= 2016 CR Vasco da Gama season =

Vasco da Gama
2016 season
- President: Eurico Miranda
- Head Coach: Jorginho
- Stadium: São Januário; Maracanã
- Brasileirão Série B: 3rd
- Copa do Brasil: Round of 16
- Rio de Janeiro State Championship: Champions; Guanabara Tournament: Champions
- Top goalscorer: League: Nenê (13); All: Nenê (21)
Home colours	Away colours

The 2016 season was Club de Regatas Vasco da Gama's 118th year in existence, the club's 101st season in existence of football, and the club's 3rd season playing in the Brasileirão Série B, the second tier of Brazilian football.

== Players ==
=== Squad information ===
As of 18 May 2016.

No.	Name	Nationality	Position (s)	Date of birth (age)	Signed from
Goalkeepers
	Gabriel Félix	(Brazil)	GK	4 April 1995 (aged 21)	Youth system
	Jordi	(Brazil)	GK	3 September 1993 (aged 23)	Youth system
	Martín Silva	(Uruguay)	GK	25 March 1983 (aged 33)	(Paraguay) Olimpia
Defenders
	Aislan	(Brazil)	CB	11 January 1988 (aged 28)	(Brazil) Madureira
	Alan (youth player)	(Brazil)	LFB	5 January 1998 (aged 18)	Youth system
	Henrique	(Brazil)	LFB	25 April 1994 (aged 22)	Youth system
	Jomar	(Brazil)	CB	28 September 1992 (aged 24)	(Brazil) Rio Branco (SP) (loaned from Vasco da Gama)
	Júlio César	(Brazil)	LFB, LWM	15 June 1982 (aged 34)	Free agent (previously on Botafogo)
	Kadu	(Brazil)	CB	2 March 1995 (aged 21)	Youth system
	Luan	(Brazil)	CB	10 May 1993 (aged 23)	Youth system
	Mádson	(Brazil)	RFB	13 January 1992 (aged 24)	(Brazil) ABC (loaned from Bahia)
	Rafael Marques	(Brazil)	CB	21 September 1983 (aged 33)	(Brazil) Coritiba
	Rodrigo	(Brazil)	CB	27 August 1980 (aged 36)	(Brazil) Goiás
	Yago Pikachu	(Brazil)	RFB, RSM, RWM, LSM, LWM	5 June 1992 (aged 24)	(Brazil) Paysandu
Midfielders
	Andrey (youth player)	(Brazil)	DM, RSM, RFB	15 February 1998 (aged 18)	Youth system
	Andrezinho	(Brazil)	LSM, AM, RSM, DM	30 July 1983 (aged 33)	(China) Tianjin Teda
	Bruno Gallo	(Brazil)	LSM, DM	7 May 1988 (aged 28)	(Portugal) Marítimo
	Diguinho	(Brazil)	DM, RSM, LSM	20 March 1983 (aged 33)	Free agent (previously on Fluminense)
	Julio dos Santos	(Paraguay)	RSM, DM, RWM, AM	7 May 1983 (aged 33)	(Paraguay) Cerro Porteño
	Evander (youth player)	(Brazil)	AM, LWM, RWM, LSM	9 June 1998 (aged 18)	Youth system
	Fellype Gabriel	(Brazil)	RSM, LSM, RWM, LWM, AM	6 December 1985 (aged 31)	(Brazil) Palmeiras
	Guilherme	(Brazil)	AM, LWM	31 March 1994 (aged 22)	(Brazil) Boavista (loaned from Vasco da Gama)
	Marcelo Mattos	(Brazil)	DM	10 February 1984 (aged 32)	(Brazil) Vitória
	Mateus Vital (youth player)	(Brazil)	AM, RSM, LSM, RWM, LWM	12 February 1998 (aged 18)	Youth system
	William (on loan from Madureira)	(Brazil)	RSM, DM	25 February 1992 (aged 24)	(Brazil) Madureira
Forwards
	Caio Monteiro (youth player)	(Brazil)	CF, RW, LW, RWM, LWM	10 February 1997 (aged 19)	Youth system
	Éder Luís	(Brazil)	RW, RWM, LWM, LW, CF	19 April 1985 (aged 31)	(United Arab Emirates) Al-Nasr Dubai (loaned from Vasco da Gama)
	Éderson (on loan from Kashiwa Reysol)	(Brazil)	CF, LW, LWM	13 March 1989 (aged 27)	(Japan) Kashiwa Reysol
	Jorge Henrique	(Brazil)	LWM, RWM, CF, LSM. RSM, LFB, RFB, CB, DM	23 April 1982 (aged 34)	(Brazil) Internacional
	Junior Dutra	(Brazil)	RW, CF, LW, AM, RWM, LWM	25 April 1988 (aged 28)	Al-Arabi (Qatar)
	Leandrão	(Brazil)	CF	18 July 1983 (aged 33)	(Brazil) Boavista (loaned from Vasco da Gama)
	Nenê	(Brazil)	AM, LW, LWM, CF	19 July 1981 (aged 35)	(England) West Ham United
	Thalles	(Brazil)	CF	18 May 1995 (aged 21)	Youth system

==== from Vasco da Gama (B) (reserve team) ====
No.	Name	Nationality	Position (s)	Date of birth (age)	Signed from
Midfielders
	Jéferson	(Brazil)	AM, LSM	15 July 1984 (aged 32)	(Brazil) Madureira (loaned from Vasco da Gama)
	Matheus Batista	(Brazil)	DM, CB	4 October 1994 (aged 22)	Youth system
Forwards
	Emerson Carioca	(Brazil)	RW, LW	7 December 1995 (aged 21)	Youth system

==== from Vasco da Gama (U–20) (ables to play in first team) ====
No.	Name	Nationality	Position (s)	Date of birth (age)	Signed from
Goalkeepers
	Yuri (youth player)	(Brazil)	GK	22 May 1997 (aged 19)	Youth system
Defenders
	Lorran (youth player)	(Brazil)	LFB, LWM	8 January 1996 (aged 20)	Youth system
	Lucas Barboza (youth player)	(Brazil)	CB, DM	14 March 1996 (aged 20)	Youth system
	Ricardo (youth player)	(Brazil)	CB	19 February 1997 (aged 19)	Youth system
Midfielders
	Douglas Luiz (youth player)	(Brazil)	RSM, LSM, DM	9 May 1998 (aged 18)	Youth system
Forwards
	Hugo Borges (youth player)	(Brazil)	CF	1 January 1998 (aged 18)	Youth system
	Paulo Vitor (youth player)	(Brazil)	CF, RW, LW	24 June 1999 (aged 17)	Youth system

==== Out of loan ====
No.	Name	Nationality	Position (s)	Date of birth (age)	Signed from
Defenders
	Bruno Ferreira (on loan to Red Bull Brasil)	(Brazil)	RFB	14 September 1994 (aged 22)	(Brazil) Vasco da Gama
	Erick (on loan to São Martinho)	(Brazil)	LFB	17 January 1993 (aged 23)	(Portugal) Lixa (loaned from Vasco da Gama)
	Márcio (on loan to Central (Caruaru))	(Brazil)	LFB, LSM	3 August 1995 (aged 21)	(Brazil) Baraúnas (loaned from Vasco da Gama)
Midfielders
	Bruno Cosendey (on loan to Vitória (Guimarães))	(Brazil)	LSM, RSM, DM	25 January 1997 (aged 19)	(Brazil) Vasco da Gama – (U–20) (youth player)
	Calebe (on loan to Flamengo (PI))	(Brazil)	DM, CB	19 July 1995 (aged 21)	(Brazil) São Cristóvão (loaned from Vasco da Gama – (U–20) (youth player))
	Índio (on loan to Estoril Praia)	(Brazil)	AM, RSM, RWM, LSM	28 February 1996 (aged 20)	(Brazil) Vasco da Gama
	Sandro Silva (on loan to Oeste)	(Brazil)	RSM, LSM, DM	29 April 1984 (aged 32)	(Brazil) Vasco da Gama – (B)
	Santiago Montoya (on loan to Deportes Tolima)	(Colombia)	LWM, AM, RW	15 September 1991 (aged 25)	(Portugal) Vitória (Guimarães) (loaned from Vasco da Gama)
	Victor Bolt (on loan to Vila Nova)	(Brazil)	LSM, RSM, DM	14 April 1987 (aged 29)	(Brazil) Portuguesa (loaned from Vasco da Gama)
Forwards
	Erick Luis (on loan to Joinville)	(Brazil)	CF, RW, LW	16 July 1992 (aged 24)	(Brazil) Grêmio Osasco Audax (loaned from Vasco da Gama)
	Renato Kayser (on loan to Portuguesa)	(Brazil)	CF, RW, LW	17 February 1996 (aged 20)	(Brazil) Oeste (loaned from Vasco da Gama)
	William Barbio (on loan to Joinville)	(Brazil)	RW, RWM, LW, LWM	16 July 1992 (aged 24)	(Brazil) América (MG) (loaned from Vasco da Gama)
	Yago (on loan to Tupi)	(Brazil)	LW, RW, LWM, RWM	28 April 1994 (aged 22)	(Brazil) Macaé (loaned from Vasco da Gama)

==== Vasco da Gama – (U–20) ====
As of 29 December 2015.

No.	Name	Nationality	Position (s)	Date of birth (age)	Signed from
Goalkeepers
	João Pedro	(Brazil)	GK	28 January 1998 (age 27)	Youth system
	Junior Souza	(Brazil)	GK	6 March 1996 (age 29)	Youth system
	Matheus Cabral	(Brazil)	GK	15 February 1998 (age 27)	Youth system
	Yuri Duarte	(Brazil)	GK	22 May 1997 (age 28)	Youth system
Defenders
	Arthur	(Brazil)	CB	7 January 1998 (age 28)	Youth system
	Daniel Gonçalves	(Brazil)	CB	4 March 1996 (age 29)	Youth system
	Gabriel Buriche	(Brazil)	RB	12 March 1998 (age 27)	Youth system
	Lucas Barboza	(Brazil)	CB	14 March 1996 (age 29)	Youth system
	Matheus Peixe	(Brazil)	RB	28 June 1997 (age 28)	Youth system
	Lorran	(Brazil)	LB	8 January 1996 (age 30)	Youth system
	Manoel	(Brazil)	LB	8 June 1996 (age 29)	Youth system
	Paulo Vitor	(Brazil)	RB	2 January 1997 (age 29)	Youth system
	Raniel	(Brazil)	CB	16 January 1997 (age 29)	Youth system
	Richard	(Brazil)	CB	26 May 1998 (age 27)	Youth system
Midfielders
	Douglas Luiz	(Brazil)	DMF	12 March 1998 (age 27)	Youth system
	Dudu Feitoza	(Brazil)	AMF	14 December 1998 (age 27)	Youth system
	Edu Melo	(Brazil)	AMF	1 May 1996 (age 29)	(Brazil) Portuguesa – (U-20) (youth system)
	Iago Índio	(Brazil)	DMF	30 April 1996 (age 29)	Youth system
	João Victor	(Brazil)	DMF	5 March 1997 (age 28)	Youth system
	Jussa	(Brazil)	DMF	22 March 1996 (age 29)	(Brazil) Portuguesa
	Rafael França	(Brazil)	DMF	17 March 1998 (age 27)	Youth system
	Rodrigo Fernandes	(Brazil)	DMF	3 May 1998 (age 27)	Youth system
Forwards
	Gabriel	(Brazil)	ST	26 April 1996 (age 29)	Youth system
	Gerônimo	(Brazil)	ST	28 January 1997 (age 28)	Youth system
	Hugo Borges	(Brazil)	ST	1 January 1998 (age 28)	Youth system
	Lucas Santos	(Brazil)	ST	7 March 1999 (age 26)	Youth system

=== Transfers ===
==== In ====
Date	Player	Number	Position	Previous club	Fee/notes	Ref
16 December 2015	(Brazil) Yago Pikachu		DF	(Brazil) Paysandu		Vasco.com.br
6 January 2016	(Brazil) Marcelo Mattos		MF	(Brazil) Vitória		
8 April 2016	(Brazil) Daniel		DF	Free agent (last club: (Germany) Anker Wismar)		
20 May 2016	(Brazil) Fellype Gabriel		MF	(Brazil) Palmeiras		Vasco.com.br
4 July 2016	(Brazil) Rafael Marques		DF	(Brazil) Coritiba		
19 July 2016	(Brazil) Junior Dutra		FW	Al-Arabi (Qatar)		Vasco.com.br

===== Loan in =====
Date from	Date to	Player	Number	Position	Previous club	Fee/notes	Ref
25 May 2015	17 May 2016	(Colombia) Duvier Riascos		FW	(Brazil) Cruzeiro	Loan transfer from Cruzeiro; Previously end of loan: 30 June 2016	
17 May 2016	31 December 2016	(Brazil) William		MF	(Brazil) Madureira	Loan transfer from Madureira	Vasco.com.br
19 July 2016	30 June 2017	(Brazil) Éderson		FW	(Japan) Kashiwa Reysol	Loan transfer from Kashiwa Reysol	Vasco.com.br

===== On trial (in) =====
Date from	Date to	Player	Number	Position	Previous club	Fee/notes	Ref
8 April 2016	8 July 2016	(Brazil) Daniel		DF	Free agent (last club: (Germany) Anker Wismar)	Vasco da Gama – (B)	

==== Out ====
Date	Player	Number	Position	Destination club	Fee/notes	Ref
11 December 2015, 31 December 2015; 21 December 2015	(Brazil) Alessandro		GK	(Brazil) Aimoré	Previously on Vasco da Gama – (B)	
11 December 2015, 31 December 2015; 29 January 2016	(Brazil) Charles		GK	(Portugal) Marítimo		
11 December 2015, 31 December 2015; 28 December 2015	(Brazil) Rafael Copetti		GK	(Brazil) ABC	Previously on Bragantino on loan from Vasco da Gama	
11 December 2015, 31 December 2015; 22 January 2016	(Brazil) Anderson Salles		DF	(Brazil) Goiás		
11 December 2015, 31 December 2015; 7 January 2016	(Brazil) Bruno Teles		DF	(Brazil) Mogi Mirim		
11 December 2015, 31 December 2015; 14 January 2016	(Brazil) João Carlos		DF	(Belgium) Lokeren Oost-Vlaanderen		
11 December 2015, 31 December 2015; 16 January 2016	(Brazil) Marlon		DF	(Brazil) Capivariano	Previously on Bahia on loan from Vasco da Gama	
11 December 2015, 31 December 2015	(Paraguay) Eduardo Aranda		MF	(Japan) JEF United	Previously on Olimpia on loan from Vasco da Gama	
11 December 2015, 31 December 2015; 30 December 2015	(Brazil) Bernardo		MF	(South Korea) Ulsan Hyundai	Previously on Ceará on loan from Vasco da Gama	
11 December 2015, 31 December 2015; 6 January 2016	(Argentina) Emanuel Biancucchi		MF	(Brazil) Ceará		
11 December 2015, 31 December 2015; 26 January 2016	(Brazil) Paulista		MF	(Brazil) Boavista	Previously on Boa on loan from Vasco da Gama	
11 December 2015, 31 December 2015; 31 December 2015	(Brazil) Rafael Silva		FW	(Brazil) Cruzeiro		
26 November 2015; 11 December 2015, 31 December 2015	(Brazil) Romarinho		FW	(Japan) Zweigen Kanazawa		
30 December 2015, 28 January 2016; 28 January 2016	(Brazil) Nei		DF	(Brazil) Paraná Clube		
5 January 2016; 14 January 2016	(Argentina) Germán Herrera		FW	(Argentina) Rosario Central		
22 January 2016	(Argentina) Pablo Guiñazú		MF	(Argentina) Talleres (Córdoba)		
25 May 2016, 31 May 2016; 6 June 2016	(Brazil) Diogo Silva		GK	(Brazil) Luverdense		
23 May 2016, 31 May 2016	(Brazil) Rafael Vaz		DF	(Brazil) Flamengo		
14 June 2016, 30 June 2016	(Brazil) Max		DF		Previously on ABC on loan from Vasco da Gama	
8 July 2016	(Brazil) Daniel		DF		Previously on Vasco da Gama – (B)	
1 September 2016	(Brazil) Nikolas Mariano		DF	(Portugal) Oliveirense	Previously on Oliveirense on loan from Vasco da Gama	

===== Loan out =====
Date from	Date to	Player	Number	Position	Destination club	Fee/notes	Ref
11 June 2015	22 April 2016	(Colombia) Santiago Montoya		MF	(Portugal) Vitória (Guimarães)	Previously end of loan: 30 June 2016	
2 September 2015	31 August 2016	(Brazil) Nikolas Mariano		DF	(Portugal) Oliveirense	Previously end of loan: 30 June 2016	
2 September 2015	30 June 2016	(Brazil) Ricardo		DF	(Portugal) Vitória (Guimarães)		
4 November 2015	31 December 2016	(Brazil) Victor Bolt		MF	(Brazil) Vila Nova		
19 November 2015	31 December 2016	(Brazil) Calebe		MF	(Brazil) Flamengo (PI)		
28 December 2015	29 March 2016	(Brazil) Emerson Carioca		FW	(Brazil) Friburguense	Previously end of loan: 30 June 2016	
30 December 2015	30 April 2016	(Brazil) Guilherme		MF	(Brazil) Boavista	Previously end of loan: 30 June 2016	
8 January 2016	30 June 2016	(Brazil) Max		DF	(Brazil) ABC		
11 January 2016	30 April 2016	(Brazil) Yago		FW	(Brazil) Macaé	Previously end of loan: 30 June 2016	
11 January 2016	30 April 2016	(Brazil) Leandrão		FW	(Brazil) Boavista	Previously end of loan: 30 June 2016	
18 January 2016	30 April 2016	(Brazil) Jéferson		MF	(Brazil) Madureira	Previously end of loan: 30 June 2016	
20 January 2016	30 June 2016	(Brazil) Erick		DF	(Portugal) Lixa		
22 January 2016	30 April 2016	(Brazil) Erick Luis		FW	(Brazil) Grêmio Osasco Audax	Previously end of loan: 30 June 2016	
26 January 2016	31 December 2016	(Brazil) Sandro Silva		MF	(Brazil) Oeste		
27 January 2016	30 June 2017	(Brazil) Bruno Cosendey		MF	(Portugal) Vitória (Guimarães)		
18 February 2016	31 May 2016	(Brazil) Márcio		DF	(Brazil) Baraúnas	Previously end of loan: 30 June 2016	
26 February 2016	23 May 2016	(Brazil) Renato Kayser		FW	(Brazil) Oeste	Previously end of loan: 31 December 2016	
9 May 2016	15 June 2016	(Brazil) William Barbio		FW	(Brazil) América (MG)	Previously end of loan: 31 December 2016	
24 May 2016	31 December 2016	(Brazil) Erick Luis		FW	(Brazil) Joinville		
24 May 2016	31 December 2016	(Brazil) Renato Kayser		FW	(Brazil) Portuguesa		
16 June 2016	31 December 2016	(Brazil) William Barbio		FW	(Brazil) Joinville		
28 June 2016	30 June 2017	(Brazil) Bruno Ferreira		DF	(Brazil) Red Bull Brasil		
29 June 2016	30 June 2017	(Brazil) Índio		MF	(Portugal) Estoril Praia		
12 July 2016	30 June 2017	(Colombia) Santiago Montoya		MF	(Colombia) Deportes Tolima		
16 July 2016	31 December 2016	(Brazil) Márcio		DF	(Brazil) Central (Caruaru)		
19 July 2016	31 December 2016	(Brazil) Erick		DF	(Portugal) São Martinho		
14 September 2016	31 December 2016	(Brazil) Yago		FW	(Brazil) Tupi		

== Match results ==
=== Rio de Janeiro State Championship ===
==== Rio de Janeiro State Championship squad ====
The initial report was released on 26 January. The teams involved in the tournament are required to register a squad of a maximum 31 players in total, including 3 goalkeepers and at maximum 5 players under 20 years old (born 1 January 1996 or after).

Note: Flags indicate national team as defined under FIFA eligibility rules; some limited exceptions apply. Players may hold more than one non-FIFA nationality.

No.	Pos.	Nation	Player
––	DF	BRA	Mádson
––	DF	BRA	Yago Pikachu
––	DF	BRA	Bruno Ferreira
––	DF	BRA	Rodrigo
––	DF	BRA	Luan
––	DF	BRA	Rafael Vaz
––	DF	BRA	Jomar
––	DF	BRA	Júlio César
––	DF	BRA	Henrique
––	MF	BRA	Diguinho
––	MF	BRA	Bruno Gallo
––	MF	BRA	Marcelo Mattos
––	MF	PAR	Julio dos Santos
––	MF	BRA	Andrezinho
––	FW	BRA	Nenê

No.	Pos.	Nation	Player
––	FW	BRA	Jorge Henrique
––	FW	COL	Duvier Riascos
––	FW	BRA	Thalles
––	FW	BRA	Éder Luís
––	FW	BRA	William Barbio
––	FW	BRA	Caio Monteiro (U–20 player)
––	MF	BRA	Andrey (U–20 player)
––	MF	BRA	Mateus Vital (U–20 player)
––	MF	BRA	Índio (U–20 player)
––	MF	BRA	Evander (U–20 player)
––	GK	URU	Martín Silva
––	GK	BRA	Diogo Silva
––	GK	BRA	Jordi
––	DF	BRA	Aislan

==== Early stage ====
Pos	Team	Pld	W	D	L	GF	GA	GD	Pts	Qualification
1	Vasco da Gama	8	6	2	0	18	6	+12	20	Taça Guanabara
2	Boavista	8	4	3	1	13	7	+6	15	Taça Guanabara
3	Fluminense	8	4	1	3	16	11	+5	13	Taça Guanabara
4	Bangu	8	3	2	3	13	11	+2	11	Taça Guanabara
5	Cabofriense	8	2	1	5	9	12	−3	7	Taça Rio

Updated to match(es) played on 3 March 2016. Source:
Rules for classification: 1) points; 2) goal difference; 3) number of goals scored.

31 January 2016 I	Vasco da Gama	4 – 1	Madureira	Rio de Janeiro
17:00 BDT	Riascos 8' 90+3' (yellow card) 86'; Andrezinho 49'; Nenê 81' (pen.)	Report	16' (yellow card) 45+2' Daniel; (yellow card) 45+2' Éverton; (yellow card) 63' Jorge Fellipe; (yellow card) 82' Érnani	Stadium: Estádio Vasco da Gama (São Januário); Attendance: 8,892; Referee: Grazianni Maciel Rocha

4 February 2016 II	America	1 – 3	Vasco da Gama	Mesquita, Rio de Janeiro
19:30 BDT	Leandro Aguiar 79'; Darlan (yellow card) 45+1'; Erick (yellow card) 45+1'; Fábio Braz (yellow card) 83'	Report	16' (pen.) (yellow card) 82' Nenê; 66' (yellow card) 67' Riascos; 85' (yellow card) 88' Rodrigo; (yellow card) 87' Yago Pikachu	Stadium: Estádio Giulite Coutinho (Édson Passos); Attendance: 6,052; Referee: Wagner do Nascimento Magalhães

10 February 2016 III	Vasco da Gama	2 – 0	Volta Redonda	Rio de Janeiro
17:00 BDT	Nenê 61' (pen.) (yellow card) 45+1'; Thalles 90+4'; Luan (yellow card) 37' (yellow-red card) 90'; Jorge Henrique (yellow card) 44'; Rodrigo (yellow card) 78'; Silva (yellow card) 90+2'	Report	(yellow card) 16' Bruno Barra	Stadium: Estádio Vasco da Gama (São Januário); Attendance: Bruno Arleu de Araújo; Referee: 5,534

14 February 2016 IV	Vasco da Gama	1 – 0	Flamengo	Rio de Janeiro
17:00 BDT	Rafael Vaz 90+1' (yellow card) 90+2'; Marcelo Mattos (yellow card) 29'; Rodrigo (yellow card) 56' dos Santos (yellow card) 76'	Report	(yellow card) 28' Guerrero; (yellow card) 67' Wallace	Stadium: Estádio Vasco da Gama (São Januário); Attendance: 14,364; Referee: Leonardo Garcia Cavaleiro

20 February 2016 V	Tigres do Brasil	0 – 2	Vasco da Gama	Duque de Caxias, Rio de Janeiro
19:30 BDT		Report	79' Thalles; 83' Nenê	Stadium: Estádio de Los Larios; Attendance: 2,286; Referee: Rodrigo Carvalhaes de Miranda

25 February 2016 Match 6	Vasco da Gama	2 – 2	Friburguense	Rio de Janeiro
17:00 BST	Riascos 45' 78'	Summary	Romulo 26' 83' (pen.); Pierre (yellow card) 90'	Stadium: Estádio Vasco da Gama (São Januário); Attendance: 2,180; Referee: (Brazil) Leandro Newley Ferreira Belota

28 February 2016 Match 7	Vasco da Gama	1 – 1	Botafogo	Rio de Janeiro
19:00 BST	Rodrigo (yellow card) 38'; Marcelo Mattos (yellow card) 38'; Andrezinho (yellow card) 45'; Riascos 61'; Bruno Gallo (yellow card) 85'	Summary	Bruno Silva (yellow card) 21'; Luis Ricardo (yellow card) 37'; Airton (yellow card) 73'; Emerson 88'	Stadium: Estádio Vasco da Gama (São Januário); Attendance: 8,869; Referee: (Brazil) Mauricio Machado Coelho Junior

5 March 2016 Match 8	Bonsucesso	1 – 3	Vasco da Gama	Duque de Caxias, Rio de Janeiro
17:30 BST	Matheus Pimenta 46'; Rosales (yellow card) 83'	Summary	Thalles 3' 81'; Nenê 29'	Stadium: Estádio de Los Larios; Attendance: 1,461; Referee: (Brazil) Diego da Silva Lourenço

==== Guanabara Tournament ====
===== Guanabara Tournament matches =====
13 March 2016 I	Vasco da Gama	v	Bangu	Rio de Janeiro
16:00 BST		[ Report]		Stadium: Estádio Vasco da Gama (São Januário)

19 March 2016 II	Boavista	v	Vasco da Gama	Cariacica, Espírito Santo
16:00 BST		[ Report]		Stadium: Estádio Estadual Kléber José de Andrade

27 March 2016 III	Vasco da Gama	v	Botafogo	Rio de Janeiro
16:00 BST		[ Report]		Stadium: Estádio Vasco da Gama (São Januário)

30 March 2016 IV	Flamengo	v	Vasco da Gama	Brasília
22:00 BST		[ Report]		Stadium: Estádio Nacional de Brasília (Mané Garrincha)

3 April 2016 V	Vasco da Gama	v	Volta Redonda	Rio de Janeiro
16:00 BST		[ Report]		Stadium: Estádio Vasco da Gama (São Januário)

9 April 2016 VI	Vasco da Gama	v	Madureira	Rio de Janeiro
18:30 BST		[ Report]		Stadium: Estádio Vasco da Gama (São Januário)

17 April 2016 VII	Fluminense	v	Vasco da Gama	Manaus
15:00 BST –1		[ Report]		Stadium: Arena da Amazônia

==== Final stage ====
===== Final stage matches =====
24 April 2016 Semifinal	Vasco da Gama	v	Flamengo	Manaus
15:00 BST –1		[ Report] [ Report]		Stadium: Arena da Amazônia

1 May 2016 Finals: leg I	Botafogo	v	Vasco da Gama	Rio de Janeiro
16:00 BST		[ Report] [ Report]		Stadium: Estádio Mário Filho (Maracanã)

8 May 2016 Finals: leg II	Vasco da Gama	v	Botafogo	Rio de Janeiro
16:00 BST		[ Report] [ Report]		Stadium: Estádio Mário Filho (Maracanã)

=== Copa do Brasil ===
==== Copa do Brasil matches ====
13 April 2016 First stage: leg I	Remo	v	Vasco da Gama	Belém
22:00 BST		[ Report]		Stadium: Estádio Olímpico do Pará (Mangueirão)

27 April 2016 First stage: leg II	Vasco da Gama	v	Remo	Rio de Janeiro
22:00 BST		[ Report]		Stadium: Estádio Vasco da Gama (São Januário)

11 May 2016 Second stage: leg I	CRB	v	Vasco da Gama	Maceió
22:00 BST		[ Report]		Stadium: Estádio Rei Pelé (Trapichão)

18 May 2016 Second stage: leg II	Vasco da Gama	v	CRB	Rio de Janeiro
19:30 BST		[ Report]		Stadium: Estádio Vasco da Gama (São Januário)

13 July 2016 Third stage: leg I	Vasco da Gama	v	Santa Cruz	Rio de Janeiro
21:45 BST		[ Report]		Stadium: Estádio Vasco da Gama (São Januário)

20 July 2016 Third stage: leg II	Santa Cruz	v	Vasco da Gama	Recife
21:45 BST		[ Report]		Stadium: Estádio José do Rego Maciel (Arruda)

24 August 2016 Round of 16: leg I	Santos	v	Vasco da Gama	Santos, São Paulo
19:30 BST		[ Report]		Stadium: Estádio Urbano Caldeira (Vila Belmiro)

21 September 2016 Round of 16: leg II	Vasco da Gama	v	Santos	Rio de Janeiro
21:45 BST		[ Report]		Stadium: Estádio Vasco da Gama (São Januário)

== Statistics ==
=== Appearances and goals ===
Last updated on 26 November 2016.

No.	Pos	Nat	Player	Total		Brasileirão Série B		Copa do Brasil		Rio de Janeiro State Championship		Other	
No.	Pos	Nat	Player	Apps	Goals	Apps	Goals	Apps	Goals	Apps	Goals	Apps	Goals
Goalkeepers
	GK	(Brazil) BRA	Gabriel Félix	0	0	0	0	0	0	0	0	0	0
	GK	(Brazil) BRA	Jordi	14	0	12	0	1	0	1	0	0	0
	GK	(Uruguay) URU	Martín Silva	50	0	26	0	7	0	17	0	0	0
Defenders
	DF	(Brazil) BRA	Aislan	5	0	2+3	0	0	0	0	0	0	0
	DF	(Brazil) BRA	Alan	10	0	3+6	0	0+1	0	0	0	0	0
	DF	(Brazil) BRA	Henrique	17	0	4+7	0	3	0	3	0	0	0
	DF	(Brazil) BRA	Jomar	14	0	7+2	0	2	0	2+1	0	0	0
	DF	(Brazil) BRA	Júlio César	53	0	32	0	6	0	15	0	0	0
	DF	(Brazil) BRA	Kadu	0	0	0	0	0	0	0	0	0	0
	DF	(Brazil) BRA	Luan	44	6	28	5	0	0	16	1	0	0
	DF	(Brazil) BRA	Mádson	53	1	25+4	1	5+1	0	18	0	0	0
	DF	(Brazil) BRA	Rafael Marques	10	0	7+3	0	0	0	0	0	0	0
	DF	(Brazil) BRA	Rodrigo	55	5	32	3	6	1	17	1	0	0
	DF	(Brazil) BRA	Yago Pikachu	46	4	19+8	3	5+3	1	0+11	0	0	0
Midfielders
	MF	(Brazil) BRA	Andrey	2	0	0+1	0	0+1	0	0	0	0	0
	MF	(Brazil) BRA	Andrezinho	55	7	31+1	4	7	1	16	2	0	0
	MF	(Brazil) BRA	Bruno Gallo	12	0	3+3	0	0	0	2+4	0	0	0
	MF	(Brazil) BRA	Diguinho	32	0	16+5	0	3+1	0	1+6	0	0	0
	MF	(Paraguay) PAR	Julio dos Santos	34	0	11+4	0	1+1	0	17	0	0	0
	MF	(Brazil) BRA	Evander	16	0	3+7	0	2+3	0	0+1	0	0	0
	MF	(Brazil) BRA	Fellype Gabriel	4	0	2+2	0	0	0	0	0	0	0
	MF	(Brazil) BRA	Guilherme	0	0	0	0	0	0	0	0	0	0
	MF	(Brazil) BRA	Índio	3	0	0	0	0	0	1+2	0	0	0
	MF	(Brazil) BRA	Marcelo Mattos	35	2	15+1	1	6	0	13	1	0	0
	MF	(Brazil) BRA	Mateus Vital	5	0	0+1	0	0	0	3+1	0	0	0
	MF	(Brazil) BRA	William	20	0	12+6	0	1+1	0	0	0	0	0
Forwards
	FW	(Brazil) BRA	Caio Monteiro	17	2	2+7	1	0+2	1	1+5	0	0	0
	FW	(Brazil) BRA	Éder Luís	38	2	5+16	1	1+4	1	3+9	0	0	0
	FW	(Brazil) BRA	Éderson	23	8	19+2	7	2	1	0	0	0	0
	FW	(Brazil) BRA	Jorge Henrique	49	3	24+4	0	6	1	15	2	0	0
	FW	(Brazil) BRA	Junior Dutra	13	1	6+6	1	1	0	0	0	0	0
	FW	(Brazil) BRA	Leandrão	12	3	8+3	3	1	0	0	0	0	0
	FW	(Brazil) BRA	Nenê	55	21	31	13	7	1	17	7	0	0
	FW	(Brazil) BRA	Thalles	47	13	18+10	7	2+5	1	7+5	5	0	0
Players of youth squads who have made an appearance or had a squad number this season
	GK	(Brazil) BRA	Yuri	0	0	0	0	0	0	0	0	0	0
	DF	(Brazil) BRA	Lucas Barboza	0	0	0	0	0	0	0	0	0	0
	MF	(Brazil) BRA	Douglas Luiz	15	2	13+1	2	1	0	0	0	0	0
	FW	(Brazil) BRA	Hugo Borges	0	0	0	0	0	0	0	0	0	0
Players who have made an appearance or had a squad number this season but have transferred or loaned out during the season
	FW	(Brazil) BRA	Renato Kayser	0	0	0	0	0	0	0	0	0	0
	FW	(Brazil) BRA	William Barbio	1	0	0	0	0	0	0+1	0	0	0
	FW	(Colombia) COL	Duvier Riascos	17	10	1	1	3	0	12+1	9	0	0
	DF	(Brazil) BRA	Rafael Vaz	11	4	0+1	0	2+1	2	1+6	2	0	0
	GK	(Brazil) BRA	Diogo Silva	0	0	0	0	0	0	0	0	0	0
	DF	(Brazil) BRA	Bruno Ferreira	2	0	1	0	1	0	0	0	0	0

== See also ==
- 2016 Rio de Janeiro State Championship
- 2016 Copa do Brasil
- 2016 Brasileirão Série B
