= 2017 CR Vasco da Gama season =

Vasco da Gama
2017 season
- President: Eurico Miranda
- Head Coach: Zé Ricardo since 23 August (Milton Mendes since 19 March until 21 August) (Cristóvão until 17 March)
- Stadium: São Januário; Maracanã
- Brasileirão Série A: 7th
- Copa do Brasil: Third round
- Campeonato Carioca: Semi-finals
- Top goalscorer: League: Luís Fabiano (5); Nenê (5); All: Nenê (11)
Home colours	Away colours	Third colours

The 2017 season was Club de Regatas Vasco da Gama's 119th complete calendar year in existence, the club's 102nd season in existence of football, and the club's 44th season playing in the Brasileirão Série A, the top flight of Brazilian football.

== Players ==
=== Squad information ===
As of 22 July 2017.

No.	Name	Nationality	Position (s)	Date of birth (age)	Signed From
Goalkeepers
	Gabriel Félix	(Brazil)	GK	4 April 1995 (aged 22)	Youth system
	João Pedro (youth player)	(Brazil)	GK	28 January 1998 (aged 19)	Youth system
	Jordi	(Brazil)	GK	3 September 1993 (aged 24)	Youth system
	Martín Silva	(Uruguay)	GK	25 March 1983 (aged 34)	(Paraguay) Olimpia
Defenders
	Alan (youth player)	(Brazil)	LFB, LWM	5 January 1998 (aged 19)	Youth system
	Anderson Martins	(Brazil)	CB	21 August 1987 (aged 30)	(Qatar) Umm Salal (loaned from El Jaish)
	Breno (on loan from São Paulo)	(Brazil)	CB, DM	13 October 1989 (aged 28)	(Brazil) São Paulo
	Gilberto (on loan from Fiorentina)	(Brazil)	RFB, DM, LFB	7 March 1993 (aged 24)	(Italy) Latina (loaned from Fiorentina)
	Henrique	(Brazil)	LFB	25 April 1994 (aged 23)	Youth system
	Jomar	(Brazil)	CB	28 September 1992 (aged 25)	(Brazil) Rio Branco (SP) (loaned from Vasco da Gama)
	Lucas Rocha (on loan from Boavista)	(Brazil)	CB	19 June 1995 (aged 22)	(Brazil) Boavista
	Mádson	(Brazil)	RFB	13 January 1992 (aged 25)	(Brazil) ABC (loaned from Bahia)
	Paulão (on loan from Internacional)	(Brazil)	CB	25 February 1986 (aged 31)	(Brazil) Internacional
	Rafael Marques	(Brazil)	CB	21 September 1983 (aged 34)	(Brazil) Coritiba
	Ramon	(Brazil)	LFB	6 May 1988 (aged 29)	(Turkey) Antalyaspor
	Ricardo (youth player)	(Brazil)	CB	19 February 1997 (aged 20)	Youth system
	Yago Pikachu	(Brazil)	RFB, RWM	5 June 1992 (aged 25)	(Brazil) Paysandu
Midfielders
	Andrey (youth player)	(Brazil)	DM, RFB	15 February 1998 (aged 19)	Youth system
	Bruno Cosendey (youth player)	(Brazil)	DM, AM	25 January 1997 (aged 20)	Youth system
	Bruno Paulista (on loan from Sporting de Portugal)	(Brazil)	DM	21 August 1995 (aged 22)	Sporting de Portugal
	Damián Escudero	(Argentina)	LWM, AM, DM, RWM, LFB	20 April 1987 (aged 30)	(Mexico) Puebla
	Evander (youth player)	(Brazil)	AM, DM, LWM, RWM	9 June 1998 (aged 19)	Youth system
	Guilherme	(Brazil)	LWM, AM, RWM	31 March 1994 (aged 23)	(Brazil) Boavista (loaned from Vasco da Gama)
	Jean (on loan from Corinthians)	(Brazil)	DM	23 September 1994 (aged 23)	(Brazil) Corinthians
	Marcelo Mattos	(Brazil)	DM	10 February 1984 (aged 33)	(Brazil) Vitória
	Mateus Vital (youth player)	(Brazil)	AM, LWM, RWM	12 February 1998 (aged 19)	Youth system
	Wágner	(Brazil)	AM, LWM, RWM, DM	29 January 1985 (aged 32)	(China) Tianjin TEDA
	Wellington (on loan from São Paulo)	(Brazil)	DM	28 January 1991 (aged 26)	(Brazil) São Paulo
Forwards
	Caio Monteiro (youth player)	(Brazil)	LWM, CF, RWM	10 February 1997 (aged 20)	Youth system
	Éder Luís	(Brazil)	RWM, LWM	19 April 1985 (aged 32)	(United Arab Emirates) Al-Nasr Dubai (loaned from Vasco da Gama)
	Andrés Ramiro Escobar (on loan from Dynamo Kyjiv)	(Colombia)	LWM, RWM	14 May 1991 (aged 26)	(Colombia) Millonarios (on loan from Dynamo Kyjiv)
	Kelvin (on loan from Porto)	(Brazil)	RWM, LWM	1 June 1993 (aged 24)	(Brazil) São Paulo (on loan from Porto)
	Luís Fabiano	(Brazil)	CF	8 November 1980 (aged 37)	(China) Tianjin Quanjian
	Nenê	(Brazil)	LWM, AM, CF	19 July 1981 (aged 36)	(England) West Ham United
	Paulinho (youth player)	(Brazil)	RWM, LWM, CF, AM	15 July 2000 (aged 17)	Youth system
	Paulo Vitor (youth player)	(Brazil)	CF, RWM, LWM	24 June 1999 (aged 18)	Youth system
	Andrés Ríos	(Argentina)	CF	1 August 1989 (aged 28)	(Argentina) Defensa y Justicia
	Thalles	(Brazil)	CF	18 May 1995 (aged 22)	Youth system

==== from Vasco da Gama (B) (reserve team) ====
Note: Flags indicate national team as defined under FIFA eligibility rules; some limited exceptions apply. Players may hold more than one non-FIFA nationality.

No. / Pos. / Nation / Player; — / DF / BRA / Bruno Ferreira	No. / Pos. / Nation / Player; — / MF / BRA / Jussa

==== Out on loan ====
Note: Flags indicate national team as defined under FIFA eligibility rules; some limited exceptions apply. Players may hold more than one non-FIFA nationality.

No.	Pos.	Nation	Player
—	DF	BRA	Júlio César (on loan from Boavista)
—	DF	BRA	Kadu (on loan from Boavista)
—	DF	BRA	Lorran (on loan to Moto Club de São Luís)
—	MF	BRA	Andrezinho (on loan to Goiás)

No.	Pos.	Nation	Player
—	MF	COL	Santiago Montoya (on loan to Deportes Tolima)
—	FW	BRA	Renato Kayser (on loan to Ferroviária)
—	FW	BRA	William Barbio (on loan to Santa Cruz)

=== Transfers ===
==== In ====
Date	Player	Number	Position	Previous club	Fee/notes	Ref
25 December 2016	(Argentina) Damián Escudero		MF	(Mexico) Puebla		Vasco.com.br
5 January 2017	(Brazil) Muriqui		FW	(Japan) FC Tokyo (loaned from Al Sadd)		Vasco.com.br
17 January 2017	(Brazil) Wágner		MF	(China) Tianjin TEDA		Vasco.com.br
17 February 2017	(Brazil) Luís Fabiano		FW	(China) Tianjin Quanjian		Vasco.com.br
29 June 2017	(Brazil) Ramon		DF	(Turkey) Antalyaspor		Vasco.com.br
10 July 2017	(Argentina) Andrés Ríos		FW	(Argentina) Defensa y Justicia		Vasco.com.br
20 July 2017	(Brazil) Anderson Martins		DF	(Qatar) Umm Salal (loaned from El Jaish)		Vasco.com.br

===== Loan in =====
Date from	Date to	Player	Number	Position	Previous club	Fee/notes	Ref
19 July 2016	24 May 2017	(Brazil) Éderson		FW	(Japan) Kashiwa Reysol	Loan transfer from Kashiwa Reysol; Previously end of loan: 30 June 2017	Vasco.com.br
2 February 2017	19 December 2017	(Brazil) Gilberto		DF	(Italy) Latina (loaned from Fiorentina)	Loan transfer from Fiorentina; Previously end of loan: 31 December 2017	Vasco.com.br
2 February 2017	2 January 2018	(Brazil) Jean		MF	(Brazil) Corinthians	Loan transfer from Corinthians; Previously end of loan: 31 December 2017	Vasco.com.br
3 February 2017	31 December 2017	(Brazil) Kelvin		FW	(Brazil) São Paulo (loaned from Porto)	Loan transfer from Porto	Vasco.com.br
9 February 2017	4 December 2017	(Colombia) Andrés Ramiro Escobar		FW	(Colombia) Millonarios (loaned from Dynamo Kyjiv)	Loan transfer from Dynamo Kyjiv; Previously end of loan: 31 December 2017	Vasco.com.br
16 May 2017	2 January 2018	(Brazil) Paulão		DF	(Brazil) Internacional	Loan transfer from Internacional; Previously end of loan: 31 December 2017	Vasco.com.br
17 May 2017	27 December 2017	(Brazil) Breno		DF	(Brazil) São Paulo	Loan transfer from São Paulo; Previously end of loan: 31 December 2017	Vasco.com.br
26 May 2017	30 December 2017	(Brazil) Wellington		DF	(Brazil) São Paulo	Loan transfer from São Paulo; Previously end of loan: 31 December 2017	Vasco.com.br
8 June 2017	2 December 2017	(Brazil) Lucas Rocha		DF	(Brazil) Boavista	Loan transfer from Boavista; Previously end of loan: 31 December 2017	Vasco.com.br
30 June 2017	30 June 2018	(Brazil) Bruno Paulista		MF	Sporting de Portugal	Loan transfer from Sporting de Portugal	Vasco.com.br

===== from Youth system =====
Date	Player	Number	Position	Previous club	Fee/notes	Ref
9 April 2017	(Brazil) João Pedro		GK	(Brazil) Vasco da Gama – (U-20)		Vasco.com.br
5 May 2017	(Brazil) Ricardo		DF	(Brazil) Vasco da Gama – (U-20)		Vasco.com.br
5 May 2017	(Brazil) Bruno Cosendey		MF	(Brazil) Vasco da Gama – (U-20)		Vasco.com.br
5 May 2017	(Brazil) Paulo Vitor		FW	(Brazil) Vasco da Gama – (U-20)		Vasco.com.br
19 June 2017	(Brazil) Paulinho		FW	(Brazil) Vasco da Gama – (U-20)		Vasco.com.br

===== On trial (in) =====
Date from	Date to	Player	Number	Position	Previous club	Fee/notes	Ref
28 December 2016	26 June 2017	(Brazil) Júlio César		DF	(Brazil) Vasco da Gama	Vasco da Gama – (B)	
28 December 2016	30 May 2017	(Brazil) Diguinho		MF	(Brazil) Vasco da Gama	Vasco da Gama – (B)	
28 December 2016	4 April 2017	(Brazil) Jorge Henrique		FW	(Brazil) Vasco da Gama	Vasco da Gama – (B)	
2 January 2017	17 March 2017	(Brazil) Juninho		GK	(Brazil) Vasco da Gama – (U-20)	Vasco da Gama – (B)	
6 February 2017	29 June 2018	(Brazil) Bruno Paulista		MF	Sporting de Portugal	Loan transfer from Sporting de Portugal	
21 March 2017	5 June 2017	(Brazil) Eduardo Melo		MF	(Brazil) Baraúnas (loaned from Vasco da Gama)	Vasco da Gama – (B)	
31 May 2017	1 October 2017	(Brazil) Calebe		MF	(Brazil) Alecrim (loaned from Vasco da Gama)	Vasco da Gama – (B)	
31 May 2017		(Brazil) Jussa		MF	(Brazil) Bonsucesso (loaned from Vasco da Gama)	Vasco da Gama – (B)	
1 July 2017		(Brazil) Bruno Ferreira		MF	(Brazil) Red Bull Brasil (loaned from Vasco da Gama)	Vasco da Gama – (B)	

==== Out ====
Date	Player	Number	Position	Destination club	Fee/notes	Ref
13 December 2016	(Brazil) Fellype Gabriel		MF	(Brazil) Boavista		BoavistaSC.com.br
31 December 2016	(Brazil) Jéferson		MF	Retirement	Previously on Vasco da Gama – (B)	
30 December 2016	(Brazil) Aislan		DF	(Brazil) Macaé		MacaeEsporte.com.br
31 December 2016; 23 January 2017	(Brazil) Sandro Silva		FW	(Brazil) Portuguesa	Previously on Oeste on loan from Vasco da Gama	
3 January 2017; 13 January 2017	(Brazil) Erick		DF	(Brazil) Rio Branco (ES)	Previously on São Martinho on loan from Vasco da Gama	
7 January 2017	(Brazil) Victor Bolt		MF	(Brazil) Goiás	Previously on Vila Nova on loan from Vasco da Gama	
13 January 2017; 18 January 2017	(Brazil) Erick Luis		FW	(Brazil) Oeste	Previously on Joinville on loan from Vasco da Gama	
13 January 2017	(Brazil) Junior Dutra		FW	(Brazil) Avaí		
31 January 2017	(Brazil) Emerson Carioca		FW		Previously on Vasco da Gama – (B)	
1 February 2017	(Brazil) Matheus Batista		MF		Previously on Vasco da Gama – (B)	
20 February 2017	(Brazil) Márcio		DF	(Brazil) CSE	Previously on Central (Caruaru) on loan from Vasco da Gama	
6 April 2017	(Brazil) Luan		DF	(Brazil) Palmeiras	R$ 10 million	Palmeiras.com.br
18 April 2017	(Brazil) Jorge Henrique		FW	(Brazil) Figueirense	Previously on Vasco da Gama – (B)	Figueirense.com.br
4 May 2017	(Brazil) Índio		MF	(Portugal) Estoril Praia	R$ 1 million for 30% rights (agreed fee); Previously on Estoril Praia on loan from Vasco da Gama	
9 May 2017	(Brazil) Rodrigo		DF	(Brazil) Ponte Preta		PontePreta.com.br
12 May 2017	(Brazil) Leandrão		FW	(Brazil) Boavista	Previously on Boavista on loan from Vasco da Gama	
16 May 2017; 11 September 2017	(Brazil) Lucas Barboza		DF	(Kuwait) Al Tadhamon	Previously on São Raimundo (PA) on loan from Vasco da Gama	
31 May 2017	(Brazil) Diguinho		MF		Previously on Vasco da Gama – (B)	
2 June 2017	(Brazil) Juninho		GK		Previously on Mogi Mirim on loan from Vasco da Gama	
2 June 2017	(Brazil) Matheus Marcondele		MF		Previously on Marília on loan from Vasco da Gama	
6 June 2017	(Brazil) Eduardo Melo		MF		Previously on Vasco da Gama – (B)	
11 July 2017	(Brazil) Muriqui		FW	(China) Guangzhou Evergrande Taobao		GzEvergrandeFC.com
15 July 2017	(Brazil) Douglas Luiz		MF	(England) Manchester City	€ 13 million	ManCity.com
17 July 2017	(Paraguay) Julio dos Santos		MF	(Paraguay) Sportivo Luqueño		
21 July 2017	(Brazil) Bruno Gallo		MF	Qatar SC		
1 September 2017	(Colombia) Santiago Montoya		MF	(Colombia) Deportes Tolima	Previously on Deportes Tolima on loan from Vasco da Gama	
2 October 2017	(Brazil) Calebe		MF		Previously on Vasco da Gama – (B)	

===== Loan out =====
Date from	Date to	Player	Number	Position	Destination club	Fee/notes	Ref
27 January 2016	11 January 2017	(Brazil) Bruno Cosendey		MF	(Portugal) Vitória (Guimarães)	Previously end of loan: 30 June 2017	
28 June 2016	30 June 2017	(Brazil) Bruno Ferreira		DF	(Brazil) Red Bull Brasil		
29 June 2016	3 May 2017	(Brazil) Índio		MF	(Brazil) Estoril Praia	20% rights Previously end of loan: 30 June 2017	
8 July 2016	31 August 2017	(Colombia) Santiago Montoya		MF	(Colombia) Deportes Tolima	Previously on Vitória (Guimarães) on loan from Vasco da Gama; Previously end of loan: 30 June 2017	
21 December 2016	11 May 2017	(Brazil) Leandrão		FW	(Brazil) Boavista		BoavistaSC.com.br
2 January 2017	31 December 2017	(Brazil) William Barbio		FW	(Brazil) Santa Cruz	Previously on Joinville on loan from Vasco da Gama	SantaCruzPE.com.br
6 January 2017	7 May 2017	(Brazil) Renato Kayser		FW	(Brazil) Villa Nova (MG)	Previously on Portuguesa on loan from Vasco da Gama	
9 January 2017	13 February 2017	(Brazil) Kadu		DF	(Brazil) Tupi		
11 January 2017	30 May 2017	(Brazil) Jussa		MF	(Brazil) Bonsucesso	Previously on Vasco da Gama (U–20)	
13 January 2017	20 March 2017	(Brazil) Eduardo Melo		MF	(Brazil) Baraúnas	Previously on Vasco da Gama (U–20)	OficialBaraunas.blogspot.com.br
21 January 2017	31 May 2017	(Brazil) Matheus Marcondele		MF	(Brazil) Marília	Previously on Vasco da Gama (U–20)	
22 January 2017	30 May 2017	(Brazil) Calebe		MF	(Brazil) Alecrim	Previously on Flamengo (PI) on loan from Vasco da Gama	
30 January 2017	7 May 2017	(Brazil) Lucas Barboza		DF	(Brazil) São Raimundo (PA)	Previously on Vasco da Gama (U–20)	
3 February 2017	31 October 2017	(Brazil) Lorran		DF	(Brazil) Moto Club de São Luís	Previously on Vasco da Gama (U–20)	MotoClubOficial.com.br
18 March 2017	31 May 2017	(Brazil) Juninho		GK	(Brazil) Mogi Mirim	Previously on Vasco da Gama – (B)	
17 May 2017	31 December 2017	(Brazil) Kadu		DF	(Brazil) Boavista	Previously on Tupi on loan from Vasco da Gama	
30 May 2017	31 December 2017	(Brazil) Renato Kayser		FW	(Brazil) Ferroviária	Previously on Villa Nova (MG) on loan from Vasco da Gama	FerroviariaSA.com.br
27 June 2017	31 December 2017	(Brazil) Júlio César		DF	(Brazil) Boavista	Previously on Vasco da Gama – (B)	BoavistaSC.com.br
5 July 2017	31 December 2017	(Brazil) Andrezinho		MF	(Brazil) Goiás		GoiasEC.com.br

== Pre-season and friendlies ==
=== Florida Cup ===
==== Florida Cup squad ====
Note: Flags indicate national team as defined under FIFA eligibility rules; some limited exceptions apply. Players may hold more than one non-FIFA nationality.

No.	Pos.	Nation	Player
1	GK	URU	Martín Silva
2	DF	BRA	Mádson
3	DF	BRA	Rodrigo
4	DF	BRA	Luan
5	MF	BRA	Evander
6	DF	BRA	Alan
7	MF	BRA	Andrezinho
8	FW	BRA	Muriqui
9	FW	BRA	Thalles
10	FW	BRA	Nenê
11	MF	ARG	Damián Escudero
12	GK	BRA	Jordi
13	DF	BRA	Yago Pikachu

No.	Pos.	Nation	Player
14	DF	BRA	Rafael Marques
15	DF	BRA	Jomar
16	MF	PAR	Julio dos Santos
17	FW	BRA	Éder Luís
18	MF	BRA	Marcelo Mattos
19	MF	BRA	Bruno Gallo
20	FW	BRA	Éderson
21	MF	BRA	Andrey
22	MF	BRA	Mateus Vital
23	DF	BRA	Henrique
24	GK	BRA	Gabriel Félix
25	MF	BRA	Guilherme

==== Matches ====
15 January 2017 Quarterfinal	Vasco da Gama (Brazil)	2–1	(Ecuador) Barcelona de Guayaquil	Lauderhill, Florida, United States
14:00 EST (UTC−5)	Nenê 29'; Rodrigo 84'		22' Vera	Stadium: Central Broward Regional Park; Referee: Andres Pfeffenkorn (United States)

18 January 2017 Semifinal	Vasco da Gama (Brazil)	1–4	(Brazil) Corinthians	Orlando, Florida, United States
19:00 EST (UTC−5)	Éder Luís 24'		20' Camacho; 45+1' Marlone; 81' Kazim-Richards; 89' Marquinhos Gabriel	Stadium: Bright House Networks Stadium; Referee: Esteban Rosano (United States)

21 January 2017 Third place match	Vasco da Gama (Brazil)	1–0	(Argentina) River Plate	Orlando, Florida, United States
15:15 EST (UTC−5)	Nenê 74'			Stadium: Bright House Networks Stadium; Referee: Vincent Apple-Chiarella (United States)

== Competitions ==
Times from 1 January to 17 February 2017 and from 15 October to 31 December 2017 are UTC–2, from 18 February 2017 to 14 October 2017 UTC–3.

=== Brasileirão Série A ===
==== League table ====
Pos	Team	Pld	W	D	L	GF	GA	GD	Pts	Qualification or relegation
5	Cruzeiro	38	15	12	11	47	39	+8	57	Qualification for Copa Libertadores group stage
6	Flamengo	38	15	11	12	49	38	+11	56	Qualification for Copa Libertadores group stage
7	Vasco da Gama	38	15	11	12	40	47	−7	56	Qualification for Copa Libertadores second stage
8	Chapecoense	38	15	9	14	47	49	−2	54	Qualification for Copa Libertadores second stage
9	Atlético Mineiro	38	14	12	12	52	49	+3	54	Qualification for Copa Sudamericana first stage

Source: CBF
Rules for classification: 1) points; 2) wins; 3) goal difference; 4) goals scored; 5) head-to-head results; 6) least red cards received; 7) least yellow cards received; 8) draw.

==== Results summary ====
Overall								Home						Away					
Pld	W	D	L	GF	GA	GD	Pts	W	D	L	GF	GA	GD	W	D	L	GF	GA	GD
38	15	11	12	40	47	−7	56	8	7	4	21	21	0	7	4	8	19	26	−7

Last updated: 3 December 2017.
Source: CBF

==== Result round by round ====
Round	1	2	3	4	5	6	7	8	9	10	11	12	13	14	15	16	17	18	19	20	21	22	23	24	25	26	27	28	29	30	31	32	33	34	35	36	37	38
Ground	A	H	H	A	H	H	A	H	A	H	A	H	A	H	A	A	H	H	A	H	A	A	H	A	A	H	A	H	A	H	A	H	A	H	H	A	A	H
Result	L	W	W	L	L	W	L	W	L	W	D	L	W	D	L	W	L	L	D	D	L	W	W	L	D	D	W	W	W	D	D	D	W	D	D	L	W	W
Position	19	14	9	11	13	11	12	6	11	6	6	10	8	9	10	8	8	9	12	13	16	12	8	9	9	10	9	8	8	8	8	8	8	8	8	9	7	7

Updated to match(es) played on 3 December 2017. Source: CBF
A = Away; H = Home; W = Win; D = Draw; L = Loss

==== Matches ====
14 May 2017 I	Palmeiras	4–0	Vasco da Gama	São Paulo
16:00	Jean 6'; Guerra 40'; Borja 46', 79'	Report	(yellow card) 77' Jomar; (yellow card) 90' Douglas Luiz	Stadium: Parque Allianz; Attendance: 33,425; Referee: Rodolpho Marques

21 May 2017 II	Vasco da Gama	2–1	Bahia	Rio de Janeiro
11:00	Yago Pikachu 53'; Luís Fabiano 75' (yellow card) 24'; Jean (yellow card) 21'; Gilberto (yellow card) 90+1'; Silva (yellow card) 90+3'	Report	82' (yellow card) 9' Gustavo; (yellow card) 48' (yellow-red card) 90+1' Armero	Stadium: Estádio Vasco da Gama (São Januário); Attendance: 19,030; Referee: Leandro Bizzio Marinho

27 May 2017 III	Vasco da Gama	3–2	Fluminense	Rio de Janeiro
16:00	Luís Fabiano 24' (yellow card) 63'; Escobar 74'; Nenê 90+3'; Jean (yellow card) 73'	Report	58', 65' Henrique Dourado; (yellow card) 56' Douglas; (yellow card) 90+2' Marquinho; (yellow card) 90+3' Nogueira	Stadium: Estádio Vasco da Gama (São Januário); Attendance: 20,442; Referee: Raphael Claus

4 June 2017 IV	Grêmio	2–0	Vasco da Gama	Porto Alegre
16:00	Barrios 38' (pen.) (yellow card) 49'; Luan 90+2'; Bruno Cortez (yellow card) 47'	Report	(yellow card) 49' Gilberto; (yellow card) 61' Wellington; (yellow card) 90+1' Nenê	Stadium: Arena do Grêmio; Attendance: 22,579; Referee: Sandro Ricci

7 June 2017 V	Vasco da Gama	2–5	Corinthians	Rio de Janeiro
21:45	Luís Fabiano 46', 47'	Report	3' Marquinhos Gabriel; 38' Jô; 58' Maycon; 84', 90+2' Clayton; (yellow card) 11' Clayson; (yellow card) 14' Pablo; (yellow card) 37' Gabriel	Stadium: Estádio Vasco da Gama (São Januário); Attendance: 16,288; Referee: Wagner Reway

10 June 2017 VI	Vasco da Gama	2–1	Sport do Recife	Rio de Janeiro
19:00	Luís Fabiano 62'; Mateus Vital 90'	Report	90+2' André; (yellow card) 43' Osvaldo	Stadium: Estádio Vasco da Gama (São Januário); Attendance: 10,273; Referee: Caio Max Augusto

14 June 2017 VII	Chapecoense	2–1	Vasco da Gama	Chapecó
21:45	Andrei Girotto 28'; Arthur 60'; Rossi (yellow card) 21'; Luiz Antônio (yellow card) 83'; Luiz Otávio (yellow card) 88'	Report	41' Jean; (yellow card) 13' Alan; (yellow card) 33' Henrique	Stadium: Arena Condá; Attendance: 10,003; Referee: Jailson Macedo Freitas

17 June 2017 VIII	Vasco da Gama	1–0	Avaí	Rio de Janeiro
19:00	Yago Pikachu 20'; Evander (yellow card) 20'; Paulão (yellow card) 26'; Nenê (yellow card) 41'; Mateus Vital (yellow card) 75'	Report	(yellow card) 24' Juan	Stadium: Estádio Vasco da Gama (São Januário); Attendance: 10,993; Referee: Rafael Traci

21 June 2017 IX	Botafogo	3–1	Vasco da Gama	Rio de Janeiro
21:00	Roger 4', 60' (yellow card) 84'; Victor Luis 45+3' (yellow card) 52'; Dudu Cearense (yellow card) 80'; Carli (yellow card) 83'; João Paulo (yellow card) 89'	Report	84' Caio Monteiro; (yellow card) 61' Breno	Stadium: Estádio Olímpico Nilton Santos (Engenhão); Attendance: 15,048; Referee: Leandro Vuaden

25 June 2017 X	Vasco da Gama	1–0	Atlético Goianiense	Rio de Janeiro
11:00	Nenê 27'; Douglas Luiz (yellow card) 45'; Luís Fabiano (yellow card) 72'	Report		Stadium: Estádio Vasco da Gama (São Januário); Attendance: 20,658; Referee: Dyorgines Jose de Andrade

2 July 2017 XI	Coritiba	2–2	Vasco da Gama	Curitiba
19:00	Thalles 20'; Wágner 90+1'; Douglas Luiz (yellow card) 36'; Paulão (yellow card) 46'; Jean (yellow card) 68'; Breno (yellow card) 77'; Silva (yellow card) 81'	Report	67', 88' Kléber; (yellow card) 6' Jonas; (yellow card) 27' Bruno Brigido; (yellow card) 53' Anderson	Stadium: Estádio Durival Britto e Silva (Vila Capanema); Attendance: 8,020; Referee: Emerson de Almeida Ferreira

8 July 2017 XII	Vasco da Gama	0–1	Flamengo	Rio de Janeiro
18:00	Paulão (yellow card) 8'; Luís Fabiano (yellow card) 31'; Nenê (yellow card) 36'; Gilberto (yellow card) 90+3'	Report	64' Éverton; (yellow card) 2' Guerrero	Stadium: Estádio Vasco da Gama (São Januário); Attendance: 19,622; Referee: Anderson Daronco

12 July 2017 XIII	Vitória	1–4	Vasco da Gama	Salvador, Bahia
21:45	Kanu 69' (yellow card) 83'; Geferson (yellow card) 10'; Fred (yellow card) 39'; Carlos Eduardo (yellow card) 56'	Report	13' (o.g.) Kanu; 74' (yellow card) 75' Thalles; 88' Paulo Vitor; 90+4' Guilherme; (yellow card) 31' Wellington; (yellow card) 90+1' Andrey	Stadium: Estádio Manoel Barradas (Barradão); Attendance: 5,548; Referee: Antonio Dib Moraes

16 July 2017 XIV	Vasco da Gama	0–0	Santos	Rio de Janeiro
16:00	Rafael Marques (yellow card) 13'; Wellington (yellow card) 31'; Thalles (yellow card) 76'; Breno (yellow card) 77'	Report	(yellow card) 51' Bruno Henrique; (yellow card) 55' (yellow-red card) 83'; (yellow card) 34' Leandro Donizete	Stadium: Estádio Olímpico Nilton Santos (Engenhão); Attendance: Behind closed doors Referee: Dewson Freitas da Silva

19 July 2017 XV	São Paulo	1–0	Vasco da Gama	São Paulo
21:45	Pratto 1'; Gómez (yellow card) 23'; Petros (yellow card) 59'; Lugano (yellow card) 80'	Report	(yellow card) 13' Paulão; (yellow card) 38' Rafael Marques; (yellow card) 90+1' Thalles	Stadium: Estádio Cícero Pompeu de Toledo (Morumbi); Attendance: 22,574; Referee: Wagner Reway

23 July 2017 XVI	Atlético Mineiro	1–2	Vasco da Gama	Belo Horizonte
19:00	Yago 17' (yellow card) 10'; Alex da Silva (yellow card) 46'; Otero (yellow card) 62'; Matheus Mancini (yellow card) 70'; Marlone (yellow card) 72'	Report	13', 67' Paulinho; (yellow card) 16' Escudero; (yellow card) 23' Jomar; (yellow card) 30' Bruno Paulista	Stadium: Estádio Raimundo Sampaio (Independência); Attendance: 12,497; Referee: Raphael Claus

31 July 2017 XVII	Vasco da Gama	0–1	Atlético Paranaense	Volta Redonda
20:00	Bruno Paulista (yellow card) 16'; Jean (yellow card) 20'; Guilherme (yellow card) 27'	Report	60' Ribamar; (yellow card) 37' Matheus Rossetto; (yellow card) 39' Pablo; (yellow card) 83' Felipe Gedoz	Stadium: Estádio Municipal General Sylvio Raulino de Oliveira (Cidadania); Attendance: 8,330; Referee: Claudio Francisco Lima e Silva

3 August 2017 XVIII	Vasco da Gama	0–3	Cruzeiro	Volta Redonda
20:00	Rafael Marques (yellow card) 17'; Paulo Vitor (yellow card) 76'; Gilberto (yellow card) 81'; Ríos (yellow card) 85'	Report	2' Thiago Neves; 16' Sassá; 88' Robinho; (yellow card) 72' Lucas Silva	Stadium: Estádio Municipal General Sylvio Raulino de Oliveira (Cidadania); Attendance: 5,780; Referee: Vinicius Goncalves Araujo

6 August 2017 XIX	Ponte Preta	0–0	Vasco da Gama	Campinas
19:00	Rodrigo (yellow card) 76'	Report	(yellow card) 39' Paulinho; (yellow card) 83' Breno; (yellow card) 87' Gilberto; (yellow card) 90+4' Wellington	Stadium: Estádio Moisés Lucarelli (Majestoso); Attendance: 6,310; Referee: Sandro Ricci

13 August 2017 XX	Vasco da Gama	1–1	Palmeiras	Volta Redonda
16:00	Escobar 87'; Nenê (yellow card) 69'	Report	77' Guerra; (yellow card) 77' Raphael Veiga; (yellow card) 85' Jean	Stadium: Estádio Municipal General Sylvio Raulino de Oliveira (da Cidadania); Attendance: 5,322; Referee: Paulo Roberto Alves Junior

20 August 2017 XXI	Bahia	3–0	Vasco da Gama	Salvador, Bahia
16:00	Tiago 23'; Mendoza 45+3', 46'	Report	Jean (yellow card) 33'; Bruno Paulista (yellow card) 72'; Anderson Martins (yellow card) 78'; Luís Fabiano (yellow card) 81'	Stadium: Itaipava Arena Fonte Nova; Attendance: 21,681; Referee: Raphael Claus

26 August 2017 XXII	Fluminense	0–1	Vasco da Gama	Rio de Janeiro
16:00	Marlon Freitas (yellow card) 43'; Lucas (yellow card) 53'	Report	31' Ramon; (yellow card) 58' Jean; (yellow card) 66' Mádson; (yellow card) 78' Wellington; (yellow card) 90+3' Gilberto	Stadium: Estádio Mário Filho (Maracanã); Attendance: 23,460; Referee: Ricardo Marques

9 September 2017 XXIII	Vasco da Gama	1–0	Grêmio	Rio de Janeiro
18:00	Mateus Vital 42'; Escudero (yellow card) 29'; Wellington (yellow card) 72'; Bruno Paulista (yellow card) 90+1'	Report		Stadium: Estádio Vasco da Gama (São Januário); Attendance: Behind closed doors Referee: Héber Lopes

17 September 2017 24	Corinthians	1–0	Vasco da Gama	São Paulo
16:00	Jô 73'; Romero (yellow card) 16'	Report	(yellow card) 88' Breno; (yellow card) 90+2' Wágner	Stadium: Arena Corinthians; Attendance: 41,235; Referee: Elmo Alves Resende

25 September 2017 25	Sport do Recife	1–1	Vasco da Gama	Recife
20:00	André 84'; Diego Souza (yellow card) 19' (red card) 19'	Report	38' Nenê; (yellow card) 19' Wellington; (yellow card) 32' Jean; (yellow card) 44' Ramon; (yellow card) 90+1' Bruno Paulista	Stadium: Estádio Adelmar da Costa Carvalho (Ilha do Retiro); Attendance: 15,701; Referee: Sandro Ricci

30 September 2017 26	Vasco da Gama	1–1	Chapecoense	Rio de Janeiro
16:00	Ríos 28'; Jean (yellow card) 48'; Breno (yellow card) 68'; Thalles (yellow card) 79'	Report	64' Reinaldo	Stadium: Estádio Vasco da Gama (São Januário); Attendance: Behind closed doors Referee: Wilton Sampaio

11 October 2017 27	Avaí	1–2	Vasco da Gama	Florianópolis
21:45	Betão 62' (yellow card) ht' Willians (red card) (bench); (yellow card) 46' Luanzinho; (yellow card) 53' Judson; Lourenço (yellow card) 73'; Junior Dutra (yellow card) 86'	Report	2' (yellow card) 31' Wágner; 23' (yellow card) 37' (yellow-red card) 61' Ríos; (yellow card) 28' Mádson	Stadium: Estádio Aderbal Ramos da Silva (Ressacada); Attendance: 8,952; Referee: Wagner Reway

14 October 2017 28	Vasco da Gama	1–0	Botafogo	Rio de Janeiro
19:00	Nenê 68' (yellow card) 90+2'; Yago Pikachu (yellow card) 80'; Caio Monteiro (yellow card) 81'; Paulo Vitor (yellow card) 88'; Jean (yellow card) 90'	Report	(yellow card) 67' Marcos Vinícius; (yellow card) 69' Carli; (yellow card) 88' Bruno Silva	Stadium: Estádio Mário Filho (Maracanã); Attendance: 31,406; Referee: Vinicius Goncalves Araujo

18 October 2017 29	Atlético Goianiense	0–1	Vasco da Gama	Goiânia
19:30	André Castro (yellow card) 35'; Andrigo (yellow card) 50'; Niltinho (red card)	Report	30' (o.g.) Jonathan; (yellow card) 23' Bruno Paulista; (yellow card) 46' Yago Pikachu	Stadium: Estádio Serra Dourada; Attendance: 9,046; Referee: Claudio Francisco Lima e Silva

21 October 2017 30	Vasco da Gama	1–1	Coritiba	Rio de Janeiro
17:00	Galdezani 15' (o.g.); Mateus Vital (yellow card) 63'; Breno (red card)	Report	(yellow card) 3' Galdezani; (yellow card) 82' Iago	Stadium: Estádio Mário Filho (Maracanã); Attendance: 30,351; Referee: Raphael Claus

28 October 2017 31	Flamengo	0–0	Vasco da Gama	Rio de Janeiro
19:00	Juan (yellow card) 78'	Report	(yellow card) 77' Wellington	Stadium: Estádio Mário Filho (Maracanã); Attendance: 24,813; Referee: Ricardo Marques

5 November 2017 32	Vasco da Gama	1–1	Vitória	Rio de Janeiro
19:00	Breno 10'; Luís Fabiano (yellow card) 45'; Mádson (yellow card) 56'; Silva (yellow card) 64'	Report	90+1' André Lima; (yellow card) 24' Juninho; (yellow card) 39' Neílton; (yellow card) 45' Kanu; (yellow card) 90+2' Yago	Stadium: Estádio Mário Filho (Maracanã); Attendance: 15,811; Referee: Héber Lopes

8 November 2017 33	Santos	1–2	Vasco da Gama	Santos, São Paulo
21:45	Ricardo Oliveira 64'; Arthur Gomes (yellow card) 38'; Bruno Henrique (yellow card) 90+4'	Report	84' Evander; 90+3' Nenê; (yellow card) 19' Ríos; (yellow card) 33' Paulão; (yellow card) 75' Breno; (yellow card) 90' Wellington; (yellow card) 90+3' (bench) Bruno Paulista	Stadium: Estádio Urbano Caldeira (Vila Belmiro); Attendance: 7,841; Referee: Rafael Traci

12 November 2017 34	Vasco da Gama	1–1	São Paulo	Rio de Janeiro
17:00	Caio Monteiro 75' (yellow card) 90+2'; Henrique (yellow card) 85'	Report	40' Marcos Guilherme; (yellow card) 37' Edimar; (yellow card) 45+1' Arboleda; (red card) Militão	Stadium: Estádio Vasco da Gama (São Januário); Attendance: 17,447; Referee: Leandro Vuaden

15 November 2017 35	Vasco da Gama	1–1	Atlético Mineiro	Rio de Janeiro
21:45	Ríos 25'; Evander (yellow card) 22'	Report	52' Fred	Stadium: Estádio Vasco da Gama (São Januário); Attendance: 12,059; Referee: Flavio Rodrigues de Souza

19 November 2017 36	Atlético Paranaense	3–1	Vasco da Gama	Curitiba
19:00	Thiago Heleno 14'; Douglas Coutinho 63'; Fabrício 68'; Guilherme (yellow card) 32'	Report	16' (o.g.) Wanderson; (yellow card) 11' Jean; (yellow card) 82' Wellington	Stadium: Arena Joaquim Américo Guimarães (da Baixada); Attendance: 9,252; Referee: Leandro Bizzio Marinho

26 November 2017 37	Cruzeiro	0–1	Vasco da Gama	Belo Horizonte
17:00	Bryan (yellow card) 51'; Thiago Neves (yellow card) 78'; Léo (yellow card) 83'	Report	20' Paulão; (yellow card) 50' Wellington; (yellow card) 88' Henrique	Stadium: Estádio Governador Magalhães Pinto (Mineirão); Attendance: 14,930; Referee: Raphael Claus

3 December 2017 38	Vasco da Gama	2–1	Ponte Preta	Rio de Janeiro
17:00	Paulinho 28' (yellow card) 28'; Mateus Vital 73'; Wellington (yellow card) 37'; Anderson Martins (yellow card) 44'; Gilberto (yellow card) 57'; Nenê (yellow card) 66'	Report	89' (pen.) (yellow card) 35' Lucca; (yellow card) 33' Jeferson; (yellow card) 46' Marllon; (yellow card) 53' Nino Paraíba; (yellow card) 87' Elton	Stadium: Estádio Vasco da Gama (São Januário); Attendance: 22,076; Referee: Rafael Traci

=== Copa do Brasil ===
==== Matches ====
9 February 2017 First round	Santos (AP)	0–2	Vasco da Gama	Natal, Rio Grande do Norte
21:00			21' (pen.), 90' (pen.) Nenê	Stadium: Arena das Dunas; Attendance: 5,321; Referee: Luiz César de Oliveira Magalhães

1 March 2017 Second round	Vila Nova	1–2	Vasco da Gama	Goiânia
21:45	Wallyson 32'		16' Thalles; 85' Wágner	Stadium: Estádio Serra Dourada; Attendance: 15,613; Referee: Leandro Vuaden

9 March 2017 Third round: leg I	Vasco da Gama	1–1	Vitória	Rio de Janeiro
19:15	Nenê 90+3' (pen.)		16' Patrick	Stadium: Estádio Vasco da Gama (São Januário); Attendance: 9,883; Referee: Elmo Alves Resende Cunha

16 March 2017 Third round: leg II	Vitória	1–0 (2–1 agg.)	Vasco da Gama	Salvador, Bahia
19:30	Alan Costa 59'			Stadium: Estádio Manoel Barradas (Barradão); Attendance: 18,264; Referee: Dewson Fernando Freitas da Silva

== Statistics ==
=== Squad appearances and goals ===
Last updated on 3 December 2017.

No.	Pos	Nat	Player	Total		Brasileirão Série A		Copa do Brasil		Rio de Janeiro State Championship		Other (Note: Includes appearances in Florida Cup and friendlies.)	
No.	Pos	Nat	Player	Apps	Goals	Apps	Goals	Apps	Goals	Apps	Goals	Apps	Goals
Goalkeepers
	GK	(Brazil) BRA	Gabriel Félix	3	0	3	0	0	0	0	0	0	0
	GK	(Brazil) BRA	João Pedro	0	0	0	0	0	0	0	0	0	0
	GK	(Brazil) BRA	Jordi	4	0	0+1	0	0	0	3	0	0	0
	GK	(Uruguay) URU	Martín Silva	51	0	35	0	4	0	12	0	0	0
Defenders
	DF	(Brazil) BRA	Alan	5	0	1	0	1	0	3	0	0	0
	DF	(Brazil) BRA	Anderson Martins	14	0	14	0	0	0	0	0	0	0
	DF	(Brazil) BRA	Breno	25	1	24+1	1	0	0	0	0	0	0
	DF	(Brazil) BRA	Gilberto	41	0	24+2	0	3	0	12	0	0	0
	DF	(Brazil) BRA	Henrique	36	0	20+1	0	3	0	12	0	0	0
	DF	(Brazil) BRA	Jomar	11	0	3+2	0	0+2	0	4	0	0	0
	DF	(Brazil) BRA	Lucas Rocha	2	0	2	0	0	0	0	0	0	0
	DF	(Brazil) BRA	Mádson	20	0	17+2	0	0	0	1	0	0	0
	DF	(Brazil) BRA	Paulão	24	1	22+2	1	0	0	0	0	0	0
	DF	(Brazil) BRA	Rafael Marques	27	1	12+3	0	3	0	8+1	1	0	0
	DF	(Brazil) BRA	Ramon	17	1	17	1	0	0	0	0	0	0
	DF	(Brazil) BRA	Ricardo	0	0	0	0	0	0	0	0	0	0
	DF	(Brazil) BRA	Yago Pikachu	40	5	23+4	2	1+1	0	9+2	3	0	0
Midfielders
	MF	(Brazil) BRA	Andrey	4	0	0+4	0	0	0	0	0	0	0
	MF	(Brazil) BRA	Bruno Cosendey	1	0	0+1	0	0	0	0	0	0	0
	MF	(Brazil) BRA	Bruno Paulista	10	0	6+4	0	0	0	0	0	0	0
	MF	(Argentina) ARG	Damián Escudero	20	1	5+2	0	3+1	0	4+5	1	0	0
	MF	(Brazil) BRA	Evander	12	0	3+6	0	0	0	3	0	0	0
	MF	(Brazil) BRA	Guilherme	21	2	1+8	1	2+1	0	5+4	1	0	0
	MF	(Brazil) BRA	Jean	50	1	32+2	1	4	0	11+1	0	0	0
	MF	(Brazil) BRA	Marcelo Mattos	0	0	0	0	0	0	0	0	0	0
	MF	(Brazil) BRA	Mateus Vital	30	2	28+2	2	0	0	0	0	0	0
	MF	(Brazil) BRA	Wágner	29	3	12+7	2	1	1	2+7	0	0	0
	MF	(Brazil) BRA	Wellington	26	0	24+2	0	0	0	0	0	0	0
Forwards
	FW	(Brazil) BRA	Caio Monteiro	6	2	0+6	2	0	0	0	0	0	0
	FW	(Brazil) BRA	Éder Luís	5	0	0+4	0	0	0	1	0	0	0
	FW	(Colombia) COL	Andrés Ramiro Escobar	19	2	2+12	2	0+1	0	0+4	0	0	0
	FW	(Brazil) BRA	Kelvin	15	0	4+1	0	2+2	0	5+1	0	0	0
	FW	(Brazil) BRA	Luís Fabiano	20	6	12	5	1	0	7	1	0	0
	FW	(Brazil) BRA	Nenê	49	11	25+6	5	3	3	15	3	0	0
	FW	(Brazil) BRA	Paulinho	18	3	12+6	3	0	0	0	0	0	0
	FW	(Brazil) BRA	Paulo Vitor	13	1	4+9	1	0	0	0	0	0	0
	FW	(Argentina) ARG	Andrés Ríos	17	3	15+2	3	0	0	0	0	0	0
	FW	(Brazil) BRA	Thalles	26	6	5+7	2	3+1	1	6+4	3	0	0
Players who have made an appearance or had a squad number this season but have transferred or loaned out during the season
	DF	(Brazil) BRA	Luan	8	0	0	0	2	0	6	0	0	0
	DF	(Brazil) BRA	Rodrigo	14	1	0	0	3	0	11	1	0	0
	FW	(Brazil) BRA	Éderson	4	0	0	0	0	0	0+4	0	0	0
	MF	(Brazil) BRA	Andrezinho	11	0	0+2	0	1	0	7+1	0	0	0
	FW	(Brazil) BRA	Muriqui	11	0	0+2	0	0+2	0	2+5	0	0	0
	MF	(Brazil) BRA	Douglas Luiz	24	3	11	1	3	0	10	2	0	0
	MF	(Paraguay) PAR	Julio dos Santos	6	0	0	0	0	0	3+3	0	0	0
	MF	(Brazil) BRA	Bruno Gallo	7	0	0+1	0	1	0	3+2	0	0	0
