= William Oliveira =

William Oliveira (or Willian Oliveira) is a given name. Notable people with the name include:

- William Oliveira (footballer, born 1982), full name William Artur de Oliveira, Brazilian football coach and former midfielder
- William Oliveira (footballer, born 1984), full name William da Silva Oliveira, a Brazilian footballer
- William Oliveira (footballer, born 1992), full name William Oliveira dos Santos, a Brazilian footballer
- Willian Oliveira (born 1993), full name Willian Osmar de Oliveira Silva, a Brazilian football defensive midfielder
