= Guilherme Costa =

Guilherme Costa may refer to:

- Guilherme Posser da Costa (born 1953), former prime minister of São Tomé and Príncipe
- Guilherme Costa (footballer) (born 1994), Brazilian football attacking midfielder
- Guilherme Costa (swimmer) (born 1998), Brazilian swimmer

== See also ==
- Guilherme (footballer, born May 1991), Guilherme Costa Marques, Brazilian football midfielder
