= Yago Pikachu =

Brazilian footballer (born 1992)

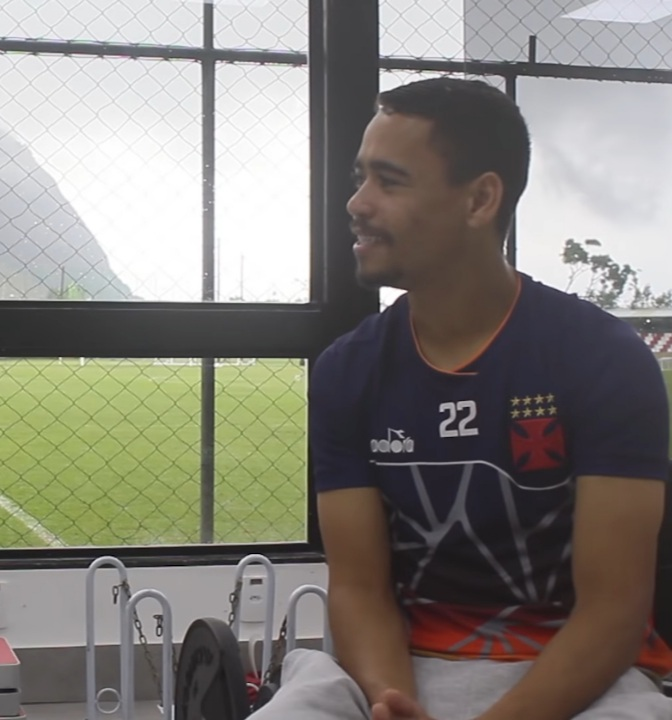
- Yago Pikachu with Vasco da Gama

Personal information
- Full name: Glaybson Yago Souza Lisboa
- Date of birth: 5 June 1992 (age 34)
- Place of birth: Belém, Brazil
- Height: 1.69 m (5 ft 6 1/2 in)
- Positions: Winger; right-back

Team information
- Current team: Remo
- Number: 22

Youth career
- 2001–2005: Tuna Luso
- 2005–2012: Paysandu

Senior career*
Years	Team	Apps	(Gls)
2012–2015	Paysandu	178	(52)
2016–2021	Vasco da Gama	208	(32)
2021–2022	Fortaleza	58	(18)
2022–2023	Shimizu S-Pulse	12	(0)
2023	→ Fortaleza (loan)	46	(8)
2024–2025	Fortaleza	79	(9)
2026–	Remo	15	(3)
- * Club domestic league appearances and goals as of 9 April 2026

Glaybson Yago Souza Lisboa (born 5 June 1992), professionally known as Yago Pikachu (pronounced [ˈjagu ˈpikatʃu]), is a Brazilian professional footballer who plays as a winger or right-back for Campeonato Brasileiro Série A club Remo.

== Club career ==
=== Paysandu ===
Born in Belém, Pará, Yago Pikachu joined Paysandu's youth setup in 2005 at the age of 13, after starting it out at Tuna Luso. He earned the nickname Pikachu for his speed and small size. After being promoted to the main squad, he made his senior debut on 14 January 2012, starting in a 1–2 Campeonato Paraense home loss against Cametá.

Yago Pikachu scored his first senior goal on 25 January, netting the first in a 1–2 away loss against Águia de Marabá. He finished the tournament with four goals, and also scored regularly in the year's Série C, as his side returned to Série B after six years.

Yago Pikachu made his debut in the second division on 25 May 2013, starting in a 1–1 home draw against ASA. He scored his first goal in the category six days later, netting the first against América-RN which ended in the same scoreline.

Despite scoring nine goals, Yago Pikachu could not avoid his team's relegation as it finished 18th. He again helped the side in its promotion the following year, contributing with four goals in 22 matches.

On 12 June 2015, Yago Pikachu scored an olympic goal in a 2–0 away win against ABC. He completed 200 games for Paysandu on 15 August, but in a 3–1 home win against Oeste.

=== Vasco da Gama ===
On 16 December 2015, Yago Pikachu signed a three-year deal with fellow second-tier club Vasco da Gama. Mainly used as a substitute in the midfield during the year, he contributed with three goals in 27 matches as his side achieved promotion to Série A.

Yago Pikachu made his top tier debut on 14 May 2017, starting in a 4–0 away loss against Palmeiras. Seven days later he scored his first goal in the division, netting the opener in a 2–0 home win against Bahia. He completed the 2017 season with two goals in 27 games.

== Career statistics ==
As of match played 27 May 2024

Club	Season	League			State league		Cup		Continental		Other		Total	
Club	Season	Division	Apps	Goals	Apps	Goals	Apps	Goals	Apps	Goals	Apps	Goals	Apps	Goals
Paysandu	2012	Série C	19	6	15 (Note: Appearances in Campeonato Paraense)	4	5	2	—		—		39	12
Paysandu	2013	Série B	35	9	21	6	4	0	—		—		60	15
Paysandu	2014	Série C	22	4	20	9	5	1	—		7 (Note: Appearances in Copa Verde)	1	54	15
Paysandu	2015	Série B	35	9	11	5	8	4	—		5	2	59	20
Paysandu	Total		111	28	67	24	22	7	—		12	3	212	62
Vasco da Gama	2016	Série B	27	3	11 (Note: Appearances in Campeonato Carioca)	0	8	1	—		—		46	4
Vasco da Gama	2017	Série A	27	2	11	3	2	0	—		—		40	5
Vasco da Gama	2018	Série A	35	10	11	4	2	1	11 (Note: Ten appearances and four goals in Copa Libertadores, one appearance in Copa Sudamericana)	4	—		59	19
Vasco da Gama	2019	Série A	36	5	13	3	6	1	—		—		55	9
Vasco da Gama	2020	Série A	28	2	9	0	6	0	5 (Note: Appearances in Copa Sudamericana)	0	—		48	2
Vasco da Gama	Total		153	22	55	10	24	3	16	4	—		248	39
Fortaleza	2021	Série A	34	9	4 (Note: Appearances in Campeonato Cearense)	1	8	2	—		4 (Note: Appearances in Copa do Nordeste)	0	50	12
Fortaleza	2022	Série A	14	4	6	4	4	3	8 (Note: Appearances in Copa Libertadores)	2	12	4	44	17
Fortaleza	Total		48	13	10	5	12	5	8	2	16	4	94	29
Shimizu S-Pulse	2022	J.League	12	0	—		0	0	—		0	0	12	0
Fortaleza	2023	Série A	37	7	9	1	4	1	15 (Note: Two appearances in Copa Libertadores, thirteen appearances and three goals in Copa Sudamericana)	3	9	1	74	13
Fortaleza	2024	Série A	5	0	8	3	4	0	5	4	8	3	30	10
Career total			366	70	149	43	66	16	45	13	45	11	670	153

== Honours ==
Paysandu

- Campeonato Paraense: 2013

Vasco da Gama

- Campeonato Carioca: 2016

Fortaleza

- Campeonato Cearense: 2021, 2022, 2023
- Copa do Nordeste: 2022, 2024

Remo

- Super Copa Grão-Pará: 2026

=== Individual ===
- Campeonato Carioca Team of the Year: 2018
- Campeonato Brasileiro Série A Team or the Year: 2021
- Best Right-back in Brazil: 2021
