= Alan Cardoso =

Brazilian footballer (born 1998)

Personal information
- Full name: Alan Cardoso de Andrade
- Date of birth: 5 January 1998 (age 28)
- Place of birth: Rio de Janeiro, Brazil
- Height: 1.75 m (5 ft 9 in)
- Position: Left back

Youth career
- 2006–2017: Vasco da Gama

Senior career*
| Years | Team | Apps | (Gls) |
| 2016–2019 | Vasco da Gama | 14 | (0) |
| 2018 | → ABC (loan) | 4 | (0) |
| 2019–2021 | Santos | 0 | (0) |
| 2020–2021 | → Londrina (loan) | 13 | (0) |
| 2021 | Santa Cruz | 9 | (0) |
| 2021 | Paysandu | 0 | (0) |
| 2021–2022 | Resende | 4 | (0) |
| 2022–2023 | Ipatinga | 14 | (0) |
| 2023 | Náutico | 0 | (0) |
| 2023 | Novo Hamburgo | 8 | (0) |
| 2023–2024 | Avenida | 11 | (2) |
| 2025 | Confiança | 7 | (0) |
| 2025–2026 | Persija Jakarta | 18 | (0) |
| 2026 | Bhayangkara Presisi | 2 | (0) |

International career^{‡}
| 2014 | Brazil U17 | 2 | (0) |
- * Club domestic league appearances and goals as of 7 February 2026 ‡ National team caps and goals as of 01:44, 14 April 2022 (UTC)

Alan Cardoso de Andrade (born 5 January 1998), known as Alan Cardoso (Brazilian Portuguese: [aˈlɐn kaʁˈdozu]) or simply Alan, is a Brazilian professional footballer. Mainly a left back, he can also play as a left midfielder.

== Club career ==
=== Vasco da Gama ===
Alan Cardoso was born in Rio de Janeiro, and joined Vasco da Gama's youth setup in 2006 at the age of eight. On 16 July 2016, he made his first team debut by starting in a 1–1 Série B away draw against Luverdense.

Alan Cardoso contributed with nine appearances (three starts) during his first season, as his side achieved promotion to the Série A. He made his debut in that category on 15 June 2017, starting in a 2–1 loss at Chapecoense; playing as a midfielder, he was replaced by Andrezinho in the 27th minute after being booked early in the match.

On 25 April 2018, Alan Cardoso was loaned to Série C side ABC until the end of the year. In August, however, he suffered a knee injury and returned to his parent club for treatment.

=== Santos ===
On 28 February 2019, Alan Cardoso signed a three-year contract with Santos. Assigned to the B-team, he was loaned to Londrina on 20 July 2020.

== Career statistics ==
As of 3 February 2021

| Club | Season | League | | | State League | | Cup | | Conmebol | | Other | | Total | |
| Club | Season | Division | Apps | Goals | Apps | Goals | Apps | Goals | Apps | Goals | Apps | Goals | Apps | Goals |
|---|---|---|---|---|---|---|---|---|---|---|---|---|---|---|
| Vasco da Gama | 2016 | Série B | 9 | 0 | 0 | 0 | 1 | 0 | — | | — | | 10 | 0 |
| Vasco da Gama | 2017 | Série A | 1 | 0 | 3 | 0 | 1 | 0 | — | | — | | 5 | 0 |
| Vasco da Gama | 2018 | Série A | 0 | 0 | 1 | 0 | 0 | 0 | — | | — | | 1 | 0 |
| Vasco da Gama | Subtotal | | 10 | 0 | 4 | 0 | 2 | 0 | — | | — | | 16 | 0 |
| ABC (loan) | 2018 | Série C | 4 | 0 | — | | — | | — | | — | | 4 | 0 |
| Santos | 2019 | Série A | 0 | 0 | 0 | 0 | 0 | 0 | — | | — | | 0 | 0 |
| Londrina (loan) | 2020 | Série C | 13 | 0 | 0 | 0 | — | | — | | — | | 13 | 0 |
| Career total | | | 27 | 0 | 4 | 0 | 2 | 0 | 0 | 0 | 0 | 0 | 33 | 0 |
