= Jean (footballer, born 1994) =

Brazilian footballer

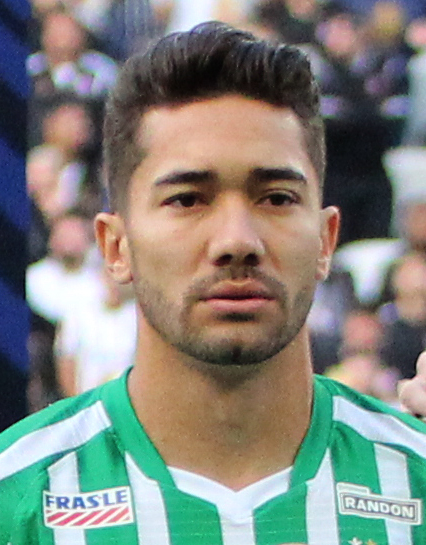

Personal information
- Full name: Jean Carlos de Souza Irmer
- Date of birth: 26 September 1994 (age 32)
- Place of birth: Taguatinga, Federal District, Brazil
- Height: 1.83 m (6 ft 0 in)
- Position: Defensive midfielder

Team information
- Current team: Novorizontino
- Number: 5

Youth career
- 2012: Iguaçu Agex
- 2012–2013: Estudiantes
- 2014: Paraná

Senior career*
Years	Team	Apps	(Gls)
2014–2016	Paraná	79	(5)
2016–2020	Corinthians	2	(0)
2017	→ Vasco da Gama (loan)	50	(1)
2018–2019	→ Botafogo (loan)	37	(1)
2020	→ Vitória (loan)	18	(1)
2020–2021	Marítimo	26	(0)
2021–2022	Gil Vicente	2	(0)
2022–2023	Juventude	59	(5)
2024	Ceará	20	(0)
2025–	Novorizontino	33	(4)
- * Club domestic league appearances and goals as of 16 December 2025

Jean Carlos de Souza Irmer (born 26 September 1994), simply known as Jean, is a Brazilian professional footballer who plays as a defensive midfielder for Novorizontino.

== Career ==
Jean started his career in his hometown, Taguatinga, Federal District, playing in amateur leagues. In 2012, he moved to Iguaçu Agex in Curitiba. Shortly after, he was acquired by the Argentinean club Estudiantes de La Plata. He participated in their youth squads, but did not have that many chances in the professional team which ultimately prompted his return to Brazil's Paraná.

He was a regular member of the team until August 2016, when he signed with the defending national champions — Sport Club Corinthians Paulista for a rumored fee of R$400,000.

On 22 September 2020, Jean Irmer signed with Marítimo.

On 14 July 2021, he moved to Gil Vicente on the basis of a two-year deal.

== Career statistics ==
As of 27 November 2019.

Club	Season	League			State League		Cup		Continental		Other		Total	
Club	Season	Division	Apps	Goals	Apps	Goals	Apps	Goals	Apps	Goals	Apps	Goals	Apps	Goals
Paraná	2014	Série B	15	3	—		—		—		—		15	3
Paraná	2015	Série B	27	0	12	1	2	0	—		—		41	1
Paraná	2016	Série B	6	0	14	0	3	1	—		—		23	1
Paraná	Subtotal		48	3	26	1	5	1	—		—		79	5
Corinthians	2016	Série A	2	0	—		—		—		—		2	0
Corinthians	2018	Série A	0	0	0	0	0	0	—		—		0	0
Corinthians	Subtotal		2	0	0	0	0	0	—		—		2	0
Vasco (loan)	2017	Série A	34	1	12	0	4	0	—		—		50	1
Botafogo (loan)	2018	Série A	15	1	—		—		2 (Note: Appearance(s) in Copa Sudamericana)	0	—		17	1
Botafogo (loan)	2019	Série A	5	0	6	0	3	0	3	0	—		17	0
Botafogo (loan)	Subtotal		20	1	6	0	3	0	5	0	—		34	1
Career total			104	5	44	1	12	1	4	0	0	0	165	7

== Honours ==
Ceará

- Campeonato Cearense: 2024
