= Rafael França =

Brazilian footballer

Personal information
- Full name: Rafael de Carvalho França
- Date of birth: 17 March 1998 (age 28)
- Place of birth: Rio de Janeiro, Brazil
- Height: 1.71 m (5 ft 7 in)
- Positions: Right back; defensive midfielder

Team information
- Current team: Pérolas Negras

Youth career
- –2018: Vasco da Gama

Senior career*
Years	Team	Apps	(Gls)
2018–2020	Vasco da Gama	2	(0)
2020	→ Paraná (loan)	4	(0)
2021	Maricá		
2022	Londrina	3	(0)
2022	Atlético Catarinense		
2022	Barra da Tijuca		
2023	Estrela do Norte	10	(0)
2023–	Pérolas Negras		
- * Club domestic league appearances and goals as of 26 March 2023

Rafael de Carvalho França (born 17 March 1998) is a Brazilian footballer who plays as a right back for Pérolas Negras.

== Career statistics ==
=== Club ===
As of 26 October 2019.

Club	Season	League			State league		Cup		Continental		Other		Total	
Club	Season	Division	Apps	Goals	Apps	Goals	Apps	Goals	Apps	Goals	Apps	Goals	Apps	Goals
Vasco da Gama	2018	Série A	0	0	1 (Note: Appearances in the Campeonato Carioca)	0	0	0	0	0	0	0	1	0
Vasco da Gama	2019	Série A	0	0	1	0	0	0	0	0	0	0	1	0
Career total			0	0	2	0	0	0	0	0	0	0	2	0
