= Andrey (footballer, born February 1998) =

Brazilian footballer

Personal information
- Full name: Andrey Ramos do Nascimento
- Date of birth: 15 February 1998 (age 28)
- Place of birth: Rio de Janeiro, Brazil
- Height: 1.75 m (5 ft 9 in)
- Position: Centre midfielder

Team information
- Current team: Santa Cruz
- Number: 15

Youth career
- 2011–2016: Vasco da Gama

Senior career*
Years	Team	Apps	(Gls)
2016–2021	Vasco da Gama	133	(9)
2022–2025	Coritiba	19	(4)
2024	→ Ceará (loan)	10	(0)
2025	Athletic	5	(0)
2026–	Santa Cruz	12	(0)

International career^{‡}
2014-2015	Brazil U17	17	(5)
- * Club domestic league appearances and goals as of 9 November 2026 ‡ National team caps and goals as of 30 May 2017

Andrey Ramos do Nascimento (born 15 February 1998), simply known as Andrey, is a Brazilian footballer who plays as a centre midfielder for Santa Cruz.

== Club career ==
Andrey made his professional debut for Vasco da Gama at 18 in a 2016 Serie B game against Luverdense, coming on as a halftime substitute for Caio Monteiro, he would eventually solidify himself in the first team making 27 appearances in the 2018 Season, this string of appearances came after he assisted in first game of the season against Paraná and would go on to score three goals in the next four games. He would go on to make 125 appearances, scoring nine times for the club.

In February 2022, Andrey signed a two-year contract with Coritiba, making 21 appearances before suffering a torn knee ligament in May during a training session, which kept him out for the rest of the year.

In 2025, despite a preliminary agreement with the team, Cong An Hanoi FC decided against signing him, opting to sign Leygley Adou instead. Andrey Ramos' representative claims that Cong An Hanoi still has a financial obligation with him. On 16 September 2026, FIFA banned Cong An Hanoi in the transfer market, prohibiting the team from signing new players until 2028 unless the case is settled.

== International career ==
Andrey made his U-17 debut for Brazil in November 2014, scoring against Australia in a friendly. He played every game, scoring twice, as Brazil won the 2015 South American U-17 Championship. In the 2015 FIFA U-17 World Cup, Andrey played every group game before being suspended for the Round of 16 game against New Zealand after accumulating too many yellow cards. He returned for the quarter-final against Nigeria which Brazil lost 3–0.

== Career statistics ==
=== Club ===
As of match played 1 June 2025

Appearances and goals by club, season and competition
Club	Season	League			State league		Copa do Brasil		Continental		Total	
Club	Season	Division	Apps	Goals	Apps	Goals	Apps	Goals	Apps	Goals	Apps	Goals
Vasco da Gama	2016	Série B	1	0	0	0	1	0	—		2	0
Vasco da Gama	2017	Série A	4	0	0	0	0	0	—		4	0
Vasco da Gama	2018	Série A	27	4	6 (Note: Appearance(s) in Campeonato Carioca)	1	2	1	3 (Note: One appearance in Copa Libertadores, Two appearances in Copa Sudamericana)	0	38	6
Vasco da Gama	2019	Série A	17	1	4	0	2	0	—		23	1
Vasco da Gama	2020	Série A	27	1	8	1	5	0	4 (Note: Appearance(s) in Copa Sudamericana)	0	44	2
Vasco da Gama	2021	Série B	28	1	11	0	4	1	—		43	2
Vasco da Gama	Total		104	7	29	2	14	2	7	0	154	11
Coritiba	2022	Série A	6	3	11 (Note: Appearance(s) in Campeonato Paulista)	1	4	0	—		21	4
Coritiba	2023	Série A	26	1	2	0	2	0	—		30	1
Coritiba	2024	Série B	1	0	6	0	0	0	—		7	0
Coritiba	Total		33	4	19	1	6	0	0	0	58	5
Ceará (loan)	2024	Série B	10	0	0	0	0	0	—		10	0
Athletic	2025	Série B	5	0	0	0	0	0	—		5	0
Maccabi Netanya	2025–26	Israeli Premier League	0	0	0	0	0	0	—		0	0
Career total			152	11	48	3	20	2	7	0	227	16

== Honours ==
=== Club ===
Vasco Da Gama

- Taça Guanabara: 2016 e 2019
- Campeonato Carioca: 2016
- Taça Rio: 2017 e 2021

Coritiba

- Campeonato Paranaense: 2022

=== International ===
Brazil U17

- South American Under-17 Football Championship: 2015
