= Bruno Paulista =

Brazilian footballer (born 1995)

Personal information
- Full name: Bruno Jacinto da Silva
- Date of birth: 21 August 1995 (age 31)
- Place of birth: Nova Odessa, Brazil
- Height: 1.90 m (6 ft 3 in)
- Position: Defensive midfielder

Youth career
- São Paulo
- Santo André
- Ypiranga-BA
- 2012–2014: Bahia

Senior career*
Years	Team	Apps	(Gls)
2014–2015	Bahia	34	(2)
2015–2021	Sporting CP	4	(0)
2015–2021	Sporting CP B	3	(0)
2017–2018	→ Vasco da Gama (loan)	14	(0)
2019	→ Londrina (loan)	4	(0)
2020	→ Fátima (loan)	0	(0)
2021	Paysandu	20	(1)
2022	CSA	2	(0)
Medal record
Representing Brazil
Men's Football
Pan American Games
Bronze medal – third place	2015 Toronto	Team competition
- * Club domestic league appearances and goals as of 00:50, 11 May 2022 (UTC)

Bruno Jacinto da Silva (born 21 August 1995), known as Bruno Paulista, is a Brazilian professional footballer who plays as a defensive midfielder who is a free agent.

== Career ==
Bruno Paulista was born in Nova Odessa, São Paulo, and graduated with Bahia's youth setup, after stints at São Paulo, Santo André and Ypiranga-BA. On 6 August 2014, he made his first-team debut, coming on as a late substitute in a 1–0 home win against Corinthians, for the season's Copa do Brasil.

Bruno Paulista made his Série A debut on 18 October, starting in a 2–1 away loss against São Paulo. On 10 February 2015, he renewed his link until 2018.

On 7 August 2015, Bruno Paulista moved to Sporting CP, signing a six-year deal. Sporting paid €3.5 million for 65% of his rights, with a 45 million clause.
