= 2017 Copa do Brasil Third Round =

The 2017 Copa do Brasil Third Round was played from 8 March to 5 April 2017, to decide the 10 teams advancing to the Fourth Round. In this year, each match was played on a home-and-away two-legged basis. If tied on aggregate, the away goals rule would be used. If still tied, extra time would not be played, and the penalty shoot-out would be used to determine the winner. Hosting was determined by a draw.

== Matches ==
Team 1	Agg.	Team 2	1st leg	2nd leg
Boavista (Rio de Janeiro (state))	0–4	(Pernambuco) Sport	0–3	0–1
Joinville (Santa Catarina (state))	3–2	(Tocantins) Gurupi	3–1	0–1
Murici (Alagoas)	0–5	(Minas Gerais) Cruzeiro	0–2	0–3
Criciúma (Santa Catarina (state))	3–4	(Rio de Janeiro (state)) Fluminense	1–1	2–3
Sampaio Corrêa (Maranhão)	1–7	(Rio Grande do Sul) Internacional	1–4	0–3
Luverdense (Mato Grosso)	1–3	(São Paulo (state)) Corinthians	0–2	1–1
Goiás	5–1	(Mato Grosso) Cuiabá	4–0	1–1
Vasco da Gama (Rio de Janeiro (state))	1–2	(Bahia) Vitória	1–1	0–1
ASA (Alagoas)	0–0 (1–4 p)	(Paraná (state)) Paraná	0–0	0–0
São Paulo (São Paulo (state))	4–2	(Rio Grande do Norte) ABC	3–1	1–1

=== Match 61 ===
March 8, 2017
21:45 UTC−03:00

Boavista (Rio de Janeiro (state))	0–3	(Pernambuco) Sport
	Report	André 19', 74'; Diego Souza 30' (pen.)

Estádio Elcyr Resende de Mendonça, Saquarema
Attendance: 619
Referee: Marcelo Aparecido Ribeiro de Souza (São Paulo)

March 15, 2017
21:45 UTC−03:00

Sport (Pernambuco)	1–0	(Rio de Janeiro (state)) Boavista
Diego Souza 33'	Report

Estádio Ilha do Retiro, Recife
Attendance: 2,014
Referee: Edmar Campos Encarnação (Amazonas)

Sport won 4–0 on aggregate and advanced to the fourth round.

=== Match 62 ===
March 8, 2017
20:30 UTC−03:00

Joinville (Santa Catarina (state))	3–1	(Tocantins) Gurupi
Breno 42'; Marlyson 86'; Aldair 90+2' (pen.)	Report	Renan Teixeira 45' (o.g.)

Arena Joinville, Joinville
Attendance: 3,360
Referee: Claudio Francisco Lima e Silva (Sergipe)

March 15, 2017
20:30 UTC−03:00

Gurupi (Tocantins)	1–0	(Santa Catarina (state)) Joinville
Ederson 58'	Report

Estádio Gilberto Resende, Gurupi
Attendance: 2,005
Referee: Eduardo Tomaz de Aquino Valadão (Goiás)

Joinville won 3–2 on aggregate and advanced to the fourth round.

=== Match 63 ===
March 8, 2017
21:45 UTC−03:00

Murici (Alagoas)	0–2	(Minas Gerais) Cruzeiro
	Report	Manoel 73'; Ábila 89'

Estádio José Gomes da Costa, Murici
Attendance: 2,893
Referee: Jean Pierre Gonçalves Lima (Rio Grande do Sul

March 15, 2017
21:45 UTC−03:00

Cruzeiro (Minas Gerais)	3–0	(Alagoas) Murici
Cláudio 32' (o.g.); Rafael Sóbis 38' (pen.); Delsinho 84' (o.g.)	Report

Mineirão, Belo Horizonte
Attendance: 9,106
Referee: Savio Pereira Sampaio (Distrito Federal)

Cruzeiro won 5–0 on aggregate and advanced to the fourth round.

=== Match 64 ===
March 9, 2017
19:15 UTC−03:00

Criciúma (Santa Catarina (state))	1–1	(Rio de Janeiro (state)) Fluminense
Alex Maranhão 33'	Report	Wellington 15'

Estádio Heriberto Hülse, Criciúma
Attendance: 5,476
Referee: Flavio Rodrigues de Souza (São Paulo)

March 15, 2017
19:30 UTC−03:00

Fluminense (Rio de Janeiro (state))	3–2	(Santa Catarina (state)) Criciúma
Douglas 15'; Henrique Dourado 19' (pen.); Sornoza 62'	Report	Diego Giaretta 29'; Silvinho 88'

Estádio Giulite Coutinho, Mesquita
Attendance: 6,968
Referee: Leandro Pedro Vuaden (Rio Grande do Sul)

Fluminense won 4–3 on aggregate and advanced to the fourth round.

=== Match 65 ===
March 8, 2017
21:45 UTC−03:00

Sampaio Corrêa (Maranhão)	1–4	(Rio Grande do Sul) Internacional
Daniel Barros 57'	Report	Paulão 35'; Nico López 50'; Brenner 64', 66'

Castelão, São Luís
Attendance: 8,377
Referee: Jailson Macedo Freitas (Bahia)

March 15, 2017
21:45 UTC−03:00

Internacional (Rio Grande do Sul)	3–0	(Maranhão) Sampaio Corrêa
Carlos 42', 69'; D'Alessandro 75'	Report

Estádio Beira-Rio, Porto Alegre
Attendance: 8,964
Referee: Rodrigo D'Alonso Ferreira (Santa Catarina)

Internacional won 7–1 on aggregate and advanced to the fourth round.

=== Match 66 ===
March 9, 2017
21:30 UTC−03:00

Luverdense (Mato Grosso)	0–2	(São Paulo (state)) Corinthians
	Report	Rodriguinho 21'; Gabriel 25'

Arena Pantanal, Cuiabá
Attendance: 13,324
Referee: Leonardo Garcia Cavaleiro (Rio de Janeiro)

March 16, 2017
19:30 UTC−03:00

Corinthians (São Paulo (state))	1–1	(Mato Grosso) Luverdense
Jô 30'	Report	Ricardo 72'

Arena Corinthians, São Paulo
Attendance: 25,082
Referee: Paulo Henrique Schleich Vollkopf (Mato Grosso do Sul)

Corinthians won 3–1 on aggregate and advanced to the fourth round.

=== Match 67 ===
March 8, 2017
19:30 UTC−03:00

Goiás	4–0	(Mato Grosso) Cuiabá
Tiago Luís 32'; Léo Gamalho 73', 82'; Patrick 75'	Report

Estádio Serra Dourada, Goiânia
Attendance: 5,750
Referee: Luiz César de Oliveira Magalhães (Ceará)

March 16, 2017
21:30 UTC−03:00

Cuiabá (Mato Grosso)	1–1	Goiás
Juba 26'	Report	Aylon 60'

Arena Pantanal, Cuiabá
Attendance: 1,092
Referee: Felipe Gomes da Silva (Paraná)

Goiás won 5–1 on aggregate and advanced to the fourth round.

=== Match 68 ===
March 9, 2017
19:15 UTC−03:00

Vasco da Gama (Rio de Janeiro (state))	1–1	(Bahia) Vitória
Nenê 90+3' (pen.)	Report	Patric 67'

Estádio São Januário, Rio de Janeiro
Attendance: 9,883
Referee: Elmo Alves Resende Cunha (Goiás)

March 16, 2017
19:30 UTC−03:00

Vitória (Bahia)	1–0	(Rio de Janeiro (state)) Vasco da Gama
Alan Costa 59'	Report

Barradão, Salvador
Attendance: 18,264
Referee: Dewson Fernando Freitas da Silva (Pará)

Vitória won 2–1 on aggregate and advanced to the fourth round.

=== Match 69 ===
March 16, 2017
21:30 UTC−03:00

ASA (Alagoas)	0–0	(Paraná (state)) Paraná
	Report

Estádio Municipal Coaracy da Mata Fonseca, Arapiraca
Attendance: 3,791
Referee: Emerson de Almeida Ferreira (Minas Gerais)

April 5, 2017
20:30 UTC−03:00

Paraná (Paraná (state))	0–0	(Alagoas) ASA
	Report
Penalties
Robson (penalty scored); Diego Tavares (penalty scored); Leandro Vilela (penalty scored); Eduardo Brock (penalty scored)	4–1	(penalty scored) Leandro Kível; (penalty missed) Airton; (penalty missed) Djalma

Estádio Vila Capanema, Curitiba
Attendance: 8,011
Referee: João Batista de Arruda (Rio de Janeiro)

Tied 0–0 on aggregate, Paraná won on penalties and advanced to the fourth round.

=== Match 70 ===
March 8, 2017
19:30 UTC−03:00

São Paulo (São Paulo (state))	3–1	(Rio Grande do Norte) ABC
Luiz Araújo 28', 50'; Pratto 56'	Report	Márcio Passos 53'

Estádio do Morumbi, São Paulo
Attendance: 15,101
Referee: Braulio da Silva Machado (Santa Catarina)

March 15, 2017
19:30 UTC−03:00

ABC (Rio Grande do Norte)	1–1	(São Paulo (state)) São Paulo
Márcio Passos 2'	Report	Cueva 38'

Frasqueirão, Natal
Attendance: 15,016
Referee: Wagner do Nascimento Magalhães (Rio de Janeiro)

São Paulo won 4–2 on aggregate and advanced to the fourth round.
