= Bruno Cosendey =

Brazilian footballer (born 1997)

Personal information
- Full name: Bruno Cosendey Lobo Pinto
- Date of birth: 25 January 1997 (age 29)
- Place of birth: Rio de Janeiro, Brazil
- Height: 1.85 m (6 ft 1 in)
- Position: Midfielder

Team information
- Current team: Vigor Lamezia
- Number: 9

Youth career
- 2007–2017: Vasco da Gama
- 2016: → Vitória de Guimarães (loan)

Senior career*
Years	Team	Apps	(Gls)
2016–2020	Vasco da Gama	16	(2)
2016	→ Vitória de Guimarães (B) (loan)	1	(0)
2019	→ Criciúma (loan)	9	(1)
2020	→ CRB (loan)	5	(1)
2021–2022	Santo André	2	(0)
2022	Hồ Chí Minh City	5	(0)
2023	Madureira	8	(0)
2023	Brasiliense	10	(6)
2023–2024	Rio Branco AC		
2024–2026	Mazzarrone Calcio		
2026–	Vigor Lamezia	0	(0)

International career
2015–2017	Brazil U20		
- * Club domestic league appearances and goals as of 17 February 2026

Bruno Cosendey Lobo Pinto (born 25 January 1997), commonly known as Bruno Cosendey, is a Brazilian professional footballer who plays as a midfielder for Vigor Lamezia.
