= Santiago Montoya =

Colombian footballer (born 1991)

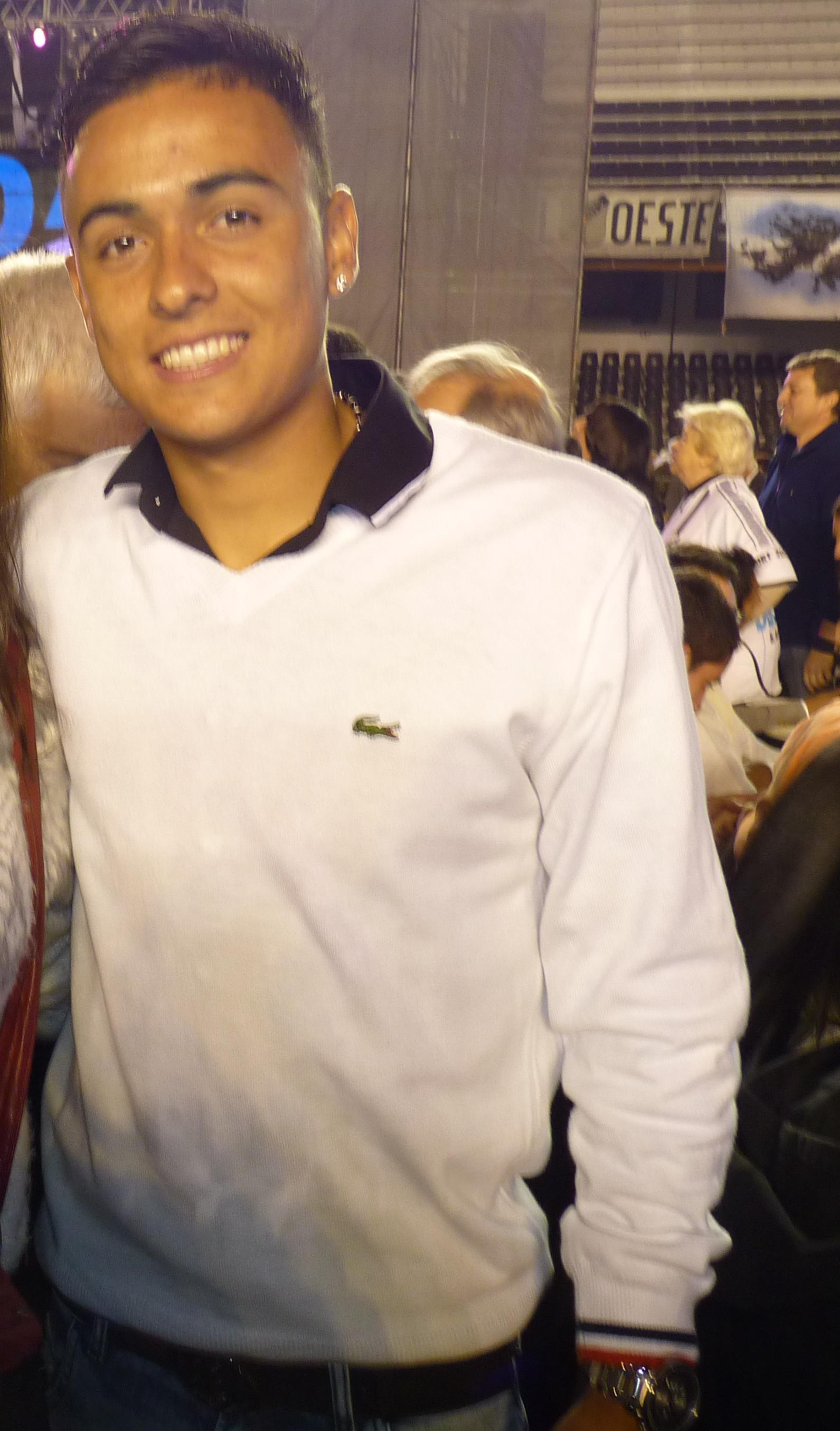
- Santiago Montoya in 2013

Personal information
- Full name: Santiago Montoya Muñoz
- Date of birth: September 15, 1991 (age 35)
- Place of birth: Medellín, Colombia
- Height: 1.73 m (5 ft 8 in)
- Positions: Attacking midfielder; winger

Team information
- Current team: Motagua
- Number: 24

Youth career
- 2005–2010: Atlético Nacional
- 2011–2012: All Boys

Senior career*
Years	Team	Apps	(Gls)
2012–2013	All Boys	25	(2)
2013–2017	Vasco da Gama	23	(1)
2015–2016	→ Vitória (loan)	7	(0)
2015–2016	→ Vitória B (loan)	11	(3)
2016–2017	→ Deportes Tolima (loan)	42	(10)
2018–2020	Millonarios	36	(2)
2021	Atlético Bucaramanga	30	(0)
2022	Deportivo Pereira	10	(1)
2023–	Motagua	0	(0)

International career^{‡}
2017	Colombia	1	(0)
- * Club domestic league appearances and goals as of 11 February 2023 ‡ National team caps and goals as of 25 January 2017

Santiago Montoya Muñoz (born 15 September 1991) is a Colombian footballer who plays for F.C. Motagua. He primarily plays as a left winger.

== Club career ==
=== Early career ===
Born in Medellín, Montoya is a product of the youth setup led by Atlético Nacional. Due to the high amount of competition there was at the Colombian club, Montoya decided to migrate to Argentina in search of new opportunities. Despite losing faith in playing for Nacional, Montoya regarded himself as a player with high potential. Eventually, that would lead him to try out for All Boys and finally sign with the club in 2011.

=== All Boys ===
Montoya made his debut for All Boys on 6 October 2012 in a game against San Martín for the 2012 Apertura tournament. He was substituted on in the second half for Francisco Martínez. He noticeably netted a goal from a free kick in the 2012–13 Copa Argentina match against Brown de Adrogué. On 3 March 2012, he scored his first goal in the aperatura in a 2-1 away loss against Tigre.

=== Vasco da Gama ===
In the month of June 2013, it was announced that Montoya had joined Vasco da Gama for a fee of $1.5 million.

== Honours ==
Vasco da Gama

- Campeonato Carioca: 2015
