= Gabriel Félix (footballer, born 1995) =

Brazilian footballer (born 1995)

Personal information
- Full name: Gabriel Félix dos Santos
- Date of birth: 4 April 1995 (age 31)
- Place of birth: Barra do Garças, Brazil
- Height: 1.90 m (6 ft 3 in)
- Position: Goalkeeper

Team information
- Current team: Manauara
- Number: 12

Youth career
- 2009–2011: Goiás
- 2011–2020: Vasco da Gama

Senior career*
Years	Team	Apps	(Gls)
2015–2020	Vasco da Gama	7	(0)
2018	→ Fortaleza (loan)	1	(0)
2019	→ São Bento (loan)	8	(0)
2020	→ Austin Bold (loan)	0	(0)
2020	→ União Cacoalense (loan)	1	(0)
2020–2021	Luverdense	17	(0)
2021	Camboriú	21	(0)
2022	→ São Luiz (loan)	16	(0)
2023	Velo Clube	6	(0)
2023	Campinense (loan)	0	(0)
2023	Velo Clube	20	(0)
2024–	Manauara	21	(0)
- * Club domestic league appearances and goals as of 21:05, 29 July 2025 (UTC)

Gabriel Félix dos Santos (born 4 April 1995) is a Brazilian footballer who plays as a goalkeeper for Manauara

== Career statistics ==
=== Club ===
As of 19 July 2019.

Club	Season	League			State League		Cup		Continental		Other		Total	
Club	Season	Division	Apps	Goals	Apps	Goals	Apps	Goals	Apps	Goals	Apps	Goals	Apps	Goals
Vasco da Gama	2015	Série A	0	0	0	0	0	0	–		0	0	0	0
Vasco da Gama	2016	Série A	0	0	0	0	0	0	–		0	0	0	0
Vasco da Gama	2017	Série A	3	0	0	0	0	0	–		0	0	3	0
Vasco da Gama	2018	Série A	0	0	4 (Note: Appearances in the Campeonato Carioca)	0	0	0	0	0	0	0	4	0
Vasco da Gama	2019	Série A	0	0	0	0	1 (Note: Appearances in the Copa do Brasil)	0	–		0	0	1	0
Vasco da Gama	Total		3	0	4	0	1	0	0	0	0	0	8	0
Fortaleza (loan)	2018	Série B	1	0	0	0	0	0	–		3 (Note: Appearances in the Copa Fares Lopes)	0	4	0
São Bento (loan)	2019	Série B	8	0	0	0	0	0	–		0	0	8	0
Career total			9	0	4	0	1	0	0	0	3	0	20	0
