= Madson (footballer, born 1992) =

Brazilian footballer

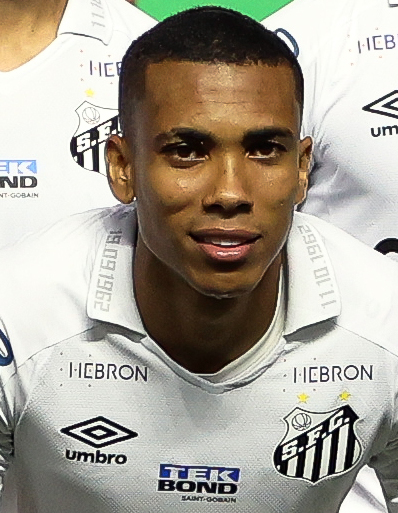
- Madson with Santos in 2022

Personal information
- Full name: Madson Ferreira dos Santos
- Date of birth: 13 January 1992 (age 34)
- Place of birth: Itaparica, Brazil
- Height: 1.82 m (6 ft 0 in)
- Position: Right back

Team information
- Current team: Novorizontino
- Number: 2

Youth career
- 2010–2011: Bahia

Senior career*
Years	Team	Apps	(Gls)
2011–2014	Bahia	52	(0)
2014	→ ABC (loan)	23	(1)
2015–2017	Vasco da Gama	116	(1)
2018–2019	Grêmio	17	(1)
2019	→ Athletico Paranaense (loan)	27	(5)
2020–2022	Santos	95	(12)
2023–2025	Athletico Paranaense	65	(2)
2026	Sport Recife	12	(1)
2026–	Novorizontino	16	(1)

International career
2011	Brazil U23	3	(0)
- * Club domestic league appearances and goals as of 17 November 2026

Madson Ferreira dos Santos (born 13 January 1992), simply known as Madson (Brazilian Portuguese: [ˈmadson]), is a Brazilian footballer who plays as a right back for Novorizontino.

== Club career ==
=== Bahia ===
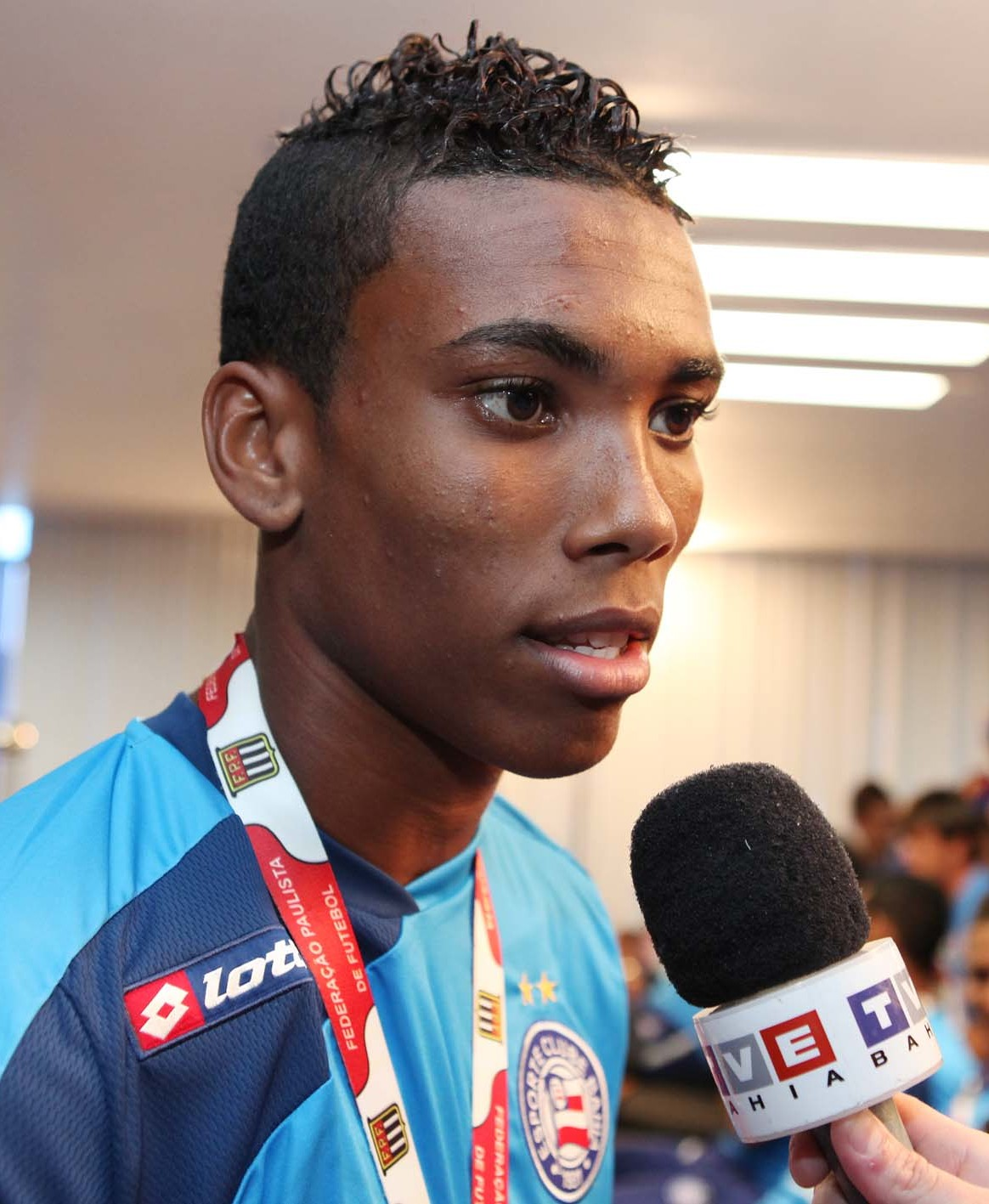
Madson with Bahia in 2011

Madson was born in Itaparica, Bahia, and joined Bahia's youth setup in 2010. He made his first team debut on 30 January of the following year, starting in a 2–1 Campeonato Baiano home loss against Fluminense de Feira.

Definitely promoted to the main squad for the 2012 season, Madson featured regularly for the club during the year's state league, and renewed his contract until 2015 on 2 May. However, he subsequently suffered an injury which kept him out for four months, and only made his Série A debut on 23 September by starting in a 3–1 loss at Internacional.

Regularly used in 2013, Madson lost space in the following season, and was loaned to Série B side ABC on 17 May 2014, until the end of the year. At the club he scored his first senior goal, netting the opener in a 2–1 home defeat of Vasco da Gama on 2 September.

=== Vasco da Gama ===
In January 2015, Madson agreed to a three-year deal with Vasco, after terminating his contract with Bahia. A regular starter at the club, he suffered relegation in his first season but achieved promotion in his second; in the meantime, he also extended his contract until 2019 in June 2016.

=== Grêmio ===
On 12 January 2018, Madson was announced at Grêmio after agreeing to a four-year contract. He was rarely used at his new club, being mainly a backup to veteran Léo Moura.

==== Athletico Paranaense (loan) ====
On 7 February 2019, Madson moved to fellow top-tier club Athletico Paranaense on a one-year loan deal. He then became a regular starter for the club, and scored his first goal in the main category on 21 July, netting the opener in a 4–0 away routing of CSA.

=== Santos ===
On 14 December 2019, Madson signed a three-year contract with Santos, with Victor Ferraz moving in the opposite direction. He made his debut for the club on 7 March, starting in a 3–1 Campeonato Paulista home defeat of Mirassol.

Madson scored his first goal for Peixe on 13 September 2020, netting his team's first in a 2–2 home draw against São Paulo. On 9 November, he and two other teammates tested positive for COVID-19. Despite being a regular starter for the most of his spell, he left on 22 November 2022, as Santos announced that his contract would not be renewed.

=== Athletico Paranaense return ===
On 7 January 2023, Madson returned to Athletico on a two-year contract.

== International career ==
In September 2011, Madson was called up to Brazil U23s by manager Ney Franco for the year's Pan American Games, appearing in all three matches as the nation suffered a group stage knockout.

== Career statistics ==
As of 6 November 2022

Club	Season	League			State League		Cup		Continental		Other		Total	
Club	Season	Division	Apps	Goals	Apps	Goals	Apps	Goals	Apps	Goals	Apps	Goals	Apps	Goals
Bahia	2011	Série A	0	0	1	0	0	0	—		—		1	0
Bahia	2012	Série A	1	0	14	0	6	0	0	0	—		21	0
Bahia	2013	Série A	28	0	2	0	1	0	3 (Note: Appearance(s) in Copa Sudamericana)	0	0	0	34	0
Bahia	2014	Série A	0	0	6	0	0	0	—		5 (Note: Appearance(s) in Copa do Nordeste)	0	11	0
Bahia	Total		29	0	23	0	7	0	3	0	5	0	67	0
ABC (loan)	2014	Série B	23	1	—		3	1	—		—		26	2
Vasco da Gama	2015	Série A	33	0	16	0	7	0	—		—		56	0
Vasco da Gama	2016	Série B	29	1	18	0	6	0	—		—		53	1
Vasco da Gama	2017	Série A	19	0	1	0	0	0	—		—		20	0
Vasco da Gama	Total		81	1	35	0	13	0	—		—		129	1
Grêmio	2018	Série A	8	0	9	1	2	0	3 (Note: Appearance(s) in Copa Libertadores)	0	—		22	1
Grêmio	2019	Série A	0	0	0	0	0	0	0	0	—		0	0
Grêmio	Total		8	0	9	1	2	0	3	0	—		22	1
Athletico Paranaense (loan)	2019	Série A	27	5	—		2	0	1	0	2 (Note: One appearance in Recopa Sudamericana, one appearance in J.League Cup / Copa Sudamericana Championship)	0	32	5
Santos	2020	Série A	26	5	3	0	2	0	8	0	—		39	5
Santos	2021	Série A	31	3	—		3	1	12 (Note: Eight appearances in Copa Libertadores, four appearances in Copa Sudamericana)	0	1 (Note: Appearance(s) in Copa Paulista)	1	47	5
Santos	2022	Série A	27	3	8	1	3	1	4	0	—		42	5
Santos	Total		84	11	11	1	8	2	24	0	1	1	128	15
Athletico Paranaense	2023	Série A	0	0	3	0	0	0	0	0	—		3	0
Career total			252	18	81	2	35	3	31	0	8	1	406	23

== Honours ==
Bahia

- Campeonato Baiano: 2012, 2014

Vasco da Gama

- Campeonato Carioca: 2015, 2016
- Taça Guanabara: 2016
- Taça Rio: 2017

Grêmio

- Campeonato Gaúcho: 2018

Athletico Paranaense

- J.League Cup / Copa Sudamericana Championship: 2019
- Campeonato Paranaense: 2023

Novorizontino

- Campeonato Brasileiro Série B: 2026
