= William Barbio =

Brazilian footballer

Personal information
- Full name: William Silva Gomes Barbio
- Date of birth: 22 October 1992
- Place of birth: Belford Roxo, Brazil
- Height: 1.73 m (5 ft 8 in)
- Position: Forward

Team information
- Current team: Amazonas FC
- Number: 20

Youth career
- 2005–2011: Nova Iguaçu

Senior career*
Years	Team	Apps	(Gls)
2011	Nova Iguaçu	0	(0)
2011–2017	Vasco da Gama	3	(0)
2013	→ Atlético Goianiense (loan)	3	(0)
2013–2014	→ Bahia (loan)	47	(3)
2015	→ Chapecoense (loan)	13	(0)
2016	→ América Mineiro (loan)	4	(0)
2016	→ Joinville (loan)	2	(0)
2017	→ Santa Cruz (loan)	17	(3)
2018	Boa Esporte	29	(5)
2019	CRB	15	(0)
2020	AD Confiança	0	(0)
2020	Bucheon FC	25	(3)
2021	Seoul E-Land	16	(1)
2023	Ypiranga	27	(7)
2023	Londrina	12	(1)
2024–	Amazonas	34	(5)
- * Club domestic league appearances and goals as of 18 December 2025

William Silva Gomes Barbio (born 22 October 1992), also known as William Barbio, is a Brazilian professional footballer who plays for Amazonas. Mainly used as a right winger, he can also play as an attacking midfielder or a centre-forward.

== Career statistics ==
(Correct as of 13 April 2015)

Club	Season	State League		League		Cup		Continental		Total	
Club	Season	Apps	Goals	Apps	Goals	Apps	Goals	Apps	Goals	Apps	Goals
Nova Iguaçu	2011	14	2	—						14	2
Vasco da Gama	2012	12	1	12	0	—		4	0	28	1
Vasco da Gama	2014	11	1	2	0	—		0	0	13	1
Vasco da Gama	Total	23	2	14	0	—		4	0	41	2
Atlético Goianiense (loan)	2013	15	4	3	0	2	1	—		20	5
Bahia (loan)	2013	—		22	3	—		2	0	24	3
Bahia (loan)	2014	—		25	0	3	0	2	1	29	1
Bahia (loan)	Total	—		47	3	3	0	4	1	53	4
Chapecoense (loan)	2015	18	1	0	0	0	0	—		18	1
Career Total		70	9	64	3	5	1	8	1	146	14
