= Thalles (footballer, born 1995) =

Brazilian footballer (1995–2019)

Personal information
- Full name: Thalles Lima de Conceição Penha
- Date of birth: 18 May 1995
- Place of birth: São Gonçalo, Brazil
- Date of death: 22 June 2019 (aged 24)
- Place of death: São Gonçalo, Brazil
- Height: 1.85 m (6 ft 1 in)
- Position: Striker

Youth career
- 2005–2007: Itaboraí Profute
- 2007–2013: Vasco da Gama

Senior career*
Years	Team	Apps	(Gls)
2013–2019	Vasco da Gama	157	(36)
2018	→ Albirex Niigata (loan)	41	(6)
2019	→ Ponte Preta (loan)	20	(5)

International career
2014–2015	Brazil U20	12	(5)
- * Club domestic league appearances and goals as of 10 March 2019

Thalles Lima de Conceição Penha (18 May 1995 – 22 June 2019), known simply as Thalles, was a Brazilian football player who played as an attacker mostly for Vasco da Gama.

Thalles died on 22 June 2019 in a motorcycle crash in São Gonçalo.

== Honours ==
=== Club ===
Vasco da Gama

- Campeonato Carioca: 2015
- Campeonato Carioca: 2016

=== International ===
Brazil U20

- Toulon Tournament: 2014
