= Índio (footballer, born 1996) =

Brazilian footballer

Matheus Índio
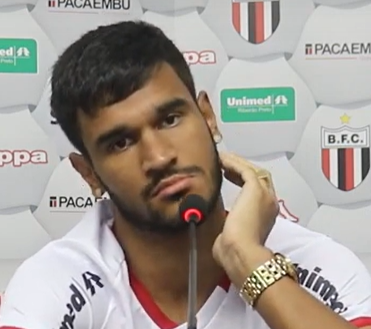
- Índio in 2020

Personal information
- Full name: Matheus da Cunha Gomes
- Date of birth: 28 February 1996 (age 30)
- Place of birth: Rio de Janeiro, Brazil
- Height: 1.79 m (5 ft 10 in)
- Position: Attacking midfielder

Team information
- Current team: Flamurtari
- Number: 11

Youth career
- 2008–2012: Vasco da Gama
- 2012: → Arsenal (loan)
- 2014: → Penapolense (loan)
- 2014: Santos

Senior career*
Years	Team	Apps	(Gls)
2014	Santos	0	(0)
2014	→ Penapolense (loan)	2	(0)
2015–2017	Vasco da Gama	6	(0)
2016–2017	→ Estoril (loan)	31	(4)
2017–2020	Estoril	23	(0)
2018–2019	→ Boavista (loan)	19	(1)
2020–2021	Botafogo-SP	5	(0)
2021–2022	Al-Nasr		
2023	Ipatinga	4	(0)
2023–	Flamurtari	6	(0)

International career
2010–2011	Brazil U15	2	(2)
2012–2013	Brazil U17	3	(0)
- * Club domestic league appearances and goals as of 22 November 2023

Matheus da Cunha Gomes (born 28 February 1996), commonly known as Matheus Índio, is a Brazilian footballer who plays as an attacking midfielder for Albanian club Flamurtari.
