= Jomar =

Brazilian footballer

Personal information
- Full name: Jomar Herculano Lourenço
- Date of birth: September 28, 1992 (age 34)
- Place of birth: Rio de Janeiro, Brazil
- Height: 1.85 m (6 ft 1 in)
- Position: Center back

Team information
- Current team: Retrô

Youth career
- 2009–2010: Tigres do Brasil
- 2011: Vasco da Gama

Senior career*
Years	Team	Apps	(Gls)
2011–2019	Vasco da Gama	65	(1)
2012	→ Rio Branco-SP (loan)	5	(0)
2018	→ Oeste (loan)	2	(0)
2019	→ Oriente Petrolero (loan)	0	(0)
2020	Iporá	8	(0)
2021	Treze	0	(0)
2021	Fluminense-PI	4	(0)
2021	Retrô	1	(0)
- * Club domestic league appearances and goals as of 19 September 2021

Jomar Herculano Lourenço (born 28 September 1992), commonly known as Jomar, is a Brazilian footballer who plays as a center back.

== Club career ==
Jomar joined the youth training centre of Vasco da Gama in 2011 and was promoted to the senior side the same year. He made his senior debut on 29 May 2011, in a Campeonato Brasileiro Série A game between Vasco and América-MG. During his nine years at the club he had threeloan spells away: the first at Rio Branco-SP in the first few months of 2013, and the second with Oeste Futebol Clube in the second half of 2018. At the start of 2019 he joined Bolivian side Oriente Petrolero on loan, but an injury prevented him from making any appearances and the loan was terminated early in May.

At the start of 2020, Jomar signed with Iporá, where he played eight games in the Campeonato Goiano, before the season was paused indefinitely in March, with Iporá releasing their whole squad.

On 24 February 2021, Jomar signed for Treze. He was not registered on the BID (Brazilian football player database) by the club, and the next month he joined Fluminense-PI.
