= Júlio César (footballer, born 1982) =

Brazilian footballer

Personal information
- Full name: Júlio César Coelho de Moraes Júnior
- Date of birth: 15 June 1982 (age 44)
- Place of birth: São Paulo, Brazil
- Height: 1.73 m (5 ft 8 in)
- Position: Defender

Team information
- Current team: America-RJ (assistant)

Youth career
- 2001: Bangu

Senior career*
Years	Team	Apps	(Gls)
2002	Bangu	7	(0)
2003	América-RN	12	(1)
2003–2005	Flamengo	12	(0)
2005	Marília	3	(0)
2006–2009	Cruzeiro	16	(0)
2007	→ Cabofriense (loan)	0	(0)
2007	→ Náutico (loan)	26	(5)
2008–2009	→ Goiás (loan)	64	(9)
2010–2012	Fluminense	30	(1)
2011–2012	→ Grêmio (loan)	21	(0)
2013–2014	Botafogo	48	(1)
2015–2017	Vasco da Gama	56	(2)
2017	→ Boavista (loan)	1	(0)
2018	Boavista	0	(0)

Managerial career
- 2019: Boavista
- 2024–: America-RJ (assistant)
- 2024: America-RJ (interim)
- * Club domestic league appearances and goals

Júlio César Coelho de Moraes Júnior (born 15 June 1982 in São Paulo), best known as Júlio César, is a Brazilian football coach and former player who played as a defender. He is the current assistant coach of America-RJ.

Júlio César joined Fluminense in December 2009; the team bought him from Cruzeiro (50%) and Goiás.

== Honours ==
=== Club ===
Flamengo

- Taça Guanabara: 2004
- Rio de Janeiro State League: 2004

Cruzeiro

- Minas Gerais State League: 2006

Goiás

- Goiás State League: 2009

Fluminense

- Campeonato Brasileiro Série A: 2010

Botafogo

- Campeonato Carioca: 2013

Vasco da Gama

- Campeonato Carioca: 2016

=== Individual ===
- Campeonato Brasileiro Série A Team of the Year: 2009
