= William Oliveira (footballer, born 1992) =

Brazilian footballer

Personal information
- Full name: William Oliveira dos Santos
- Date of birth: 25 February 1992 (age 34)
- Place of birth: Paracambi, Brazil
- Height: 1.82 m (5 ft 11 1/2 in)
- Position: Centre midfielder

Team information
- Current team: Boavista

Youth career
- Lageense
- Boavista
- Artsul

Senior career*
Years	Team	Apps	(Gls)
2013	São Mateus	7	(0)
2014	São Gonçalo EC	1	(0)
2014	São Mateus	6	(0)
2015	Sport Capixaba	11	(0)
2015	Doze	7	(0)
2016–2018	Madureira	32	(2)
2016	→ Vasco da Gama (loan)	20	(0)
2017	→ Bangu (loan)	6	(0)
2018	→ Sampaio Corrêa (loan)	32	(0)
2019–2023	Ceará	43	(1)
2022	→ Sport Recife (loan)	22	(0)
2023	CSA	4	(0)
2024–	Boavista	0	(0)
- * Club domestic league appearances and goals as of 20 May 2023

William Oliveira dos Santos (born 25 February 1992), known as William Oliveira, is a Brazilian footballer who plays for Boavista as a centre midfielder.

== Career statistics ==
As of 25 October 2021

Club	Season	League			State League		Cup		Continental		Other		Total	
Club	Season	Division	Apps	Goals	Apps	Goals	Apps	Goals	Apps	Goals	Apps	Goals	Apps	Goals
São Mateus	2013	Capixaba	—		7	0	—		—		—		7	0
São Gonçalo EC	2014	Carioca Série B	—		1	0	—		—		—		1	0
São Mateus	2014	Capixaba	—		—		—		—		6 (Note: All appearance(s) in Copa Espírito Santo)	0	6	0
Sport Capixaba	2015	Capixaba	—		11	0	—		—		—		11	0
Doze	2015	Capixaba Série B	—		—		—		—		7	0	7	0
Madureira	2016	Série D	0	0	12	0	—		—		—		12	0
Madureira	2017	Carioca	—		7	1	—		—		2 (Note: All appearance(s) in Copa Rio)	0	9	1
Madureira	2018	Série D	0	0	10	1	1	0	—		—		11	1
Madureira	Subtotal		0	0	29	2	1	0	—		2	0	32	2
Vasco da Gama	2016	Série B	18	0	—		2	0	—		—		20	0
Bangu	2017	Série D	6	0	—		—		—		—		6	0
Sampaio Corrêa	2018	Série B	24	0	—		—		—		8 (Note: All appearance(s) in Copa do Nordeste)	0	32	0
Ceará	2019	Série A	14	0	4	1	0	0	—		1	0	19	1
Ceará	2020	Série A	11	0	0	0	4	0	—		7	0	22	0
Ceará	2021	Série A	7	0	0	0	0	0	—		4	0	11	0
Ceará	Subtotal		32	0	4	1	4	0	—		12	0	52	1
Career total			80	0	52	3	7	0	0	0	35	0	174	3

== Honours ==
Ceará

- Copa do Nordeste: 2020
