= Bruno Ferreira (footballer, born September 1994) =

Brazilian footballer

Personal information
- Full name: Bruno Ferreira dos Santos
- Date of birth: 14 September 1994 (age 32)
- Place of birth: São Paulo, Brazil
- Height: 1.80 m (5 ft 11 in)
- Position: Right back

Team information
- Current team: Treze

Youth career
- Portuguesa

Senior career*
| Years | Team | Apps | (Gls) |
| 2014 | Portuguesa | 6 | (1) |
| 2015–2018 | Vasco da Gama | 4 | (0) |
| 2015 | → Bragantino (loan) | 4 | (0) |
| 2016–2017 | → Red Bull Brasil (loan) | 3 | (0) |
| 2019 | Tombense | 14 | (0) |
| 2020–2022 | Aimoré | 44 | (2) |
| 2022 | São José-RS | 9 | (0) |
| 2023 | Aimoré | 9 | (0) |
| 2023 | → Andraus (loan) | 7 | (0) |
| 2024– | Treze | 0 | (0) |
- * Club domestic league appearances and goals as of 12:20, 16 January 2024 (UTC)

Bruno Ferreira dos Santos (born 14 September 1994), known as Bruno Ferreira or simply Bruno, is a Brazilian footballer who plays for Treze as a right back.

== Career ==
Born in São Paulo, Bruno Ferreira graduated from Portuguesa's youth system. On 28 October 2014 he made his professional debut, starting in a 0–3 away loss against Oeste, with his side being relegated to Série C for the first time ever.

On 8 November, again as a starter, Bruno Ferreira provided the assist for Luan's only goal in a 1–0 home success over Luverdense. Late in the month he scored his first professional goal, netting the first of a 2–3 home loss against Vila Nova.

On 23 December Bruno Ferreira moved to Vasco da Gama, newly promoted to Série A. On 6 February 2015, he was loaned to Bragantino until May.
