= Lorran (footballer, born 1996) =

Brazilian footballer

Personal information
- Full name: Lorran de Oliveira Quintanilha
- Date of birth: 8 January 1996 (age 30)
- Place of birth: Armação dos Búzios, Brazil
- Height: 1.63 m (5 ft 4 in)
- Position: Left-back

Team information
- Current team: Dinamo Tirana
- Number: 47

Youth career
- –2014: Vasco da Gama

Senior career*
Years	Team	Apps	(Gls)
2014–2017	Vasco da Gama	13	(0)
2017	→ Moto Club (loan)	16	(1)
2018	Santo André	0	(0)
2018	Pafos	8	(0)
2019	Serra Macaense	7	(0)
2020–2021	Imperatriz	10	(0)
2021–2023	Bylis	83	(3)
2023–	Dinamo Tirana	96	(2)

International career
2013	Brazil U17		
2014–2015	Brazil U20	2	(0)
- * Club domestic league appearances and goals as of 25 June 2026

Lorran de Oliveira Quintanilha (born 8 January 1996), commonly known as Lorran, is a Brazilian footballer who plays as a left-back for Dinamo Tirana.

== Career ==
Lorran is a product of CR Vasco da Gama's youth academy, and he appeared in 18 competitive matches for the club. In 2015, Italian club Torino was interested in a transfer, but Lorran suffered a serious knee injury which scrapped the deal.

== Honours ==
Dinamo Tirana

- Kupa e Shqipërisë: 2024–25
