= Bruno Gallo =

Brazilian footballer (born 1988)

Personal information
- Full name: Bruno Vieira Gallo de Oliveira
- Date of birth: May 7, 1988 (age 38)
- Place of birth: Niterói, Rio de Janeiro, Brazil
- Height: 1.82 m (6 ft 0 in)
- Position: Central midfielder

Team information
- Current team: Niteroiense
- Number: 13

Youth career
- –2007: Vasco da Gama

Senior career*
Years	Team	Apps	(Gls)
2008–2010	Vasco da Gama	13	(0)
2007	→ Bréscia (loan)	0	(0)
2009–2010	→ Leixões (loan)	12	(0)
2010–2013	Vitória de Setúbal	43	(0)
2013–2014	Resende	12	(1)
2014–2015	Marítimo	25	(4)
2015	Marítimo B	1	(1)
2015–2017	Vasco da Gama	20	(0)
2017–2018	Qatar SC	22	(4)
2018–2019	Chaves	30	(3)
2019	Muangthong United	15	(1)
2021	Palestino	2	(0)
2022	Volta Redonda	30	(1)
2023	Zinza	20	(3)
2024-	Niteroiense	35	(11)
- * Club domestic league appearances and goals as of 8 November 2025

Bruno Vieira Gallo de Oliveira (born 7 May 1988), or simply Bruno Gallo, is a Brazilian footballer who plays as a central midfielder for Niteroiense.
