= Rafael Marques (footballer, born September 1983) =

Brazilian footballer

Personal information
- Full name: Rafael Marques Pinto
- Date of birth: 21 September 1983 (age 43)
- Place of birth: Rio de Janeiro, Brazil
- Height: 1.83 m (6 ft 0 in)
- Position: Centre back

Youth career
- 2001–2002: Botafogo

Senior career*
Years	Team	Apps	(Gls)
2003	Brasiliense	31	(9)
2004–2007	Botafogo	78	(7)
2008	Goiás	24	(1)
2009–2011	Grêmio	85	(9)
2012–2013	Atlético Mineiro	25	(2)
2013–2015	Hellas Verona	35	(0)
2015–2016	Coritiba	17	(1)
2016–2018	Vasco da Gama	34	(1)
2019	Boavista	6	(0)
- * Club domestic league appearances and goals

Rafael Marques Pinto (born 21 September 1983), most commonly known as Rafael Marques, is a Brazilian former footballer.

== Honours ==
Botafogo

- Copa Rio: 2007

Grêmio

- Campeonato Gaúcho: 2010

Atlético Mineiro

- Campeonato Mineiro: 2012, 2013
- Copa Libertadores: 2013
