= Caio Monteiro =

Brazilian footballer (born 1997)

Personal information
- Full name: Caio Monteiro Costa
- Date of birth: 10 February 1997 (age 29)
- Place of birth: Rio de Janeiro, Brazil
- Height: 1.77 m (5 ft 10 in)
- Position: Forward

Team information
- Current team: Friburguense Atlético Clube
- Number: 11

Youth career
- 2005–2017: Vasco da Gama

Senior career*
| Years | Team | Apps | (Gls) |
| 2016–2021 | Vasco da Gama | 24 | (4) |
| 2019 | → Paraná (loan) | 6 | (0) |
| 2020 | → Boavista (loan) | 0 | (0) |
| 2020–2021 | → Novorizontino (loan) | 18 | (3) |
| 2021 | Joinville | 17 | (2) |
| 2022 | Grêmio Anápolis | 4 | (0) |
| 2023– | Friburguense AC | 5 | (2) |

International career
| 2015–2017 | Brazil U20 | | |
- * Club domestic league appearances and goals as of 03 January 2020 (UTC)

Caio Monteiro Costa (born 10 February 1997), commonly known as Caio Monteiro, is a Brazilian footballer who plays as a forward for Nova Venécia.
