= Guilherme Costa (footballer) =

Brazilian footballer (born 1994)

Personal information
- Full name: Guilherme Costa Machado Silveira
- Date of birth: 31 March 1994 (age 32)
- Place of birth: Rio de Janeiro, Brazil
- Height: 1.78 m (5 ft 10 in)
- Positions: Attacking midfielder; winger

Youth career
- 2006–2014: Vasco da Gama

Senior career*
Years	Team	Apps	(Gls)
2012–2021	Vasco da Gama	24	(2)
2015	→ Bragantino (loan)	5	(0)
2016	→ Boavista (loan)	13	(2)
2018	→ Vitória (loan)	16	(1)
2019	→ CRB (loan)	6	(0)
2020	→ Boavista (loan)	3	(0)

International career
2008–2009	Brazil U15		
2010–2011	Brazil U17		
- * Club domestic league appearances and goals as of 02 January 2019 (UTC)

Guilherme Costa Machado Silveira (born 31 March 1994), commonly known as Guilherme Costa or Guilherme, is a Brazilian footballer who plays as an attacking midfielder.
