= 2018 CR Vasco da Gama season =

Vasco da Gama
2018 season
- President: Alexandre Campello since 22 January (Julio Brant, Eurico Miranda, Fernando Horta on triumvirate since 17 January until 21 January) (Eurico Miranda until 16 January)
- Head Coach: Zé Ricardo
- Stadium: São Januário
- Brasileirão Série A: 16th
- Copa do Brasil: Round of 16
- Campeonato do Estado do Rio de Janeiro: Runners-up; Taça Guanabara: Group stage Taça Rio de Janeiro: Semifinal
- Copa Libertadores: Group stage
- Copa Sudamericana: Second qualifying stage
Home colours	Away colours

The 2018 season is Club de Regatas Vasco da Gama's 120th complete calendar year in existence, the club's 103rd season in existence of football, and the club's 45th season playing in the Brasileirão Série A, the top flight of Brazilian football.

== Players ==
=== Squad information ===
As of 9 March 2018.

No.	Name	Nationality	Position (s)	Date of birth (age)	Signed from
Goalkeepers
1	Martín Silva	(Uruguay)	GK	25 March 1983 (aged 35)	(Paraguay) Olimpia
12	Gabriel Félix	(Brazil)	GK	4 April 1995 (aged 23)	Youth system
24	João Pedro (youth player)	(Brazil)	GK	28 January 1998 (aged 20)	Youth system
33	Fernando Miguel	(Brazil)	GK	2 February 1985 (aged 33)	(Brazil) Vitória
44	Jordi	(Brazil)	GK	3 September 1993 (aged 25)	(Iran) Tractor Sazi (loaned from Vasco da Gama)
Defenders
2	Rafael Galhardo	(Brazil)	RFB	30 October 1991 (aged 27)	(Brazil) Cruzeiro
3	Frickson Erazo (on loan from Atlético Mineiro)	(Ecuador)	CB	5 May 1988 (aged 30)	(Brazil) Atlético Mineiro
4	Breno	(Brazil)	CB, DM	13 October 1989 (aged 29)	(Brazil) Vasco da Gama (loaned from São Paulo)
6	Fabrício (on loan from Cruzeiro)	(Brazil)	LFB	11 January 1987 (aged 31)	(Brazil) Atlético Paranaense (loaned from Cruzeiro)
13	Luiz Gustavo	(Brazil)	CB, RFB	12 February 1994 (aged 24)	(Brazil) Oeste (loaned from Palmeiras)
14	Ricardo Graça	(Brazil)	CB, LFB	19 February 1997 (aged 21)	Youth system
16	Henrique	(Brazil)	LFB, LWM	25 April 1994 (aged 24)	Youth system
22	Yago Pikachu	(Brazil)	RFB, RWM	5 June 1992 (aged 26)	(Brazil) Paysandu
25	Paulão (on loan from Internacional)	(Brazil)	CB	25 February 1986 (aged 32)	(Brazil) Internacional
27	Ramon	(Brazil)	LFB	6 May 1988 (aged 30)	(Turkey) Antalyaspor
29	Bruno Silva	(Brazil)	CB, DM	15 February 1988 (aged 30)	(Brazil) Ferroviária
34	Werley	(Brazil)	CB, RFB	5 September 1988 (aged 30)	(Brazil) Coritiba
Midfielders
5	Leandro Desábato	(Argentina)	DM, CB	30 March 1990 (aged 28)	(Argentina) Vélez Sarsfield
7	Wellington	(Brazil)	DM, RWM, AM	28 January 1991 (aged 27)	(Brazil) Vasco da Gama (loaned from São Paulo)
8	Thiago Galhardo	(Brazil)	AM, RWM	20 July 1989 (aged 29)	(Japan) Albirex Niigata (loaned from Coritiba)
10	Evander (youth player)	(Brazil)	AM, DM, LWM, RWM	9 June 1998 (aged 20)	Youth system
15	Andrey (youth player)	(Brazil)	DM, RFB	15 February 1998 (aged 20)	Youth system
20	Wágner	(Brazil)	AM, LWM, RWM, DM	29 January 1985 (aged 33)	(China) Tianjin TEDA
23	Bruno Paulista (on loan from Sporting de Portugal)	(Brazil)	DM	21 August 1995 (aged 23)	Sporting de Portugal
26	Giovanni Augusto (on loan from Corinthians)	(Brazil)	AM, RWM, LWM	5 September 1989 (aged 29)	(Brazil) Corinthians
32	Bruno Cosendey	(Brazil)	DM, AM	25 January 1997 (aged 21)	Youth system
Forwards
9	Andrés Ríos	(Argentina)	CF, RWM, AM	1 August 1989 (aged 29)	(Argentina) Defensa y Justicia
11	Paulinho (youth player)	(Brazil)	LWM, RWM, AM, CF	15 July 2000 (aged 18)	Youth system
17	Rildo	(Brazil)	LWM, RWM	20 March 1989 (aged 29)	(Brazil) Coritiba
18	Duvier Riascos	(Colombia)	CF, RWM, LWM	26 June 1986 (aged 32)	(Colombia) Millonarios
19	Caio Monteiro	(Brazil)	LWM, CF, RWM	10 February 1997 (aged 21)	Youth system
21	Paulo Vitor (youth player)	(Brazil)	CF, RWM, LWM	24 June 1999 (aged 19)	Youth system
28	Kelvin (on loan from Porto)	(Brazil)	RWM, LWM	1 June 1993 (aged 25)	(Brazil) São Paulo (loaned from Porto)

==== from Vasco da Gama (B) (reserve team) ====
As of 18 December 2017.

No.	Name	Nationality	Position (s)	Date of birth (age)	Signed from
Defenders
	Jomar	(Brazil)	CB	28 September 1992 (aged 26)	(Brazil) Vasco da Gama
	Kadu	(Brazil)	CB	2 March 1995 (aged 23)	(Brazil) Boavista (loaned from Vasco da Gama)
Midfielders
	Lucas (on loan from Boavista)	(Brazil)	LWM, RWM, AM	1 April 1996 (aged 22)	(Brazil) Boavista
	Marcelo Mattos	(Brazil)	DM	10 February 1984 (aged 34)	(Brazil) Vasco da Gama
Forwards
	Bruno Henricky	(Brazil)	RWM	17 August 1997 (aged 21)	(Brazil) Tigres do Brasil – (U–20) (loaned from Vasco da Gama – (U–20))

==== Out on loan ====
No.	Name	Nationality	Position (s)	Date of birth (age)	Signed from
Defenders
	Alan (youth player, on loan to ABC)	(Brazil)	LFB, LWM	5 January 1998 (aged 20)	(Brazil) Vasco da Gama
Midfielders
	Guilherme (on loan to Vitória)	(Brazil)	LWM, AM, RWM	31 March 1994 (aged 24)	(Brazil) Vasco da Gama
Forwards
	Thalles (on loan to Albirex Niigata)	(Brazil)	CF	18 May 1995 (aged 23)	(Brazil) Vasco da Gama

=== Transfers ===
==== In ====
Date	Player	Number	Position	Previous club	Fee/notes	Ref
17 December 2017	(Argentina) Leandro Luis Desábato		MF	(Argentina) Vélez Sarsfield		Vasco.com.br
21 December 2017	(Brazil) Rildo		FW	(Brazil) Coritiba		Vasco.com.br
27 December 2017	(Brazil) Breno		DF	(Brazil) Vasco da Gama (loaned from São Paulo)		
30 December 2017	(Brazil) Wellington		MF	(Brazil) Vasco da Gama (loaned from São Paulo)		
5 January 2018	(Brazil) Thiago Galhardo		MF	(Japan) Albirex Niigata (loaned from Coritiba)		Vasco.com.br
6 January 2018	(Brazil) Luiz Gustavo		DF	(Brazil) Oeste (loaned from Palmeiras)		Vasco.com.br
12 January 2018	(Colombia) Duvier Riascos		FW	(Colombia) Millonarios		Vasco.com.br
13 January 2018	(Brazil) Rafael Galhardo		DF	(Brazil) Cruzeiro		Vasco.com.br
25 January 2018	(Brazil) Werley		DF	(Brazil) Coritiba		Vasco.com.br
9 March 2018	(Brazil) Bruno		DF	(Brazil) Ferroviária		Vasco.com.br
8 May 2018	(Brazil) Fernando Miguel		GK	(Brazil) Vitória		Vasco.com.br

===== Loan in =====
Date from	Date to	Player	Number	Position	Previous club	Fee/notes	Ref
3 February 2017	31 December 2018	(Brazil) Kelvin		FW	(Brazil) São Paulo (loaned from Porto)	Loan transfer from Porto; Previously end of loan: 31 December 2017	
30 June 2017	30 June 2018	(Brazil) Bruno Paulista		MF	Sporting de Portugal	Loan transfer from Sporting de Portugal	Vasco.com.br
13 January 2018	31 December 2018	(Ecuador) Frickson Erazo		DF	(Brazil) Atlético Mineiro	Loan transfer from Atlético Mineiro	Vasco.com.br
15 January 2018	31 December 2018	(Brazil) Fabrício		DF	(Brazil) Atlético Paranaense (loaned from Cruzeiro)	Loan transfer from Cruzeiro	Vasco.com.br
26 January 2018	31 December 2019	(Brazil) Paulão		DF	(Brazil) Internacional	Loan transfer from Internacional	
8 February 2018	31 December 2018	(Brazil) Giovanni Augusto		MF	(Brazil) Corinthians	Loan transfer from Corinthians	Vasco.com.br
29 March 2018	31 December 2018	(Brazil) Lucas		MF	(Brazil) Boavista	Loan transfer from Boavista	Vasco.com.br

===== On trial (in) =====
Date from	Date to	Player	Number	Position	Previous club	Fee/notes	Ref
1 July 2017	5 March 2018	(Brazil) Bruno Ferreira		MF	(Brazil) Red Bull Brasil (loaned from Vasco da Gama)	Vasco da Gama – (B)	
21 November 2017		(Brazil) Daniel Pessoa		FW	Free agent (last club: (Brazil) Santa Rita (loaned from Marília))	Vasco da Gama – (B)	
29 November 2017		(Brazil) Nathan		FW	(Brazil) Duque de Caxias	Vasco da Gama – (B); Loan from Duque de Caxias	
12 December 2017	March 2018	(Brazil) Wellington Lucas		DF	(Brazil) Brasilis	Vasco da Gama – (B)	
12 December 2017	March 2018	(Brazil) Jeferson		MF	(Brazil) São Gonçalo	Vasco da Gama – (B); Loan from São Gonçalo	
12 December 2017	March 2018	(Brazil) Diogo		FW	(Brazil) Elosport Capão Bonito	Vasco da Gama – (B)	
12 December 2017	March 2018	(Brazil) Eduardo Melo		MF	Free agent (last club: (Brazil) Baraúnas (loaned from Vasco da Gama))	Vasco da Gama – (B)	
12 December 2017	17 January 2018	(Brazil) Rogélio Balotelli		FW	(Brazil) América (Teófilo Otoni)	Vasco da Gama – (B)	
12 December 2017	26 February 2018	(Brazil) Jonathan Bryan		FW	(Brazil) Barra Mansa	Vasco da Gama – (B)	
15 December 2017	March 2018	(Brazil) Daniel Felipe		DF	(Brazil) São Gonçalo	Vasco da Gama – (B); Loan from São Gonçalo	
15 December 2017	March 2018	(Brazil) Joseph		MF	(Brazil) São Gonçalo	Vasco da Gama – (B); Loan from São Gonçalo	
17 December 2017	March 2018	(Brazil) Alex de Souza		MF	(Brazil) Penapolense	Vasco da Gama – (B)	
17 December 2017		(Brazil) Gleison		DF	Free agent (last club: (Brazil) Santos – (U-20))	Vasco da Gama – (B)	
20 December 2017	March 2018	(Brazil) Enric Ferro		DF	(Brazil) America (RJ)	Vasco da Gama – (B)	
20 December 2017	March 2018	(Brazil) Yuri		DF	(Brazil) Barra da Tijuca	Vasco da Gama – (B)	
20 December 2017	15 February 2018	(Brazil) Mayron		MF	(Brazil) Audax Rio de Janeiro	Vasco da Gama – (B)	
20 December 2017		(Brazil) Willian		MF	(Brazil) Barra Mansa	Vasco da Gama – (B); Loan from Barra Mansa	
20 December 2017	March 2018	(Brazil) Romário		MF	(Brazil) Carapebus	Vasco da Gama – (B); Loan from Carapebus	
21 December 2017		(Brazil) Thiago Moraes		GK	(Brazil) América (Teófilo Otoni)	Vasco da Gama – (B)	
22 December 2017		(Brazil) Renan Mello		MF	(Brazil) América (MG)	Vasco da Gama – (B)	
28 December 2017		(Brazil) Jomar		DF	(Brazil) Vasco da Gama	Vasco da Gama – (B)	
28 December 2017	18 January 2018	(Brazil) Thalles		FW	(Brazil) Vasco da Gama	Vasco da Gama – (B)	
13 January 2018		(Brazil) Matheus Cabral		GK	(Brazil) São Cristóvão (loaned from Vasco da Gama – (U–20))	Vasco da Gama – (B)	
		(Brazil) Bruno Henricky		FW	(Brazil) Tigres do Brasil – (U–20) (loaned from Vasco da Gama – (U–20))	Vasco da Gama – (B)	
9 April 2018		(Brazil) Kadu		DF	(Brazil) Boavista (loaned from Vasco da Gama)	Vasco da Gama – (B)	
11 April 2018		(Brazil) Marcelo Mattos		MF	(Brazil) Vasco da Gama	Vasco da Gama – (B)	
11 May 2018		(Brazil) Lucas		MF	(Brazil) Vasco da Gama (loaned from Boavista)	Vasco da Gama – (B)	

==== Out ====
Date	Player	Number	Position	Destination club	Fee/notes	Ref
4 December 2017; 4 January 2018	(Brazil) Éder Luís		FW	(Brazil) Red Bull Brasil		RedBullBrasil.com.br
7 December 2017; 15 December 2017	(Brazil) Lorran		DF	(Brazil) Santo André	Previously on Moto Club de São Luís on loan from Vasco da Gama	
7 December 2017; 14 March 2018	(Brazil) William Barbio		FW	(Brazil) Boa	Previously on Santa Cruz on loan from Vasco da Gama	
12 December 2017	(Brazil) Júlio César		DF	(Brazil) Boavista	Previously on Boavista on loan from Vasco da Gama	
28 December 2017	(Brazil) Rafael Marques		DF			
9 January 2018; 10 January 2018	(Brazil) Anderson Martins		DF	(Brazil) São Paulo	Rescission of contract, R$ 10 million buyout clause on a hypothetical transfer to Flamengo	SaoPauloFC.net
12 January 2018	(Brazil) Mádson		DF	(Brazil) Grêmio	R$ 2 million (60% of federal rights)	Gremio.net
12 January 2018; 16 January 2018	(Brazil) Jussa		MF	(Brazil) São Bernardo	Previously on Vasco da Gama – (B)	
16 January 2018	(Brazil) Mateus Vital		MF	(Brazil) Corinthians	R$ 8 million (50% of federal rights)	Corinthians.com.br
16 January 2018; 2 February 2018	(Brazil) Andrezinho		MF	(Brazil) Nova Iguaçu	Rescission of contract due to lack of payments Previously on Goiás on loan from Vasco da Gama	NIFC.com.br
26 January 2018; 29 January 2018	(Brazil) Nenê		FW	(Brazil) São Paulo		SãoPauloFC.net
29 January 2018	(Argentina) Damián Escudero		MF		Rescission of contract due to lack of payments	
8 February 2018	(Brazil) Luís Fabiano		FW		Rescission of contract	Vasco.com.br
5 March 2018	(Brazil) Bruno Ferreira		DF		Previously on Vasco da Gama – (B)	
9 April 2018	(Brazil) Renato Kayser		FW	(Brazil) Atlético Goianiense (loaned from Cruzeiro)	Previously on Tupi on loan from Vasco da Gama	
26 April 2018; 15 July 2018	(Brazil) Paulinho		FW	(Germany) Bayer Leverkusen	€ 20 million	Bayer04.de

===== Loan out =====
Date from	Date to	Player	Number	Position	Destination club	Fee/notes	Ref
17 May 2017	9 April 2018	(Brazil) Kadu		DF	(Brazil) Boavista	Previously end of loan: 31 December 2017; Previously end of loan: 30 June 2018	
4 December 2017	2 May 2018	(Brazil) Jordi		GK	(Iran) Tractor Sazi	Previously end of loan: 30 June 2018	
5 December 2017	9 April 2018	(Brazil) Renato Kayser		FW	(Brazil) Tupi	Previously on Ferroviária on loan from Vasco da Gama; Previously end of loan: 30 June 2018	
19 January 2018	31 December 2018	(Brazil) Thalles		FW	(Japan) Albirex Niigata		Albirex.co.jp
8 February 2018	31 December 2018	(Brazil) Guilherme		MF	(Brazil) Vitória		ECVitoria.com.br
26 April 2018	31 December 2018	(Brazil) Alan		DF	(Brazil) ABC		ABCFC.com.br

== Competitions ==
Times from 1 January to 17 February 2018 and from 4 November to 31 December 2018 are UTC–2, from 17 February 2018 to 3 November 2018 UTC–3.

=== Brasileirão Série A ===
==== League table ====
Pos	Team	Pld	W	D	L	GF	GA	GD	Pts	Qualification or relegation
14	Chapecoense	38	11	11	16	34	50	−16	44	Qualification for Copa Sudamericana first stage
15	Ceará	38	10	14	14	32	38	−6	44	
16	Vasco da Gama	38	10	13	15	41	48	−7	43	
17	América Mineiro (R)	38	10	10	18	30	47	−17	40	Relegation to Campeonato Brasileiro Série B
18	Sport (Note: Sport were deducted three points for the late payment of salary of player Gabriel.) (R)	38	11	9	18	35	57	−22	39	Relegation to Campeonato Brasileiro Série B

Source: CBF
Rules for classification: 1) points; 2) wins; 3) goal difference; 4) goals scored; 5) head-to-head results; 6) least red cards received; 7) least yellow cards received; 8) draw.
(R) Relegated

==== Results summary ====
Overall								Home						Away					
Pld	W	D	L	GF	GA	GD	Pts	W	D	L	GF	GA	GD	W	D	L	GF	GA	GD
38	10	13	15	41	48	−7	43	9	5	5	29	24	+5	1	8	10	12	24	−12

Last updated: 2 December 2018.
Source: CBF

==== Result round by round ====
Round	1	2	3	4	5	6	7	8	9	10	11	12	13	14	15	16	17	18	19	20	21	22	23	24	25	26	27	28	29	30	31	32	33	34	35	36	37	38
Ground	H	A	A	H	H	A	A	H	H	A	H	A	H	H	A	H	A	A	H	A	H	H	A	A	H	H	A	A	H	A	H	A	A	H	A	H	H	A
Result	W	D	D	W	L	D	L	W	L	D	W	L	D	W	L	L	L	D	D	W	L	L	L	L	D	W	D	D	W	L	D	W	L	D	L	W	L	D
Position	6	4	4	4	7	9	12	12	16	16	16	16	16	16	16	16	16	16	16	16	16	16	16	16	16	16	16	16	16	16	16	16	16	16	16	16	16	16

Updated to match(es) played on 2 December 2018. Source: CBF
A = Away; H = Home; W = Win; D = Draw; L = Loss

==== Matches ====
15 April 2018 I	Vasco da Gama	2 – 1	Atlético Mineiro	Rio de Janeiro
16:00	Wágner 86'; Yago Pikachu 90+7' (pen.); Henrique (yellow card) 33'; Evander (yellow card) 41'; Ríos (yellow card) 73'; Rildo (yellow card) 78'	Report	12' Otero; (yellow card) 62' Bremer; (yellow card) 80' Yago; (yellow card) 88' Fábio Santos	Stadium: Estádio Vasco da Gama (São Januário); Attendance: 7,197; Referee: André Luiz Castro

22 April 2018 II	Chapecoense	1 – 1	Vasco da Gama	Chapecó
16:00	Wellington Paulista 19'; Vinícius Freitas (yellow card) 68'	Report	54' Ríos; (yellow card) 1' Wellington; (yellow card) 68' Wágner	Stadium: Arena Condá; Attendance: 8,675; Referee: Luiz Flavio de Oliveira

16 July 2018 III	Santos	v	Vasco da Gama	Santos, São Paulo
20:00				Stadium: Estádio Urbano Caldeira (Vila Belmiro)

5 May 2018 IV	Vasco da Gama	4 – 1	América (MG)	Rio de Janeiro
16:00	Bruno Cosendey 56'; Caio Monteiro 63'; Ríos 79' (yellow card) 57'; Kelvin 90+1'; Thiago Galhardo (yellow card) 30'; Wellington (yellow card) 66'; Wágner (yellow card) 72'	Report	31' Rafael Moura; (yellow card) 32' Wesley; (yellow card) 51' Norberto; (yellow card) 61' Aylon	Stadium: Estádio Vasco da Gama (São Januário); Attendance: 3,683; Referee: Flavio Rodrigues de Souza

13 May 2018 V	Vasco da Gama	2 – 3	Vitória	Rio de Janeiro
16:00	Yago Pikachu 39' (pen.); Ríos 82'; Breno (yellow card) 34'; Henrique (yellow card) 85'	Report	17' André Lima; 70' Lucas Fernandes; 74' Werley; (yellow card) 54' Fillipe Soutto; (yellow card) 78' Walisson Maia; (yellow card) 88' Willian Farias	Stadium: Estádio Vasco da Gama (São Januário); Attendance: 3,542; Referee: Jean Pierre Lima

19 May 2018 VI	Flamengo	1 – 1	Vasco da Gama	Rio de Janeiro
19:00	Vinícius Júnior 13'; Éverton Ribeiro (yellow card) 33'; Cuéllar (yellow card) 86' (red card) 90+6'; Rhodolfo (red card)	Report	18' Wágner; (yellow card) 41' Bruno; (yellow card) 81' Ríos; (yellow card) 89' Kelvin; (red card) Riascos; (red card) Breno	Stadium: Estádio Mário Filho (Maracanã); Referee: Ricardo Marques

27 May 2018 7	Bahia	3 – 0	Vasco da Gama	Salvador, Bahia
16:00	Júnior Brumado (yellow card) 37'; Élber 67'; Zé Rafael 89'; Régis 90+3'	Summary	Rafael Galhardo (yellow card) 37'; Desábato (yellow card) 38' (yellow-red card) 85'; Fabrício (yellow card) 40'; Ricardo (yellow card) 80'; Wagner (yellow card) 83'; Giovanni Augusto (yellow card) 83'	Stadium: Itaipava Arena Fonte Nova; Attendance: 15,031; Referee: Rodolpho Toski Marques

30 May 2018 8	Vasco da Gama	1 – 0	Paraná	Rio de Janeiro
19:30	Henrique (yellow card) 41'; Yago Pikachu 44'; Andrey (yellow card) 45+2'; Ricardo (yellow card) 68'; Matheus Moresche (red card) 90+3'	Summary	González (yellow card) 35'; Neris (yellow card) 71' (red card) 87'; Jhonny Lucas (yellow card) 90+1'	Stadium: Estádio Vasco da Gama (São Januário); Attendance: 4,584; Referee: Leandro Vuaden

2 June 2018 9	Vasco da Gama	1 – 2	Botafogo	Rio de Janeiro
19:00	Andrey 53'; Luiz Gustavo (yellow card) 73'; Wagner (yellow card) 74'	Summary	Kieza 4'; Rodrigo Pimpão (yellow card) 20'; Igor Rabello 35'; Jean (yellow card) 41'; Rodrigo Lindoso (yellow card) 65'; Marcinho (yellow card) 72'	Stadium: Estádio Vasco da Gama (São Januário); Attendance: 9,454; Referee: Raphael Claus

6 June 2018 10	Cruzeiro	1 – 1	Vasco da Gama	Belo Horizonte
21:45	Raniel 61'; Edílson (yellow card) 87'	Summary	Andrey 22'; Wagner (yellow card) 44'	Stadium: Estádio Governador Magalhães Pinto (Mineirão); Attendance: 23,725; Referee: Luiz Flavio De Oliveira

9 June 2018 11	Vasco da Gama	v	Sport do Recife	Rio de Janeiro
19:00				Stadium: Estádio Vasco da Gama (São Januário)

13 June 2018 12	Internacional	v	Vasco da Gama	Porto Alegre
21:45				Stadium: Estádio José Pinheiro Borda (Beira-Rio)

=== Copa do Brasil ===
Vasco da Gama joined the competition in the round of 16.

9 May 2018 Round of 16: leg I	Bahia	3 – 0	Vasco da Gama	Salvador, Bahia
21:45	Zé Rafael 18'; Edigar Junio 24'; Vinícius 49'; Léo Pelé (yellow card) 73'; João Pedro (yellow card) 87'	Report	(yellow card) 52' Wágner; (yellow card) 74' Kelvin	Stadium: Itaipava Arena Fonte Nova; Referee: Vinicius Goncalves Araujo

16 May 2018 Round of 16: leg II	Vasco da Gama	2 – 0 (2 – 3 agg.)	Bahia	Rio de Janeiro
19:00	Yago Pikachu 34' (pen.); Andrey 64'; Desábato (yellow card) 69'; Ricardo (yellow card) 90+1'; Ríos (red card) 90+4'	Summary	Vinícius (yellow card) 24'; Edigar Junio (yellow card) 34'; Lucas Fonseca (yellow card) 45+2'; Zé Rafael (yellow card) 45+5'; Léo (yellow card) 71' (red card) 90+6'; Edson (yellow card) 90+8'	Stadium: Estádio Vasco da Gama (São Januário); Attendance: 17,561; Referee: Rafael Traci

=== Copa Libertadores ===
Vasco da Gama joined the competition in the second qualifying stage.

==== Copa Libertadores squad ====
Note: Flags indicate national team as defined under FIFA eligibility rules; some limited exceptions apply. Players may hold more than one non-FIFA nationality.

No.	Pos.	Nation	Player
1	GK	URU	Martín Silva
2	DF	BRA	Rafael Galhardo
3	DF	ECU	Frickson Erazo
4	DF	BRA	Werley
5	MF	ARG	Leandro Luis Desábato
6	DF	BRA	Fabrício
7	MF	BRA	Wellington
8	MF	BRA	Thiago Galhardo
9	FW	ARG	Andrés Ríos
10	MF	BRA	Evander
11	FW	BRA	Paulinho
12	GK	BRA	Gabriel Félix
13	DF	BRA	Luiz Gustavo
14	DF	BRA	Ricardo
15	MF	BRA	Andrey

No.	Pos.	Nation	Player
16	DF	BRA	Henrique
17	FW	BRA	Rildo
18	FW	COL	Duvier Riascos
19	FW	BRA	Caio Monteiro
20	MF	BRA	Wágner
21	FW	BRA	Paulo Vitor
22	DF	BRA	Yago Pikachu
23	MF	BRA	Bruno Paulista
24	GK	BRA	João Pedro
25	DF	BRA	Paulão
26	MF	BRA	Giovanni Augusto (Note: Since group stage.)
27	DF	BRA	Ramon (Note: Since group stage.)
28	FW	BRA	Kelvin (Note: Since group stage.)
29	DF	BRA	Bruno (Note: Since group stage.)
30	DF	BRA	Breno (Note: Since group stage.)

==== Qualifying stages ====
31 January 2018 Second stage: leg I	Universidad de Concepción (Chile)	0 – 4	(Brazil) Vasco da Gama	Concepción, Chile
21:45	Droguett (yellow card) 32'; Portillo (yellow card) 65'	Report	2', 15' Evander; 78' Yago Pikachu; 81' Rildo; (yellow card) 35' Desábato; (yellow card) 42' Wellington; (yellow card) 61' Ricardo	Stadium: Estadio Alcaldesa Ester Roa Rebolledo (Collao); Referee: Leodan González (Uruguay)

7 February 2018 Second stage: leg II	Vasco da Gama (Brazil)	2 – 0	(Chile) Universidad de Concepción	Rio de Janeiro, Brazil
21:45	Paulinho 5'; Yago Pikachu 41'; Erazo (red card)	Report	(yellow card) 9' Mencia; (yellow card) 31' Morales; (yellow card) 44' Droguett; (yellow card) 57' Amarilla; (red card) de la Fuente	Stadium: Estádio Vasco da Gama (São Januário); Referee: José Argote (Venezuela)

14 February 2018 Third stage: leg I	Vasco da Gama (Brazil)	4 – 0	(Bolivia) Jorge Wilstermann	Rio de Janeiro, Brazil
21:45	Paulão 17'; Paulinho 40'; Yago Pikachu 87'; Rildo 90+3'; Desábato (yellow card) 67'	Report	(yellow card) 4' Montero; (yellow card) 16' Aponte; (yellow card) 50' Zenteno; (yellow card) 50' Lucas Gaúcho; (yellow card) 75' Díaz; (yellow card) 77' Serginho	Stadium: Estádio Vasco da Gama (São Januário); Referee: Fernando Rapallini (Argentina)

21 February 2018 Third stage: leg II	Jorge Wilstermann (Bolivia)	4 – 0 (4 – 4 agg.) (2 – 3 p)	(Brazil) Vasco da Gama	Sucre, Bolivia
21:45	Zenteno 5', 70'; Pedriel 6'; Chávez 16'; Alex Silva (yellow card) 19'; Lucas Gaúcho (yellow card) 75'; Serginho (yellow card) 83'	Report	(yellow card) 43' Silva; (yellow card) 77' Henrique; (red card) Thiago Galhardo; (yellow card) 85' Ricardo	Stadium: Estadio Olímpico Patria; Referee: Wilmar Roldán (Colombia)
	Penalties
	Lucas Gaúcho (penalty missed); Melgar (penalty scored); Meleán (penalty missed); Ortiz (penalty scored); Alex Silva (penalty missed)		(penalty scored) Ríos; (penalty scored) Yago Pikachu; (penalty missed) Desábato; (penalty scored) Wellington; (penalty missed) Rildo

==== Group stage ====
Pos	Team	Pld	W	D	L	GF	GA	GD	Pts	Qualification	CRU	RAC	VAS	UCH
1	(Brazil) Cruzeiro	6	3	2	1	15	5	+10	11	Round of 16	—	2–1	0–0	7–0
2	(Argentina) Racing	6	3	2	1	12	6	+6	11	Round of 16	4–2	—	4–0	1–0
3	(Brazil) Vasco da Gama	6	1	2	3	3	10	−7	5	Copa Sudamericana	0–4	1–1	—	0–1
4	Universidad de Chile	6	1	2	3	2	11	−9	5		0–0	1–1	0–2	—

Source: CONMEBOL
Rules for classification: Group stage tiebreakers

13 March 2018 I	Vasco da Gama (Brazil)	0 – 1	Universidad de Chile	Rio de Janeiro, Brazil
21:30	Riascos (yellow card) 18'; Paulão (yellow card) 74'	Report	76' Araos; (yellow card) 80' Caroca	Stadium: Estádio Vasco da Gama (São Januário); Referee: Daniel Fedorczuk (Uruguay)

4 April 2018 II	Cruzeiro (Brazil)	0 – 0	(Brazil) Vasco da Gama	Belo Horizonte, Brazil
21:45	Romero (yellow card) 47'	Report		Stadium: Estádio Governador Magalhães Pinto (Mineirão); Referee: Raphael Claus (Brazil)

19 April 2018 III	Racing de Avellaneda (Argentina)	4 – 0	(Brazil) Vasco da Gama	Avellaneda, Buenos Aires, Argentina
19:15	Centurión 32'; Martínez 38'; Zaracho 51'; López 60' (pen.); Sigali (yellow card) 18'	Report	(yellow card) 58' Wágner; (yellow card) 59' Wellington; 82' Ríos; 83' Paulão	Stadium: Estadio Presidente Juan Domingo Perón (El Cilindro); Referee: Ulises Mereles

26 April 2018 IV	Vasco da Gama (Brazil)	1 – 1	(Argentina) Racing de Avellaneda	Rio de Janeiro, Brazil
21:30	Wágner 80'; Desábato (yellow card) 14' (yellow-red card) 57'; Henrique (yellow card) 39'; Werley (yellow card) 51'	Report	31' Martínez; (yellow card) 45+3' Cardozo; (yellow card) 49' Barbieri; (yellow card) 60' Soto; (yellow card) 76' Zaracho	Stadium: Estádio Vasco da Gama (São Januário); Referee: Diego Haro (Peru)

2 May 2018 V	Vasco da Gama (Brazil)	0 – 4	(Brazil) Cruzeiro	Rio de Janeiro, Brazil
21:45	Henrique (yellow card) 56'	Report	9' Léo; 24' Thiago Neves; 32', 54' Sassá; (yellow card) 52' Henrique	Stadium: Estádio Vasco da Gama (São Januário); Referee: Anderson Daronco (Brazil)

22 May 2018 VI	Universidad de Chile	0 – 2	(Brazil) Vasco da Gama	Ñuñoa, Santiago, Chile
21:30	Echeverría (yellow card) 77'; Soteldo (yellow card) 85'	Report	14' Bruno; 81' (yellow card) 82' Yago Pikachu; (yellow card) 39' Breno; (yellow card) 61' Caio Monteiro; (yellow card) 85' Riascos	Stadium: Estadio Nacional Julio Martínez Prádanos; Referee: Gery Vargas (Bolivia)

=== Copa Sudamericana ===
Vasco da Gama joined the competition in the second qualifying stage.

25 July 2018 Second Qualifying First Leg	(Ecuador) LDU Quito	3–1	(Brazil) Vasco da Gama	Quito
17:30	Anangonó 8' 87'; Julio 20' (yellow card) 78'; Guerrero (yellow card) 34'	Summary	Ricardo (yellow card) 5'; Thiago Galhardo 54' (pen.); Silva (yellow card) 77'	Stadium: Estadio Rodrigo Paz Delgado; Referee: (Venezuela) Juan Soto

9 August 2018 Second Qualifying Second Leg	(Brazil) Vasco da Gama	1–0 (2–3 agg.)	(Ecuador) LDU Quito	Rio de Janeiro
17:30	Breno (yellow card) 8'; Luiz Gustavo (yellow card) 18'; Yago Pikachu (yellow card) 18'; Thiago Galhardo 86'	Summary	Gabbarini (yellow card) 37'; Guerrero (yellow card) 51'; Intriago (yellow card) 74'; Orejuela (yellow card) 88'	Stadium: Estádio São Januário; Referee: (Paraguay) Mario Díaz de Vivar

=== Campeonato do Estado do Rio de Janeiro ===
==== Taça Guanabara ====
===== Group stage =====
Group A
Pos	Team	Pld	W	D	L	GF	GA	GD	Pts	Qualification
1	Flamengo	5	4	1	0	5	0	+5	13	Advance to Semifinals
2	Bangu	5	2	2	1	6	3	+3	8	Advance to Semifinals
3	Vasco da Gama	5	2	1	2	8	7	+1	7	
4	Nova Iguaçu	5	1	2	2	5	6	−1	5	
5	Cabofriense	5	1	1	3	5	8	−3	4	
6	Volta Redonda	5	1	1	3	6	11	−5	4	

Updated to match(es) played on February 4, 2018. Source: FERJ
Rules for classification: 1) points; 2) goal difference; 3) number of goals scored.

18 January 2018 I	Vasco da Gama	0 – 2	Bangu	Rio de Janeiro
19:30	Nenê (yellow card) 68' (yellow-red card) 90+3'; Ríos (yellow card) 72'	Report	41' Rodney; 82' Anderson Lessa; (yellow card) 42' Michel	Stadium: Estádio Vasco da Gama (São Januário); Attendance: Behind closed doors Referee: Wagner do Nascimento Magalhães

21 January 2018 II	Vasco da Gama	4 – 2	Nova Iguaçu	Rio de Janeiro
17:00	Evander 14'; Ríos 26'; Yago Pikachu 80'; Andrey 87'	Report	61' (yellow card) 21' Murilo Henrique; 76' Bruno Smith	Stadium: Estádio Vasco da Gama (São Januário); Attendance: Behind closed doors Referee: Rodrigo Carvalhaes de Miranda

24 January 2018 III	Cabofriense	2 – 1	Vasco da Gama	Saquarema
17:00	Victor Silva 33'; Levi 90'; Leandro Euzébio (yellow card) 5'; Airton (yellow card) 16'; Kaká (yellow card) 29'; Davi Ceará (yellow card) 55'	Report	50' (pen.) Nenê; (yellow card) 5' Bruno Paulista; (yellow card) 83' Ricardo	Stadium: Estádio Elcyr Resende de Mendonça (Bacaxá); Attendance: 2,071; Referee: Rodrigo Nunes de Sá

27 January 2018 IV	Flamengo	0 – 0	Vasco da Gama	Rio de Janeiro
17:00	Renê (yellow card) 61'; Rhodolfo (yellow card) 79'; Jean Lucas (yellow card) 80'; Vinícius Júnior (yellow card) 82'	Report	(yellow card) 31' Desábato; (yellow card) 67' Yago Pikachu; (yellow card) 88' Riascos	Stadium: Estádio Mário Filho (Maracanã); Attendance: 20,862; Referee: Bruno Arleu de Araújo

4 February 2018 V	Vasco da Gama	3 – 1	Volta Redonda	Rio de Janeiro
17:00	Thiago Galhardo 1'; Bruno Costa 16' (o.g.); Bruno Cosendey 72'; Paulo Vitor (yellow card) 89'	Report	73' Marcelo; (yellow card) 25' Jorge Luiz; (yellow card) 47' Luiz Gustavo; (yellow card) 54' Pablo	Stadium: Estádio Vasco da Gama (São Januário); Attendance: 2,693; Referee: Pathrice Maia

==== Taça Rio de Janeiro ====
===== Group stage =====
Group A
Pos	Team	Pld	W	D	L	GF	GA	GD	Pts	Qualification
1	Vasco da Gama	6	4	1	1	12	8	+4	13	Advance to Semifinals
2	Flamengo	6	4	0	2	12	5	+7	12	Advance to Semifinals
3	Cabofriense	6	3	1	2	8	6	+2	10	
4	Bangu	6	1	2	3	5	11	−6	5	
5	Volta Redonda	6	0	3	3	5	9	−4	3	
6	Nova Iguaçu	6	0	1	5	5	11	−6	1	

Updated to match(es) played on March 18, 2018. Source: FERJ
Rules for classification: 1) points; 2) goal difference; 3) number of goals scored.

1 March 2018 I	Vasco da Gama	2 – 1	Macaé	Rio de Janeiro
19:30	Ríos 54'; Riascos 90+5' (yellow card) 90+6'	Report	38' Charles; (yellow card) 47' Igor João; (yellow card) 64' Matheus; (yellow card) 79' Admilton	Stadium: Estádio Vasco da Gama (São Januário); Attendance: 2,168; Referee: Wagner do Nascimento Magalhães

25 February 2018 II	Portuguesa da Ilha do Governador	1 – 0	Vasco da Gama	Mesquita
17:00	Tiago Amaral 29' (yellow card) 57'; Maicon Assis (yellow card) 71'; Luan (yellow card) 74'	Report	(yellow card) 11' Bruno Paulista; (yellow card) 56' Thiago Galhardo; (yellow card) 74' Erazo	Stadium: Estádio Giulite Coutinho (Édson Passos); Attendance: 3,158; Referee: Carlos Eduardo Braga

4 March 2018 III	Vasco da Gama	4 – 3	Boavista	Cariacica, Espírito Santo
19:30	Yago Pikachu 28'; Thiago Galhardo 74' (yellow card) 77'; Wágner 83'; Erazo 90+1'; Evander (yellow card) 51'	Report	31' (yellow card) 84' Júlio César; 45+1' Elivelton; 78' Lucas; (yellow card) 61' Vitor Faísca; Leandrão	Stadium: Estádio Kléber José de Andrade; Attendance: 7,461; Referee: Leonardo Cavaleiro

7 March 2018 IV	Vasco da Gama	0 – 0	Fluminense	Rio de Janeiro
19:30	Wellington (yellow card) 51'; Thiago Galhardo (yellow card) 87'; Henrique (yellow card) 90+2'	Report	(yellow card) 27' Jadson; (yellow card) 61' Richard; (yellow card) 88' Renato Chaves; (yellow card) 90+3' Gilberto	Stadium: Estádio Olímpico Nilton Santos (Engenhão); Attendance: 6,463; Referee: Marcelo de Lima Henrique

10 March 2018 V	Madureira	1 – 3	Vasco da Gama	Rio de Janeiro
16:00	Ygor Catatau 50'; William (yellow card) 24'; Rafinha (yellow card) 79'	Report	15' Evander; 33' (pen.) (yellow card) 37' Ríos; 55' Rildo	Stadium: Estádio Proletário Guilherme da Silveira Filho (Moça Bonita); Attendance: 2,324; Referee: Mauricio Coelho Junior

18 March 2018 VI	Botafogo	2 – 3	Vasco da Gama	Rio de Janeiro
16:00	Rodrigo Lindoso 50' (pen.); Brenner 68' (yellow card) 70'	Report	37' Riascos; 45+1' Ríos; 84' Paulinho; (yellow card) 6' Rildo; (yellow card) 45' Wellington; (yellow card) 58' Silva; (yellow card) 70' Henrique	Stadium: Estádio Olímpico Nilton Santos (Engenhão); Attendance: 12,647; Referee: Leonardo Cavaleiro

===== Knockout phase =====
21 March 2018 Semifinal	Vasco da Gama	2 – 3	Botafogo	Rio de Janeiro
21:45	Erazo 19'; Riascos 29'; Yago Pikachu (yellow card) 18'; Wellington (yellow card) 46'; Paulão (yellow card) 53'; Desábato (yellow card) 87'	Report	12' Brenner; 33' (yellow card) 52' Luiz Fernando; 83' (yellow card) 90+3' Igor Rabello; (yellow card) 27' Marcelo; (yellow card) 66' Rodrigo Lindoso	Stadium: Estádio Olímpico Nilton Santos (Engenhão); Attendance: 9,976; Referee: Wagner do Nascimento Magalhães

==== Championship phase ====
Pos	Team	Pld	W	D	L	GF	GA	GD	Pts	Qualification or relegation
1	Flamengo (A)	11	8	1	2	17	5	+12	25	Advance to Final Stage
2	Fluminense (A)	11	6	4	1	17	7	+10	22	Advance to Final Stage
3	Vasco da Gama (A)	11	6	2	3	20	15	+5	20	Advance to Final Stage
4	Botafogo (A)	11	5	4	2	12	9	+3	19	Advance to Final Stage
5	Boavista (Q)	11	6	0	5	16	17	−1	18	2019 Brasileiro Série D

Updated to match(es) played on March 18, 2018. Source: FERJ
Rules for classification: 1) points; 2) goal difference; 3) number of goals scored.
(A) Advance to a further round; (Q) Qualified for the phase indicated

29 March 2018 Semifinal	Fluminense	2 – 3	Vasco da Gama	Rio de Janeiro
21:00	Pedro 36'; Sornoza 48'; Renato Chaves (yellow card) 23'; Marcos Junio (yellow card) 57'; Ibañez (yellow card) 58'; Richard (yellow card) 90'; Pablo Dyego (yellow card) 90'; Rodolfo (yellow card) 90'	Report	23' Giovanni Augusto; 69' Paulinho; 90+3' (yellow card) 80' Fabrício; (yellow card) 46' Rafael Galhardo; (yellow card) 75' Paulão; (yellow card) 90' Wellington; (yellow card) 90' Erazo; (yellow card) 90' Riascos; (yellow card) 90' Silva	Stadium: Estádio Mário Filho (Maracanã); Attendance: 21,788; Referee: Rodrigo Nunes de Sá

1 April 2018 Finals: leg I	Botafogo	2 – 3	Vasco da Gama	Rio de Janeiro
16:00	Renatinho 3' (yellow card) 27'; Brenner 44'; Rodrigo Lindoso (yellow card) 36'; Carli (yellow card) 60'	Report	28', 31' Yago Pikachu; 90+2' (yellow card) 90' Ríos; (yellow card) 38' Fabrício; (yellow card) 60' Wellington; (yellow card) 80' Rafael Galhardo	Stadium: Estádio Olímpico Nilton Santos (Engenhão); Attendance: 19,117; Referee: Rodrigo Carvalhaes de Miranda

8 April 2018 Finals: leg II	Vasco da Gama	0 – 1 (3 – 3 agg.) (3 – 4 p)	Botafogo	Rio de Janeiro
16:00	Paulão (yellow card) 14'; Desábato (yellow card) 24'; Fabrício (red card); Werley (yellow card) 74'	Report	90+4' Carli; (yellow card) 45' Marcelo; (yellow card) 57' Rodrigo Pimpão; (yellow card) 89' (yellow-red card) 92' Valencia	Stadium: Estádio Mário Filho (Maracanã); Attendance: 64,208; Referee: Wagner do Nascimento Magalhães
	Penalties
	Wágner (penalty scored); Ríos (penalty scored); Werley (penalty missed); Yago Pikachu (penalty scored); Henrique (penalty missed)		(penalty scored) Brenner; (penalty missed) Rodrigo Pimpão; (penalty scored) Gilson; (penalty scored) Marcinho; (penalty scored) Renatinho

== Statistics ==
=== Squad appearances and goals ===
Last updated on 8 April 2018.

No.	Pos	Nat	Player	Total		Brasileirão Série A		Copa do Brasil		Copa Libertadores		Campeonato do Estado do Rio de Janeiro		Other (Note: Includes appearances in Copa Sudamericana and friendlies.)	
No.	Pos	Nat	Player	Apps	Goals	Apps	Goals	Apps	Goals	Apps	Goals	Apps	Goals	Apps	Goals
Goalkeepers
1	GK	(Uruguay) URU	Martín Silva	11	0	0	0	0	0	0	0	11	0	0	0
12	GK	(Brazil) BRA	Gabriel Félix	4	0	0	0	0	0	0	0	4	0	0	0
24	GK	(Brazil) BRA	João Pedro	0	0	0	0	0	0	0	0	0	0	0	0
33	GK	(Brazil) BRA	Fernando Miguel	0	0	0	0	0	0	0	0	0	0	0	0
	GK	(Brazil) BRA	Jordi	0	0	0	0	0	0	0	0	0	0	0	0
Defenders
2	DF	(Brazil) BRA	Rafael Galhardo	8	0	0	0	0	0	0	0	7+1	0	0	0
3	DF	(Ecuador) ECU	Frickson Erazo	11	2	0	0	0	0	0	0	11	2	0	0
4	DF	(Brazil) BRA	Breno	0	0	0	0	0	0	0	0	0	0	0	0
6	DF	(Brazil) BRA	Fabrício	8	1	0	0	0	0	0	0	7+1	1	0	0
13	DF	(Brazil) BRA	Luiz Gustavo	4	0	0	0	0	0	0	0	2+2	0	0	0
14	DF	(Brazil) BRA	Ricardo	6	0	0	0	0	0	0	0	5+1	0	0	0
16	DF	(Brazil) BRA	Henrique	9	0	0	0	0	0	0	0	8+1	0	0	0
22	DF	(Brazil) BRA	Yago Pikachu	11	4	0	0	0	0	0	0	11	4	0	0
25	DF	(Brazil) BRA	Paulão	9	0	0	0	0	0	0	0	9	0	0	0
27	DF	(Brazil) BRA	Ramon	0	0	0	0	0	0	0	0	0	0	0	0
29	DF	(Brazil) BRA	Bruno	0	0	0	0	0	0	0	0	0	0	0	0
34 (4)	DF	(Brazil) BRA	Werley	5	0	0	0	0	0	0	0	4+1	0	0	0
Midfielders
5	MF	(Argentina) ARG	Leandro Luis Desábato	12	0	0	0	0	0	0	0	11+1	0	0	0
7	MF	(Brazil) BRA	Wellington	10	0	0	0	0	0	0	0	10	0	0	0
8	MF	(Brazil) BRA	Thiago Galhardo	8	2	0	0	0	0	0	0	2+6	2	0	0
10	MF	(Brazil) BRA	Evander	9	2	0	0	0	0	0	0	9	2	0	0
15	MF	(Brazil) BRA	Andrey	6	1	0	0	0	0	0	0	4+2	1	0	0
20	MF	(Brazil) BRA	Wágner	11	1	0	0	0	0	0	0	9+2	1	0	0
23	MF	(Brazil) BRA	Bruno Paulista	4	0	0	0	0	0	0	0	3+1	0	0	0
26	MF	(Brazil) BRA	Giovanni Augusto	3	1	0	0	0	0	0	0	3	1	0	0
32	MF	(Brazil) BRA	Bruno Cosendey	1	1	0	0	0	0	0	0	0+1	1	0	0
Forwards
9	FW	(Argentina) ARG	Andrés Ríos	12	5	0	0	0	0	0	0	8+4	5	0	0
11	FW	(Brazil) BRA	Paulinho	11	2	0	0	0	0	0	0	7+4	2	0	0
17	FW	(Brazil) BRA	Rildo	9	1	0	0	0	0	0	0	6+3	1	0	0
18	FW	(Colombia) COL	Duvier Riascos	11	3	0	0	0	0	0	0	8+3	3	0	0
19	FW	(Brazil) BRA	Caio Monteiro	7	0	0	0	0	0	0	0	2+5	0	0	0
21	FW	(Brazil) BRA	Paulo Vitor	7	0	0	0	0	0	0	0	0+7	0	0	0
28	FW	(Brazil) BRA	Kelvin	0	0	0	0	0	0	0	0	0	0	0	0
Players of second squads who have made an appearance or had a squad number this season
	MF	(Brazil) BRA	Lucas	0	0	0	0	0	0	0	0	0	0	0	0
	MF	(Brazil) BRA	Marcelo Mattos	0	0	0	0	0	0	0	0	0	0	0	0
Players of youth squads who have made an appearance or had a squad number this season
	FW	(Brazil) BRA	Hugo Borges	1	0	0	0	0	0	0	0	0+1	0	0	0
	MF	(Brazil) BRA	Marrony	1	0	0	0	0	0	0	0	0+1	0	0	0
	DF	(Brazil) BRA	Miranda	0	0	0	0	0	0	0	0	0	0	0	0
	MF	(Brazil) BRA	Rafael França	1	0	0	0	0	0	0	0	0+1	0	0	0
	FW	(Brazil) BRA	Lucas Santos	1	0	0	0	0	0	0	0	0+1	0	0	0
	DF	(Brazil) BRA	Ulisses	0	0	0	0	0	0	0	0	0	0	0	0
Players who have made an appearance or had a squad number this season but have transferred or loaned out during the season
	FW	(Brazil) BRA	Nenê	2	1	0	0	0	0	0	0	2	1	0	0
	MF	(Argentina) ARG	Damián Escudero	0	0	0	0	0	0	0	0	0	0	0	0
	MF	(Brazil) BRA	Guilherme	2	0	0	0	0	0	0	0	1+1	0	0	0
	FW	(Brazil) BRA	Luís Fabiano	0	0	0	0	0	0	0	0	0	0	0	0
31	DF	(Brazil) BRA	Alan	1	0	0	0	0	0	0	0	1	0	0	0

=== Goals ===
As of 18 December 2017

Rank	Player	Position	Brasileirão Série A	Copa do Brasil	Copa Libertadores	Other^{1}	Total
Total							

^{1} Includes Rio de Janeiro State Championship and friendlies.

=== Clean sheets ===
As of 16 December 2017

Rank	Name	Brasileirão Série A	Copa do Brasil	Copa Libertadores	Other^{1}	Total
Total						

^{1} Includes Rio de Janeiro State Championship and friendlies.

=== Disciplinary record ===
N	P	Nat.	Name	Brasileirão Série A			Copa do Brasil			Copa Libertadores			Other^{1}			Total			Notes
N	P	Nat.	Name	Yellow card	Second yellow card	Red card	Yellow card	Second yellow card	Red card	Yellow card	Second yellow card	Red card	Yellow card	Second yellow card	Red card	Yellow card	Second yellow card	Red card	Notes

Last updated: 18 December 2017
Source: Matches
Ordered by (red card) , (second yellow card) and (yellow card)
(yellow card) = Number of bookings; (second yellow card) = Number of sending offs after a second yellow card; (red card) = Number of sending offs by a direct red card.

^{1} Includes Rio de Janeiro State Championship and friendlies.
