= 2018 Campeonato Carioca =

Campeonato Carioca
- Season: 2018
- Dates: 20 December 2017 – 8 April 2018
- Champions: Botafogo
- Relegated: America; Bonsucesso
- Copa do Brasil: Boavista; Botafogo; Fluminense; Vasco da Gama
- Série D: Boavista; Portuguesa
- Matches: 103
- Goals: 270 (2.62 per match)
- Top goalscorer: Pedro (7 goals)

The 2018 Campeonato Carioca de Futebol was the 115th edition of the Campeonato Carioca, organized by FFERJ (Federação de Futebol do Estado do Rio de Janeiro, or Rio de Janeiro State Football Federation). The top four teams in the final standings of the tournament not otherwise qualified competed in the 2019 Copa do Brasil. The top two teams not competing in any level of the national Campeonato Brasileiro qualified for the 2019 Campeonato Brasileiro Série D.

The format remained unchanged from the 2017 edition. In the First Round, six teams played a round-robin tournament, with the top two teams qualified for the main competition and the bottom four entering the Relegation Round. The main competition was divided into two tournaments, the Taça Guanabara and Taça Rio, each with two 6-team groups. The top two placed teams in each of the groups qualified to contest the state title. The top four teams in the final standings qualified automatically for the Final Round (the Taça Guanabara and Taça Rio champions). The Final Round was a knockout-style playoff with a two-legged final played at the Maracanã Stadium. Macaé was punished with the loss of 26 points by the Rio de Janeiro State Sports Tribunal (TJD-RJ) for the irregular escalation of left-side Luke Gabriel in six matches of the Taça Rio.

== Participating teams ==
Location of teams in the 2018 Campeonato Carioca
Location of teams in the 2018 Campeonato Carioca – city of Rio de Janeiro

Club	Home City	Manager	2017 Finish
America Football Club	Mesquita	Lucho Nizzo and Duílio	2nd (Série B1)
Bangu Atlético Clube	Rio de Janeiro (Bangu)	Alfredo Sampaio	10th
Boavista Sport Club	Saquarema	Eduardo Allax	8th
Bonsucesso Futebol Clube	Saquarema and Rio de Janeiro (Bangu) (Note: Although Bonsucesso FC is headquartered in Bonsucesso, it played first round home games at Elcyr Resende Stadium and relegation playoff home games at Moça Bonita Stadium)	Marcelo Salles and Toninho Andrade	14th
Botafogo de Futebol e Regatas	Rio de Janeiro (Engenho de Dentro) (Note: Although Botafogo FR is headquartered in Botafogo, it plays home games at Engenhão Stadium)	Felipe Conceição and Alberto Valentim	4th
Associação Desportiva Cabofriense	Cabo Frio	Antônio Carlos Roy	13th
Clube de Regatas do Flamengo	Rio de Janeiro (Maracanã) (Note: Although CR Flamengo is headquartered in Lagoa, it plays home games at Maracanã Stadium)	Paulo César Carpegiani	1st
Fluminense Football Club	Rio de Janeiro (Maracanã) (Note: Although Fluminense FC is headquartered in Laranjeiras, it plays home games at Maracanã Stadium)	Abel Braga	2nd
Goytacaz Futebol Clube	Campos dos Goytacazes	Paulo Henrique	1st (Série B1)
Macaé Esporte Futebol Clube	Macaé	Josué Teixeira	12th
Madureira Esporte Clube	Rio de Janeiro (Madureira)	PC Gusmão, Djair and Gilberto de Souza Coroa	6th
Nova Iguaçu Futebol Clube	Nova Iguaçu	Edson Souza	5th
Associação Atlética Portuguesa	Rio de Janeiro (Governador)	João Carlos Ângelo	9th
Resende Futebol Clube	Resende	Carlos Leiria, Marcelo Cabo and Rodolfo Oliveira	11th
Club de Regatas Vasco da Gama	Rio de Janeiro (Vasco da Gama)	Zé Ricardo	3rd
Volta Redonda Futebol Clube	Volta Redonda	Felipe Surian and Marcelo Salles	7th

== First round ==
The First Round was contested in a round-robin format from 20 December 2017 to 13 January 2018 by six teams: the two final teams from the 2017 Campeonato Carioca Série B1 (Goytacaz and America), the bottom two teams from the 2017 Campeonato Carioca main competition (Resende and Macaé), and the two surviving teams from the 2017 Campeonato Carioca Relegation Round (Cabofriense and Bonsucesso). The two top placed teams qualified to contest 2018 Campeonato Carioca, one team each placed in Group A and Group B. The remaining four teams contested in the 2018 Relegation Round.

Pos	Team	Pld	W	D	L	GF	GA	GD	Pts	Qualification or relegation
1	Cabofriense (Q)	5	3	1	1	8	3	+5	10	Championship round
2	Macaé (Q)	5	3	1	1	8	5	+3	10	Championship round
3	Goytacaz	5	3	1	1	9	7	+2	10	Relegation playoffs
4	Bonsucesso	5	2	0	3	6	8	−2	6	Relegation playoffs
5	America	5	1	1	3	8	10	−2	4	Relegation playoffs
6	Resende	5	1	0	4	6	12	−6	3	Relegation playoffs

Updated to match(es) played on January 13, 2018. Source: FERJ
Rules for classification: 1) points; 2) goal difference; 3) number of goals scored.
(Q) Qualified for the phase indicated

Home \ Away	AME	BON	CAB	GOY	MAC	RES
América		0–1	2–1	1–2		
Bonsucesso			0–2	1–3	0–1	
Cabofriense					1–0	3–0
Goytacaz			1–1			2–1
Macaé	3–3			3–1		
Resende	3–2	2–4			0–1	

Source: FERJ
Legend: Blue = home team win; Yellow = draw; Red = away team win.

== Championship round ==
The Championship Round was two competitions: Taça Guanabara and Taça Rio. The twelve clubs were into two groups of six, Group A and Group B. The traditional "big four" teams of Rio de Janeiro (Flamengo, Botafogo, Fluminense, and Vasco da Gama) were separated with two teams placed in each group. Each round had its own four-team playoff featuring the top two teams of each group. The Taça Rio was followed by a four-team Final playoff featuring the top four teams of the combined table across both competitions (the competition playoff champion(s) automatically qualified for the Final playoff).

=== Taça Guanabara ===
The Taça Guanabara was played from 16 January 2018 to 4 February 2018. It was a single round-robin format with each team playing one match with the teams of their own group. The two top point teams qualified for the knockout stage of the competition. The champion of Taça Guanabara qualified to the Final Stage.

Group A
Pos	Team	Pld	W	D	L	GF	GA	GD	Pts	Qualification
1	Flamengo	5	4	1	0	5	0	+5	13	Advance to Semifinals
2	Bangu	5	2	2	1	6	3	+3	8	Advance to Semifinals
3	Vasco da Gama	5	2	1	2	8	7	+1	7	
4	Nova Iguaçu	5	1	2	2	5	6	−1	5	
5	Cabofriense	5	1	1	3	5	8	−3	4	
6	Volta Redonda	5	1	1	3	6	11	−5	4	

Updated to match(es) played on February 4, 2018. Source: FERJ
Rules for classification: 1) points; 2) goal difference; 3) number of goals scored.

Home \ Away	BAN	CAB	FLA	NIG	VAS	VRE
Bangu				0–0		2–2
Cabofriense	0–2				2–1	
Flamengo	1–0	1–0			0–0	
Nova Iguaçu		1–1	0–1			2–0
Vasco da Gama	0–2			4–2		3–1
Volta Redonda		3–2	0–2			

Source: FERJ
Legend: Blue = home team win; Yellow = draw; Red = away team win.

Group B
Pos	Team	Pld	W	D	L	GF	GA	GD	Pts	Qualification
1	Boavista	5	3	0	2	5	3	+2	9	Advance to Semifinals
2	Botafogo	5	2	3	0	5	3	+2	9	Advance to Semifinals
3	Fluminense	5	2	2	1	4	4	0	8	
4	Portuguesa	5	1	3	1	4	4	0	6	
5	Macaé	5	1	1	3	5	7	−2	4	
6	Madureira	5	0	3	2	3	5	−2	3	

Updated to match(es) played on February 3, 2018. Source: FERJ
Rules for classification: 1) points; 2) goal difference; 3) number of goals scored.

Home \ Away	BOA	BOT	FLU	MAC	MAD	POR
Boavista			3–1	0–1		
Botafogo	1–0				0–0	2–2
Fluminense		0–0		1–0		0–0
Macaé		1–2				1–2
Madureira	0–1		1–2	2–2		
Portuguesa	0–1				0–0	

Source: FERJ
Legend: Blue = home team win; Yellow = draw; Red = away team win.

==== Knockout stage ====
Semifinals
1	Boavista	2
2	Bangu	2
1	Flamengo	3
2	Botafogo	1

Final
Boavista	0
Flamengo	2

===== Semi-finals =====
8 February 2018
17:00 UTC−03:00

Boavista	2 - 2	Bangu
Fellype Gabriel 35', 41' (pen.)	Report	58' Nilson; 72' Almir

Nilton Santos, Rio de Janeiro
Attendance: 2,145
Referee: Pathrice Wallace Corrêa Maia

10 February 2018
16:30 UTC−03:00

Flamengo	3 - 1	Botafogo
Everton 35'; Henrique Dourado 48'; Vinicius Junior 90+3'	Report	68' Kieza

Raulino de Oliveira, Volta Redonda
Attendance: 5,460
Referee: Bruno Arleu de Araújo

===== Final =====
18 February 2018
16:00 UTC−03:00

Boavista	0 - 2	Flamengo
	Report	43' (o.g.) Kadu Fernandes; 77' Vinícius Júnior

Kléber Andrade, Cariacica
Attendance: 17,787
Referee: Rodrigo Nunes de Sá

Taça Guanabara
2018 champion
Flamengo
21st title

=== Taça Rio ===
The Taça Rio tournament was from 19 February 2018 to 18 March 2018. Group A and Group B remained the same as in Taça Guanabara, but each team played a single match round-robin against the teams of the other group. The top two teams in points in each group qualified for the knockout stage of the competition. The champion of Taça Rio qualified to the Final Stage.

Group A
Pos	Team	Pld	W	D	L	GF	GA	GD	Pts	Qualification
1	Vasco da Gama	6	4	1	1	12	8	+4	13	Advance to Semifinals
2	Flamengo	6	4	0	2	12	5	+7	12	Advance to Semifinals
3	Cabofriense	6	3	1	2	8	6	+2	10	
4	Bangu	6	1	2	3	5	11	−6	5	
5	Volta Redonda	6	0	3	3	5	9	−4	3	
6	Nova Iguaçu	6	0	1	5	5	11	−6	1	

Updated to match(es) played on March 18, 2018. Source: FERJ
Rules for classification: 1) points; 2) goal difference; 3) number of goals scored.

Group B
Pos	Team	Pld	W	D	L	GF	GA	GD	Pts	Qualification
1	Fluminense	6	4	2	0	13	3	+10	14	Advance to Semifinals
2	Botafogo	6	3	1	2	7	6	+1	10	Advance to Semifinals
3	Portuguesa	6	3	1	2	7	8	−1	10	
4	Boavista	6	3	0	3	11	14	−3	9	
5	Macaé	6	2	2	2	7	6	+1	8	
6	Madureira	6	1	2	3	5	10	−5	5	

Updated to match(es) played on March 18, 2018. Source: FERJ
Rules for classification: 1) points; 2) goal difference; 3) number of goals scored.

Home \ Away	BAN	BOA	BOT	CAB	FLA	FLU	MAC	MAD	NIG	POR	VAS	VRE
Bangu						0–4		0–3		1–1		
Boavista	0–2				0–3				2–1			
Botafogo	1–0			1–0							2–3	
Cabofriense		2–3				1–1	1–0					
Flamengo			1–0					4–0		4–0		
Fluminense					4–0				2–1			1–0
Macaé	2–2				1–0							1–1
Madureira				0–2							1–3	0–0
Nova Iguaçu			1–2				0–2	1–1				
Portuguesa				1–2					2–1		1–0	
Vasco da Gama		4–3				0–0	2–1					
Volta Redonda		2–3	1–1							0–2		

Source: FERJ
Legend: Blue = home team win; Yellow = draw; Red = away team win.

==== Knockout stage ====
Semifinals
1	Fluminense	1
2	Flamengo	1
1	Vasco da Gama	2
2	Botafogo	3

Final
Fluminense	3
Botafogo	0

===== Semi-finals =====
21 March 2018
21:45 UTC−03:00

Vasco da Gama	2 - 3	Botafogo
Erazo 18'; Riascos 29'	Report	12' Brenner; 33' Luiz Fernando; 83' Igor Rabello

Nilton Santos, Rio de Janeiro
Attendance: 9,976
Referee: Wagner do Nascimento Magalhães

22 March 2018
20:00 UTC−03:00

Fluminense	1 - 1	Flamengo
Gum 45'	Report	86' Éverton

Nilton Santos, Rio de Janeiro
Attendance: 18,627
Referee: Maurício Machado Coelho Júnior

===== Final =====
25 March 2018
16:00 UTC−03:00

Fluminense	3 - 0	Botafogo
Pedro 12'; Marcos Júnior 56'; Jadson 90'	Report

Maracanã, Rio de Janeiro
Attendance: 26,842
Referee: Bruno Arleu de Araújo

Taça Rio
2018 champion
Fluminense
3rd title

== Relegation playoffs ==
The Relegation Round was played from 20 January 2018 to 4 March 2018 in a double round-robin format. The two top placed teams qualified for the First Round of the 2019 Campeonato Carioca and the two placed bottom teams were relegated to the 2018 Campeonato Carioca Série B1.

Pos	Team	Pld	W	D	L	GF	GA	GD	Pts	Relegation
1	Goytacaz	6	2	3	1	9	9	0	9	
2	Resende	6	2	2	2	7	7	0	8	
3	America (R)	6	2	1	3	11	10	+1	7	Relegation to 2018 Série B1
4	Bonsucesso (R)	6	1	4	1	8	9	−1	7	Relegation to 2018 Série B1

Updated to match(es) played on March 4, 2018. Source: FERJ
Rules for classification: 1) points; 2) goal difference; 3) number of goals scored.
(R) Relegated

Home \ Away	AME	BON	GOY	RES
America		3–1	4–1	1–2
Bonsucesso	1–1		1–1	1–1
Goytacaz	1–1	2–2		1–0
Resende	2–1	1–2	1–1	

Source: FERJ
Legend: Blue = home team win; Yellow = draw; Red = away team win.

== Overall table ==
Pos	Team	Pld	W	D	L	GF	GA	GD	Pts	Qualification or relegation
1	Flamengo (A)	11	8	1	2	17	5	+12	25	Advance to Final Stage
2	Fluminense (A)	11	6	4	1	17	7	+10	22	Advance to Final Stage
3	Vasco da Gama (A)	11	6	2	3	20	15	+5	20	Advance to Final Stage
4	Botafogo (A)	11	5	4	2	12	9	+3	19	Advance to Final Stage
5	Boavista (Q)	11	6	0	5	16	17	−1	18	2019 Brasileiro Série D
6	Portuguesa (Q)	11	4	4	3	11	12	−1	16	2019 Brasileiro Série D
7	Cabofriense	11	4	2	5	13	14	−1	14	
8	Bangu	11	3	4	4	11	14	−3	13	
9	Madureira	11	1	5	5	8	15	−7	8	
10	Volta Redonda	11	1	4	6	11	20	−9	7	
11	Nova Iguaçu (R)	11	1	3	7	10	17	−7	6	2019 Campeonato Carioca First Round
12	Macaé (R)	11	3	3	5	12	13	−1	−14	2019 Campeonato Carioca First Round

Updated to match(es) played on March 18, 2018. Source: FERJ
Rules for classification: 1) points; 2) goal difference; 3) number of goals scored.
(A) Advance to a further round; (Q) Qualified for the phase indicated; (R) Relegated

== Final stage ==
Semi-final
1	Flamengo	0
4	Botafogo	1
2	Fluminense	2
3	Vasco da Gama	3

Finals
Botafogo	2	1	3 (4)
Vasco da Gama	3	0	3 (3)

=== Semi-finals ===
28 March 2018
21:45 UTC−03:00

Flamengo	0–1	Botafogo
	Report	39' Luiz Fernando

Maracanã, Rio de Janeiro
Attendance: 31,888
Referee: Marcelo de Lima Henrique

29 March 2018
21:00 UTC−03:00

Fluminense	2 - 3	Vasco da Gama
Pedro 39'; Junior Sornoza 49'	Report	27' Giovanni Augusto; 70' Paulinho; 90+5' Fabrício

Maracanã, Rio de Janeiro
Attendance: 21,788
Referee: Rodrigo Nunes de Sá

=== Final ===
1 April 2018
16:00 UTC−03:00

Botafogo	2 - 3	Vasco da Gama
Renatinho 4'; Brenner 45'	Report	29', 31' Yago Pikachu; 90+4' Andrés Ríos

Nilton Santos, Rio de Janeiro
Attendance: 19,117
Referee: Rodrigo Carvalhaes de Miranda

8 April 2018
16:00 UTC−03:00

Vasco da Gama	0–1	Botafogo
		90+5' Joel Carli
Penalties
Wágner (penalty scored); Andrés Ríos (penalty scored); Werley (penalty missed); Yago Pikachu (penalty scored); Henrique (penalty missed)	3–4	(penalty scored) Brenner; (penalty missed) Rodrigo Pimpão; (penalty scored) Gilson; (penalty scored) Marcinho; (penalty scored) Renatinho

Maracanã, Rio de Janeiro
Attendance: 64,208
Referee: Wagner do Nascimento Magalhães

Campeonato Carioca
2018 champion

Botafogo
21st title

== Awards ==
=== Team of the year ===
Pos.	Player	Club
GK	(Brazil) Júlio César	Fluminense
DF	(Brazil) Yago Pikachu	Vasco da Gama
DF	(Brazil) Gum	Fluminense
DF	(Brazil) Igor Rabello	Botafogo
DF	(Brazil) Ayrton Lucas	Fluminense
MF	(Brazil) Rodrigo Lindoso	Botafogo
MF	(Argentina) Leandro Desábato	Vasco da Gama
MF	(Brazil) Lucas Paquetá	Flamengo
FW	(Brazil) Marcos Júnior	Fluminense
FW	(Brazil) Pedro	Fluminense
FW	(Brazil) Paulinho	Vasco da Gama
HC	(Brazil) Zé Ricardo	Vasco da Gama

Source FERJ
Last updated: 9 April 2018

== Top scorers ==
As of 17 April 2019

Rank	Player	Club	Goals
1.	(Brazil) Pedro	Fluminense	7
2.	(Brazil) Brenner	Botafogo	6
2.	(Brazil) Marcos Júnior	Fluminense	6
2.	(Brazil) Pipico	Macaé	6
3.	(Argentina) Andrés Ríos	Vasco da Gama	5
3.	(Brazil) Dija Baiano	Volta Redonda	5
3.	(Brazil) Jackson	Bonsucesso	5
