= Paulinho (footballer, born July 2000) =

Brazilian footballer

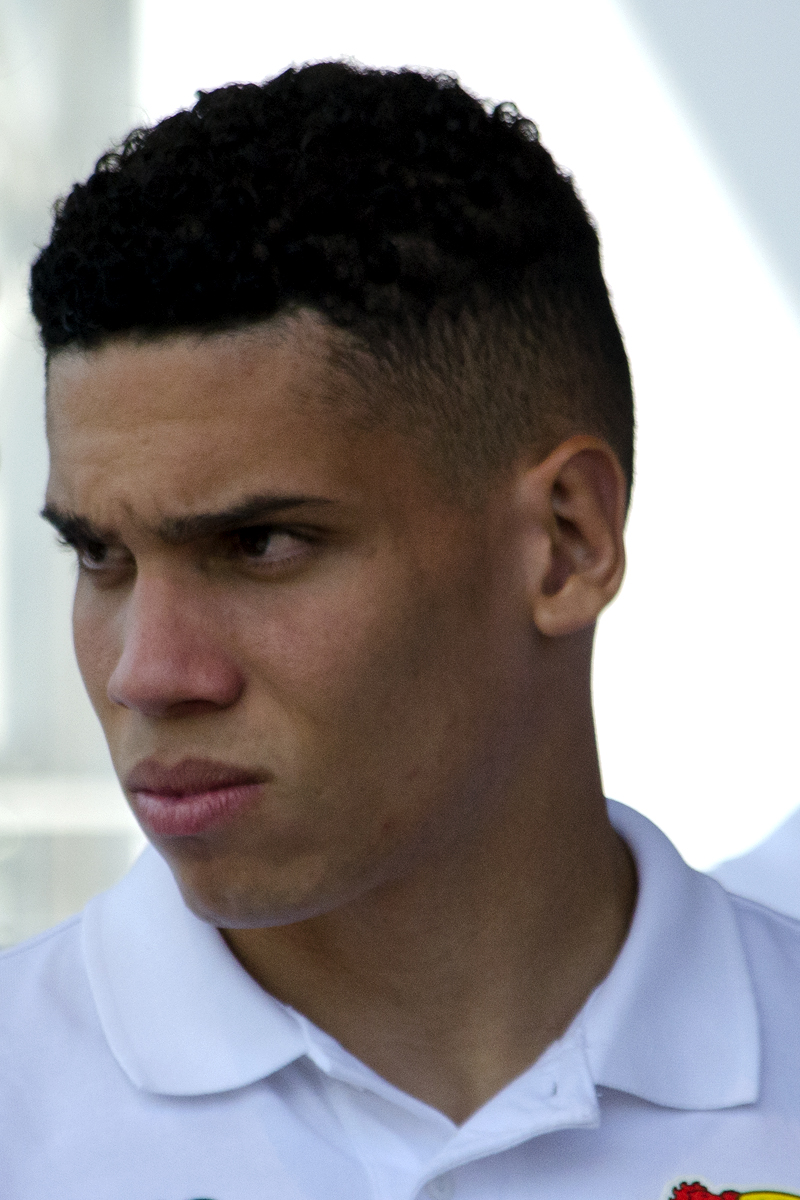
- Paulinho with Bayer Leverkusen in 2018

Personal information
- Full name: Paulo Henrique Sampaio Filho
- Date of birth: 15 July 2000 (age 26)
- Place of birth: Rio de Janeiro, Brazil
- Height: 1.77 m (5 ft 10 in)
- Positions: Forward; winger

Team information
- Current team: Palmeiras
- Number: 10

Youth career
- 2010–2017: Vasco da Gama

Senior career*
Years	Team	Apps	(Gls)
2017–2018	Vasco da Gama	29	(5)
2018–2023	Bayer Leverkusen	57	(8)
2023	→ Atlético Mineiro (loan)	22	(5)
2023–2024	Atlético Mineiro	62	(27)
2025–	Palmeiras	13	(2)

International career^{‡}
2015–2016	Brazil U15	6	(3)
2016–2017	Brazil U17	21	(7)
2019–2021	Brazil U23	25	(7)
2023–	Brazil	1	(0)
Medal record
Men's football
Representing Brazil
Olympic Games
Gold medal – first place	2020 Tokyo	Team
Representing Brazil
FIFA U-17 World Cup
Third place	2017 India
South American U-17 Championship
Winner	2017 Chile
South American U-15 Championship
Winner	2015 Colombia
- * Club domestic league appearances and goals as of 26 July 2026 ‡ National team caps and goals as of 14:08, 16 November 2023 (UTC)

Paulo Henrique Sampaio Filho, commonly known as Paulinho (Brazilian Portuguese: [pawˈlĩɲu]; born 15 July 2000), is a Brazilian professional footballer who plays as a forward or winger for Campeonato Brasileiro Série A club Palmeiras and the Brazil national team.

== Club career ==
=== Vasco da Gama ===
==== 2017 season ====
Having progressed through Vasco da Gama's academy, Paulinho was promoted to the club's first-team squad under the management of Milton Mendes on 19 June 2017. On 13 July 2017, two days before his seventeenth birthday, Paulinho made his professional debut when he was brought on as a 93rd-minute substitute in a 4–1 Brasileirão Série A away win over Vitória. Minutes after entering the field of play, he recorded his professional assist when he set up teammate Guilherme for his side's fourth goal. Eleven days later, he made his first professional start and scored twice in a 2–1 league away win over Atlético Mineiro, becoming the youngest player ever to score at Brasileirão Série A and the first player born at 2000s to score at Brasileirão Série A. On 3 December 2017, Paulinho opened the scoring of a 2–1 home win over Ponte Preta at the last round of 2017 Brasileirão Série A and helped Vasco da Gama to reach a qualification to Copa Libertadores next season.

==== 2018 season ====
Paulinho made his first Copa Libertadores assist when he set up Evander to open the score in a 4–0 away win over Universidad de Concepción, by the 1st leg of Copa Libertadores second qualifying stage. On the 2nd leg, Paulinho made his first Copa Libertadores goal opening the score in a 2–0 home win over Universidad de Concepción. His goal made him the first player born at 2000s to score at Copa Libertadores.

=== Bayer Leverkusen ===
On 27 April 2018, German club Bayer Leverkusen announced that they had reached an agreement with Vasco da Gama for the transfer of Paulinho. The clubs agreed to a €20 million fee, a club-record deal for Vasco. He joined Leverkusen ahead of the 2018–19 season and signed a five-year contract.

=== Atlético Mineiro ===
On 1 December 2022, Paulinho joined Atlético Mineiro on loan until June 2023. He made his debut on 21 January 2023 in a Campeonato Mineiro 2–1 win over Caldense and scored his first goal in the following match, a 2–1 win over Tombense.

On 1 July, he signed a four-and-a-half-year deal with the club on a free transfer.

On 27 August, Paulinho scored the first official goal in Atlético Mineiro's newly inaugurated stadium Arena MRV, with a brace in a Série A 2–0 win over Santos.

Paulinho was the top scorer of the 2023 Campeonato Brasileiro Série A season, with 20 goals in 36 appearances.

Paulinho announced his departure from Atlético Mineiro at the end of the 2024 season. During his two-season stint with the club, he scored 50 goals and provided 12 assists in 120 matches, winning the Campeonato Mineiro titles in 2023 and 2024. In addition to being the top scorer of the Campeonato Brasileiro in 2023, he was also the team's overall top scorer for both years (shared with Hulk in 2024) and became the club's second-highest scorer in Copa Libertadores history, with 14 goals.

=== Palmeiras ===
On 31 December 2024, Palmeiras announced the signing of Paulinho on a five-year deal with the club paying €18 million for his signature.

== International career ==
=== Youth ===
In March 2017, Paulinho, along with Vinícius Júnior, Lincoln and Alan, helped Brazil win the South American Under-17 Championship. He scored two goals during the tournament, including the opening goal in Brazil's 5–0 win over Chile in the final.

In October 2017, Paulinho helped Brazil reach 3rd place of 2017 FIFA U-17 World Cup. Paulinho scored the winning goals against Spain at Brazil's debut, North Korea and in quarterfinals against Germany.

On 17 June 2021, Paulinho was named in the Brazil squad for the 2020 Summer Olympics. Coming on as a substitute, he scored in Brazil's opening game against Germany.

=== Senior ===
Paulinho received his first call-up to the Brazil senior team on 6 November 2023, making his debut in a World Cup qualifier against Colombia ten days later.

== Personal life ==
Following the goal he scored in a 4–2 victory over Germany at the 2020 Olympics, Paulinho celebrated by imitating an archer in homage to Oshosi, a popular orisha or spirit in Afro-Brazilian religion. Paulinho later stated that he performed the celebration to draw attention to the prejudice that followers of Candomblé and other minority religions face in Brazil. He was subsequently invited by the Mocidade Samba School to participate in the next year's carnival. One of Paulinho's aunts is the television news commentator, Flávia Oliveira.

== Career statistics ==
=== Club ===
As of match played 26 July 2026

Appearances and goals by club, season and competition
Club	Season	League			State league (Note: Includes Campeonato Carioca, Campeonato Mineiro)		National cup (Note: Includes Copa do Brasil, DFB-Pokal)		Continental		Other		Total	
Club	Season	Division	Apps	Goals	Apps	Goals	Apps	Goals	Apps	Goals	Apps	Goals	Apps	Goals
Vasco da Gama	2017	Série A	18	3	—		—		—		—		18	3
Vasco da Gama	2018	Série A	0	0	11	2	0	0	6 (Note: Appearances in Copa Libertadores)	2	—		17	4
Vasco da Gama	Total		18	3	11	2	0	0	6	2	—		35	7
Bayer Leverkusen	2018–19	Bundesliga	15	0	—		2	0	4 (Note: Appearances in UEFA Europa League)	1	—		21	1
Bayer Leverkusen	2019–20	Bundesliga	13	3	—		2	0	4 (Note: Two appearances in UEFA Champions League, two appearances in UEFA Europa League)	0	—		19	3
Bayer Leverkusen	2020–21	Bundesliga	1	0	—		0	0	0	0	—		1	0
Bayer Leverkusen	2021–22	Bundesliga	24	4	—		1	0	6	0	—		31	4
Bayer Leverkusen	2022–23	Bundesliga	4	1	—		1	0	2 (Note: Appearances in UEFA Champions League)	0	—		7	1
Bayer Leverkusen	Total		57	8	—		6	0	16	1	—		79	9
Atlético Mineiro	2023	Série A	36	20	11	2	3	2	11	7	—		61	31
Atlético Mineiro	2024	Série A	26	8	11	2	10	2	12	7	—		59	19
Atlético Mineiro	Total		62	28	22	4	13	4	23	14	—		120	50
Palmeiras	2025	Série A	7	0	0	0	2	0	2	1	5 (Note: Appearances in FIFA Club World Cup)	2	16	3
Palmeiras	2026	Série A	6	2	0	0	0	0	3	0	—		9	2
Palmeiras	Total		13	2	0	0	2	0	5	0	5	2	25	4
Career total			150	41	33	6	21	4	50	18	5	2	259	70

=== International ===
As of match played 6 November 2023

Appearances and goals by national team and year
National team	Year	Apps	Goals
Brazil	2023	1	0
Total		1	0

== Honours ==
Atlético Mineiro

- Campeonato Mineiro: 2023, 2024

Palmeiras

- Campeonato Paulista: 2026

Brazil U15

- South American Under-15 Football Championship: 2015 Colombia

Brazil U17

- South American Under-17 Football Championship: 2017
- BRICS U-17 Football Cup: 2016
- FIFA U-17 World Cup Third place: 2017

Brazil U21

- Toulon Tournament: 2019

Brazil U23

- Summer Olympics gold medal: 2020

Individual

- Campeonato Brasileiro Série A top scorer: 2023
- Minas Gerais State Championship Team of the Year: 2023
- Campeonato Carioca MVP: 2018
- Campeonato Carioca Team of the Year: 2018
- Campeonato Carioca Best Young Player: 2018
- "Revelação do Campeonato Brasileiro 2017" in vote held by Esporte Interativo
- 60 of the best young talents in world football by The Guardian
- "30 Revelações do Brasileirão" by globoesporte.com
- "Abusado da Rodada" in the 16th round of the Brasileirão 2017 in vote held by É Gol!!! from SporTV
- "Pintura da Rodada" in the 16th round of the Brasileirão 2017 in vote held by É Gol!!! from SporTV
- "Abusado da Rodada" in the 4th round of the Campeonato Carioca 2018 in vote held by É Gol!!! from SporTV
- Best Player in the 1st match between Vasco da Gama x Jorge Wilstermann by the qualifying stage of the Libertadores 2018
- 2016 Montaigu Tournament top scorer: 4 goals
- 2017 U17 World Cup: 3 goals (Brazil's top scorer)

Records

- Youngest player to play for Vasco da Gama at the professional era (16 years, 11 months and 29 days)
- Youngest player to score a goal on Campeonato Brasileiro (17 years and 9 days)
- First player born in the 2000s to score a goal in Campeonato Brasileiro
- Vasco da Gama's youngest player to score in the Copa Libertadores (17 years, 6 months and 23 days)
- First player born in the 2000s to score a goal in Copa Libertadores
- First player born in the 2000s to score two goals in Copa Libertadores
- 4th youngest Brazilian player to score a goal in Copa Libertadores (19 February 2018)
