= Flávia Oliveira (journalist) =

Brazilian journalist (born 1969)

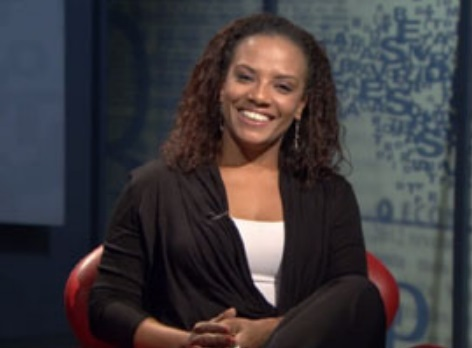
- Oliveira in 2014
- Born: 2 August 1969 (age 56); Irajá, Rio de Janeiro, Brazil
- Years active: 30
- Known for: Journalism on O Globo, GloboNews, and other media

Flávia Oliveira da Fraga (born 1969) is an Afro-Brazilian journalist who specialises in socioeconomic and financial matters with a particular attention to issues such as poverty, human development and social inequality. She has won many awards for her journalism.

== Early life and education ==
Flávia Oliveira was born on 2 August 1969 and raised by Ana Lúcia from Bahia state, in the Irajá neighbourhood in the North Zone of Rio de Janeiro. Her father left the home when she was seven and she would then live alone with her mother until she was 22. She studied statistics at the National School of Statistical Sciences (ENCE) and in 1992 graduated in journalism from the Institute of Arts and Social Communication (IACS) at the Fluminense Federal University (UFF), a distance of 45 kilometers from Irajá, which she partially covered by boat. She interned at a suburban newspaper in Duque de Caxias, Rio de Janeiro.

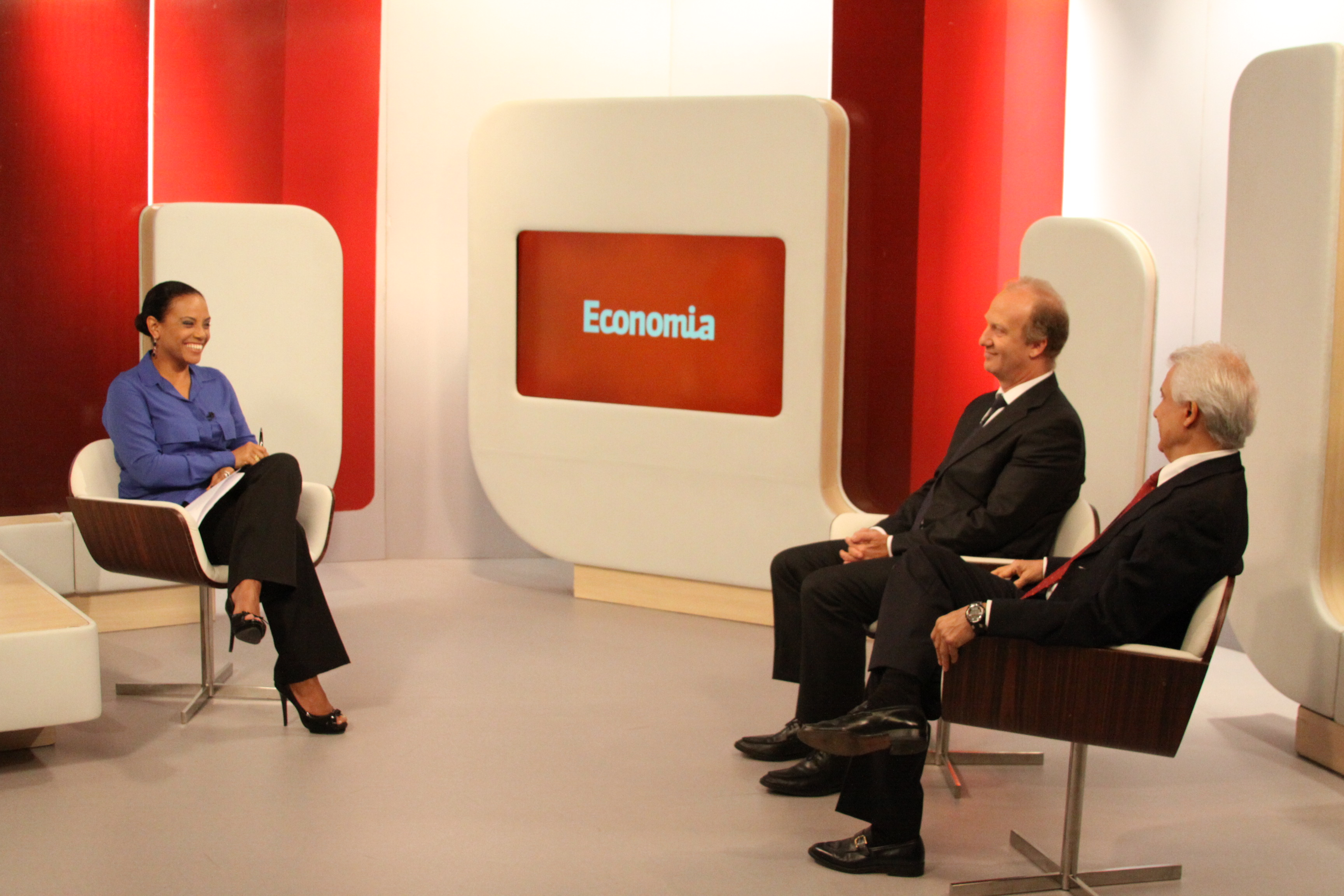
Oliveira presenting a programme on GloboNews

== Career ==
Oliveira began her career in 1992, as a reporter for the now-defunct Jornal do Commercio. She then moved to the Rio-based newspaper O Globo, where she worked as an economics reporter from 1994 to 2000, as editor of special supplements from 2001 to 2005 and started producing the paper's Negócios & Cia column from August 2006. Since 2009, she has also been one of the regular commentators on the Estúdio i programme, on the GloboNews subscription television channel, where she comments on economics, politics and culture. In April 2011, she also became a commentator on personal finance and home economics on Bom Dia Rio on the channel RJTV of TV Globo Rio, a role she held until the second half of the decade.

Continuing to specialize in covering socioeconomic topics, such as poverty, human development and social inequality, as well as home economics and personal finance, Oliveira remains a columnist for O Globo, contributing to the Panorama Econômico column, headed by Miriam Leitão, and the editorial columns Opinião editorial. She has been a commentator on the programmes Em Pauta and Jornal das Dez on GloboNews since June 2020, and on the radio station Central Brasileira de Notícias since 2019. On 3 June 2020 she was one of six black journalists, including five women, presenting the Em Pauta programme, believed to be the first time on Brazilian TV where all the presenters were black. She has also worked for shows on Canal Brasil and Canal Viva. Together with her daughter, Isabela Reis, she produces a podcast called Angu de Grilo. She has also done a monthly blog on the website of PayPal Brasil to discuss financial education, entrepreneurship and consumer trends. A grandmother, following the birth of a son to Isabela Reis, she also contributed to a podcast about being a grandmother.

Oliveira was a member of the O Globo team that covered the results of the 2022 Brazilian general election. She is seen as a pioneer by many of the younger Afro-Brazilians now in the media industry.

Oliveira has also undertaken voluntary work as the member of the boards of several non-governmental organizations, such as the Centre for the Study of Labour Relations and Inequalities; Amnesty International Brasil; the Observatório de Favelas (Favelas Observatory); and the Instituto Coca-Cola Brasil.

== Awards ==
In 2001, Oliveira received the ExxonMobil Journalism Award, in the Best Contribution to the Press category, for a series of reports called Retratos do Rio (Portraits of Rio). In 2002 she received the Fiat Allis Award for Economic Journalism and the Imprensa Embratel award for her work on the Pirataria S/A section of O Globo, together with Nelson Vasconcelos. In 2003, she received the Imprensa Embratel award, for her work on Digital Exclusion, also together with Vasconcelos. In the same year, the International Federation of Journalists (IFJ) awarded her the Journalism for Tolerance Award, for her work as co-editor of the supplement A Cor do Brasil, in O Globo. Also in 2003, she received the Elizabeth Neuffer Award from the UN Correspondents' Association, for a series of reports on human development, together with fellow journalist Luciana Rodrigues. She was chosen as one of the Top 10 most admired reporters on the Brazilian economy, business and finance sector in 2016. In November 2023, she was made an Officer of the Order of Rio Branco for services to Brazil.

== Personal life ==
Oliveira has been married twice. She is aunt to the Brazilian footballer Paulinho.
