= Rodrigo Pimpão =

Brazilian footballer (born 1987)

Personal information
- Full name: Rodrigo Pimpão Vianna
- Date of birth: 23 October 1987 (age 39)
- Place of birth: Curitiba, Brazil
- Height: 1.78 m (5 ft 10 in)
- Position: Forward

Youth career
- 2007: Paraná

Senior career*
Years	Team	Apps	(Gls)
2008	Paraná	11	(2)
2008	→ Blumenau (loan)		
2009–2012	Vasco da Gama	8	(1)
2010	→ Paraná (loan)	15	(6)
2011	→ Cerezo Osaka (loan)	11	(3)
2011	→ Omiya Ardija (loan)	9	(1)
2012	→ Ponte Preta (loan)	2	(0)
2012	→ América Mineiro (loan)	12	(2)
2013	Suwon Samsung Bluewings	1	(0)
2013	América-RN	28	(5)
2014	Tractor Sazi	5	(0)
2014	América-RN	34	(14)
2015	Botafogo	12	(7)
2015–2016	Emirates Club	21	(1)
2016–2019	Botafogo	105	(6)
2020–2021	CSA	66	(12)
2021–2022	Operário Ferroviário	43	(3)
2022	Remo	7	(1)
2023	Marcílio Dias (SC)	8	(0)
- * Club domestic league appearances and goals as of 29 May 2022

Rodrigo Pimpão Vianna (born 23 October 1987), known as Rodrigo Pimpão, is a Brazilian footballer who plays as a forward.

== Career statistics ==
As of match played 27 August 2022

Appearances and goals by club, season and competition
Club	Season	League			State League		Cup		League Cup		Continental		Other		Total	
Club	Season	Division	Apps	Goals	Apps	Goals	Apps	Goals	Apps	Goals	Apps	Goals	Apps	Goals	Apps	Goals
Paraná	2008	Série B	11	2	—		1	0	—		—		—		12	2
Vasco da Gama	2009	Série B	8	1	16	6	9	3	—		—		—		33	10
Vasco da Gama	2010	Série A	—		5	0	3	0	—		—		—		8	0
Vasco da Gama	Total		8	1	21	6	12	3	—		—		—		41	10
Paraná (loan)	2010	Série B	15	6	—		—		—		—		—		15	6
Cerezo Osaka (loan)	2011	J.League Division 1	14	4	—		—		—		7	4	—		21	8
Omiya Ardija (loan)	2011	J.League Division 1	9	1	—		0	0	2	0	—		—		11	1
Ponte Preta (loan)	2012	Série A	2	0	17	5	5	1	—		—		—		24	6
América Mineiro (loan)	2012	Série B	12	2	—		—		—		—		—		12	2
Suwon Samsung Bluewings	2013	K League Classic	1	0	—		0	0	—		2	0	—		3	0
América-RN	2013	Série B	28	5	—		—		—		—		—		28	5
Tractor Sazi	2013–14	Iran Pro League	5	0	—		2	0	—		0	0	—		7	0
América-RN	2014	Série B	34	15	7	2	9	3	—		—		—		50	20
Botafogo	2015	Série B	12	7	10	2	3	0	—		—		—		25	9
Emirates Club	2015–16	UAE Pro League	21	1	—				4	2	—		—		25	3
Botafogo	2016	Série A	23	3	—		2	0	—		—		—		25	3
Botafogo	2017	Série A	32	2	7	0	5	0	—		13	5	—		57	7
Botafogo	2018	Série A	31	1	17	1	1	1	—		6	3	—		55	6
Botafogo	2019	Série A	19	0	8	1	4	2	—		3	9	—		34	3
Botafogo	Total		105	6	32	2	12	3	—		22	8	—		171	19
CSA	2020	Série B	32	5	9	5	1	0	—		—		7	0	49	10
CSA	2021	Série B	—		5	1	2	1	—		—		5	1	12	3
CSA	Total		32	5	14	6	3	1	—		—		12	1	61	13
Operário Ferroviário	2021	Série B	32	2	—		1	0	—		—		—		33	2
Operário Ferroviário	2022	Série B	—		10	1	—		—		—		—		10	1
Operário Ferroviário	Total		32	2	10	1	1	0	—		—		—		43	3
Remo	2022	Série C	11	1	—		—		—		—		—		11	1
Marcílio Dias (SC)	2023	Catarinense	—		8	0	—		—		—		—		8	0
Career total			352	58	119	24	48	11	6	2	31	12	12	1	568	108

== Honours ==
Vasco da Gama

- Campeonato Brasileiro Série B: 2009

Tractor Sazi

- Hazfi Cup: 2013–14

Botafogo

- Campeonato Brasileiro Série B: 2015
- Campeonato Carioca: 2018

CSA

- Campeonato Alagoano: 2021
