= Rafinha (footballer, born July 1993) =

Brazilian footballer

Personal information
- Full name: Rafael Gimenes da Silva
- Date of birth: 5 July 1993 (age 33)
- Place of birth: Rio de Janeiro, Brazil
- Height: 1.77 m (5 ft 9 1/2 in)
- Position: Defensive midfielder

Team information
- Current team: Pérolas Negras

Youth career
- Fluminense

Senior career*
Years	Team	Apps	(Gls)
2012–2017	Fluminense	40	(0)
2016	→ Avaí (loan)	8	(0)
2017	→ Macaé (loan)	9	(1)
2018	Madureira	6	(1)
2019–2021	Kalmar FF	20	(0)
2021	Intubiara	3	(0)
2021–2022	Madureira	20	(1)
2022	Gonçalense		
2022–2023	Madureira	10	(0)
2023	America-RJ		
2023–	Pérolas Negras		
- * Club domestic league appearances and goals as of 9 March 2023

Rafael Gimenes da Silva (born 5 July 1993), commonly known as Rafinha, is a Brazilian footballer who plays as a defensive midfielder for Pérolas Negras.

== Career ==
=== Kalmar FF ===
On 18 January 2019, Rafinha moved to Sweden and signed with Kalmar FF until 2022.

=== Return to Madureira ===
On 2 June 2021, Rafinha returned to Madureira.
