= Ricardo Graça =

Brazilian footballer

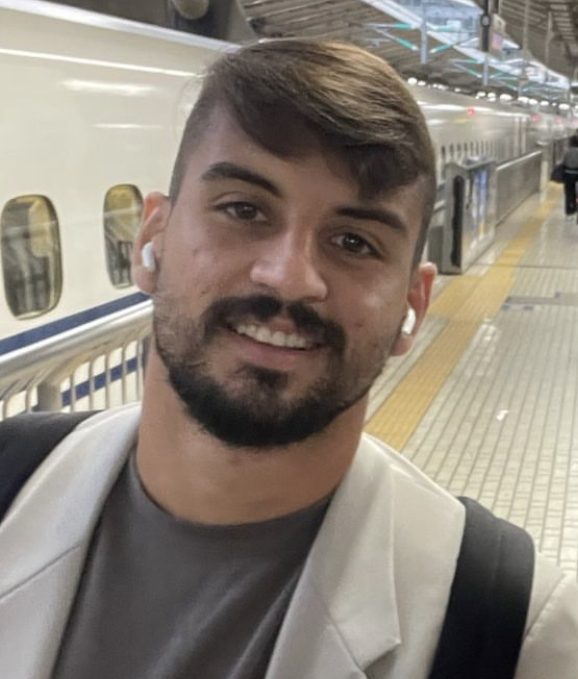
- Graça in 2023

Personal information
- Full name: Ricardo Queiroz de Alencastro Graça
- Date of birth: 16 February 1997 (age 29)
- Place of birth: Rio de Janeiro, Brazil
- Height: 1.82 m (6 ft 0 in)
- Position: Centre-back

Team information
- Current team: Júbilo Iwata
- Number: 36

Youth career
- 2010–2017: Vasco da Gama
- 2016: → Vitória de Guimarães (loan)

Senior career*
Years	Team	Apps	(Gls)
2018–2021	Vasco da Gama	94	(4)
2022–	Júbilo Iwata	117	(5)

International career^{‡}
2020–2021	Brazil U23	3	(0)
Medal record
Men's football
Representing Brazil
Olympic Games
Gold medal – first place	2020 Tokyo	Team
- * Club domestic league appearances and goals as of 1 January 2026 ‡ National team caps and goals as of 15 July 2021

Ricardo Queiroz de Alencastro Graça (born 16 February 1997), known as Ricardo Graça, is a Brazilian professional footballer who plays for Júbilo Iwata as a centre-back.

== Career statistics ==
As of match played 6 December 2025

Appearances and goals by club, season and competition
Club	Season	League			State league		Cup		League cup		Continental		Other		Total	
Club	Season	Division	Apps	Goals	Apps	Goals	Apps	Goals	Apps	Goals	Apps	Goals	Apps	Goals	Apps	Goals
Vasco da Gama	2017	Série A	0	0	—		—		—		—		—		0	0
Vasco da Gama	2018	Série A	13	0	6	0	1	0	—		6 (Note: Four appearances in Copa Libertadores and two appearances in Copa Sudamericana)	0	—		26	0
Vasco da Gama	2019	Série A	18	1	4	0	3	1	—		—		—		25	1
Vasco da Gama	2020	Série A	21	2	3	0	1	0	—		2 (Note: Two appearances in Copa Sudamericana)	0	—		27	2
Vasco da Gama	2021	Série B	19	1	10	0	4	0	—		—		—		33	1
Vasco da Gama	Total		71	4	23	0	9	1	—		8	0	—		111	5
Júbilo Iwata	2022	J1 League	22	0	—		0	0	1	0	—		—		23	0
Júbilo Iwata	2023	J2 League	35	2	—		0	0	3	0	—		—		38	2
Júbilo Iwata	2024	J2 League	33	1	—		0	0	0	0	—		—		33	1
Júbilo Iwata	2025	J2 League	27	2	—		0	0	4	1	—		1	0	32	3
Júbilo Iwata	Total		117	5	—		0	0	8	1	—		1	0	126	6
Career total			188	9	23	0	9	1	8	1	8	0	1	0	237	11

== Honours ==
Brazil Olympic

- Summer Olympics: 2020

Individual

- J2 League Best XI: 2023
