= Ronald de la Fuente =

Chilean footballer (born 1991)

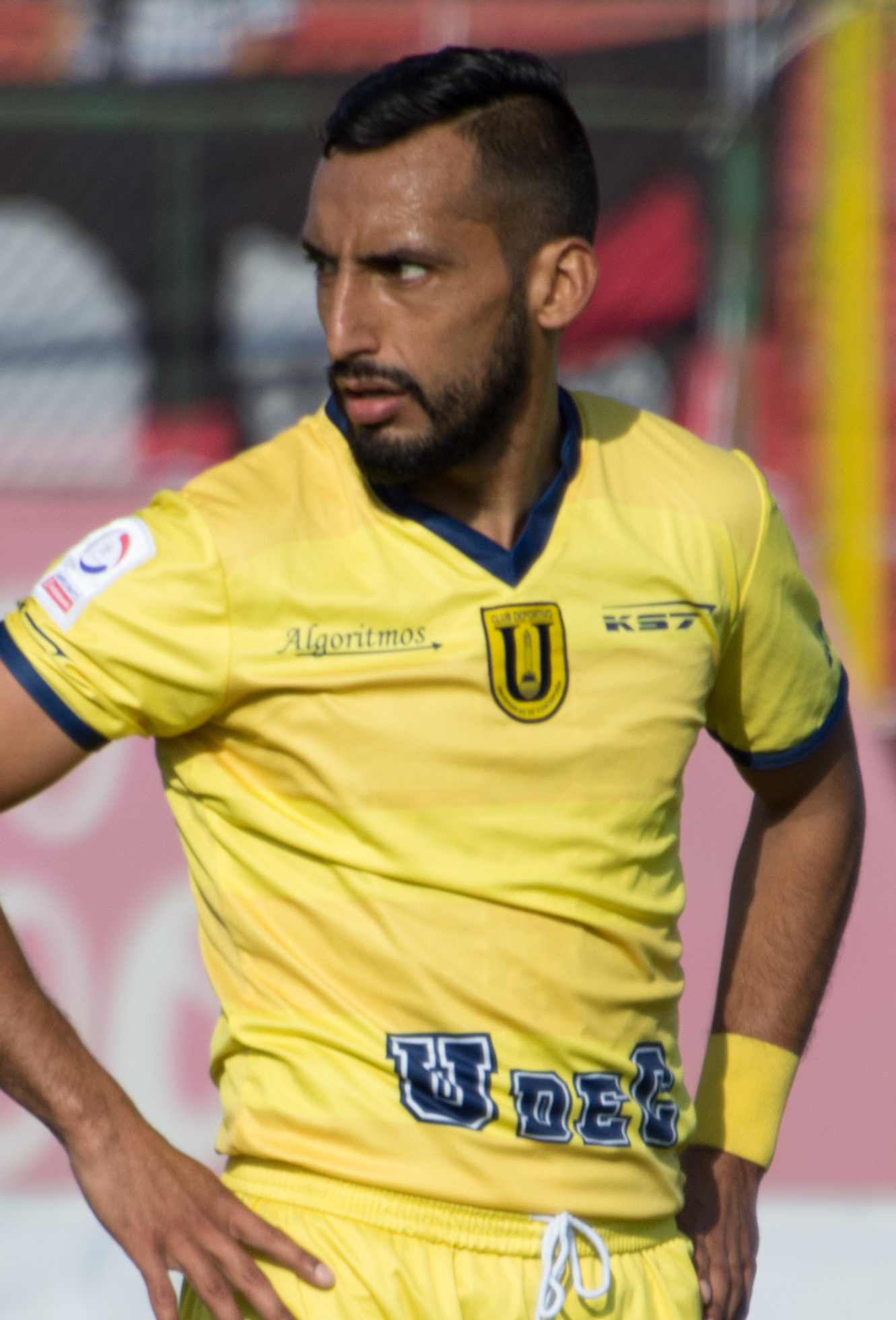
- de la Fuente with Universidad de Concepción in 2018

Personal information
- Full name: Ronald Vladimir de la Fuente Arias
- Date of birth: January 25, 1991 (age 35)
- Place of birth: Talcahuano, Chile
- Height: 1.70 m (5 ft 7 in)
- Position: Defender

Youth career
- Huachipato

Senior career*
Years	Team	Apps	(Gls)
2011–2015	Huachipato	8	(0)
2013	→ San Marcos (loan)	3	(0)
2013–2015	→ Iberia (loan)	41	(2)
2015–2018	Universidad de Concepción	86	(3)
2019–	Colo-Colo	25	(0)
2021	→ Curicó Unido (loan)	31	(0)
2022–2023	Curicó Unido	46	(0)
2024	Deportes Iquique	13	(0)
2025–2026	Curicó Unido	45	(1)
- * Club domestic league appearances and goals as of 13 November 2026

Ronald Vladimir de la Fuente Arias (born January 25, 1991) is a Chilean footballer who plays as a defender.

== Career ==
De la Fuente was born in Talcahuano, where he began his football career with Huachipato. He made a few appearances in the 2011 Clausura and the 2012 Apertura before joining another Primera División club, San Marcos de Arica, on loan. He made only three appearances in the 2013 Transición before making another loan move, to Segunda División (third-tier) club Iberia, under the management of Ronald Fuentes. He started 18 matches as Iberia won the 2013–14 title, before returning to his parent club for whom he made three appearances in the group stages of the Copa Chile. De la Fuente rejoined Iberia for the 2014–15 season, but injury prevented his playing as much as he would have liked.

After Fuentes took over as manager of Primera División club Universidad de Concepción, he signed De la Fuente. He made 11 appearances in the 2015 Apertura and 9 in that season's Copa Chile, helping his team reach the semifinals, as well as appearing on the losing side in the 2015 Supercopa. Although he played little in the Clausura, he established himself in the starting eleven the following season, and his performances attracted attention from other clubs. In early 2018, De la Fuente played in the Copa Libertadores for Universidad de Concepción against Vasco da Gama of Brazil: despite a 4–0 defeat in the first leg, he felt the tie was not over, but, at 2–0 down in the return leg, he was sent off for kicking an opponent in the groin.

In 2024, he joined Deportes Iquique. He returned to Curicó Unido for 2025 and 2026.

== Personal life ==
He began to study law in the context of COVID-19 pandemic, but he had to suspend due to the fact that the university changed the course to in-person mode. So, he began to study at the INAF (National Football Institute).

== Honours ==
Huachipato

- Primera División: 2012–C

Deportes Iberia

- Segunda División de Chile: 2013–14

Colo-Colo

- Copa Chile: 2019
