= Renatinho (footballer, born 1992) =

Brazilian footballer

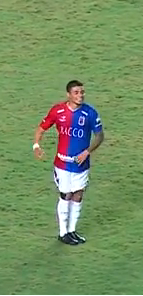
- Renatinho during a Primeira Liga match against Flamengo in 2017

Personal information
- Full name: Renato Vieira Rodrigues
- Date of birth: 31 January 1992 (age 34)
- Place of birth: Foz do Iguaçu, Brazil
- Height: 1.72 m (5 ft 7 1/2 in)
- Position: Midfielder

Team information
- Current team: Itabaiana

Senior career*
| Years | Team | Apps | (Gls) |
| 2012–2014 | Atlético Paranaense | 3 | (0) |
| 2014 | → Ferroviária (loan) | 5 | (1) |
| 2015 | Foz do Iguaçu | 12 | (5) |
| 2015 | Campinense | | |
| 2015 | Operário Ferroviário | 5 | (0) |
| 2016–2021 | Mirassol | 22 | (4) |
| 2016 | → Guarani (loan) | 6 | (1) |
| 2017 | → Paraná (loan) | 54 | (18) |
| 2018 | → Botafogo (loan) | 31 | (1) |
| 2019 | → Goiás (loan) | 25 | (10) |
| 2020 | → CSA (loan) | 14 | (1) |
| 2020–2021 | → Avaí (loan) | 10 | (0) |
| 2021 | Botafogo-SP | 10 | (0) |
| 2021 | GE Brasil | 20 | (3) |
| 2022 | Barra | 10 | (1) |
| 2022 | Sampaio Corrêa | 28 | (2) |
| 2023 | Botafogo-PB | 30 | (4) |
| 2024–2026 | Primavera | 43 | (6) |
| 2026– | Itabaiana | 15 | (1) |
- * Club domestic league appearances and goals as of 11 November 2026

Renato Vieira Rodrigues (born 31 January 1992), commonly known as Renatinho is a Brazilian footballer who plays for Itabaiana as a midfielder.

== Club career ==
Born in Foz do Iguaçu, Renatinho is a graduate of the youth academy of Atlético Paranaense and was promoted to the senior team in 2012. He spent the following years; initially at loan to Ferroviária and then had successive stints at Foz do Iguaçu, Campinense and at Mirassol. He was a part of the Mirassol squad which finished runners-up in the Campeonato Paulista Série A2 where he scored four goals in 22 matches.

On 15 July 2016, Renatinho joined Guarani. In the following January, he joined Série B club Paraná on loan. After having ended the Campeonato Paranaense as the club's top scorer, he scored his first goal for the club in Série B in a 2–0 victory over Goiás on 17 May. He contributed with 18 goals in 54 matches, ending the season as the club's top scorer.

Although Renatinho received offers from Chinese, Japanese and Brazilian clubs (Vasco da Gama, Bahia, Vitória), he joined Botafogo on a year long loan deal on 10 January 2018. On 21 December, left the club.

On 4 January 2019, Renatinho signed for Goiás.

== Honours ==
=== Club ===
Botafogo

- Campeonato Carioca: 2018
