= Giovanni Augusto =

Brazilian footballer (born 1989)

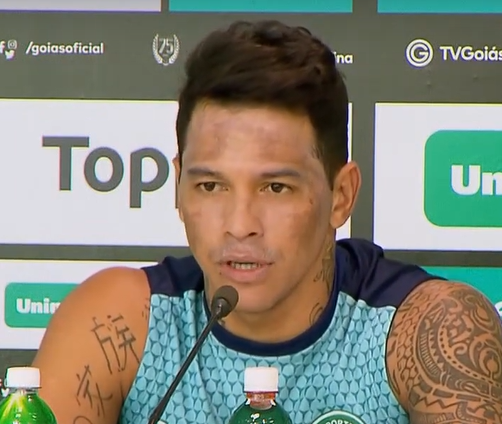
- Giovanni Augusto in 2019

Personal information
- Full name: Giovanni Augusto Oliveira Cardoso
- Date of birth: 5 September 1989 (age 37)
- Place of birth: Belém, Brazil
- Height: 1.77 m (5 ft 9 1/2 in)
- Position: Attacking midfielder

Team information
- Current team: Chapecoense
- Number: 10

Youth career
- 2005–2008: Paysandu
- 2008–2010: Atlético Mineiro

Senior career*
| Years | Team | Apps | (Gls) |
| 2010–2016 | Atlético Mineiro | 51 | (6) |
| 2010 | → Náutico (loan) | 22 | (2) |
| 2011 | → Grêmio Barueri (loan) | 10 | (0) |
| 2012 | → Criciúma (loan) | 27 | (3) |
| 2013 | → Náutico (loan) | 12 | (3) |
| 2013 | → ABC (loan) | 13 | (2) |
| 2014 | → Figueirense (loan) | 35 | (5) |
| 2016–2019 | Corinthians | 56 | (6) |
| 2018 | → Vasco da Gama (loan) | 22 | (1) |
| 2019 | → Goiás (loan) | 17 | (0) |
| 2020–2021 | Coritiba | 25 | (4) |
| 2021 | Mazatlán | 29 | (5) |
| 2022–2023 | Guarani | 49 | (6) |
| 2023 | Vitória | 20 | (1) |
| 2024 | Portuguesa | 12 | (2) |
| 2024– | Chapecoense | 86 | (3) |
- * Club domestic league appearances and goals as of 9 April 2026

Giovanni Augusto Oliveira Cardoso (born 5 September 1989), known as Giovanni Augusto, is a Brazilian professional footballer who plays as an attacking midfielder for Chapecoense.

== Club career ==
=== Atlético Mineiro and loans ===
Born in Belém, Pará, Giovanni Augusto graduated from Atlético Mineiro's youth setup. He made his first team debut on 17 March 2010, coming on as a second half substitute in a 0–1 away loss against Chapecoense, for that year's Copa do Brasil.

After appearing rarely, Giovanni Augusto was loaned to Náutico in May 2010. He returned to Galo in 2011, but spent the following campaigns out on loan to Grêmio Barueri, Criciúma, Náutico, ABC and Figueirense.

With Figueira Giovanni Augusto appeared regularly in Série A, avoiding relegation and scoring four goals in 24 appearances. He also scored the first official goal of Arena Corinthians on 18 May 2014, in a 1–1 draw against Corinthians.

Giovanni Augusto only established himself as a starter for Galo during the 2015 campaign, under Levir Culpi. On 5 May he renewed his contract until 2018, and finished the year with five goals and ten assists.

=== Corinthians ===
On 4 February 2016, it was announced that Giovanni signed with Corinthians for an undisclosed fee. A regular starter during his first year, he lost space during the 2017 season.

On 8 February 2018, Giovanni Augusto was loaned to Vasco da Gama until the end of the year. In March 2019, he joined Goiás on loan until the end of the season.

=== Coritiba ===
On 29 January 2020, free agent Giovanni Augusto joined Coritiba. On 28 May, his contract was extended until the end of the year.

In November 2020, after the season calendar was extended until February 2021 due to the COVID-19 pandemic, Giovanni Augusto further extended his link with Coxa until that month; on 5 January 2021, however, he left the club after receiving an offer from abroad.

=== Mazatlán ===
On 11 January 2021, Giovanni Augusto was announced at Liga MX side Mazatlán for an undisclosed fee. Despite being regularly used, he was one of the four players released on 28 November.

=== Guarani ===
On 12 January 2022, Giovanni Augusto returned to his home country after being announced at Guarani in the second division. On 1 April, after establishing himself as a regular starter, he renewed his contract for a further year.

On 31 March 2023, amidst negotiations to play for fellow second level side Vitória, Giovanni Augusto rescinded with Bugre.

=== Vitória ===
On 5 April 2023, Giovanni Augusto was presented at Vitória. He featured sparingly as the club achieved promotion to the top tier as champions, but did not have his contract renewed.

=== Portuguesa and Chapecoense ===
On 3 January 2024, Giovanni Augusto was announced at Portuguesa for the 2024 Campeonato Paulista. He helped the club to reach the quarterfinals for the first time in 13 years, before joining Chapecoense on 2 April.

== Career statistics ==
As of 18 March 2024.

| Club | Season | League | | | State League | | Cup | | Continental | | Other | | Total | |
| Club | Season | Division | Apps | Goals | Apps | Goals | Apps | Goals | Apps | Goals | Apps | Goals | Apps | Goals |
|---|---|---|---|---|---|---|---|---|---|---|---|---|---|---|
| Atlético Mineiro | 2010 | Série A | 0 | 0 | 1 | 0 | 1 | 0 | — | | — | | 2 | 0 |
| Atlético Mineiro | 2011 | Série A | 10 | 0 | 4 | 0 | 0 | 0 | 0 | 0 | — | | 14 | 0 |
| Atlético Mineiro | 2015 | Série A | 35 | 5 | 1 | 0 | 2 | 0 | 2 (Note: Appearance(s) in Copa Libertadores) | 0 | — | | 40 | 5 |
| Atlético Mineiro | 2016 | Série A | 0 | 0 | 0 | 0 | 0 | 0 | 0 | 0 | 1 (Note: Appearance(s) in Primeira Liga) | 0 | 1 | 0 |
| Atlético Mineiro | Subtotal | | 45 | 5 | 6 | 0 | 3 | 0 | 2 | 0 | 1 | 0 | 57 | 5 |
| Náutico (loan) | 2010 | Série B | 22 | 2 | — | | — | | — | | 4 (Note: Appearance(s) in Copa do Nordeste) | 1 | 26 | 3 |
| Grêmio Barueri (loan) | 2011 | Série B | 10 | 0 | — | | — | | — | | — | | 10 | 0 |
| Criciúma (loan) | 2012 | Série B | 27 | 3 | — | | — | | — | | — | | 26 | 3 |
| Náutico (loan) | 2013 | Série A | 0 | 0 | 12 | 3 | 2 | 0 | — | | — | | 14 | 4 |
| ABC (loan) | 2013 | Série B | 13 | 2 | — | | — | | — | | — | | 13 | 2 |
| Figueirense (loan) | 2014 | Série A | 24 | 4 | 11 | 1 | 1 | 1 | — | | — | | 36 | 6 |
| Corinthians | 2016 | Série A | 32 | 3 | 11 | 2 | 4 | 0 | 6 | 1 | — | | 53 | 6 |
| Corinthians | 2017 | Série A | 11 | 1 | 2 | 0 | 4 | 0 | 4 (Note: Appearance(s) in Copa Sudamericana) | 0 | — | | 21 | 1 |
| Corinthians | Subtotal | | 43 | 4 | 13 | 2 | 8 | 0 | 10 | 1 | — | | 74 | 7 |
| Vasco da Gama (loan) | 2018 | Série A | 19 | 0 | 3 | 1 | 1 | 0 | 2 | 0 | — | | 25 | 1 |
| Goiás (loan) | 2019 | Série A | 12 | 0 | 5 | 0 | 0 | 0 | — | | — | | 17 | 0 |
| Coritiba | 2020 | Série A | 20 | 4 | 5 | 0 | 0 | 0 | — | | — | | 25 | 4 |
| Mazatlán | 2020–21 | Liga MX | 15 | 3 | — | | 0 | 0 | — | | — | | 15 | 3 |
| Mazatlán | 2021–22 | Liga MX | 14 | 2 | — | | 0 | 0 | — | | — | | 14 | 2 |
| Mazatlán | Subtotal | | 29 | 5 | — | | 0 | 0 | — | | — | | 29 | 5 |
| Guarani | 2022 | Série B | 27 | 2 | 13 | 3 | 2 | 2 | — | | — | | 42 | 7 |
| Guarani | 2023 | Série B | 0 | 0 | 9 | 1 | — | | — | | — | | 9 | 1 |
| Guarani | Subtotal | | 27 | 2 | 22 | 4 | 2 | 2 | — | | — | | 51 | 8 |
| Vitória | 2023 | Série B | 20 | 1 | — | | — | | — | | — | | 20 | 1 |
| Portuguesa | 2024 | Paulista | — | | 12 | 2 | — | | — | | — | | 12 | 2 |
| Career total | | | 280 | 27 | 89 | 13 | 17 | 3 | 14 | 1 | 7 | 1 | 408 | 45 |

== Honours ==
Atlético Mineiro

- Campeonato Mineiro: 2010, 2015

Figueirense

- Campeonato Catarinense: 2014

Corinthians

- Campeonato Brasileiro Série A: 2017
- Campeonato Paulista: 2017

Vitória

- Campeonato Brasileiro Série B: 2023
