= Henrique (footballer, born 1994) =

Brazilian footballer (born 1994)

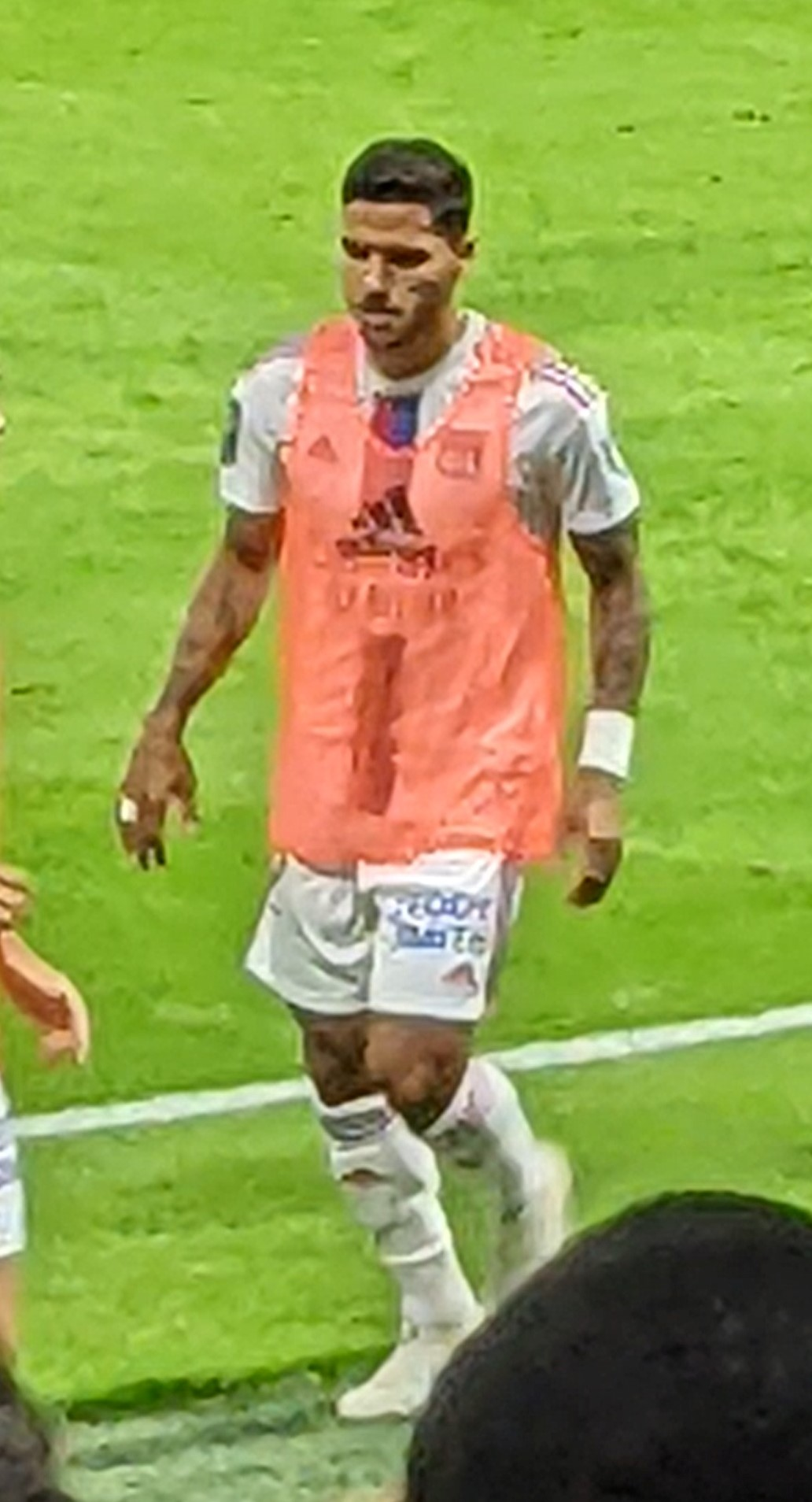
- Henrique with Lyon in 2022

Personal information
- Full name: Henrique Silva Milagres
- Date of birth: 25 April 1994 (age 32)
- Place of birth: Rio de Janeiro, Brazil
- Height: 1.73 m (5 ft 8 in)
- Position: Left-back

Team information
- Current team: Turan Tovuz
- Number: 3

Youth career
- 2003–2013: Vasco da Gama

Senior career*
Years	Team	Apps	(Gls)
2013–2021	Vasco da Gama	192	(1)
2021–2024	Lyon	36	(1)
2021	Lyon B	1	(0)
2025	Valladolid	5	(0)
2025–	Turan Tovuz	24	(0)

International career
2014	Brazil U20	2	(0)
- * Club domestic league appearances and goals as of 22 June 2026

Henrique Silva Milagres (born 25 April 1994), commonly known as Henrique, is a Brazilian professional footballer who plays as a left-back for Azerbaijan Premier League club Turan Tovuz.

== Career ==
=== Vasco da Gama ===
Henrique joined Vasco da Gama in 2003. He played for the club's senior side from 2013 to 2021, making a total of 192 appearances and scoring 1 goal across all competitions.

=== Lyon ===
On 29 June 2021, Henrique signed a three-year contract with Ligue 1 club Lyon.

== Career statistics ==
As of match played 12 July 2025

Appearances and goals by club, season and competition
Club	Season	League			State league		Cup		Continental		Other		Total	
Club	Season	Division	Apps	Goals	Apps	Goals	Apps	Goals	Apps	Goals	Apps	Goals	Apps	Goals
Vasco da Gama	2013	Série A	11	0	0	0	1	0	—		—		12	0
Vasco da Gama	2014	Série B	1	0	3	0	0	0	—		—		4	0
Vasco da Gama	2015	Série A	0	0	0	0	2	0	—		—		2	0
Vasco da Gama	2016	Série B	11	0	3	0	3	0	—		—		17	0
Vasco da Gama	2017	Série A	21	0	12	0	3	0	—		—		36	0
Vasco da Gama	2018	Série A	24	0	9	0	2	0	9 (Note: Eight appearances in Copa Libertadores, one appearance in Copa Sudamericana)	0	—		44	0
Vasco da Gama	2019	Série A	21	0	3	0	0	0	—		—		24	0
Vasco da Gama	2020	Série A	29	0	8	0	6	1	3 (Note: Appearances in Copa Sudamericana)	0	—		46	0
Vasco da Gama	Total		118	0	38	0	17	1	12	0	—		175	0
Lyon	2021–22	Ligue 1	18	0	—		0	0	4 (Note: Appearances in UEFA Europa League)	0	—		22	0
Lyon	2022–23	Ligue 1	7	0	—		3	0	—		—		10	0
Lyon	2023–24	Ligue 1	11	1	—		2	0	—		—		13	1
Lyon	Total		36	1	—		5	0	4	0	—		45	1
Lyon B	2021–22	CFA 2	1	0	—		—		—		—		1	0
Real Valladolid	2024–25	LaLiga	5	0	—		0	0	—		—		5	0
Career total			160	1	38	0	22	1	16	0	0	0	226	2

== Honours ==
Lyon

- Coupe de France runner-up: 2023–24
