= Leandro Desábato (footballer, born 1990) =

Argentine footballer

Personal information
- Full name: Leandro Luis Desábato
- Date of birth: 30 March 1990 (age 36)
- Place of birth: Murphy, Argentina
- Height: 1.78 m (5 ft 10 in)
- Position: Defensive midfielder

Team information
- Current team: San Miguel

Youth career
- Unión y Cultura
- Renato Cesarini
- –2010: Vélez Sarsfield

Senior career*
Years	Team	Apps	(Gls)
2011–2017	Vélez Sarsfield	123	(3)
2018	Vasco da Gama	27	(0)
2019–2021	Cerezo Osaka	42	(0)
2021–2022	Rosario Central	6	(0)
2022	Vegalta Sendai	13	(0)
2023	Rotonda Calcio	9	(0)
2024	CSM Alexandria	9	(0)
2025–2026	All Boys	16	(0)
2026–	San Miguel	10	(0)
- * Club domestic league appearances and goals as of 17:58, 5 May 2026 (UTC)

Leandro Luis Desábato (born 30 March 1990) is an Argentine footballer who plays as a midfielder for Primera Nacional club San Miguel.

== Career ==
Desábato started his professional career playing for Vélez Sarsfield entering the field in a 1–0 victory over Lanús for the 2010 Clausura tournament. Leandro was part of the squads that won the 2011 Clausura (playing three games), the 2012 Inicial (playing two games), the 2012–13 Superfinal and the 2013 Supercopa Argentina. He scored his first goal for the team in a 4–1 victory against Atlético de Rafaela, on 23 September 2013.

== Personal life ==
He is the twin brother of Andrés Desábato and cousin of Leandro Desábato, both of whom are also professional footballers.

== Honours ==
Vélez Sarsfield

- Argentine Primera División: 2011 Clausura, 2012 Inicial, 2012–13 Superfinal
- Supercopa Argentina: 2013

Vasco da Gama

- Campeonato Carioca runner-up: 2018

Individual

- Campeonato Carioca Team of the year: 2018
