= Marcinho (footballer, born 1996) =

Brazilian footballer

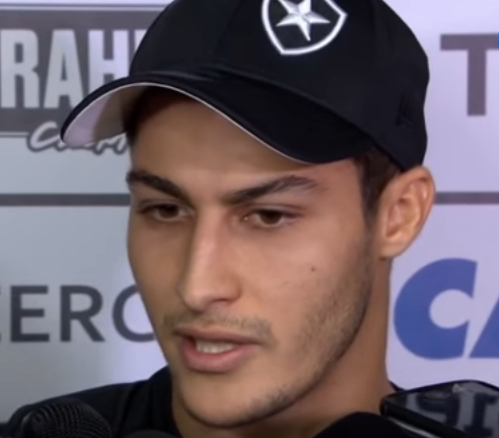
- Marcinho in 2018

Personal information
- Full name: Márcio Almeida de Oliveira
- Date of birth: 16 May 1996 (age 30)
- Place of birth: Rio de Janeiro, Brazil
- Height: 1.78 m (5 ft 10 in)
- Position: Right back

Team information
- Current team: Criciúma
- Number: 6

Youth career
- Fluminense

Senior career*
Years	Team	Apps	(Gls)
2016–2021	Botafogo	107	(2)
2021–2022	Athletico Paranaense	57	(2)
2022–2024	Pafos	0	(0)
2022	→ Bahia (loan)	14	(0)
2023	→ América Mineiro (loan)	16	(0)
2024	→ Rodina Moscow (loan)	9	(0)
2024	Ituano	22	(0)
2025	Atlético Goianiense	12	(0)
2025–	Criciúma	45	(2)
- * Club domestic league appearances and goals as of 15 April 2026

Márcio Almeida de Oliveira (born 16 May 1996), commonly known as Marcinho, is a Brazilian professional footballer who plays as a right back for Criciúma.

== Club career ==
=== Botafogo ===
Born in Rio de Janeiro, Marcinho is a graduate of the youth academy of Fluminense. Although originally a midfielder, he switched to right back position ahead of the 2016 season. In the same year, he was promoted to the senior team. On 2 February, he made his first team debut in a 2–1 victory against Portuguesa RJ. On 1 March, his contract was extended till December 2018.

Marcinho could not play for the most of 2017 season due to an injury. At the beginning of the 2018 season, he became the first choice right-back of the club after the appointment of Alberto Valentim as the manager. With the club, he went on to win the 2018 Campeonato Carioca and scored during the penalty shootout in the final against Vasco da Gama. On 10 April, he contract was extended until the end of 2020.

=== Athletico Paranaense ===
On 28 March 2021, free agent Marcinho agreed to a one-year contract with Athletico Paranaense.

=== Pafos FC ===
On 25 June 2022, Pafos FC announced the signing of Marcinho on a free transfer.

== International career ==
In September 2019 he was called up to the senior Brazil squad for a friendly match against Nigeria.

== Personal life ==
On 30 December 2020, Marcinho became the author of a hit-and-run which resulted in the death of a couple in the Sernambetiba Avenue, Rio de Janeiro. He was driving above the speed limit, left without providing immediate assistance to the couple, and was drinking before the accident.

== Career statistics ==
As of 13 October 2021

Appearances and goals by club, season and competition
Club	Season	League			State League		National Cup		Continental		Other		Total	
Club	Season	Division	Apps	Goals	Apps	Goals	Apps	Goals	Apps	Goals	Apps	Goals	Apps	Goals
Botafogo	2016	Série A	0	0	1	0	1	0	—		—		2	0
Botafogo	2017	Série A	0	0	9	0	0	0	0	0	—		9	0
Botafogo	2018	Série A	32	1	11	0	0	0	5 (Note: Appearances in Copa Libertadores)	0	—		48	1
Botafogo	2019	Série A	25	1	9	0	4	0	4 (Note: Appearances in Copa Sudamericana)	0	—		42	1
Botafogo	2020	Série A	4	0	0	0	0	0	0	0	—		4	0
Botafogo	Total		61	2	30	0	5	0	9	0	0	0	105	2
Athletico Paranaense	2021	Série A	20	1	5	0	6	0	8	0	—		39	0
Career total			81	2	35	0	11	0	17	0	0	0	144	2

== Honours ==
Botafogo

- Campeonato Carioca: 2018

Athletico Paranaense

- Copa Sudamericana: 2021
