= Luiz Gustavo (footballer, born 1994) =

Brazilian footballer

Personal information
- Full name: Luiz Gustavo Tavares Conde
- Date of birth: 12 February 1994 (age 32)
- Place of birth: Valentim Gentil, Brazil
- Height: 1.82 m (5 ft 11 1/2 in)
- Position: Defender

Youth career
- 2010–2013: Palmeiras

Senior career*
Years	Team	Apps	(Gls)
2012–2017	Palmeiras	4	(0)
2013–2015	→ Vitória (loan)	62	(5)
2016	→ Ferroviária (loan)	3	(0)
2016	→ Avaí (loan)	8	(0)
2017	→ Oeste (loan)	18	(0)
2018–2020	Vasco da Gama	41	(0)
2019	→ Guarani (loan)	23	(1)
2020	→ Goiás (loan)	13	(0)
2020–2021	Cuiabá	13	(0)
2021	Guarani	4	(0)
2021–2022	Santo André	12	(1)
2022–2023	Mirassol	25	(0)
2023	ABC	9	(2)
2023	Juventude	8	(0)
2024	Santo André	6	(0)
2024	Volta Redonda	3	(0)
2024–2025	Ituano	15	(0)
2025–2026	Arema	17	(0)
- * Club domestic league appearances and goals as of 11 January 2026

Luiz Gustavo Tavares Conde (born 12 February 1994) is a Brazilian footballer who plays as a defender.
