= Joel Carli =

Argentine footballer

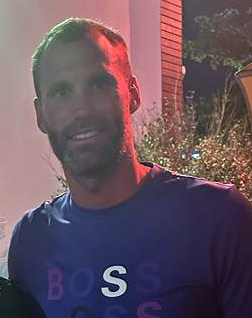
- Carli in 2023

Personal information
- Full name: Mauro Joel Carli
- Date of birth: 1986 (age 39–40)
- Place of birth: Mar del Plata, Argentina
- Height: 1.91 m (6 ft 3 in)
- Position: Centre-back

Youth career
- Quilmes de Mar del Plata
- 2002: Kimberley
- 2002–2006: Aldosivi

Senior career*
Years	Team	Apps	(Gls)
2006–2011	Aldosivi	68	(3)
2007–2008	→ Deportivo Morón (loan)	27	(4)
2009–2010	→ Gimnasia La Plata (loan)	0	(0)
2011–2015	Quilmes	84	(1)
2016–2019	Botafogo	124	(5)
2020–2021	Aldosivi	2	(0)
2021–2023	Botafogo	32	(4)
- * Club domestic league appearances and goals

Mauro Joel Carli (born 1986) is an Argentine former professional footballer who played as a centre-back.

== Career ==
Born in Mar del Plata, Carli started his senior career with hometown club Aldosivi. After loan stints at Deportivo Merlo and Gimnasia La Plata, he moved to Quilmes in July 2011.

=== Quilmes ===
Carli made his debut for Quilmes on 7 August 2011, starting in a 3–1 away loss against Boca Unidos in the Primera B Nacional. He scored his first goal for the club on 20 August of the following year, netting the winner in a 2–1 home success against Unión de Santa Fe.

=== Botafogo ===
On 3 December 2015, after being regularly used, Carli moved abroad and joined Botafogo.

== Post-playing career ==
Throughout the rest of the 2023 Brazilian Championship, Lúcio Flávio was appointed as the interim coach of Botafogo, with Carli serving as his assistant coach.

== Career statistics ==
As of 15 March 2023

Appearances and goals by club, season and competition
Club	Season	League			Cup		Continental		State League		Other		Total	
Club	Season	Division	Apps	Goals	Apps	Goals	Apps	Goals	Apps	Goals	Apps	Goals	Apps	Goals
Aldosivi	2005–06	Primera B Nacional	1	0	—		—		—		—		1	0
Aldosivi	2006–07	Primera B Nacional	12	0	—		—		—		—		12	0
Aldosivi	2008–09	Argentine Primera División	29	2	—		—		—		—		29	2
Aldosivi	2010–11	Argentine Primera División	26	1	—		—		—		—		26	1
Aldosivi	Total		68	3	—		—		—		—		68	3
Deportivo Morón (loan)	2007–08	Primera B Metropolitana	27	4	—		—		—		—		27	4
Gimnasia La Plata (loan)	2009–10	Argentine Primera División	0	0	0	0	—		—		—		0	0
Quilmes	2011–12	Argentine Primera División	23	0	1	0	—		—		—		24	0
Quilmes	2012–13	Argentine Primera División	14	1	0	0	—		—		—		14	1
Quilmes	2013–14	Argentine Primera División	14	0	1	0	—		—		—		15	0
Quilmes	2014	Argentine Primera División	15	0	0	0	—		—		—		15	0
Quilmes	2015	Argentine Primera División	18	0	1	0	—		—		—		19	0
Quilmes	Total		84	1	3	0	—		—		—		87	1
Botafogo	2016	Série A	16	0	2	0	—		12 (Note: Appearance(s) in Campeonato Carioca)	2	—		30	2
Botafogo	2017	Série A	28	1	5	1	11 (Note: Appearance(s) in Copa Libertadores)	0	5	0	—		49	2
Botafogo	2018	Série A	29	1	1	0	5 (Note: Appearance(s) in Copa Sudamericana)	0	4	1	—		39	2
Botafogo	2019	Série A	25	0	1	0	4	0	1	0	—		31	0
Botafogo	2020	Série A	0	0	1	0	0	0	4	0	—		5	0
Botafogo	Total		98	2	10	1	20	0	26	3	—		160	6
Aldosivi	2020	Argentine Primera División	2 (Note: Soccerway counts Copa de la Liga Profesional appearances as league appearances.)	0	—		—		—		—		2	0
Botafogo	2021	Série B	16	2	0	0	—		0	0	—		16	2
Botafogo	2022	Série A	5	0	3	0	—		9	2	—		17	2
Botafogo	2023	Série A	0	0	0	0	0	0	2	0	—		2	0
Botafogo	Total		21	2	3	0	0	0	11	2	—		35	4
Career total			300	12	16	1	20	0	37	5	0	0	373	18

== Honours ==
Botafogo

- Campeonato Carioca: 2018
- Campeonato Brasileiro Série B: 2021
