= Frickson Erazo =

Ecuadorian footballer (born 1988)

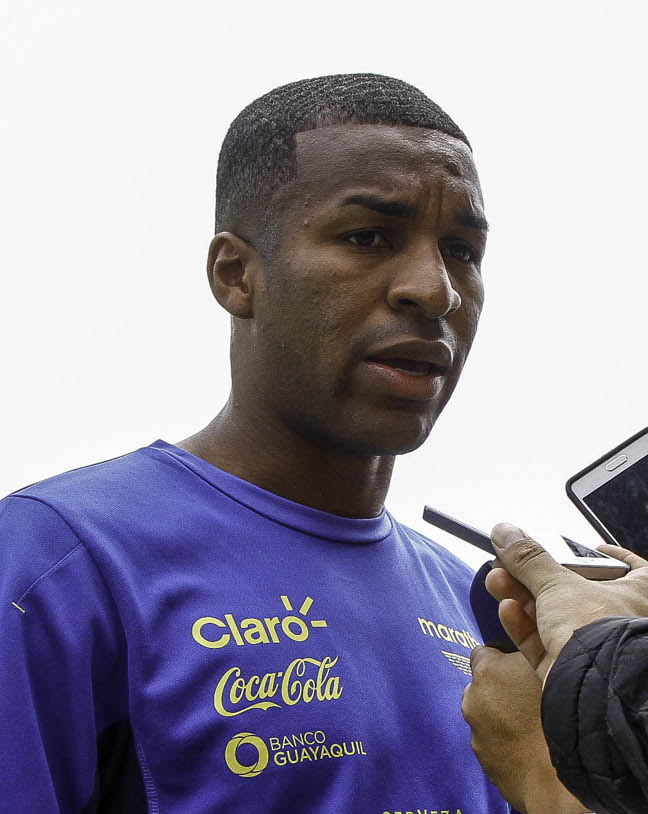

Personal information
- Full name: Frickson Rafael Erazo Vivero
- Date of birth: 5 May 1988 (age 38)
- Place of birth: Esmeraldas, Ecuador
- Height: 1.92 m (6 ft 3 1/2 in)
- Position: Centre back

Youth career
- 2005–2007: El Nacional

Senior career*
Years	Team	Apps	(Gls)
2006–2011	El Nacional	68	(2)
2007	→ Técnico Universitario (loan)	3	(0)
2012–2015	Barcelona SC	83	(2)
2014	→ Flamengo (loan)	2	(0)
2015	→ Grêmio (loan)	23	(2)
2016–2018	Atlético Mineiro	22	(0)
2018	→ Vasco da Gama (loan)	5	(0)
2018–2019	Barcelona SC	0	(0)
2020–2021	9 de Octubre	3	(0)

International career
2011–2018	Ecuador	64	(2)
- * Club domestic league appearances and goals

Frickson Rafael Erazo Vivero (Spanish pronunciation: [ˈfɾikson eˈɾaso]; born 5 May 1988) is a retired Ecuadorian professional footballer who played as a centre back He is a member of the Ecuador national team.

== Club career ==
=== El Nacional ===
Erazo began his professional playing career at El Nacional, where he spent six seasons. He then joined Barcelona SC in January 2012.

=== Barcelona SC ===
He made his Barcelona SC debut on 2 February 2012 against Deportivo Cuenca and won 3–1. He scored his first goal for the club against LDU Quito on 29 April 2012 in a 2–2 draw. He helped Barcelona SC become Ecuadorian Serie A champions that season, the club's first league title since 1997. This league title was also the first honour in Erazo's career.

=== Flamengo ===
In January 2014, Erazo moved to Brazilian side Flamengo. He made his debut on 2 February 2014 in a 5-2 Campeonato Carioca win over Macaé, but was sent off during the match. Erazo played a further five Campeonato Carioca matches (the annual football championship of Rio de Janeiro) matches for Flamengo, helping them to the state title.

=== Grêmio ===
On 17 January 2015 it was confirmed Erazo would join Grêmio on loan for an entire year.

On 9 December 2015, it was confirmed that Erazo came to terms with Grêmio and parted ways due to economical problems of the team.

=== Atlético Mineiro ===
On 2 January 2016, it was confirmed that Erazo would be joining Atlético Mineiro.

=== Barcelona SC ===
In mid 2018, Erazo returned to Barcelona SC. However he was not able to play due to an inconvenience with Atlético Mineiro (at that time the club who owned his sports rights). On 19 February 2019 his agent announced, that the player would be registered for the 2019 season. However, the player had not yet made his debut nine months after joining the club and went out to medias and said, that he was very surprised by the situation.

=== Retirement ===
After a spell at 9 de Octubre, Erazo announced his retirement from football on 13 February 2021.

== International career ==
Erazo made his debut for the Ecuador national football team on 20 April 2011 in a friendly match against Argentina Erazo scored his first goal for Ecuador on 7 June 2011 in a 1–1 draw against Greece played at Citi Field, New York City, United States. Erazo was selected for Ecuador's squad to take part in the 2011 Copa América held in Argentina. He played in all three group games, but with Ecuador failing to win any, they were eliminated at the first stage.

He has made 45 international appearances and was in Ecuador's 23 men squad for the 2014 World Cup.

=== International goals ===
Scores and results list Ecuador's goal tally first.

#	Date	Venue	Opponent	Score	Final	Competition
1.	8 June 2011	Citi Field, New York City, United States	Greece	1–1	1–1	International friendly
2.	8 October 2015	El Monumental, Buenos Aires, Argentina	Argentina	1–0	2–0	2018 FIFA World Cup qualification

== Honours ==
Barcelona SC

- Serie A: 2012

Flamengo

- Campeonato Carioca: 2014

Atlético Mineiro

- Campeonato Mineiro: 2017

9 de Octubre

- Ecuadorian Serie B: 2020
