= Andrés Ríos (footballer, born 1989) =

Argentine footballer

Personal information
- Full name: Andrés Lorenzo Ríos
- Date of birth: 1 August 1989 (age 37)
- Place of birth: Buenos Aires, Argentina
- Height: 1.81 m (5 ft 11 in)
- Position: Forward

Team information
- Current team: Colegiales

Youth career
- River Plate

Senior career*
Years	Team	Apps	(Gls)
2007–2013	River Plate	51	(5)
2010–2011	→ Wisła Kraków (loan)	17	(1)
2013	→ Deportivo Cuenca (loan)	40	(22)
2014–2015	América	12	(2)
2014–2015	→ Leones Negros (loan)	19	(1)
2016–2017	Defensa y Justicia	34	(7)
2017–2019	Vasco da Gama	57	(15)
2019	→ Racing Club (loan)	2	(0)
2019–2021	San Jose Earthquakes	63	(6)
2022	Aldosivi	14	(1)
2022–2023	Defensa y Justicia	14	(2)
2024	Deportivo Táchira	28	(1)
2025–	Colegiales	3	(0)

International career
2008–2009	Argentina U20	10	(2)
- * Club domestic league appearances and goals as of 17:22, 25 July 2025 (UTC)

Andrés Lorenzo Ríos (born 1 August 1989) known as Andy Ríos, is an Argentine professional footballer who plays as a striker for Colegiales. Following the 2021 season, San Jose declined their contract option on Ríos.

== Club career ==
Coming through the well regarded youth system of River Plate, Ríos made his debut on 4 March 2007 in a 2–1 away loss against Estudiantes.

== International career ==
In January 2009, Ríos was selected to join the Argentina under-20 squad for the 2009 South American Youth Championship in Venezuela.

== Career statistics ==
=== Club ===
As of 26 June 2012

Appearances and goals by club, season and competition
Club	Season	League			National cup		Continental		Total	
Club	Season	Division	Apps	Goals	Apps	Goals	Apps	Goals	Apps	Goals
River Plate	Clausura 2007	Argentine Primera División	8	0	–		2	0	10	0
River Plate	2007–08	Argentine Primera División	11	2	–		5	2	16	4
River Plate	2008–09	Argentine Primera División	14	2	–		0	0	14	2
River Plate	2009–10	Argentine Primera División	4	0	–		0	0	4	0
River Plate	2011–12	Nacional B	14	1	4	0	–		18	1
River Plate	Total		51	5	4	0	7	2	62	7
Wisła Kraków	2010–11	Ekstraklasa	17	1	4	0	–		21	1

== Honours ==
River Plate

- Primera División Clausura: 2008
- Nacional B: 2011–12

Wisła Kraków

- Ekstraklasa: 2010–11
