= Fabrício (footballer, born 1987) =

Brazilian footballer

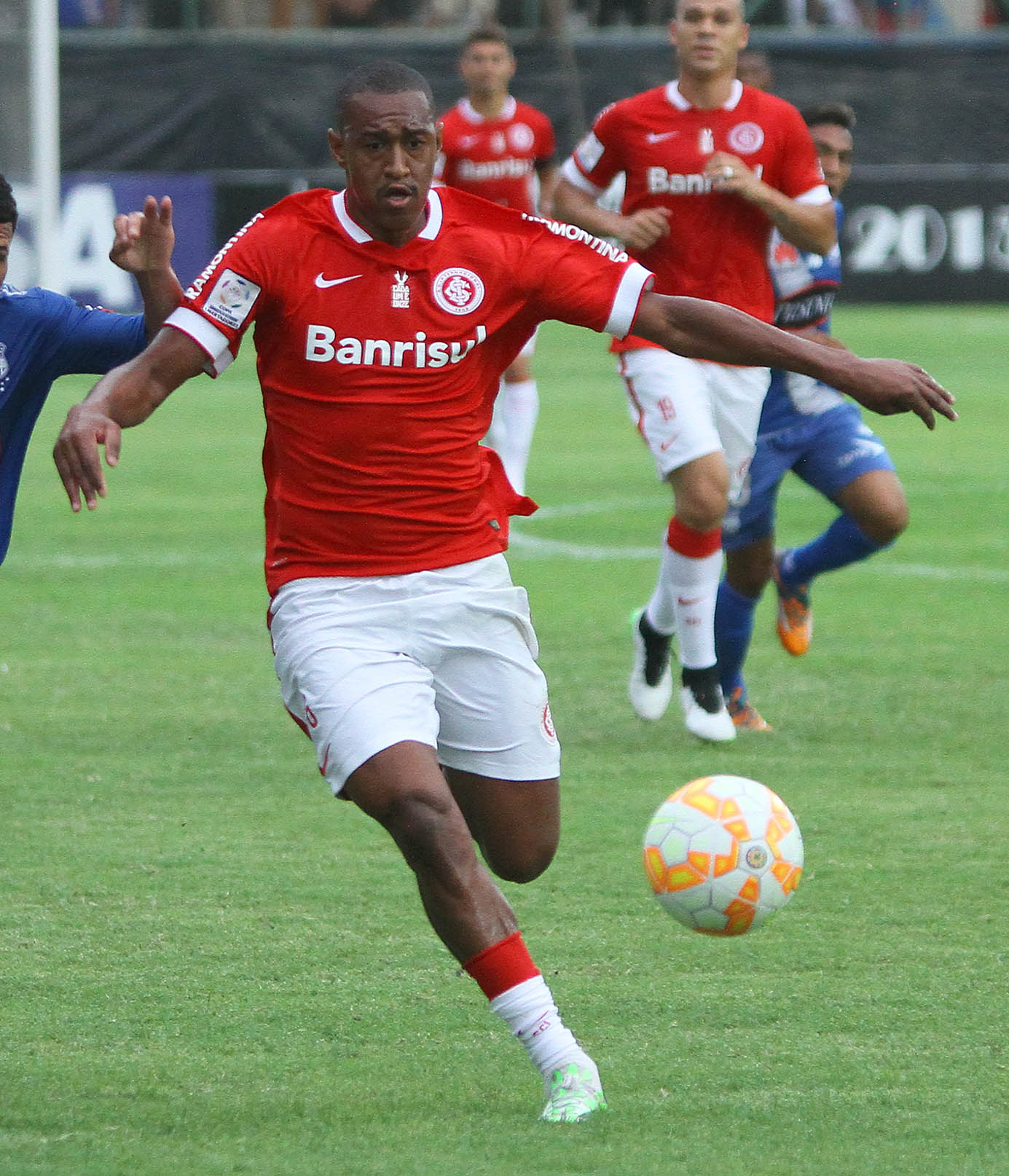
- Fabrício playing for Internacional in 2015

Personal information
- Full name: Fabrício dos Santos Silva
- Date of birth: 11 January 1987 (age 39)
- Place of birth: São Paulo, Brazil
- Height: 1.85 m (6 ft 1 in)
- Position: Left back

Team information
- Current team: Água Santa

Youth career
- Portuguesa
- 2005–2006: São Paulo

Senior career*
Years	Team	Apps	(Gls)
2006–2008	Corinthians	1	(0)
2007	→ Ituano (loan)		
2008	Rio Branco-SP		
2008	Santo André		
2009	Monte Azul		
2009–2011	Portuguesa	48	(4)
2011	→ Internacional (loan)	18	(1)
2012–2015	Internacional	91	(5)
2015	→ Cruzeiro (loan)	25	(1)
2016–2018	Cruzeiro	0	(0)
2016	→ Palmeiras (loan)	6	(0)
2017	→ Atlético Paranaense (loan)	20	(1)
2018	→ Vasco da Gama (loan)	10	(1)
2019	Vitória	1	(0)
2020	Água Santa	1	(0)
- * Club domestic league appearances and goals as of 00:15, 5 March 2020 (UTC)

Fabrício dos Santos Silva (born 11 January 1987), simply known as Fabrício, is a Brazilian footballer who plays for Esporte Clube Água Santa. Mainly a left back, he can also play as a midfielder.

On 2 April 2015, Fabrício was sent off whilst playing for Internacional in a 1–0 victory against Ypiranga; while in possession of the ball, Fabrício received boos from his own fans, which caused him to respond by sticking his middle finger to them in retaliation. After receiving the red card from referee Luís Teixeira, Fabrício took his shirt off and threw it to the ground, before he stormed off the pitch screaming "I'm leaving". Internacional suspended him for his actions and he was loaned to the Brazilian club Cruzeiro six days later.

== Honours ==
Internacional

- Recopa Sudamericana: 2011
- Campeonato Gaúcho: 2012, 2013, 2014

Palmeiras

- Campeonato Brasileiro Série A: 2016
