= 2015 CR Vasco da Gama season =

Vasco da Gama
2015 season
- President: Eurico Miranda
- Head Coach: Jorginho since 16 August (Celso Roth since 22 June until 15 August) (Doriva until 21 June)
- Stadium: São Januário; Maracanã
- Brasileirão Série A: 18h (relegated)
- Copa do Brasil: Quarterfinals
- Rio de Janeiro State Championship: Champions; Guanabara Tournament: 3rd Super Clássicos Tournament: Runners-up
- Top goalscorer: League: Nenê (9); All: Rafael Silva (10)
Home colours	Away colours	Third colours

The 2015 season was Club de Regatas Vasco da Gama's 117th year in existence, the club's 100th season in existence of football, and the club's 43rd season playing in the Brasileirão Série A, the top flight of Brazilian football.

== Players ==
=== Current squad ===
Note: Flags indicate national team as defined under FIFA eligibility rules; some limited exceptions apply. Players may hold more than one non-FIFA nationality. Squad correct as of 15 November 2015.

No.	Pos.	Nation	Player
—	GK	(Brazil) BRA	Charles
—	GK	(Brazil) BRA	Jordi
—	GK	(Uruguay) URU	Martín Silva
—	DF	(Brazil) BRA	Aislan
—	DF	(Brazil) BRA	Anderson Salles
—	DF	(Brazil) BRA	Bruno
—	DF	(Brazil) BRA	Bruno Teles
—	DF	(Brazil) BRA	Christianno (on loan from Bangu)
—	DF	(Brazil) BRA	Henrique
—	DF	(Brazil) BRA	João Carlos
—	DF	(Brazil) BRA	Jomar
—	DF	(Brazil) BRA	Júlio César
—	DF	(Brazil) BRA	Luan
—	DF	(Brazil) BRA	Mádson
—	DF	(Brazil) BRA	Nei
—	DF	(Brazil) BRA	Rafael Vaz
—	DF	(Brazil) BRA	Rodrigo
—	MF	(Brazil) BRA	Andrezinho
—	MF	(Argentina) ARG	Emanuel Biancucchi
—	MF	(Brazil) BRA	Bruno Gallo
—	MF	(Brazil) BRA	Diguinho
—	MF	(Paraguay) PAR	Julio dos Santos
—	MF	(Argentina) ARG	Pablo Guiñazú (captain)
—	MF	(Brazil) BRA	Jean Patrick (on loan from Luverdense)
—	MF	(Brazil) BRA	Jéferson
—	MF	(Brazil) BRA	Lucas (on loan from Friburguense)
—	MF	(Brazil) BRA	Mateus Vital (youth player)
—	MF	(Brazil) BRA	Serginho (on loan from Atlético Mineiro)
—	MF	(Chile) CHI	Felipe Seymour (on loan from Cruzeiro)
—	FW	(Brazil) BRA	Dagoberto (on loan from Cruzeiro)
—	FW	(Brazil) BRA	Éder Luís
—	FW	(Argentina) ARG	Germán Herrera
—	FW	(Brazil) BRA	Jorge Henrique
—	FW	(Brazil) BRA	Leandrão
—	FW	(Brazil) BRA	Nenê
—	FW	(Brazil) BRA	Rafael Silva
—	FW	(Brazil) BRA	Renato Kayser (youth player)
—	FW	(Colombia) COL	Duvier Riascos (on loan from Cruzeiro)
—	FW	(Brazil) BRA	Romarinho
—	FW	(Brazil) BRA	Thalles (youth player)

==== Reserve squad (Vasco da Gama B) ====
Note: Flags indicate national team as defined under FIFA eligibility rules; some limited exceptions apply. Players may hold more than one non-FIFA nationality. Squad correct as of 15 November 2015.

No.	Pos.	Nation	Player
—	GK	(Brazil) BRA	Alessandro
—	GK	(Brazil) BRA	Diogo Silva
—	DF	(Brazil) BRA	Erick
—	DF	(Brazil) BRA	Lorran (youth player)
—	MF	(Brazil) BRA	Guilherme
—	MF	(Brazil) BRA	Índio (youth player)
—	MF	(Brazil) BRA	Matheus Batista
—	MF	(Brazil) BRA	Sandro Silva (footballer)

==== Out of loan ====
Note: Flags indicate national team as defined under FIFA eligibility rules; some limited exceptions apply. Players may hold more than one non-FIFA nationality. Squad correct as of 15 September 2015.

No.	Pos.	Nation	Player
—	MF	(Paraguay) PAR	Eduardo Aranda (on loan to Olimpia)
—	MF	(Brazil) BRA	Bernardo (on loan to Ceará)
—	FW	(Brazil) BRA	Erick Luis (on loan to Boa)
—	DF	(Brazil) BRA	Marlon (on loan to Bahia)
—	DF	(Brazil) BRA	Max (on loan to Macaé)
—	MF	(Colombia) COL	Santiago Montoya (on loan to Vitória de Guimarães)
—	DF	(Brazil) BRA	Nikolas Mariano (on loan to Oliveirense)
—	MF	(Brazil) BRA	Paulista (on loan to Boa)
—	GK	(Brazil) BRA	Rafael Copetti (on loan to Bragantino)
—	DF	(Brazil) BRA	Ricardo Graça (on loan to Vitória de Guimarães)
—	MF	(Brazil) BRA	Victor Bolt (on loan to Portuguesa)
—	FW	(Brazil) BRA	William Barbio (on loan to Chapecoense)
—	FW	(Brazil) BRA	Yago (on loan to Minnesota United)

=== Squad information ===
As of 15 November 2015.

No.	Name	Nationality	Position (s)	Date of birth (age)	Signed From
Goalkeepers
	Charles	(Brazil)	GK	4 February 1994 (aged 21)	Youth system
	Jordi	(Brazil)	GK	3 September 1993 (aged 22)	Youth system
	Martín Silva	(Uruguay)	GK	25 March 1983 (aged 32)	(Paraguay) Olimpia
Defenders
	Aislan	(Brazil)	CB	11 January 1988 (aged 27)	(Brazil) Madureira
	Anderson Salles	(Brazil)	CB / DMF	16 February 1988 (aged 27)	(Brazil) Ituano
	Bruno Ferreira	(Brazil)	RB	14 September 1994 (aged 21)	(Brazil) Bragantino (loaned from Vasco da Gama)
	Bruno Teles	(Brazil)	LB / LWB	1 May 1986 (aged 29)	(Russia) Krylia Sovetov Samara
	Christianno (on loan from Bangu)	(Brazil)	LB	29 September 1991 (aged 24)	(Brazil) Vila Nova (loaned from Bangu)
	Henrique	(Brazil)	LB / LWM	25 April 1994 (aged 21)	Youth system
	João Carlos	(Brazil)	CB	1 January 1982 (aged 33)	(Russia) Spartak Moskva
	Jomar	(Brazil)	CB	28 September 1992 (aged 23)	(Brazil) Rio Branco (SP) (loaned from Vasco da Gama)
	Júlio César	(Brazil)	LB / LWM	15 June 1982 (aged 33)	Free agent (for the last time on Botafogo)
	Luan	(Brazil)	CB / RB	10 May 1993 (aged 22)	Youth system
	Mádson	(Brazil)	RB	13 January 1992 (aged 23)	(Brazil) ABC (loaned from Bahia)
	Nei	(Brazil)	RB / LB	6 December 1985 (aged 30)	(Brazil) Vasco da Gama – (B)
	Rafael Vaz	(Brazil)	CB / LSM / DMF	17 September 1988 (aged 27)	(Brazil) Vasco da Gama – (B)
	Rodrigo	(Brazil)	CB	27 August 1980 (aged 35)	(Brazil) Goiás
Midfielders
	Andrezinho	(Brazil)	AMF / LSM / RSM	30 July 1983 (aged 32)	(China) Tianjin Teda
	Emanuel Biancucchi	(Argentina)	AMF / LWM / RWM	28 July 1988 (aged 27)	Free agent (for the last time on Bahia)
	Bruno Gallo	(Brazil)	CMF / LSM	7 May 1988 (aged 27)	(Portugal) Marítimo
	Diguinho	(Brazil)	DMF / CMF	20 March 1983 (aged 32)	Free agent (for the last time on Fluminense)
	Julio dos Santos	(Paraguay)	CMF / AMF / SS	7 May 1983 (aged 32)	(Paraguay) Cerro Porteño
	Pablo Guiñazú	(Argentina)	DMF / LSM	26 August 1978 (aged 37)	(Paraguay) Libertad
	Jean Patrick (on loan from Luverdense)	(Brazil)	DMF / RB / RSM	25 June 1992 (aged 23)	(Brazil) Luverdense
	Jéferson	(Brazil)	AMF / LSM	15 July 1984 (aged 31)	(Brazil) Boavista
	Lucas (on loan from Friburguense)	(Brazil)	LSM / DMF	23 September 1988 (aged 27)	(Brazil) Macaé (loaned from Friburguense)
	Mateus Vital (youth player)	(Brazil)	AMF	12 February 1998 (aged 17)	Youth system
	Serginho (on loan from Atlético Mineiro)	(Brazil)	DMF / RSM	14 April 1987 (aged 28)	(Brazil) Criciúma (loaned from Atlético Mineiro)
	Felipe Seymour (on loan from Cruzeiro)	(Chile)	CMF / DMF	23 July 1987 (aged 28)	(Brazil) Cruzeiro
Forwards
	Dagoberto (on loan from Cruzeiro)	(Brazil)	SS / CF / ST	22 March 1983 (aged 32)	(Brazil) Cruzeiro
	Éder Luís	(Brazil)	RW / SS / CF	19 April 1985 (aged 30)	(United Arab Emirates) Al-Nasr Dubai (loaned from Vasco da Gama)
	Germán Herrera	(Argentina)	ST / SS / CF	19 July 1983 (aged 32)	(United Arab Emirates) Emirates Club
	Jorge Henrique	(Brazil)	RW / LW / RWM / LWM / SS	23 April 1982 (aged 33)	(Brazil) Internacional
	Leandrão	(Brazil)	ST / CF	18 July 1983 (aged 32)	(Brazil) Brasil de Pelotas
	Nenê	(Brazil)	LW / AMF / SS / LWM	19 July 1981 (aged 34)	(England) West Ham United
	Rafael Silva	(Brazil)	CF / RW / LW / SS / ST	8 October 1990 (aged 25)	(Brazil) Ituano
	Renato Kayser (youth player)	(Brazil)	ST / CF / SS / RW / LW	17 February 1996 (aged 19)	Youth system
	Duvier Riascos (on loan from Cruzeiro)	(Colombia)	CF / RW	26 June 1986 (aged 29)	(Brazil) Cruzeiro
	Romarinho	(Brazil)	CF / RW	20 September 1993 (aged 22)	(Brazil) Brasiliense
	Thalles (youth player)	(Brazil)	ST / CF	18 May 1995 (aged 20)	Youth system

==== from Vasco da Gama – (B) (reserve team) ====
As of 15 November 2015.

No.	Name	Nationality	Position (s)	Date of birth (age)	Signed From
Goalkeepers
	Alessandro	(Brazil)	GK	30 March 1988 (aged 27)	(Brazil) Náutico (loaned from Vasco da Gama)
	Diogo Silva	(Brazil)	GK	7 August 1986 (aged 29)	(Brazil) XV de Novembro (Piracicaba) (loaned from Vasco da Gama)
Defenders
	Erick	(Brazil)	LB	17 January 1993 (aged 22)	(Brazil) XV de Novembro (Piracicaba) (loaned from Vasco da Gama)
	Lorran (youth player)	(Brazil)	LB / LWM	8 January 1996 (aged 19)	Youth system
Midfielders
	Guilherme	(Brazil)	AMF / LWM	31 March 1994 (aged 21)	(Brazil) Bragantino (loaned from Vasco da Gama)
	Índio (youth player)	(Brazil)	AMF	28 February 1996 (aged 19)	(Brazil) Santos – (U-20) (youth system)
	Matheus Batista	(Brazil)	DMF / CB	4 October 1994 (aged 21)	(Brazil) Vasco da Gama – (U–20)
	Sandro Silva	(Brazil)	DMF / RSM	29 April 1984 (aged 31)	(Brazil) Bragantino (loaned from Vasco da Gama)

==== Vasco da Gama – (U–20) ====
As of 25 August 2015.

No.	Name	Nationality	Position (s)	Date of birth (age)	Signed From
Goalkeepers
	Gabriel Félix	(Brazil)	GK	4 April 1995 (aged 20)	Youth system
	Junior Souza	(Brazil)	GK	6 March 1996 (aged 19)	Youth system
	Yuri Duarte	(Brazil)	GK	22 May 1997 (aged 18)	Youth system
Defenders
	Alan Cardoso	(Brazil)	LB	5 January 1998 (aged 17)	Youth system
	Cássio Augusto	(Brazil)	RB	22 October 1997 (aged 18)	Youth system
	Daniel Gonçalves	(Brazil)	CB	4 March 1996 (aged 19)	(Brazil) Cruzeiro – (U-20) (youth system)
	Kadu Fernandes	(Brazil)	CB	2 March 1995 (aged 20)	Youth system
	Linderman	(Brazil)	RB	17 March 1995 (aged 20)	Youth system
	Lucas Santos	(Brazil)	LB	19 February 1997 (aged 18)	Youth system
	Marcel Almeida	(Brazil)	CB	1 March 1996 (aged 19)	(Brazil) Corinthians – (U-20) (youth system)
	Marcio	(Brazil)	LB	3 February 1995 (aged 20)	Youth system
	Matheus Barbosa	(Brazil)	CB	18 February 1997 (aged 18)	Youth system
	Matheus Cambuci	(Brazil)	CB	26 January 1996 (aged 19)	Youth system
	Paulo Vitor	(Brazil)	RB	2 January 1997 (aged 18)	(Brazil) Penapolense – (U-20) (youth system)
	Ricardo Graça	(Brazil)	CB	16 February 1997 (aged 18)	Youth system
	Richard	(Brazil)	RB	3 April 1995 (aged 20)	Youth system
	Willian Costa	(Brazil)	CB	23 February 1997 (aged 18)	Youth system
Midfielders
	Andrey Ramos	(Brazil)	DMF	15 February 1998 (aged 17)	Youth system
	Bruno Cosendey	(Brazil)	DMF	25 January 1997 (aged 18)	Youth system
	Caio Guilherme	(Brazil)	AMF	10 March 1997 (aged 18)	Youth system
	Diego Sinhorini	(Brazil)	AMF	29 July 1996 (aged 19)	(Brazil) Ituano – (U-20) (youth system)
	Eduardo Melo	(Brazil)	AMF	1 May 1996 (aged 19)	(Brazil) Portuguesa – (U-20) (youth system)
	Evander	(Brazil)	AMF	9 June 1998 (aged 17)	Youth system
	Giorgio	(Italy)	DMF	9 March 1994 (aged 21)	Youth system
	Hugo Lavouras	(Brazil)	AMF	7 March 1996 (aged 19)	Youth system
	Iago Índio	(Brazil)	DMF	30 April 1996 (aged 19)	Youth system
	Íkaro	(Brazil)	DMF	5 May 1996 (aged 19)	(Brazil) Fluminense – (U-20) (youth system)
	João Victor	(Brazil)	DMF	5 March 1997 (aged 18)	Youth system
	Luan Rocha	(Brazil)	AMF	23 March 1995 (aged 20)	Youth system
	Lucas Barboza	(Brazil)	DMF	14 March 1996 (aged 19)	Youth system
	Marquinhos	(Brazil)	AMF	4 January 1997 (aged 18)	Youth system
	Matheus Isaías	(Brazil)	DMF	22 March 1996 (aged 19)	(Brazil) Portuguesa
	Matheus Santana	(Brazil)	AMF	16 March 1995 (aged 20)	Youth system
	Netinho	(Brazil)	AMF	18 December 1997 (aged 18)	Youth system
	Rafael Martins	(Brazil)	DMF	6 February 1997 (aged 18)	Youth system
Forwards
	Bruno Henricky	(Brazil)	ST	17 August 1997 (aged 18)	Youth system
	Caio Monteiro	(Brazil)	ST	10 February 1997 (aged 18)	Youth system
	Daniel Pessoa	(Brazil)	ST	14 April 1995 (aged 20)	Youth system
	Emerson Carioca	(Brazil)	ST	7 December 1995 (aged 20)	(Brazil) Cruzeiro – (U-20) (youth system)
	Gabriel Braga	(Brazil)	ST	18 May 1996 (aged 19)	(Brazil) Ituano – (U-20) (youth system)
	Leandro Muriqui	(Brazil)	ST	10 March 1997 (aged 18)	Youth system
	Lucas Choco	(Brazil)	ST	19 June 1996 (aged 19)	Youth system

=== Transfers ===
==== In ====
Date	Player	Number	Position	Previous club	Fee/notes	Ref
19 December 2014	(Brazil) Douglas Silva		DF	(Brazil) Vasco da Gama (on loan from Red Bull Salzburg)	Free transfer, two-years contract	
22 December 2014	(Brazil) Bruno		DF	(Brazil) Portuguesa	Free transfer	
26 December 2014	(Brazil) Erick Luis		FW	(Brazil) Bragantino (on loan from Bahia)	Free transfer	
27 December 2014	(Brazil) Índio		MF	(Brazil) Santos – (U-20) (youth system)	Free transfer	
28 December 2014	(Brazil) Marcinho		MF	(Brazil) Vitória	Free transfer	
29 December 2014	(Paraguay) Julio dos Santos		MF	(Paraguay) Cerro Porteño		
2 January 2015	(Brazil) Aislan		DF	(Brazil) Madureira		
2 January 2015	(Brazil) Erick		DF	(Brazil) Boavista (on loan from Olaria)		
3 January 2015	(Brazil) Victor Bolt		MF	(Brazil) Madureira		
5 January 2015	(Brazil) Romarinho		FW	(Brazil) Brasiliense		
14 January 2015	(Brazil) Mádson		DF	(Brazil) ABC (on loan from Bahia)		
26 February 2015	(Brazil) Daniel		MF	(Brazil) Bangu	Free transfer	
13 March 2015	(Argentina) Emanuel Biancucchi		MF	(Brazil) Bahia	Free transfer, free agent	
3 May 2015	(Brazil) Júlio César		MF	(Brazil) Botafogo	Free transfer, free agent	
3 May 2015	(Brazil) Diguinho		MF	(Brazil) Fluminense	Free transfer, free agent	
20 May 2015	(Brazil) Nikolas Mariano		DF	(Brazil) Flamengo de Guarulhos	Free transfer	
19 June 2015; 1 July 2015	(Brazil) Andrezinho		MF	(China) Tianjin Teda	Free transfer	
21 June 2015	(Argentina) Germán Herrera		FW	(United Arab Emirates) Emirates Club	Free transfer	
3 July 2015	(Brazil) Bruno Gallo		MF	(Portugal) Marítimo	Free transfer	
5 August 2015	(Brazil) Nenê		FW	(England) West Ham United	Free transfer	
5 August 2015	(Brazil) Jorge Henrique		FW	(Brazil) Internacional	Free transfer	
17 August 2015	(Brazil) João Carlos		DF	(Russia) Spartak Moskva	Free transfer	
31 August 2015	(Brazil) Leandrão		FW	(Brazil) Brasil de Pelotas	Free transfer	
1 September 2015	(Brazil) Jéferson		MF	(Brazil) Boavista	Free transfer	
8 September 2015	(Brazil) Bruno Teles		DF	(Russia) Krylia Sovetov Samara	Free transfer	

===== Loan in =====
Date from	Date to	Player	Number	Position	Previous club	Fee/notes	Ref
20 December 2014	30 April 2015	(Brazil) Lucas		MF	(Brazil) Macaé (on loan from Friburguense)	Loan transfer from Friburguense, Campeonato Carioca loan deal	
22 December 2014	31 December 2015	(Brazil) Jean Patrick		MF	(Brazil) Luverdense	Loan transfer from Luverdense, one-year loan deal	
31 December 2014	31 December 2015	(Brazil) Christianno		DF	(Brazil) Vila Nova (on loan from Bangu)	Loan transfer from Bangu, one-year loan deal	
23 January 2015	31 December 2015	(Brazil) Serginho		MF	(Brazil) Criciúma (on loan from Atlético Mineiro)	Loan transfer from Atlético Mineiro, one-year loan deal	
14 February 2015	27 July 2015	(Brazil) Gilberto		FW	(Canada) Toronto	Loan transfer from Toronto, one-year loan deal Previously end of loan: 31 December 2015	
20 February 2015	30 June 2015	(Brazil) Mosquito		FW	(Brazil) Atlético Paranaense (on loan from Macaé)	Loan transfer from Macaé, six-month loan deal	
27 February 2015	31 December 2015	(Brazil) Dagoberto		FW	(Brazil) Cruzeiro	Loan transfer from Cruzeiro, one-year loan deal	
8 May 2015	25 August 2015	(Brazil) Jackson Caucaia		MF	(Brazil) Ituano	Loan transfer from Ituano, half-year loan deal Previously end of loan: 31 December 2015	
25 May 2015	30 June 2016	(Colombia) Duvier Riascos		FW	(Brazil) Cruzeiro	Loan transfer from Cruzeiro, one-year loan deal	
11 August 2015	31 December 2015	(Chile) Felipe Seymour		MF	(Brazil) Cruzeiro	Loan transfer from Cruzeiro, half-year loan deal	

===== On trial (in) =====
Date from	Date to	Player	Number	Position	Previous club	Fee/notes	Ref
		(Brazil) Alessandro		GK	(Brazil) Náutico (on loan from Vasco da Gama)	Vasco da Gama – (B)	
	24 June 2015	(Brazil) Rafael Vaz		DF	(Brazil) Vasco da Gama	Vasco da Gama – (B)	
		(Brazil) Matheus Batista		MF	(Brazil) Vasco da Gama – (U-20) (youth system)	Vasco da Gama – (B)	
22 January 2015	7 February 2015	(Brazil) Éder Luís		FW	(United Arab Emirates) Al Nasr (on loan from Vasco da Gama)	CAPRRES – Scientific Project	
25 January 2015	25 February 2015	(Brazil) Daniel		MF	(Brazil) Bangu	Technical evaluation period	
26 January 2015	9 February 2015	(Brazil) Gilberto		FW	(Canada) Toronto	CAPRRES – Scientific Project	
		(Brazil) Márcio Azevedo		DF	(Ukraine) Shakhtar Donetsk	CAPRRES – Scientific Project	
		(Brazil) Fellype Gabriel		MF	(United Arab Emirates) Al-Sharjah	CAPRRES – Scientific Project	
		(Brazil) Diogo Silva		GK	(Brazil) XV de Novembro (Piracicaba) (on loan from Vasco da Gama)	Vasco da Gama – (B)	
		(Brazil) Jéferson		MF	(Brazil) Boavista	CAPRRES – Scientific Project	
20 May 2015	2 September 2015	(Brazil) Nikolas Mariano		DF	(Brazil) Flamengo de Guarulhos	Vasco da Gama – (B)	
9 June 2015	8 July 2015	(Brazil) Bernardo		MF	(Brazil) Vasco da Gama	Vasco da Gama – (B)	
		(Brazil) Valdiram		FW		Free agent	
		(Brazil) Sabão		FW	(Brazil) Gonçalense		
20 August 2015		(Brazil) Erick		DF	(Brazil) XV de Novembro (Piracicaba) (on loan from Vasco da Gama)	Vasco da Gama – (B)	
5 September 2015		(Brazil) Sandro Silva		DF	(Brazil) Bragantino (on loan from Vasco da Gama)	Vasco da Gama – (B)	
15 September 2015		(Brazil) Guilherme		DF	(Brazil) Bragantino (on loan from Vasco da Gama)	Vasco da Gama – (B)	

==== Out ====
Date	Player	Number	Position	Destination club	Fee/notes	Ref
29 November 2014; 1 December 2014	(Brazil) Rodrigo Dinamite		FW		Released, end of contract, previously on Duque de Caxias on loan from Vasco da Gama	
29 November 2014; 31 December 2014	(Brazil) Michel Alves		GK		Released, end of contract, previously under contract with Vasco da Gama out of squad	
29 November 2014; 31 December 2014	(Brazil) Willen		FW	(Brazil) Capivariano	End of contract, previously on Avaí on loan from Vasco da Gama	
29 November 2014; 31 December 2014	(Brazil) Malco		MF		Released, end of contract, previously on Macaé on loan from Vasco da Gama	
29 November 2014; 31 December 2014	(Brazil) André Rocha		DF	(Brazil) Botafogo (Ribeirão Preto)	Released, end of contract	
30 December 2014; 31 December 2014; 25 February 2015	(Brazil) Dakson		MF	(Brazil) Vitória	Released, end of contract Free transfer	
30 December 2014; 31 December 2014; 19 January 2015	(Brazil) Edmilson		FW	(Brazil) Red Bull Brasil	Released, end of contract Free transfer	
31 December 2014; 13 January 2015	(Brazil) Romário		FW	(Brazil) São Bento	End of contract, previously on Macaé on loan from Vasco da Gama; Free transfer	
15 April 2015	(Brazil) Daniel		MF		Released, end of contract	
20 April 2015	(Brazil) Eduardo		DF		Released, end of contract, previously under contract with Vasco da Gama out of squad	
4 June 2015	(Brazil) Marquinhos		FW	(Brazil) Macaé	Released, mutual contract rescission, free transfer	
9 June 2015	(Brazil) Douglas Silva		DF	(Brazil) Joinville	Released, mutual contract rescission, free transfer	
9 June 2015	(Brazil) Marcinho		MF		Released, mutual contract rescission	
30 June 2015	(Brazil) Fellipe Bastos		MF	(United Arab Emirates) Al Ain	Previously on Grêmio on loan from Vasco da Gama; R$ unknown	
1 September 2015	(Brazil) Jhon Cley		MF	(Saudi Arabia) Al-Qadisiyah	R$ unknown	

===== Loan out =====
Date from	Date to	Player	Number	Position	Destination club	Fee/notes	Ref
25 August 2013	30 June 2015	(Brazil) Éder Luís		FW	(United Arab Emirates) Al Nasr	R$ 6 million, two-years loan deal	
12 June 2014	30 June 2015	(Brazil) Fellipe Bastos		MF	(Brazil) Grêmio	Loan transfer, loaned in exchange for loan of Kléber, one-year loan deal Previously end of loan: 31 December 2015; Previously end of loan: 31 May 2015	
17 December 2014	30 April 2015	(Brazil) Diogo Silva		GK	(Brazil) XV de Novembro (Piracicaba)	Loan transfer, São Paulo State Championship loan deal	
29 December 2014	31 December 2015	(Paraguay) Eduardo Aranda		MF	(Paraguay) Olimpia	Loan transfer, one-year loan deal	
29 December 2014	31 December 2015	(Brazil) William Barbio		FW	(Brazil) Chapecoense	Loan transfer, one-year loan deal	
8 January 2014	31 December 2015	(Brazil) Max		DF	(Brazil) Macaé	Loan transfer, one-year loan deal	
16 January 2015	30 April 2015	(Brazil) Marlon		DF	(Brazil) Paysandu	Loan transfer, one-year loan deal Previously end of loan: 31 December 2015	
6 February 2015	30 April 2015	(Brazil) Bruno		DF	(Brazil) Bragantino	Loan transfer, São Paulo State Championship loan deal	
6 February 2015	31 May 2015	(Brazil) Erick Luis		FW	(Brazil) Bragantino	Loan transfer, São Paulo State Championship loan deal Previously end of loan: 30 April 2015; Previously end of loan: 31 December 2015	
15 March 2015	15 September 2015	(Brazil) Guilherme		MF	(Brazil) Bragantino	Loan transfer, one-year loan deal Previously end of loan: 31 December 2015	
8 May 2015	31 December 2015	(Brazil) Rafael Copetti		GK	(Brazil) Bragantino	Loan transfer, half-year loan deal	
15 May 2015	31 December 2015	(Brazil) Marlon		DF	(Brazil) Bahia	Loan transfer, one-year loan deal	
16 May 2015	20 August 2015	(Brazil) Erick		DF	(Brazil) XV de Novembro (Piracicaba)	Loan transfer, half-year loan deal Previously end of loan: 31 December 2015	
16 May 2015	31 December 2015	(Brazil) Victor Bolt		MF	(Brazil) Portuguesa	Loan transfer, half-year loan deal	
3 June 2015	5 September 2015	(Brazil) Sandro Silva		MF	(Brazil) Bragantino	Loan transfer, half-year loan deal Previously end of loan: 31 December 2015	
4 June 2015	31 December 2015	(Brazil) Erick Luis		FW	(Brazil) Boa	Loan transfer, half-year loan deal	
8 June 2015	31 December 2015	(Brazil) Paulista		MF	(Brazil) Boa	Loan transfer, half-year loan deal	
11 June 2015	30 June 2016	(Colombia) Santiago Montoya		MF	(Portugal) Vitória de Guimarães	Loan transfer, one-year loan deal	
11 June 2015	31 December 2015	(Brazil) Yago		FW	(United States) Minnesota United	Loan transfer, half-year loan deal	
9 July 2015	31 December 2015	(Brazil) Bernardo		FW	(Brazil) Ceará	Loan transfer, half-year loan deal	
2 September 2015	30 June 2016	(Brazil) Nikolas Mariano		DF	(Portugal) Oliveirense	Loan transfer, one-year loan deal	
2 September 2015	30 June 2016	(Brazil) Ricardo Graça		DF	(Portugal) Vitória de Guimarães	Loan transfer, one-year loan deal	

===== On trial (out) =====
Date from	Date to	Player	Number	Position	Destination club	Fee/notes	Ref

== Club ==
=== Direction ===
President	Eurico Miranda
1st Vice President	Fernando Horta
2nd Vice President, Vice President of Communication	Silvio Godoi
President Assessors	Carlos Alberto Valadares; João Carlos Nóbrega; Ricardo de Vasconcellos
Vice President of Football	José Luiz Moreira
Vice President of Judiciary	Paulo Sérgio dos Reis
Vice President of Finance	Marcos Pereira de Carvalho
Vice President of Medical	Egas Manoel Batista
Vice President of Patrimony	José Joaquim Cardoso
Vice President of Engineering and Patrimonial Work	André Luis Afonso
Vice President of Marketing	Marco Antônio Monteiro
Vice President of Social	Carlos Alberto Miranda
Vice President of Public Relations	Adriano José Neto
Vice President of Special Relations	Denis Carrega
Ground (capacity and dimensions)	Estádio São Januário (24,500 / 105x68m)
Vice President of Youths	José Mourão Gonçalves
Vice President of Court Sports	Fernando Antônio Portela
Vice President of Terrestrial Sports	Francisco Villanova
Vice President of Nautical Sports	Antônio Lopes Caetano
Vice President of Aquatic Sports	Walter Ramos

=== Council ===
President of Assembly	Itamar de Carvalho
Vice President of Assembly	Jaime Loureiro Baptista
President of Fiscal Council	Otto de Carvalho Junior
President of Meritorious Council	Nelson Ribeiro de Souza
Vice President of Meritorious Council	Marcos Pereira de Carvalho
President of Deliberative Council	Luis Manuel Fernandes
Vice President of Deliberative Council	Sérgio Eduardo Martins

=== Football Committee ===
Manager of Football (Senior)	Paulo Angioni
Head Coach	Jorginho
Auxiliar Coach (Head Coach' Personal)	Zinho
Physical Trainer (Head Coach' Personal)	Joelton Urtiga
Supervisor of Football	André Araújo
Coach Coordinator	Antônio Garcia
Auxiliar Coaches	Eduardo Barroca; Mauricio; Silveira; Valdir Bigode
Scientific Coordinator	Alex Evangelista
Physical Trainers	Fábio Ganime; Mauro Britto; Romildo Menezes
Goalkeeper Coach	Flavio Tenius
Masseurs	Márcio Jacó; Paulo Cesar; Sebastiao Freire
Wardrobes	Nilton Santos; Odilon
Tactical Analyst	Alberto Tenan; Cléber dos Santos; Pedro Monteiro
Press Agents	Nelson Costa; Vinicius Melo
Photographer	Paulo Fernandes
Shoemaker	Paulo Roberto
Driver	Edson Modesto
Psychologist	Maíra Ruas
Medicos	Albino; Alexsander Montenegro; Igor Rachid; Raphael Blum; Victor Baitelli; Vincenzo Giordano
Nutritionist	Mildre Freitas e Souza

== Match results ==
=== Pre-season ===
==== SuperSeries Tournament ====
===== Squad =====
Note: Flags indicate national team as defined under FIFA eligibility rules; some limited exceptions apply. Players may hold more than one non-FIFA nationality.

No.	Pos.	Nation	Player
1	GK	(Uruguay) URU	Martín Silva
2	MF	(Brazil) BRA	Jean Patrick
3	DF	(Brazil) BRA	Rodrigo
4	DF	(Brazil) BRA	Luan
5	MF	(Argentina) ARG	Pablo Guiñazú
6	DF	(Brazil) BRA	Christianno
7	MF	(Brazil) BRA	Bernardo
8	MF	(Brazil) BRA	Sandro Silva
9	FW	(Brazil) BRA	Rafael Silva
10	MF	(Brazil) BRA	Marcinho
11	MF	(Colombia) COL	Santiago Montoya

No.	Pos.	Nation	Player
12	GK	(Brazil) BRA	Jordi
13	DF	(Brazil) BRA	Anderson Salles
14	DF	(Brazil) BRA	Nei
15	DF	(Brazil) BRA	Douglas Silva
16	DF	(Brazil) BRA	Henrique
17	MF	(Brazil) BRA	Jhon Cley
18	MF	(Brazil) BRA	Lucas
19	FW	(Brazil) BRA	Marquinhos
20	MF	(Paraguay) PAR	Julio dos Santos
21	MF	(Brazil) BRA	Victor Bolt
22	FW	(Brazil) BRA	Yago

===== Table =====
Pos	Team	Pld	W	D	L	GF	GA	GD	Pts
1	Flamengo (C)	2	2	0	0	2	0	+2	6
2	São Paulo	2	1	0	1	2	2	0	3
3	Vasco da Gama	2	0	0	2	1	3	−2	0

(C) Champions

=== Overall ===
Competition	First match	Last match	Starting round	Final position	Record							
Competition	First match	Last match	Starting round	Final position	Pld	W	D	L	GF	GA	GD	Win %
Campeonato Carioca	1 February 2015	3 May 2015	Matchday 1	Winners	19	13	4	2	35	14	+21	68.42
Campeonato Brasileiro Série A	10 May 2015	6 December 2015	Matchday 1	18th	38	10	11	17	28	54	−26	26.32
Copa do Brasil	1 April 2015	30 September 2015	First stage	Quarterfinals	10	5	4	1	15	12	+3	50.00
Total					67	28	19	20	78	80	−2	41.79

Source: Competitions

==== Matches ====
21 January 2015	Flamengo	1–0	Vasco da Gama	Manaus
21:00 BST –1	Éverton 54'; Cáceres (yellow card) 22'; Anderson Pico (yellow card) 32'; Arthur Maia (yellow card) 32'	Report; Report	(yellow card) 30' Christianno; (yellow card) 42' Montoya	Stadium: Arena Vivaldo Lima (Arena da Amazônia); Attendance: 21,915; Referee: Edmar da Encarnação

23 January 2015	São Paulo	2–1	Vasco da Gama	Manaus
21:00 BST –1	Luís Fabiano 14' (yellow card) 56'; Souza 78' (yellow card) 89'; Edson Silva (yellow card) 30'; Toloi (red card)	Report; Report	33' (o.g.) Bruno; (yellow card) 34' Bernardo; (yellow card) 67' Rodrigo; (yellow card) 76' dos Santos; (yellow card) 84' Nei; (yellow card) 90+4' Victor Bolt	Stadium: Arena Vivaldo Lima (Arena da Amazônia); Attendance: 8,929; Referee: João Batista de Brito

=== Rio de Janeiro State Championship ===
==== Squad ====
The initial report was released on 27 January. The teams involved in the tournament are required to register a squad of a maximum 31 players in total, including 3 goalkeepers.

Note: Flags indicate national team as defined under FIFA eligibility rules; some limited exceptions apply. Players may hold more than one non-FIFA nationality.

No.	Pos.	Nation	Player
––	FW	(Brazil) BRA	Romarinho
––	MF	(Brazil) BRA	Índio (youth player)
––	DF	(Brazil) BRA	Aislan
––	DF	(Brazil) BRA	Mádson
––	MF	(Brazil) BRA	Paulista
––	DF	(Brazil) BRA	Rodrigo
––	DF	(Brazil) BRA	Douglas da Silva
––	DF	(Brazil) BRA	Luan
––	DF	(Brazil) BRA	Anderson Salles
––	FW	(Brazil) BRA	Rafael Silva
––	FW	(Brazil) BRA	Yago
––	DF	(Brazil) BRA	Henrique
––	DF	(Brazil) BRA	Christianno
––	MF	(Brazil) BRA	Sandro Silva
––	MF	(Brazil) BRA	Serginho
––	MF	(Brazil) BRA	Victor Bolt

No.	Pos.	Nation	Player
––	MF	(Brazil) BRA	Lucas
––	MF	(Brazil) BRA	Jhon Cley
––	MF	(Paraguay) PAR	Julio dos Santos
––	MF	(Colombia) COL	Santiago Montoya
––	MF	(Brazil) BRA	Bernardo
––	MF	(Brazil) BRA	Marcinho
––	FW	(Brazil) BRA	Thalles (youth player)
––	DF	(Brazil) BRA	Lorran (youth player)
––	MF	(Argentina) ARG	Pablo Guiñazú
––	FW	(Brazil) BRA	Gilberto
––	FW	(Brazil) BRA	Dagoberto
––	FW	(Brazil) BRA	Mosquito
––	GK	(Uruguay) URU	Martín Silva
––	GK	(Brazil) BRA	Jordi
––	GK	(Brazil) BRA	Charles

==== Guanabara Cup ====
===== Standings =====
Pos	Team	Pld	W	D	L	GF	GA	GD	Pts	Qualification or relegation
1	Botafogo	15	11	3	1	31	9	+22	36	Taça GB champions in Semifinals
2	Flamengo	15	11	3	1	31	9	+22	36	Advanced in Semifinals
3	Vasco da Gama (C)	15	10	3	2	31	13	+18	33	Advanced in Semifinals
4	Fluminense	15	10	1	4	29	15	+14	31	Advanced in Semifinals
5	Madureira	15	9	3	3	26	12	+14	30	

Source: GloboEsporte.com
(C) Champions

===== Matches =====
1 February 2015 1	Cabofriense	0–2	Vasco da Gama	Macaé, Rio de Janeiro
17:00 BDT	Hiroshi (yellow card) 72'	Report; Report	53' Bernardo; 90' Marcinho	Stadium: Estádio Cláudio Moacyr de Azevedo (Moacyrzão); Attendance: 4,982; Referee: Wagner do Nascimento Magalhaes

5 February 2015 2	Vasco da Gama	2–0	Madureira	Rio de Janeiro
21:00 BDT	Bernardo 3'; Marcinho 60'; Luan (yellow card) 13'; Christianno (yellow card) 29'; Montoya (yellow card) 56'	Report; Report	(yellow card) 40' Thiago Galhardo; (yellow card) 85' Thiago Cardoso	Stadium: Estádio Vasco da Gama (São Januário); Attendance: 7,285; Referee: Leonardo Cavaleiro

8 February 2015 3	Tigres do Brasil	1–1	Vasco da Gama	Duque de Caxias, Rio de Janeiro
19:30 BDT	Zé Carlos (yellow card) 75'; Paulinho Guará 54' (yellow card) 79'; Jean Carioca (yellow card) 90+1'; Santiago (yellow card) 90+4'	Report; Report	51' Rafael Silva; (yellow card) 37' Luan; (yellow card) 84' Serginho	Stadium: Estádio de Los Larios; Attendance: 2,730; Referee: Luis Antonio Silva dos Santos

12 February 2015 4	Vasco da Gama	3–0	Macaé	Rio de Janeiro
19:30 BDT	Bernardo 33'; Montoya 39' (yellow card) 60'; Rodrigo 86'; Guiñazú (yellow card) 18'; Jhon Cley (yellow card) 79'	Report; Report	(yellow card) 33' Brinner; (yellow card) 89' Pipico	Stadium: Estádio Vasco da Gama (São Januário); Attendance: 5,831; Referee: Rodrigo Carvalhaes

18 February 2015 5	Vasco da Gama	1–1	Barra Mansa	Rio de Janeiro
22:00 BDT	Rafael Silva 81'; Lorran (yellow card) 65'; Marcinho (yellow card) 84'; Bernardo (red card); Guiñazú (yellow card) 90'	Report; Report	54' Vitinho; (yellow card) 39' Walace; (yellow card) 72' Thiagão; (red card) André Duarte	Stadium: Estádio Vasco da Gama (São Januário); Attendance: Raphael Silvano Ferreira; Referee: 4,478

22 February 2015 6	Fluminense	0–1	Vasco da Gama	Rio de Janeiro
18:30 BST	Henrique (yellow card) 49'; Fred (yellow card) 79'; Rafinha (red card)	Report; Report	81' (pen.) Luan; (yellow card) 23' Guiñazú; (yellow card) 42' Gilberto; (yellow card) 82' Thalles; (yellow card) 84' Rodrigo	Stadium: Estádio Nilton Santos (Engenhão); Attendance: 8,658; Referee: Luis Antonio Silva dos Santos

28 February 2015 7	Vasco da Gama	2–0	Bangu	Rio de Janeiro
16:00 BST	Rodrigo 28' (yellow card) 27'; Luan 69' dos Santos (yellow card) 24'; Marcinho (yellow card) 44'; Gilberto (yellow card) 77'	Report; Report	(yellow card) 28' Iago; (yellow card) 49' Rafael Sales; (yellow card) 52' Raphael Augusto; (yellow card) 68' (yellow-red card) 76' Guilherme	Stadium: Estádio Vasco da Gama (São Januário); Attendance: 13,603; Referee: João Batista de Arruda

8 March 2015 8	Bonsucesso	0–1	Vasco da Gama	Rio de Janeiro
16:00 BST	Preto (yellow card) 67'; Fernando (yellow card) 72'; Julinho (yellow card) 85'	Report; Report	90+4' (pen.) Gilberto; (yellow card) 40' Christianno; (yellow card) 47' Guiñazú	Stadium: Estádio Nilton Santos (Engenhão); Attendance: 5,668; Referee: Daniel de Souza Macedo

12 March 2015 9	Vasco da Gama	2–0	Resende	Rio de Janeiro
19:30 BST	Gilberto 20'; Lorran (yellow card) 43'; Rodrigo (yellow card) 64'; Serginho (yellow card) 88'	Report; Report	(yellow card) 29' Marcel	Stadium: Estádio Vasco da Gama (São Januário); Attendance: 6,059; Referee: Lenilton Rodrigues Júnior

15 March 2015 10	Vasco da Gama	5–1	Nova Iguaçu	Rio de Janeiro
16:00 BST	Gilberto 12' (pen.); Luan 20'; Dagoberto 32'; Serginho 38'; Cleyton 71' (o.g.)	Report; Report	41' Marlon; (yellow card) 11' Anderson; (yellow card) 77' Jorge Fellipe	Stadium: Estádio Vasco da Gama (São Januário); Attendance: 13,098; Referee: Daniel de Souza Macedo

22 March 2015 11	Flamengo	2–1	Vasco da Gama	Rio de Janeiro
18:30 BST	Alecsandro 18', 53' (pen.) (yellow card) 53'; Marcelo Cirino (yellow card) 12'; Canteros (yellow card) 17'; Cáceres (yellow card) 59'; Wallace (yellow card) 67'; Éverton (yellow card) 74'; Paulinho (red card); Anderson Pico (red card)	Report; Report	29' (yellow card) 43' Gilberto; (yellow card) 13' Serginho; (yellow card) 52' (red card) 82' Guiñazú; (yellow card) 77' Christianno; (yellow card) 81' Rodrigo; (red card) Bernardo	Stadium: Estádio Jornalista Mário Filho (Maracanã); Attendance: 56,020; Referee: João Batista de Arruda

26 March 2015 12	Boavista	1–2	Vasco da Gama	Saquarema, Rio de Janeiro
18:30 BST	Erick Flores 52' (yellow card) 36'; Yago (yellow card) 45' (yellow-red card) 77'; Max Pardalzinho (yellow card) 58'; Willian Maranhão (yellow card) 70'; Gustavo (yellow card) 82'	Report; Report	55', 90+4' (pen.) Anderson Salles; (yellow card) 60' Lucas; (yellow card) 78' (yellow-red card) 79' Montoya; (yellow card) 78' Nei	Stadium: Estádio Eucy Resende de Mendonça (Bacaxá); Attendance: 2,392; Referee: Wagner do Nascimento Magalhaes

29 March 2015 13	Vasco da Gama	1–1	Botafogo	Rio de Janeiro
16:00 BST	Gilberto 44'; Mádson (yellow card) 25'; Serginho (yellow card) 32'; Guiñazú (yellow card) 32'	Report; Report	53' Roger Carvalho; (yellow card) 11' Gegê; (yellow card) 58' Bill; (yellow card) 85' Tássio	Stadium: Estádio Jornalista Mário Filho (Maracanã); Attendance: 25,047; Referee: Grazziani Maciel Rocha

5 April 2015 14	Friburguense	5–4	Vasco da Gama	Nova Friburgo, Rio de Janeiro
18:30 BST	Jorge Luiz 26', 45+2'; Lucas 29' (o.g.); Sérgio Gomes 40'; Felipe 77'; João Victor (yellow card) 16'; Cadão (yellow card) 42'	Report; Report	21' (pen.), 43' (pen.) (yellow card) 81' Gilberto; 54', 86' Lucas; (yellow card) 25' dos Santos; (yellow card) 31' Christianno	Stadium: Estádio Eduardo Guinle; Attendance: 4,400; Referee: Leonardo Cavaleiro

8 April 2015 15	Vasco da Gama	4–1	Volta Redonda	Rio de Janeiro
22:00 BST	Jhon Cley 55'; Luan 59'; Rafael Silva 75'; Marcinho 87'	Report; Report	66' Higor; (yellow card) 4' Bruno Barra	Stadium: Estádio Vasco da Gama (São Januário); Attendance: 3,098; Referee: Rodrigo Nunes de Sá

==== Super Clássicos Tournament ====
===== Standings =====
Pos	Team	Pld	W	D	L	GF	GA	GD	Pts	Qualification or relegation
1	Flamengo	3	2	0	1	5	2	+3	6	Super Clássicos Tournament champion
2	Vasco da Gama (C)	3	1	1	1	3	3	0	4	
3	Botafogo	3	1	1	1	3	4	−1	4	
4	Fluminense	3	1	0	2	3	5	−2	3	

Updated to match(es) played on 8 April 2015. Source: GloboEsporte.com
Rules for classification: 1st points; 2nd wins; 3rd goal difference; 4th goals scored; 5th head-to-head results; 6th least red cards received; 7th least yellow cards received; 8th draw.
(C) Champions

==== Semifinals ====
12 April 2015 First leg	Vasco da Gama	0–0	Flamengo	Rio de Janeiro
16:00 BST	Yago (yellow card) 42'; Christianno (yellow card) 56'; Gilberto (yellow card) 81'; Luan (yellow card) 88'	Report; Report	(yellow card) 11' Jonas; (yellow card) 50' Wallace; (yellow card) 50' Éverton; (yellow card) 54' Marcelo Cirino; (yellow card) 68' Anderson Pico; (yellow card) 72' Paulinho	Stadium: Estádio Jornalista Mário Filho (Maracanã); Attendance: 24,747; Referee: João Batista de Arruda

19 April 2015 Second leg	Flamengo	0–1 (0–1 agg.)	Vasco da Gama	Rio de Janeiro
16:00 BST	Pará (yellow card) 11'; Bressan (yellow card) 61'; Wallace 65'; Eduardo da Silva (yellow card) 90+3'	Report; Report	62' (pen.) (yellow card) 25' Gilberto; (yellow card) 28' Guiñazú; (yellow card) 32' Christianno; (yellow card) 55' dos Santos; (yellow card) 66' Dagoberto; (yellow card) 67' Rafael Silva; (yellow card) 90+3' Silva	Stadium: Estádio Jornalista Mário Filho (Maracanã); Attendance: 53,134; Referee: Rodrigo Nunes de Sá

==== Final ====
26 April 2015 First leg	Vasco da Gama	1–0	Botafogo	Rio de Janeiro
16:00 BST	Rafael Silva 90+2' (yellow card) 69'; Rodrigo (yellow card) 24'; Serginho (yellow card) 29'; Thalles (yellow card) 85'	Report; Report	(yellow card) 8' Thiago Carleto; (yellow card) 24' Bill; (yellow card) 70' Gilberto; (yellow card) 90+1' Marcelo Mattos	Stadium: Estádio Jornalista Mário Filho (Maracanã); Attendance: 45,488; Referee: Luis Antonio Silva dos Santos

3 May 2015 Second leg	Botafogo	1–2 (1–3 agg.)	Vasco da Gama	Rio de Janeiro
16:00 BST	Diego Jardel 75' (yellow card) 84'; Willian Arão (yellow card) 14'; Gilberto (yellow card) 20'; Marcelo Mattos (yellow card) 31'; Fernandes (yellow card) 35' (yellow-red card) 85'; Renan Fonseca (yellow card) 62'; Diego Giaretta (yellow card) 80'	Report; Report	45+1' Rafael Silva; 90+3' Gilberto; (yellow card) 10' Serginho; (yellow card) 11' dos Santos; (yellow card) 37' Christianno; (yellow card) 48' Dagoberto; (yellow card) 54' Rodrigo	Stadium: Estádio Jornalista Mário Filho (Maracanã); Attendance: 66,156; Referee: Wagner do Nascimento Magalhães

=== Copa do Brasil ===
==== First stage ====
1 April 2015 First leg	Rio Branco	1–2	Vasco da Gama	Rio Branco, Acre
17:30 BST –2	Kinho 81' (yellow card) 10'; Léo (yellow card) 54'; Joel (yellow card) 62'	Report; Report	2' Thalles; 45' Douglas Silva; (yellow card) 30' Victor Bolt; (yellow card) 40' Nei; (yellow card) 56' Bernardo	Stadium: Arena da Floresta; Attendance: 3,525 (paying); Referee: Rodrigo Batista Raposo

15 April 2015 Second leg	Vasco da Gama	3–2 (5–3 agg.)	Rio Branco	Rio de Janeiro
22:00 BST	Yago 47'; Thalles 63', 79'; Lucas (yellow card) 45+2'	Report; Report	43' Alexandre Matão; 72' Kinho; (yellow card) 45' Tiaguinho; (yellow card) 65' Diogo Marzagão; (yellow card) 89' Léo	Stadium: Estádio Vasco da Gama (São Januário); Attendance: 1,315; Referee: Flavio Rodrigues de Souza

==== Second stage ====
13 May 2015 First leg	Cuiabá	1–1	Vasco da Gama	Cuiabá
21:00 BST –1	Maninho 80'; Assis (yellow card) 53'; Bogé (yellow card) 90+1'	Report; Report	90+4' Rodrigo; (yellow card) 37' Rafael Silva; (yellow card) 38' Marcinho; (yellow card) 63' Serginho	Stadium: Arena Pantanal; Attendance: 7,611; Referee: Vinicius Gonçalves Dias Araujo

20 May 2015 Second leg	Vasco da Gama	0–0 (1(a)–1 agg.)	Cuiabá	Rio de Janeiro
22:00 BST	Rafael Silva (yellow card) 37'	Report; Report	(yellow card) 30' Serginho; (yellow card) 81' Gean; (yellow card) 81' Geovani Santos; (yellow card) 86' Égon	Stadium: Estádio Vasco da Gama (São Januário); Attendance: 1,864; Referee: Jailson Macedo Freitas

==== Third round ====
15 July 2015 First leg	Vasco da Gama	3–1	América de Natal	Rio de Janeiro
21:00 BST	Herrera 45+3'; Anderson Salles 63' (pen.); Biancucchi 79'; Dagoberto (yellow card) 47' (yellow-red card) 81'; Christianno (yellow card) 58'	Report; Report	53' Reis; (yellow card) 54' Flávio Boaventura; (yellow card) 90+3' Zé Antônio Pereira	Stadium: Estádio Vasco da Gama (São Januário); Attendance: 2,910; Referee: Thiago Duarte Peixoto

22 July 2015 Second leg	América de Natal	2–3 (3–6 agg.)	Vasco da Gama	Natal, Rio Grande do Norte
22:00 BST	Cascata 48' (pen.) (yellow card) 60'; Adriano Pardal 55' (yellow card) 69'; Flávio Boaventura (yellow card) 42'; Zé Antônio Pereira (yellow card) 90+2'	Report; Report	21', 45+1' Riascos; 76' Rafael Silva; (yellow card) 12' Aislan	Stadium: Arena das Dunas; Attendance: 17,122; Referee: Luis Teixeira Rocha

==== Round of 16 ====
19 August 2015 First leg	Flamengo	0–1	Vasco da Gama	Rio de Janeiro
22:00 BST	Wallace (yellow card) 14' (yellow-red card) 70'; Márcio Araújo (yellow card) 46'; Canteros (yellow card) 53'	Report; Report	58' Jorge Henrique; (yellow card) 2' dos Santos; (yellow card) 14' Riascos; (yellow card) 25' Nenê; (yellow card) 48' Anderson Salles; (yellow card) 68' Rodrigo; (yellow card) 86' Serginho; (yellow card) 88' Dagoberto; (yellow card) 90+3' Thalles; (yellow card) 90+3' Silva	Stadium: Estádio Mário Filho (Maracanã); Attendance: 34,844; Referee: Ricardo Marques Ribeiro

26 August 2015 Second leg	Vasco da Gama	1–1 (2–1 agg.)	Flamengo	Rio de Janeiro
22:00 BST	Rafael Silva 82' (yellow card) 83'; Anderson Salles (yellow card) 23'	Report; Report	6' (o.g.) Mádson; (yellow card) 4' Márcio Araújo; (yellow card) 20' Jorge; (yellow card) 45' Emerson; (yellow card) 81' (yellow-red card) 88' Pará	Stadium: Estádio Mário Filho (Maracanã); Attendance: 49,367; Referee: Wilton Pereira Sampaio

==== Quarterfinals ====
23 September 2015 First leg	São Paulo	3–0	Vasco da Gama	São Paulo
22:00 BST	Alexandre Pato 27', 37'; Luís Fabiano 76'	Report; Report	31' Rodrigo; (yellow card) 40' Silva	Stadium: Estádio Cícero Pompeu de Toledo (Morumbi); Attendance: 23,326; Referee: Wilton Pereira Sampaio

30 September 2015 Second leg	Vasco da Gama	1–1 (1–4 agg.)	São Paulo	Rio de Janeiro
22:00 BST	Riascos 17' (yellow card) 66'	Report; Report	60' Centurión; (yellow card) 30' Thiago Mendes; (yellow card) 68' Lucão	Stadium: Estádio Mário Filho (Maracanã); Attendance: 6,237; Referee: Marielson Alves Silva

=== Brasileirão Série A ===
==== Standings ====
Pos	Team	Pld	W	D	L	GF	GA	GD	Pts	Qualification or relegation
14	Chapecoense	38	12	11	15	34	44	−10	47	2016 Copa Sudamericana second stage (Note: Teams will enter in the 2016 Copa Sudamericana if they do not reach the 2016 Copa do Brasil round of 16. Also, the 2015 Copa Verde champion (Cuiabá) and the 2016 Copa do Nordeste champion have a guaranteed berth.)
15	Coritiba	38	11	11	16	31	42	−11	44	2016 Copa Sudamericana second stage
16	Figueirense	38	11	10	17	36	50	−14	43	2016 Copa Sudamericana second stage
17	Avaí (R)	38	11	9	18	38	60	−22	42	Relegation to 2016 Campeonato Brasileiro Série B
18	Vasco da Gama (R)	38	10	11	17	28	54	−26	41	Relegation to 2016 Campeonato Brasileiro Série B
19	Goiás (R)	38	10	8	20	39	49	−10	38	Relegation to 2016 Campeonato Brasileiro Série B
20	Joinville (R)	38	7	10	21	26	48	−22	31	Relegation to 2016 Campeonato Brasileiro Série B

Source: Soccerway.com
Rules for classification: 1) points; 2) wins; 3) goal difference; 4) goals scored; 5) head-to-head results; 6) least red cards received; 7) least yellow cards received; 8) draw.
(R) Relegated

==== Matches ====
10 May 2015 1	Vasco da Gama	0–0	Goiás	Rio de Janeiro
18:30 BST	Dagoberto (yellow card) 33'; Luan (yellow card) 39'; Christianno (yellow card) 69'	Report; Report	(yellow card) 33' Wesley; (yellow card) 40' Ygor; (yellow card) 52' Felipe Macedo; (yellow card) 83' Rafael Forster; (yellow card) 89' Alex Alves	Stadium: Estádio Vasco da Gama (São Januário); Attendance: 7,424; Referee: Braulio da Silva Machado

17 May 2015 2	Figueirense	0–0	Vasco da Gama	Florianópolis
11:00 BST	Thiago Heleno (yellow card) 90+2'; Leandro Silva (yellow card) 90+3'	Report; Report	(yellow card) 29' Serginho; (yellow card) 59' Rafael Silva; (yellow card) 65' Gilberto; (yellow card) 68' Dagoberto; (yellow card) 71' Silva; (yellow card) 77' Guiñazú	Stadium: Estádio Orlando Scarpelli; Attendance: 11,352; Referee: Thiago Duarte Fragoso

23 May 2015 3	Vasco da Gama	1–1	Internacional	Rio de Janeiro
18:30 BST	Lucas 81'; Guiñazú (yellow card) 34'; Serginho (yellow card) 42'; Dagoberto (yellow card) 63'; Yago (yellow card) 65'; Rodrigo (yellow card) 75'; Gilberto (yellow card) 75'	Report; Report	45+1' (yellow card) 12' Nilmar; (yellow card) 17' (yellow-red card) 67' Alan Ruschel; (yellow card) 84' Taiberson	Stadium: Estádio Vasco da Gama (São Januário); Attendance: 5,143; Referee: Dewson Fernando Freitas da Silva

31 May 2015 4	Atlético Mineiro	3–0	Vasco da Gama	Belo Horizonte
16:00 BST	Thiago Ribeiro 12', 44'; Dátolo 20'	Report; Report	(yellow card) 62' Rafael Silva; (yellow card) 79' Diguinho; (yellow card) 88' Yago	Stadium: Estádio Raimundo Sampaio (Independência); Attendance: 17,958; Referee: Alisson Sidnei Furtado

3 June 2015 5	Vasco da Gama	0–3	Ponte Preta	Rio de Janeiro
19:30 BST	Jordi (red card); Guiñazú (yellow card) 62'; Gilberto (yellow card) 87' (yellow-red card) 87'	Report; Report	1' Diego Oliveira; 39' Tiago Alves; 78' (yellow card) 78' Borges; (yellow card) 14' Felipe Azevedo; (yellow card) 23' Pablo	Stadium: Estádio Vasco da Gama (São Januário); Attendance: 2,894; Referee: Héber Roberto Lopes

6 June 2015 6	Atlético Paranaense	2–0	Vasco da Gama	Curitiba
22:00 BST	Nikão 60' (yellow card) 83'; Ytalo 90+2'; Eduardo (yellow card) 23'; Wéverton (yellow card) 76'; Walter (yellow card) 86'	Report; Report	(yellow card) 40' dos Santos; (yellow card) 59' Lucas; (yellow card) 79' Biancucchi	Stadium: Estádio Joaquim Américo Guimarães (Arena da Baixada); Attendance: 16,750; Referee: Marcelo Aparecido de Souza

13 June 2015 7	Vasco da Gama	1–3	Cruzeiro	Rio de Janeiro
21:00 BST	Rodrigo 88' (yellow card) 63'; Luan (yellow card) 62'	Report; Report	40', 75' (yellow card) 21' Leandro Damião; 59' Charles; (yellow card) 9' Pará; (yellow card) 58' Willians; (yellow card) 88' Joel Tagueu	Stadium: Estádio Vasco da Gama (São Januário); Attendance: 5,505; Referee: Leandro Pedro Vuaden

20 June 2015 8	Sport do Recife	2–1	Vasco da Gama	Recife
16:15 BST	André 20'; Wendel 81'; Samuel Xavier (yellow card) 73'; Samuel (yellow card) 83'	Report; Report	42' Riascos; (yellow card) 26' Guiñazú; (yellow card) 58' Biancucchi; (yellow card) 81' Luan	Stadium: Itaipava Arena Pernambuco; Attendance: 19,139; Referee: Anderson Daronco

28 June 2015 9	Vasco da Gama	1–0	Flamengo	Cuiabá
18:30 BST	Riascos 16'; Serginho (yellow card) 32'; Jhon Cley (yellow card) 34'; Charles (yellow card) 77'; Mádson (yellow card) 90+5'	Report; Report		Stadium: Arena Pantanal; Attendance: Héber Roberto Lopes; Referee: 16,602

1 July 2015 10	Vasco da Gama	1–0	Avaí	Rio de Janeiro
19:30 BST	Biancucchi 69'; Christianno (yellow card) 45+1'; Lucas (yellow card) 66'; Rodrigo (yellow card) 75'; Rafael Silva (red card)	Report; Report	(yellow card) HT' André Lima; (yellow card) 65' Emerson; (red card) Antônio Carlos	Stadium: Estádio Vasco da Gama (São Januário); Attendance: 8,008; Referee: Marcos Andre Gomes da Penha

4 July 2015 11	Chapecoense	1–0	Vasco da Gama	Chapecó
21:00 BST	Neto 75'; Bruno Rangel (yellow card) 43'	Report; Report	(red card) Christianno; (yellow card) 64' Guiñazú; (yellow card) 76' (yellow-red card) 78' Jhon Cley	Stadium: Arena Condá; Attendance: 4,349; Referee: Ricardo Marques Ribeiro

8 July 2015 12	Vasco da Gama	0–4	São Paulo	Brasília
22:00 BST	Anderson Salles (yellow card) 29'; Mádson (yellow card) 69'; Rodrigo (yellow card) 83'	Report; Report	13' Alexandre Pato; 18' Michel Bastos; 49' Wesley; 90+3' Boschilia	Stadium: Estádio Nacional de Brasília Mané Garrincha; Attendance: 15,812; Referee: Leandro Pedro Vuaden

11 July 2015 13	Grêmio Porto Alegrense	2–0	Vasco da Gama	Porto Alegre
18:30 BST	Anderson Salles 60' (o.g.); Pedro Rocha 82'; Walace (yellow card) 38'	Report; Report	(yellow card) 24' Guiñazú; (yellow card) 81' Andrezinho; (yellow card) 90+2' Serginho	Stadium: Arena do Grêmio; Attendance: 34,752; Referee: Luiz Flávio de Oliveira

19 July 2015 14	Fluminense	1–2	Vasco da Gama	Rio de Janeiro
16:00 BST	Marcos Júnior 59' (yellow card) 90+3'; Gerson (yellow card) 68'	Report; Report	40' Andrezinho; 71' (yellow card) 64' Jhon Cley; (yellow card) 14' Anderson Salles; (yellow card) 20' Christianno; (yellow card) 72' Dagoberto; (yellow card) 82' Jordi; (yellow card) 86' Serginho	Stadium: Estádio Mário Filho (Maracanã); Attendance: 41,764; Referee: Luiz Flávio de Oliveira

26 July 2015 15	Vasco da Gama	1–4	Palmeiras	Rio de Janeiro
18:30 BST	Riascos 69'; Rodrigo (yellow card) 10'; Dagoberto (yellow card) 21'; Mádson (yellow card) 86'	Report; Report	4', 55' Leandro Marcos; 18' Dudu; 35' (yellow card) 90+4' Víctor Ramos	Stadium: Estádio Vasco da Gama (São Januário); Attendance: 14,875; Referee: Anderson Daronco

29 July 2015 16	Corinthians Paulista	3–0	Vasco da Gama	São Paulo
22:00 BST	Renato Augusto 47'; Gil 61'; Elias 77'	Report; Report	(yellow card) 27' Serginho; (yellow card) 70' Luan; (yellow card) 87' Christianno	Stadium: Arena Corinthians; Attendance: 30,340 (paying); Referee: Leandro Pedro Vuaden

9 August 2015 17	Vasco da Gama	0–0	Joinville	Rio de Janeiro
11:00 BST	Anderson Salles (yellow card) 26'; Mádson (yellow card) 50'	Report; Report	(yellow card) 37' Marcelo Costa; (yellow card) 84' Marion; (yellow card) 90' Diego; (yellow card) 90+3' Kempes	Stadium: Estádio Mário Filho (Maracanã); Attendance: 41,581; Referee: Luiz Flávio de Oliveira

12 August 2015 18	Santos	1–0	Vasco da Gama	Santos, São Paulo
21:00 BST	Victor Ferraz 49'; Gabriel (yellow card) 39'; Marquinhos Gabriel (yellow card) 82'; Ricardo Oliveira (yellow card) 83'	Report; Report	(yellow card) 40' Serginho; (yellow card) 48' (yellow-red card) 81' Guiñazú; (yellow card) 68' Rafael Silva; (yellow card) 79' Herrera; (yellow card) 84' Thalles	Stadium: Estádio Urbano Caldeira (Vila Belmiro); Attendance: 12,038 (paying); Referee: Emerson Luiz Sobral

15 August 2015 19	Vasco da Gama	0–1	Coritiba	Rio de Janeiro
18:30 BST	Dagoberto (yellow card) 51'; Riascos (yellow card) 60'; Herrera (yellow card) 89'	Report; Report	90+3' Evandro; (yellow card) 40' Lúcio Flávio	Stadium: Estádio Mário Filho (Maracanã); Attendance: 10,657; Referee: Raphael Claus

22 August 2015 20	Goiás	3–0	Vasco da Gama	Goiânia
18:30 BST	Zé Eduardo 5' (yellow card) 34'; Erik 17' (pen.), 77' (pen.); Bruno Henrique (yellow card) 22'; Gimenez (yellow card) 26'	Report; Report	(yellow card) 16' (yellow-red card) 74' Rodrigo; (red card) Jorge Henrique; (yellow card) 45' Riascos; (yellow card) 83' Jhon Cley	Stadium: Estádio do Governo do Estado de Goiás (Serra Dourada); Attendance: 12,154; Referee: Luiz Flávio de Oliveira

29 August 2015 21	Vasco da Gama	0–1	Figueirense	Rio de Janeiro
18:30 BST	Guiñazú (yellow card) 44'; Luan (yellow card) 58'	Report; Report	90+4' Marcão; (yellow card) 45' Bruno Alves; (yellow card) 57' Marquinhos Pedroso; (yellow card) 71' Alex Muralha; (yellow card) 76' Yago	Stadium: Estádio Mário Filho (Maracanã); Attendance: 17,940; Referee: Francisco Carlos do Nascimento

2 September 2015 22	Internacional	6–0	Vasco da Gama	Porto Alegre
19:30 BST	Ernando 11'; Eduardo Sasha 40'; López 54', 90+2'; Valdívia 58'; Nílton 63' (yellow card) 82'; Vitinho (yellow card) 23'; Rafael Moura (yellow card) 73'	Report; Report	(yellow card) 64' Nenê	Stadium: Estádio José Pinheiro Borda (Beira-Rio); Attendance: 15,021; Referee: Ricardo Marques Ribeiro

5 September 2015 23	Vasco da Gama	1–2	Atlético Mineiro	Rio de Janeiro
19:30 BST	Nenê 74' (pen.); Jorge Henrique (yellow card) 47'; Lucas (yellow card) 48'; Rafael Silva (yellow card) 90+3' (yellow-red card) 90+3'	Report; Report	23' (pen.) Pratto; 43' (yellow card) 76' Dátolo; (yellow card) 86' Cárdenas	Stadium: Estádio Mário Filho (Maracanã); Attendance: 8,768; Referee: Elmo Alves Resende Cunha

9 September 2015 24	Ponte Preta	0–1	Vasco da Gama	Campinas
19:30 BST	Diego Oliveira (yellow card) 26' (yellow-red card) 60'; Gilson (yellow card) 32'; Ferron (yellow card) 57'	Report; Report	75' Leandrão; (yellow card) 25' Herrera	Stadium: Estádio Moisés Lucarelli (Majestoso); Attendance: 3,961 (paying); Referee: Diego Almeida Real

13 September 2015 25	Vasco da Gama	2–0	Atlético Paranaense	Rio de Janeiro
16:00 BST	Júlio César 5'; Nenê 48'; Silva (yellow card) 21'; Riascos (yellow card) 90+2'	Report; Report	(yellow card) 13' Ewandro; (yellow card) 50' Nikão	Stadium: Estádio Mário Filho (Maracanã); Attendance: 10,805; Referee: André Luiz de Freitas Castro

16 September 2015 26	Cruzeiro	2–2	Vasco da Gama	Belo Horizonte
22:00 BST	Willian 27'; Alisson (yellow card) 42'; Bruno Rodrigo (yellow card) 37'; Henrique (yellow card) 72'; Ceará (yellow card) 78'; Vinícius Araújo (yellow card) 90+2'	Report; Report	25', 81' Rafael Silva; (yellow card) 28' Rodrigo; (yellow card) 38' (yellow-red card) 90+1' dos Santos; (yellow card) 45+3' Serginho	Stadium: Estádio Governador Magalhães Pinto (Mineirão); Attendance: 19,888 (paying); Referee: Thiago Duarte Peixoto

20 September 2015 27	Vasco da Gama	2–1	Sport do Recife	Rio de Janeiro
16:00 BST	Nenê 2'; Rafael Vaz 49' (yellow card) 28'; Serginho (yellow card) 47'	Report; Report	40' Élber; (yellow card) 59' Renê; (yellow card) 75' Danilo	Stadium: Estádio Mário Filho (Maracanã); Attendance: 22,227; Referee: Héber Roberto Lopes

27 September 2015 28	Flamengo	1–2	Vasco da Gama	Rio de Janeiro
16:00 BST	Emerson 12' (yellow card) 45+5'; Márcio Araújo (yellow card) 4'; Guerrero (yellow card) 68'; Jorge (yellow card) 90+3'; Paulo Victor (yellow card) 90+3'	Report; Report	58' Rodrigo; 62' (pen.) (yellow card) 63' Nenê; (yellow card) 10' Luan; (yellow card) 64' dos Santos; (yellow card) 85' Lucas; (yellow card) 89' Mádson; (yellow card) 90+6' Júlio César	Stadium: Estádio Mário Filho (Maracanã); Attendance: 44,361; Referee: Leandro Pedro Vuaden

4 October 2015 29	Avaí	1–1	Vasco da Gama	Florianópolis
11:00 BST	André Lima 86'; Marquinhos (yellow card) 28'; Everton Silva (yellow card) 30'; Romário (yellow card) 53' (red card) 84'; Vagner (yellow card) 85'	Report; Report	45' Nenê; (yellow card) 3' Bruno Gallo; (yellow card) 54' Andrezinho; (yellow card) 73' Rafael Vaz; (red card) Jorge Henrique; (yellow card) 82' Silva; (red card) Rafael Silva	Stadium: Estádio Aderbal Ramos da Silva (Ressacada); Attendance: 14,582; Referee: Luís Teixeira Rocha

15 October 2015 30	Vasco da Gama	1–1	Chapecoense	Rio de Janeiro
19:30 BST	Rodrigo 73' (yellow card) 58'; Herrera (yellow card) 41'; Leandrão (yellow card) 74'; Romarinho (yellow card) 84'	Report; Report	85' (pen.) Bruno Rangel; (yellow card) 31' Dener; (yellow card) 63' Camilo; (yellow card) 68' Neto; (yellow card) 90+2' Thiego; (yellow card) 90+4' Danilo	Stadium: Estádio Mário Filho (Maracanã); Attendance: 25,983; Referee: Ricardo Marques Ribeiro

18 October 2015 31	São Paulo	2–2	Vasco da Gama	São Paulo
11:00 BDT	Luís Fabiano 2'; Rodrigo Caio 88'; Matheus Reis (yellow card) 22' (yellow-red card) 44'; Reinaldo (yellow card) 90+3'	Report; Report	45' Nenê; 63' Rodrigo; (yellow card) 48' Luan	Stadium: Estádio Cícero Pompeu de Toledo (Morumbi); Attendance: 18,349; Referee: Dewson Fernando Freitas da Silva

25 October 2015 32	Vasco da Gama	0–0	Grêmio Porto Alegrense	Rio de Janeiro
17:00 BDT	Bruno Gallo (yellow card) 86'	Report; Report	(yellow card) 2' Walace; (yellow card) 90+3' Fernandinho	Stadium: Estádio Mário Filho (Maracanã); Attendance: 20,207; Referee: Marcelo Aparecido Ribeiro de Souza

1 November 2015 33	Vasco da Gama	0–1	Fluminense	Rio de Janeiro
18:00 BDT	Bruno Gallo (yellow card) 37'; Éder Luís (yellow card) 88'	Report; Report	45+3' Gerson; (yellow card) 22' Gum; (yellow card) 74' Osvaldo; (yellow card) 74' (yellow-red card) 87' Higor; (yellow card) 85' Wellington Paulista; (yellow card) 86' Pierre	Stadium: Estádio Nilton Santos (Engenhão); Attendance: 13,755; Referee: Luiz Flávio de Oliveira

8 November 2015 34	Palmeiras	0–2	Vasco da Gama	São Paulo
17:00 BDT	Jackson (yellow card) 90+1'	Report; Report	35' Rafael Silva; 41' Nenê; (yellow card) 25' Riascos; (yellow card) 48' Luan; (yellow card) 50' Serginho; (yellow card) 78' Mádson	Stadium: Parque Allianz; Attendance: 28,800 (paying); Referee: Anderson Daronco

19 November 2015 35	Vasco da Gama	1–1	Corinthians Paulista	Rio de Janeiro
22:00 BDT	Júlio César 72'; Rodrigo (yellow card) 36' (yellow-red card) 62'; Diguinho (yellow card) 50'	Report; Report	82' Vágner Love; (yellow card) 49' Jádson; (yellow card) 59' Edílson; (yellow card) 87' Lucca	Stadium: Estádio Vasco da Gama (São Januário); Attendance: 19,225; Referee: Anderson Daronco

22 November 2015 36	Joinville	1–2	Vasco da Gama	Joinville
17:00 BDT	Rafael Donato 80' (yellow card) 40'; Domingues (yellow card) 42'; Lucas Crispim (yellow card) 53' (yellow-red card) 90+2'; Kempes (yellow card) 86'; Anselmo (yellow card) 90+1'	Report; Report	6' Nenê; 10' (yellow card) 87' Riascos; (yellow card) 78' Bruno Gallo; (yellow card) 90+2' Luan	Stadium: Arena Joinville; Attendance: 7,026; Referee: Marcelo Aparecido Ribeiro de Souza

29 November 2015 37	Vasco da Gama	1–0	Santos	Rio de Janeiro
18:00 BDT (Note: The match between Vasco da Gama and Santos was originally scheduled to be played on 29 November 2015, 17:00 BDT, but was postponed to one hour due to bad weather.)	Nenê 45' (pen.); Rafael Silva (yellow card) 74'; Andrezinho (yellow card) 80'; Rodrigo (yellow card) 90'	Report; Report	(yellow card) 38' Léo Cittadini; (yellow card) 44' Vanderlei	Stadium: Estádio Vasco da Gama (São Januário); Attendance: 11,618; Referee: Leandro Pedro Vuaden

6 December 2015 38	Coritiba	0–0	Vasco da Gama	Curitiba
17:00 BDT	Negueba (yellow card) 23'	Report; Report	(red card) Jorge Henrique	Stadium: Estádio Major Antônio Couto Pereira; Attendance: 13,228; Referee: Anderson Daronco

== Statistics ==
=== Appearances and goals ===
Last updated on 6 December 2015.

Players in italics have left the club during the season.

No.	Pos	Nat	Player	Total		Brasileirão Série A		Copa do Brasil		Rio de Janeiro State Championship		Other (Note: Includes appearances in SuperSeries and friendlies.)	
No.	Pos	Nat	Player	Apps	Goals	Apps	Goals	Apps	Goals	Apps	Goals	Apps	Goals
Goalkeepers
	GK	(Brazil) BRA	Charles	9	0	8+1	0	0	0	0	0	0	0
	GK	(Brazil) BRA	Jordi	15	0	9+1	0	3	0	2	0	0	0
	GK	(Uruguay) URU	Martín Silva	45	0	21	0	7	0	17	0	0	0
Defenders
	DF	(Brazil) BRA	Aislan	6	0	3+1	0	2	0	0	0	0	0
	DF	(Brazil) BRA	Anderson Salles	27	3	11+1	0	8	1	6+1	2	0	0
	DF	(Brazil) BRA	Bruno Ferreira	3	0	2+1	0	0	0	0	0	0	0
	DF	(Brazil) BRA	Bruno Teles	0	0	0	0	0	0	0	0	0	0
	DF	(Brazil) BRA	Christianno	44	0	20	0	6+1	0	17	0	0	0
	DF	(Brazil) BRA	Henrique	2	0	0	0	2	0	0	0	0	0
	DF	(Brazil) BRA	João Carlos	0	0	0	0	0	0	0	0	0	0
	DF	(Brazil) BRA	Jomar	5	0	3+1	0	1	0	0	0	0	0
	DF	(Brazil) BRA	Júlio César	27	2	23+1	2	1+2	0	0	0	0	0
	DF	(Brazil) BRA	Luan	44	4	25	0	3	0	16	4	0	0
	DF	(Brazil) BRA	Mádson	56	0	33	0	7	0	16	0	0	0
	DF	(Brazil) BRA	Nei	5	0	0	0	2	0	3	0	0	0
	DF	(Brazil) BRA	Rafael Vaz	10	1	4+5	1	1	0	0	0	0	0
	DF	(Brazil) BRA	Rodrigo	56	7	34	4	6	1	16	2	0	0
Midfielders
	MF	(Brazil) BRA	Andrezinho	22	1	16+5	1	1	0	0	0	0	0
	MF	(Argentina) ARG	Emanuel Biancucchi	10	2	4+3	1	2+1	1	0	0	0	0
	MF	(Brazil) BRA	Bruno Gallo	14	0	11+2	0	1	0	0	0	0	0
	MF	(Brazil) BRA	Diguinho	13	0	10+3	0	0	0	0	0	0	0
	MF	(Paraguay) PAR	Julio dos Santos	49	0	21+5	0	4+1	0	14+4	0	0	0
	MF	(Argentina) ARG	Pablo Guiñazú	43	0	19+2	0	9	0	13	0	0	0
	MF	(Brazil) BRA	Jean Patrick	5	0	2	0	1+1	0	0+1	0	0	0
	MF	(Brazil) BRA	Jéferson	0	0	0	0	0	0	0	0	0	0
	MF	(Brazil) BRA	Lucas	25	3	5+8	1	2	0	5+5	2	0	0
	MF	(Brazil) BRA	Mateus Vital	1	0	0+1	0	0	0	0	0	0	0
	MF	(Brazil) BRA	Serginho	51	1	24+2	0	7	0	18	1	0	0
	MF	(Chile) CHI	Felipe Seymour	1	0	0+1	0	0	0	0	0	0	0
Forwards
	FW	(Brazil) BRA	Dagoberto	18	1	9	0	2+1	0	4+2	1	0	0
	FW	(Brazil) BRA	Éder Luís	5	0	0+5	0	0	0	0	0	0	0
	FW	(Argentina) ARG	Germán Herrera	16	1	7+6	0	3	1	0	0	0	0
	FW	(Brazil) BRA	Jorge Henrique	16	1	13+1	0	2	1	0	0	0	0
	FW	(Brazil) BRA	Leandrão	11	1	10+1	1	0	0	0	0	0	0
	FW	(Brazil) BRA	Nenê	23	9	20	9	3	0	0	0	0	0
	FW	(Brazil) BRA	Rafael Silva	45	10	11+14	3	3+3	2	9+5	5	0	0
	FW	(Brazil) BRA	Renato Kayser	3	0	0+2	0	0+1	0	0	0	0	0
	FW	(Colombia) COL	Duvier Riascos	32	7	17+9	4	5+1	3	0	0	0	0
	FW	(Brazil) BRA	Romarinho	4	0	0+2	0	0+2	0	0	0	0	0
	FW	(Brazil) BRA	Thalles	30	3	1+12	0	4+4	3	2+7	0	0	0
Players of second squads who have made an appearance or had a squad number this season
	GK	(Brazil) BRA	Alessandro										
	GK	(Brazil) BRA	Diogo Silva										
	DF	(Brazil) BRA	Erick	0	0	0	0	0	0	0	0	0	0
	MF	(Brazil) BRA	Guilherme	0	0	0	0	0	0	0	0	0	0
	MF	(Brazil) BRA	Matheus Batista										
	MF	(Brazil) BRA	Sandro Silva	0	0	0	0	0	0	0	0	0	0
Players of youth squads who have made an appearance or had a squad number this season
	DF	(Brazil) BRA	Lorran	5	0	0	0	1	0	2+2	0	0	0
	MF	(Brazil) BRA	Índio	3	0	0	0	1+1	0	0+1	0	0	0
Players who have made an appearance or had a squad number this season but have transferred or loaned out during the season
	FW	(Brazil) BRA	Erick Luis										
	MF	(Brazil) BRA	Daniel	0	0	0	0	0	0	0	0	0	0
	GK	(Brazil) BRA	Rafael Copetti	0	0	0	0	0	0	0	0	0	0
	MF	(Brazil) BRA	Victor Bolt	2	0	0	0	1	0	1	0	0	0
	FW	(Brazil) BRA	Marquinhos	2	0	0	0	0	0	0+2	0	0	0
	MF	(Brazil) BRA	Paulista	0	0	0	0	0	0	0	0	0	0
	DF	(Brazil) BRA	Douglas da Silva	4	1	0	0	2	1	0+2	0	0	0
	MF	(Brazil) BRA	Marcinho	19	3	1+2	0	1+1	0	12+2	3	0	0
	MF	(Colombia) COL	Santiago Montoya	9	1	0	0	0+2	0	5+2	1	0	0
	FW	(Brazil) BRA	Yago	21	1	0+5	0	1+3	1	3+9	0	0	0
	FW	(Brazil) BRA	Mosquito	2	0	0	0	0+1	0	1	0	0	0
	MF	(Brazil) BRA	Bernardo	21	3	0+3	0	2+1	0	7+8	3	0	0
	FW	(Brazil) BRA	Gilberto	26	9	11+1	0	1	0	13	9	0	0
	MF	(Brazil) BRA	Jackson Caucaia	3	0	1+2	0	0	0	0	0	0	0
	MF	(Brazil) BRA	Jhon Cley	30	2	9+5	1	2+3	0	7+4	1	0	0
	DF	(Brazil) BRA	Nikolas Mariano										

=== Goalkeeper statistics ===
No.	Nat.	Player	Total			Brasileirão Série A			Copa do Brasil			Rio de Janeiro State Championship		
No.	Nat.	Player	PLD	GA	GAA	PLD	GA	GAA	PLD	GA	GAA	PLD	GA	GAA
	BRA	Charles	8+1	16	1.77	8+1	16	1.77						
	BRA	Jordi	14+1	23	1.53	9+1	18	1.80	3	4	1.33	2	2	1.00
	URU	Martín Silva	45	39	0.86	21	20	0.95	7	8	1.14	17	11	0.64
	BRA	Alessandro												
	BRA	Diogo Silva												
	BRA	Rafael Copetti												

Updated to match played 6 December 2015

Italic: denotes player is no longer with team

=== Top scorers ===
Ran	No.	Pos	Nat	Name	Brasileirão Série A	Copa do Brasil	Rio de Janeiro State Championship	Total
1		FW	(Brazil)	Rafael Silva	3	2	5	10
2		FW	(Brazil)	Gilberto			9	9
2		FW	(Brazil)	Nenê	9			9
4		DF	(Brazil)	Rodrigo	4	1	2	7
4		FW	(Colombia)	Duvier Riascos	4	3		7
6		DF	(Brazil)	Luan			4	4
7		DF	(Brazil)	Anderson Salles		1	2	3
7		MF	(Brazil)	Bernardo			3	3
7		MF	(Brazil)	Lucas	1		2	3
7		MF	(Brazil)	Marcinho			3	3
7		FW	(Brazil)	Thalles		3		3
12		DF	(Brazil)	Júlio César	2			2
12		MF	(Argentina)	Emanuel Biancucchi	1	1		2
12		MF	(Brazil)	Jhon Cley	1		1	2
15		DF	(Brazil)	Douglas Silva		1		1
15		DF	(Brazil)	Rafael Vaz	1			1
15		MF	(Brazil)	Andrezinho	1			1
15		MF	(Colombia)	Santiago Montoya			1	1
15		MF	(Brazil)	Serginho			1	1
15		FW	(Brazil)	Dagoberto			1	1
15		FW	(Argentina)	Germán Herrera		1		1
15		FW	(Brazil)	Jorge Henrique		1		1
15		FW	(Brazil)	Leandrão	1			1
15		FW	(Brazil)	Yago		1		1
15							1	1
				TOTALS	28	15	35	78

Last updated: 29 November 2015
Source: Competitive matches

Those in italics are no longer with club.

=== Top assistants ===
Ran	No.	Pos	Nat	Name	Brasileirão Série A	Copa do Brasil	Rio de Janeiro State Championship	Total
1		MF	(Brazil)	Bernardo		2	7	9
2		MF	(Brazil)	Jhon Cley	1	2	2	5
2		FW	(Brazil)	Nenê	4	1		5
4		DF	(Brazil)	Mádson	2		2	4
5		MF	(Brazil)	Andrezinho	3			3
5		FW	(Brazil)	Gilberto	1		2	3
7		MF	(Colombia)	Santiago Montoya			2	2
7		MF	(Brazil)	Serginho	2			2
7		DF	(Brazil)	Aislan		1		1
7		DF	(Brazil)	Anderson Salles			1	1
7		DF	(Brazil)	Christianno			1	1
7		MF	(Paraguay)	Julio dos Santos			1	1
7		MF	(Argentina)	Pablo Guiñazú			1	1
7		MF	(Brazil)	Jean Patrick			1	1
7		MF	(Brazil)	Lucas			1	1
7		FW	(Brazil)	Dagoberto	1			1
7		FW	(Brazil)	Jorge Henrique	1			1
7		FW	(Brazil)	Rafael Silva	1			1
7		FW	(Colombia)	Duvier Riascos		1		1
				TOTALS	16	6	21	44

Last updated: 22 November 2015
Source: Competitive matches

Those in italics are no longer with club.

=== Clean sheets ===
Ran	No.	Pos	Nat	Name	Brasileirão Série A	Copa do Brasil	Rio de Janeiro State Championship	Total
1		GK	(Uruguay)	Martín Silva	8	2	10	20
2		GK	(Brazil)	Charles	2			2
3		GK	(Brazil)	Jordi	1			1
4		GK	(Brazil)	Alessandro				
4		GK	(Brazil)	Diogo Silva				
4		GK	(Brazil)	Rafael Copetti				
				TOTALS	11	2	10	23

Last updated: 6 December 2015
Source: Competitive matches

Those in italics are no longer with club.

=== Disciplinary record ===
R	No.	Pos	Nat	Name	Brasileirão Série A			Copa do Brasil			Rio de Janeiro State Championship			Total		
R	No.	Pos	Nat	Name	Booked	(yellow card) (yellow-red card)	Sent off (straight red)	Booked	(yellow card) (yellow-red card)	Sent off (straight red)	Booked	(yellow card) (yellow-red card)	Sent off (straight red)	Booked	(yellow card) (yellow-red card)	Sent off (straight red)
1		DF	(Brazil)	Rodrigo	8	2	0	2	0	0	6	0	0	16	2	0
2		MF	(Argentina)	Pablo Guiñazú	7	1	0				7	0	1	14	1	1
2		MF	(Brazil)	Serginho	10	0	0	2	0	0	6	0	0	18	0	0
4		FW	(Brazil)	Rafael Silva	4	1	2	3	0	0	2	0	0	9	1	2
5		DF	(Brazil)	Christianno	4	0	1	1	0	0	7	0	0	12	0	1
6		DF	(Brazil)	Luan	9	0	0				3	0	0	12	0	0
7		FW	(Brazil)	Dagoberto	6	0	0	1	1	0	2	0	0	9	1	0
8		FW	(Brazil)	Gilberto	2	1	0				6	0	0	8	1	0
9		MF	(Paraguay)	Julio dos Santos	2	1	0	1	0	0	4	0	0	7	1	0
10		GK	(Uruguay)	Martín Silva	4	0	0	2	0	0	1	0	0	7	0	0
10		DF	(Brazil)	Mádson	6	0	0				1	0	0	7	0	0
10		FW	(Brazil)	Jorge Henrique	1	0	3							1	0	3
10		FW	(Colombia)	Duvier Riascos	5	0	0	2	0	0				7	0	0
14		MF	(Brazil)	Jhon Cley	3	1	0				1	0	0	4	1	0
14		MF	(Brazil)	Lucas	4	0	0	1	0	0	1	0	0	6	0	0
16		DF	(Brazil)	Anderson Salles	3	0	0	2	0	0				5	0	0
16		MF	(Brazil)	Bernardo				1	0	0	0	0	2	1	0	2
18		MF	(Brazil)	Bruno Gallo	4	0	0							4	0	0
18		MF	(Colombia)	Santiago Montoya							2	1	0	2	1	0
18		FW	(Argentina)	Germán Herrera	4	0	0							4	0	0
18		FW	(Brazil)	Thalles	1	0	0	1	0	0	2	0	0	4	0	0
22		GK	(Brazil)	Jordi	1	0	1							1	0	1
22		MF	(Brazil)	Andrezinho	3	0	0							3	0	0
22		MF	(Brazil)	Marcinho				1	0	0	2	0	0	3	0	0
22		FW	(Brazil)	Nenê	2	0	0	1	0	0				3	0	0
22		FW	(Brazil)	Yago	2	0	0				1	0	0	3	0	0
27		DF	(Brazil)	Lorran							2	0	0	2	0	0
27		DF	(Brazil)	Nei				1	0	0	1	0	0	2	0	0
27		DF	(Brazil)	Rafael Vaz	2	0	0							2	0	0
27		MF	(Argentina)	Emanuel Biancucchi	2	0	0							2	0	0
27		MF	(Brazil)	Diguinho	2	0	0							2	0	0
32		GK	(Brazil)	Charles	1	0	0							1	0	0
32		DF	(Brazil)	Aislan				1	0	0				1	0	0
32		DF	(Brazil)	Júlio César	1	0	0							1	0	0
32		MF	(Brazil)	Victor Bolt				1	0	0				1	0	0
32		FW	(Brazil)	Éder Luís	1	0	0							1	0	0
32		FW	(Brazil)	Leandrão	1	0	0							1	0	0
32		FW	(Brazil)	Romarinho	1	0	0							1	0	0
				TOTALS	107	7	7	24	1	0	57	1	3	188	9	10

Last updated: 6 December 2015
Source: Competitive matches

Those in italics are no longer with the club.

=== Captains ===
Last updated on 6 December 2015.

No.	Pos.	Name	Games
	MF	(Argentina) Pablo Guiñazú	41
	DF	(Brazil) Rodrigo	24
	DF	(Brazil) Luan	1
	FW	(Brazil) Nenê	1

=== Starting eleven ===
All competitions.

No.	Pos.	Nat.	Name	MS	Notes
	GK	(Uruguay)	Silva	32	Jordi has 10 starts Charles has 8 starts
	RB	(Brazil)	Mádson	41	Nei has 5 starts Jean Patrick has 2 starts Bruno has 1 start
	CB	(Brazil)	Luan	30	Anderson Salles has 24 starts Aislan has 5 starts Jomar has 3 starts
	CB	(Brazil)	Rodrigo	42	Douglas Silva has 2 starts
	LB	(Brazil)	Christianno	41	Lorran has 3 starts Henrique has 2 starts
	DM	(Brazil)	Serginho	39	Diguinho has 4 starts
	DM	(Argentina)	Guiñazú	40	Lucas has 11 starts Victor Bolt has 2 starts
	AM	(Brazil)	Dagoberto	15	Marcinho has 14 starts Nenê has 7 starts Andrezinho has 5 starts Biancucchi has 5 starts Índio has 1 start Mosquito has 1 start
	RW	(Paraguay)	dos Santos	30	Montoya has 5 starts Jackson Caucaia has 1 start
	ST	(Brazil)	Gilberto	25	Riascos has 16 starts Thalles has 7 starts Leandrão has 1 start
	LW	(Brazil)	Rafael Silva	19	Jhon Cley has 18 starts Bernardo has 9 starts Júlio César has 9 starts Jorge Henrique has 6 starts Herrera has 5 starts Yago has 4 starts

Last updated: 5 September 2015
Source: Squad statistics and Start formations
Only competitive matches.
Using the most used start formation.
Ordered by position on pitch (from back right to front left).

=== International call-ups ===
No.	P	Name	Country	Level	Caps	Goals	Opposition	Competition	Source
	GK	Martín Silva	Uruguay	Principal	Tot.	Tot.	vs. Morocco (28 March) vs. Guatemala (7 June) vs. Panama (5 September) vs. (Costa Rica) Costa Rica ✓ (9 September)	Friendlies	
	GK	Martín Silva	Uruguay	Principal	Tot.	Tot.	vs. Jamaica (13 June) vs. Argentina (17 June) vs. Paraguay (20 June) vs. Chile (25 June)	Copa América	
	GK	Martín Silva	Uruguay	Principal	Tot.	Tot.	vs. Bolivia (8 October) vs. Colombia (14 October) vs. Ecuador (12 November) vs. Chile (17 November)	World Cup qualification	
	DF	Lorran	Brazil	Under-20	Tot.	Tot.	vs. Chile (15 January – Group stage) vs. Uruguay (17 January – Group stage) vs. Venezuela (19 January – Group stage) vs. Colombia ✓ (23 January – Group stage) vs. Uruguay (26 January – Final Stage) vs. Paraguay (29 January – Final Stage) vs. Argentina (1 February – Final Stage) vs. Peru (4 February – Final Stage) vs. Colombia (7 February – Final Stage)	South American Youth Championship	
	DF	Luan	Brazil	Under-23	Tot.	Tot.	vs. Paraguay (27 March) vs. Mexico (29 March)	Friendlies	
	DF	Luan	Brazil	Under-23	Tot.	Tot.	vs. (Canada) Canada ✓ (13 July) vs. (Peru) Peru ✓ (16 July) vs. (Panama) Panama ✓ (20 July) vs. (Uruguay) Uruguay ✓ (23 July) vs. (Panama) Panama ✓ (25 July)	Pan American Games	
	FW	Thalles	Brazil	Under-20	Tot.	Tot.	vs. (Chile) Chile ✓ (15 January – Group stage) vs. (Uruguay) Uruguay ✓ (17 January – Group stage) vs. Venezuela (19 January – Group stage) vs. (Colombia) Colombia ✓ (23 January – Group stage) vs. (Uruguay) Uruguay ✓ (26 January – Final Stage) vs. (Paraguay) Paraguay ✓ (29 January – Final Stage) vs. (Argentina) Argentina ✓ (1 February – Final Stage) vs. (Peru) Peru ✓ (4 February – Final Stage) vs. (Colombia) Colombia ✓ (7 February – Final Stage)	South American Youth Championship	

== Honors ==
=== Individual ===
Position	Country	Player	Number	Award	Category	Result
FW	(Brazil)	Nenê		Prêmio Craque do Brasileirão	Fans' MVP	Won

== See also ==
- 2015 Rio de Janeiro State Championship
- 2015 Copa do Brasil
- 2015 Brasileirão Série A
