= Biancucchi =

Biancucchi is an Italian surname. Notable people with the surname include:

- Emanuel Biancucchi (born 1988), Argentine footballer, brother of Maxi
- Maxi Biancucchi (born 1984), Argentine footballer

== See also ==
- Biancucci
