= Jordi (footballer) =

Brazilian footballer

Personal information
- Full name: Jordi Martins Almeida
- Date of birth: 3 September 1993 (age 33)
- Place of birth: Volta Redonda, Brazil
- Height: 1.92 m (6 ft 3 1/2 in)
- Position: Goalkeeper

Team information
- Current team: Novorizontino
- Number: 93

Youth career
- 2006–2009: Volta Redonda
- 2009–2013: Vasco da Gama

Senior career*
Years	Team	Apps	(Gls)
2014–2020	Vasco da Gama	34	(0)
2018	→ Tractor (loan)	11	(0)
2019	→ CSA (loan)	29	(0)
2020–2023	Paços de Ferreira	38	(0)
2023–	Novorizontino	136	(0)
- * Club domestic league appearances and goals as of 17 November 2026

Jordi Martins Almeida (born 3 September 1993), known simply as Jordi, is a Brazilian footballer who plays as a goalkeeper for Novorizontino.

== Club career ==
Born in Volta Redonda, Rio de Janeiro, Jordi joined Vasco da Gama's youth setup in 2009, after starting out at Volta Redonda. On 10 September 2013, he signed a professional contract until 2016.

Jordi was promoted to the main squad in 2014, and acted mainly as a backup to new signing Martín Silva. He made his professional debut on 9 September, starting in a 2–0 home win against Luverdense for the Série B championship.

In his Série A debut on 3 June 2015, Jordi was sent off with only 29 minutes; his team would eventually finish with a 0–3 home defeat to Ponte Preta.

== Career statistics ==
As of match played 15 January 2025

Appearances and goals by club, season and competition
Club	Season	League			State league		National cup (Note: Includes Copa do Brasil, Hazfi Cup, Taça de Portugal)		League cup (Note: Includes Taça da Liga)		Continental		Other		Total	
Club	Season	Division	Apps	Goals	Apps	Goals	Apps	Goals	Apps	Goals	Apps	Goals	Apps	Goals	Apps	Goals
Vasco da Gama	2014	Série B	4	0	0	0	0	0	—		—		—		4	0
Vasco da Gama	2015	Série A	10	0	2 (Note: Appearance(s) in Campeonato Carioca)	0	3	0	—		—		—		15	0
Vasco da Gama	2016	Série B	12	0	1	0	1	0	—		—		—		14	0
Vasco da Gama	2017	Série A	1	0	3	0	0	0	—		—		—		4	0
Vasco da Gama	2018	Série A	0	0	0	0	0	0	—		0	0	—		0	0
Vasco da Gama	2019	Série A	0	0	0	0	0	0	—		—		—		0	0
Vasco da Gama	2020	Série A	0	0	1	0	0	0	—		0	0	—		1	0
Vasco da Gama	Total		27	0	7	0	4	0	—		0	0	—		38	0
Tractor (loan)	2017-18	Persian Gulf Pro League	11	0	—		0	0	—		5 (Note: Appearance(s) in AFC Champions League)	0	—		16	0
CSA (loan)	2019	Série A	29	0	0	0	0	0	—		—		0	0	29	0
Paços de Ferreira	2020-21	Primeira Liga	32	0	—		1	0	1	0	—		—		34	0
Paços de Ferreira	2021-22	Primeira Liga	0	0	—		0	0	0	0	0	0	—		0	0
Paços de Ferreira	2022-23	Primeira Liga	6	0	—		1	0	2	0	—		—		9	0
Paços de Ferreira	Total		38	0	—		2	0	3	0	0	0	—		43	0
Novorizontino	2023	Série B	33	0	1 (Note: Appearance(s) in Campeonato Paulista Série A2)	0	—		—		—		—		34	0
Novorizontino	2024	Série B	35	0	13 (Note: Appearance(s) in Campeonato Paulista Série A1)	0	—		—		—		—		48	0
Novorizontino	2025	Série B	0	0	1	0	0	0	—		—		—		1	0
Novorizontino	Total		68	0	15	0	0	0	—		0	0	—		83	0
Career total			173	0	22	0	6	0	3	0	5	0	0	0	209	0

== Honours ==
Vasco

- Campeonato Carioca: 2015, 2016
- Taça Guanabara: 2019

Novorizontino

- Campeonato Brasileiro Série B: 2026
