= Romarinho (footballer, born 1993) =

Brazilian footballer (born 1993)

Personal information
- Full name: Romário de Souza Faria Filho
- Date of birth: 20 September 1993 (age 33)
- Place of birth: Barcelona, Spain
- Height: 1.76 m (5 ft 9 in)
- Position: Forward

Team information
- Current team: UCSA Tarasivka
- Number: 11

Youth career
- 2007–2012: Vasco da Gama

Senior career*
Years	Team	Apps	(Gls)
2013–2014	Brasiliense	10	(1)
2015	Vasco da Gama	2	(0)
2016	Zweigen Kanazawa	5	(0)
2017	Macaé	4	(0)
2017	Tupi	14	(1)
2018	Figueirense	3	(0)
2019	Tupi	8	(1)
2019	Maringá	4	(0)
2020	Joinville	7	(0)
2021	Novo Hamburgo	5	(0)
2022	Icasa	0	(0)
2023	Blumenau	5	(0)
2023	Atlético Catarinense	0	(0)
2023–2024	Club Destroyers	0	(0)
2024–2025	América-RJ	14	(4)
2025–2026	UCSA Tarasivka	16	(0)
2026–	América-RJ	0	(0)

Managerial career
- 2026–: América-RJ (chairman)
- * Club domestic league appearances and goals as of 24 December 2025

Romário de Souza Faria Filho (born 20 September 1993), commonly known as Romarinho, is a Brazilian footballer who has played as a forward for UCSA Tarasivka. He made two substitute appearances for Vasco da Gama in the 2015 Campeonato Brasileiro Série A, but spent most of his career in the lower leagues of Brazilian football. He currently plays at América-RJ.

== Club career ==
Born in Barcelona, Spain, Romarinho joined Vasco da Gama's youth setup in 2007. On 5 December 2012, he rescinded with the club, and moved to Brasiliense a day later.

Romarinho made his senior debuts during the 2013 campaign, scoring a goal in the year's Campeonato Brasiliense 3–0 win over Brasília. On 5 January 2015 he left Brasiliense, and immediately returned to his first club Vasco.

Romarinho was part of the squad that won the 2015 Rio de Janeiro state championship and made his Campeonato Brasileiro Série A debut on 29 August 2015, coming on as a late substitute for Julio dos Santos in a 0–1 home loss against Figueirense.

At the end of 2015, Romarinho agreed to spend the upcoming year with Zweigen Kanazawa in the J. League Division 2, and he returned to a contract at Macaé for the 2017 Campeonato Carioca. At its conclusion, he joined Tupi for the year's Série C campaign, He scored just once in his spell in Minas Gerais, a consolation in a 3–2 home loss to Bragantino on 9 September.

In December 2017, Romarinho signed for Figueirense. He played only three matches as they won the Campeonato Catarinense, scoring on 24 January to win the home game against Brusque. Despite his low involvement – partially due to competition from Henan – his contract was extended to the end of the year, taking in the Alvinegro team's Série B campaign.

Romarinho returned to Tupi in January 2019. Three months later, after finishing the 2019 Campeonato Mineiro with eight games and one goal, he signed for Maringá for the 2019 Campeonato Brasileiro Série D.

On 9 December 2019, Romarinho returned to Santa Catarina, joining Joinville for the upcoming state league season.

For 2021, Romarinho transferred to Campeonato Gaúcho side Novo Hamburgo. He played five state league games before leaving for personal reasons on 26 March.

In January 2022, Romarinho signed with Icasa of the Campeonato Cearense for the year. Having played just 25 minutes, he left by mutual consent in March before the Série D season began.

== Personal life ==
Romarinho's father, Romário, is also a footballer and a forward. He too was brought through the youth system at Vasco. In 2024, aged 58, his father came out of retirement and was registered as a player-president for America in the 2024 Campeonato Carioca Série A2 to play alongside Romarinho.

== Honours ==
Brasiliense

- Campeonato Brasiliense: 2013

Vasco da Gama

- Campeonato Carioca: 2015

Figueirense

- Campeonato Catarinense: 2018

Joinville

- Copa Santa Catarina: 2020
