= Biancucci =

Biancucci is an Italian surname. Notable people with the surname include:

- Paolo Biancucci (1583–1653), Italian Baroque painter
- Robert Biancucci, Australian Paralympic athlete
- Maxi Biancucchi (born 1984), Argentine footballer
- Vincent A. Biancucci (1940–2018), American politician
