= Diguinho =

Brazilian footballer (born 1983)

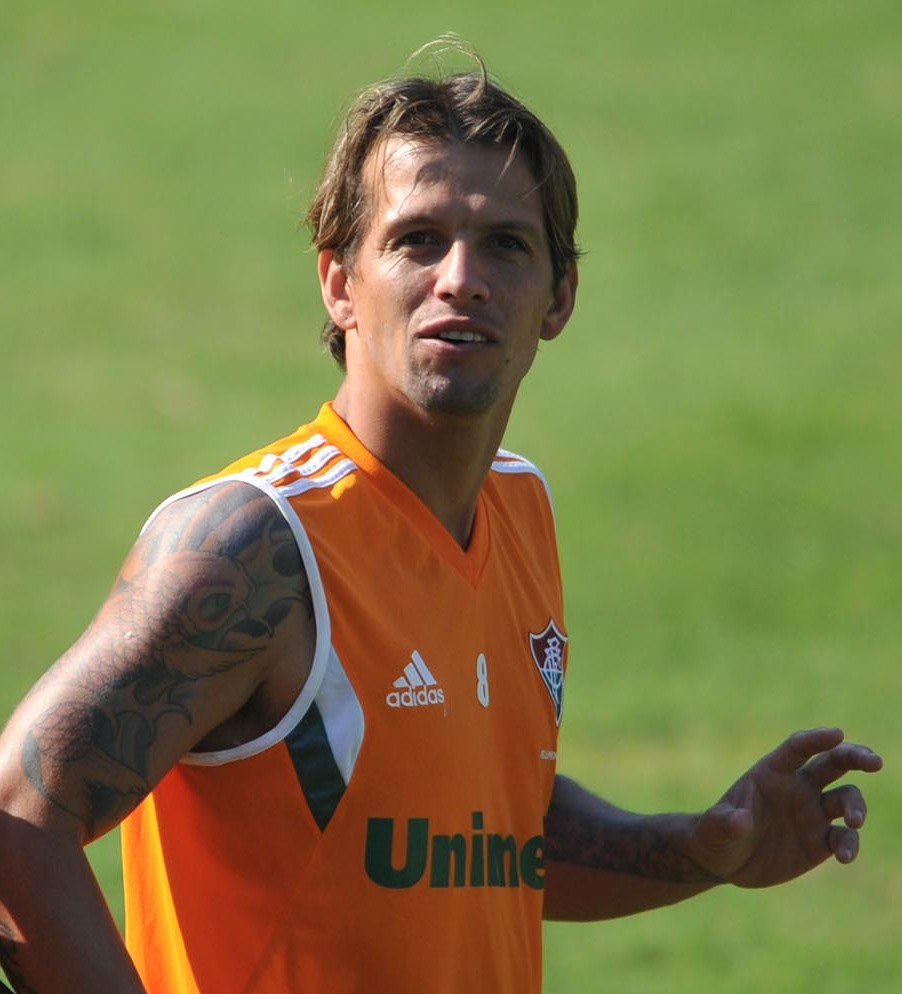
- Diguinho with Fluminense in 2014

Personal information
- Full name: Rodrigo Oliveira de Bittencourt
- Date of birth: 20 March 1983 (age 43)
- Place of birth: Canoas, Brazil
- Height: 1.71 m (5 ft 7 in)
- Position: Defensive midfielder

Youth career
- 1999–2000: Internacional
- 2000–2002: Cruzeiro-RS
- 2002–2003: Cruzeiro

Senior career*
Years	Team	Apps	(Gls)
2004	Canoas	0	(0)
2005–2008	Mogi Mirim	3	(0)
2005–2008	→ Botafogo (loan)	174	(4)
2009–2014	Fluminense	220	(2)
2015–2017	Vasco da Gama	45	(0)
2018	São Paulo-RS	7	(0)
2018	Aimoré	18	(0)
2019–2020	São José	40	(1)
- * Club domestic league appearances and goals as of 25 November 2020

Rodrigo Oliveira de Bittencourt (born 20 March 1983), nicknamed Diguinho, is a Brazilian retired footballer who played as a defensive midfielder.

He played for Fluminense from 2009 to 2014 where he won two league titles. He also took part in the final of the 2009 Copa Sudamericana against LDU Quito of Ecuador.

== Honours ==
Botafogo

- Campeonato Carioca: 2006

Fluminense

- Campeonato Carioca: 2012
- Série A: 2010, 2012

Vasco da Gama

- Campeonato Carioca: 2016
