= Yago Rocha =

Brazilian footballer

Personal information
- Full name: Yago da Silva Rocha
- Date of birth: 22 May 1994 (age 32)
- Place of birth: São Gonçalo, Brazil
- Height: 1.81 m (5 ft 11 in)
- Position: Right back

Team information
- Current team: Operário Ferroviário

Senior career*
Years	Team	Apps	(Gls)
2014–2017	Sampaio Corrêa	30	(0)
2015–2015	→ Boavista SC (loan)	17	(0)
2017	→ Tupi (loan)	1	(0)
2017–2018	Bonsucesso	9	(0)
2018–2019	Olaria	11	(0)
2019	Goiânia	8	(0)
2019–2021	Goiás	15	(0)
2020	→ Náutico (loan)	3	(0)
2021	Tombense	13	(0)
2022	Floresta	13	(0)
2023–	Operário Ferroviário	23	(0)
- * Club domestic league appearances and goals as of 8 October 2023

Yago da Silva Rocha (born 22 May 1994) is a Brazilian professional footballer who plays as a right back for Operário Ferroviário.

== Professional career ==
Yago made his professional debut with Boavista SC in a 1-0 Campeonato Carioca loss to Botagofo on 31 January 2015.
