= Jean Patrick =

Brazilian footballer

Personal information
- Full name: Jean Patrick Reis
- Date of birth: 25 June 1992 (age 34)
- Place of birth: São Miguel do Iguaçu, Brazil
- Height: 1.72 m (5 ft 7 1/2 in)
- Positions: Defensive midfielder; right back

Youth career
- 2006-2011: Real Nelci
- 2011–2012: Grêmio

Senior career*
Years	Team	Apps	(Gls)
2012	Mixto	1	(0)
2012	Rondonópolis		
2013	Rio Verde	11	(1)
2013	Sorriso		
2014–2016	Luverdense	61	(8)
2015	→ Vasco da Gama (loan)	7	(0)
2016	→ Rio Claro (loan)	11	(1)
2017	Albirex Niigata	2	(1)
2017	Ponte Preta	8	(1)
2018	Novorizontino	22	(0)
2018	→ Fortaleza (loan)	18	(1)
2019	Cuiabá	29	(5)
2020	Sport	6	(1)
2020	Cuiabá	15	(0)
2021–2022	CRB	47	(2)
2022	→ Remo (loan)	9	(0)
2023	ABC	11	(0)
- * Club domestic league appearances and goals as of 7 September 2023

Jean Patrick Reis (born 25 June 1992), commonly known as Jean Patrick, is a Brazilian footballer who plays as a defensive midfielder or right back.

== Career ==
In January 2017, Jean Patrick joined J1 League club Albirex Niigata from Brazilian Série B club Luverdense, after they lost their midfield linchpin Léo Silva.
