= Anderson Salles =

Brazilian footballer (born 1988)

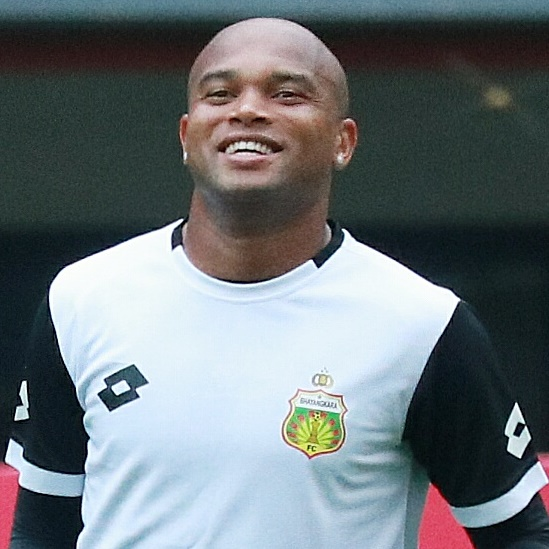
- Salles with Bhayangkara in 2019

Personal information
- Full name: Anderson Aparecido Salles
- Date of birth: 16 February 1988 (age 38)
- Place of birth: Araçariguama, Brazil
- Height: 1.81 m (5 ft 11 in)
- Position: Centre-back

Team information
- Current team: Cianorte

Youth career
- 2005–2008: Santos

Senior career*
Years	Team	Apps	(Gls)
2008–2009	Santos	6	(0)
2009	→ Juventus-SP (loan)		
2009	→ Bragantino (loan)	2	(0)
2010–2014	Ituano	62	(19)
2012	→ Grêmio Barueri (loan)	29	(2)
2014–2015	Vasco da Gama	22	(2)
2016	Goiás	29	(1)
2017	Santa Cruz	38	(8)
2018	Novorizontino	6	(0)
2018	São Bento	21	(2)
2019–2020	Bhayangkara	33	(7)
2020–2021	Ferroviária	10	(2)
2021	Paraná	3	(0)
2021–2024	Bhayangkara	95	(12)
2025–	Cianorte	0	(0)
- * Club domestic league appearances and goals as of 30 April 2024

Anderson Aparecido Salles (born 16 February 1988) is a Brazilian professional footballer who plays as a centre-back for Cianorte.

He made his professional debut for Santos in the São Paulo State Championship against Palmeiras on January 20, 2008.

== Honours ==
=== Club ===
Ituano

- Campeonato Paulista: 2014

Vasco da Gama

- Campeonato Carioca de Futebol: 2015

Goiás

- Campeonato Goiano: 2016

=== Individual ===
- Liga 1 Team of the Season: 2019 (Substitutes)
- APPI Indonesian Football Award Best 11: 2021–22
- APPI Indonesian Football Award Best Defender: 2021–22
