= Serginho (footballer, born May 1980) =

Brazilian footballer

Personal information
- Full name: Sérgio Simões de Jesus
- Date of birth: 20 May 1980 (age 46)
- Place of birth: Itabuna, Brazil
- Height: 1.78 m (5 ft 10 in)
- Position: Defensive midfielder

Youth career
- 1997–2000: Sãocarlense

Senior career*
Years	Team	Apps	(Gls)
2000–2001	Sãocarlense		
2002	Inter-SM		
2003	Mixto		
2004	Juventus-SP		
2004–2005	Guarani	14	(1)
2005	Rio Branco-SP		
2006–2007	Paraná	16	(0)
2007–2008	São Bernardo		
2008	Comercial-SP		
2008	Juventus-SP		
2009	Monte Azul		
2009	Atlético Sorocaba		
2010	Paletra São Bernardo		
2010	Rio Branco-AC	5	(0)
2011	Juventus-SP	10	(3)
2012	Ypiranga-RS	2	(0)
2012	Aparecidense	3	(0)
2012	Taubaté	0	(0)
2013–2014	Água Santa	1	(0)
2014	Taubaté	0	(0)
2015	Cuiabá	7	(0)
2016–2018	Água Santa	15	(0)

Managerial career
- 2021: Água Santa U20
- 2022–2025: Água Santa (assistant)
- 2022: Água Santa (interim)
- 2025: Água Santa (interim)
- * Club domestic league appearances and goals

Sérgio Simões de Jesus (born 20 May 1980), commonly known as Serginho, is a Brazilian football coach and former player who played as a defensive midfielder.
