= Christianno =

Brazilian footballer (born 1991)

Personal information
- Full name: Christianno Andrey de Araújo Vieira
- Date of birth: 29 September 1991 (age 35)
- Place of birth: Rio de Janeiro, Brazil
- Height: 1.84 m (6 ft 0 in)
- Position: Left back

Team information
- Current team: EC Pelotas

Youth career
- 2007–2010: Flamengo
- 2011: Avaí

Senior career*
Years	Team	Apps	(Gls)
2012	Flamengo de Guarulhos	3	(0)
2012–2013	Mogi Mirim	8	(0)
2013	Paulista	0	(0)
2014–2016	Bangu	13	(1)
2014	→ Vila Nova (loan)	30	(4)
2015	→ Vasco da Gama (loan)	37	(0)
2016	Sport	4	(0)
2016	Marítimo	0	(0)
2016	Vila Nova	5	(0)
2016	Boavista	10	(0)
2017	Luverdense	2	(0)
2017	Boa Esporte	10	(1)
2018	Boavista	6	(0)
2019–2020	America RJ	7	(1)
2020	Botafogo PB	14	(0)
2021	America RJ	5	(1)
2021	Paraná	8	(0)
2021–2022	São Caetano	11	(1)
2023	São José EC	0	(0)
2023	EC São Luiz		
2024–	EC Pelotas		
- * Club domestic league appearances and goals as of 02:14, 26 March 2024 (UTC)

Christianno Andrey de Araújo Vieira (born 29 September 1991), simply known as Christianno, is a Brazilian footballer who plays as a left back for EC Pelotas.

== Career ==
=== Flamengo de Guarulhos ===
Christianno made his league debut against Sertãozinho on 29 March 2012.

=== Mogi Mirim ===
Christianno made his league debut against Cerâmica on 24 June 2012.

=== Paulista ===
Christianno scored on his debut in the Copa Paulista against Ituano on 20 July 2013, scoring in the 90th+2nd minute.

=== Bangu ===
Christianno made his league debut against Friburguense on 18 January 2014.

=== First loan spell at Vila Nova ===
Christianno made his league debut against Luverdense on 18 April 2014. He scored his first goal for the club against ABC on 24 August 2014, scoring in the 45th+3rd minute.

=== Vasco da Gama ===
Christianno made his league debut against Cabofriense on 1 February 2015.

=== Sport Recife ===
Christianno made his league debut against River on 25 February 2016.

=== Marítimo ===
On 29 June 2016, Christianno signed a three-year deal with C.S. Marítimo.

=== First spell at Boavista RJ ===
Christiano made his league debut against Flamengo on 28 January 2017.

=== Luverdense ===
Christiano made his league debut against Goiás on 8 July 2017.

=== Boa ===
Christiano made his league debut against Atlético Mineiro on 18 January 2018. He scored his first goal for the club against Villa Nova on 21 January 2018, scoring in the 6th minute.

=== Second spell at Boavista RJ ===
Christiano made his league debut against Resende FC on 20 January 2019."Boavista RJ vs Resende - 20 January 2019". Soccerway.

=== First spell at America RJ ===
Christiano made his league debut against Americano on 28 December 2019. He scored his first goal for the club against Americano on 25 January 2020, scoring in the 11th minute.

=== Botafogo PB ===
Christiano made his league debut against Santa Cruz on 23 August 2020.

=== Second spell at America RJ ===
Christiano made his league debut against Sampaio Corrêa FE on 16 January 2021. He scored his first goal for the club against Cabofriense on 6 February 2021, scoring in the 64th minute.

=== Paraná ===
Christiano made his league debut against FC Cascavel on 14 March 2021.

=== São Caetano ===
Christiano made his league debut against Monte Azul on 26 January 2022. He scored his first goal for the club against Velo Clube on 13 March 2022, scoring in the 24th minute.
