= Jhon Cley =

Brazilian footballer (born 1994)

Personal information
- Full name: Jhon Cley Jesus Silva Coelho
- Date of birth: 9 March 1994 (age 32)
- Place of birth: Brasília, Brazil
- Height: 1.80 m (5 ft 11 in)
- Positions: Attacking midfielder; forward

Team information
- Current team: PT Satun

Senior career*
Years	Team	Apps	(Gls)
2012–2015	Vasco da Gama	57	(3)
2015–2017	Al-Qadsiah	7	(0)
2016–2017	→ Goiás (loan)	13	(0)
2018	Boa Esporte	10	(0)
2018–2020	CSA	21	(4)
2019–2020	→ Marítimo (loan)	10	(1)
2021	Caxias	13	(1)
2021–2022	Brusque	23	(1)
2022	Figueirense	27	(4)
2023–2024	Cong An Hanoi	20	(11)
2023–2024	→ Hoang Anh Gia Lai (loan)	7	(1)
2024–2025	Bekasi City	15	(3)
2025	Persis Solo	15	(2)
2025	Confiança	4	(0)
2025–2026	Dong Thap	10	(2)
2026–	PT Satun	0	(0)

International career
2013	Brazil U20	3	(0)
- * Club domestic league appearances and goals as of 8 March 2026

Jhon Cley Jesus Silva Coelho (born 9 March 1994) is a Brazilian professional footballer who plays as an attacking midfielder or forward for Thai League 2 club PT Satun.

He also played for Marítimo in the Primeira Liga.

== Honours ==
Vasco de Gama

- Campeonato Carioca: 2015

Goiás

- Campeonato Goiano: 2016

CSA

- Campeonato Alagoano: 2019

Figueirense

- Recopa Catarinense: 2022

Cong An Hanoi

- V.League 1: 2023
