= Marcinho (footballer, born 1984) =

Brazilian footballer

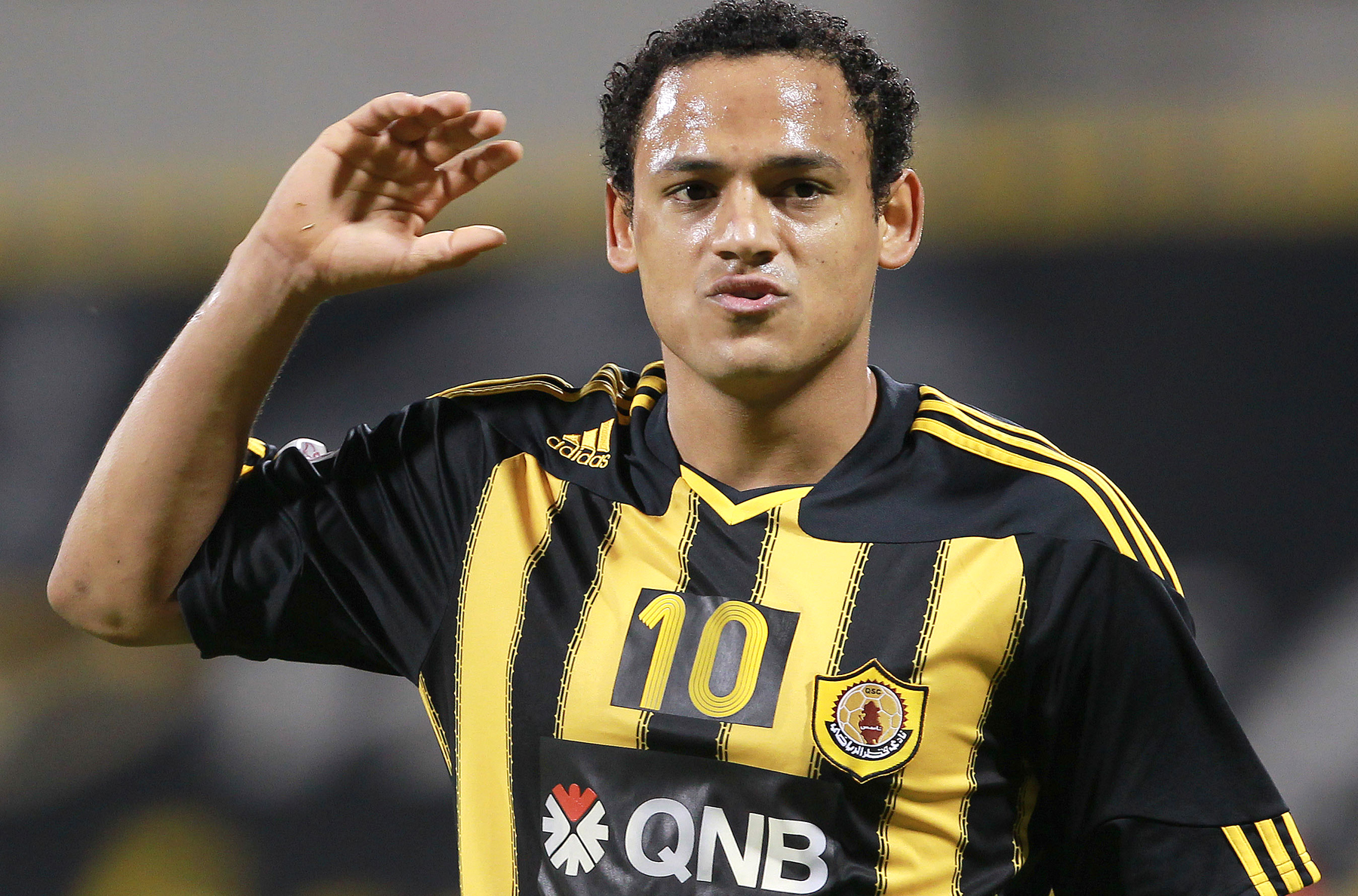
- Marcinho playing for Qatar SC

Personal information
- Full name: Márcio José de Oliveira
- Date of birth: 20 July 1984 (age 42)
- Place of birth: Irapuã, Brazil
- Height: 1.71 m (5 ft 7 in)
- Position: Attacking midfielder

Youth career
- 2001–2002: Cruzeiro

Senior career*
Years	Team	Apps	(Gls)
2003–2004	Cruzeiro	45	(8)
2005	→ Grêmio (loan)	23	(2)
2005–2006	Gençlerbirliği	6	(0)
2006–2007	Atlético Mineiro	58	(9)
2008	→ Flamengo (loan)	11	(7)
2008–2014	Qatar SC	72	(19)
2014–2015	Vitória	23	(3)
2015	Vasco da Gama	3	(0)
2016	Itumbiara	0	(0)
2016	Santa Cruz	1	(0)
Total		242	(48)
- * Club domestic league appearances and goals

Márcio José de Oliveira (born 20 July 1984), or simply Marcinho, is a Brazilian former professional footballer who played as an attacking midfielder.

== Career ==
Marcinho was born in Irapuã. He began his career with Cruzeiro and was part of the squad that won the Brazilian Cup and Brasileirao double in 2003. In 2005, he transferred to Grêmio.

In July 2005, he had his first foreign league experience, joining Gençlerbirliği in the Turkish Super Lig. However, by December of the same year he had only made 5 appearances, only starting once. Facing a lack of opportunities, Marcinho returned to Brazil in January 2006 wearing the shirt of Atlético Mineiro. He was an instrumental player for "O Galo" in that campaign, scoring 7 goals and helping the club return to the top flight.

In 2008, Marcinho arrived in Flamengo and had a very productive season. He made 38 appearances and was the team's top scorer with 17 goals. His most notable performances were; a hat trick against Figueirense (5-0), goal and assist against Santos, and two goals in the Copa Libertadores round of 16 against Club América (4-2). Despite a stellar performance in the first leg away from home, Flamengo suffered a 3-0 defeat in the Maracanã Stadium and were eliminated. Marcinho left the club halfway through the 2008 season, having won the 2008 Campeonato Carioca.

Marcinho signed with Qatar SC and played at the club until 2014.

For 2014-15 season he played with Vitoria.

== Career statistics ==
Appearances and goals by club, season and competition
Club	Season	League			State League (Note: Includes Campeonato Carioca.)		National cup		Continental (Note: Includes Copa Libertadores.)		Total	
Club	Season	Division	Apps	Goals	Apps	Goals	Apps	Goals	Apps	Goals	Apps	Goals
Flamengo	2008	Série A	11	7	19	5			8	5	38	17
Career total			11	7	19	5			8	5	38	17

== Honours ==
Cruzeiro

- Série A: 2003
- Brazilian Cup: 2003
- Campeonato Mineiro: 2003, 2004

Atlético Mineiro

- Série B: 2006
- Campeonato Mineiro: 2007

Flamengo

- Taça Guanabara: 2008
- Campeonato Carioca: 2008

Vasco da Gama

- Campeonato Carioca: 2015
