= Rafael Silva (footballer, born 1990) =

Brazilian footballer

Personal information
- Full name: Rafael Feital da Silva Souza
- Date of birth: 8 October 1990 (age 36)
- Place of birth: Feira de Santana, Brazil
- Height: 1.82 m (6 ft 0 in)
- Position: Forward

Team information
- Current team: São Bento
- Number: 11

Youth career
- 2007–2010: Portuguesa

Senior career*
Years	Team	Apps	(Gls)
2010–2013	Portuguesa	0	(0)
2012	→ Noroeste (loan)	0	(0)
2012	→ Gil Vicente (loan)	6	(1)
2013	→ São Carlos (loan)	14	(1)
2013–2014	Ituano	13	(1)
2014–2015	Vasco da Gama	39	(4)
2016–2017	Cruzeiro	2	(0)
2017	→ Hatta Club (loan)	11	(3)
2017	→ Guarani (loan)	8	(0)
2018	Dalian Transcendence	23	(9)
2019	Barito Putera	28	(14)
2020–2021	Always Ready	13	(3)
2021	Al-Shorta	7	(3)
2021	Madura United	12	(6)
2021–2023	Barito Putera	36	(17)
2023	Ituano	10	(1)
2023–2024	Sri Pahang	7	(3)
2024–2025	Portuguesa-RJ	8	(1)
2025–	São Bento	5	(0)
- * Club domestic league appearances and goals as of 1 March 2025

Rafael Feital da Silva Souza (born 8 October 1990), known as Rafael Silva, is a Brazilian professional footballer who plays as a forward for Campeonato Paulista Série A2 club São Bento.

== Honours ==
=== Club ===
Ituano

- Campeonato Paulista: 2014

Vasco da Gama

- Campeonato Carioca: 2015
