= Yago (footballer, born 1994) =

Brazilian footballer

Personal information
- Full name: Yago Moreira Silva
- Date of birth: 28 April 1994 (age 32)
- Place of birth: Cachoeiro de Itapemirim, Brazil
- Height: 1.72 m (5 ft 7 1/2 in)
- Position: Winger

Youth career
- 2006–2014: Vasco da Gama

Senior career*
Years	Team	Apps	(Gls)
2012–2016	Vasco da Gama	25	(1)
2015	→ Minnesota United (loan)	11	(0)
2016	→ Macaé (loan)	1	(0)
2016	→ Criciúma (loan)	0	(0)
2016	→ Tupi (loan)	4	(0)
2017	Macaé	3	(0)
2017	Seoul E-Land	3	(0)

International career
2011	Brazil U17		
- * Club domestic league appearances and goals as of 1 July 2017

Yago Moreira Silva or simply Yago (born 28 April 1994) is a Brazilian footballer who plays as a winger.
