= Emanuel Biancucchi =

Argentine footballer (born 1988)

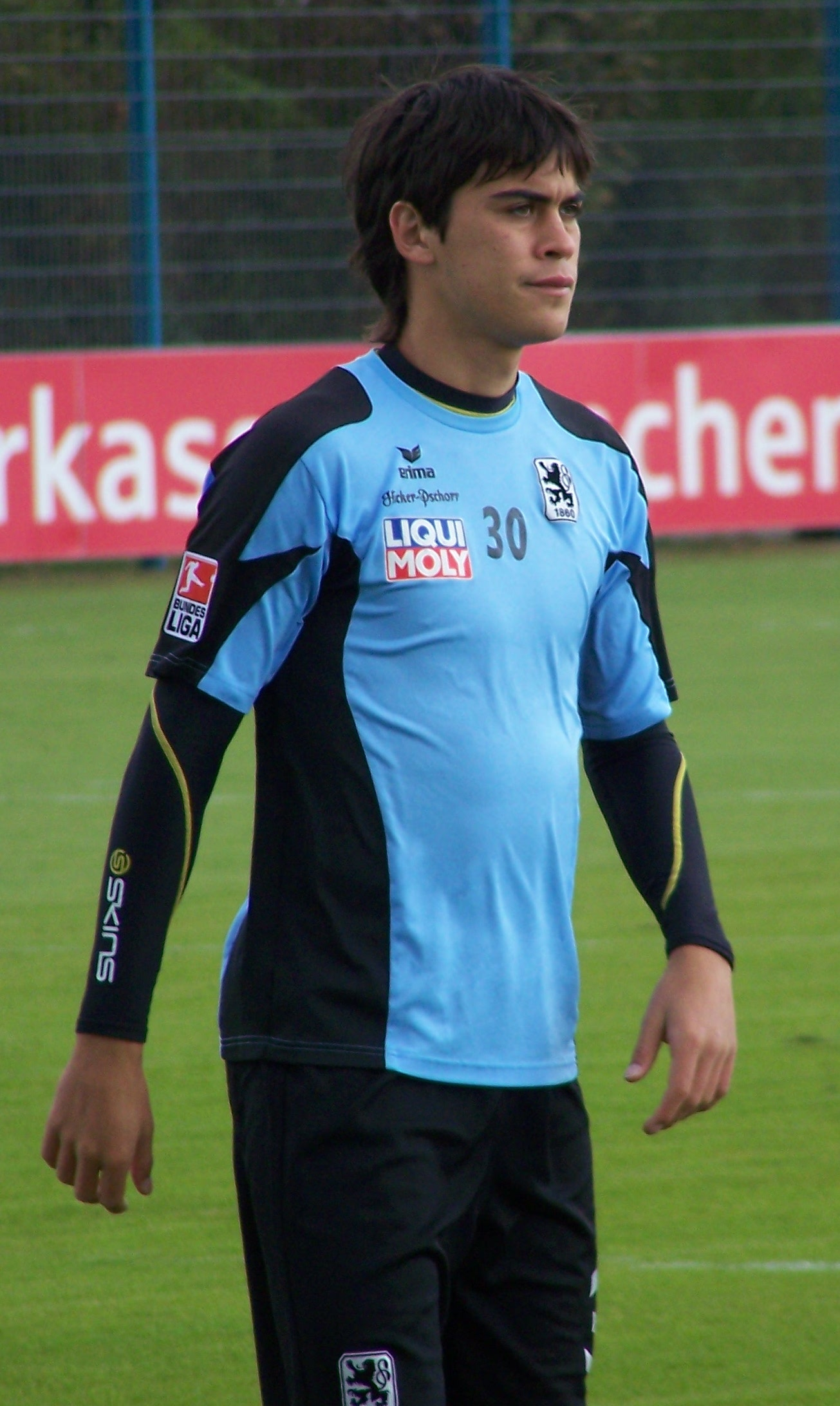
- Biancucchi training with 1860 Munich in 2009

Personal information
- Full name: Emanuel Biancucchi Cuccittini
- Date of birth: 28 July 1988 (age 38)
- Place of birth: Rosario, Argentina
- Height: 1.77 m (5 ft 10 in)
- Position: Midfielder

Youth career
- 2006–2008: Newell's Old Boys

Senior career*
| Years | Team | Apps | (Gls) |
| 2008–2010 | 1860 Munich II | 7 | (0) |
| 2009–2011 | 1860 Munich | 15 | (0) |
| 2011 | Girona | 0 | (0) |
| 2011–2012 | Independiente Asunción | 49 | (9) |
| 2013 | Olimpia | 6 | (0) |
| 2014 | Bahia | 23 | (2) |
| 2015 | Vasco da Gama | 7 | (1) |
| 2016 | Ceará | 5 | (0) |
| 2017 | Rubio Ñu | 6 | (1) |
| 2017 | General Díaz | 8 | (0) |
| 2018 | Melgar | 33 | (5) |
| 2019 | Newell's Old Boys | 0 | (0) |
| 2020–2021 | Vila Nova | 28 | (4) |
| 2022 | Resende | 10 | (2) |
| 2022 | Tacuary | 12 | (1) |
- * Club domestic league appearances and goals as of 3 December 2025

Emanuel Biancucchi Cuccittini (born 28 July 1988) is an Argentine former professional footballer who played as a midfielder.

== Career ==
A youth product of Newell's Old Boys, Biancucchi moved to Germany in 2008 to join 2. Bundesliga club 1860 Munich.

In January 2011, he joined Serie A club Cesena for a trial period, but transferred to Girona FC in the Segunda División instead, but he still has a valid contract with 1860.

== Personal life ==
Emanuel Biancucchi is the cousin of Inter Miami forward Lionel Messi (the son of his mother's sister) and the younger brother of retired forward Maximiliano Biancucchi. He also has Italian citizenship, and is represented by his uncle (Jorge Messi, Lionel's father).
