= Julio dos Santos =

Paraguayan footballer (born 1983)

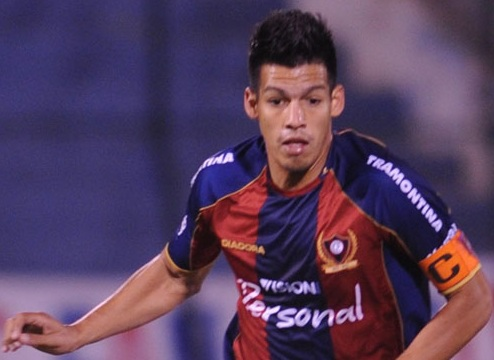
- Julio dos Santos in 2012

Personal information
- Full name: Julio Daniel dos Santos Rodríguez
- Date of birth: 7 May 1983 (age 43)
- Place of birth: Asunción, Paraguay
- Height: 1.89 m (6 ft 2 in)
- Positions: Attacking midfielder; central midfielder

Senior career*
Years	Team	Apps	(Gls)
2001–2005	Cerro Porteño	91	(28)
2006–2008	Bayern Munich II	3	(2)
2006–2008	Bayern Munich	5	(0)
2007	→ VfL Wolfsburg (loan)	0	(0)
2007	→ Almería (loan)	0	(0)
2008	→ Grêmio (loan)	5	(0)
2008–2009	Atlético Paranaense	21	(2)
2009–2014	Cerro Porteño	171	(41)
2015–2017	Vasco da Gama	41	(0)
2017–2018	Sportivo Luqueño	31	(8)
2019–2021	Cerro Porteño	7	(0)
2022	Presidente Hayes	0	(0)
Total		375	(81)

International career
2003	Paraguay U20	4	(1)
2004–2014	Paraguay	32	(3)
- * Club domestic league appearances and goals

Julio Daniel dos Santos Rodríguez (born 7 May 1983) is a Paraguayan former footballer.

He played usually in the hole-position, and sometimes as a second striker.

== Club career ==
Born in Asunción, Dos Santos started his professional career with Cerro Porteño, before eventually moving to Bayern Munich of Germany, in January 2006. He was elected Paraguayan Footballer of the Year in 2005 by national newspaper Diario ABC Color. Upon his arrival in Munich, he was touted as a long-term successor to Michael Ballack, but faced stiff competition from Iran's Ali Karimi. Eventually, both players struggled to break into the starting lineup.

In the first half of 2006–07 Bundesliga season, Bayern's leadership publicly stated its impatience with Dos Santos' progress. Club coach Felix Magath said: "It is clear that Julio's development does not please us, It does not make sense to keep a player at the club who does not create". This led to widespread rumours of his departure from the club; the speculation ended in December 2006, when Bayern announced they had reached a deal to send the player on loan to fellow Bundesliga side VfL Wolfsburg for the remainder of the season. Having failed to break into Wolfsburg's first team (mainly due to a major injury), he returned to Bayern in June.

At the conclusion of the 2006–07 season, Dos Santos had made four league appearances, as well as one appearance in the 2006–07 DFB-Pokal and two appearances in the 2006–07 UEFA Champions League.

However, after the arrivals of Franck Ribéry, Hamit Altıntop, José Sosa and Zé Roberto, it soon became clear that he would again struggle to find a place in the first team. Ottmar Hitzfeld, who had replaced Magath as Bayern manager by that time, stated that the club sought to sell dos Santos. Therefore, he would split 2007–08 between Almería (with no first-team appearances) and Grêmio.

In June 2008, dos Santos signed with Atlético Paranaense, also from Brazil.

In June 2009, Julio went back to his original club Cerro Porteño to play in the 2009 Clausura and the Copa Sudamericana.

On 29 December 2014, Julio dos Santos joined Brazilian club Vasco da Gama.

Before signing with Sportivo Luqueño, dos Santos rejected the opportunity to sign with Olimpia Asunción – being Cerro Porteño's rival – thanking the club's president for interest in him, but stating that his Cerro-ism would not permit him to join Olimpia.

== International career ==
A Paraguayan international since 2004, dos Santos appeared for the nation at the 2006 FIFA World Cup in two matches, assisting for the first goal against Trinidad and Tobago (2–0). He played the 2007 Copa America but has not been called up for the World Cup Qualifiers.

== See also ==
- Players and Records in Paraguayan Football
