= Maxi Biancucchi =

Argentine footballer

Personal information
- Full name: Maximiliano Daniel Biancucchi Cuccittini
- Date of birth: 15 September 1984 (age 42)
- Place of birth: Rosario, Argentina
- Height: 1.64 m (5 ft 5 in)
- Position: Forward

Youth career
- San Lorenzo

Senior career*
Years	Team	Apps	(Gls)
2001–2002	San Lorenzo	2	(0)
2002–2004	Libertad	2	(0)
2005	General Caballero	14	(2)
2005	Tacuary	10	(0)
2006	Fernando de la Mora	16	(6)
2007	Sportivo Luqueño	19	(8)
2007–2009	Flamengo	45	(5)
2010–2013	Cruz Azul	26	(3)
2011–2012	→ Olimpia (loan)	62	(12)
2013	Vitória	23	(11)
2014–2015	Bahia	48	(7)
2016	Olimpia	4	(1)
2017	Ceará	1	(0)
2017	Rubio Ñu	16	(1)
- * Club domestic league appearances and goals

Maximiliano Daniel Biancucchi Cuccittini (born 15 September 1984), is an Argentine former professional footballer who played as a forward.

== Career ==
=== Early career ===
Biancucchi started his career playing for San Lorenzo of Argentina. He also played for Paraguayan clubs, including Sportivo Luqueño, where he won the 2006–07 Apertura Championship of the Liga Paraguaya, before joining Brazilian club Flamengo, in July 2007.

=== Flamengo ===
Biancucchi played his first match as a Flamengo player on 5 August 2007, a Brazilian Série A match against Santos at Estádio Vila Belmiro, in which he came on as a substitute for Roger. And scored his first goal in a 1–0 win over rivals Fluminense in the 2007 Brazilian Série A.

Maxi ranks sixteenth in a number of appearances by a foreigner for Flamengo in the club's history.

=== Cruz Azul ===
Biancucchi joined Cruz Azul of Mexico in 2010. Maxi scored his first goal for Cruz Azul against Deportivo Toluca. After he scored another goal against Tigres. He later scored 2 goals for Cruz Azul on the 2010–11 CONCACAF Champions League.

=== Vitória ===
On 15 January 2013, Biancucchi signed with Vitória, returning to Brazilian football after about four years.

=== Bahia ===
He and his brother Emanuel joined Bahia on 9 January 2014.

=== Ceará ===
Biancucchi started playing for Ceará on 16 January 2017.

== Personal life ==
He is the cousin of Lionel Messi (the son of his mother's sister) and as a result is often nicknamed El primo de Messi ("Messi's cousin"). He is the older brother of Emanuel Biancucchi.

== Career statistics ==
As of 18 September 2014

Appearances and goals by club, season and competition
Club	Season	League		Cup		Continental		State and Regional League		Total	
Club	Season	Apps	Goals	Apps	Goals	Apps	Goals	Apps	Goals	Apps	Goals
General Caballero	2005	14	2							14	2
Tacuary	2005	10	0							10	0
Fernando de la Mora	2006	16	6							16	6
Sportivo Luqueño	2007	19	8							19	8
Flamengo	2007	17	2							17	2
Flamengo	2008	23	3	0	0	1	0	11	1	35	4
Flamengo	2009	5	0	1	1	1	0	10	0	17	1
Flamengo	Total	45	5	1	1	2	0	21	1	69	7
Cruz Azul	2009–10	15	2	0	0	4	0			19	2
Cruz Azul	2010–11	11	1	0	0	0	0			11	1
Cruz Azul	Total	26	3	0	0	4	0			30	3
Olimpia (loan)	2011	34	6	0	0	2	0			36	6
Olimpia (loan)	2012	28	6	0	0	8	1			36	7
Olimpia (loan)	Total	62	12	0	0	10	1			72	13
Vitória	2013	23	11	3	0	2	0	14	6	42	17
Bahia	2014	22	3	5	1	1	0	11	0	39	4
Bahia	2015	26	4	2	0	2	2	22	9	52	15
Bahia	Total	48	7	7	1	3	2	33	9	91	19
Career Total		263	54	11	2	21	3	68	16	373	75

== Honours ==
Sportivo Luqueño

- Liga Paraguaya Apertura: 2007

Flamengo

- Taça Guanabara: 2008
- Taça Rio: 2009
- Campeonato Carioca: 2009
- Série A: 2009

Olimpia

- Liga Paraguaya Clausura: 2011

Vitória

- Campeonato Baiano: 2013

Ceará

- Campeonato Cearense: 2017
