= Martín Silva =

Uruguayan footballer (born 1983)

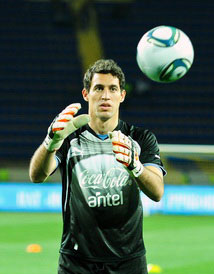
- Silva with Uruguay in 2011

Personal information
- Full name: Martín Andrés Silva Leites
- Date of birth: 25 March 1983 (age 43)
- Place of birth: Montevideo, Uruguay
- Height: 1.87 m (6 ft 2 in)
- Position: Goalkeeper

Senior career*
| Years | Team | Apps | (Gls) |
| 2002–2011 | Defensor Sporting | 212 | (0) |
| 2011–2013 | Olimpia | 83 | (1) |
| 2014–2018 | Vasco da Gama | 131 | (0) |
| 2019–2025 | Libertad | 206 | (0) |

International career
| 1998–1999 | Uruguay U17 | 31 | (0) |
| 2001–2003 | Uruguay U20 | 39 | (0) |
| 2009–2019 | Uruguay | 11 | (0) |
Medal record
Representing Uruguay
Copa América
| Winner | 2011 Argentina |
- * Club domestic league appearances and goals as of 12 August 2025

Martín Andrés Silva Leites (born 25 March 1983) is a Uruguayan professional footballer who plays as a goalkeeper.

== Club career ==
=== Defensor Sporting ===
Silva has played most of his professional career in Defensor Sporting, starting in 2002.

=== Olimpia ===
In August 2011, he signed a four-year contract with Paraguayan club Olimpia. He made his league debut for the club on 7 August 2011, going the full ninety in a 4-0 home victory over 3 de Febrero. Silva scored his first league goal for the club on 9 December 2012, scoring a penalty in the 53rd minute of a 1-0 victory over Sol de América. In November 2013, Silva controversially rescinded his contract with Olimpia after a successful Copa Libertadores and being loved by the fans.

=== Vasco da Gama ===
In December 2013, he signed a four-year contract with Brazilian club Vasco da Gama. Silva made his competitive debut for the club on 26 January 2014 in a 6-0 victory over Friburguense during the Campeonato Carioca, playing all ninety minutes and keeping a clean sheet. Silva made his Série B debut for the club three months later, appearing on matchday one and picking up a yellow card in a 1–1 draw with América Mineiro. Silva would go on to make over 200 appearances in all competitions for the club during his four-year spell.

=== Libertad ===
In December 2018, Silva moved back to Paraguay, signing a three-year contract with Libertad. He made his league debut for the club on 22 January 2019, playing all ninety minutes in a 2-0 defeat to Sol de América.

== International career ==
Silva has played for the Uruguay under-17 team and the Uruguay under-20 team from 1999 to 2003. He won his first international cap for Uruguay in a friendly match against Algeria, on 12 August 2009. He was included in the starting line-up of players for that match. Silva was also Uruguay's third choice goalkeeper in the 2010 FIFA World Cup and the 2011 Copa América. He played for the national team against Tahiti on 23 June 2013, when Uruguay defeated the Tahitians 8–0 in the Confederations Cup, and had his third and fourth games against Jordan, when Uruguay won its place for the 2014 World Cup, on 13 and 20 November 2013, respectively.

In 2018, he was selected in Uruguay's 23 men squad for the 2018 FIFA World Cup in Russia. However, Silva didn't appear in any matches during the tournament. Silva was then included in Uruguay's squad for the 2019 Copa América in Brazil, however he once again failed to appear during the tournament.

== Career statistics ==
=== Club ===
As of match played 5 October 2024.

Appearances and goals by club, season and competition
| Club | Season | League | | | State league | | National cup | | Continental | | Other | | Total | |
| Club | Season | Division | Apps | Goals | Apps | Goals | Apps | Goals | Apps | Goals | Apps | Goals | Apps | Goals |
|---|---|---|---|---|---|---|---|---|---|---|---|---|---|---|
| Olimpia | 2011 | Primera División | 19 | 0 | — | | — | | 6 | 0 | — | | 7 | 0 |
| Olimpia | 2012 | Primera División | 41 | 1 | — | | — | | 10 | 0 | — | | 51 | 1 |
| Olimpia | 2013 | Primera División | 23 | 0 | — | | — | | 16 | 0 | — | | 39 | 0 |
| Olimpia | Total | | 83 | 1 | — | | — | | 32 | 0 | — | | 115 | 1 |
| Vasco da Gama | 2014 | Série B | 25 | 0 | 15 | 0 | 5 | 0 | — | | — | | 45 | 0 |
| Vasco da Gama | 2015 | Série A | 21 | 0 | 17 | 0 | 7 | 0 | — | | — | | 45 | 0 |
| Vasco da Gama | 2016 | Série B | 26 | 0 | 17 | 0 | 7 | 0 | — | | — | | 50 | 0 |
| Vasco da Gama | 2017 | Série A | 35 | 0 | 12 | 0 | 4 | 0 | — | | — | | 51 | 0 |
| Vasco da Gama | 2018 | Série A | 24 | 0 | 11 | 0 | 2 | 0 | 12 | 0 | — | | 49 | 0 |
| Vasco da Gama | Total | | 131 | 0 | 72 | 0 | 25 | 0 | 12 | 0 | — | | 240 | 0 |
| Libertad | 2019 | Primera División | 36 | 0 | — | | 1 | 0 | 12 | 0 | — | | 49 | 0 |
| Libertad | 2020 | Primera División | 30 | 0 | — | | — | | 10 | 0 | — | | 40 | 0 |
| Libertad | 2021 | Primera División | 29 | 0 | — | | 2 | 0 | 16 | 0 | — | | 47 | 0 |
| Libertad | 2022 | Primera División | 41 | 0 | — | | 1 | 0 | 8 | 0 | — | | 50 | 0 |
| Libertad | 2023 | Primera División | 40 | 0 | — | | 5 | 0 | 10 | 0 | — | | 55 | 0 |
| Libertad | 2024 | Primera División | 20 | 0 | — | | 0 | 0 | 4 | 0 | — | | 24 | 0 |
| Libertad | Total | | 196 | 0 | — | | 8 | 0 | 60 | 0 | — | | 264 | 0 |
| Career total | | | 410 | 1 | 73 | 0 | 33 | 0 | 104 | 0 | 0 | 0 | 620 | 1 |

=== International ===
As of match played 15 June 2018

Appearances and goals by national team and year
| National team | Year | Apps | Goals |
|---|---|---|---|
Uruguay
| Uruguay | 2008 | 0 | 0 |
| Uruguay | 2009 | 1 | 0 |
| Uruguay | 2010 | 0 | 0 |
| Uruguay | 2011 | 0 | 0 |
| Uruguay | 2012 | 0 | 0 |
| Uruguay | 2013 | 3 | 0 |
| Uruguay | 2014 | 2 | 0 |
| Uruguay | 2015 | 1 | 0 |
| Uruguay | 2016 | 1 | 0 |
| Uruguay | 2017 | 3 | 0 |
| Uruguay | 2018 | 0 | 0 |
| Uruguay | 2019 | 0 | 0 |
| Uruguay | 2020 | 0 | 0 |
| Total | | 11 | 0 |

== Honours ==
=== Club ===
Defensor Sporting

- Uruguayan Primera División: 2007–08

Runner-up
2005, 2008–09, 2010–11

Olimpia

- Paraguayan Primera División - Clausura: 2011
- Paraguayan Primera División - Aggregate: 2011
- Copa Libertadores runner-up: 2013

Vasco da Gama

- Campeonato Carioca: 2015, 2016

=== International ===
Uruguay

- Copa América: 2011

=== Individual ===
- South American Goalkeeper of the Year: 2013
- Campeonato Carioca Team of the year: 2016, 2017
