= 2012 Cape Town International Challenge =

Tournament details
- Host country: South Africa
- City: Cape Town
- Dates: 25 May - 3 June
- Teams: 8
- Venue: 2 (in 1 host city)

The Cape Town International Challenge is an invitational association football tournament to be hosted in Cape Town, South Africa. The tournament has no official name and has also been referred to as Cape Town International Under-20 Challenge, Eight Nations Cup and the 8 Nation under 20 International Football Challenge. The draw was made on 16 May 2012. The tournament is open to players under 20 years of age. It is considered to be a successor to the 2010 Cape Town International Challenge.

The competition was organised by the Cape Town division of the South African Football Association.

- Japan will be represented by their u-19 team.

== Squads ==
=== South Africa ===
Head coach: (South Africa) Solly Luvhengo

No.	Pos.	Player	Date of birth (age)	Caps	Club
1		Brad Lee Wexler			(Portugal) Club Sporting Maritimo
2		Asive Langwe			(South Africa) Bidvest Wits
3		Daylon Appolis			(South Africa) Bidvest Wits
4		Jerry Mxabo			(South Africa) SuperSport United
5		Nkosingiphile Gumede			(South Africa) Golden Arrows
6		Lebo Ngubeni			(South Africa) University of Pretoria
7		Junior Sibande			(South Africa) University of Pretoria
8		Seun Ledwaba			(South Africa) Mamelodi Sundowns
9		Kwanda Mngonyama			(South Africa) Mamelodi Sundowns
10		Mbongeni Gumede			(South Africa) Sivutsa Stars
11		Kgosietsile Ntlhe			(England) Peterborough United
12		Ebrahim Seedat			(Belgium) Sporting Lokeren
13		Ayanda Ndlovu			(South Africa) Maritzburg United
14		Andile Nqabeni			(South Africa) Thanda Royal Zulu
15		Nkululeko Tshangane			(South Africa) Kaizer Chiefs
16		Maselaelo Seanego			(South Africa) Kaizer Chiefs
17		Phakama Mngadi			(Qatar) Aspire Academy
18		Menzi Masuku			(South Africa) Mpumalanga Aces
19		Gershin Kock			(South Africa) Vasco da Gama
20		Snethemba Ngidi			(South Africa) SuperSport United
21		Gino Moeketsi			(South Africa) SuperSport United
22		Thabani Mthembu			(South Africa) Young Mates FC (KZN)
23		Siyabonga Thwala			(South Africa) AmaZulu
24		Miguel Nogueira			(South Africa) Jomo Cosmos
25		Cebo Meyiwa			(South Africa) SuperSport United

=== Argentina ===
Head coach: (Argentina) Marcelo Trobbiani

No.	Pos.	Player	Date of birth (age)	Caps	Club
		Patricio Auzmendia			
		Franco Fragapane			
		Carlos Luque			
		Andrés Mehring			
		Alan Ruiz			
		Lisandro Magallán			
		Walter Benítez			
		Brian Gomez			
		Gaston Gilromero			
		Carlos Ruiz			
		Lucas Pugh			
		Federico Andrada			
		Matías Kranevitter			
		Francisco Pizzini			
		Martín Benítez			
		Juan Vivas			
		Agustin Allione			
		Brian Ferreira			
		Lucas Rodríguez			
		Jonathan Valle			
		Alan Aguirre			

=== Ghana ===
Head coach: (Ghana) Orlando Wellington

No.	Pos.	Player	Date of birth (age)	Caps	Club
		Seidu Salifu			
		Ibrahim Moro			
		Mumuni Abubakar			
		Daniel Sowatey			
		Abdul Fatawu Safiu			
		Bernard Arthur			
		Tamimu Muntari			
		Emmanuel Obour			
		Frank Sarfo Gyamfi			
		Mohammed Muntari Tagoe			
		Frimpong Manso Edwin			
		Richmond Nketiah			
		Felix Annan			
		Lawrence Lartey			
		Benjamin Fadi			
		Prince Baffoe			
		Daniel Amartey			
		Abdul Rahman Baba			
		Isaac Sackey			
		Jocob Apau Asiedu			
		Abdul Basit Adams			
		Charles Nelson Botchway			

=== Nigeria ===
Head coach: (Nigeria) Sam Obuh

No.	Pos.	Player	Date of birth (age)	Caps	Club
		Chukwunenye Samuel Okani			
		Lekan Yusuf Oyediran			
		Simon Innocent			
		Patrick Kingsley Onyebuchi			
		Saliu Abdullahi Gero			
		Moses Orkuma			
		Nzube Pius Anaezemba			
		Abdullahi Shehu			
		Ikechukwu Okorie			
		Abonima Boniface Izuegbu			
		Lucky Omerou			
		Aminu Umar			
		Obomate Anabraba Fredrick			
		Taiye Ola			
		Josiah Obinna Christian			
		Uche Henry Agbo			
		Abdullahi Mohammed Saidu			
		Habu Idris			
		Chizoba Johnbusco Amaefule			
		Sikiru Adewale Alimi			
		Nnadozie Ugonna Ezenwaka			
		Jacob Abobo Williams			
		Brown Braye			
		Tolulope Samuel Aluko			
		Lookman A. Kadiri Binuyo			

== Group B ==
=== Brazil ===
No.	Pos.	Player	Date of birth (age)	Caps	Club
	GK	Matheus Caldeira			(Brazil) Corinthians
	GK	Igor Rayan			(Brazil) Cruzeiro
	DF	Fabinho			(Brazil) Fluminense
	DF	Romário			(Brazil) Vitória
	DF	Henrique Miranda			(Brazil) São Paulo
	DF	Luiz Gustavo			(Brazil) Palmeiras
	DF	Luan			(Brazil) Vasco
	DF	Wellington Carvalho			(Brazil) Fluminense
	MF	Gomes			(Brazil) Corinthians
	MF	Filipe			(Brazil) Bahia
	MF	Misael			(Brazil) Grêmio
	MF	Diego Souza			(Brazil) Palmeiras
	MF	Bruno Dybal			(Brazil) Palmeiras
	MF	Jean Deretti			(Brazil) Figueirense
	MF	Thomas			(Brazil) Flamengo
	FW	Victor Andrade			(Brazil) Santos
	FW	Bruno Mendes			(Brazil) Guarani
	FW	Ademilson			(Brazil) São Paulo

=== Cameroon ===
Head coach: (Cameroon)

No.	Pos.	Player	Date of birth (age)	Caps	Club
		Kerrido Haschou			
		Alassa Mouchili Nfomban			
		Belibi Anyouzoa			
		Jacques Ghislain Onana Ndzomo			
		Rostand Moukap			
		Thomas Junior Libiih			
		Roberto Ndi Manchi			
		Serge Ane			
		Bouba Hananou			
		Joseph Bruno Eock			
		Pierre Francis Balliang			
		Emmanuel Mbongo Ewangue			
		Yazid Atouba Emane			
		Charles Eloundou			
		Louis Willy Ndongo			
		Tchidjui Frantz Pangop			
		Jean Landry Bassilekin			
		Nicolas Joel, Owono Mbassegue			
		Carlain Manga Mbah			
		Junior Mbai			
		Moussa Souleymanou			

=== Kenya ===
Head coach: (Kenya) Stanley Okumbi

No.	Pos.	Player	Date of birth (age)	Caps	Club
	GK	Joel Bataro			(Kenya) Thika United
	GK	Gradus Ooko			(Kenya) Muhoroni
	DF	Geoffrey Lemu			(Kenya) Kariobangi Sharks
	DF	Islam Omar Islam			(Kenya) Admiral
	DF	Ali Juma Shambi			(Kenya) Coast United
	DF	Vincent Otieno			(Kenya) Thika United
	DF	Athman Mzee Matano			(Kenya) Chemelil Sugar
	DF	Collins Shivachi			(Kenya) Sofapaka
	DF	Charles Bruno			(Kenya) Malindi Academy
	MF	Alphonse Ndonye			(Kenya) Western U20
	MF	Justin Omwonga			(Kenya) Ulinzi Stars
	MF	Tairus Lango			(Kenya)
	MF	Andrew Murunga			(Kenya) Tusker FC
	MF	Patillah Omutiti			(Kenya) Kariobangi Sharks
	MF	Vincent Odongo			(Kenya) Kariobangi Sharks
	MF	David King'atua			(Kenya) Nairobi City Stars
	MF	Danson Mumo Kago			(Kenya) Rangers
	FW	Meshack Karani			(Kenya) Kariobangi Sharks
	FW	Joseph Okumu			(Kenya) AFC Leopards

=== Japan ===
Head coach: (Japan) Yasushi Yoshida

No.	Pos.	Player	Date of birth (age)	Caps	Club
	GK	Masatoshi Kushibiki			(Japan) Shimizu S-Pulse
	GK	Kosuke Nakamura			(Japan) Kashiwa Reysol U-18
	DF	Ken Matsubara			(Japan) Oita Trinita
	DF	Ryosuke Yamanaka			(Japan) Kashiwa Reysol
	DF	Tomoya Inukai			(Japan) Shimizu S-Pulse
	DF	Naoki Kawaguchi			(Japan) Albirex Niigata youth
	DF	Takuya Iwanami			(Japan) Vissel Kobe U-18
	MF	Ryota Tanabe			(Japan) Nagoya Grampus
	MF	Takuma Arano			(Japan) Consadole Sapporo
	MF	Andrew Kumagai			(Japan) Yokohama F. Marinos
	MF	Ryuji Hirota			(Japan) FC Gifu
	MF	Ryota Sakaki			(Japan) Consadole Sapporo
	MF	Kento Hashimoto			(Japan) FC Tokyo
	MF	Gakuto Notsuda			(Japan) Sanfrecce Hiroshima youth
	MF	Hiroki Akino			(Japan) Kashiwa Reysol U-18
	MF	Masaya Matsumoto			(Japan) JFA Academy Fukushima
	FW	Shuto Minami			(Japan) Tokyo Verdy
	FW	Yuya Kubo			(Japan) Kyoto Sanga

== Group stage ==
=== Group A ===
Team	Pld	W	D	L	GF	GA	GD	Pts
Argentina	3	2	1	0	4	1	3	7
South Africa	3	2	0	1	4	3	1	6
Ghana	3	1	1	1	3	4	-1	4
Nigeria	3	0	0	3	2	5	-3	0

25 May 2012
18:00

South Africa	1-3	Argentina

Athlone Stadium
25 May 2012
20:30

Ghana	3-2	Nigeria

Athlone Stadium
27 May 2012
14:00

South Africa	2-0	Ghana

Cape Town Stadium
27 May 2012
16:30

Argentina	1-0	Nigeria

Cape Town Stadium
29 May 2012
18:00

South Africa	1-0	Nigeria

Athlone Stadium
29 May 2012
20:30

Argentina	0-0	Ghana

Athlone Stadium

=== Group B ===
Team	Pld	W	D	L	GF	GA	GD	Pts
Brazil	3	3	0	0	9	1	8	9
Japan	3	2	0	1	6	7	-1	6
Cameroon	3	1	0	2	3	3	0	3
Kenya	3	3	0	0	2	9	-7	0

26 May 2012
14:00

Kenya	2-3	Japan

Cape Town Stadium
26 May 2012
16:30

Brazil	1-0	Cameroon

Cape Town Stadium
28 May 2012
18:00

Brazil	4-0	Kenya

Cape Town Stadium
28 May 2012
20:30

Cameroon	1-2	Japan

Cape Town Stadium
30 May 2012
18:00

Brazil	4-1	Japan

Athlone Stadium
30 May 2012
20:30

Cameroon	2-0	Kenya

Athlone Stadium

== Knockout stage ==
Semi-finals
1 June 2012 - Athlone Stadium
Argentina	1
Japan	0
1 June 2012 - Athlone Stadium
Brazil	2(4)
South Africa	2(3)

Final
3 June 2012 - Cape Town Stadium
Argentina	0
Brazil	2
Third place
3 June 2012 - Cape Town Stadium
Japan	1
South Africa	1

=== Semi finals ===
1 June 2012
18:00

Argentina	1-0	Japan

Athlone Stadium
1 June 2012
20:30

Brazil	2-2	South Africa
Penalties
	4-3

Athlone Stadium

=== Third place playoff ===
3 June 2012
14:00

Japan	1-1	South Africa
Shinya Yajima		Thabani Mthembu
Penalties
	6-7

Cape Town Stadium

=== Final ===
3 June 2012
16:30

Argentina	0-2	Brazil
		Ademilson Braga Bispo Jr; Joao Filipe

Cape Town Stadium

== Awards ==
- Top goal scorer – (South Africa) Thabani Mthembu (5 goals)
- Top goalkeeper - (Argentina) Andres Mehring
- Player of the tournament – (Brazil) Misael Bueno

== Group B ==
=== Brazil ===
No.	Pos.	Player	Date of birth (age)	Caps	Club
	GK	Matheus Caldeira			(Brazil) Corinthians
	GK	Igor Rayan			(Brazil) Cruzeiro
	DF	Fabinho			(Brazil) Fluminense
	DF	Romário			(Brazil) Vitória
	DF	Henrique Miranda			(Brazil) São Paulo
	DF	Luiz Gustavo			(Brazil) Palmeiras
	DF	Luan			(Brazil) Vasco
	DF	Wellington Carvalho			(Brazil) Fluminense
	MF	Gomes			(Brazil) Corinthians
	MF	Filipe			(Brazil) Bahia
	MF	Misael			(Brazil) Grêmio
	MF	Diego Souza			(Brazil) Palmeiras
	MF	Bruno Dybal			(Brazil) Palmeiras
	MF	Jean Deretti			(Brazil) Figueirense
	MF	Thomas			(Brazil) Flamengo
	FW	Victor Andrade			(Brazil) Santos
	FW	Bruno Mendes			(Brazil) Guarani
	FW	Ademilson			(Brazil) São Paulo

=== Cameroon ===
Head coach: (Cameroon)

No.	Pos.	Player	Date of birth (age)	Caps	Club
		Kerrido Haschou			
		Alassa Mouchili Nfomban			
		Belibi Anyouzoa			
		Jacques Ghislain Onana Ndzomo			
		Rostand Moukap			
		Thomas Junior Libiih			
		Roberto Ndi Manchi			
		Serge Ane			
		Bouba Hananou			
		Joseph Bruno Eock			
		Pierre Francis Balliang			
		Emmanuel Mbongo Ewangue			
		Yazid Atouba Emane			
		Charles Eloundou			
		Louis Willy Ndongo			
		Tchidjui Frantz Pangop			
		Jean Landry Bassilekin			
		Nicolas Joel Owono Mbassegue			
		Carlain Manga Mbah			
		Junior Mbai			
		Moussa Souleymanou			

=== Kenya ===
Head coach: (Kenya) Stanley Okumbi

No.	Pos.	Player	Date of birth (age)	Caps	Club
	GK	Joel Bataro			(Kenya) Thika United
	GK	Gradus Ooko			(Kenya) Muhoroni
	DF	Geoffrey Lemu			(Kenya) Kariobangi Sharks
	DF	Islam Omar Islam			(Kenya) Admiral
	DF	Ali Juma Shambi			(Kenya) Coast United
	DF	Vincent Otieno			(Kenya) Thika United
	DF	Athman Mzee Matano			(Kenya) Chemelil Sugar
	DF	Collins Shivachi			(Kenya) Sofapaka
	DF	Charles Bruno			(Kenya) Malindi Academy
	MF	Alphonse Ndonye			(Kenya) Western U20
	MF	Justin Omwonga			(Kenya) Ulinzi Stars
	MF	Tairus Lango			(Kenya)
	MF	Andrew Murunga			(Kenya) Tusker FC
	MF	Patilah Omoto			(Kenya) Kariobangi Sharks
	MF	Vincent Odongo			(Kenya) Kariobangi Sharks
	MF	David King'atua			(Kenya) Nairobi City Stars
	MF	Danson Mumo Kago			(Kenya) Rangers
	FW	Meshack Karani			(Kenya) Kariobangi Sharks
	FW	Joseph Okumu			(Kenya) AFC Leopards

=== Japan ===
Head coach: (Japan) Yasushi Yoshida

No.	Pos.	Player	Date of birth (age)	Caps	Club
	GK	Masatoshi Kushibiki			(Japan) Shimizu S-Pulse
	GK	Kosuke Nakamura			(Japan) Kashiwa Reysol U-18
	DF	Ken Matsubara			(Japan) Oita Trinita
	DF	Ryosuke Yamanaka			(Japan) Kashiwa Reysol
	DF	Tomoya Inukai			(Japan) Shimizu S-Pulse
	DF	Naoki Kawaguchi			(Japan) Albirex Niigata youth
	DF	Takuya Iwanami			(Japan) Vissel Kobe U-18
	MF	Ryota Tanabe			(Japan) Nagoya Grampus
	MF	Takuma Arano			(Japan) Consadole Sapporo
	MF	Andrew Kumagai			(Japan) Yokohama F. Marinos
	MF	Ryuji Hirota			(Japan) FC Gifu
	MF	Ryota Sakaki			(Japan) Consadole Sapporo
	MF	Kento Hashimoto			(Japan) FC Tokyo
	MF	Gakuto Notsuda			(Japan) Sanfrecce Hiroshima youth
	MF	Hiroki Akino			(Japan) Kashiwa Reysol U-18
	MF	Masaya Matsumoto			(Japan) JFA Academy Fukushima
	FW	Shuto Minami			(Japan) Tokyo Verdy
	FW	Yuya Kubo			(Japan) Kyoto Sanga
