= 2014 CR Vasco da Gama season =

Vasco da Gama
2014 season
- President: Roberto Dinamite
- Football Manager: Rodrigo Caetano
- Head Coach: Adílson (until August 30); Joel Santana (since September 7)
- Stadium: Estádio Vasco da Gama (São Januário); Estádio Mário Filho (Maracanã)
- Brasileirão Série B: 3rd place (promoted)
- Copa do Brasil: Round of 16
- Rio de Janeiro State Championship: Runners-up
- Highest home attendance: TBA
- Lowest home attendance: TBA
Home colours	Away colours	Third colours

The 2014 season was Club de Regatas Vasco da Gama's 116th year in existence, the club's 99th season in existence of football, and the club's 2nd season playing in the Brasileirão Série B, the second tier of Brazilian football.

After finishing the 2013 season in 5th place in Brasileirão Série A, Vasco da Gama suffered its second relegation in five years on an administration of, until then, the greatest idol of the club, Roberto Dinamite. Vasco da Gama aimed to return to the top division and win its 2nd title of the Brazilian Série B. The club was also competing the 2014 Copa do Brasil, a competition which it won in 2011.

== Players ==
=== Current squad ===
Note: Flags indicate national team as defined under FIFA eligibility rules; some limited exceptions apply. Players may hold more than one non-FIFA nationality. Squad correct as of 21 April 2014.

No.	Pos.	Nation	Player
1	GK	URU	Martín Silva
2	DF	BRA	André Rocha
3	DF	BRA	Rodrigo
4	DF	BRA	Rafael Vaz
5	MF	ARG	Pablo Guiñazú (captain)
7	FW	BRA	Edmílson
8	MF	BRA	Pedro Ken (on loan from Cruzeiro)
10	MF	BRA	Douglas (on loan from Corinthians)
11	MF	COL	Santiago Montoya
12	MF	BRA	Fabrício (on loan from São Paulo)
14	MF	PAR	Eduardo Aranda
16	DF	BRA	Marlon
17	FW	BRA	Everton Costa (on loan from Coritiba)
18	MF	URU	Maximiliano Rodríguez (on loan from Grêmio)
20	MF	BRA	Dakson
21	DF	BRA	Luan
22	FW	BRA	Rafael Silva
23	FW	BRA	Marquinhos (youth player)
25	GK	BRA	Diogo Silva
26	DF	BRA	Diego Renan (on loan from Cruzeiro)
28	DF	BRA	Jomar
29	MF	BRA	Jhon Cley (youth player)
30	FW	BRA	Kléber (on loan from Grêmio)
34	DF	BRA	Anderson Salles
35	DF	BRA	Douglas Silva (on loan from Red Bull Salzburg)
36	DF	BRA	Lorran (youth player)
37	DF	BRA	Henrique (youth player)
38	MF	BRA	Guilherme Biteco (on loan from Hoffenheim)
39	FW	BRA	Thalles (youth player)
40	GK	BRA	Jordi
42	DF	BRA	Carlos César (on loan from Atlético Mineiro)
44	GK	BRA	Rafael Copetti
49	MF	BRA	Lucas Crispim (on loan from Santos)

==== Youth players who are able to play in first team ====
Note: Flags indicate national team as defined under FIFA eligibility rules; some limited exceptions apply. Players may hold more than one non-FIFA nationality. Squad correct as of 10 February 2014.

No.	Pos.	Nation	Player
27	FW	BRA	Yago (youth player)
32	MF	BRA	Guilherme (youth player)
41	DF	BRA	Alisson (youth player)
—	DF	BRA	Kadu (youth player)
—	DF	BRA	Eron (on loan from Villa Rio, youth player)
—	FW	BRA	Caio (youth player)
—	FW	BRA	Daniel (youth player)
—	MF	BRA	Matheus Batista (youth player)
—	MF	BRA	Pereira (youth player)
—	MF	BRA	Renan Casemiro (youth player)
—	FW	BRA	Renato Kayser (youth player)
—	DF	BRA	Richard (youth player)

==== Reserve players (Vasco da Gama B) ====
Note: Flags indicate national team as defined under FIFA eligibility rules; some limited exceptions apply. Players may hold more than one non-FIFA nationality. Squad correct as of 10 February 2014.

No.	Pos.	Nation	Player
—	GK	BRA	Michel Alves
—	DF	BRA	Nei
—	MF	BRA	Sandro Silva (footballer)

==== Out on loan ====
Note: Flags indicate national team as defined under FIFA eligibility rules; some limited exceptions apply. Players may hold more than one non-FIFA nationality. Squad correct as of 10 February 2014.

No.	Pos.	Nation	Player
—	GK	BRA	Alessandro (on loan to Náutico)
—	MF	BRA	Bernardo (on loan to Palmeiras)
—	FW	BRA	Éder Luís (on loan to Al-Nasr)
—	DF	BRA	Eduardo (on loan to Ipatinga)
—	MF	BRA	Fellipe Bastos (on loan from Grêmio)
—	MF	BRA	Malco (on loan to Macaé)
—	DF	BRA	Max (on loan to America)
—	FW	BRA	Rodrigo Dinamite (on loan to Duque de Caxias)
—	FW	BRA	Romário (on loan to Macaé)
—	FW	BRA	Willen (on loan to Avaí)
—	FW	BRA	William Barbio (on loan to Bahia)

=== Squad information ===
As of 10 February 2014.

No.	Name	Nationality	Position (s)	Date of birth (age)	Signed from
Goalkeepers
1	Martín Silva	(Uruguay)	GK	25 March 1983 (age 43)	(Paraguay) Olimpia
25	Diogo Silva	(Brazil)	GK	7 August 1986 (age 39)	(Brazil) Vasco da Gama (loan from Nova Iguaçu)
40	Jordi	(Brazil)	GK	3 September 1993 (age 32)	Youth system
44	Rafael Copetti	(Brazil)	GK	4 April 1991 (age 35)	(Portugal) Benfica B (on loan from Benfica)
Defenders
2	André Rocha	(Brazil)	RB / RSM	19 August 1984 (age 41)	(Brazil) Figueirense
3	Rodrigo	(Brazil)	CB	27 August 1980 (age 45)	(Brazil) Goiás
4	Rafael Vaz	(Brazil)	CB	17 September 1988 (age 37)	(Brazil) Ceará
16	Marlon	(Brazil)	LB	14 September 1985 (age 40)	(Brazil) Criciúma
21	Luan	(Brazil)	CB / RB	10 May 1993 (age 32)	Youth system
26	Diego Renan (on loan from Cruzeiro)	(Brazil)	LB / RB	20 March 1987 (age 39)	(Brazil) Criciúma (loan from Cruzeiro)
28	Jomar	(Brazil)	CB	28 September 1992 (age 33)	(Brazil) Rio Branco (SP) (loan from Vasco da Gama)
34	Anderson Salles	(Brazil)	CB / DMF	16 February 1988 (age 38)	(Brazil) Ituano
35	Douglas Silva (on loan from Red Bull Salzburg)	(Brazil)	CB	7 March 1984 (age 42)	(Brazil) Figueirense (loan from Red Bull Salzburg)
36	Lorran (youth player)	(Brazil)	LB	8 January 1996 (age 30)	Youth system
37	Henrique (youth player)	(Brazil)	LB / LWM	25 April 1994 (age 31)	Youth system
42	Carlos César (on loan from Atlético Mineiro)	(Brazil)	RB	21 April 1987 (age 39)	(Brazil) Atlético Paranaense (loan from Atlético Mineiro)
Midfielders
5	Pablo Guiñazú	(Argentina)	DMF / LSM	26 August 1978 (age 47)	(Paraguay) Libertad
8	Pedro Ken (on loan from Cruzeiro)	(Brazil)	CMF / LWM / RWM	20 March 1987 (age 39)	(Brazil) Vitória (loan from Cruzeiro)
10	Douglas (on loan from Corinthians)	(Brazil)	AMF	18 February 1982 (age 44)	(Brazil) Corinthians
11	Santiago Montoya	(Colombia)	AMF / LW / SS / RW	15 September 1991 (age 34)	(Argentina) All Boys
12	Fabrício (on loan from São Paulo)	(Brazil)	DMF / CMF	5 July 1982 (age 43)	(Brazil) São Paulo
14	Eduardo Aranda	(Paraguay)	DMF / RWM / CMF	28 January 1985 (age 41)	(Paraguay) Olimpia
18	Maximiliano Rodríguez (on loan from Grêmio)	(Uruguay)	AMF / LW	2 October 1990 (age 35)	(Brazil) Grêmio
20	Dakson	(Brazil)	AMF / CMF / LWM / RWM	11 July 1987 (age 38)	(Bulgaria) Lokomotiv Plovdiv
29	Jhon Cley (youth player)	(Brazil)	AMF / CMF / LWM / RWM	9 March 1994 (age 32)	Youth system
38	Guilherme Biteco (on loan from Hoffenheim)	(Brazil)	AMF / LWM	12 March 1994 (age 32)	(Brazil) Grêmio (loan from Hoffenheim)
49	Lucas Crispim (on loan from Santos)	(Brazil)	AMF / LW / RW	19 June 1994 (age 31)	(Brazil) Santos (U-20) (youth system)
Forwards
7	Edmílson	(Brazil)	ST / SS / CF / RW / LW	15 September 1982 (age 43)	(Japan) FC Tokyo (loan from Al-Gharafa)
17	Everton Costa (on loan from Coritiba)	(Brazil)	CF / RW / LW / SS	6 January 1986 (age 40)	(Brazil) Santos (loan from Coritiba)
22	Rafael Silva	(Brazil)	CF / RW / LW / SS / ST	8 October 1990 (age 35)	(Brazil) Ituano
23	Marquinhos (youth player)	(Brazil)	LW / RW / SS	22 February 1994 (age 32)	Youth system
30	Kléber (on loan from Grêmio)	(Brazil)	CF / ST / SS	15 September 1982 (age 43)	(Brazil) Grêmio
39	Thalles (youth player)	(Brazil)	ST / CF	18 May 1995 (age 30)	Youth system

==== Youth players who are able to play in first team ====
As of 10 February 2014.

No.	Name	Nationality	Position (s)	Date of birth (age)	Youth Level	Signed from
Defenders
41	Alisson	(Brazil)	CB	10 February 1994 (aged 20)	(Brazil) Vasco da Gama U-20	(Brazil) Internacional U-20
42	Eron (on loan from Villa Rio)	(Brazil)	RB	10 March 1995 (aged 19)	(Brazil) Vasco da Gama U-20	(Brazil) Ceará U-17
	Éverton França	(Brazil)	RB	7 April 1995 (aged 19)	(Brazil) Vasco da Gama U-20	(Italy) Fiorentina U-20
	Kadu	(Brazil)	CB / RWM	2 March 1995 (aged 19)	(Brazil) Vasco da Gama U-20	(Brazil) Fluminense U-17
	Richard	(Brazil)	RB / RWB	3 April 1995 (aged 19)	(Brazil) Vasco da Gama U-20	
Midfielders
12	Matheus Batista	(Brazil)	DMF / CB	4 October 1994 (aged 20)	(Brazil) Vasco da Gama U-20	
32	Guilherme	(Brazil)	AMF / LWM	31 March 1994 (aged 20)	(Brazil) Vasco da Gama U-20	
	Renan Casemiro	(Brazil)	CMF	9 April 1995 (aged 19)	(Brazil) Vasco da Gama U-20	
Forwards
22	Daniel	(Brazil)	ST	14 April 1995 (aged 19)	(Brazil) Vasco da Gama U-20	
27	Yago	(Brazil)	RW / LW / SS	28 April 1994 (aged 20)	(Brazil) Vasco da Gama U-20	
	Caio	(Brazil)	ST	10 February 1997 (aged 17)	(Brazil) Vasco da Gama U-17	
	Muriel	(Brazil)	RW / LW / CF	10 January 1996 (aged 18)	(Brazil) Vasco da Gama U-20	(Italy) Milan U-17
	Renato Kayser	(Brazil)	CF / LW / RW	17 February 1996 (aged 18)	(Brazil) Vasco da Gama U-20	(Brazil) Vasco da Gama U-17 (loan from Desportivo Brasil)

==== Reserve players (Vasco da Gama B) ====
No.	Name	Nationality	Position (s)	Date of birth (age)	Signed from
Goalkeepers
	Michel Alves	(Brazil)	GK	25 March 1981 (aged 33)	(Brazil) Vasco da Gama
Defenders
	Nei	(Brazil)	RB / LB	6 December 1985 (aged 29)	(Brazil) Vasco da Gama
Midfielders
	Sandro Silva	(Brazil)	DMF / RSM	29 April 1984 (aged 30)	(Brazil) Boa (loan)

==== Out on loan ====
As of 10 February 2014.

No.	Name	Nationality	Position (s)	Date of birth (age)	Signed from
Goalkeepers
	Alessandro (on loan to Náutico)	(Brazil)	GK	30 March 1988 (aged 26)	(Brazil) Vasco da Gama
Defenders
	Eduardo (on loan to Ipatinga)	(Brazil)	CB	27 August 1993 (aged 21)	(Brazil) Vasco da Gama U-20
	Max (on loan to America)	(Brazil)	RB / LB	28 April 1990 (aged 24)	(Brazil) Paysandu (loan)
Midfielders
	Bernardo (on loan to Palmeiras)	(Brazil)	AMF / CF / SS / LW	20 May 1990 (aged 24)	(Brazil) Vasco da Gama
	Fellipe Bastos (on loan to Grêmio)	(Brazil)	CMF	1 February 1990 (aged 24)	(Brazil) Vasco da Gama
	Malco (on loan to Macaé)	(Brazil)	CMF / DMF	8 January 1993 (aged 21)	(Brazil) Vasco da Gama U-20
Forwards
	Éder Luís (on loan to Al-Nasr)	(Brazil)	RW / ST / SS	29 April 1985 (aged 29)	(Brazil) Vasco da Gama
	Rodrigo Dinamite (on loan to Duque de Caxias)	(Brazil)	CF	25 August 1992 (aged 22)	(Brazil) Oeste (loan)
	Romário (on loan to Macaé)	(Brazil)	ST	15 January 1992 (aged 22)	(Brazil) Boavista (loan)
	Willen (on loan to Avaí)	(Brazil)	CF	10 January 1992 (aged 22)	(Brazil) Bangu (loan)
	William Barbio (on loan from Bahia)	(Brazil)	RW / LW	22 October 1992 (aged 22)	(Brazil) Vasco da Gama

=== Transfers summary ===
==== In ====
Date	Player	Number	Position	Previous club	Fee/notes	Ref
December 23, 2013	(Uruguay) Martín Silva		GK	(Paraguay) Olimpia	Free agent, free transfer, four-years contract	
December 25, 2013	(Paraguay) Eduardo Aranda		MF	(Paraguay) Olimpia	Free agent, free transfer, three-years contract	
January 3, 2014	(Brazil) Rodrigo		DF	(Brazil) Goiás	Free transfer, two-years contract	
January 4, 2014	(Brazil) André Rocha		DF	(Brazil) Figueirense	Free transfer, one-year contract	
January 5, 2014	(Brazil) Marlon		DF	(Brazil) Criciúma	Free transfer, two-years contract	
April 21, 2014	(Brazil) Anderson Salles		DF	(Brazil) Ituano	Free transfer, two-years contract	
April 21, 2014	(Brazil) Rafael Silva		FW	(Brazil) Ituano	Free transfer, two-years contract	
June 20, 2014	(Brazil) Rafael Copetti		GK	(Portugal) Benfica B (on loan from Benfica)	Transfer, one-and-a-half-year contract	

===== Loan In =====
Date from	Date to	Player	Number	Position	Previous club	Fee/notes	Ref
January 1, 2014	December 31, 2014	(Brazil) Pedro Ken		MF	(Brazil) Vitória (on loan from Cruzeiro)	Previously on Vasco da Gama on loan from Cruzeiro (23 December 2012 at 31 December 2013), loaned in exchange for trade of Marlone, one-year loan deal	
January 7, 2014	December 31, 2014	(Brazil) Everton Costa		FW	(Brazil) Santos (on loan from Coritiba)	Loan transfer from Coritiba, one-year loan deal	
January 9, 2014	December 31, 2014	(Brazil) Diego Renan		DF	(Brazil) Criciúma (on loan from Cruzeiro)	Loan transfer from Cruzeiro, one-year loan deal	
February 5, 2014	December 31, 2014	(Brazil) Douglas		MF	(Brazil) Corinthians	Loan transfer from Corinthians, one-year loan deal	
February 19, 2014	December 31, 2014	(Brazil) Douglas Silva		DF	(Brazil) Figueirense (on loan from Red Bull Salzburg)	Loan transfer from Red Bull Salzburg, one-year loan deal	
April 21, 2014	December 31, 2014	(Brazil) Fabrício		MF	(Brazil) São Paulo	Loan transfer from São Paulo, half-year loan deal	
April 21, 2014	December 31, 2014	(Brazil) Guilherme Biteco		MF	(Brazil) Grêmio (on loan from Hoffenheim)	Loan transfer from Hoffenheim, half-year loan deal	
May 7, 2014	December 31, 2014	(Brazil) Lucas Crispim		MF	(Brazil) Santos U-20	Loan transfer from Santos, half-year loan deal	
May 28, 2014	December 31, 2014	(Brazil) Carlos César		DF	(Brazil) Atlético Paranaense (on loan from Atlético Mineiro)	Loan transfer from Atlético Mineiro, half-year loan deal	
June 12, 2014	December 31, 2014	(Brazil) Kléber		FW	(Brazil) Grêmio	Loan transfer from Grêmio, loaned in exchange for loan of Fellipe Bastos, one-year loan deal Previously end of loan: 31 May 2015	
August 15, 2014	December 31, 2014	(Uruguay) Maximiliano Rodríguez		MF	(Brazil) Grêmio	Loan transfer from Grêmio, half-year loan deal	

===== On Trial (In) =====
Date from	Date to	Player	Number	Position	Previous club	Fee/notes	Ref
January 8, 2014		(Brazil) Michel Alves	1	GK	(Brazil) Vasco da Gama	Player out of squad under contract with Vasco da Gama	
January 8, 2014		(Brazil) Nei	4	DF	(Brazil) Vasco da Gama	Player out of squad under contract with Vasco da Gama	
April 15, 2014		(Brazil) Romário		FW	(Brazil) Boavista (on loan from Vasco da Gama)	Player out of squad under contract with Vasco da Gama	

==== Out ====
Date	Player	Number	Position	Destination club	Fee/notes	Ref
December 15, 2013; December 31, 2013	(Brazil) Roni		DF	(Brazil) Marília	Released, end of contract, previously under contract with Vasco da Gama out of squad Free transfer	
December 16, 2013	(Brazil) Marlone	30	MF	(Brazil) Cruzeiro	Traded in exchange for R$ 3,5 million plus one-year more loan of Pedro Ken	
December 27, 2013; December 31, 2013	(Ecuador) Carlos Tenorio	11	FW	(Ecuador) El Nacional	End of contract Free transfer	
December 31, 2013	(Brazil) Cris	13	DF		End of contract	
December 31, 2013	(Brazil) Marquinhos Moraes		MF	(Brazil) Paulista	End of contract, previously under contract with Vasco da Gama out of squad Free transfer	
December 31, 2013; February 4, 2014	(Brazil) Robinho	41	FW	(Brazil) Boa	Released, end of contract Free transfer	
December 31, 2013; February 1, 2014	(Brazil) Jonathan		FW	(Brazil) Tombense	Released, end of contract, previously under contract with Vasco da Gama out of squad Free transfer	
January 14, 2014	(Brazil) Guilherme Morano		FW		Released, end of contract, previously under contract with Vasco da Gama out of squad	
January 29, 2014	(Brazil) Juninho Pernambucano	8	MF		Retirement	
February 13, 2014	(Brazil) Wendel	17	MF	(Brazil) Sport do Recife	Released, judicial rescission, previously under contract with Vasco da Gama out of squad Free transfer	
February 13, 2014	(Brazil) Abuda	22	MF	(Brazil) Chapecoense	Released, mutual rescission Free transfer	
February 28, 2014	(Brazil) Nilson		FW	(Brazil) Boa	Released, end of contract, previously on Bragantino on loan from Vasco da Gama; Free transfer	
March 15, 2014	(Brazil) Baiano	35	MF	(Brazil) Novo Hamburgo	End of contract, previously under contract with Vasco da Gama out of squad	
May 1, 2014	(Brazil) Rodolfo		DF		Released, mutual rescission, previously under contract with Vasco da Gama out of squad	
May 22, 2014	(Brazil) Renato Augusto		MF		Released, end of contract, previously on Ipatinga on loan from Vasco da Gama	
May 30, 2014; August 2, 2014	(Brazil) Enrico		MF	(Greece) Apollon Smyrnis	Released, end of contract, previously under contract with Vasco da Gama out of squad Free transfer	
May 30, 2014; August 8, 2014	(Brazil) Renato Silva		DF	(Brazil) Santa Cruz	Released, judicial rescission, previously under contract with Vasco da Gama out of squad	
September 26, 2013; May 31, 2014	(Brazil) Danilo		MF	(Portugal) Sporting de Braga	U-20/U-17 player R$ 13,5 million	
June 17, 2014	(Brazil) Reginaldo		FW		End of contract	
July 20, 2014	(Brazil) Dieyson		DF	(Brazil) Boa	Released, end of contract, previously on Caxias do Sul on loan from Vasco da Gama	
October 15, 2014	(Brazil) Washington		MF	(Brazil) Madureira	Released, end of contract, previously on Duque de Caxias on loan from Vasco da Gama	

===== Loan Out =====
Date from	Date to	Player	Number	Position	Destination club	Fee/notes	Ref
August 25, 2013	June 30, 2015	(Brazil) Éder Luís		FW	(United Arab Emirates) Al-Nasr	R$ 6 million, two-years loan deal	
January 8, 2014	July 20, 2014	(Brazil) Dieyson	36	DF	(Brazil) Caxias do Sul	Loan transfer, one-year loan deal	
January 8, 2014	August 15, 2014	(Brazil) Max		DF	(Brazil) Caxias do Sul	Loan transfer, one-year loan deal	
January 8, 2014	April 15, 2014	(Brazil) Romário		FW	(Brazil) Boavista	Loan transfer, Rio State League loan deal	
January 10, 2014	December 31, 2014	(Brazil) Alessandro	12	GK	(Brazil) Náutico	Loan transfer, one-year loan deal	
January 15, 2014	December 31, 2014	(Brazil) Rodrigo Dinamite		FW	(Brazil) Duque de Caxias	Loan transfer, one-year loan deal	
January 15, 2014	October 15, 2014	(Brazil) Washington		MF	(Brazil) Duque de Caxias	Loan transfer, one-year loan deal	
January 16, 2014	April 15, 2014	(Brazil) Willen		FW	(Brazil) Bangu	Loan transfer, Rio State League loan deal	
February 11, 2014	May 22, 2014	(Brazil) Renato Augusto		MF	(Brazil) Ipatinga	Previously under contract with Vasco da Gama out of squad Loan transfer, Minas State League loan deal	
February 11, 2014	December 31, 2014	(Brazil) Eduardo		DF	(Brazil) Ipatinga	Loan transfer, one-year loan deal	
April 21, 2014	December 31, 2014	(Brazil) Willen		FW	(Brazil) Avaí	Loan transfer, Brasileirão Série B loan deal	
May 5, 2014	December 31, 2014	(Brazil) Bernardo		MF	(Brazil) Palmeiras	Loan transfer, Brasileirão Série A loan deal	
May 10, 2014	December 31, 2014	(Brazil) William Barbio		FW	(Brazil) Bahia	Loan transfer, Brasileirão Série A loan deal	
June 12, 2014	May 31, 2015	(Brazil) Fellipe Bastos		MF	(Brazil) Grêmio	Loan transfer, loaned in exchange for loan of Kléber, one-year loan deal	
June 21, 2014	December 31, 2014	(Brazil) Malco		MF	(Brazil) Macaé	Loan transfer, Brasileirão Série C loan deal	
June 21, 2014	December 31, 2014	(Brazil) Romário		FW	(Brazil) Macaé	Loan transfer, Brasileirão Série C loan deal	
August 7, 2014	August 20, 2014	(Brazil) Sandro Silva		MF	(Brazil) Boa	Previously under contract with Vasco da Gama out of squad Loan transfer, Brasileirão Série B loan deal	
August 15, 2014	December 31, 2014	(Brazil) Max		DF	(Brazil) America	Loan transfer, half-year loan deal	

== Match results ==
=== Copa São Paulo Júnior (U-20) ===
==== Copa São Paulo squad ====
Note: Flags indicate national team as defined under FIFA eligibility rules; some limited exceptions apply. Players may hold more than one non-FIFA nationality.

No.	Pos.	Nation	Player
1	GK	BRA	Gabriel Félix
2	DF	BRA	Richard
3	DF	BRA	Alisson
4	DF	BRA	Venício
5	MF	BRA	Matheus Batista (captain)
6	DF	BRA	Lorran
7	FW	BRA	Yago
8	MF	BRA	Márcio
9	FW	BRA	Wendell
10	MF	BRA	Guilherme
11	FW	BRA	Marquinhos
12	GK	BRA	Diego
13	DF	BRA	Éverton França

No.	Pos.	Nation	Player
14	DF	BRA	Sinval
15	MF	BRA	Lucas Barboza
16	MF	BRA	Paulista
17	MF	BRA	Bruno Cosendey
18	FW	BRA	Daniel
19	FW	BRA	Caio
20	FW	BRA	Renato Kayser
21	DF	BRA	Lucas Toledo*
22	MF	BRA	Waldir*
23	DF	BRA	Kadu*
24	MF	BRA	Giorgio*
25	GK	BRA	Juninho*

==== Group stage (Group T) ====
===== Table standings =====
Pos	Team	Pld	W	D	L	GF	GA	GD	Pts	Qualification
1	Audax São Paulo	3	3	0	0	7	0	+7	9	Advanced to the Round of 32
2	Vasco da Gama	3	2	0	1	4	2	+2	6	
3	JV Lideral	3	1	0	2	2	5	−3	3	
4	USAC	3	0	0	3	0	6	−6	0	

===== Matches =====
January 3, 2014 Group stage: Match 1	Vasco da Gama	0 – 2	Audax São Paulo	Suzano
19:00 BRST	Wendell (yellow card) 52' (red card) 76'; Yago (yellow card) 61'; Venício (yellow card) 65' (yellow-red card) 71'	Report; Report	57' Patrick; 66' (pen.) Wellington; (yellow card) 25' (yellow-red card) 34' Gabriel; (yellow card) 86' Adriel	Stadium: Estádio Municipal Francisco Marques Figueira (Suzanão); Attendance: N/A; Referee: Sérgio da Rocha Gomes

January 6, 2014 Group stage: Match 2	JV Lideral	0 – 3	Vasco da Gama	Suzano
16:00 BRST	Daniel (yellow card) 7'; Ítalo Bruno (yellow card) 64'	Report; Report	21' Guilherme; 38' Richard; 73' Renato Kayser; (yellow card) 82' (yellow-red card) 85' Sinval	Stadium: Estádio Municipal Francisco Marques Figueira (Suzanão); Attendance: N/A; Referee: Vinicius Gonçalves Araujo

January 9, 2014 Group stage: Match 3	USAC	0 – 1	Vasco da Gama	Suzano
21:00 BRST	Samuel 11'; Victor (yellow card) 14' (yellow-red card) 49'; Raphael (yellow card) 20'; Erik	Report; Report	88' Wendell; (yellow card) 37' Guilherme	Stadium: Estádio Municipal Francisco Marques Figueira (Suzanão); Attendance: N/A; Referee: Douglas Marcucci

=== Rio de Janeiro State Championship ===
==== Guanabara Cup ====
===== Table standings =====
Pos	Team	Pld	W	D	L	GF	GA	GD	Pts	Qualification or relegation
1	Flamengo	15	12	2	1	36	16	+20	38	Advanced to the Semifinals
2	Fluminense	15	9	4	2	31	16	+15	31	Advanced to the Semifinals
3	Vasco da Gama	15	8	5	2	31	11	+20	29	Advanced to the Semifinals
4	Cabofriense	15	7	4	4	21	20	+1	25	Advanced to the Semifinals
5	Boavista	15	7	4	4	20	21	−1	25	

Updated to match(es) played on March 23, 2014. Source: GloboEsporte.com
Rules for classification: 1st points; 2nd wins; 3rd goal difference; 4th goals scored; 5th head-to-head results; 6th least red cards received; 7th least yellow cards received; 8th draw.

===== Matches =====
January 18, 2014 Group stage: Match 1	Vasco da Gama	1 – 1	Boavista	Rio de Janeiro
19:30 BRST	Reginaldo 11'; Guiñazú (yellow card) 86'	Report; Report	62' (yellow card) 72' Cascata; (yellow card) 79' Romarinho	Stadium: Estádio Vasco da Gama (São Januário); Attendance: 5,763 (paying); Referee: Marcelo de Lima Henrique

January 22, 2014 Group stage: Match 2	Macaé	1 – 1	Vasco da Gama	Macaé
19:30 BRST	João Carlos 19'; Ernani (yellow card) 14' (yellow-red card) 49'; Marco Goiano (yellow card) 74'; Daniel (yellow card) 80'; Gedeil (yellow card) 81'; Filipe Machado (yellow card) 83'	Report; Report	40' Edmílson; (yellow card) 69' (yellow-red card) 71' Pedro Ken; (yellow card) 73' Montoya; (yellow card) 81' Bernardo	Stadium: Estádio Cláudio Moacyr de Azevedo (Moacyrzão); Attendance: 2,621; Referee: Wagner Magalhaes

January 26, 2014 Group stage: Match 3	Vasco da Gama	6 – 0	Friburguense	Rio de Janeiro
19:30 BRST	Montoya 25'; Edmílson 44', 49'; William Barbio 55' (yellow card) 34'; Marlon 63'; Rafael Vaz 76'; Aranda (yellow card) 42'	Report; Report	(yellow card) 24' Bruno Leal; (yellow card) 42' Flavinho	Stadium: Estádio Vasco da Gama (São Januário); Attendance: 4,654; Referee: Pathrice Maia

January 29, 2014 Group stage: Match 4	Audax Rio de Janeiro	0 – 4	Vasco da Gama	Volta Redonda
19:30 BRST	Arthur (yellow card) 44' (yellow-red card) 81'; Washington (yellow card) 77'	Report; Report	27' (o.g.) Leandro Camilo; 28' Edmílson; 45+1', 75' Bernardo; (yellow card) 42' Aranda; (yellow card) 77' Luan; (yellow card) 81' André Rocha	Stadium: Estádio Raulino de Oliveira; Attendance: 3,424; Referee: Leonardo Cavalero

February 2, 2014 Group stage: Match 5	Vasco da Gama	1 – 0	Botafogo	Rio de Janeiro
19:30 BRST	Thalles 74'; Aranda (yellow card) 41'; Guiñazú (yellow card) 58'; Silva (yellow card) 90+2'	Report; Report	(yellow card) 18' Alex	Stadium: Estádio Mário Filho (Maracanã); Attendance: 13,083; Referee: Rodrigo Carvalhaes

February 5, 2014 Group stage: Match 6	Volta Redonda	1 – 2	Vasco da Gama	Volta Redonda
21:45 BRST	Tiago Amaral 10'	Report; Report	21' (yellow card) 48' Thalles; 32' (yellow card) 89' Bernardo; (yellow card) 60' Guiñazú; (yellow card) 84' Silva	Stadium: Estádio Raulino de Oliveira; Attendance: 1,837; Referee: Raphael Silvano

February 9, 2014 Group stage: Match 7	Nova Iguaçu	1 – 1	Vasco da Gama	Volta Redonda
17:00 BRST	Rhayne 90+2'; Sergio Júnior (yellow card) 8'; Jorge Fellipe (yellow card) 60'; Leonidas (yellow card) 72'	Report [ Report]	73' (o.g.) Peter; (yellow card) 25' Luan; (yellow card) 45+1' Montoya; (yellow card) 81' Henrique	Stadium: Estádio Raulino de Oliveira; Attendance: 2,634; Referee: Bruno Arleu de Araújo

February 16, 2014 Group stage: Match 8	Vasco da Gama	1 – 2	Flamengo	Rio de Janeiro
16:00 BRT	Fellipe Bastos 37' (yellow card) 10'; Diego Renan (yellow card) 27'; Guiñazú (yellow card) HT; Aranda (yellow card) 62'	Report; Report	40' Elano; 90' Gabriel; (yellow card) 12' Wallace; (yellow card) 38' Felipe; (yellow card) 41' André Santos	Stadium: Estádio Mário Filho (Maracanã); Attendance: 16,972; Referee: Eduardo Guimarães

February 19, 2014 Group stage: Match 9	Bangu	0 – 2	Vasco da Gama	Rio de Janeiro
16:00 BRT		Report; Report	69' (yellow card) 84' Thalles; 77' Montoya; (yellow card) 53' Fellipe Bastos	Stadium: Estádio Proletário Guilherme da Silveira (Moça Bonita); Attendance: 2,058 (paying); Referee: Grazziani Rocha

February 23, 2014 Group stage: Match 10	Vasco da Gama	1 – 2	Cabofriense	Rio de Janeiro
18:30 BRT	Edmílson 16'; Jomar (yellow card) 45'; Luan (yellow card) 69'	Report; Report	19' (yellow card) 45+2' Pará; 27' Fabrício Carvalho; (yellow card) 32' Éberson	Stadium: Estádio Vasco da Gama (São Januário); Attendance: 7,347; Referee: Wagner Magalhaes

February 27, 2014 Group stage: Match 11	Madureira	1 – 3	Vasco da Gama	Rio de Janeiro
16:00 BRT	Carlinhos 62' (pen.); Luiz Paulo (yellow card) 71'	Report; Report	45' Rafael Vaz; 52' Edmílson; 81' (pen.) Douglas; (yellow card) 32' Fellipe Bastos; (yellow card) 53' Pedro Ken; (yellow card) 65' André Rocha; (yellow card) 76' Silva; (yellow card) 84' Reginaldo	Stadium: Estádio Aniceto Moscoso (Conselheiro Galvão); Attendance: 1,381; Referee: Marcelo de Lima Henrique

March 5, 2014 Group stage: Match 12	Vasco da Gama	2 – 0	Resende	Rio de Janeiro
19:30 BRT	Edmílson 45+1'; André Rocha 65' (yellow card) 61'	Report; Report	(yellow card) 28' Felipe Alves; (yellow card) 45+1' Geovane Maranhão; (yellow card) 57' Deoclécio	Stadium: Estádio Vasco da Gama (São Januário); Attendance: 4,535; Referee: Leonardo Cavaleiro

March 8, 2014 Group stage: Match 13	Vasco da Gama	1 – 1	Bonsucesso	Rio de Janeiro
18:30 BRT	Marlon 85'; Douglas (yellow card) 33'	Report; Report	75' (yellow card) 51' Geovane; (yellow card) 66' Fernando; (yellow card) 89' Da Silva	Stadium: Estádio Vasco da Gama (São Januário); Attendance: 4,602; Referee: Antonio Schneider

March 16, 2014 Group stage: Match 14	Fluminense	1 – 1	Vasco da Gama	Rio de Janeiro
18:30 BRT	Fred 67'; Diguinho (yellow card) 29'	Report [ Report]	42' Edmílson; (yellow card) 48' André Rocha; (yellow card) 63' Guiñazú; (yellow card) 65' Pedro Ken; (yellow card) 83' Rodrigo	Stadium: Estádio Mário Filho (Maracanã); Attendance: 17,248; Referee: Rodrigo Nunes de Sá

March 23, 2014 Group stage: Match 15	Vasco da Gama	4 – 0	Duque de Caxias	Rio de Janeiro
16:00 BRT	Reginaldo 1'; Everton Costa 15'; Edmílson 53', 83'; Marlon (yellow card) 70'	Report; Report	(yellow card) 74' Washington	Stadium: Estádio Vasco da Gama (São Januário); Attendance: 2,991; Referee: Philipp Georg

==== Semifinals ====
===== Matches =====
March 27, 2014 Semifinals: Leg 1	Vasco da Gama	1 − 1	Fluminense	Rio de Janeiro
21:00 BRT	Fred 56'; Gum (yellow card) 39'; Jean (yellow card) 61' (yellow-red card) 90+3'; Rafinha (yellow card) 90+4'	Report [ Report]	67' Thalles; (yellow card) 21' André Rocha; (yellow card) 34' Marlon; (yellow card) 66' Guiñazú; (yellow card) 76' Fellipe Bastos	Stadium: Estádio Mário Filho (Maracanã); Attendance: 12,715; Referee: Wagner Magalhaes

March 30, 2014 Semifinals: Leg 2	Fluminense	0 − 1 (1 – 2 agg.)	Vasco da Gama	Rio de Janeiro
16:00 BRT	Valencia (yellow card) 48'	Report; Report	45' Edmílson; (yellow card) 41' Reginaldo; (yellow card) 77' Douglas; (yellow card) 84' Rodrigo; (yellow card) 90+3' Silva	Stadium: Estádio Mário Filho (Maracanã); Attendance: 19,586; Referee: Marcelo de Lima Henrique

==== Finals ====
===== Matches =====
April 6, 2014 Finals: Leg 1	Vasco da Gama	1 − 1	Flamengo	Rio de Janeiro
16:00 BRT	Rodrigo 12'; Everton Costa (yellow card) 45+1' (yellow-red card) 56'; (yellow card) 53' André Rocha; Douglas (yellow card) 55'; Fellipe Bastos (yellow card) 88'	Report; Report	61' Paulinho; (yellow card) 27' Felipe; (yellow card) 45+1' Léo; (yellow card) 68' Samir; (yellow card) 90+1' Éverton	Stadium: Estádio Mário Filho (Maracanã); Attendance: 26,242; Referee: Rodrigo Nunes de Sá

April 13, 2014 Finals: Leg 2	Flamengo	1 − 1 (2 – 2 agg.)	Vasco da Gama	Rio de Janeiro
16:00 BRT	Márcio Araújo 90+1'; Luiz Antônio (yellow card) 10'; Éverton (yellow card) 17'; André Santos (yellow card) 35'; Chicão (red card); Alecsandro (yellow card) 86'	Report; Report	76' (pen.) Douglas; (yellow card) 10' Diego Renan; (yellow card) 14' Luan; (yellow card) 36' Rodrigo; (yellow card) 54' Guiñazú; (red card) André Rocha	Stadium: Estádio Mário Filho (Maracanã); Attendance: 49,139; Referee: Marcelo de Lima Henrique

=== Copa do Brasil ===
==== First round ====
===== Matches =====
April 3, 2014 First round: Leg 1	Resende	0 − 0	Vasco da Gama	Manaus
19:30 BST –1	Gerson (yellow card) 36'; Thiago Sales (yellow card) 53'; Felipe Alves (yellow card) 78'; Dudu (yellow card) 90+1'	Report; Report	(yellow card) 20' Fellipe Bastos; (yellow card) 37' Bernardo	Stadium: Arena da Amazônia; Attendance: 40,122; Referee: Edmar Campos da Encarnacao

April 16, 2014 First round: Leg 2	Vasco da Gama	1 − 0 (1 – 0 agg.)	Resende	Rio de Janeiro
22:00 BRT	Douglas 71' (pen.); Rafael Vaz (yellow card) 63'; Montoya (yellow card) 90+3'	Report; Report	(yellow card) 35' Dudu; (yellow card) 46' Felipe Alves; (yellow card) 63' Lucas Jacques; (yellow card) 67' Mauro; (yellow card) 77' Geovane Maranhão; (yellow card) 90' Gerson	Stadium: Estádio Vasco da Gama (São Januário); Attendance: 9,030; Referee: Rodrigo Carvalhaes

==== Second round ====
===== Matches =====
April 30, 2014 Second round: Leg 1	Treze	1 − 2	Vasco da Gama	Campina Grande
22:00 BRT	Esquerdinha 20'; Birungueta (yellow card) 69'; Douglas (yellow card) 74'	Report; Report	51', 86' Thalles; (yellow card) 38' Montoya; (yellow card) 63' Diego Renan; (yellow card) 71' Danilo	Stadium: Estádio Governador Ernani Sátyro (Amigão); Attendance: 3,172 (paying); Referee: Jailson Macedo Freitas

May 7, 2014 Second round: Leg 2	Vasco da Gama	1 − 1 (3 – 2 agg.)	Treze	Rio de Janeiro
22:00 BRT	Douglas Silva 21'; Douglas (yellow card) 72'; André Rocha (yellow card) 81'; Montoya (yellow card) 90'	Report; Report	25' Jaílson; (yellow card) 15' (yellow-red card) 67' Fernandes; (yellow card) 18' Jardson Sapé; (yellow card) 73' Negretti	Stadium: Estádio Vasco da Gama (São Januário); Attendance: 8,623; Referee: Diego Almeida Real

==== Third round ====
===== Matches =====
July 23, 2014 Third round: Leg 1	Ponte Preta	0 − 2	Vasco da Gama	Campinas
22:00 BRT	Juninho (yellow card) 64'; Raphael Silva (yellow card) 75'; Adilson Goiano (yellow card) 84'	Report; Report	56' Diego Renan; 62' Thalles	Stadium: Estádio Moisés Lucarelli; Attendance: 3,593 (paying); Referee: Ricardo Marques

July 30, 2014 Third round: Leg 2	Vasco da Gama	2 – 1 (4 – 1 agg.)	Ponte Preta	Rio de Janeiro
22:00 BRT	Douglas 21' (pen.); Rafael Costa 42' (o.g.)	Report; Report	39' Jonathan Cafú; (yellow card) 19' Luan; (yellow card) 71' Daniel Borges; (yellow card) 76' Alexandro; (yellow card) 90+3' Magal	Stadium: Estádio Vasco da Gama (São Januário); Attendance: 7,734; Referee: Francisco Carlos do Nascimento

==== Round of 16 ====
===== Matches =====
August 26, 2014 Round of 16: Leg 1	Vasco da Gama	1 − 1	ABC	Rio de Janeiro
19:30 BRT	Kléber 22' (yellow card) 23'; Montoya (yellow card) 20'; Douglas (yellow card) 44'; Douglas Silva (yellow card) 69'; Rodrigo (yellow card) 79'; Fabrício (yellow card) 90' (yellow-red card) 90'	Report; Report	2' João Paulo; (yellow card) 43' Suéliton; (yellow card) 61' Xuxa; (red card) Lúcio Flávio	Stadium: Estádio Vasco da Gama (São Januário); Attendance: 6,872; Referee: Wagner Revay

September 2, 2014 Round of 16: Leg 2	ABC	2 − 1 (3 – 2 agg.)	Vasco da Gama	Natal, Rio Grande do Norte
19:30 BRT	Mádson 13'; Marlon 50'; Diego Jussani (yellow card) 6'; Rogerinho (yellow card) 55' (yellow-red card) 57'	Report; Report	59' Rodríguez; (yellow card) 50' Aranda; (red card) Douglas; (yellow card) 60' Guiñazú; (yellow card) 60' Diego Renan; (yellow card) 74' Douglas Silva; (yellow card) 90+1' Diogo Silva	Stadium: Arena das Dunas; Attendance: 28,200; Referee: Luiz Flávio de Oliveira

=== Brasileirão Série B ===
==== Standings ====
Pos	Team	Pld	W	D	L	GF	GA	GD	Pts	Promotion or relegation
1	Joinville (P, C)	38	21	7	10	54	33	+21	70	Promotion to 2015 Série A
2	Ponte Preta (P)	38	19	12	7	61	38	+23	69	Promotion to 2015 Série A
3	Vasco da Gama (P)	38	16	15	7	50	36	+14	63	Promotion to 2015 Série A
4	Avaí (P)	38	18	8	12	47	40	+7	62	Promotion to 2015 Série A
5	América-MG	38	20	7	11	59	39	+20	61 (Note: América-MG deducted 6 points for lining up an irregular player)	

Updated to match(es) played on 15 November 2014. Source: CBF
Rules for classification: 1st points; 2nd wins; 3rd goal difference; 4th goals scored; 5th head-to-head results; 6th least red cards received; 7th least yellow cards received; 8th draw.
(C) Champions; (P) Promoted

==== Match results ====
April 19, 2014 Match 1	Vasco da Gama	1 − 1	América (MG)	Rio de Janeiro
16:30 BRT	Reginaldo 48'; André Rocha (yellow card) 41'; Silva (yellow card) 71'; Montoya (yellow card) 78'	Report; Report	61' Obina; (yellow card) 28' Elsinho; (yellow card) 67' Andrei Girotto	Stadium: Estádio Vasco da Gama (São Januário); Attendance: N/A (Closed Gates); Referee: Paulo Henrique de Godoy

April 26, 2014 Match 2	Luverdense	2 − 1	Vasco da Gama	Cuiabá
15:30 BST –1	Reinaldo 22'; Rubinho 56' (pen.); Raul Prata (yellow card) 30'; Carlão (yellow card) 46'	Report; Report	71' Yago	Stadium: Arena Pantanal; Attendance: 15,221; Referee: Jean-Pierre Gonçalves

May 3, 2014 Match 3	Vasco da Gama	3 − 0	Atlético Goianiense	Rio de Janeiro
16:30 BRT	Douglas 4' (yellow card) 66'; Marlon 71', 88'; Silva (yellow card) 56'	Report; Report	(yellow card) 57' Marcus Winícius	Stadium: Estádio Vasco da Gama (São Januário); Attendance: N/A (Closed Gates); Referee: Emerson Almeida Ferreira

May 10, 2014 Match 4	Vasco da Gama	2 − 0	Oeste	Rio de Janeiro
16:30 BRT	Rafael Silva 67'; Thalles 77'; Douglas (yellow card) 35'	Report; Report	(yellow card) 10' Denis; (yellow card) 72' Leandro Mello	Stadium: Estádio Vasco da Gama (São Januário); Attendance: N/A (Closed Gates); Referee: Anderson Daronco

August 12, 2014 Match 5	Náutico	0 − 1	Vasco da Gama	Recife
21:00 BRT	Marinho (yellow card) 40'; Risso (yellow card) 49'; Tadeu (yellow card) 57'; Sassá (yellow card) 70'; Cañete (yellow card) 77' (yellow-red card) 80'; Renato Chaves (yellow card) 86'	Report; Report	7' Dakson; (yellow card) 34' Douglas; (yellow card) 45' Guiñazú; (yellow card) 47' Diogo Silva; (yellow card) 52' Aranda; (yellow card) 84' Kléber	Stadium: Itaipava Arena Pernambuco; Attendance: 9,417; Referee: Dewson Fernando Freitas

May 20, 2014 Match 6	Vasco da Gama	1 − 1	Sampaio Corrêa	Teresina
22:00 BRT	Guilherme Biteco 90+5' (yellow card) 90+5'; Fabrício (yellow card) 15'; Dakson (yellow card) 89'	Report; Report	65' (yellow card) 53' Márcio Diogo; (yellow card) 7' Alex	Stadium: Estádio Governador Alberto Tavares Silva (Albertão); Attendance: 8,920; Referee: Francisco de Assis Filho

May 24, 2014 Match 7	Joinville	0 − 0	Vasco da Gama	Joinville
16:30 BRT	Rafael (yellow card) 75'; Naldo (yellow card) 78'	Report; Report	(yellow card) 10' Douglas Silva; (yellow card) 45' Diego Renan; (yellow card) 79' Rodrigo; (yellow card) 87' Fabrício	Stadium: Arena Joinville; Attendance: 11,502 (paying); Referee: Luiz Flávio de Oliveira

May 27, 2014 Match 8	Bragantino	1 − 1	Vasco da Gama	Bragança Paulista
22:00 BRT	Robertinho 82' (yellow card) 70'; Gustavo (yellow card) 30'; Francesco (yellow card) 77'	Report; Report	72' (yellow card) 89' Montoya; (yellow card) 67' Pedro Ken	Stadium: Estádio Nabi Abi Chedid; Attendance: 1,361 (paying); Referee: Arilson Bispo da Anunciacao

May 31, 2014 Match 9	Vasco da Gama	1 − 1	Portuguesa	Volta Redonda
16:30 BRT	Rodrigo 14'; Marlon (yellow card) 9'; Edmílson (yellow card) 17'; Guilherme Biteco (yellow card) 58'; Diego Renan (yellow card) 81'	Report; Report	30' Gabriel Xavier; (yellow card) 49' Caion; (yellow card) 51' Rudnei; (yellow card) 80' Serginho	Stadium: Estádio Raulino de Oliveira; Attendance: 2,835; Referee: André Luiz de Freitas Castro

June 3, 2014 Match 10	Boa	0 – 2	Vasco da Gama	Varginha
22:00 BRT	Luiz Eduardo (yellow card) 50'; Betinho (yellow card) 52'	Report; Report	78' Edmílson; 85' Dakson; (yellow card) 10' Luan; (yellow card) 24' Aranda; (yellow card) 83' Douglas	Stadium: Estádio Municipal Prefeito Dilzon Luiz de Melo (Melão); Attendance: unknown Referee: Rodrigo Batista Raposo

July 15, 2014 Match 11	Vasco da Gama	4 – 1	Santa Cruz	Cuiabá
21:00 BST –1	Fabrício 35', 74'; Douglas Silva 41'; Kléber 66' (pen.); Pedro Ken (yellow card) 58'; Carlos César (yellow card) 63'	Report; Report	18' Danilo Pires; (yellow card) 56' Carlos Alberto	Stadium: Arena Pantanal; Attendance: 7,190; Referee: Anderson Daronco

July 19, 2014 Match 12	Vasco da Gama	1 – 1	América de Natal	Rio de Janeiro
16:30 BRT	Douglas 22'; Aranda (yellow card) 30'; Guiñazú (yellow card) 65'; Lucas Crispim (yellow card) 78'	Report; Report	54' (o.g.) Diego Renan; (yellow card) 27' Isac; (yellow card) 38' Márcio Passos; (yellow card) 58' Fabinho	Stadium: Estádio Vasco da Gama (São Januário); Attendance: 18,690; Referee: Rodrigo Raposo

July 26, 2014 Match 13	Ponte Preta	0 – 0	Vasco da Gama	Campinas
16:30 BRT	Rafael Costa (yellow card) 69'	Report; Report	(yellow card) 8' Thalles; (yellow card) 20' Luan; (yellow card) 89' Guiñazú	Stadium: Estádio Moisés Lucarelli; Attendance: 3,622; Referee: Jailson Macedo

August 2, 2014 Match 14	Vasco da Gama	1 – 0	Paraná	Rio de Janeiro
16:30 BRT	Douglas Silva 35'; Diego Renan (yellow card) 40'; Guiñazú (yellow card) 61'	Report; Report	(yellow card) 41' Alisson; (red card) Anderson Rosa; (yellow card) 78' Edson Sitta	Stadium: Estádio Vasco da Gama (São Januário); Attendance: 17,449; Referee: Elmo Alves Rezende

August 9, 2014 Match 15	ABC	1 – 2	Vasco da Gama	Natal, Rio Grande do Norte
16:30 BRT	Dênis Marques 87'; Michel Benhami (yellow card) 59'	Report; Report	36' Kléber; 60' (pen.) Douglas; (yellow card) 45+1' Douglas Silva; (yellow card) 49' Marlon; (yellow card) 80' Dakson; (yellow card) 81' Rodrigo; (yellow card) 87' Henrique	Stadium: Arena das Dunas; Attendance: 27,044; Referee: Wilson Sampaio

August 16, 2014 Match 16	Vasco da Gama	2 – 0	Ceará	Rio de Janeiro
16:30 BRT	Kléber 21'; Douglas 56' (yellow card) 83'; Carlos César (yellow card) 6'; Rodrigo (yellow card) 10'; Silva (yellow card) 86'	Report; Report	(yellow card) 42' Samuel Xavier; (yellow card) 84' Michel; (yellow card) 90+1' João Marcos; (yellow card) 90+2' Anderson	Stadium: Estádio Vasco da Gama (São Januário); Attendance: 18,495; Referee: Edivaldo Elias

August 19, 2014 Match 17	Vila Nova	2 – 1	Vasco da Gama	Brasília
22:00 BRT	Jheimy 8'; Júnior Xuxa 41' (yellow card) 65'; Paulinho (yellow card) 17'; Felipe Macena (yellow card) 35'; Gabriel (yellow card) 79'; Gustavo (yellow card) 85'; Cléber Alves (yellow card) 88'; Jeferson (yellow card) 90+2'	Report [ Report]	45+2' Carlos César; (yellow card) 25' Guiñazú; (yellow card) 25' Kléber; (yellow card) 79' Douglas	Stadium: Estádio Nacional Mané Garrincha; Attendance: 19,921; Referee: Marcos Mateus Pereira

August 22, 2014 Match 18	Icasa	1 – 1	Vasco da Gama	Juazeiro do Norte
22:00 BRT	Felipe Klein 90'; Jonatan (yellow card) 16'; Zé Carlos (yellow card) 18'; Henry Kanu (yellow card) 23'; Naylhor (yellow card) 50'	Report; Report	17' Rodrigo; (yellow card) 16' Montoya; (yellow card) 18' Guiñazú; (yellow card) 77' Marlon	Stadium: Estádio Mauro Sampaio (Romeirão); Attendance: 7,359; Referee: Flavio Rodrigues de Souza

August 30, 2014 Match 19	Vasco da Gama	0 – 5	Avaí	Rio de Janeiro
16:00 BRT	Fabrício (yellow card) 48'; Rafael Silva (yellow card) 57'; Aranda (yellow card) 66'; Luan (red card)	Report; Report	38' Anderson Lopes; 42', 70' Diego Felipe; 66' (yellow card) 55' Diego Jardel; 87' Roberto	Stadium: Estádio Vasco da Gama (São Januário); Attendance: 9,346; Referee: Francisco Nascimento

September 6, 2014 Match 20	América (MG)	2 − 3	Vasco da Gama	Belo Horizonte
16:15 BRT	Willians 2'; Obina 42'; Andrei Girotto (yellow card) 19'	Report; Report	14' Douglas Silva; 24' (yellow card) 34' Thalles; 81' Rodrigo; (yellow card) 19' Guiñazú; (yellow card) 27' Pedro Ken; (yellow card) 90+3' Diego Renan	Stadium: Estádio Raimundo Sampaio (Independência); Attendance: unknown Referee: Alinor Silva da Paixão

September 9, 2014 Match 21	Vasco da Gama	2 − 0	Luverdense	Rio de Janeiro
19:30 BRT	Rodrigo 19'; Rodríguez 61'; Kléber (yellow card) 45+2'	Report; Report	(yellow card) 17' Jean Patrick; (yellow card) 56' Léo	Stadium: Estádio Vasco da Gama (São Januário); Attendance: 8,582; Referee: Marcos André Gomes

September 13, 2014 Match 22	Atlético Goianiense	1 − 1	Vasco da Gama	Goiânia
16:00 BRT	Juninho 69'	Report; Report	44' Edmílson; (yellow card) 68' Pedro Ken; (yellow card) 76' Douglas Silva; (yellow card) 90+2' Rodrigo	Stadium: Estádio do Governo do Estado de Goiás (Serra Dourada); Attendance: 8,957; Referee: Jean Pierre Gonçalves

September 16, 2014 Match 23	Oeste	1 − 1	Vasco da Gama	Manaus
22:00 BRT	Fábio Santos 20'; Leandro Mello (yellow card) 12'; Denis (yellow card) 72'; Halisson (yellow card) 80'	Report; Report	81' (pen.) (yellow card) 63' Douglas; (yellow card) 43' Guiñazú; (yellow card) 51' Fabrício; (yellow card) 64' Edmílson	Stadium: Arena da Amazônia; Attendance: 26,621 (paying); Referee: Paulo Schleich

September 20, 2014 Match 24	Vasco da Gama	2 − 1	Náutico	Rio de Janeiro
16:00 BRT	Dakson 77' (yellow card) 76'; Kléber 88'; Fabrício (yellow card) 5'; Silva (yellow card) 66'; Edmílson (yellow card); Thalles (yellow card)	Report; Report	67' (pen.) Sassá; (yellow card) 5' Paulinho; (yellow card) 27' Risso; (yellow card) 62' Rafael Cruz	Stadium: Estádio Vasco da Gama (São Januário); Attendance: 11,998; Referee: Fabricio Neves Correa

September 23, 2014 Match 25	Sampaio Corrêa	2 − 2	Vasco da Gama	São Luís, Maranhão
22:00 BRT	Edimar 33'; Willian Paulista 90+5'; Uilliam Correia (yellow card) 45+1'; Edgar (yellow card) 45+1' (red card) 79'; Marino (yellow card) 45+2'; Luiz Otávio (yellow card) 57'	Report; Report	45+2' Douglas; 78' Douglas Silva; (yellow card) 21' Jhon Cley	Stadium: Estádio Governador João Castelo (Castelão); Attendance: 44,198; Referee: Gilberto Rodrigues Castro Junior

September 26, 2014 Match 26	Vasco da Gama	2 − 0	Joinville	Rio de Janeiro
22:00 BRT	Dakson 23'; Thalles 58'	Report; Report	(yellow card) 55' Bruno Aguiar	Stadium: Estádio Vasco da Gama (São Januário); Attendance: 7,917; Referee: Vinicius Furlan

October 3, 2014 Match 27	Vasco da Gama	2 − 2	Bragantino	Rio de Janeiro
21:00 BRT	Lucas Crispim 90+2'; Douglas Silva 90+4'; Douglas (yellow card) 33'; Rodrigo (yellow card)	Report; Report	22' (yellow card) 64' Geandro; 73' Antônio Flávio; (yellow card) 28' Magno; (yellow card) 45' Esquerdinha; (yellow card) 66' Anderson Uchoa	Stadium: Estádio Vasco da Gama (São Januário); Attendance: 12,993; Referee: Felipe Duarte Varejao

October 7, 2014 Match 28	Portuguesa	0 − 1	Vasco da Gama	São Paulo
22:00 BRT	Mateus Alonso (yellow card) 25'; Renan (yellow card) 69'	Report; Report	38' Douglas; (yellow card) 36' Douglas Silva; (yellow card) 57' Guiñazú	Stadium: Estádio Doutor Osvaldo Teixeira Duarte (Canindé); Attendance: unknown Referee: Arilson da Anunciação

October 10, 2014 Match 29	Vasco da Gama	2 − 0	Boa	Rio de Janeiro
19:30 BRT	Douglas 86'; Edmílson 90'; Kléber (yellow card) 26'; Dakson (yellow card) 74'	Report; Report	(yellow card) 26' Romão; (yellow card) 49' Eric; (yellow card) 62' Ciro Sena; (yellow card) 64' Piauí; (yellow card) 81' Malaquias	Stadium: Estádio Vasco da Gama (São Januário); Attendance: 9,077; Referee: Antonio Neuriclaudio

October 18, 2014 Match 30	Santa Cruz	1 − 0	Vasco da Gama	Recife
16:00 BRT	Cassiano 86'; Sandro Manoel (yellow card) 44'	Report [ Report]	(yellow card) 44' Fabrício; (yellow card) 66' Marlon; (yellow card) 89' Guiñazú	Stadium: Arena Pernambuco; Attendance: 24,283; Referee: Leandro Vuaden

October 21, 2014 Match 31	América (RN)	2 − 0	Vasco da Gama	Natal, Rio Grande do Norte
21:00 BRT	Rodrigo Pimpão 62' (yellow card) 90+4'; Isac 70'; Márcio Passos (yellow card) 29'; Wanderson (yellow card) 36'; Cléber (yellow card) 52'; Neto (yellow card) 58'; Judson (yellow card) 76'	Report [ Report]	(yellow card) 20' Marlon; (yellow card) 40' Douglas; (yellow card) 47' Guiñazú; (yellow card) 52' Dakson; (yellow card) 90+2' Diego Renan	Stadium: Arena das Dunas; Attendance: 11,088; Referee: Marcos André Gomes

October 25, 2014 Match 32	Vasco da Gama	1 − 1	Ponte Preta	Rio de Janeiro
16:30 BRST	Lucas Crispim 48'; Lorran (yellow card) 11'; Kléber (yellow card) 80'	Report [ Report]	52' Rafael Costa; (yellow card) 39' Rodinei	Stadium: Estádio Vasco da Gama (São Januário); Attendance: 12,896; Referee: André Luiz de Freitas Castro

October 31, 2014 Match 33	Paraná	1 − 1	Vasco da Gama	Curitiba
22:00 BRST	Adaílton 55'; Carlinhos (yellow card) 8'; Alef (yellow card) 54'; Cleiton (yellow card) 56' (yellow-red card) 59'; Lúcio Flávio (yellow card) 58'	Report [ Report]	90+4' Rodríguez; (yellow card) 47' Douglas; (yellow card) 54' Rodrigo; (yellow card) 68' Aranda; (yellow card) 78' Montoya	Stadium: Estádio Durival Britto e Silva (Vila Capanema); Attendance: 4,535; Referee: Flávio Rodrigues Guerra

November 8, 2014 Match 34	Vasco da Gama	1 − 0	ABC	Rio de Janeiro
17:30 BRST	Douglas 45+4' (pen.)	Report [ Report]	(yellow card) 30' Suéliton; (yellow card) 35' Madson; (red card) Gilvan	Stadium: Estádio Mário Filho (Maracanã); Attendance: 49,460; Referee: Guilherme Ceretta

November 15, 2014 Match 35	Ceará	2 − 0	Vasco da Gama	Fortaleza
15:30 BRT	Diego Ivo 31'; Ricardinho 37'; Sandro (yellow card) 60'	Report [ Report]	(yellow card) 22' Diego Renan; (yellow card) 42' Aranda	Stadium: Estádio Governador Plácido Aderaldo Castelo (Castelão); Attendance: 30,256 (paying); Referee: Fabricio Neves Correa

November 18, 2014 Match 36	Vasco da Gama	3 − 1	Vila Nova	Rio de Janeiro
22:00 BRST	Carlos César 38'; Douglas 56' (yellow card) 71'; Jhon Cley 90'; Rodrigo (yellow card) 30'	Report [ Report]	20' Dimba; (yellow card) 30' Radamés; (yellow card) 57' Gabriel; (yellow card) 68' Gustavo; (yellow card) 81' Felipe Macena; (yellow card) 89' Lucas Sotero	Stadium: Estádio Vasco da Gama (São Januário); Attendance: 9,581; Referee: Denival de Morais

November 22, 2014 Match 37	Vasco da Gama	1 − 1	Icasa	Rio de Janeiro
16:30 BRST	Kléber 35'	Report [ Report]	55' (yellow card) 56' Nilson; (yellow card) 13' Ivonaldo; (yellow card) 59' Junior de Barros; (yellow card) 82' Lucas Gomes	Stadium: Estádio Mário Filho (Maracanã); Attendance: 56,334; Referee: Wagner Reway

November 29, 2014 Match 38	Avaí	1 − 0	Vasco da Gama	Florianópolis
16:30 BRST	Marquinhos 28' (pen.); Eduardo Costa (yellow card) 7'; Eltinho (yellow card) 54'; Revson (yellow card) 82'	Report [ Report]	(yellow card) 23' Lorran; (yellow card) 45' Anderson Salles; (yellow card) 83' Rafael Silva	Stadium: Estádio Dr. Aderbal Ramos da Silva (Ressacada); Attendance: 9,156; Referee: Francisco Carlos do Nascimento

== Squad statistics ==
=== Appearances and goals ===
Last updated on 29 November 2014.

- Players in italic have left the club during the season.

No.	Pos	Nat	Player	Total		Brasileirão Série B		Copa do Brasil		Rio de Janeiro State Championship	
No.	Pos	Nat	Player	Apps	Goals	Apps	Goals	Apps	Goals	Apps	Goals
1	GK	(Uruguay) URU	Martín Silva	45	0	25	0	5	0	15	0
2	DF	(Brazil) BRA	André Rocha	29	1	8	0	3+1	0	17	1
3	DF	(Brazil) BRA	Rodrigo	44	5	25	4	3	0	16	1
4	DF	(Brazil) BRA	Rafael Vaz	12	2	2+3	0	2	0	3+2	2
5	MF	(Argentina) ARG	Pablo Guiñazú	45	0	26	0	4	0	15	0
7	FW	(Brazil) BRA	Edmílson	44	14	8+16	3	0+2	0	17+1	11
8	MF	(Brazil) BRA	Pedro Ken	33	0	16+1	0	1	0	11+4	0
10	MF	(Brazil) BRA	Douglas	53	14	34	10	7	2	12	2
11	MF	(Colombia) COL	Santiago Montoya	33	3	3+13	1	4+3	0	4+6	2
12	MF	(Brazil) BRA	Fabrício	29	2	25	2	3+1	0	--	--
14	MF	(Paraguay) PAR	Eduardo Aranda	39	0	15+5	0	4+2	0	11+2	0
16	DF	(Brazil) BRA	Marlon	35	4	15+4	2	4+1	0	10+1	2
17	FW	(Brazil) BRA	Everton Costa	10	1	--	--	1	0	7+2	1
18	MF	(Uruguay) URU	Maximiliano Rodríguez	21	3	14+5	2	1+1	1	--	--
20	MF	(Brazil) BRA	Dakson	29	4	11+11	4	3+2	0	1+1	0
21	DF	(Brazil) BRA	Luan	47	0	23+2	0	4	0	18	0
22	FW	(Brazil) BRA	Rafael Silva	15	1	4+11	1	--	--	--	--
25	GK	(Brazil) BRA	Diogo Silva	16	0	9	0	3	0	4	0
26	DF	(Brazil) BRA	Diego Renan	47	1	31	0	5	1	9+2	0
28	DF	(Brazil) BRA	Jomar	2	0	--	--	1	0	1	0
30	FW	(Brazil) BRA	Kléber	28	6	24	5	4	1	--	--
34	DF	(Brazil) BRA	Anderson Salles	3	0	3	0	--	--	--	--
35	DF	(Brazil) BRA	Douglas Silva	33	6	25+2	5	6	1	--	--
38	MF	(Brazil) BRA	Guilherme Biteco	10	1	5+5	1	--	--	--	--
40	GK	(Brazil) BRA	Jordi	4	0	4	0	--	--	--	--
42	DF	(Brazil) BRA	Carlos César	18	2	13+2	2	3	0	--	--
44	GK	(Brazil) BRA	Rafael Copetti	0	0	--	--	--	--	--	--
49	MF	(Brazil) BRA	Lucas Crispim	13	2	4+8	2	0+1	0	--	--
Youth academy's players who participated during the season: (Statistics shown are the appearances made and goals scored while at Vasco da Gama first squad)
23	FW	(Brazil) BRA	Marquinhos	7	0	2+2	0	1+2	0	--	--
27	FW	(Brazil) BRA	Yago	12	1	4+4	1	1+3	0	--	--
29	MF	(Brazil) BRA	Jhon Cley	10	1	4+6	1	--	--	--	--
36	DF	(Brazil) BRA	Lorran	13	0	9+2	0	1+1	0	--	--
37	DF	(Brazil) BRA	Henrique	4	0	0+1	0	--	--	2+1	0
39	FW	(Brazil) BRA	Thalles	43	10	17+6	3	5+2	3	3+10	4
Players who left the club during the season: (Statistics shown are the appearances made and goals scored while at Vasco da Gama)
22	MF	(Brazil) BRA	Abuda (released, free transfer to Chapecoense)	4	0	--	--	--	--	1+3	0
31	MF	(Brazil) BRA	Bernardo (loaned to Palmeiras)	14	3	--	--	1	0	3+10	3
19	FW	(Brazil) BRA	William Barbio (loaned to Bahia)	13	1	0+2	0	--	--	7+4	1
18	MF	(Brazil) BRA	Danilo (traded to Sporting de Braga)	9	0	3	0	3	0	1+2	0
6	MF	(Brazil) BRA	Fellipe Bastos (loaned to Grêmio)	26	1	5+1	0	4	0	13+3	1
23	FW	(Brazil) BRA	Reginaldo (end of contract)	14	3	2	1	2	0	8+2	2

=== Goalkeeper statistics ===
No.	Nat.	Player	Total			Brasileirão Série B			Copa do Brasil			Rio de Janeiro State Championship		
No.	Nat.	Player	PLD	GA	GAA	PLD	GA	GAA	PLD	GA	GAA	PLD	GA	GAA
1	URU	Martín Silva	45	39	0.86	25	26	1.04	5	3	0.60	15	10	0.67
25	BRA	Diogo Silva	16	15	0.93	9	9	1.00	3	3	1.00	4	3	0.75
40	BRA	Jordi	4	1	0.25	4	1	0.25	0	0	0.00	0	0	0.00
44	BRA	Rafael Copetti	0	0	0.00	0	0	0.00	0	0	0.00	0	0	0.00

Updated to match played 29 November 2014
Italic: denotes player is no longer with team

=== Top scorers ===
Ran	No.	Pos	Nat	Name	Brasileirão Série B	Copa do Brasil	Rio de Janeiro State Championship	Total
1	7	FW	(Brazil)	Edmílson	3	0	11	14
1	10	MF	(Brazil)	Douglas	10	2	2	14
3	39	FW	(Brazil)	Thalles	3	3	4	10
4	30	FW	(Brazil)	Kléber	5	1	0	6
4	35	DF	(Brazil)	Douglas Silva	5	1	0	6
6	3	DF	(Brazil)	Rodrigo	4	0	1	5
7	16	DF	(Brazil)	Marlon	2	0	2	4
7	20	MF	(Brazil)	Dakson	4	0	0	4
9	11	MF	(Colombia)	Santiago Montoya	1	0	2	3
9	18	MF	(Uruguay)	Maxiliano Rodríguez	2	1	0	3
9	23	FW	(Brazil)	Reginaldo	1	0	2	3
9	31	MF	(Brazil)	Bernardo	0	0	3	3
13	4	DF	(Brazil)	Rafael Vaz	0	0	2	2
13	12	MF	(Brazil)	Fabrício	2	0	0	2
13	42	DF	(Brazil)	Carlos César	2	0	0	2
13	49	MF	(Brazil)	Lucas Crispim	2	0	0	2
17	2	DF	(Brazil)	André Rocha	0	0	1	1
17	6	MF	(Brazil)	Fellipe Bastos	0	0	1	1
17	17	FW	(Brazil)	Everton Costa	0	0	1	1
17	19	FW	(Brazil)	William Barbio	0	0	1	1
17	22	FW	(Brazil)	Rafael Silva	1	0	0	1
17	26	DF	(Brazil)	Diego Renan	0	1	0	1
17	27	FW	(Brazil)	Yago	1	0	0	1
17	29	MF	(Brazil)	Jhon Cley	1	0	0	1
17	38	MF	(Brazil)	Guilherme Biteco	1	0	0	1
17					0	1	2	3
				TOTALS	50	10	35	94

Last updated: 29 November 2014
Source: Competitive matches

Those in italics are no longer with club.

=== Top assists ===
Ran	No.	Pos	Nat	Name	Brasileirão Série B	Copa do Brasil	Rio de Janeiro State Championship	Total
1	10	MF	(Brazil)	Douglas	6	3	4	13
2	39	FW	(Brazil)	Thalles	4	0	2	6
3	7	FW	(Brazil)	Edmílson	1	0	4	5
3	18	MF	(Uruguay)	Maximiliano Rodríguez	5	0	0	5
5	26	DF	(Brazil)	Diego Renan	1	0	3	4
6	2	DF	(Brazil)	André Rocha	0	0	3	3
6	16	DF	(Brazil)	Marlon	2	0	1	3
6	30	FW	(Brazil)	Kléber	2	1	0	3
9	14	MF	(Paraguay)	Eduardo Aranda	1	0	1	2
9	20	MF	(Brazil)	Dakson	1	0	1	2
9	35	DF	(Brazil)	Douglas Silva	1	1	0	2
12	4	DF	(Brazil)	Rodrigo	0	0	1	1
12	5	MF	(Argentina)	Pablo Guiñazú	1	0	0	1
12	6	MF	(Brazil)	Fellipe Bastos	0	0	1	1
12	10/8	MF	(Brazil)	Pedro Ken	1	0	0	1
12	12	MF	(Brazil)	Fabrício	1	0	0	1
12	17	FW	(Brazil)	Everton Costa	0	0	1	1
12	19	FW	(Brazil)	William Barbio	0	0	1	1
12	23	FW	(Brazil)	Reginaldo	0	0	1	1
12	30/23	FW	(Brazil)	Marquinhos	0	1	0	1
12	31	MF	(Brazil)	Bernardo	0	0	1	1
12	49	MF	(Brazil)	Lucas Crispim	1	0	0	1
				TOTALS	28	6	25	58

Last updated: 29 November 2014
Source: Competitive matches

Those in italics are no longer with club.

=== Clean sheets ===
This list includes all competitive matches and is sorted by shirt number when total clean sheets are equal.

Ran	No.	Pos	Nat	Name	Brasileirão Série B	Copa do Brasil	Rio de Janeiro State Championship	Total
1	1	GK	(Uruguay)	Martín Silva	7	2	6	15
2	25	GK	(Brazil)	Diogo Silva	3	1	1	5
3	40	GK	(Brazil)	Jordi	3	0	0	3
4	44	GK	(Brazil)	Rafael Copetti	0	0	0	0
				TOTALS	13	3	7	23

Last updated: 8 November 2014
Source: Competitive matches

Those in italics are no longer with club.

=== Disciplinary record ===
R	No.	Pos	Nat	Name	Brasileirão Série B			Copa do Brasil			Rio de Janeiro State Championship			Total		
R	No.	Pos	Nat	Name	Booked	(yellow card) (yellow-red card)	Sent off (straight red)	Booked	(yellow card) (yellow-red card)	Sent off (straight red)	Booked	(yellow card) (yellow-red card)	Sent off (straight red)	Booked	(yellow card) (yellow-red card)	Sent off (straight red)
1	5	MF	(Argentina)	Pablo Guiñazú	9	0	0	1	0	0	7	0	0	17	0	0
2	10	MF	(Brazil)	Douglas	8	0	0	2	0	1	3	0	0	13	0	1
3	2	DF	(Brazil)	André Rocha	1	0	0	1	0	0	6	0	1	8	0	1
3	11	MF	(Colombia)	Santiago Montoya	3	0	0	4	0	0	2	0	0	9	0	0
3	14	MF	(Paraguay)	Eduardo Aranda	4	0	0	1	0	0	4	0	0	9	0	0
3	3	DF	(Brazil)	Rodrigo	5	0	0	1	0	0	3	0	0	9	0	0
7	1	GK	(Uruguay)	Martín Silva	4	0	0	0	0	0	4	0	0	8	0	0
7	10/8	MF	(Brazil)	Pedro Ken	4	0	0	0	0	0	2	1	0	6	1	0
7	26	DF	(Brazil)	Diego Renan	4	0	0	2	0	0	2	0	0	8	0	0
10	12	MF	(Brazil)	Fabrício	5	0	0	0	1	0	0	0	0	5	1	0
10	21	DF	(Brazil)	Luan	2	0	1	0	0	0	4	0	0	6	0	1
12	6	MF	(Brazil)	Fellipe Bastos	0	0	0	1	0	0	5	0	0	6	0	0
12	35	DF	(Brazil)	Douglas Silva	4	0	0	2	0	0	0	0	0	6	0	0
14	16	DF	(Brazil)	Marlon	3	0	0	0	0	0	2	0	0	5	0	0
14	30	FW	(Brazil)	Kléber	4	0	0	1	0	0	0	0	0	5	0	0
14	39	FW	(Brazil)	Thalles	3	0	0	0	0	0	2	0	0	5	0	0
17	20	MF	(Brazil)	Dakson	4	0	0	0	0	0	0	0	0	4	0	0
18	7	FW	(Brazil)	Edmílson	3	0	0	0	0	0	0	0	0	3	0	0
18	31	MF	(Brazil)	Bernardo	0	0	0	1	0	0	2	0	0	3	0	0
20	17	FW	(Brazil)	Everton Costa	0	0	0	0	0	0	0	1	0	0	1	0
20	23	FW	(Brazil)	Reginaldo	0	0	0	0	0	0	2	0	0	2	0	0
20	25	GK	(Brazil)	Diogo Silva	1	0	0	1	0	0	0	0	0	2	0	0
20	37	DF	(Brazil)	Henrique	1	0	0	0	0	0	1	0	0	2	0	0
20	38	MF	(Brazil)	Guilherme Biteco	2	0	0	0	0	0	0	0	0	2	0	0
20	42	DF	(Brazil)	Carlos César	2	0	0	0	0	0	0	0	0	2	0	0
26	4	DF	(Brazil)	Rafael Vaz	0	0	0	1	0	0	0	0	0	1	0	0
26	18	MF	(Brazil)	Danilo	0	0	0	1	0	0	0	0	0	1	0	0
26	19	FW	(Brazil)	William Barbio	0	0	0	0	0	0	1	0	0	1	0	0
26	22	FW	(Brazil)	Rafael Silva	1	0	0	0	0	0	0	0	0	1	0	0
26	28	DF	(Brazil)	Jomar	0	0	0	0	0	0	1	0	0	1	0	0
26	29	MF	(Brazil)	Jhon Cley	1	0	0	0	0	0	0	0	0	1	0	0
26	49	MF	(Brazil)	Lucas Crispim	1	0	0	0	0	0	0	0	0	1	0	0
				TOTALS	80	0	1	20	1	1	53	2	1	153	3	3

Last updated: 10 October 2014
Source: Competitive matches

Those in italics are no longer with the club.

=== Captains ===
Accounts for all competitions. Last updated on 29 November 2014.

No.	Pos.	Name	Games
5	MF	(Argentina) Pablo Guiñazú	45
10	MF	(Brazil) Douglas	10
4	DF	(Brazil) Rodrigo	7
6	MF	(Brazil) Fellipe Bastos	2
10/8	MF	(Brazil) Pedro Ken	1

=== Starting eleven ===
All competitions.

No.	Pos.	Nat.	Name	MS	Notes
1	GK	(Uruguay)	Silva	45	Diogo Silva has 16 starts Jordi has 4 starts
2	RB	(Brazil)	André Rocha	28	Carlos César has 16 starts
21	CB	(Brazil)	Luan	45	Jomar has 2 starts Anderson Salles has 3 starts
3	CB	(Brazil)	Rodrigo	44	Douglas Silva has 31 starts Rafael Vaz has 7 starts
26	LB	(Brazil)	Diego Renan	45	Marlon has 28 starts Lorran has 10 starts Henrique has 2 starts
5	DM	(Argentina)	Guiñazú	45	Aranda has 30 starts Abuda has 1 start
8	CM	(Brazil)	Pedro Ken	28	Fabrício has 28 starts Fellipe Bastos has 22 starts Danilo has 7 starts
10	AM	(Brazil)	Douglas	53	Dakson has 15 starts Rodríguez has 15 starts Jhon Cley has 4 starts
11	AM	(Colombia)	Montoya	11	Guilherme Biteco has 5 starts Lucas Crispim has 4 starts Bernardo has 4 starts
27	SS	(Brazil)	Yago	5	Everton Costa has 8 starts Marquinhos has 3 starts Rafael Silva has 4 starts Reginaldo has 12 starts William Barbio has 7 starts
30	ST	(Brazil)	Kléber	28	Thalles has 25 starts Edmílson has 25 starts

Last updated: 29 November 2014
Source: Squad statistics and Start formations
Only competitive matches.
Using the most used start formation.
Ordered by position on pitch (from back right to front left).

=== International call-ups ===
No.	P	Name	Country	Level	Caps	Goals	Opposition	Competition	Source
1	GK	Martín Silva	Uruguay	Senior	Tot.	Tot.	vs. Austria (March 5) vs. Northern Ireland (May 31) vs. Slovenia (June 5) vs. Japan (September 5) vs. (South Korea) South Korea ✓ (September 8) vs. Saudi Arabia (October 10) vs. (Oman) Oman ✓ (October 13)	Friendly	
1	GK	Martín Silva	Uruguay	Senior	Tot.	Tot.	vs. Costa Rica (June 14) vs. England (June 19) vs. Italy (June 24) vs. Colombia (June 28)	FIFA World Cup	
18	MF	Danilo	Brazil	Under-20	Tot.	Tot.	vs. Mexico U20 ✓ (January 26) vs. Amapá ✓ (February 15)	Friendly	
36	DF	Lorran	Brazil	Under-20	Tot.	Tot.		L'Alcúdia International Football Tournament	
39	FW	Thalles	Brazil	Under-20	Tot.	Tot.	vs. Mexico U20 ✓ (January 26) vs. Guarani ✓ (April 16) vs. (Bolivia) Bolivia ✓ (October 10) vs. United States U23 ✓ (October 13)	Friendly	
39	FW	Thalles	Brazil	Under-20	Tot.	Tot.	vs. South Korea U20 ✓ (May 22) vs. Colombia U20 ✓ (May 24) vs. England U20 ✓ (May 26) vs. Qatar U20 (May 30) vs. France U20 ✓ (June 1)	Tournoi Espoirs de Toulon 2014	
39	FW	Thalles	Brazil	Under-20	Tot.			L'Alcúdia International Football Tournament	

== See also ==
- 2014 Rio de Janeiro State Championship
- 2014 Brasileirão Série B
- 2014 Copa do Brasil
