= Nnadozie =

Nnadozie is both a given name and a surname. Notable people with the name include:

- Nnadozie Ugonna Ezenwaka (born 1994), Nigerian footballer
- Chiamaka Nnadozie (born 2000), Nigerian footballer
- Emmanuel Nnadozie (fl. 1980–2019), Nigerian educator
