= Thabani Mthembu =

South African soccer player

Personal information
- Full name: Thabani Mthembu
- Date of birth: 17 July 1994 (age 32)
- Place of birth: Pinetown, South Africa
- Position: Striker

Youth career
- Fast Movers
- Mvuzane Blue Aces
- 2010–2011: Kaizer Chiefs

Senior career*
Years	Team	Apps	(Gls)
2012–2014	Platinum Stars	19	(0)
2014–2017	Supersport United	1	(0)
2015	→ Vasco da Gama (loan)	11	(1)
2015–2016	→ Santos (loan)	14	(1)
2021	TS Sporting	4	(0)

International career^{‡}
2012	South African U-20	5	(5)
2013	South Africa	2	(0)
- * Club domestic league appearances and goals as of 7 October 2022 ‡ National team caps and goals as of 7 October 2022

Thabani Mthembu (born 17 July 1994) is a South African professional soccer player who last played for TS Sporting as a striker.

== Club career ==
Mthembu began his youth career playing for local sides Fast Movers and Mvuzane Blue Aces prior to joining the Kaizer Chiefs academy. He only spent one year at Chiefs before he was suspended for suspected age cheating.

He then moved to Vodacom League side Young Mates FC before joining Platinum Stars on a three-year deal in June 2012 after impressing in the 2012 Cape Town International Challenge. He made his debut for Dikwena on 27 October 2012 in a 4–0 over Free State Stars at Royal Bafokeng Stadium, coming on, in the 85th minute. In Mthembu's two seasons at Stars, Mthembu played 19 league games but did not score any goals and he was not in the match day squads when Stars won the MTN8 and Telkom Knockout.

He joined Supersport United in July 2014, as a free agent as his contract was not renewed, after he went for trials. During his trials he scored against cross-town rivals Mamelodi Sundowns in the Gauteng Cup. He made his league debut for Matsatsantsa on 9 August 2014 in a 1–0 loss to Bidvest Wits, coming in as a substitute and played 18 minutes. He was sent on loan to Vasco da Gama.

== International career ==
Mthembu has played for the South African under-20 team and was the top scorer with 5 goals at the 2012 Cape Town International Challenge.

He was part of the South Africa squad for the 2013 COSAFA Cup and made his senior debut against Zambia on his 19th birthday. He was capped twice.
