= Luan Garcia =

Brazilian footballer

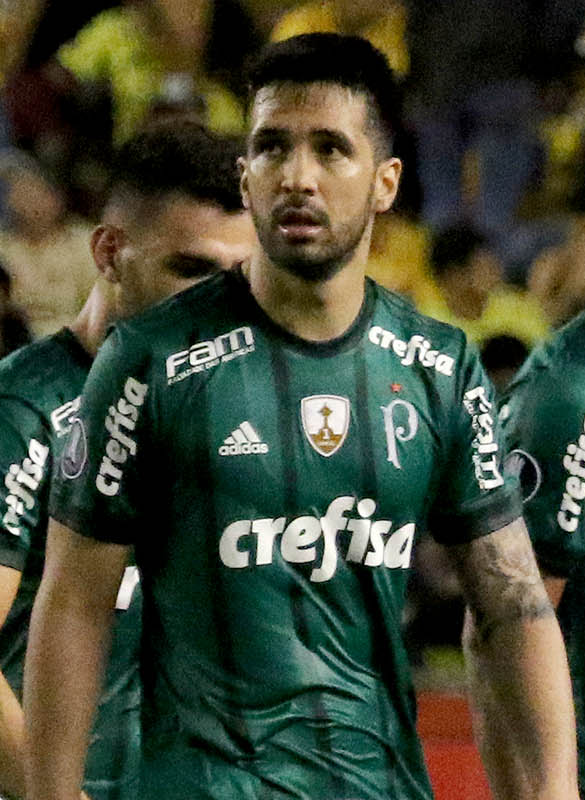

Personal information
- Full name: Luan Garcia Teixeira
- Date of birth: 10 May 1993 (age 33)
- Place of birth: Vitória, Brazil
- Height: 1.88 m (6 ft 2 in)
- Position: Centre back

Team information
- Current team: Toluca
- Number: 13

Youth career
- 2006–2013: Vasco da Gama

Senior career*
Years	Team	Apps	(Gls)
2012–2017	Vasco da Gama	149	(11)
2017–2024	Palmeiras	191	(7)
2024–	Toluca	17	(2)

International career^{‡}
2013	Brazil U20	10	(0)
2016	Brazil Olympic	2	(0)
Medal record
Olympic Games
Gold medal – first place	2016 Rio de Janeiro	Team
Pan American Games
Bronze medal – third place	2015 Toronto	Team
- * Club domestic league appearances and goals as of 22:29, 10 November 2024 (UTC) ‡ National team caps and goals as of 16 February 2012

Luan Garcia Teixeira (born 10 May 1993), simply known as Luan or Luan Garcia, is a Brazilian footballer who plays as a centre back for Liga MX club Toluca.

== Career statistics ==
As of 6 December 2021

Club	Season	League			State League		National Cup		Continental		Other		Total	
Club	Season	Division	Apps	Goals	Apps	Goals	Apps	Goals	Apps	Goals	Apps	Goals	Apps	Goals
Vasco da Gama	2012	Série A	4	1	0	0	0	0	—		—		4	1
Vasco da Gama	2013	Série A	9	0	2	0	1	0	—		—		12	0
Vasco da Gama	2014	Série B	25	0	18	0	4	0	—		—		47	0
Vasco da Gama	2015	Série A	25	0	16	4	3	0	—		—		44	4
Vasco da Gama	2016	Série B	28	5	16	1	6	0	—		—		50	6
Vasco da Gama	2017	Série A	0	0	6	0	2	0	—		—		8	0
Vasco da Gama	Total		91	6	58	5	16	0	—		—		165	11
Palmeiras	2017	Série A	19	1	—		—		2 (Note: Appearance(s) in Copa Libertadores)	0	—		21	1
Palmeiras	2018	Série A	16	2	2	0	1	0	4	1	—		23	3
Palmeiras	2019	Série A	21	0	6	1	2	0	7	0	—		36	1
Palmeiras	2020	Série A	26	0	6	0	4	0	8	0	2 (Note: Appearance(s) in FIFA Club World Cup)	0	46	0
Palmeiras	2021	Série A	26	1	6	0	2	0	11	0	3 (Note: One appearance in Supercopa do Brasil, two appearances in Recopa Sudamericana)	0	48	1
Palmeiras	Total		108	4	20	1	9	0	32	1	5	0	174	6
Career total			199	10	78	6	25	0	32	1	5	0	339	17

== Honours ==
=== Club ===
Vasco da Gama

- Campeonato Carioca: 2015, 2016

Palmeiras

- Campeonato Brasileiro Série A: 2018, 2022, 2023
- Campeonato Paulista: 2020, 2022, 2023, 2024
- Copa do Brasil: 2020
- Copa Libertadores: 2020, 2021
- Recopa Sudamericana: 2022
- Supercopa do Brasil: 2023
- FIFA Club World Cup Runner Up: 2021

Toluca

- Liga MX: Clausura 2025, Apertura 2025
- Campeón de Campeones: 2025
- Campeones Cup: 2025
- CONCACAF Champions Cup: 2026
- Leagues Cup: 2026

=== International ===
Brazil

- Olympic Gold Medal: 2016

Brazil U20

- 8 Nations International Tournament: 2012

=== Individual ===
- Campeonato Carioca Team of the year: 2014, 2015, 2016
- Campeonato Brasileiro Série B Best Defender: 2016
- Liga MX All-Star: 2025
