= Juan Vivas =

Argentine footballer

Personal information
- Full name: Juan Pablo Vivas
- Date of birth: 19 January 1994 (age 32)
- Place of birth: Marcos Juárez, Argentina
- Height: 1.82 m (5 ft 11 1/2 in)
- Position: Midfielder

Youth career
- 2008–2009: Argentino de Marcos Juárez
- Boca Juniors
- Huracán

Senior career*
Years	Team	Apps	(Gls)
2017–2018	Huracán	0	(0)
2018–2019	Fénix	16	(1)
- * Club domestic league appearances and goals

Juan Pablo Vivas (born 19 January 1994) is an Argentine professional footballer who plays as a midfielder.

== Club career ==
Vivas' senior career got underway with Huracán, following a spell in the club's youth ranks after joining from Boca Juniors; who had signed him from Argentino de Marcos Juárez in 2009. He made his professional debut on 11 July 2017 in the Copa Sudamericana versus Libertad, featuring for the full duration of a 1–5 defeat at the Estadio Tomás Adolfo Ducó; he was also an unused substitute for the return leg weeks later. In August 2018, Vivas joined Primera B Metropolitana side Fénix. He'd appear sixteen times for the club, whilst also netting the first goal of his senior career; versus Almirante Brown on 16 February 2019.

== International career ==
Whilst with Boca Juniors, Vivas was selected to represent the Argentina U20s at the 2012 Cape Town International Challenge.

== Career statistics ==
As of 24 September 2020.

Club statistics
Club	Season	League			Cup		League Cup		Continental		Other		Total	
Club	Season	Division	Apps	Goals	Apps	Goals	Apps	Goals	Apps	Goals	Apps	Goals	Apps	Goals
Huracán	2017–18	Primera División	0	0	0	0	—		1 (Note: Appearance(s) in Copa Sudamericana)	0	0	0	1	0
Fénix	2018–19	Primera B Metropolitana	16	1	0	0	—		—		0	0	16	1
Career total			16	1	0	0	—		1	0	0	0	17	1
