= 2010 Cape Town International Challenge =

Tournament details
- Host country: South Africa
- City: Cape Town
- Dates: 8 - 10 April
- Teams: 4
- Venue(s): 2 (in 1 host city)

The Cape Town International Challenge was an international tournament which took place in April 2010. The competition was created by the South African Football Association to try out the new infrastructure in time for the 2010 FIFA World Cup. The competition was won by the Nigerian under 20 national football team.

8 April 2010
14:00

Ghana	1-1	Nigeria
	report

Newlands Stadium
8 April 2010
16:30

South Africa	3-2	Brazil
	report

Newlands Stadium
10 April 2010
16:00

South Africa	1-3	Nigeria
	report

Cape Town Stadium
10 April 2010
18:30

Ghana	0-1	Brazil
	report

Cape Town Stadium

Team	Pld	W	D	L	GF	GA	GD	Pts
Nigeria	2	1	1	0	4	2	2	4
Brazil	2	1	0	1	3	3	0	3
South Africa	2	1	0	1	4	5	-1	3
Ghana	2	0	1	1	1	2	-1	1
