= Nkosingiphile Gumede =

South African soccer player

Personal information
- Full name: Nkosingiphile Cedric Gumede
- Date of birth: 1 December 1993 (age 32)
- Place of birth: Durban, South Africa
- Height: 1.76 m (5 ft 9 in)
- Position: Goalkeeper

Team information
- Current team: Golden Arrows
- Number: 32

Youth career
- Golden Arrows

Senior career*
Years	Team	Apps	(Gls)
2011–	Golden Arrows	119	(0)
- * Club domestic league appearances and goals as of 1 August 2024

Nkosingiphile Gumede (born 1 December 1993) is a South African soccer player who plays for Golden Arrows as a goalkeeper.

== Club career ==
Gumede is a product of the Golden Arrows youth academy and was promoted to the first-team squad in 2011. He made his debut against Ajax Cape Town in December 2011.

== International career ==
Gumede was called up to the senior South Africa squad for the 2016 COSAFA Cup.
