= Eduardo Aranda =

Paraguayan footballer (born 1985)

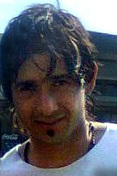
- Aranda in 2011

Personal information
- Full name: Eduardo Lorenzo Aranda
- Date of birth: 28 January 1985 (age 41)
- Place of birth: Asunción, Paraguay
- Height: 1.75 m (5 ft 9 in)
- Position: Midfielder

Youth career
- Olimpia Asunción

Senior career*
Years	Team	Apps	(Gls)
2006	Rampla Juniors	25	(1)
2007–2009	Liverpool	61	(5)
2009–2010	Nacional de Montevideo	10	(1)
2010–2011	Defensor Sporting	35	(5)
2011–2013	Olimpia Asunción	83	(2)
2014	Vasco da Gama	20	(0)
2014–2015	Olimpia Asunción	31	(1)
2016–2017	JEF United Chiba	43	(2)
2018	Deportivo Santaní	40	(0)
2019	Deportivo Capiatá	28	(0)
2020	Cusco	7	(0)
2020–2021	Guaireña	9	(0)
2022	Resistencia Sport Club	14	(0)

International career^{‡}
2012–	Paraguay	5	(0)
- * Club domestic league appearances and goals as of 22:10, 2 May 2020 (UTC) ‡ National team caps and goals as of 23 September 2016

Eduardo Aranda (born 28 January 1985) is a Paraguayan professional footballer who plays as a midfielder.

== Club career ==
Aranda was born in Asunción. From 2003 to 2005, he formed part of Olimpia Asunción's U20 squad.

After not having a chance with the first team, emigrated to Uruguay to try his luck with Rampla Juniors. In 2006, Aranda joined the club, colleaguing with compatriot Arnaldo Villalba.

He played a season and a half with that team, until he was transferred to Liverpool Montevideo, teaming up with Cameroon footballer Martin Kamga.

On 31 July 2009, he signed a new deal with Uruguays giants Club Nacional de Football. He only remained one season in the giants, then signing with Defensor Sporting.

In mid June 2011, he returned to his country to sign a new contract with his origin club Olimpia. He played a vital role in his team becoming champions of the 2011 Clausura after the club suffered eleven years without a title. After improving a lot during the 2012 season Aranda makes a good 2013 Copa Libertadores

=== Resistencia ===
Aranda renounced from Guaireña to join second-tier Resistencia Sport Club, and held the objective of ascending to the Primera División whilst the club was in second place of the second-tier table. Aranda spoke with Carlos Recalde, who previously was his coach at Deportivo Capiatá, and expressed that he wanted to depart Guaireña and see the possibility of playing at Resistencia. He joined Julian Benitez and Rodrigo Burgos in the Resistencia squad.

== International career ==
On 9 June 2012, Aranda made his debut for Paraguay in a 2014 FIFA World Cup qualification match against Bolivia.

== Honors ==
Olimpia

- Paraguayan Primera División: 2011 Clausura
