= Felipe Klein =

Brazilian footballer (born 1987)

Personal information
- Full name: Felipe Ely Klein
- Date of birth: 9 April 1987 (age 39)
- Place of birth: Porto Alegre, Brazil
- Height: 1.77 m (5 ft 10 in)
- Position: Striker

Team information
- Current team: Juventud
- Number: 19

Youth career
- –2008: Internacional

Senior career*
Years	Team	Apps	(Gls)
2008–2009	Porto Alegre	25	(10)
2009–2010	Canoas	8	(0)
2010–2011	Ferroviário	22	(8)
2011	Fortaleza	9	(0)
2011–2013	Cerro Largo	57	(2)
2014–2015	Icasa	31	(7)
2015	Passo Fundo	12	(1)
2015	Glória		
2015–2021	Cerro	136	(3)
2022	Glória		
2023	Sud América	18	(2)
2023–	Juventud	28	(0)
- * Club domestic league appearances and goals as of 7 September 2024

Felipe Ely Klein (born 9 April 1987) is a Brazilian footballer who plays for Juventud of the Uruguayan Segunda División.
