= Junior Sibande =

South African soccer player

Personal information
- Date of birth: 26 June 1993 (age 33)
- Place of birth: Daveyton, South Africa
- Height: 1.75 m (5 ft 9 in)
- Positions: Left back; centre back

Youth career
- Davhana Shooting Stars

Senior career*
Years	Team	Apps	(Gls)
2011–2016	University of Pretoria	51	(1)
2016–2019	Highlands Park	59	(0)
2019–2022	Ajax Cape Town	46	(2)
- * Club domestic league appearances and goals as of 15 November 2022

Junior Sibande (born 26 June 1993 in Daveyton, Gauteng) is a South African football player who last played as a left back or centre back for Ajax Cape Town F.C. in the National First Division.

== Career ==
On 17 August 2019 it was confirmed, that Sibande had joined Ajax Cape Town.
