= Rafael Copetti =

Brazilian footballer (born 1991)

Personal information
- Full name: Rafael Copetti Fernandes
- Date of birth: 4 April 1991 (age 35)
- Place of birth: Chapecó, Brazil
- Height: 1.93 m (6 ft 4 in)
- Position: Goalkeeper

Team information
- Current team: Boavista

Youth career
- 2011: Internacional

Senior career*
| Years | Team | Apps | (Gls) |
| 2011–2014 | Benfica | 0 | (0) |
| 2012 | → União Leiria (loan) | 1 | (0) |
| 2014–2015 | Vasco da Gama | 0 | (0) |
| 2015 | Bragantino | 3 | (0) |
| 2016 | ABC | 0 | (0) |
| 2017 | Serrano-PB | 0 | (0) |
| 2017 | PSTC | 6 | (0) |
| 2017 | Pelotas | 0 | (0) |
| 2018 | Treze | 0 | (0) |
| 2018 | Chapecoense | 0 | (0) |
| 2019 | Sobradinho | 0 | (0) |
| 2019 | América-RN | 0 | (0) |
| 2020– | Gama | 0 | (0) |
- * Club domestic league appearances and goals as of 12:36, 21 January 2020 (UTC)

Rafael Copetti Fernandes (born 4 April 1991) is a Brazilian professional footballer who plays as a goalkeeper for Gama.

== Club career ==
Born in Chapecó in the western area of the state of Santa Catarina, Brazil, Rafael started his career with Internacional. In December 2011, he moved to Europe, signing a five-and-a-half-year deal with Benfica before joining several compatriots on loan at Portuguese club U.D. Leiria. On 20 June 2014, he returned to Brazil, signing for Vasco da Gama. In May 2015 he was loaned to Bragantino to play in 2015 Campeonato Brasileiro Série B, due to lack of opportunity at Vasco.

In 2016 Rafael signed for ABC, but a knee injury in pre-season left him requiring surgery, and he made no appearances for the club. He returned to action in 2017 with Serrano-PB in 2017 Campeonato Paraibano. Upon completion of the tournament in April, he signed for PSTC to play in 2017 Campeonato Brasileiro Série D.

On 20 November 2017, Rafael was presented as a new signing for a second Paraíba club, Treze, but was released in April after the club was knocked out of the state championship. In August 2018 he signed for Chapecoense until the end of the 2018, however he made no appearances for the team and was released at the end of the season.

In January 2019, Rafael signed for Sobradinho, but after playing just one match in Campeonato Brasiliense he moved to América-RN. In December 2019 he signed for Gama.
