= Richard de Souza =

Trinidadian cricketer

Personal information
- Born: 1 March 1948; Trinidad
- Died: 11 October 2007 (aged 59); Trinidad
- Batting: Right-handed
- Bowling: Right-arm medium
- Role: Batsman

Domestic team information
- Years: Team
- 1964/65–1972/73: Trinidad and Tobago

Career statistics
Competition	First-class
Matches	34
Runs scored	1,936
Batting average	43.02
100s/50s	3/15
Top score	106
Catches/stumpings	17/–
- Source: ESPNcricinfo, 7 April 2022

Richard de Souza (1 March 1948 – 11 October 2007) was a Trinidadian cricketer who played as a batsman. He played 34 first-class matches for Trinidad and Tobago between 1964/65 and 1972/73.

== Playing career ==
De Souza featured as a right handed middle order batsman in his cricketing career. Under the captaincy of Joey Carew, he helped Trinidad and Tobago cop consecutive Shell Shield titles in 1970 and 1971. He eventually scored 3 hundreds and 15 half centuries at an average of 43.02 in his first class career.

== Personal life ==
De Souza died in October 2007 from cancer at the age of 59.
