= Marquinhos do Sul =

Brazilian footballer (born 1994)

Personal information
- Full name: Marcos do Sul Bezerra
- Date of birth: February 22, 1994 (age 32)
- Place of birth: Rio de Janeiro, Brazil
- Height: 1.67 m (5 ft 6 in)
- Position: Winger

Team information
- Current team: America-RJ (on loan from Rio São Paulo)

Youth career
- 1999–2004: Madureira (futsal)
- 2004–2006: Madureira
- 2006–2014: Vasco da Gama

Senior career*
Years	Team	Apps	(Gls)
2014–2015	Vasco da Gama	4	(0)
2014–2015	→ Macaé (loan)	1	(0)
2016	Cabofriense	0	(0)
2017	Bahia de Feira	0	(0)
2018	Portuguesa da Ilha	0	(0)
2018	Sergipe	6	(1)
2019	Nova Iguaçu	0	(0)
2019–	Rio São Paulo	0	(0)
2020–	→ America-RJ (loan)	0	(0)
- * Club domestic league appearances and goals as of 21:09, 9 April 2020 (UTC)

Marcos do Sul Bezerra (born 22 February 1994), commonly known as Marquinhos do Sul, is a Brazilian footballer who plays as a winger for America-RJ on loan from Rio São Paulo.
