= Douglas da Silva =

Brazilian footballer (born 1984)

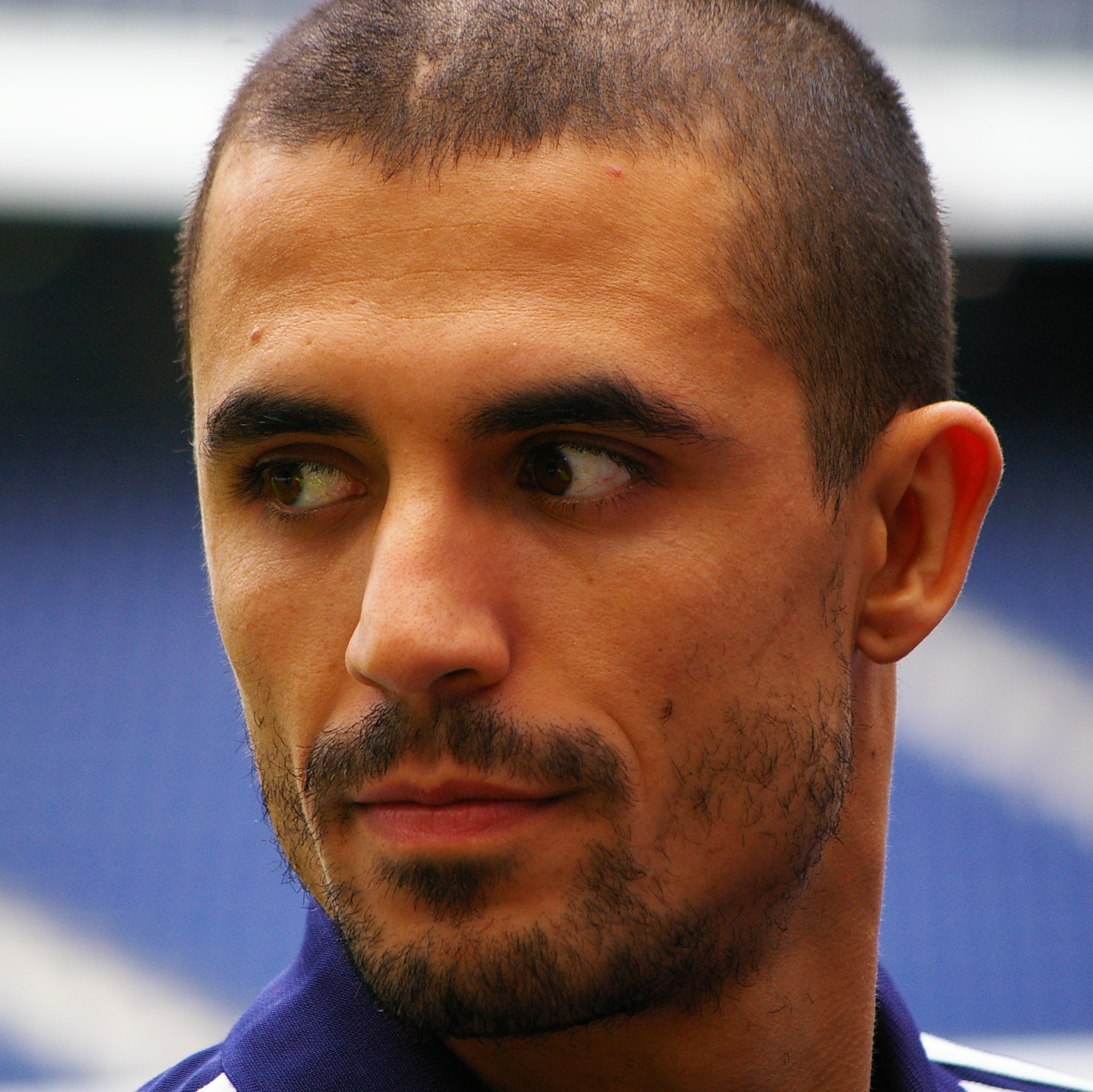

Personal information
- Full name: Douglas da Silva
- Date of birth: 7 March 1984 (age 42)
- Place of birth: Florianópolis, Brazil
- Height: 1.86 m (6 ft 1 in)
- Position: Center back

Team information
- Current team: Brusque

Youth career
- Avaí

Senior career*
Years	Team	Apps	(Gls)
2001–2003	Avaí		
2003–2004	Atlético Paranaense		
2005–2008	Hapoel Kfar Saba	122	(6)
2008–2011	Hapoel Tel Aviv	78	(12)
2011–2014	Red Bull Salzburg	15	(0)
2013	→ Figueirense (loan)	25	(4)
2014	→ Vasco da Gama (loan)	27	(5)
2015	Vasco da Gama	2	(0)
2015–2016	Joinville	8	(0)
2016	C.A. Bragantino	18	(5)
2016–2018	Mladá Boleslav	28	(3)
2018–	Brusque		
- * Club domestic league appearances and goals as of 3 May 2019

Douglas da Silva (born 7 March 1984) is a Brazilian professional association football player who plays for Brusque as a central defender.

== Career ==
Da Silva moved to Israel in 2005 to join Hapoel Kfar Saba. He quickly established himself as one of the best defenders in the Israeli league. After four years playing for Hapoel Kfar Saba he decided to leave the club after they were relegated to the second division and joined one of Israel's top clubs Hapoel Tel Aviv.

After signing with Hapoel Tel Aviv, he played for the first time in UEFA club competitions, In May 2010, he won the country double (both Championship and State Cup). He qualified with Hapoel to the 2010–11 UEFA Champions League Group Stage and on November 24 he scored his first Champions League goal against S.L. Benfica in a 3–0 victory.

On 19 December 2010, he agreed with the Austrian club Red Bull Salzburg where he joined in the transfer window on 11 January 2011, Hapoel Tel Aviv received €2.6 million for the deal, while Da Silva will earn €1 million per year with a five-year contract.

On 5 January 2011, Da Silva was blackmailed by a former teammate. Due to it, his move to Red Bull Salzburg was postponed until 11 January 2011 for police investigation.

In January 2013, he joined Figueirense on a loan deal.

In February 2014, he was loaned to Vasco da Gama. In December 2014, Vasco da Gama signed him on a permanent basis.

In 2016, he signed with Czech First League side Mladá Boleslav on a free transfer. He made his debut on 4 October in a Europa League qualifying match against Tetovo.

== Honours ==
- Israel State Cup (1):
  - 2010
- Israeli Premier League (1):
  - 2009–10
- Austrian League (1):
  - 2011–12
- Austrian Cup (1) :
  - 2011-12

== Career statistics ==
As of 23 December 2010

Club performance			League		Cup		League Cup		Continental		Total	
Season	Club	League	Apps	Goals	Apps	Goals	Apps	Goals	Apps	Goals	Apps	Goals
Brazil			League		Copa do Brasil		League Cup		South America		Total	
2004	Atlético Paranaense	Série A	0	0	0	0	–	–	0	0	0	0
Israel			League		Israel State Cup		Toto Cup		Europe		Total	
2005–2006	Hapoel Kfar Saba	Israeli Premier League	33	1	0	0	8	0	0	0	41	1
2006–2007	Hapoel Kfar Saba	Israeli Premier League	29	3	2	0	10	0	0	0	41	3
2007–2008	Hapoel Kfar Saba	Israeli Premier League	31	3	2	0	6	2	0	0	39	5
2008–2009	Hapoel Tel Aviv	Israeli Premier League	32	3	2	1	5	1	6	1	45	6
2009–2010	Hapoel Tel Aviv	Israeli Premier League	34	6	5	0	3	0	12	0	54	6
2010	Hapoel Tel Aviv	Israeli Premier League	12	3	0	0	2	1	12	2	26	6
Austria			League		Austrian Cup		League Cup		Europe		Total	
2011	Red Bull Salzburg	Bundesliga	0	0	0	0	–	–	0	0	0	0
2011–2012	Red Bull Salzburg	Bundesliga	11	0	2	0	–	–	1	0	14	0
2012–2013	Red Bull Salzburg	Bundesliga	2	0	-	-	–	–	0	0	2	0
Total	Brazil		0	0	0	0	–	–	0	0	0	0
Total	Israel		171	19	11	1	34	4	30	3	246	27
Total	Austria		13	0	2	0	–	–	1	0	16	0
Career total												
