= Andrew Kumagai =

Japanese footballer (born 1993)

Andrew Kumagai 熊谷 アンドリュー
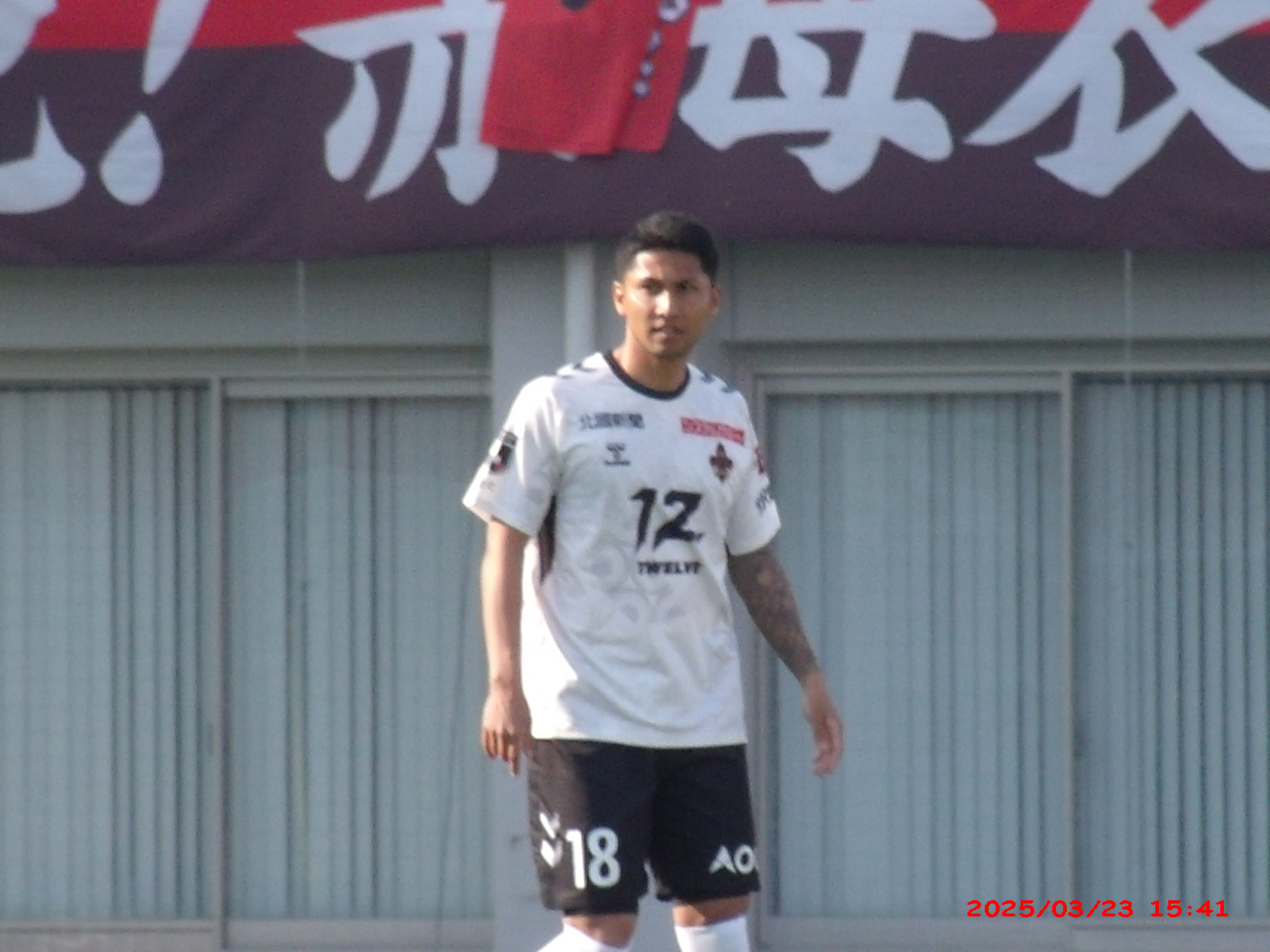

Personal information
- Full name: Andrew Kumagai
- Date of birth: 6 June 1993 (age 33)
- Place of birth: Yokosuka, Kanagawa, Japan
- Height: 1.81 m (5 ft 11 1/2 in)
- Position: Midfielder

Team information
- Current team: Zweigen Kanazawa
- Number: 18

Youth career
- –2011: Yokohama F. Marinos

Senior career*
Years	Team	Apps	(Gls)
2012–2017	Yokohama F. Marinos	17	(1)
2014	→ Shonan Bellmare (loan)	9	(0)
2014–2015	→ J. League U-22 (loan)	2	(0)
2016	→ Zweigen Kanazawa (loan)	32	(2)
2017	→ JEF United Chiba (loan)	31	(0)
2018–2024	JEF United Chiba	152	(2)
2024–	Zweigen Kanazawa	34	(1)

International career
2012	Japan U-20	4	(0)
Medal record
Yokohama F. Marinos
Runner-up	J1 League	2013
Winner	Emperor's Cup	2013
- * Club domestic league appearances and goals as of 1 January 2026

Andrew Kumagai (熊谷 アンドリュー, Kumagai Andoryū; born 6 June 1993) is a Japanese football player who plays as a midfielder for Zweigen Kanazawa. He has also represented the Japan national U-20 team.

== Career ==
On 6 January 2017, Kumagai was loaned to J2 club, JEF United Chiba ahead of 2017 season.

Kumagai officially announced permanent transfer to JEF United Chiba after loan a season in club.

== Personal life ==
Kumagai was born in Kanagawa, Japan. He is Sri Lankan Tamil descent through his father is Sri Lanka and Japanese mother.

== Career statistics ==
=== Club ===
As of the start of 2023 season.

Club	Season	League		Cup^{1}		League Cup^{2}		Total	
Club	Season	Apps	Goals	Apps	Goals	Apps	Goals	Apps	Goals
Yokohama F. Marinos	2012	10	1	2	0	4	0	16	1
Yokohama F. Marinos	2013	4	0	2	0	3	0	9	0
Yokohama F. Marinos	2014	0	0	1	0	0	0	1	0
Shonan Bellmare	2014	9	0	–				9	0
Yokohama F. Marinos	2015	3	0	0	0	4	1	7	1
Zweigen Kanazawa	2016	32	2	2	2	–		34	4
JEF United Chiba	2017	31	0	1	0	–		32	0
JEF United Chiba	2018	40	1	1	0	–		41	1
JEF United Chiba	2019	34	0	0	0	–		34	0
JEF United Chiba	2020	21	0	–				21	0
JEF United Chiba	2021	21	0	2	0	–		23	0
JEF United Chiba	2022	29	1	0	0	–		29	1
JEF United Chiba	2023	0	0	0	0	–		0	0
Total		234	5	12	2	11	1	257	8

^{1}Includes Emperor's Cup.

^{2}Includes J. League Cup.

== Honours ==
Yokohama F. Marinos

- Emperor's Cup: 2013
