= Jacques Onana =

Cameroonian footballer

Personal information
- Full name: Jacques Ghislain Onana Ndzomo
- Date of birth: 23 August 1993 (age 33)
- Height: 1.84 m (6 ft 0 in)
- Position: Defender

Senior career*
Years	Team	Apps	(Gls)
2017–2021	Petrocub Hîncești	91	(2)
- * Club domestic league appearances and goals as of 21:28, 16 March 2022 (UTC)

Jacques Ghislain Onana Ndzomo (born 23 August 1993) is a Cameroonian footballer who plays as a defender.

== Career ==
Onana signed for Moldovan National Division club Petrocub Hîncești in 2017. He made his debut for the club on 30 April 2017 in a 1–0 loss against Dacia Chișinău. On 22 January 2021, he extended his contract with the club. He left the club when his contract expired at the end of 2021.

== Honours ==
Petrocub Hîncești

- Moldovan Cup: 2019–20
