= Misael (footballer, born 1994) =

Brazilian footballer

Personal information
- Full name: Misael Bueno
- Date of birth: 15 July 1994 (age 32)
- Place of birth: Três de Maio, Brazil
- Height: 1.75 m (5 ft 9 in)
- Position: Midfielder

Youth career
- 2011–2013: Grêmio
- 2013: Santos

Senior career*
| Years | Team | Apps | (Gls) |
| 2012–2016 | Deportivo Maldonado | 4 | (0) |
| 2012–2013 | → Grêmio (loan) | 3 | (0) |
| 2013–2014 | → Santos (loan) | 0 | (0) |
| 2014–2015 | → Coritiba (loan) | 7 | (0) |
| 2016 | → Freamunde (loan) | 0 | (0) |
| 2017 | Rio Verde-GO | 0 | (0) |
| 2019 | Lajeadense | 0 | (0) |
| 2020 | Veranópolis | 0 | (0) |
| Total | | 14 | (0) |

International career^{‡}
| 2011–2012 | Brazil U17 | 6 | (1) |
| 2013 | Brazil U20 | 4 | (1) |
- * Club domestic league appearances and goals as of 20 July 2013 ‡ National team caps and goals as of 20 July 2013

Misael Bueno (born 15 July 1994), known as just Misael, is a Brazilian retired footballer who played as a midfielder.

== Career ==
Misael finished his formation in Grêmio FBPA, and made his first team debut on 20 January 2013, in a 0–2 away win against Esportivo de Bento Gonçalves. He also featured against SC Canoas and SC Internacional. In March, he was linked to a move for Avaí FC, but nothing came of it. In June, he was released by Grêmio.

On 19 July 2013, Misael signed a two-year loan deal with Santos FC.
