= Asive Langwe =

South African soccer player

Personal information
- Full name: Asive Langwe
- Date of birth: 20 June 1993 (age 33)
- Place of birth: Libode, South Africa
- Position: Midfielder

Team information
- Current team: AmaZulu F.C.
- Number: 18

Youth career
- Taung United
- Two For Joy
- FC AK
- Bidvest Wits

Senior career*
Years	Team	Apps	(Gls)
2010–2015	Bidvest Wits	48	(4)
2015–	AmaZulu F.C.	0	(0)
- * Club domestic league appearances and goals as of 11 July 2013 ‡ National team caps and goals as of 11 July 2013

Asive Langwe (born 20 June 1993) is a South African football (soccer) midfielder for Premier Soccer League club Bidvest Wits.
