= Daniel Sowatey =

Ghanaian footballer

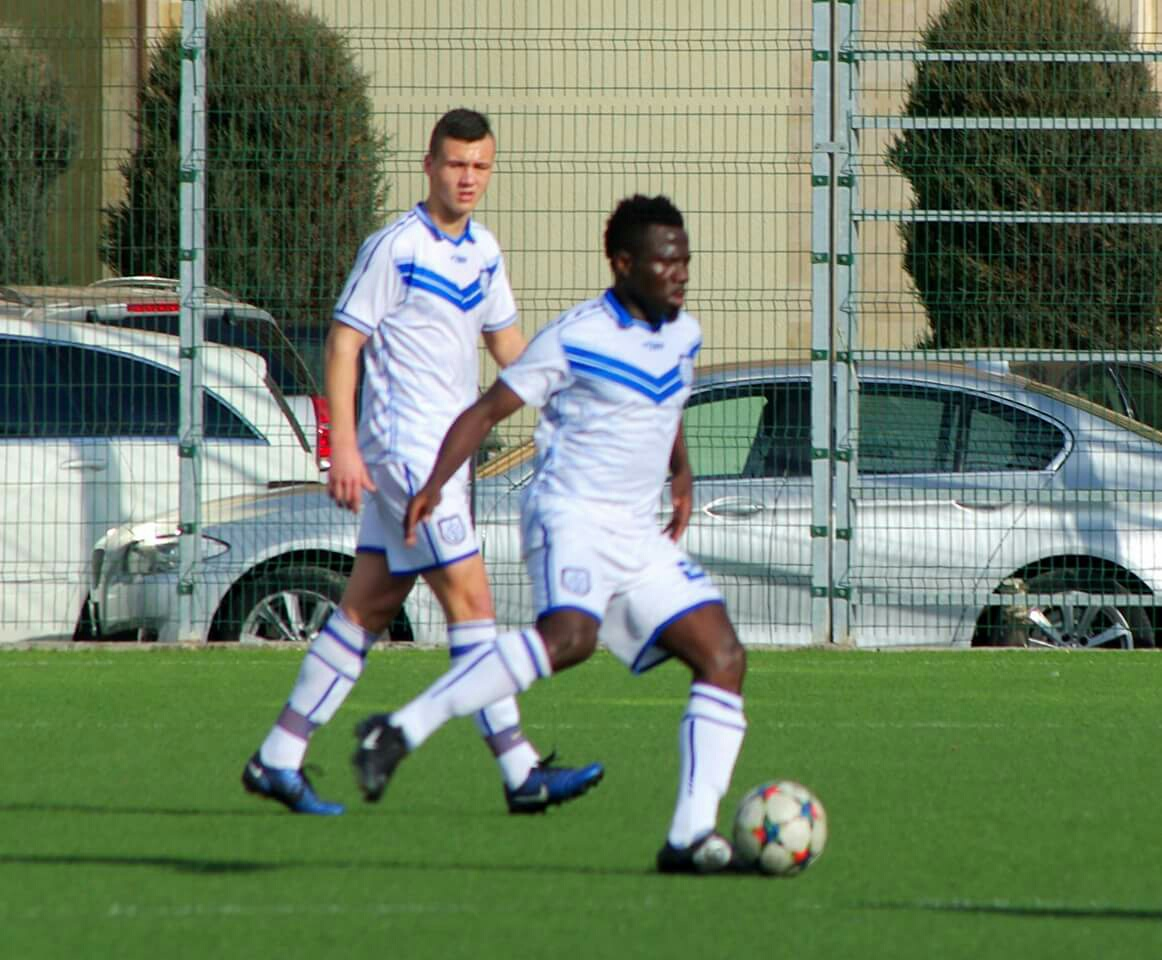
- 2016 by Daniel Sowatey 20

Personal information
- Date of birth: 1 July 1994 (age 32)
- Place of birth: Accra
- Height: 1.78 m (5 ft 10 in)
- Position: Center back

Team information
- Current team: Vittoriossa Stars FC
- Number: 20

Senior career*
Years	Team	Apps	(Gls)
2010–2012	Accra Great Olympics		
2012–2013	Slivniski Geroi		
2013	Bechem United		
2013–2014	Muangthong United		
2014–2015	Amidaus Professionals		
2015–2016	FC Shumen 1929		
2016–2017	Xagħra United F.C.		
2017–2019	Victoria Hotspurs FC		

International career
2012	Ghana U20		
- * Club domestic league appearances and goals

Daniel Sowatey (born 1 July 1994) is a Ghanaian footballer who current plays for Vittoriossa Stars F.C. as a center back.

In 2012, coach Orlando Wellington recruited him to be a member of the Ghana U20 for Eight nation tournament in South Africa.

He signed a contract with the Bulgarian team FC Shumen 1929, before the 2015/16 season. In August 2016 Daniel Sowatey signed with Xagħra United F.C. for the Gozo Football League First Division and has played a full season with currently having 5 goals in his career there. MVP of October month, player of the month voted by the federation

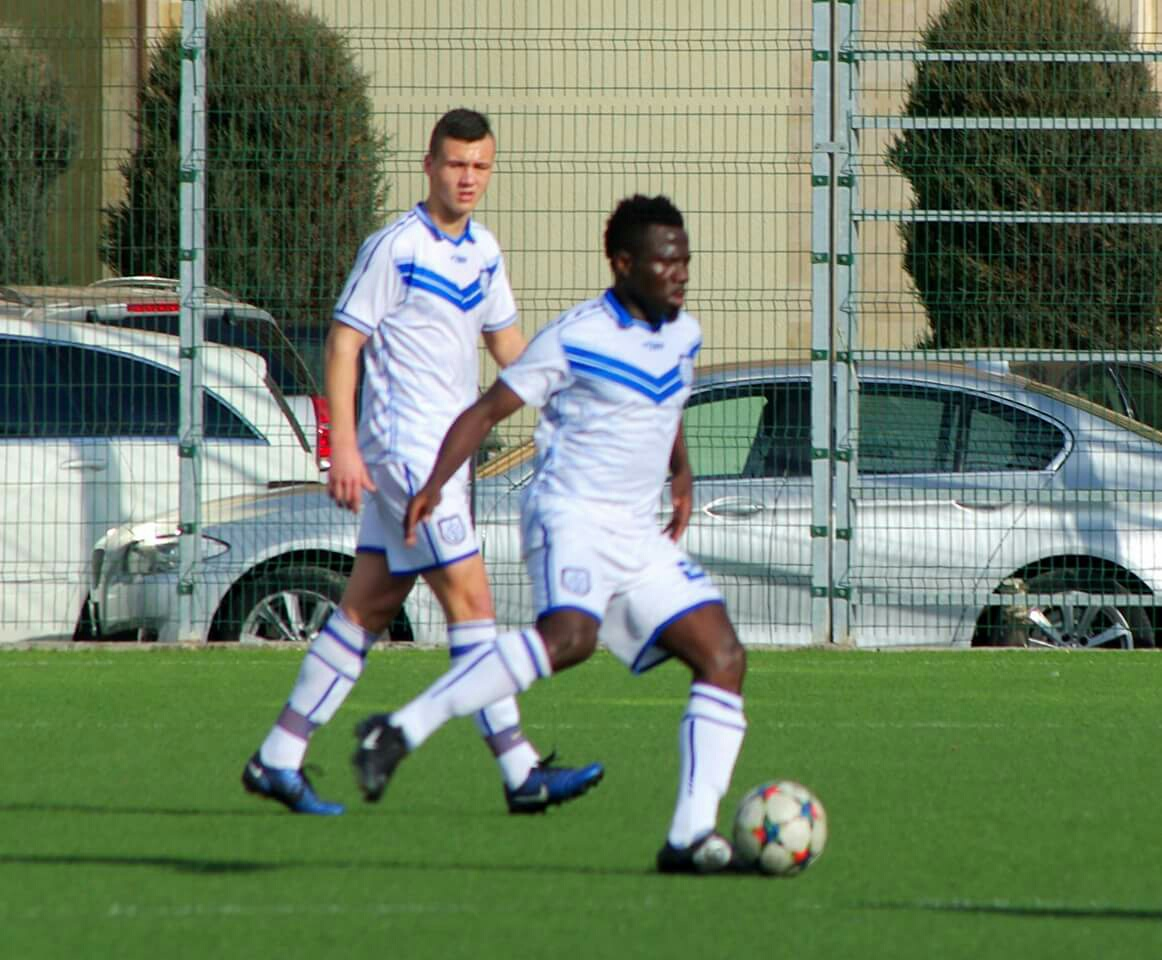
