= Ikechukwu Okorie =

Nigerian footballer

Personal information
- Full name: Ikechukwu Okorie
- Date of birth: 18 November 1993 (age 32)
- Place of birth: Abia, Nigeria
- Height: 1.78 m (5 ft 10 in)
- Position: Defender

Senior career*
Years	Team	Apps	(Gls)
2012	Kaduna United	23	
2013	Enyimba International	5	
2014	Al Masry	4	
2015–2017	Amanat Baghdad		
2019	Al-Bahri	11	
2025–	Racing Club Beirut	8	

International career
2013	Nigeria U-20	15	(0)
- * Club domestic league appearances and goals

Ikechukwu Okorie (born 18 November 1993) is a Nigerian professional footballer who plays as a defender.
