= Denis Neves =

Brazilian footballer (born 1990)

Personal information
- Full name: Denis Neves Rezende da Silva
- Date of birth: 22 April 1990 (age 36)
- Place of birth: Pirassununga, Brazil
- Height: 1.78 m (5 ft 10 in)
- Position: Left back

Team information
- Current team: Guarani

Senior career*
Years	Team	Apps	(Gls)
2010–2013	Coritiba	21	(2)
2011	→ Boa Esporte (loan)		
2011	→ Nova Iguaçu (loan)		
2012	→ Rio Branco–PR (loan)		
2012	→ Oeste (loan)	9	(2)
2013	→ Joinville (loan)	1	(0)
2014	Oeste	26	(3)
2015	Botafogo–SP	0	(0)
2015–	Guarani	16	(0)
- * Club domestic league appearances and goals as of 19 January 2017

Denis Neves Rezende da Silva (born 22 April 1990), known as Denis Neves, is a Brazilian footballer who plays for Guarani as a left back.

== Career statistics ==
As of 19 January 2017

Club	Season	League			State League		Cup		Conmebol		Other		Total	
Club	Season	Division	Apps	Goals	Apps	Goals	Apps	Goals	Apps	Goals	Apps	Goals	Apps	Goals
Coritiba	2010	Série B	7	1	—		0	0	—		—		7	1
Coritiba	2011	Série A	—		4	0	1	0	—		—		5	0
Coritiba	2012	Série A	11	1	—		—		—		—		11	1
Coritiba	2013	Série A	3	0	1	0	1	0	—		—		5	0
Coritiba	Subtotal		21	2	5	0	2	0	—		—		28	2
Rio Branco–PR	2012	Paranaense	—		19	5	—		—		—		19	5
Oeste	2012	Série C	9	2	—		—		—		—		9	2
Joinville	2013	Série B	1	0	—		—		—		—		1	0
Oeste	2014	Série B	26	3	9	0	—		—		—		35	3
Botafogo–SP	2015	Série D	—		12	0	—		—		—		12	0
Guarani	2015	Série C	4	0	—		—		—		—		4	0
Guarani	2016	Série C	12	0	15	1	—		—		—		27	1
Guarani	Subtotal		16	0	15	1	—		—		—		31	1
Career total			73	7	60	6	2	0	0	0	0	0	135	13
