= Thalles =

Thalles may refer to:

- Thalles (footballer, born 1995) (1995–2019), full name Thalles Lima de Conceição Penha, Brazilian football striker
- Thalles (footballer, born 1998), full name Thalles Gabriel Morais dos Reis, Brazilian football midfielder

== See also ==
- Thales (disambiguation)
