= Mumuni Abubakar =

Ghanaian footballer

Personal information
- Date of birth: 3 December 1993 (age 32)
- Position: Midfielder

Team information
- Current team: Black Leopards

Senior career*
Years	Team	Apps	(Gls)
2013–2017	Black Leopards	65	(5)
2015–2016	Stellenbosch (loan)	17	(0)
2017	Free State Stars	3	(0)
2018	Richards Bay	22	(0)
2019	Royal Egales	3	(0)
2019–	Black Leopards	19	(0)
- * Club domestic league appearances and goals as of 1 September 2020

Mumuni Abubakar (born 3 December 1993) is a Ghanaian football midfielder who currently plays for Black Leopards.
