= Everton Costa =

Brazilian footballer (born 1986)

Personal information
- Full name: Everton Santos da Costa
- Date of birth: January 6, 1986 (age 40)
- Place of birth: Ponta Grossa, Brazil
- Height: 1.81 m (5 ft 11 in)
- Position: Forward

Youth career
- 2003–2005: Adap Galo Maringá
- 2006: → Grêmio (loan)

Senior career*
Years	Team	Apps	(Gls)
2006	Adap Galo Maringá		
2007	→ Grêmio (loan)		
2008	→ Paulista (loan)		
2008–2009	→ Fredrikstad (loan)	39	(6)
2010–2011	Caxias	28	(9)
2010	→ Internacional (loan)	10	(0)
2010	→ Bahia (loan)	11	(2)
2011–2014	Coritiba	47	(4)
2013	→ Santos (loan)	16	(2)
2014	→ Vasco da Gama (loan)	0	(0)
- * Club domestic league appearances and goals

Everton Santos da Costa (born January 6, 1986), or simply Everton Costa, is a Brazilian former professional footballer who played as a forward.
