= Nnadozie Ugonna Ezenwaka =

Nigerian footballer

Personal information
- Full name: Nnadozie Ugonna Ezenwaka
- Date of birth: June 16, 1994 (age 32)
- Place of birth: Nigeria
- Height: 5 ft 10 in (1.78 m)
- Position: Midfielder

Youth career
- Ocean Boys
- 2012–2013: Maccabi Netanya

Senior career*
Years	Team	Apps	(Gls)
2012	Ocean Boys		
2012–2013	Maccabi Netanya	0	(0)

International career
2012	Nigeria U-20	4	(0)
- * Club domestic league appearances and goals

Nnadozie Ugonna Ezenwaka (born June 16, 1994) is a Nigerian footballer.
