= 2013 Associação Portuguesa de Desportos season =

Portuguesa
2013 season
- President: Manuel da Lupa
- Coach: Edson Pimenta (until 29 July); Guto Ferreira (since 29 July)
- Stadium: Canindé
- Campeonato Brasileiro: 12th
- Campeonato Paulista Série A2: Champions
- Copa do Brasil: First round
- Copa Sudamericana: First round
Home colours	Away colours

The 2013 season was Associação Portuguesa de Desportos' ninety second season in existence and the club's second consecutive season in the top flight of Brazilian football.

== Players ==
=== Squad information ===
Note: Flags indicate national team as defined under FIFA eligibility rules; some limited exceptions apply. Players may hold more than one non-FIFA nationality.

No.	Pos.	Nation	Player
—	GK	BRA	Glédson
—	GK	BRA	Lauro (on loan from Internacional)
—	DF	BRA	Diego Augusto
—	DF	BRA	Rogério
—	DF	BRA	Valdomiro (Captain)
—	DF	BRA	Lima
—	DF	BRA	Moisés Moura
—	DF	BRA	Lucas Silva
—	DF	BRA	Luis Ricardo
—	DF	BRA	Ivan
—	DF	BRA	Magal
—	DF	BRA	Lacerda
—	DF	BRA	Bryan (on loan from América-MG)
—	MF	BRA	Bruninho
—	MF	BRA	Moisés
—	MF	BRA	Ferdinando
—	MF	BRA	Corrêa
—	MF	BRA	Carlos Alberto (on loan from Atlético Paranaense)
—	MF	BRA	Wanderson

No.	Pos.	Nation	Player
—	MF	BRA	Muralha (on loan from Flamengo)
—	MF	BRA	Jean Mota
—	MF	BRA	Henrique
—	MF	BRA	Héverton
—	MF	BRA	Souza (on loan from Cruzeiro)
—	MF	BRA	Matheus
—	MF	BRA	Douglas Washington
—	MF	ARG	Marcelo Cañete (on loan from São Paulo)
—	MF	BRA	Bruno Henrique (on loan from Londrina)
—	MF	BRA	Willian Arão (on loan from Corinthians)
—	FW	BRA	Diego Viana
—	FW	BRA	Diogo
—	FW	BRA	Romão
—	FW	BRA	Bruno Moraes
—	FW	BRA	Gilberto (on loan from Internacional)
—	FW	BRA	Neílson (on loan from Londrina)
—	FW	BRA	Bergson (on loan from Grêmio)
—	FW	BRA	Henrique (on loan from Mirassol)

==== Youth squad ====
Note: Flags indicate national team as defined under FIFA eligibility rules; some limited exceptions apply. Players may hold more than one non-FIFA nationality.

No.	Pos.	Nation	Player
—	GK	BRA	Tom
—	GK	BRA	Douglas Lima
—	DF	BRA	Alê
—	DF	BRA	Cassius
—	MF	BRA	Gabriel
—	MF	BRA	Gustavo
—	MF	BRA	Dejair

No.	Pos.	Nation	Player
—	MF	BRA	Aurélio
—	MF	BRA	Renan
—	FW	BRA	Marcelinho
—	FW	BRA	Lucas Iago
—	FW	BRA	Michel
—	FW	BRA	Luan

=== Appearances and goals ===
As of 8 December 2013

No.	Pos	Nat	Player	Total		Brasileirão		Copa do Brasil		Paulistão A2		Copa Sudamericana	
No.	Pos	Nat	Player	Apps	Goals	Apps	Goals	Apps	Goals	Apps	Goals	Apps	Goals
	GK	(Brazil) BRA	Tom	3	0	0	0	1	0	2	0	0	0
	GK	(Brazil) BRA	Glédson	34	0	6	0	1	0	25	0	2	0
	GK	(Brazil) BRA	Douglas Lima	0	0	0	0	0	0	0	0	0	0
	GK	(Brazil) BRA	Lauro	32	1	32	1	0	0	0	0	0	0
	DF	(Brazil) BRA	Rogério	38	0	32	0	1	0	5	0	0	0
	DF	(Brazil) BRA	Valdomiro	62	4	36	1	1	0	25	3	0	0
	DF	(Brazil) BRA	Lima	33	0	16+1	0	1	0	12+1	0	2	0
	DF	(Brazil) BRA	Moisés Moura	35	2	22	2	0	0	13	0	0	0
	DF	(Brazil) BRA	Lucas Silva	17	0	0+2	0	2	0	8+5	0	0	0
	DF	(Brazil) BRA	Luis Ricardo	57	7	33	4	1	0	23	3	0	0
	DF	(Brazil) BRA	Ivan	19	1	3	0	1	0	7+7	1	1	0
	DF	(Brazil) BRA	Alê	2	0	0	0	1	0	0+1	0	0	0
	DF	(Brazil) BRA	Diego Augusto	9	1	1+1	0	1	0	3+1	1	2	0
	DF	(Brazil) BRA	Cassius	0	0	0	0	0	0	0	0	0	0
	DF	(Brazil) BRA	Magal	2	0	0	0	0	0	0	0	2	0
	DF	(Brazil) BRA	Lacerda	0	0	0	0	0	0	0	0	0	0
	DF	(Brazil) BRA	Bryan	4	0	4	0	0	0	0	0	0	0
	MF	(Brazil) BRA	Bruninho	23	0	3+6	0	1	0	4+9	0	0	0
	MF	(Brazil) BRA	Moisés	53	4	27+4	2	1	0	17+4	2	0	0
	MF	(Brazil) BRA	Ferdinando	43	1	22+1	0	2	0	17+1	1	0	0
	MF	(Brazil) BRA	Corrêa	58	2	19+11	1	1	0	25	1	2	0
	MF	(Brazil) BRA	Muralha	13	0	0+1	0	1	0	8+3	0	0	0
	MF	(Brazil) BRA	Jean Mota	23	0	3+10	0	0+1	0	1+6	0	2	0
	MF	(Brazil) BRA	Henrique	18	0	0+4	0	1	0	10+3	0	0	0
	MF	(Brazil) BRA	Héverton	31	2	0+6	1	0+1	0	12+11	1	0+1	0
	MF	(Brazil) BRA	Souza	51	4	32	1	0	0	19	3	0	0
	MF	(Brazil) BRA	Matheus	17	3	7+3	0	1	0	3+3	3	0	0
	MF	(Brazil) BRA	Dejair	1	0	0	0	0	0	0+1	0	0	0
	MF	(Brazil) BRA	Douglas Washington	0	0	0	0	0	0	0	0	0	0
	MF	(Argentina) ARG	Marcelo Cañete	18	2	12+5	2	0	0	0	0	1	0
	MF	(Brazil) BRA	Bruno Henrique	29	4	29	4	0	0	0	0	0	0
	MF	(Brazil) BRA	Gabriel	1	0	0	0	0	0	0	0	0+1	0
	MF	(Brazil) BRA	Renan	2	0	0	0	0	0	0	0	2	0
	MF	(Brazil) BRA	Gustavo	1	0	1	0	0	0	0	0	0	0
	MF	(Brazil) BRA	Aurélio	1	0	0	0	0	0	0	0	0+1	0
	MF	(Brazil) BRA	Willian Arão	15	0	11+2	0	0	0	0	0	2	0
	MF	(Brazil) BRA	Carlos Alberto	6	1	0+4	0	0	0	0	0	2	1
	MF	(Brazil) BRA	Wanderson	16	3	4+12	3	0	0	0	0	0	0
	FW	(Brazil) BRA	Diego Viana	16	10	0	0	0+1	0	12+3	10	0	0
	FW	(Brazil) BRA	Michel	13	2	1+5	1	0+1	0	4+2	1	0	0
	FW	(Brazil) BRA	Luan	4	0	0	0	0	0	1+3	0	0	0
	FW	(Brazil) BRA	Diogo	22	4	19+1	4	2	0	0	0	0	0
	FW	(Brazil) BRA	Lucas Iago	2	0	0	0	0	0	0+2	0	0	0
	FW	(Brazil) BRA	Marcelinho	2	0	1	0	0+1	0	0	0	0	0
	FW	(Brazil) BRA	Romão	3	1	1+2	1	0	0	0	0	0	0
	FW	(Brazil) BRA	Bruno Moraes	9	2	4+3	2	0	0	0	0	0+2	0
	FW	(Brazil) BRA	Gilberto	24	14	24	14	0	0	0	0	0	0
	FW	(Brazil) BRA	Neílson	8	0	0+6	0	0	0	0	0	0+2	0
	FW	(Brazil) BRA	Bergson	16	2	8+7	2	0	0	0	0	0+1	0
	FW	(Brazil) BRA	Henrique	15	3	5+10	3	0	0	0	0	0	0
Players who have left the club after the start of the season:
	DF	(Brazil) BRA	Marcelo Cordeiro	20	2	0	0	0	0	20	2	0	0
	MF	(Brazil) BRA	Michael	0	0	0	0	0	0	0	0	0	0
	MF	(Brazil) BRA	Rafael Chorão	11	1	0	0	2	0	4+5	1	0	0
	FW	(Brazil) BRA	Kempes	2	0	0	0	0	0	2	0	0	0
	FW	(Argentina) ARG	Flecha Arraya	16	9	0+1	0	1	1	10+4	8	0	0
	FW	(Chile) CHI	Juan Manuel Lucero	8	1	0	0	0+2	0	5+1	1	0	0

==== Goalscorers ====
R	Name	Brasileirão	Copa do Brasil	Paulistão A2	Sudamericana	Total
1	(Brazil) Gilberto	14	0	0	0	14
2	(Brazil) Diego Viana	0	0	10	0	10
3	(Argentina) Flecha Arraya	0	1	8	0	9
4	(Brazil) Luis Ricardo	4	0	3	0	7
5	(Brazil) Bruno Henrique	4	0	0	0	4
5	(Brazil) Diogo	4	0	0	0	4
5	(Brazil) Moisés	2	0	2	0	4
5	(Brazil) Souza	1	0	3	0	4
5	(Brazil) Valdomiro	1	0	3	0	4
6	(Brazil) Henrique	3	0	0	0	3
6	(Brazil) Matheus	0	0	3	0	3
6	(Brazil) Wanderson	3	0	0	0	3
7	(Brazil) Bergson	2	0	0	0	2
7	(Brazil) Bruno Moraes	2	0	0	0	2
7	(Argentina) Cañete	2	0	0	0	2
7	(Brazil) Corrêa	1	0	1	0	2
7	(Brazil) Héverton	1	0	1	0	2
7	(Brazil) Marcelo Cordeiro	0	0	2	0	2
7	(Brazil) Michel	1	0	1	0	2
7	(Brazil) Moisés Moura	2	0	0	0	2
8	(Brazil) Carlos Alberto	0	0	0	1	1
8	(Brazil) Diego	0	0	1	0	1
8	(Brazil) Ferdinando	0	0	1	0	1
8	(Brazil) Ivan	0	0	1	0	1
8	(Brazil) Lauro	1	0	0	0	1
8	(Chile) Lucero	0	0	1	0	1
8	(Brazil) Rafael Chorão	0	0	1	0	1
8	(Brazil) Romão	1	0	0	0	1
	Own Goals	1	0	0	0	1
Total		50	1	43	1	95

Last updated: 17 November 2013
Source: Match reports in Competitive matches

=== Transfers ===
==== In ====
Note: Flags indicate national team as defined under FIFA eligibility rules; some limited exceptions apply. Players may hold more than one non-FIFA nationality.

No.	Pos.	Nation	Player
—	MF	BRA	Rafael Chorão (from Grêmio Barueri)
—	MF	BRA	Corrêa (from Palmeiras)
—	DF	BRA	Moisés Moura (from Shanghai Shenhua)
—	MF	BRA	Henrique (loan return from Atlético-PR)
—	MF	BRA	Willamis de Souza Silva (loan from Cruzeiro)
—	FW	ARG	Flecha Arraya (from Técnico Universitario)
—	FW	CHI	Juan Manuel Lucero (loan from Cerro Porteño)
—	MF	BRA	Muralha (loan from Flamengo)
—	MF	BRA	Matheus (from Daegu)
—	FW	BRA	Diogo (from Olympiacos)
—	GK	BRA	Lauro (loan from Internacional)
—	FW	BRA	Romão (from Capivariano)
—	MF	BRA	Douglas Washington (from São Luiz-RS)
—	MF	ARG	Marcelo Cañete (loan from São Paulo)
—	FW	BRA	Gilberto (loan from Internacional)
—	MF	BRA	Bruno Henrique (from Londrina)
—	FW	BRA	Bruno Moraes (from Taubaté)
—	FW	BRA	Neílson (from Londrina)
—	MF	BRA	Willian Arão (loan from Corinthians)
—	DF	BRA	Magal
—	MF	BRA	Carlos Alberto (loan from Atlético-PR)
—	FW	BRA	Bergson (loan from Grêmio)
—	DF	BRA	Lacerda (from Goiás)
—	MF	BRA	Wanderson (from Oeste)
—	FW	BRA	Henrique (from Santos)
—	DF	BRA	Bryan (loan from América-MG)

==== Out ====
Note: Flags indicate national team as defined under FIFA eligibility rules; some limited exceptions apply. Players may hold more than one non-FIFA nationality.

No.	Pos.	Nation	Player
—	FW	BRA	Kempes (to JEF United)
—	DF	BRA	Marcelo Cordeiro (to Sport)
—	MF	BRA	Rafael Chorão (to Treze)
—	FW	ARG	Flecha Arraya (to (Argentina) Huracán)
—	FW	CHI	Juan Manuel Lucero (to (Argentina) Quilmes)

== Competitions ==
=== Campeonato Brasileiro ===
==== Results summary ====
Overall								Home						Away					
Pld	W	D	L	GF	GA	GD	Pts	W	D	L	GF	GA	GD	W	D	L	GF	GA	GD
38	12	12	14	50	46	+4	48	9	7	3	32	17	+15	3	5	11	18	29	−11

Last updated: 16 October 2013.
Source: Soccerway

==== Results by round ====
Round	1	2	3	4	5	6	7	8	9	10	11	12	13	14	15	16	17	18	19	20	21	22	23	24	25	26	27	28	29	30	31	32	33	34	35	36	37	38
Ground	A	H	A	H	A	H	A	A	H	H	A	A	H	A	H	A	H	H	A	H	A	H	A	H	A	H	H	A	A	H	H	A	H	A	H	A	A	H
Result	L	W	D	D	D	D	L	L	L	D	L	D	W	D	L	L	W	W	L	W	L	W	W	W	L	W	L	L	W	D	D	L	D	D	W	L	W	D
Position	16	19	18	17	11	11	18	18	18	18	18	19	18	19	19	19	18	17	17	17	18	16	14	12	14	10	13	14	11	13	14	14	14	13	13	14	13	12

Updated to match(es) played on 20 October 2013. Source: Soccerway
A = Away; H = Home; W = Win; D = Draw; L = Loss

==== League table ====
Pos	Team	Pld	W	D	L	GF	GA	GD	Pts	Qualification or relegation
15	Fluminense	38	12	10	16	43	47	−4	46	
16	Flamengo	38	12	13	13	43	46	−3	45 (Note: Flamengo and Portuguesa were punished for selecting suspended players in Round 38. Each club lost 4 points.)	2014 Copa Libertadores Second Stage (Note: Atlético Mineiro is qualified for the second stage of the 2014 Copa Libertadores as the 2013 Copa Libertadores champion. Flamengo is qualified for the second stage of the 2014 Copa Libertadores as the 2013 Copa do Brasil champion.)
17	Portuguesa (R)	38	12	12	14	50	46	+4	44	Relegation to Série B
18	Vasco da Gama (R)	38	11	11	16	50	61	−11	44	Relegation to Série B
19	Ponte Preta (R)	38	9	10	19	37	55	−18	37	Relegation to Série B

Updated to match(es) played on unknown. Source: Soccerway.com
Rules for classification: 1st points; 2nd wins; 3rd goal difference; 4th goals scored; 5th head-to-head results; 6th least red cards received; 7th least yellow cards received; 8th draw.
(R) Relegated

==== Matches ====
25 May 1	Vasco da Gama	1 – 0	Portuguesa	Rio de Janeiro
18:30 UTC-03:00	Tenorio 47'; Yotún (yellow card) 29'; Luan (yellow card) 86'	Report	(yellow card) 24' (yellow-red card) 78' Diogo	Stadium: São Januário; Referee: Elmo Alves Resende Cunha (GO)

2 June 3	Náutico	2 – 2	Portuguesa	Recife
18:30 UTC-03:00	Rogério 16' (yellow card) 52'; Bruno Collaço (yellow card) 45'; Auremir (yellow card) 61'; Marcos Vinícius 90+3'	Report	32' Michel; (yellow card) 45+1' Ferdinando; (yellow card) 48' Lima; 82' Romão	Stadium: Aflitos; Attendance: 15,013; Referee: Dewson Fernando Freitas da Silva (PA)

5 June 4	Portuguesa	1 – 1	Internacional	São Paulo
19:30 UTC-03:00	Cañete 55'; Rogério (yellow card) 62'; Ferdinando (red card) 68'; Luis Ricardo (yellow card) 90'	Report	25' Rafael Moura; (yellow card) 42' Fabrício; (yellow card) 51' Gabriel; (yellow card) 62' D'Alessandro; (yellow card) 90' Juan	Stadium: Canindé; Attendance: 2,235; Referee: Wagner Reway (MT)

8 June 5	Corinthians	0 – 0	Portuguesa	São Paulo
18:30 UTC-03:00		Report	(yellow card) 44' Bruninho; (yellow card) 59' Cañete; (yellow card) 82' Diogo; (yellow card) 90+3' Rogério	Stadium: Pacaembu; Attendance: 30,785; Referee: Flávio Rodrigues Guerra (SP)

12 June 2	Portuguesa	2 – 1	Fluminense	São Paulo
19:30 UTC-03:00	Souza 23'; Bruninho (yellow card) 53'; Rogério (yellow card) 57'; Diogo (yellow card) 65' (goal) 83'; Valdomiro (yellow card) 81'	Report	37' Rafael Sóbis; (yellow card) 39' Edinho; (yellow card) 85' Gum	Stadium: Canindé; Attendance: 1,182; Referee: Emerson de Almeida Ferreira (MG)

6 July 6	Portuguesa	1 – 1	Cruzeiro	São Paulo
21:00 UTC-03:00	Valdomiro 5' (yellow card) 90+1'; Souza (yellow card) 20'; Ferdinando (yellow card) 63'	Report	(yellow card) 12' Luan; 17' Bruno Rodrigo; (yellow card) 43' Everton Ribeiro	Stadium: Canindé; Attendance: 2,769; Referee: Paulo Henrique de Godoy Bezerra

13 July 7	Santos	4 – 1	Portuguesa	Santos
18:30 UTC-03:00	Neílton 1', 75'; Willian José 10'; Galhardo (yellow card) 68'; Giva 90+2'	Report	(yellow card) 61' Ferdinando; 87' Bruno Moraes	Stadium: Vila Belmiro; Attendance: 5,860; Referee: Rodrigo Guarizo Ferreira do Amaral (SP)

21 July 8	Goiás	2 – 1	Portuguesa	Goiânia
18:30 UTC-03:00	Renan Oliveira 45', 66'; Amaral (yellow card) 58'; Hugo (red card) 86'; Walter (yellow card) 90+3'	Report	40' Bruno Moraes; (yellow card) 50' Corrêa	Stadium: Serra Dourada; Attendance: 4,853; Referee: Péricles Bassols Pegado Cortez (RJ)

27 July 9	Portuguesa	2 – 3	Atlético Paranaense	São Paulo
18:30 UTC-03:00	Moisés Moura 12'; Gilberto 22' (pen.); Souza (yellow card) 44' (yellow-red card) 51'; Rogério (yellow card) 68'	Report	8' (yellow card) 22' Manoel; 64' (yellow card) 64' Dellatorre; (yellow card) 77' Luiz Alberto; 90+2' Léo Pereira; (yellow card) 90+2' Elias	Stadium: Canindé; Attendance: 1,458; Referee: Fabricio Neves Correa

31 July 10	Portuguesa	1 – 1	Criciúma	São Paulo
19:30 UTC-03:00	Cañete (yellow card) 38'; Bruno Henrique 68'	Report	(yellow card) 33' Leandro Brasília; (yellow card) 37' Amaral; (yellow card) 80' Gilson; 90+3' Elton	Stadium: Canindé; Attendance: 1,244; Referee: Grazianni Maciel Rocha

4 August 11	Vitória	2 – 1	Portuguesa	Salvador
18:30 UTC-03:00	Daniel Borges (yellow card) 33'; Danilo Tarracha 71'; Fabrício 86'	Report	(yellow card) 13' Ferdinando; 63' Cañete; (yellow card) 75' Gilberto; (yellow card) 85' Luis Ricardo	Stadium: Barradão; Attendance: 7,697; Referee: Márcio Chagas da Silva

7 August 12	Flamengo	1 – 1	Portuguesa	Brasília
21:00 UTC-03:00	Cáceres (yellow card) 60'; João Paulo 68'	Report	(yellow card) 19' Gilberto; (yellow card) 47' Rogério; (yellow card) 49' Bruno Henrique; (yellow card) 66' (red card) 87' Ferdinando; 90+3' Lauro	Stadium: Mané Garrincha; Attendance: 12,511; Referee: Cleisson Veloso Pereira

11 August 13	Portuguesa	2 – 1	São Paulo	São Paulo
18:30 UTC-03:00	Rogério (yellow card) 20'; Diogo 38', 79'	Report	(yellow card) 8' Douglas; 46' Lucas Evangelista; (yellow card) 88' Aloísio	Stadium: Canindé; Attendance: 8,593; Referee: Rodrigo Nunes de Sá

14 August 14	Coritiba	1 – 1	Portuguesa	Curitiba
21:00 UTC-03:00	Zé Rafael (yellow card) 39'; Gil (yellow card) 63'; Bill (yellow card) 79' (goal) 90+5'	Report	(yellow card) 34' Cañete; (yellow card) 38' Diogo; (yellow card) 43' (yellow-red card) 45' Moisés Moura; 59' (yellow card) 90' Gilberto; (yellow card) 85' Lauro	Stadium: Couto Pereira; Attendance: 10,272; Referee: Arilson Bispo da Anunciação

18 August 15	Portuguesa	1 – 3	Botafogo	São Paulo
16:00 UTC-03:00	Rogério (yellow card) 45'; Gustavo (yellow card) 47'; Lauro (yellow card) 53'; Luis Ricardo 71'; Michel (yellow card) 88'	Report	(yellow card) 45+2' Jefferson; (yellow card) 58' Gilberto; (yellow card) 61' Júlio César; 66' Bolívar; 72' Rafael Marques; 77' Elias	Stadium: Canindé; Attendance: 4,276; Referee: Alício Pena Júnior

25 August 16	Atlético Mineiro	2 – 1	Portuguesa	Belo Horizonte
16:00 UTC-03:00	Réver (yellow card) 42'; Diego Tardelli 55'; Luan (yellow card) 58'; Leonardo Silva (yellow card) 78'; Júnior César (yellow card) 82'; Dátolo 89'	Report	36' (yellow card) 86' Bruno Henrique; (yellow card) 42' Gilberto	Stadium: Independência; Attendance: 8,555; Referee: Leandro Vuaden

31 August 17	Portuguesa	4 – 2	Bahia	São Paulo
18:30 UTC-03:00	Moisés Moura 2'; Gilberto 5' (pen.), 7'; Ferdinando (yellow card) 55'; Bergson 60'	Report	56' (pen.) Fernandão; (yellow card) 65' Raul; 73' Wallyson	Stadium: Canindé; Attendance: 2,466; Referee: Héber Roberto Lopes

4 September 18	Portuguesa	2 – 1	Ponte Preta	São Paulo
21:00 UTC-03:00	Souza (yellow card) 36'; Gilberto 41' (pen.), 49'	Report	(yellow card) 35' Chiquinho; (yellow card) 40' Fernando Bob; (yellow card) 90' (goal) 90+4' Adrianinho	Stadium: Canindé; Attendance: 1,419; Referee: Leandro Bizzio Marinho

7 September 19	Grêmio	3 – 2	Portuguesa	Porto Alegre
21:00 UTC-03:00	Barcos 52' (yellow card) 56'; Zé Roberto 58'; Kléber 87' (pen.)	Report	(yellow card) 11' Diogo; (yellow card) 38' Bruno Henrique; 70' (o.g.) Rhodolfo; 78' Luis Ricardo; (yellow card) 81' Rogério; (yellow card) 83' (yellow-red card) 84' Bruninho; (red card) 85' Valdomiro	Stadium: Arena do Grêmio; Referee: Jailson Macêdo Freitas

11 September 20	Portuguesa	2 – 0	Vasco da Gama	São Paulo
21:50 UTC-03:00	Corrêa 12'; Matheus (yellow card) 25'; Souza (yellow card) 53'; Diogo (yellow card) 69'; Gilberto 76'	Report	(yellow card) 72' Abuda	Stadium: Canindé; Attendance: 4,207; Referee: Cláudio Francisco Lima e Silva

14 September 21	Fluminense	2 – 1	Portuguesa	Rio de Janeiro
21:00 UTC-03:00	Bruno (yellow card) 51'; Rafael Sóbis 60' (pen.); Biro Biro (yellow card) 70'; Wágner 72'	Report	(yellow card) 29' Bruno Henrique; 34' (yellow card) 45+1' Diogo; (yellow card) 45+1' Rogério; (yellow card) 59' Moisés Moura; (yellow card) 76' Ferdinando	Stadium: Maracanã; Referee: Wilton Pereira Sampaio

19 September 22	Portuguesa	3 – 0	Náutico	São Paulo
21:00 UTC-03:00	Moisés 8'; Gilberto 35'; Bruno Henrique 41'	Report	(yellow card) 40' Jean Rolt; (yellow card) 70' Leandro Amaro; (yellow card) 78' Derley	Stadium: Canindé; Attendance: 1,808; Referee: Ricardo Marques Ribeiro

22 September 23	Internacional	0 – 1	Portuguesa	Novo Hamburgo
16:00 UTC-03:00	Airton (yellow card) 18'; Índio (yellow card) 31' (red card) 49'; Juan (yellow card) 42'; Caio (yellow card) 43'; D'Alessandro (yellow card) 71'	Report	(yellow card) 19' Moisés Moura; (yellow card) 31' Henrique; (yellow card) 75' Ferdinando; (yellow card) 82' Luis Ricardo; 86' Wanderson	Stadium: Estádio do Vale; Attendance: 3,012; Referee: Marcos André Gomes da Penha

29 September 24	Portuguesa	4 – 0	Corinthians	Campo Grande
16:00 UTC-03:00	Gilberto 8', 13', 32'; Wanderson 80'	Report	(yellow card) 38' Paulo André; (red card) 66' Gil	Stadium: Morenão; Attendance: 12,316; Referee: Raphael Claus

2 October 25	Cruzeiro	4 – 0	Portuguesa	Belo Horizonte
19:30 UTC-03:00	Everton Ribeiro 6'; Borges 16', 30' (yellow card) 39'; Willian 28'; Dedé (yellow card) 88'; Egídio (yellow card) 90'	Report	(yellow card) 55' Souza	Stadium: Mineirão; Attendance: 32,016; Referee: Jean Pierre Gonçalves Lima

6 October 26	Portuguesa	3 – 0	Santos	São Paulo
18:30 UTC-03:00	Luis Ricardo 15'; Rogério (yellow card) 27'; Bergson (yellow card) 45'; Gilberto 59', 66' (pen.)	Report	(yellow card) 66' Vladimir; (yellow card) 89' Mena	Stadium: Canindé; Attendance: 7,979; Referee: Péricles Bassols Cortez (RJ)

10 October 27	Portuguesa	1 – 2	Goiás	São Paulo
19:30 UTC-03:00	Héverton 83'; Gilberto (yellow card) 85'	Report	(yellow card) 14' Amaral; 37' Hugo; (yellow card) 41' William Matheus; 52' (pen.) Walter; (yellow card) 73' David; (yellow card) 86' Renan	Stadium: Canindé; Attendance: 3,353; Referee: Rodrigo Batista Raposo

13 October 28	Atlético Paranaense	1 – 0	Portuguesa	Curitiba
18:30 UTC-03:00	Marcelo 2' (yellow card) 74'; Luiz Alberto (yellow card) 56'	Report	(yellow card) 15' Valdomiro; (yellow card) 61' Moisés	Stadium: Durival Britto; Referee: Dewson Fernando Freitas da Silva

16 October 29	Criciúma	1 – 3	Portuguesa	Criciúma
21:00 UTC-03:00	Fábio Ferreira (yellow card) 28'; Daniel Carvalho (yellow card) 67'; Matheus Ferraz 70'; Wellington Paulista (yellow card) 74'	Report	10' (yellow card) 63' Gilberto; 13' Bergson; (yellow card) 23' Rogério; (yellow card) 36' Willian Arão; (yellow card) 74' Luis Ricardo; 90+1' Henrique	Stadium: Heriberto Hülse; Attendance: 11,633; Referee: Cleisson Veloso Pereira

20 October 30	Portuguesa	1 – 1	Vitória	São Paulo
18:30 UTC-02:00	Moisés 62'; Willian Arão (yellow card) 66'; Moisés Moura (yellow card) 80'; Rogério (yellow card) 85'	Report	18' Cáceres; (yellow card) 57' Victor Ramos; (yellow card) 67' Luiz Gustavo	Stadium: Canindé; Attendance: 3,687; Referee: Edivaldo Elias da Silva

27 October 31	Portuguesa	0 – 0	Flamengo	Fortaleza
16:00 UTC-02:00	Lima (yellow card) 48'; Souza (yellow card) 71'; Bryan (yellow card) 75'; Héverton (yellow card) 90+2'	Report	(yellow card) 55' Luiz Antônio	Stadium: Castelão; Attendance: 21,967; Referee: Anderson Daronco

2 November 32	São Paulo	2 – 1	Portuguesa	São Paulo
19:30 UTC-02:00	Rodrigo Caio 8'; Aloísio 77'; Denílson (yellow card) 84'	Report	41' Luis Ricardo	Stadium: Morumbi; Attendance: 50,802; Referee: André Luiz de Freitas Castro

9 November 33	Portuguesa	0 – 0	Coritiba	São Paulo
19:30 UTC-02:00	Gilberto (yellow card) 66'; Rogério (yellow card) 71'	Report	(yellow card) 34' Vítor Júnior; (yellow card) 49' Junior Urso; (yellow card) 87' Diogo	Stadium: Canindé; Attendance: 3,781; Referee: Ricardo Marques Ribeiro

13 November 34	Botafogo	0 – 0	Portuguesa	Rio de Janeiro
21:00 UTC-02:00	Marcelo Mattos (yellow card) 14'	Report	(yellow card) 6' Luis Ricardo; (yellow card) 40' Diogo; (yellow card) 78' Valdomiro; (red card) 90+1' Gilberto	Stadium: Maracanã; Attendance: 7,654; Referee: Emerson de Almeida Ferreira

17 November 35	Portuguesa	2 – 0	Atlético Mineiro	São Paulo
19:30 UTC-02:00	Bruno Henrique 45'; Moisés (yellow card) 51'; Henrique 64'; Bruno Moraes (yellow card) 78'	Report	(yellow card) 28' Carlos César; (yellow card) 39' Emerson; (yellow card) 52' Lucas Cândido; (yellow card) 87' Neto Berola	Stadium: Canindé; Attendance: 2,867; Referee: Jean Pierre Gonçalves Lima

24 November 36	Bahia	1 – 0	Portuguesa	Salvador
19:30 UTC-02:00	Fernandão 44'; Feijão (yellow card) 3' (yellow-red card) 66'; Obina (yellow card) 85'; Marcelo Lomba (yellow card) 86'	Report	(yellow card) 27' Willian Arão; (red card) 45' Héverton; (yellow card) 90+2' Bruno Henrique	Stadium: Fonte Nova; Attendance: 31,025; Referee: Ricardo Marques Ribeiro

1 December 37	Ponte Preta	0 – 2	Portuguesa	Campinas
17:00 UTC-02:00	Chiquinho (yellow card) 57'; Betão (yellow card) 79'; Ferron (yellow card) 85'	Report	15' Henrique; (yellow card) 22' Bruno Henrique; 65' Wanderson; (yellow card) 80' Gilberto	Stadium: Moisés Lucarelli; Attendance: 2,390; Referee: Márcio Chagas da Silva

8 December 38	Portuguesa	0 – 0	Grêmio	São Paulo
17:00 UTC-02:00	Diogo (yellow card) 39'; Henrique (yellow card) 69'	Report	(yellow card) 39' Vargas	Stadium: Canindé; Attendance: 4,539; Referee: Emerson de Almeida Ferreira

=== Copa Sudamericana ===
==== Squad ====
Note: Flags indicate national team as defined under FIFA eligibility rules; some limited exceptions apply. Players may hold more than one non-FIFA nationality.

No.	Pos.	Nation	Player
1	GK	BRA	Lauro (on loan from Internacional)
2	DF	BRA	Luis Ricardo
3	DF	BRA	Lima
4	DF	BRA	Valdomiro (Captain)
5	MF	BRA	Ferdinando
6	DF	BRA	Rogério
7	FW	BRA	Diogo
8	MF	BRA	Bruno Henrique (on loan from Londrina)
9	FW	BRA	Gilberto (on loan from Internacional)
10	MF	BRA	Moisés
11	MF	ARG	Marcelo Cañete (on loan from São Paulo)
12	GK	BRA	Glédson
13	DF	BRA	Diego
14	DF	BRA	Gustavo
15	MF	BRA	Carlos Alberto (on loan from Atlético Paranaense)

No.	Pos.	Nation	Player
16	DF	BRA	Magal
17	MF	BRA	Willian Arão (on loan from Corinthians)
18	FW	BRA	Bergson (on loan from Grêmio)
19	FW	BRA	Bruno Moraes
20	MF	BRA	Héverton
21	MF	BRA	Corrêa
22	GK	BRA	Tom
23	DF	BRA	Alê
24	MF	BRA	Aurélio
25	MF	BRA	Jean Mota
26	DF	BRA	Cassius
27	DF	BRA	Ivan
28	FW	BRA	Neílson (on loan from Londrina)
29	MF	BRA	Gabriel
30	MF	BRA	Renan

==== First round ====
17 April 1st leg	Portuguesa	1 – 2	Bahia	São Paulo
21:50 UTC-03:00	Carlos Alberto 60'; Cañete (yellow card) 82'; Renan (yellow card) 90'	Report	41' Wallyson; (yellow card) 49' Talisca; (yellow card) 86' Lucas Fonseca; 90+1' Obina	Stadium: Canindé; Referee: Wilton Pereira Sampaio

28 August 2nd leg	Bahia	0 – 0 (2 – 1 agg.)	Portuguesa	Salvador
21:50 UTC-03:00	Demerson (yellow card) 56'; Angulo (yellow card) 62'	Report	(yellow card) 61' Lima	Stadium: Pituaçu; Referee: Péricles Bassols Pegado Cortez

=== Copa do Brasil ===
==== First round ====
4 April 1st leg	Naviraiense	0 – 0	Portuguesa	Naviraí
22:00 UTC-03:00	Everson Piki (yellow card) 20'; Joel (yellow card) 33'; Fabio (yellow card) 36'	Report	(yellow card) 19' Lucas; (yellow card) 20' Diogo; (yellow card) 42' Bruninho	Stadium: Virotão; Attendance: 962; Referee: Antonio Denival de Morais (PR)

17 April Replay	Portuguesa	1 – 1 (1 – 1 agg.)	Naviraiense	São Paulo
21:50 UTC-03:00	Arraya (yellow card) 27' (goal) 76'; Lima (yellow card) 33'; Lucas (yellow card) 51'; Valdomiro (yellow card) 66'; Michel (yellow card) 72'; Diogo (yellow card) 83'	Report	(yellow card) 8' Fábio; (yellow card) 19' Adriano; (yellow card) 58' Washington; 71' Paulo Sergio	Stadium: Canindé; Attendance: 881; Referee: Emerson de Almeida Ferreira (MG)

=== Campeonato Paulista Série A2 ===
==== Results summary ====
Overall								Home						Away					
Pld	W	D	L	GF	GA	GD	Pts	W	D	L	GF	GA	GD	W	D	L	GF	GA	GD
27	18	4	5	43	23	+20	58	12	1	1	27	4	+23	6	3	4	16	19	−3

Last updated: 23 May 2013.
Source: Soccerway

==== First stage ====
Pos	Team	Pld	W	D	L	GF	GA	GD	Pts
1	Audax São Paulo	19	14	3	2	41	18	+23	45
2	Portuguesa	19	12	4	3	31	11	+20	40
3	Comercial	19	8	8	3	26	11	+15	32

Updated to match(es) played on 23 May 2013. Source: Globo Esporte
Rules for classification: 1st points; 2nd head-to-head points; 3rd head-to-head goal difference; 4th head-to-head goals scored; 5th goal difference; 6th number of goals scored;

===== Matches =====
23 January 1	Monte Azul	1 – 0	Portuguesa	Monte Azul
16:00 UTC-02:00	Luiz Paulo 33'; Anderson (yellow card) 66'; Marcelo Godri (yellow card) 85'; José Fábio (yellow card) 90'	Report	(yellow card) 31' Ferdinando; (yellow card) 45' Henrique; (yellow card) 65' Valdomiro; (yellow card) 73' Michel	Stadium: AMA; Attendance: 672; Referee: Thiago Silva Egidio

27 January 2	Portuguesa	2 – 0	Santo André	São Paulo
10:00 UTC-02:00	Otávio 50' (o.g.); Rafael Chorão 66'	Report	(yellow card) 81' Juninho	Stadium: Canindé; Attendance: 1,261; Referee: Luis Carlos Ramos Júnior

30 January 3	Catanduvense	1 – 1	Portuguesa	Catanduva
20:00 UTC-02:00	Roberto Jacaré 9'; Fabrizzyo (red card) 82'; Wanderson (yellow card) 83'	Report	11' Michel; (yellow card) 64' Héverton; (red card) 82' Henrique; (yellow card) 83' Valdomiro	Stadium: Sílvio Salles; Attendance: 823; Referee: Norberto Luciano Santos da Silveira

2 February 4	Portuguesa	0 – 0	Comercial	São Paulo
16:00 UTC-02:00	Souza (red card) 66'	Report	(red card) 1' Alex Rafael; (yellow card) 28' (red card) 88' Acleisson; (yellow card) 65' Thiago Silva	Stadium: Canindé; Attendance: 1,482; Referee: Guilherme Ceretta de Lima

6 February 5	Portuguesa	4 – 0	Grêmio Osasco	São Paulo
20:30 UTC-02:00	Moisés 36'; Diego Viana 41' 71'; Héverton (yellow card) 43'; Marcelo Cordeiro 61'	Report	(yellow card) 1' Alê; (yellow card) 39' Rodrigo Pontes; (yellow card) 40' Willian	Stadium: Canindé; Attendance: 1,482; Referee: Guilherme Ceretta de Lima

9 February 6	Ferroviária	0 – 0	Portuguesa	Araraquara
17:00 UTC-02:00		Report	(yellow card) 22' Ferdinando; (yellow card) 59' Marcelo Cordeiro	Stadium: Fonte Luminosa; Attendance: 1,161; Referee: Fábio de Jesus Volpato Mendes

13 February 7	São José	0 – 2	Portuguesa	São José dos Campos
20:30 UTC-02:00	Leandrinho (red card) 52'; Gláuber (yellow card) 61'	Report	19' (yellow card) 56' Diego Viana; 35' Luis Ricardo; (yellow card) 52' Corrêa; (yellow card) 80' Ferdinando	Stadium: Martins Pereira; Attendance: 3,519; Referee: Vinicius Gonçalves Dias Araujo

17 February 8	Portuguesa	2 – 1	Juventus	São Paulo
16:00 UTC-02:00	Lucas (yellow card) 25'; Diego Viana 44' 85'	Report	(yellow card) 81' Fabio Vinicius; (yellow card) 82' (goal) 88' Elvis	Stadium: Canindé; Attendance: 2,842; Referee: André Luís Riquena

20 February 9	Grêmio Barueri	1 – 2	Portuguesa	Barueri
16:00 UTC-02:00	Willian (yellow card) 14' (goal) 53'; Léo Coelho (yellow card) 34'; Thiago Brito (yellow card) 57'	Report	72' Diego Viana; (yellow card) 85' Moisés Moura; 90+2' Souza	Stadium: Arena Barueri; Attendance: 486; Referee: Marcelo Prieto Alfieri

24 February 10	Portuguesa	3 – 0	Rio Claro	São Paulo
16:00 UTC-02:00	Glédson (yellow card) 25'; Souza 25'; Luis Ricardo 39'; Diego Viana 47'	Report		Stadium: Canindé; Attendance: 1,926; Referee: Antonio Rogério Batista do Prado

27 February 11	Red Bull Brasil	1 – 0	Portuguesa	Campinas
19:00 UTC-02:00	Jheckson Silva (yellow card) 21'; Henan 34'; Jefferson Luis (yellow card) 42'	Report	(yellow card) 24' Souza; (yellow card) 76' Lucas Iago; (yellow card) 77' Lucas	Stadium: Moisés Lucarelli; Attendance: 339; Referee: Welton Orlando Wohnrath

3 March 12	Portuguesa	2 – 1	Capivariano	São Paulo
16:00 UTC-02:00	Lucero (yellow card) 29' (goal) 34'; Luis Ricardo (yellow card) 44'; Marcelo Cordeiro (yellow card) 75'; Valdomiro 84'; Héverton (yellow card) 84'	Report	20' Romão; (yellow card) 27' Silas; (yellow card) 67' Alemão	Stadium: Canindé; Attendance: 1,785; Referee: Rodrigo Braghetto

7 March 13	Portuguesa	3 – 0	Noroeste	São Paulo
20:30 UTC-02:00	Corrêa (yellow card) 33'; Marcelo Cordeiro 45'; Bruninho (yellow card) 56'; Arraya 64' 82'; Luis Ricardo (yellow card) 79'; Lima (yellow card) 90+4'	Report	(yellow card) 35' Deives Thiago; (yellow card) 41' Nathan; (yellow card) 85' Junior Maranhão	Stadium: Canindé; Attendance: 993; Referee: Leonardo Ferreira Lima

9 March 14	Audax São Paulo	3 – 2	Portuguesa	São Paulo
10:00 UTC-02:00	Clecildo Rafael 17' 77'; Thiago Martinelli (yellow card) 83'	Report	(yellow card) 38' Lima; (yellow card) 54' Luis Ricardo; 60' Arraya; (yellow card) 78' Valdomiro; 88' Souza	Stadium: Rua Javari; Attendance: 893; Referee: Adriano de Assis Miranda

14 March 15	Velo Clube	1 – 2	Portuguesa	Rio Claro
20:00 UTC-02:00	Ernando (yellow card) 30'; Serginho (yellow card) 56'; Luiz Henrique 72'; Davi (yellow card) 77'	Report	(yellow card) 41' Diego; (yellow card) 54' (goal) 59' Héverton; (yellow card) 61' Corrêa; (yellow card) 90+2' Souza; 90+2' Ivan	Stadium: Benitão; Attendance: 1,001; Referee: Marcelo Aparecido Ribeiro de Souza

17 March 16	Portuguesa	2 – 0	Rio Branco	São Paulo
10:00 UTC-02:00	Ferdinando 39'; Arraya 82'	Report	(yellow card) 22' Sandoval; (yellow card) 63' Julio; (yellow card) 73' Rafael Araújo; (yellow card) 74' Dias	Stadium: Canindé; Attendance: 1,231; Referee: Júnior César Lossávaro

21 March 17	Portuguesa	2 – 0	Guaratinguetá	São Paulo
20:30 UTC-02:00	Valdomiro 16'; Moisés 20'; Lima (red card) 46'; Marcelo Cordeiro (yellow card) 48'; Jean Mota (yellow card) 49'; Souza (yellow card) 70'	Report	(yellow card) 63' Ruan	Stadium: Canindé; Attendance: 977; Referee: Marcelo Rogério

24 March 18	Santacruzense	1 – 1	Portuguesa	Santa Cruz do Rio Pardo
10:30 UTC-02:00	Diogo Aparecido (yellow card) 52'; Marcinho (yellow card) 57'; Braz (yellow card) 73'; Joseliton Menezes (yellow card) 83' (goal) 90+1'	Report	(yellow card) 17' Corrêa; 28' Diego; (yellow card) 70' Lucero; (yellow card) 81' Lucas; (yellow card) 83' Tom	Stadium: Leônidas Camarinha; Attendance: 660; Referee: Edson Reis Pavani Júnior

31 March 19	Portuguesa	1 – 0	São Carlos	São Paulo
10:00 UTC-02:00	Diego Viana 80'	Report	(yellow card) 90+1' Fernandinho	Stadium: Canindé; Attendance: 1,031; Referee: Camilo Morais Zarpelão

==== Second stage ====
Pos	Team	Pld	W	D	L	GF	GA	GD	Pts
1	Portuguesa	6	5	0	1	10	10	0	15
2	Comercial	6	2	1	3	10	5	+5	7
3	Capivariano	6	2	1	3	6	7	−1	7

Updated to match(es) played on 26 May 2013. Source: Globo Esporte
Rules for classification: 1st points; 2nd head-to-head points; 3rd head-to-head goal difference; 4th head-to-head goals scored; 5th goal difference; 6th number of goals scored;

===== Matches =====
6 April 1	Catanduvense	1 – 2	Portuguesa	Catanduva
10:00 UTC-02:00	Renato Aparecido 54'; Wanderson (yellow card) 61'; Everaldo Barbosa (yellow card) 62'	Report	56' (yellow card) 79' Valdomiro; (yellow card) 64' Moisés Moura; 76' Arraya	Stadium: Silvio Salles; Attendance: 1,061; Referee: Luiz Flávio de Oliveira

11 April 2	Portuguesa	1 – 0	Capivariano	São Paulo
20:30 UTC-02:00	Diego Viana 2'; Valdomiro (yellow card) 53'; Marcelo Cordeiro (yellow card) 80'	Report	(yellow card) 34' Georginho	Stadium: Canindé; Attendance: 1,595; Referee: Raphael Claus

14 April 3	Comercial	7 – 0	Portuguesa	Ribeirão Preto
19:00 UTC-02:00	Acleisson 14'; Magalhães (yellow card) 16'; Macena 20' 32' 62'; Mirita (yellow card) 26'; Leandro Oliveira 40' 51'; Paulo Ricardo 84'	Report	(yellow card) 18' Muralha; (yellow card) 25' Moisés Moura; (yellow card) 47' Luis Ricardo	Stadium: Palma Travassos; Attendance: 4,045; Referee: Luiz Vanderlei Martinucho

21 April 4	Portuguesa	1 – 0	Comercial	São Paulo
16:00 UTC-02:00	Luis Ricardo 75'; Lucas (yellow card) 89'	Report	(yellow card) 2' Rafael Goiano; (yellow card) 36' Paulo Ricardo	Stadium: Canindé; Attendance: 2,318; Referee: José Cláudio Rocha Filho

25 April 5	Capivariano	1 – 2	Portuguesa	Capivari
20:00 UTC-02:00	Kelisson Roberto (yellow card) 40'; Michel Fagner (yellow card) 45'; Romão 50' (yellow card) 80'; Dener Henrique (yellow card) 63'; Georginho (yellow card) 76'	Report	10' Diego Viana; (yellow card) 32' Glédson; (yellow card) 48' Lima; (yellow card) 83' Corrêa; 89' Matheus; (yellow card) 90+3' Valdomiro	Stadium: Carlos Conalghi; Attendance: 2,480; Referee: Aurélio Sant'anna Martins

28 April 6	Portuguesa	4 – 1	Catanduvense	São Paulo
10:00 UTC-02:00	Arraya 13' (pen.) 55' 86'; Muralha (yellow card) 30'; Matheus (yellow card) 60' (goal) 81'; Bruninho (yellow card) 70'; Tom (yellow card) 68'; Rogério (yellow card) 79'	Report	(yellow card) 13' Diogo Kachuba; (yellow card) 31' Samuel; (yellow card) 47' (goal) 80' Ermínio; (yellow card) 88' Wanderson	Stadium: Canindé; Attendance: 1,149; Referee: Marcio Henrique de Gois

==== Finals ====
5 May 1st leg	Rio Claro	1 – 2	Portuguesa	Rio Claro
10:00 UTC-03:00	Éder Araujo (yellow card) 64'; Alex Afonso 59' (pen.)	Report	Corrêa 39'; Matheus 73'; Souza (yellow card) 88'	Stadium: Schimidtão; Attendance: 2,044; Referee: Mauricio Antonio Fioretti

12 May 2nd leg	Portuguesa	0 – 1 (2 – 2 agg.)	Rio Claro	São Paulo
10:00 UTC-03:00	Matheus (yellow card) 55'; Souza (yellow card) 82'; Valdomiro (yellow card) 90'	Report	Givanildo (yellow card) 17'; Jocinei 51'; Nando Carandina (yellow card) 53'; Bilinha (yellow card) 75'; Rodrigo (yellow card) 85'; Gilberto Alemão (yellow card) 86'	Stadium: Canindé; Attendance: 5,250; Referee: Vinícius Furlan
