= 2013 Clube Náutico Capibaribe season =

Náutico
2013 season
- Chairman: Paulo Wanderley
- Manager: Alexandre Gallo; Vágner Mancini; Levi Gomes (c); Silas; Zé Teodoro; Jorginho; Marcelo Martelotte
- Stadium: Estádio dos Aflitos; Arena Pernambuco
- Série A: 20th
- Pernambucano: Semi-finals
- Copa Sudamericana: First round
- Copa do Brasil: First round
- Top goalscorer: League: Maikon Leite (8); All: Élton (17)
Home colours	Away colours	Third colours

The 2013 season was Náutico's 113th season in the club's history. Náutico competed in the Campeonato Pernambucano, Copa Sudamericana, Copa do Brasil and Série A.

== Squad ==
Note: Flags indicate national team as defined under FIFA eligibility rules; some limited exceptions apply. Players may hold more than one non-FIFA nationality.

No.	Pos.	Nation	Player
1	GK	BRA	Ricardo Berna
2	DF	BRA	Auremir
3	DF	BRA	Jean Rolt
4	DF	BRA	William Alves
5	MF	BRA	Elicarlos
6	DF	BRA	Eltinho
7	MF	BRA	Martinez
8	MF	BRA	Derley
9	FW	BRA	Rogério
10	MF	BRA	Tiago Real
11	FW	BRA	Maikon Leite
12	GK	BRA	Gideão
13	MF	BRA	Dadá
14	MF	BRA	Rodrigo Souto
15	MF	VEN	Angelo Peña

No.	Pos.	Nation	Player
16	MF	BRA	Marcos Vinícius
17	MF	BRA	Magrão
18	FW	BRA	Jones Carioca
19	FW	URU	Juan Manuel Olivera
20	FW	BRA	Jonatas Belusso
21	FW	BRA	Hugo Cabral
22	DF	BRA	Oziel
23	DF	BRA	Leandro Amaro
24	GK	BRA	Felipe Garcia
25	DF	BRA	Alison
26	DF	BRA	Luiz Eduardo
27	FW	BRA	João Paulo
28	DF	BRA	Bruno Collaço
29	MF	ARG	Diego Morales
30	DF	BRA	João Filipe

== Statistics ==
=== Overall ===
Games played	63 (21 Pernambucano, 2 Copa do Brasil, 2 Copa Sudamericana, 38 Série A)
Games won	20 (14 Pernambucano, 0 Copa do Brasil, 1 Copa Sudamericana, 5 Série A)
Games drawn	7 (1 Pernambucano, 1 Copa do Brasil, 0 Copa Sudamericana, 5 Série A)
Games lost	36 (6 Pernambucano, 1 Copa do Brasil, 1 Copa Sudamericana, 28 Série A)
Goals scored	77
Goals conceded	107
Goal difference	–30
Best results (goal difference)	8–0 (H) v Petrolina - Pernambucano - 2013.02.24
Worst result (goal difference)	1–6 (A) v Atlético Paranaense - Série A - 2013.11.24
Top scorer	Élton (17)

Source: Náutico official website

=== Goalscorers ===
Place	Position	Nationality	Number	Name	Campeonato Pernambucano	Copa do Brasil	Copa Sudamericana	Série A	Total
1	FW	(Brazil)	11	Élton	16	1	0	0	17
2	FW	(Brazil)	10	Rogério	12	0	0	3	15
3	MF	(Brazil)	11	Maikon Leite	0	0	0	8	8
4	MF	(Brazil)	27	João Paulo	4	0	0	0	4
5	FW	(Uruguay)	19	Juan Manuel Olivera	0	0	1	2	3
5	FW	(Brazil)	9	Kieza	3	0	0	0	3
5	MF	(Brazil)	16	Marcos Vinícius	2	0	0	1	3
6	MF	(Brazil)	8	Derley	0	0	0	2	2
6	MF	(Brazil)	8	Giovanni Augusto	2	0	0	0	2
6	FW	(Brazil)	21	Hugo Cabral	0	0	0	2	2
6	MF	(Brazil)		Marcos Paulo	2	0	0	0	2
6	FW	(Brazil)	9	Renato	2	0	0	0	2
6	MF	(Brazil)	10	Tiago Real	0	0	0	2	2
6	MF	(Brazil)	17	Vinícius Pacheco	2	0	0	0	2
7	DF	(Brazil)	3	Alcides	0	1	0	0	1
7	DF	(Brazil)	25	Alison	1	0	0	0	1
7	MF	(Brazil)	13	Auremir	0	0	0	1	1
7	FW	(Brazil)	18	Caion	0	0	0	1	1
7	DF	(Brazil)		Dennys	1	0	0	0	1
7	DF	(Brazil)	6	Douglas Santos	1	0	0	0	1
7	MF	(Brazil)	5	Elicarlos	0	0	1	0	1
7	FW	(Brazil)		Emerson	1	0	0	0	1
7	FW	(Brazil)		Geraldo	1	0	0	0	1
				Own goals	1	0	0	0	1
				Total	51	2	2	22	77

=== Home record ===
São Lourenço da Mata	Recife
Arena Pernambuco	Estádio dos Aflitos
Capacity: 44,300	Capacity: 19,800
19 matches (4 wins 3 draws 12 losses)	14 matches (8 wins 2 draws 4 losses)

== Friendlies ==
=== Inauguration of the Arena Pernambuco ===
22 May 2013	Náutico (Brazil)	1–1	(Portugal) Sporting	São Lourenço da Mata
20:00 (UTC-3)	Élton 82' (pen.)	Report	Luiz Eduardo 26' (o.g.)	Stadium: Estádio Governador Carlos Wilson Campos (Arena Pernambuco); Attendance: 26,903; Referee: Gilberto Castro Júnior

== Official Competitions ==
=== Campeonato Pernambucano ===
==== First stage ====
23 January 2013 1	Chã Grande	2–2	Náutico	Vitória de Santo Antão
20:00 (UTC-3)	Alan Rocha 32', 43'	Report	Geraldo 60'; João Paulo 64'	Stadium: Estádio Municipal Severino Cândido Carneiro (Carneirão); Attendance: 6,904; Referee: Neilson Santos

26 January 2013 2	Náutico	3–1	Ypiranga	Recife
18:30 (UTC-3)	João Paulo 12'; Dennys 47'; Marcos Vinícius	Report	João Paulo 71' (o.g.)	Stadium: Estádio Eládio de Barros Carvalho (Aflitos); Attendance: 6,345; Referee: Gleydson Leite

30 January 2013 3	Náutico	3–1	Pesqueira	Recife
20:00 (UTC-3)	João Paulo 46'; Renato 47'; Emerson 77'	Report	Jânio 34' (pen.)	Stadium: Estádio Eládio de Barros Carvalho (Aflitos); Referee: Giorgio Wilton

2 February 2013 4	Porto	0–3	Náutico	Caruaru
19:00 (UTC-3)		Report	Kieza 7', 66'; Rogério 32'	Stadium: Estádio Luiz José de Lacerda (Lacerdão); Attendance: 7,527; Referee: José Washington

6 February 2013 5	Náutico	2–1	Serra Talhada	Recife
20:00 (UTC-3)	Élton 19', 46'	Report	Alex Costa 40'	Stadium: Estádio Eládio de Barros Carvalho (Aflitos); Attendance: 7,917; Referee: Gilberto Castro Júnior

13 February 2013 6	Petrolina	0–1	Náutico	Petrolina
20:00 (UTC-3)		Report	Vinícius Pacheco 44'	Stadium: Estádio Municipal Paulo de Souza Coelho; Attendance: 4,308; Referee: Gilberto Castro Júnior

16 February 2013 7	Náutico	0–1	Central	Recife
19:00 (UTC-3)		Report	Tallys 51'	Stadium: Estádio Eládio de Barros Carvalho (Aflitos)

20 February 2013 8	Belo Jardim	2–3	Náutico	Belo Jardim
22:00 (UTC-3)	Douglas 67'; Fernandinho 74'	Report	Kieza; Marcos Paulo; Rogério	Stadium: Estádio José Bezerra de Mendonça; Attendance: 6,008; Referee: Sebastião Rufino Filho

==== Second stage ====
24 February 2013 1	Náutico	8–0	Petrolina	Recife
16:00 (UTC-3)	Élton 30', 39'; Rogério 56', 68', 71'; Jeffinho 73' (o.g.); Renato 84'; Giovanni Augusto 88'	Report		Stadium: Estádio Eládio de Barros Carvalho (Aflitos); Attendance: 7,697; Referee: Tiago Nascimento

27 February 2013 2	Pesqueira	3–2	Náutico	Garanhuns
20:00 (UTC-3)	Jânio, Dadá	Report	Élton; Rogério	Stadium: Estádio Marco Antônio Maciel (Gigante do Agreste); Referee: Gilberto Castro Júnior

2 March 2013 3	Náutico	5–3	Chã Grande	Recife
20:30 (UTC-3)	Élton,, Alison; Marcos Paulo	Report	Julian; Jaime; Danilo	Stadium: Estádio Eládio de Barros Carvalho (Aflitos); Attendance: 5,718; Referee: Emerson Sobral

6 March 2013 4	Salgueiro	0–4	Náutico	Salgueiro
21:50 (UTC-3)		Report	Élton 32', 81'; Rogério 33'; Giovanni Augusto 67'	Stadium: Estádio Cornélio de Barros; Attendance: 8,712; Referee: Neilson Santos

9 March 2013 5	Náutico	3–0	Belo Jardim	Recife
20:00 (UTC-3)	Rogério 7'; Élton 80', 81'	Report		Stadium: Estádio Eládio de Barros Carvalho (Aflitos); Attendance: 7,795; Referee: Wagner Cabral

13 March 2013 6	Náutico	3–0	Porto	Recife
20:00 (UTC-3)	Élton (pen.); Rogério,	Report		Stadium: Estádio Eládio de Barros Carvalho (Aflitos)

17 March 2013 7	Sport	2–1	Náutico	Recife
16:00 (UTC-3)	Hugo 32'; Felipe Azevedo 81'	Report	Rogério 18'	Stadium: Estádio Adelmar da Costa Carvalho (Ilha do Retiro); Attendance: 18,670; Referee: Sandro Meira Ricci

20 March 2013 8	Central	0–4	Náutico	Caruaru
22:00 (UTC-3)		Report	Marcos Vinícius; Vinícius Pacheco; Rogério; Élton	Stadium: Estádio Luiz José de Lacerda (Lacerdão); Attendance: 4,100; Referee: Gilberto Freire

31 March 2013 9	Náutico	0–2	Santa Cruz	Recife
16:00 (UTC-3)		Report	Natan 77'; Dênis Marques 79'	Stadium: Estádio Eládio de Barros Carvalho (Aflitos); Referee: Gleydson Leite

7 April 2013 10	Náutico	0–2	Ypiranga	Recife
16:00 (UTC-3)		Report	Danúbio 42'; Diogo 80'	Stadium: Estádio Eládio de Barros Carvalho (Aflitos); Attendance: 7,345; Referee: Arilson Bispo da Anunciação

14 April 2013 11	Serra Talhada	0–2	Náutico	Serra Talhada
16:00 (UTC-3)		Report	Douglas Santos; João Paulo	Stadium: Estádio Nildo Pereira de Menezes; Attendance: 4,311; Referee: Nielson Nogueira Dias

==== Semi-finals ====
21 April 2013	Santa Cruz	1–0	Náutico	Recife
16:00 (UTC-3)	Renatinho 51'	Report		Stadium: Estádio José do Rego Maciel (Arruda); Attendance: 28,275; Referee: Gleydson Leite

28 April 2013	Náutico	2–1	Santa Cruz	Recife
16:00 (UTC-3)	Élton 15', 84'	Report	Dênis Marques 78'	Stadium: Estádio Eládio de Barros Carvalho (Aflitos); Attendance: 15,013; Referee: Gilberto Castro Júnior

==== Record ====
Final Position	Points	Matches	Wins	Draws	Losses	Goals For	Goals Away	Avg%
3rd	43	21	14	1	6	51	22	68%

=== Copa do Brasil ===
==== First round ====
10 April 2013	CRAC	3–1	Náutico	Catalão
22:00 (UTC-3)	Pantico 21' (pen.), 45'; Danilo 79'	Report	Alcides 90+2'	Stadium: Estádio Genervino da Fonseca; Attendance: 2,237; Referee: Alinor Silva da Paixão

18 April 2013	Náutico	1–1	CRAC	Recife
20:30 (UTC-3)	Élton 86'	Report	Jonatan 29'	Stadium: Estádio Eládio de Barros Carvalho (Aflitos); Attendance: 3,026; Referee: Ítalo Medeiros de Azevedo

==== Record ====
Final Position	Points	Matches	Wins	Draws	Losses	Goals For	Goals Away	Avg%
66th	1	2	0	1	1	2	4	16%

=== Copa Sudamericana ===
==== First round ====
20 August 2013	Sport (Brazil)	2–0	(Brazil) Náutico	Recife
19:30 (UTC-3)	Felipe Azevedo 5'; Patric 43'	Report		Stadium: Estádio Adelmar da Costa Carvalho (Ilha do Retiro); Attendance: 16,125; Referee: Sandro Meira Ricci (Brazil)

28 August 2013	Náutico (Brazil)	2–0 (1–3 p)	(Brazil) Sport	São Lourenço da Mata
21:50 (UTC-3)	Elicarlos 45+3'; Olivera 64'	Report		Stadium: Estádio Governador Carlos Wilson Campos (Arena Pernambuco); Attendance: 8,320; Referee: Héber Roberto Lopes (Brazil)
	Penalties
	Olivera (penalty missed); Tiago Real (penalty missed); Jonatas Belusso (penalty scored); Rogério (penalty missed)		(penalty scored) Felipe Azevedo; (penalty scored) Marcelo Cordeiro; (penalty scored) Patric

==== Record ====
Final Position	Points	Matches	Wins	Draws	Losses	Goals For	Goals Away	Avg%
22nd	3	2	1	0	1	2	2	50%

=== Série A ===
26 May 2013 1	Grêmio	2–0	Náutico	Caxias do Sul
16:00 (UTC-3)	Zé Roberto 15'; Elano 70'	Report		Stadium: Estádio Alfredo Jaconi; Attendance: 9,560; Referee: Guilherme Ceretta de Lima

29 May 2013 2	Náutico	0–3	Vitória	Recife
21:00 (UTC-3)		Report	Maxi Biancucchi 13', 49'; Edson Magal 45+2'	Stadium: Estádio Eládio de Barros Carvalho (Aflitos); Attendance: 11,230; Referee: Alicio Pena Junior

2 June 2013 3	Náutico	2–2	Portuguesa	Recife
18:30 (UTC-3)	Rogério 16'; Marcos Vinícius 90+3'	Report	Michel Douglas 32'; Romão 82'	Stadium: Estádio Eládio de Barros Carvalho (Aflitos); Attendance: 15,013; Referee: Dewson Fernando Freitas da Silva

5 June 2013 4	Flamengo	0–1	Náutico	Florianópolis
22:00 (UTC-3)		Report	Rogério 82'	Stadium: Estádio Orlando Scarpelli; Attendance: 5,241; Referee: André Luiz de Freitas Castro

9 June 2013 5	Coritiba	1–0	Náutico	Curitiba
18:30 (UTC-3)	Deivid 1'	Report		Stadium: Estádio Major Antônio (Couto Pereira); Attendance: 16,815; Referee: Pablo Ramon Gonçalves Pinheiro

6 July 2013 6	Náutico	1–3	Ponte Preta	São Lourenço da Mata
18:30 (UTC-3)	Caion 72'	Report	Diego Sacoman 11'; William 43'; Rildo 55'	Stadium: Estádio Governador Carlos Wilson Campos (Arena Pernambuco); Attendance: 20,413; Referee: Heber Roberto Lopes

14 July 2013 7	Cruzeiro	3–0	Náutico	Belo Horizonte
18:30 (UTC-3)	Ricardo Goulart 9'; Vinícius Araújo 53', 69'	Report		Stadium: Estádio Governador Magalhães Pinto (Mineirão); Attendance: 15,528; Referee: Márcio Chagas da Silva

20 July 2013 8	Botafogo	2–0	Náutico	Rio de Janeiro
18:30 (UTC-3)	Elias 49'; Renato 77'	Report		Stadium: Estádio Vasco da Gama (São Januário); Attendance: 6,567; Referee: Elmo Alves Resende Cunha

28 July 2013 9	Náutico	3–0	Internacional	São Lourenço da Mata
16:00 (UTC-3)	Derley 72'; Maikon Leite 88'; Rogério 90+1'	Report		Stadium: Estádio Governador Carlos Wilson Campos (Arena Pernambuco); Attendance: 19,488; Referee: Dewson Fernando Freitas da Silva

3 September 2013 10	Náutico	0–1	São Paulo	São Lourenço da Mata
21:00 (UTC-3)		Report	Aloísio 72'	Stadium: Estádio Governador Carlos Wilson Campos (Arena Pernambuco); Attendance: 12,217; Referee: Leandro Vuaden

25 September 2013 11	Santos	1–1	Náutico	Santos
21:00 (UTC-3)	Cícero 85'	Report	Maikon Leite 82'	Stadium: Estádio Urbano Caldeira (Vila Belmiro); Attendance: 5,108; Referee: Francisco Carlos do Nascimento

7 August 2013 12	Goiás	2–1	Náutico	Goiânia
21:50 (UTC-3)	Walter 26', 52'	Report	Auremir 34'	Stadium: Estádio do Governo do Estado de Goiás (Serra Dourada); Attendance: 5,761; Referee: Jean Pierre Goncalves Lima

10 August 2013 13	Náutico	0–0	Atlético Mineiro	São Lourenço da Mata
18:30 (UTC-3)		Report		Stadium: Estádio Governador Carlos Wilson Campos (Arena Pernambuco); Attendance: 19,997; Referee: Italo Medeiros de Azevedo

14 August 2013 14	Criciúma	3–0	Náutico	Criciúma
19:30 (UTC-3)	João Vitor 10'; Marlon 31'; Leonardo 39'	Report		Stadium: Estádio Heriberto Hülse; Attendance: 7,625; Referee: Diego Almeida Real

17 August 2013 15	Náutico	0–1	Fluminense	São Lourenço da Mata
18:30 (UTC-3)		Report	Samuel 70'	Stadium: Estádio Governador Carlos Wilson Campos (Arena Pernambuco); Attendance: 16,583; Referee: Paulo César de Oliveira

25 August 2013 16	Bahia	2–0	Náutico	Salvador
16:00 (UTC-3)	Hélder 57'; Fernandão 77'	Report		Stadium: Itaipava Arena Fonte Nova; Attendance: 10,614; Referee: Wagner do Nascimento Magalhães

31 August 2013 17	Náutico	1–4	Atlético Paranaense	São Lourenço da Mata
18:30 (UTC-3)	Olivera 42'	Report	Léo Morais 4'; Everton 18'; Éderson 79', 90'	Stadium: Estádio Governador Carlos Wilson Campos (Arena Pernambuco); Attendance: 11,263; Referee: André Luiz de Freitas Castro

5 September 2013 18	Náutico	0–3	Vasco da Gama	São Lourenço da Mata
21:00 (UTC-3)		Report	Willie 47'; Marlone 51', 90+1'	Stadium: Estádio Governador Carlos Wilson Campos (Arena Pernambuco); Attendance: 8,153; Referee: Jailson Macedo Freitas

8 September 2013 19	Corinthians	0–0	Náutico	São Paulo
16:00 (UTC-3)		Report		Stadium: Estádio Municipal Paulo Machado de Carvalho (Pacaembu); Attendance: 22,712; Referee: Felipe Gomes da Silva

11 September 2013 20	Náutico	0–2	Grêmio	São Lourenço da Mata
21:50 (UTC-3)		Report	Barcos 25'; Paulinho Moccelin 81'	Stadium: Estádio Governador Carlos Wilson Campos (Arena Pernambuco); Attendance: 6,826; Referee: Francisco de Assis Almeida Filho

15 September 2013 21	Vitória	2–1	Náutico	Salvador
18:30 (UTC-3)	Dinei 20', 70'	Report	Hugo Cabral 14'	Stadium: Estádio Manoel Barradas (Barradão); Attendance: 10,054; Referee: Jean Pierre Goncalves Lima

19 September 2013 22	Portuguesa	3–0	Náutico	São Paulo
21:00 (UTC-3)	Moisés 8'; Gilberto 35'; Bruno Henrique 41'	Report		Stadium: Estádio Oswaldo Teixeira Duarte (Canindé); Attendance: 1,808; Referee: Ricardo Marques Ribeiro

22 September 2013 23	Náutico	0–0	Flamengo	São Lourenço da Mata
16:00 (UTC-3)		Report		Stadium: Estádio Governador Carlos Wilson Campos (Arena Pernambuco); Attendance: 15,003; Referee: Wilson Luiz Seneme

28 September 2013 24	Náutico	3–0	Coritiba	São Lourenço da Mata
18:30 (UTC-3)	Olivera 51'; Maikon Leite 76', 83'	Report		Stadium: Estádio Governador Carlos Wilson Campos (Arena Pernambuco); Attendance: 7,065; Referee: Claudio Francisco Lima e Silva

1 October 2013 25	Ponte Preta	1–2	Náutico	Campinas
19:30 (UTC-3)	William 45'	Report	Hugo Cabral 80'; Maikon Leite 90+2'	Stadium: Estádio Moisés Lucarelli; Attendance: 12,625; Referee: Antônio Denival de Morais

6 October 2013 26	Náutico	1–4	Cruzeiro	São Lourenço da Mata
16:00 (UTC-3)	Maikon Leite 28'	Report	Ricardo Goulart 9', 52'; Everton Ribeiro 58' (pen.); Mayke 76'	Stadium: Estádio Governador Carlos Wilson Campos (Arena Pernambuco); Attendance: 20,661; Referee: Dewson Fernando Freitas da Silva

9 October 2013 27	Náutico	1–3	Botafogo	São Lourenço da Mata
21:50 (UTC-3)	Maikon Leite 9'	Report	Rafael Marques 25'; Seedorf 39'; Gegê 90'	Stadium: Estádio Governador Carlos Wilson Campos (Arena Pernambuco); Attendance: 6,658; Referee: Marcos Andre Gomes da Penha

13 October 2013 28	Internacional	4–1	Náutico	Caxias do Sul
16:00 (UTC-3)	D'Alessandro 18'; Otávio 45+1'; Willians 69'; Kléber 82'	Report	Tiago Real 27'	Stadium: Estádio Francisco Stédile (Centenário); Attendance: 3,672; Referee: Emerson de Almeida Ferreira

16 October 2013 29	São Paulo	3–0	Náutico	São Paulo
21:00 (UTC-3)	Ademilson 30'; Ganso 65'; Welliton 73'	Report		Stadium: Estádio Cícero Pompeu de Toledo (Morumbi); Attendance: 14,942; Referee: Elmo Alves Resende Cunha

19 October 2013 30	Náutico	1–5	Santos	São Lourenço da Mata
18:30 (UTC-3)	Maikon Leite 50'	Report	Thiago Ribeiro 1'; Cícero 21', 89'; Everton Costa 24'; Cicinho 26'	Stadium: Estádio Governador Carlos Wilson Campos (Arena Pernambuco); Attendance: 5,452; Referee: Rodrigo Nunes de Sá

27 October 2013 31	Náutico	0–2	Goiás	São Lourenço da Mata
18:30 (UTC-3)		Report	Welinton Júnior 1'; Amaral 41'	Stadium: Estádio Governador Carlos Wilson Campos (Arena Pernambuco); Attendance: 3,558; Referee: Emerson de Almeida Ferreira

2 November 2013 32	Atlético Mineiro	5–0	Náutico	Belo Horizonte
21:00 (UTC-3)	Fernandinho 10'; Jô 23'; Guilherme 57'; Diego Tardelli 67'; Alecsandro 74'	Report		Stadium: Estádio Raimundo Sampaio (Independência); Attendance: 13,255; Referee: Wagner Reway

10 November 2013 33	Náutico	0–1	Criciúma	São Lourenço da Mata
19:30 (UTC-3)		Report	Wellington Paulista 70'	Stadium: Estádio Governador Carlos Wilson Campos (Arena Pernambuco); Attendance: 2,797; Referee: Francisco Carlos do Nascimento

14 November 2013 34	Fluminense	2–0	Náutico	Rio de Janeiro
21:00 (UTC-3)	Wágner 16'; Samuel 50'	Report		Stadium: Estádio Jornalista Mário Filho (Maracanã); Attendance: 30,844; Referee: Marcos Andre Gomes da Penha

17 November 2013 35	Náutico	0–1	Bahia	São Lourenço da Mata
19:30 (UTC-3)		Report	Fernandão 82'	Stadium: Estádio Governador Carlos Wilson Campos (Arena Pernambuco); Attendance: 2,721; Referee: Elmo Alves Resende Cunha

24 November 2013 36	Atlético Paranaense	6–1	Náutico	Joinville
17:00 (UTC-3)	Zezinho 26'; Paulo Baier 27'; Felipe Silva 52', 62'; Éderson 60'; Cleberson 71'	Report	Tiago Real 46'	Stadium: Arena Joinville; Attendance: 2,472; Referee: Arilson Bispo da Anunciação

1 December 2013 37	Vasco da Gama	2–0	Náutico	Rio de Janeiro
17:00 (UTC-3)	Edmílson 5'; Bernardo 86'	Report		Stadium: Estádio Jornalista Mário Filho (Maracanã); Attendance: 55,914; Referee: Anderson Daronco

7 December 2013 38	Náutico	1–0	Corinthians	São Lourenço da Mata
19:30 (UTC-3)	Derley 51'	Report		Stadium: Estádio Governador Carlos Wilson Campos (Arena Pernambuco); Attendance: 9,716; Referee: Elmo Alves Resende Cunha

==== Record ====
Final Position	Points	Matches	Wins	Draws	Losses	Goals For	Goals Away	Avg%
20th	20	38	5	5	28	22	79	17%
