= Maktom =

Brazilian footballer

Personal information
- Full name: Maktom Chaidey da Costa Nogueira
- Date of birth: 4 March 1998 (age 28)
- Place of birth: Divinópolis, Brazil
- Height: 1.85 m (6 ft 1 in)
- Position: Midfielder

Team information
- Current team: Cruzeiro

Youth career
- –2018: América
- 2018–: Cruzeiro

Senior career*
Years	Team	Apps	(Gls)
2016–2018	América	4	(0)
2017	→ Tombense (loan)	0	(0)
2018–	Cruzeiro	0	(0)
- * Club domestic league appearances and goals as of 20:31, 29 May 2019 (UTC)

Maktom Chaidey da Costa Nogueira (born 4 March 1998), commonly known as Maktom or Makton, is a Brazilian footballer who currently plays as a midfielder for Cruzeiro.

== Career statistics ==
=== Club ===
As of 29 May 2019.

Club	Season	League			State League		Cup		Continental		Other		Total	
Club	Season	Division	Apps	Goals	Apps	Goals	Apps	Goals	Apps	Goals	Apps	Goals	Apps	Goals
América	2016	Série A	4	0	0	0	0	0	0	0	0	0	4	0
América	2017	Série A	0	0	1 (Note: Appearances in the Campeonato Mineiro)	0	0	0	0	0	0	0	1	0
América	2018	Série A	0	0	0	0	0	0	0	0	0	0	0	0
América	Total		4	0	1	0	0	0	0	0	0	0	5	0
Tombense (loan)	2017	Série C	0	0	0	0	0	0	–		0	0	0	0
Cruzeiro	2018	Série A	0	0	0	0	0	0	0	0	0	0	0	0
Cruzeiro	2019	Série A	0	0	0	0	0	0	0	0	0	0	0	0
Cruzeiro	Total		0	0	0	0	0	0	0	0	0	0	0	0
Career total			4	0	1	0	0	0	0	0	0	0	5	0
