= Valdomiro =

Valdomiro may refer to:

- Valdomiro (footballer, born 1946), Brazilian football winger who participated in 1974 FIFA World Cup.
- Valdomiro (footballer, born 1979), Brazilian football centre-back
