= Ivan (footballer, born 1992) =

Brazilian footballer

Personal information
- Full name: Ivan Aparecido Martins
- Date of birth: 25 August 1992 (age 34)
- Place of birth: Jaú, Brazil
- Height: 1.70 m (5 ft 7 in)
- Position: Right back

Youth career
- Portuguesa

Senior career*
Years	Team	Apps	(Gls)
2011–2013	Portuguesa	25	(1)
2014–2015	Coritiba	25	(0)
2014	→ Atlético Sorocaba (loan)	2	(0)
2016	Bragantino	8	(0)
2017	Água Santa	16	(0)
2018	Ituano	2	(0)
2018	Fortaleza	6	(0)
2019	ABC	37	(3)
2020–2021	Caxias	29	(5)
2021	Goiás	17	(0)
2022	Mirassol	19	(1)
2023	São Bento	10	(0)
2023	Ypiranga Erechim	9	(0)
- * Club domestic league appearances and goals as of 26 August 2023

Ivan Aparecido Martins (born 25 August 1992), simply known as Ivan, is a Brazilian footballer who plays as a right back.

== Club career ==
Born in Jaú, São Paulo, Ivan graduated with Portuguesa's youth setup. On 15 July 2011, he made his first team debut, starting in a 2–1 away win against Boa Esporte for the Série B championship.

Ivan made his Série A debut on 23 June 2012, starting and scoring the game's only in a home success against São Paulo. He would subsequently appear rarely, spending the campaign as a backup to Luis Ricardo.

On 7 February 2014 Ivan signed for Coritiba, being immediately loaned to Campeonato Paulista strugglers Atlético Sorocaba. He returned to Coxa in May, and made his debut for the club on 14 September, playing the full 90 minutes in a 1–2 away loss against Santos.

== Honours ==
Portuguesa

- Campeonato Brasileiro Série B: 2011
- Campeonato Paulista Série A2: 2013
