= Cassius (footballer) =

Brazilian footballer (born 1995)

Personal information
- Full name: Cassius Vinicius Coelho
- Date of birth: 15 June 1995 (age 31)
- Place of birth: Campo Grande, Brazil
- Height: 1.92 m (6 ft 3 1/2 in)
- Position: Centre-back

Team information
- Current team: Águia de Marabá
- Number: 28

Youth career
- 2005–2011: São Paulo
- 2011–2013: Portuguesa

Senior career*
Years	Team	Apps	(Gls)
2013–2016	Portuguesa	0	(0)
2016	→ Santos (loan)	0	(0)
2017	URT	1	(0)
2018	Grêmio Anápolis	6	(0)
2018	Zimbru Chișinău	6	(0)
2019	Amora	3	(0)
2020	Anapolina	2	(0)
2020	Vllaznia Shkodër	0	(0)
2020–2021	Sfântul Gheorghe	4	(0)
2022	Audax-RJ	1	(0)
2023	Becamex Binh Duong	6	(0)
2023–	Águia de Marabá	0	(0)
- * Club domestic league appearances and goals as of 20 April 2022

Cassius Vinicius Coelho (born 15 June 1995), simply known as Cassius, is a Brazilian footballer who plays as a central defender for Águia de Marabá.

== Club career ==
Born in Campo Grande, Mato Grosso do Sul, Cassius started his career with São Paulo at the age of ten. He was subsequently released, and joined Portuguesa in 2011.

Cassius was promoted to Lusa's main squad in 2013 by manager Péricles Chamusca, aged only 17. However, he failed to make a single appearance during the year, as his side suffered relegation from Série A.

In 2014, Cassius suffered a severe knee injury which kept him sidelined for one year. After again being not used, he left the club and joined Santos, in a one-year loan deal on 14 January 2016.

Cassius left Santos in the end of the year, without playing a single minute for either the first team or the B-side. In May 2017 he joined URT, and made his senior debut on 21 May by coming on as a second-half substitute for Allan Dias in a 3–0 Série D away loss against Portuguesa-RJ.

On 15 December 2017, Cassius joined Grêmio Anápolis. The following 6 August, after being sparingly used, he moved abroad and joined Moldovan National Division side FC Zimbru Chișinău on a one-and-a-half-year contract.

On 5 March 2019, Cassius switched teams and countries again, signing for Amora FC in the Campeonato de Portugal. After a spell at Anapolina, Cassius joined Albanian club KF Vllaznia Shkodër on 26 August 2020. However, only two months later, he left the club and moved to FC Sfântul Gheorghe Suruceni in Moldova. He left Sfântul Gheorghe in early January 2021.

== Career statistics ==
As of 5 April 2021

Club	Season	League			State League		Cup		Continental		Other		Total	
Club	Season	Division	Apps	Goals	Apps	Goals	Apps	Goals	Apps	Goals	Apps	Goals	Apps	Goals
Portuguesa	2013	Série A	0	0	0	0	0	0	0	0	—		0	0
Portuguesa	2014	Série B	0	0	0	0	0	0	—		—		0	0
Portuguesa	2015	Série C	0	0	0	0	0	0	—		—		0	0
Portuguesa	Total		0	0	0	0	0	0	0	0	—		0	0
Santos	2016	Série A	—		0	0	0	0	—		—		0	0
URT	2017	Série D	1	0	—		—		—		—		1	0
Grêmio Anápolis	2018	Goiano	—		6	0	—		—		—		6	0
Zimbru Chișinău	2018	Divizia Națională	6	0	—		1	1	—		—		7	1
Amora	2018–19	Campeonato de Portugal	3	0	—		—		—		—		3	0
Anapolina	2020	Goiano	—		2	0	—		—		—		2	0
Sfântul Gheorghe	2020–21	Divizia Națională	4	0	—		0	0	—		—		4	0
Total			14	0	8	0	0	0	0	0	0	0	23	1
