= Diego Viana =

Brazilian footballer (born 1983)

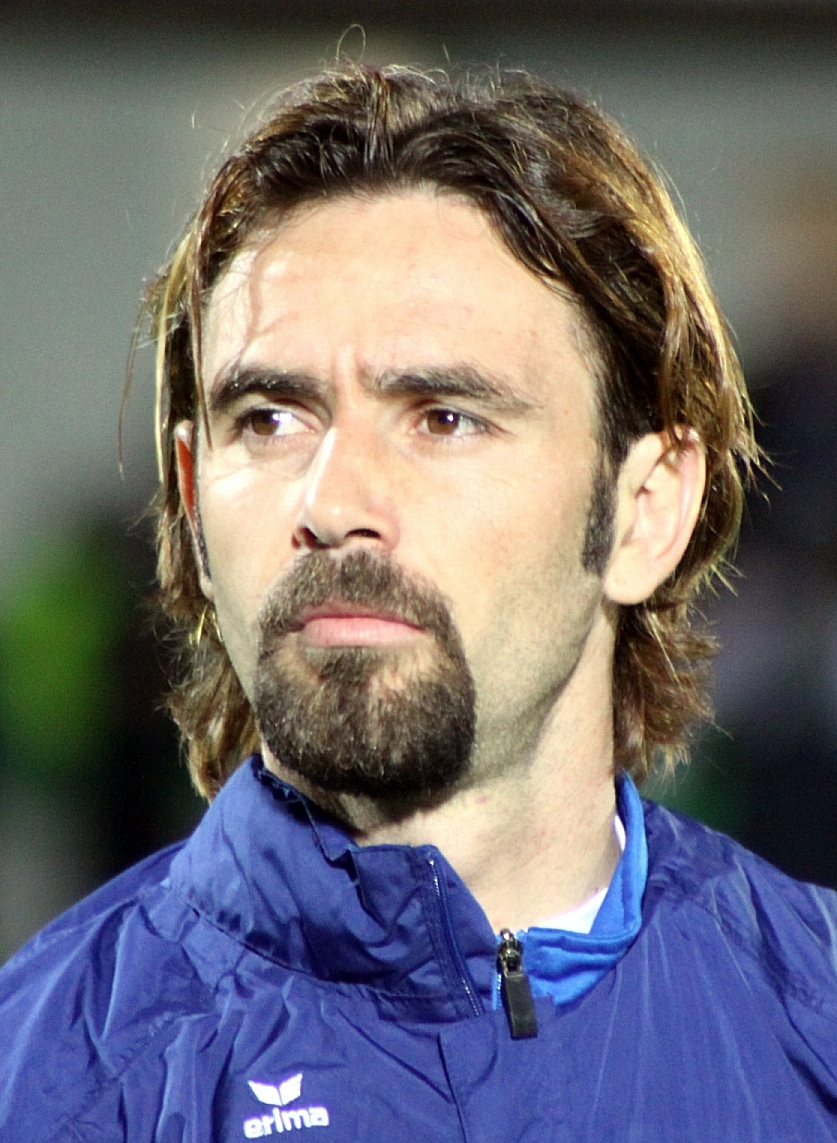

Personal information
- Full name: Diego Sehnem Viana
- Date of birth: 5 May 1983 (age 43)
- Place of birth: Feliz, Brazil
- Height: 1.82 m (5 ft 11 1/2 in)
- Position: Striker

Team information
- Current team: Avaí

Senior career*
Years	Team	Apps	(Gls)
2004–2005	Metropolitano	27	(17)
2005–2006	FC Lustenau	30	(38)
2006–2007	Greuther Furth	7	(1)
2008–2009	SV Grödig	32	(20)
2009–2012	SC Wiener Neustadt	28	(6)
2012–2014	Portuguesa	24	(1)
2014	Avaí	3	(0)
2015	Aimoré	4	(0)
2015	Blumenau		
2016	Aimoré	4	(0)
2016	Santo André	7	(3)
2016	Novo Hamburgo	6	(1)
- * Club domestic league appearances and goals

Diego Sehnem Viana (born 5 May 1983) is a Brazilian former footballer who played as a striker.
