= Ferdinando (footballer) =

Brazilian footballer (born 1980)

Personal information
- Full name: Ferdinando Pereira Leda
- Date of birth: 22 April 1980 (age 46)
- Place of birth: Grajaú, Brazil
- Height: 1.80 m (5 ft 11 in)
- Position: Defensive midfielder

Senior career*
Years	Team	Apps	(Gls)
2000–2004	Palmas		
2004	CFZ		
2005	Vitória		
2006–2010	Avaí		
2007	→ São Bento (loan)		
2010	→ Grêmio (loan)	30	(1)
2011	Portuguesa	37	(1)
2012	Incheon United	19	(0)
2012–2013	Portuguesa	68	(1)
2014	Júbilo Iwata	34	(5)
2015–2016	Portuguesa	33	(0)
2017	Avaí	3	(0)
2018–2019	Nacional-SP	11	(0)
2018	→ Novoperário (loan)	1	(0)
2020	Rio Claro	2	(0)
- * Club domestic league appearances and goals as of 19:51, 8 January 2022 (UTC)

Ferdinando Pereira Leda (born 22 April 1980) is a Brazilian footballer. Mainly a defensive midfielder, he can also play as a left back.

== Career ==
Until 2005 Ferdinando played for Centro de Futebol Zico Sociedade Esportiva. Then he was transferred to Avaí. In 2007, he was loaned to Esporte Clube São Bento and in 2010 to Grêmio.

On 26 January 2012, it was announced that Ferdinando joined South Korean club Incheon United.

== Honours ==
Portuguesa

- Campeonato Brasileiro Série B: 2011
- Campeonato Paulista Série A2: 2013
