= Alison (footballer, born 1983) =

Brazilian footballer

Personal information
- Full name: Alison Wágner Lira Ferreira
- Date of birth: 21 October 1983 (age 43)
- Place of birth: Parnamirim, Brazil
- Height: 1.86 m (6 ft 1 in)
- Position: Centre-back

Senior career*
Years	Team	Apps	(Gls)
2003	São Gonçalo–RN		
2003	→ Potiguar de Parnamirim (loan)		
2004–2007	Treze		
2005	→ Criciúma (loan)		
2007	→ Bahia (loan)		
2008–2010	Bahia		
2011–2012	Vitória	20	(1)
2012	→ ABC (loan)	7	(0)
2012–2013	Náutico	17	(0)
2014	Treze	4	(0)
2015–2016	América Mineiro	43	(3)
2017–2018	Ituano	5	(0)
2017	→ Santa Cruz (loan)	0	(0)
2019	América de Natal	3	(0)
- * Club domestic league appearances and goals

Alison Wágner Lira Ferreira (born 21 October 1983), simply known as Alison, is a Brazilian former professional footballer who played as a centre-back.

On 10 October 2019, 35-year old Alison announced his retirement.

== Career statistics ==
As of 17 April 2019

Appearances and goals by club, season and competition
Club	Season	League			State League		Cup		Continental		Other		Total	
Club	Season	Division	Apps	Goals	Apps	Goals	Apps	Goals	Apps	Goals	Apps	Goals	Apps	Goals
Bahia	2009	Série B	—		8	3	—		—		—		8	3
Bahia	2010	Série B	25	2	6	1	1	0	—		—		32	3
Bahia	Total		25	2	14	4	1	0	0	0	0	0	40	6
Vitória	2011	Série B	20	1	17	1	2	0	—		—		39	2
ABC	2012	Série B	7	0	—		1	0	—		—		8	0
Náutico	2012	Série A	10	0	—		—		—		—		10	0
Náutico	2013	Série A	7	0	14	1	1	0	—		—		22	1
Náutico	Total		17	0	14	1	1	0	0	0	0	0	32	1
Treze	2014	Série C	4	0	—		—		—		—		4	0
América Mineiro	2015	Série B	28	3	3	0	1	0	—		—		32	3
América Mineiro	2016	Série A	15	0	13	0	4	1	—		3 (Note: Appearance(s) in Primeira Liga)	0	35	1
América Mineiro	Total		43	3	16	0	5	1	0	0	3	0	67	4
Ituano	2017	Série D	5	0	—		—		—		—		5	0
Ituano	2018	Paulista	—		6	1	—		—		—		6	1
Ituano	Total		5	0	6	1	0	0	0	0	0	0	11	1
Santa Cruz	2017	Série B	0	0	—		—		—		—		0	0
América de Natal	2019	Série D	—		9	0	1	0	—		—		10	0
Career total			121	6	76	7	11	1	0	0	3	0	211	14
