= Carlos Alberto (footballer, born 1988) =

Brazilian footballer

Personal information
- Full name: Carlos Alberto da Silva Gonçalves Júnior
- Date of birth: 22 February 1988 (age 38)
- Place of birth: São Paulo, Brazil
- Height: 1.70 m (5 ft 7 in)
- Position: Midfielder

Team information
- Current team: Matonense
- Number: 18

Youth career
- 2005–2006: Palmeiras

Senior career*
Years	Team	Apps	(Gls)
2007–2011	Corinthians		
2008	→ São Caetano (loan)		
2008	→ CRB (loan)		
2008	→ Noroeste (loan)		
2009	→ Guaratinguetá (loan)	5	(0)
2010	→ Botafogo-SP (loan)		
2012	Treze	2	(0)
2012	Luverdense	16	(5)
2013	Mogi Mirim	18	(6)
2013–2015	Atlético Paranaense	3	(0)
2013–2014	→ Portuguesa (loan)	4	(0)
2014	→ Santa Cruz (loan)	14	(1)
2015	→ Paysandu (loan)	15	(0)
2016	Botafogo-SP	7	(0)
2016	Joinville	19	(3)
2017	Mirassol	6	(1)
2017	Campinense	2	(0)
2017	Birkirkara	19	(0)
2018	Água Santa	4	(0)
2019	Santo André	16	(3)
2019	Água Santa	6	(1)
2020–2021	Caxias	41	(1)
2022	Aimoré	6	(0)
2022	Esporte Clube Internacional de Santa Maria	5	(0)
2023	São Joseense	12	(1)
2023–	Matonense	2	(0)
- * Club domestic league appearances and goals as of 3 April 2019

Carlos Alberto da Silva Gonçalves Júnior (born February 22, 1988), known as Carlos Alberto, is a Brazilian professional footballer who plays as a midfielder for Matonense.
