= Souza (footballer, born 1979) =

Brazilian footballer (born 1979)

Personal information
- Full name: Willamis de Souza Silva
- Date of birth: February 4, 1979 (age 47)
- Place of birth: Maceió, Brazil
- Height: 1.76 m (5 ft 9 in)
- Positions: Attacking midfielder; right wing back

Senior career*
Years	Team	Apps	(Gls)
1998–2000	CSA		
2000–2001	Botafogo		
2001	Libertad		
2002	Guarani		
2002	CSA		
2003	Portuguesa Santista		
2003–2007	São Paulo		
2008–2009	Paris Saint-Germain		
2008–2009	→ Grêmio (loan)		
2010	Grêmio		
2011–2012	Fluminense		
2012–2013	Cruzeiro		
2013	→ Portuguesa (loan)		
2014	Ceará		
2015–2016	Passo Fundo		
2016	→ Caxias (loan)		
2017–2018	Brasiliense		
2019	Bagé		
2020–2021	Murici		
- * Club domestic league appearances and goals

Willamis de Souza Silva (born 4 February 1979), commonly known as Souza, is a Brazilian former professional footballer who played as a midfielder, and is now a television pundit for Bandeirantes.

== Honours ==
=== Club ===
CSA

- Campeonato Alagoano: 1999
- Copa CONMEBOL: Runners-up 1999

São Paulo

- Campeonato Paulista: 2005
- Copa Libertadores: 2005
- FIFA Club World Cup: 2005
- Campeonato Brasileiro Série A: 2006, 2007

Paris Saint-Germain

- Coupe de la Ligue: 2008

Grêmio

- Campeonato Gaúcho: 2010

Portuguesa

- Campeonato Paulista Série A2: 2013

Ceará

- Campeonato Cearense: 2014

Brasiliense

- Campeonato Brasiliense: 2017

=== Individual ===
- Campeonato Brasileiro Série A Team of the Year: 2006
