= Henrique Santos (footballer) =

Brazilian footballer (born 1990)

Personal information
- Full name: Henrique Campos Santos
- Date of birth: 15 December 1990 (age 35)
- Place of birth: São Paulo, Brazil
- Height: 1.69 m (5 ft 7 in)
- Position: Attacking midfielder

Youth career
- Portuguesa

Senior career*
Years	Team	Apps	(Gls)
2009–2013	Portuguesa	70	(11)
2012	→ Atlético Paranaense (loan)	23	(1)
2014–2015	Paraná	22	(2)
2015	→ Botafogo-SP (loan)	0	(0)
2015	América-MG	17	(0)
2016	XV de Piracicaba	0	(0)
2016	Cuiabá	3	(0)
2017	Novorizontino	0	(0)
2018	Novo Hamburgo	4	(0)
2018	Audax		
2019	Linense	0	(0)
2019	Tombense	7	(0)
2020–2021	Cascavel	54	(4)
2022	Votuporanguense	18	(0)
2022	Amazonas	5	(0)
2023–2024	Galo Maringá	5	(0)
2024	Chiangmai	9	(2)
- * Club domestic league appearances and goals as of 23:53, 25 June 2024 (UTC)

Henrique Campos Santos, sometimes known as just Henrique (born 15 December 1990), is a Brazilian footballer who plays as an attacking midfielder.

== Career ==
Born in São Paulo, Henrique Santos began his career on Portuguesa, and made his debut on 18 August 2009, against Campinense. On 19 March 2011, he scored his first professional goal, against Mirassol.

== Career statistics ==
As of 6 April 2017

Club	Season	League			State League		Cup		Continental		Other		Total	
Club	Season	Division	Apps	Goals	Apps	Goals	Apps	Goals	Apps	Goals	Apps	Goals	Apps	Goals
Portuguesa	2009	Série B	9	0	—		—		—		—		9	0
Portuguesa	2010	Série B	14	0	15	0	4	0	—		—		33	0
Portuguesa	2011	Série B	36	11	16	1	2	0	—		—		54	12
Portuguesa	2012	Série A	7	0	19	3	5	0	—		—		31	3
Portuguesa	2013	Série A	4	0	13	0	1	0	—		—		18	0
Portuguesa	Subtotal		70	11	63	4	12	0	—		—		145	15
Atlético Paranaense	2012	Série A	23	1	—		—		—		—		23	1
Paraná	2014	Série B	22	2	—		1	0	—		—		23	2
Botafogo–SP	2015	Série D	—		8	1	—		—		—		8	1
América–MG	2015	Série B	17	0	—		—		—		—		17	0
XV de Piracicaba	2016	Paulista	—		14	1	—		—		—		14	1
Cuiabá	2016	Série C	3	0	—		—		0	0	—		3	0
Novorizontino	2017	Paulista	—		9	0	—		—		—		9	0
Career total			135	14	94	6	13	0	0	0	0	0	242	20

== Honours ==
Portuguesa

- Campeonato Brasileiro Série B: 2011
- Campeonato Paulista Série A2: 2013
