= Lima (footballer, born 1985) =

Brazilian footballer

Personal information
- Full name: Willian Lanes de Lima
- Date of birth: 10 February 1985 (age 41)
- Place of birth: Ribeirão Preto, Brazil
- Height: 1.82 m (6 ft 0 in)
- Position: Centre back

Youth career
- 2003–2004: Corinthians-AL

Senior career*
Years	Team	Apps	(Gls)
2004–2007	Atlético Mineiro	38	(2)
2007–2009	Betis	10	(0)
2010–2012	Atlético Mineiro	19	(0)
2012–2013	Portuguesa	34	(0)
2014	Botafogo-SP	0	(0)
2014–2017	Fortaleza	31	(4)
2017	Ituano	14	(0)
2017–2019	América Mineiro	6	(0)
- * Club domestic league appearances and goals

Willian Lanes de Lima (born 10 February 1985), simply Lima, is a Brazilian former footballer who played as a central defender.

== Football career ==
Lima was signed by Real Betis from Clube Atlético Mineiro on the dying days of the 2007 summer transfer window, after some problems obtaining an Italian passport in order to qualify for European Union citizenship, which were resolved on August 29. His official unveiling by the club was postponed as a mark of respect following the death of Antonio Puerta, who played for local rivals Sevilla FC.

During his stay, Lima struggled mightily with first team opportunities, making his La Liga debut on 31 October 2007, in a 0–3 home loss against CA Osasuna. His second season consisted of 36 minutes against FC Barcelona: after having replaced captain Juanito, he also had to be stretchered off, in a 2–2 home draw; eventually, the Andalusians were relegated.

In 2010, after failing his medical at Clube de Regatas do Flamengo, where he was supposed to move on loan, Lima signed with former side Atlético Mineiro.

== Honours ==
Atlético Mineiro

- Série B: 2006
- Campeonato Mineiro: 2007, 2010

Portuguesa

- Campeonato Paulista Série A2: 2013

América Mineiro

- Campeonato Brasileiro Série B: 2017
