= Rogério (footballer, born 1984) =

Brazilian footballer

Personal information
- Full name: Rogério Rodrigues da Silva
- Date of birth: March 14, 1984 (age 42)
- Place of birth: Americana, Brazil
- Height: 1.80 m (5 ft 11 in)
- Position: Centre back

Team information
- Current team: Uberlândia

Youth career
- Cruzeiro

Senior career*
Years	Team	Apps	(Gls)
2004–2008	Cruzeiro	0	(0)
2005	→ Uberlândia (loan)	?	(?)
2006	→ Rio Branco-MG (loan)	?	(?)
2006	→ Unitri (loan)	?	(?)
2007	→ XV de Piracicaba (loan)	?	(?)
2008–2010	Uberaba	22	(0)
2011	Uberlândia	13	(0)
2011–2013	Portuguesa	88	(4)
2014	Criciúma	0	(0)
2014–2016	Joinville	49	(5)
2016	Linense	0	(0)
2016–2017	Ituano	2	(0)
2017–	Uberlândia	0	(0)
- * Club domestic league appearances and goals as of 23 January 2016

Rogério Rodrigues da Silva (born 14 March 1984, in Americana) is a Brazilian footballer who plays for Uberlândia as a centre back.

== Career ==
Rogério began his footballing career on Cruzeiro's youth categories. He then failed to make a single appearance for the club, and was eventually loaned to lower clubs.

In 2008, Rogério signed a contract with Uberaba. After three years with Uberaba, he then signed with Uberlândia.

Later in the same year, Rogério signed a contract with Portuguesa.

== Honours ==
Portuguesa

- Série B: 2011
- Campeonato Paulista Série A2: 2013

Joinville

- Série B: 2014
