= 2017 Campeonato Brasileiro Série C =

Campeonato Brasileiro Série C
- Season: 2017
- Champions: CSA (1st title)
- Promoted: CSA; Fortaleza; Sampaio Corrêa; São Bento
- Relegated: ASA; Macaé; Mogi Mirim; Moto Club
- Matches: 194
- Goals: 418 (2.15 per match)
- Top goalscorer: 13 goals Rafael Grampola, Joinville
- Biggest home win: 8–1 Joinville v Mogi Mirim; R18, 9 September
- Biggest away win: 0–3 Bragantino v São Bento; R7, 24 June; Macaé v Volta Redonda; R10, 15 July; Mogi Mirim v Ypiranga; R14, 12 August
- Highest attendance: 43,778 Fortaleza 1–2 CSA; Finals 1st leg, 14 October
- Lowest attendance: 98 Mogi Mirim 3–0 Macaé; R17, 2 September
- Total attendance: 825,801
- Average attendance: 4,301

The 2017 Campeonato Brasileiro Série C, the third level of the Brazilian League, was contested by 20 clubs. The competition started on 14 May and ended on 21 October 2017.

CSA, Fortaleza, Sampaio Corrêa and São Bento qualified for the semi-finals and were promoted to the 2018 Campeonato Brasileiro Série B.

CSA won the title after defeating Fortaleza in the final.

== Teams ==
Location of teams in 2017 Série C

Pos.	Relegated from 2016 Serie B
17º	Joinville
18º	Bragantino
19º	Tupi
20º	Sampaio Corrêa

Pos.	Promoted from 2016 Serie D
1º	Volta Redonda
2º	CSA
3°	Moto Club
4º	São Bento

=== Number of teams by state ===
Number of teams	State	Team(s)
4	São Paulo	Botafogo, Bragantino, Mogi Mirim and São Bento
2	Alagoas	CSA and ASA
2	Maranhão	Moto Club and Sampaio Corrêa
2	Minas Gerais	Tupi and Tombense
2	Rio de Janeiro	Macaé and Volta Redonda
1	Ceará	Fortaleza
1	Mato Grosso	Cuiabá
1	Pará	Remo
1	Paraíba	Botafogo
1	Pernambuco	Salgueiro
1	Rio Grande do Sul	Ypiranga
1	Santa Catarina	Joinville
1	Sergipe	Confiança

== Personnel ==
Team	Home city	Manager
ASA	Arapiraca	(Brazil) Marcelo Vilar
Botafogo-PB	João Pessoa	(Brazil) Ramiro Souza
Botafogo-SP	Ribeirão Preto	(Brazil) Vica
Bragantino	Bragança Paulista	(Brazil) Marcelo Veiga
Confiança	Aracaju	(Brazil) Ailton Silva
CSA	Maceió	(Brazil) Flávio Araújo
Cuiabá	Cuiabá	(Brazil) Moacir Júnior
Fortaleza	Fortaleza	(Brazil) Antônio Carlos Zago
Joinville	Joinville	(Brazil) Fabinho Santos
Macaé	Macaé	(Brazil) Josué Teixeira
Mogi Mirim	Mogi Mirim	(Brazil) Lecheva
Moto Club	São Luís	(Brazil) Marcinho Guerreiro
Remo	Belém	(Brazil) Léo Goiano
Salgueiro	Salgueiro	(Brazil) Evandro Guimarães
Sampaio Corrêa	São Luís	(Brazil) Francisco Diá
São Bento	Sorocaba	(Brazil) Paulo Roberto Santos
Tombense	Tombos	(Brazil) Raul Cabral
Tupi	Juiz de Fora	(Brazil) Ailton Ferraz
Volta Redonda	Volta Redonda	(Brazil) Felipe Surian
Ypiranga	Erechim	(Brazil) Hélio Vieira

== Group stage ==
In the group stage, each group was played on a home-and-away round-robin basis. The teams were ranked according to points (3 points for a win, 1 point for a draw, and 0 points for a loss). If tied on points, the following criteria would be used to determine the ranking: 1. Wins; 2. Goal difference; 3. Goals scored; 4. Head-to-head (if the tie is only between two teams). If tied on aggregate, the away goals rule would be used (except if both teams share the same stadium); 5. Fewest red cards; 6. Fewest yellow cards; 7. Draw in the headquarters of the Brazilian Football Confederation (Regulations Article 14).

=== Group A ===
Pos	Team	Pld	W	D	L	GF	GA	GD	Pts	Qualification or relegation
1	Sampaio Corrêa (A)	18	9	5	4	24	20	+4	32	Advance to Final stages
2	CSA (A)	18	8	8	2	21	12	+9	32	Advance to Final stages
3	Fortaleza (A)	18	7	6	5	20	15	+5	27	Advance to Final stages
4	Confiança (A)	18	6	7	5	23	25	−2	25	Advance to Final stages
5	Salgueiro	18	7	3	8	19	16	+3	24	
6	Cuiabá	18	4	11	3	17	17	0	23	
7	Remo	18	5	7	6	19	21	−2	22	
8	Botafogo-PB	18	6	3	9	18	21	−3	21	
9	Moto Club (R)	18	5	5	8	18	20	−2	20	Relegation to 2018 Campeonato Brasileiro Série D
10	ASA (R)	18	2	7	9	11	23	−12	13	Relegation to 2018 Campeonato Brasileiro Série D

Source: Soccerway.com
Rules for classification: 1) points; 2) wins; 3) goal difference; 4) goals scored; 5) head-to-head results; 6) least red cards received; 7) least yellow cards received; 8) draw.
(A) Advance to a further round; (R) Relegated

Home \ Away	ASA	BPB	CON	CSA	CUI	FOR	MOT	REM	SAL	SCO
ASA		2–1	1–2	0–0	2–3	1–1	0–1	1–0	1–1	0–1
Botafogo-PB	0–0		1–2	2–0	0–0	0–2	3–2	3–2	1–0	1–2
Confiança	1–1	0–1		2–0	1–1	2–0	1–1	0–1	2–1	2–2
CSA	3–0	2–1	1–1		0–0	1–0	2–1	2–0	2–0	1–1
Cuiabá	1–1	1–0	1–2	1–1		2–2	1–0	0–0	1–0	1–3
Fortaleza	3–0	1–0	1–1	1–1	1–1		1–0	1–1	1–0	3–0
Moto Club	1–1	0–0	4–0	1–1	1–0	1–0		1–1	0–2	1–2
Remo	1–0	2–1	2–2	1–1	1–1	1–0	3–2		0–1	1–2
Salgueiro	2–0	1–0	4–1	0–1	1–1	1–2	2–0	2–1		1–1
Sampaio Corrêa	1–0	2–3	2–1	0–2	1–1	2–0	0–1	1–1	1–0	

Updated to match(es) played on 9 September 2017. Source:
Legend: Blue = home team win; Yellow = draw; Red = away team win.

=== Group B ===
Pos	Team	Pld	W	D	L	GF	GA	GD	Pts	Qualification or relegation
1	São Bento (A)	18	8	7	3	20	10	+10	31	Advance to Final stages
2	Tupi (A)	18	7	7	4	21	18	+3	28	Advance to Final stages
3	Tombense (A)	18	6	8	4	19	17	+2	26	Advance to Final stages
4	Volta Redonda (A)	18	6	7	5	24	17	+7	25	Advance to Final stages
5	Joinville	18	6	7	5	28	23	+5	25	
6	Botafogo-SP	18	6	7	5	25	20	+5	25	
7	Ypiranga	18	5	8	5	23	21	+2	23	
8	Bragantino	18	4	9	5	16	19	−3	21	
9	Macaé (R)	18	5	4	9	16	28	−12	19	Relegation to 2018 Campeonato Brasileiro Série D
10	Mogi Mirim (R)	18	3	4	11	15	34	−19	13	Relegation to 2018 Campeonato Brasileiro Série D

Source: Soccerway.com
Rules for classification: 1) points; 2) wins; 3) goal difference; 4) goals scored; 5) head-to-head results; 6) least red cards received; 7) least yellow cards received; 8) draw.
(A) Advance to a further round; (R) Relegated

Home \ Away	BSP	BRA	JOI	MAC	MOG	SBT	TOM	TUP	VRE	YPI
Botafogo-SP		1–0	3–0	3–0	2–0	0–2	0–0	1–1	2–1	5–3
Bragantino	2–2		1–1	1–1	1–0	0–3	1–1	0–0	1–1	1–0
Joinville	1–0	2–0		2–4	8–1	1–1	2–0	1–1	2–0	2–1
Macaé	3–2	1–0	1–0		1–0	0–0	0–0	1–3	0–3	0–2
Mogi Mirim	2–2	2–4	1–1	3–0		0–0	1–1	2–0	2–1	0–3
São Bento	0–0	1–1	2–0	2–1	1–0		2–1	2–0	1–0	1–2
Tombense	2–1	0–0	2–2	2–1	2–1	3–2		1–1	0–0	3–0
Tupi	0–0	2–3	3–1	1–0	1–0	1–0	1–0		3–1	0–2
Volta Redonda	2–0	1–0	0–0	3–1	4–0	0–0	2–0	2–2		0–0
Ypiranga	1–1	0–0	2–2	1–1	2–0	0–0	0–1	1–1	3–3	

Updated to match(es) played on 9 September 2017. Source:
Legend: Blue = home team win; Yellow = draw; Red = away team win.

== Final Stage ==
In the final stage, each tie was played on a home-and-away two-legged basis. If tied on aggregate, the away goals rule would be used. If still tied, extra time would not be played, and the penalty shoot-out would be used to determine the winner (Regulations Article 15).

=== Bracket ===
Opening Round (Winner promoted)
(Ceará) Fortaleza	2	0	2
(Minas Gerais) Tupi	0	1	1
(Rio de Janeiro (state)) Volta Redonda	0	1	1
(Maranhão) Sampaio Corrêa	1	1	2
(Sergipe) Confiança	0	0	0
(São Paulo (state)) São Bento	2	0	2
(Minas Gerais) Tombense	0	0	0
(Alagoas) CSA	2	1	3

Semi-Finals
(Ceará) Fortaleza	1	2	3
(Maranhão) Sampaio Corrêa	0	2	2
(São Paulo (state)) São Bento	0	1	1 (2)
(Alagoas) CSA (p)	1	0	1 (4)

Finals
(Ceará) Fortaleza	1	0	1
(Alagoas) CSA	2	0	2

=== Quarter-finals ===
The matches were played between 16 and 25 September.

Team 1	Agg.	Team 2	1st leg	2nd leg
Volta Redonda (Rio de Janeiro (state))	1–2	(Maranhão) Sampaio Corrêa	0–1	1–1
Fortaleza (Ceará)	2–1	(Minas Gerais) Tupi	2–0	0–1
Tombense (Minas Gerais)	0–3	(Alagoas) CSA	0–2	0–1
Confiança (Sergipe)	0–2	(São Paulo (state)) São Bento	0–2	0–0

==== Group C ====
September 16, 2017	Volta Redonda (Rio de Janeiro (state))	0–1	(Maranhão) Sampaio Corrêa	Raulino de Oliveira, Volta Redonda
19:30		Report	Zaquel 90+1'	Attendance: 5,787; Referee: Ricardo Marques (Minas Gerais)

September 23, 2017	Sampaio Corrêa (Maranhão)	1–1	(Rio de Janeiro (state)) Volta Redonda	Castelão, São Luís
16:30	Fernando Sobral 81'	Report	Luan 86'	Attendance: 32,018; Referee: Leandro Vuaden (Rio Grande do Sul)

Sampaio Corrêa won 2–1 on aggregate and advanced to the semi-finals

==== Group D ====
September 16, 2017	Fortaleza (Ceará)	2–0	(Minas Gerais) Tupi	Castelão, Fortaleza
16:00	Leandro Lima 47'; Bruno Melo 69' (pen.)	Report		Attendance: 39,126; Referee: Marcelo Aparecido Ribeiro de Souza (São Paulo)

September 23, 2017	Tupi (Minas Gerais)	1–0	(Ceará) Fortaleza	Mário Helênio, Juiz de Fora
20:30	Fernando 81'	Report		Attendance: 5,751; Referee: Marcelo de Lima Henrique (Rio de Janeiro)

Fortaleza won 2–1 on aggregate and advanced to the semi-finals

==== Group E ====
September 18, 2017	Tombense (Minas Gerais)	0–2	(Alagoas) CSA	Almeidão, Tombos
20:45		Report	Michel Douglas 44'; Boquita 90+1'	Attendance: 3,050; Referee: Jaílson Macêdo Freitas (Bahia)

September 25, 2017	CSA (Alagoas)	1–0	(Minas Gerais) Tombense	Rei Pelé, Maceió
20:30	Edinho 17'	Report		Attendance: 19,105; Referee: Péricles Bassols Pegado Cortez (Pernambuco)

CSA won 3–0 on aggregate and advanced to the semi-finals

==== Group F ====
September 17, 2017	Confiança (Sergipe)	0–2	(São Paulo (state)) São Bento	Batistão, Aracaju
19:00		Report	Anderson Cavalo 15'; Everaldo 17'	Attendance: 15,356; Referee: Héber Lopes (Santa Catarina)

September 24, 2017	São Bento (São Paulo (state))	0–0	(Sergipe) Confiança	Walter Ribeiro, Sorocaba
19:00		Report		Attendance: 9,939; Referee: Dewson Fernando Freitas da Silva (Pará)

São Bento won 2–0 on aggregate and advanced to the semi-finals

=== Semi-finals ===
==== Semi-finals seedings ====
Seed	Team	Pts	W	GD
1	(Alagoas) CSA	38	10	+12
2	(Maranhão) Sampaio Corrêa	36	10	+5
3	(São Paulo (state)) São Bento	35	9	+12
4	(Ceará) Fortaleza	30	8	+6

The matches were played between 1 and 7 October.

Team 1	Agg.	Team 2	1st leg	2nd leg
Fortaleza (Ceará)	3–2	(Maranhão) Sampaio Corrêa	1–0	2–2
São Bento (São Paulo (state))	1–1 (2–4 p)	(Alagoas) CSA	0–1	1–0

==== Group G ====
October 2, 2017	Fortaleza (Ceará)	1–0	(Maranhão) Sampaio Corrêa	Castelão, Fortaleza
20:45	Leandro Cearense 59'	Report		Attendance: 28,277; Referee: Felipe Gomes da Silva (Paraná)

October 7, 2017	Sampaio Corrêa (Maranhão)	2–2	(Ceará) Fortaleza	Castelão, São Luís
17:00	Marlon 69' (pen.); Maracás 82'	Report	Bruno Melo 26', 90+4' (pen.)	Attendance: 18,575; Referee: Héber Lopes (Santa Catarina)

Fortaleza won 3–2 on aggregate and advanced to the Finals

==== Group H ====
October 1, 2017	São Bento (São Paulo (state))	0–1	(Alagoas) CSA	Walter Ribeiro, Sorocaba
19:00		Report	Michel Douglas 79'	Attendance: 3,681; Referee: Caio Max Augusto Vieira (Rio Grande do Norte)

October 7, 2017	CSA (Alagoas)	0–1 (4–2 p)	(São Paulo (state)) São Bento	Rei Pelé, Maceió
19:30		Report	Everaldo 90+2' (pen.)	Attendance: 12,121; Referee: Dewson Fernando Freitas da Silva (Pará)
	Penalties
	Daniel Costa (penalty scored); Edinho (penalty scored); Boquita (penalty scored); Dawhan (penalty missed); Maxuell (penalty scored)		(penalty scored) Maicon Souza; (penalty scored) Rennan Oliveira; (penalty missed) Branquinho; (penalty missed) Everaldo

Tied 1–1 on aggregate, CSA won on penalties and advanced to the Finals

=== Finals ===
==== Finals seedings ====
Seed	Team	Pts	W	GD
1	(Alagoas) CSA	41	11	+12
2	(Ceará) Fortaleza	34	9	+7

The matches were played on 14 and 21 October.

Team 1	Agg.	Team 2	1st leg	2nd leg
Fortaleza (Ceará)	1–2	(Alagoas) CSA	1–2	0–0

==== Group I ====
October 14, 2017	Fortaleza (Ceará)	1–2	(Alagoas) CSA	Castelão, Fortaleza
19:00	Gabriel Pereira 88'	Report	Michel Douglas 40'; Pablo 62' (o.g.)	Attendance: 44,778; Referee: Wagner Reway (Mato Grosso)

October 21, 2017	CSA (Alagoas)	0–0	(Ceará) Fortaleza	Rei Pelé, Maceió
19:00		Report		Attendance: 17,809; Referee: Luiz Flávio de Oliveira (São Paulo)
