= Matheus (footballer, born 1989) =

Brazilian footballer

Personal information
- Full name: Matheus Humberto Maximiano
- Date of birth: 31 May 1989 (age 37)
- Place of birth: Campinas, Brazil
- Height: 1.74 m (5 ft 9 in)
- Positions: Attacking midfielder; winger

Team information
- Current team: Caldense

Youth career
- Guarani

Senior career*
Years	Team	Apps	(Gls)
2009–2010	Guarani		
2009	→ Itapirense (loan)		
2010	→ Juventus-SC (loan)		
2010–2011	Avaí		
2011	→ Imbituba (loan)	0	(0)
2011	→ Daegu FC (loan)	9	(1)
2012–2014	Daegu FC	51	(6)
2013	→ Portuguesa (loan)	10	(0)
2015	Grêmio Maringá	0	(0)
2015	XV de Piracicaba	0	(0)
2016–2017	Thespakusatsu Gunma	27	(0)
2018	Penapolense	0	(0)
2018	Novoperário	2	(0)
2019	Nacional-SP	0	(0)
2020–	Caldense	0	(0)
- * Club domestic league appearances and goals as of 20:17, 19 April 2020 (UTC)

Matheus Humberto Maximiano (born 31 May 1989 in Campinas, São Paulo) is a Brazilian footballer who plays as a midfielder for Caldense.

== Career ==
On 13 July 2011, Matheus joined the South Korean K-League club Daegu FC on loan from Avaí Futebol Clube. After a short loan spell at the K-League outfit, he signed a three-year contract on a permanent deal.

In 2013, he returned to his country and joined Portuguesa.

== Club statistics ==
Updated to 23 February 2017.

Club performance			League		Cup		Total	
Season	Club	League	Apps	Goals	Apps	Goals	Apps	Goals
Japan			League		Emperor's Cup		Total	
2016	Thespakusatsu Gunma	J2 League	16	0	2	0	18	0
Total			16	0	2	0	18	0
