= Bruninho (footballer, born 1992) =

Brazilian footballer

Bruno Lima
Personal information
- Full name: Bruno Felipe Lima Teixeira
- Date of birth: 18 September 1992 (age 34)
- Place of birth: São Paulo, Brazil
- Height: 1.78 m (5 ft 10 in)
- Position: Midfielder

Team information
- Current team: Al-Hussein

Youth career
- Portuguesa

Senior career*
Years	Team	Apps	(Gls)
2011–2014	Portuguesa	20	(0)
2014–2016	Palmeiras	4	(0)
2015	→ Santa Cruz (loan)	26	(1)
2016	→ Mogi Mirim (loan)	11	(1)
2016–2017	→ Juventude (loan)	28	(0)
2018	Juventude	14	(0)
2019–2020	XV de Piracicaba	30	(0)
2020	Brasiliense	24	(0)
2021	Ituano	27	(1)
2022	Oeste	19	(1)
2023	ABC	8	(0)
2023–	Al-Hussein		
- * Club domestic league appearances and goals as of 9 June 2023

Bruno Felipe Lima Teixeira (born 18 September 1992), commonly known as Bruno Lima, is Brazilian footballer who plays for Jordanian club Al-Hussein as a defensive midfielder.

== Career ==
Born in São Paulo, Bruninho began his career on Portuguesa and made his debut on 19 May 2012, coming on as a late substitute for Wilson Tiago in a 1–1 away draw against Palmeiras for the Série A championship. He was handed his first start on 1 September, in a 0–2 away loss against Vasco.

On 12 April 2014 Bruninho signed a four-year deal with Palmeiras, after rescinding with Lusa. On 1 February 2015, after being rarely used, he was loaned to Santa Cruz.

== Honours ==
=== Portuguesa ===
- Série B: 2011
- Paulistão Série A2: 2013
