= Gideão =

Brazilian footballer (born 1987)

Personal information
- Full name: Gideão Lima de Castro
- Date of birth: 19 December 1987 (age 38)
- Place of birth: Vitória, Brazil
- Height: 1.91 m (6 ft 3 in)
- Position: Goalkeeper

Team information
- Current team: Parnahyba

Senior career*
| Years | Team | Apps | (Gls) |
| 2007–2008 | Rio Branco-ES | | |
| 2008–2009 | Vera Cruz | | |
| 2008 | → Pernambucano (loan) | | |
| 2009 | → Potiguar (loan) | | |
| 2010–2015 | Náutico | 55 | (0) |
| 2014–2015 | → Moreirense (loan) | 0 | (0) |
| 2015–2017 | Boavista | 8 | (0) |
| 2017 | Tupi | 0 | (0) |
| 2018 | Altos | 10 | (0) |
| 2019 | Salgueiro | 0 | (0) |
| 2020– | ASA | 0 | (0) |
| 2021- | Parnahyba | 0 | (0) |
- * Club domestic league appearances and goals as of 22:42, 13 July 2019 (UTC)

Gideão Lima de Castro (born 19 December 1987), simply known as Gideão is a Brazilian professional footballer playing as a goalkeeper for Parnahyba Sport Club.
