= Rafael Chorão =

Brazilian footballer (born 1988)

Personal information
- Full name: Rafael Batista
- Date of birth: August 26, 1988 (age 38)
- Place of birth: Americana, Brazil
- Height: 1.82 m (6 ft 0 in)
- Position: Midfielder

Team information
- Current team: Ferroviário-CE

Senior career*
Years	Team	Apps	(Gls)
2006–2007	Rio Branco-SP		
2008–2009	Mirassol		
2009	Barretos		
2010	Monte Azul	5	(0)
2010–2011	Guaratinguetá	38	(3)
2012	Rio Branco-SP	22	(9)
2012	Grêmio Barueri	27	(3)
2012–2013	Portuguesa	9	(1)
2013–2014	Treze	10	(0)
2014	Rio Branco-PR	12	(0)
2014–2015	Botafogo-SP	1	(0)
2015–2016	Linense	2	(0)
2016	→ Votuporanguense (loan)	12	(2)
2017	Bragantino	39	(3)
2018	Água Santa	4	(0)
2018–2019	Bragantino	25	(2)
2020–	Operário Ferroviário	45	(0)
- * Club domestic league appearances and goals as of 24 March 2019

Rafael Batista (born 26 August 1988), better known as Rafael Chorão, is a Brazilian footballer as a midfielder.

== Career ==
Born in Americana, São Paulo, Rafael began his career in his hometown's Rio Branco and played for a host of clubs, being highlighted on Grêmio Barueri. In December 2012, he signed a contract with Portuguesa.
