= Marcelo Cañete =

Argentine footballer

Personal information
- Full name: Marcelo Cañete
- Date of birth: 16 April 1990 (age 36)
- Place of birth: Buenos Aires, Argentina
- Height: 1.75 m (5 ft 9 in)
- Position: Attacking midfielder

Team information
- Current team: Recoleta

Youth career
- 2008–2009: Boca Juniors

Senior career*
Years	Team	Apps	(Gls)
2010–2011	Boca Juniors	8	(1)
2011	→ Universidad Católica (loan)	13	(1)
2011–2015	São Paulo	17	(1)
2013	→ Portuguesa (loan)	17	(2)
2014	→ Náutico (loan)	18	(1)
2015	→ São Bernardo (loan)	12	(1)
2015	CRB	21	(1)
2016	São Bernardo	13	(2)
2016–2017	Libertad	30	(2)
2017–2018	Guaraní	21	(4)
2018	Sportivo Luqueño	12	(2)
2019	Deportivo Capiatá	6	(1)
2019–2021	Cobresal	42	(6)
2021–2022	Universidad de Chile	23	(2)
2022	→ Huachipato (loan)	19	(0)
2023–2024	Santiago Wanderers	44	(8)
2025	Sol de América	21	(2)
2026–	Recoleta	0	(0)
- * Club domestic league appearances and goals as of 11 January 2026

Marcelo Cañete (born 16 April 1990) is an Argentine-Paraguayan footballer who plays as an attacking midfielder for Paraguayan club Recoleta.

== Career ==
Cañete started his professional career with Boca Juniors, debuting with the first team in 2010. In 2011, he was loaned to Chilean Universidad Católica. After a good performance at Universidad Católica he was signed by São Paulo for three million US$ ($3,000,000). In 2013, he was loaned to Portuguesa. In 2014, he was back on São Paulo's roster but did not perform well. He suffered minor injuries, was taken off the squad and placed in the reserves. He later trained with the Sub-20 squad, in the training center in Cotia. He was loaned to Náutico August 2014.

In 2021, Cañete joined Universidad de Chile from Cobresal.

In January 2026, Cañete joined Recoleta.

== Personal life ==
Cañete naturalized Paraguayan since his mother is from Paraguay.

Cañete is the cousin of the footballer Ezequiel Cañete.
