= Juan Arraya =

Argentine footballer (born 1986)

Personal information
- Full name: Juan José Arraya
- Date of birth: 20 April 1986 (age 40)
- Place of birth: San Salvador, Argentina
- Height: 1.82 m (6 ft 0 in)
- Position: Forward

Youth career
- Gimnasia de Jujuy

Senior career*
Years	Team	Apps	(Gls)
2005–2017	Gimnasia de Jujuy	115	(23)
2006–2007	→ Juventud Antoniana (loan)	27	(12)
2010–2011	→ Universidad de Concepción (loan)	22	(3)
2012	→ Técnico Universitario (loan)	17	(8)
2013	→ Portuguesa (loan)	15	(8)
2013–2014	→ Huracán (loan)	16	(6)
2014	→ Patronato (loan)	16	(2)
2015	→ Santamarina (loan)	33	(6)
2016	→ Delfín (loan)	2	(0)
2018	Gimnasia y Tiro	9	(2)
2018	Portuguesa FC	11	(1)
2019	Atlético Cuyaya	4	(3)
2019	San Martín de Formosa	2	(0)
2020–2021	Atlético Cuyaya	9	(3)
2021	Deportivo YPF	3	(0)
Total		301	(77)
- * Club domestic league appearances and goals

Juan José Arraya (born 20 April 1986), known as Flecha Arraya, is a former Argentine footballer who played as a striker.

== Career ==
A product of Gimnasia y Esgrima de Jujuy, Arraya made his professional debut with them in 2005.

Besides Argentina, he played in Chile, Ecuador, Brazil and Venezuela.

In his last seasons, he played in his homeland for Club Atlético Cuyaya, San Martín de Formosa and Club Social y Deportivo YPF.
