= Estádio do Canindé =

Football stadium in São Paulo, Brazil

Coordinates: 23°31′14″S 46°37′06″W

Estádio Oswaldo Teixeira Duarte
- Estádio do Canindé
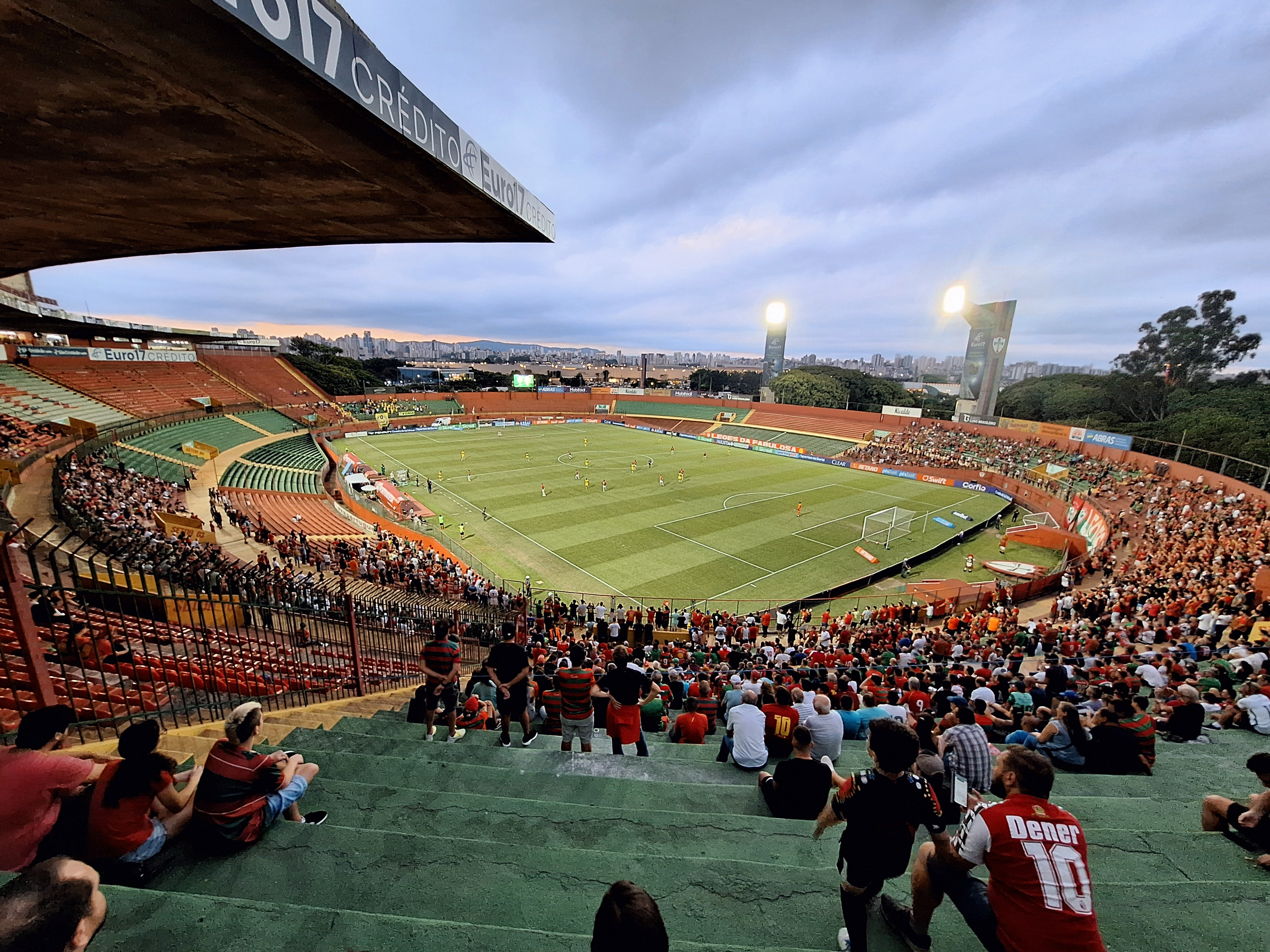
- Sisbrace
- Interactive map of Estádio Oswaldo Teixeira Duarte
- Full name: Estádio Oswaldo Teixeira Duarte
- Former names: Estádio Independência
- Location: São Paulo, São Paulo state, Brazil
- Owner: Associação Portuguesa de Desportos
- Capacity: 21.004
- Surface: Natural grass
- Record attendance: 28,204 (Portuguesa vs. São Paulo, 15 November 1983)
- Field size: 105 by 68 metres (114.8 yd × 74.4 yd)
- Public transit: Portuguesa-Tietê

Construction
- Opened: January 11, 1956
- Renovated: 1972–1973

Tenant
- Portuguesa (1956–present)

The Estádio do Canindé, also known as Estádio Oswaldo Teixeira Duarte, is a football stadium inaugurated on January 11, 1956 in Canindé neighborhood, São Paulo, São Paulo state, Brazil. The stadium is owned by Associação Portuguesa de Desportos. Its formal name honors Oswaldo Teixeira Duarte, a former president of Portuguesa.

Although the stadium's maximum capacity is 28,500 people, it has been artificially capped to 21,004.

== History ==
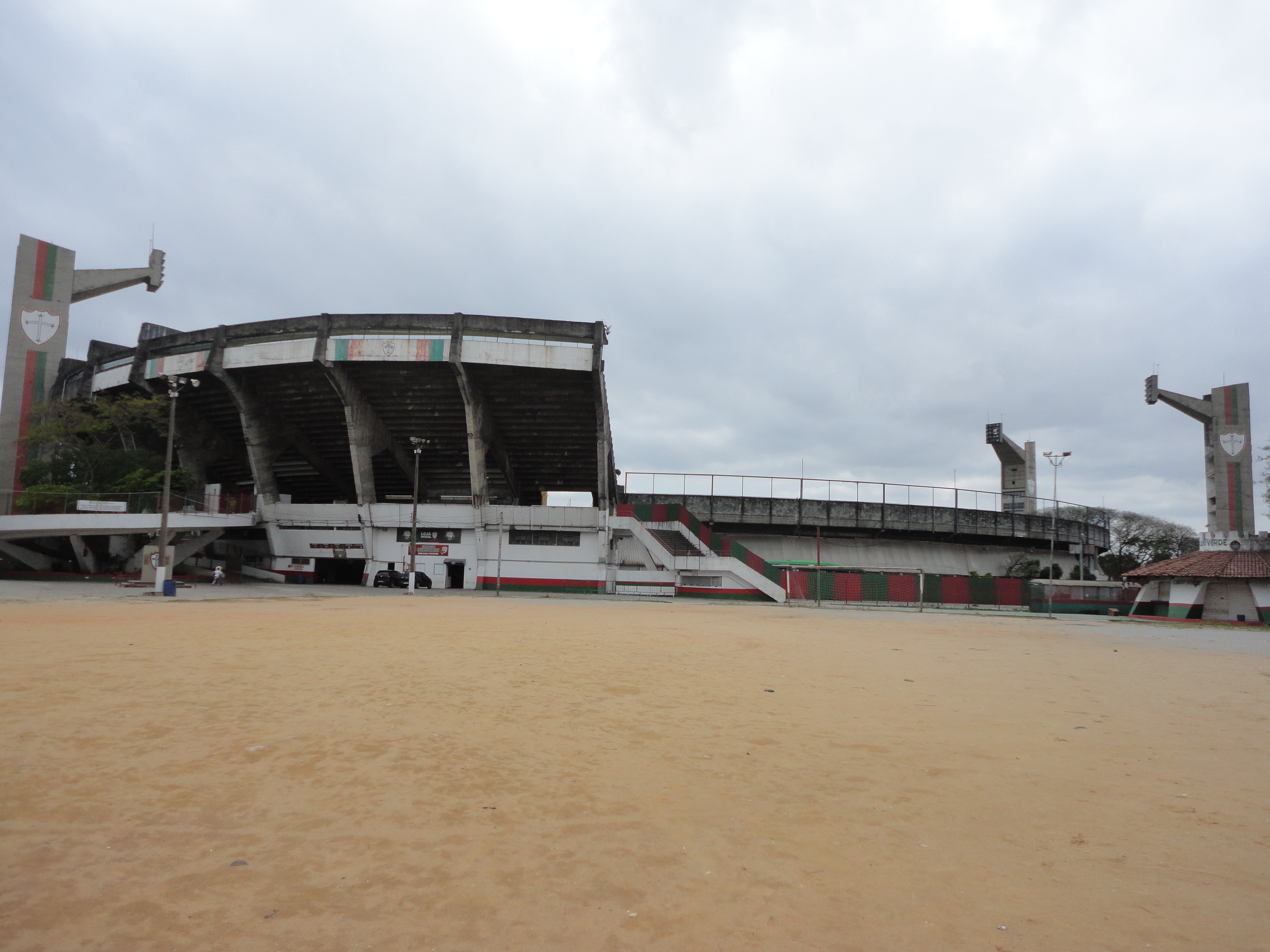
External view of the stadium, 2010

The stadium was built after Portuguesa bought in 1956, from São Paulo Futebol Clube, a plot of land located in Canindé neighborhood. At that time, the groundplot had only a training field, a restaurant with a great hall, dressing rooms and other minor installations. To be able to host games, following the requirements of Federação Paulista de Futebol, were built an area surrounded by a wire fence, an official football field and provisional wood bleachers, which gave the stadium the nickname "Ilha da Madeira" (Island of the Wood, in English).

The inaugural match was played on January 11, 1956, when Portuguesa beat a Palmeiras-São Paulo combined team 3–2. The first Portuguesa goal at the stadium was scored by Nelsinho.

During the administration of Oswaldo Teixeira Duarte, on January 9, 1956, Canindé's first ring was inaugurated, with a capacity of 10,000 spectators. The stadium was reinaugurated as Estádio Independência.

The reinaugural match was played on January 9, 1972, when Benfica beat Portuguesa, 3–1. The first goal of the stadium after its reinauguration was scored by Benfica's Vítor Baptista.

In 1973, the construction works of the second ring started, which sheltered the press cabins and the numbered chairs.

On January 11, 1981, the stadium floodlights were inaugurated with a commemorative tournament called Torneio dos Refletores, carried out with the help of Banco Itaú. The participating teams were Portuguesa, Corinthians, Fluminense and Sporting Lisboa. On January 15, 1981, Portuguesa won the tournament, after defeating Sporting, 2–0.

In 1984, the Portuguesa chairman of that time, Manoel Mendes Gregório, renamed the stadium to Estádio Oswaldo Teixeira Duarte.

The stadium's attendance record currently stands at 25,000, set on December 9, 1998, when Cruzeiro Esporte Clube beat Portuguesa, 1–0.

Also in this stadium, Corinthians scored the most goals in Brazilian League history, 10–1 against Tiradentes (PI) on September 2, 1983.

Following completion of renovations in 1973, a tractor had been left inside the ground and as a result of changes to the stadium, it was unable to be removed. The tractor was subsequently buried beneath the pitch.

== Bibliography ==
- Enciclopédia do Futebol Brasileiro, Volume 2 - Lance, Rio de Janeiro: Aretê Editorial S/A, 2001.
