= Luis Ricardo =

Brazilian footballer

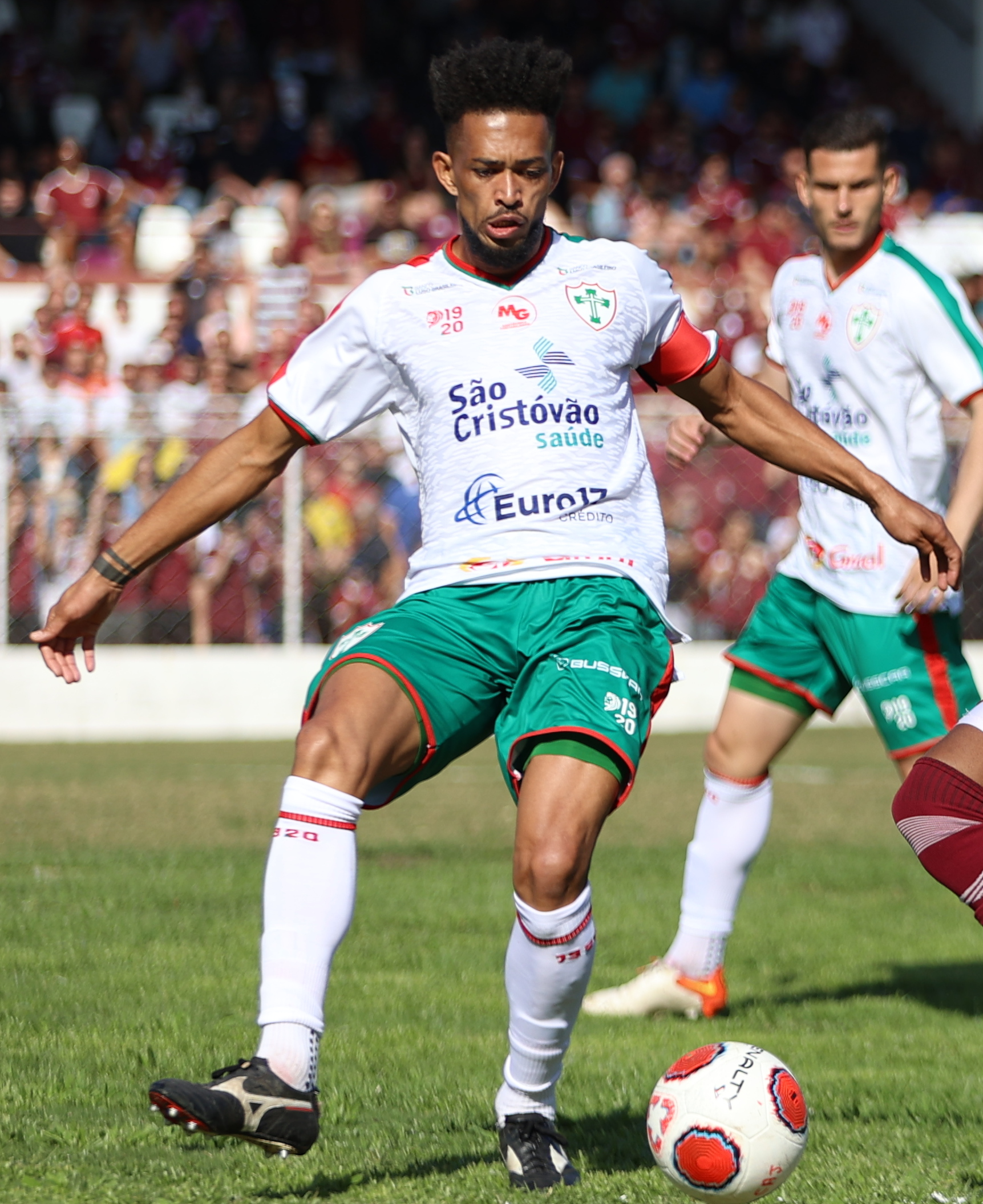

Personal information
- Full name: Luis Ricardo Silva Umbelino
- Date of birth: 21 January 1984 (age 42)
- Place of birth: Goiânia, Brazil
- Height: 1.84 m (6 ft 0 in)
- Position: Right back

Team information
- Current team: Metropolitano

Youth career
- 2002–2004: Anápolis
- 2004–2005: Vila Nova

Senior career*
Years	Team	Apps	(Gls)
2003–2005	Vila Nova	1	(0)
2005–2007	Grêmio		
2007	Marcílio Dias		
2008–2010	Avaí	35	(4)
2008	→ Ponte Preta (loan)	30	(11)
2009	→ Mirassol (loan)	21	(8)
2010–2013	Portuguesa	172	(18)
2014–2015	São Paulo	17	(1)
2015	→ Botafogo (loan)	40	(2)
2016–2018	Botafogo	59	(0)
2019	Ponte Preta	14	(0)
2019	Figueirense	12	(1)
2020	Água Santa	9	(0)
2020	Juventude	14	(0)
2021	Água Santa	16	(1)
2021	Oeste	9	(1)
2022	Portuguesa	17	(0)
- * Club domestic league appearances and goals as of 17 April 2022

Luis Ricardo Silva Umbelino (born 21 January 1984), known as Luis Ricardo, is a Brazilian footballer who plays for Metropolitano. Mainly a right back, he can perform equally as a right midfielder.

== Career ==
Born in Goiânia, Luis Ricardo began his professional career on Grêmio, and played for Marcílio Dias. After this, he signed a contract with Avaí. However, he failed to impress in the club, and was loaned to Ponte Preta and Mirassol. After the end of 2009 Campeonato Paulista, he returned to Avaí. He was a starter in a brilliant 2009 Série A made by Avaí, and on 5 February 2010, he was transferred to Portuguesa.

On 2013, after three years playing for Portuguesa de Desportos, Luis Ricardo was honored by fans of club. A big screen, in the game against Grêmio FBPA, for the last date of Brazilian League, showed his main moments for Lusa. In 2014, Ricardo will play for São Paulo FC.

== Honours ==
Portuguesa

- Campeonato Brasileiro Série B: 2011
- Campeonato Paulista Série A2: 2013

Botafogo

- Campeonato Brasileiro Série B: 2015
- Campeonato Carioca: 2018

Portuguesa

- Campeonato Paulista Série A2: 2022
