= Romão =

Brazilian footballer

Personal information
- Full name: Luiz Fernando Borges Romão
- Date of birth: 31 July 1989 (age 37)
- Place of birth: Jaú, Brazil
- Height: 1.89 m (6 ft 2 in)
- Position: Forward

Youth career
- XV de Jaú

Senior career*
Years	Team	Apps	(Gls)
2007–2008	São Carlos		
2007–2010	Ituano	23	(4)
2010	Internacional	0	(0)
2011	CSA	4	(0)
2011	→ Capivariano (loan)	30	(27)
2012	→ Guaratinguetá (loan)	4	(0)
2012	→ América-MG (loan)	8	(0)
2012–2013	Capivariano	32	(22)
2013–2014	Portuguesa	8	(3)
2014	Boa Esporte	7	(1)
2014–2016	Capivariano	17	(2)
2015–2016	→ Red Bull Brasil (loan)	6	(1)
2016	América FC	7	(1)
2016	AEZ Zakakiou	1	(0)
2017	Água Santa	12	(3)
2017–2018	Noroeste	11	(0)
2019–	Capivariano	11	(2)
- * Club domestic league appearances and goals as of 14 January 2018

Luiz Fernando Borges Romão (born 31 July 1989), simply Romão, is a Brazilian professional footballer who plays as a forward.

== Career ==
Born in Jaú, Romão began his career on XV de Jaú, and went on to play for a host of clubs. In May 2013, he signed a contract with Série A outfit Portuguesa., and made his top flight debut on 25 May, in a 1–0 defeat against Vasco, as a starter.
