= Valdomiro (footballer, born 1979) =

Brazilian footballer

Personal information
- Full name: Valdomiro Duarte de Macedo
- Date of birth: 6 December 1979 (age 46)
- Place of birth: Salvador, Brazil
- Height: 1.92 m (6 ft 4 in)
- Position: Centre back

Youth career
- 1996–1998: Bahia

Senior career*
Years	Team	Apps	(Gls)
1998–2003	Bahia	56	(7)
2004	Flamengo	5	(0)
2005	Santo André		
2006	Palmeiras	0	(0)
2006–2007	União Leiria	8	(0)
2007–2009	Trofense	56	(8)
2009	Al Wasl	15	(2)
2010	Vitória Guimarães	14	(4)
2010–2011	Vitória Setúbal	20	(1)
2011–2012	Samsunspor	4	(0)
2012–2015	Portuguesa	106	(6)
2016	J. Malucelli	23	(1)
2017	Anápolis	10	(1)
- * Club domestic league appearances and goals

Valdomiro Duarte de Macedo (born 6 December 1979), known simply as Valdomiro, is a Brazilian retired footballer who played as a central defender.

== Club career ==
Born in Salvador, Bahia, Valdomiro was promoted to Esporte Clube Bahia's first team in 1998, but only made his senior debuts two years later. After appearing regularly in the 2003 season, he moved to Clube de Regatas do Flamengo in the following year.

Valdomiro made his debut for Mengão on 27 October 2004, in a 1–1 home draw against Santos FC. However, he only played five matches during the campaign, and was subsequently released.

On 28 December 2005, after a year at Esporte Clube Santo André, Valdomiro signed for Sociedade Esportiva Palmeiras. On 21 July 2006, after only featuring for the latter in Campeonato Paulista, he agreed to a two-year deal with Primeira Liga club U.D. Leiria.

In the 2007 summer, Valdomiro joined fellow league team C.D. Trofense after being deemed surplus to requirements by União. Two years later, after appearing regularly, he moved to UAE Arabian Gulf League side Al-Wasl FC.

On 30 December 2009, Valdomiro returned to Portugal, signing an 18-month contract with Vitória de Guimarães. On 27 August of the following year he joined another club in the country and its top flight, Vitória de Setúbal.

In the summer of 2011, Valdomiro switched teams and countries again, signing for Turkish Süper Lig's Samsunspor. He only totalled 226 minutes of action during his spell, and was subsequently released.

In May 2012, Valdomiro joined Associação Portuguesa de Desportos. He suffered two consecutive relegations with the club, also being sidelined with a serious knee injury during the latter season.

On 1 May 2015, Valdomiro left Lusa after not having his contract renewed.

== Honours ==
Portuguesa

- Campeonato Paulista Série A2: 2013
