= Marcelo Cordeiro =

Brazilian footballer (born 1981)

Personal information
- Full name: Marcelo Cordeiro de Souza
- Date of birth: 4 December 1981 (age 44)
- Place of birth: Niterói, Brazil
- Height: 1.75 m (5 ft 9 in)
- Position: Left-back

Team information
- Current team: Guarani (assistant)

Youth career
- 2001: Vasco da Gama

Senior career*
| Years | Team | Apps | (Gls) |
| 2001 | Vasco da Gama | | |
| 2002 | Rio Claro | | |
| 2002 | Bragantino | | |
| 2003–2006 | Democrata-SL | | |
| 2006 | Villa Rio | | |
| 2007 | Botafogo-SP | | |
| 2007 | Caxias | | |
| 2008 | Atlético Sorocaba | ? | (12) |
| 2008 | Vitória | 33 | (5) |
| 2009–2011 | Internacional | 28 | (2) |
| 2010 | → Botafogo (loan) | 44 | (7) |
| 2011 | → Portuguesa (loan) | 52 | (6) |
| 2012–2013 | Portuguesa | 52 | (6) |
| 2013–2014 | Sport Recife | 31 | (2) |
| 2014 | Metropolitano | 8 | (1) |
| 2015 | São Bento | 13 | (3) |
| 2015 | Red Bull Brasil | 7 | (0) |
| 2016 | São Bento | 16 | (5) |
| 2016 | Vila Nova | 28 | (1) |
| 2017–2019 | São Bento | 61 | (7) |

Managerial career
- 2019–2021: São Bento (assistant)
- 2019: São Bento (interim)
- 2021: São Bento (interim)
- 2022–2023: São Bento U17
- 2024: Real Soccer U17
- 2024–: Guarani (assistant)
- 2024: Guarani (interim)
- 2024: Guarani (interim)
- 2025: Guarani (interim)
- * Club domestic league appearances and goals

Marcelo Cordeiro de Souza (born 4 December 1981), known as Marcelo Cordeiro or simply Cordeiro, is a Brazilian football coach and former player who played as a left back. He is the current assistant coach of Guarani.

== Club career ==
Born in Niterói, Rio de Janeiro, Cordeiro graduated with Vasco da Gama's youth setup, but left in the following year after the club's financial troubles. He subsequently resumed his career in the lower levels.

In 2008, after scoring 12 goals for Atlético Sorocaba, Cordeiro joined Vitória. He made his first team – and Série A – debut on 10 May, starting in a 0–2 home loss against Cruzeiro.

Cordeiro scored his first professional goals on 9 July, netting a brace in a 5–2 home routing over Botafogo. He appeared in 33 matches and scored five goals, and moved to Internacional on 9 January 2009.

Cordeiro was subsequently loaned to Botafogo and Portuguesa, and signed permanently with the latter in November 2011. He was an ever-present figure with Lusa, appearing in more than 100 matches for the club.

On 25 April 2013, Cordeiro joined Sport Recife. He was released on 30 May of the following year, and signed for Metropolitano on 4 August.

Cordeiro moved to São Bento for the 2015 season, and subsequently represented Red Bull Brasil before returning to his previous club. On 6 May 2016, he was presented at Vila Nova.

On 29 November 2016, Cordeiro returned to São Bento for his third spell. On 3 July 2019, he announced his retirement at the age of 38.

== Coaching career ==
Immediately after retiring, Cordeiro became an assistant coach of his last club São Bento. He was an interim head coach on two occasions before leaving the club on 17 May 2021.

Cordeiro returned to Bentão in 2022, but as coach of the under-17 squad. He moved to Real Soccer under the same role for the 2024 season, before joining Guarani on 29 April of that year.

== Honours ==
Internacional

- Campeonato Gaúcho: 2009
- Copa Suruga Bank: 2009

Botafogo

- Campeonato Carioca: 2010

Portuguesa

- Campeonato Brasileiro Série B: 2011
