= Michel Douglas =

Brazilian footballer

Personal information
- Full name: Michel Douglas Guedes
- Date of birth: 16 January 1992 (age 34)
- Place of birth: Santa Luzia, Brazil
- Height: 1.86 m (6 ft 1 in)
- Position: Forward

Team information
- Current team: ASA

Youth career
- Portuguesa

Senior career*
Years	Team	Apps	(Gls)
2013	Portuguesa	12	(2)
2014	Atlético Sorocaba	11	(1)
2014	Boa Esporte	4	(1)
2015	Villa Nova	9	(1)
2016	Tupi	4	(0)
2017	Brusque	17	(4)
2017–2018	CSA	43	(15)
2018–2019	Desportivo Aves	5	(0)
2019	→ Vila Nova (loan)	13	(0)
2019	→ Guarani (loan)	24	(5)
2020	CSA	12	(2)
2020	Botafogo-SP	8	(1)
2021	Boavista	13	(5)
2021–2022	Novorizontino	17	(4)
2023	Santa Cruz	6	(2)
2024	Real Brasília	13	(3)
2025	EC Pelotas	6	(0)
2026	Esportiva	16	(4)
2026–	ASA	12	(7)
- * Club domestic league appearances and goals as of 19 November 2026

Michel Douglas Guedes (born 16 January 1992), known as Michel Douglas, is a Brazilian footballer who plays as a forward for ASA.

== Career ==
Born in Santa Luzia, Minas Gerais, Michel Douglas graduated from Portuguesa's youth system, and made his senior debut on 23 January, against Monte Azul. and made his top flight debut on 2 June, in a 2-2 draw against Náutico, as a starter; Michel also scored the tying goal.

== Honours ==
CSA

- Campeonato Brasileiro Série C: 2017
