= 2014 Associação Portuguesa de Desportos season =

Portuguesa
2014 season
- President: Ilídio Lico
- Coach: Zé Augusto (caretaker)
- Stadium: Canindé
- Série B: 20th place (relegated)
- Campeonato Paulista: 12th place
- Copa do Brasil: First round
Home colours	Away colours	Third colours

The 2014 season is Associação Portuguesa de Desportos' ninety third season in existence and the club's first consecutive season in the second level of Brazilian football.

== Managers rotation ==
Only in a year, Portuguesa had five full-time managers (Guto Ferreira, Argel Fucks, Marcelo Veiga, Silas and Vágner Benazzi) and also one caretaker (Zé Augusto). All but the latter were sacked due to poor results.

== Players ==
=== Squad information ===
As of 23 November 2014

Name	Pos.	Nat.	Place of birth	Date of birth (age)	Club caps	Club goals	Signed from	Date signed	Fee	Contract End
Goalkeepers
Glédson	GK	(Brazil)	Almenara (Minas Gerais)	6 February 1983 (aged 31)	58	0	Boa Esporte	30 April 2012	Free	31 December 2015
Douglas Lima	GK	(Brazil)	Salvador (Bahia)	26 August 1992 (aged 22)	0	0	Youth System	6 January 2012	Free	31 May 2015
Rafael Santos	GK	(Brazil)	Barretos (São Paulo (state))	14 March 1989 (aged 25)	27	0	Icasa	7 July 2014	Free	31 December 2015
Tom	GK	(Brazil)	Aracaju (Sergipe)	30 October 1991 (aged 23)	12	0	Youth System	1 January 2011	Free	31 December 2015
Defenders
André Astorga	CB	(Brazil)	Santa Fé (Paraná (state))	7 January 1980 (aged 34)	6	0	Bragantino	18 September 2014	Free	17 December 2014
Brinner	CB/DM	(Brazil)	Lavras (Minas Gerais)	16 July 1987 (aged 27)	21	0	Paraná	17 June 2014	Loan	30 November 2014
Cassius	CB	(Brazil)	Campo Grande (Mato Grosso do Sul)	15 June 1995 (aged 19)	–	–	Youth System	1 July 2014	Free	30 November 2016
Diego Augusto	CB	(Brazil)	São Paulo (São Paulo (state))	17 May 1991 (aged 23)	36	1	Youth System	1 August 2010	Free	1 February 2015
Gustavo Tabalipa	CB	(Brazil)	Rolim de Moura (Rondônia)	28 January 1993 (aged 21)	11	0	Youth System	1 August 2013	Free	2 December 2015
Luan Peres	CB/LB	(Brazil)	São Caetano do Sul (São Paulo (state))	19 July 1994 (aged 20)	–	–	Youth System	2 September 2014	Free	28 February 2017
Luciano Castán	CB	(Brazil)	São Paulo (São Paulo (state))	13 September 1989 (aged 25)	23	1	São Bernardo	2 May 2014	Free	8 December 2014
Mateus Honorio	CB/LB	(Brazil)	Pedregulho (São Paulo (state))	16 June 1983 (aged 31)	12	0	Inter de Limeira	25 September 2014	Free	15 December 2014
Rafael Pérez	CB	(Colombia)	Cartagena	9 January 1990 (aged 24)	2	0	Santa Fe (Colombia)	26 May 2014	Free	31 December 2016
Valdomiro (c)	CB	(Brazil)	Salvador (Bahia)	6 December 1979 (aged 34)	93	5	Samsunspor (Turkey)	22 May 2012	Free	30 April 2015
Alê	RB	(Brazil)	Monte Sião (Minas Gerais)	11 August 1992 (aged 22)	2	0	Youth System	1 June 2012	Free	31 January 2015
Arnaldo	RB	(Brazil)	Uberaba (Minas Gerais)	15 April 1992 (aged 22)	24	0	Mirassol	21 April 2014	Loan	10 December 2014
Bruno Ferreira	RB	(Brazil)	São Paulo (São Paulo (state))	14 September 1994 (aged 20)	6	1	Youth System	27 October 2014	Free	31 December 2014
Jean Mota	LB/AM	(Brazil)	São Paulo (São Paulo (state))	15 October 1993 (aged 21)	46	1	Youth System	1 May 2012	Free	31 May 2015
Lucas Caires	LB	(Brazil)	São Paulo (São Paulo (state))	29 June 1992 (aged 22)	2	0	União Barbarense	19 September 2014	Free	21 December 2014
Nerylon	RB	(Brazil)	São Luís (Maranhão)	15 January 1988 (aged 26)	1	0	Monte Azul	1 October 2014	Free	21 December 2014
Midfielders
Dejair	DM/CB	(Brazil)	Contagem (Minas Gerais)	30 November 1994 (aged 19)	7	0	Youth System	1 April 2013	Free	31 December 2014
Diego Silva	DM	(Brazil)	Bento de Abreu (São Paulo (state))	9 May 1989 (aged 25)	13	0	XV de Piracicaba	8 January 2014	Loan	31 December 2014
Diogo Orlando	DM	(Brazil)	Volta Redonda (Rio de Janeiro (state))	3 December 1983 (aged 30)	11	0	Santo André	18 September 2014	Free	15 December 2014
Gabriel Modesto	DM	(Brazil)	Cândido Mota (São Paulo (state))	29 July 1993 (aged 21)	–	–	Naval (Portugal)	7 August 2014	Free	30 May 2015
Maycon	CM/AM	(Brazil)	Vitória (Espírito Santo)	14 February 1985 (aged 29)	18	1	São José-RS	14 February 2014	Free	31 December 2014
Bruno Piñatares	DM/CB	(Uruguay)	Montevideo	25 June 1990 (aged 24)	14	0	Rentistas (Uruguay)	11 July 2014	Free	31 January 2016
Renan	DM/CM	(Brazil)	São Paulo (São Paulo (state))	15 February 1995 (aged 19)	33	1	Youth System	1 August 2013	Free	4 January 2016
Rudnei	DM	(Brazil)	Florianópolis (Santa Catarina (state))	7 October 1984 (aged 30)	16	1	Alania (Russia)	17 January 2014	Free	31 December 2014
Daniel Bacan	AM	(Brazil)	Mairinque (São Paulo (state))	14 August 1993 (aged 21)	–	–	Naval (Portugal)	7 August 2014	Free	30 May 2015
Dinélson	AM	(Brazil)	Anagé (Bahia)	4 February 1986 (aged 28)	3	0	RB Brasil	30 July 2014	Free	30 November 2014
Djalma	AM	(Brazil)	Januária (Minas Gerais)	15 April 1988 (aged 26)	4	1	São Paulo-RS	15 August 2014	Free	30 November 2014
Felipe Nunes	AM	(Brazil)	Gama (Federal District (Brazil))	20 May 1990 (aged 24)	10	0	Grêmio	17 January 2014	Loan	31 December 2014
Fran	AM	(Brazil)	São Paulo (São Paulo (state))	5 May 1992 (aged 22)	1	0	Grêmio Osasco	7 July 2014	Free	31 May 2015
Gabriel Xavier	AM	(Brazil)	São Paulo (São Paulo (state))	15 July 1993 (aged 21)	42	6	Youth System	1 August 2013	Free	30 April 2016
Júnior Alves	AM	(Brazil)	Buritis (Minas Gerais)	20 March 1994 (aged 20)	9	0	Academy	11 August 2014	Free	28 February 2017
Léo Costa	AM	(Brazil)	São José dos Campos (São Paulo (state))	3 March 1986 (aged 28)	13	1	Vitória	18 September 2014	Free	31 December 2015
Marcus Vinicius	AM	(Brazil)	São Bernardo do Campo (São Paulo (state))	18 March 1997 (aged 17)	–	–	Corinthians	25 August 2014	Loan	31 May 2015
Matheus	AM	(Brazil)	São Paulo (São Paulo (state))	22 March 1996 (aged 18)	9	1	Youth System	1 September 2014	Free	30 November 2015
Forwards
Alemão	ST	(Brazil)	Valinhos (São Paulo (state))	2 March 1989 (aged 25)	8	1	Ponte Preta	15 August 2014	Loan	31 December 2014
Bryan Aldave	ST	(Uruguay)	Montevideo	29 September 1983 (aged 31)	7	0	Nacional Potosí (Bolivia)	30 May 2014	Free	31 December 2016
Bruno Moraes	ST	(Brazil)	Santos (São Paulo (state))	7 July 1984 (aged 30)	4	0	Gil Vicente (Portugal)	26 September 2014	Free	21 December 2014
Caio	ST	(Brazil)	Presidente Prudente (São Paulo (state))	22 September 1992 (aged 22)	19	2	Palmeiras	8 January 2014	Loan	15 December 2014
Jânio	ST	(Brazil)	Parnaíba (Piauí)	3 July 1991 (aged 23)	7	1	Criciúma	7 July 2014	Loan	30 November 2014
Jô Fernandes	SS/ST	(Brazil)	São Caetano do Sul (São Paulo (state))	16 January 1992 (aged 22)	–	–	São Caetano	26 September 2014	Free	30 September 2015
Luan	SS/ST	(Brazil)	São Paulo (São Paulo (state))	14 January 1996 (aged 18)	16	1	Youth System	1 February 2013	Free	17 January 2016
Marcelinho	SS/ST	(Brazil)	Suzano (São Paulo (state))	23 May 1994 (aged 20)	16	0	Youth System	18 April 2014	Free	31 December 2015
Pedro Oldoni	ST	(Brazil)	Pato Branco (Paraná (state))	26 September 1985 (aged 29)	2	0	Sivasspor (Turkey)	19 June 2014	Free	20 December 2015
Serginho	ST/SS	(Brazil)	Avaré (São Paulo (state))	19 December 1984 (aged 29)	23	4	Mogi Mirim	14 May 2014	Free	10 December 2014
Thiago Brito	ST/SS	(Brazil)	Eldorado dos Carajás (Pará)	20 August 1992 (aged 22)	2	0	Grêmio Barueri	22 September 2014	Free	18 December 2014

=== Appearances and goals ===
Pos.	Nat	Name	Brasileiro Série B		Campeonato Paulista		Copa do Brasil		Total	
Pos.	Nat	Name	Apps	Goals	Apps	Goals	Apps	Goals	Apps	Goals
GK	(Brazil)	Glédson	4	0	13	0	2	0	19	0
GK	(Brazil)	Douglas Lima	0	0	0	0	0	0	0	0
GK	(Brazil)	Rafael Santos	27	0	0	0	0	0	27	0
GK	(Brazil)	Tom	6	0	2+1	0	0	0	9	0
DF	(Brazil)	André Astorga	5+1	0	0	0	0	0	6	0
DF	(Brazil)	Brinner	21	0	0	0	0	0	21	0
DF	(Brazil)	Cassius	0	0	0	0	0	0	0	0
DF	(Brazil)	Diego Augusto	8	0	13	0	1	0	22	0
DF	(Brazil)	Gustavo Tabalipa	4+2	0	3+1	0	0	0	10	0
DF	(Brazil)	Luan Peres	0	0	0	0	0	0	0	0
DF	(Brazil)	Luciano Castán	21+2	1	0	0	0	0	23	1
DF	(Brazil)	Mateus Honorio	11+1	0	0	0	0	0	12	0
DF	(Colombia)	Rafael Pérez	2	0	0	0	0	0	2	0
DF	(Brazil)	Valdomiro	1	0	5	0	0	0	6	0
DF	(Brazil)	Alê	0	0	0	0	0	0	0	0
DF	(Brazil)	Arnaldo	23+1	0	0	0	0	0	24	0
DF	(Brazil)	Bruno Ferreira	6	1	0	0	0	0	6	1
DF	(Brazil)	Jean Mota	12+6	1	1+1	0	0+2	0	22	1
DF	(Brazil)	Lucas Caires	1+1	0	0	0	0	0	2	0
DF	(Brazil)	Nerylon	0+1	0	0	0	0	0	1	0
MF	(Brazil)	Dejair	3	0	0+2	0	0	0	5	0
MF	(Brazil)	Diogo Orlando	9+2	0	0	0	0	0	11	0
MF	(Brazil)	Diego Silva	2+1	0	7+3	0	0	0	13	0
MF	(Brazil)	Gabriel Modesto	0	0	0	0	0	0	0	0
MF	(Brazil)	Maycon	12+4	1	0+1	0	0+1	0	18	1
MF	(Uruguay)	Bruno Piñatares	13+1	0	0	0	0	0	14	0
MF	(Brazil)	Renan	15+2	1	13+1	0	0	0	31	1
MF	(Brazil)	Rudnei	9+1	1	3+1	0	2	0	16	1
MF	(Brazil)	Daniel Bacan	0	0	0	0	0	0	0	0
MF	(Brazil)	Dinélson	2+1	0	0	0	0	0	3	0
MF	(Brazil)	Djalma	3+1	1	0	0	0	0	4	1
MF	(Brazil)	Felipe Nunes	7+1	0	1+1	0	0	0	10	0
MF	(Brazil)	Fran	1	0	0	0	0	0	1	0
MF	(Brazil)	Gabriel Xavier	26+3	4	1+9	2	2	0	41	6
MF	(Brazil)	Júnior Alves	1+8	0	0	0	0	0	9	0
MF	(Brazil)	Léo Costa	8+5	1	0	0	0	0	13	1
MF	(Brazil)	Marcus Vinicius	0	0	0	0	0	0	0	0
MF	(Brazil)	Matheus	3+6	1	0	0	0	0	9	1
FW	(Brazil)	Alemão	7+1	1	0	0	0	0	8	1
FW	(Uruguay)	Bryan Aldave	2+5	0	0	0	0	0	7	0
FW	(Brazil)	Bruno Moraes	2+2	0	0	0	0	0	4	0
FW	(Brazil)	Caio	5+6	0	2+4	2	2	0	19	2
FW	(Brazil)	Jânio	5+2	1	0	0	0	0	7	1
FW	(Brazil)	Jô Fernandes	0	0	0	0	0	0	0	0
FW	(Brazil)	Luan	6+3	1	0+1	0	0+2	0	12	1
FW	(Brazil)	Marcelinho	4+10	0	0	0	0	0	14	0
FW	(Brazil)	Pedro Oldoni	2	0	0	0	0	0	2	0
FW	(Brazil)	Serginho	17+6	4	0	0	0	0	23	4
FW	(Brazil)	Thiago Brito	0+2	0	0	0	0	0	2	0
Players who left the club during the season
GK	(Brazil)	Michel	0	0	0	0	0	0	0	0
DF	(Brazil)	André Vinicius	0	0	1	0	0	0	1	0
DF	(Brazil)	Lacerda	0	0	0	0	0	0	0	0
DF	(Brazil)	Wágner	8	0	5	0	2	0	15	0
DF	(Brazil)	Bryan	0	0	14	0	2	0	16	0
DF	(Brazil)	Eduardo	6	0	0	0	0	0	6	0
DF	(Brazil)	Ivan	0	0	0	0	0	0	0	0
DF	(Brazil)	Jussandro	4	0	0	0	0	0	4	0
DF	(Brazil)	Régis	11+2	0	14	0	1	0	28	0
DF	(Brazil)	Tony	0	0	1+2	0	0	0	3	0
MF	(Brazil)	Bruninho	0	0	2+1	0	0	0	3	0
MF	(Brazil)	Coutinho	8	1	4+3	0	2	0	17	1
MF	(Brazil)	Gomes	0	0	1	0	0	0	1	0
MF	(Brazil)	Jocinei	17	1	0	0	0	0	17	1
MF	(Brazil)	Willian Magrão	0	0	9+1	2	2	0	12	2
MF	(Brazil)	Allan Dias	21+1	4	0	0	0	0	22	4
MF	(Brazil)	Carlos Alberto	0	0	1	0	0	0	1	0
MF	(Brazil)	Douglas Washington	0	0	0	0	0	0	0	0
MF	(Brazil)	Henrique	0	0	0	0	0	0	0	0
MF	(Brazil)	Giovanni	0	0	3+1	1	0	0	4	1
MF	(Brazil)	Rondinelly	0+4	0	7+3	2	2	0	16	2
MF	(Brazil)	Wanderson	0	0	13	3	0	0	13	3
FW	(Brazil)	Caion	3+2	0	0	0	0	0	5	0
FW	(Brazil)	Diego Viana	0	0	0	0	0	0	0	0
FW	(Brazil)	Henrique Silva	0	0	14	7	0	0	14	7
FW	(Brazil)	Laércio	1+4	0	0+5	0	1+1	1	12	1
FW	(Brazil)	Leandro	0	0	11+1	3	0	0	12	3
FW	(Brazil)	Romão	4+1	2	0	0	0	0	5	2
FW	(Brazil)	Vander	2	0	1+2	0	1	1	6	1
FW	(Brazil)	Wéverton	2+2	0	0	0	0	0	4	0

Last updated: 29 November 2014
Source: Match reports in Competitive matches, Soccerway

=== Goalscorers ===
Ran	Pos	Nat	Name	Série B	Paulistão	Copa do Brasil	Total
1	FW	(Brazil)	Henrique Silva	0	7	0	7
2	MF	(Brazil)	Gabriel Xavier	4	2	0	6
3	MF	(Brazil)	Allan Dias	4	0	0	4
3	FW	(Brazil)	Serginho	4	0	0	4
4	MF	(Brazil)	Wanderson	0	3	0	3
4	FW	(Brazil)	Leandro	0	3	0	3
5	FW	(Brazil)	Romão	2	0	0	2
5	MF	(Brazil)	Rondinelly	0	2	0	2
5	MF	(Brazil)	Willian Magrão	0	2	0	2
5	FW	(Brazil)	Caio	0	2	0	2
6	DF	(Brazil)	Bruno Ferreira	1	0	0	1
6	DF	(Brazil)	Jean Mota	1	0	0	1
6	DF	(Brazil)	Luciano Castan	1	0	0	1
6	MF	(Brazil)	Coutinho	1	0	0	1
6	MF	(Brazil)	Djalma	1	0	0	1
6	MF	(Brazil)	Jocinei	1	0	0	1
6	MF	(Brazil)	Matheus	1	0	0	1
6	MF	(Brazil)	Renan	1	0	0	1
6	MF	(Brazil)	Rudnei	1	0	0	1
6	MF	(Brazil)	Léo Costa	1	0	0	1
6	MF	(Brazil)	Maycon	1	0	0	1
6	FW	(Brazil)	Alemão	1	0	0	1
6	FW	(Brazil)	Jânio	1	0	0	1
6	FW	(Brazil)	Luan	1	0	0	1
6	MF	(Brazil)	Giovanni	0	1	0	1
6	FW	(Brazil)	Laércio	0	0	1	1
6	FW	(Brazil)	Vander	0	0	1	1
	Own goals			0	1	0	1
Total				26	23	2	51

Last updated: 29 November 2014
Source: Match reports in Competitive matches

=== Disciplinary record ===
N	Pos.	Nat.	Name	Yellow card	Second yellow card	Red card	Notes
	MF	(Brazil)	Renan	8			
	FW	(Brazil)	Serginho	8			
	DF	(Brazil)	Diego Augusto	7	1		
	MF	(Brazil)	Gabriel Xavier	7			
	DF	(Brazil)	Brinner	6	1		
	DF	(Brazil)	Luciano Castán	6			
	MF	(Uruguay)	Bruno Piñatares	6			
	MF	(Brazil)	Rudnei	5		1	
	MF	(Brazil)	Diogo Orlando	4	1		
	MF	(Brazil)	Maycon	4			
	GK	(Brazil)	Gledson	3			
	GK	(Brazil)	Rafael Santos	3			
	MF	(Brazil)	Jean Mota	3			
	FW	(Brazil)	Alemão	3			
	FW	(Brazil)	Luan	3			
	DF	(Brazil)	André Astorga	2	1		
	GK	(Brazil)	Tom	2			
	DF	(Brazil)	Arnaldo	2			
	DF	(Brazil)	Gustavo Tabalipa	2			
	DF	(Brazil)	Mateus Honorio	2			
	MF	(Brazil)	Diego Silva	2			
	MF	(Brazil)	Léo Costa	2			
	FW	(Brazil)	Caio	2			
	DF	(Brazil)	Nerylon			1	
	DF	(Colombia)	Rafael Pérez	1			
	DF	(Brazil)	Valdomiro	1			
	MF	(Brazil)	Dejair	1			
	MF	(Brazil)	Djalma	1			
	FW	(Brazil)	Marcelinho	1			
	DF	(Brazil)	Wágner	7	1		
	DF	(Brazil)	Régis	6			
	MF	(Brazil)	Allan Dias	6			
	MF	(Brazil)	Coutinho	5			
	FW	(Brazil)	Henrique Silva	4			
	MF	(Brazil)	Wanderson	4			
	MF	(Brazil)	Willian Magrão	4			
	DF	(Brazil)	Bryan	3	1		
	DF	(Brazil)	Eduardo	3			
	MF	(Brazil)	Rondinelly	2			
	FW	(Brazil)	Laércio	2			
	MF	(Brazil)	Giovanni	1		1	
	DF	(Brazil)	Jussandro	1	1		
	DF	(Brazil)	Tony	1			
	MF	(Brazil)	Bruninho	1			
	MF	(Brazil)	Gomes	1			
	MF	(Brazil)	Jocinei	1			
	FW	(Brazil)	Caion	1			
	FW	(Brazil)	Vander	1			

Last updated: 29 November 2014
Source: Match reports in Competitive matches
Only competitive matches
(yellow card) = Number of bookings; (second yellow card) = Number of sending offs after a second yellow card; (red card) = Number of sending offs by a direct red card.

=== Injuries ===
Date	Pos.	Name	Injury	Note	Recovery time	Source
2 February 2014	DF	Valdomiro	Knee strain	During match	Undisclosed	LusaNews
9 February 2014	GK	Glédson	Thigh injury	During match	7 days	Estadão
25 February 2014	MF	Willian Magrão	Thigh injury	During training	2 weeks	Lance!
9 April 2014	FW	Caio	Groin injury	During match	Undisclosed	Globo Esporte
18 April 2014	MF	Rondinelly	Ankle injury	During training	3 weeks	Globo Esporte
22 April 2014	DF	Diego Augusto	Knee injury	During training	Undisclosed	Globo Esporte

== Transfers ==
=== In ===
Pos.	Name	Age	Moving from	Type	Fee	Source
DF	(Brazil) André Vinicius	22	Corinthians	Loan	Free	
MF	(Brazil) Diego Silva	24	XV de Piracicaba	Loan	Free	
MF	(Brazil) Rondinelly	22	Grêmio	Loan	Free	
FW	(Brazil) Caio	21	Palmeiras	Loan	Free	
MF	(Brazil) Giovanni	19	Corinthians	Loan	Free	
MF	(Brazil) Gomes	20	Corinthians	Loan	Free	
FW	(Brazil) Vander	23	Vitória	Loan	Free	
FW	(Brazil) Leandro	22	Icasa	Transfer	Free	
DF	(Brazil) Régis	24	Ponte Preta	Transfer	Free	
MF	(Brazil) Rudnei	29	(Russia) Alania	Transfer	Free	
DF	(Brazil) Tony	24	Grêmio	Loan	Free	
MF	(Brazil) Willian Magrão	26	Grêmio	Transfer	Free	
MF	(Brazil) Felipe Nunes	23	Grêmio	Loan	Free	
MAN	(Brazil) Argel Fucks	39	Free agent	Job Offer	Free	
MF	(Brazil) Coutinho	29	Linense	Transfer	Free	
MF	(Brazil) Maycon	29	São José-RS	Transfer	Free	
FW	(Brazil) Laércio	24	Tombense	Transfer	Free	
DF	(Brazil) Wágner	24	São Caetano	Transfer	Free	
DF	(Brazil) Arnaldo	22	Mirassol	Loan	Free	
DF	(Brazil) Eduardo	25	São Bernardo	Transfer	Free	
FW	(Brazil) Caion	23	Audax São Paulo	Transfer	Free	
MF	(Brazil) Allan Dias	25	Red Bull Brasil	Loan	Free	
DF	(Brazil) Luciano Castán	24	São Bernardo	Transfer	Free	
FW	(Brazil) Serginho	29	Mogi Mirim	Transfer	Free	
MAN	(Brazil) Marcelo Veiga	49	Bragantino	Job Offer	Free	
DF	(Colombia) Rafael Pérez	24	(Colombia) Independiente Santa Fe	Transfer	Free	
FW	(Uruguay) Bryan Aldave	30	(Bolivia) Nacional Potosí	Transfer	Free	
DF	(Brazil) Brinner	26	Paraná (originally on loan from Botafogo)	Loan	Free	
MF	(Brazil) Wéverton	22	América-MG	Transfer	Free	
FW	(Brazil) Pedro Oldoni	28	(Turkey) Sivasspor	Loan	Free	
DF	(Brazil) Jussandro	22	Bahia	Transfer	Free	
MF	(Brazil) Marcos Assunção	37	Figueirense	Transfer	Free	
MF	(Brazil) Jocinei	24	Corinthians	Loan	Free	
GK	(Brazil) Rafael Santos	25	São Caetano	Transfer	Free	
MF	(Uruguay) Bruno Piñatares	24	(Uruguay) Rentistas	Transfer	Free	
MF	(Brazil) Fran	22	Grêmio Osasco Audax	Transfer	Free	
MF	(Brazil) Dinélson	28	Red Bull Brasil	Transfer	Free	
MAN	(Brazil) Silas	48	Free agent	Job Offer	Free	
FW	(Brazil) Jânio	23	Criciúma	Loan	Free	
MF	(Brazil) Djalma	26	Jacuipense	Transfer	Free	
FW	(Brazil) Alemão	25	Ponte Preta	Loan	Free	
MF	(Brazil) Gabriel Modesto	21	(Portugal) Naval	Transfer	Free	
MF	(Brazil) Daniel Bacan	21	(Portugal) Naval	Transfer	Free	
MF	(Brazil) Marcus Vinicius	17	Corinthians	Loan	Free	
MAN	(Brazil) Vágner Benazzi	60	Guarani	Job Offer	Free	
MF	(Brazil) Diogo Orlando	30	Santo André	Transfer	Free	
DF	(Brazil) André Astorga	33	Bragantino	Transfer	Free	
MF	(Brazil) Léo Costa	28	Vitória	Transfer	Free	
FW	(Brazil) Thiago Brito	22	Grêmio Barueri	Transfer	Free	
DF	(Brazil) Mateus	31	Inter de Limeira	Transfer	Free	
FW	(Brazil) Jô Fernandes	22	São Caetano	Transfer	Free	
FW	(Brazil) Bruno Moraes	30	(Portugal) Gil Vicente	Transfer	Free	
DF	(Brazil) Nerylon	26	Monte Azul	Transfer	Free	
DF	(Brazil) Lucas Caires	22	União Barbarense	Transfer	Free	

Total spending: ▼ R$0

=== Out ===
Pos.	Name	Age	Moving to	Type	Fee	Source
DF	(Brazil) Luis Ricardo	29	São Paulo	Transfer	R$1.3 M	
FW	(Brazil) Gilberto (on loan from Internacional)	24	(Canada) Toronto FC	Transfer	R$5.8 M (Note: Portuguesa did not receive any fee for the transfer)	
MF	(Brazil) Muralha	20	Flamengo	Loan return	Free	
MF	(Brazil) Souza	34	Ceará	End of contract	Free	
GK	(Brazil) Lauro	33	Internacional	Loan Return	Free	
DF	(Brazil) Magal	26	Ponte Preta	Released	Free	
DF	(Brazil) Lucas Silva	26	ABC	Released	Free	
DF	(Brazil) Moisés Moura	34	Free agent	Released	Free	
DF	(Brazil) Lima	28	Botafogo-SP	Released	Free	
DF	(Brazil) Rogério	29	Criciúma	Released	Free	
MF	(Brazil) Bruno Henrique (on loan from Londrina)	24	Corinthians	Transfer	Undisclosed (Note: Portuguesa did not receive any fee for the transfer)	
MF	(Brazil) Matheus	24	Free agent	Released	Free	
MF	(Brazil) Corrêa	33	Fortaleza	Released	Free	
FW	(Brazil) Diogo	26	Palmeiras	Transfer	Free	
FW	(Brazil) Bergson	22	Grêmio	Loan Return	Free	
MF	(Brazil) Moisés	25	(Croatia) Rijeka	Transfer	Free	
MF	(Brazil) Ferdinando	33	(Japan) Jubilo Iwata	Transfer	Free	
FW	(Brazil) Michel	22	Atlético Sorocaba	Released	Free	
MF	(Brazil) Carlos Alberto	25	Atlético-PR	Loan return	Free	
MAN	(Brazil) Guto Ferreira	48	Free agent	Resigned	Free	
DF	(Brazil) Lacerda	29	Paysandu	Transfer	Free	
DF	(Brazil) Ivan	21	Coritiba	Transfer	Free	
MF	(Brazil) Bruninho	21	Palmeiras	Contract Rescinded	Free	
MF	(Brazil) Douglas Washington	25	São Luiz-RS	Transfer	Free	
DF	(Brazil) André Vinicius	22	Corinthians	Loan Return	Free	
MF	(Brazil) Giovanni	19	Corinthians	Loan Return	Free	
MF	(Brazil) Gomes	20	Corinthians	Loan Return	Free	
MF	(Brazil) Henrique	23	Paraná	Transfer	Free	
MF	(Brazil) Wanderson	26	(Bulgaria) Ludogorets Razgrad	Transfer	Undisclosed	
FW	(Brazil) Henrique	24	Palmeiras	Loan Ended	Free	
FW	(Brazil) Leandro	22	Chapecoense	Transfer	Free	
DF	(Brazil) Bryan	22	América-MG	Loan Ended	Free	
DF	(Brazil) Tony	24	Grêmio	Loan Ended	Free	
MF	(Brazil) Willian Magrão	27	Free Agent	Released	Free	
FW	(Brazil) Vander	24	Vitória	Loan Ended	Free	
MAN	(Brazil) Argel Fucks	39	Free agent	Resigned	Free	
FW	(Brazil) Caion	23	Mirassol	Loan Ended	Free	
FW	(Brazil) Laércio	24	Free Agent	Released	Free	
FW	(Brazil) Romão	24	Capivariano	Loan Ended	Free	
MF	(Brazil) Rondinelly	23	Grêmio	Loan Ended	Free	
MF	(Brazil) Coutinho	30	Free Agent	Released	Free	
DF	(Brazil) Wágner	24	Free Agent	Released	Free	
DF	(Brazil) Eduardo	25	América-MG	Released	Free	
GK	(Brazil) Michel	19	Free Agent	Released	Free	
MAN	(Brazil) Marcelo Veiga	49	Free Agent	Released	Free	
MF	(Brazil) Marcos Assunção	38	Free Agent	Contract Terminated	Free	
MAN	(Brazil) Silas	48	Free Agent	Released	Free	
DF	(Brazil) Jussandro	22	Chapecoense	Contract Terminated	Free	
DF	(Brazil) Régis	25	Botafogo	Contract Terminated	Free	
MAN	(Brazil) Vagner Benazzi	60	Free Agent	Released	Free	
MF	(Brazil) Jocinei	24	Corinthians	Loan Return	Free	
MF	(Brazil) Allan Dias	26	Free Agent	Contract Terminated	Free	
MF	(Brazil) Wéverton	22	Free Agent	Released	Free	

Total gaining: ▲ R$1,300,000

== Competitions ==
=== Campeonato Paulista ===
Pos	Team	Pld	W	D	L	GF	GA	GD	Pts
1	Santos	15	11	3	1	39	16	+23	36
2	Ponte Preta	15	8	0	7	17	23	−6	24
3	São Bernardo	15	6	5	4	23	18	+5	23
4	Portuguesa	15	6	2	7	23	19	+4	20
5	Paulista	15	0	4	11	14	31	−17	4

Source: Globo Esporte

==== Matches ====
19 January 1	Portuguesa	1 – 2	Corinthians	São Paulo
17:00 UTC-02:00	Diego Silva (yellow card) 29'; Henrique 45+2'	Report	Romarinho 34'; Guilherme 40'	Stadium: Canindé; Attendance: 8,278; Referee: Guilherme Ceretta de Lima

22 January 2	Ituano	0 – 0	Portuguesa	Itu
17:00 UTC-02:00	Airton (yellow card) 64'	Report	Gomes (yellow card) 26'; Bruninho (yellow card) 41'; Diego Augusto (yellow card) 68'; Valdomiro (yellow card) 71'; Giovanni (yellow card) 86'	Stadium: Novelli Júnior; Attendance: 783; Referee: Luiz Vanderlei Martinucho

25 January 3	XV de Piracicaba	1 – 0	Portuguesa	Piracicaba
17:00 UTC-02:00	Rodolfo (yellow card) 46'; Danilo Sacramento 68' (red card) 71'	Report		Stadium: Barão da Serra Negra; Attendance: 2,191; Referee: Aurélio Sant'Anna Martins

29 January 4	Portuguesa	1 – 2	Botafogo-SP	São Paulo
19:30 UTC-02:00	Giovanni 20'; Willian Magrão (yellow card) 25'	Report	Mike 22'; Augusto Ramos (yellow card) 27'; César Gaúcho (yellow card) 31'; Daniel Borges (yellow card) 74'; Marcelo Macedo 81'	Stadium: Canindé; Attendance: 969; Referee: Raphael Claus

2 February 5	Audax	4 – 2	Portuguesa	Osasco
10:00 UTC-02:00	Velicka 3', 37'; Denilson (yellow card) 32'; Camacho 35'; Thiago Silvy 57'	Report	Renan (yellow card) 29'; Henrique 30', 45' (pen.); Wanderson (yellow card) 51'; Giovanni (red card) 51'; Gledson (yellow card) 63'; Willian Magrão (yellow card) 77'	Stadium: José Liberatti; Attendance: 952; Referee: Leandro Bizzio Marinho

5 February 6	Atlético Sorocaba	1 – 3	Portuguesa	Sorocaba
19:30 UTC-02:00	Fabão (yellow card) 40'; Lima (yellow card) 55'; Montoya (yellow card) 64'; Danilo 68'	Report	Henrique (yellow card) 4' (goal) 67', 78'; Diego Augusto (yellow card) 13' (yellow-red card) 80'; Willian Magrão 53'; Renan (yellow card) 70'	Stadium: CIC Walter Ribeiro; Attendance: 1,083; Referee: Fábio de Jesus Volpato Mendes

9 February 7	Portuguesa	4 – 0	Linense	São Paulo
19:30 UTC-02:00	Henrique 22'; Willian Magrão 28'; Gustavo Tabalipa (yellow card) 35'; Leandro 45+2'; Rondinelly (yellow card) 63'; Wanderson 86'	Report	Murilo Silva (yellow card) 43'; Rodriguinho (yellow card) 45+1'; Thiago Santos (yellow card) 71'; Tobi (yellow card) 90+1'	Stadium: Canindé; Attendance: 1,070; Referee: Robério Pereira Pires

15 February 8	São Paulo	0 – 0	Portuguesa	São Paulo
21:00 UTC-02:00	Wellington (yellow card) 30'	Report	Renan (yellow card) 36'; Tom (yellow card) 65'; Diego Augusto (yellow card) 81'	Stadium: Morumbi; Attendance: 9,754; Referee: Flávio Rodrigues Guerra

19 February 9	Penapolense	2 – 1	Portuguesa	Penápolis
19:30 UTC-03:00	Douglas Tanque 4'; Liel 65'; Rodrigo Biro (yellow card) 66'; Heleno (yellow card) 86'	Report	Coutinho (yellow card) 16'; Luiz Gustavo 43' (o.g.); Régis (yellow card) 64'; Wanderson (yellow card) 67'; Rudnei (yellow card) 86' (red card) 90+3'; Henrique (yellow card) 88'	Stadium: Tenente Carriço; Attendance: 2,058; Referee: Marcelo Prieto Alfieri

23 February 10	Portuguesa	2 – 1	Comercial	São Paulo
18:30 UTC-03:00	Henrique 63'; Gabriel Xavier 77'	Report	Marcone (yellow card) 41'; Edson 53' (yellow card) 72'	Stadium: Canindé; Attendance: 1,263; Referee: Welton Orlando Wohnrath

26 February 11	Portuguesa	2 – 0	Mogi Mirim	São Paulo
19:30 UTC-02:00	Leandro 15'; Wanderson (yellow card) 27' (goal) 80'; Glédson (yellow card) 77'; Tony (yellow card) 85'; Wágner (yellow card) 90+3'	Report	Elanardo (yellow card) 41'; Fábio Sanches (yellow card) 75'; Mirita (yellow card) 81'	Stadium: Canindé; Attendance: 817; Referee: Flávio Rodrigues de Souza

6 March 12	Palmeiras	1 – 0	Portuguesa	São Paulo
19:30 UTC-02:00	Eguren (yellow card) 14'; Juninho 48' (yellow card) 89'; Lúcio (yellow card) 57'	Report	(yellow card) 49' Henrique; (yellow card) 55' Rondinelly; (yellow card) 61' Willian Magrão; (yellow card) 67' Renan	Stadium: Pacaembu; Attendance: 9,984; Referee: Vinicius Furlan

12 March 13	Portuguesa	3 – 1	Bragantino	São Paulo
15:00 UTC-02:00	Caio 27' 89'; Wágner (yellow card) 35'; Régis (yellow card) 36'; Wanderson (yellow card) 51' (goal) 85'; Renan (yellow card) 54'	Report	(yellow card) 13' Geandro; (yellow card) 25' Alexandre; (yellow card) 26' (goal) 61' Robertinho; (yellow card) 80' Cesinha	Stadium: Canindé; Attendance: 778; Referee: Leandro Bizzio Marinho
Note: Match originally started on 11 March but was suspended in the 45th minute due to heavy rain.

18 March 14	Oeste	1 – 0	Portuguesa	Itápolis
19:30 UTC-02:00	Artur (yellow card) 32'; João Denoni 38'	Report	(yellow card) 27' Caio; (yellow card) 74' (red card) 90+3' Bryan; (yellow card) 79' Wágner; (yellow card) 90+2' Willian Magrão	Stadium: Estádio dos Amaros; Attendance: 697; Referee: Alessandro Darcie

23 March 15	Portuguesa	4 – 3	Rio Claro	São Paulo
16:00 UTC-02:00	Gabriel Xavier 27'; Rondinelly 33' 41'; Leandro 65'; Henrique (yellow card) 90+3'; Régis (yellow card) 90+4'	ReportReport	21' Wendell; (yellow card) 32' Patrik Silva; (yellow card) 40' Cléber Alves; 68' Thiago Cristian; 77' Caio	Stadium: Canindé; Attendance: 740; Referee: Luiz Vanderlei Martinucho

=== Copa do Brasil ===
2 April 1st Round	Potiguar Mossoró	1 – 0	Portuguesa	Mossoró
19:30 UTC-02:00	Reginaldo Júnior 11'; Ramón (yellow card) 26'; Daniel Rezende (yellow card) 75'	Report	(yellow card) 19' Rudnei; (yellow card) 66' Luan; (yellow card) 78' Bryan	Stadium: Nogueirão; Attendance: 1,351; Referee: Gilberto Rodrigues Castro Júnior

9 April 1st Round	Portuguesa	2 – 1	Potiguar Mossoró	São Paulo
19:30 UTC-02:00	Gabriel Xavier (yellow card) 6'; Laércio 35'; Vander 65'; Wágner (yellow card) 66' (red card) 90+1'; Bryan (yellow card) 72'	Report	25' Reginaldo Júnior; (yellow card) 38' (red card) 66' Berg; (yellow card) 68' Michael; (yellow card) 70' Danilo Fidelis	Stadium: Canindé; Attendance: 1,132; Referee: João Batista de Arruda

- Potiguar progressed through the away goal system.

=== Campeonato Brasileiro ===
==== League table ====
Pos	Team	Pld	W	D	L	GF	GA	GD	Pts	Promotion or relegation
16	Bragantino	38	13	7	18	45	55	−10	46	
17	América-RN (R)	38	12	7	19	44	53	−9	43	Relegation to 2015 Série C
18	Icasa (R)	38	11	10	17	34	43	−9	43	Relegation to 2015 Série C
19	Vila Nova (R)	38	10	2	26	35	70	−35	32	Relegation to 2015 Série C
20	Portuguesa (R)	38	4	13	21	29	59	−30	25	Relegation to 2015 Série C

Updated to match(es) played on 15 November 2014. Source: CBF
Rules for classification: 1st points; 2nd wins; 3rd goal difference; 4th goals scored; 5th head-to-head results; 6th least red cards received; 7th least yellow cards received; 8th draw.
(R) Relegated

==== Matches ====
2 April 1	Joinville	3 – 0	Portuguesa	Joinville
19:30 UTC-02:00		Report; Report		Stadium: Arena Joinville; Attendance: 7,295; Referee: Marcos André Gomes da Penha
Note: Match suspended in the 16th minute due to a lawsuit won by a Portuguesa supporter which allows Lusa a place in Série A (later the same lawsuit was declared void). Weeks later, a win was given to Joinville due to Portuguesa's match disbandment, according to STJD.

26 April 2	Portuguesa	1 – 1	Santa Cruz	São Paulo
16:20 UTC-02:00	Régis (yellow card) 43'; Diego Silva (yellow card) 55'; Eduardo (yellow card) 60'; Rudnei 63' (yellow card) 79'	Report	(yellow card) 40' Oziel; 68' Caça-Rato	Stadium: Canindé; Attendance: 1,367; Referee: Rodrigo Baptista Raposo

29 April 3	Bragantino	2 – 2	Portuguesa	Bragança Paulista
21:50 UTC-02:00	Guilherme Mattis (yellow card) 1'; Fabiano (yellow card) 29'; Gustavo Campanharo 66'; Dejair 90+3' (o.g.)	Report	(yellow card) 15' Wágner; (yellow card) 44' Dejair; (yellow card) 69' (goal) 90' Coutinho; (yellow card) 73' Vander; 84' Romão	Stadium: Nabi Abi Chedid; Attendance: 696; Referee: Leandro Bizzio Marinho

6 May 2014 4	Boa Esporte	2 – 1	Portuguesa	Varginha
21:50 UTC-02:00	Marcão (yellow card) 23'; Pedrinho 45+1'; Moisés Ribeiro (yellow card) 48'; Thiago Carvalho (yellow card) 85'; Fernando Caranga (yellow card) 88'; Nilson 90+4'	Report	(yellow card) 40' Coutinho; 85' (yellow card) 89' Allan Dias; (yellow card) 90+3' Laércio	Stadium: Melão; Attendance: 570; Referee: Paulo Ramón Gonçalves Pinheiro

17 May 2014 5	Portuguesa	1 – 2	América-RN	São Paulo
16:20 UTC-02:00	Coutinho (yellow card) 21'; Rudnei (yellow card) 31'; Allan Dias 51'; Arnaldo (yellow card) 60'; Caio (yellow card) 71'; Eduardo (yellow card) 86'	Report	(yellow card) 80' Wanderson; 90' Rodrigo Pimpão; 90+4' Daniel Costa	Stadium: Canindé; Attendance: 1,250; Referee: Wagner Reway

20 May 2014 6	Náutico	2 – 1	Portuguesa	Pernambuco
21:50 UTC-02:00	Alessandro (yellow card) 6'; Marcelinho (yellow card) 34'; Willian Alves 58' (yellow card) 70'; Vinícius 88'	Report	7' (pen.) Romão; (yellow card) 49' Gledson; (yellow card) 65' Eduardo; (yellow card) 66' Serginho	Stadium: Arena Pernambuco; Attendance: 3,054; Referee: Claudio Francisco Lima e Silva

24 May 2014 7	Portuguesa	2 – 0	Atlético-GO	São Paulo
16:20 UTC-02:00	Allan Dias 51' (yellow card) 88'; Coutinho (yellow card) 56'; Renan 83'	Report		Stadium: Canindé; Attendance: 538; Referee: Valdicleuson Silva da Costa

28 May 2014 8	Portuguesa	1 – 4	Sampaio Corrêa	São Paulo
19:30 UTC-02:00	Luciano Castán (yellow card) 9'; Wágner (yellow card) 64'; Laércio (yellow card) 77'; Serginho 82' (pen.)	Report	3' Uillian; 30' Pimentinha; (yellow card) 37' (red card) 81' Hilton; 47' Márcio Diogo; 84' Edgar	Stadium: Canindé; Attendance: 792; Referee: Bruno Rezende

31 May 2014 9	Vasco	1 – 1	Portuguesa	Volta Redonda
16:20	Marlon (yellow card) 9'; Rodrigo 14'; Edmilson (yellow card) 16'; Guilherme Biteco (yellow card) 57'; Diego Renan (yellow card) 81'	Report	30' Gabriel Xavier; (yellow card) 49' Caion; (yellow card) 51' Rudnei; (yellow card) 80' Serginho	Stadium: Raulino de Oliveira; Attendance: 2,835; Referee: André Luiz de Freitas Castro

3 June 2014 10	Portuguesa	2 – 1	América-MG	São Paulo
19:30 UTC-02:00	Serginho 42' (pen.); Wágner (yellow card) 70'; Luciano Castán (yellow card) 87'; Maycon 90+4'	Report	(yellow card) 31' Ricardinho; (yellow card) 43' Carlos Renato; 51' Mancini	Stadium: Canindé; Attendance: 645; Referee: Nielson Nogueira Dias

16 July 2014 11	Ponte Preta	0 – 0	Portuguesa	Campinas
19:30	Bryan (yellow card) 28'; Tiago Alves (yellow card) 41'; Alef (yellow card) 45'	Report	(yellow card) 28' Maycon; (yellow card) 88' (red card) 90+1' Jussandro; (yellow card) 90+1' Gustavo Tabalipa	Stadium: Moisés Lucarelli; Attendance: 5,048; Referee: Vinicius Furlan

18 July 2014 12	Portuguesa	1 – 1	Paraná	São Paulo
19:30 UTC-02:00	Luciano Castán (yellow card) 42'; Allan Dias (yellow card) 74'; Serginho 90+3' (yellow card) 90+4'	Report	(yellow card) 23' Gustavo; 43' Lúcio Flávio; (yellow card) 57' Marcos Serrato; (yellow card) 83' Arthur	Stadium: Canindé; Attendance: 961; Referee: Charles Hebert Cavalcante Ferreira

22 July 2014 13	Icasa	2 – 0	Portuguesa	Juazeiro do Norte
19:30	Jonatan (yellow card) 67'; Foguinho 86'; Núbio Flávio 90'	Report	(yellow card) 62' Rafael Pérez; (yellow card) 75' Marcelinho	Stadium: Romeirão; Attendance: 1,473; Referee: Arilson Bispo da Anunciação

29 July 2014 14	Portuguesa	0 – 0	Oeste	São Paulo
21:00	Diego Augusto (yellow card) 54'; Allan Dias (yellow card) 79'	Report	(yellow card) 11' Díonísio; (yellow card) 73' Everton Dias	Stadium: Canindé; Attendance: 804; Referee: Guilherme Ceretta de Lima

5 August 2014 15	Luverdense	3 – 1	Portuguesa	Lucas do Rio Verde
19:30	Braga (yellow card) 58'; Washington 69'; Jean Patrick 72'; Rubinho 75'; Carlão (yellow card) 82'	Report	59' Jocinei; (yellow card) 71' Jean Mota; (yellow card) 82' Serginho	Stadium: Passo das Emas; Attendance: 1,622; Referee: Pablo dos Santos Alves

12 August 2014 16	ABC	0 – 0	Portuguesa	Natal
19:30		Report	(yellow card) 41' Jean Mota; (yellow card) 68' Diego Augusto; (yellow card) 88' Brinner	Stadium: Arena das Dunas; Attendance: 4,822; Referee: Gilberto Rodrigues Castro Junior

19 August 2014 17	Portuguesa	1 – 3	Avaí	São Paulo
21:50	Serginho (yellow card) 57'; Djalma 85'; Régis (yellow card) 88'	Report	(yellow card) 23' (goal) 75' Diego Felipe; (yellow card) 30' Antônio Carlos; (yellow card) 74' Marquinhos; 86' Revson; 90+1' Roberto	Stadium: Canindé; Attendance: 728; Referee: Edmar Campos da Encarnação

23 August 2014 18	Portuguesa	1 – 1	Ceará	São Paulo
16:10	Piñatares (yellow card) 30'; Alemão 42' (pen.)	Report	(yellow card) 40' Sandro; 59' Magno Alves; (yellow card) 90+3' Bill	Stadium: Canindé; Attendance: 1,695; Referee: Grazianni Maciel Rocha

26 August 2014 19	Vila Nova	1 – 2	Portuguesa	Goiânia
21:50	Gustavo 79'	Report	52' 90+3' (yellow card) 90+3' Gabriel Xavier; (yellow card) 70' Djalma	Stadium: Serra Dourada; Attendance: 15,469; Referee: Manoel Nunes Lopo Garrido

2 September 2014 20	Portuguesa	1 – 2	Joinville	São Paulo
20:30	Serginho (yellow card) 60'; Allan Dias 65' (yellow card) 66'; Alemão (yellow card) 89'; Rafael Santos (yellow card) 90+1'	Report	16' Jael; (yellow card) 61' Anselmo; (yellow card) 82' Bruno Aguiar; 90+1' Fabinho	Stadium: Canindé; Attendance: 1,051; Referee: Emerson Luiz Sobral

9 September 2014 21	Santa Cruz	1 – 0	Portuguesa	Recife
19:30	Renan Fonseca (yellow card) 79'; Léo Gamalho 88'	Report	(yellow card) 71' Luciano Castan	Stadium: Arruda; Attendance: 9,107; Referee: Antonio Denival de Morais

13 September 2014 22	Portuguesa	1 – 3	Bragantino	São Paulo
21:00	Jean Mota (yellow card) 38'; Serginho (yellow card) 43'; Gabriel Xavier (yellow card) 46' (goal) 52'; Diego Augusto (yellow card) 74'; Piñatares (yellow card) 85'	Report	5' Robertinho; 9' Tobi; (yellow card) 68' Marcos Paulo; (yellow card) 74' Magno Cruz; 81' Cesinha	Stadium: Canindé; Attendance: 742; Referee: Rodrigo D'Alonso Ferreira

16 September 2014 23	Portuguesa	1 – 1	Boa Esporte	São Paulo
19:30	Serginho (yellow card) 45+1'; Brinner (yellow card) 45+2'; Jocinei (yellow card) 57'; Gabriel Xavier (yellow card) 57'; Luciano Castan 90'	Report	(yellow card) 38' Thiago Carvalho; (yellow card) 59' Fernando Karanga; 83' Morato	Stadium: Canindé; Attendance: 881; Referee: Wágner do Nascimento Magalhães

19 September 2014 24	América-RN	1 – 1	Portuguesa	Natal
19:30	Paulinho 67'; Andrey (yellow card) 90'	Report	(yellow card) 14' Allan Dias; (yellow card) 27' Régis; (yellow card) 42' Arnaldo; (yellow card) 52' Maycon; 90+2' Jean Mota	Stadium: Arena das Dunas; Attendance: 3,767; Referee: Péricles Bassols Pegado Cortez

23 September 2014 25	Portuguesa	0 – 0	Náutico	São Paulo
21:50	Alemão (yellow card) 56'	Report	(yellow card) 65' Cañete; (yellow card) 79' Vinicius; (yellow card) 90' Rafael Cruz	Stadium: Canindé; Attendance: 1,215; Referee: Braulio da Silva Machado

27 September 2014 26	Atlético-GO	2 – 1	Portuguesa	Goiânia
21:00	Márcio 43' (pen.); André Luís 54' (yellow card) 62'; Juninho (yellow card) 79'; Diogo Goiano (yellow card) 82'; Willian Arão (yellow card) 84'	Report	(yellow card) 41' (red card) 62' Brinner; 45+2' (pen.) Jânio; (yellow card) 66' Alemão; (yellow card) 68' Luciano Castan; (yellow card) 83' Léo Costa; (yellow card) 85' Rafael Santos	Stadium: Serra Dourada; Attendance: 633; Referee: Francisco de Assis de Almeida Filho

30 September 2014 27	Sampaio Corrêa	0 – 0	Portuguesa	São Luís
19:30		Report	(yellow card) 71' Mateus Honorio; (yellow card) 75' Diogo Orlando; (yellow card) 83' André Astorga	Stadium: Castelão; Attendance: 15,604; Referee: Paulo Henrique de Godoy Bezerra

7 October 2014 28	Portuguesa	0 – 1	Vasco	São Paulo
21:50	Mateus Honorio (yellow card) 25'; Renan (yellow card) 69'	Report	(yellow card) 36' Douglas Silva; 38' Douglas; (yellow card) 56' Guiñazú	Stadium: Canindé; Attendance: 2,888; Referee: Arilson Bispo da Anunciação

11 October 2014 29	América-MG	3 – 1	Portuguesa	Independência
16:10	Tchô 5'; Gilson 28'; Willians (yellow card) 45+2'; Obina 90'	Report	(yellow card) 18' Léo Costa; (yellow card) 64' Diogo Orlando; 86' Serginho	Stadium: Belo Horizonte; Attendance: 2,896; Referee: Edmar Campos da Encarnação

17 October 2014 30	Portuguesa	0 – 3	Ponte Preta	São Paulo
19:30	Diogo Orlando (yellow card) 45+1' (red card) 70'; Maycon (yellow card) 87'	Report	(yellow card) 45+1' Adrianinho; 54' Rafael Costa; (yellow card) 63' Jonathan Cafu; (yellow card) 75' Juninho; 84' 90' Alexandro	Stadium: Canindé; Attendance: 1,848; Referee: Marcelo Prieto Alfieri

21 October 2014 31	Paraná	1 – 0	Portuguesa	Vila Capanema
19:30	Jean (yellow card) 47'; Adailton 61'; Carlinhos (yellow card) 64'	Report	(yellow card) 15' Gabriel Xavier; (yellow card) 85' Brinner; (yellow card) 88' Piñatares	Stadium: Curitiba; Attendance: 1,851; Referee: Arnoldo Vasconcelos Figarela

24 October 2014 32	Portuguesa	1 – 2	Icasa	São Paulo
19:30	Léo Costa 18' (pen.); Diego Augusto (yellow card) 25'; Luan (yellow card) 45+6'; André Astorga (yellow card) 72' (red card) 74'; Nerylon (red card) 78'	Report	3' Naylhor; 9' Ivonaldo; (yellow card) 17' Mauri; (yellow card) 44' Roger; (yellow card) 65' Eric	Stadium: Canindé; Attendance: 453; Referee: Rafael Traci

28 October 2014 33	Oeste	3 – 0	Portuguesa	Dos Amaros
19:30	Dênis Neves 34' (pen.); Reis (yellow card) 37' (goal) 57'; Cristiano 68'	Report	(yellow card) 37' Piñatares	Stadium: Itápolis; Attendance: 357; Referee: Flávio Rodrigues Guerra

8 October 2014 34	Portuguesa	1 – 0	Luverdense	São Paulo
21:00	Piñatares (yellow card) 38'; Luan 51'; Gabriel Xavier (yellow card) 87'	Report	(yellow card) 68' Montoya	Stadium: Canindé; Attendance: 361; Referee: Eduardo Cordeiro Guimarães

11 October 2014 35	Portuguesa	0 – 0	ABC	São Paulo
19:30		Report		Stadium: Canindé; Attendance: 374; Referee: Wágner dos Santos Rosa

18 November 2014 36	Avaí	2 – 0	Portuguesa	Ressacada
19:30	Antônio Carlos (yellow card) 79'; Marquinhos 80'; Anderson Lopes 89' (yellow card) 90'	Report	(yellow card) 22' Gabriel Xavier; (yellow card) 36' Piñatares; (yellow card) 62' Maycon	Stadium: Florianópolis; Attendance: 3,233; Referee: Paulo Henrique de Melo Salmazio

22 November 2014 37	Ceará	2 – 1	Portuguesa	Castelão
21:00	Sandro 9'; Brinner 64' (o.g.)	Report	62' Matheus; (yellow card) 65' Luciano Castán; (yellow card) 75' Rafael Santos	Stadium: Fortaleza; Attendance: 7,081; Referee: Renan Roberto de Souza

28 November 2014 38	Portuguesa	3 – 2	Vila Nova	São Paulo
19:30	Bruno Ferreira 8'; Renan (yellow card) 27'; Tom (yellow card) 32'; Júlio Vinicius 60' (o.g.); Brinner (yellow card) 86'	Report	33' (pen.) Paulinho; (yellow card) 29' (goal) 35' Mateus Anderson; (yellow card) 55' Victor Melo; (yellow card) 64' Júlio Vinicius; 63' (yellow card) 86' Felipe Macena; (yellow card) 70' Leonardo	Stadium: Canindé; Attendance: 307; Referee: Leonardo Sigari
