= Augusto (disambiguation) =

Augusto is a given name and surname. It may also refer to:

- Augusto (Naples Metro), an underground metro station that serves Line 6 on the Naples Metro
- Augusto (footballer, born 1985), Brazilian footballer
- Augusto (footballer, born 1987), Portuguese footballer
- Augusto (footballer, born 1992), Brazilian footballer
- Augusto (footballer, born 1997), Brazilian footballer
- Augusto (futsal player), Brazilian-born Azerbaijani futsal player

== See also ==
- Zé Augusto (disambiguation), the nickname of three footballers
