= Dejair =

Dejair is a given name. It may refer to:

- Dejair (footballer, born 1977), Dejair Jorge Ferreira, Brazilian football midfielder
- Dejair (footballer, born 1994), Dejair Igor Silvério Ribeiro, Brazilian football defensive midfielder

== See also ==
- Djair (disambiguation)
