= Gledson =

Gledson is a name. It may refer to:

- David Gledson (1877-1949), Australian accountant and member of the Queensland Legislative Assembly
- Gledson (footballer, born 1979), Gledson da Silva Menezes, Brazilian football defender
- Glédson (footballer, born 1983), Glédson Ribeiro dos Santos, Brazilian football goalkeeper
