= 2015 Persiba Balikpapan season =

Persiba Balikpapan
2015 season
- Chairman: Syahril HM Taher
- Head Coach: Edi Simon Badawi
- Stadium: Persiba Stadium
- Indonesian Super League: TBD

== Matches ==
=== Legend ===
Win Draw Loss Postponed

== Statistics ==
=== Squad ===
As of December 2014.

No.	Pos	Nat	Player	Total		Indonesia Super League	
No.	Pos	Nat	Player	Apps	Goals	Apps	Goals
2	DF	(Indonesia) IDN	Noorhidayat	0	0	0	0
7	MF	(Indonesia) IDN	Arifki Eka Putra	0	0	0	0
8	MF	(Indonesia) IDN	Johan Juansyah	0	0	0	0
9	FW	(Indonesia) IDN	I Made Wirahadi	0	0	0	0
10	FW	(Uruguay) URU	Bryan Aldave	0	0	0	0
11	FW	(Indonesia) IDN	Fengky Turnado	0	0	0	0
13	MF	(Indonesia) IDN	Bayu Pradana	0	0	0	0
15	DF	(Indonesia) IDN	Joko Sidik	0	0	0	0
17	MF	(Indonesia) IDN	Hendri Satriadi	0	0	0	0
19	DF	(Indonesia) IDN	Valentino Telaubun	0	0	0	0
20	GK	(Indonesia) IDN	I Ngurah Komang Arya	0	0	0	0
24	DF	(Indonesia) IDN	Ledi Utomo	0	0	0	0
27	FW	(Indonesia) IDN	Miftahul Hamdi	0	0	0	0
29	MF	(Indonesia) IDN	M Solechudin	0	0	0	0
32	DF	(Indonesia) IDN	Absor Fauzi	0	0	0	0
34	DF	(Indonesia) IDN	Ahmad Taufik	0	0	0	0
36	DF	(Indonesia) IDN	Rizal Lestaluhu	0	0	0	0
69	DF	(Indonesia) IDN	Febly Gushendra	0	0	0	0
77	MF	(Indonesia) IDN	Rahel Radiansyah	0	0	0	0
78	GK	(Indonesia) IDN	Dwi Yudha P	0	0	0	0
87	DF	(Indonesia) IDN	Yudi Khoerudin	0	0	0	0
88	FW	(Indonesia) IDN	Suheri Daud	0	0	0	0
89	MF	(Indonesia) IDN	Bryan Cesar	0	0	0	0
	FW	(Indonesia) IDN	Jumansyah	0	0	0	0
	DF	(Indonesia) IDN	Muhammad Faisal Mahmud	0	0	0	0
	DF	(Slovakia) SVK	Roman Golian	0	0	0	0
	MF	(Brazil) BRA	Antonio Teles	0	0	0	0

== Transfers ==
=== In ===
No.	Pos.	Name	Moving from	Type	Sources
	DF	(Indonesia) Febly Gushendra	Free agent	Released	
	FW	(Indonesia) Miftahul Hamdi	(Indonesia) Persiraja Banda Aceh	Released	
	FW	(Indonesia) Jumansyah	Free agent	Released	
	DF	(Indonesia) Muhammad Faisal Mahmud	Free agent	Released	
	MF	(Indonesia) Bryan Cesar Ramadhan	Free agent	Released	
	FW	(Uruguay) Bryan Aldave	(Brazil) Portuguesa	Released	
	DF	(Slovakia) Roman Golian	(Indonesia) Persela Lamongan	Released	
	MF	(Brazil) Antonio Teles	(Indonesia) Persepar Palangkaraya	Released	

=== Out ===
No.	Pos.	Name	Moving to	Type	Sources
	DF	(Indonesia) Fandy Mochtar	(Indonesia) Pusamania Borneo FC	Released	
	GK	(Indonesia) Wawan Hendrawan	(Indonesia) Mitra Kukar FC	Released	
