= Diogo Orlando =

Brazilian footballer (born 1983)

Personal information
- Full name: Diogo Orlando de Oliveira
- Date of birth: 4 December 1983 (age 42)
- Place of birth: Volta Redonda, Brazil
- Height: 1.79 m (5 ft 10 1/2 in)
- Position: Defensive midfielder

Team information
- Current team: Sampaio Corrêa

Youth career
- Volta Redonda

Senior career*
Years	Team	Apps	(Gls)
2002–2005	Volta Redonda		
2005–2009	Jaguaré		
2006	→ Vitória (loan)		
2007	→ Americano (loan)		
2008	→ Mirassol (loan)		
2009	→ São Caetano (loan)		
2010–2011	Mirassol		
2010–2011	→ Avaí (loan)		
2012–2013	Avaí		
2013	→ Ceará (loan)		
2014	Santo André		
2014–2015	Portuguesa		
2015–2016	Gostaresh		
2016	Santo André		
2016	Itabaiana		
2016	Sampaio Corrêa		
2017	Santo André		
2018–	URT		
- * Club domestic league appearances and goals as of 5 November 2016

Orlando Diogo de Oliveira, commonly known as Diogo Orlando (born December 4, 1983), is a Brazilian footballer who plays for Sampaio Corrêa as a defensive midfielder.

== Career statistics ==
(Correct as of November 29, 2014)

Club	Season	State League		National League		Copa do Brasil		CONMEBOL		Other		Total	
Club	Season	Apps	Goals	Apps	Goals	Apps	Goals	Apps	Goals	Apps	Goals	Apps	Goals
São Caetano	2009	12	0	12	0	—		—		—		24	0
Avaí	2010	—		18	0	—		2	0	—		20	0
Avaí	2011	12	0	20	1	5	0	—		—		37	1
Avaí	2012	15	1	18	0	—		—		—		33	1
Avaí	Total	27	1	56	1	5	0	2	0	—		90	2
Ceará	2013	14	0	20	1	1	0	—		5	0	30	1
Santo André	2014	9	0	0	0	—		—		—		9	0
Portuguesa	2014	—		11	0	—		—		—		11	0
Career total		62	1	99	1	6	0	2	0	5	0	174	2

== Honours ==
Volta Redonda

- Campeonato Carioca Série B: 2004

Vitória

- Campeonato Capixaba: 2006

Jaguaré

- Copa Espírito Santo: 2007

Avaí

- Campeonato Catarinense: 2012

Ceará

- Campeonato Cearense: 2013

Santo André

- Campeonato Paulista Série A2: 2016
