= Zé Augusto =

Zé Augusto may refer to:

- Zé Augusto (footballer, born 1959), Brazilian football attacking midfielder and coach José Augusto Borges Nascimento
- Zé Augusto (footballer, born 1968), Mozambican football defender José Augusto Dlofo
- Zé Augusto (footballer, born 1978), Brazilian football midfielder Jose Augusto Freitas Sousa
