= Jô (footballer, born 1992) =

Brazilian footballer

Personal information
- Full name: Jonatas Figueira Fernandes
- Date of birth: 16 January 1992 (age 34)
- Place of birth: São Caetano do Sul, Brazil
- Height: 1.92 m (6 ft 3 1/2 in)
- Position: Striker

Youth career
- 2008–2011: Corinthians

Senior career*
Years	Team	Apps	(Gls)
2011	Corinthians	0	(0)
2011	Grêmio	0	(0)
2012–2018	São Caetano	32	(19)
2014	→ Portuguesa (loan)	0	(0)
Total		32	(19)
- * Club domestic league appearances and goals

Jonatas Figueira Fernandes (born 16 January 1992), known simply as Jô or Jô Fernandes, is a Brazilian retired footballer who played as a striker.

Jô started his career with Corinthians, progressing through their youth system. He was the team's top scorer in the 2011 Copa São Paulo de Futebol Júnior. Although he was considered one of the club's top prospects, Jô had a series of disciplinary problems in his early career, which caused him to quit professional football in 2012. He had a short stint playing futsal in 2013, and in 2015, Jô made his return to association football. He was the 2015 Campeonato Brasileiro Série D top scorer and led his hometown club São Caetano to the quarterfinals. Following a number of successive knee injuries which kept him out of the 2017 season, he retired in February 2018.

== Early life ==
Jô was born in São Caetano do Sul, São Paulo, to Marisa Figueira and Mário Fernandes. He regularly played football in the streets of the Olímpico neighbourhood, and during his childhood, he lived close to Estádio Anacleto Campanella. Jô was a fan of his hometown club, and used to watch over cars in order to get money to buy São Caetano tickets.

He began playing futsal at SERC Santa Maria. At age six, he joined Corinthians' youth futsal teams. After scoring eight goals in a futsal match, at the request of youth coach Zé Augusto, Jô made the switch to association football, joining Corinthians' under-17 team. In 2008, at the age of 16, he signed his first professional contract with Timão.

== Club career ==
=== Corinthians ===
Jô scored five goals in the 2009 U-17 Campeonato Paulista, and in September 2009, he extended his contract with Corinthians until 30 October 2011. He was also the club's top scorer in the 2010 U-20 Campeonato Paulista. Jô was part of the squad that played in the 2011 Copa São Paulo de Futebol Júnior. He led the team in scoring with four goals in four matches during the tournament but couldn't help Timão get past the round of 32. Nevertheless, his play impressed first-team manager Tite, who called him up to the senior squad on 18 January 2011, two days after the U-20 side was eliminated from Copa São Paulo, losing to Desportivo Brasil. He was expected to be the future replacement of star striker Ronaldo.

Jô was our bet, but he's been having problems since his youth squad days, and also in practice sessions with us. He has to rethink his behavior. That's the first step. If he doesn't change, things will get difficult.

— Tite, Jô's manager at Corinthians in February 2011

While in the youth ranks of Corinthians, Jô was already infamous for his disciplinary problems. He missed several appointments without giving any explanation and regularly went out clubbing and drinking. He also had a strained relationship with club doctor Joaquim Grava, as well as with club director Afonso Harmonia, who said of Jô: "He's a 19-year-old boy with a BMW X1. If he would ride a bus to practice [...] The problem with him is the excess of vodka."

Before a Campeonato Paulista match against São Bernardo. After Grava ruled him out of the game due to a meniscus injury on his right knee, Jô insisted on playing and had a quarrel with the club doctor. After the argument, Jô was absent from the team's training sessions for a few days and asked to be released by the club.

=== Grêmio ===
On 8 June 2011, Jô signed a four-year deal with Grêmio, the same club that his older brother Mário Fernandes was playing for. Grêmio director César Cidade Dias, aware of Jô's disciplinary problems and injury history, said of him: "We know all about Jô's past, but we also know that he's a good kid and he's very talented. Here, it's a new life, we'll try and I'm sure we'll make an exceptional player out of him." He was expected to play in the club's under-20 team.

However, Jô failed to make a single appearance for the Tricolor Gaúcho due to an ankle injury, and returned to Corinthians two months later.

=== São Caetano ===
On 27 February 2012, Jô signed with Série B side São Caetano. His professional debut was postponed due to another knee injury. Jô made his debut for his hometown club on 1 September 2012, coming off the bench in the 64th minute, replacing Vandinho in a 1–0 home win against Avaí for the Série B. On 24 November 2012, he came off the bench in the 46th minute during a 2–1 win over Guarani at Brinco de Ouro.

For the 2013 season, Jô gave up on playing football, instead choosing to join São Caetano's futsal team, while still under contract with Azulão. On 25 September 2014, Jô was loaned to Portuguesa for one year. He did not play in a single match for the club due to injuries. He also had a trial with Russian club CSKA Moscow in 2014, but did not sign a contract due to his long-term absence from professional football.

After his hiatus from professional football, Jô returned to São Caetano for the 2015 season. Weighing over 100 kg, he wasn't included in the squad that played in the 2015 Campeonato Paulista Série A2, but kept training with the first team, getting in shape to play in the 2015 Série D. On 12 July 2015, head coach Luís Carlos Martins put Jô in the starting lineup for São Caetano's first Série D match. Fourteen minutes into the match, Jô scored his first ever senior-level goal, following a Robson Fernandes assist. He would score again five minutes later, leading his team to a 5–0 home victory over Lajeadense. On 3 August, Jô opened the scoring with two goals in a 3–2 away win against Metropolitano. Two weeks later, he netted another brace against the same opponent, this time at Anacleto Campanella. He repeated the feat in the next two matches, reaching four consecutive Série D games in which he scored a brace.

With his disciplinary problems now in the past, Jô returned to his best form, scoring 11 goals in the eight matches of the Série D first stage. In the first leg of the round of 16 fixture against Coruripe, Jô netted his 12th goal of the season as Azulão defeated the home side 3–0. Although São Caetano failed to achieve promotion and were eliminated by eventual champions Botafogo de Ribeirão Preto in the quarterfinals, the club had the best offensive record in Série D, with 26 goals scored, and Jô finished as the league's top goalscorer.

Jô made his first appearance of the 2016 season in the opening match, a 0–0 draw with Batatais on 30 January 2016, playing the full 90 minutes. Four days later, he scored his first goal of the season with the winner in a 2–1 victory over Rio Branco at Anacleto Campanella. In the following match, against Votuporanguense, on 6 February, Jô scored a brace and led his team to a 3–0 away win. His sixth career multi-goal match came against Taubaté on 3 April, in a 4–3 home win that helped Azulão reach the top of the table. Jô finished the 2016 Campeonato Paulista Série A2 as São Caetano's top goalscorer, with seven goals scored in 17 matches.

His first hat-trick came in a 3–0 victory over Flamengo de Guarulhos in the Copa Paulista on 24 July 2016. Since midway through the 2015 Série D, Jô started taking injections for his right knee, on which he had surgery two times earlier in his career. Although a third surgery was needed, Jô kept on postponing it in order to keep playing. While suffering from knee pain, he managed to lead São Caetano to the semifinals of the 2016 Copa Paulista, scoring five goals during the tournament.

In November 2016, Jô underwent right knee surgery for the third time in his playing career, which would kept him out of the remainder of the season. Although he was expected to be fit for the 2017 Campeonato Paulista Série A2, an infection prompted him to undergo another surgery to his knee. Jô made his return for São Caetano on 30 September 2017 after coming on as a 88th-minute substitute in a 3–2 victory against Desportivo Brasil. Jô did not play in the remainder of the Copa Paulista, instead choosing to practice in order to get fit for the 2018 Campeonato Paulista Série A1.

Jô got the 2018 season underway in São Caetano's 2–0 away win against Linense on 24 January. He played the first half of the match before being subbed out. Three days later, Jô was also named in the starting lineup for the match against Novorizontino, but again was subbed out during half time. On 1 February 2018, he angrily left in the middle of a training session and asked to be released by the club. Jô cited his inability to keep on playing due to constant pain on his right knee as the reason for this, and at age 26, he retired from professional football.

== Personal life ==
Jô's older brother, Mário, is also a footballer and former player for the Russian national football team. Alongside Mário and their father, they run a seven-a-side football team called Brothers MJ.

== Honours ==
=== Club ===
São Caetano

- Campeonato Paulista Série A2: 2017

=== Individual ===
- Série D top scorer: 2015 (12 goals)
