= Dinélson =

Brazilian footballer (born 1986)

Personal information
- Full name: Dinélson dos Santos Lima
- Date of birth: February 4, 1986 (age 40)
- Place of birth: Anagé, Brazil
- Height: 1.66 m (5 ft 5 in)
- Position: Attacking midfielder

Youth career
- Guarani

Senior career*
Years	Team	Apps	(Gls)
2003	Guarani	-	(-)
2004–2005	Corinthians	-	(-)
2006	→ Atlético Mineiro (loan)	-	(-)
2006	→ São Caetano (loan)	-	(-)
2007	→ Paraná (loan)	-	(-)
2007–2008	Corinthians	7	(2)
2008–2009	Coritiba	1	(0)
2009	Paraná	5	(1)
2010–2013	Avaí	6	(0)
2011	→ Paraná (loan)	10	(3)
2012	→ Daegu FC (loan)	26	(3)
2013	Tianjin Teda	14	(2)
2013	Ceará	12	(0)
2014	Paulista	7	(0)
2014	Red Bull Brasil	9	(1)
2014	Portuguesa	3	(0)
2016	J. Malucelli	9	(0)
2016	ASA	4	(0)
- * Club domestic league appearances and goals as of 3 September 2014

Dinélson dos Santos Lima, simply known as Dinélson, (born February 4, 1986) is a Brazilian footballer who plays as an attacking midfielder.
