= Rondinelly =

Brazilian footballer

Personal information
- Full name: Rondinelly de Andrade Silva
- Date of birth: 8 February 1991 (age 35)
- Place of birth: Rialma, Brazil
- Height: 1.72 m (5 ft 8 in)
- Position: Attacking midfielder

Team information
- Current team: São José

Youth career
- –2010: Vila Nova

Senior career*
Years	Team	Apps	(Gls)
2011–2012	Vila Nova	18	(3)
2011	→ Trindade (loan)	7	(0)
2011	→ Itumbiara (loan)	2	(0)
2012–2017	Grêmio	19	(0)
2013	→ Palmeiras (loan)	3	(0)
2014	→ Portuguesa (loan)	16	(2)
2014	→ Luverdense (loan)	3	(0)
2015	→ Audax (loan)	12	(3)
2016	→ Macaé (loan)	10	(2)
2016	→ Londrina (loan)	19	(0)
2017	Botafogo	9	(0)
2018–2019	Guarani	53	(9)
2020	Santo André	9	(0)
2020	América-RN	17	(4)
2021	Inter de Limeira	12	(1)
2021	Santa Cruz	9	(0)
2022	XV de Piracicaba	8	(0)
2022	Retrô	4	(2)
2023–	São José	16	(2)
- * Club domestic league appearances and goals as of 9 October 2023

Rondinelly de Andrade Silva (born 8 February 1991) is a Brazilian professional footballer who plays as an attacking midfielder for São José.

== Honours ==
Palmeiras

- Campeonato Brasileiro Série B: 2013
