= Lucas Caires =

Brazilian footballer (born 1992)

Personal information
- Full name: Lucas Caires Ferreira
- Date of birth: 29 June 1992 (age 34)
- Place of birth: São Paulo, Brazil
- Position: Left back

Youth career
- Corinthians
- Audax

Senior career*
Years	Team	Apps	(Gls)
2013–2014	CA Diadema		
2014	União Barbarense	6	(0)
2014	Portuguesa	2	(0)
2017	Goianésia	0	(0)
- * Club domestic league appearances and goals as of 22 October 2014

Lucas Caires Ferreira (born 29 June 1992) is a Brazilian footballer who plays as a left back.

== Career ==
Born in São Paulo, Caires began his career with CA Diadema, appearing with the club in Campeonato Paulista Segunda Divisão. In July 2014 he moved to União Barbarense, playing regularly in that year's Copa Paulista.

In September 2014 Caires rescinded his link with Barbarense and moved to Portuguesa. He played his first match as a professional on 11 October, replacing Jocinei in the 70th minute of a 1–3 away loss against América-MG for the Série B championship.

In December Caires left the club, after the expiry of his link. He only returned to professional football on 14 December 2016, by joining Goianésia.
