= Wágner (footballer, born 1989) =

Brazilian footballer

Personal information
- Full name: Wágner Luiz Fogolari
- Date of birth: 19 November 1989 (age 36)
- Place of birth: Porto Alegre, Brazil
- Height: 1.91 m (6 ft 3 in)
- Position: Centre-back

Team information
- Current team: Sampaio Corrêa
- Number: 27

Youth career
- 1998–2008: Grêmio

Senior career*
Years	Team	Apps	(Gls)
2008–2010	Grêmio	0	(0)
2010	→ São José-RS (loan)	12	(2)
2010–2011	Cosenza	12	(0)
2011	Modena	2	(0)
2011	Benevento	1	(0)
2012	São José-RS	7	(0)
2012–2014	São Caetano	45	(3)
2014	Portuguesa	15	(0)
2015	Veranópolis	1	(0)
2016	São José-RS	14	(1)
2016	Oeste	1	(0)
2016–	Sampaio Corrêa	29	(2)
- * Club domestic league appearances and goals

Wágner Luiz Fogolari (born 19 November 1989) or simply Wágner, is a Brazilian professional footballer who plays for Sampaio Corrêa as a central defender.

== Career ==
Wágner was born in Porto Alegre.

=== Grêmio ===
In January 2008, as the season started, he was promoted to the first team after a strong and solid performances in the youth side. His huge physical presence and good aerial game in pre-season impress the managers and earned him a spot in the starting eleven, with only 18 years-old.

But he failed to impress making some weak appearances in the Rio Grande do Sul State Championship, including an own goal in a 2–2 draw against Caxias.

After that, he was relegated to play in the B squad in order to give more experience. In October, he took a squad number in Campeonato Brasileiro roster and back to training with the first team. On 8 November 2008, he was named on the bench for his first Championship game, Gremio's 1–0 away win against Palmeiras, but was an unused substitute.
