= Luan Viana =

Brazilian footballer

Personal information
- Full name: Luan Viana Patrocínio
- Date of birth: 14 January 1996 (age 30)
- Place of birth: São Paulo, Brazil
- Height: 1.84 m (6 ft 0 in)
- Position: Forward

Team information
- Current team: Mixto

Youth career
- 2008–2014: Portuguesa
- 2015–2016: Grêmio

Senior career*
Years	Team	Apps	(Gls)
2013–2014	Portuguesa	9	(1)
2017–2018	Grêmio	0	(0)
2018	Shabab Al-Ahli	0	(0)
2018	→ Paraná (loan)	1	(0)
2018–2019	Levski Sofia	1	(0)
2019	→ Tsarsko Selo (loan)	5	(1)
2020	Portuguesa	1	(0)
2021	CEOV Operário	7	(5)
2022	Nova Iguaçu	1	(0)
2022	CEOV Operário	6	(0)
2022–	Mixto	11	(7)

International career
2013–2016	Brazil U20	2	(0)
- * Club domestic league appearances and goals as of 15:42, 27 February 2023 (UTC)

Luan Viana Patrocínio (born 14 January 1996), sometimes known simply as Luan, is a Brazilian professional footballer who plays as a forward for Mixto.

== Career ==
Born in São Paulo, Luan Viana graduated from Portuguesa's youth setup, and made his first-team debut on 13 February 2013, coming on as a late substitute in a 2–0 win at São José, for the Campeonato Paulista Série A2 championship.

On 8 August, Luan Viana was definitely promoted to the main squad in Série A. However, he failed to appear during the rest of the year.

On 26 April 2014, Luan Viana made his league debut for Lusa, playing the last 19 minutes of a 1–1 home draw against Santa Cruz, for the Série B championship. He scored his first professional goal on 8 November, netting the game's only through a header in a 1–0 home win over Luverdense, as his side were already relegated to Série C.

On 9 January 2015, Luan Viana left the club, after having unpaid wages. He joined Grêmio in March, returning to youth setup.

On 6 September 2018, Luan Viana signed a longterm contract with the Bulgarian 26 times champions Levski Sofia After failing to make it into the first team in the first half of the season, in January 2019 he was sent on loan to the Second League leaders Tsarsko Selo. He scored two goals in a friendly match against the Macedonian team FK Belasica played on 5 February. After spending first three matches from the league on the bench, Luan made his debut for the team in the league match against Chernomorets Balchik and scored a goal for the 3–1 win.

== Honours ==
International

- Toulon Tournament: 2013
