= Régis (footballer, born June 1989) =

Brazilian footballer

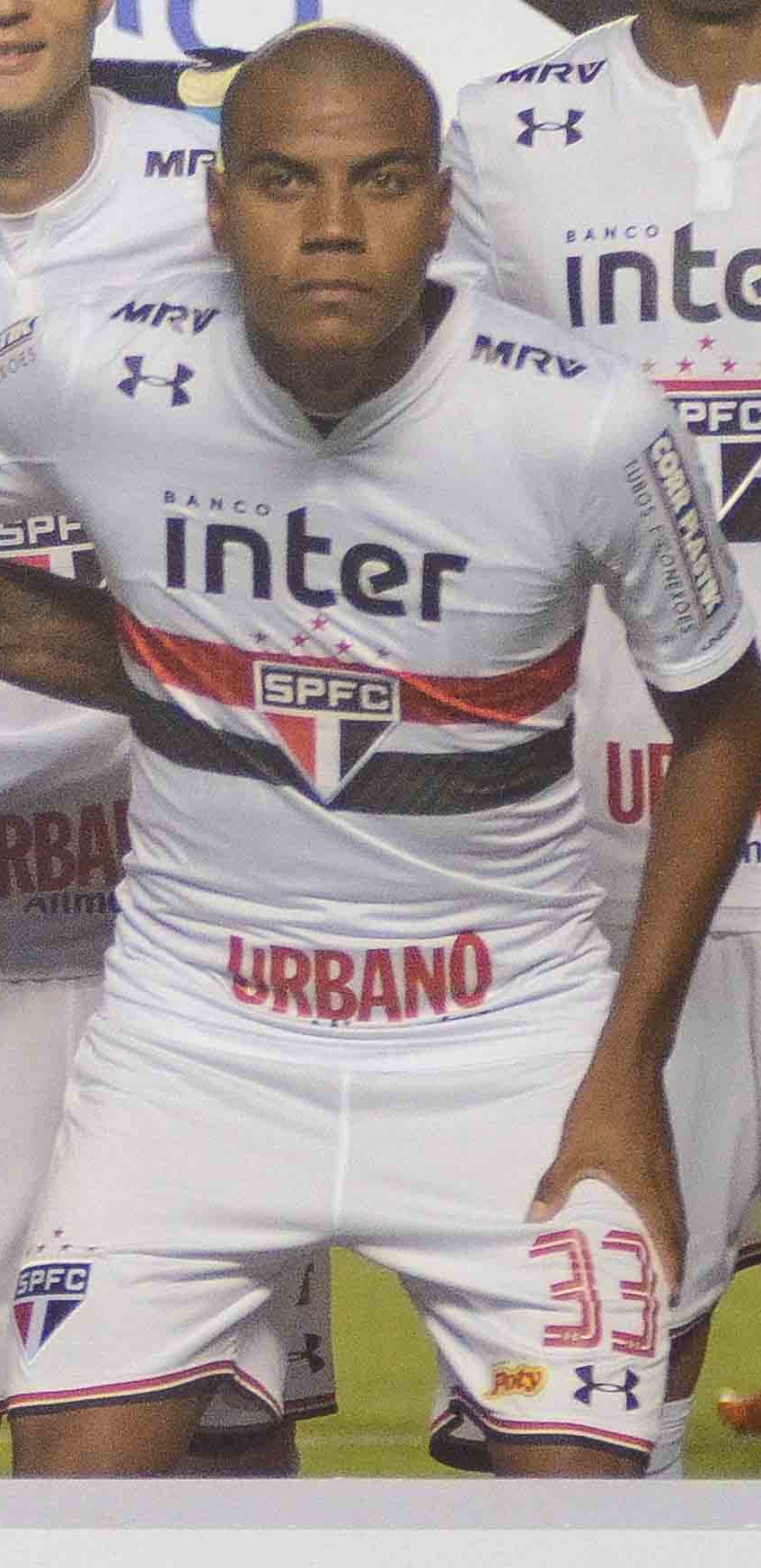

Personal information
- Full name: Régis Ribeiro de Souza
- Date of birth: 3 June 1989 (age 37)
- Place of birth: Brasília, Brazil
- Height: 1.79 m (5 ft 10 in)
- Position: Right-back

Youth career
- Legião

Senior career*
Years	Team	Apps	(Gls)
2007–2009	Legião		
2009	CFZ-DF		
2009–2010	Goiás		
2010–2011	Guaratinguetá	21	(0)
2011–2013	São Bernardo	27	(2)
2012	→ Marcílio Dias (loan)	0	(0)
2012	→ Paysandu (loan)	8	(1)
2013–2014	Ponte Preta	23	(0)
2014	Portuguesa	28	(0)
2014–2015	Botafogo	13	(0)
2015	Capivariano	8	(0)
2015	Red Bull Brasil	2	(0)
2016	São Bento	11	(2)
2016	Luverdense	16	(2)
2016	Guarani	8	(0)
2017	São Bento	11	(1)
2017	Bahia	2	(0)
2018	São Bento	11	(1)
2018	São Paulo	11	(0)
2019	CSA	3	(1)
2019	São Bento	8	(1)
2020	Juventus-SC	3	(0)
2020	União Cacoalense	1	(0)
2020	Gama	2	(0)
2020	Fast Clube	6	(2)
2021	Sampaio Corrêa	7	(1)
2021	→ Volta Redonda (loan)	0	(0)
2021	Paranoá	0	(0)
2022	ASA	0	(0)
2022	CRAC	2	(0)
2022	Sobradinho-DF	0	(0)
- * Club domestic league appearances and goals as of 18:04, 28 July 2022 (UTC)

Régis Ribeiro de Souza (born 3 June 1989), simply known as Régis, is a Brazilian professional footballer who plays as a right-back.

== Career ==
Born in Brasília, Distrito Federal, Régis made his senior debuts with Legião. Shortly after he joined CFZ de Brasília, and after some good performances he moved to Goiás in the 2009 summer.

Régis was released by the Esmeraldino at the end of the 2009 season, and joined Americana in early 2010. In the following year he signed with São Bernardo FC, and was loaned to Marcílio Dias and Paysandu in February and May 2012, respectively. He returned to São Bernardo in September, after not receiving wages.

On 21 May 2013, Régis signed with Ponte Preta. On 4 August he made his Série A debut, starting in a 1–1 home draw against Fluminense.

On 17 January 2014, Régis signed with Portuguesa. After appearing regularly with Lusa he moved to Botafogo on 25 September.

== Honours ==
- Campeonato Paulista Série A2: 2011
