= Arnaldo (footballer, born 1992) =

Brazilian footballer

Personal information
- Full name: Arnaldo Manoel de Almeida
- Date of birth: 15 April 1992 (age 34)
- Place of birth: Uberaba, Brazil
- Height: 1.73 m (5 ft 8 in)
- Position: Right back

Team information
- Current team: Náutico Capibaribe
- Number: 2

Youth career
- 2010: EF Bady Bassitt
- 2010–2012: Mirassol

Senior career*
Years	Team	Apps	(Gls)
2011–2015	Mirassol	25	(2)
2013	→ Rio Branco-SP (loan)	11	(0)
2013	→ América de Natal (loan)	4	(0)
2014	→ Portuguesa (loan)	24	(0)
2015–2016	Penapolense	13	(0)
2015	→ Criciúma (loan)	7	(0)
2015–2016	→ Joinville (loan)	4	(0)
2016	→ Novorizontino (loan)	3	(0)
2016–2017	Ituano	26	(0)
2017–2019	Botafogo	37	(1)
2018	→ Ceará (loan)	12	(0)
2019	→ Ponte Preta (loan)	30	(0)
2020	Avaí	16	(0)
2020–2021	Atlético Goianiense	60	(0)
2022	Operário Ferroviário	50	(0)
2023	Mirassol	4	(0)
2023	CSA	14	(0)
2024–	Náutico Capibaribe	81	(1)
- * Club domestic league appearances and goals as of 18 November 2026

Arnaldo Manoel de Almeida (born 15 April 1992), simply known as Arnaldo, is a Brazilian footballer who plays as a right back for Náutico Capibaribe.

== Career ==
Born in Uberaba, Minas Gerais, Arnaldo moved to São Paulo at early age, after being spotted by a former player, Jorge Lima; he joined a youth setup in Bady Bassitt in 2010 before moving to Mirassol's youth squads in the summer. As a forward, he was converted to a right-back during the process.

On 17 April 2011 Arnaldo made his first-team debut, coming on as a second-half substitute of a 0–3 loss at Botafogo-SP, for the Paulistão championship. On 28 August 2012 he signed a new two-year deal with Leão.

After being loaned to Rio Branco at the start of the 2013 season, Arnaldo joined América-RN in May 2013, also on loan. He returned to Mirassol at the end of the year, and after impressing while on the club in 2014, he joined Portuguesa on 23 April 2014.

On 3 December, after appearing regularly for Lusa, Arnaldo moved to Penapolense, also in a temporary deal until May. On 15 April 2015 he joined Criciúma, on loan until the end of the year.

On 10 January 2019, Arnaldo was loaned out to Ponte Preta for the 2019 season from Botafogo.

== Honours ==
=== Club ===
Botafogo

- Campeonato Carioca: 2018

Atlético Goianiense

- Campeonato Goiano: 2020
