= Thiago Brito =

Brazilian footballer (born 1992)

Personal information
- Full name: Thiago Esmerindo de Souza de Brito
- Date of birth: 20 August 1992 (age 34)
- Place of birth: Eldorado dos Carajás, Brazil
- Height: 1.74 m (5 ft 9 in)
- Position: Forward

Team information
- Current team: Sport London e Benfica
- Number: 77

Youth career
- Figueirense
- Santos

Senior career*
Years	Team	Apps	(Gls)
2011	Pinheiros		
2011–2012	Uberaba	5	(0)
2012	→ Grêmio Barueri (loan)	18	(2)
2013–2014	Grêmio Barueri	18	(0)
2014	Portuguesa	2	(0)
2015	Santos	0	(0)
2015	→ Al-Nasr (loan)		(4)
2015	→ Al-Musannah (loan)		
2016	Vila Nova	2	(1)
2016	Campinense	2	(0)
2017	URT	11	(0)
2018	Patrocinense	0	(0)
2019	Manaus	4	(0)
2018–2019	Birkirkara	13	(0)
2019–2020	Manaus	0	(0)
2020	Nacional-AM	1	(0)
2021	Nacional-PB	3	(0)
2022	NW London		
2023–	Sport London e Benfica		
- * Club domestic league appearances and goals as of 17:54, 19 November 2023 (UTC)

Thiago Esmerindo de Souza de Brito (born 20 August 1992) is a Brazilian professional footballer who plays for Sport London e Benfica as a forward.

== Career ==
Born in Eldorado dos Carajás, Pará, Brito graduated with Santos' youth setup, after starting it out at Figueirense. He made his senior debuts with Pinheiros in the Campeonato Catarinense's third level, and moved to Uberaba in November 2011.

In July 2012 Brito moved to Grêmio Barueri, on loan until the end of the season. He made his debut as a professional on the 7th, coming on as a second-half substitute in a 4–0 away loss against Joinville.

Brito scored his first professional goals six days later, netting a brace in a 3–0 away success against Ipatinga. He was bought outright at the end of the season.

On 22 September 2014, Brito was presented at Portuguesa. He only appeared rarely, and was released in December.

On 4 February 2015 Brito returned to Santos, signing a two-year contract and being immediately loaned to Al-Nasr SC.
