= Jussandro =

Brazilian footballer (born 1992)

Personal information
- Full name: Jussandro Pimenta Matos
- Date of birth: 11 March 1992 (age 34)
- Place of birth: Irecê, Brazil
- Height: 1.78 m (5 ft 10 in)
- Position: Left-back

Team information
- Current team: Rio Claro

Youth career
- 2010–2012: Bahia

Senior career*
Years	Team	Apps	(Gls)
2012–2014	Bahia	45	(0)
2014	Portuguesa	4	(0)
2014	Chapecoense	7	(0)
2015	ABC	3	(0)
2016	Botafogo SP	3	
2016	Remo	5	(0)
2017	Batatais	14	
2018	Penapolense	7	
2019	Iporá	5	
2019–	Rio Claro	5	
- * Club domestic league appearances and goals as of 13:29, 23 April 2019 (UTC)

Jussandro Pimenta Matos (born 11 March 1992), simply Jussandro, is a Brazilian footballer who plays for Rio Claro as a left-back.

== Career ==
Born in Irecê, Jussandro graduated from Bahia's youth setup, and made his first-team debut on 26 August 2012, starting and playing 60 minutes in a 1–1 home draw against Atlético Goianiense, for the Campeonato Brasileiro Série A championship. After appearing regularly during the 2012 and 2013 campaigns, he was left out of the squad in March 2014.

On 18 June 2014, Jussandro joined Portuguesa, after rescinding his link with Bahia. However, after appearing sparingly he again rescinded his deal, and moved to top-divisioner Chapecoense on 23 September.

== Honours ==
- Campeonato Baiano: 2012, 2014
