= Maycon (footballer, born 1985) =

Brazilian footballer

Personal information
- Full name: Maycon Vieira de Freitas
- Date of birth: 14 February 1985 (age 41)
- Place of birth: Vitória, Brazil
- Height: 1.80 m (5 ft 11 in)
- Position: Defensive midfielder

Youth career
- 2004–2005: Internacional

Senior career*
Years	Team	Apps	(Gls)
2006–2011	Internacional	15	(0)
2011	→ Guarani (loan)	14	(0)
2011	→ Paraná (loan)	13	(0)
2012	Vila Nova	0	(0)
2013–2014	São José-RS	7	(0)
2014	Portuguesa	16	(1)
2015	Sampaio Corrêa	0	(0)
2016	Feirense	4	(0)
2017	Espírito Santo	5	(0)
- * Club domestic league appearances and goals

Maycon Vieira de Freitas (born 14 February 1985), or simply Maycon, is a Brazilian former professional footballer who played as a defensive midfielder.
