= Jânio (footballer) =

Brazilian footballer

Personal information
- Full name: Jânio Daniel do Nascimento Santos
- Date of birth: July 3, 1991 (age 35)
- Place of birth: Parnaíba, Brazil
- Height: 1.74 m (5 ft 9 in)
- Position: Forward

Team information
- Current team: Altos

Youth career
- Atlético-PR
- 2008–2009: Ferroviário-CE
- 2010: Coritiba

Senior career*
Years	Team	Apps	(Gls)
2011–2013	Coritiba	5	(0)
2011	→ CFZ-DF (loan)		
2011	→ São Carlos (loan)		
2012	→ Ferroviário-CE (loan)	9	(1)
2013	→ J. Malucelli (loan)		
2013	→ Parnahyba (loan)		
2013	→ Junior Team (loan)	?	(5)
2014	Criciúma	0	(0)
2014	→ Nacional-MG (loan)	7	(3)
2014	→ Portuguesa (loan)	7	(1)
2015	Parnahyba	7	(1)
2015	Monte Azul	7	(0)
2016	Anápolis	3	(1)
2017	Serra Talhada	8	(3)
2017	Parnahyba	5	(1)
2017	Mogi Mirim	7	(0)
2018	Parnahyba	9	(0)
2019	ASSU	11	(5)
2019	Guarany de Sobral	2	(0)
2020–	Altos	0	(0)
- * Club domestic league appearances and goals as of 14 August 2016

Jânio Daniel do Nascimento Santos, simply known as Jânio (born 3 July 1991), is a Brazilian professional footballer who plays for Associação Atlética de Altos as a forward.

== Career ==
Born in Parnaíba, Piauí, Jânio graduated from Coritiba's youth setup, and was subsequently loaned to CFZ-DF, São Carlos, Ferroviário, J. Malucelli, Parnahyba, and Junior Team. After scoring five goals with the latter, he returned to Coxa in September 2013.

Jânio made his Coritiba – and Série A – debut on replacing Bill in a 0–3 away loss against Atlético Mineiro. He appeared in five matches during the campaign, as his side narrowly avoided relegation.

On 8 January 2014 Jânio signed for Criciúma. On 10 February he was loaned to Nacional-MG, appearing regularly and scoring three goals.

On 7 July 2014 Jânio joined Portuguesa on loan until the end of the year.
