= Coutinho (footballer, born 1984) =

Brazilian footballer (1984–2020)

Personal information
- Full name: Rafael Coutinho Barcellos dos Santos
- Date of birth: 7 March 1984
- Place of birth: Macaé, Brazil
- Date of death: 4 October 2020 (aged 36)
- Place of death: Armação dos Búzios, Brazil
- Height: 1.71 m (5 ft 7 in)
- Position: Defensive midfielder

Team information
- Current team: Tombense

Youth career
- 2001–2002: Vasco

Senior career*
Years	Team	Apps	(Gls)
2003–2007	Vasco	65	(2)
2005–2006	→ Estrela Amadora (loan)	23	(1)
2007–2020	Tombense	12	(1)
2007–2008	→ Botafogo (loan)		
2008	→ Criciúma (loan)	36	(1)
2009	→ Fortaleza (loan)	25	(2)
2010–2012	→ Figueirense (loan)	67	(2)
2013	→ Guarani (loan)	10	(0)
2013	→ América-RN (loan)	13	(0)
2014	→ Portuguesa (loan)	9	(1)
- * Club domestic league appearances and goals as of 13 October 2014

Rafael Coutinho Barcellos dos Santos (7 March 1984 – 4 October 2020), known as just Coutinho, was a Brazilian footballer who played for Agremiação Sportiva Arapiraquense (ASA) as a defensive midfielder.

== Career ==
Coutinho made his professional debut aged 19 for Vasco da Gama in the 2–1 win over Coritiba on 25 September 2003. He scored his first goal in the Rio Derby against Flamengo on 11 April 2004.

Coutinho was signed by Fortaleza in a one-year deal in January 2009.

== Honours ==
Tombense

- Campeonato Brasileiro Série D: 2014
