= Djair =

Djair may refer to:

- Djair language, a language of Papua, Indonesia
- Djair Kaye de Brito, Brazilian footballer, nicknamed 'Djair'
- Djair Baptista Machado, Brazilian footballer, nicknamed 'Djair'
- Djair Veiga Francisco Junior, Brazilian footballer, nicknamed 'Djair'
- Djair Parfitt-Williams, Bermudan footballer
