= Fran (footballer, born May 1992) =

Brazilian footballer

Personal information
- Full name: Francisco Teocharis Papaiordanou Filho
- Date of birth: May 5, 1992 (age 34)
- Place of birth: São Paulo, Brazil
- Height: 1.70 m (5 ft 7 in)
- Position: Attacking midfielder

Team information
- Current team: Corinthians B

Youth career
- 2008–2011: Corinthians

Senior career*
Years	Team	Apps	(Gls)
2011–2012	Corinthians	0	(0)
2011–2012	→ Guaratinguetá (loan)	19	(2)
2013	Paulista	0	(0)
2013–2014	XV Piracicaba	0	(0)
2013	→ Grêmio Barueri (loan)	0	(0)
2014	Grêmio Osasco	11	(0)
2014–2015	Portuguesa	1	(0)
2015	Nacional-SP	5	(0)
2016	Atlético Sorocaba	6	(2)
2016	Flamengo-SP	0	(0)
2017	Juventus-SP	0	(0)
2018	Noroeste	1	(0)
2019	Primavera	0	(0)
2019–	Corinthians B	0	(0)
- * Club domestic league appearances and goals as of 15:47, 29 September 2020 (UTC)

Francisco Teocharis Papaiordanou Filho, commonly known as Fran (born 5 May 1992), is a Brazilian footballer who plays for Corinthians B as an attacking midfielder.

== Career ==
Born in São Paulo, Fran played graduated from Corinthians' youth system, and was subsequently loaned to Guaratinguetá in July 2011. He played his first match as a professional on 19 November, playing the last 28 minutes of a 2–1 home success against Vila Nova for the Série B championship.

On 13 December 2012 Fran rescinded his link with Timão and moved to Paulista. After making no appearances for the latter he joined XV de Piracicaba, playing with the club in Copa Paulista.

In late July 2013 Fran was loaned to Grêmio Barueri until November. In 2014, he joined Grêmio Osasco, and after appearing regularly he moved to Portuguesa on 7 July 2014.
