= André Astorga =

Brazilian footballer (born 1980)

Personal information
- Full name: André Izepon Astorga
- Date of birth: January 7, 1980 (age 46)
- Place of birth: Santa Fé, Brazil
- Height: 1.90 m (6 ft 3 in)
- Position: Centre back

Senior career*
Years	Team	Apps	(Gls)
- Portuguesa Londrinense
–1996	Roma Barueri		
1996–2001	Hannover 96		
2001–2002	União Barbarense		
2002–2003	Vila Nova		
2003–2005	Portuguesa Santista		
2005–2006	Rot-Weiß Oberhausen	42	(3)
2006–2007	Adap Galo Maringá		
2006–2007	Remo	2	(0)
2007–2008	FC Universitatea Cluj	12	(2)
2008	Eskisehirspor	0	(0)
2009	Santos	9	(0)
2010	Bragantino	30	(0)
2011	Sport	0	(0)
2011–2013	Bragantino	45	(3)
2013	Boa Esporte	13	(0)
2014	Bragantino	1	(0)
2014	Portuguesa	6	(0)
2015	Caldas Novas	10	(0)
2015–2016	Juventus-SP	16	(1)
- * Club domestic league appearances and goals as of 3 April 2016

André Izepon Astorga (born 7 January 1980) is a Brazilian former footballer who played as a central defender.

== Club career ==
Astorga previously played two seasons for Rot-Weiß Oberhausen in the German 2. Bundesliga.
