= Eduardo Diniz =

Brazilian footballer (born 1989)

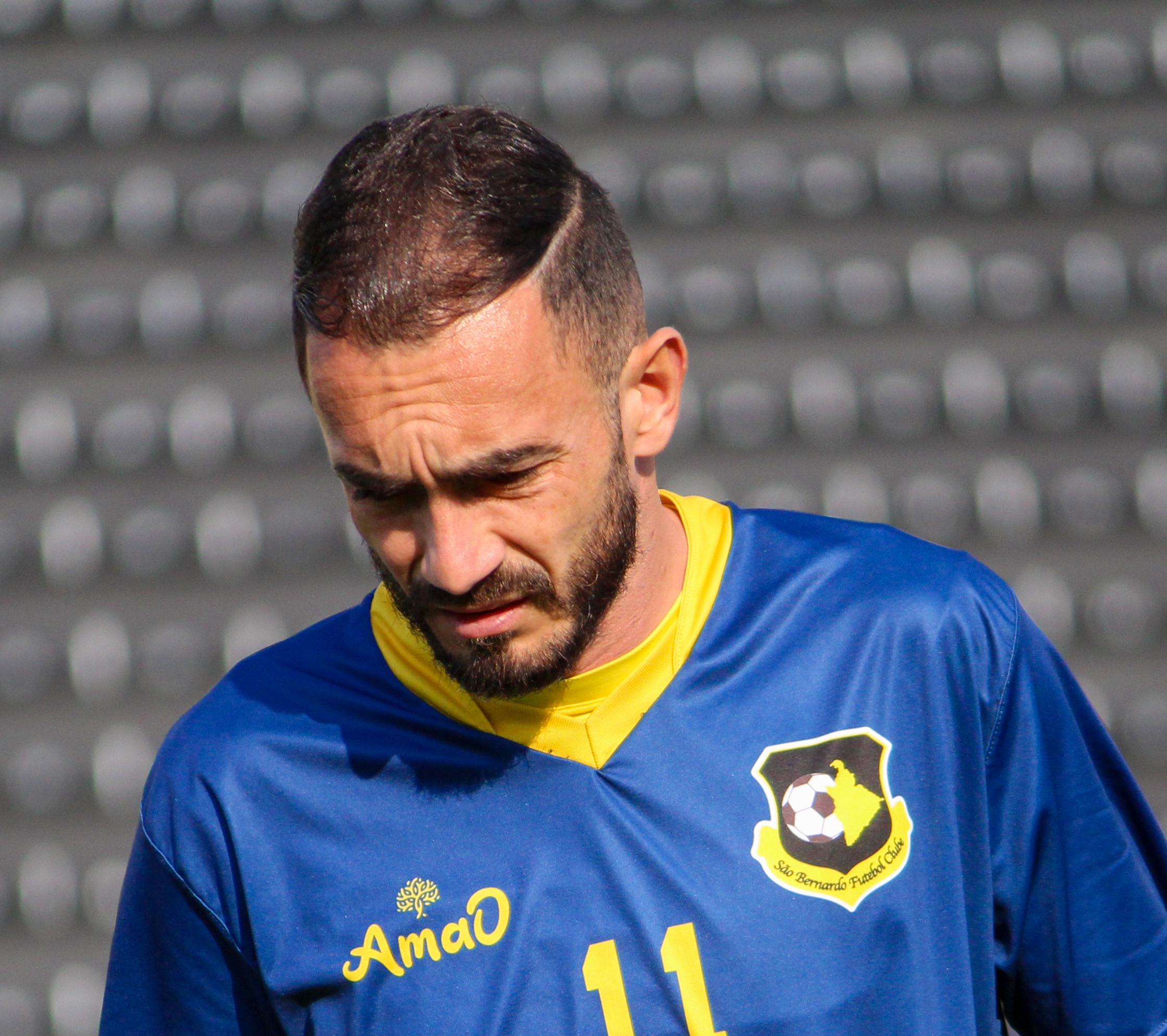
- Eduardo Diniz in 2022

Personal information
- Full name: Eduardo José Diniz Costa
- Date of birth: 18 April 1989 (age 37)
- Place of birth: Guaraí, Brazil
- Height: 1.79 m (5 ft 10 in)
- Position: Full back

Team information
- Current team: Ituano

Youth career
- 2004–2007: Paulista

Senior career*
Years	Team	Apps	(Gls)
2006–2011	Paulista	61	(0)
2009	→ Guarani (loan)	23	(1)
2010	→ Palmeiras (loan)	14	(0)
2010–2011	→ Vitória (loan)	14	(0)
2012	Gamba Osaka	0	(0)
2013	Mirassol	3	(0)
2013	Comercial-SP	6	(0)
2013–2018	São Bernardo	45	(1)
2014	→ Portuguesa (loan)	6	(0)
2014	→ América Mineiro (loan)	1	(0)
2016	→ Ceará (loan)	30	(3)
2017	→ Atlético Goianiense (loan)	7	(0)
2017	→ CRB (loan)	3	(0)
2018	→ Linense (loan)	8	(0)
2018	Joinville	7	(0)
2019–2021	Caxias	45	(0)
2021	São Bernardo	10	(0)
2022	Portuguesa	17	(1)
2022–2023	São Bernardo	20	(2)
2023–2024	Portuguesa	11	(1)
2024–	Ituano	0	(0)
- * Club domestic league appearances and goals as of 16:11, 18 March 2024 (UTC)

Eduardo José Diniz Costa (born 18 April 1989), known as Eduardo Diniz, is a Brazilian footballer who plays as a full back for Ituano.

== Career ==
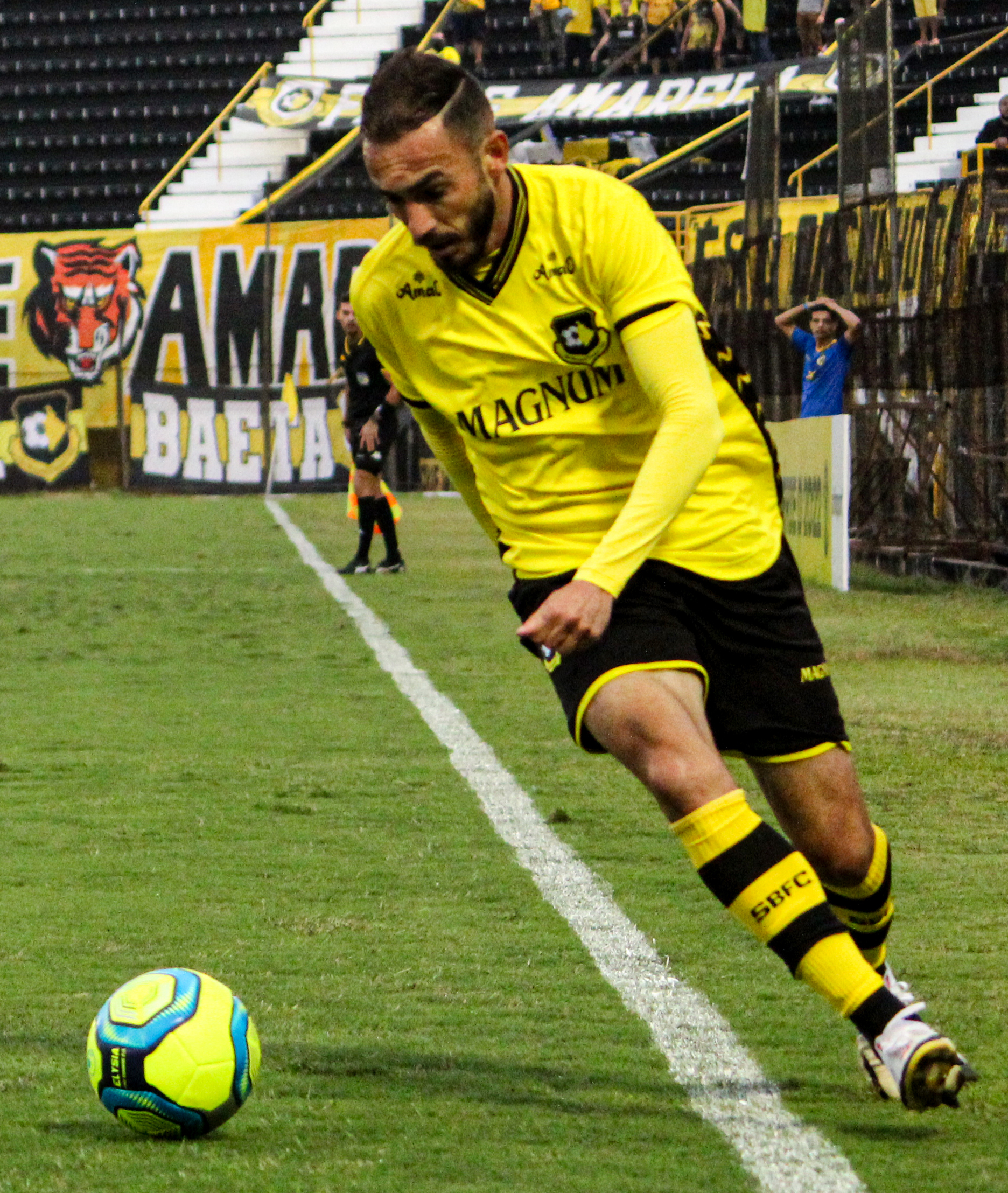
Eduardo Diniz with São Bernardo in 2022

Eduardo was born in Guaraí and moved to Araguaína, both in the state of Tocantins, at the age of eight. He began his career with Paulista in 2006, becoming a regular starter from the 2008 season onwards.

Eduardo spent the 2009 Série B on loan at Guarani, before being announced as a Palmeiras player on 9 January 2010. After being regularly used during the 2010 Campeonato Paulista, he lost his starting spot in the 2010 Série A, and moved to fellow top tier side Vitória on 7 August.

In May 2011, after just one match during the year and struggling with injuries, Eduardo was sent back to Paulista. He then spent the 2012 season on loan at Japanese club Gamba Osaka, also playing rarely.

On 4 January 2013, Eduardo agreed to a permanent contract with Mirassol, but moved to Comercial-SP in March. He finished the season with São Bernardo, before being loaned to Portuguesa on 23 April 2014.

On 26 June 2014, after being rarely used at Lusa, Eduardo moved to América Mineiro also on loan. After only playing once, he returned to São Bernardo, being loaned out to Ceará on 30 April 2016.

On 6 April 2017, still owned by São Bernardo, Eduardo joined Atlético Goianiense. He moved to CRB also in a temporary deal on 31 July, and agreed to a loan deal with Linense on 13 December.

On 18 April 2018, Eduardo signed a permanent deal with Joinville. He was presented at Caxias on 3 January 2019, being regularly used during his three-year spell at the club.

In April 2021, Eduardo returned to São Bernardo after four years, and won the Campeonato Paulista Série A2 and the Copa Paulista with the club. On 13 December of that year, he returned to Lusa, also winning the second level of the Paulistão.

On 22 April 2022, Eduardo returned to São Bernardo for a third spell. On 27 April 2023, he returned to Portuguesa, and renewed his contract with the latter on 4 December.

== Career statistics ==
As of 18 March 2024

Club	Season	League			State League		Cup		Continental		Other		Total	
Club	Season	Division	Apps	Goals	Apps	Goals	Apps	Goals	Apps	Goals	Apps	Goals	Apps	Goals
Paulista	2006	Série B	14	0	1	0	—		—		—		15	0
Paulista	2007	Série B	5	0	6	0	—		—		14 (Note: Appearance(s) in Copa Paulista)	0	25	0
Paulista	2008	Série C	5	0	16	0	—		—		—		21	0
Paulista	2009	Paulista	—		14	0	—		—		—		14	0
Paulista	2011	Paulista	—		—		—		—		1	0	1	0
Paulista	Total		24	0	37	0	—		—		15	0	76	0
Guarani (loan)	2009	Série B	23	1	—		—		—		—		23	1
Palmeiras (loan)	2010	Série A	3	0	11	0	3	0	—		—		17	0
Vitória (loan)	2010	Série A	13	0	—		—		2 (Note: Appearance(s) in Copa Sudamericana)	0	—		15	0
Vitória (loan)	2011	Série B	0	0	1	0	0	0	—		—		1	0
Vitória (loan)	Total		13	0	1	0	0	0	2	0	—		16	0
Gamba Osaka (loan)	2012	J. League Division 1	0	0	—		0	0	—		1 (Note: Appearance(s) in J.League Cup)	0	1	0
Mirassol	2013	Paulista	—		3	0	—		—		—		3	0
Comercial-SP	2013	Paulista A2	—		6	0	—		—		—		6	0
São Bernardo	2013	Paulista	—		—		—		—		20	0	20	0
São Bernardo	2014	Paulista	—		5	0	2	0	—		9	1	16	1
São Bernardo	2015	Paulista	—		5	0	—		—		12	2	17	2
São Bernardo	2016	Paulista	—		14	0	—		—		—		14	0
São Bernardo	2017	Série D	0	0	12	0	—		—		—		12	0
São Bernardo	Total		0	0	36	0	2	0	—		41	3	79	3
Portuguesa (loan)	2014	Série B	6	0	—		—		—		—		6	0
América Mineiro (loan)	2014	Série B	1	0	—		—		—		—		1	0
Ceará (loan)	2016	Série B	30	3	—		4	0	—		—		34	3
Atlético Goianiense (loan)	2017	Série A	7	0	—		2	0	—		—		9	0
CRB (loan)	2017	Série B	3	0	—		—		—		—		3	0
Linense (loan)	2018	Série D	0	0	8	0	—		—		—		8	0
Joinville	2018	Série C	7	0	—		—		—		—		7	0
Caxias	2019	Série D	11	0	8	0	—		—		13 (Note: Appearance(s) in Copa FGF)	0	32	0
Caxias	2020	Série D	11	0	7	0	—		—		—		18	0
Caxias	2021	Série D	0	0	8	0	1	0	—		—		9	0
Caxias	Total		22	0	23	0	1	0	—		13	0	59	0
São Bernardo	2021	Paulista A2	—		10	0	—		—		10	0	20	0
Portuguesa	2022	Paulista A2	—		17	1	—		—		—		17	1
São Bernardo	2022	Série D	16	2	—		—		—		—		16	2
São Bernardo	2023	Série C	0	0	4	0	0	0	—		—		4	0
São Bernardo	Total		16	2	4	0	0	0	—		—		20	2
Portuguesa	2023	Paulista	—		—		—		—		10	0	10	0
Portuguesa	2024	Paulista	—		11	1	—		—		—		11	1
Portuguesa	Total		—		11	1	—		—		10	0	21	1
Ituano	2024	Série B	0	0	—		—		—		—		0	0
Career total			155	6	167	2	12	0	2	0	90	3	426	11

== Honours ==
Paulista

- Copa Paulista: 2011

São Bernardo

- Campeonato Paulista Série A2: 2021
- Copa Paulista: 2021

Portuguesa

- Campeonato Paulista Série A2: 2022
