= Willian Magrão =

Brazilian footballer

Personal information
- Full name: Willian Henrique Antunes
- Date of birth: 16 February 1987 (age 39)
- Place of birth: Moji-Mirim, Brazil
- Height: 1.90 m (6 ft 3 in)
- Positions: Centre-back; defensive midfielder

Youth career
- 2005–2007: Grêmio

Senior career*
Years	Team	Apps	(Gls)
2007–2013	Grêmio	63	(7)
2012	→ Ponte Preta (loan)	13	(2)
2012	→ Cruzeiro (loan)	18	(1)
2013	→ Figueirense (loan)	19	(2)
2014	Portuguesa	10	(2)
2014	Boa Esporte	9	(0)
2015	Red Bull Brasil	12	(1)
2015	Náutico	23	(1)
2016–2017	Red Bull Brasil	22	(0)
2016	FC Juárez	27	(0)
2018	Oita Trinita	0	(0)
2019	Kagoshima United	3	(0)
2020	São Bernardo	0	(0)
2020–2021	Portuguesa	28	(2)
2022	Aparecidense	3	(0)
- * Club domestic league appearances and goals

Willian Henrique Antunes, known as Willian Magrão (born 16 February 1987), is a Brazilian former professional footballer who played as either a centre-back or a defensive midfielder.

== Career ==
Magrão signed with Náutico in 2015.

In December 2019, Magrão joined São Bernardo. However, he was yet to make his debut, before he joined Portuguesa on 21 February 2020.

== Honours ==
Grêmio

- Campeonato Gaúcho: 2007
