= Diego Augusto =

Brazilian footballer (born 1991)

Personal information
- Full name: Diego Augusto Teixeira Alves
- Date of birth: 17 May 1991 (age 35)
- Place of birth: São Paulo, Brazil
- Height: 1.86 m (6 ft 1 in)
- Position: Centre back

Team information
- Current team: Tupynambás

Youth career
- Portuguesa

Senior career*
| Years | Team | Apps | (Gls) |
| 2011–2014 | Portuguesa | 32 | (1) |
| 2015 | Ituano | 0 | (0) |
| 2016 | Ypiranga-RS | 1 | (0) |
| 2016 | Anapolina | 4 | (0) |
| 2017 | Rio Claro | 8 | (1) |
| 2017 | Mogi Mirim | 5 | (1) |
| 2018 | Sertãozinho | 10 | (0) |
| 2019 | Rio Claro | 9 | (1) |
| 2020– | Tupynambás | 6 | (0) |
- * Club domestic league appearances and goals as of 06:15, 5 August 2020 (UTC)

Diego Augusto Teixeira Alves (born 17 May 1991), known as Diego Augusto or simply Diego, is a Brazilian footballer who plays for Tupynambás as a central defender.

== Career ==
Born in São Paulo, Diego graduated from Portuguesa's youth categories, and made his first team debut on 26 November 2011, playing the last 13 minutes of a 2–0 away win over Icasa for the Série B championship. He made his Série A debut on 8 July of the following year, starting in a 0–2 away loss against Atlético Mineiro.

Diego left Lusa in December 2014, and signed for Ituano on 5 January 2015.

== Honours ==
Portuguesa

- Campeonato Brasileiro Série B: 2011
- Campeonato Paulista Série A2: 2013
