= Nerylon =

Brazilian footballer (born 1988)

Personal information
- Full name: Nerylon Ferreira de Oliveira
- Date of birth: 15 January 1988 (age 38)
- Place of birth: São Luís, Brazil
- Height: 1.74 m (5 ft 8 1/2 in)
- Positions: Right back; midfielder

Youth career
- São Paulo

Senior career*
Years	Team	Apps	(Gls)
2007	Ponte Preta	5	(0)
2007–2008	Sport Recife	12	(2)
2008–2009	Fortaleza	17	(2)
2009	→ Sete de Setembro (loan)	?	(?)
2010	Sorriso	?	(?)
2011	Campinense	?	(?)
2011	Santos B	0	(0)
2011–2012	Uberaba	6	(0)
2012	Etar 1924	9	(1)
2013–2014	Monte Azul	6	(2)
2014	Portuguesa	1	(0)
2015	Grêmio Osasco	12	(0)
2015	Juventus-SP	0	(0)
2016	Boavista	2	(0)
2017	Cascavel CR		
2018	Portuguesa Santista	0	(0)
- * Club domestic league appearances and goals as of 06:40, 5 August 2020 (UTC)

Nerylon Ferreira de Oliveira (born 15 January 1988), simply known as Nerylon, is a Brazilian footballer. Mainly a right back, he can also play as a right midfielder or winger.
