= Serginho (footballer, born 1984) =

Brazilian footballer

Personal information
- Full name: Sergio Henrique Francisco
- Date of birth: 19 December 1984 (age 41)
- Place of birth: Avaré, Brazil
- Height: 1.69 m (5 ft 7 in)
- Position: Forward

Team information
- Current team: Aurora
- Number: 77

Senior career*
Years	Team	Apps	(Gls)
2006–2009	Linense		
2009	Recreativo do Libolo		
2010	Guaratinguetá	32	(4)
2011	Mirassol	9	(2)
2012	Red Bull Brasil	20	(3)
2012	Boa Esporte	6	(0)
2013	Brasiliense	1	(0)
2013	Araxá	4	(2)
2013–2014	Mogi Mirim	20	(4)
2014–2015	Portuguesa	23	(4)
2015	Linense	13	(1)
2015–2016	Mogi Mirim	24	(2)
2016–2017	Botafogo-SP	17	(1)
2016–2017	XV de Piracicaba	2	(0)
2017–2022	Wilstermann	168	(49)
2023	Manaus	3	(0)
2023–	Aurora	42	(6)
- * Club domestic league appearances and goals as of 16 September 2020

Sergio Henrique Francisco, simply known as Serginho (born 19 December 1984), is a Brazilian professional footballer who plays as a forward for Aurora.

== Career ==
Born in Avaré, Serginho made his senior debuts with local Linense, and went on to appear several years for the side. In January 2009 he moved abroad, joining Angolan Girabola side Recreativo do Libolo.

In November Serginho returned to his homeland, joining Guaratinguetá, and featuring as a regular starter. A year later he moved to neighbouring Mirassol, but was sparingly used in the league (despite being a starter during the state leagues) and joined Red Bull Brasil. In December Serginho signed with Brasiliense, but appeared only once for the club.

In May, Serginho moved to Boa Esporte, but served mainly as a backup. In February he joined Araxá, but later moved back to his home state and joined Mogi Mirim.

On 16 May 2014, Serginho was presented at Portuguesa. On 22 December, however, he returned to his first club Linense.
