= Pedrinho (footballer, born May 1994) =

Brazilian footballer

Personal information
- Full name: Pedro Henrique de Oliveira
- Date of birth: 4 May 1994 (age 32)
- Place of birth: Planaltina, DF, Brazil
- Height: 1.80 m (5 ft 11 in)
- Position: Attacking midfielder

Team information
- Current team: OFK Grbalj

Youth career
- 2009–2014: São Paulo

Senior career*
Years	Team	Apps	(Gls)
2014–2016	São Paulo	0	(0)
2014	→ Boa Esporte (loan)	7	(1)
2015	→ América-MG (loan)	6	(0)
2015	→ Sampaio Corrêa (loan)		
2017	Cianorte	2	(0)
2017	Ituano	4	(0)
2017	Barra		
2018	CRB	1	(0)
2019–	OFK Grbalj	0	(0)
- * Club domestic league appearances and goals as of 2 December 2017

Pedro Henrique de Oliveira or simply Pedrinho (born 4 May 1994) is a Brazilian professional footballer who plays as an attacking midfielder for OFK Grbalj. In 2014, he played for Boa Esporte in Série B, also on loan.

== Career ==
Pedrinho came through the youth system of São Paulo, where he was contracted until 2016. He spent the 2014 season on loan to Série B club Boa Esporte. He played in the first seven matches of the season, scoring once, but lost his place after the domestic season was interrupted by the World Cup. He joined América Mineiro, also on loan, for the 2015 season.

In January 2019, Pedrinho joined OFK Grbalj.
