= Rudnei da Rosa =

Brazilian footballer

Rudnei
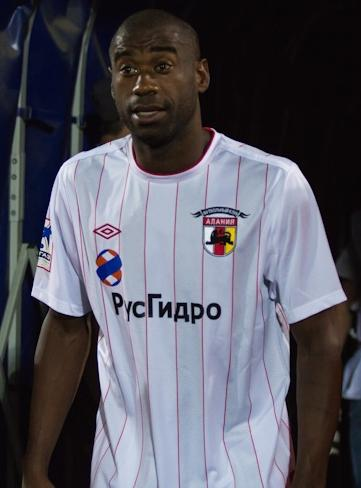
- Rudnei with Alania Vladikavkaz in 2012

Personal information
- Full name: Rudnei da Rosa
- Date of birth: 7 October 1984 (age 42)
- Place of birth: Florianópolis, Brazil
- Height: 1.88 m (6 ft 2 in)
- Position: Defensive midfielder

Youth career
- 2003–2004: Figueirense

Senior career*
| Years | Team | Apps | (Gls) |
| 2005 | Figueirense | 8 | (0) |
| 2006 | 15 de Novembro | | |
| 2006–2010 | Grêmio | 8 | (0) |
| 2007 | → Criciúma (loan) | 0 | (0) |
| 2009 | → Náutico (loan) | 11 | (0) |
| 2010 | → Avaí (loan) | 29 | (2) |
| 2011 | Ventforet Kofu | 2 | (0) |
| 2011 | Ceará | 19 | (1) |
| 2012 | Cruzeiro | 6 | (1) |
| 2012–2013 | FC Alania Vladikavkaz | 19 | (0) |
| 2014 | Portuguesa | 10 | (1) |
| 2015 | Avaí | 4 | (0) |
| 2016 | Xinjiang Tianshan Leopard | 21 | (3) |
| 2018–2019 | Hercílio Luz | 28 | (2) |
| 2021 | Inter de Lages | | |
- * Club domestic league appearances and goals

Rudnei da Rosa (born 7 October 1984), simply known as Rudnei, is a Brazilian former professional footballer who played as defensive midfielder.

== Career ==
Rudnei played in the Campeonato Brasileiro for Grêmio and Náutico.
