= Djalma (footballer, born 1988) =

Brazilian footballer

Personal information
- Full name: Nasley Airton Lisboa de Souza
- Date of birth: 15 April 1988 (age 38)
- Place of birth: Januária, Brazil
- Height: 1.79 m (5 ft 10 in)
- Position: Attacking midfielder

Youth career
- América-MG

Senior career*
Years	Team	Apps	(Gls)
2009	América-MG	0	(0)
2010	Patrocinense		
2010	Cristal	6	(1)
2011–2013	Santo André	6	(0)
2011	→ Patrocinense (loan)		
2012–2013	→ Gil Vicente (loan)	6	(0)
2013	São Paulo-RS		
2014	Novorizontino	3	(0)
2014	Jacuipense	2	(0)
2014	Portuguesa	4	(1)
2015	Guarani-MG	8	(1)
2015	Coruripe	9	(2)
2016	Taubaté	11	(1)
2017	Confiança	8	(0)
2017	Villa Nova	1	(0)
2018	ASA	15	(0)
2018	São Luiz	3	(1)
2019	Pelotas	1	(0)
2019	Patrocinense	0	(0)
2020	Guarani-MG	3	(0)
2020	America-RJ	2	(0)
2020	Canaã EC	2	(0)
2021	America-RJ	4	(0)
- * Club domestic league appearances and goals as of 20:04, 10 February 2021 (UTC)

Nasley Airton Lisboa de Souza, commonly known as Djalma (born 15 April 1988), is a Brazilian footballer who plays as an attacking midfielder.

== Career ==
Born in Januária, Minas Gerais, Djalma graduated from América-MG's youth system, and made his senior debuts with lowly locals Patrocinense. After playing for Cristal he joined Santo André, being immediately loaned back to Patrocinense.

In July 2011 Djalma returned to Ramalhão, and played for the club in Série C. On 21 August 2012 he was loaned to Portuguese Primeira Liga side Gil Vicente in a two-year deal.

On 24 September 2012 Djalma played his first match as a professional, replacing compatriot Luís Carlos in the 74th minute of a 1–2 away loss against Sporting. He only appeared in six matches during the campaign, all from the bench, and was subsequently released.

After a brief period at São Paulo-RS, Djalma joined Grêmio Novorizontino in January 2014. In July, he moved to Série D's Jacuipense.

On 15 August 2014 Djalma joined Portuguesa until the end of the year. He appeared in four matches and scored once before being left out of the squad in October.

In December 2014, after being released by Lusa, Djalma joined Guarani-MG.
