= Allan Dias (Brazilian footballer) =

Brazilian footballer (born 1988)

Personal information
- Full name: Allan Monteiro Dias
- Date of birth: October 19, 1988 (age 38)
- Place of birth: Rio de Janeiro, Brazil
- Height: 1.87 m (6 ft 1 1/2 in)
- Position: Attacking midfielder

Team information
- Current team: Athletic

Youth career
- São Paulo

Senior career*
Years	Team	Apps	(Gls)
2007–2011	São Paulo	1	(0)
2008	→ Toledo (loan)	0	(0)
2009	→ Volta Redonda (loan)	2	(1)
2009	→ Ituano (loan)	0	(0)
2010	→ Guaratinguetá (loan)	28	(5)
2010–2011	→ Santo André (loan)	20	(4)
2011–2013	São Caetano	14	(3)
2013	→ Red Bull Brasil (loan)	16	(7)
2013	Guaratinguetá	18	(2)
2014	Red Bull Brasil	17	(3)
2014	Portuguesa	22	(4)
2015	Red Bull Brasil	10	(0)
2015	Guarani	12	(2)
2016	Botafogo-SP	9	(2)
2016	Remo	11	(2)
2017	URT	14	(4)
2017	Tombense	13	(0)
2018	Botafogo-PB	31	(4)
2018	Joinville	0	(0)
2019	Santa Cruz	28	(4)
2020	Coimbra	25	(12)
2020–2021	São Bernardo	7	(3)
2021	São Bento	10	(1)
2021	Manaus	10	(1)
2021–2023	ABC	25	(12)
2023–	Athletic	2	(1)
- * Club domestic league appearances and goals as of 19:02, 14 April 2022 (UTC)

Allan Monteiro Dias (born 19 October 1988) is a Brazilian professional footballer who plays for Athletic as an attacking midfielder.

== Club career ==
Born in Rio de Janeiro, Allan Dias graduated in São Paulo FC's youth setup, appearing on the bench in a 2–0 home success against Figueirense on 28 June 2007. However, after failing to make a first-team appearance for Tricolor, he was subsequently loaned to Toledo Colônia Work, Volta Redonda, Ituano, Guaratinguetá and Santo André, respectively.

In April 2011 Allan Dias joined São Caetano. However, after being sparingly used at Azulão, he moved to Red Bull Brasil on loan in February 2013; after scoring seven times in only 16 matches, Allan Dias joined Guaratinguetá.

On 10 January 2014 Allan Dias returned to Red Bull Brasil, this time in a permanent deal. After achieving promotion with the club, he moved to Portuguesa on 24 April.

On 4 November Allan Dias rescinded with Lusa, and returned to RB Brasil eight days later.
