= Carlos Antônio (footballer, born 1989) =

Brazilian footballer

Personal information
- Full name: Carlos Antônio Ferreira de Sousa
- Date of birth: 28 April 1989 (age 37)
- Place of birth: Fortaleza, Brazil
- Height: 1.87 m (6 ft 2 in)
- Position: Defensive midfielder

Team information
- Current team: Guarany de Sobral

Senior career*
Years	Team	Apps	(Gls)
2010–2011	Guarany de Sobral	61	(0)
2010	→ América (RN) (loan)	2	(0)
2011	→ Guarani (loan)	18	(0)
2012–2013	Bahia de Feira	27	(0)
2012	→ Atlético Goianiense (loan)	10	(0)
2013–2014	Luverdense	46	(0)
2015–2016	Ceará	29	(0)
2016–2017	Cuiabá	23	(0)
2018	Maringá	19	(0)
2018	Caucaia	7	(0)
2019	Botafogo PB	1	(0)
2019	Campo Grande	4	(0)
2019–2020	Guarany de Sobral	11	(0)
2020	Portuguesa	4	(0)
2021–	Icasa	6	(0)
- * Club domestic league appearances and goals as of 11 March 2021

Carlos Antônio Ferreira de Sousa is a Brazilian footballer who plays as a defensive midfielder for Guarany de Sobral.
