= Wendell (footballer, born 1989) =

Brazilian footballer

Personal information
- Full name: Wendell Nogueira de Araújo
- Date of birth: 4 April 1989 (age 37)
- Place of birth: São Paulo
- Height: 1.70 m (5 ft 7 in)
- Position: Midfielder

Team information
- Current team: Atlético–ES

Youth career
- 2007–2008: São Caetano

Senior career*
Years	Team	Apps	(Gls)
2009–2011	São Caetano	23	(2)
2010	→ CRB (loan)	2	(0)
2011	→ Sertãozinho (loan)	0	(0)
2012	Audax	0	(0)
2012–2013	Rio Claro	0	(0)
2013	Mogi Mirim	4	(0)
2014	Rio Claro	0	(1)
2014	São Caetano	4	(0)
2015	Rio Branco	0	(0)
2015	CRAC	4	(0)
2016	Rio Preto	0	(0)
2016	São José dos Campos	0	(0)
2017–	Atlético–ES	0	(0)
- * Club domestic league appearances and goals as of 31 January 2017

Wendell Nogueira de Araújo (born 4 April 1989), simply known as Wendell, is a Brazilian footballer who plays for Atlético–ES as a midfielder.

== Career statistics ==
As of 31 January 2017

Club	Season	League			State League		Cup		Continental		Other		Total	
Club	Season	Division	Apps	Goals	Apps	Goals	Apps	Goals	Apps	Goals	Apps	Goals	Apps	Goals
São Caetano	2009	Série B	21	2	—		—		—		—		21	2
São Caetano	2010	Série B	—		11	0	—		—		—		11	0
São Caetano	2011	Série B	2	0	—		—		—		—		2	0
São Caetano	Subtotal		23	2	11	0	—		—		—		34	2
CRB	2010	Série C	2	0	—		—		—		—		2	0
Sertãozinho	2011	Paulista A2	—		11	0	—		—		—		11	0
Audax	2012	Paulista A2	—		16	2	—		—		—		16	2
Rio Claro	2012	Paulista A2	—		—		—		—		16 (Note: All appearance(s) in Copa Paulista)	5	16	5
Rio Claro	2013	Paulista A2	—		20	5	—		—		—		20	5
Rio Claro	Subtotal		—		20	5	—		—		16	5	36	10
Mogi Mirim	2013	Série C	4	0	—		—		—		—		4	0
Rio Claro	2014	Paulista	—		9	1	—		—		—		9	1
São Caetano	2014	Série B	4	0	—		—		—		—		4	0
Rio Branco	2015	Paulista A2	—		16	0	—		—		—		16	0
CRAC	2015	Série D	4	0	—		—		—		—		4	0
Rio Preto	2016	Paulista A2	—		19	1	—		—		—		19	1
São José dos Campos	2016	Paulista	—		—		—		—		10	0	10	0
Atlético–ES	2017	Capixaba	—		1	0	—		—		—		1	0
Career total			37	2	103	9	0	0	0	0	26	5	166	16
