= Gustavo Tabalipa =

Brazilian footballer (born 1993)

Personal information
- Full name: Gustavo André Tabalipa
- Date of birth: 28 January 1993 (age 33)
- Place of birth: Rolim de Moura, Brazil
- Height: 1.85 m (6 ft 1 in)
- Position: Centre back

Youth career
- 2006–2009: Goiás
- 2009–2011: Internacional
- 2011: Santos
- 2012–2013: Portuguesa

Senior career*
| Years | Team | Apps | (Gls) |
| 2013–2015 | Portuguesa | 14 | (0) |
| 2016 | Bragantino | 2 | (0) |
| Total | | 16 | (0) |
- * Club domestic league appearances and goals as of 25 May 2015

Gustavo André Tabalipa, known as Gustavo Tabalipa or simply Gustavo (born 28 January 1993), is a Brazilian retired footballer who played as a central defender.

== Career ==
Born in Rolim de Moura, Gustavo Tabalipa graduated from Portuguesa's youth categories, after representing Goiás, Internacional and Santos. He made his first team – and Série A – debut on 18 August 2013, starting in a 1–3 home loss against Botafogo.

In the 2014 summer Gustavo Tabalipa suffered a serious knee injury, being sidelined for the remainder of the season. He returned to the fields in the following year, but appeared rarely before being released on 12 June 2015.

On 2 January 2016 Gustavo Tabalipa joined Bragantino. After only two appearances, he left the club and subsequently retired from professional football, later starting a medical degree.
