= André Vinicius =

Brazilian footballer (born 1991)

Personal information
- Full name: André Vinicius Lima Oliveira
- Date of birth: July 30, 1991 (age 35)
- Place of birth: São Paulo, Brazil
- Height: 1.88 m (6 ft 2 in)
- Position: Centre back

Team information
- Current team: Oeste

Youth career
- 2006–2010: Corinthians

Senior career*
| Years | Team | Apps | (Gls) |
| 2010–2016 | Corinthians | 0 | (0) |
| 2010 | → Nacional-SP (loan) | 0 | (0) |
| 2011 | → Paraná (loan) | 1 | (0) |
| 2012 | → Bragantino (loan) | 11 | (2) |
| 2013 | → Bragantino (loan) | 7 | (1) |
| 2014 | → Portuguesa (loan) | 0 | (0) |
| 2014 | → Paraná (loan) | 1 | (0) |
| 2014 | → União Madeira (loan) | 13 | (0) |
| 2015 | → Bragantino (loan) | 0 | (0) |
| 2015–2016 | → Audax (loan) | 0 | (0) |
| 2016 | CRB | 0 | (0) |
| 2017–2018 | Oeste | 10 | (0) |
| 2020– | Oeste | 17 | (0) |

International career
| 2010 | Brazil U20 | 1 | (0) |
- * Club domestic league appearances and goals as of 03:47, 16 April 2022 (UTC)

André Vinicius Lima Oliveira, simply known as André Vinicius (born 30 July 1991), is a Brazilian footballer who plays for Oeste as a central defender.

== Career ==
André Vinicius began his career in the youth of Corinthians. Copa São Paulo de Juniores in 2009 and featured in the junior team of Corinthians in 2010, was named by coach Mano Menezes to integrate the core team of Corinthians.

=== Career statistics ===
(Correct as of October 16, 2010)

| Club | Season | State League | | Brazilian Série A | | Brazilian Série B | | Copa do Brasil | | Copa Libertadores | | Copa Sudamericana | | Friendly | | Total | |
| Club | Season | Apps | Goals | Apps | Goals | Apps | Goals | Apps | Goals | Apps | Goals | Apps | Goals | Apps | Goals | Apps | Goals |
|---|---|---|---|---|---|---|---|---|---|---|---|---|---|---|---|---|---|
| Corinthians | 2011 | 0 | 0 | 0 | 0 | 0 | 0 | 0 | 0 | 0 | 0 | 0 | 0 | 1 | 0 | 1 | 0 |
| Paraná | 2012 | 0 | 0 | 0 | 0 | 1 | 0 | 6 | 0 | 0 | 0 | 0 | 0 | 0 | 0 | 7 | 0 |
| Bragantino | 2012 | 0 | 0 | 0 | 0 | 11 | 2 | 0 | 0 | 0 | 0 | 0 | 0 | 0 | 0 | 11 | 2 |
| Corinthians | 2013 | 1 | 0 | 0 | 0 | 0 | 0 | 0 | 0 | 0 | 0 | 0 | 0 | 0 | 0 | 1 | 0 |
| Total | | 1 | 0 | 0 | 0 | 12 | 2 | 6 | 0 | 0 | 0 | 0 | 0 | 1 | 0 | 20 | 2 |

== Honours ==
Corinthians Paulista

- Campeonato Paulista Infantil: 2006
- Copa São Paulo de Juniores: 2009
- Campeonato Paulista: 2013

== Contract ==
- Contract with Corintios until February 9, 2015.
