= Mateus (footballer, born June 1983) =

Brazilian footballer

Personal information
- Full name: Mateus Alonso Honorio
- Date of birth: 16 June 1983 (age 43)
- Place of birth: Pedregulho, Brazil
- Height: 1.86 m (6 ft 1 in)
- Position: Defender

Youth career
- 1998–2000: Francana

Senior career*
Years	Team	Apps	(Gls)
2000–2002	Mirassol		
2003–2004	Juventude		
2005	Rio Branco-SP	24	(0)
2005–2006	Vaduz	13	(0)
2006–2007	Santo André		
2007	Taubaté		
2007–2008	Ankaragücü	1	(0)
2008	Francana		
2008	CRB		
2008–2009	Steel Azin		
2009–2010	Nassaji Mazandaran		
2010–2011	Steel Azin	13	(0)
2011–2013	FC Linth 04	26	(1)
2013	Francana	8	(0)
2013–2014	Triesenberg		
2014	Inter de Limeira	16	(0)
2014	Portuguesa	12	(0)
2015	Atlético Goianiense	11	(0)
- * Club domestic league appearances and goals

Mateus Alonso Honorio, simply known as Mateus (born 16 June 1983), is a Brazilian retired professional footballer. Mainly a central defender, he could also play as a right-back or defensive midfielder. He was a very aggressive player
