= Danilo Alves (footballer, born 1996) =

Brazilian footballer

Personal information
- Full name: Danilo Alves Rodrigues
- Date of birth: 15 April 1996 (age 30)
- Place of birth: Boa Vista, Roraima, Brazil
- Height: 1.78 m (5 ft 10 in)
- Position: Winger

Youth career
- 2012: Ovel
- 2013–2014: Vila Nova

Senior career*
Years	Team	Apps	(Gls)
2014–2015	Vila Nova	1	(0)
2016	Trindade	12	(2)
2016–2018	Grêmio Anápolis	0	(0)
2016–2018	→ Penafiel (loan)	15	(1)
2018	→ Novo Horizonte (loan)	0	(0)
2019	Tupy	0	(0)
- * Club domestic league appearances and goals as of 21:26, 22 April 2020 (UTC)

Danilo Alves Rodrigues (born 15 April 1996) is a Brazilian football player.

== Club career ==
He made his professional debut in the Segunda Liga for Penafiel on 21 December 2016 in a game against Leixões.
