= Bryan Aldave =

Uruguayan footballer (born 1983)

Personal information
- Full name: Bryan Maximiliano Aldave Benítez
- Date of birth: 29 September 1983 (age 43)
- Place of birth: Montevideo, Uruguay
- Height: 1.87 m (6 ft 2 in)
- Position: Forward

Team information
- Current team: Cultural Santa Rosa

Youth career
- Montevideo Wanderers

Senior career*
Years	Team	Apps	(Gls)
2000–2003	Montevideo Wanderers		
2004	Rocha	16	(0)
2005	Estudiantes de Mérida		
2005	Cobreloa		
2006–2007	Rocha	21	(1)
2007–2008	Trujillanos	13	(0)
2008–2009	Sundowns	11	(3)
2009–2010	Estudiantes de Mérida	40	(13)
2010–2011	Zamora	12	(1)
2011–2012	Nacional Potosí	22	(11)
2012	Deportivo Pasto	1	(0)
2012–2013	Sud América	6	(4)
2013	Monagas	16	(5)
2013–2014	Fénix	5	(1)
2014	Nacional Potosí	21	(9)
2014	Portuguesa	7	(0)
2014–2015	Persiba Balikpapan	8	(2)
2015–2016	Sud América	16	(1)
2016	Central Español	11	(3)
2016–2017	Alfredo Salinas	5	(1)
2017	Cultural Santa Rosa	0	(0)

International career
2001–2002	Uruguay U17		
2003–2005	Uruguay U20		
- * Club domestic league appearances and goals as of 30 October 2016

Bryan Maximiliano Aldave Benítez (born 29 September 1983) is a Uruguayan former footballer who played as a forward.

== Club career ==
Born in Montevideo, Aldave graduated from hometown's Montevideo Wanderers, and made his senior debuts in 2000, with the club in Segunda División Profesional. In January 2004 he joined Primera División side Rocha.

In January 2005 Aldave moved abroad for the first time of his career, signing with Venezuelan Primera División side Estudiantes de Mérida. In June, however, he moved teams and countries again, joining Cobreloa in Chilean Primera División.

Aldave returned to Uruguay in January 2006, back to former club Rocha. After 1 1/2 seasons with the club, he moved back to Venezuela, signing with Trujillanos. On 15 January 2008 Aldave left South America and joined Premier Soccer League side Mamelodi Sundowns in South Africa. Despite appearing regularly for the side, he was transfer listed in August, and subsequently left the club in January 2009, returning to Estudiantes de Mérida.

In the 2010 summer Aldave moved to fellow top divisioner Zamora; in January of the following year, however, he switched teams and countries again, joining Nacional Potosí in Liga de Fútbol Profesional Boliviano. On 7 March 2012 Aldave signed with Deportivo Pasto, but left the club in August after appearing only once, and joined Sud América, back to his homeland.

On 13 January 2013 Aldave moved to Monagas, being released on 17 June. On 14 August he signed with Fénix.

On 11 January 2014, after being sparingly used by Fénix, Aldave moved back to Nacional Potosí. After finishing the campaign as the club's topscorer, he joined Portuguesa in May, with the deal being effective in July.

On 25 December 2014, after suffering relegation with Lusa, Aldave joined Persiba Balikpapan in Indonesia. He left the club in February of the following year and returned to his home country and Sud América in the following month, with the side back to the top level.
