= Augusto (footballer, born 1985) =

Brazilian footballer

Personal information
- Full name: José Augusto Cestari Ramos
- Date of birth: February 3, 1985 (age 41)
- Place of birth: Campinas, Brazil
- Height: 1.73 m (5 ft 8 in)
- Position: Defender

Team information
- Current team: ASA

Senior career*
Years	Team	Apps	(Gls)
2009	Fluminense	3	(0)
2010	Ceará		
2010	Comercial-SP		
2011	Monte Azul		
2011	Tupi	14	(2)
2012–	ASA		
- * Club domestic league appearances and goals as of 23:05, 25 November 2011 (UTC)

José Augusto Cestari Ramos, known as Augusto (Campinas, February 3, 1985), is a Brazilian footballer who currently plays for Agremiação Sportiva Arapiraquense.
