= Glédson (footballer, born 1983) =

Brazilian footballer

Personal information
- Full name: Glédson Ribeiro dos Santos
- Date of birth: 6 February 1983 (age 43)
- Place of birth: Almenara, Brazil
- Height: 1.92 m (6 ft 3 1/2 in)
- Position: Goalkeeper

Youth career
- 1997–2000: Náutico
- 2001–2003: São Bernardo

Senior career*
Years	Team	Apps	(Gls)
2004–2006	São Bernardo		
2005	→ Marcílio Dias (loan)		
2006	União Suzano		
2007	Cascavel		
2007	Paysandu		
2008	Oeste		
2008	Santa Cruz		
2009–2011	Náutico	76	(0)
2012	Boa Esporte	11	(0)
2012–2014	Portuguesa	54	(0)
2015–2017	Campinense	55	(0)
2017–2018	Caxias	25	(0)
2019	América-RN	3	(0)
2019–2022	Avaí	88	(0)
2023	Oeste	8	(0)
2025	Blumenau	6	(0)
- * Club domestic league appearances and goals as of 06:00, 5 August 2020 (UTC)

Glédson Ribeiro dos Santos (born 6 February 1983), simply known as Glédson, is a Brazilian footballer who plays for as a goalkeeper.

== Club career ==
Born in Almenara, Minas Gerais, Gledson graduated from São Bernardo FC's youth system. He made his first team debuts in 2004, and after a short loan spell at Marcílio Dias in 2005, joined União Suzano in 2006.

After appearing mainly in the lower levels, notably representing Paysandu and Santa Cruz, Gledson moved to Náutico in January 2009. Initially a third-choice, he made his Série A debut on 29 July 2009, starting in a 1–2 home loss against Santos.

After losing his starting spot in 2011, Gledson left the club in December, and signed for Boa Esporte on 18 January 2012. On 30 April, after appearing regularly in Campeonato Mineiro, he moved to Portuguesa.

== Honours ==
Santa Cruz

- Copa Pernambuco: 2008

Náutico

- Copa Pernambuco: 2011

Portuguesa

- Campeonato Paulista Série A2: 2013

Campinense

- Campeonato Paraibano: 2015, 2016

Avaí

- Campeonato Catarinense: 2019, 2021
