= Dejair (footballer, born 1994) =

Brazilian footballer

Personal information
- Full name: Dejair Igor Silvério Ribeiro
- Date of birth: 30 November 1994 (age 31)
- Place of birth: Contagem, Brazil
- Position: Defensive midfielder

Youth career
- Portuguesa

Senior career*
| Years | Team | Apps | (Gls) |
| 2013–2014 | Portuguesa | 7 | (0) |
| 2015 | Tombense | 8 | (0) |
| 2016 | Paulista | 0 | (0) |
| 2016 | São José dos Campos | 8 | (0) |
- * Club domestic league appearances and goals as of 3 April 2016

Dejair Igor Silvério Ribeiro, simply known as Dejair (born 30 November 1994), is a Brazilian footballer who plays as a defensive midfielder.

== Club career ==
Born in Contagem, Dejair finished his graduation at Portuguesa's youth setup, and made his first-team debut on 28 April 2013, coming on as a late substitute in a 4–1 home success against Catanduvense, in that year's Campeonato Paulista Série A2, which Lusa was crowned champions.

After returning to the youth setup in January 2014, he played his second match for Portuguesa on 5 February 2014, playing the last 22 minutes of a 3–1 win at Atlético Sorocaba. He was released in December 2014, after the expiry of his contract.
