= Zé Augusto (footballer, born 1959) =

Brazilian footballer and manager

Personal information
- Full name: José Augusto Borges Nascimento
- Date of birth: March 7, 1959 (age 67)
- Place of birth: Cruz das Almas, Brazil
- Height: 1.75 m (5 ft 9 in)
- Position: Attacking midfielder

Team information
- Current team: Portuguesa (youth coach)

Youth career
- 1980: Atlético Alagoinhas

Senior career*
Years	Team	Apps	(Gls)
1981–1991	Vitória		
1985	→ Joinville (loan)		
1987	→ Confiança (loan)		
1988	→ ASA (loan)		
1989	→ River (loan)		
1991–1992	Pinhalense	77	(50)

Managerial career
- 2007: Corinthians (caretaker)
- 2013–2014: Grêmio Osasco
- 2014: Portuguesa (caretaker)
- 2015: Portuguesa (caretaker)
- * Club domestic league appearances and goals

José Augusto Borges Nascimento, commonly known as Zé Augusto (born 7 March 1959), is a Brazilian retired footballer who played as an attacking midfielder, and the current manager of Portuguesa under-20s.

== Club career ==
Born in Cruz das Almas, Bahia, Zé Augusto started his career in Atlético Alagoinhas, and later moved to state giants Vitória in 1981. He remained in the club for five years before serving loans at Joinville, Confiança, ASA de Arapiraca and River.

Zé Augusto retired in 1992, aged 33, due to a knee injury while playing for Pinhalense.

== Managerial career ==
Shortly after retiring, Zé Augusto was appointed as a youth manager in his last club Pinhalense. In 1994, he moved to former club Vitória, helping in the promotions of Vampeta, Dida and Fábio Costa.

Shortly after leaving Vitória, Zé Augusto moved to Mogi Mirim, again assigned to the youth setup. He was later appointed at the helm of Corinthians, initially to their youth squads.

Zé Augusto appointed caretaker manager of Corinthians in April 2007, after the dismissal of Emerson Leão. He later returned to the youth setup after the signing of Paulo César Carpegiani, but returned to first-team duties in August, after the latter was relieved.

Zé Augusto was dismissed from the first-team on 25 September 2009, after losing to Palmeiras. He returned to the youth squads, and was dismissed in November 2012, after being "farmed" to Flamengo de Guarulhos.

In April 2013 Zé Augusto joined Grêmio Osasco. Initially assigned to the youth setup, he was appointed first-team manager in November.

On 19 August 2014 Zé Augusto joined Portuguesa under-20s. On 12 September, after the dismissal of Paulo Silas, he was appointed as the first-team's caretaker manager, but his reign only lasted one match.
