= 2015 Associação Portuguesa de Desportos season =

Portuguesa
2015 season
- President: Jorge Gonçalves
- Coach: Estevam Soares
- Stadium: Canindé
- Série C: Quarter-finals
- Campeonato Paulista: 18th (relegated)
- Copa do Brasil: 2nd Round
- Top goalscorer: League: Guilherme Queiróz (12); All: Guilherme Queiróz (12)
Home colours	Away colours	Third colours

The 2015 season is Associação Portuguesa de Desportos' ninety fourth season in existence and the club's first consecutive season in the third level of Brazilian football, also the first in their history. On 20 March, president Ilídio Lico resigned as a president, being replaced by Jorge Manuel Marques Gonçalves.

On 8 April, after a 0–3 away defeat against São Paulo, Portuguesa was again relegated to Campeonato Paulista Série A2 for the third time in its history.

== Players ==
=== Squad information ===
As of 19 October 2015

Name	Pos.	Nat.	Place of birth	Date of birth (age)	Club caps	Club goals	Signed from	Date signed	Fee	Contract End
Goalkeepers
Anderson	GK	(Brazil)	Recife (Pernambuco)	20 November 1983 (aged 32)	6	0	Linense	18 August 2015	Free	30 May 2016
Douglas Lima	GK	(Brazil)	Salvador (Bahia)	26 August 1992 (aged 23)	1	0	Youth System	6 January 2012	Free	30 April 2016
Tom	GK	(Brazil)	Aracaju (Sergipe)	30 October 1991 (aged 24)	21	0	Youth System	1 January 2011	Free	31 December 2015
Defenders
Anderson Luiz	CB	(Brazil)	Rio de Janeiro (Rio de Janeiro (state))	18 April 1982 (aged 33)	16	1	Boavista-RJ	6 May 2015	Free	30 November 2015
Bruno	CB	(Brazil)	Paiçandu (Paraná (state))	9 June 1996 (aged 19)	–	–	Youth System	15 September 2015	Free	31 December 2018
Guilherme Almeida	CB	(Brazil)	Osasco (São Paulo (state))	29 January 1993 (aged 22)	19	1	Tokyo Verdy (Japan)	5 January 2015	Free	30 November 2015
Gustavo Lazzaretti	CB	(Brazil)	Curitiba (Paraná (state))	9 March 1984 (aged 31)	–	–	J. Malucelli	6 September 2015	Free	30 November 2015
Gustavo Tabalipa	CB	(Brazil)	Rolim de Moura (Rondônia)	28 January 1993 (aged 22)	13	0	Youth System	1 August 2013	Free	2 December 2015
Luan Peres	CB/LB	(Brazil)	São Caetano do Sul (São Paulo (state))	19 July 1994 (aged 21)	18	0	Youth System	2 September 2014	Free	30 June 2018
Dieyson	LB	(Brazil)	Itacurubi (Rio Grande do Sul)	30 June 1993 (aged 22)	11	0	Icasa	6 May 2015	Free	30 November 2015
Jonathan	RB	(Brazil)	Brasília (Federal District (Brazil))	25 August 1992 (aged 23)	14	1	Ponte Preta	20 May 2015	Loan	30 November 2015
Julinho	LB	(Brazil)	Bagé (Rio Grande do Sul)	21 July 1987 (aged 28)	14	1	Capivariano	20 May 2015	Free	30 November 2015
Osvaldir	RB	(Brazil)	Ipatinga (Minas Gerais)	15 May 1987 (aged 28)	4	0	Campinense	16 June 2015	Free	30 November 2015
Midfielders
Boquita	DM	(Brazil)	São Paulo (São Paulo (state))	7 April 1990 (aged 25)	72	2	Marília	11 August 2015	Free	30 November 2015
Caíque	DM	(Brazil)	Guarulhos (São Paulo (state))	10 October 1995 (aged 20)	3	0	Youth System	5 January 2015	Free	4 January 2017
Ferdinando	DM/LB	(Brazil)	Grajaú (Maranhão)	22 April 1980 (aged 35)	121	2	Free agent	11 August 2015	Free	30 November 2015
Milton Júnior	DM	(Brazil)	Nova Andradina (Mato Grosso do Sul)	7 March 1991 (aged 24)	11	1	Ferroviária	1 June 2015	Free	30 November 2015
Renan Teixeira	DM	(Brazil)	Caieiras (São Paulo (state))	21 March 1985 (aged 30)	18	1	São Bento	8 May 2015	Free	30 April 2016
Ronaldo	DM	(Brazil)	Capivari (São Paulo (state))	27 January 1995 (aged 20)	–	–	Youth System	31 July 2015	Free	31 December 2015
Victor Bolt	DM/CM	(Brazil)	Rio de Janeiro (Rio de Janeiro (state))	14 April 1987 (aged 28)	15	0	Vasco	17 May 2015	Loan	31 December 2015
Vinicius	DM	(Brazil)	São Paulo (São Paulo (state))	30 April 1996 (aged 19)	8	0	Youth System	14 May 2015	Free	31 December 2016
Bruno Xavier	AM	(Brazil)	São Paulo (São Paulo (state))	27 November 1996 (aged 19)	2	0	Youth System	8 June 2015	Free	31 May 2018
Diego Souza	AM	(Brazil)	Bariri (São Paulo (state))	16 January 1993 (aged 22)	2	0	Palmeiras	20 May 2015	Loan	31 December 2015
Dieguinho	AM	(Brazil)	Nova Iguaçu (Rio de Janeiro (state))	16 April 1990 (aged 25)	18	1	Nova Iguaçu	12 May 2015	Loan	30 November 2015
Formiga	AM	(Brazil)	Araçatuba (São Paulo (state))	21 March 1995 (aged 20)	1	0	Youth System	13 January 2015	Free	30 November 2015
Forwards
Diego Gonçalves	SS/AM/LW	(Brazil)	Guarujá (São Paulo (state))	22 July 1994 (aged 21)	20	4	Olhanense (Portugal)	5 January 2015	Free	30 November 2015
Guilherme Queiróz	ST/SS	(Brazil)	Novo Horizonte (São Paulo (state))	23 May 1990 (aged 25)	19	12	Novorizontino	12 May 2015	Free	30 November 2015
Igor	ST/SS	(Brazil)	Cuiabá (Mato Grosso)	16 December 1989 (aged 25)	5	0	CRB	12 June 2015	Free	30 November 2015
Hugo	ST	(Brazil)	São Fidélis (Rio de Janeiro (state))	6 January 1986 (aged 29)	21	7	Fagiano Okayama (Japan)	5 January 2015	Free	30 November 2015
Johnathan	SS	(Brazil)	São Paulo (São Paulo (state))	8 January 1992 (aged 23)	–	–	Bragantino	15 September 2015	Free	31 May 2016
Paulinho	SS	(Brazil)	São Paulo (São Paulo (state))	29 May 1993 (aged 22)	9	2	Corinthians	23 July 2015	Free	31 December 2015
Willen	SS/ST	(Brazil)	Rio de Janeiro (Rio de Janeiro (state))	10 January 1992 (aged 23)	9	1	Capivariano	19 May 2015	Loan	30 November 2015

==== Youth players ====
Note: Flags indicate national team as defined under FIFA eligibility rules; some limited exceptions apply. Players may hold more than one non-FIFA nationality.

No.	Pos.	Nation	Player
—	GK	BRA	Farley
—	DF	BRA	Cassius

No.	Pos.	Nation	Player
—	DF	BRA	Jeferson
—	MF	BRA	Rafael Vicentini

=== Appearances and goals ===
Pos.	Nat	Name	Brasileiro Série C		Campeonato Paulista		Copa do Brasil		Total	
Pos.	Nat	Name	Apps	Goals	Apps	Goals	Apps	Goals	Apps	Goals
GK	(Brazil)	Anderson	6	0	0	0	0	0	6	0
GK	(Brazil)	Douglas Lima	1	0	0	0	0	0	1	0
GK	(Brazil)	Tom	7	0	0	0	2	0	9	0
DF	(Brazil)	Anderson Luiz	15+1	1	0	0	0	0	16	1
DF	(Brazil)	Bruno	0	0	0	0	0	0	0	0
DF	(Brazil)	Guilherme Almeida	2+5	0	9	1	3	0	19	1
DF	(Brazil)	Gustavo Lazzaretti	0	0	0	0	0	0	0	0
DF	(Brazil)	Gustavo Tabalipa	2	0	0	0	0	0	2	0
DF	(Brazil)	Luan Peres	15	0	1	0	2	0	18	0
DF	(Brazil)	Dieyson	6+5	0	0	0	0	0	11	0
DF	(Brazil)	Jonathan	13+1	1	0	0	0	0	14	1
DF	(Brazil)	Julinho	14	1	0	0	0	0	14	1
DF	(Brazil)	Osvaldir	4	0	0	0	0	0	4	0
MF	(Brazil)	Boquita	1+2	0	0	0	0	0	3	0
MF	(Brazil)	Caíque	0	0	1+1	0	0+1	0	3	0
MF	(Brazil)	Ferdinando	0	0	14	0	0	0	14	0
MF	(Brazil)	Milton Júnior	10+1	1	0	0	0	0	11	1
MF	(Brazil)	Renan Teixeira	18	1	0	0	0	0	18	1
MF	(Brazil)	Ronaldo	0	0	0	0	0	0	0	0
MF	(Brazil)	Victor Bolt	15	0	0	0	0	0	15	0
MF	(Brazil)	Vinicius	6+2	0	0	0	0	0	8	0
MF	(Brazil)	Bruno Xavier	0+2	0	0	0	0	0	2	0
MF	(Brazil)	Diego Souza	0+2	0	0	0	0	0	2	0
MF	(Brazil)	Dieguinho	12+6	1	0	0	0	0	18	1
MF	(Brazil)	Formiga	0	0	0	0	0+1	0	1	0
FW	(Brazil)	Diego Gonçalves	1+4	0	9+4	3	2	1	20	4
FW	(Brazil)	Guilherme Queiróz	19	12	0	0	0	0	19	12
FW	(Brazil)	Igor	0+5	0	0	0	0	0	5	0
FW	(Brazil)	Hugo	18+1	7	0	0	2	0	21	7
FW	(Brazil)	Johnathan	0	0	0	0	0	0	0	0
FW	(Brazil)	Paulinho	7+2	2	0	0	0	0	9	2
FW	(Brazil)	Willen	1+8	1	0	0	0	0	9	1
Players who left the club during the season
GK	(Brazil)	Felipe	6	0	0	0	0	0	6	0
GK	(Brazil)	Rafael Santos	0	0	15	0	1	0	16	0
DF	(Brazil)	Alex Lima	0	0	7+1	1	1	0	9	1
DF	(Brazil)	Bolívar	10	0	0	0	0	0	10	0
DF	(Brazil)	Perema	0	0	0+1	0	0	0	1	0
DF	(Brazil)	Valdomiro	0	0	14	1	2	0	16	1
DF	(Brazil)	Bruno Bertucci	0	0	3+2	0	0	0	5	0
DF	(Brazil)	Fabinho Capixaba	0	0	10	0	2	0	12	0
DF	(Brazil)	Filipi Souza	0	0	11+2	1	1	0	14	1
DF	(Brazil)	Gustavo Cascardo	1+3	0	0+1	0	0	0	5	0
DF	(Brazil)	Paulo Henrique	0	0	11+1	0	1	0	13	0
MF	(Brazil)	Betinho	0	0	12+2	0	3	0	17	0
MF	(Brazil)	Levi	3+1	0	0	0	0	0	4	0
MF	(Brazil)	Marcelo Rosa	1+1	0	0	0	0	0	2	0
MF	(Uruguay)	Bruno Piñatares	0	0	2+2	0	1+1	0	6	0
MF	(Brazil)	Renan Souza	2	0	1+1	0	2	1	6	1
MF	(Bolivia)	Rudy Cardozo	0	0	2+4	0	1	0	7	0
MF	(Brazil)	Cleiton	1	0	0+6	0	1	0	8	0
MF	(Brazil)	Francisco Alex	2+5	0	0	0	0	0	7	0
MF	(Brazil)	Jean Mota	0	0	0+8	1	0+1	0	9	1
MF	(Brazil)	Léo Costa	0	0	15	2	3	1	18	3
FW	(Brazil)	Edno	0	0	13	0	0	0	13	0
FW	(Brazil)	Júnior Alves	0	0	0	0	0	0	0	0
FW	(Brazil)	Jussa	0	0	1+1	0	1	0	3	0
FW	(Brazil)	Marcelinho	1+1	1	0+4	0	2+1	0	9	1
FW	(Brazil)	Michel	0	0	0	0	0+2	0	2	0
FW	(Brazil)	Matheus Ortigoza	0	0	6+1	2	1+1	2	9	4
FW	(Brazil)	Popó	0	0	8+1	0	0	0	9	0

Last updated: 19 October 2015
Source: Match reports in Competitive matches, Soccerway

=== Goalscorers ===
Ran	Pos	Nat	Name	Série C	Paulistão	Copa do Brasil	Total
1	FW	(Brazil)	Guilherme Queiróz	12	0	0	12
2	FW	(Brazil)	Hugo	7	0	0	7
3	FW	(Brazil)	Diego Gonçalves	0	3	1	4
3	FW	(Brazil)	Matheus Ortigoza	0	2	2	4
4	MF	(Brazil)	Léo Costa	0	2	1	3
5	FW	(Brazil)	Paulinho	2	0	0	2
6	DF	(Brazil)	Anderson Luiz	1	0	0	1
6	DF	(Brazil)	Jonathan	1	0	0	1
6	DF	(Brazil)	Julinho	1	0	0	1
6	MF	(Brazil)	Dieguinho	1	0	0	1
6	MF	(Brazil)	Milton Júnior	1	0	0	1
6	MF	(Brazil)	Renan Teixeira	1	0	0	1
6	FW	(Brazil)	Marcelinho	1	0	0	1
6	FW	(Brazil)	Willen	1	0	0	1
6	DF	(Brazil)	Alex Lima	0	1	0	1
6	DF	(Brazil)	Guilherme Almeida	0	1	0	1
6	DF	(Brazil)	Filipi Souza	0	1	0	1
6	DF	(Brazil)	Valdomiro	0	1	0	1
6	MF	(Brazil)	Jean Mota	0	1	0	1
6	MF	(Brazil)	Renan Souza	0	0	1	1
	Own goals			1	1	0	2
Total				29	13	5	47

Last updated: 19 October 2015
Source: Match reports in Competitive matches

=== Disciplinary record ===
Nat	Pos	Name	Série C			Copa do Brasil			Paulista			Total		
Nat	Pos	Name	Yellow card	(yellow card) (yellow-red card)	Red card	Yellow card	(yellow card) (yellow-red card)	Red card	Yellow card	(yellow card) (yellow-red card)	Red card	Yellow card	(yellow card) (yellow-red card)	Red card
(Brazil)	MF	Victor Bolt	6	0	1	0	0	0	0	0	0	6	0	1
(Brazil)	MF	Milton Júnior	5	0	0	0	0	0	0	0	0	5	0	0
(Brazil)	DF	Guilherme Almeida	1	0	0	2	0	0	2	0	0	5	0	0
(Brazil)	MF	Renan Teixeira	4	1	0	0	0	0	0	0	0	4	1	0
(Brazil)	FW	Hugo	4	0	1	0	0	0	0	0	0	4	0	1
(Brazil)	DF	Luan Peres	4	0	0	0	0	0	0	0	0	4	0	0
(Brazil)	MF	Betinho	0	0	0	0	0	0	4	0	0	4	0	0
(Brazil)	DF	Valdomiro	0	0	0	1	0	0	3	0	0	4	0	0
(Brazil)	FW	Popó	0	0	0	0	0	0	3	1	0	3	1	0
(Brazil)	DF	Bolívar	3	0	0	0	0	0	0	0	0	3	0	0
(Brazil)	MF	Dieguinho	3	0	0	0	0	0	0	0	0	3	0	0
(Brazil)	MF	Renan Souza	2	0	0	1	0	0	0	0	0	3	0	0
(Brazil)	FW	Matheus Ortigoza	0	0	0	0	0	0	3	0	0	3	0	0
(Brazil)	FW	Diego Gonçalves	1	0	0	0	0	0	2	0	0	3	0	0
(Brazil)	DF	Alex Lima	0	0	0	0	0	0	2	1	0	2	1	0
(Brazil)	DF	Filipi Souza	0	0	0	0	0	0	2	1	0	2	1	0
(Brazil)	DF	Anderson Luiz	2	0	0	0	0	0	0	0	0	2	0	0
(Brazil)	DF	Julinho	2	0	0	0	0	0	0	0	0	2	0	0
(Brazil)	FW	Guilherme Queiróz	2	0	0	0	0	0	0	0	0	2	0	0
(Brazil)	MF	Léo Costa	0	0	0	1	0	0	1	0	0	2	0	0
(Brazil)	DF	Fabinho Capixaba	0	0	0	0	0	0	1	0	1	1	0	1
(Brazil)	MF	Ferdinando	0	0	0	0	0	0	1	0	1	1	0	1
(Brazil)	FW	Edno	0	0	0	0	0	0	1	0	1	1	0	1
(Brazil)	DF	Gustavo Cascardo	1	1	0	0	0	0	0	0	0	1	1	0
(Brazil)	GK	Anderson	1	0	0	0	0	0	0	0	0	1	0	0
(Brazil)	GK	Felipe	1	0	0	0	0	0	0	0	0	1	0	0
(Brazil)	GK	Tom	1	0	0	0	0	0	0	0	0	1	0	0
(Brazil)	DF	Dieyson	1	0	0	0	0	0	0	0	0	1	0	0
(Brazil)	MF	Levi	1	0	0	0	0	0	0	0	0	1	0	0
(Brazil)	MF	Vinicius	1	0	0	0	0	0	0	0	0	1	0	0
(Brazil)	FW	Igor	1	0	0	0	0	0	0	0	0	1	0	0
(Brazil)	FW	Marcelinho	1	0	0	0	0	0	0	0	0	1	0	0
(Brazil)	GK	Rafael Santos	0	0	0	0	0	0	1	0	0	1	0	0
(Brazil)	DF	Bruno Bertucci	0	0	0	0	0	0	1	0	0	1	0	0
(Brazil)	DF	Paulo Henrique	0	0	0	0	0	0	1	0	0	1	0	0
(Brazil)	MF	Jean Mota	0	0	0	0	0	0	1	0	0	1	0	0
(Bolivia)	MF	Rudy Cardozo	0	0	0	0	0	0	1	0	0	1	0	0
(Brazil)	GK	Tom	0	0	0	1	0	0	0	0	0	1	0	0
(Brazil)	MF	Cleiton	0	0	0	1	0	0	0	0	0	1	0	0
(Uruguay)	MF	Bruno Piñatares	0	0	0	1	0	0	0	0	0	1	0	0
TOTALS			44	2	2	8	0	0	30	3	2	82	5	4

As of 19 October 2015
Source: Match reports in Competitive matches (yellow card) = Number of bookings; (yellow card) (yellow-red card) = Number of sending offs after a second yellow card; (red card) = Number of sending offs by a direct red card.

== Managers ==
Name	Nat.	Place of birth	Date of birth (age)	Signed from	Date signed	Role	Departure	Manner	Contract End
Ailton Silva	(Brazil)	São Paulo (São Paulo (state))	31 October 1966 (age 60)	Free agent	15 December 2014	Permanent	6 April 2015	Sacked	31 December 2015
Zé Augusto	(Brazil)	Cruz das Almas (Bahia)	7 March 1959 (age 67)	Staff	6 April 2015	Interim	14 April 2015	Ended tenure	31 December 2015
Gerson Sodré	(Brazil)	Itabuna (Bahia)	14 July 1957 (age 69)	Staff	14 April 2015	Interim	24 April 2015	Ended tenure	31 December 2015
Júnior Lopes	(Brazil)	Rio de Janeiro (Rio de Janeiro (state))	22 November 1973 (age 52)	Tombense	21 April 2015	Permanent	29 June 2015	Sacked	31 December 2015
Estevam Soares	(Brazil)	Cafelândia (São Paulo (state))	10 June 1956 (age 70)	Rio Claro	30 June 2015	Permanent			31 December 2015

== Transfers ==
=== In ===
No.	Pos.	Nat.	Name	Age	EU	Moving from	Type	Transfer window	Ends	Transfer fee	Source
		(Brazil)	Ailton Silva	48	Non-EU	Ferroviária	Job Offer	Winter	2015	Free	
	DF	(Brazil)	Bruno Bertucci	24	Non-EU	Neftçi Baku (Azerbaijan)	Transfer	Winter	2015	Free	
	DF	(Brazil)	Alex Lima	26	Non-EU	Ceará	Transfer	Winter	2015	Free	
	DF	(Brazil)	Guilherme Almeida	21	Non-EU	Tokyo Verdy (Japan)	Transfer	Winter	2015	Free	
	DF	(Brazil)	Filipi Souza	27	Non-EU	Cabofriense	Transfer	Winter	2015	Free	
	DF	(Brazil)	Paulo Henrique	21	Non-EU	Palmeiras	Transfer	Winter	2015	Free	
	MF	(Brazil)	Betinho	27	Non-EU	Boa Esporte	Transfer	Winter	2015	Free	
	MF	(Brazil)	Cleiton	22	Non-EU	Mirassol	Transfer	Winter	2015	Free	
	MF	(Brazil)	Diego Gonçalves	20	Non-EU	Atlético CP (Portugal)	Transfer	Winter	2015	Free	
	MF	(Bolivia)	Samuel Galindo	22	Non-EU	Arsenal (England)	Loan	Winter	2015	Free	
	FW	(Brazil)	Hugo	28	Non-EU	Fagiano Okayama (Japan)	Transfer	Winter	2015	Free	
	DF	(Brazil)	Fabinho Capixaba	31	Non-EU	Atlético Sorocaba	Transfer	Winter	2015	Free	
	MF	(Bolivia)	Rudy Cardozo	24	Non-EU	Bolívar (Bolivia)	Loan	Winter	2015	Free	
	DF	(Brazil)	Jeferson	19	Non-EU	Youth system	Promoted	Winter	2015	Free	
	DF	(Brazil)	Gustavo Cascardo	17	Non-EU	Youth system	Promoted	Winter	2016	Free	
	MF	(Brazil)	Formiga	19	Non-EU	Youth system	Promoted	Winter	2015	Free	
	MF	(Brazil)	Jussa	18	Non-EU	Youth system	Promoted	Winter	2015	Free	
	MF	(Brazil)	Ferdinando	34	Non-EU	Júbilo Iwata (Japan)	Transfer	Winter	2015	Free	
	FW	(Brazil)	Popó	36	Non-EU	Júbilo Iwata (Japan)	Transfer	Winter	2015	Free	
	DF	(Brazil)	Perema	22	Non-EU	São Francisco-PA	Loan	Winter	2015	Free	
	FW	(Brazil)	Edno	31	Non-EU	Vitória	Transfer	Winter	2015	Free	
	MF	(Brazil)	Giovani	21	EU	Independente de Limeira	Transfer	Winter	2016	Free	
	MF	(Brazil)	Bruno Arrabal	22	Non-EU	Remo	Transfer	Winter	2016	Free	
	FW	(Brazil)	Matheus Ortigoza	21	Non-EU	Duque de Caxias	Loan	Winter	2015	Free	
	MF	(Brazil)	Bruno Rios	25	Non-EU	Free agent	Transfer	Winter	2016	Free	
	FW	(Brazil)	Michel	34	Non-EU	Inter-SM	Transfer	During season	2016	Free	
		(Brazil)	Júnior Lopes	41	Non-EU	Tombense	Job Offer	During season	2015	Free	
	GK	(Brazil)	Felipe	27	Non-EU	Fluminense	Transfer	During season	2015	Free	
	DF	(Brazil)	Anderson Luiz	33	Non-EU	Boavista-RJ	Transfer	During season	2015	Free	
	DF	(Brazil)	Dieyson	21	Non-EU	Icasa	Transfer	During season	2015	Free	
	MF	(Brazil)	Francisco Alex	31	Non-EU	Água Santa	Transfer	During season	2015	Free	
	DF	(Brazil)	Bolívar	34	Non-EU	Botafogo	Transfer	During season	2015	Free	
	MF	(Brazil)	Renan Teixeira	30	Non-EU	São Bento	Transfer	During season	2015	Free	
	MF	(Brazil)	Marcelo Rosa	23	Non-EU	Villa Nova	Loan	During season	2015	Free	
	MF	(Brazil)	Dieguinho	25	Non-EU	Nova Iguaçu	Loan	During season	2015	Free	
	FW	(Brazil)	Guilherme Queiróz	24	Non-EU	Novorizontino	Transfer	During season	2015	Free	
	MF	(Brazil)	Victor Bolt	28	Non-EU	Vasco	Loan	During season	2015	Free	
	MF	(Brazil)	Willen	23	Non-EU	Capivariano	Loan	During season	2015	Free	
	DF	(Brazil)	Julinho	27	Non-EU	Capivariano	Transfer	During season	2015	Free	
	DF	(Brazil)	Jonathan	22	Non-EU	Ponte Preta	Loan	During season	2015	Free	
	MF	(Brazil)	Diego Souza	22	Non-EU	Palmeiras	Loan	During season	2015	Free	
	MF	(Brazil)	Milton Júnior	24	Non-EU	Ferroviária	Transfer	During season	2015	Free	
	DF	(Brazil)	Diego Rocha	23	Non-EU	Inter-SM	Transfer	During season	2015	Free	
	FW	(Brazil)	Igor	25	Non-EU	CRB	Transfer	During season	2015	Free	
	MF	(Brazil)	Levi	25	Non-EU	Comercial-SP	Transfer	During season	2015	Free	
		(Brazil)	Estevam Soares	59	Non-EU	Rio Claro	Job Offer	During season	2015	Free	
	DF	(Brazil)	Osvaldir	28	Non-EU	Campinense	Transfer	During season	2015	Free	
	FW	(Brazil)	Paulinho	22	Non-EU	Corinthians	Loan	During season	2015	Free	
	MF	(Brazil)	Ferdinando	35	Non-EU	Free agent	Transfer	During season	2015	Free	
	MF	(Brazil)	Boquita	25	Non-EU	Marília	Transfer	During season	2015	Free	
	GK	(Brazil)	Anderson	31	Non-EU	Linense	Transfer	During season	2015	Free	
	DF	(Brazil)	Gustavo Lazzaretti	31	Non-EU	J. Malucelli	Transfer	During season	2015	Free	
	FW	(Brazil)	Johnathan	23	Non-EU	Bragantino	Transfer	During season	2016	Free	

Total spending: ▼ R$ 0.00

=== Out ===
No.	Pos.	Nat.	Name	Age	EU	Moving to	Type	Transfer window	Transfer fee	Source
	DF	(Brazil)	Brinner	27	Non-EU	Macaé Esporte	Contract Ended	Winter	Free	
	MF	(Brazil)	Djalma	26	Non-EU	Guarani-MG	Contract Ended	Winter	Free	
	MF	(Brazil)	Dinélson	28	Non-EU	URT	Contract Ended	Winter	Free	
	DF	(Brazil)	Arnaldo	22	Non-EU	Penapolense (Note: On loan from Mirassol)	Contract Ended	Winter	Free	
	DF	(Brazil)	Luciano Castán	25	Non-EU	São Bernardo	Loan Return	Winter	Free	
	FW	(Brazil)	Serginho	29	Non-EU	Linense	Contract Ended	Winter	Free	
	FW	(Brazil)	Alemão	25	Non-EU	Cruz Azul (Mexico)	Loan Return	Winter	Free	
	DF	(Brazil)	Mateus Alonso	31	Non-EU	Atlético-GO	Contract Ended	Winter	Free	
	MF	(Brazil)	Diogo Orlando	31	Non-EU	Gostaresh (Iran)	Contract Ended	Winter	Free	
	MF	(Brazil)	Caio	22	Non-EU	Palmeiras	Loan Return	Winter	Free	
	FW	(Brazil)	Pedro Oldoni	29	Non-EU	Macaé Esporte	Transfer	Winter	Free	
	DF	(Brazil)	André Astorga	34	Non-EU	Caldas Novas	Contract Ended	Winter	Free	
	FW	(Brazil)	Thiago Brito	22	Non-EU	Santos	Contract Ended	Winter	Free	
	FW	(Brazil)	Jô Fernandes	22	Non-EU	São Caetano	Released	Winter	Free	
	DF	(Colombia)	Rafael Pérez	24	Non-EU	Litex Lovech (Bulgaria)	Released	Winter	Free	
	DF	(Brazil)	Lucas Caires	22	Non-EU	Free agent	Contract Ended	Winter	Free	
	DF	(Brazil)	Nerylon	26	Non-EU	Grêmio Osasco	Contract Ended	Winter	Free	
	FW	(Brazil)	Bruno Moraes	30	Non-EU	Free agent	Contract Ended	Winter	Free	
	DF	(Brazil)	Bruno Ferreira	20	Non-EU	Vasco da Gama	Contract Ended	Winter	Free	
	FW	(Uruguay)	Bryan Aldave	31	Non-EU	Persiba (Indonesia)	Released	Winter	Free	
	MF	(Brazil)	Léo Oliveira	20	Non-EU	Nacional-SP	Contract Ended	Winter	Free	
	MF	(Brazil)	Daniel Bacan	21	Non-EU	Cotia FC	Released	Winter	Free	
	MF	(Brazil)	Gabriel Modesto	21	Non-EU	Cotia FC	Released	Winter	Free	
	DF	(Brazil)	Alê	22	Non-EU	Free agent	Released	Winter	Free	
	MF	(Brazil)	Maycon	29	Non-EU	Sampaio Corrêa	Released	Winter	Free	
	MF	(Brazil)	Dejair	20	Non-EU	Tombense	Released	Winter	Free	
	MF	(Brazil)	Felipe Nunes	24	Non-EU	Capivariano (Note: On loan from Grêmio)	Contract Ended	Winter	Free	
	GK	(Brazil)	Glédson	31	Non-EU	Campinense	Released	Winter	Free	
	DF	(Brazil)	Diego Augusto	23	Non-EU	Ituano	Contract Ended	Winter	Free	
	FW	(Brazil)	Luan	18	Non-EU	Grêmio	Released	Winter	Free	
	MF	(Bolivia)	Samuel Galindo	22	Non-EU	Arsenal (England)	Loan Return	Winter	Free	
	MF	(Brazil)	Fran	22	Non-EU	Nacional-SP	Released	Winter	Free	
	MF	(Brazil)	Bruno Arrabal	22	Non-EU	Tupi	Loan	Winter	Free	
	MF	(Brazil)	Gabriel Xavier	21	Non-EU	Cruzeiro	Transfer	Winter	Free (Note: Portuguesa retained 20% of the player's rights)	
	MF	(Brazil)	Júnior Alves	20	Non-EU	Inter-SM	Loan	During season	Free	
		(Brazil)	Ailton Silva	48	Non-EU	Free agent	Contract rescinded	During season	Free	
	MF	(Brazil)	Ferdinando	34	Non-EU	Free agent	Released	During season	Free	
	FW	(Brazil)	Edno	31	Non-EU	ABC	Released	During season	Free	
	FW	(Brazil)	Jussa	19	Non-EU	Vasco	Transfer	During season	Free	
	DF	(Brazil)	Valdomiro	35	Non-EU	Free agent	Released	During season	Free	
	GK	(Brazil)	Rafael Santos	26	Non-EU	Guarani	Contract rescinded	During season	Free	
	DF	(Brazil)	Alex Lima	26	Non-EU	Confiança	Contract rescinded	During season	Free	
	DF	(Brazil)	Filipi Souza	27	Non-EU	São Carlos	Contract rescinded	During season	Free	
	DF	(Brazil)	Perema	22	Non-EU	São Francisco-PA	Loan Return	During season	Free	
	DF	(Brazil)	Bruno Bertucci	25	Non-EU	Free agent	Contract rescinded	During season	Free	
	MF	(Uruguay)	Bruno Piñatares	24	Non-EU	Cerro (Uruguay)	Contract rescinded	During season	Free	
	MF	(Brazil)	Betinho	27	Non-EU	Oeste	Contract rescinded	During season	Free	
	MF	(Brazil)	Jean Mota	21	Non-EU	Free agent	Contract rescinded	During season	Free	
	MF	(Bolivia)	Rudy Cardozo	25	Non-EU	Bolívar (Bolivia)	Loan Return	During season	Free	
	MF	(Brazil)	Giovani	21	EU	Free agent	Contract rescinded	During season	Free	
	FW	(Brazil)	Matheus Ortigoza	21	Non-EU	Mogi Mirim	Loan Return	During season	Free	
	FW	(Brazil)	Popó	36	Non-EU	Free agent	Contract ended	During season	Free	
	DF	(Brazil)	Paulo Henrique	22	Non-EU	Portimonense (Portugal)	Contract rescinded	During season	Free	
	MF	(Brazil)	Léo Costa	29	Non-EU	Ponte Preta	Contract rescinded	During season	Free	
	MF	(Brazil)	Bruno Rios	25	Non-EU	Free agent	Contract rescinded	During season	Free	
	DF	(Brazil)	Fabinho Capixaba	31	Non-EU	Free agent	Contract rescinded	During season	Free	
	MF	(Brazil)	Marcelo Rosa	24	Non-EU	Villa Nova	Loan Return	During season	Free	
	FW	(Brazil)	Júnior Alves	21	Non-EU	Free agent	Contract rescinded	During season	Free	
		(Brazil)	Júnior Lopes	41	Non-EU	Free agent	Contract rescinded	During season	Free	
	MF	(Brazil)	Bruno Arrabal	23	Non-EU	Ethnikos Achna (Cyprus)	Contract rescinded	During season	Free	
	GK	(Brazil)	Lucas Tavares	22	Non-EU	Corinthians USA	Loan	During season	Free	
	GK	(Brazil)	Felipe	27	Non-EU	Free agent	Contract rescinded	During season	Free	
	DF	(Brazil)	Bolívar	34	Non-EU	Free agent	Contract rescinded	During season	Free	
	MF	(Brazil)	Levi	25	Non-EU	Sampaio Corrêa	Contract rescinded	During season	Free (Note: Portuguesa retained 50% of the player's rights)	
	MF	(Brazil)	Francisco Alex	31	Non-EU	Taboão da Serra	Contract rescinded	During season	Free	
	FW	(Brazil)	Michel	35	Non-EU	Free agent	Contract rescinded	During season	Free	
	MF	(Brazil)	Renan Souza	20	Non-EU	Atlético Paranaense	Transfer	During season	Free	
	FW	(Brazil)	Marcelinho	21	Non-EU	Figueirense	Loan	During season	Free	
	DF	(Brazil)	Gustavo Cascardo	18	Non-EU	Atlético Paranaense	Transfer	During season	Free	
	MF	(Brazil)	Cleiton	23	Non-EU	Caldense	Contract rescinded	During season	Free	

Total gaining: ▲ R$ 0.00

Balance

R$ 0.00

== Competitions ==
=== Pre-season/Friendlies ===
17 January	Portuguesa	0 – 1	Atibaia	São Paulo
10:00		Report	30' Adauto	Stadium: CT Parque Ecológico

23 January	Portuguesa	3 – 0	São José	São Paulo
10:00	Léo Costa; Filipi Souza	Report		Stadium: CT Parque Ecológico

24 January	Grêmio Osasco	3 – 2	Portuguesa	Osasco
10:00	Mateus	Report	Popó; Bruno Bertucci	Stadium: CT da Vila Yolanda

2 February	Portuguesa	2 – 2	Grêmio Osasco	São Paulo
	Marcelinho; Giovani	Report	Goal	Stadium: CT Parque Ecológico

23 February	Palmeiras	3 – 1	Portuguesa	São Paulo
	Leandro Pereira	Report	Luan Peres	Stadium: Academia de Futebol

9 May	Portuguesa	1 – 0	Nacional-SP	São Paulo
	Diego	Report		Stadium: Canindé

13 May	Portuguesa	0 – 2	Bragantino	São Paulo
		Report	Chico; Jobinho	Stadium: Canindé

19 May	Palmeiras	2 – 1	Portuguesa	São Paulo
	Amaral; Maikon Leite	Report	(pen.)Guilherme Queiróz	Stadium: Academia de Futebol

25 May	Portuguesa	0 – 1	Bragantino	São Paulo
		Report	77' Johnathan	Stadium: Canindé

=== Campeonato Paulista ===
Pos	Team	Pld	W	D	L	GF	GA	GD	Pts	Qualification
1	Palmeiras (A)	15	10	1	4	23	10	+13	31	Advance to the quarter-finals
2	Botafogo (A)	15	6	4	5	16	14	+2	22	Advance to the quarter-finals
3	Linense	15	4	4	7	12	25	−13	16	
4	Portuguesa	15	2	7	6	13	22	−9	13	
5	Marília	15	0	2	13	6	35	−29	2	

(A) Advance to a further round

==== Matches ====
1 February 1	Ponte Preta	2 – 3	Portuguesa	Campinas
19:30	Renato Chaves (yellow card) 43'; Biro-Biro 48' 69'; Rildo (yellow card) 79'	Report	3' Diego; (yellow card) 54' Popó; 71' Alex Lima; (yellow card) 88' Ferdinando; 90+2' Valdomiro	Stadium: Moisés Lucarelli; Attendance: 5,807; Referee: Adriano de Assis Miranda

4 February 2	Portuguesa	2 – 2	São Bento	Bragança Paulista
17:00	Wanderson 4' (o.g.); Diego 71'; Betinho (yellow card) 78'	Report	(yellow card) 33' Wanderson; 55' Éder Prudêncio; (yellow card) 58' Renan Mota; 79' (pen.) Marcelo Cordeiro	Stadium: Nabi Abi Chedid; Attendance: 239; Referee: Flávio Rodrigues de Souza

8 February 3	Grêmio Osasco	1 – 1	Portuguesa	Osasco
19:30	Rafael Longuine 23'; Didi (yellow card) 33'; Camacho (red card) 79'; Rafinha (yellow card) 90+2'	Report	17' (yellow card) 33' Diego; (yellow card) 24' (red card) 36' Popó; (red card) 79' Ferdinando; (yellow card) 81' Valdomiro	Stadium: José Liberatti; Attendance: 3,889; Referee: Guilherme Ceretta de Lima

18 February 5	Portuguesa	0 – 0	Rio Claro	Barueri
19:30	Valdomiro (yellow card) 56'	Report	(yellow card) 90+2' Nando Carandina	Stadium: Arena Barueri; Attendance: 272; Referee: Norberto Luciano Santos da Silveira

22 February 6	Portuguesa	1 – 3	Santos	São Paulo
16:00	Fabinho Capixaba (yellow card) 8'; Alex Lima (yellow card) 32' (red card) 57'; Jean Mota 90'	Report	18' 34' (pen.) Robinho; (yellow card) 21' (goal) 45' Cicinho	Stadium: Canindé; Attendance: 12,814; Referee: Marcelo Aparecido Ribeiro

28 February 7	Bragantino	1 – 2	Portuguesa	Bragança Paulista
18:30	Anderson Uchoa (yellow card) 19'; Renato Santos (yellow card) 41'; Erick 44'	Report	(yellow card) 44' (goal) 52' Guilherme Almeida; 90' Filipi Souza; (yellow card) 90+3' Jean Mota	Stadium: Nabi Abi Chedid; Attendance: 6,790; Referee: Aurélio Santana

7 March 8	Portuguesa	1 – 1	Penapolense	Barueri
21:00	Léo Costa 13'; Valdomiro (yellow card) 20'; Paulo Henrique (yellow card) 36'; Cardozo (yellow card) 90+1'	Report	(yellow card) 16' Bruno Oliveira; (yellow card) 20' Luiz Gustavo; 47' Léo Melo	Stadium: Arena Barueri; Attendance: 352; Referee: Marcelo Rogério

10 March 9	XV de Piracicaba	2 – 1	Portuguesa	Piracicaba
19:30	Diego Silva (yellow card) 35'; Roni 44'; Paulinho Guerreiro 50' (pen.); Roberto (yellow card) 90+4'	Report	(yellow card) 33' (red card) 80' Filipi Souza; (yellow card) 47' Rafael Santos; 67' Matheus Ortigoza; (yellow card) 81' Betinho	Stadium: Barão da Serra Negra; Attendance: 5,181; Referee: Flávio Rodrigues de Souza

14 March 10	Portuguesa	1 – 2	Capivariano	Barueri
21:00	Betinho (yellow card) 23'; Matheus Ortigoza 31'	Report	19' (yellow card) 61' Vinícius; (yellow card) 34' Fernando Lombardi; 90' Rodolfo	Stadium: Arena Barueri; Attendance: 234; Referee: Thiago Luis Scarascati

21 March 11	Mogi Mirim	1 – 1	Portuguesa	Mogi Mirim
16:00	Valdir 61'; Val (yellow card) 63'; André Luis (yellow card) 72'	Report	24' Léo Costa	Stadium: Romildão; Attendance: 652; Referee: Vinícius Gonçalves Dias Araújo

24 March 4	Corinthians	2 – 0	Portuguesa	São Paulo
19:30	Bruno Henrique (yellow card) 13'; Malcom 28' 64'	Report	(yellow card) 52' Léo Costa; (yellow card) 56' Matheus Ortigoza	Stadium: Arena Corinthians; Attendance: 25,050; Referee: Luiz Flávio de Oliveira

28 March 13	Ituano	0 – 0	Portuguesa	Itu
16:00	Jonatan Lima (red card) 90+2'; Ronaldo (yellow card) 90+4'; Dick (yellow card) 90+5'	Report	(yellow card) 59' Bruno Bertucci	Stadium: Novelli Júnior; Attendance: 2,707; Referee: Marcelo Aparecido Ribeiro de Souza

31 March 12	Portuguesa	0 – 0	São Bernardo	Bragança Paulista
19:30	Popó (yellow card) 90+2'	Report		Stadium: Nabi Abi Chedid; Attendance: 213; Referee: Philippe Lombard

4 April 14	Portuguesa	0 – 2	Red Bull Brasil	Bragança Paulista
16:00	Filipi Souza (yellow card) 35'; Matheus Ortigoza (yellow card) 59'; Guilherme Augusto (yellow card) 68'; Betinho (yellow card) 70'; Fabinho Capixaba (red card) 89'	Report	(yellow card) 35' Juninho; 45' 57' Edmilson; (yellow card) 79' Jonas; (yellow card) 79' Carlinhos	Stadium: Nabi Abi Chedid; Attendance: 681; Referee: Norberto Luciano Santos da Silveira

8 April 15	São Paulo	3 – 0	Portuguesa	São Paulo
22:00	Dória 10'; Alexandre Pato 12'; Jonathan Cafu (penalty missed) 57'; Hudson 57'; Bruno (yellow card) 65'	Report	(yellow card) 56' Alex Lima; (yellow card) 66' (red card) 85' Edno	Stadium: Morumbi; Attendance: 5,240; Referee: Alessandro Darcie

=== Copa do Brasil ===
4 March 1st Rd	Santos-AP	1 – 3	Portuguesa	Macapá
19:30	Diney 63'	Report	(yellow card) 29' Piñatares; 38' Diego; 57' 78' Matheus Ortigoza	Stadium: Milton Corrêa; Attendance: 433; Referee: Wasley do Couto Leão

23 April 2nd Rd	Ituano	1 – 1	Portuguesa	Itu
19:30	Naylhor (yellow card) 25'; Walfrido 49'; Cristian (yellow card) 55'; Peri (yellow card) 66'	Report	(yellow card) 18' Valdomiro; (yellow card) 41' (goal) 44' Léo Costa; (yellow card) 67' Guilherme Almeida	Stadium: Novelli Júnior; Attendance: 2,434; Referee: Adriano de Assis Miranda

28 April 2nd Rd	Portuguesa	1 – 2	Ituano	São Paulo
21:50	Cleiton (yellow card) 11'; Tom (yellow card) 20'; Guilherme Almeida (yellow card) 35'; Renan Souza (yellow card) 45+1' (goal) 66'	Report	(yellow card) 15' Dick; (yellow card) 21' Jonatan; 44' (yellow card) 68' Clayson; (yellow card) 51' Cristian; 88' (pen.) Ronaldo	Stadium: Canindé; Attendance: 1,242; Referee: Aurélio Santana Marins

=== Campeonato Brasileiro ===
==== First phase ====
===== League table =====
Pos	Team	Pld	W	D	L	GF	GA	GD	Pts	Qualification or relegation
1	(Paraná (state)) Londrina (A)	18	9	7	2	23	14	+9	34	Qualifies to the Final stage
2	(São Paulo (state)) Portuguesa (A)	18	9	3	6	30	23	+7	30	Qualifies to the Final stage
3	(Minas Gerais) Tupi (A)	18	8	6	4	18	15	+3	30	Qualifies to the Final stage
4	(Rio Grande do Sul) Brasil de Pelotas (A)	18	7	8	3	30	20	+10	29	Qualifies to the Final stage
5	(Rio Grande do Sul) Juventude	18	7	8	3	30	21	+9	29	
6	(São Paulo (state)) Guarani	18	7	8	3	23	17	+6	29	
7	(Minas Gerais) Tombense	18	3	8	7	16	19	−3	17	
8	(São Paulo (state)) Guaratinguetá	18	4	4	10	19	30	−11	16	
9	(Rio de Janeiro (state)) Madureira (R)	18	1	10	7	19	34	−15	13	Relegation to 2016 Campeonato Brasileiro Série D
10	(Rio Grande do Sul) Caxias (R)	18	0	8	10	14	29	−15	8	Relegation to 2016 Campeonato Brasileiro Série D

(A) Advance to a further round; (R) Relegated

===== Matches =====
15 May 1	Londrina	2 – 1	Portuguesa	Londrina
16:00	Jhon Murillo (yellow card) 29'; Germano 62' 88'; Zé Rafael (yellow card) 78'	Report	(yellow card) 40' Renan Souza; 52' Marcelinho; (yellow card) 59' Diego; (yellow card) 66' Renan Teixeira	Stadium: Do Café; Attendance: 0 (closed doors); Referee: Rodrigo D'Alonso Ferreira

22 May 2	Portuguesa	1 – 1	Brasil de Pelotas	São Paulo
19:00	Guilherme Queiróz 4'; Renan Souza (yellow card) 18'; Hugo (yellow card) 42'; Marcelinho (yellow card) 75'; Renan Teixeira (yellow card) 90+2'	Report	(yellow card) 44' Washington; (yellow card) 45' Alex Amado; 61' Xaro	Stadium: Pacaembu; Attendance: 1,712; Referee: Bruno Arleu de Araújo

29 May 3	Madureira	1 – 2	Portuguesa	Rio de Janeiro
16:00	Daniel 73'	Report	40' 64' Guilherme Queiróz; (yellow card) 41' Bolívar; (yellow card) 81' Dieyson; (yellow card) 85' Felipe	Stadium: Conselheiro Galvão; Attendance: 545; Referee: Devarly Lira do Rosário

6 June 4	Guaratinguetá	0 – 3	Portuguesa	Guaratinguetá
20:15	Henrique (yellow card) 30'; Augusto (yellow card) 35'; Felipe (yellow card) 40'; Ruan (yellow card) 61'	Report	(yellow card) 10' Vinicius; 36' (pen.) 67' Hugo; (yellow card) 51' Anderson Luiz; 60' Guilherme Queiróz; (yellow card) 63' Julinho	Stadium: Ninho da Garça; Attendance: 408; Referee: Marcelo Prieto Alfieri

26 June 5	Portuguesa	0 – 1	Tupi	São Paulo
16:00	Hugo (yellow card) 26'; Bolívar (yellow card) 32'; Victor Bolt (yellow card) 81'	Report	(yellow card) 27' (red card) 90' Mailson; (yellow card) 38' Felipe Augusto; (yellow card) 66' Vinicius Kiss; (yellow card) 68' Osmar; (yellow card) 75' Glaysson; 84' Daniel Morais	Stadium: Canindé; Attendance: 1,838; Referee: Wales Martins de Souza

3 July 6	Juventude	3 – 2	Portuguesa	Caxias do Sul
11:00	Vacaria 5' (yellow card) 68'; Zulu (yellow card) 30'; Duda 65'; Wallacer 83'	Report	(yellow card) 2' Bolívar; (yellow card) 18' Milton Júnior; (yellow card) 38' Victor Bolt; 55' (pen.) Hugo; 85' Guilherme Queiróz	Stadium: Alfredo Jaconi; Referee: Sávio Pereira

10 July 7	Portuguesa	1 – 0	Guarani	São Paulo
19:00	Hugo 31'; Renan Teixeira (yellow card) 73' (red card) 74'	Report	(yellow card) 41' Anderson Santos; (yellow card) 73' Fumagalli	Stadium: Canindé; Referee: Leandro Bizzio Marinho

18 July 8	Portuguesa	3 – 0	Caxias	São Paulo
11:00	Levi (yellow card) 23'; Guilherme Queiróz 64'; Jonathan 68'; Anderson Luiz 77'	Report	(yellow card) 29' (red card) 60' Bebeto; (yellow card) 32' David	Stadium: Canindé; Attendance: 1,686; Referee: Rafael Odilio Ramos dos Santos

24 July 9	Tombense	2 – 2	Portuguesa	Muriaé
20:15	Mateus Silva (yellow card) 23'; Magnum (yellow card) 25'; Rafael Pernão 40' 83'; João Paulo (yellow card) 76'	Report	(yellow card) 23' Dieguinho; (yellow card) 58' Victor Bolt; 87' 90+3' Guilherme Queiróz	Stadium: Soares de Azevedo; Referee: Felipe Duarte Varejão

31 July 10	Portuguesa	1 – 1	Londrina	São Paulo
11:00	Dieguinho (yellow card) 47'; Ítalo 60' (o.g.); Luan Peres (yellow card) 62'; Guilherme Queiróz (yellow card) 87'	Report	14' (yellow card) 66' Vitinho; (yellow card) 44' Rafael Gava; (yellow card) 79' Germano; (yellow card) 84' Júlio Guilherme	Stadium: Canindé; Referee: Léo Simão

10 August 11	Brasil de Pelotas	4 – 1	Portuguesa	Pelotas
20:30	Eduardo 18'; Diogo Oliveira (yellow card) 44'; Cezar Washington 45'; Wender (yellow card) 45'; Leandrão 46'; Leandro Camilo 54'; Eduardo Martini (yellow card) 83'	Report	(yellow card) 37' Victor Bolt; (yellow card) 42' Luan Peres; 50' Guilherme Queiróz; (yellow card) 76' Julinho	Stadium: Bento Freitas; Attendance: 3,270; Referee: Paulo Henrique de Melo Salmazio

17 August 12	Portuguesa	4 – 2	Madureira	São Paulo
20:30	Hugo 56'; Magno 69' (o.g.); Igor (yellow card) 77'; Milton Júnior 79'; Guilherme Queiróz 82'	Report	(yellow card) 7' Luis Felipe; 14' João Carlos; (yellow card) 30' Bruno; (yellow card) 72' (goal) 73' Leandro Chaves	Stadium: Canindé; Attendance: 1,302; Referee: Antonio Dib Moraes de Sousa

23 August 13	Portuguesa	2 – 1	Guaratinguetá	São Paulo
11:00	Hugo 31' (yellow card) 90+4'; Victor Bolt (yellow card) 43'; Milton Júnior (yellow card) 57'; Dieguinho 66'; Guilherme Queiróz (yellow card) 78'; Cascardo (yellow card) 88' (red card) 90+4'	Report	(yellow card) 53' Renan Luis; (yellow card) 62' André; 76' Juninho; (yellow card) 71' Rafael Zuchi	Stadium: Canindé; Attendance: 2,599; Referee: Flávio Rodrigues de Souza

29 August 14	Tupi	1 – 0	Portuguesa	Juiz de Fora
19:00	Rafael Jataí (red card) 22'; Bruno Aquino 45'; Genalvo (yellow card) 77'; Glaysson (yellow card) 89'	Report	(red card) 22' Victor Bolt; (yellow card) 48' Luan Peres; (yellow card) 90' Tom	Stadium: Mário Helênio; Attendance: 1,263; Referee: Thiago de Alencar Gonzaga

7 September 15	Portuguesa	4 – 2	Juventude	São Paulo
20:30	Guilherme Queiróz 6'; Renan Teixeira 53' (yellow card) 54'; Milton Júnior (yellow card) 54'; Dieguinho (yellow card) 79'; Hugo 84'; Willen 90'	Report	(yellow card) 29' Jô; 33' Zulu; (yellow card) 68' Lucas Santos; (yellow card) 71' Pereira; 75' Kelvy; (yellow card) 80' Paulo Baier	Stadium: Canindé; Attendance: 1,344; Referee: Johnn Herbert Alves Bispo

14 September 16	Guarani	1 – 0	Portuguesa	Campinas
20:30	Gladstone (yellow card) 27'; Allan Dias 34'; João (yellow card) 41'; Watson (yellow card) 51'	Report	(yellow card) 32' Hugo; (yellow card) 49' Anderson Luiz; (yellow card) 80' Guilherme Almeida	Stadium: Brinco de Ouro; Attendance: 4,509; Referee: Vinicius Gonçalves Dias Araújo

20 September 17	Caxias	1 – 2	Portuguesa	Caxias do Sul
11:00	Luan Peres 34' (o.g.); Leonardo (yellow card) 83'	Report	26' Paulinho; 65' Guilherme Queiróz	Stadium: Centenário; Referee: Marcos André Gomes da Penha

27 September 18	Portuguesa	1 – 0	Tombense	São Paulo
16:00	Milton Júnior (yellow card) 53'; Julinho 77'	Report	(yellow card) 36' Coutinho; (yellow card) 64' Joílson; (yellow card) 88' Luan	Stadium: Canindé; Attendance: 4,886; Referee: Rodrigo Alonso Ferreira

==== Quarter-finals ====
7 October	Vila Nova	1 – 0	Portuguesa	Goiânia
20:30	Bruno Lopes (yellow card) 40'; Robston (yellow card) 64'; Ramires 70'; Marinho Donizete (yellow card) 75'	Report	(yellow card) 13' Luan Peres; (yellow card) 24' Victor Bolt	Stadium: Serra Dourada; Attendance: 34,189; Referee: Ricardo Marques Ribeiro

17 October	Portuguesa	1–2 (1–3 agg.)	Vila Nova	São Paulo
19:00	Milton Júnior (yellow card) 31'; Paulinho 43'; Hugo (red card) 45'	Report	11' 15' (red card) 45' Frontini; (yellow card) 12' Vitor	Stadium: Canindé; Referee: Péricles Bassols Pegado Cortez
