= Rafael Santos (footballer, born 1989) =

Brazilian footballer

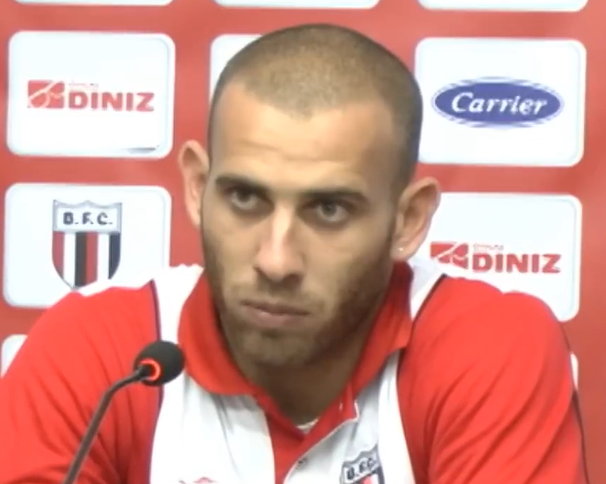
- Rafael Santos in 2013

Personal information
- Full name: Rafael de Carvalho Santos
- Date of birth: 14 March 1989 (age 37)
- Place of birth: Barretos, Brazil
- Height: 1.91 m (6 ft 3 in)
- Position: Goalkeeper

Team information
- Current team: Chapecoense (on loan from Portuguesa)
- Number: 1

Youth career
- 2004–2008: Corinthians

Senior career*
Years	Team	Apps	(Gls)
2008–2013	Corinthians	8	(0)
2011	→ Avaí (loan)	1	(0)
2012	→ Bragantino (loan)	27	(0)
2013	→ Botafogo-SP (loan)	20	(0)
2013–2014	São Caetano	42	(0)
2014	Icasa	0	(0)
2014–2015	Portuguesa	42	(0)
2015	Guarani	13	(0)
2016–2017	Madureira	27	(0)
2016	→ Tupi (loan)	31	(0)
2017–2018	Bahia	2	(0)
2018–2019	Vila Nova	62	(0)
2020–2021	Confiança	88	(0)
2022	Tombense	14	(0)
2023–2024	Operário Ferroviário	79	(0)
2025–	Portuguesa	12	(0)
2025–	→ Chapecoense (loan)	22	(0)
- * Club domestic league appearances and goals as of 9 April 2026

Rafael de Carvalho Santos (born 14 March 1989), known as Rafael Santos, is a Brazilian footballer who plays as a goalkeeper for Chapecoense, on loan from Portuguesa.

== Career ==
Born in Barretos, Rafael Santos joined Corinthians' youth setup in 2004, aged 15. In 2008, he was promoted to the main squad in the Série B, and made his debut on 29 November of that year, starting in a 0–2 loss at América de Natal, as Timão were already champions and both Felipe and Júlio César (first and second choices, respectively) were already on vacation.

In June 2011, after being sparingly used by Corinthians, Rafael Santos moved to fellow Série A side Avaí on loan until the end of the year. However, his maiden appearance for the Leão da Ilha was on 7 September, in a 1–2 home loss against Santos.

Rafael Santos joined Bragantino on 5 January 2012, also on loan. Ahead of the 2013 season, he moved to Botafogo-SP also in a temporary deal.

On 10 May 2013, Rafael Santos was presented at São Caetano. He was a starter during his debut campaign, which ended in relegation.

On 27 June 2014, Rafael Santos moved to Icasa also in the second division, but signed a short-term deal with fellow league side Portuguesa ten days later. He immediately became a first-choice ahead of Glédson and Tom, again suffering relegation.

On 6 May 2015, after being released by Lusa, Rafael Santos signed for Guarani. He began the 2016 campaign at Madureira, but was loaned to Tupi on 22 April of that year.

Back to Madura for the 2017 Campeonato Carioca, Rafael Santos moved to Bahia in the top tier on 12 May 2017, but was only a backup option. He signed for Vila Nova on 9 April 2018, being mainly a second-choice to Mateus Pasinato in his first year before establishing himself as a starter afterwards.

On 19 December 2019, Rafael Santos joined Confiança for the upcoming season. He left on 20 December 2021, after being an undisputed starter, and then moved to Tombense.

Rafael Santos started the 2022 season ahead of Felipe Garcia, but subsequently became a second-choice and joined Operário Ferroviário on 9 November of that year. On 2 September 2023, he renewed his contract with the club for a further year.

On 2 December 2024, Operário announced Rafael Santos' departure from the club, and he returned to Portuguesa ten days later. On 8 April 2025, he was loaned to Chapecoense.

== Career statistics ==
As of 2 March 2025

Club	Season	League			State League		Cup		Continental		Other		Total	
Club	Season	Division	Apps	Goals	Apps	Goals	Apps	Goals	Apps	Goals	Apps	Goals	Apps	Goals
Corinthians	2008	Série B	1	0	—		—		—		—		1	0
Corinthians	2009	Série A	0	0	3	0	0	0	—		—		3	0
Corinthians	2010	Série A	0	0	3	0	—		1 (Note: Appearance(s) in Copa Libertadores)	0	—		4	0
Corinthians	2011	Série A	0	0	1	0	—		0	0	—		1	0
Corinthians	Subtotal		1	0	7	0	0	0	1	0	—		9	0
Avaí (loan)	2011	Série A	1	0	—		—		—		—		1	0
Bragantino (loan)	2012	Série B	6	0	21	0	—		—		—		27	0
Botafogo-SP (loan)	2013	Série D	0	0	20	0	—		—		—		20	0
São Caetano	2013	Série B	35	0	—		—		—		1 (Note: Appearance(s) in Copa Paulista)	0	36	0
São Caetano	2014	Série C	2	0	5	0	—		—		—		7	0
São Caetano	Subtotal		37	0	5	0	—		—		1	0	43	0
Portuguesa	2014	Série B	27	0	—		—		—		—		27	0
Portuguesa	2015	Série C	0	0	15	0	1	0	—		—		16	0
Portuguesa	Subtotal		27	0	15	0	1	0	—		—		43	0
Guarani	2015	Série C	13	0	—		—		—		—		13	0
Madureira	2016	Série D	0	0	15	0	—		—		—		15	0
Madureira	2017	Carioca	—		12	0	—		—		—		12	0
Madureira	Subtotal		0	0	27	0	—		—		—		27	0
Tupi (loan)	2016	Série B	31	0	—		—		—		—		31	0
Bahia	2017	Série A	0	0	—		—		—		—		0	0
Bahia	2018	Série A	0	0	2	0	0	0	0	0	0	0	2	0
Bahia	Subtotal		0	0	2	0	0	0	0	0	0	0	2	0
Vila Nova	2018	Série B	10	0	—		—		—		—		10	0
Vila Nova	2019	Série B	37	0	15	0	6	0	—		—		58	0
Vila Nova	Subtotal		47	0	15	0	6	0	—		—		68	0
Confiança	2020	Série B	32	0	13	0	—		—		10 (Note: Appearance(s) in Copa do Nordeste)	0	55	0
Confiança	2021	Série B	32	0	11	0	1	0	—		9	0	53	0
Confiança	Subtotal		64	0	24	0	1	0	—		19	0	108	0
Tombense	2022	Série B	2	0	12	0	2	0	—		—		16	0
Operário Ferroviário	2023	Série C	22	0	13	0	1	0	—		—		36	0
Operário Ferroviário	2024	Série B	32	0	12	0	4	0	—		—		48	0
Operário Ferroviário	Subtotal		54	0	25	0	5	0	—		—		84	0
Portuguesa	2025	Série D	0	0	12	0	1	0	—		—		13	0
Chapecoense (loan)	2025	Série B	0	0	—		—		—		—		0	0
Career total			283	0	185	0	16	0	1	0	20	0	505	0

== Honours ==
Corinthians

- Campeonato Brasileiro Série B: 2008
- Campeonato Paulista: 2009

Bahia

- Campeonato Baiano: 2018

Confiança

- Campeonato Sergipano: 2020
