= Júnior Alves =

Júnior Alves may refer to:

- Domivânio Alves de Souza Júnior (born 1994), a Brazilian association football player known as Júnior Alves
- José Teixeira Alves Júnior (born 1990), a Brazilian association football player known as Júnior Alves
