= Matheus Jussa =

Brazilian footballer (born 1996)

Personal information
- Full name: Matheus Isaías dos Santos
- Date of birth: 22 March 1996 (age 30)
- Place of birth: Osasco, Brazil
- Height: 1.83 m (6 ft 0 in)
- Positions: Centre-back; defensive midfielder

Team information
- Current team: Chengdu Rongcheng
- Number: 5

Youth career
- 2011–2015: Portuguesa
- 2015–2016: Vasco da Gama

Senior career*
Years	Team	Apps	(Gls)
2014–2015	Portuguesa	11	(0)
2015–2017	Vasco da Gama	0	(0)
2017	→ Bonsucesso (loan)	8	(2)
2018–2019	São Bernardo	26	(1)
2017	→ Botafogo-SP (loan)	8	(0)
2019–2022	Oeste	23	(0)
2020–2021	→ Internacional (loan)	3	(0)
2021	→ Fortaleza (loan)	28	(0)
2022–2024	Fortaleza	17	(0)
2022	→ Qatar SC (loan)	7	(0)
2023	→ Cruzeiro (loan)	26	(1)
2024–2025	Shanghai Port	56	(3)
2026–	Chengdu Rongcheng	21	(1)
- * Club domestic league appearances and goals as of 8 November 2026

Matheus Isaías dos Santos (born 22 March 1996), known as Matheus Jussa or simply Jussa, is a Brazilian professional footballer who plays as a centre-back and defensive midfielder for Chinese Super League club Chengdu Rongcheng.

== Club career ==
Born in São Paulo, Jussa graduated from Portuguesa's youth categories, playing as an attacking midfielder or even as a forward. On 9 September 2014, he made his professional debut, replacing fellow youth graduate Gabriel Xavier in a 0–1 away loss against Santa Cruz for the Série B championship.

On 22 November 2014, Jussa scored his first goal, netting his side's only in a 1–2 away loss against Ceará. He moved back to the under-20s for the 2015 Copa São Paulo de Futebol Júnior, but later returned to the main squad.

On 26 April 2015, after staying four months unpaid, Jussa moved to Vasco da Gama on a free transfer; Portuguesa managed to retain 20% of his federative rights. Initially assigned back to the under-20s, he also featured with the reserves but never appeared for the main squad; during that period, he was converted into a defensive midfielder.

On 10 January 2017, after being above the maximum age to play for the under-20 side, Jussa moved to Bonsucesso on loan for the 2017 Campeonato Carioca. Roughly one year later, he was announced at São Bernardo after agreeing to a permanent deal.

On 10 April 2018, Jussa was loaned to Série C side Botafogo-SP, where he helped the club achieve promotion to the second division.

After subsequently returning to São Bernardo, Jussa joined Oeste ahead of the 2019 Série B. On 2 July 2020, after featuring regularly, he agreed to a one-year loan deal with Internacional in the top tier.

On 12 February 2024, Jussa joined Chinese Super League club Shanghai Port. On 4 January 2026, Jussa announced his departure after the 2025 season.

On 7 January 2026, Jussa joined Chinese Super League club Chengdu Rongcheng.

== Career statistics ==
As of match played 8 November 2026

Club	Season	League			State League		Cup		Continental		Other		Total	
Club	Season	Division	Apps	Goals	Apps	Goals	Apps	Goals	Apps	Goals	Apps	Goals	Apps	Goals
Portuguesa	2014	Série B	9	1	—		—		—		—		9	1
Portuguesa	2015	Série C	0	0	2	0	1	0	—		—		3	0
Portuguesa	Total		9	1	2	0	1	0	—		—		12	1
Vasco da Gama	2016	Série A	0	0	0	0	0	0	—		—		0	0
Bonsucesso (loan)	2017	Carioca	—		8	2	—		—		—		8	2
São Bernardo	2018	Paulista A2	—		15	1	—		—		6 (Note: Appearance(s) in Copa Paulista)	0	21	1
São Bernardo	2019	Paulista A2	—		5	0	—		—		—		5	0
São Bernardo	Total		—		20	1	—		—		6	0	26	1
Botafogo-SP (loan)	2018	Série C	8	0	—		—		—		—		8	0
Oeste	2019	Série B	17	0	—		—		—		—		17	0
Oeste	2020	Série B	0	0	6	0	1	0	—		—		7	0
Oeste	Total		17	0	6	0	1	0	—		—		24	0
Internacional (loan)	2020	Série A	2	0	1	0	—		2 (Note: Appearance(s) in Copa Libertadores)	0	—		5	0
Fortaleza (loan)	2021	Série A	24	0	4	0	10	0	—		7 (Note: Appearance(s) in Copa do Nordeste)	1	45	1
Fortaleza	2022	Série A	12	0	5	0	2	0	5	0	11	0	35	0
Fortaleza	Total		17	0	6	0	1	0	—		—		24	0
Qatar SC (loan)	2022–23	Qatar Stars League	7	0	—		—		—		4 (Note: Appearance(s) in Qatari Stars Cup)	3	11	3
Cruzeiro (loan)	2023	Série A	24	1	2	0	1	0	—		—		27	1
Shanghai Port	2024	Chinese Super League	28	2	—		4	0	3 (Note: Appearance(s) in AFC Champions League Elite)	0	1 (Note: Appearance(s) in Chinese Super Cup)	0	36	2
Shanghai Port	2025	Chinese Super League	28	1	—		2	1	9	0	1	0	40	2
Shanghai Port	Total		56	3	—		6	1	12	0	2	0	76	4
Chengdu Rongcheng	2026	Chinese Super League	21	1	—		1	0	—		—		22	1
Career total			180	6	48	3	22	1	19	0	30	4	299	14

== Honours ==
Fortaleza

- Campeonato Cearense: 2021, 2022
- Copa do Nordeste: 2022

Shanghai Port

- Chinese Super League: 2024, 2025
- Chinese FA Cup: 2024
