= Hugo Almeida (Brazilian footballer) =

Brazilian footballer (born 1986)

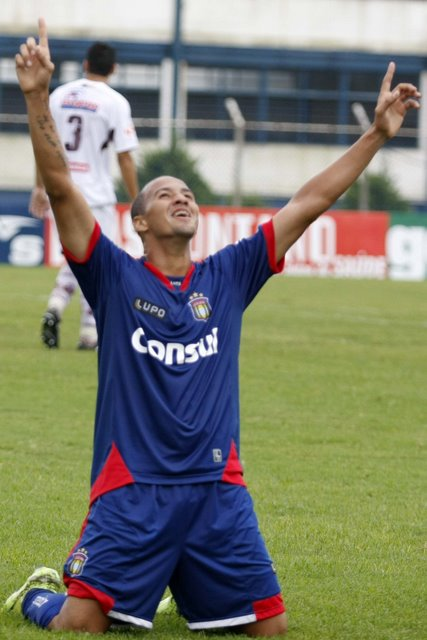

Personal information
- Full name: Hugo Guimarães Silva Santos Almeida
- Date of birth: 6 January 1986 (age 40)
- Place of birth: São Fidélis, Brazil
- Height: 1.83 m (6 ft 0 in)
- Position: Forward

Team information
- Current team: Barra

Youth career
- Botafogo

Senior career*
Years	Team	Apps	(Gls)
2004–2005	Botafogo		
2006–2011	Coritiba	28	(7)
2008	→ Sertãozinho (loan)		
2009–2010	→ São Caetano (loan)	14	(3)
2010	→ Grêmio Prudente (loan)	5	(0)
2011	→ Goiás (loan)	8	(1)
2012	XV de Piracicaba	10	(1)
2012	Paraná	3	(0)
2013	Ventforet Kofu	15	(5)
2013	Roasso Kumamoto	10	(0)
2014	Náutico	1	(1)
2014	Fagiano Okayama	8	(0)
2015–2016	Portuguesa	21	(7)
2016	KF Tirana	3	(1)
2016	Itumbiara	4	(0)
2016	Juventude	21	(8)
2017	América Mineiro	10	(1)
2018	IR Tanger	13	(1)
2018	Paysandu	18	(4)
2019	Joinville	2	(0)
2019	São Bento	1	(0)
2020	Pelotas	5	(2)
2020	Joseense	0	(0)
2020–2021	São Luiz	20	(6)
2021	Gama	10	(2)
2022	Ypiranga Erechim	27	(8)
2022	Itabirito	3	(0)
2023–	Barra	6	(0)

International career
2003	Brazil U17		
- * Club domestic league appearances and goals as of 20:57, 12 February 2023 (UTC)

Hugo Guimarães Silva Santos Almeida (born 6 January 1986), sometimes known as just Hugo, is a Brazilian footballer who plays as a forward for Barra.

== Career ==
Born in São Fidélis, Rio de Janeiro, Hugo Almeida was a Botafogo youth graduate, making his first team debuts in 2004. He left the club in 2005, aged only 19, and joined fellow league team Coritiba in 2006.

Hugo Almeida eventually fell down in the pecking order at Coxa, and was subsequently loaned to Sertãozinho, São Caetano, Grêmio Prudente and Goiás. He was released by Coritiba after the end of the spell with the latter.

On 19 January 2012 Hugo Almeida joined XV de Piracicaba. On 3 May, he moved to Paraná, but appeared rarely.

Hugo Almeida subsequently appeared for clubs in Japan in the following year, representing Ventforet Kofu, Roasso Kumamoto and Fagiano Okayama (after a short spell back to his homeland at Náutico). On 5 January 2015 he signed for Portuguesa.

== Club statistics ==
As of 18 October 2015

Club	Season	State League		National League		National Cup		Continental		Other		Total	
Club	Season	Apps	Goals	Apps	Goals	Apps	Goals	Apps	Goals	Apps	Goals	Apps	Goals
São Caetano	2009	—		6	3	—		—		—		6	3
São Caetano	2010	17	8	8	1	—		—		—		25	9
São Caetano	Subtotal	17	8	14	3	—		—		—		5	0
Grêmio Prudente	2010	—		5	0	—		—		—		5	0
Goiás	2011	14	7	8	1	3	1	—		—		25	9
XV de Piracicaba	2012	10	1	—		—		—		—		10	1
Paraná	2012	—		3	0	1	0	—		—		4	0
Ventforet Kofu	2013	—		15	5	3	1	—		—		18	6
Roasso Kumamoto	2013	—		10	0	—		—		—		10	0
Náutico	2014	8	3	1	1	2	0	—		4	1	15	5
Fagiano Okayama	2014	—		8	0	—		—		—		8	0
Portuguesa	2015	0	0	19	7	2	0	—		—		21	7
Total		49	19	85	17	11	2	—		4	1	121	28

== Honours ==
Brazil

- FIFA U-17 World Cup: 2003

Coritiba

- Campeonato Brasileiro Série B: 2007
- Campeonato Paranaense: 2008

América Mineiro

- Campeonato Brasileiro Série B: 2017

Ittihad Tanger

- Botola: 2017–18
