= Filipi Sousa =

Brazilian footballer (born 1987)

Personal information
- Full name: Filipi de Sousa Barros
- Date of birth: 27 July 1987 (age 39)
- Place of birth: Campinas, Brazil
- Height: 1.74 m (5 ft 9 in)
- Position: Right back

Youth career
- 2005–2007: Santos

Senior career*
Years	Team	Apps	(Gls)
2008–2010	Santos	7	(0)
2009	→ Oeste (loan)	4	(0)
2009	→ Uberaba (loan)		
2010	→ Grêmio Osasco (loan)	6	(0)
2010	→ SEV Hortolândia (loan)		
2011	Sport Barueri	12	(2)
2012	Marcílio Dias	2	(0)
2013	Resende	14	(1)
2013–2014	Glyfada	9	(0)
2014	Cabofriense	8	(0)
2015	Portuguesa	13	(1)
2015–2017	São Carlos	0	(0)
2016	→ ABC (loan)	32	(0)
2018	Toledo	8	(3)
2019	Resende	17	(0)
2020	Caldense	23	(3)
2021	Coimbra	10	(0)
2022	Caldense	18	(0)
2023	Democrata-SL	10	(0)
Total		193	(10)
- * Club domestic league appearances and goals

Filipi de Sousa Barros (born 27 July 1987), known as Filipi Sousa or just Filipi, is a Brazilian retired footballer who played as a right back.

== Club career ==
Born in Campinas, São Paulo, Filipi graduated from Santos' youth setup. He made his first team debut on 16 January 2008, starting in a 0–2 away loss against Portuguesa for the Campeonato Paulista championship.

Filipi made his Série A debut on 11 May, starting in a 1–3 away loss against Flamengo. It was his maiden appearance of the campaign, being a third-choice behind Apodi and Fabiano.

Filipi subsequently spent the rest of his Santos career out on loan, representing Oeste, Uberaba, and Grêmio Osasco and SEV Hortolândia before being released in December 2010.

On 19 December 2011, after a year playing for Sport Barueri, Filipi joined Marcílio Dias. After appearing rarely he moved to Resende in January 2013.

Filipi was offered to Vasco da Gama in April, but moved to Greek Football League side Glyfada on 2 September 2013. He appeared sparingly with the side, and subsequently returned to his homeland on 20 January 2014, after agreeing to a short-term deal with Cabofriense.

On 5 January 2015 Filipi signed for Portuguesa, freshly relegated to Série C.
