= Gerson Sodré =

Brazilian footballer and manager (born 1957)

Personal information
- Full name: Gerson José Sodré
- Date of birth: 14 July 1957 (age 69)
- Place of birth: Itabuna, Brazil
- Position: Midfielder

Team information
- Current team: Águia de Marabá (assistant)

Senior career*
Years	Team	Apps	(Gls)
1976	Itabuna		
1977–1978	América-RJ		
1979–1980	Itabuna		
1980–1984	Portuguesa		
1985	Guarani		
1986	Ceará		
1987	Ferroviária		
1988–1990	Ceará		
1991	América-SP		
1991	Bandeirante		
1992	CRB		
1992–1993	Grêmio Maringá		
1993	Atlético Sorocaba		
1994	Uberlândia		

Managerial career
- 1994: Uberlândia (player-manager)
- 1999: Alecrim
- 2000: Estrela de Vinhedo
- 2000: Campo Limpo Paulista
- 2006: CRB
- 2010: Sport Barueri (interim)
- 2014: Portuguesa (interim)
- 2015: Portuguesa (interim)
- * Club domestic league appearances and goals

Gerson José Sodré (born 14 July 1957), known as Gerson Sodré, is a Brazilian football coach and former player who played as a midfielder. He is the current assistant manager of Águia de Marabá.

== Playing career ==
Born in Itabuna, Bahia, Sodré represented Itabuna, América-RJ, Portuguesa, Guarani, Ceará, Ferroviária, América-SP, Bandeirante, CRB, Grêmio Maringá, Atlético Sorocaba and Uberlândia, retiring with the latter in 1994.

== Post-playing career ==
Sodré acted as a player-manager with his last club Uberlândia, and was later appointed as a youth coach in another of his former clubs, Portuguesa. In 1999, he was named Alecrim manager, but returned to São Paulo shortly after, taking over União de Mogi's youth setup.

After another managerial jobs in the same state, Sodré worked exclusively as Estevam Soares' assistant, only stepping out of his role to manage CRB in 2006 and Sport Barueri in 2010. In 2012, he returned to Lusa and its youth setup, being appointed assistant of the main squad in the following year.

In 2014 Sodré was in charge of the club during a Série B match as an interim, being subsequently replaced by Marcelo Veiga.

== Honours ==
Ceará

- Campeonato Cearense: 1986, 1988

CRB

- Campeonato Alagoano: 1992

Atlético Sorocaba

- Campeonato Paulista Série Extra: 1993
