= Popó (footballer, born 1978) =

Brazilian footballer

Personal information
- Full name: Adilson Ferreira de Souza
- Date of birth: 1 September 1978 (age 48)
- Place of birth: Andradina, Brazil
- Height: 1.68 m (5 ft 6 in)
- Positions: Forward; attacking midfielder

Youth career
- Penapolense

Senior career*
| Years | Team | Apps | (Gls) |
| 1996 | Mogi Mirim | | |
| 1997 | Montevideo Wanderers | | |
| 1997–1998 | Salgueiros | 6 | (0) |
| 1998–1999 | Club América | | |
| 2000 | Bandeirante | | |
| 2001 | Atlético Sorocaba | | |
| 2002–2005 | ADAP | | |
| 2002–2003 | → Araçatuba (loan) | | |
| 2004 | → Coritiba (loan) | 1 | (0) |
| 2005–2006 | Busan I'Park | 66 | (24) |
| 2007–2009 | Gyeongnam FC | 25 | (8) |
| 2008–2009 | → Kashiwa Reysol (loan) | 54 | (8) |
| 2010–2011 | Vissel Kobe | 61 | (16) |
| 2012 | Urawa Reds | 21 | (3) |
| 2013 | Vissel Kobe | 40 | (16) |
| 2014 | Júbilo Iwata | 29 | (6) |
| 2015 | Portuguesa | 0 | (0) |
- * Club domestic league appearances and goals as of 1 December 2014

Adilson Ferreira de Souza (born 1 September 1978), commonly known as Popó, is a Brazilian retired footballer. Mainly a forward, he also played as an attacking midfielder.

== Club career ==
Born in Andradina, São Paulo, Popó made his senior debuts for clubs in his native state, and moved to Primeira Liga's S.C. Salgueiros after a short stint in Uruguay. He made his debut for the latter on 7 December 1997, in a 2–2 away draw against S.L. Benfica.

After being mostly used as a substitute, Popó opted to rescind with the Portuguese outfit, and moved to Club América. He then returned to his home country in 2000, appearing for lower league clubs.

On 11 May 2004 Popó moved to Coritiba. However, he suffered an injury and only appeared sparingly for the club.

In the 2005 summer Popó moved to Busan I'Park; after being a regular starter for the side, he moved to fellow league team Gyeongnam FC in 2007. He was, however, loaned to Kashiwa Reysol in 2008.

After a two-season spell at Kashiwa, Popó signed permanently for Vissel Kobe. He remained in Japan for the following years, representing Urawa Red Diamonds, Vissel Kobe and Júbilo Iwata.

On 20 January 2015 Popó joined Portuguesa, freshly relegated to Série C.

== Club statistics ==
As of 2 April 2015

| Club | Season | League | | Cup | | League Cup | | Continental | | Other | | Total | |
| Club | Season | Apps | Goals | Apps | Goals | Apps | Goals | Apps | Goals | Apps | Goals | Apps | Goals |
|---|---|---|---|---|---|---|---|---|---|---|---|---|---|
| Salgueiros | 1997–98 | 6 | 0 | — | | — | | — | | — | | 6 | 0 |
| Coritiba | 2004 | 1 | 0 | — | | — | | — | | — | | 1 | 0 |
| Busan I'Park | 2005 | 30 | 4 | — | | — | | ? | 4 | — | | 30 | 8 |
| Busan I'Park | 2006 | 36 | 20 | ? | 1 | — | | — | | — | | 36 | 21 |
| Busan I'Park | Subtotal | 66 | 24 | ? | 1 | — | | ? | 4 | — | | 66 | 29 |
| Gyeongnam FC | 2007 | 25 | 8 | — | | — | | — | | — | | 25 | 8 |
| Kashiwa Reysol | 2008 | 29 | 4 | 4 | 1 | 6 | 3 | — | | — | | 39 | 8 |
| Kashiwa Reysol | 2009 | 25 | 4 | 1 | 0 | 5 | 2 | — | | — | | 31 | 6 |
| Kashiwa Reysol | Subtotal | 54 | 8 | 5 | 1 | 11 | 5 | — | | — | | 70 | 14 |
| Vissel Kobe | 2010 | 29 | 9 | 2 | 0 | 5 | 3 | — | | — | | 36 | 12 |
| Vissel Kobe | 2011 | 32 | 7 | 2 | 2 | 1 | 0 | — | | — | | 35 | 9 |
| Vissel Kobe | Subtotal | 61 | 16 | 4 | 2 | 6 | 3 | — | | — | | 71 | 21 |
| Urawa Reds | 2012 | 21 | 3 | 3 | 0 | — | | — | | — | | 24 | 3 |
| Vissel Kobe | 2013 | 40 | 16 | 0 | 0 | — | | — | | — | | 40 | 16 |
| Júbilo Iwata | 2014 | 29 | 6 | 1 | 0 | — | | — | | — | | 30 | 6 |
| Portuguesa | 2015 | 0 | 0 | 0 | 0 | — | | — | | 9 | 0 | 9 | 0 |
| Total | | 303 | 81 | 13 | 4 | 17 | 8 | ? | 4 | 9 | 0 | 342 | 97 |
