= Diego Souza (footballer, born 1993) =

Brazilian footballer

Personal information
- Full name: Diego de Souza Xavier
- Date of birth: 16 January 1993 (age 33)
- Place of birth: Bariri, Brazil
- Height: 1.83 m (6 ft 0 in)
- Position: Attacking midfielder

Team information
- Current team: Treze

Youth career
- 2008–2009: São Paulo
- 2010–2013: Palmeiras

Senior career*
Years	Team	Apps	(Gls)
2012–	Palmeiras	2	(0)
2013	→ Oeste (loan)	6	(0)
2014	→ União Barbarense (loan)	0	(0)
2015	→ Paulista (loan)	9	(0)
2015	→ Portuguesa (loan)	2	(0)
2016	→ Ferroviária (loan)	0	(0)
2017	→ Juventude (loan)	0	(0)
2018–2019	Noroeste	12	(2)
2020–2021	Comercial	0	(0)
2022–	Treze	1	(1)

International career
2012	Brazil U20		
- * Club domestic league appearances and goals as of 13:32, 26 February 2022 (UTC)

Diego de Souza Xavier (born 16 January 1993), known as Diego Souza, is a Brazilian footballer who plays for Treze as an attacking midfielder.

== Club career ==
Born in Bariri, São Paulo, Diego Souza joined Palmeiras' youth setup in 2010, aged 17, after starting it out at São Paulo.

On 25 November 2012 Diego Souza made his first team – and Série A – debut for the former, coming on as a second-half substitute for Patrick Vieira in a 1–2 home loss against Atlético Goianiense. After appearing in only one further match during the year, he was loaned to Oeste on 25 July 2013.

Diego Souza returned to Verdão on 3 January 2014, but was subsequently loaned to União Barbarense, Paulista, Portuguesa, Ferroviária and Juventude.

In December 2018, after a period out of the game due to a cruciate ligament injury, he signed for Noroeste. He moved to Comercial for the 2020 Copa Paulista, but again suffered a knee injury and missed the first half of the 2021 season.

In January 2022 he signed for Treze.
