= Júnior Lopes =

Brazilian football manager (born 1973)

Personal information
- Full name: Antônio Lopes dos Santos Júnior
- Date of birth: 22 November 1973 (age 52)
- Place of birth: Rio de Janeiro, Brazil

Managerial career
- Years: Team
- 2002: Bangu
- 2002–2003: Vasco da Gama (assistant)
- 2004: Olaria
- 2005: Coritiba (interim)
- 2008: Iraty
- 2008: CSA
- 2013: Duque de Caxias
- 2014: Audax Rio
- 2014: Macaé
- 2014–2015: Tombense
- 2015: Portuguesa
- 2016: Tupi
- 2017: Cabofriense
- 2017: Sport (assistant)
- 2018–2019: Cruzeiro (assistant)
- 2020: Vasco da Gama (assistant)
- 2021: Itumbiara
- 2022–2023: Audax Rio
- 2023: Camboriú
- 2024: Ipatinga

Antônio Lopes dos Santos Júnior (born 22 November 1973), known as Júnior Lopes, is a Brazilian football coach.

== Career ==
Born in Rio de Janeiro, Lopes began his career with Botafogo, being an assistant of the club's youth setup, in 1996. In 1998, he moved to cross-town rivals Vasco da Gama, under the same role.

In 2000 Lopes and his father joined the Brazil national team, with him being appointed assistant of the under-17s. He had his first managerial position with Bangu in 2002, after previously being the club's assistant and youth coach.

After another spell at Vasco, Lopes was appointed Olaria manager in 2004. Only months later he moved to Coritiba, becoming his father's assistant. After the latter's dismissal he was named interim manager, but was sacked on 27 October 2005.

After another spells as an assistant at Fluminense, Goiás, Asteras Tripolis and Atlético Paranaense, Lopes was named Iraty manager in 2008. On 31 May 2008, however, he was appointed at the helm of CSA.

After another assistant roles at Palmeiras, Atlético Paranaense and Avaí, Lopes was appointed as Vanderlei Luxemburgo's second at Flamengo. On 28 January 2013, after a spell at Grêmio, he was named Duque de Caxias manager.

Lopes resigned on 22 February, after altercations with the board, and joined Luxemburgo's staff at Fluminense. On 12 February 2014, he was appointed manager of Audax Rio. After failing to avoid relegation he left the club, and was named at the helm of Macaé on 6 April.

On 25 November 2014, Lopes was appointed at Tombense. After taking the club to the semifinals of Campeonato Mineiro, he was named the new manager of Portuguesa on 21 April 2015.

== Personal life ==
Lopes' father, Antônio Lopes, is also a football manager.
