= Anderson Cavalo =

Brazilian footballer (born 1986)

Personal information
- Full name: Anderson Aparecido dos Santos
- Date of birth: 3 July 1986 (age 40)
- Place of birth: São Paulo, Brazil
- Height: 1.88 m (6 ft 2 in)
- Position: Forward

Senior career*
Years	Team	Apps	(Gls)
2006–2007	Guarani	14	(1)
2008	Bandeirante		
2008	Portuguesa Santista		
2009	Uberaba		
2009	Bandeirante	16	(9)
2009	Olé Brasil		
2010	Votoraty	21	(6)
2010	Penapolense		
2011	América-RN		
2011	Noroeste		
2011	Marília	6	(1)
2012	Treze		
2012	Botafogo-PB		
2012	Grêmio Barueri	11	(4)
2013	Cruzeiro-RS		
2013	Marília	22	(8)
2014	Novorizontino	17	(5)
2015	Votuporanguense	23	(16)
2015	Guarani	12	(3)
2016	São Bento	24	(3)
2016–2017	Votuporanguense	18	(4)
2017–2018	São Bento	32	(7)
2018	Novorizontino	6	(2)
2018	Vila Nova	5	(0)
2019	Portuguesa	11	(5)
2019	Portuguesa-RJ	5	(2)
2019	Juventus-SC	5	(0)
2020	Sertãozinho	3	(1)
2020	Pouso Alegre	1	(0)
2020	Imperatriz	8	(2)
2020	FC Cascavel	6	(0)
2020	Iporá	2	(1)
2021	Bandeirante	12	(2)
2021	São Bento	16	(2)
2021	Morrinhos	5	(1)
2022	Cianorte	4	(0)
2022	Andraus	6	(2)
2022	Araucária	9	(3)
2023	União Rondonópolis	2	(1)
2023	XV de Piracicaba	17	(3)
2023	São José-SP	7	(0)
2023	Portuguesa-MS	2	(0)
2024	Lemense	7	(1)
2024	Patriotas	4	(0)
- * Club domestic league appearances and goals as of 16 January 2025

Anderson Aparecido dos Santos (born 3 July 1986), better known as Anderson Cavalo, is a Brazilian professional footballer who plays as a forward.

== Career ==
Anderson Cavalo began his professional career at Guarani FC in 2006, a time when the club had just been relegated, coming to compete in the 2007 Campeonato Paulista Série A2. He played 14 matches and scored one goal. In the following years, he continued to play in lower football divisions in São Paulo, for Bandeirante de Birigui and Portuguesa Santista, and in Minas Gerais for Uberaba SC. He also played in 2009 for Olé Brasil, in 2010 for Votoraty and Penapolense, and in 2011 for América de Natal in the Campeonato Potiguar, Noroeste and Marília, still without gaining much prominence. In 2012, he started competing in the Campeonato Paraibano for Treze, but due to his performance he was hired by Botafogo during the competition.

In 2014 Cavalo achieved the first professional title of his career, being part of the Série A3 champion squad with Novorizontino. The following year, he was the competition's top scorer, playing for CA Votuporanguense. His outstanding performance sparked the interest of Guarani FC, his first professional club, at the time competing in the 2015 Campeonato Brasileiro Série B. In this second spell, he played in 12 matches and scored 3 goals in the competition.

In the 2017 and 2018 seasons, he alternated new spells at Votuporanguense and São Bento. In July he was hired by Vila Nova, to compete in the 2018 Campeonato Brasileiro Série B. In the 2019 season, Anderson Cavalo started for Portuguesa de Desportos in Paulista A2, and switched to Portuguesa do Rio de Janeiro, in the Série D dispute in the second half of the year.

In October 2019, he agreed to transfer to Sertãozinho. However, due to disagreements with the coach, he ended his contract at the beginning of March. On the 12th, he agreed with Pouso Alegre FC to compete in Module II, where he became champion. In September, he was announced as a reinforcement for Imperatriz in the 2020 Campeonato Brasileiro Série C. After failing to prevent the club's relegation, he signed a contract with FC Cascavel.

With few performances and without scoring goals, Cavalo signed with Iporá de Goiás. Stayed at the club for just over a month and in February, he signed with Bandeirante EC for a second spell. In the second half of the year, he returned once again to São Bento.

In 2023 he ended his contract with União Rondonópolis after two matches, and on 10 February he signed with XV de Piracicaba. He competed in the Copa Paulista for São José EC, where he finished runner-up. On 20 October 2023, he announced a contract with Lemense FC to compete in the 2024 Série A3.

== Honours ==
Novorizontino

- Campeonato Paulista Série A3: 2014

Pouso Alegre

- Campeonato Mineiro Módulo II: 2020

Portuguesa-MS

- Campeonato Sul-Mato-Grossense Série B: 2023

Individual

- 2015 Campeonato Paulista Série A3 top scorer: 16 goals
