= Milton Júnior =

Brazilian footballer

Personal information
- Full name: Milton Batista Vieira Júnior
- Date of birth: 27 March 1991 (age 35)
- Place of birth: Nova Andradina, Brazil
- Height: 1.85 m (6 ft 1 in)
- Position: Defensive midfielder

Youth career
- Internacional

Senior career*
Years	Team	Apps	(Gls)
2011–2013	Internacional	0	(0)
2012	→ Sport (loan)	2	(0)
2013	ASA	5	(0)
2014–2015	Ferroviária	32	(3)
2015	→ Portuguesa (loan)	11	(1)
2016	Portuguesa	0	(0)
2017	Red Bull Brasil	0	(0)
2019–2020	SC Sagamihara	18	(1)
- * Club domestic league appearances and goals as of 18 October 2015

Milton Batista Vieira Júnior (born 27 March 1991), known as Milton Júnior, is a Brazilian footballer who plays for Grêmio Novorizontino as a defensive midfielder.

== Club career ==
Born in Nova Andradina, Mato Grosso do Sul, Milton Júnior graduated with Internacional's youth setup. He made his senior debuts in 2011, appearing with the side in the year's Campeonato Gaúcho.

On 26 December 2011 Milton Júnior joined Sport in a season-long loan deal. After being a regular starter in Campeonato Pernambucano, he made his Série A debut on 6 June 2012, coming on as a second-half substitute in a 2–1 home win against Palmeiras.

On 21 March 2013 Milton Júnior rescinded with Inter and signed for ASA until the end of the year. On 26 December, after appearing sparingly, he moved to Ferroviária.

On 1 June 2015 Milton Júnior was loaned to Portuguesa, until December. On 18 January of the following year, after rescinding his contract with Ferroviária, he returned to Lusa in a permanent deal.
