= Betinho (footballer, born December 1987) =

Brazilian footballer

Personal information
- Full name: João Roberto Custódio
- Date of birth: 31 December 1987 (age 38)
- Place of birth: São Paulo, Brazil
- Height: 1.77 m (5 ft 9 1/2 in)
- Position: Defensive midfielder

Youth career
- Grêmio Mauaense

Senior career*
Years	Team	Apps	(Gls)
2008	Grêmio Mauaense	18	(2)
2010	Nacional-SP	26	(2)
2011–2012	Noroeste	21	(1)
2013	Grêmio Osasco	13	(0)
2013–2014	Boa Esporte	60	(2)
2015	Portuguesa	14	(0)
2015–2020	Osasco Sporting	194	(2)
2017	→ Osasco Audax (loan)	7	(1)
2021	Taubaté	12	(1)
2021–2022	Sampaio Corrêa	21	(0)
2022	Portuguesa Santista	14	(0)
2022–2025	Juventus	38	(0)
- * Club domestic league appearances and goals as of 25 August 2026

João Roberto Custódio (born 31 December 1987), commonly known as Betinho, is a Brazilian footballer who plays for Juventus as a defensive midfielder.

== Career ==
Born in São Paulo, Betinho made his senior debuts for Engenheiro Beltrão in 2009. In 2011, he moved to Noroeste, and made his professional debut on 20 February 2011, coming on as a second half substitute in a 0–2 away loss against São Bernardo FC for the Campeonato Paulista championship.

In January 2013 Betinho signed for Grêmio Osasco. In May, after appearing regularly, he joined Série B's Boa Esporte; he rescinded with the latter on 29 October 2014.

On 5 January 2015 Betinho signed for Portuguesa, freshly relegated to Série C.

== Career statistics ==
As of match played 2025 season

Appearances and goals by club, season and competition
Club	Season	League			State League		Cup		Continental		Other		Total	
Club	Season	Division	Apps	Goals	Apps	Goals	Apps	Goals	Apps	Goals	Apps	Goals	Apps	Goals
Grêmio Mauaense	2008	Paulista Segunda Divisão	0	0	18	2	0	0	0	0	0	0	18	2
Nacional-SP	2010	Paulista Segunda Divisão	0	0	26	2	0	0	0	0	0	0	26	2
Noroeste	2011	Campeonato Paulista	0	0	1	0	0	0	0	0	18 (Note: Appearances in Copa Paulista)	0	19	0
Noroeste	2012	Série A2	0	0	20	1	0	0	0	0	0	0	20	1
Noroeste	Total		—		21	1	—		—		18	0	39	1
Grêmio Osasco	2012	Série A3	0	0	0	0	0	0	0	0	17	0	17	0
Grêmio Osasco	2013	Série A2	0	0	13	0	0	0	0	0	0	0	13	0
Grêmio Osasco	Total		—		13	0	—		—		17	0	30	0
Boa Esporte	2013	Série B	31	2	0	0	0	0	0	0	0	0	31	2
Boa Esporte	2014	Série B	18	0	11	0	0	0	0	0	0	0	29	0
Boa Esporte	Total		49	2	11	0	—		—		—		60	2
Portuguesa	2015	Campeonato Paulista	0	0	14	0	3	0	0	0	0	0	17	0
Osasco Sporting	2015	Série B	12	0	0	0	0	0	0	0	0	0	12	0
Osasco Sporting	2016	Série B	24	0	13	0	0	0	0	0	0	0	37	0
Osasco Sporting	2017	Série B	30	0	0	0	0	0	0	0	0	0	30	0
Osasco Sporting	2018	Série B	28	1	17 (Note: Appearances in Campeonato Paulista Série A2)	0	2	0	0	0	0	0	47	1
Osasco Sporting	2019	Série B	23	0	15	0	2	0	0	0	0	0	40	0
Osasco Sporting	2020	Série B	20	0	12	1	1	0	0	0	0	0	33	1
Osasco Sporting	Total		137	1	57	1	5	0	—		—		199	2
Osasco Audax (loan)	2017	Campeonato Paulista	0	0	7	1	1	0	0	0	0	0	8	1
Taubaté	2021	Série A2	0	0	12	1	0	0	0	0	0	0	12	1
Sampaio Corrêa	2021	Série B	21	0	0	0	0	0	0	0	0	0	21	0
Portuguesa Santista	2022	Série A2	0	0	14	0	0	0	0	0	0	0	14	0
Juventus-SP	2022	Série A2	0	0	0	0	0	0	0	0	7	0	7	0
Juventus-SP	2023	Série A2	0	0	14	0	0	0	0	0	7	0	21	0
Juventus-SP	2024	Série A2	0	0	14	0	0	0	0	0	0	0	14	0
Juventus-SP	2025	Série A2	0	0	10	0	0	0	0	0	0	0	10	0
Juventus-SP	Total		0	0	38	0	0	0	0	0	14	0	52	0
Career total			207	3	231	8	9	0	0	0	49	0	496	11
