= Peri (footballer) =

Brazilian footballer

Personal information
- Full name: Alessandro Silva de Araújo
- Date of birth: 28 February 1986 (age 40)
- Place of birth: Palmeira dos Índios, Brazil
- Height: 1.76 m (5 ft 9 1/2 in)
- Position: Left back

Team information
- Current team: Santa Cruz
- Number: 6

Senior career*
| Years | Team | Apps | (Gls) |
| 2007–2008 | Igaci | | |
| 2008 | → CSE | | |
| 2009 | Sinop | | |
| 2009 | Santa Rita | | |
| 2009 | Vitória da Conquista | | |
| 2010 | Coruripe | 0 | (0) |
| 2010 | Sergipe | | |
| 2010 | Sport Atalaia | 0 | (0) |
| 2011 | CSE | 0 | (0) |
| 2011 | Juazeirense | | |
| 2011 | Chã Grande | 0 | (0) |
| 2012–2014 | Salgueiro | 40 | (1) |
| 2013 | → Sport Recife (loan) | 12 | (0) |
| 2015–2017 | Ituano | 11 | (0) |
| 2015 | → CRB (loan) | 21 | (1) |
| 2016 | → CRB (loan) | 11 | (0) |
| 2017 | Paysandu | 24 | (0) |
| 2018 | Botafogo-SP | 23 | (0) |
| 2019 | Ituano | 26 | (1) |
| 2019 | XV de Piracicaba | 15 | (0) |
| 2020 | Água Santa | 1 | (0) |
| 2020– | Santa Cruz | 7 | (0) |
- * Club domestic league appearances and goals as of 22:50, 4 February 2020 (UTC)

Alessandro Silva de Araújo (born 28 February 1986), known by his nickname Peri, is a Brazilian footballer who plays for Santa Cruz as a left back

== Career statistics ==
As of 6 February 2017

| Club | Season | League | | | State League | | Cup | | Continental | | Other | | Total | |
| Club | Season | Division | Apps | Goals | Apps | Goals | Apps | Goals | Apps | Goals | Apps | Goals | Apps | Goals |
|---|---|---|---|---|---|---|---|---|---|---|---|---|---|---|
| Coruripe | 2010 | Alagoano | — | | 16 | 2 | — | | — | | — | | 16 | 2 |
| CSE | 2011 | Alagoano | — | | 15 | 0 | — | | — | | — | | 15 | 0 |
| Salgueiro | 2012 | Série C | 18 | 1 | 22 | 2 | — | | — | | — | | 40 | 3 |
| Salgueiro | 2013 | Série D | 4 | 0 | 17 | 0 | 6 | 1 | — | | 6 (Note: All appearance(s) in Copa do Nordeste) | 0 | 33 | 1 |
| Salgueiro | Subtotal | | 22 | 1 | 39 | 2 | 6 | 1 | — | | 6 | 0 | 73 | 4 |
| Sport | 2013 | Série B | 12 | 0 | — | | — | | 3 | 0 | — | | 15 | 0 |
| Salgueiro | 2014 | Série C | 18 | 0 | 7 | 0 | — | | — | | — | | 25 | 0 |
| Ituano | 2015 | Paulista | — | | 12 | 0 | 6 | 0 | — | | — | | 18 | 0 |
| Ituano | 2016 | Série D | 11 | 0 | 14 | 0 | — | | — | | 1 (Note: All appearance(s) in Copa Paulista) | 0 | 26 | 0 |
| Ituano | 2017 | Paulista | — | | 1 | 0 | — | | — | | — | | 1 | 0 |
| Ituano | Subtotal | | 11 | 0 | 27 | 0 | 6 | 0 | — | | 1 | 0 | 45 | 0 |
| CRB | 2015 | Série B | 21 | 1 | — | | — | | — | | — | | 21 | 1 |
| CRB | 2016 | Série D | 11 | 0 | — | | — | | — | | — | | 11 | 0 |
| CRB | Subtotal | | 32 | 1 | — | | — | | — | | — | | 32 | 1 |
| Career total | | | 95 | 2 | 104 | 4 | 12 | 1 | 3 | 0 | 7 | 0 | 221 | 7 |
