= Luan (footballer, born 17 September 1988) =

Brazilian footballer

Personal information
- Full name: Luan de Assis Costa Leite
- Date of birth: 17 September 1988 (age 38)
- Place of birth: Valença, Brazil
- Height: 1.87 m (6 ft 1 1/2 in)
- Position: Centre back

Youth career
- 2005–2006: Joinville
- 2007–2008: Volta Redonda

Senior career*
Years	Team	Apps	(Gls)
2008–2017	Volta Redonda	25	(1)
2009	→ Fênix 2005 (loan)		
2010	→ Goytacaz (loan)		
2011–2012	→ Barra Mansa (loan)		
2015	→ Tombense (loan)	7	(0)
2016	→ Zimbru Chișinău (loan)	17	(0)
2017–2018	Portuguesa-RJ	0	(0)
2018	Botafogo-PB	0	(0)
2020–2021	Volta Redonda	22	(0)
- * Club domestic league appearances and goals

Luan de Assis Costa Leite (born 17 September 1988), known as Luan, is a Brazilian former footballer who played as a defender.
