= Johnathan (footballer, born 1992) =

Brazilian footballer

Personal information
- Full name: Johnathan Pereira da Silva
- Date of birth: 8 January 1992 (age 34)
- Place of birth: Guarulhos, Brazil
- Height: 1.70 m (5 ft 7 in)
- Position: Forward

Youth career
- Portuguesa
- Palmeiras
- Corinthians

Senior career*
Years	Team	Apps	(Gls)
2013	Corinthians	0	(0)
2013	→ Flamengo-SP (loan)	6	(4)
2015	Independente Limeira	19	(10)
2015	Bragantino	5	(1)
2015–2016	Portuguesa	0	(0)
2017	Inter de Limeira	17	(1)
- * Club domestic league appearances and goals as of 20 May 2017

Johnathan Pereira da Silva (born 8 January 1992), simply known as Johnathan, is a Brazilian footballer who plays as a forward.

== Club career ==
Born in Guarulhos, São Paulo, Johnathan graduated with Corinthians' youth setup. In 2013, he made his senior debuts, while on loan at hometown's Flamengo.

After struggling severely with injuries, Johnathan decided to retire from football. In 2015, however, he was convinced to return playing, and joined Independente de Limeira.

On 8 May 2015, Johnathan signed for Bragantino. He made his professional debut on 4 July, coming on as a second-half substitute and scoring his team's only in a 1–2 home loss against Santa Cruz for the Série B championship.

On 15 September 2015 Johnathan moved to Portuguesa, after being rarely used by Braga.
