= Renan Teixeira =

Brazilian footballer

Personal information
- Full name: Renan Teixeira da Silva
- Date of birth: 29 March 1985 (age 41)
- Place of birth: Caieiras, Brazil
- Height: 1.81 m (5 ft 11 in)
- Position: Defensive midfielder

Senior career*
| Years | Team | Apps | (Gls) |
| 2003–2011 | São Paulo | 77 | (1) |
| 2006–2007 | → Juventude (loan) | 29 | (12) |
| 2007 | → Cruzeiro (loan) | 6 | (1) |
| 2007–2008 | → Al Ittihad (loan) | 14 | (6) |
| 2008–2009 | → Vitória (loan) | 31 | (0) |
| 2009 | → Atlético Mineiro (loan) | 28 | (0) |
| 2010 | → Guarani (loan) | 30 | (1) |
| 2011–2012 | Vitória de Guimarães | 20 | (1) |
| 2012 | Atlético Paranaense | 4 | (1) |
| 2012–2013 | Sport | 26 | (1) |
| 2014 | Linense | 0 | (0) |
| 2014 | Académico Viseu | 8 | (0) |
| 2015 | São Bento | 0 | (0) |
| 2015–2016 | Portuguesa | 18 | (1) |
| 2015 | São Bento | 2 | (0) |
| 2016 | Tupi | 22 | (1) |
| 2017–2018 | Joinville | 15 | (1) |
| 2019 | Central | 0 | (0) |
- * Club domestic league appearances and goals as of 15:58, 15 June 2019 (UTC)

Renan Teixeira da Silva, sometimes known as just Renan (born 29 March 1985, in Caieiras), is a Brazilian footballer who plays as a defensive midfielder.

On January 31, 2008 Renan Teixeira was made an Italian citizen in Potenza Picena, Province of Macerata, in the Italian region of Marche, only three days after Paulo César Arruda Parente. The interesting fact to this, is that other footballers like Mauro Camoranesi and Cicinho were also made Italian citizen in Potenza Picena.

== Honours ==
São Paulo

- Campeonato Paulista: 2005
- Copa Libertadores: 2005
- FIFA Club World Cup: 2005
