= Julinho (footballer, born 1987) =

Brazilian footballer

Personal information
- Full name: Júlio César Machado Colares
- Date of birth: 21 July 1987 (age 39)
- Place of birth: Bagé, Brazil
- Height: 1.85 m (6 ft 1 in)
- Position: Left back

Team information
- Current team: Bishkek City
- Number: 6

Youth career
- Juventude

Senior career*
Years	Team	Apps	(Gls)
2007	Guarany Bagé		
2008–2009	Grêmio		
2008–2009	→ Charleroi (loan)		
2010	Inter-SM	11	(0)
2010–2011	Gil Vicente		
2011–2012	14 de Julho		
2012–2013	Ypiranga-RS		
2013	Canoas	10	(1)
2013–2014	Juventude	23	(0)
2013	→ Boa Esporte (loan)		
2015	Capivariano		
2015	América-RN		
2015	Portuguesa	14	(1)
2016	XV de Piracicaba	10	(1)
2016–2017	Cuiabá	17	(0)
2017	Água Santa	20	(0)
2017	Figueirense	10	(0)
2018	Caxias	11	(0)
2018	Sampaio Corrêa	14	(2)
2019	Ferroviária		
2019	Operário-PR	10	(0)
2020	Santo André		
2020–2021	Ituano		
2021	São Bento		
2021	Santa Cruz		
2021	Portuguesa		
2022	Audax-RJ		
2022–2023	Monsoon		
2023	Audax-RJ		
2023–2024	Monsoon		
2024	Inter de Lages		
2024–2025	Resende		
2025–	Bishkek City		
- * Club domestic league appearances and goals

Júlio César Machado Colares (born 21 July 1987), commonly known as Julinho, is a Brazilian professional footballer who plays as a left back for Bishkek City in the Kyrgyz Premier League.

== Career ==
In May 2015, Portuguesa announced the signing of Julinho.

On 9 January 2025, Julinho was announced as one of the first signings for newly formed Kyrgyz Premier League club Bishkek City.

== Honours ==
América-RN

- Campeonato Potiguar: 2015
