= Dick (footballer) =

Brazilian footballer (born 1984)

Personal information
- Full name: Luiz Henrique Almeida de Lima
- Date of birth: 13 February 1984 (age 42)
- Place of birth: Guarujá, Brazil
- Height: 1.87 m (6 ft 1 1/2 in)
- Position: Defender

Team information
- Current team: Portuguesa SP

Senior career*
Years	Team	Apps	(Gls)
2004–2005	Volta Redonda		
2005	Nova Iguaçu		
2006	Bragantino		
2006	Portuguesa Santista		
2007	Sertãozinho		
2007	Joinville		
2008	Coritiba		
2009	Veranópolis	0	(0)
2010	Pelotas	0	(0)
2010	América de Natal	2	(0)
2011–2012	Rio Branco–PR	0	(0)
2012	Marcílio Dias	0	(0)
2013	Cabofriense	0	(0)
2013	Caxias	12	(1)
2014	Ituano	0	(0)
2014	Bragantino	3	(0)
2015	Ituano	0	(0)
2016	Paraná	0	(0)
2017	Sertãozinho	0	(0)
2017	URT	0	(0)
2017	CSA	13	(1)
2018	Joinville	0	(0)
2019–	Portuguesa SP	0	(0)
- * Club domestic league appearances and goals as of 14:25, 29 April 2019 (UTC)

Luiz Henrique Almeida de Lima (born 13 February 1984), known as Dick, is a Brazilian footballer who plays for Portuguesa SP as a defender.

== Career statistics ==
As of 26 January 2017

Club	Season	League			State League		Cup		Continental		Other		Total	
Club	Season	Division	Apps	Goals	Apps	Goals	Apps	Goals	Apps	Goals	Apps	Goals	Apps	Goals
Veranópolis	2009	Gaúcho	—		2	0	—		—		—		2	0
Pelotas	2010	Série D	—		16	1	—		—		—		16	1
América–RN	2010	Série B	2	0	—		—		—		—		2	0
Rio Branco–PR	2012	Paranaense	—		3	1	—		—		—		3	1
Marcílio Dias	2012	Catarinense	—		4	0	—		—		—		4	0
Caxias	2013	Série C	12	1	—		—		—		—		12	1
Ituano	2014	Série D	—		18	0	—		—		—		18	0
Bragantino	2014	Série B	3	0	—		0	0	—		—		3	0
Ituano	2015	Paulista	—		12	0	8	0	—		7 (Note: All appearance(s) in Copa Paulista)	0	27	0
Paraná	2016	Série B	—		10	0	0	0	—		—		10	0
Career total			17	1	65	2	8	0	0	0	7	0	97	3
