= Guilherme Almeida =

Brazilian footballer (born 1993)

Personal information
- Full name: Guilherme Almeida Augusto
- Date of birth: 29 January 1993 (age 33)
- Place of birth: Osasco, Brazil
- Height: 1.85 m (6 ft 1 in)
- Position: Centre back

Team information
- Current team: Águia de Marabá

Youth career
- 2006–2011: Portuguesa
- 2011–2012: Palmeiras
- 2012–2013: São Paulo

Senior career*
| Years | Team | Apps | (Gls) |
| 2013–2014 | Avaí | 0 | (0) |
| 2014 | → Tokyo Verdy (loan) | 0 | (0) |
| 2015–2016 | Portuguesa | 21 | (1) |
| 2017 | CRAC | 4 | (0) |
| 2018 | São Paulo-RS | 0 | (0) |
| 2019– | Águia de Marabá | 17 | (1) |
- * Club domestic league appearances and goals as of 05:31, 5 August 2020 (UTC)

Guilherme Almeida Augusto (born 29 January 1993), known as Guilherme Almeida or simply Guilherme, is a Brazilian footballer who plays for Águia de Marabá as a central defender.

== Club career ==
Born in Osasco, São Paulo, Guilherme represented Portuguesa, São Paulo and Palmeiras as a youth. In 2013, he moved to Avaí, but failed to make a first team appearance for the club.

In March 2014 Guilherme was loaned to Tokyo Verdy until December. He returned to Avaí after contributing with no minutes, and was subsequently released.

On 29 January 2015 Guilherme returned to his first club Portuguesa. He made his debut for the club on 28 February, starting and scoring his team's first in a 2–1 away win against Bragantino for the Campeonato Paulista championship.
