= Marcelinho (footballer, born 1994) =

Brazilian footballer

Personal information
- Full name: Marcelo Henrique França de Siqueira
- Date of birth: 23 May 1994 (age 32)
- Place of birth: Suzano, Brazil
- Height: 1.75 m (5 ft 9 in)
- Position: Forward

Team information
- Current team: Juventus

Youth career
- Portuguesa

Senior career*
Years	Team	Apps	(Gls)
2012–2015	Portuguesa	17	(1)
2015	→ Figueirense (loan)	2	(0)
2016	CRB	0	(0)
2016	Guarani	0	(0)
2016	Juventus	0	(0)
2017–2018	Nacional	0	(0)
2018	→ Novoperário (loan)	3	(0)
2018–2019	Birkirkara	20	(3)
2020–	Juventus	0	(0)
- * Club domestic league appearances and goals as of 00:40, 27 August 2019 (UTC)

Marcelo Henrique França de Siqueira (born 23 May 1994), commonly known as Marcelinho, is a Brazilian professional footballer who plays for Juventus as a forward.

== Club career ==
Born in Suzano, Marcelinho graduated from Portuguesa's youth setup. He made his first-team debut on 11 May 2012, coming on as a late substitute in a 0–2 loss at Bahia, for that year's Copa do Brasil.

On 2 November 2013, Marcelinho made his Série A debut, starting in a 1–2 loss at São Paulo. He scored his first goal as a senior on 17 May 2015, in a 1–2 Série C away loss against Londrina.

On 15 September 2015, Marcelinho was loaned to Figueirense, until the end of the year.
