= Matheus Ortigoza =

Brazilian footballer

Personal information
- Full name: Matheus Cardoso de Souza
- Date of birth: 8 September 1993 (age 33)
- Place of birth: Garopaba, Brazil
- Height: 1.82 m (6 ft 0 in)
- Position: Forward

Team information
- Current team: Mogi Mirim (on loan from Duque de Caxias)

Youth career
- Imbituba
- 2010–2013: Corinthians
- 2013–2014: Avaí

Senior career*
| Years | Team | Apps | (Gls) |
| 2014– | Duque de Caxias | 12 | (3) |
| 2015 | → Portuguesa (loan) | 0 | (0) |
| 2015–2016 | → Mogi Mirim (loan) | 24 | (6) |
- * Club domestic league appearances and goals as of 11 July 2016

Matheus Cardoso de Souza (born 8 September 1993), known as Matheus Ortigoza, is a Brazilian footballer who plays for Mogi Mirim, on loan from Duque de Caxias, as a forward.

== Club career ==
Ortigoza was born in Garopaba, Santa Catarina, and joined Corinthians' youth setup on 27 July 2010, after starting it out at Imbituba. In 2013, he moved to Avaí, being assigned to the under-20 squad. His position on the team is striker-centre-forward.

On 7 May 2014, Ortigoza joined Duque de Caxias, and also scored his first goal for on 3 August, which ended the team's a five-month fasting. He finished the campaign with 12 appearances and three goals.

On 10 February 2015, Ortigoza was loaned to Portuguesa, after a period on trial. He made his debut for the club on 4 March, starting and scoring a brace in a 3–1 Copa do Brasil away win against Santos-AP; six days later he made his Campeonato Paulista debut, coming on as a second half substitute for Diego Gonçalves in a 2–1 away loss against XV de Piracicaba, also scoring his side's only.

On 18 May Ortigoza moved to Mogi Mirim, shortly after being released by Lusa.
