= Anderson Luiz (footballer, born 1982) =

Brazilian footballer

Personal information
- Full name: Anderson Luiz Gomes Ribeiro
- Date of birth: 18 April 1982 (age 44)
- Place of birth: Rio de Janeiro, Brazil
- Height: 1.88 m (6 ft 2 in)
- Position: Centre back

Youth career
- 1999–2000: Flamengo

Senior career*
Years	Team	Apps	(Gls)
2001–2004	Flamengo		
2005	Brasiliense		
2005	Portuguesa		
2006	Madureira		
2006	Duque de Caxias		
2006–2007	Vasco da Gama		
2007	Duque de Caxias		
2008	Juventus-SP		
2008	Bangu		
2009–2010	Votoraty		
2010–2012	Treze		
2012	Luverdense		
2013	Anápolis		
2014	Itapirense		
2015	Boavista		
2015	Portuguesa		
2016–2018	Boavista		
- * Club domestic league appearances and goals as of 01:41, 16 April 2022 (UTC)

Anderson Luiz Gomes Ribeiro (born 18 April 1982), known as Anderson Luiz, is a Brazilian footballer who played as a central defender.

== Club career ==
Born in Rio de Janeiro, Anderson Luiz spent most of his career in lower divisions of Brazil. He was signed by Madureira in December 2005 for 2006 Campeonato Carioca, finished as the runner-up. On 2 April 2006 he was signed by Duque de Caxias for the remain matches of Campeonato Carioca second division. The team finished as the final 8. On 3 July 2006 he was signed by Vasco in 1-year contract, but loaned Anderson back to Duque de Caxias for a promotion playoffs. (eventually no team promoted) In December 2006 he returned to Vasco but only played twice. A friendly match and a 2007 Copa do Brasil match. Anderson then returned to Duque de Caxias and finished fifth in Campeonato Carioca second division and promoted. However, he left for Clube Atlético Juventus and played in 2008 Copa do Brasil and 2008 Campeonato Paulista. In July, he moved back to Rio for Bangu, winning 2008 second division of the state. In January 2009 he was signed by Votoraty, winning 2009 Campeonato Paulista Série A3 and 2009 Copa Paulista de Futebol. The team finished as the ninth of 2010 Campeonato Paulista Série A2. He then joined Treze of 2010 Campeonato Brasileiro Série D in June. The team finished as the losing side of Série D second stage and as losing semi-finalists of 2010 Campeonato do Nordeste. He renewed his contract in January 2011 until the end of 2011 Campeonato Paraibano.
