= Jonathan (footballer, born 1992) =

Brazilian footballer

Personal information
- Full name: Jonathan Francisco Lemos
- Date of birth: 25 August 1992 (age 34)
- Place of birth: Brasília, Brazil
- Height: 1.78 m (5 ft 10 in)
- Position: Right back

Team information
- Current team: Botafogo-SP
- Number: 2

Youth career
- Brasiliense

Senior career*
Years	Team	Apps	(Gls)
2010–2012	Brasiliense	8	(0)
2012	XV de Piracicaba	0	(0)
2013–2014	Capivariano	6	(0)
2013	→ Comercial-SP (loan)	0	(0)
2014	Ponte Preta	0	(0)
2015	Água Santa	14	(0)
2015	→ Portuguesa (loan)	14	(1)
2015–2021	Água Santa	15	(0)
2016–2019	→ Atlético Goianiense (loan)	97	(2)
2020–2021	→ Coritiba (loan)	24	(1)
2021	Botafogo	17	(0)
2022	Bahia	8	(0)
2022–2023	CSA	12	(0)
2023–2025	Criciúma	59	(1)
2026–	Botafogo-SP	18	(1)
- * Club domestic league appearances and goals as of 18 November 2026

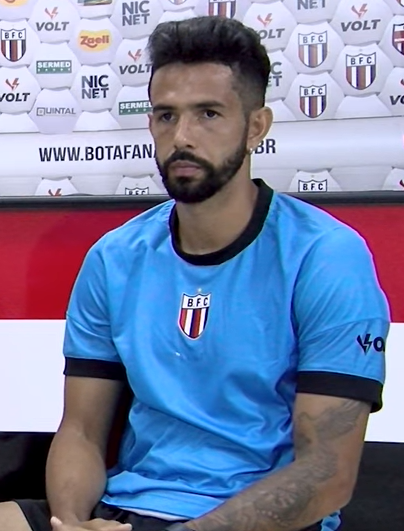
Jonathan Francisco Lemos, Brazilian right-back.

Jonathan Francisco Lemos (born 25 August 1992), simply known as Jonathan, is a Brazilian footballer who plays as a right back for Botafogo-SP.

== Club career ==
Born in Brasília, Distrito Federal, Jonathan finished his formation with hometown club Brasiliense. On 14 August 2010 he made his first team debut, starting in a 2–2 home draw against Guaratinguetá for the Série B championship.

In 2013 Jonathan moved to Capivariano, after a brief stint at XV de Piracicaba. On 10 July 2013 he was loaned to Comercial-SP, appearing with the side in that year's Copa Paulista.

In the 2014 summer Jonathan signed for Ponte Preta, but after failing to make an appearance for the side during the year, moved to Água Santa on 11 December.

On 19 May 2015 Jonathan joined Portuguesa, on loan until the end of the year.

== Honours ==
Botafogo

- Campeonato Brasileiro Série B: 2021

Criciúma

- Recopa Catarinense: 2024
