= Victor Bolt =

Brazilian footballer (born 1987)

Personal information
- Full name: Victor Gomes Lemos
- Date of birth: 14 April 1987 (age 39)
- Place of birth: Rio de Janeiro, Brazil
- Height: 1.78 m (5 ft 10 in)
- Position: Defensive midfielder

Team information
- Current team: Botafogo-SP
- Number: 8

Youth career
- Flamengo (7-a-side)

Senior career*
| Years | Team | Apps | (Gls) |
| 2011–2013 | Olaria | 30 | (1) |
| 2011–2012 | → Belenenses (loan) | 25 | (4) |
| 2012 | → Bahia (loan) | 7 | (0) |
| 2014 | Madureira | 17 | (4) |
| 2015–2016 | Vasco da Gama | 0 | (0) |
| 2015 | → Portuguesa (loan) | 15 | (0) |
| 2016 | → Vila Nova (loan) | 29 | (2) |
| 2017–2018 | Goiás | 23 | (1) |
| 2018–2020 | Heilongjiang FC | 42 | (10) |
| 2020– | Botafogo-SP | 0 | (0) |
- * Club domestic league appearances and goals as of 14 September 2019

Victor Gomes Lemos (born 14 April 1987), known as Victor Bolt or formerly Victor Lemos, is a Brazilian footballer who plays for Botafogo-SP as a defensive midfielder.

== Club career ==
Born in Rio de Janeiro, Victor Lemos made his senior debuts with Olaria, after representing Flamengo in the seven-a-side category. In June 2011 he moved abroad for the first time of his career, joining Segunda Liga side Belenenses.

After scoring four goals in 24 matches Victor returned to Brazil, and signed for Bahia on 19 July 2012. He made his Série A debut on 15 August, starting in a 2–0 away win against Ponte Preta.

After appearing sparingly Victor Bolt returned to Olaria, but moved to Madureira on 9 January 2014. After being the club's topscorer in the year's Série C, he signed a one-year loan deal with Vasco da Gama.

On 19 May 2015 Victor Bolt was loaned to Portuguesa, until December. On 6 November of that year he moved to Vila Nova.

== Career statistics ==
=== Club ===
As of 2 March 2023

Appearances and goals by club, season and competition
| Club | Season | League | | | State League | | National Cup | | League Cup | | Continental | | Other | | Total | |
| Club | Season | Division | Apps | Goals | Apps | Goals | Apps | Goals | Apps | Goals | Apps | Goals | Apps | Goals | Apps | Goals |
|---|---|---|---|---|---|---|---|---|---|---|---|---|---|---|---|---|
| Olaria | 2011 | — | | | 16 | 1 | — | | — | | — | | — | | 16 | 1 |
| Olaria | 2013 | — | | | 14 | 0 | — | | — | | — | | — | | 14 | 0 |
| Olaria | Total | | — | | 30 | 1 | — | | — | | — | | — | | 30 | 1 |
| Belenenses (loan) | 2011–12 | Liga de Honra | 25 | 4 | — | | 3 | 1 | 4 | 2 | — | | — | | 7 | 0 |
| Bahia (loan) | 2012 | Série A | 7 | 0 | — | | — | | — | | 1 | 0 | — | | 8 | 0 |
| Madureira | 2014 | Série C | 17 | 4 | 12 | 1 | — | | — | | — | | — | | 29 | 5 |
| Vasco da Gama | 2015 | Série A | — | | 1 | 0 | 1 | 0 | — | | — | | — | | 2 | 0 |
| Portuguesa (loan) | 2015 | Série C | 15 | 0 | — | | — | | — | | — | | — | | 15 | 0 |
| Vila Nova (loan) | 2016 | Série B | 29 | 2 | 13 | 0 | — | | — | | — | | 5 | 0 | 47 | 2 |
| Goiás | 2017 | Série B | 23 | 1 | 15 | 0 | 6 | 0 | — | | — | | — | | 44 | 1 |
| Heilongjiang Lava Spring | 2018 | China League One | 22 | 8 | — | | 0 | 0 | — | | — | | — | | 22 | 8 |
| Heilongjiang Lava Spring | 2019 | China League One | 20 | 2 | — | | 0 | 0 | — | | — | | — | | 20 | 2 |
| Heilongjiang Lava Spring | Total | | 42 | 10 | — | | 0 | 0 | — | | — | | — | | 42 | 10 |
| Botafogo-SP | 2020 | Série B | 22 | 1 | 9 | 0 | — | | — | | — | | — | | 31 | 1 |
| Botafogo-SP | 2021 | Série C | 14 | 0 | 10 | 0 | — | | — | | — | | — | | 24 | 0 |
| Botafogo-SP | Total | | 36 | 1 | 19 | 0 | — | | — | | — | | — | | 55 | 1 |
| São Bento | 2022 | — | | | 11 | 0 | — | | — | | — | | — | | 11 | 0 |
| Comercial | 2023 | — | | | 10 | 0 | — | | — | | — | | — | | 10 | 0 |
| Career total | | | 204 | 22 | 111 | 2 | 10 | 1 | 4 | 2 | 1 | 0 | 5 | 0 | 335 | 27 |

== Honours ==
Vila Nova

- Campeonato Goiano Série B: 2015
- Campeonato Brasileiro Série C: 2015
