= Igor (footballer, born 1989) =

Brazilian footballer

Personal information
- Full name: Igor Gerônimo Silva de Oliveira
- Date of birth: 16 December 1989 (age 36)
- Place of birth: Cuiabá, Brazil
- Height: 1.81 m (5 ft 11 1/2 in)
- Position: Forward

Youth career
- Mixto

Senior career*
Years	Team	Apps	(Gls)
2008–2009	Mixto		
2009–2012	Paraná	15	(1)
2011	→ Rio Branco-PR (loan)	7	(0)
2012	→ São Carlos (loan)	15	(3)
2012	→ Mixto (loan)	10	(1)
2013	Cuiabá	14	(5)
2014–2015	CRB	0	(0)
2015	Portuguesa	5	(0)
2016	Cuiabá	0	(0)
- * Club domestic league appearances and goals as of 15 September 2015

Igor Gerônimo Silva de Oliveira (born 16 December 1989), simply known as Igor, is a Brazilian footballer who plays for Cuiabá as a forward.

== Club career ==
Born in Cuiabá, Mato Grosso, Igor made his debuts as a senior with Mixto. In April 2009 he moved to Paraná, and made his debut for the club on 1 August, coming on as a second-half substitute in a 1–2 away loss against Duque de Caxias for the Série B championship.

After being rarely used, Igor was loaned to Rio Branco-PR, São Carlos and his former club Mixto. In 2013, already a free agent, he signed for Cuiabá.

In October 2013 Igor moved to CRB. After being rarely used, he joined Portuguesa on 11 June 2015.

Igor returned to Cuiabá in 2016. After trying to assault his manager Fernando Marchiori during a match against Operário-VG in April, he was released.
