= Fabinho Capixaba =

Brazilian footballer (born 1983)

Personal information
- Full name: Antônio Fábio Francês Cavalcante
- Date of birth: 27 November 1983 (age 42)
- Place of birth: Vitória, Brazil
- Height: 1.79 m (5 ft 10 in)
- Position: Right-back

Youth career
- Desportiva

Senior career*
Years	Team	Apps	(Gls)
2002–2003	América Mineiro		
2002	→ Club América (loan)		
2003–2004	Sãocarlense		
2004	São Cristóvão		
2004–2005	Sertãozinho		
2005	Marília		
2006	União Barbarense		
2006	Pogoń Szczecin	1	(0)
2007	Americano		
2007	Volta Redonda		
2008	Mirassol		
2008–2013	Palmeiras	18	(0)
2009	→ Avaí (loan)	13	(1)
2010	→ Coritiba (loan)	18	(1)
2011	→ Mirassol (loan)	10	(0)
2011–2012	→ Criciúma (loan)	14	(0)
2013	→ Joinville (loan)	4	(0)
2014	Atlético Sorocaba	12	(0)
2015	Portuguesa	0	(0)
2016	CEOV	0	(0)
2017	Sertãozinho	4	(0)
- * Club domestic league appearances and goals

Antônio Fábio Francês Cavalcante (born 27 November 1983), commonly known as Fabinho Capixaba, is a Brazilian former professional footballer who played as a right-back.

== Career ==
Born in Vitória, Espírito Santo, Fabinho Capixaba graduated from Desportiva's youth setup, but made his senior debuts for América Mineiro. After a loan stint at Club América, he went on to appear at several countryside clubs of São Paulo and Rio de Janeiro (with a short stint at Polish Ekstraklasa side Pogoń Szczecin).

On 5 May 2008, Fabinho Capixaba joined Série A side Palmeiras. He appeared regularly for the club during the year, but eventually lost his space in 2009.

On 5 August 2009, Fabinho Capixaba was loaned to Avaí until December. He subsequently served another temporary deals at Coritiba, Mirassol, Criciúma and Joinville before being released by Verdão in 2013.

On 12 December 2013, Fabinho Capixaba signed for Atlético Sorocaba, newly promoted to Campeonato Paulista Série A1. He appeared regularly for the side, which was immediately relegated back.

On 28 January 2015, Fabinho Capixaba was presented at Portuguesa.

== Honours ==
Sertãozinho

- Campeonato Paulista Série A3: 2004

Coritiba

- Campeonato Paranaense: 2010
- Campeonato Brasileiro Série B: 2010
