= Osvaldir =

Brazilian footballer

Personal information
- Full name: Osvaldir Araújo Euzébio
- Date of birth: 15 May 1987 (age 39)
- Place of birth: Ipatinga, Brazil
- Height: 1.81 m (5 ft 11 1/2 in)
- Position: Right back

Team information
- Current team: Villa Nova

Youth career
- 2004–2005: Ipatinga
- 2006–2007: América-MG

Senior career*
Years	Team	Apps	(Gls)
2007	URT		
2008	Formiga		
2009	Funorte		
2009	Villa Nova		
2010–2011	América-TO	22	(0)
2010	→ Linense (loan)	0	(0)
2011	Ipatinga	3	(0)
2012	Oeste	0	(0)
2012	Marcílio Dias	0	(0)
2012	Concórdia	4	(0)
2013	Araxá	10	(0)
2013	CAP Uberlândia		
2014	Campinense	0	(0)
2014	Madureira	4	(0)
2015	Democrata-GV	10	(0)
2015	Campinense	0	(0)
2015	Portuguesa	4	(0)
2016	Nacional-AM	5	(0)
2016	Remo	2	(0)
2017–	Villa Nova	0	(0)
- * Club domestic league appearances and goals as of 18 September 2016

Osvaldir Araújo Euzébio (born 15 May 1987), simply known as Osvaldir, is a Brazilian footballer who plays for Villa Nova as a right back.

== Club career ==
Born in Ipatinga, Minas Gerais, Osvaldir made his senior debuts with URT in 2007. He rarely settled with a club in the following years, representing Formiga, Funorte, Villa Nova, América-TO (two stints), Linense, Ipatinga, Oeste, Marcílio Dias, Concórdia, Araxá, CAP Uberlândia, Campinense (two stints), Madureira, Democrata-GV and Portuguesa.
