= Gustavo Cascardo =

Brazilian footballer (born 1997)

Personal information
- Full name: Gustavo Cascardo de Assis
- Date of birth: 24 March 1997 (age 29)
- Place of birth: Mogi das Cruzes, Brazil
- Height: 1.74 m (5 ft 8 1/2 in)
- Position: Right back

Team information
- Current team: Sepsi OSK
- Number: 2

Youth career
- 2006–2015: Portuguesa
- 2016–2017: Atlético Paranaense

Senior career*
| Years | Team | Apps | (Gls) |
| 2015 | Portuguesa | 4 | (0) |
| 2017–2020 | Athletico Paranaense | 10 | (0) |
| 2018–2019 | → Vitória Setúbal (loan) | 7 | (0) |
| 2019–2020 | → Senica (loan) | 16 | (0) |
| 2020–2021 | Botafogo | 1 | (0) |
| 2022 | Confiança | 10 | (0) |
| 2023 | Campinense | 0 | (0) |
| 2023–2024 | Beroe | 32 | (0) |
| 2024–2026 | Arda Kardzhali | 59 | (1) |
| 2026– | Sepsi OSK | 13 | (0) |
- * Club domestic league appearances and goals as of 8 November 2026

Gustavo Cascardo de Assis (born 24 March 1997), known as Gustavo Cascardo, is a Brazilian footballer who plays as a right back for Liga I club Sepsi OSK.

== Career ==
Born in Mogi das Cruzes, São Paulo, Cascardo joined Portuguesa's youth setup in 2006, aged nine. On 13 January 2015, after appearing in the year's Copa São Paulo de Futebol Júnior, he was promoted to the main squad.

After being included in the 28-man list for the year's Campeonato Paulista, Cascardo made his professional debut on 8 April, coming on as a second-half substitute in a 0–3 away loss against São Paulo.

On 12 September 2015 Cascardo rescinded his contract, and moved to Atlético Paranaense. After returning to the youth setup, he was promoted to the main squad ahead of the 2017 season, and made his Série A debut on 25 June of that year by starting in a 4–1 home routing of Vitória.

In January 2019, after being rarely used, Cascardo moved abroad and joined Primeira Liga side Vitória F.C. on loan for six months. He also spent the 2019–20 campaign on loan at Slovakia's FK Senica.

On 25 September 2020, free agent Cascardo signed a one-year contract with Botafogo still in the top tier.

In February 2024, he put pen to paper on a two-and-a-half-year contract with Arda Kardzhali.

== Honours ==
Athletico Paranaense

- Campeonato Paranaense: 2018, 2020
