= Anderson (footballer, born November 1983) =

Brazilian footballer

Personal information
- Full name: Anderson Pedro da Silva Nunes Campos
- Date of birth: 20 November 1983 (age 42)
- Place of birth: Recife, Brazil
- Height: 1.89 m (6 ft 2 1/2 in)
- Position: Goalkeeper

Youth career
- 1997–1998: Sport Recife
- 2001–2003: Santa Cruz

Senior career*
Years	Team	Apps	(Gls)
2003–2008	Santa Cruz		
2008–2009	Comercial-SP	3	(0)
2009	→ Ferroviário (loan)		
2009	→ Campinense (loan)	1	(0)
2010	América-PE	6	(0)
2011–2013	Mogi Mirim	22	(0)
2012	→ CRB (loan)	16	(0)
2013	→ Ituano (loan)	15	(0)
2013	Oeste	0	(0)
2014	Linense	15	(0)
2014	Oeste	24	(0)
2015	Linense	15	(0)
2015	Portuguesa	6	(0)
2016	Grêmio Novorizontino	6	(0)
2016–2020	Bahia	40	(0)
- * Club domestic league appearances and goals as of 2 May 2019

Anderson Pedro da Silva Nunes Campos (born 20 November 1983), simply known as Anderson, is a Brazilian footballer

== Club career ==
Born in Recife, Pernambuco, Anderson finished his formation with hometown club Santa Cruz. He made his Série A debut for the side on 25 October 2006, starting in a 0–1 home loss against Fortaleza.

In 2008 Anderson left the club, and subsequently signed for Comercial de Ribeirão Preto. After loan stints at Ferroviário and Campinense, he joined América-PE in 2010.

In October 2010 Anderson moved to Mogi Mirim, after being approved by the club's president Rivaldo. He also served temporary deals at CRB and Ituano, both as a starter.

Anderson subsequently had two stints at Oeste and Linense. On 18 August 2015 Anderson signed a one-year deal with Portuguesa.

== Honours ==
Santa Cruz

- Campeonato Pernambucano: 2005

Bahia

- Copa do Nordeste: 2017
- Campeonato Baiano: 2018, 2019, 2020
