= Guilherme Queiróz =

Brazilian footballer (born 1990)

Personal information
- Full name: Guilherme de Queiróz Gonçalves
- Date of birth: 23 May 1990 (age 36)
- Place of birth: Novo Horizonte, Brazil
- Height: 1.79 m (5 ft 10 in)
- Position: Forward

Team information
- Current team: Botafogo-SP
- Number: 17

Youth career
- 2008–2009: Atlético Sorocaba

Senior career*
Years	Team	Apps	(Gls)
2010	Monte Azul	2	(0)
2011–2012	Mirassol	3	(0)
2012	José Bonifácio	11	(3)
2013–2015	Novorizontino	60	(23)
2014	→ Juventude (loan)	4	(0)
2015	Portuguesa	19	(12)
2016	Figueirense	10	(0)
2016	Paraná	13	(1)
2017	São Bento	8	(0)
2017	Portuguesa	19	(14)
2018–2019	Juventude	36	(8)
2019	→ Santa Cruz (loan)	22	(2)
2019	→ Brasil de Pelotas (loan)	16	(4)
2020–2021	Novorizontino	58	(17)
2022	Vitória	11	(1)
2022	São Bernardo	11	(1)
2023–2024	Brusque	80	(21)
2025	São Bernardo	16	(2)
2025–	Botafogo-SP	32	(2)
- * Club domestic league appearances and goals as of 18 November 2026

Guilherme de Queiróz Gonçalves (born 23 May 1990), known as Guilherme Queiróz, is a Brazilian footballer who plays for Botafogo-SP as a forward.

== Club career ==
Born in Novo Horizonte, São Paulo, Guilherme Queiróz graduated with Atlético Sorocaba's youth setup. In 2010, he moved to Monte Azul, and made his professional debut on 6 March, coming on as a late substitute in a 1–1 away draw against Bragantino for the Campeonato Paulista championship.

In 2011, Guilherme Queiróz joined Mirassol, but he signed for Grêmio Novorizontino in 2013 after appearing sparingly a short spell at José Bonifácio. On 9 July 2014, he was loaned to Juventude, in Série C.

On 13 May 2015 Guilherme Queiróz moved to another club in the third level, Portuguesa. He scored 12 goals in only 18 appearances, being the division's top scorer as his side missed out promotion in the quarter-finals.

On 17 December 2015 Guilherme Queiróz signed a contract with Série A club Figueirense, after being released by Lusa. He made his debut in the competition on 15 May, replacing Ferrugem in the half-time of a 0–0 home draw against Ponte Preta.

After being rarely used at Figueira, Queiróz subsequently represented Paraná and São Bento before returning to Portuguesa on 20 May 2017.

== Honours ==
=== Club ===
Novorizontino

- Campeonato Paulista Série A3: 2014

=== Individual ===
- Campeonato Brasileiro Série C Top goalscorer: 2015
