= Sport Club Barueri =

Brazilian football club

Sport Barueri
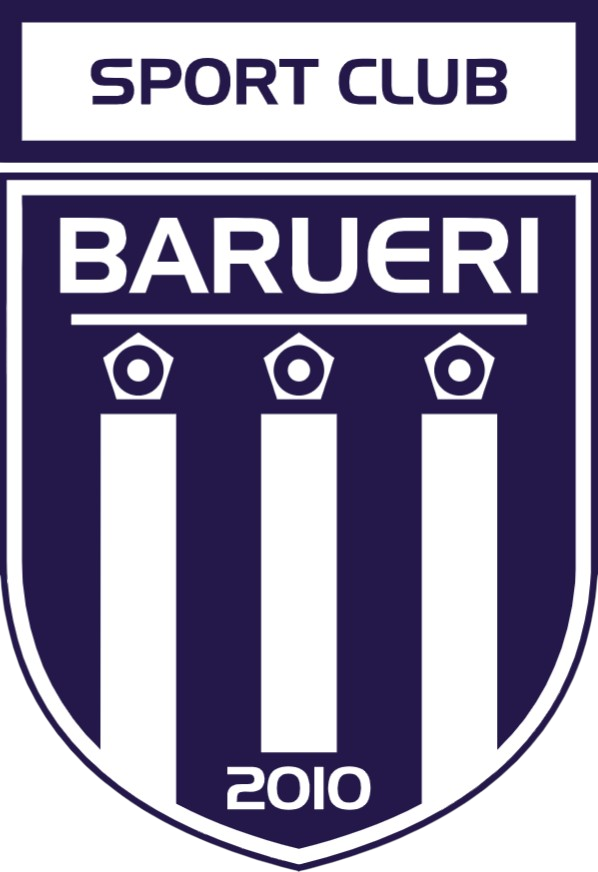
- Full name: Sport Club Barueri
- Nickname: O Time do Povo
- Founded: 1 January 1998 as Campinas Futebol Clube; 9 October 2009 as Sport Club Barueri
- Ground: Arena Barueri
- Capacity: 16,419
- President: Domingos Ferreira de Brito
- Website: http://www.scbarueri.com/
Home colours	Away colours

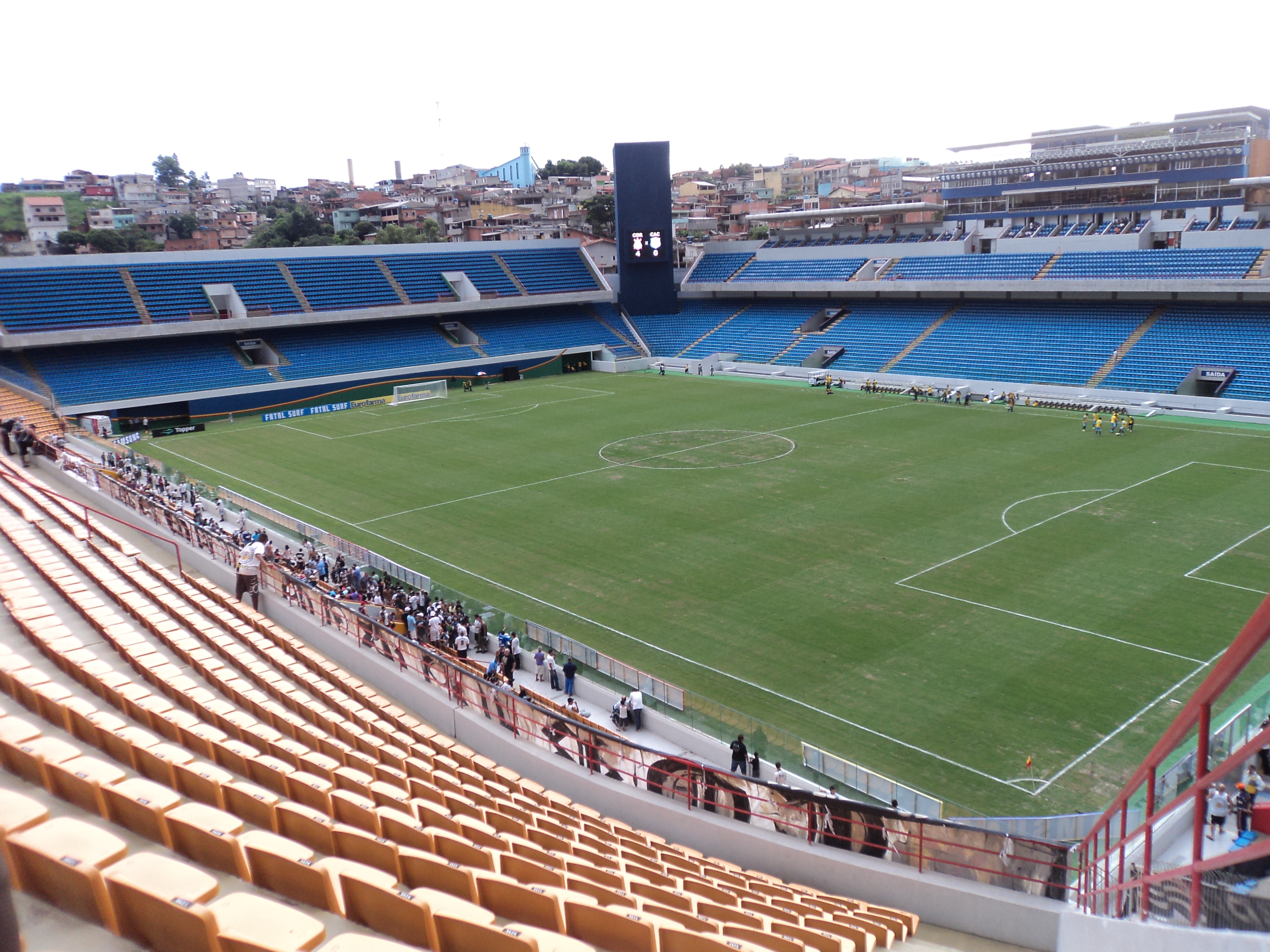
Arena Barueri

Sport Club Barueri, commonly known as Sport Barueri, is a currently inactive Brazilian football club based in Barueri, São Paulo.

== History ==
The team was based in Campinas (of Campinas metropolitan area) as Campinas Futebol Clube. It found by Edmar Bernardes and Careca, both played for Campinas-based team Guarani Futebol Clube.

After the major team of Barueri, Grêmio Recreativo Barueri moved to Presidente Prudente (of northwest hinterland) and became Grêmio Prudente Futebol, the club re-located to Barueri (of Greater São Paulo) and changed to current name in 2010. However Grêmio Barueri moved back to Barueri in 2011.

The team was based in Estádio CERECAMP, Campinas. Guarani Futebol Clube, Ponte Preta and Red Bull Brasil were the city rival of the team, however the team were in difference level, the last derby between Ponte Preta and Campinas was at 2009 Copa Paulista.
