= Tom (footballer, born 1991) =

Brazilian footballer

Personal information
- Full name: Winiston Cristian Santos
- Date of birth: 30 October 1991 (age 35)
- Place of birth: Aracaju, Brazil
- Height: 1.96 m (6 ft 5 in)
- Position: Goalkeeper

Team information
- Current team: Hamrun Spartans
- Number: 31

Youth career
- 2009–2011: Portuguesa

Senior career*
Years	Team	Apps	(Gls)
2011–2015	Portuguesa	18	(0)
2016	ASA	13	(0)
2016	Nacional-AM	6	(0)
2017	Rio Verde	14	(0)
2017–2018	Grêmio Anápolis	0	(0)
2017–2018	→ Real SC (loan)	22	(0)
2019	Central	2	(0)
2020	Juventus-SP	1	(0)
2021	Cascavel Clube Recreativo	0	(0)
2021–2022	Boa Esporte Clube	0	(0)
2022	CRAC	2	(0)
2022–2023	Qrendi FC	12	(0)
2023–	Hamrun Spartans	2	(0)
- * Club domestic league appearances and goals as of 25 June 2023

Winiston Cristian Santos (born 30 October 1991), commonly known as Tom, is a Brazilian footballer who plays for Hamrun Spartans in Malta, as a goalkeeper.

== Club career ==
Born in Aracaju, Sergipe, Tom graduated from Portuguesa's youth categories, and was promoted to the first-team squad in 2011, acting initially as a backup to Wéverton, Lúcio and Bruno; he remained as a third-choice for the following year.

Tom made his first-team debut on 24 March 2013, starting in a 1–1 draw at Santacruzense for the Paulista Série A2 championship. However, he only appeared in a further more match during the winning campaign, and in the year's Brasileirão, he was again third-choice.

In 2014, Tom was promoted to second-choice goalkeeper, only behind Glédson; he made his professional debut on 9 February 2014, coming on in the 18th minute of a 4–0 home routing over Linense, as the latter suffered an injury.

On 23 November 2015 Tom was released.

== Honours ==
Portuguesa

- Campeonato Paulista Série A2: 2013
- Maltese Premier League: 2022-23
