= Bariri =

Municipality in the state of São Paulo in Brazil

- Municipality
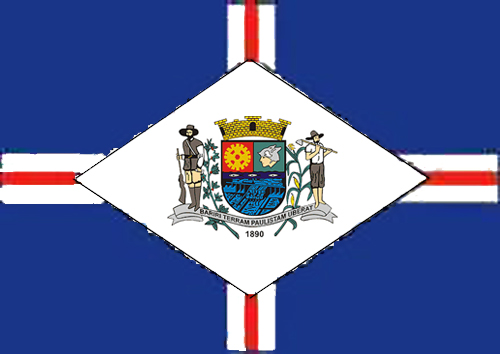
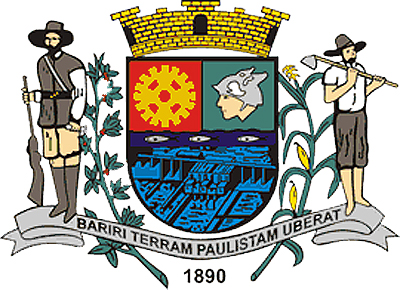
- Flag Coat of arms

- Location in São Paulo state

- Location in Brazil
- Coordinates: 22°4′28″S 48°44′25″W
- Country: Brazil
- Region: Southeast
- State: São Paulo

Area
  - Total: 444 km^{2} (171 sq mi)

Population (2020)
  - Total: 35,558
  - Density: 80.1/km^{2} (207/sq mi)
- Time zone: UTC−3 (BRT)

Bariri is a municipality in the state of São Paulo in Brazil. The population is 35,558 (2020 est.) in an area of 444 km^{2}. The elevation is 447 m (1467 ft).

== Demographics ==
Historical population (municipality)
Year	Population	%±
1920	23,830
1940	24,967	4.8%
1950	22,030	−11.8%
1960	18,439	−16.3%
1970	17,497	−5.1%
1980	19,894	13.7%
1991	24,542	23.4%
2000	28,224	15.0%
2010	31,593	11.9%
2022	31,595	0.0%

== Media ==
In telecommunications, the city was served by Telecomunicações de São Paulo. In July 1998, this company was acquired by Telefónica, which adopted the Vivo brand in 2012. The company is currently an operator of cell phones, fixed lines, internet (fiber optics/4G) and television (satellite and cable).

== See also ==
- List of municipalities in São Paulo
