= Junior Alves (footballer, born 1994) =

Brazilian footballer

Júnior Alves
Personal information
- Full name: Domivânio Alves de Souza Júnior
- Date of birth: 20 March 1994 (age 32)
- Place of birth: Buritis, Brazil
- Height: 1.76 m (5 ft 9 1/2 in)
- Position: Attacking midfielder

Team information
- Current team: Taguatinga

Youth career
- Planalto
- Brasilis
- 2010–2014: Portuguesa

Senior career*
Years	Team	Apps	(Gls)
2014–2015	Portuguesa	9	(0)
2015	→ Inter-SM (loan)	1	(0)
2016	Villa Nova	0	(0)
2016–2017	Maringá	2	(1)
2016–2017	→ Internacional-PB (loan)	6	(0)
2018	CSE	4	(0)
2018	Ceilândia	3	(0)
2019	Capital	2	(0)
2019	Corumbaense	2	(0)
2019	Botafogo-DF	0	(0)
2020–	Taguatinga	10	(1)
- * Club domestic league appearances and goals as of 05:57, 5 August 2020 (UTC)

Domivânio Alves de Souza Júnior, commonly known as Júnior Alves or simply Domivânio (born 20 March 1994), is a Brazilian footballer who plays as an attacking midfielder for Taguatinga.

== Career ==
Born in Buritis, Minas Gerais, Júnior Alves joined Portuguesa's youth categories in November 2010, aged 16, after starting it out at Brasilis. On 12 August 2014 he was called up by manager Silas for the match against ABC.

Júnior Alves made his first team debut on the same day, playing the last 30 minutes of a 0–0 away draw for the Campeonato Brasileiro Série B championship.
