= 2016 Associação Portuguesa de Desportos season =

Portuguesa
2016 season
- President: Leandro Teixeira Duarte (interim)
- Coach: Márcio Ribeiro
- Stadium: Canindé
- Série C: 9th (relegated)
- Campeonato Paulista Série A2: 13th
- Copa do Brasil: 2nd round
- Top goalscorer: League: Bruno Xavier; Bruno Mineiro; Denner; Marcelo (2); All: Gustavo Tocantins (7)
Home colours	Away colours	Third colours

The 2016 season is Associação Portuguesa de Desportos' ninety fourth season in existence and the club's second consecutive season in the third level of Brazilian football.

Portuguesa finished the campaign in 9th position, resulting in relegation to Série D for the first time in its history.

== Players ==
=== Squad information ===
As of 18 September 2016

Name	Pos.	Nat.	Place of birth	Date of birth (age)	Club caps	Club goals	Signed from	Date signed	Fee	Contract End
Goalkeepers
Douglas Lima	GK	(Brazil)	Salvador (Bahia)	26 August 1992 (aged 24)	13	0	Youth System	6 January 2012	Free	31 December 2018
Farley	GK	(Brazil)	Estrela do Indaiá (Minas Gerais)	21 July 1994 (aged 22)	4	0	Youth System	16 August 2015	Free	28 February 2017
Pegorari	GK	(Brazil)	Campinas (São Paulo (state))	21 July 1991 (aged 25)	11	0	Guarani	31 May 2016	Free	30 November 2016
Raphael Alemão	GK	(Brazil)	Piracicaba (São Paulo (state))	17 August 1988 (aged 28)	–	–	Palmeiras	21 May 2016	Loan	30 November 2016
Defenders
Augusto	CB	(Brazil)	Pres. Castelo Branco (Paraná (state))	16 April 1986 (aged 30)	12	0	Água Santa	30 May 2016	Free	30 November 2016
Marcelo	CB	(Brazil)	Ji-Paraná (Rondônia)	19 March 1993 (aged 23)	10	2	Portuguesa-PR	31 May 2016	Free	30 November 2016
Mateus Alves	CB	(Brazil)	Turmalina (Minas Gerais)	2 May 1984 (aged 32)	32	2	Guarani	19 May 2016	Free	30 November 2016
Anderson	LB	(Brazil)	Rio de Janeiro (Rio de Janeiro (state))	10 June 1992 (aged 24)	6	0	Sampaio Corrêa	9 January 2016	Free	30 November 2016
Bruno Oliveira	LB/CB	(Brazil)	Paiçandu (Paraná (state))	9 June 1996 (aged 20)	5	1	Youth System	15 September 2015	Free	31 December 2018
Cesinha	RB/LB	(Brazil)	Pindamonhangaba (São Paulo (state))	31 March 1994 (aged 22)	33	0	Nova Iguaçu	5 January 2016	Free	30 November 2017
Denner	LB	(Brazil)	Guarulhos (São Paulo (state))	21 November 1993 (aged 22)	6	2	FC Cascavel	11 July 2016	Free	30 November 2016
Douglas Oliveira	RB/AM	(Brazil)	Arapongas (Paraná (state))	12 April 1989 (aged 27)	8	0	Juventus-SP	31 May 2016	Free	30 November 2016
Midfielders
Alê	DM/CB	(Brazil)	São Paulo (São Paulo (state))	2 January 1986 (aged 30)	13	0	São Bento	7 June 2016	Free	30 November 2016
Caíque	DM	(Brazil)	Guarulhos (São Paulo (state))	10 October 1995 (aged 20)	27	0	Youth System	5 January 2015	Free	31 December 2018
Dudu Vieira	DM	(Brazil)	Campo Grande (Mato Grosso do Sul)	20 February 1994 (aged 22)	3	0	Santo André	10 June 2016	Free	30 November 2016
Ronaldo	DM	(Brazil)	Capivari (São Paulo (state))	27 January 1995 (aged 21)	15	0	Youth System	22 September 2015	Free	31 May 2018
Vilson	DM	(Brazil)	Londrina (Paraná (state))	27 November 1996 (aged 19)	–	–	Portuguesa-PR	16 June 2016	Free	15 December 2016
Vinicius	DM	(Brazil)	São Paulo (São Paulo (state))	30 April 1996 (aged 20)	24	0	Youth System	14 May 2015	Free	31 December 2018
Bruno Xavier	AM	(Brazil)	São Paulo (São Paulo (state))	27 November 1996 (aged 19)	11	2	Youth System	8 June 2015	Free	31 May 2018
Daniel Ferreira	AM/SS	(Brazil)	São Paulo (São Paulo (state))	21 September 1991 (aged 24)	3	0	América-RN	11 July 2016	Free	30 November 2016
Junior Timbó	AM	(Brazil)	Feira de Santana (Bahia)	14 November 1990 (aged 25)	15	4	Bragantino	20 July 2016	Free	30 November 2016
Michel Pires	AM	(Brazil)	Rio de Janeiro (Rio de Janeiro (state))	25 June 1989 (aged 27)	6	0	Gama	2 August 2016	Free	30 November 2016
Leonardo	AM	(Brazil)	Taubaté (São Paulo (state))	18 August 1995 (aged 21)	14	0	Independente	30 May 2016	Free	30 November 2016
Rafael Vicentini	AM	(Brazil)	Mairinque (São Paulo (state))	14 February 1995 (aged 21)	1	0	Youth System	2 December 2015	Free	31 December 2018
Forwards
Bruno Duarte	ST	(Brazil)	São Paulo (São Paulo (state))	24 March 1996 (aged 20)	6	0	Youth System	25 May 2016	Free	31 May 2018
Bruno Mineiro	ST	(Brazil)	Belo Horizonte (Minas Gerais)	2 February 1983 (aged 33)	45	18	Santa Cruz	26 February 2016	Free	31 December 2017
Guilherme	SS	(Brazil)	Brasília (Federal District (Brazil))	10 October 1995 (aged 20)	8	0	Atlético-PR	30 November 2015	Loan	31 December 2016
Gileard	ST	(Brazil)	Rosário (Maranhão)	30 May 1996 (aged 20)	1	0	Maranhão	22 August 2016	Free	30 May 2017
João Henrique	SS/ST	(Brazil)	Ribeirão Preto (São Paulo (state))	13 January 1987 (aged 29)	5	0	Flamurtari (Albania)	2 August 2016	Free	30 November 2016
John Lennon	ST	(Brazil)	Lapão (Bahia)	5 January 1992 (aged 24)	3	0	São Luiz-RS	6 July 2016	Free	30 November 2016
Nunes	ST	(Brazil)	São Paulo (São Paulo (state))	21 January 1982 (aged 34)	8	0	Botafogo-SP	5 July 2016	Free	30 November 2016
Piauí	SS/ST	(Brazil)	Teresina (Piauí)	15 February 1997 (aged 19)	1	0	Youth System	7 August 2016	Free	31 December 2018
Renato Kayser	SS/ST	(Brazil)	Tupãssi (Paraná (state))	17 February 1996 (aged 20)	5	0	Vasco	21 May 2016	Loan	31 December 2016
Valdeci	SS/AM	(Brazil)	Fortaleza (Ceará)	26 March 1995 (aged 21)	2	0	Ferroviário	29 June 2016	Free	30 November 2016

=== Appearances and goals ===
Pos.	Nat	Name	Brasileiro Série C		Paulistão Série A2		Copa do Brasil		Total	
Pos.	Nat	Name	Apps	Goals	Apps	Goals	Apps	Goals	Apps	Goals
GK	(Brazil)	Douglas Lima	7	0	5	0	0+1	0	13	0
GK	(Brazil)	Farley	0	0	4	0	0	0	4	0
GK	(Brazil)	Pegorari	11	0	0	0	0	0	11	0
GK	(Brazil)	Raphael Alemão	0	0	0	0	0	0	0	0
DF	(Brazil)	Augusto	12	0	0	0	0	0	12	0
DF	(Brazil)	Marcelo	10	2	0	0	0	0	10	2
DF	(Brazil)	Mateus Alves	9	0	0	0	0	0	9	0
DF	(Brazil)	Anderson	0	0	6	0	0	0	6	0
DF	(Brazil)	Bruno Oliveira	5	1	0	0	0	0	5	1
DF	(Brazil)	Cesinha	14+1	0	13+1	0	4	0	33	0
DF	(Brazil)	Denner	6	2	0	0	0	0	6	2
DF	(Brazil)	Douglas Oliveira	7+1	0	0	0	0	0	8	0
MF	(Brazil)	Alê	12+1	0	0	0	0	0	13	0
MF	(Brazil)	Caíque	6+3	0	8+6	0	0+1	0	24	0
MF	(Brazil)	Ronaldo	14+1	0	0	0	0	0	15	0
MF	(Brazil)	Vilson	0	0	0	0	0	0	0	0
MF	(Brazil)	Vinicius	7+5	0	0+1	0	2	0	15	0
MF	(Brazil)	Bruno Xavier	6+2	2	0	0	0+1	0	9	2
MF	(Brazil)	Daniel Ferreira	3	0	0	0	0	0	3	0
MF	(Brazil)	Junior Timbó	2+1	0	0	0	0	0	3	0
MF	(Brazil)	Michel Pires	5+1	0	0	0	0	0	6	0
MF	(Brazil)	Leonardo	11+3	0	0	0	0	0	14	0
MF	(Brazil)	Rafael Vicentini	0+1	0	0	0	0	0	1	0
FW	(Brazil)	Bruno Duarte	3+3	0	0	0	0	0	6	0
FW	(Brazil)	Bruno Mineiro	9+5	2	5	2	4	0	23	4
FW	(Brazil)	Guilherme Schettine	0+2	0	1+5	0	0	0	8	0
FW	(Brazil)	Gileard	0+1	0	0	0	0	0	1	0
FW	(Brazil)	João Henrique	4+1	0	0	0	0	0	5	0
FW	(Brazil)	John Lennon	1+2	0	0	0	0	0	3	0
FW	(Brazil)	Nunes	4+4	0	0	0	0	0	8	0
FW	(Brazil)	Renato Kayser	2+3	0	0	0	0	0	5	0
FW	(Brazil)	Valdeci	1+1	0	0	0	0	0	2	0
Players who left the club during the season
GK	(Brazil)	Luís Carlos	0	0	10	0	4	0	14	0
DF	(Brazil)	Guilherme Almeida	2	0	2+1	0	4	0	9	0
DF	(Brazil)	Luan Peres	0	0	14+1	2	1	0	16	2
DF	(Brazil)	Rafael Zuchi	0	0	5	0	0	0	5	0
DF	(Brazil)	Talis	1	0	12+1	1	4	0	18	1
DF	(Brazil)	Digão	0	0	12+2	0	3	0	17	0
DF	(Brazil)	Rodrigo	2+1	0	0	0	0	0	3	0
MF	(Brazil)	Boquita	1	0	7+1	0	3	0	12	0
MF	(Brazil)	Ferdinando	1+1	0	17	0	4	0	23	0
MF	(Brazil)	Matteus	0	0	7+2	0	0	0	9	0
MF	(Brazil)	Milton Júnior	0	0	4	0	0	0	4	0
MF	(Brazil)	Renan Teixeira	0	0	18	2	0	0	18	2
MF	(Brazil)	André Beleza	0	0	0	0	1	0	1	0
MF	(Brazil)	Caio Cezar	2+5	1	1+3	0	4	1	15	2
MF	(Brazil)	Formiga	0+1	0	0+4	0	0	0	5	0
MF	(Brazil)	Marcelo Labarthe	0+1	0	9+7	0	0+3	0	20	0
MF	(Brazil)	Moacir	0+1	0	5+1	1	0	0	7	1
MF	(Brazil)	Natan	0	0	14+3	2	0	0	17	2
FW	(Brazil)	Bruno Nunes	1	0	6+7	2	0+3	0	17	3
FW	(Brazil)	Diego Gonçalves	7	0	12+7	2	2+2	0	30	3
FW	(Brazil)	Dominic	0	0	2	0	0	0	2	0
FW	(Brazil)	Felipe Alves	5	1	0	0	0	0	5	1
FW	(Brazil)	Gustavo Tocantins	2	1	10	6	4	0	16	7
FW	(Brazil)	Johnathan	0	0	0+4	0	0	0	4	0

Last updated: 24 September 2016
Source: Match reports in Competitive matches, Soccerway

=== Goalscorers ===
Ran	Pos	Nat	Name	Série C	Paulistão A2	Copa do Brasil	Total
1	FW	(Brazil)	Gustavo Tocantins	1	6	0	7
2	FW	(Brazil)	Bruno Mineiro	2	2	0	4
3	FW	(Brazil)	Bruno Nunes	0	2	1	3
3	FW	(Brazil)	Diego Gonçalves	0	2	1	3
4	DF	(Brazil)	Denner	2	0	0	2
4	DF	(Brazil)	Marcelo	2	0	0	2
4	MF	(Brazil)	Bruno Xavier	2	0	0	2
4	MF	(Brazil)	Caio Cezar	1	0	1	2
4	DF	(Brazil)	Luan Peres	0	2	0	2
4	MF	(Brazil)	Natan	0	2	0	2
4	MF	(Brazil)	Renan Teixeira	0	2	0	2
Own goals				1	1	0	2
4	DF	(Brazil)	Bruno Oliveira	1	0	0	1
4	FW	(Brazil)	Felipe Alves	1	0	0	1
4	DF	(Brazil)	Talis	0	1	0	1
4	MF	(Brazil)	Moacir	0	1	0	1
Total				13	21	3	37

Last updated: 11 September 2016
Source: Match reports in Competitive matches

=== Disciplinary record ===
Nat	Pos	Name	Série C			Copa do Brasil			Paulista A2			Total		
Nat	Pos	Name	Yellow card	(yellow card) (yellow-red card)	Red card	Yellow card	(yellow card) (yellow-red card)	Red card	Yellow card	(yellow card) (yellow-red card)	Red card	Yellow card	(yellow card) (yellow-red card)	Red card
(Brazil)	DF	Cesinha	4	0	0	2	0	0	4	0	0	10	0	0
(Brazil)	MF	Caíque	3	0	0	1	0	0	3	0	0	7	0	0
(Brazil)	FW	Diego Gonçalves	1	0	0	3	0	0	2	0	0	6	0	0
(Brazil)	MF	Alê	4	0	0	0	0	0	0	0	0	4	0	0
(Brazil)	FW	Bruno Mineiro	3	0	0	1	0	0	0	0	0	4	0	0
(Brazil)	MF	Natan	0	0	0	0	0	0	4	0	0	4	0	0
(Brazil)	MF	Marcelo Labarthe	0	0	0	1	0	0	3	0	0	4	0	0
(Brazil)	DF	Denner	3	0	1	0	0	0	0	0	0	3	0	1
(Brazil)	DF	Marcelo	3	1	0	0	0	0	0	0	0	3	1	0
(Brazil)	DF	Mateus Alves	3	0	0	0	0	0	0	0	0	3	0	0
(Brazil)	FW	Nunes	3	0	0	0	0	0	0	0	0	3	0	0
(Brazil)	MF	Matteus	0	0	0	0	0	0	3	0	0	3	0	0
(Brazil)	MF	Renan Teixeira	0	0	0	0	0	0	2	1	0	2	1	0
(Brazil)	DF	Mateus Alves	3	0	0	0	0	0	0	0	0	3	0	0
(Brazil)	MF	Ronaldo	2	0	0	0	0	0	0	0	0	2	0	0
(Brazil)	FW	João Henrique	2	0	0	0	0	0	0	0	0	2	0	0
(Brazil)	FW	Felipe Alves	2	0	0	0	0	0	0	0	0	2	0	0
(Brazil)	MF	Caio Cezar	1	0	0	1	0	0	0	0	0	2	0	0
(Brazil)	MF	Vinicius	1	0	0	1	0	0	0	0	0	2	0	0
(Brazil)	MF	Boquita	0	0	0	0	0	0	2	0	0	2	0	0
(Brazil)	DF	Guilherme Almeida	0	0	0	1	0	0	1	0	0	2	0	0
(Brazil)	DF	Talis	0	0	0	1	0	0	1	0	0	2	0	0
(Brazil)	FW	Bruno Nunes	0	0	0	1	0	0	1	0	0	2	0	0
(Brazil)	DF	Augusto	1	1	0	0	0	0	0	0	0	1	1	0
(Brazil)	DF	Douglas Oliveira	1	0	0	0	0	0	0	0	0	1	0	0
(Brazil)	MF	Bruno Xavier	1	0	0	0	0	0	0	0	0	1	0	0
(Brazil)	MF	Daniel Ferreira	1	0	0	0	0	0	0	0	0	1	0	0
(Brazil)	MF	Leonardo	1	0	0	0	0	0	0	0	0	1	0	0
(Brazil)	MF	Michel Pires	1	0	0	0	0	0	0	0	0	1	0	0
(Brazil)	FW	Renato Kayzer	1	0	0	0	0	0	0	0	0	1	0	0
(Brazil)	GK	Farley	0	0	0	0	0	0	1	0	0	1	0	0
(Brazil)	DF	Digão	0	0	0	0	0	0	1	0	0	1	0	0
(Brazil)	DF	Luan Peres	0	0	0	0	0	0	1	0	0	1	0	0
(Brazil)	MF	Milton Júnior	0	0	0	0	0	0	1	0	0	1	0	0
(Brazil)	MF	Ferdinando	0	0	0	1	0	0	0	0	0	1	0	0
(Brazil)	FW	Dominic	0	0	0	0	0	0	1	0	0	1	0	0
(Brazil)	FW	Johnathan	0	0	0	0	0	0	1	0	0	1	0	0
TOTALS			47	2	1	14	0	0	32	1	0	89	3	1

As of 24 September 2016
Source: Match reports in Competitive matches (yellow card) = Number of bookings; (yellow card) (yellow-red card) = Number of sending offs after a second yellow card; (red card) = Number of sending offs by a direct red card.

== Managers ==
Name	Nat.	Place of birth	Date of birth (age)	Signed from	Date signed	Role	Departure	Manner	Contract End
Estevam Soares	(Brazil)	Cafelândia (São Paulo (state))	10 June 1956 (age 70)	Rio Claro	30 June 2015	Permanent	4 February 2016	Resigned	31 May 2016
Felipe Lucena	(Brazil)	Rio de Janeiro (Rio de Janeiro (state))	—N/a	Staff	4 February 2016	Interim	15 February 2016	Ended tenure	—N/a
Ricardinho	(Brazil)	São Paulo (São Paulo (state))	23 May 1976 (age 50)	Free agent	15 February 2016	Permanent	28 March 2016	Sacked	30 November 2016
Anderson Beraldo	(Brazil)	São Paulo (São Paulo (state))	27 April 1980 (age 46)	Staff	28 March 2016	Permanent (Note: Initially an interim manager, he was fully appointed as manager on 8 April)	12 June 2016	Sacked	31 December 2016
Jorginho	(Brazil)	São Paulo (São Paulo (state))	22 May 1965 (age 61)	Free agent	13 June 2016	Permanent	22 August 2016	Resigned	31 December 2016
Márcio Ribeiro	(Brazil)	Palmeira d'Oeste (São Paulo (state))	12 March 1957 (age 69)	Free agent	22 August 2016	Permanent			31 December 2016

== Transfers ==
=== In ===
No.	Pos.	Nat.	Name	Age	EU	Moving from	Type	Transfer window	Ends	Transfer fee	Source
	MF	(Brazil)	Natan	22	Non-EU	Boa Esporte	Transfer	Winter	2017	Free	
	DF	(Brazil)	Rafael Zuchi	21	Non-EU	Atlético Paranaense	Transfer	Winter	2016	Free	
	FW	(Brazil)	Guilherme	20	Non-EU	Atlético Paranaense	Loan	Winter	2016	Free	
	DF	(Brazil)	Digão	22	Non-EU	Volta Redonda	Transfer	Winter	2016	Free	
	MF	(Brazil)	Matteus	26	Non-EU	Atlético Paranaense	Loan	Winter	2016	Free	
	FW	(Brazil)	Bruno Nunes	25	Non-EU	Ponte Preta	Loan	Winter	2016	Free	
	DF	(Brazil)	Medina	25	Non-EU	Free agent	Trial	Winter	2015	Free	
	FW	(Brazil)	Dominic	20	Non-EU	Atlético Paranaense	Loan	Winter	2016	Free	
	FW	(Brazil)	Lenny	27	Non-EU	Free agent	Trial	Winter	2015	Free	
	MF	(Brazil)	Moacir	26	Non-EU	Campinense	Transfer	Winter	2016	Free	
	FW	(Brazil)	Caio Cezar	19	Non-EU	Cruzeiro	Loan	Winter	2016	Free	
	DF	(Brazil)	Cássio	22	Non-EU	Juventus-SP	Transfer	Winter	2016	Free	
	DF	(Brazil)	Cesinha	21	Non-EU	Nova Iguaçu	Transfer	Winter	2016	Free	
	DF	(Brazil)	Anderson	23	Non-EU	Sampaio Corrêa	Transfer	During season	2016	Free	
	MF	(Brazil)	Marcelo Labarthe	31	Non-EU	Corinthians USA (United States)	Transfer	During season	2016	Free	
	MF	(Brazil)	Milton Júnior	24	Non-EU	Ferroviária	Transfer	During season	2016	Free	
	DF	(Brazil)	Talis	26	Non-EU	União Frederiquense	Transfer	During season	2016	Free	
	GK	(Brazil)	Luís Carlos	28	Non-EU	Ceará	Transfer	During season	2016	Free	
	FW	(Brazil)	Gustavo Tocantins	20	Non-EU	Corinthians	Loan	During season	2016	Free	
	FW	(Brazil)	Bruno Mineiro	33	Non-EU	Mogi Mirim	Transfer	During season	2017	Free	
	MF	(Brazil)	André Beleza	30	Non-EU	Ríver-PI	Transfer	During season	2016	Free	
	DF	(Brazil)	Mateus Alves	32	Non-EU	Guarani	Transfer	During season	2016	Free	
	GK	(Brazil)	Raphael Alemão	27	Non-EU	Palmeiras	Loan	During season	2016	Free	
	GK	(Brazil)	Samuel	22	Non-EU	Coritiba	Loan	During season	2016	Free	
	FW	(Brazil)	Renato Kayser	20	Non-EU	Vasco	Loan	During season	2016	Free	
	GK	(Brazil)	Pegorari	24	Non-EU	Guarani	Transfer	During season	2016	Free	
	DF	(Brazil)	Marcelo	23	Non-EU	Portuguesa Londrinense	Transfer	During season	2016	Free	
	DF	(Brazil)	Douglas Oliveira	27	Non-EU	Juventus-SP	Transfer	During season	2016	Free	
	FW	(Brazil)	Felipe Alves	25	Non-EU	Juventus-SP	Transfer	During season	2016	Free	
	MF	(Brazil)	Leonardo	20	Non-EU	Independente de Limeira	Transfer	During season	2016	Free	
	DF	(Brazil)	Rodrigo	30	Non-EU	Maringá	Transfer	During season	2016	Free	
	DF	(Brazil)	Renato	25	Non-EU	Paulista	Transfer	During season	2016	Free	
	DF	(Brazil)	Augusto	30	Non-EU	Água Santa	Transfer	During season	2016	Free	
	MF	(Brazil)	Alê	30	Non-EU	São Bento	Transfer	During season	2016	Free	
	MF	(Brazil)	Dudu Vieira	22	Non-EU	Santo André	Transfer	During season	2016	Free	
	MF	(Brazil)	Vilson	19	Non-EU	Portuguesa Londrinense	Transfer	During season	2016	Free	
	MF	(Brazil)	Guilherme Lopes	23	Non-EU	Independente de Limeira	Transfer	During season	2016	Free	
	FW	(Brazil)	Valdeci	21	Non-EU	Ferroviário	Transfer	During season	2016	Free	
	FW	(Brazil)	Nunes	34	Non-EU	Botafogo-SP	Transfer	During season	2016	Free	
	FW	(Brazil)	John Lennon	24	Non-EU	São Luiz-RS	Transfer	During season	2016	Free	
	MF	(Brazil)	Daniel Ferreira	24	Non-EU	América-RN	Transfer	During season	2016	Free	
	DF	(Brazil)	Denner	22	Non-EU	FC Cascavel	Transfer	During season	2016	Free	
	MF	(Brazil)	Junior Timbó	25	Non-EU	Bragantino	Transfer	During season	2016	Free	
	MF	(Brazil)	Michel Pires	27	Non-EU	Gama	Transfer	During season	2016	Free	
	FW	(Brazil)	João Henrique	29	Non-EU	Flamurtari Vlorë (Albania)	Transfer	During season	2016	Free	

Total spending: ▼ R$ 0.00

=== Out ===
No.	Pos.	Nat.	Name	Age	EU	Moving to	Type	Transfer window	Transfer fee	Source
	GK	(Brazil)	Tom	24	Non-EU	ASA	Released	Winter	Free	
	DF	(Brazil)	Jonathan	23	Non-EU	Água Santa	Loan return	Winter	Free	
	DF	(Brazil)	Anderson Luiz	33	Non-EU	Boavista	Released	Winter	Free	
	DF	(Brazil)	Gustavo Lazzaretti	31	Non-EU	Água Santa	Released	Winter	Free	
	DF	(Brazil)	Gustavo Tabalipa	22	Non-EU	Bragantino	Released	Winter	Free	
	DF	(Brazil)	Dieyson	22	Non-EU	Resende	Released	Winter	Free	
	DF	(Brazil)	Julinho	28	Non-EU	XV de Piracicaba	Released	Winter	Free	
	DF	(Brazil)	Osvaldir	28	Non-EU	Nacional-AM	Released	Winter	Free	
	MF	(Brazil)	Milton Júnior	24	Non-EU	Ferroviária	Released	Winter	Free	
	MF	(Brazil)	Victor Bolt	28	Non-EU	Vila Nova	Released	Winter	Free	
	MF	(Brazil)	Dieguinho	25	Non-EU	Juventude	Released	Winter	Free	
	FW	(Brazil)	Guilherme Queiróz	25	Non-EU	Figueirense	Released	Winter	Free	
	FW	(Brazil)	Hugo	29	Non-EU	Tirana (Albania)	Released	Winter	Free	
	FW	(Brazil)	Igor	25	Non-EU	Cuiabá	Released	Winter	Free	
	FW	(Brazil)	Paulinho	22	Non-EU	Corinthians	Loan return	Winter	Free	
	FW	(Brazil)	Willen	23	Non-EU	Vasco	Loan return	Winter	Free	
	GK	(Brazil)	Anderson	32	Non-EU	Novorizontino	Released	Winter	Free	
	MF	(Brazil)	Renan Teixeira	31	Non-EU	São Bento	Released	During season	Free	
	DF	(Brazil)	Rafael Zuchi	21	Non-EU	Sampaio Corrêa	Released	During season	Free	
	MF	(Brazil)	Natan	23	Non-EU	Fortaleza	Released	During season	Free	
	DF	(Brazil)	Luan Peres	21	Non-EU	Santa Cruz	Contract rescinded	During season	Free	
	GK	(Brazil)	Luís Carlos	28	Non-EU	Guarani	Contract ended	During season	Free	
	DF	(Brazil)	Digão	23	Non-EU	Adanaspor (Turkey)	Contract rescinded	During season	Free	
	MF	(Brazil)	Milton Júnior	25	Non-EU	Red Bull Brasil	Contract rescinded	During season	Free	
	MF	(Brazil)	Moacir	27	Non-EU	Rio Claro	Contract rescinded	During season	Free	
	MF	(Brazil)	Boquita	26	Non-EU	Free agent	Contract rescinded	During season	Free	
	DF	(Brazil)	Talis	26	Non-EU	Free agent	Contract rescinded	During season	Free	
	MF	(Brazil)	André Beleza	31	Non-EU	Free agent	Contract rescinded	During season	Free	
	FW	(Brazil)	Johnathan	24	Non-EU	Free agent	Contract rescinded	During season	Free	
	DF	(Brazil)	Cássio	22	Non-EU	Barbadás (Spain)	Contract rescinded	During season	Free	
	GK	(Brazil)	Samuel	22	Non-EU	Coritiba	Loan return	During season	Free	
	DF	(Brazil)	Guilherme Almeida	23	Non-EU	Free agent	Contract rescinded	During season	Free	
	MF	(Brazil)	Marcelo Labarthe	31	Non-EU	Ypiranga-RS	Contract rescinded	During season	Free	
	FW	(Brazil)	Bruno Nunes	25	Non-EU	Marítimo (Portugal)	Contract rescinded	During season	Free	
	MF	(Brazil)	Matteus	26	Non-EU	Atlético Paranaense	Loan return	During season	Free	
	FW	(Brazil)	Gustavo Tocantins	20	Non-EU	Estoril (Portugal)	Contract rescinded	During season	Free	
	MF	(Brazil)	Ferdinando	36	Non-EU	Free agent	Contract rescinded	During season	Free	
	GK	(Brazil)	Vinicius Nigre	23	Non-EU	Free agent	Contract rescinded	During season	Free	
	DF	(Brazil)	Rodrigo	30	Non-EU	Free agent	Contract rescinded	During season	Free	
	FW	(Brazil)	Caio Cezar	20	Non-EU	Cruzeiro	Loan return	During season	Free	
	FW	(Brazil)	Diego Gonçalves	21	Non-EU	Internacional	Contract rescinded	During season	Free	
	FW	(Brazil)	Felipe Alves	25	Non-EU	Free agent	Contract rescinded	During season	Free	
	FW	(Brazil)	Formiga	21	Non-EU	Free agent	Contract rescinded	During season	Free	
	FW	(Brazil)	Dominic	21	Non-EU	Atlético Paranaense	Loan return	During season	Free	
	DF	(Brazil)	Renato	25	Non-EU	Paulista	Contract rescinded	During season	Free	
	FW	(Brazil)	Guilherme Lopes	23	Non-EU	Free agent	Contract rescinded	During season	Free	

Total gaining: ▲ R$ 0.00

Balance

R$ 0.00

== Competitions ==
=== Campeonato Paulista Série A2 ===
Pos	Team	Pld	W	D	L	GF	GA	GD	Pts
11	Juventus	19	7	6	6	14	19	−5	27
12	Votuporanguense	19	7	3	9	20	28	−8	24
13	Portuguesa	19	6	6	7	21	25	−4	24
14	Penapolense	19	7	2	10	22	24	−2	23
15	Paulista	19	6	4	9	21	24	−3	22

Updated to match(es) played on 21 May 2016. Source: Soccerway
Rules for classification: 1) points; 2) goal difference; 3) number of goals scored.

==== Matches ====
31 January 1	Barretos	0 – 0	Portuguesa	Barretos
10:00		Report		Stadium: Fortaleza; Attendance: 2,589; Referee: Alessandro Darcie

3 February 2	Portuguesa	0 – 1	Juventus	São Paulo
20:00		Report	21' Adriano Paulista	Stadium: Canindé; Referee: Márcio Roberto Soares

6 February 3	Paulista	1 – 2	Portuguesa	Jundiaí
17:00	Rodrigo Arroz 90+4'	Report	16' Bruno Nunes; 51' Diego Gonçalves	Stadium: Jayme Cintra; Attendance: 1,716; Referee: Adriano de Assis Miranda

10 February 4	Portuguesa	1 – 1	Marília	São Paulo
16:00	Diego Gonçalves 46'		42' Matheus	Stadium: Rua Javari; Attendance: 1,231; Referee: Ilbert Estevam da Silva

13 February 5	Mirassol	1 – 0	Portuguesa	Mirassol
19:00	Renatinho 31'; Betinho (red card) 88'			Stadium: José Maria de Campos Maia; Attendance: 188; Referee: Marcelo Prieto Alfieri

16 February 6	Portuguesa	2 – 1	Velo Clube	São Paulo
20:00	Talis 15'; Luan Peres 87' (pen.)		89' Leleco	Stadium: Canindé; Attendance: 999; Referee: Norberto Luciano Santos da Silveira

19 February 7	Portuguesa	1 – 1	Bragantino	São Paulo
21:30	Luan Peres 45' (pen.)	Report	3' Lincom	Stadium: Canindé; Attendance: 1,835; Referee: Luiz Vanderlei Martinucho

23 February 8	Taubaté	3 – 1	Portuguesa	Taubaté
19:30	Jorge Mauá 3' 73'; Joãozinho 74'	Report	24' Moacir	Stadium: Joaquim de Morais Filho; Referee: Maurício Antonio Fioretti

27 February 9	Portuguesa	1 – 1	Monte Azul	São Paulo
16:00	Rodrigo 47' (o.g.)	Report	5' Diego; (red card) 49' Vinicius	Stadium: Canindé; Attendance: 3,982; Referee: Flávio Rodrigues Guerra

1 March 10	Penapolense	1 – 3	Portuguesa	Penápolis
19:30	Ricardo (red card) 39'; João Victor 79'	Report	28' Bruno Mineiro; 41' Gustavo Tocantins; 90' (pen.) Natan	Stadium: Tenente Carriço; Attendance: 447; Referee: Edson Alves da Silva

4 March 11	União Barbarense	1 – 2	Portuguesa	Santa Bárbara d'Oeste
20:00	Leomar 55'	Report	68' Natan; 88' Renan	Stadium: Antônio Guimarães; Attendance: 1,422; Referee: Leandro Bizzio Marinho

7 March 12	Portuguesa	3 – 2	Independente	São Paulo
19:00	Tocantins 48' 81'; Bruno Mineiro 69' (pen.)		35' Romarinho; (red card) 84' André Pastor; 51' Diogo Medeiros	Stadium: Canindé; Attendance: 1,313; Referee: Cleber Luis Paulino

11 March 13	Guarani	3 – 1	Portuguesa	Campinas
21:30	Lorran 9'; Eduardo 40'; Fumagalli 45'		24' Tocantins	Stadium: Brinco de Ouro; Attendance: 2,199; Referee: Thiago Luis Scarascati

16 March 14	Portuguesa	1 – 1	Santo André	São Paulo
20:00	Renan 49'		50' Carlos	Stadium: Canindé; Attendance: 3,742; Referee: Luiz Vanderlei Martinucho

19 March 15	Batatais	3 – 0	Portuguesa	Batatais
21:30	Baiano 5' 35'; Raphael Toledo 78'			Stadium: Oswaldo Scatena; Attendance: 2,492; Referee: Rodrigo Gomes Paes Domingues

23 March 16	Portuguesa	1 – 2	São Caetano	São Paulo
20:00	Tocantins 20'; Renan (yellow card) 33' (yellow-red card) 43'		21' Jô; 85' (o.g.) Luan Peres	Stadium: Canindé; Attendance: 890; Referee: Marcelo Aparecido Ribeiro de Souza

27 March 17	Portuguesa	0 – 2	Rio Branco	São Paulo
16:00			13' Evandro Roncatto; 25' Júlio Capergiani; (yellow card) 77' (yellow-red card) 85' Marcelo	Stadium: Canindé; Attendance: 1,002; Referee: Anderson Faustino Cordeiro

30 March 18	Votuporanguense	0 – 2	Portuguesa	Votuporanga
15:00			68' Tocantins; 89' Bruno Nunes	Stadium: Doutor Plínio Marin; Referee: Rafael Gomes Félix da Silva

3 April 19	Portuguesa	0 – 0	Atlético Sorocaba	São Paulo
10:00	Guilherme Almeida (yellow card) 3'	Report	(yellow card) 44' Claudinei	Stadium: Canindé; Attendance: 965; Referee: Leandro Bizzio Marinho

=== Copa do Brasil ===
==== First round ====
13 April 1st leg	Parnahyba	2 – 1	Portuguesa	Parnaíba
20:30	Idelvando 31'; Ramon 36'; Marcos Gasolina (yellow card) 52'	Report	5' Caio Cezar; (yellow card) 78' Diego Gonçalves	Stadium: Mão Santa; Attendance: 1,904; Referee: Joelson Ferreira

26 April 2nd leg	Portuguesa	1 – 0	Parnahyba	São Paulo
21:30	Guilherme Almeida (yellow card) 4'; Vinicius (yellow card) 11'; Talis (yellow card) 28'; Cesinha (yellow card) 63'; Caio Cezar (yellow card) 71'; Bruno Nunes 85'; Diego Gonçalves (yellow card) 87'	Report	(yellow card) 21' Ramon; (yellow card) 34' Renan; (yellow card) 56' (red card) 59' Luciano; (yellow card) 67' Patrick; (yellow card) 75' Gilmar; (yellow card) 84' Fabiano; (yellow card) 90' Idelvando; (yellow card) 90+2' Cassiano	Stadium: Canindé; Attendance: 338; Referee: João Batista de Arruda

==== Second round ====
11 May 1st leg	Portuguesa	0 – 0	Vitória	São Paulo
21:45	Bruno Mineiro (yellow card) 37'; Caíque (yellow card) 90+1'; Ferdinando (yellow card) 90+3'	Report	(yellow card) 41' Vander; (yellow card) 77' José Welison	Stadium: Canindé; Attendance: 1,131; Referee: Devarly Lira do Rosário

19 May 2nd leg	Vitória	3 – 1	Portuguesa	Salvador
21:30	Diego Renan 42' (pen.); Marcelo 50' (yellow card) 51'; Victor Ramos (yellow card) 67'; Kieza 83'	Report	20' (yellow card) 44' Diego Gonçalves; (yellow card) 65' Cesinha; (yellow card) 74' Bruno Nunes; (yellow card) 76' Marcelo Labarthe	Stadium: Barradão; Attendance: 5,202; Referee: Rodrigo Batista Raposo

=== Campeonato Brasileiro ===
Pos	Team	Pld	W	D	L	GF	GA	GD	Pts	Qualification or relegation
6	Ypiranga de Erechim	18	8	4	6	22	23	−1	28	
7	Mogi Mirim	18	5	7	6	12	15	−3	22	
8	Macaé	18	4	4	10	16	26	−10	16	
9	Portuguesa (R)	18	4	2	12	13	26	−13	14	Relegation to 2017 Campeonato Brasileiro Série D
10	Guaratinguetá (R)	18	1	1	16	13	55	−42	4	Relegation to 2017 Campeonato Brasileiro Série D

Updated to match(es) played on 18 September 2016. Source: Soccerway.com
Rules for classification: 1) points; 2) wins; 3) goal difference; 4) goals scored; 5) head-to-head results; 6) least red cards received; 7) least yellow cards received; 8) draw.
(R) Relegated

==== Matches ====
23 May 1	Portuguesa	1 – 2	Macaé Esporte	São Paulo
15:00	Caio Cezar (yellow card) 13'; Tocantins 25'; Cesinha (yellow card) 47'; Caíque (yellow card) 59'	Report	(yellow card) 52' Matheus Cambuci; 70' Fabio Cambalhota; 77' Magnum	Stadium: Canindé; Attendance: CD; Referee: Luis Teixeira Rocha

29 May 2	Mogi Mirim	0 – 0	Portuguesa	Mogi Mirim
11:00	Alan Mota (yellow card) 56'; Kaio (yellow card) 77'	Report		Stadium: Romildão; Attendance: 373; Referee: Vinicius Furlan

4 June 3	Portuguesa	3 – 1	Ypiranga-RS	São Paulo
16:00	Jessé 21' (o.g.); Felipe Alves 30' (pen.) (yellow card) 80'; Caíque (yellow card) 40'; Caio Cezar 67'	Report	23' Túlio Renan; (yellow card) 28' Gustavo José; (yellow card) 48' Léo; (yellow card) 73' Maycon; (yellow card) 82' Mikael; (yellow card) 90' Negretti	Stadium: Canindé; Attendance: 649; Referee: Sebastião Rufino Ribeiro Filho

12 June 4	Portuguesa	0 – 5	Botafogo-SP	São Paulo
11:00	Felipe Alves (yellow card) 51'; Alê (yellow card) 90+4'	Report	13' 34' Alemão; 54' 87' Diogo Campos; 56' Samuel Santos; (yellow card) 88' Caio Ruan	Stadium: Canindé; Attendance: 1,671; Referee: Leonardo Ferreira Lima

18 June 5	Juventude	1 – 2	Portuguesa	Caxias do Sul
19:00	Fahel 53'; Lucas Santos (yellow card) 72'; Wallacer (yellow card) 90+2'	Report	12' Marcelo; 39' Bruno Oliveira; (yellow card) 87' Bruno Xavier	Stadium: Alfredo Jaconi; Referee: Ronan Marques da Rosa

27 June 6	Portuguesa	0 – 0	Guarani	São Paulo
20:00	Cesinha (yellow card) 57'	Report		Stadium: Canindé; Attendance: 2,504; Referee: Douglas Marques das Flores

3 July 7	Boa Esporte	1 – 0	Portuguesa	Varginha
11:00	Carlos Renato 36'; Daniel (yellow card) 43'; Leonardo (yellow card) 90+3'	Report	(yellow card) 87' Diego Gonçalves	Stadium: Melão; Attendance: 599; Referee: Rodrigo D'Alonso Ferreira

9 July 8	Guaratinguetá	2 – 1	Portuguesa	Limeira
19:00	André Clóvis (yellow card) 35' (goal) 66'; Kauê (yellow card) 70'; Adriano 88'; Wellinton (yellow card) 90+2'	Report	(yellow card) 22' (red card) 86' Augusto; 49' (yellow card) 49' Bruno Xavier; (yellow card) 70' Bruno Mineiro	Stadium: Pradão; Attendance: 66; Referee: Adriano de Assis Miranda

18 July 9	Portuguesa	0 – 2	Tombense	São Paulo
19:15	Vinicius (yellow card) 57'; Mateus (yellow card) 81'	Report	31' (yellow card) 45' (goal) 50' Felipe Alves	Stadium: Canindé; Attendance: 1,267; Referee: Alisson Sidnei Furtado

23 July 10	Macaé Esporte	1 – 0	Portuguesa	Macaé
16:00	Guilherme (yellow card) 38'; Juninho 81' (pen.)	Report	(yellow card) 38' Bruno Oliveira; (yellow card) 80' Marcelo; (yellow card) 81' Nunes; (yellow card) 87' Alê; (yellow card) 90' Douglas Oliveira	Stadium: Moacyrzão; Attendance: 332; Referee: Felipe Duarte Varejão

30 July 11	Portuguesa	1 – 0	Mogi Mirim	São Paulo
19:00	Marcelo (yellow card) 31'; Daniel (yellow card) 31'; Bruno Mineiro 65' (pen.); Alê (yellow card) 90+2'	Report	(yellow card) 42' Diego Torres; (yellow card) 43' (red card) 64' Motta; (yellow card) 73' Murilo Freire	Stadium: Canindé; Attendance: 1,069; Referee: José Claudio Rocha Filho

7 August 12	Ypiranga-RS	1 – 0	Portuguesa	Erechim
11:00	Danilinho (yellow card) 60' (goal) 85'; Sander (yellow card) 90+2'	Report	(yellow card) 44' (red card) 83' Marcelo; (yellow card) 77' Bruno Mineiro; (yellow card) 89' Bruno Xavier	Stadium: Colosso da Lagoa; Referee: Eduardo Tomaz de Aquino Valdão

15 August 13	Botafogo-SP	2 – 1	Portuguesa	Ribeirão Preto
19:15	Tiago Marques 14'; Zotti 43'; Filipe (yellow card) 74'; Diego Cristiano (yellow card) 75'; Rodrigo Thiesen (yellow card) 80'	Report	48' Denner; (yellow card) 54' Douglas Oliveira; (yellow card) 74' Nunes; (yellow card) 81' Mateus	Stadium: Santa Cruz; Attendance: 2,524; Referee: Leandro Bizzio Marinho

20 August 14	Portuguesa	1 – 2	Juventude	São Paulo
15:00	Denner 19' (yellow card) 45'; Nunes (yellow card) 28'; Bruno Mineiro (yellow card) 48'; Leonardo (yellow card) 83'	Report	(yellow card) 28' Anderson Marques; (yellow card) 34' Vacaria; (yellow card) 63' Negrete; 74' Caion; 90' Caprini	Stadium: Canindé; Attendance: 695; Referee: Elmo Alves Resende Cunha

28 August 15	Guarani	1 – 0	Portuguesa	Campinas
19:30	Fumagalli 50' (yellow card) 89'; Renato (yellow card) 59'	Report	(yellow card) 1' João Henrique; (yellow card) 38' Michel Pires; (yellow card) 40' Cesinha; (yellow card) 89' Renato Kayzer; (yellow card) 90' (red card) 90' Denner	Stadium: Brinco de Ouro da Princesa; Attendance: 7,219; Referee: Thiago Duarte Peixoto

4 September 16	Portuguesa	0 – 2	Boa Esporte	São Paulo
11:00	Ronaldo (yellow card) 42'; Mateus (yellow card) 85'	Report	(yellow card) 36' Bruno Maia; 75' Daniel Cruz; 87' (pen.) Tchô	Stadium: Canindé; Attendance: 1,229; Referee: Eduardo Tomaz de Aquino Valadão

11 September 17	Portuguesa	3 – 1	Guaratinguetá	Osasco
19:30	Marcelo 20'; João Henrique (yellow card) 26'; Bruno Xavier 52'; Ronaldo (yellow card) 68'; Denner (yellow card) 79'; Bruno Mineiro 85' (pen.)	Report	(yellow card) 15' Kauê Martins; (red card) 18' Samuel; 42' Anderson; (yellow card) 84' Adriano	Stadium: José Liberatti; Referee: Alinor Silva da Paixão

18 September 18	Tombense	2 – 0	Portuguesa	Tombos
16:00	Alex (yellow card) 23' (goal) 29'; Ewerton Maradona (yellow card) 48'; Bileu 70'; Fernandinho (yellow card) 87'	Report	(yellow card) 47' Alê; (yellow card) 48' Caíque; (yellow card) 80' Douglas Oliveira; (yellow card) 85' Cesinha	Stadium: Almeidão; Attendance: 943; Referee: Ítalo Medeiros de Azevedo
