= Digao =

Digao may refer to:

- Zhuanxu, also known as Digao (i.e., Emperor Gao), legendary Chinese ruler
- Emperor Gaozu of Han, or Digao (died 195 BC), a historical Chinese emperor of the early Han dynasty
- Liu Zhiyuan, or Digao (895–948), historical Chinese emperor of the Later Han dynasty
- Digão (footballer, born 1985), full name Rodrigo Manuel Izecson dos Santos Leite, Brazilian footballer, brother of Kaká
- Digão (footballer, born 1986), full name Rodrigo Candido Andrade, Brazilian football left-back
- Digão (footballer, born 1988), full name Rodrigo Junior Paula Silva, Brazilian footballer
- Digão (footballer, born 1993), full name Rodrigo Longo Freitas, Brazilian footballer
