= Renato Kayzer =

Brazilian footballer

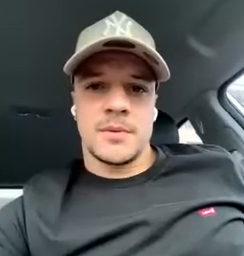
- Kayzer in 2022

Personal information
- Full name: Renato Kayzer de Souza
- Date of birth: 17 February 1996 (age 30)
- Place of birth: Tupãssi, Brazil
- Height: 1.78 m (5 ft 10 in)
- Position: Forward

Team information
- Current team: Vitória
- Number: 79

Youth career
- 2008–2010: Santos
- 2011–2012: Desportivo Brasil
- 2013: → Vasco da Gama (loan)
- 2014–2015: Vasco da Gama

Senior career*
Years	Team	Apps	(Gls)
2015–2018	Vasco da Gama	2	(0)
2016	→ Oeste (loan)	5	(0)
2016	→ Portuguesa (loan)	5	(0)
2017	→ Villa Nova (loan)	9	(0)
2017	→ Ferroviária (loan)	0	(0)
2018	→ Tupi (loan)	11	(5)
2018–2020	Cruzeiro	6	(0)
2018	→ Atlético Goianiense (loan)	33	(7)
2019	→ Ponte Preta (loan)	2	(0)
2019	→ Chapecoense (loan)	14	(1)
2020	→ Atlético Goianiense (loan)	12	(8)
2020–2022	Athletico Paranaense	58	(14)
2022–2025	Fortaleza	40	(5)
2022	→ Daejeon Hana Citizen (loan)	13	(4)
2023	→ América Mineiro (loan)	3	(0)
2024	→ Criciúma (loan)	17	(5)
2025–	Vitória	42	(14)
- * Club domestic league appearances and goals as of 8 April 2026

Renato Kayzer de Souza (born 17 February 1996), known as Renato Kayzer, is a Brazilian footballer who plays as a forward for Vitória.

== Club career ==
=== Vasco da Gama ===
Born in Jotaesse, Tupãssi, Paraná, Kayzer moved to São Vicente, São Paulo at early age and started his career with Santos' youth setup. He subsequently represented Desportivo Brasil and Vasco da Gama, finishing his formation with the latter in 2015.

Kayzer made his first team – and Série A – debut for Vasco on 16 September 2015, coming on as a second-half substitute for Serginho in a 2–2 away draw against Cruzeiro. He only appeared in two further matches during the campaign, both as a substitute.

On 26 February 2016, Kayzer was loaned to Oeste until the end of the year. On 24 May, after featuring rarely, he moved to Série C side Portuguesa also in a temporary deal, but again featured sparingly.

Kayzer subsequently represented Villa Nova, Ferroviária and Tupi on loan, impressing with the latter in the 2018 Campeonato Mineiro.

=== Cruzeiro ===
On 9 April 2018, Kayzer signed for Cruzeiro and was immediately loaned to Atlético Goianiense in the Série B. He was a regular starter for the side, scoring seven goals and narrowly missing out promotion.

Kayzer returned to Raposa for the 2019 season; initially assigned to the first team, he was rarely used and subsequently moved out on loan to Ponte Preta. A subsequent loan move to Chapecoense followed, where he featured sparingly as the club suffered relegation.

On 29 December 2019, Kayzer returned to Atlético Goianiense, also on loan, with the side now in the top tier.

=== Athletico Paranaense ===
On 25 September 2020, Kayzer joined Athletico Paranaense on a permanent three-year deal after a long series of loan spells. He scored a career-best 11 goals in the 2020 Série A (including three goals with Atlético Goianiense), and added a further six in the following tournament.

=== Fortaleza ===
On 8 February 2022, Kayzer signed for Fortaleza on a permanent deal. After being rarely used, he joined Daejeon Hana Citizen in South Korea on a six-month loan deal on 17 July.

Kayzed suffered an Achilles tendon rupture in October 2022, which kept him sidelined for 11 months. He moved to América Mineiro on loan on 2 August 2023, but only played in three matches as the club suffered relegation.

On 4 January 2024, Kayzer was announced as an addition of newly-promoted side Criciúma on a one-year loan deal. He was a regular starter as the club won the year's Campeonato Catarinense, and scored the first goal of the 2024 Série A before being recalled by Fortaleza on 13 April.

== Career statistics ==
As of 18 December 2024

Club	Season	League			State League		Cup		Continental		Other		Total	
Club	Season	Division	Apps	Goals	Apps	Goals	Apps	Goals	Apps	Goals	Apps	Goals	Apps	Goals
Vasco da Gama	2015	Série A	2	0	0	0	1	0	—		—		3	0
Oeste (loan)	2016	Série B	0	0	5	0	0	0	—		—		5	0
Portuguesa (loan)	2016	Série C	5	0	—		—		—		—		5	0
Villa Nova (loan)	2017	Série D	0	0	9	0	—		—		—		9	0
Ferroviária (loan)	2017	Paulista	—		0	0	—		—		20 (Note: Appearance(s) in Copa Paulista)	3	20	3
Tupi (loan)	2018	Série C	0	0	11	5	—		—		—		11	5
Atlético Goianiense (loan)	2018	Série B	33	7	—		—		—		—		33	7
Cruzeiro	2019	Série A	0	0	6	0	0	0	0	0	—		6	0
Ponte Preta (loan)	2019	Série B	2	0	—		—		—		—		2	0
Chapecoense (loan)	2019	Série A	14	1	—		—		—		—		14	1
Atlético Goianiense (loan)	2020	Série A	5	3	7	5	4	2	—		—		16	10
Athletico Paranaense	2020	Série A	27	8	—		—		2 (Note: Appearance(s) in Copa Libertadores)	0	—		29	8
Athletico Paranaense	2021	Série A	28	6	3	0	10	4	12 (Note: Appearance(s) in Copa Sudamericana)	2	—		53	12
Athletico Paranaense	Total		55	14	3	0	10	4	14	2	—		82	19
Fortaleza	2022	Série A	6	0	6	0	1	0	5	1	5 (Note: Appearance(s) in Copa do Nordeste)	2	23	3
Fortaleza	2023	Série A	0	0	0	0	0	0	0	0	—		0	0
Fortaleza	2024	Série A	28	5	—		—		5	0	—		33	5
Fortaleza	Total		34	5	6	0	1	0	10	1	5	2	56	8
Daejeon Hana Citizen (loan)	2022	K League 2	13	4	—		—		—		0	0	13	4
América Mineiro (loan)	2023	Série A	3	0	—		—		—		—		3	0
Criciúma (loan)	2024	Série A	1	1	16	4	2	0	—		1 (Note: Appearance(s) in Recopa Catarinense)	0	20	5
Career total			167	35	63	14	18	6	24	3	26	5	298	63

== Honours ==
Ferroviária

- Copa Paulista: 2017

Cruzeiro

- Campeonato Mineiro: 2019

Atlético Goianiense

- Campeonato Goiano: 2020

Athletico Paranaense

- Copa Sudamericana: 2021

Fortaleza

- Copa do Nordeste: 2022
- Campeonato Cearense: 2022

Criciúma

- Recopa Catarinense: 2024
- Campeonato Catarinense: 2024
