= Pegorari =

Brazilian footballer

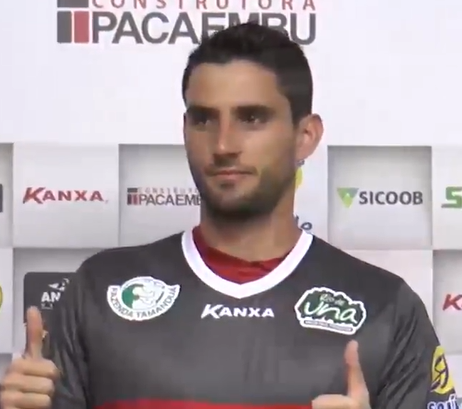
- Pegorari in 2018

Personal information
- Full name: José Guilherme Guidolin Pegorari
- Date of birth: 12 July 1991 (age 35)
- Place of birth: Americana, Brazil
- Height: 1.91 m (6 ft 3 in)
- Position: Goalkeeper

Team information
- Current team: Guarani
- Number: 1

Youth career
- Rio Branco-SP
- 2007–2011: Palmeiras

Senior career*
Years	Team	Apps	(Gls)
2012–2015	Palmeiras B	16	(0)
2012	→ Oeste (loan)	0	(0)
2013	→ Bragantino (loan)	0	(0)
2014	→ Bragantino (loan)	0	(0)
2014–2015	→ Guarani (loan)	0	(0)
2015–2016	Guarani	24	(0)
2016	Portuguesa	11	(0)
2017–2018	Linense	5	(0)
2018	Botafogo-SP	0	(1)
2019–2022	Ituano	122	(0)
2019	→ Figueirense (loan)	12	(0)
2022–2023	Juventude	19	(0)
2023–	Guarani	0	(0)
- * Club domestic league appearances and goals as of 03:41, 10 August 2022 (UTC)

José Guilherme Guidolin Pegorari (born 12 July 1991), commonly known as Pegorari, is a Brazilian footballer who plays as a goalkeeper for Guarani.

== Club career ==
Born in Americana, São Paulo, Pegorari joined Palmeiras' youth setup in 2007, from hometown side Rio Branco-SP. On 22 May 2012, he was loaned to Oeste for the remainder of the Série C.

On 7 January 2013, Pegorari moved on loan to Bragantino until the end of the 2013 Campeonato Paulista. On 17 December, he returned to the club, also on loan.

In May 2014, Pegorari was loaned to Guarani until the end of the year. On 9 May 2015, shortly after his loan expired, he signed a permanent deal with the club.

Pegorari was a regular starter for Bugre during the 2016 Campeonato Paulista Série A2, and moved to third division side Portuguesa on 31 May of that year. On 10 November, after the latter's relegation, he signed for Linense.

On 18 May 2018, Pegorari agreed to a deal with Botafogo-SP, but was only a backup option. He signed a contract with Ituano on 6 November, and immediately became a regular starter for his new club.

On 15 August 2019, Pegorari renewed with Ituano until December 2020, and was loaned to Série B side Figueirense for the remainder of the year. Upon returning to his parent club, he was again a first-choice, and further extended his contract until 2023 on 5 August 2020.

On 4 August 2022, Pegorari signed a deal with Série A side Juventude until December 2023. He made his debut in the top tier two days later at the age of 31, starting in a 1–0 home loss against América Mineiro.

== Career statistics ==
As of 9 August 2022

Club	Season	League			State League		Cup		Continental		Other		Total	
Club	Season	Division	Apps	Goals	Apps	Goals	Apps	Goals	Apps	Goals	Apps	Goals	Apps	Goals
Palmeiras B	2012	Paulista A2	—		16	0	—		—		—		16	0
Oeste	2012	Série C	0	0	—		—		—		—		0	0
Bragantino	2013	Série B	0	0	0	0	0	0	—		—		0	0
Bragantino	2014	Série B	0	0	0	0	0	0	—		—		0	0
Bragantino	Subtotal		0	0	0	0	0	0	—		—		0	0
Guarani	2014	Série C	0	0	—		—		—		—		0	0
Guarani	2015	Série C	5	0	0	0	—		—		—		5	0
Guarani	2016	Série C	0	0	19	0	—		—		—		19	0
Guarani	Subtotal		5	0	19	0	—		—		—		24	0
Portuguesa	2016	Série C	11	0	—		—		—		—		11	0
Linense	2017	Paulista	—		0	0	—		—		14 (Note: Appearance(s) in Copa Paulista)	0	14	0
Linense	2018	Série D	0	0	5	0	—		—		—		5	0
Linense	Subtotal		0	0	5	0	—		—		14	0	19	0
Botafogo-SP	2018	Série C	0	0	—		—		—		—		0	0
Ituano	2019	Série D	14	0	14	0	—		—		—		28	0
Ituano	2020	Série C	20	0	12	0	—		—		—		32	0
Ituano	2021	Série C	22	0	8	0	—		—		—		30	0
Ituano	2022	Série B	18	0	14	0	—		—		—		32	0
Ituano	Subtotal		74	0	48	0	—		—		—		122	0
Figueirense (loan)	2019	Série B	12	0	—		—		—		—		12	0
Juventude	2022	Série A	1	0	—		—		—		—		1	0
Career total			103	0	88	0	0	0	0	0	14	0	205	0

== Honours ==
Ituano

- Campeonato Brasileiro Série C: 2021
