= Raphael Alemão =

Brazilian footballer (born 1988)

Personal information
- Full name: Raphael Emílio da Silva
- Date of birth: 17 August 1988 (age 38)
- Place of birth: Piracicaba, Brazil
- Height: 1.97 m (6 ft 6 in)
- Position: Goalkeeper

Youth career
- Rio Branco-SP
- 2005–2007: Palmeiras

Senior career*
Years	Team	Apps	(Gls)
2007–2013	Palmeiras B	43	(0)
2008	→ América-RN (loan)	0	(0)
2008	→ Guaratinguetá (loan)	0	(0)
2010	→ Rio Claro (loan)	0	(0)
2010–2017	Palmeiras	2	(0)
2014	→ Marília (loan)	2	(0)
2014	→ Náutico (loan)	0	(0)
2015	→ Caldense (loan)	0	(0)
2016	→ Atlético Sorocaba (loan)	16	(0)
2016	→ Portuguesa (loan)	0	(0)
2017	→ Cianorte (loan)	0	(0)
2018	CA Rondoniense		
- * Club domestic league appearances and goals as of 18 June 2016

Raphael Emílio da Silva (born 17 August 1988), known as Raphael Alemão, is a Brazilian footballer who plays as a goalkeeper.

== Honours ==
Palmeiras

- Copa do Brasil: 2012
- Campeonato Brasileiro Série B: 2013
