= Luan Peres =

Brazilian footballer

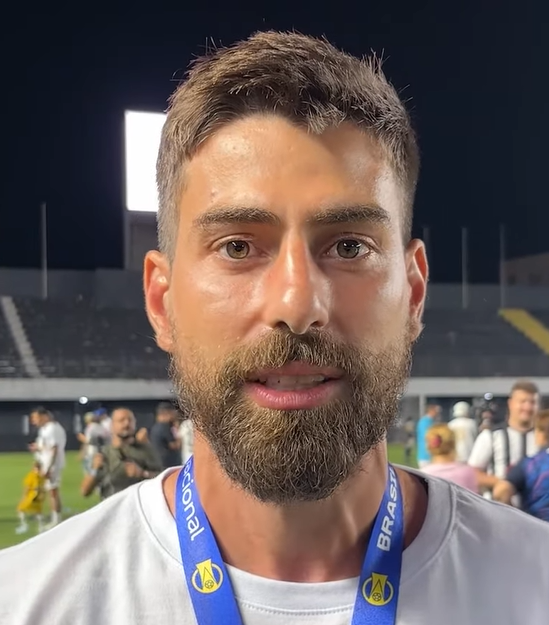
- Luan Peres in 2024

Personal information
- Full name: Luan Peres Petroni
- Date of birth: 19 July 1994 (age 32)
- Place of birth: São Paulo, Brazil
- Height: 1.90 m (6 ft 3 in)
- Positions: Centre-back; left-back

Team information
- Current team: Santos
- Number: 14

Youth career
- 2002–2014: Portuguesa

Senior career*
Years	Team	Apps	(Gls)
2014–2016	Portuguesa	31	(2)
2016	Santa Cruz	14	(0)
2017	Red Bull Brasil	13	(0)
2017–2018	Ituano	0	(0)
2017–2018	→ Ponte Preta (loan)	31	(0)
2018	→ Fluminense (loan)	9	(0)
2018–2021	Club Brugge	4	(0)
2019–2021	→ Santos (loan)	48	(0)
2021	Santos	17	(0)
2021–2022	Marseille	34	(0)
2022–2024	Fenerbahçe	11	(1)
2024–	Santos	74	(2)
- * Club domestic league appearances and goals as of 17:26, 19 November 2026 (UTC)

Luan Peres Petroni (Brazilian Portuguese: [luˈɐ̃n ˈpɛɾes]) (born 19 July 1994), is a Brazilian professional footballer who plays for Série A club Santos. Mainly a centre-back, he can also play as a left-back.

== Career ==
=== Portuguesa ===
Born in São Paulo, Luan Peres began his career on Portuguesa, being promoted to the main squad in July 2013, as a backup to Rogério. He alternated between the first-team and the under-20s in the following years, being named on the bench for the club's last matches of 2014 Série B, but remaining an unused substitute as his side suffered relegation.

After being included in the 28-man list for the 2015 Campeonato Paulista, Luan Peres made his professional debut on 8 April, starting in a 3–0 away loss against São Paulo. On 24 August, after becoming a regular starter during the club's Série C campaign, he signed a new contract until July 2018.

Luan Peres scored his first senior goal on 16 February 2016, in a 2–1 Campeonato Paulista Série A2 home defeat of Velo Clube. In June, he rescinded his contract with Lusa, after having unpaid wages.

=== Santa Cruz / Red Bull Brasil ===
On 21 June 2016, Luan Peres signed a short-term deal with Série A club Santa Cruz. He made his debut in the top tier on 31 July, starting in a 3–0 loss at Atlético Mineiro.

Luan Peres contributed with 14 appearances (13 starts), as Santa suffered relegation. Ahead of the 2017 Campeonato Paulista, he signed for Red Bull Brasil, being a regular starter as his club narrowly avoided relegation.

=== Ponte Preta ===
On 10 May 2017, Luan Peres was announced at Ituano, but joined Ponte Preta on loan until December just two days later. Initially a backup to Marllon and Rodrigo, he remained at the club in the following year and subsequently became a first-choice.

=== Fluminense ===
On 20 April 2018, Luan Peres agreed to a one-year loan deal at Fluminense. He immediately became a starter under manager Abel Braga, but rescinded his contract with the club on 20 June after accepting an offer from a Belgian club.

=== Club Brugge ===
On 1 July 2018, he moved abroad for the first time in his career, Belgian First Division A side Club Brugge reached and agreement with Ituano for the transfer of Luan Peres, who signed a four-year contract with the club. He made his debut abroad on 5 August, replacing Jelle Vossen in a 1–0 away defeat of Royal Excel Mouscron.

Luan Peres made his UEFA Champions League debut on 11 December 2018, replacing Cyril Ngonge in a 0–0 home draw against Atlético Madrid.

=== Santos ===
On 3 August 2019, Luan Peres returned to his home country after agreeing to a loan deal with Santos, until December 2020. He made his debut for the club on 14 September, starting in a 1–0 away loss against Flamengo.

Initially a backup to Gustavo Henrique and Lucas Veríssimo, Luan Peres became a regular starter after the former moved to Flamengo. On 29 December 2020, his loan was extended until the end of the 2020 Copa Libertadores; the extension also added an obligatory buyout clause if his team reach the Final of the competition.

Luan Peres' permanent four-year contract with Peixe was registered on 12 February 2021.

=== Marseille ===
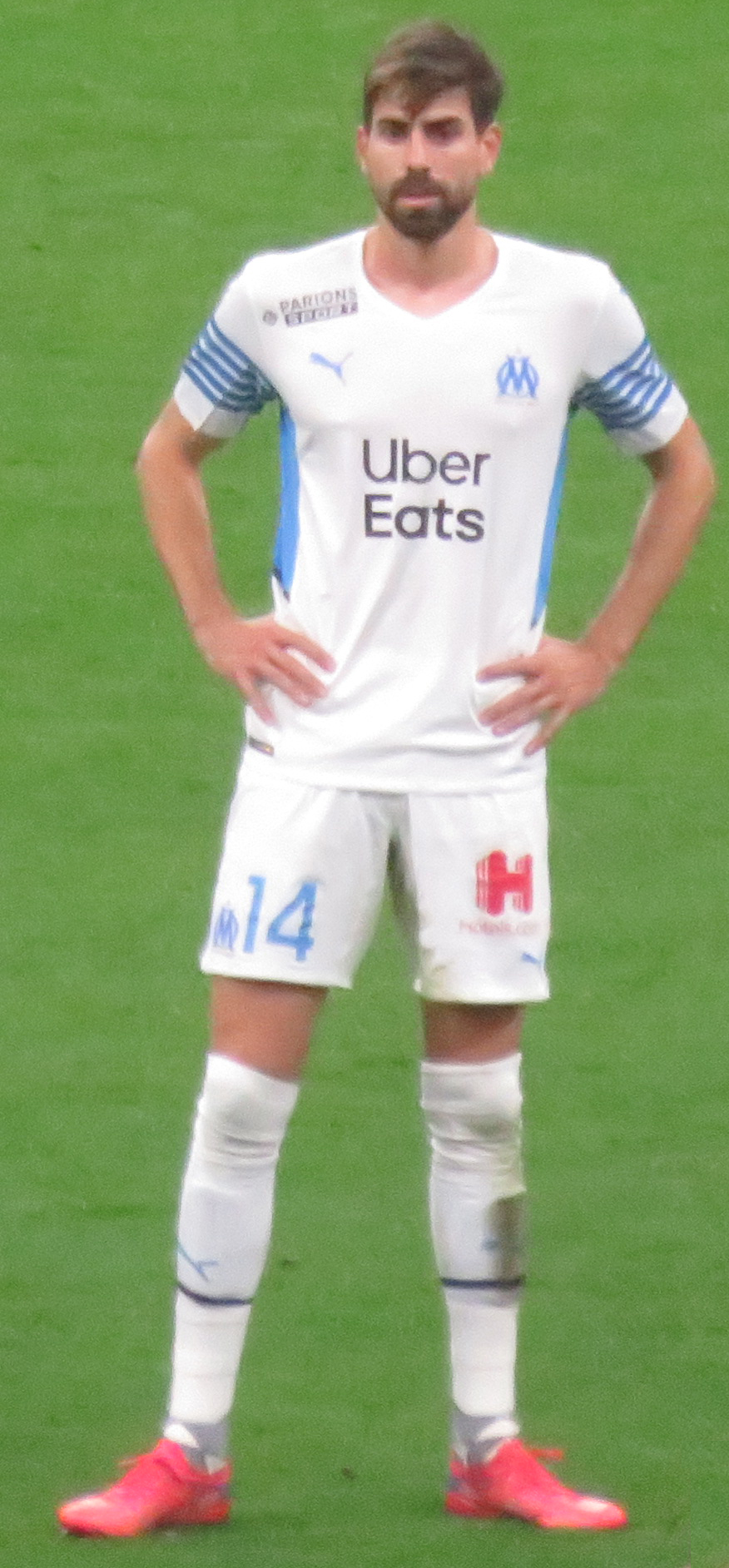
Luan Peres with Marseille in 2021

On 14 July 2021, Luan Peres signed a four-year deal with French Ligue 1 side Marseille. He played 43 games during the season, where he was on the pitch 69,11% percent overall.

=== Fenerbahçe ===
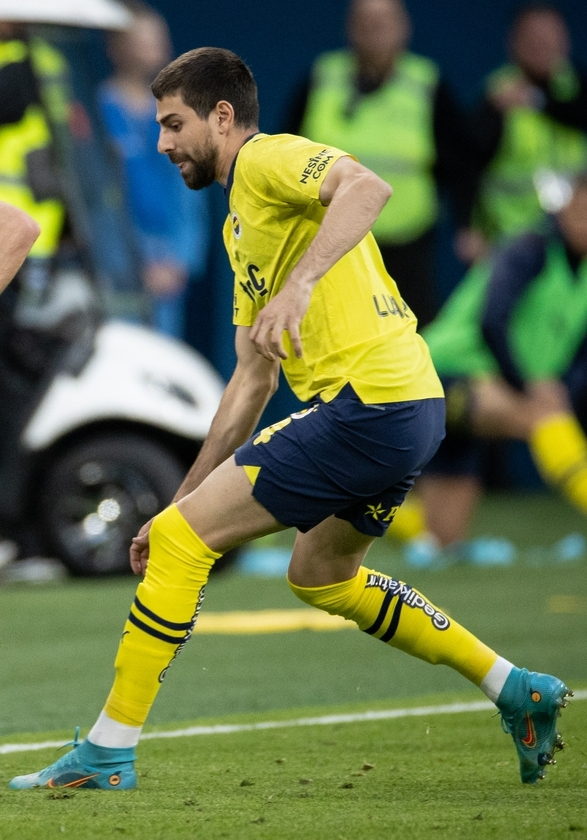
Luan Peres playing for Fenerbahçe in 2023

On 29 July 2022, Luan Peres signed for Süper Lig club Fenerbahçe on a three-year contract. He made his debut in a Süper Lig match, 3–3 tie against Ümraniyespor on 8 August 2022.

On 15 September 2022, Luan Peres had a serious knee injury in the UEFA Europa League, group match against Stade Rennais. After four months therapy without operation, he played in a late substitute for Turkish Cup match, 2–1 win over Çaykur Rizespor on 19 January 2023 and late substitute again for Süper Lig match, 5–1 win over Kasımpaşa on 29 January 2023.

In February 2023, Luan Peres again injured his left knee and was out of football for several months. On 29 April 2023, he played first time after seven months in starter eleven and played 90 minutes, in away 3–1 win over Sivasspor. After recovering from his long lasting two consecutive knee injuries, he returned to the starting eleven and became one of the key players who took more responsibility on the field, before suffering another injury in August which sidelined him for the entire season.

=== Santos return ===
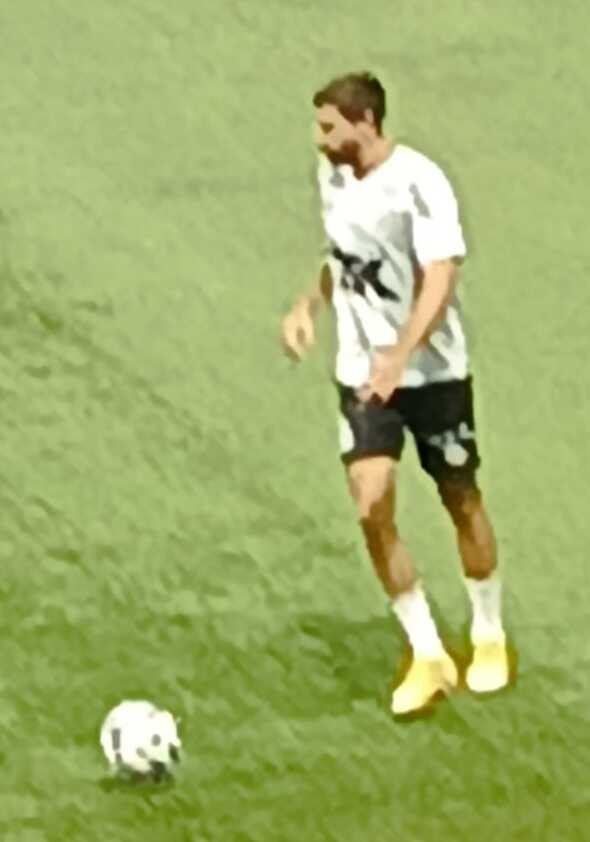
Luan Peres warming up with Santos in 2025

On 3 September 2024, Santos announced the return of Luan Peres on a contract until December 2027. He made his first appearance in more than a year twelve days later, replacing Gonzalo Escobar late into a 2–1 home win over América Mineiro.

Luan Peres scored his first goal for the club on 16 August 2026, netting the third in a 3–0 away win over Vasco da Gama.

== Career statistics ==
As of 19 November 2026

Appearances and goals by club, season and competition
Club	Season	League			State League		Cup (Note: Includes Copa do Brasil, Belgian Cup, Coupe de France and Turkish Cup)		Continental		Other		Total	
Club	Season	Division	Apps	Goals	Apps	Goals	Apps	Goals	Apps	Goals	Apps	Goals	Apps	Goals
Portuguesa	2014	Série B	0	0	0	0	0	0	—		—		0	0
Portuguesa	2015	Série C	15	0	1	0	2	0	—		—		18	0
Portuguesa	2016	Série C	0	0	15	2	1	0	—		—		16	2
Portuguesa	Total		15	0	16	2	3	0	0	0	0	0	34	2
Santa Cruz	2016	Série A	14	0	—		—		2 (Note: Appearance(s) in Copa Sudamericana)	0	—		16	0
Red Bull Brasil	2017	Série D	0	0	13	0	—		—		—		13	0
Ponte Preta	2017	Série A	16	0	—		—		2	0	—		18	0
Ponte Preta	2018	Série B	0	0	15	0	4	0	—		—		19	0
Ponte Preta	Total		16	0	15	0	4	0	2	0	0	0	37	0
Fluminense	2018	Série A	9	0	—		—		0	0	—		9	0
Club Brugge	2018–19	First Division A	4	0	—		1	0	1 (Note: Appearance(s) in UEFA Champions League)	0	0	0	6	0
Club Brugge	2019–20	First Division A	0	0	—		0	0	0	0	—		0	0
Club Brugge	Total		4	0	0	0	1	0	1	0	0	0	6	0
Santos	2019	Série A	9	0	—		—		—		—		9	0
Santos	2020	Série A	29	0	13	0	2	0	11 (Note: Appearance(s) in Copa Libertadores)	0	—		55	0
Santos	2021	Série A	7	0	7	0	2	0	10	0	—		26	0
Santos	Total		45	0	20	0	4	0	21	0	0	0	90	0
Marseille	2021–22	Ligue 1	34	0	—		3	0	13 (Note: Six appearances in the UEFA Europa League, seven appearances in the UEFA Conference League)	0	—		50	0
Fenerbahçe	2022–23	Süper Lig	11	1	—		4	0	5 (Note: Appearances in UEFA Europa League)	0	—		20	1
Fenerbahçe	2023–24	Süper Lig	0	0	—		0	0	3 (Note: Appearances in UEFA Conference League)	0	—		3	0
Fenerbahçe	Total		11	1	0	0	4	0	8	0	0	0	23	1
Santos	2024	Série B	5	0	—		—		—		—		5	0
Santos	2025	Série A	24	0	11	0	1	0	—		—		36	0
Santos	2026	Série A	29	2	5	0	3	0	9	0	—		46	2
Santos	Total		58	2	16	0	4	0	9	0	—		87	2
Career total			205	3	80	2	23	0	56	0	0	0	365	5

== Honours ==
Club Brugge

- Belgian Super Cup: 2018

Fenerbahçe

- Turkish Cup: 2022–23

Santos

- Campeonato Brasileiro Série B: 2024
