= Denner (footballer, born 1993) =

Brazilian footballer

Personal information
- Full name: Denner Paulino Barbosa
- Date of birth: 21 November 1993 (age 32)
- Place of birth: Guarulhos, Brazil
- Height: 1.80 m (5 ft 11 in)
- Position: Left back

Team information
- Current team: São Bento

Youth career
- 2009–2012: Corinthians

Senior career*
Years	Team	Apps	(Gls)
2012–2013	Corinthians	3	(0)
2013	→ Atlético Goianiense (loan)	2	(0)
2014–2015	Bragantino	8	(0)
2014	→ Boa Esporte (loan)	1	(0)
2015	→ Penapolense (loan)	2	(0)
2015	Red Bull Brasil	0	(0)
2016	FC Cascavel	10	(0)
2016	Portuguesa	6	(2)
2017	São Bento	4	(0)
2017–2018	Famalicão	7	(0)
2019	Rio Claro	3	(0)
2019	Nacional SP	0	(0)
2020	Juventus-SC	11	(1)
2020–	São Bento	6	(0)
- * Club domestic league appearances and goals as of 21:55, 5 October 2020 (UTC)

Denner Paulino Barbosa (born November 21, 1993), simply known as Denner, is a Brazilian footballer who plays as a left back for São Bento.

== Career ==
Born in Guarulhos, Denner began his career in the youth of the Corinthians. With good performances in the Copa São Paulo de Futebol Júnior in 2011, the left back was called by the technical committee to gain experience in professional cast of Corinthians. Recently, Denner was called up to join the Brazil U-17 on the left side. He joined the cast of the Brazil U-17 victory in 2011. In 2012, the left back part of the team eight times champion Copa São Paulo de Futebol Júnior.

== Statistics ==
Club performance
Club	Season	Brasileirão Série A		Brasileirão Série B		Copa do Brasil		Libertadores		Copa Sudamericana		State League		Friendly		Total	
Club	Season	App	Goals	App	Goals	App	Goals	App	Goals	App	Goals	App	Goals	App	Goals	App	Goals
Corinthians	2011	0	0	0	0	0	0	0	0	0	0	0	0	1	0	1	0
Corinthians	2012	3	0	0	0	0	0	0	0	0	0	1	0	0	0	4	0
Atlético-GO	2013	0	0	2	0	0	0	0	0	0	0	0	0	0	0	2	0
Total		3	0	2	0	0	0	0	0	0	0	1	0	1	0	7	0

== Honours ==
Corinthians Paulista

- Copa São Paulo de Futebol Júnior: 2012
- Campeonato Brasileiro Série A: 2011
