= Valdeci =

Brazilian footballer

Personal information
- Full name: Valdeci Moreira da Silva
- Date of birth: 26 March 1995 (age 31)
- Place of birth: Fortaleza, Brazil
- Height: 1.78 m (5 ft 10 in)
- Position: Attacking midfielder

Youth career
- 2013: Ferroviário

Senior career*
Years	Team	Apps	(Gls)
2014–2022	Ferroviário	58	(15)
2015	→ Alto Santo (loan)	2	(0)
2016	→ Portuguesa (loan)	2	(0)
2017	→ Horizonte (loan)	0	(0)
2019	→ Resende (loan)	8	(1)
2019–2020	→ Sportivo Luqueño (loan)	31	(6)
2021	→ Coritiba (loan)	16	(0)
2022	Rubio Ñu		
2022–2025	Tacuary	52	(2)
2025	Linense	13	(2)
2025	Itabaiana	4	(0)
2025–2026	Arema	26	(5)
- * Club domestic league appearances and goals as of 22 May 2026

Valdeci Moreira da Silva (born 26 March 1995), simply known as Valdeci, is a Brazilian footballer. Mainly an attacking midfielder, he can also play as a right winger.

== Career statistics ==
As of 6 February 2022

Club	Season	League			State League		Cup		Continental		Other		Total	
Club	Season	Division	Apps	Goals	Apps	Goals	Apps	Goals	Apps	Goals	Apps	Goals	Apps	Goals
Ferroviário	2014	Cearense	—		0	0	—		—		7 (Note: Appearance(s) in Copa Fares Lopes)	0	7	0
Ferroviário	2015	Cearense Série B	—		3	0	—		—		—		3	0
Ferroviário	2016	Cearense Série B	—		19	10	—		—		—		19	10
Ferroviário	2017	Cearense	—		14	2	—		—		—		14	2
Ferroviário	2018	Série D	8	1	12	2	6	1	—		8	0	34	4
Ferroviário	2019	Série C	1	0	1	0	—		—		—		2	0
Ferroviário	Total		9	1	49	14	6	1	—		15	0	77	16
Alto Santo (loan)	2015	Cearense Série C	—		2	0	—		—		5	1	7	1
Portuguesa (loan)	2016	Série C	2	0	—		—		—		—		2	0
Horizonte (loan)	2017	Cearense Série C	—		—		—		—		6	0	6	0
Resende (loan)	2019	Carioca	—		8	1	—		—		—		8	1
Sportivo Luqueño (loan)	2019	Primera División	9	3	—		—		—		—		9	3
Sportivo Luqueño (loan)	2020	Primera División	22	3	—		—		2 (Note: Appearance(s) in Copa Sudamericana)	0	—		24	3
Sportivo Luqueño (loan)	Total		31	6	—		—		2	0	—		33	6
Coritiba (loan)	2021	Série B	10	0	6	0	3	0	—		—		19	0
Career total			52	7	65	15	9	1	2	0	26	1	154	24

== Honours ==
Alto Santo

- Campeonato Cearense Série C: 2015

Ferroviário

- Copa Fares Lopes: 2018
- Campeonato Brasileiro Série D: 2018
