= Jones Carioca =

Brazilian footballer

Personal information
- Full name: Jones da Silva Lopes
- Date of birth: 14 October 1988 (age 38)
- Place of birth: Caratinga, Brazil
- Height: 1.77 m (5 ft 10 in)
- Position: Forward

Youth career
- Bonsucesso

Senior career*
Years	Team	Apps	(Gls)
2007–2010	Bonsucesso	?	(?)
2009	→ Noroeste (loan)	?	(?)
2010–2013	Deportivo Maldonado	0	(0)
2010	→ America-RJ (loan)	0	(0)
2010	→ Cruzeiro (loan)	1	(0)
2010	→ Goiás (loan)	7	(2)
2011–2012	→ Bahia (loan)	38	(3)
2013	→ Náutico (loan)	16	(0)
2014	Karabükspor	14	(0)
2014	Giresunspor	9	(1)
2016	ABC	20	(12)
2017–2018	Giresunspor	31	(1)
2018–2019	Avaí	11	(0)
- * Club domestic league appearances and goals as of 1 May 2019

Jones Lopes da Silva (born 14 October 1988), known as Jones Carioca, is a Brazilian professional footballer. Mainly a forward, he can also play as a winger or as an attacking midfielder.

== Career ==
Born in Caratinga, Jones began his career in Bonsucesso team in 2009. Had a pass on loan, almost unnoticed by Northwest five months of Bauru. In January 2010 he was signed by Deportivo Maldonado, which de facto a proxy club for investor and football agent. Then he was hired even loaned by America-Rio de Janeiro state championship for football in 2010. He stood out and was one of the best players in the league in Rio. In August 2010 he was loaned to Cruzeiro, for which Cruzeiro would receive a 30% transfer fee if Jones was successfully sold, followed the footstep of Wallyson.

== Career statistics ==
Appearances and goals by club, season and competition
Club	Season	Série A		State League		Copa do Brasil		Copa Sudamericana		Total	
Club	Season	Apps	Goals	Apps	Goals	Apps	Goals	Apps	Goals	Apps	Goals
America (loan)	2010	–		15	3	–		–		15	3
Cruzeiro (loan)	2010	1	0	–		–		–		1	0
Goiás (loan)	2010	7	2	–		–		–		7	2
Total		8	2	15	3	0	0	0	0	23	5

== Honours ==
Bahia

- Campeonato Baiano: 2012

ABC

- Campeonato Potiguar: 2016
- Copa RN: 2016

Avaí

- Campeonato Catarinense: 2019

Individual

- Campeonato Brasileiro Série C top scorer: 2016 (12 goals)
