= Moacir (footballer, born 1989) =

Brazilian footballer

Personal information
- Full name: Moacir Alves de Andrade Junior
- Date of birth: 3 January 1989 (age 37)
- Place of birth: Mairinque, Brazil
- Height: 1.70 m (5 ft 7 in)
- Position: Attacking midfielder

Senior career*
Years	Team	Apps	(Gls)
2007–2013	Desportivo Brasil		
2007	→ São Bento (loan)		
2008	→ Ituano (loan)		
2008	→ Palmeiras B (loan)		
2009	→ Ituano (loan)	14	(1)
2009–2010	→ Estoril (loan)	23	(2)
2010	→ Ponte Preta (loan)	22	(2)
2011	→ Botafogo-SP (loan)	8	(1)
2011	→ Americana (loan)	9	(0)
2011	→ Gazovik Orenburg (loan)	8	(1)
2012	→ Atlético Sorocaba (loan)	14	(1)
2012	→ Oeste (loan)	2	(0)
2013	Guaratinguetá	26	(0)
2014	Mogi Mirim	0	(0)
2014	Guaratinguetá	2	(0)
2015	São Caetano	0	(0)
2015	Campinense	0	(0)
2016	Portuguesa	1	(0)
- * Club domestic league appearances and goals as of 29 May 2016

Moacir Alves de Andrade Junior (born 3 January 1989), simply known as Moacir, is a Brazilian footballer who plays as an attacking midfielder.

He made his debut in the FNL for FC Gazovik Orenburg on September 1, 2011 in a game against FC Baltika Kaliningrad.
