= Dudu Vieira =

Brazilian footballer (born 1994)

Personal information
- Full name: Carlos Eduardo de Souza Vieira
- Date of birth: 20 February 1994 (age 32)
- Place of birth: Campo Grande, Brazil
- Height: 1.76 m (5 ft 9 in)
- Position: Defensive midfielder

Team information
- Current team: Caxias

Youth career
- Francana
- 2013–2014: Santo André

Senior career*
Years	Team	Apps	(Gls)
2012	Cincão		
2014–2024	Santo André	102	(5)
2016	→ Portuguesa (loan)	4	(0)
2017	→ Figueirense (loan)	32	(2)
2018	→ São Bento (loan)	34	(1)
2019	→ Novorizontino (loan)	4	(0)
2019	→ Vitória (loan)	3	(0)
2019	→ São Bento (loan)	10	(0)
2020–2021	→ Ferroviária (loan)	16	(1)
2021	→ Criciúma (loan)	21	(1)
2022	→ Ituano (loan)	20	(1)
2023	→ Chapecoense (loan)	16	(1)
2024	Ponte Preta	14	(0)
2024	Juventude	5	(0)
2025	Paysandu	12	(0)
2026–	Caxias	4	(1)
- * Club domestic league appearances and goals as of 30 January 2026

Carlos Eduardo de Souza Vieira (born 20 February 1994), known as Dudu Vieira, is a Brazilian footballer who plays for Caxias. Mainly a defensive midfielder, he can also play as a right-back.

== Career ==
Born in Campo Grande, Mato Grosso do Sul, Dudu Vieira played for the youth sides of Francana before making his senior debut with Cincão in 2012. He moved to Santo André in the following year, before first appearing with the main squad in the 2014 Copa Paulista.

In June 2016, after winning the year's Campeonato Paulista Série A2, Dudu Vieira was loaned to Portuguesa in the Série C. In the following years, he served several loan stints at Figueirense, São Bento (two stints), Novorizontino, Vitória, Ferroviária, Criciúma, Ituano and Chapecoense.

On 20 March 2024, Dudu Vieira signed a permanent one-year deal with Ponte Preta. He moved to Série A side Juventude on 16 August, and made his top tier debut at the age of 30 two days later, coming on as a second-half substitute for Thiaguinho in a 2–1 away win over Athletico Paranaense.

== Career statistics ==
As of 17 June 2024.

Club	Season	League			State League		Cup		Continental		Other		Total	
Club	Season	Division	Apps	Goals	Apps	Goals	Apps	Goals	Apps	Goals	Apps	Goals	Apps	Goals
Santo André	2014	Paulista A2	—		—		—		—		14 (Note: Appearance(s) in Copa Paulista)	0	14	0
Santo André	2015	Paulista A2	—		9	1	1	0	—		—		10	1
Santo André	2016	Paulista A2	—		18	2	—		—		—		18	2
Santo André	2017	Paulista	—		14	0	1	0	—		—		15	0
Santo André	2018	Paulista	—		14	0	1	0	—		—		15	0
Santo André	2020	Paulista	—		10	1	2	0	—		—		12	1
Santo André	2022	Série D	0	0	13	0	—		—		—		13	0
Santo André	2023	Série D	0	0	13	1	—		—		—		13	1
Santo André	2024	Série D	0	0	11	0	—		—		—		11	0
Santo André	Total		0	0	102	5	—		—		14	0	116	5
Portuguesa (loan)	2016	Série C	4	0	—		—		—		—		4	0
Figueirense (loan)	2017	Série B	32	2	—		—		—		—		32	2
São Bento (loan)	2018	Série B	34	1	—		—		—		—		34	1
Novorizontino (loan)	2019	Série D	0	0	4	0	—		—		—		4	0
Vitória (loan)	2019	Série B	3	0	—		—		—		1 (Note: Appearance(s) in Copa do Nordeste)	0	4	0
São Bento (loan)	2019	Série B	10	0	—		—		—		—		10	0
Ferroviária	2020	Série D	13	1	—		—		—		—		13	1
Ferroviária	2021	Série D	0	0	3	0	—		—		—		3	0
Ferroviária	Total		13	1	3	0	—		—		—		16	1
Criciúma (loan)	2021	Série C	21	1	—		4	0	—		3 (Note: Appearance(s) in Copa Santa Catarina)	0	28	1
Ituano (loan)	2022	Série B	20	1	—		—		—		—		20	1
Chapecoense (loan)	2023	Série B	16	1	—		—		—		5	0	21	1
Ponte Preta	2024	Série B	14	0	—		—		—		—		14	0
Juventude	2024	Série A	1	0	—		—		—		—		1	0
Career total			168	7	109	5	4	0	0	0	23	0	304	12

== Honours ==
Santo André

- Copa Paulista: 2014
- Campeonato Paulista Série A2: 2016
