= Bruno Xavier (footballer) =

Brazilian footballer (born 1996)

Personal information
- Full name: Bruno Cesar Xavier Sislo
- Date of birth: 27 November 1996 (age 29)
- Place of birth: São Paulo, Brazil
- Height: 1.77 m (5 ft 10 in)
- Position: Attacking midfielder

Team information
- Current team: Vila Nova
- Number: 33

Youth career
- Portuguesa

Senior career*
Years	Team	Apps	(Gls)
2015–2017	Portuguesa	10	(2)
2017–2019	Nacional-SP	15	(10)
2017	→ Sport Recife (loan)	1	(0)
2018	→ Corinthians (loan)	0	(0)
2018	→ Guarani (loan)	10	(1)
2019	→ Oeste (loan)	3	(0)
2019	Desportivo Aves	4	(0)
2020	Juventude	4	(0)
2020	Juventus-SP	4	(3)
2020	Paraná	6	(0)
2021	Inter de Limeira	13	(2)
2021	Mirassol	12	(0)
2021	Juventus-SC	8	(4)
2022	Santo André	10	(0)
2022	Ferroviária	12	(2)
2022–2024	Água Santa	38	(3)
2023-2024	→ Ituano (loan)	34	(10)
2025	Vitória	8	(2)
2025–	Vila Nova	16	(2)
- * Club domestic league appearances and goals as of 17 December 2025

Bruno Cesar Xavier Sislo (born 27 November 1996), known as Bruno Xavier, is a Brazilian professional footballer who plays as an attacking midfielder for Vila Nova.

== Club career ==
Born in São Paulo, Bruno Xavier was a Portuguesa youth graduate. He made his senior debut on 8 June 2015, coming on as a late substitute for goalscorer Guilherme Queiróz in a 3–0 away win against Guaratinguetá for the Série C championship.

Definitely promoted to the main squad in June 2016, Bruno Xavier scored his first senior goal on 9 July of that year, netting the opener in a 2–1 away loss against the same opponent. On 9 July 2017, he terminated his contract with Lusa, and joined Nacional-SP late in the month.

On 23 August 2017, after scoring five goals in only six matches for Naça in the Copa Paulista, Bruno Xavier joined Série A side Sport initially on a trial basis. He subsequently signed a loan contract until the end of the year, and made his debut in the category on 10 September by replacing Samuel Xavier in a 1–0 loss at Avaí.

On 14 December 2017, Bruno Xavier was released by Sport and subsequently returned to Nacional. The following 24 April, after being the club's top goalscorer in the Campeonato Paulista Série A2, he signed a loan deal with Corinthians until May 2019.

== Career statistics ==
As of match played 11 February 2025

Appearances and goals by club, season and competition
Club	Season	League			State league		National cup (Note: Includes Copa do Brasil, Taça de Portugal)		Continental		Other		Total	
Club	Season	Division	Apps	Goals	Apps	Goals	Apps	Goals	Apps	Goals	Apps	Goals	Apps	Goals
Portuguesa	2015	Série C	2	0	0	0	0	0	—		—		2	0
Portuguesa	2016	Série C	8	2	0	0	1	0	—		—		9	2
Portuguesa	2017	Série D	0	0	14 (Note: Appearance(s) in Campeonato Paulista Série A2)	0	2	1	—		—		2	1
Portuguesa	Total		10	2	0	0	3	1	0	0	0	0	13	3
Nacional-SP	2017	—			0	0	—		—		6 (Note: Appearance(s) in Copa Paulista)	5	6	5
Nacional-SP	2018	—			15	10	—		—		0	0	15	10
Nacional-SP	2019	—			0	0	—		—		0	0	0	0
Nacional-SP	Total		0	0	15	10	0	0	0	0	6	5	21	15
Sport Recife (loan)	2017	Série A	1	0	0	0	0	0	0	0	0	0	1	0
Corinthians (loan)	2018	Série A	0	0	0	0	0	0	0	0	—		0	0
Guarani (loan)	2018	Série B	10	1	0	0	—		—		—		10	1
Oeste (loan)	2019	Série B	3	0	8 (Note: Appearance(s) in Campeonato Paulista Série A1)	0	2	1	—		—		13	1
Aves	2019-20	Primeira Liga	5	0	—		0	0	—		1 (Note: Appearance(s) in Taça da Liga)	0	6	0
Juventude	2020	Série B	0	0	2 (Note: Appearance(s) in Campeonato Gaúcho)	0	0	0	—		—		2	0
Juventus-SP	2020	—			4	3	—		—		—		4	3
Paraná	2020	Série B	6	0	0	0	0	0	—		—		6	0
Inter de Limeira	2021	Série D	0	0	13	2	—		—		—		13	2
Mirassol	2021	Série C	12	0	0	0	0	0	—		—		12	0
Juventus-SC	2021	Série D	0	0	0	0	—		—		8 (Note: Appearance(s) in Copa Santa Catarina)	4	8	4
Santo André	2022	Série D	0	0	10	0	—		—		—		10	0
Ferroviária	2022	Série D	12	2	0	0	0	0	—		—		12	2
Água Santa	2022	—			0	0	—		—		10	2	10	2
Água Santa	2023	—			15	0	—		—		—		15	0
Água Santa	2024	Série D	0	0	11	1	2	0	—		—		13	1
Água Santa	Total		0	0	26	1	2	0	0	0	10	2	38	3
Ituano (loan)	2023	Série B	7	2	0	0	0	0	—		—		7	2
Ituano (loan)	2024	Série B	27	8	0	0	0	0	—		—		27	8
Ituano (loan)	Total		34	10	0	0	0	0	0	0	0	0	34	10
Vitória	2025	Série A	0	0	5 (Note: Appearance(s) in Campeonato Baiano)	2	0	0	0	0	1 (Note: Appearance(s) in Copa do Nordeste)	0	6	2
Career total			93	15	97	18	7	2	0	0	26	11	223	46
