= Luís Carlos (footballer, born July 1987) =

Brazilian footballer

Personal information
- Full name: Luís Carlos Dallastella
- Date of birth: 28 July 1987 (age 39)
- Place of birth: Curitiba, Brazil
- Height: 1.90 m (6 ft 3 in)
- Position: Goalkeeper

Team information
- Current team: Inter de Limeira

Youth career
- 2005–2006: Paraná

Senior career*
Years	Team	Apps	(Gls)
2007–2013	Paraná	70	(0)
2009	→ Iguaçu (loan)		
2011	→ Ypiranga (loan)	7	(0)
2014–2015	Ceará	40	(0)
2016	Portuguesa	0	(0)
2016–2017	Guarani	1	(0)
2017	Figueirense	0	(0)
2017	Vila Nova	26	(0)
2018	Paraná	1	(0)
2019	Oeste	23	(0)
2020–2021	Juventude	7	(0)
2022	Botafogo-PB	11	(0)
2023	Nova Venécia		
2023–	Inter de Limeira	0	(0)
- * Club domestic league appearances and goals as of 16 July 2023

Luís Carlos Dallastella (born 28 July 1987), known as Luís Carlos, is a Brazilian footballer who plays as a goalkeeper for Inter de Limeira.
