= Douglas Maia =

Brazilian footballer (born 1989)

Personal information
- Full name: Douglas Donizete Maia de Oliveira
- Date of birth: 12 April 1989 (age 37)
- Place of birth: Americana, Brazil
- Height: 1.79 m (5 ft 10 in)
- Positions: Right back; midfielder

Youth career
- 2001–2006: PSTC
- 2006–2008: Atlético Paranaense

Senior career*
Years	Team	Apps	(Gls)
2008–2010	Atlético Paranaense	9	(0)
2009–2010	→ Náutico (loan)	10	(0)
2010–2011	Fluminense	11	(1)
2011–2012	Bonsucesso	14	(4)
2012	Camboriú	13	(5)
2012	Bragantino	12	(3)
2013–2014	OH Leuven	33	(6)
2016	Juventus-SP	17	(11)
2016	Portuguesa	9	(2)
2017	Nacional-SP	10	(3)
2018–2019	URT	25	(1)
2019	Patrocinense	8	(0)
2020	Passo Fundo	19	(`4)
2020	União Cacoalense	13	(1)
- * Club domestic league appearances and goals

Douglas Donizete Maia de Oliveira (born 12 April 1989), known as Douglas Maia, is a Brazilian professional footballer. Either a right back or midfielder, he can also play as a winger.
