= Alê (footballer, born 1986) =

Brazilian footballer (born 1986)

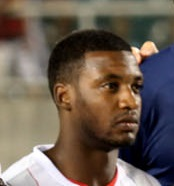
- Alê in 2011

Personal information
- Full name: Alexandre Luiz Fernandes
- Date of birth: 21 January 1986 (age 40)
- Place of birth: São Paulo, Brazil
- Height: 1.76 m (5 ft 9 in)
- Position: Defensive midfielder

Youth career
- 2000–2001: Juventus-SP
- 2001–2003: São Paulo

Senior career*
Years	Team	Apps	(Gls)
2004–2009	São Paulo	45	(0)
2006	→ Juventus-SP (Loan)	0	(0)
2006	→ Botafogo (Loan)	11	(0)
2007–2008	→ Cerezo Osaka (Loan)	64	(5)
2010	Santo André	28	(3)
2010–2014	Atlético Mineiro	11	(0)
2011	→ Atlético Paranaense (loan)	13	(0)
2011	→ Americana (loan)	30	(1)
2012	→ XV de Piracicaba (loan)	2	(0)
2013	→ Avaí (loan)	15	(0)
2014–2015	Rio Claro	13	(0)
2015	Boa Esporte	18	(0)
2016	São Bento	6	(0)
2016	Portuguesa	13	(0)
2017	Rio Claro	19	(0)
2018	Sertãozinho	14	(0)
2019–2020	Juventus-SP	11	(0)
2021	Atibaia	20	(0)
2022–2023	EC São Bernardo	41	(4)
2024–2025	São-Carlense	28	(0)
- * Club domestic league appearances and goals as of 26 March 2025

Alexandre Luiz Fernandes (born 21 January 1986), commonly known as Alê, is a Brazilian former professional footballer who played as a defensive midfielder.

== Career statistics ==
Club performance			League		Cup		Total	
Season	Club	League	Apps	Goals	Apps	Goals	Apps	Goals
Brazil			League		Copa do Brasil		Total	
2004	São Paulo	Série A	29	0			29	0
2005	São Paulo	Série A	10	0			10	0
2006	Juventus	Série C						
2006	São Paulo	Série A	1	0			1	0
2006	Botafogo	Série A	11	0			11	0
Japan			League		Emperor's Cup		Total	
2007	Cerezo Osaka	J2 League	35	2	2	0	37	2
2008	Cerezo Osaka	J2 League	29	3	0	0	29	3
Country	Brazil		51	0			51	0
Country	Japan		64	5	2	0	66	5
Total			115	5	2	0	117	5

== Honours ==
São Paulo

- Campeonato Paulista: 2005
- Copa Libertadores: 2005
- Campeonato Brasileiro: 2006
