= Rodrigo Thiesen =

Brazilian footballer

Personal information
- Date of birth: December 1, 1986 (age 39)
- Place of birth: Palhoça, Brazil
- Height: 1.80 m (5 ft 11 in)
- Position: Defensive midfielder

Team information
- Current team: Avaí

Youth career
- 1998–2000: Astel
- 2001: Colégio Visão
- 2002–2005: Guarani
- 2005–2006: Primavera

Senior career*
Years	Team	Apps	(Gls)
2006	Primavera		
2006	Internacional		
2007	Pelotas		
2007–2008	São Bento		
2008	→ Guarani (loan)		
2008	→ CFZ Imbituba (loan)		
2009	Coruripe		
2009	Imbituba		
2010–	Avaí	4	(0)
2010	→ Vila Nova (loan)	7	(0)
2011	→ América-RN (loan)		
2011	→ Chapecoense (loan)	8	(0)
2012	→ Volta Redonda (loan)		
- * Club domestic league appearances and goals as of October 16, 2011

Rodrigo Thiesen (born December 1, 1986) is a Brazilian professional footballer who plays as a defensive midfielder for Avaí Futebol Clube.

== Career ==
Rodrigo was born in Palhoça. He began his career in 1998 in Florianopolis Futsal clubs like the College Vision and Astel. After that, in 2002, was to try his luck in football in the youth of the Guarani in his hometown, where he came to compose the group along with the professionals in training. Guarani also competed in the junior championship of Santa Catarina.

Already in 2005, Rodrigo I headed to the base of the spring where they played junior Championship and the Copa São Paulo de Futebol Júnior. It was in spring that Thiesen also started a professional team, working on preparing the team for the Championship Series A3, 2006, in friendly matches.

Also in 2006, went to the main group of the Inter de Limeira to compete in the Championship Series A2. The following year he returned to southern Brazil to play in Pelotas in the Second Division Championship Gaucho.

Even in 2007, Rodrigo was hired by St. Benedict in 2008 and loaned to the Guarani in Santa Catarina and Goiás Itumbiara where he served in the Brazilian Championship Series C. It passed by Coruripe Imbituba and CLO in 2009. In the club championship was Catarina Catarina Special Branch.

With the good performance of the previous year, in 2010 he was hired by Thiesen Avaí. Participated in the cast who was Champion of Santa Catarina, and fall, was elected one of the best fly of the state. In the second half of this year after not being very tapped by then-coach Pericles Chamusca Avaí, Rodrigo is on loan at Villa Nova that has the pace to play. Months later, due to problems with wage arrears in Vila Nova, Thiesen back to Avaí.

On 8 June 2011, Thiesen moved to Brazilian Série C side Chapecoense on a loan deal, along with his Avaí team-mate Luiz Carlos Medina.

== Career statistics ==
(Correct as of October 16, 2010)

Club	Season	State League		Brazilian Série A		Copa do Brasil		Copa Sudamericana		Total	
Club	Season	Apps	Goals	Apps	Goals	Apps	Goals	Apps	Goals	Apps	Goals
Avaí	2010	-	-	4	0	-	-	-	-	?	?
Total		-	-	4	0	-	-	-	-	?	?
