= Bruno Nunes =

Brazilian football player (born 1990)

Personal information
- Full name: Bruno Fernandes Nunes
- Date of birth: 8 July 1990 (age 36)
- Place of birth: Petrolina, Brazil
- Height: 1.85 m (6 ft 1 in)
- Position: Forward

Team information
- Current team: Paraná Clube

Youth career
- Rio Preto

Senior career*
Years	Team	Apps	(Gls)
2010–2011	Rio Preto	28	(15)
2011–	Ponte Preta	18	(3)
2013	→ Mogi Mirim (loan)	4	(1)
2013–2014	→ Oeste (loan)	32	(8)
2014	→ Icasa (loan)	10	(1)
2015	→ Mirassol (loan)	11	(1)
2015	→ Fort Lauderdale Strikers (loan)	10	(1)
2016	→ Portuguesa (loan)	1	(0)
2016–2018	Portuguesa	0	(0)
2019	Jeonnam Dragons	25	(6)
2020	Juventude	8	(0)
2020–	Paraná Clube	0	(0)
- * Club domestic league appearances and goals as of 26 November 2019

Bruno Fernando Nunes (born 8 July 1990), known as Bruno Nunes, is a Brazilian professional footballer who plays for Paraná Clube as a forward.

On 29 June 2016, Bruno Nunes signed a three-year deal with Marítimo.

In the Spring of 2019, he joinedthe South Korean Club Jeonnam Dragons.
