= Felipe Alves (footballer, born November 1990) =

Brazilian footballer

Personal information
- Full name: Felipe Guimarães Alves
- Date of birth: 18 November 1990 (age 35)
- Place of birth: Flórida, Brazil
- Height: 1.79 m (5 ft 10 1/2 in)
- Position: Forward

Team information
- Current team: Uberlândia

Youth career
- Adap
- Real Massamá

Senior career*
Years	Team	Apps	(Gls)
2010	Red Bull Brasil	0	(0)
2011–2012	Penapolense	22	(6)
2012–2014	Avaí	23	(5)
2013	→ Penapolense (loan)	0	(0)
2013	→ Matsumoto Yamaga (loan)	1	(0)
2014	→ Santo André (loan)	0	(0)
2014	Luverdense	20	(1)
2015	Cuiabá	4	(0)
2015–2016	Manama	14	(8)
2016	Juventus-SP	0	(0)
2016	Portuguesa	5	(1)
2017	Mogi Mirim	0	(0)
2017	URT	7	(1)
2017	Ipatinga		
2018	URT	0	(0)
2018	Boa Esporte	6	(0)
2018	Osasco Audax		
2019	Patrocinense	0	(0)
2019	Joinville	2	(0)
2019	Pouso Alegre FC		
2020–	Uberlândia	0	(0)
- * Club domestic league appearances and goals as of 23:18, 31 March 2020 (UTC)

Felipe Guimarães Alves (born 18 November 1990), known as Felipe Alves, is a Brazilian footballer who plays as a forward for Uberlândia Esporte Clube.

== Club career ==
Born in Flórida, Paraná, Felipe Alves appeared for Adap and Real Massamá during his youth. He made his senior debut for Red Bull Brasil in 2010, appearing in Copa Paulista, and the following year represented Penapolense in Campeonato Paulista Série A3.

On 19 December 2011, Felipe Alves signed a contract with Série B club Avaí. He made his professional debut on 19 May 2012, starting in a 2–2 away draw against Boa Esporte; his first goal in the category came on 2 June, netting the first in a 1–2 home loss against rivals Joinville.

After loan spells back at Penapolense, Matsumoto Yamaga FC and Santo André, Felipe Alves was released by Avaí in May 2014 and immediately joined Luverdense. In January 2015 he moved to Cuiabá, being crowned champions of both Copa Verde and Campeonato Matogrossense; he was also selected in the Team of the Year of the latter.

On 10 September 2015 Felipe Alves moved abroad, signing for Bahraini Premier League club Manama. In February 2016 he returned to his homeland, joining Juventus.

On 3 June 2016, Felipe Alves agreed to a contract with Portuguesa.

== Honours ==
=== Club ===
Penapolense

- Campeonato Paulista Série A3: 2011

Avaí

- Campeonato Catarinense: 2012

Cuiabá

- Campeonato Matogrossense: 2015
- Copa Verde: 2015

=== Individual ===
- Campeonato Matogrossense Team of the Year: 2015
