= Matteus (footballer) =

Brazilian footballer

Personal information
- Full name: Matteus Oliveira Santos
- Date of birth: 11 October 1989 (age 37)
- Place of birth: Ubaitaba, Brazil
- Height: 1.78 m (5 ft 10 in)
- Position: Defensive midfielder

Senior career*
Years	Team	Apps	(Gls)
2012	Portuguesa Santista	9	(0)
2012–2013	Independente de Limeira	21	(3)
2013–2016	Atlético Paranaense	6	(0)
2013–2014	→ Ferroviária (loan)	9	(0)
2015	→ Guaratinguetá (loan)	6	(0)
2016	→ Portuguesa (loan)	0	(0)
2017–2018	Água Santa	11	(1)
- * Club domestic league appearances and goals

Matteus Oliveira Santos (born 11 October 1989), simply known as Matteus, is a Brazilian former footballer who played as a defensive midfielder.

== Club career ==
Born in Ubaitaba, Bahia, Matteus played amateur football well into his 20s. He was also on trial at FC Zürich in 2011, but nothing came of it, and he made his debuts as a senior with Portuguesa Santista in the following year.

In late 2012 Matteus joined Independente de Limeira, appearing regularly and being one of the club's most important players. On 28 May 2013 he moved to Atlético Paranaense, but was loaned to Ferroviária in August.

Matteus returned to Furacão in September 2014, and made his debut for the club on 7 December, coming on as a second-half substitute for Nathan in a 1–1 away draw against Palmeiras.
