= Michel Pires =

Brazilian footballer

Personal information
- Full name: Michel Celestino Pires Chaves
- Date of birth: 25 June 1989 (age 37)
- Place of birth: Rio de Janeiro, Brazil
- Height: 1.76 m (5 ft 9 in)
- Position: Midfielder

Team information
- Current team: Alagoinhas Atlético
- Number: 17

Senior career*
| Years | Team | Apps | (Gls) |
| 2010–2012 | Madureira | 10 | (0) |
| 2012 | → GIF Sundsvall (loan) | 7 | (0) |
| 2013 | Macaé | 0 | (0) |
| 2013 | Novo Hamburgo | 0 | (0) |
| 2014 | Santa Rita | | |
| 2014–2015 | Zacatepec | 34 | (1) |
| 2015 | Mineros de Zacatecas | 14 | (0) |
| 2016 | Gama | 0 | (0) |
| 2016 | → Portuguesa (loan) | 6 | (0) |
| 2017 | Sampaio Corrêa | 0 | (0) |
| 2018 | National-AM | 2 | (0) |
| 2018 | Barra da Tijuca | 0 | (0) |
| 2019 | Cabofriense | 0 | (0) |
| 2019 | UNIRB FC | 0 | (0) |
| 2020– | Alagoinhas Atlético | 0 | (0) |
- * Club domestic league appearances and goals as of 18 September 2016

Michel Celestino Pires Chaves (born 25 June 1989) is a Brazilian footballer who plays for Alagoinhas Atlético Clube as a midfielder.

He played with Los Cabos of the Liga de Balompié Mexicano during the league's inaugural season in 2020–21.
