= Luiz Carlos Medina =

Brazilian footballer

Personal information
- Full name: Luiz Carlos Medina
- Date of birth: 23 April 1990 (age 36)
- Place of birth: Jaraguá do Sul, Brazil
- Height: 1.72 m (5 ft 7 1/2 in)
- Positions: Right back; midfielder

Team information
- Current team: Bangu

Youth career
- 2006: Juventus
- 2007–2009: Avaí

Senior career*
| Years | Team | Apps | (Gls) |
| 2009–2012 | Avaí | 54 | (7) |
| 2010 | → ASA (loan) | 12 | (2) |
| 2011 | → Ituano (loan) | 5 | (0) |
| 2011 | → Chapecoense (loan) | 7 | (0) |
| 2012 | → Guarani (loan) | 25 | (2) |
| 2013 | Mirassol | 2 | (1) |
| 2014 | Guarani | 0 | (0) |
| 2019 | Bangu | | (0) |
- * Club domestic league appearances and goals as of 6 April 2014

Luiz Carlos Medina (born 23 April 1990), commonly known as Medina, is a Brazilian footballer who plays as right back or a midfielder.

== Career ==
Born in Jaraguá do Sul, Santa Catarina, Medina began his career in 2006 with hometown club Juventus. In 2007, he moved to Avaí, initially assigned to the under-20s.

Along with the time base of Avaí made a major campaign in the Copa São Paulo de Futebol Júnior 2009 when the club finished in third place, being disqualified in the semi-final champions Corinthians, and Medina scored three goals.

His great prominence began in 2009, when Medina was one of the highlights of the team winning the Championship Avaí Catarina.

The manager of Medina is the idol of Brazilian soccer, Falcão which came to announce the hiring of revelation Avaiana for Santos in April 2009, this announcement contradicted by the president of Avaí João Nílson Zunino. Another club that showed interest in having the football Medina was Vasco da Gama, but nothing has changed.

In the opening match of the Championship 2010 in Santa Catarina Avai the Brusque won by 3-0 Medina noted his first goal as a professional. It was the team's second goal on 33 minutes and was the first time.

In the second half of 2010, after two games played by Avaí Cup Sub-23, Medina is advertised as strengthening the ASA Arapiraca on loan to the continuing dispute Series B.

On 8 June 2011, he moved to Brazilian Série C side Chapecoense on free transfer along with his Avaí teammate Rodrigo Thiesen.

=== Career statistics ===
(Correct as of October 16, 2010)

| Club | Season | State League | | Brazilian Série A | | Copa do Brasil | | Copa Sudamericana | | Total | |
| Club | Season | Apps | Goals | Apps | Goals | Apps | Goals | Apps | Goals | Apps | Goals |
|---|---|---|---|---|---|---|---|---|---|---|---|
| Avaí | 2009 | ? | ? | ? | ? | - | - | - | - | 27 | 0 |
| Avaí | 2010 | ? | ? | ? | ? | - | - | - | - | 27 | 7 |
| Total | | ? | ? | ? | ? | - | - | - | - | 54 | 7 |

== Honours ==
Avaí

- Campeonato Catarinense: 2009, 2010
