= Natan (footballer, born 1993) =

Brazilian footballer

Personal information
- Full name: Dionatan Chaves da Silva
- Date of birth: 23 January 1993 (age 33)
- Place of birth: Três de Maio, Brazil
- Height: 1.74 m (5 ft 9 in)
- Position: Attacking midfielder

Youth career
- 2010–2011: Galícia
- 2011: São Paulo
- 2012–2013: Vitória
- 2013: Grêmio

Senior career*
Years	Team	Apps	(Gls)
2014	Grêmio	0	(0)
2014	→ Anápolis (loan)	3	(0)
2014	→ ASA (loan)	5	(0)
2015	Boa Esporte	0	(0)
2016	Portuguesa	0	(0)
2016	Fortaleza	1	(0)
2017	Oeste	0	(0)
2018	Taubaté	0	(0)
2018–2019	Krymteplytsia Molodizhne		
2019	Aimoré	0	(0)
- * Club domestic league appearances and goals as of 22:35, 3 June 2019 (UTC)

Dionatan Chaves da Silva (born 23 January 1993), commonly known as Natan, is a Brazilian footballer who plays as an attacking midfielder.

== Career ==
Natan was born in Três de Maio, Rio Grande do Sul. After representing Galícia, São Paulo and Vitória as a youth, he joined Grêmio on 19 August 2013, being assigned to the under-20s.

In January 2014 Natan was called up to Grêmio's first team, but was loaned to Anápolis shortly after. He made his debut as a senior with the latter team on 9 February, coming on as a half-time substitute in a 1–1 away draw against Aparecidense.

On 7 April 2014 Natan was loaned to Série C club ASA. He appeared sparingly with the club, and was subsequently released by Grêmio in the end of the year after his contract expired.

On 28 January 2015 Natan signed for Boa Esporte, and made his debut for the club four days later, again from the bench in a 1–2 Campeonato Mineiro loss at URT. On 8 February 2015 he scored his first professional goals, netting a brace in a 2–0 home win against Democrata-GV.

Despite being a regular with the club in Mineirão, Natan failed to make an appearance in Série B. On 30 November 2015, he moved to Portuguesa.
