= Nunes (footballer, born 1982) =

Brazilian footballer

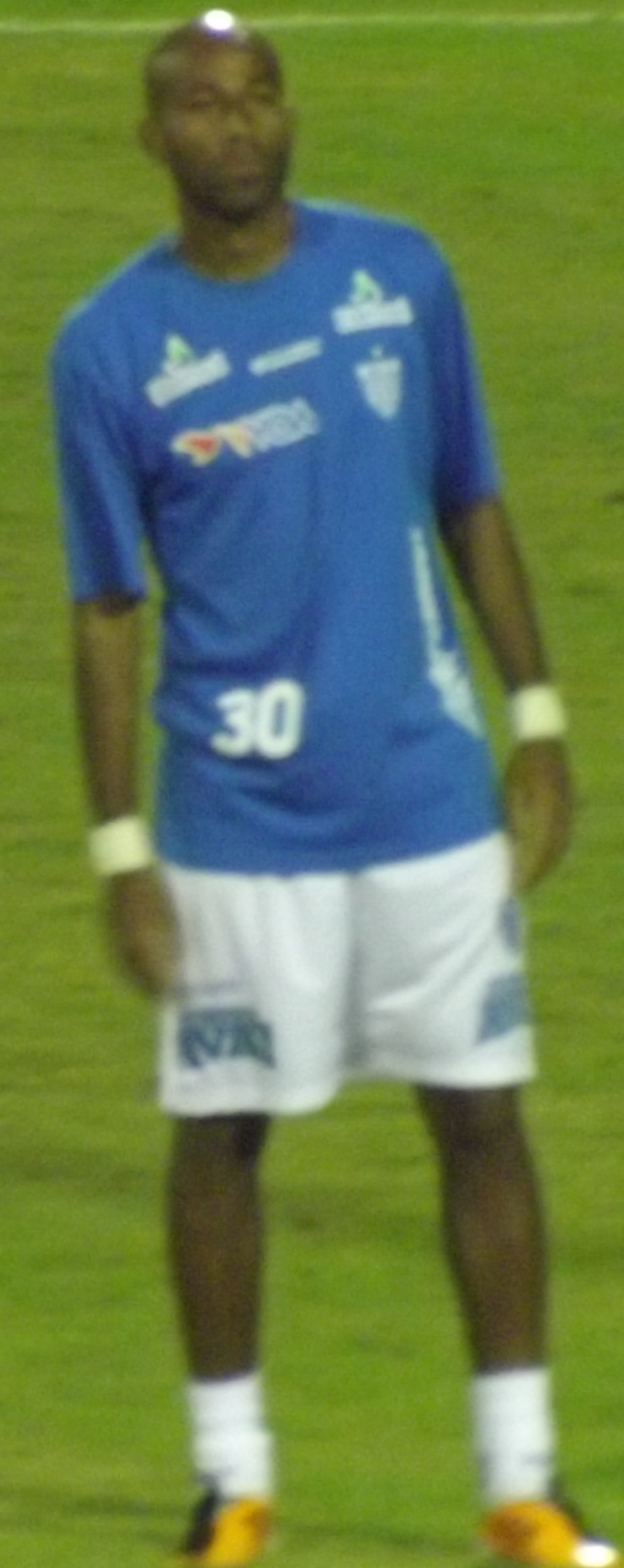
- Nunes in 2012

Personal information
- Full name: Anderson Francisco Nunes
- Date of birth: 21 January 1982 (age 44)
- Place of birth: São Paulo, Brazil
- Height: 1.85 m (6 ft 1 in)
- Position: Forward

Team information
- Current team: Gama

Senior career*
Years	Team	Apps	(Gls)
2002–2004	Santo André		
2005	Coritiba		
2005	Hatta Club		
2005	Rio Branco		
2006	Fortaleza		
2006	Juventus		
2006	Gama		
2007	América de Natal		
2007	Al-Ahli		
2008–2009	Bragantino	?	(15)
2009–2010	Santo André	31	(12)
2010	→ Vasco da Gama (loan)	13	(3)
2011	Red Bull Brasil	7	(6)
2011–2013	São Caetano	20	(9)
2012	→ Avaí (loan)	11	(1)
2013	→ Botafogo-SP (loan)	17	(7)
2013	Sport	18	(3)
2014	Santo André	18	(10)
2014	Bragantino	10	(0)
2015	Guarani	1	(0)
2015–2016	Botafogo-SP	13	(4)
2016	Portuguesa	8	(0)
2017	Brasiliense	0	(0)
2017	Mogi Mirim	3	(0)
2018	Brasiliense	10	(2)
2019	Gama	0	(0)
2019	Anápolis	0	(0)
2020–	Gama	0	(0)
- * Club domestic league appearances and goals as of 13:23, 9 September 2020 (UTC)

Anderson Francisco Nunes (born 21 January 1982), known simply as Nunes, is a Brazilian footballer who plays as a forward for Gama.

== Career ==
On 10 May 2010 CR Vasco da Gama signed the striker from Esporte Clube Santo André.

== Titles ==
Santo André

- São Paulo Juniors Cup: 2003
- Brazilian Cup: 2004

Al-Ahli

- Saudi Federation Cup: 2006-2007
- Crown Prince Cup: 2006-2007

Botafogo-SP

- Campeonato Brasileiro Série D: 2015

Brasiliense

- Campeonato Brasiliense: 2017
