= Mateus (footballer, born May 1984) =

Brazilian footballer

Personal information
- Full name: Mateus Alves Maciel
- Date of birth: 2 May 1984 (age 42)
- Place of birth: Turmalina, Brazil
- Height: 1.91 m (6 ft 3 in)
- Position: Centre back

Team information
- Current team: Villa Nova

Youth career
- Cruzeiro

Senior career*
Years	Team	Apps	(Gls)
2007–2008	Uberaba		
2008–2009	Ipatinga		
2009	Atlético Goianiense		
2009–2010	Caldense	5	(0)
2010	Concórdia		
2011	Ypiranga Erechim	16	(5)
2011	Portuguesa	23	(2)
2012	Cruzeiro	20	(1)
2013	Sport	0	(0)
2013	Figueirense	20	(0)
2014	Boa Esporte	5	(0)
2014	Universitatea Cluj	16	(0)
2015	Hermann Aichinger	14	(0)
2016	Guarani	0	(0)
2016	Portuguesa	9	(0)
2017–	Villa Nova	0	(0)
- * Club domestic league appearances and goals as of 18 September 2016

Mateus Alves Maciel (born 2 May 1984 in Turmalina), known as just Mateus, is a Brazilian footballer who plays for Villa Nova as a central defender.

He represented a number of clubs, notably playing for Portuguesa in 2011.

== Honours ==
Portuguesa

- Campeonato Brasileiro Série B: 2011
