= Guilherme Lopes =

Brazilian footballer (born 1992)

Personal information
- Full name: Guilherme Lopes da Silva
- Date of birth: 23 August 1992 (age 34)
- Place of birth: São Paulo, Brazil
- Position: Attacking midfielder

Youth career
- Ponte Preta
- 2011–2012: Grêmio Osasco

Senior career*
| Years | Team | Apps | (Gls) |
| 2012–2014 | Grêmio Osasco | 0 | (0) |
| 2013 | → Porto B (loan) | 1 | (0) |
| 2014 | → Audax Rio (loan) | 4 | (0) |
| 2015 | Nova Iguaçu | 1 | (0) |
| 2015–2016 | Independente de Limeira | 7 | (0) |
| 2016 | Portuguesa | 0 | (0) |
- * Club domestic league appearances and goals as of 11:38, 11 October 2015 (UTC)

Guilherme Lopes da Silva (born 23 August 1992), known as Guilherme Lopes or simply Guilherme, is a Brazilian footballer who plays as an attacking midfielder.

== Club career ==
Born in São Paulo, Guilherme Lopes was a Grêmio Osasco youth graduate, and made his senior debut for the club on 1 August 2012 by starting in a 2–3 home loss against Palmeiras for the year's Copa Paulista. On 31 January of the following year he moved abroad, signing a six-month loan deal with F.C. Porto and being assigned to the reserves in Liga de Honra.

Guilherme Lopes made his professional debut on 7 April 2013, coming on as a late substitute for Tozé in a 2–0 home win against F.C. Arouca; it was his only appearance for the club before his loan expired. He subsequently served another temporary stint at Audax Rio de Janeiro before being released.

On 6 November 2015 Guilherme Lopes signed for Independente de Limeira, after previously representing Nova Iguaçu. In June of the following year, he moved to Série C club Portuguesa.
