= João Henrique (footballer, born 1987) =

Brazilian footballer

Personal information
- Full name: João Henrique da Silva
- Date of birth: 13 January 1987 (age 39)
- Place of birth: São José do Rio Preto, Brazil
- Height: 1.79 m (5 ft 10 in)
- Position: Forward

Team information
- Current team: CRAC

Youth career
- 2007: América-SP

Senior career*
Years	Team	Apps	(Gls)
2008	Barretos	27	(3)
2009	Batatais	12	(4)
2009–2010	América-SP	9	(0)
2010	União Barbarense	0	(0)
2011	Catanduvense	21	(5)
2011	Marília	2	(0)
2012	Linense	11	(0)
2012	Juventude	6	(0)
2013	Paulista	12	(1)
2013	Juventude	2	(0)
2014	Comercial-SP	5	(0)
2014	ABC	22	(1)
2015	Catanduvense	6	(4)
2015	CRB	2	(0)
2015	Guarani	4	(0)
2016	Flamurtari	17	(1)
2016	Rio Preto	0	(0)
2016	→ Portuguesa (loan)	5	(0)
2017–	CRAC	0	(0)
- * Club domestic league appearances and goals as of 18 September 2016

João Henrique da Silva (born 13 January 1987 in São José do Rio Preto), known as João Henrique, is a Brazilian footballer who plays for CRAC as a forward.

He spent the majority of his career representing clubs in the São Paulo state, and had his first experience abroad with Albanian club Flamurtari Vlorë. João Henrique played for ABC Futebol Clube in Campeonato Brasileiro Série B.
