= Digão (footballer, born 1993) =

Brazilian footballer

Personal information
- Full name: Rodrigo Longo Freitas
- Date of birth: 13 March 1993 (age 33)
- Place of birth: Rio de Janeiro, Brazil
- Height: 1.77 m (5 ft 10 in)
- Position: Right-back

Youth career
- 2001–2013: Flamengo

Senior career*
Years	Team	Apps	(Gls)
2012–2014	Flamengo	7	(0)
2014	→ América-RN (loan)	0	(0)
2015	Volta Redonda	1	(0)
2016	Portuguesa	14	(0)
2016–2019	Adanaspor	63	(1)
2021	Bangu	9	(0)
2021	Santa Cruz	4	(0)
- * Club domestic league appearances and goals as of 21:44, 6 December 2023 (UTC)

Rodrigo Longo Freitas (born 13 March 1993), commonly known as Digão, is a Brazilian professional former footballer who played as a right-back.

== Career ==
Born in Rio de Janeiro, Digão joined Flamengo's youth setup in 2001, aged only eight. In 2011, after Rafael Galhardo's call-up to Brazil under-20s, he was promoted to the main squad by manager Vanderlei Luxemburgo and acted mainly as a backup to Léo Moura.

Digão made his senior debut on 21 January 2012, in a 4–0 Campeonato Carioca home routing of Bonsucesso. On 18 June of the following year he renewed his contract, signing until the end of 2014.

On 27 June 2014, after being rarely used, Digão was loaned to América-RN until the end of the year. He made no appearances for the side, and was subsequently released by his parent club when his loan expired.

In October 2015 Digão moved to Volta Redonda. On 1 December of that year he joined Portuguesa.
