= 2016 Campeonato Brasileiro Série C =

Campeonato Brasileiro Série C
- Season: 2016
- Champions: Boa Esporte
- Promoted: ABC; Boa Esporte; Guarani; Juventude
- Relegated: América de Natal; Portuguesa; Ríver; Guaratinguetá
- Matches: 194
- Goals: 435 (2.24 per match)
- Top goalscorer: 12 goals Jones Carioca, ABC
- Biggest home win: 6–0 Guarani v ABC; SF 2nd leg, 23 Oct
- Biggest away win: 0–5 Guaratinguetá v Juventude; R2, 29 May; Portuguesa v Botafogo-SP; R4, 12 June
- Highest attendance: 63,903 Fortaleza 1–1 Juventude; QF 2nd leg, 9 October
- Lowest attendance: 4 Guaratinguetá 0–3 Macaé; R16, 4 September
- Total attendance: 762,264
- Average attendance: 4,055
- All statistics correct as of 19:12, 9 November 2016 (UTC).

The Serie C of the Brazilian Championship 2016 is a football competition being held in Brazil, equivalent to the third division. It is being contested by 20 clubs in two geographic groups.

== Teams ==
Location of teams in 2016 Série C

Team	Home city	Manager
ABC	Natal	(Brazil) Geninho
América de Natal	Natal	(Brazil) Francisco Diá
ASA	Arapiraca	(Brazil) Paulo Foiani
Boa Esporte	Varginha	(Brazil) Ney da Matta
Botafogo-PB	João Pessoa	(Brazil) Itamar Schülle
Botafogo-SP	Ribeirão Preto	(Brazil) Márcio Fernandes
Confiança	Aracaju	(Brazil) Roberto Fernandes
Cuiabá	Cuiabá	(Brazil) Roberto Fonseca
Fortaleza	Fortaleza	(Brazil) Marquinhos Santos
Guarani	Campinas	(Brazil) Marcelo Chamusca
Guaratinguetá	Guaratinguetá	(Brazil) João Telê
Juventude	Caxias do Sul	(Brazil) Antônio Carlos Zago
Macaé	Macaé	(Brazil) Josué Teixeira
Mogi Mirim	Mogi Mirim	(Brazil) Mário Júnior
Portuguesa	São Paulo	(Brazil) Márcio Ribeiro
Remo	Belém	(Brazil) Waldemar Lemos
Ríver	Teresina	(Brazil) Marcão
Salgueiro	Salgueiro	(Brazil) Evandro Guimarães
Tombense	Tombos	(Brazil) Moacir Júnior
Ypiranga	Erechim	(Brazil) Leocir Dall'Astra

=== Number of teams by state ===
Number of teams	State	Team(s)
5	São Paulo	Botafogo, Guarani, Guaratinguetá, Mogi Mirim and Portuguesa
2	Minas Gerais	Boa Esporte and Tombense
2	Rio Grande do Norte	ABC and América de Natal
2	Rio Grande do Sul	Juventude and Ypiranga
1	Alagoas	ASA
1	Ceará	Fortaleza
1	Mato Grosso	Cuiabá
1	Pará	Remo
1	Paraíba	Botafogo
1	Pernambuco	Salgueiro
1	Piauí	Ríver
1	Rio de Janeiro	Macaé
1	Sergipe	Confiança

== League table ==
=== Group A ===
Pos	Team	Pld	W	D	L	GF	GA	GD	Pts	Qualification or relegation
1	Fortaleza (Q)	18	8	6	4	26	17	+9	30	Qualification for Final Stage
2	ABC (Q)	18	8	6	4	24	15	+9	30	Qualification for Final Stage
3	Botafogo-PB (Q)	18	7	7	4	19	13	+6	28	Qualification for Final Stage
4	ASA (Q)	18	6	8	4	16	15	+1	26	Qualification for Final Stage
5	Remo	18	6	7	5	21	20	+1	25	
6	Cuiabá	18	5	7	6	19	17	+2	22	
7	Confiança	18	5	7	6	22	26	−4	22	
8	Salgueiro	18	5	6	7	13	18	−5	21	
9	América de Natal (R)	18	5	5	8	17	23	−6	20	Relegation to 2017 Campeonato Brasileiro Série D
10	Ríver (R)	18	2	7	9	13	26	−13	13	Relegation to 2017 Campeonato Brasileiro Série D

Updated to match(es) played on 18 September 2016. Source: Soccerway.com
Rules for classification: 1) points; 2) wins; 3) goal difference; 4) goals scored; 5) head-to-head results; 6) least red cards received; 7) least yellow cards received; 8) draw.
(Q) Qualified for the phase indicated; (R) Relegated

Home \ Away	ABC	AMN	ASA	BOT	CON	CUI	FOR	REM	RIV	SAL
ABC		1–0	2–2	1–1	0–0	2–1	2–1	2–0	4–0	2–0
América-RN	1–0		1–2	1–1	0–2	0–1	0–3	1–1	1–1	2–0
ASA	2–1	2–0		0–0	1–1	1–0	1–1	2–2	0–0	0–0
Botafogo-PB	2–0	1–2	2–0		2–1	1–0	0–0	2–0	2–1	2–0
Confiança	1–1	0–2	1–0	1–1		1–1	0–2	3–5	4–1	2–1
Cuiabá	2–2	2–2	2–0	2–0	3–0		2–0	1–1	0–1	0–0
Fortaleza	0–1	2–1	2–1	1–0	2–2	2–0		4–1	1–1	3–1
Remo	1–1	0–0	0–1	0–0	2–0	2–0	2–0		1–0	1–1
River	0–2	2–3	0–0	2–2	1–2	0–0	1–1	1–2		1–0
Salgueiro	1–0	2–0	0–1	1–0	1–1	2–2	1–1	1–0	1–0	

Legend: Blue = home team win; Yellow = draw; Red = away team win.

=== Group B ===
Pos	Team	Pld	W	D	L	GF	GA	GD	Pts	Qualification or relegation
1	Guarani (Q)	18	11	5	2	26	11	+15	38	Qualification for Final Stage
2	Boa Esporte (Q)	18	10	5	3	28	10	+18	35	Qualification for Final Stage
3	Botafogo-SP (Q)	18	8	7	3	28	13	+15	31	Qualification for Final Stage
4	Juventude (Q)	18	8	6	4	28	18	+10	30	Qualification for Final Stage
5	Tombense	18	8	5	5	27	16	+11	29	
6	Ypiranga de Erechim	18	8	4	6	22	23	−1	28	
7	Mogi Mirim	18	5	7	6	12	15	−3	22	
8	Macaé	18	4	4	10	16	26	−10	16	
9	Portuguesa (R)	18	4	2	12	13	26	−13	14	Relegation to 2017 Campeonato Brasileiro Série D
10	Guaratinguetá (R)	18	1	1	16	13	55	−42	4	Relegation to 2017 Campeonato Brasileiro Série D

Updated to match(es) played on 18 September 2016. Source: Soccerway.com
Rules for classification: 1) points; 2) wins; 3) goal difference; 4) goals scored; 5) head-to-head results; 6) least red cards received; 7) least yellow cards received; 8) draw.
(Q) Qualified for the phase indicated; (R) Relegated

Home \ Away	BOA	BRP	GUA	GTA	JUV	MAC	MOG	POR	TOM	YPI
Boa Esporte		0–0	1–0	4–0	2–1	2–0	1–1	1–0	1–1	2–0
Botafogo-SP	2–0		1–2	6–2	1–1	1–1	1–0	2–1	1–0	1–0
Guarani	2–1	0–0		4–0	1–1	1–0	1–0	1–0	2–0	2–1
Guaratinguetá	0–4	0–4	0–1		0–5	0–3	0–1	2–1	2–2	1–3
Juventude	1–1	0–0	0–2	4–0		2–1	2–1	1–2	3–0	1–1
Macaé	1–5	1–1	2–4	3–1	1–2		0–1	1–0	0–0	0–2
Mogi Mirim	0–0	0–0	1–0	2–1	1–2	0–0		0–0	1–1	3–1
Portuguesa	0–2	0–5	0–0	3–1	1–2	1–2	1–0		0–2	3–1
Tombense	0–1	3–1	1–1	2–1	3–0	1–0	4–0	2–0		4–0
Ypiranga	1–0	2–1	2–2	3–2	0–0	2–0	0–0	1–0	2–1	

Legend: Blue = home team win; Yellow = draw; Red = away team win.

== Final Stage ==
The final stage consists of three rounds of two-legged knock-out ties. In the quarter-final, the team ranked 1st in Group A will play the team ranked 4th in Group B and so on.

=== Bracket ===
Team shown first in each tie has home advantage in the 2nd leg.

Quarter-Finals
Fortaleza	0	1	1
Juventude (a)	0	1	1
Boa Esporte	0	1	1
Botafogo-PB	0	0	0
ABC	0	1	1
Botafogo-SP	0	0	0
Guarani	1	3	4
ASA	3	0	3

Semi-Finals
Juventude	1	1	2
Boa Esporte	2	2	4
ABC	4	0	4
Guarani	0	6	6

Final
Boa Esporte	1	3	4
Guarani	1	0	1

=== Final ===
29 October 2016
19:15 UTC−2

Guarani	1–1	Boa Esporte
Leandro Amaro 61'	Report	Rodolfo 75'

Estádio Brinco de Ouro, Campinas
Attendance: 13,345
5 November 2016
18:45 UTC−2

Boa Esporte	3–0	Guarani
Braian 9'; Fellipe Mateus 14'; Kaio Cristian 90+2'	Report

Estádio Melão, Varginha
Attendance: 7,696

== Top scorers ==
As of matches played 29 October 2016

Rank	Player	Club	Goals
1	Jones Carioca	ABC	12
2	Daniel	Tombense	9
2	Reinaldo Alagoano	ASA	9
2	Fumagalli	Guarani	9
5	Daniel Sobralense	Fortaleza	8
5	Hugo	Juventude	8
7	Ricardinho	Boa Esporte	7
7	Anselmo	Fortaleza	7
7	Edno	Remo	7
7	João Paulo	Ypiranga	7
7	Daniel	Boa Esporte	7
