= Digão (footballer, born 1986) =

Brazilian footballer

Personal information
- Full name: Rodrigo Candido Andrade
- Date of birth: 22 May 1986 (age 40)
- Place of birth: Curitiba, Brazil
- Height: 1.73 m (5 ft 8 in)
- Position: Left back

Youth career
- 2004–2005: Paraná

Senior career*
Years	Team	Apps	(Gls)
2006–2007	Paraná	1	(0)
2007	→ Gama (loan)		
2008	Gama		
2009	Rio Branco-PR		
2010	União de Rondonópolis		
2010	Operário Ferroviário		
2010	Pato Branco		
2010–2012	Corinthians Paranaense	24	(0)
2011	→ Goiás (loan)	5	(0)
2013	Cianorte	15	(0)
2013	Grêmio Barueri		
2013–2014	Pelotas	6	(0)
2014	Paranavaí		
2015	São Francisco-PA		
2015	SC Litoral		
2016	Maringá	0	(0)
2016	Portuguesa	3	(0)
- * Club domestic league appearances and goals as of 9 July 2016

Rodrigo Andrade Cândido (born 22 May 1986 in Curitiba), known as Digão or simply Rodrigo, is a Brazilian footballer who plays as a left back.
