= Rio Claro Futebol Clube =

Football club based in São Paulo, Brazil

Rio Claro
- Full name: Rio Claro Futebol Clube
- Nicknames: Galo Azul; Azulão; Aguinha
- Founded: 9 May 1909; 116 years ago
- Ground: Dr. Augusto Schimidt Filho
- Chairman: Dayvid Medeiros
- Head coach: Adilson Teodoro
- League: Campeonato Paulista Série A3
- 2025: Paulista Série A2, 16th of 16 (relegated)
Home colours	Away colours

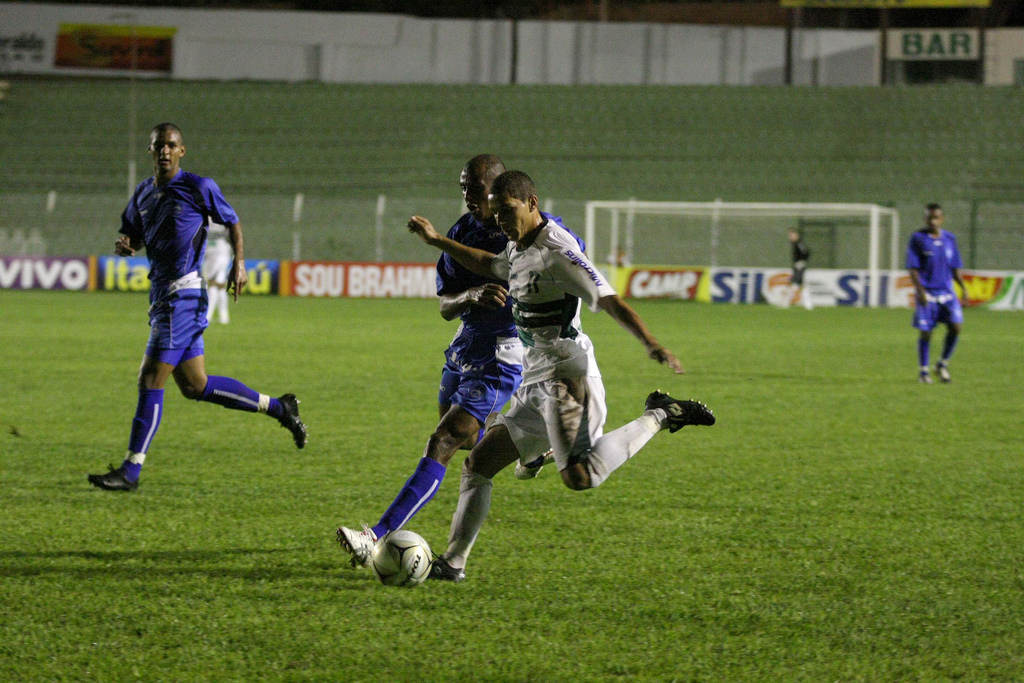
Rio Preto and Rio Claro in action in the 2008 Campeonato Paulista

Rio Claro Futebol Clube, commonly referred to as Rio Claro, is a Brazilian professional association football club based in Rio Claro, São Paulo. The team competes in Campeonato Paulista Série A3, the third tier of the São Paulo state football league.

The club's home colours are blue and white and the team mascot is a rooster.

== History ==
On 9 May 1909, the club was founded as Rio Claro Football Club by the teacher Joaquim Arnold, and by the Companhia Paulista das Estradas de Ferro (São Paulo Railroad Company) railroad employees Bento Estevam Siqueira, Constantino Carrocine and João Lambach. Years later, the club was renamed to Rio Claro Futebol Clube.

On 14 July 1928, Rio Claro played its first international match, against H.M.S. Capton's sailors of England.

In 2002, the club won the Campeonato Paulista Fourth Level (named B1), beating Guaratinguetá Esporte Clube in the final. The club was promoted to the following year's third level.

In 2005, Rio Claro was Copa FPF's runner-up. In the final, the club was defeated by Noroeste.

In 2007, the club disputed the Campeonato Paulista Série A1 for the first time. The team also played in Série A1 in 2008, 2010, 2014, 2015 and 2016.

== Current squad ==
Note: Flags indicate national team as defined under FIFA eligibility rules; some limited exceptions apply. Players may hold more than one non-FIFA nationality.

No.	Pos.	Nation	Player
—	GK	BRA	Leandro Alcacis
—	GK	BRA	Richard
—	DF	BRA	Carlinhos Miranda
—	DF	BRA	Gilberto
—	DF	BRA	Johannes
—	DF	BRA	Luiz Eduardo (on loan from São Paulo)
—	DF	BRA	Luís Felipe (on loan from Benfica)
—	DF	BRA	Pitty
—	DF	BRA	Renan Diniz
—	DF	BRA	Renan Luis
—	DF	BRA	Rodrigo Ninja
—	DF	BRA	Vinícius Bovi
—	MF	BRA	Alê

No.	Pos.	Nation	Player
—	MF	BRA	Guarú
—	MF	BRA	Jéferson Paulista (on loan from Botafogo)
—	MF	BRA	Léo Cordeiro
—	MF	BRA	Lucas Madalosso
—	MF	BRA	Matheus Galdezani
—	MF	BRA	Nando Carandina
—	MF	BRA	Nenê Bonilha
—	MF	BRA	Patrik (on loan from Palmeiras)
—	MF	BRA	Valdeci Jr
—	FW	BRA	André Luiz
—	FW	BRA	Paulinho (on loan from Corinthians)
—	FW	BRA	Rafael Tardini

== Honours ==
- Campeonato Paulista Série A2
  - Winners (2): 1928, 1929
- Campeonato Paulista Série A4
  - Winners (1): 2002

== Stadium ==
Rio Claro's home stadium is Estádio Augusto Schmidt Filho, usually known as Schimitão or Schimidtão, inaugurated in 1973, with a maximum capacity of 16,000 people.

The club also owns a training ground, named Centro de Treinamento Augusto Schmidt Filho.

== Club colors ==
Rio Claro's colors are blue and white. The club's home kit is composed of a blue shirt, white short and blue socks.

== Mascot ==
A white rooster wearing the club's blue home kit and with a blue tail, blue crest and blue wattle, named Galo Azul, is the club's mascot. The mascot was chosen after Velo Clube's mascot, which is a red rooster. Velo Clube is Rio Claro's rival.

== Nickname ==
The club was originally nicknamed Aguinha, meaning Little Water, because the club's stadium was located near the Córrego da Servidão's (Servidão's Creek) margin.

Rio Claro's nickname is Azulão, meaning Big Blue.
