= Sociedade Esportiva Palmeiras B =

Palmeiras B
- Full name: Sociedade Esportiva Palmeiras B
- Nickname(s): Verdinho (Little Green); Palestrinha; Alviverde (The Green Whites); Porco (Pig)
- Founded: 26 August 2000
- Dissolved: 2013; 12 years ago
- Ground: Estádio Rua Javari (2013 Season); São Paulo, Brazil
- Capacity: 4000
- League: Campeonato Paulista Série A3
- 2013: 18th
| Home colours | Away colours |

Sociedade Esportiva Palmeiras B, usually called Palmeiras B, was a Brazilian football team from São Paulo. They were the reserve team of Sociedade Esportiva Palmeiras and stopped their activities in 2013. Palmeiras B's last match was a draw home against Sertãozinho.

== Season to season ==
| Season | Division | Place | Copa FPF |
|---|---|---|---|
| 2000 | 5th | 2nd | |
| 2001 | 4th | 3rd | |
| 2002 | 3rd | 7th | |
| 2003 | 3rd | 4th | First round |
| 2004 | 3rd | 13th | First round |
| 2005 | 3rd | 2nd | First round |
| 2006 | 2nd | 8th | Second round |
| 2007 | 2nd | 17th | |
| 2008 | 3rd | 15th | |
| 2009 | 3rd | 11th | 23rd |
| 2010 | 3rd | 3rd | 28th |
| 2011 | 2nd | 15th | 16th |
| 2012 | 2nd | 17th | 11th |
| 2013 | 3rd | 18th | |

== Achievements ==
Palmeiras B won the following competitions:

Algisto Lourenzatto Trophy (Brazil):

- Winners (1): 2000

IFA Shield (IFA) (India):

- Runners Up(1): 2001 (Disqualified after starting a brawl)

China-Brazil Tournament (China):

- Winners (1): 2004

Estudiantes de La Plata Centennial Trophy (Argentina):

- Winners (1): 2005

Blumenau Trophy (Brazil):

- Winners (1): 2005

Nereu Ramos Trophy (Brazil):

- Winners (1): 2005

Bellinzona International Tournament (Switzerland):

- Winners (1): 2007

Taiyuan City Trophy (China):

- Winners (1): 2011

== See also ==
- SE Palmeiras
