= 2011 CR Vasco da Gama season =

Vasco da Gama
2011 season
- President: Roberto Dinamite
- Head Coach: Cristóvão since 28 August (Ricardo Gomes since 1 February until 28 August) (Paulo César Gusmão until 28 January)
- Stadium: São Januário; Engenhão
- Brasileirão Série A: Runners-up
- Copa do Brasil: Champion
- Rio de Janeiro State Championship: 6th Guanabara Tournament: Group stage Rio de Janeiro Tournament: Runners-up
- Copa Sudamericana: Semifinals
- Top goalscorer: League: Diego Souza (11); Élton (11); All: Bernardo (18)
- Highest home attendance: 33,778 (versus Botafogo in Brasileirão Série A)
Home colours	Away colours	Third colours

The 2011 season was Club de Regatas Vasco da Gama's 113th year in existence, the club's 96th season in existence of football, and the club's 40th season playing in the Brasileirão Série A, the top flight of Brazilian football, having been out only in 2009, after a relegation from top division in 2008, backing in 2010.

Vasco da Gama finished Brasileirão Série A as runners-up, 2 points behind winners Corinthians, in a title decided in last round, when Corinthians draw 0–0 against Palmeiras and Vasco da Gama draw 1–1 against Flamengo. Vasco da Gama in Copa Sudamericana goes at semifinals, after a 1–3 aggregate loss against eventual winners Universidad de Chile. Vasco da Gama won their first Copa do Brasil title, after an epic finals against Coritiba, winning in away goals rule after a 3–3 aggregate draw. Vasco da Gama finished Rio de Janeiro State Championship in 6th place, after a fall in group stage of Taça Guanabara and a runners-up against Flamengo in Taça Rio in a 1–3 penalty loss after a 0–0 draw.

== Club ==
=== Coaching staff ===
Updated 2 November 2011.

Position	Name	Nationality
Head coach	Ricardo Gomes	Brazilian
Assistant coach	Cristóvão (caretaker head coach), Gaúcho, Silveira, Jorge Luiz	Brazilian
Physiologists	Rodnei, Daniel Gonçalves	Brazilian
Supervisors	Daniel Freitas (football); Fabiano Lunz (logistics), Bruno Coev (heritage)	Brazilian
Fitness coaches	Rodrigo Poletto, Romildo, Armando	Brazilian
Masseurs	PC, Carlão, Curumim	Brazilian
Wardrobes	Adão, Niltinho	Brazilian
Physicologist	Maria Helena Rodriguez	Brazilian
Nutritionist	Mildre Souza	Brazilian
Press officers	Patrícia Gregório, Vinicius Melo	Brazilian
Goalkeepers coach	Carlos Germano	Brazilian

=== Other personnel ===
President	(Brazil) Roberto Dinamite
Manager of football	(Brazil) Rodrigo Caetano
Ground (capacity and dimensions)	São Januário (25,000 / 110x75 meters)

Source: CBF

== Players ==
=== First-team squad ===
Note: Flags indicate national team as defined under FIFA eligibility rules; some limited exceptions apply. Players may hold more than one non-FIFA nationality. Squad correct as of 24 October 2011.

No.	Pos.	Nation	Player
1	GK	BRA	Fernando Prass
3	DF	BRA	Cesinha
5	MF	BRA	Nílton
6	MF	BRA	Felipe
7	FW	BRA	Éder Luís (on loan from Benfica)
8	MF	BRA	Juninho Pernambucano (captain)
9	FW	BRA	Alecsandro
10	MF	BRA	Diego Souza (on loan from Desportivo Brasil)
12	GK	BRA	Alessandro
13	DF	BRA	Victor Ramos (on loan from Standard Liège)
15	FW	BRA	Jonathan (youth player)
16	DF	BRA	Douglas
17	DF	BRA	Julinho (on loan from Avaí)
18	MF	BRA	Jumar (on loan from Desportivo Brasil)
19	FW	BRA	Leandro (on loan from Grêmio)
21	MF	BRA	Fellipe Bastos (on loan from Benfica)
22	DF	PAR	Julio Irrazábal
23	DF	BRA	Fagner
26	DF	BRA	Dedé
27	MF	BRA	Diego Rosa
28	MF	BRA	Eduardo Costa
29	FW	BRA	Kim
30	FW	BRA	Patric
31	MF	BRA	Bernardo (on loan from Cruzeiro)
32	DF	BRA	Márcio Careca
33	DF	BRA	Renato Silva (on loan from Shandong Luneng)
35	MF	BRA	Allan (youth player, on loan from Deportivo Maldonado)
37	MF	BRA	Rômulo
39	FW	BRA	Élton (on loan from Olé Brasil)
43	DF	BRA	Max
44	FW	BRA	William Barbio (on loan from Nova Iguaçu)
45	MF	ARG	Leandro Chaparro (on loan from Desportivo Brasil)
50	GK	BRA	Diogo Silva (on loan from Nova Iguaçu)

==== Youth players able to play on first team ====
Note: Flags indicate national team as defined under FIFA eligibility rules; some limited exceptions apply. Players may hold more than one non-FIFA nationality. Squad correct as of 24 October 2011.

No.	Pos.	Nation	Player
2	DF	BRA	Jomar (youth player)
—	MF	BRA	Elivelton (youth player)
—	MF	BRA	Guilherme (youth player)
14	DF	BRA	Luan (youth player)
—	FW	BRA	Willen (youth player)

==== Out of loan ====
Note: Flags indicate national team as defined under FIFA eligibility rules; some limited exceptions apply. Players may hold more than one non-FIFA nationality. Squad correct as of 24 October 2011.

No.	Pos.	Nation	Player
—	GK	BRA	Adilson (on loan to Duque de Caxias)
—	DF	BRA	Ari (on loan to Guarani)
—	MF	BRA	Caíque (on loan to Avaí)
—	MF	BRA	Carlos Alberto (on loan to Bahia)
—	DF	BRA	Diogo (on loan to Sport do Recife)
—	DF	BRA	Edu Pina (on loan to Duque de Caxias)
—	DF	BRA	Élder Granja (on loan to São Caetano)
—	MF	BRA	Enrico (on loan to Ceará)
—	DF	BRA	Gian Mariano (on loan to Avaí)
—	DF	URU	Jadson Viera (on loan to Nacional)
—	MF	BRA	Jéferson (on loan to Sporting Kansas City)
—	MF	BRA	Jeferson Silva (on loan to Salgueiro)
—	FW	BRA	Lipe (on loan to Salgueiro)
—	MF	BRA	Magno (on loan to Bahia)
—	MF	BRA	Mateus (on loan to Criciúma)
—	FW	BRA	Nilson (on loan to Criciúma)
—	FW	BRA	Rafael Coelho (on loan to Avaí)
—	MF	BRA	Renato Augusto (on loan to Atlético Goianiense)
—	FW	BRA	Rodrigo Pimpão (on loan to Omiya Ardija)
—	GK	BRA	Tiago (on loan to Bahia)

=== Squad information ===
No.	Name	Nationality	Position (s)	Date of birth (age)	Signed From
Goalkeepers
1	Fernando Prass	(Brazil)	GK	9 July 1978 (aged 33)	(Portugal) União de Leiria
12	Alessandro	(Brazil)	GK	30 March 1988 (aged 23)	(Brazil) Grêmio
50	Diogo Silva (on loan from Nova Iguaçu)	(Brazil)	GK	8 July 1986 (aged 25)	(Brazil) Nova Iguaçu
Defenders
3	Cesinha	(Brazil)	CB	8 October 1986 (aged 25)	(Brazil) Santo André
13	Victor Ramos (on loan from Standard Liège)	(Brazil)	CB	5 May 1989 (aged 22)	(Belgium) Standard Liège
16	Douglas	(Brazil)	CB	30 October 1990 (aged 21)	(Brazil) América (Natal)
17	Julinho (on loan from Avaí)	(Brazil)	LFB, LWM	5 August 1986 (aged 25)	(Brazil) Avaí
22	Julio Irrazábal	(Paraguay)	RFB, LFB	25 November 1980 (aged 31)	(Paraguay) Cerro Porteño
23	Fagner	(Brazil)	RFB	11 June 1989 (aged 22)	(Netherlands) PSV Eindhoven
26	Dedé	(Brazil)	CB	1 July 1988 (aged 23)	(Brazil) Vasco da Gama (loaned from Volta Redonda)
32	Márcio Careca	(Brazil)	LFB	28 July 1978 (aged 33)	(Brazil) Guarani (loaned from Vasco da Gama)
33	Renato Silva (on loan from Shandong Luneng)	(Brazil)	CB	26 July 1983 (aged 28)	(China) Shandong Luneng
43	Max	(Brazil)	RFB, LFB	28 April 1990 (aged 21)	Youth system
Midfielders
5	Nílton	(Brazil)	DM, CM	21 April 1987 (aged 24)	(Brazil) Corinthians
6	Felipe	(Brazil)	CM, LWM, LW, AM, LFB	2 September 1977 (aged 34)	(Qatar) Al Sadd
8	Juninho Pernambucano	(Brazil)	CM, AM, RWM	30 January 1975 (aged 36)	(Qatar) Al-Gharafa
10	Diego Souza (on loan from Desportivo Brasil)	(Brazil)	AM, LW, CF	17 June 1985 (aged 26)	(Brazil) Atlético Mineiro (loaned from Desportivo Brasil)
18	Jumar (on loan from Desportivo Brasil)	(Brazil)	DM, LFB, CM, RFB	28 April 1986 (aged 25)	(Brazil) Palmeiras (loaned from Desportivo Brasil)
21	Fellipe Bastos (on loan from Benfica)	(Brazil)	CM, DM	1 February 1990 (aged 21)	(Switzerland) Servette (loaned from Benfica)
27	Diego Rosa	(Brazil)	CM, RFB, RWM, LWM, LFB, AM	22 March 1989 (aged 22)	(Brazil) Juventude
28	Eduardo Costa	(Brazil)	DM, CM	23 September 1982 (aged 29)	(Brazil) Vasco da Gama (loaned from Monaco)
31	Bernardo (on loan from Cruzeiro)	(Brazil)	AM, LW, LWM	20 May 1990 (aged 21)	(Brazil) Goiás (loaned from Cruzeiro)
35	Allan (youth player, on loan from Deportivo Maldonado)	(Brazil)	CM, RFB, DM, RWM	8 January 1991 (aged 20)	Youth system (on loan from Deportivo Maldonado)
37	Rômulo	(Brazil)	DM, CM	19 September 1990 (aged 21)	Youth system
45	Leandro Chaparro (on loan from Desportivo Brasil)	(Argentina)	CM, RWM, AM	7 January 1991 (aged 20)	(Argentina) San Lorenzo de Almagro
Forwards
7	Éder Luís (on loan from Benfica)	(Brazil)	RW, CF	19 April 1985 (aged 26)	(Portugal) Benfica
9	Alecsandro	(Brazil)	CF	4 February 1981 (aged 30)	(Brazil) Internacional
15	Jonathan (youth player)	(Brazil)	LW, RW, AM	11 May 1991 (aged 20)	Youth system
19	Leandro (on loan from Grêmio)	(Brazil)	RW, LW, CF	13 August 1980 (aged 31)	(Brazil) Grêmio
29	Kim	(Brazil)	RW, LW, CF	22 June 1980 (aged 31)	(Qatar) Al-Arabi
30	Patric	(Brazil)	CF	26 July 1987 (aged 24)	(Brazil) Mixto
39	Élton (on loan from Olé Brasil)	(Brazil)	CF	1 August 1985 (aged 26)	(Portugal) Braga (loaned from Olé Brasil)
44	William Barbio (on loan from Nova Iguaçu)	(Brazil)	RW, LW	22 October 1992 (aged 19)	(Brazil) Nova Iguaçu

==== from Vasco da Gama (U–20) ====
able to play in first team

No.	Name	Nationality	Position (s)	Date of birth (age)	Signed From
Midfielders
	Jeferson Silva	(Brazil)	AM	3 May 1990 (aged 21)	(Brazil) Salgueiro (loaned from Vasco da Gama)

No.	Name	Nationality	Position (s)	Date of birth (age)	Signed From
Defenders
2	Jomar (youth player)	(Brazil)	CB	28 September 1992 (aged 19)	Youth system
14	Luan (youth player)	(Brazil)	CB	10 May 1993 (aged 18)	Youth system
Midfielders
	Elivelton (youth player)	(Brazil)	DM	26 April 1992 (aged 19)	Youth system
	Guilherme (youth player)	(Brazil)	LWM, AM, RWM	31 March 1994 (aged 17)	Youth system
Forwards
	Willen (youth player)	(Brazil)	CF	10 January 1992 (aged 19)	Youth system

==== Out of loan ====
No.	Name	Nationality	Position (s)	Date of birth (age)	Signed From
Goalkeepers
	Adilson (on loan to Duque de Caxias)	(Brazil)	GK	24 February 1990 (aged 21)	(Brazil) Vasco da Gama – (U–20)
	Tiago (on loan to Bahia)	(Brazil)	GK	2 July 1983 (aged 28)	(Brazil) Vasco da Gama
Defenders
14	Jadson Viera (on loan to Nacional)	(Brazil)	CB	4 August 1981 (aged 30)	(Brazil) Vasco da Gama
34	Diogo (on loan to Sport do Recife)	(Brazil)	LFB, LWM	17 August 1992 (aged 19)	(Brazil) Vasco da Gama
	Ari (on loan to Guarani)	(Brazil)	RFB, LFB	6 August 1991 (aged 20)	(Brazil) Vasco da Gama – (U–20)
	Edu Pina (on loan to Duque de Caxias)	(Brazil)	LFB, LWM	23 January 1989 (aged 22)	(Brazil) Boavista (loaned from Vasco da Gama)
	Élder Granja (on loan to São Caetano)	(Brazil)	RFB	2 July 1982 (aged 29)	(Brazil) Vasco da Gama – (B)
	Genílson (on loan to Duque de Caxias)	(Brazil)	CB	27 October 1990 (aged 21)	(Brazil) Vasco da Gama – (U–20)
	Gian (on loan to Avaí)	(Brazil)	CB	2 July 1982 (aged 29)	(Brazil) São Caetano (loaned from Vasco da Gama)
Midfielders
11	Jéferson (on loan to Sporting Kansas City)	(Brazil)	AM, CM	15 July 1984 (aged 27)	(Brazil) Vasco da Gama
17	Enrico (on loan to Ceará)	(Brazil)	AM, RWM, LWM	4 May 1984 (aged 27)	(Brazil) Vasco da Gama
19	Carlos Alberto (on loan to Bahia)	(Brazil)	AM, LW, CF	11 December 1984 (aged 27)	(Brazil) Grêmio (loaned from Vasco da Gama)
20	Caíque (on loan to Avaí)	(Brazil)	AM, LW, RW, LWM, RWM	10 January 1987 (aged 24)	(Brazil) Vasco da Gama
28	Renato Augusto (on loan to Atlético Goianiense)	(Brazil)	CM, DM	17 July 1991 (aged 20)	(Brazil) Vasco da Gama
	Magno (on loan to Bahia)	(Brazil)	AM, LW, RW	20 May 1988 (aged 23)	(Brazil) Vasco da Gama
	Mateus (on loan to Criciúma)	(Brazil)	DM	18 May 1987 (aged 24)	(Saudi Arabia) Ettifaq (loaned from Vasco da Gama)
Forwards
29	Nilson (on loan to Criciúma)	(Brazil)	CF	6 April 1991 (aged 20)	(Brazil) Vasco da Gama
	Lipe (on loan to Salgueiro)	(Brazil)	CF	10 March 1990 (aged 21)	(Brazil) Duque de Caxias (loaned from Vasco da Gama)
	Rafael Coelho (on loan to Avaí)	(Brazil)	CF	20 May 1988 (aged 23)	(Brazil) Vasco da Gama
	Rodrigo Pimpão (on loan to Omiya Ardija)	(Brazil)	LW, RW	23 October 1987 (aged 24)	(Japan) Cerezo Osaka (loaned from Vasco da Gama)

=== Transfers ===
==== In ====
Date	Player	Number	Position	Previous club	Fee/notes	Ref
14 September 2010	(Brazil) Diego Rosa		MF	(Brazil) Juventude	Free transfer, end of contract	
17 March 2011	(Brazil) Alecsandro		FW	(Brazil) Internacional	Transfer, traded in an exchange of Zé Roberto	
27 April 2011	(Brazil) Juninho Pernambucano		MF	(Qatar) Al-Gharafa	Free transfer, end of contract	
8 July 2011	(Brazil) Eduardo Costa		MF	(France) Monaco	Free transfer, mutual contract rescission	
18 July 2011	(Brazil) Kim		FW	(Qatar) Al-Arabi	Free transfer, mutual contract rescission	

===== Loan in =====
Date from	Date to	Player	Number	Position	Previous club	Fee/notes	Ref
15 August 2008	27 May 2012	(Brazil) Allan		MF	(Brazil) Vasco da Gama U-20 (on loan from Deportivo Maldonado)	Loan transfer from Deportivo Maldonado; Previously end of loan: 30 June 2013	
8 December 2009	20 January 2012	(Brazil) Jumar		MF	(Brazil) Palmeiras (on loan from Desportivo Brasil)	Loan transfer from Desportivo Brasil; Previously end of loan: 31 December 2012	
28 June 2010	19 June 2012	(Brazil) Éder Luís		FW	(Portugal) Benfica	Loan transfer from Benfica	
28 June 2010	19 June 2012	(Brazil) Fellipe Bastos		MF	(Switzerland) Servette (on loan from Benfica)	Loan transfer from Benfica	
13 December 2010	27 August 2011	(Brazil) Anderson Martins		DF	(Brazil) Vitória	Loan transfer from Desportivo Brasil; Previously end of loan: 31 December 2014	
13 December 2010	11 March 2011	(Brazil) Marcel		FW	(Brazil) Santos (on loan from S.L. Benfica)	Loan transfer from S.L. Benfica; Previously end of loan: 31 December 2011	
30 December 2010	31 May 2011	(Brazil) Misael		FW	(Brazil) Ceará	Loan transfer from Ceará; Previously end of loan: 31 December 2011	
30 December 2010	8 July 2011	(Brazil) Eduardo Costa		MF	(France) AS Monaco	Loan transfer from AS Monaco; Previously end of loan: 31 December 2011	
27 January 2011	31 December 2011	(Brazil) Bernardo		MF	(Brazil) Cruzeiro	Loan transfer from Cruzeiro	
11 February 2011	31 December 2011	(Brazil) Leandro		FW	(Brazil) Grêmio	Loan transfer from Grêmio	
15 February 2011	31 December 2011	(Brazil) Élton		FW	(Portugal) Braga (on loan from Olé Brasil)	Loan transfer from Olé Brasil	
16 February 2011	31 December 2012	(Argentina) Leandro Chaparro		MF	(Argentina) San Lorenzo de Almagro	Loan transfer from Desportivo Brasil	
10 March 2011	20 July 2012	(Brazil) Diego Souza		MF	(Brazil) Atlético Mineiro (on loan from Desportivo Brasil)	Loan transfer from Desportivo Brasil; Previously end of loan: 31 December 2014	
2 May 2011	30 June 2012	(Brazil) Diogo Silva		GK	(Brazil) Nova Iguaçu	Loan transfer from Nova Iguaçu	
7 June 2011	31 December 2011	(Brazil) William Barbio		FW	(Brazil) Nova Iguaçu	Loan transfer from Nova Iguaçu	
4 July 2011	30 June 2013	(Brazil) Renato Silva		DF	(China) Shandong Luneng	Loan transfer from Shandong Luneng	
12 July 2011	31 December 2011	(Brazil) Julinho		DF	(Brazil) Avaí	Loan transfer from Avaí	
21 July 2011	31 December 2011	(Brazil) Victor Ramos		DF	(Belgium) Standard Liège	Loan transfer from Standard Liège	

==== Out ====
Date	Player	Number	Position	Destination club	Fee/notes	Ref
17 December 2010	(Brazil) Ernani		DF	(Brazil) Vitória	Released, end of contract	
21 January 2011	(Brazil) Zé Roberto		MF	(Brazil) Internacional	Transfer, traded in exchange of Alecsandro plus R$ 1,5 million	
30 May 2011	(Brazil) Cestaro		GK		Retired	
30 June 2011	(Brazil) Adilson		GK		Released, end of contract	
7 July 2011	(Brazil) Ramon		DF	(Brazil) Corinthians	Mutual contract rescission, free transfer	
5 August 2011	(Brazil) Fernando		DF	(Brazil) Americana	Free transfer, end of contract	
10 August 2011	(Brazil) Patrick Staduto		FW	(Portugal) 1º de Dezembro	Previously on Manhaçu on loan from Vasco da Gama; Free transfer	

===== Loan out =====
Date from	Date to	Player	Number	Position	Destination club	Fee/notes	Ref
3 May 2010	27 June 2011	(Brazil) Mateus		MF	(Saudi Arabia) Al-Ettifaq	Previously on Bahia on loan from Vasco da Gama (6 January 2010 to 3 May 2010)	
15 December 2010	30 June 2012	(Brazil) Magno		MF	(Brazil) Bahia	Loan transfer	
16 December 2010	31 December 2011	(Brazil) Tiago		GK	(Brazil) Bahia		
17 December 2010	31 December 2011	(Brazil) Gian		DF	(Brazil) Avaí	Previously on São Caetano on loan from Vasco da Gama	
19 December 2010	31 July 2011	(Brazil) Rodrigo Pimpão		FW	(Japan) Cerezo Osaka	Previously on Paraná on loan from Vasco da Gama	
30 December 2010	30 June 2011	(Brazil) Jeferson Silva		MF	(Brazil) Nova Iguaçu		
1 January 2011	30 June 2011	(Brazil) Lipe		FW	(Brazil) Duque de Caxias	Previously on Vasco da Gama – (U–20)	
14 January 2011	30 June 2011	(Brazil) Edu Pina		DF	(Brazil) Boavista		
10 January 2011	31 December 2011	(Brazil) Rafael Coelho		FW	(Brazil) Avaí		
2 February 2011	31 December 2011	(Brazil) Jadson Viera		DF	(Uruguay) Nacional		
4 February 2011	30 April 2011	(Brazil) Carlos Alberto		MF	(Brazil) Grêmio	Previously end of loan: 31 December 2011	
10 February 2011	31 December 2011	(Brazil) Adilson		GK	(Brazil) Duque de Caxias	Previously on Vasco da Gama – (U–20); Previously end of loan: 30 June 2011	
10 February 2011	30 June 2011	(Brazil) Ari		DF	(Brazil) Duque de Caxias	Previously on Vasco da Gama – (U–20)	
10 February 2011	31 December 2011	(Brazil) Genílson		DF	(Brazil) Duque de Caxias	Previously on Vasco da Gama – (U–20)	
12 April 2011	31 December 2011	(Brazil) Renato Augusto		MF	(Brazil) Atlético Goianiense		
23 May 2011	30 June 2012	(Brazil) Edu Pina		DF	(Brazil) Duque de Caxias	Previously on Boavista on loan from Vasco da Gama	
23 May 2011	31 December 2011	(Brazil) Jeferson Silva		MF	(Brazil) Salgueiro	Previously on Nova Iguaçu on loan from Vasco da Gama	
27 May 2011	31 December 2011	(Brazil) Carlos Alberto		MF	(Brazil) Bahia	Previously on Grêmio on loan from Vasco da Gama	
3 June 2011	31 December 2011	(Brazil) Lipe		FW	(Brazil) Salgueiro	Previously on Duque de Caxias on loan from Vasco da Gama	
10 June 2011	10 August 2011	(Brazil) Patrick Staduto		FW	(Brazil) Manhuaçu	Previously on Vasco da Gama – (U–20)	
14 June 2011	31 December 2011	(Brazil) Ari		DF	(Brazil) Guarani	Previously on Duque de Caxias on loan from Vasco da Gama	
27 June 2011	31 December 2011	(Brazil) Mateus		MF	(Brazil) Criciúma	Previously on Al-Ettifaq on loan from Vasco da Gama	
30 June 2011	31 December 2011	(Brazil) Enrico		MF	(Brazil) Ceará		
17 July 2011	31 December 2011	(Brazil) Jéferson		MF	(United States) Sporting Kansas City	Designated player	
25 July 2011	31 December 2011	(Brazil) Caíque		MF	(Brazil) Avaí		
29 July 2011	31 December 2011	(Brazil) Élder Granja		DF	(Brazil) São Caetano	Previously on Vasco da Gama – (B)	
2 August 2011	31 December 2011	(Brazil) Rodrigo Pimpão		FW	(Japan) Omiya Ardija	Previously on Cerezo Osaka on loan from Vasco da Gama	
14 September 2011	31 December 2012	(Brazil) Diogo		DF	(Brazil) Sport do Recife		
20 September 2011	31 December 2011	(Brazil) Nilson		FW	(Brazil) Criciúma		

== Statistics ==
=== Squad appearances and goals ===
Last updated on 4 December 2011.

- Players in italic have left the club during the season.

No.	Pos	Nat	Player	Total		Brasileirão Série A		Copa do Brasil		Rio de Janeiro State Championship		Other (Note: Includes appearances in Copa Sudamericana and friendlies.)	
No.	Pos	Nat	Player	Apps	Goals	Apps	Goals	Apps	Goals	Apps	Goals	Apps	Goals
Goalkeepers
1	GK	(Brazil) BRA	Fernando Prass	74	0	38	0	11	0	17	0	8	0
12	GK	(Brazil) BRA	Alessandro	0	0	0	0	0	0	0	0	0	0
50	GK	(Brazil) BRA	Diogo Silva	0	0	0	0	0	0	0	0	0	0
Defenders
3	DF	(Brazil) BRA	Cesinha	4	0	0	0	0	0	3+1	0	0	0
13	DF	(Brazil) BRA	Victor Ramos	8	0	4+2	0	0	0	0	0	0+2	0
16	DF	(Brazil) BRA	Douglas	9	1	2+2	0	0+1	0	1	0	3	1
17	DF	(Brazil) BRA	Julinho	13	0	8+1	0	0	0	0	0	4	0
22	DF	(Paraguay) PAR	Julio Irrazábal	2	0	0+1	0	0	0	1	0	0	0
23	DF	(Brazil) BRA	Fagner	56	5	35	4	1+3	0	9	1	7+1	0
26	DF	(Brazil) BRA	Dedé	60	11	30	5	11	1	15	3	4	2
32	DF	(Brazil) BRA	Márcio Careca	30	0	14+1	0	3+3	0	3+3	0	1+2	0
33	DF	(Brazil) BRA	Renato Silva	26	0	20	0	0	0	0	0	6	0
43	DF	(Brazil) BRA	Max	4	0	2+1	0	0	0	0+1	0	0	0
Midfielders
5	MF	(Brazil) BRA	Nílton	12	0	5+2	0	0	0	0	0	5	0
6	MF	(Brazil) BRA	Felipe	47	7	19+1	4	10	0	14+1	3	1+1	0
8	MF	(Brazil) BRA	Juninho Pernambucano	26	5	19+2	4	0	0	0	0	5	1
10	MF	(Brazil) BRA	Diego Souza	52	18	30+2	11	9	4	5	2	6	1
18	MF	(Brazil) BRA	Jumar	38	1	22+4	0	2+4	0	0+1	0	4+1	1
21	MF	(Brazil) BRA	Fellipe Bastos	39	3	12+5	1	6+1	1	7+2	1	4+2	0
27	MF	(Brazil) BRA	Diego Rosa	15	0	2+9	0	0	0	0	0	3+1	0
28	MF	(Brazil) BRA	Eduardo Costa	35	0	15+3	0	6+2	0	8+1	0	0	0
31	MF	(Brazil) BRA	Bernardo	55	17	5+22	6	4+6	2	5+5	6	6+2	3
35	MF	(Brazil) BRA	Allan	44	1	11+6	0	10	0	10	0	4+3	1
37	MF	(Brazil) BRA	Rômulo	61	5	32	1	8	1	17	3	4	0
45	MF	(Argentina) ARG	Leandro Chaparro	4	0	0+4	0	0	0	0	0	0	0
Forwards
7	FW	(Brazil) BRA	Éder Luís	60	8	32	4	10	1	17	3	1	0
9	FW	(Brazil) BRA	Alecsandro	39	13	18+3	3	8	5	4+1	2	3+2	3
15	FW	(Brazil) BRA	Jonathan	1	0	0	0	0	0	0	0	1	0
19	FW	(Brazil) BRA	Leandro	29	1	2+11	0	0+2	0	1+6	0	3+4	1
29	FW	(Brazil) BRA	Kim	2	0	0+2	0	0	0	0	0	0	0
30	FW	(Brazil) BRA	Patric	6	0	0	0	0	0	0+4	0	1+1	0
39	FW	(Brazil) BRA	Élton	43	15	17+10	11	1+3	1	2+5	1	4+1	2
44	FW	(Brazil) BRA	William Barbio	0	0	0	0	0	0	0	0	0	0
Players of youth squads who have made an appearance or had a squad number this season
2	DF	(Brazil) BRA	Jomar	3	0	3	0	0	0	0	0	0	0
14	DF	(Brazil) BRA	Luan	0	0	0	0	0	0	0	0	0	0
	MF	(Brazil) BRA	Elivelton										
	MF	(Brazil) BRA	Guilherme										
	FW	(Brazil) BRA	Willen										
Players who have made an appearance or had a squad number this season but have transferred or loaned out during the season
10	MF	(Brazil) BRA	Zé Roberto	0	0	0	0	0	0	0	0	0	0
14	DF	(Brazil) BRA	Jadson Viera	0	0	0	0	0	0	0	0	0	0
19	MF	(Brazil) BRA	Carlos Alberto	3	0	0	0	0	0	3	0	0	0
28	MF	(Brazil) BRA	Renato Augusto										
9	FW	(Brazil) BRA	Marcel	9	6	0	0	1	2	8	4	0	0
	FW	(Brazil) BRA	Patrick Staduto										
36	GK	(Brazil) BRA	Cestaro	0	0	0	0	0	0	0	0	0	0
40	FW	(Brazil) BRA	Misael	4	0	0+1	0	0	0	1+2	0	0	0
17	MF	(Brazil) BRA	Enrico	12	3	2+2	1	0+2	0	0+6	2	0	0
33	DF	(Brazil) BRA	Ramon	24	2	1+1	0	8	0	14	2	0	0
11	MF	(Brazil) BRA	Jéferson	14	4	3+1	1	1	1	5+4	2	0	0
20	MF	(Brazil) BRA	Caíque	5	1	0	0	0+1	0	1+3	1	0	0
13	DF	(Brazil) BRA	Élder Granja										
4	DF	(Brazil) BRA	Fernando	5	0	3	0	0	0	1+1	0	0	0
25	DF	(Brazil) BRA	Anderson Martins	40	1	14	0	11	0	14	1	1	0
29	FW	(Brazil) BRA	Nilson	0	0	0	0	0	0	0	0	0	0
34	DF	(Brazil) BRA	Diogo	0	0	0	0	0	0	0	0	0	0

=== Top scorers ===
Includes all competitive matches

Position	Nation	Number	Name	Rio de Janeiro State Championship	Copa do Brasil	Copa Sudamericana	Brasileirão Série A	Total
1	(Brazil)	31	Bernardo	6	2	4	6	18
2	(Brazil)	10	Diego Souza	1	3	2	11	17
3	(Brazil)	39	Élton	1	1	2	11	15
4	(Brazil)	9	Alecsandro	2	5	3	3	13
5	(Brazil)	26	Dedé	3	1	2	6	12
6	(Brazil)	7	Éder Luís	3	2	0	4	9
7	(Brazil)	6	Felipe	3	0	0	4	7
8	(Brazil)	9	Marcel	4	2	0	0	6
9	(Brazil)	23	Fagner	1	0	0	4	5
9	(Brazil)	8	Juninho Pernambucano	0	0	1	4	5
9	(Brazil)	37	Rômulo	3	1	0	1	5
12	(Brazil)	11	Jéferson	2	1	0	1	4
13	(Brazil)	17	Enrico	2	0	0	1	3
13	(Brazil)	21	Fellipe Bastos	1	1	0	1	3
15	(Brazil)	33	Ramon	2	0	0	0	2
16	(Brazil)	35	Allan	0	0	1	0	1
16	(Brazil)	25	Anderson Martins	1	0	0	0	1
16	(Brazil)	20	Caíque	1	0	0	0	1
16	(Brazil)	16	Douglas	0	0	1	0	1
16	(Brazil)	18	Jumar	0	0	1	0	1
16	(Brazil)	19	Leandro	0	0	1	0	1
			Own Goal	0	1	0	0	1
			Total	36	20	18	57	131

=== Clean sheets ===
Includes all competitive matches

Position	Nation	Number	Name	Rio de Janeiro State Championship	Copa do Brasil	Copa Sudamericana	Brazilian Série A	Total
GK	(Brazil)	1	Fernando Prass	8	5	1	16	30
GK	(Brazil)	12	Alessandro	0	0	0	0	0
GK	(Brazil)	24	Diogo Silva	0	0	0	0	0
GK	(Brazil)	36	Cestaro	0	0	0	0	0
			Total	8	5	1	16	30

=== Overall ===
Games played	74 (17 Rio State League, 11 Copa do Brasil, 8 Copa Sudamericana, 38 Série A)
Games won	35 (8 Rio State League, 5 Copa do Brasil, 3 Copa Sudamericana, 19 Série A)
Games drawn	22 (4 Rio State League, 5 Copa do Brasil, 1 Copa Sudamericana, 12 Série A)
Games lost	16 (5 Rio State League, 1 Copa do Brasil, 4 Copa Sudamericana, 7 Série A)
Goals scored	131
Goals conceded	77
Goal difference	+54
Best result	9-0 (A) v America-RJ – Rio State League – 2011
Worsts results	0-4 (A) v Botafogo / 1-5 (A) v Coritiba – Série A – 2011
Most appearances	Fernando Prass (74 appearances)
Top scorer	Bernardo (18 goals)

Last updated: 4 December
Source: SuperVasco.com

== Competitions ==
=== Pre-season friendlies ===
15 January	Vasco da Gama (Brazil)	1–0	(Paraguay) Cerro Porteño	Rio de Janeiro
17:00 UTC−02:00	Anderson Martins 75'			Stadium: Estádio São Januário; Attendance: N/A; Referee: Gutemberg de Paula Fonseca

=== Rio de Janeiro State Championship ===
==== Guanabara Cup ====
Pos	Team	Pld	W	D	L	GF	GA	GD	Pts	Qualification
1	Flamengo	7	7	0	0	14	4	+10	21	Advanced to the Semifinals
2	Boavista	7	4	1	2	15	11	+4	13	Advanced to the Semifinals
3	Resende	7	4	1	2	9	5	+4	13	Advanced to the Troféu Washington Rodrigues
4	Nova Iguaçu	7	3	2	2	12	11	+1	11	Advanced to the Troféu Washington Rodrigues
5	Vasco da Gama	7	2	1	4	16	9	+7	7	
6	Volta Redonda	7	1	2	4	4	7	−3	5	
7	Americano	7	1	2	4	7	14	−7	5	
8	America	7	1	1	5	6	22	−16	4	

Updated to match(es) played on 13 February. Source:
Rules for classification: 1 points; 2 wins; 3 goal difference; 4 goals scored; 5 red cards received; 6 yellow cards received; 7 draw

===== Matches =====
19 January	Vasco da Gama	0–1	Resende	Rio de Janeiro
19:00 UTC−02:00			Alexsandro 86'	Stadium: Estádio São Januário; Attendance: 6,305; Referee: Felipe Gomes da Silva

23 January	Nova Iguaçu	3–2	Vasco da Gama	Volta Redonda
17:00 UTC−02:00	Alex Moraes 3'; Maycon 18'; William Barbio 78'		Rômulo 52'; Marcel 59' (pen.)	Stadium: Estádio Raulino de Oliveira; Attendance: 2,162; Referee: Rodrigo Nunes de Sá

27 January	Boavista	3–1	Vasco da Gama	Rio de Janeiro
17:00 UTC−02:00	Tony 18'; Frontini 26'; Erick Flores 88'		Marcel 56'	Stadium: Estádio Olímpico João Havelange; Attendance: N/A; Referee: João Batista de Arruda

30 January	Vasco da Gama	1 – 2	Flamengo	Rio de Janeiro
19:00 UTC−02:00	Rômulo 75'		Deivid 22'; Thiago Neves 43'	Stadium: Estádio Olímpico João Havelange; Attendance: N/A; Referee: Marcelo de Lima Henrique

3 February	Vasco da Gama	0–0	Volta Redonda	Rio de Janeiro
19:00 UTC−02:00				Stadium: Estádio São Januário; Attendance: N/A; Referee: Djalma Beltrami

6 February	Vasco da Gama	3–0	Americano	Rio de Janeiro
19:00 UTC−02:00	Marcel 35'; Dedé 53'; Jéferson 79'			Stadium: Estádio São Januário; Attendance: 1,171; Referee: Pathrice Maia

12 February	America (RJ)	0–9	Vasco da Gama	Volta Redonda
19:00 UTC−02:00			Fagner 4'; Felipe 18'; Ramon 23', 63'; Marcel 25'; Enrico 37', 89'; Caíque 50'; Jéferson 69'	Stadium: Estádio Raulino de Oliveira; Attendance: N/A; Referee: Wagner do Santos Rosa

==== Rio Cup ====
Pos	Team	Pld	W	D	L	GF	GA	GD	Pts	Qualification
1	Vasco da Gama	8	5	2	1	19	10	+9	17	Advanced to the Semifinals
2	Flamengo	8	4	4	0	13	7	+6	16	Advanced to the Semifinals
3	Americano	8	4	2	2	10	14	−4	14	Advanced to the Troféu Carlos Alberto Torres
4	Boavista	8	4	1	3	13	8	+5	13	Advanced to the Troféu Carlos Alberto Torres
5	Volta Redonda	8	3	2	3	11	12	−1	11	
6	Resende	8	2	2	4	12	12	0	8	
7	Nova Iguaçu	8	2	1	5	7	12	−5	7	
8	America	8	1	1	6	7	15	−8	4	

Updated to match(es) played on 9 April. Source:
Rules for classification: 1 points; 2 wins; 3 goal difference; 4 goals scored; 5 red cards received; 6 yellow cards received; 7 draw

===== Matches =====
4 March	Macaé	3–1	Vasco da Gama	Macaé
19:30 UTC−03:00	Luís Mário 33'; Diogo Siston 39'; Bill 90'		Élton 90'	Stadium: Estádio Cláudio Moacyr de Azevedo; Attendance: N/A; Referee: Péricles Bassols

9 March	Vasco da Gama	4–2	Duque de Caxias	Rio de Janeiro
22:00 UTC−03:00	Felipe 9'; Anderson Martins 36'; Bernardo 44'; Dedé 78'		Somália 50'; Ari 73'	Stadium: Estádio São Januário; Attendance: 9,582; Referee: Eduardo Cordeiro Guimarães

13 March	Madureira	2–4	Vasco da Gama	Volta Redonda
16:00 UTC−03:00	Rodrigo 63'; Adriano Magrão 82'		Bernardo 39', 68', 87'; Fellipe Bastos 90'	Stadium: Estádio Raulino de Oliveira; Attendance: 3,857; Referee: Wagner do Nascimento Magalhães

20 March	Vasco da Gama	2–0	Botafogo	Rio de Janeiro
18:00 UTC−03:00	Diego Souza 58'; Éder Luís 70'			Stadium: Estádio Olímpico João Havelange; Attendance: 31,265; Referee: Péricles Bassols

27 March	Fluminense	0–0	Vasco da Gama	Rio de Janeiro
18:00 UTC−03:00				Stadium: Estádio Olímpico João Havelange; Attendance: 27,480; Referee: Felipe Gomes da Silva

3 April	Vasco da Gama	4–0	Bangu	Rio de Janeiro
16:00 UTC−03:00	Dedé 40'; Éder Luís 47'; Alecsandro 72'; Felipe 74'			Stadium: Estádio São Januário; Attendance: 12,707; Referee: Grazianni Maciel Rocha

9 April	Vasco da Gama	2–1	Cabofriense	Rio de Janeiro
18:00 UTC−03:00	Bernardo 20'; Alecsandro 86'		Zotti 34'	Stadium: Estádio São Januário; Attendance: 18,081; Referee: Antonio Frederico Maciel dos Santos

17 April	Olaria	2–2	Vasco da Gama	Macaé
16:00 UTC−03:00	Waldir 17'; Felipe Silva 50'		Bernardo 62' (pen.); Rômulo 90+1'	Stadium: Estádio Cláudio Moacyr de Azevedo; Attendance: 4,619; Referee: Felipe Gomes da Silva

==== Knockout stage matches ====
23 April Semifinal	Vasco da Gama	1–0	Olaria	Rio de Janeiro
18:00 UTC−03:00	Éder Luís 37'			Stadium: Estádio Olímpico João Havelange; Attendance: 28,675; Referee: Pathrice Maia

1 May Final	Vasco da Gama	0–0 (1–3 p)	Flamengo	Rio de Janeiro
16:00 UTC−03:00				Stadium: Estádio Olímpico João Havelange; Attendance: 39,029; Referee: Luiz Antônio Silva dos Santos
	Penalties
	(penalty scored) Alecsandro; (penalty missed) Bernardo; (penalty missed) Fellipe Bastos; (penalty missed) Élton		Renato (penalty scored); Gonzalo Fierro (penalty missed); Fernando (penalty scored); Thiago Neves (penalty scored)

=== Copa do Brasil ===
==== Matches ====
23 February First Phase	Comercial (MS)	1–6	Vasco da Gama	Campo Grande
22:00 UTC−03:00	Anderson 62' (pen.)	Report	Bastos 2'; Marcel 16' (pen.), 24'; Jéferson 45'; Éder Luís 57'; Rômulo 66'	Stadium: Estádio Universitário Pedro Pedrossian; Attendance: N/A; Referee: Antônio Denival de Morais (Paraná)

30 March Round of 32: Leg 1	ABC	0–0	Vasco da Gama	Natal
22:00 UTC−03:00		Report		Stadium: Estádio Maria Lamas Farache; Attendance: N/A; Referee: João Bosco Sátiro da Nóbrega (Paraíba)

30 March Round of 32: Leg 2	Vasco da Gama	2–1 (2–1 agg.)	ABC	Rio de Janeiro
22:00 UTC−03:00	Alecsandro 49' (pen.); Bernardo 77'	Report	Cascata 18'	Stadium: Estádio São Januário; Attendance: 18,009; Referee: Emerson de Almeida Ferreira (Minas Gerais)

13 April Round of 16: Leg 1	Náutico	0–3	Vasco da Gama	Recife
22:00 UTC−03:00		Report	Dedé 32'; Alecsandro 51'; Bernardo 90+2'	Stadium: Estádio Eládio de Barros Carvalho; Attendance: 12,244; Referee: Célio Amorim (Santa Catarina)

27 April Round of 16: Leg 2	Vasco da Gama	0–0 (3–0 agg.)	Náutico	Rio de Janeiro
22:00 UTC−03:00		Report		Stadium: Estádio São Januário; Attendance: 5,557; Referee: Devarly Lira do Rosario (Espírito Santo)

4 May Quarterfinals: Leg 1	Atlético Paranaense	2–2	Vasco da Gama	Curitiba
22:00 UTC−03:00	Guerrón 51'; Baier 88' (pen.)	Report	Alecsandro 36'; Diego Souza 73'	Stadium: Arena Joaquim Américo Guimarães; Attendance: 17,523; Referee: Wilton Sampaio (Distrito Federal)

12 May Quarterfinals: Leg 2	Vasco da Gama	1–1 (3–3 (a) agg.)	Atlético Paranaense	Rio de Janeiro
19:00 UTC−03:00	Élton 79'	Report	Nieto 73'	Stadium: Estádio São Januário; Attendance: 21,206; Referee: Elmo Alves Resende Cunha (Goiás)

18 May Semifinals: Leg 1	Vasco da Gama	1–1	Avaí	Rio de Janeiro
22:00 UTC−03:00	Diego Souza 90+3' (pen.)	Report	Julinho 80'	Stadium: Estádio São Januário; Attendance: 19,136; Referee: Wilson Luiz Seneme (São Paulo)

25 May Semifinals: Leg 2	Avaí	0–2 (1–3 agg.)	Vasco da Gama	Florianópolis
22:00 UTC−03:00		Report	Revson 2' (o.g.); Diego Souza 34'	Stadium: Estádio Aderbal Ramos da Silva; Attendance: 19,920; Referee: Leandro Pedro Vuaden (Rio Grande do Sul)

1 June Finals: Leg 1	Vasco da Gama	1 – 0	Coritiba	Rio de Janeiro
22:00 UTC−03:00	Alecsandro 50'	Report		Stadium: Estádio São Januário; Attendance: 21,365; Referee: Paulo César de Oliveira (São Paulo)

8 June Finals: Leg 2	Coritiba	3 – 2 (3–3 (a) agg.)	Vasco da Gama	Curitiba
22:00 UTC−03:00	Bill 28'; Davi 44'; Willian 66'	Report	Alecsandro 11'; Éder Luís 57'	Stadium: Estádio Major Antônio Couto Pereira; Attendance: 35,142; Referee: Sálvio Fagundes (São Paulo)

Copa do Brasil
2011 champion

1st title

=== Brasileirão Série A ===
==== Standings ====
Pos	Team	Pld	W	D	L	GF	GA	GD	Pts	Qualification or relegation
1	Corinthians (C)	38	21	8	9	53	36	+17	71	2012 Copa Libertadores Second Stage
2	Vasco da Gama	38	19	12	7	57	40	+17	69	2012 Copa Libertadores Second Stage (Note: Vasco da Gama is qualified for the second stage of the 2012 Copa Libertadores as the 2011 Copa do Brasil champion.)
3	Fluminense	38	20	3	15	60	51	+9	63	2012 Copa Libertadores Second Stage
4	Flamengo	38	15	16	7	59	47	+12	61	2012 Copa Libertadores First Stage
5	Internacional	38	16	12	10	57	43	+14	60	2012 Copa Libertadores First Stage

Rules for classification: 1st points; 2nd wins; 3rd goal difference; 4th goals scored; 5th head-to-head results; 6th least red cards received; 7th least yellow cards received; 8th draw
(C) Champions

==== Results summary ====
Overall								Home						Away					
Pld	W	D	L	GF	GA	GD	Pts	W	D	L	GF	GA	GD	W	D	L	GF	GA	GD
38	19	12	7	57	40	+17	69	11	7	1	32	12	+20	8	5	6	25	28	−3

Last updated: 2011-12-04.
Source: Série A 2011

Pld=Matches played; W=Matches won; D=Matches drawn; L=Matches lost;

==== Results by round ====
Round	1	2	3	4	5	6	7	8	9	10	11	12	13	14	15	16	17	18	19	20	21	22	23	24	25	26	27	28	29	30	31	32	33	34	35	36	37	38
Ground	A	H	A	H	A	A	H	A	H	H	A	H	A	H	A	H	A	H	A	H	A	H	A	H	H	A	H	A	A	H	A	H	A	H	A	H	A	H
Result	W	W	L	D	D	W	L	L	W	W	W	D	W	W	L	W	W	D	D	W	L	W	D	W	D	W	D	L	D	W	W	D	L	W	D	W	W	D
Position	3	1	7	7	7	5	9	11	7	5	4	5	5	4	4	4	4	4	4	2	3	3	2	1	1	1	1	2	2	2	1	2	2	2	2	2	2	2

Updated to match(es) played on 4 December. Source: Matches
A = Away; H = Home; W = Win; D = Draw; L = Loss

==== Matches ====
21 May Matchday 1	Ceará	1–3	Vasco da Gama	Fortaleza
18:30 (UTC−03:00)	Cléber 66'	Report; Report	Bernardo 78', 80'; Jéferson 90'	Stadium: Estádio Presidente Vargas; Attendance: N/A; Referee: Jailson Macedo Freitas

29 May Matchday 2	Vasco da Gama	3–0	América (MG)	Rio de Janeiro
18:30 (UTC−03:00)	Bernardo 11' (pen.); Enrico 48'; Élton 77'	Report; Report		Stadium: Estádio São Januário; Attendance: 4,495; Referee: Francisco Carlos Nascimento

5 June Matchday 3	Coritiba	5–1	Vasco da Gama	Curitiba
16:00 (UTC−03:00)	Tcheco 3'; Anderson Aquino 11', 15', 20'; Maranhão 65'	Report; Report	Élton 68'	Stadium: Estádio Major Antônio Couto Pereira; Attendance: 18,554; Referee: Célio Amorim

11 June Matchday 4	Vasco da Gama	1–1	Figueirense	Rio de Janeiro
18:30 (UTC−03:00)	Élton 18'	Report; Report	Aloísio 90'	Stadium: Estádio São Januário; Attendance: 17,777; Referee: Luiz Flávio de Oliveira

19 June Matchday 5	Grêmio	1–1	Vasco da Gama	Porto Alegre
16:00 (UTC−03:00)	Roberson 85'	Report; Report	Bernardo 77'	Stadium: Estádio Olímpico Monumental; Attendance: N/A; Referee: André Luiz de Freitas Castro

26 June Matchday 6	Atlético Goianiense	0–1	Vasco da Gama	Goiânia
18:30 (UTC−03:00)		Report; Report	Felipe 1'	Stadium: Estádio Serra Dourada; Attendance: 11,959 (paying); Referee: Antônio Hora Filho

29 June Matchday 7	Vasco da Gama	0–3	Cruzeiro	Rio de Janeiro
19:30 (UTC−03:00)		Report; Report	Leandro Guerreiro 55'; Montillo 89'; Roger 90+2' (pen.)	Stadium: Estádio São Januário; Attendance: 7,695; Referee: Arilson Bispo da Anunciação

6 July Matchday 8	Corinthians	2–1	Vasco da Gama	São Paulo
21:50 (UTC−03:00)	Ralf 22'; Paulinho 43'	Report; Report	Juninho Pernambucano 3'	Stadium: Estádio Municipal Paulo Machado de Carvalho; Attendance: 28,453 (paying); Referee: Leandro Pedro Vuaden

9 July Matchday 9	Vasco da Gama	2–0	Internacional	Rio de Janeiro
18:30 (UTC−03:00)	Éder Luís 25'; Dedé 83'	Report; Report		Stadium: Estádio São Januário; Attendance: 8,731 (paying); Referee: Jailson Macedo Freitas

16 July Matchday 10	Vasco da Gama	2–1	Atlético Paranaense	Rio de Janeiro
19:30 (UTC−03:00)	Alecsandro 45+3', 71'	Report; Report	Kléberson 10'	Stadium: Estádio São Januário; Attendance: 9,775 (paying); Referee: Alicio Pena Júnior

24 July Matchday 11	Atlético Mineiro	1–2	Vasco da Gama	Ipatinga
16:00 (UTC−03:00)	Magno Alves 41'	Report; Report	Diego Souza 18', 90+2' (pen.)	Stadium: Estádio Municipal Epaminondas Mendes Brito; Attendance: 16,006; Referee: Edivaldo Elias da Silva

28 July Matchday 12	Vasco da Gama	1–1	Bahia	Rio de Janeiro
19:30 (UTC−03:00)	Élton 90+5'	Report; Report	Reinaldo 5'	Stadium: Estádio São Januário; Attendance: 15,122 (paying); Referee: Sandro Meira Ricci

31 July Matchday 13	São Paulo	0–2	Vasco da Gama	São Paulo
16:00 (UTC−03:00)		Report; Report	Éder Luís 53'; Felipe 90+3'	Stadium: Estádio Cícero Pompeu de Toledo; Attendance: N/A; Referee: Paulo Henrique de Godoy Bezerra

3 August Matchday 14	Vasco da Gama	2–0	Santos	Rio de Janeiro
21:50 (UTC−03:00)	Diego Souza 3'; Dedé 21'	Report; Report		Stadium: Estádio São Januário; Attendance: 14,522 (paying); Referee: Héber Roberto Lopes

7 August Matchday 15	Botafogo	4–0	Vasco da Gama	Rio de Janeiro
18:30 (UTC−03:00)	Antônio Carlos 10'; Abreu 28', 40'; Herrera 90+2'	Report; Report		Stadium: Estádio Olímpico João Havelange; Attendance: N/A; Referee: Marcelo de Lima Henrique

14 August Matchday 16	Vasco da Gama	1–0	Palmeiras	Rio de Janeiro
16:00 (UTC−03:00)	Bernardo 81'	Report; Report		Stadium: Estádio São Januário; Attendance: 10,826; Referee: Márcio Chagas da Silva

17 August Matchday 17	Avaí	0–2	Vasco da Gama	Florianópolis
21:50 (UTC−03:00)		Report; Report	Diego Souza 27'; Dedé 67'	Stadium: Estádio Aderbal Ramos da Silva; Attendance: N/A; Referee: Cleber Wellington Abade

21 August Matchday 18	Vasco da Gama	1–1	Fluminense	Rio de Janeiro
18:30 (UTC−03:00)	Juninho Pernambucano 37' (pen.)	Report; Report	Rafael Moura 61'	Stadium: Estádio Olímpico João Havelange; Attendance: 16,991; Referee: Marcelo de Lima Henrique

28 August Matchday 19	Flamengo	0 – 0	Vasco da Gama	Rio de Janeiro
16:00 (UTC−03:00)		Report; Report		Stadium: Estádio Olímpico João Havelange; Attendance: 33,206; Referee: Péricles Bassols

31 August Matchday 20	Vasco da Gama	3–1	Ceará	Rio de Janeiro
18:00 (UTC−03:00)	Élton 52', 65'; Éder Luís 62'	Report; Report	Washington 64'	Stadium: Estádio São Januário; Attendance: 3,468 (paying); Referee: Emerson Almeida Ferreira

4 September Matchday 21	América (MG)	4–1	Vasco da Gama	Sete Lagoas
18:00 (UTC−03:00)	André Dias 20', 86'; Kempes 43' (pen.); Marcos Rocha 59'	Report; Report	Juninho Pernambucano 22'	Stadium: Arena Joaquim Henrique Nogueira; Attendance: 2,644 (paying); Referee: Sandro Meira Ricci

8 September Matchday 22	Vasco da Gama	2–0	Coritiba	Rio de Janeiro
20:30 (UTC−03:00)	Juninho Pernambucano 29'; Rômulo 55'	Report; Report		Stadium: Estádio São Januário; Attendance: 9,397; Referee: Jefferson Schmidt

11 September Matchday 23	Figueirense	1–1	Vasco da Gama	Florianópolis
16:00 (UTC−03:00)	Wellington Nem 5'	Report; Report	Fagner 17'	Stadium: Estádio Orlando Scarpelli; Attendance: N/A; Referee: Nielson Nogueira Dias

17 September Matchday 24	Vasco da Gama	4–0	Grêmio	Rio de Janeiro
18:00 (UTC−03:00)	Élton 4'; Diego Souza 34'; Éder Luís 52'; Fagner 62'	Report; Report		Stadium: Estádio São Januário; Attendance: 19,757; Referee: Ricardo Marques Ribeiro

22 September Matchday 25	Vasco da Gama	1–1	Atlético Goianiense	Rio de Janeiro
20:30 (UTC−03:00)	Diego Souza 33'	Report; Report	Anselmo 23'	Stadium: Estádio São Januário; Attendance: 18,132 (paying); Referee: Evandro Roman

25 September Matchday 26	Cruzeiro	0–3	Vasco da Gama	Sete Lagoas
16:00 (UTC−03:00)		Report; Report	Diego Souza 40', 60', 81'	Stadium: Arena Joaquim Henrique Nogueira; Attendance: N/A; Referee: Fabrício Neves Corrêa

2 October Matchday 27	Vasco da Gama	2–2	Corinthians	Rio de Janeiro
16:00 (UTC−03:00)	Dedé 16'; Fagner 45+2'	Report; Report	Alex 21'; Danilo 67'	Stadium: Estádio São Januário; Attendance: 22,855; Referee: Sandro Meira Ricci

9 October Matchday 28	Internacional	3–0	Vasco da Gama	Porto Alegre
16:00 (UTC−03:00)	D'Alessandro 49'; Índio 77'; Tinga 90'	Report; Report		Stadium: Estádio José Pinheiro Borda; Attendance: N/A; Referee: Alício Pena Júnior

13 October Matchday 29	Atlético Paranaense	2–2	Vasco da Gama	Curitiba
20:30 (UTC−03:00)	Paulo Baier 16'; García 24'	Report; Report	Élton 66', 82'	Stadium: Arena Joaquim Américo Guimarães; Attendance: N/A; Referee: Paulo Henrique Godoy

16 October Matchday 30	Vasco da Gama	2–0	Atlético Mineiro	Rio de Janeiro
18:00 (UTC−02:00)	Élton 3'; Fagner 19'	Report; Report		Stadium: Estádio São Januário; Attendance: 15,269; Referee: Fabrício Neves Correa

23 October Matchday 31	Bahia	0–2	Vasco da Gama	Salvador
15:00 (UTC−03:00)		Report; Report	Felipe 23'; Diego Souza 90+2'	Stadium: Estádio Metropolitano Roberto Santos; Attendance: N/A; Referee: Wilton Sampaio

30 October Matchday 32	Vasco da Gama	0–0	São Paulo	Rio de Janeiro
16:00 (UTC−02:00)		Report; Report		Stadium: Estádio São Januário; Attendance: 23,468 (paying); Referee: Ricardo Marques Ribeiro

6 November Matchday 33	Santos	2–0	Vasco da Gama	Santos
17:00 (UTC−02:00)	Neymar 4'; Borges 74'	Report; Report		Stadium: Estádio Urbano Caldeira

13 November Matchday 34	Vasco da Gama	2–0	Botafogo	Rio de Janeiro
19:00 (UTC−02:00)	Fellipe Bastos 16'; Dedé 60'	Report; Report		Stadium: Estádio Olímpico João Havelange; Attendance: 33,778; Referee: Antônio Schneider

16 November Matchday 35	Palmeiras	1–1	Vasco da Gama	São Paulo
21:50 (UTC−02:00)	Luan 63'	Report; Report	Dedé 4'	Stadium: Estádio Municipal Paulo Machado de Carvalho; Referee: Leandro Vuaden

19 November Matchday 36	Vasco da Gama	2–0	Avaí	Rio de Janeiro
19:00 (UTC−02:00)	Felipe 51'; Élton 66'	Report; Report		Stadium: Estádio São Januário; Attendance: 19,834; Referee: Fabrício Neves Correa

27 November Matchday 37	Fluminense	1–2	Vasco da Gama	Rio de Janeiro
17:00 (UTC−02:00)	Fred 84'	Report; Report	Alecsandro 77'; Bernardo 90+1'	Stadium: Estádio Olímpico João Havelange; Referee: Marcelo de Lima Henrique

4 December Matchday 38	Vasco da Gama	1 – 1	Flamengo	Rio de Janeiro
17:00 (UTC−02:00)	Diego Souza 30'	Report; Report	Renato Abreu 55'	Stadium: Estádio Olímpico João Havelange; Referee: Péricles Bassols

=== Copa Sudamericana ===
==== Squad ====
As of 23 November 2011, according to combined sources on the official website.
In Conmebol competitions players must be assigned numbers between 1 and 25.

Note: Flags indicate national team as defined under FIFA eligibility rules; some limited exceptions apply. Players may hold more than one non-FIFA nationality.

No.	Pos.	Nation	Player
1	GK	BRA	Fernando Prass (third captain)
2	MF	BRA	Allan
3	DF	BRA	Renato Silva
4	DF	BRA	Dedé (vice-captain)
5	MF	ARG	Leandro Chaparro²
6	MF	BRA	Felipe³
7	MF	BRA	Rômulo³
8	MF	BRA	Juninho Pernambucano (captain)
9	FW	BRA	Alecsandro
10	MF	BRA	Diego Souza
11	FW	BRA	Élton
12	GK	BRA	Alessandro
13	FW	BRA	Kim²

No.	Pos.	Nation	Player
14	FW	BRA	Jonathan
15	MF	BRA	Nílton¹ ³
16	MF	BRA	Bernardo
17	DF	BRA	Julinho
18	MF	BRA	Jumar
19	FW	BRA	Leandro
20	MF	BRA	Diego Rosa
21	MF	BRA	Fellipe Bastos
22	FW	BRA	Patric¹
23	DF	BRA	Fagner
24	GK	BRA	Diogo Silva
25	DF	BRA	Douglas¹

¹ – Nílton replaced Felipe, Patric replaced Kim and Douglas replaced Anderson Martins after the Second Phase.
² – Leandro Chaparro replaced Rômulo and Kim replaced Victor Ramos after the Round of 16.
³ – Rômulo replaced Éder Luís, Felipe replaced Nílton and Nílton replaced Márcio Careca after the Quarterfinals.

==== Matches ====
11 August Second Phase: Leg 1	Vasco da Gama (Brazil)	2–0	(Brazil) Palmeiras	Rio de Janeiro
21:50 (UTC−03:00)	Diego Souza 42'; Élton 79'	Report; Report		Stadium: Estádio São Januário; Attendance: 1.707 (paying); Referee: Leandro Pedro Vuaden (Rio Grande do Sul)

25 August Second Phase: Leg 2	Palmeiras (Brazil)	3–1 (3–3 (a) agg.)	(Brazil) Vasco da Gama	São Paulo
21:50 (UTC−03:00)	Luan 13'; Kléber 54'; Assunção 90+3'	Report; Report	Jumar 58'	Stadium: Estádio Municipal Paulo Machado de Carvalho; Attendance: 9,993 (paying); Referee: Héber Roberto Lopes (Paraná)

5 October Round of 16: Leg 1	Aurora (Bolivia)	3–1	(Brazil) Vasco da Gama	Cochabamba
20:45 (UTC−04:00)	Villalba 50'; Reynoso 58', 74'	Report; Report	Bernardo 41'	Stadium: Estadio Félix Capriles; Referee: Georges Buckley

26 October Round of 16: Leg 2	Vasco da Gama (Brazil)	8–3 (9–6 agg.)	(Bolivia) Aurora	Rio de Janeiro
19:00 (UTC−02:00)	Bernardo 9', 78'; Alecsandro 39', 45'; Leandro 49'; Juninho Pernambucano 69' (pen.); Douglas 82'; Allan 90+3'	Report; Report	Andaveris 16'; Diómedes Peña 72' (pen.); Segovia 87'	Stadium: Estádio São Januário; Referee: Julio Quintana

2 November Quarterfinals: Leg 1	Universitario (Peru)	2–0	(Brazil) Vasco da Gama	Lima
18:45 (UTC−05:00)	Ruidíaz 38' (pen.); Fano 60'	Report; Report		Stadium: Estadio Nacional; Referee: Carlos Vera

9 November Quarterfinals: Leg 2	Vasco da Gama (Brazil)	5–2 (5–4 agg.)	(Peru) Universitario	Rio de Janeiro
21:45 (UTC−02:00)	Diego Souza 24' (pen.); Élton 48'; Dedé 58', 73'; Alecsandro 82'	Report; Report	Ruidíaz 33'; Rabanal 47'	Stadium: Estádio São Januário; Referee: Carlos Amarilla

23 November Semifinals: Leg 1	Vasco da Gama (Brazil)	1–1	Universidad de Chile	Rio de Janeiro
21:45 (UTC−02:00)	Bernardo 34'	Report; Report	Osvaldo González 79'	Stadium: Estádio São Januário; Referee: Antonio Arias

30 November Semifinals: Leg 2	Universidad de Chile	2–0	(Brazil) Vasco da Gama	Santiago
20:45 (UTC−03:00)	Canales 31'; Eduardo Vargas 73'	Report; Report		Stadium: Estadio Santa Laura-Universidad SEK; Referee: Darío Ubriaco

== Starting XI ==
No.	Pos.	Nat.	Name	MS	Notes
1	GK	(Brazil)	Fernando Prass	74	
23	RB	(Brazil)	Fagner	52	Max has 2 starts Irrazábal has 1 starts
26	CB	(Brazil)	Dedé	60	Douglas has 6 starts Fernando has 4 starts Jomar has 3 starts
33	CB	(Brazil)	Renato Silva	26	Anderson Martins has 40 starts Victor Ramos has 4 starts Cesinha has 3 starts
32	LB	(Brazil)	Márcio Careca	21	Ramon has 23 starts Julinho has 12 starts
37	DM	(Brazil)	Rômulo	61	Eduardo Costa has 29 starts Jumar has 28 starts Nílton has 10 starts
35	CM	(Brazil)	Allan	35	Fellipe Bastos has 29 starts
6	AM	(Brazil)	Felipe	44	Juninho Pernambucano has 24 starts Jéferson has 9 starts
10	LM	(Brazil)	Diego Souza	50	Bernardo has 20 starts Carlos Alberto has 3 starts Enrico has 2 starts Diego Rosa has 5 starts Caíque has 1 start
7	RW	(Brazil)	Éder Luís	60	Leandro has 6 starts Jonathan has 1 start Misael has 1 start
9	CF	(Brazil)	Alecsandro	33	Élton has 24 starts Marcel has 9 starts Patric has 1 start

Source: Squad stats and Start formations.
Only competitive matches.
Using the most used start formation.
Ordered by position on pitch (from back right to front left).

== Honors ==
=== Individuals ===
Name	Number	Country	Award	Category	Result
Fernando Prass	1	(Brazil)	2011 Prêmio Craque do Brasileirão	Best Goalkeeper	Nominated
Fagner	23	(Brazil)	2011 Prêmio Craque do Brasileirão	best Right (wing) back	Won
Dedé	26	(Brazil)	2011 Campeonato Carioca	best Right Centre back	Won
			2011 Prêmio Craque do Brasileirão	fans Favorite Player	Won
			2011 Prêmio Craque do Brasileirão	best Right Centre back	Won
Anderson Martins	25	(Brazil)	2011 Campeonato Carioca	best Left Centre back	Won
Rômulo	37	(Brazil)	2011 Campeonato Carioca	best Defensive midfielder	Nominated
			2011 Prêmio Craque do Brasileirão	best Defensive midfielder	Nominated
Felipe	6	(Brazil)	2011 Campeonato Carioca	best Center and Attacking midfielder	Won
Diego Souza	10	(Brazil)	2011 Prêmio Craque do Brasileirão	best Side and Attacking midfielder	Won
Bernardo	31	(Brazil)	2011 Campeonato Carioca; 2011 Campeonato Carioca	best Side and Attacking midfielder Revelation of the year	Nominated
Éder Luís	7	(Brazil)	2011 Campeonato Carioca	best Second striker and Winger	Nominated
Ricardo Gomes		(Brazil)	2011 Campeonato Carioca	best Head coach	Nominated
Ricardo Gomes and Cristóvão Borges		(Brazil)	2011 Prêmio Craque do Brasileirão	best Head coach	Won

Name	Number	Country	Award
Dedé	26	(Brazil)	Named for Brazil national team in the friendlies v. Germany, Ghana, Mexico, Costa Rica and in the 2011 Superclásico de las Américas
Rômulo	37	(Brazil)	Named for Brazil national team in the 2011 Superclásico de las Américas
Diego Souza	10	(Brazil)	Named for Brazil national team in the second leg of the 2011 Superclásico de las Américas
Alecsandro	9	(Brazil)	2011 Copa do Brasil Top Goal Scorer

== IFFHS ranking ==
Vasco da Gama position on the Club World Ranking during the 2011 season, according to IFFHS.

Month	Position	Points
January	205	88,0
February	196	88,0
March	192	88,0
April	189	88,0
May	113	112,0
June	76	132,0
July	73	138,0
August	62	150,0
September	54	152,0
October	38	164,0
November	23	186,0
December	27	184,0

Last updated: 2011-12-01.
Source: IFFHS
