= 2010 CR Vasco da Gama season =

Vasco da Gama
2010 season
- Chairman: Roberto Dinamite
- Manager: Vágner Mancini (until 25 March); Gaúcho (25 March–18 May); Celso Roth (18 May–12 June); Paulo César Gusmão (from 13 June)
- Stadium: São Januário; Maracanã; Engenhão
- Campeonato Brasileiro Série A: 11th
- Copa do Brasil: Quarterfinals
- Campeonato Carioca: 4th Taça Guanabara: Runners-up; Taça Rio: Semifinals
- Top goalscorer: Éder Luís (9)
Home colours	Away colours	Third colours

The 2010 season was the 112th in the history of Club de Regatas Vasco da Gama. The club competed in the Campeonato Brasileiro Série A, as well as in the Campeonato Carioca and the Copa do Brasil.

== Statistics ==
=== Squad appearances and goals ===
Last updated on 5 December 2010.

No.	Pos	Nat	Player	Total		Campeonato Brasileiro Série A		Copa do Brasil		Campeonato Carioca		Other (Note: Includes appearances in friendlies.)	
No.	Pos	Nat	Player	Apps	Goals	Apps	Goals	Apps	Goals	Apps	Goals	Apps	Goals
Goalkeepers
1	GK	(Brazil) BRA	Fernando Prass	45	0	38	0	7	0	0	0	0	0
50	GK	(Brazil) BRA	Tiago	1	1	0	0	1	1	0	0	0	0
Defenders
38	DF	(Brazil) BRA	Carlinhos	10	0	6+4	0	0	0	0	0	0	0
3	DF	(Brazil) BRA	Cesinha	16	2	15+1	2	0	0	0	0	0	0
26	DF	(Brazil) BRA	Dedé	38	1	36	1	2	0	0	0	0	0
34	DF	(Brazil) BRA	Diogo	5	0	4+1	0	0	0	0	0	0	0
16	DF	(Brazil) BRA	Douglas	2	0	2	0	0	0	0	0	0	0
46	DF	(Brazil) BRA	Ernani	7	1	5+2	1	0	0	0	0	0	0
23	DF	(Brazil) BRA	Fagner	31	2	27+1	2	3	0	0	0	0	0
4	DF	(Brazil) BRA	Fernando	9	0	7	0	2	0	0	0	0	0
22	DF	(Paraguay) PAR	Julio Irrazábal	10	0	5+5	0	0	0	0	0	0	0
14	DF	(Brazil) BRA	Jadson Viera	1	0	1	0	0	0	0	0	0	0
43	DF	(Brazil) BRA	Max	10	1	8+2	1	0	0	0	0	0	0
33	DF	(Brazil) BRA	Ramon	14	3	9	2	4+1	1	0	0	0	0
13	DF	(Brazil) BRA	Titi	17	0	12+1	0	4	0	0	0	0	0
2	DF	(Brazil) BRA	Élder Granja	11	0	3+2	0	4+2	0	0	0	0	0
3	DF	(Brazil) BRA	Gian	1	0	0	0	1	0	0	0	0	0
5	DF	(Brazil) BRA	Gustavo	2	0	0	0	2	0	0	0	0	0
15	DF	(Brazil) BRA	Márcio Careca	3	0	0	0	3	0	0	0	0	0
44	DF	(Brazil) BRA	Thiago Martinelli	11	0	4	0	7	0	0	0	0	0
Midfielders
35	MF	(Brazil) BRA	Allan	14	0	3+11	0	0	0	0	0	0	0
20	MF	(Brazil) BRA	Caíque	4	0	2+2	0	0	0	0	0	0	0
19	MF	(Brazil) BRA	Carlos Alberto	13	2	6+3	0	4	2	0	0	0	0
6	MF	(Brazil) BRA	Felipe	18	1	16+2	1	0	0	0	0	0	0
21	MF	(Brazil) BRA	Fellipe Bastos	14	2	11+3	2	0	0	0	0	0	0
25	MF	(Brazil) BRA	Fumagalli	16	2	4+11	2	0+1	0	0	0	0	0
32	MF	(Brazil) BRA	Jeferson Silva	4	0	0+4	0	0	0	0	0	0	0
18	MF	(Brazil) BRA	Jumar	21	0	14+6	0	1	0	0	0	0	0
17	MF	(Brazil) BRA	Magno	9	2	1+3	0	2+3	2	0	0	0	0
5	MF	(Brazil) BRA	Nílton	27	3	22	3	5	0	0	0	0	0
8	MF	(Brazil) BRA	Rafael Carioca	41	0	33+1	0	7	0	0	0	0	0
28	MF	(Brazil) BRA	Renato Augusto	5	1	2+3	1	0	0	0	0	0	0
37	MF	(Brazil) BRA	Rômulo	22	2	18+4	2	0	0	0	0	0	0
10	MF	(Brazil) BRA	Zé Roberto	24	5	24	5	0	0	0	0	0	0
7	MF	(Brazil) BRA	Jéferson	6	0	4+1	0	1	0	0	0	0	0
27	MF	(Brazil) BRA	Léo Gago	11	2	3+5	1	3	1	0	0	0	0
22	MF	(Brazil) BRA	Paulinho	4	0	1	0	2+1	0	0	0	0	0
30	MF	(Brazil) BRA	Philippe Coutinho	14	2	7	1	7	1	0	0	0	0
14	MF	(Brazil) BRA	Souza	11	0	6+1	0	3+1	0	0	0	0	0
Forwards
39	FW	(Brazil) BRA	Bruno Paulo	3	1	2+1	1	0	0	0	0	0	0
7	FW	(Brazil) BRA	Éder Luís	27	9	25+2	9	0	0	0	0	0	0
15	FW	(Brazil) BRA	Jonathan	22	1	7+15	1	0	0	0	0	0	0
29	FW	(Brazil) BRA	Nilson	4	0	1+3	0	0	0	0	0	0	0
9	FW	(Brazil) BRA	Nunes	13	3	10+3	3	0	0	0	0	0	0
11	FW	(Brazil) BRA	Rafael Coelho	13	0	7+3	0	2+1	0	0	0	0	0
10	FW	(Brazil) BRA	Dodô	10	0	1+3	0	2+4	0	0	0	0	0
9	FW	(Brazil) BRA	Élton	15	6	6+2	2	7	4	0	0	0	0
16	FW	(Brazil) BRA	Geovane Maranhão	2	0	0	0	0+2	0	0	0	0	0
41	FW	(Brazil) BRA	Robinho	4	0	0	0	2+2	0	0	0	0	0
11	FW	(Brazil) BRA	Rodrigo Pimpão	3	0	0	0	0+3	0	0	0	0	0
