= 2011 Copa do Brasil finals =

2011 Copa do Brasil Finals
- Event: 2011 Copa Kia do Brasil
Vasco da Gama	Coritiba
(Rio de Janeiro (state))	(Paraná (state))
3	3
- (away goals rule)

First leg
Vasco da Gama	Coritiba
1	0
- Date: June 1, 2011
- Venue: Estádio São Januário, Rio de Janeiro
- Referee: Paulo César de Oliveira (SP)
- Attendance: 21,365

Second leg
Coritiba	Vasco da Gama
3	2
- Date: June 8, 2011
- Venue: Estádio Couto Pereira, Curitiba
- Referee: Sálvio Fagundes (SP)
- Attendance: 31,516

The 2011 Copa do Brasil Finals was a two-legged Brazilian football that determinate the 2011 Copa do Brasil champion. It was played on June 1 and 8. It was contested by Vasco da Gama, the 3rd place in the CBF Club Ranking, and Coritiba, the 2010 Campeonato Paranaense winners.

Vasco won the finals on away goals rule.

== Background ==
Vasco da Gama and Coritiba, two former Brazilian champions, were the last two champions of the Série B (Vasco da Gama in 2009, Coritiba in 2010) and were known as the "teams-sensation" of Brazilian football.

=== Vasco da Gama ===
Vasco da Gama, after a poor start in the Campeonato Carioca, has rebounded with the arrival of players like Diego Souza, Alecsandro, Bernardo, and especially the coming of the coach Ricardo Gomes, which along with players like Fernando Prass, Dedé, Anderson Martins, Felipe, Éder Luís, Eduardo Costa and Rômulo, not only reaching the Copa do Brasil finals, as well as the Taça Rio Final (on penalties being defeated by archrival, Flamengo).

Vasco da Gama had already played a final before: in 2006, the team lost the competition for his archrival, Flamengo. On this occasion the team cross-Maltin was defeated in both games: 2–0 in the first game and 1–0 in the second.

=== Coritiba ===
Coritiba already had an undefeated title (Campeonato Paranaense) and a record winning streak unprecedented in football worldwide, getting into the Guinness Book: a record of 24 wins, being broken in the second game of the quarter-final against Palmeiras. The young team led by players like Rafinha, Davi, Marcos Aurélio, Anderson Aquino and the coach Marcelo Oliveira, who continued the work of Ney Franco (who went to the Brazil U-20), was the leading team of Brazil in the first half of 2011.

Before to that final, the Coritiba had never played a Copa do Brasil finals. His best result in the competition came in 1991, 2001 and 2009, when the team played in the semi-finals in this years.

== Road to the Finals ==
Vasco da Gama
Opponent	Venue	Score
(Mato Grosso do Sul) Comercial (MS)	Away	1 - 6
(Mato Grosso do Sul) Comercial (MS)	Home	was not necessary
(Rio Grande do Norte) ABC	Away	0 – 0
(Rio Grande do Norte) ABC	Home	2 – 1
(Pernambuco) Náutico Capibaribe	Away	0 – 3
(Pernambuco) Náutico Capibaribe	Home	0 – 0
(Paraná (state)) Atlético Paranaense	Away	2 – 2
(Paraná (state)) Atlético Paranaense	Home	1 – 1
(Santa Catarina (state)) Avaí	Home	1 – 1
(Santa Catarina (state)) Avaí	Away	0 – 2

Coritiba
Opponent	Venue	Score
(Rio Grande do Sul) Ypiranga de Erechim	Away	0 – 1
(Rio Grande do Sul) Ypiranga de Erechim	Home	2 – 0
(Goiás) Atlético Goianiense	Away	1 – 2
(Goiás) Atlético Goianiense	Home	3 – 1
(Rio Grande do Sul) Caxias do Sul	Home	4 – 0
(Rio Grande do Sul) Caxias do Sul	Away	0 – 1
(São Paulo (state)) Palmeiras	Home	6 – 0
(São Paulo (state)) Palmeiras	Away	2 – 0
Ceará	Away	0 – 0
Ceará	Home	1 – 0

== First leg ==
June 1
21:50

Vasco da Gama	1–0	Coritiba
Alecsandro 51'	Report

Estádio São Januário
Attendance: 21,365
Referee: Paulo César de Oliveira (SP / FIFA)

Vasco da Gama	Coritiba

GK	1	(Brazil) Fernando Prass (c)
DF	35	(Brazil) Allan
DF	25	(Brazil) Anderson Martins
DF	26	(Brazil) Dedé
DF	32	(Brazil) Márcio Careca
MF	37	(Brazil) Rômulo
MF	8	(Brazil) Eduardo Costa
MF	6	(Brazil) Felipe	(substituted off) 66'
MF	10	(Brazil) Diego Souza
FW	31	(Brazil) Bernardo
FW	9	(Brazil) Alecsandro	(substituted off) 84'
Substitutes:
G	12	(Brazil) Alessandro
LD	23	(Brazil) Fagner
V	18	(Brazil) Jumar
V	21	(Brazil) Fellipe Bastos	(substituted on) 66'
M	11	(Brazil) Jéferson
A	19	(Brazil) Leandro
A	39	(Brazil) Élton	(substituted on) 84'
Coach:
(Brazil) Ricardo Gomes

G	1	(Brazil) Edson Bastos
LD	2	(Brazil) Jonas
Z	3	(Brazil) Demerson
Z	4	(Brazil) Émerson (c)
LE	6	(Brazil) Lucas Mendes
V	5	(Brazil) Willian
V	8	(Brazil) Léo Gago
M	7	(Brazil) Rafinha
M	10	(Brazil) Davi	(substituted off) 73'
A	11	(Brazil) Anderson Aquino	(substituted off) 73'	Booked
A	9	(Brazil) Bill	(substituted off) 70'
Substitutes:
G	12	(Brazil) Vanderlei
LD	13	(Brazil) Maranhão
Z	14	(Brazil) Jeci
V	15	(Brazil) Marcos Paulo	(substituted on) 73'
M	16	(Brazil) Tcheco
M	17	(Angola) Geraldo	(substituted on) 73'
A	18	(Brazil) Leonardo	(substituted on) 70'
Coach:
(Brazil) Marcelo Oliveira

== Second leg ==
June 8
21:50

Coritiba	3–2	Vasco da Gama
Bill 29'; Davi 44'; Willian 66'	Report	12' Alecsandro; 57' Éder Luís

Estádio Couto Pereira
Attendance: 31,516
Referee: Sálvio Fagundes (SP / FIFA)

Coritiba	Vasco da Gama

G	1	(Brazil) Edson Bastos
LD	2	(Brazil) Jonas
Z	3	(Brazil) Demerson
Z	4	(Brazil) Émerson (c)
LE	6	(Brazil) Lucas Mendes	(substituted off) 58'
V	5	(Brazil) Willian
V	8	(Brazil) Léo Gago	(substituted off) 59'	Booked
V	11	(Brazil) Marcos Paulo	(substituted off) 27'
M	7	(Brazil) Rafinha
M	10	(Brazil) Davi
A	9	(Brazil) Bill		Booked
Substitutes:
G	12	(Brazil) Vanderlei
Z	13	(Brazil) Jeci
LE	14	(Brazil) Eltinho	(substituted on) 58'
M	15	(Brazil) Tcheco
M	17	(Angola) Geraldo
A	16	(Brazil) Marcos Aurélio	(substituted on) 59'
A	18	(Brazil) Leonardo	(substituted on) 27'	Booked
Coach:
(Brazil) Marcelo Oliveira

G	1	(Brazil) Fernando Prass (c)
LD	35	(Brazil) Allan
Z	25	(Brazil) Anderson Martins
Z	26	(Brazil) Dedé
LE	33	(Brazil) Ramon
V	37	(Brazil) Rômulo
V	8	(Brazil) Eduardo Costa		Booked
M	6	(Brazil) Felipe	(substituted off) 79'	Booked
M	10	(Brazil) Diego Souza	(substituted off) 79'
A	7	(Brazil) Éder Luís
A	9	(Brazil) Alecsandro
Substitutes:
G	12	(Brazil) Alessandro
LD	23	(Brazil) Fagner
LE	32	(Brazil) Márcio Careca
V	18	(Brazil) Jumar	(substituted on) 79'	Booked
V	21	(Brazil) Fellipe Bastos
M	31	(Brazil) Bernardo	(substituted on) 79'
A	39	(Brazil) Élton
Coach:
(Brazil) Ricardo Gomes

== See also ==
- 2011 Campeonato Brasileiro Série A
