= Cascata (disambiguation) =

Cascata means waterfall in some Latin-based languages. It may also refer to:

- Cascata, a neighbourhood in Porto Alegre, Rio Grande do Sul, Brazil
- Cascata delle Marmore, a waterfall near Terni, Umbria, Italy
- Cascata del Toce, a waterfall near Formazza, Piedmont, Italy
- Parque da Cascata, a park in Seta Lagoas, Mina Gerais, Brazil
- Caracol Falls (Cascata do Caracol in Portuguese), a waterfall near Canela, Rio Grande do Sul, Brazil
- Cascata (footballer), Antônio Givanildo da Silva Santos (born 1982), Brazilian footballer

== See also ==
- List of waterfalls
