= Renato Augusto (disambiguation) =

Renato Augusto (born 1988) is a Brazilian football midfielder for Corinthians and the Brazil national team.

Renato Augusto may also refer to:

- Renato Augusto (footballer, born 1990), Brazilian former football midfielder Renato Augusto de Assis Pinto
- Renato Augusto (footballer, born 1992), Brazilian football midfielder Renato Augusto Santos Júnior
