= Diego Rosa (footballer, born 1989) =

Brazilian footballer

Personal information
- Full name: Diego da Silva Rosa
- Date of birth: 22 March 1989 (age 37)
- Place of birth: Campo Grande, Brazil
- Height: 1.80 m (5 ft 11 in)
- Position: Attacking midfielder

Team information
- Current team: Manaus

Youth career
- Internacional
- 2008–2009: Juventude

Senior career*
Years	Team	Apps	(Gls)
2009–2010	Juventude	17	(1)
2010–2012	Vasco da Gama	22	(0)
2013	Ponte Preta	17	(2)
2013	ASA	9	(0)
2014	Paulista	6	(0)
2014	CRB	23	(3)
2015	Penapolense	15	(1)
2015	Luverdense	37	(10)
2016	Montedio Yamagata	19	(2)
2017	Bahia	20	(5)
2017	Atlético Goianiense	22	(5)
2018–2019	São Caetano	23	(0)
2018	→ CRB (loan)	25	(1)
2019	Paysandu	15	(0)
2019	Vila Nova	6	(0)
2020	Aparecidense	9	(2)
2020	Portuguesa	5	(1)
2020	Botafogo-PB	9	(2)
2020–	Manaus	15	(9)
- * Club domestic league appearances and goals as of 23:51, 19 June 2019 (UTC)

Diego da Silva Rosa (born 22 March 1989), known as Diego Rosa, is a Brazilian professional footballer who plays as an attacking midfielder for Manaus.

== Honors ==
Vasco da Gama

- Copa do Brasil: 2011
