= Julinho (footballer, born 1986) =

Brazilian footballer

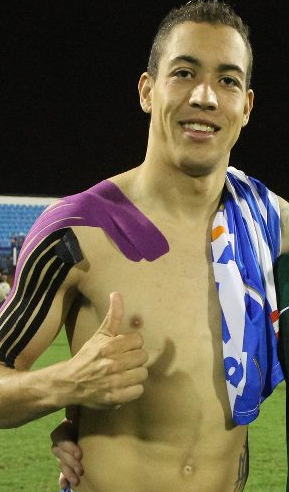

Personal information
- Full name: Júlio César Godinho Catole
- Date of birth: 5 August 1986 (age 40)
- Place of birth: São Paulo, Brazil
- Height: 1.84 m (6 ft 0 in)
- Position: Left-back

Youth career
- 2002–2003: Corinthians
- 2004–2006: Atlético Ibirama

Senior career*
| Years | Team | Apps | (Gls) |
| 2006–2010 | Atlético Ibirama | 16 | (3) |
| 2010 | → Metropolitano (loan) | 2 | (0) |
| 2010–2014 | Avaí | 87 | (9) |
| 2011 | → Vasco da Gama (loan) | 13 | (0) |
| 2012 | → Sport Recife (loan) | 3 | (0) |
| 2013 | → Altamira (loan) | 3 | (1) |
| 2014 | → Guarani (loan) | 6 | (1) |
| 2014 | → Santa Cruz (loan) | 11 | (0) |
| 2015–2016 | Operário | 11 | (1) |
| 2016–2018 | Hokkaido Consadole Sapporo | 54 | (17) |
| 2018 | → Renofa Yamaguchi (loan) | 7 | (1) |
| 2019 | Avaí | 18 | (2) |
| 2020–2021 | Operário Ferroviário | 19 | (1) |
| 2021 | São Bernardo | 1 | (0) |
- * Club domestic league appearances and goals as of 14 March 2021

Júlio César Godinho Catole (born 5 August 1986), commonly known as Julinho, is a Brazilian professional footballer who plays as a left-back.

== Career statistics ==
Updated to 23 February 2018.

| Club performance | | | League | | Cup | | League Cup | | Total | |
| Season | Club | League | Apps | Goals | Apps | Goals | Apps | Goals | Apps | Goals |
| Japan | | | League | | Emperor's Cup | | J. League Cup | | Total | |
|---|---|---|---|---|---|---|---|---|---|---|
| 2016 | Hokkaido Consadole Sapporo | J2 League | 34 | 12 | 0 | 0 | – | | 34 | 12 |
| 2017 | Hokkaido Consadole Sapporo | J1 League | 10 | 2 | 0 | 0 | 1 | 0 | 11 | 2 |
| Total | | | 44 | 14 | 0 | 0 | 1 | 0 | 45 | 14 |

== Honours ==
Avaí

- Campeonato Catarinense: 2019
