= Bernardo (footballer, born 1990) =

Brazilian footballer

Personal information
- Full name: Bernardo Vieira de Souza
- Date of birth: 20 May 1990 (age 36)
- Place of birth: Sorocaba, Brazil
- Height: 1.76 m (5 ft 9 in)
- Position: Attacking midfielder

Team information
- Current team: Rio Branco
- Number: 21

Youth career
- 2002–2009: Cruzeiro

Senior career*
Years	Team	Apps	(Gls)
2009–2011	Cruzeiro	40	(5)
2010	→ Goiás (loan)	31	(7)
2011	→ Vasco da Gama (loan)	57	(18)
2012–2015	Vasco da Gama	62	(15)
2012	→ Santos (loan)	14	(1)
2014	→ Palmeiras (loan)	8	(0)
2015	→ Ceará (loan)	10	(0)
2016	Ulsan Hyundai	0	(0)
2016	Coritiba	10	(0)
2017	Botafogo-SP	10	(0)
2017	Al Tadhamon	3	(0)
2018	Ipatinga	8	(1)
2018–2019	Al-Khaleej	32	(6)
2020	Volta Redonda	13	(0)
2020	Pegasus	2	(0)
2021–	Rio Branco	0	(0)

International career
2005	Brazil U15	16	(14)
2007	Brazil U17	0	(0)
- * Club domestic league appearances and goals as of 12 February 2021

Bernardo Vieira de Souza (born 20 May 1990), better known as Bernardo, is a Brazilian professional footballer who plays as an attacking midfielder for Rio Branco.

== Club career ==
Bernardo was promoted to professionals in 2009 to the professional team of Cruzeiro, after a distinguished in Copa São Paulo de Juniores, where he was the top scorer.

Bernardo's professional debut was in a 5-0 victory against Guarani-MG in the State Championship. He began to be used more frequently after injuries to players Wágner, Fernandinho, and Sorín. His first professional goal was a penalty he scored in a 7-0 victory against the Democrata.

In May 2010, Bernando was loaned to Goiás until the end of that year.

In January 2011, he joined Vasco on loan. He was part of the squad that won the Copa do Brasil in June, contributing with 2 goals. Bernardo finished the season as Vasco's top scorer, with 18 goals. He scored many important goals, like in the Copa Sudamericana semi-finals against U de Chile, and in the penultimate league matchday against Fluminense. Vasco had a great campaign in the Serie A, finishing runner-up, just two points from champions Corinthians.

Due to his impressive performances, Vasco decided to make his loan permanent and he was signed on a 3 year contract. For the 2012 season, he was loaned out to Santos. In May 2012, he suffered an injury, which kept him out until the beginning of September, and limited his involvement with the club.

For 2013 he returned to Vasco. He began the season strongly, scoring 7 goals in 10 matches, including one in the semi-final against Fluminense, to help his club finish runner-up in the Campeonato Carioca. However, he suffered another injury in April 2013, in the state league against Quissamã, which required surgery and kept him out until October. The team struggled without him and were relegated at the end of the year, with Bernardo limited to only 4 league appearances.

He played the 2014 Carioca at the beginning of the year and scored 3 goals, but was loaned out to Palmeiras for in May for the 2014 Campeonato Brasileiro Série A. However he had limited playing time at Palmeiras (only 8 appearances) because he was close to the bottom of the pecking order, behind players like Jorge Valdivia and Alan Kardec. Another reason could be attributed to the team's struggles as the club nearly suffered relegation.

He returned to Vasco for the 2015 season; however, in June, he was suspended by the club president for indiscipline.

In November 2020, Bernando joined Hong Kong Premier League club Pegasus.

On 12 February 2021, Bernardo terminated his contract with Pegasus to return to Brazil and sign with Rio Branco.

== Career statistics ==
=== Club ===
As of 11 November 2023

Appearances and goals by club, season and competition
Club	Season	League		State League		Cup		Continental		Total	
Club	Season	Apps	Goals	Apps	Goals	Apps	Goals	Apps	Goals	Apps	Goals
Cruzeiro	2009	13	1	11	1	–		4	0	28	2
Cruzeiro	2010	–		11	2	–		3	1	14	3
Cruzeiro	Total	13	1	22	3	0	0	7	1	42	5
Goiás	2010	26	7	–		–		5	0	31	7
Vasco da Gama	2011	30	6	10	6	10	2	8	4	58	18
Vasco da Gama	2012	–		5	1	–		0	0	5	1
Vasco da Gama	2013	4	1	15	7	–		–		19	8
Vasco da Gama	2014	–		13	3	1	0	–		14	3
Vasco da Gama	2015	3	0	15	3	3	0	–		21	3
Vasco da Gama	Total	37	7	58	20	14	2	8	4	117	33
Santos (loan)	2012	14	1	–		–		–		14	1
Palmeiras (loan)	2014	8	0	–		–		–		8	0
Ceará	2015	10	0	–		–		–		10	0
Ulsan Hyundai FC	2016	0	0	–		–		–		0	0
Coritiba	2016	6	0	–		–		4	0	10	0
Botafogo–SP	2017	–		10	0	–		–		10	0
Ipatinga	2018	–		8	1	–		–		8	1
Al-Khaleej	2018–19	2	0	–		–		–		2	0
Volta Redonda	2020	6	0	13	0	1	0	–		20	0
Hong Kong Pegasus	2020–21	2	0	–		1	0	–		3	0
Rio Branco–PR	2021	–		9	1	–		–		9	1
Brasiliense	2021	2	0	–		–		4	1	6	1
Brasiliense	2022	10	3	12	1	3	0	–		25	4
Brasiliense	Total	12	3	12	1	3	0	4	1	31	5
Maguary	2023	–		9	3	–		–		9	3
Maricá	2023	–		7	1	–		–		7	1
Career total		136	19	148	30	19	2	28	6	331	57

== Honours ==
Cruzeiro

- Campeonato Mineiro: 2009

Vasco da Gama

- Copa do Brasil: 2011
- Campeonato Carioca: 2015
