= Misael (footballer, born 1987) =

Brazilian footballer

Personal information
- Full name: Misael Silva Jansen
- Date of birth: 4 July 1987 (age 39)
- Place of birth: São Luís, Brazil
- Height: 1.71 m (5 ft 7 in)
- Position: Forward

Senior career*
Years	Team	Apps	(Gls)
2006–2009	Moto Club		
2006	→ Sampaio Corrêa (loan)		
2009–2013	Ceará	98	(11)
2011	→ Vasco da Gama (loan)	1	(0)
2011	→ Sport (loan)	6	(0)
2013	Atlético Sorocaba	10	(0)
2013–2015	Luverdense	43	(11)
2014–2015	→ Ituano (loan)	13	(2)
2015–2016	Paysandu	22	(0)
2016–2017	Red Bull Brasil	0	(0)
2016	→ Bahia (loan)	7	(0)
2017	Red Bull Brasil	16	(3)
2017	Brasil de Pelotas	20	(1)
2018	Ferroviária	11	(0)
2018	Joinville	6	(0)
2018	Sampaio Corrêa	8	(0)
2019	XV de Piracicaba	16	(0)
2019	Santa Cruz	9	(2)
2019	XV de Piracicaba	0	(0)
2020	Votuporanguense	12	(2)
2020	Barra-SC	6	(0)
2021	Portuguesa	17	(2)
2022	Audax Rio	7	(1)
2022	Comercial-SP	0	(0)
2022	IAPE	0	(0)
2023	Atlético Alagoinhas	5	(3)
2023	Anapolina	3	(0)
2023	Tupan	2	(0)
2024	Moto Club	4	(0)
- * Club domestic league appearances and goals as of 15:45, 8 August 2024 (UTC)

Misael Silva Jansen (born 4 July 1987 in São Luís, Brazil), simply known as Misael, is a Brazilian footballer who plays as a forward.

== Career ==
Misael started on Moto Club, then was loaned to Sampaio Corrêa to get to Ceará in 2009 but was signed in 2010 as a starter and main player in the club. He moved on loan to Vasco da Gama and Sport Recife in the 2011 season.

=== Career statistics ===
As of 13 February 2017

Appearances and goals by club, season and competition
Club	Season	National League			State League		National Cup		Continental		Other		Total	
Club	Season	Division	Apps	Goals	Apps	Goals	Apps	Goals	Apps	Goals	Apps	Goals	Apps	Goals
Ceará	2009	Série B	25	5	19	5	–		–		–		44	10
Ceará	2010	Série A	21	1	21	3	3	2	–		–		45	6
Ceará	Subtotal		46	6	40	8	3	2	–		–		89	16
Vasco da Gama	2011	Série A	1	0	3	0	–		–		–		4	0
Sport	2011	Série B	6	0	–		–		–		–		6	0
Ceará	2012	Série B	19	1	12	1	2	0	–		–		33	2
Atlético Sorocaba	2013	Paulista	–		10	0	–		–		–		10	0
Luverdense	2013	Série C	15	2	–		4	0	–		–		19	2
Luverdense	2014	Série B	28	9	13	3	–		–		–		41	12
Luverdense	Subtotal		43	11	13	3	4	0	–		–		60	14
Ituano	2015	Paulista	–		13	2	–		–		–		13	2
Paysandu	2015	Série B	22	0	–		3	1	–		–		25	1
Red Bull Brasil	2016	Paulista	–		14	3	2	0	–		7 (Note: All appearance(s) in Copa Paulista)	1	23	4
Bahia	2016	Série B	7	0	–		–		–		–		7	0
Red Bull Brasil	2017	Paulista	–		3	1	–		–		–		3	1
Career Total			144	18	108	18	14	3	0	0	7	1	273	40

== Contract ==
- Ceará.
