= Mateus (footballer, born 1987) =

Brazilian footballer

Personal information
- Full name: Mateus de Oliveira Barbosa
- Date of birth: May 18, 1987 (age 39)
- Place of birth: Ponte Nova, Brazil
- Height: 1.81 m (5 ft 11 in)
- Position: Defensive midfielder

Youth career
- 2005–2006: Vasco da Gama

Senior career*
Years	Team	Apps	(Gls)
2007–2013	Vasco da Gama	36	(0)
2007	→ Bréscia (loan)	0	(0)
2010	→ Bahia (loan)	0	(0)
2010	→ Ettifaq FC (loan)	26	(4)
2011	→ Criciúma	16	(0)
2013	Mogi Mirim		
2014	Lajeadense		
2015	Novo Hamburgo		
- * Club domestic league appearances and goals

Mateus de Oliveira Barbosa (born May 18, 1987), known only by Mateus, is a Brazilian former professional footballer who played as a defensive midfielder. He was contracted to Vasco da Gama for six years, spending several years out on loan until he finally left in 2013.

== Career statistics ==
(Correct as of October 16, 2010)

Club	Season	State League		Brazilian Série A		Copa do Brasil		Copa Libertadores		Copa Sudamericana		Total	
Club	Season	Apps	Goals	Apps	Goals	Apps	Goals	Apps	Goals	Apps	Goals	Apps	Goals
Vasco da Gama	2007	-	-	0	0	-	-	-	-	-	-	0	0
Vasco da Gama	2008	-	-	0	0	-	-	-	-	-	-	0	0
Vasco da Gama	2009	-	-	0	0	-	-	-	-	-	-	0	0
Total		-	-	0	0	-	-	-	-	-	-	0	0
