= Dedé (footballer, born 1988) =

Brazilian footballer

Personal information
- Full name: Anderson Vital da Silva
- Date of birth: 1 July 1988 (age 38)
- Place of birth: Volta Redonda, Brazil
- Height: 1.92 m (6 ft 3 1/2 in)
- Position: Centre back

Youth career
- 2002–2004: SE Aliança
- 2005–2008: Volta Redonda

Senior career*
Years	Team	Apps	(Gls)
2008–2009	Volta Redonda	20	(3)
2009–2013	Vasco da Gama	133	(14)
2013–2021	Cruzeiro	117	(10)
2022	Ponte Preta	2	(0)
2022	Athletico Paranaense	1	(0)

International career^{‡}
2011–2018	Brazil	11	(1)
- * Club domestic league appearances and goals as of 5 March 2022 ‡ National team caps and goals as of 11 September 2018

Anderson Vital da Silva, commonly known as Dedé (Brazilian Portuguese: [dɛˈdɛ]; born 1 July 1988) is a former Brazilian footballer who played as a centre-back.

== Club career ==
=== Vasco da Gama ===
After a spell in Campeonato Carioca for Volta Redonda in 2009, Dedé was loaned with a buy-out clause to Vasco da Gama. In Vasco da Gama, Dedé won his first title as a professional, the Brasileirão Série B in 2009, despite not having had many chances in the first team.

In 2010, Dedé started the year on the bench and had very few chances to show his skills at Vasco da Gama. However, in a game against Vitória, in the quarter-final of the Copa do Brasil, Dedé was selected due to the lack of available defenders and subsequently had his contract (which would end in a month) renewed until the end of 2010. He played very well and after a string of solid and impressive displays, became the defensive backbone of Vasco da Gama, becoming a fan favourite, heavily cheered by the club's supporters.

In October 2010, the buy-out clause was exercised, and subsequently Dedé and Vasco da Gama signed an agreement until the end of 2014. In the same year, Dedé won the award of best right centre back in Brasileirão. In 2011, formed a rock solid duo with Anderson Martins that won the 2011 Copa do Brasil, with both players being elected the best central defenders of the 2011 Campeonato Carioca.

Currently, Dedé is considered one of the best centre backs in Brazilian football, with great acclaim from critics and fans. Dedé has become one of the great idols of Vasco da Gama in the 21st century, turning up the campaign poster boy "Marco1924" (promotional clock that celebrates the victory of Vasco da Gama against racism in football), along with Fernando Prass. On 11 July, was elected by SBT and a popular vote as one of the 100 greatest Brazilians of all time. On one of his last games for Vasco da Gama, he kissed the club's emblem to show his love for the club even with his transfer.

=== Cruzeiro ===
On 17 April 2013, Dedé was confirmed as new player for Cruzeiro. Cruzeiro paid a fee of R$14 million for him plus midfielder Allison. Wellington Paulista, on loan with West Ham United was also included in the negotiation. Dedé became the most expensive player ever purchased by Cruzeiro. In an interview just after his transfer he stated he never intended to leave Vasco, but he knew his transfer would put an end to the financial problems the club was having, which led him to the decision to leave. He also stated that he was very sad to leave the club and even though he is leaving Vasco, his heart is staying.

Introduced in a supermarket in Belo Horizonte, home of his new club, Dedé appeared before journalists in an innovative publicity stunt. He later had his transfer blocked by FERJ, main football institution from Rio de Janeiro, the state of his former club Vasco da Gama. According to FERJ, the reason for the blockade was due to debts owed by Vasco da Gama to the Brazilian Federal Justice. While this debt does not be paid, the defender must not keep playing for any club. Despite these problems, Cruzeiro were not worried, considering them a matter that must be resolved by Vasco.

On 16 January 2015, it was reported that Dedé would have to undergo a surgery in his right knee, being expected to return after about 8 months. He underwent another surgery in the same knee in April 2015 and only returned in 2016. That year, he fractured a kneecap and had a new surgery in August, again in his right knee, after playing only six matches.

=== Ponte Preta ===
On 28 March 2022, Dedé's contract with Ponte Preta was terminated by mutual consent.

== International career ==
On 25 July 2011, after numerous great performances with Vasco da Gama, Dedé debuted with the Brazil national football team at the friendly match against Germany, on the first call by the coach Mano Menezes after their elimination in the 2011 Copa América.,

On 18 August, Dedé was selected again, this time for the friendly match against Ghana. Although he did not play in any of the aforementioned matches.

In 5 September, Dedé was selected for Superclásico de las Américas, where only players who played in Brazilian football were selected. On 14 September, Dedé finally debuted in Superclásico de las Américas.

On 15 October 2013, in a 2-0 friendly win against Zambia played in China, Dedé scored the second goal, heading in a free-kick cross by Neymar.

== Career statistics ==
=== Club ===
As of 16 February 2022

Club	Season	League			State League		National Cup		Continental		Other		Total	
Club	Season	Division	Apps	Goals	Apps	Goals	Apps	Goals	Apps	Goals	Apps	Goals	Apps	Goals
Volta Redonda	2008	Carioca	—		7	1	2	0	—		7 (Note: Appearance(s) in Copa Rio)	0	16	1
Volta Redonda	2009	Carioca	—		13	2	—		—		—		13	2
Volta Redonda	Total		—		20	3	2	0	—		7	0	29	3
Vasco da Gama	2009	Série B	5	0	—		—		—		—		5	0
Vasco da Gama	2010	Série A	36	1	1	0	2	0	—		—		39	3
Vasco da Gama	2011	Série A	30	6	15	3	11	1	4 (Note: Appearance(s) in Copa Sudamericana)	2	—		59	12
Vasco da Gama	2012	Série A	23	0	9	0	—		5 (Note: Appearance(s) in Copa Libertadores)	1	—		37	3
Vasco da Gama	2013	Série A	0	0	14	4	—		—		—		14	4
Vasco da Gama	Total		94	7	39	7	13	1	9	3	—		155	26
Cruzeiro	2013	Série A	31	2	—		4	1	—		—		35	3
Cruzeiro	2014	Série A	21	2	11	1	4	1	10	1	—		46	5
Cruzeiro	2015	Série A	0	0	0	0	0	0	—		—		0	0
Cruzeiro	2016	Série A	0	0	4	0	—		—		1 (Note: Appearance(s) in Primeira Liga)	0	5	0
Cruzeiro	2017	Série A	3	0	1	1	1	0	1	0	1	0	7	1
Cruzeiro	2018	Série A	20	3	6	0	8	0	9	0	—		43	3
Cruzeiro	2019	Série A	14	2	6	0	6	0	13	0	—		39	2
Cruzeiro	Total		89	9	28	1	22	2	33	1	2	0	174	14
Ponte Preta	2022	Série B	0	0	1	0	0	0	—		—		1	0
Career total			160	14	82	11	29	3	32	4	9	0	312	32

=== International ===
National team	Club	Season	Apps	Goals
Brazil	Vasco da Gama	2011	2	0
Brazil	Vasco da Gama	2012	4	0
Brazil	Vasco da Gama	2013	3	1
Brazil	Cruzeiro	2018	2	0
Total			11	1

=== International goals ===
Scores and results list Brazil's goal tally first.

No	Date	Venue	Opponent	Score	Result	Competition
1.	15 October 2013	Beijing National Stadium, Beijing, China	Zambia	2–0	2–0	International Friendly

== Awards and honours ==
=== Club ===
Vasco da Gama

- Campeonato Brasileiro Série B: 2009
- Copa do Brasil: 2011

Cruzeiro

- Campeonato Brasileiro Série A: 2013, 2014
- Campeonato Mineiro: 2014, 2018, 2019
- Copa do Brasil: 2017, 2018

=== International ===
Brazil

- Superclásico de las Américas: 2011

=== Individual ===
- 63rd Greatest Brazilian Ever
- Campeonato Carioca Team of the Year: 2010, 2011
- Campeonato Brasileiro Série A Team of the Year: 2010, 2011, 2013, 2014
- Bola de Prata: 2011
- Campeonato Brasileiro Série A Best Fan's Player: 2011
- Best Centre-back in Brazil: 2018
