= Marcos Paulo (footballer, born 1990) =

Brazilian footballer

Personal information
- Full name: Marcos Paulo Ramos da Silva
- Date of birth: 4 February 1990 (age 36)
- Place of birth: Florianópolis, Brazil
- Height: 1.84 m (6 ft 0 in)
- Position: Defensive midfielder

Team information
- Current team: Inter SM

Youth career
- –2008: Avaí

Senior career*
Years	Team	Apps	(Gls)
2008–2010	Avaí		
2009	→ Iguaçu (loan)		
2009–2010	→ Coritiba (loan)		
2010–2015	Coritiba	35	(2)
2011	→ Avaí (loan)	7	(0)
2012	→ Goiás (loan)	26	(3)
2013	→ Náutico (loan)	12	(2)
2014	→ Bragantino (loan)	9	(0)
2015	Paraná	8	(0)
2016	Rio Branco	3	(0)
2016	Anápolis	4	(0)
2017	Mirassol	1	(0)
2018	Cuiabá		
2019	Iguaçu		
2020–	Inter SM		
- * Club domestic league appearances and goals as of 16:28, 30 March 2020 (UTC)

Marcos Paulo Ramos da Silva (born 4 February 1990), known as Marcos Paulo, is a Brazilian footballer who plays as a defensive midfielder for Inter SM.
