= Jeci =

Brazilian footballer

Personal information
- Full name: Jecimauro José Borges
- Date of birth: 22 April 1980 (age 46)
- Place of birth: Guaratinguetá, Brazil
- Height: 1.84 m (6 ft 0 in)
- Position: Defender

Team information
- Current team: Avaí
- Number: 3

Youth career
- 2001–2002: Bragantino

Senior career*
Years	Team	Apps	(Gls)
1999–2002	Taubaté		
2003	Mauaense		
2004	Guaratinguetá		
2004	Criciúma		
2005	Portuguesa Santista		
2005	Ituano		
2006	São Bento		
2006	Remo		
2007–2008	Guaratinguetá		
2007–2008	→ Coritiba (loan)	3	(0)
2008–2009	Palmeiras	26	(2)
2009–2011	Coritiba	87	(10)
2012–2014	Kawasaki Frontale	56	(6)
2015	Avaí	27	(1)
2016–2017	Novorizontino	18	(0)
Total		217	(19)
- * Club domestic league appearances and goals as of 30 March 2017

Jecimauro José Borges (born 22 April 1980), commonly known as Jeci, is a Brazilian footballer who plays as a central defender.

== Career ==
Jeci enjoyed success with Coritiba Foot Ball Club, winning the Campeonato Brasileiro Série B twice (in 2007 and 2010) and the Campeonato Paranaense three times (in 2008, 2010 and 2011). In 2012, he moved to Japan where he would play with Kawasaki Frontale for three seasons.

== Career statistics ==
Appearances and goals by club, season and competition.
Club	Season	League			State League		Cup		League Cup		Continental		Total	
Club	Season	Division	Apps	Goals	Apps	Goals	Apps	Goals	Apps	Goals	Apps	Goals	Apps	Goals
Coritiba (loan)	2008	Série A	3	0	—		4	0	—		—		7	0
Palmeiras	2008	Série A	18	2	—		—		—		0	0	18	2
Palmeiras	2009	Série A	—		8	0	0	0	—		2	0	10	0
Palmeiras	Total		18	2	8	0	0	0	—		2	0	28	2
Coritiba	2009	Série A	21	2	—		—		—		—		21	2
Coritiba	2010	Série B	34	3	0	0	3	0	—		—		37	3
Coritiba	2011	Série A	23	5	9	0	1	0	—		—		33	5
Coritiba	Total		78	10	9	0	4	0	—		—		91	10
Kawasaki Frontale	2012	J. League Division 1	15	1	—		2	0	3	1	—		20	2
Kawasaki Frontale	2013	J. League Division 1	19	3	—		2	0	3	0	—		24	3
Kawasaki Frontale	2014	J. League Division 1	22	2	—		1	0	2	1	8	1	33	4
Kawasaki Frontale	Total		56	6	—		5	0	8	2	8	1	77	9
Avaí	2015	Série A	19	0	8	1	3	0	—		—		30	1
Novorizontino	2016	Paulista	—		14	0	—		—		—		14	0
Novorizontino	2017	Paulista	—		4	0	—		—		—		4	0
Novorizontino	Total		—		18	0	—		—		—		18	0
Total			359	22	4	0	15	0	2	0	4	0	384	22
