= Rômulo (footballer, born 1990) =

Brazilian footballer

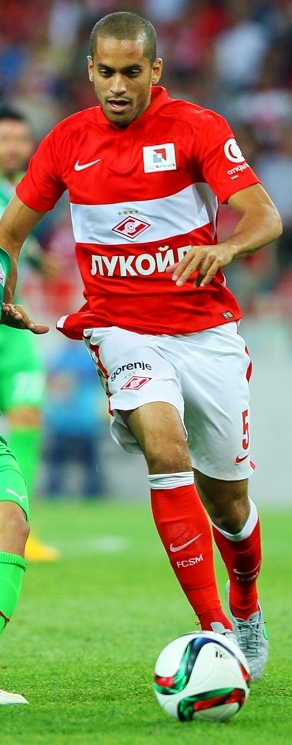
- Rômulo with Spartak Moscow in 2015

Personal information
- Full name: Rômulo Borges Monteiro
- Date of birth: 19 September 1990 (age 36)
- Place of birth: Picos, Brazil
- Height: 1.84 m (6 ft 1/2 in)
- Position: Defensive midfielder

Team information
- Current team: Retrô
- Number: 5

Youth career
- 2004–2009: Porto de Caruaru
- 2009–2010: Vasco da Gama

Senior career*
Years	Team	Apps	(Gls)
2010–2012	Vasco da Gama	106	(8)
2012–2016	Spartak Moscow	69	(4)
2017–2019	Flamengo	39	(1)
2019	→ Grêmio (loan)	30	(2)
2020–2021	Shijiazhuang Ever Bright	17	(0)
2021	Vasco da Gama	18	(0)
2022–	Retrô	35	(0)

International career^{‡}
2012	Brazil U23	6	(1)
2011–2012	Brazil	9	(1)
Medal record
Representing Brazil
Men's Football
Silver medal – second place	2012 London	Team competition
- * Club domestic league appearances and goals as of 1 September 2024 ‡ National team caps and goals as of 10 September 2012

Rômulo Borges Monteiro (born 19 September 1990), known simply as Rômulo, is a Brazilian footballer who plays as a defensive midfielder for Retrô.

Rômulo is known for his defensive abilities and initiation of attacks from the back, "He tracks his runner well and judges his tackles with composure" and is not scared to get forward.

== Club career ==
=== Spartak Moscow ===
Rômulo signed for Spartak Moscow in the summer of 2012 for a fee of around €8 million. He missed one-and-a-half seasons due to an injury against FC Rostov.

Rômulo left Spartak Moscow on 13 January 2017, after both agreed to the mutual termination of his contract.

=== Flamengo ===
On 13 January 2017 Rômulo signed with Brazilian Série A club Flamengo a four-year contract.

==== Grêmio (loan) ====
On 3 January 2019 Grêmio signed Rômulo from Flamengo on loan until the end of the 2019 season.

== International career ==
Rômulo played all six of Brazil's matches as they earned the silver medal at the 2012 Olympic tournament. He scored the opening goal of the 3–0 win over South Korea in the semi-final at Old Trafford, set up by Oscar.

== Career statistics ==
=== Club ===
As of 31 December 2025

Appearances and goals by club, season and competition
Club	Season	League			State League		Cup		Continental		Other		Total	
Club	Season	Division	Apps	Goals	Apps	Goals	Apps	Goals	Apps	Goals	Apps	Goals	Apps	Goals
Vasco da Gama	2010	Série A	22	2	—		0	0	0	0	—		22	2
Vasco da Gama	2011	Série A	32	1	17	3	8	1	4	0	—		61	5
Vasco da Gama	2012	Série A	3	0	6	1	0	0	8	0	—		17	1
Vasco da Gama	Total		57	3	23	4	8	1	12	0	—		100	8
Spartak Moscow	2012–13	Russian Premier League	4	1	—		0	0	3	1	—		7	2
Spartak Moscow	2013–14	Russian Premier League	9	0	—		1	0	0	0	—		10	0
Spartak Moscow	2014–15	Russian Premier League	19	2	—		2	0	—		—		21	2
Spartak Moscow	2015–16	Russian Premier League	21	0	—		0	0	—		—		21	0
Spartak Moscow	2016–17	Russian Premier League	8	0	—		1	0	1	0	—		10	0
Spartak Moscow	Total		61	3	—		4	0	4	1	—		69	4
Flamengo	2017	Série A	8	0	9	0	2	0	5 (Note: Four appearances and one goal in Copa Libertadores and one appearance in Copa Sudamericana.)	1	2 (Note: Appearances in Primeira Liga.)	0	26	1
Flamengo	2018	Série A	7	0	4	0	1	0	1 (Note: Appearance(s) in Copa Libertadores.)	0	—		13	0
Flamengo	Total		15	0	13	0	3	0	6	1	2	0	39	1
Grêmio (loan)	2019	Série A	14	2	10	0	2	0	4	0	—		30	2
Shijiazhuang Ever Bright	2020	Chinese Super League	17	0	—		0	0	—		—		17	0
Vasco da Gama	2021	Série B	16	0	2	0	3	0	—		—		21	0
Retrô	2023	Série D	9	0	8	0	1	0	—		—		18	0
Retrô	2024	Série D	10	0	8	0	2	0	—		1 (Note: Appearances in Copa do Nordeste.)	0	21	0
Retrô	2025	Série C	2	0	5	0	2	0	—		—		9	0
Retrô	Total		21	0	21	0	5	0	—		1	0	48	0
Career total			197	8	69	4	25	1	26	2	3	0	324	15

=== International ===
Brazil national team
Year	Apps	Goals
2011	1	0
2012	7	1
Total	8	1

Statistics accurate as of match played 10 September 2012

=== International goals ===
As of 9 June 2012

#	Date	Venue	Opponent	Score	Result	Competition	Ref
1.	9 June 2012	MetLife Stadium, East Rutherford, United States	Argentina	1–0	3–4	Friendly	

== Honours ==
Vasco da Gama

- Copa do Brasil: 2011

Spartak Moscow

- Russian Premier League: 2016–17

Flamengo

- Campeonato Carioca: 2017

Retrô

- Campeonato Brasileiro Série D: 2024

Brazil

- Superclásico de las Américas: 2011, 2014
- Olympic Silver Medal: 2012
