= Cesinha (footballer, born 1986) =

Brazilian footballer

Personal information
- Full name: César Augusto Pereira Marques
- Date of birth: October 8, 1986 (age 40)
- Place of birth: São José dos Campos, Brazil
- Height: 1.85 m (6 ft 1 in)
- Position: Centre-back

Team information
- Current team: Taubaté

Youth career
- 2005–2006: Santo André

Senior career*
Years	Team	Apps	(Gls)
2007–2010	Santo André	67	(3)
2010–2012	Vasco da Gama	23	(2)
2012	→ Náutico (loan)	7	(1)
2013	XV de Piracicaba	5	(2)
2014	São Paulo-RS	11	(0)
2015	América-RN	0	(0)
2015	Confiança	3	(0)
2017	FC Cascavel	0	(0)
2018	Paranavaí	14	(4)
2018–	Taubaté	27	(1)
- * Club domestic league appearances and goals as of October 16, 2010

Cesar Augusto Pereira Marques (born October 8, 1986), known as Cesinha, is a Brazilian professional footballer who plays as a centre-back for Taubaté.

== Career ==
After participation in Paulistão by Santo André, where he was runners-up in 2010, Cesinha moved to Vasco da Gama. Cesinha won the 2011 Copa do Brasil with Vasco. He retired from playing professional football in October 2016.
