= Jonathan (footballer, born 1991) =

Brazilian footballer

Personal information
- Full name: Jonathan Oliveira Guimarães
- Date of birth: 11 May 1991 (age 35)
- Place of birth: Rio de Janeiro, Brazil
- Height: 1.75 m (5 ft 9 in)
- Position: Forward

Team information
- Current team: Goianésia

Youth career
- 2007: Cruzeiro
- 2008: Friburguense
- 2009–2010: Vasco da Gama

Senior career*
Years	Team	Apps	(Gls)
2010–2013	Vasco da Gama	23	(1)
2013	→ São Bernardo (loan)	0	(0)
2014–2015	Tombense	0	(0)
2014	→ Treze (loan)	11	(0)
2015	Cabofriense	0	(0)
2015	Guarani de Divinopolis	0	(0)
2016	Tupi	30	(4)
2017	Tombense	2	(0)
2018	Nova Iguaçu	0	(0)
2018	Itumbiara	6	(2)
2018	Novo Horizonte	0	(0)
2019	URT	0	(0)
2019	Brusque	0	(0)
2019	Olaria	0	(0)
2020	Bahia de Feira	0	(0)
2020–	Goianésia	0	(0)
- * Club domestic league appearances and goals as of 20:58, 9 April 2020 (UTC)

Jonathan Oliveira Guimarães (born 11 May 1991) is a Brazilian footballer who plays as a forward for Goianésia Esporte Clube.

== Career ==
After impressive displays with the youth ranks of CR Vasco da Gama, Jonathan was promoted to the main squad in 2010 and had excellent displays during the Brazilian League. After the hiring of Ricardo Gomes, he was sent back to the minors to gain more experience, but in June 2011 was promoted back to the senior squad.
