= Max (footballer, born 1990) =

Brazilian footballer

Personal information
- Full name: Marcilei da Silva Elias
- Date of birth: April 28, 1990 (age 36)
- Place of birth: São Paulo, Brazil
- Height: 1.78 m (5 ft 10 in)
- Position: Right-back

Team information
- Current team: Palmas

Youth career
- 1998–2006: Vasco da Gama
- 2007: Ponte Preta
- 2008–2010: Vasco da Gama

Senior career*
Years	Team	Apps	(Gls)
2010–2016	Vasco da Gama	27	(1)
2013	→ Mogi Mirim (loan)	2	(0)
2013	→ Paysandu (loan)	2	(0)
2014	→ Caxias-RS (loan)	5	(0)
2014	→ América-RJ (loan)	10	(0)
2015–	→ Macaé (loan)	22	(2)
2016	→ ABC (loan)	3	(0)
2017	Cabofriense	1	(0)
2018	Portuguesa-RJ	0	(0)
2018	Bangu	2	(0)
2019–	Palmas	3	(1)
- * Club domestic league appearances and goals as of May 16, 2013

Marcil Elias da Silva (born April 28, 1990), known as Max, is a Brazilian footballer who plays as a right-back for Palmas.

== Career ==
On 1 October 2010, Max made the goal of the number in 1500 Vasco in the history of Brazilian Championships.

He is currently playing as defender for Mogi Mirim on loan from Vasco da Gama.

== Career statistics ==
(Correct as of December 3, 2012)

Club	Season	State League		Brazilian Série A		Copa do Brasil		Copa Libertadores		Copa Sudamericana		Total	
Club	Season	Apps	Goals	Apps	Goals	Apps	Goals	Apps	Goals	Apps	Goals	Apps	Goals
Vasco da Gama	2009	-	-	0	0	-	-	-	-	-	-	0	0
Vasco da Gama	2010	0	0	10	1	0	0	-	-	-	-	10	1
Vasco da Gama	2011	1	0	3	0	0	0	-	-	0	0	4	0
Vasco da Gama	2012	5	0	7	0	0	0	1	0	-	-	13	0
Total		6	0	20	1	0	0	1	0	0	0	27	1
