= Gian (footballer, born 1982) =

Brazilian footballer

Personal information
- Full name: Gian Francesco Gonçalves Mariano
- Date of birth: September 19, 1982 (age 44)
- Place of birth: Santo André, Brazil
- Height: 1.90 m (6 ft 3 in)
- Position: Centre back

Team information
- Current team: Mirassol

Senior career*
Years	Team	Apps	(Gls)
2005–2007	Marília	?	(?)
2007–2008	Ipatinga	?	(?)
2009–2012	Vasco da Gama	20	(2)
2010	→ São Caetano (loan)	10	(0)
2011	→ Avaí (loan)	12	(1)
2012	→ Ponte Preta (loan)		
2013–	Mirassol		
- * Club domestic league appearances and goals as of April 16, 2013

Gian Francesco Gonçalves Mariano (September 19, 1982), known only by Gian, is a Brazilian footballer who acts as a defender. Currently playing for Mirassol.

== Career ==
Gian started his career at Rio Branco, Brazil.

The player also had spells at Mogi Mirim, Clube Atlético Juventus São Paulo, Marília and Jaipur.

=== Career statistics ===
(Correct as of October 16, 2010)

Club	Season	State League		Brazilian Série A		Copa do Brasil		Copa Libertadores		Copa Sudamericana		Total	
Club	Season	Apps	Goals	Apps	Goals	Apps	Goals	Apps	Goals	Apps	Goals	Apps	Goals
Vasco da Gama	2009	0	0	0	0	0	0	-	-	-	-	0	0
Vasco da Gama	2010	0	0	0	0	0	0	-	-	-	-	0	0
Total		0	0	0	0	0	0	-	-	-	-	0	0
