= Jeferson Silva =

Brazilian footballer

Personal information
- Full name: Jeferson da Costa Silva
- Date of birth: May 3, 1990 (age 36)
- Place of birth: Nova Iguaçu, Brazil
- Position: Attacking midfielder

Team information
- Current team: Madureira

Youth career
- Nova Iguaçu
- 2008–2010: → Vasco da Gama (loan)

Senior career*
Years	Team	Apps	(Gls)
2010–2013	Vasco da Gama	4	(0)
2011	→ Nova Iguaçu (loan)	1	(0)
2011	→ Salgueiro (loan)		
2012	→ Nova Iguaçu (loan)	6	(0)
2012	→ Duque de Caxias (loan)	11	(2)
2013	→ Velo Clube (loan)	14	(1)
2014	Cuiabá		
2015	Resende	7	(0)
2015–2016	Bangu	6	(1)
2017	Pelotas	9	(0)
2017–	Madureira	1	(0)
- * Club domestic league appearances and goals as of July 20, 2015

Jeferson da Costa Silva (born May 3, 1990 in Nova Iguaçu) is a Brazilian footballer who currently plays for Madureira Esporte Clube.

== Career ==
It started at the base of Nova Iguaçu.

In 2008, he was loaned to Vasco da Gama. In 2010, he signed Vasco on permanent deal.

=== Career statistics ===
(Correct as of October 16, 2010)

Club	Season	State League		Brazilian Série A		Copa do Brasil		Copa Libertadores		Copa Sudamericana		Total	
Club	Season	Apps	Goals	Apps	Goals	Apps	Goals	Apps	Goals	Apps	Goals	Apps	Goals
Vasco da Gama	2010	-	-	1	0	-	-	-	-	-	-	1	0
Total		-	-	1	0	-	-	-	-	-	-	1	0
