= Julio Irrazábal =

Paraguayan footballer (born 1980)

Personal information
- Full name: Julio César Irrazábal León
- Date of birth: 25 November 1980 (age 45)
- Place of birth: San Juan del Paraná, Itapúa, Paraguay
- Height: 1.76 m (5 ft 9 in)
- Position: Right back

Team information
- Current team: Deportivo Capiatá
- Number: 10

Youth career
- Sol de América

Senior career*
| Years | Team | Apps | (Gls) |
| 2001–2002 | Sol de América | | |
| 2003–2004 | River Plate de Asunción | | |
| 2004–2005 | Guaraní | 2 | (0) |
| 2006–2007 | Club Nacional | 3 | (0) |
| 2007 | → Hércules (loan) | 2 | (0) |
| 2008 | San Martín SJ | 11 | (0) |
| 2008–2010 | Cerro Porteño | 56 | (5) |
| 2010–2011 | Vasco da Gama | 13 | (0) |
| 2012 | Sportivo Carapeguá | 33 | (2) |
| 2012 | → Aldosivi (loan) | | |
| 2013–2017 | Deportivo Capiatá | 109 | (20) |
| 2014 | → Sportivo Luqueño (loan) | 6 | (0) |
| 2017–2018 | Cerro Porteño | 13 | (0) |
| 2018– | Deportivo Capiatá | 19 | (0) |

International career
| 2006 | Paraguay | 1 | (0) |
- * Club domestic league appearances and goals as of 21:38, 10 October 2019 (UTC)

Julio César Irrazábal León (born 25 November 1980 in San Juan del Paraná, Itapúa) is a Paraguayan footballer who plays for Deportivo Capiatá.

After playing for clubs in Spain and Argentina, on 26 June 2008 he signed a one-year contract with Cerro Porteño.
