= Cascata =

Neighborhood in Porto Alegre, Brazil

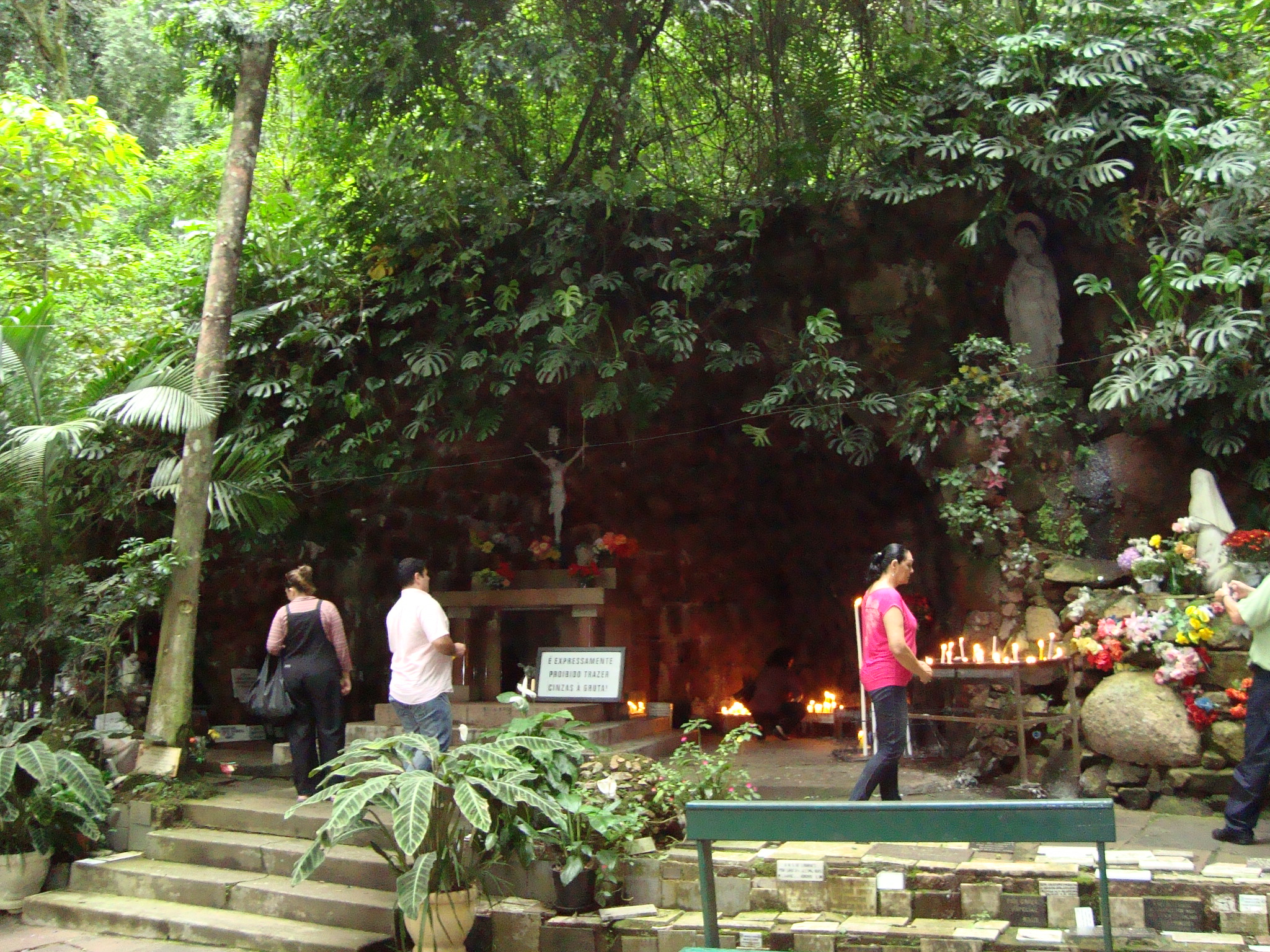
The Grotto of Lourdes.

Cascata (meaning Waterfall in Portuguese) is a neighbourhood in the city of Porto Alegre, the state capital of Rio Grande do Sul, Brazil. It was created by Law 2681 from December 21, 1963, but had its limits modified by Law 7954 from January 8, 1997.
