= Alessandro (footballer, born 1988) =

Brazilian footballer

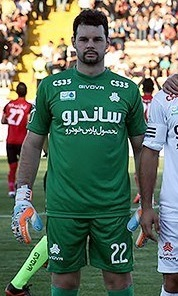

Personal information
- Full name: Alessandro Felipe Oltramari
- Date of birth: March 30, 1988 (age 38)
- Place of birth: Cascavel, Brazil
- Height: 1.91 m (6 ft 3 in)
- Position: Goalkeeper

Team information
- Current team: Machine Sazi F.C.

Youth career
- 2006: Pedrabranca
- 2007: Fluminense
- 2008: Grêmio

Senior career*
Years	Team	Apps	(Gls)
2008–2010	Grêmio	0	(0)
2010–2015	Vasco da Gama	29	(0)
2014	→ Náutico (loan)	30	(0)
2016	Aimoré	8	(0)
2016–2017	Saipa	9	(0)
- * Club domestic league appearances and goals

Alessandro Felipe Oltramari (born March 30, 1988), most commonly known as Alessandro, is a Brazilian goalkeeper.

== Honours ==
Vasco da Gama

- Copa do Brasil: 2011

== Contract ==
- 25 March 2008 to 31 December 2009
