= Fernando Santos (footballer, born 1980) =

Brazilian footballer

Personal information
- Date of birth: 25 February 1980 (age 46)
- Place of birth: Rio de Janeiro, Brazil
- Height: 1.91 m (6 ft 3 in)
- Position: Centre back

Senior career*
| Years | Team | Apps | (Gls) |
| 2000–2003 | Flamengo | 67 | (2) |
| 2004 | 1860 Munich | 10 | (0) |
| 2004 | Austria Wien | 1 | (0) |
| 2005–2006 | Flamengo | 45 | (0) |
| 2007–2008 | MSV Duisburg | 14 | (0) |
| 2008–2011 | Vasco da Gama | 46 | (3) |
| 2011 | Americana | 9 | (0) |
| 2012 | Guarani | 17 | (2) |
| Total | | 209 | (7) |

International career
| 1999 | Brazil U-20 | 0 | (0) |
- * Club domestic league appearances and goals as of 10:31, 12 September 2012 (UTC)

Fernando Santos (born 25 February 1980) is a Brazilian former footballer who played as a defender.

Santos was born in Rio de Janeiro. He was part of the Brazilian squad for 1999 FIFA World Youth Championship but failed to make an appearance during the tournament.

== Career statistics ==
=== Club ===
As of 7 November 2009

Appearances and goals by club, season and competition
| Club | Season | League | | | National Cup | | League Cup | | Continental | | Total | |
| Club | Season | Division | Apps | Goals | Apps | Goals | Apps | Goals | Apps | Goals | Apps | Goals |
|---|---|---|---|---|---|---|---|---|---|---|---|---|
| Vasco da Gama | 2008 | Série A | 7 | 0 | — | — | — | — | — | — | 7 | 0 |
| Vasco da Gama | 2009 | Série B | 7 | 1 | 1 | 0 | 13 | 1 | — | — | 21 | 2 |
| Vasco da Gama | Total | | 14 | 1 | 1 | 0 | 13 | 1 | — | — | 28 | 2 |
| Career total | | | 14 | 1 | 1 | 0 | 13 | 1 | — | — | 28 | 2 |

== Honours ==
- Campeonato Brasileiro Série B: 2009
