= Anderson Martins =

Brazilian footballer (born 1987)

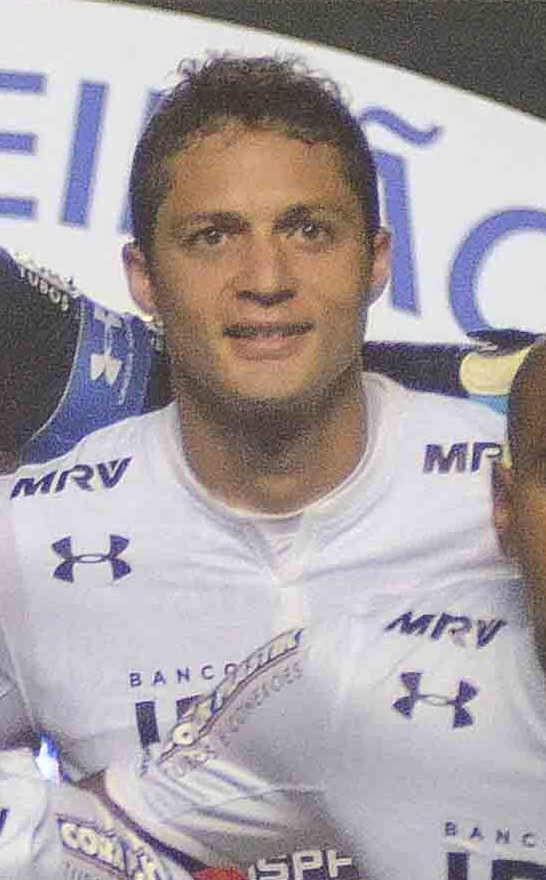

Personal information
- Full name: Anderson Vieira Martins
- Date of birth: 21 August 1987 (age 39)
- Place of birth: Fortaleza, Brazil
- Height: 1.84 m (6 ft 1/2 in)
- Position: Centre-back

Youth career
- 1999–2006: Vitória

Senior career*
Years	Team	Apps	(Gls)
2006–2010	Vitória	145	(0)
2011	Vasco da Gama	40	(1)
2011–2017	El Jaish	61	(8)
2014	→ Corinthians (loan)	21	(1)
2015–2016	→ Al-Gharafa (loan)	22	(0)
2016–2017	→ Umm Salal (loan)	19	(1)
2017	Vasco da Gama	14	(0)
2018–2020	São Paulo	55	(2)
2020–2021	Bahia	10	(1)
2022	CSA	2	(0)

International career
2005	Brazil U18	3	(0)
- * Club domestic league appearances and goals

Anderson Vieira Martins (born 21 August 1987) is a Brazilian former professional footballer who played as a centre-back.

== Club career ==
Born in Fortaleza, capital of Ceará state, Anderson Martins started his career with Bahia club Vitória. In December 2003 he signed a three-year contract and extended in March 2006 and in August 2007. He made his Brazilian Série B debut on 7 August 2007, at that time already known as Anderson Martins to disambiguate with teammates Anderson Ferreira and Anderson Rodrigues. The team promoted to 2008 Campeonato Brasileiro Série A as the fourth place. He played 3 more seasons for Vitória, winning 2008 to 2010 Campeonato Baiano and 2010 Campeonato do Nordeste.

In December 2010 he was signed by Traffic Group as an investment (through subsidiary Desportivo Brasil) and loaned to Vasco da Gama in four-year deal.

In August Traffic Group (which owned the entire contract of Anderson) mutually agreed with him on a 4-year contract with El Jaish of Qatar, despite receiving offers from Portugal, Germany and France. He was persuaded by teammate Juninho who had a stint in Qatar, convincing him that football in Qatar is advanced and that it is a gateway to European clubs. He has stated his desire to join a European club after his contract with Al-Jaish is over.

His arrival to El Jaish was delayed until mid-season. He made his debut on 2 January 2012, scoring a free-kick goal.

On January, 12th, 2018, Martins was appointed for São Paulo. In his interview, defender said he came to Tricolor Paulista because they are "a winner club, I came in a search of titles." He will wear shirt number 4. Twelve days later, Martins made his debut with club, in a victory by 2–0 against Mirassol Futebol Clube, a match valid for São Paulo State League.

== International career ==
He capped 3 times in 2005 Sendai Cup. Brazil was the champion.

== Career statistics ==
As of 1 April 2021

Club	Season	League			State League		Cup		Continental		Other		Total	
Club	Season	Division	Apps	Goals	Apps	Goals	Apps	Goals	Apps	Goals	Apps	Goals	Apps	Goals
Vitória	2006	Série C	0	0	0	0	2	0	—		—		2	0
Vitória	2007	Série B	15	0	2	0	0	0	—		—		17	0
Vitória	2008	Série A	30	0	19	0	3	0	—		—		58	0
Vitória	2009	Série A	23	0	19	0	4	0	2 (Note: Appearance(s) in Copa Sudamericana)	0	—		48	0
Vitória	2010	Série A	22	0	12	0	5	0	2	0	7 (Note: Appearance(s) in Copa do Nordeste)	0	48	0
Vitória	Total		90	0	52	0	14	0	4	0	7	0	167	0
Vasco da Gama	2011	Série A	14	0	14	1	11	0	2	0	—		41	1
El Jaish	2011–12	Qatar Stars League	12	4	—		0	0	—		—		12	4
El Jaish	2012–13	Qatar Stars League	21	1	—		0	0	7 (Note: Appearance(s) in AFC Champions League)	1	—		28	2
El Jaish	2013–14	Qatar Stars League	19	0	—		3	1	5	0	—		27	1
El Jaish	2014–15	Qatar Stars League	9	2	—		0	0	1	0	—		10	2
El Jaish	Total		61	7	—		3	1	13	1	—		77	9
Corinthians (loan)	2014	Série A	17	1	—		4	0	—		—		21	1
Al-Gharafa (loan)	2015–16	Qatar Stars League	22	0	—		0	0	—		—		22	0
Umm Salal (loan)	2016–17	Qatar Stars League	19	1	—		0	0	—		—		19	1
Vasco da Gama	2017	Série A	14	0	—		—		—		—		14	0
São Paulo	2018	Série A	23	1	2	0	2	0	3	0	—		30	1
São Paulo	2019	Série A	11	0	11	1	0	0	0	0	—		22	1
São Paulo	2020	Série A	0	0	3	0	0	0	0	0	—		3	0
São Paulo	Total		34	1	16	1	2	0	3	0	—		55	2
Bahia	2020	Série A	7	1	—		—		3	0	—		10	1
Bahia	2021	Série A	0	0	0	0	0	0	0	0	0	0	0	0
Bahia	Total		7	1	0	0	0	0	3	0	0	0	10	1
Career total			278	11	82	2	34	1	25	1	7	0	426	15

== Honours ==
Vitória

- Campeonato Baiano: 2007, 2008, 2009, 2010
- Copa do Nordeste: 2010

Vasco da Gama

- Copa do Brasil: 2011
