= Élder Granja =

Brazilian footballer

Personal information
- Full name: Élder da Silva Granja
- Date of birth: July 2, 1982 (age 44)
- Place of birth: Santos, Brazil
- Height: 1.81 m (5 ft 11 1/2 in)
- Position: Right wing back

Team information
- Current team: Madureira

Youth career
- 1998–1999: Santos

Senior career*
Years	Team	Apps	(Gls)
2000	Santos		
2001	Atlético Goianiense		
2002	Francisco Beltrão		
2002	Corinthians-AL		
2002	Portuguesa-SP		
2003–2007	Internacional	97	(5)
2008	Palmeiras	18	(1)
2009	Atlético Mineiro	2	(0)
2009	Sport Recife	20	(1)
2010–2011	Vasco da Gama	5	(0)
2010	→ Atlético Paranaense (loan)	9	(0)
2011	→ São Caetano (loan)	7	(0)
2012	Juventude		
2013–	Madureira		
- * Club domestic league appearances and goals

Élder da Silva Granja or simply Élder Granja (born July 2, 1982 in Santos), is a Brazilian right wingback, who currently plays for Madureira.

== Career ==
After terminating his contract with Palmeiras, the right wingback has signed a one-season deal with Clube Atlético Mineiro on 3 April 2009.

== Honours ==
- Rio Grande do Sul State League: 2003, 2004
- Libertadores Cup: 2006
- FIFA Club World Championship: 2006
