= Jéferson (footballer, born 1984) =

Brazilian footballer

Personal information
- Full name: Jéferson Rodrigues Gonçalves
- Date of birth: July 15, 1984 (age 42)
- Place of birth: Brasília, DF, Brazil
- Height: 1.80 m (5 ft 11 in)
- Position: Attacking midfielder

Youth career
- 2003–2004: Brasiliense

Senior career*
Years	Team	Apps	(Gls)
2005	Brasiliense		
2005	→ Atlético Goianiense (loan)	6	(3)
2006–2008	Santo André	36	(14)
2006	→ Guarani (loan)	13	(0)
2009–2011	Vasco da Gama	40	(7)
2010	→ Avaí (loan)	19	(5)
2011	→ Sporting Kansas City (loan)	9	(0)
2012–2013	Bahia	4	(0)
2013	Atlético Goianiense	6	(0)
2014–2015	Boavista	11	(2)
2014	→ América (Natal) (loan)	12	(2)
2015–2016	Vasco da Gama	0	(0)
2016	→ Madureira (loan)	9	(0)
- * Club domestic league appearances and goals as of 2 March 2015

Jéferson Rodrigues Gonçalves (born 15 July 1984), simply Jéferson (Portuguese pronunciation: [ˈʒɛfiʁsõ]), is a Brazilian former footballer who played as an attacking midfielder.

== Career ==
=== Early career ===
Born in Brasília, Distrito Federal, Jéferson debuted as a professional for Brasiliense. He spent four years at the club after being loaned out to Atlético Goianiense. During his short stay with Atlético Goianiense, Jéferson helped the club gain promotion by winning the Campeonato Goiano da Segunda Divisão.

He later spent time with Guarani, a São Paulo based club, after being transferred to Santo André, where he began the ascent of his playing career and leading the squad to a Campeonato Paulista Série A2 championship and runners-up in the 2008 Campeonato Brasileiro Série B campaign.

=== Vasco da Gama ===
Jéferson's role as a playmaker for Santo André caught the attention of more notable Brazilian clubs, in particular, Vasco da Gama, who signed him a year later in 2009. Early on, he struggled to find his place in the squad, due to the bevy of high caliber midfielders at Vasco da Gama. While with Vasco Jéferson enjoyed his best run of form during the Campeonato Carioca, where he made 32 appearances and scored 5 goals.

=== Avaí ===
After struggling to win a starting role, he was subsequently loaned to Avaí, a Brazilian club based in Florianópolis, in 2010. He impressed scoring four goals in his first eight appearances during his short stay with the club.

=== Sporting Kansas City ===
On July 17, 2011, Jéferson signed a loan deal with MLS side Sporting Kansas City. The loan deal also stated that he would be signed under the league's Designated Player Rule making him Sporting KC's second Designated Player alongside Omar Bravo. He was waived by the club on November 23, 2011.

== Honours ==
Brasiliense

- Campeonato Brasiliense: 2005

Atlético Goianiense

- Campeonato Goiano da Segunda Divisão: 2005

Santo André

- Campeonato Brasileiro Série B: 2008
- Campeonato Paulista Série A2: 2008

Vasco da Gama

- Campeonato Brasileiro Série B: 2009
- Copa do Brasil: 2011

Avaí

- Campeonato Catarinense: 2010
