= Márcio Careca =

Brazilian footballer

Personal information
- Full name: Márcio Ferreira
- Date of birth: July 28, 1978 (age 48)
- Place of birth: Duque de Caxias, Brazil
- Height: 1.71 m (5 ft 7 in)
- Position: Left-back

Youth career
- 1996–1998: Nova Iguaçu

Senior career*
Years	Team	Apps	(Gls)
1999–2000	Nova Iguaçu		
2000–2002	Juventus-SP		
2002	São Paulo		
2003	Juventus-SP		
2004	Nova Iguaçu		
2004	Santos	9	(0)
2005	Brasiliense	33	(2)
2006	Palmeiras	14	(1)
2006–2007	Nova Iguaçu		
2007	Paraná Clube	20	(1)
2008–2009	Grêmio Barueri	64	(11)
2010–2012	Vasco da Gama	48	(0)
2010	→ Guarani (loan)	35	(0)
2012	→ Mirassol (loan)	9	(0)
2012	→ Ceará (loan)	36	(2)
2013	Santo André	19	(1)
2014	Marcílio Dias	18	(0)
- * Club domestic league appearances and goals

Márcio Ferreira, better known as Márcio Careca (born July 28, 1978), is a Brazilian former professional footballer who played as a left-back.
