= Renato Augusto (footballer, born 1990) =

Brazilian footballer

Personal information
- Full name: Renato Augusto de Assis Pinto
- Date of birth: July 17, 1990 (age 36)
- Place of birth: Bom Despacho, Brazil
- Height: 1.81 m (5 ft 11 in)
- Position: Midfielder

Team information
- Current team: Rio São Paulo

Youth career
- Cruzeiro
- Tigres do Brasil
- 2007–2010: → Vasco da Gama (loan)

Senior career*
Years	Team	Apps	(Gls)
2010–2014	Vasco da Gama	6	(1)
2011	→ Atlético Goianiense (loan)	3	(0)
2014	→ Ipatinga (loan)	5	(0)
2015–2016	Cabofriense		
2017	Paraíso		
2018	Araguaína		
2019–	Rio São Paulo	7	(0)
- * Club domestic league appearances and goals as of 14:38, 2 December 2019 (UTC)

Renato Augusto de Assis Pinto (born July 17, 1990) is a Brazilian footballer who plays as a defensive midfielder for Rio São Paulo.

== Career ==
Renato Augusto debuted against Corinthians in a game valid for the Brazilian Championship on 13 October 2010. He scored your first goal in a game against Cruzeiro.

== Career statistics ==
(Correct as of October 16, 2010)

Club	Season	State League		Brazilian Série A		Copa do Brasil		Copa Libertadores		Copa Sudamericana		Total	
Club	Season	Apps	Goals	Apps	Goals	Apps	Goals	Apps	Goals	Apps	Goals	Apps	Goals
Vasco da Gama	2010	-	-	5	1	-	-	-	-	-	-	5	1
2012	-	-	1	0	-	-	-	-	-	-	1	0	
Total		-	-	6	1	-	-	-	-	-	-	6	1
