= Éder Luís =

Brazilian footballer

Personal information
- Full name: Éder Luís de Oliveira
- Date of birth: 19 April 1985 (age 41)
- Place of birth: Uberaba, Brazil
- Height: 1.69 m (5 ft 7 in)
- Position: Winger

Youth career
- 2004–2005: Atlético Mineiro

Senior career*
| Years | Team | Apps | (Gls) |
| 2005–2009 | Atlético Mineiro | 161 | (43) |
| 2008 | → São Paulo (loan) | 35 | (5) |
| 2010–2012 | Benfica | 10 | (1) |
| 2010–2011 | → Vasco da Gama (loan) | 59 | (13) |
| 2012–2017 | Vasco da Gama | 171 | (17) |
| 2013–2014 | → Al-Nasr (loan) | 22 | (9) |
| 2018 | Red Bull Brasil | 15 | (4) |
| 2018 | → Ceará (loan) | 13 | (0) |
| 2019 | São Bento | 8 | (2) |
| 2019 | Guarani | 13 | (0) |
- * Club domestic league appearances and goals as of 13 May 2019

Éder Luís de Oliveira (born 19 April 1985), known simply as Éder Luís, is a Brazilian professional footballer who plays as a winger.

== Club career ==
On 29 December 2009, Éder Luís signed with Portuguese club Benfica for the second half of the 2009–10 season. Benfica purchased 50% of the player's rights for two million euros.

In June 2010, he was loaned to Vasco da Gama along with Fellipe Bastos until June 2012.

In June 2012, he signed with Vasco da Gama on a permanent basis.

In August 2013, he was loaned to Al-Nasr for two years. In March 2014, he suffered a severe injury to the meniscus of his right knee.

In May 2015, he was returned from loan to Vasco da Gama.

On 29 December 2017, he signed with Red Bull Brasil.

== Career statistics ==
As of 9 May 2013

| Club | Season | League | | Cup | | Continental | | State League | | Total | |
| Club | Season | Apps | Goals | Apps | Goals | Apps | Goals | Apps | Goals | Apps | Goals |
|---|---|---|---|---|---|---|---|---|---|---|---|
| Atlético Mineiro | 2005 | 1 | 0 | 0 | 0 | 0 | 0 | 0 | 0 | 1 | 0 |
| Atlético Mineiro | 2006 | 7 | 4 | 0 | 0 | 0 | 0 | 0 | 0 | 7 | 4 |
| Atlético Mineiro | 2007 | 33 | 10 | 7 | 1 | 0 | 0 | 14 | 3 | 54 | 14 |
| Atlético Mineiro | 2008 | 0 | 0 | 0 | 0 | 0 | 0 | 4 | 0 | 4 | 0 |
| Atlético Mineiro | 2009 | 35 | 12 | 5 | 0 | 0 | 0 | 17 | 9 | 57 | 21 |
| Atlético Mineiro | Total | 76 | 26 | 12 | 1 | 0 | 0 | 35 | 12 | 123 | 39 |
| São Paulo | 2008 (loan) | 27 | 5 | 0 | 0 | 0 | 0 | - | - | 27 | 5 |
| São Paulo | Total | 27 | 5 | 0 | 0 | 0 | 0 | - | - | 27 | 5 |
| Benfica | 2009–10 | 6 | 1 | 3 | 0 | 1 | 0 | - | - | 10 | 1 |
| Benfica | Total | 6 | 1 | 3 | 0 | 1 | 0 | - | - | 10 | 1 |
| Vasco da Gama | 2010 (loan | 27 | 9 | 0 | 0 | 0 | 0 | 0 | 0 | 27 | 9 |
| Vasco da Gama | 2011 (loan) | 32 | 4 | 10 | 2 | 1 | 0 | 17 | 3 | 60 | 9 |
| Vasco da Gama | 2012 | 27 | 3 | 0 | 0 | 7 | 0 | 8 | 3 | 43 | 6 |
| Vasco da Gama | 2013 | 2 | 0 | 0 | 0 | 0 | 0 | 14 | 2 | 16 | 2 |
| Vasco da Gama | Total | 88 | 16 | 10 | 2 | 8 | 0 | 39 | 8 | 145 | 26 |
| Career Total | | 197 | 36 | 25 | 3 | 9 | 0 | 74 | 20 | 305 | 59 |

== Honours ==
Atlético Mineiro

- Campeonato Brasileiro Série B: 2006
- Campeonato Mineiro: 2007

São Paulo

- Campeonato Brasileiro Série A: 2008

Benfica

- Primeira Liga: 2009–10
- Taça da Liga: 2009–10

Vasco da Gama

- Copa do Brasil: 2011
