= Jumar (footballer) =

Brazilian footballer (born 1986)

Personal information
- Full name: Jumar José da Costa Júnior
- Date of birth: April 28, 1986 (age 40)
- Place of birth: Bandeirantes, Brazil
- Height: 1.72 m (5 ft 8 in)
- Positions: Defensive midfielder; full back

Senior career*
Years	Team	Apps	(Gls)
2004–2006	União Bandeirante	46	(0)
2007–2008	Paraná Clube	35	(1)
2008–2009	Palmeiras	62	(1)
2010–2011	Vasco da Gama	57	(1)
2012–2014	Guangzhou R&F	19	(1)
2015–2017	Londrina	16	(1)
- * Club domestic league appearances and goals as of September 18, 2018

Jumar José da Costa Júnior (born April 28, 1986), commonly known as Jumar, is a Brazilian former footballer who played as a midfielder. He was born in Bandeirantes, Paraná.

== Honours ==
Palmeiras

- Campeonato Paulista: 2008

Vasco da Gama

- Copa do Brasil: 2011

Londrina

- Primeira Liga: 2017
