= 2014 Cruzeiro EC season =

Cruzeiro
2014 season
- Chairman: Gilvan Tavares
- Manager: Marcelo Oliveira
- Stadium: Mineirão
- Campeonato Brasileiro: Champion
- Campeonato Mineiro: Champion
- Copa Libertadores: Quarterfinals
- Copa do Brasil: Runner-up
- Top goalscorer: League: Marcelo Moreno (13); All: Marcelo Moreno (20)
- Highest home attendance: 57,126 vs Goiás (23 November)
- Lowest home attendance: 6,034 vs Guarani (19 February)
Home colours	Away colours

The 2014 season is Cruzeiro's ninety-third season in existence and the club's forty-fourth consecutive season in the top flight of Brazilian football.

== Squad ==
No.	Name	Nationality	Position (s)	Date of birth (age)	Signed from
Goalkeepers
1	Fábio	(Brazil)	GK	30 September 1980 (age 46)	(Brazil) Vasco da Gama
12	Rafael	(Brazil)	GK	23 June 1989 (age 37)	Youth product
24	Alan	(Brazil)	GK	22 June 1994 (age 32)	(Brazil) Londrina
32	Elisson	(Brazil)	GK	26 March 1987 (age 39)	Youth product
Defenders
2	Ceará	(Brazil)	RB	18 June 1980 (age 46)	(France) PSG
3	Léo	(Brazil)	CB	30 January 1988 (age 38)	(Brazil) Palmeiras
4	Bruno Rodrigo	(Brazil)	CB	12 April 1985 (age 41)	(Brazil) Santos
6	Egídio	(Brazil)	LB	16 June 1986 (age 40)	(Brazil) Flamengo
20	Breno Lopes	(Brazil)	LB	28 September 1990 (age 36)	(Brazil) Paraná Clube
21	Samudio	(Paraguay)	LB	24 August 1986 (age 40)	(Paraguay) Club Libertad (on loan)
22	Mayke	(Brazil)	RB	10 November 1992 (age 33)	Youth product
26	Dedé	(Brazil)	CB	1 July 1988 (age 38)	(Brazil) Vasco da Gama
30	Alex	(Brazil)	CB	21 January 1993 (age 33)	Youth product
33	Manoel	(Brazil)	CB	26 February 1990 (age 36)	(Brazil) Atlético-PR
Midfielders
7	Tinga	(Brazil)	CM / DM	13 January 1978 (age 48)	(Brazil) Internacional
8	Henrique	(Brazil)	DM / CM	16 May 1985 (age 41)	(Brazil) Santos
10	Júlio Baptista	(Brazil)	AM / CF / ST	1 October 1981 (age 45)	(Spain) Málaga CF
15	Willian Farias	(Brazil)	DM	6 June 1989 (age 37)	(Brazil) Coritiba
16	Lucas Silva	(Brazil)	CM / LM	16 February 1993 (age 33)	Youth product
17	Éverton Ribeiro	(Brazil)	AM / LM	10 April 1989 (age 37)	(Brazil) Coritiba
19	Nílton	(Brazil)	DM	21 April 1987 (age 39)	(Brazil) Vasco da Gama
23	Marlone	(Brazil)	AM / RW	2 April 1992 (age 34)	(Brazil) Vasco da Gama
28	Ricardo Goulart	(Brazil)	AM / ST	5 May 1991 (age 35)	(Brazil) Goiás
29	Alisson	(Brazil)	AM	25 June 1993 (age 33)	Youth product
31	Eurico	(Brazil)	DM	16 April 1994 (age 32)	Youth product
34	Marquinhos	(Brazil)	AM / SS / W	19 October 1989 (age 37)	(Brazil) Vitória
Forwards
9	Borges	(Brazil)	ST	5 October 1980 (age 46)	(Brazil) Santos
11	Dagoberto	(Brazil)	CF / ST	22 March 1983 (age 43)	(Brazil) Internacional
18	Marcelo Moreno	(Bolivia)	ST	18 June 1987 (age 39)	(Brazil) Grêmio (on loan)
25	Willian	(Brazil)	CF / ST	19 November 1986 (age 39)	(Ukraine) Metalist Kharkiv
35	Neílton	(Brazil)	SS / W	17 February 1994 (age 32)	(Brazil) Santos

Source: Cruzeiro Official Web Site

=== Under-20 players called up to professional squad ===
No.	Name	Nationality	Position (s)	Date of birth (age)	Signed from
13	Hugo Ragelli	(Brazil)	FW	2 May 1995 (age 31)	Youth product
14	Judivan	(Brazil)	FW	21 May 1995 (age 31)	Youth product
	Rodrigo Dias	(Brazil)	FW	26 January 1994 (age 32)	Youth product

== Statistics ==
=== Appearances and goals ===
Number	Pos.	Nat	Name	Campeonato Mineiro		Copa Libertadores		Copa do Brasil		Campeonato Brasileiro		Total	
Number	Pos.	Nat	Name	Apps	Goals	Apps	Goals	Apps	Goals	Apps	Goals	Apps	Goals
1	GK	(Brazil)	Fábio	13	0	10	0	4	0	30	0	57	0
2	DF	(Brazil)	Ceará	8 (1)	0	9	0	3	0	11 (3)	0	31 (4)	0
3	DF	(Brazil)	Léo	5	2	1 (1)	0	2 (1)	1	22	2	30 (2)	5
4	DF	(Brazil)	Bruno Rodrigo	10	2	9	4	0	0	7	0	26	6
6	DF	(Brazil)	Egídio	6	0	5 (1)	0	2	0	25	0	38 (1)	0
7	MF	(Brazil)	Tinga	4 (1)	0	0 (2)	0	0	0	3 (3)	0	7 (6)	0
8	MF	(Brazil)	Henrique	7 (2)	0	6	0	2	2	24 (1)	0	39 (3)	2
9	FW	(Brazil)	Borges	2 (1)	0	0 (4)	0	2	0	5 (5)	2	9 (10)	2
10	MF	(Brazil)	Júlio Baptista	7 (4)	3	7 (1)	2	2	2	4 (5)	4	20 (10)	11
11	FW	(Brazil)	Dagoberto	7	4	6 (3)	2	2	0	3 (17)	3	18 (20)	9
12	GK	(Brazil)	Rafael	0	0	0	0	0	0	0	0	0	0
13	FW	(Brazil)	Hugo Ragelli	0	0	0	0	0	0	0 (1)	1	0 (1)	1
14	FW	(Brazil)	Judivan	0	0	0	0	0	0	0 (1)	0	0 (1)	0
15	MF	(Brazil)	Willian Farias	0 (2)	0	0	0	3 (1)	0	3 (5)	0	6 (8)	0
16	MF	(Brazil)	Lucas Silva	8 (1)	0	8	0	1	0	20 (1)	1	37 (2)	1
17	MF	(Brazil)	Everton Ribeiro	9	1	10	1	0	0	24	4	43	6
18	FW	(Bolivia)	Marcelo Moreno	4 (5)	4	4	0	1 (2)	3	23 (2)	13	32 (9)	20
19	MF	(Brazil)	Nilton	4 (3)	0	3	0	3	0	11 (8)	2	21 (11)	2
20	DF	(Brazil)	Breno Lopes	0	0	0	0	0	0	0	0	0	0
21	DF	(Paraguay)	Samudio	5 (1)	0	5	2	1 (1)	0	3 (2)	0	14 (4)	2
22	DF	(Brazil)	Mayke	6 (3)	1	1 (1)	0	1 (1)	0	21 (4)	0	29 (9)	1
23	MF	(Brazil)	Marlone	4 (5)	1	0 (3)	0	2 (2)	0	6 (5)	0	12 (15)	1
24	GK	(Brazil)	Alan	0	0	0	0	0	0	0	0	0	0
25	FW	(Brazil)	Willian	9 (4)	3	4 (5)	1	3	1	11 (10)	1	27 (19)	6
26	DF	(Brazil)	Dedé	11	1	10	1	2	1	19	2	42	5
28	MF	(Brazil)	Ricardo Goulart	10	1	8 (1)	4	0 (1)	0	19 (1)	11	37 (3)	16
29	MF	(Brazil)	Alisson	0 (5)	1	0 (1)	0	2	0	8 (7)	3	10 (13)	4
30	DF	(Brazil)	Alex	0	0	0	0	1	0	0	0	1	0
31	MF	(Brazil)	Eurico	0 (1)	0	0	0	0 (1)	0	0 (1)	0	0 (3)	0
32	GK	(Brazil)	Elisson	2	0	0	0	0	0	0	0	2	0
33	DF	(Brazil)	Manoel	0	0	0	0	4	0	9 (1)	1	13 (1)	1
34	MF	(Brazil)	Marquinhos	0	0	0	0	0	0	12 (2)	2	12 (2)	2
35	FW	(Brazil)	Neílton	0	0	0	0	1 (2)	0	0	0	1 (2)	0
	MF	(Brazil)	Élber	3 (4)	0	1 (2)	0	0	0	0 (1)	0	4 (7)	0
	FW	(Brazil)	Luan	5 (1)	0	0 (1)	0	0	0	2 (2)	0	7 (4)	0
	FW	(Argentina)	Martinuccio	0	0	0	0	0	0	0 (1)	0	0 (1)	0
	MF	(Brazil)	Rodrigo Souza	5	0	2 (1)	0	0	0	0	0	7 (1)	0
	MF	(Brazil)	Souza	7 (1)	1	1 (2)	0	0	0	3 (2)	1	11 (5)	2
	DF	(Brazil)	Wallace	4	0	0	0	0	0	3	0	7	0

Last updated: 22 Out 2014
Source: Match reports in Competitive matches

=== Starting XI ===
4–5–1 Formation

No.	Pos.	Nat.	Name	MS	Notes
1	GK	(Brazil)	Fábio	57	
2	DF	(Brazil)	Ceará	31	Mayke has 29 starts.
26	DF	(Brazil)	Dedé	42	
3	DF	(Brazil)	Léo	30	Bruno Rodrigo has 26 starts.
6	DF	(Brazil)	Egídio	38	
8	MF	(Brazil)	Henrique	39	Nilton has 21 starts.
16	MF	(Brazil)	Lucas Silva	37	
17	MF	(Brazil)	Everton Ribeiro	43	
28	MF	(Brazil)	Ricardo Goulart	37	
25	MF	(Brazil)	Willian	27	Dagoberto has 18 starts.
18	FW	(Bolivia)	Marcelo Moreno	32	Júlio Baptista has 20 starts.

Last updated: 22 Out 2014
Source: Squad statistics and Start formations
Only competitive matches.
Using the most used start formation.
Ordered by position on pitch (from back right to front left).

=== Goal scorers ===
No.	Pos.	Name	Campeonato Mineiro	Copa Libertadores	Copa do Brasil	Campeonato Brasileiro	Total
18	FW	Marcelo Moreno	4	0	3	13	20
28	MF	Ricardo Goulart	1	4	0	11	16
10	MF	Júlio Baptista	3	2	2	4	11
11	FW	Dagoberto	4	2	0	3	9
25	FW	Willian	3	1	2	1	7
4	DF	Bruno Rodrigo	2	4	0	0	6
17	MF	Everton Ribeiro	1	1	0	4	6
3	DF	Léo	2	0	1	2	5
26	DF	Dedé	1	1	1	2	5
29	MF	Alisson	1	0	0	3	4
34	DF	Marquinhos	0	0	0	4	4
8	MF	Henrique	0	0	2	0	2
9	FW	Borges	0	0	0	2	2
19	MF	Nilton	0	0	0	2	2
21	DF	Samudio	0	2	0	0	2
	MF	Souza	1	0	0	1	2
6	DF	Egídio	0	0	0	1	1
16	MF	Lucas Silva	0	0	0	1	1
22	MF	Mayke	1	0	0	0	1
23	MF	Marlone	1	0	0	0	1
33	DF	Manoel	0	0	0	1	1
Own goals			2	0	0	1	3
TOTAL			27	17	11	56	111

Last updated: 2 Nov 2014

=== Disciplinary record ===
Includes all competitive matches.

N	P	Nat.	Name	Mineiro			Libertadores			Copa do Brasil			Brasileiro			Total			Notes
N	P	Nat.	Name	Yellow card	Second yellow card	Red card	Yellow card	Second yellow card	Red card	Yellow card	Second yellow card	Red card	Yellow card	Second yellow card	Red card	Yellow card	Second yellow card	Red card	Notes
1	GK	(Brazil)	Fábio							1			1			2			
2	DF	(Brazil)	Ceará	1			2						2			5			
3	DF	(Brazil)	Léo										2			2			
4	DF	(Brazil)	Bruno Rodrigo				1	1								1	1		
6	DF	(Brazil)	Egídio	1			2						2			5			
7	MF	(Brazil)	Tinga	1			1						1			3			
8	MF	(Brazil)	Henrique	1			1						8			10			
9	FW	(Brazil)	Borges																
10	MF	(Brazil)	Júlio Baptista	1									1			2			
11	FW	(Brazil)	Dagoberto	3			2			1			2			8			
12	GK	(Brazil)	Rafael																
15	MF	(Brazil)	Willian Farias										2			2			
16	MF	(Brazil)	Lucas Silva	1									6			7			
17	MF	(Brazil)	Everton Ribeiro	3			1						3			7			
18	FW	(Bolivia)	Marcelo Moreno	1											1	1		1	
19	MF	(Brazil)	Nilton	1					1	1			3			5		1	
20	DF	(Brazil)	Breno Lopes																
21	DF	(Paraguay)	Samudio	2			1	1					2			5	1		
22	DF	(Brazil)	Mayke										2			2			
23	MF	(Brazil)	Marlone										1			1			
24	GK	(Brazil)	Alan																
25	FW	(Brazil)	Willian	5									3			8			
26	DF	(Brazil)	Dedé	3			2			1			6			12			
28	FW	(Brazil)	Ricardo Goulart										3			3			
29	MF	(Brazil)	Alisson	1						1			2			4			
30	DF	(Brazil)	Alex																
31	MF	(Brazil)	Eurico																
32	GK	(Brazil)	Elisson																
33	DF	(Brazil)	Manoel										1			1			
34	MF	(Brazil)	Marquinhos										3			3			
35	FW	(Brazil)	Neílton																
	MF	(Brazil)	Élber																
	FW	(Brazil)	Luan				1						1		1	2		1	
	FW	(Argentina)	Martinuccio																
	MF	(Brazil)	Rodrigo Souza	1			1									2			
	MF	(Brazil)	Souza	2									1			3			
	DF	(Brazil)	Wallace	1									1			2			

Last updated: 2 Nov 2014
Ordered by (red card) , (second yellow card) and (yellow card)
(yellow card) = Number of bookings; (second yellow card) = Number of sending offs after a second yellow card; (red card) = Number of sending offs by a direct red card.

== Club ==
=== Coaching staff ===
Position	Name	Nationality
Head coach	Marcelo Oliveira	Brazilian
Assistant coaches	Ageu Gonçalves de Siqueira	Brazilian
Assistant coaches	Tico	Brazilian
Goalkeeping coach	Robertinho	Brazilian
Fitness coaches	Quintiliano Lemos	Brazilian
Fitness coaches	Eduardo Freitas	Brazilian
Fitness coaches	Juvenilson de Souza	Brazilian
Physiologists	Eduardo Pimenta	Brazilian
Physiologists	Rodrigo Morandi	Brazilian
Physiotherapists	André Rocha	Brazilian
Physiotherapists	Charles Costa	Brazilian
Physiotherapists	Ronner Bolognani	Brazilian
Physiotherapists	João Salomão	Brazilian
Doctors	Sérgio Freire Júnior	Brazilian
Doctors	Walace Espada	Brazilian
Doctors	Leonardo Corradi	Brazilian
Masseurs	Barjão	Brazilian
Masseurs	Hélio Gomes	Brazilian

== Transfers ==
=== In ===
Position	Player	Transferred From	Fee	Date	Source
GK	(Brazil) Alan	(Brazil) Londrina			
DF	(Paraguay) Miguel Samudio	(Paraguay) Club Libertad	On loan	13 December 2013	
DF	(Brazil) Alex	Youth project	Promoted	9 January 2014	
DF	(Brazil) Manoel	(Brazil) Atlético-PR		2 June 2014	
DF	(Brazil) Breno Lopes	(Brazil) Paraná Clube		21 September 2014	
MF	(Brazil) Marlone	(Brazil) Vasco da Gama		16 December 2013	
MF	(Brazil) Rodrigo Souza	(Brazil) Boa Esporte		20 December 2013	
MF	(Brazil) Eurico	Youth product	Promoted	20 January 2014	
MF	(Brazil) Willian Farias	(Brazil) Coritiba		26 February 2014	
MF	(Brazil) Marquinhos	(Brazil) Vitória		5 June 2014	
FW	(Bolivia) Marcelo Moreno	(Brazil) Grêmio	On loan	9 January 2014	
FW	(Brazil) Neílton	(Brazil) Santos		5 June 2014	

=== Out ===
Position	Player	Transferred To	Fee	Date	Source
DF	(Brazil) Paulão	(China) Guangzhou Evergrande	Loan return	16 December 2013	
DF	(Uruguay) Mauricio Victorino	(Brazil) Palmeiras	On loan	9 January 2014	
DF	(Brazil) Everton	(Brazil) Criciúma	On loan	17 January 2014	
DF	(Brazil) Wallace	(Portugal) Braga	€9,5 million	30 June 2014	
MF	(Brazil) Leandro Guerreiro		End of contract	16 December 2013	
MF	(Brazil) Rodrigo Souza	(Brazil) Criciúma	On loan	14 April 2014	
MF	(Brazil) Élber	(Brazil) Coritiba	On loan	4 Jun 2014	
MF	(Brazil) Souza	(Brazil) Santos	On loan	5 Jun 2014	
FW	(Brazil) Lucca	(Brazil) Criciúma	On loan	15 January 2014	
FW	(Brazil) Vinícius Araújo	(Spain) Valencia CF	€3,5 million	31 January 2014	
FW	(Brazil) Anselmo Ramon	(China) Hangzhou Greentown	On loan	7 February 2014	
FW	(Argentina) Martinuccio	(Brazil) Fluminense	Loan return	30 May 2014	
FW	(Brazil) Luan		Loan termination	16 June 2014	

=== Overview ===
Competition	First match	Last match	Starting round	Final position	Record							
Competition	First match	Last match	Starting round	Final position	Pld	W	D	L	GF	GA	GD	Win %
Série A	20 April 2014	7 December 2014	Matchday 1	Winners	38	24	8	6	67	38	+29	63.16
Copa do Brasil	27 August 2014	26 November 2014	Round of 16	Runners-up	8	4	1	3	14	10	+4	50.00
Campeonato Mineiro	26 January 2014	13 April 2014	Matchday 1	Winners	15	11	4	0	27	5	+22	73.33
Copa Libertadores	12 February 2014	14 May 2014	Group stage	Quarter-finals	10	4	3	3	17	10	+7	40.00
Total					71	43	16	12	125	63	+62	60.56

Source: Competitions

== Friendlies ==
22 June	Cruzeiro	5–1	(United States) Miami Dade FC	(United States) Framingham
	Júlio Baptista 17'; Manoel 22'; Marlone 26', 44', 56'	Report	Hurtado 60'	Stadium: Bowditch Field

24 June	Cruzeiro	2–1	(United States) Miami Dade FC	(United States) Lawrence
	Lucas Silva 28'; Egídio 73'	Report	Paulinho 57'	Stadium: Veterans Memorial Stadium; Referee: (United States) Boris Senic Marin

27 June	Cruzeiro	5–3	(Mexico) América	(United States) Dallas
	Ricardo Goulart 13'; Alisson 28'; Everton Ribeiro 38'; Marcelo Moreno 46'; Willian 67'	Report	Mendoza 2'; Martínez 49'; Valenzuela 55'	Stadium: Cotton Bowl; Referee: (United States) Sorin Stoica

3 July	Cruzeiro	2–0	(Mexico) Tigres	(United States) Houston
	Ricardo Goulart 70', 82'	Report		Stadium: BBVA Compass Stadium; Referee: (United States) José Carlos Rivero

6 July	Cruzeiro	2–0	(Mexico) Chivas Guadalajara	(United States) El Paso
	Willian 28'; Ricardo Goulart 82'	Report		Stadium: Sun Bowl Stadium; Referee: (United States) Jair Manufo

== Competitions ==
=== Campeonato Mineiro ===
==== First stage ====
Overall								Home						Away					
Pld	W	D	L	GF	GA	GD	Pts	W	D	L	GF	GA	GD	W	D	L	GF	GA	GD
11	9	2	0	24	4	+20	29	6	0	0	14	2	+12	3	2	0	10	2	+8

26 January 1	Cruzeiro	1–0	URT	Belo Horizonte
17:00 UTC−02:00	Ricardo Goulart 43'	Report	Marcel (yellow card) 41'; Diogo Marzagão (yellow card) 78'	Stadium: Mineirão; Attendance: 11,843; Referee: Marcos Vinícius de Sá dos Santos

1 February 2	Caldense	0–0	Cruzeiro	Poços de Caldas
19:30 UTC−02:00	Diney (yellow card) 37'; Michel (yellow card) 82'; Ewerton Maradona (yellow card) 82'	Report	Souza (yellow card) 71'	Stadium: Ronaldão; Attendance: 2,036; Referee: Cleisson Veloso Pereira

5 February 3	Cruzeiro	3–1	Villa Nova	Belo Horizonte
19:30 UTC−02:00	Fábio Fidelis 10' (o.g.); Dagoberto 33'; Marcelo Moreno 40'	Report	João Paulo (yellow card) 22'; Mancini 74'	Stadium: Mineirão; Attendance: 8,074; Referee: Igor Junio Benevenuto

9 February 4	Cruzeiro	2–0	América	Belo Horizonte
17:00 UTC−02:00	Wallace (yellow card) 7'; Léo 31', 43'; Alisson (yellow card) 88'; Henrique (yellow card) 90'	Report	Leandro Guerreiro (yellow card) 42'; Obina (yellow card) 48'	Stadium: Mineirão; Attendance: 12,571; Referee: Wanderson Alves de Souza

16 February 5	Atlético	0–0	Cruzeiro	Belo Horizonte
16:00 UTC−03:00	Ronaldinho (yellow card) 38'; Otamendi (yellow card) 58'; Jô (yellow card) 89'; Pierre (yellow card) 90+2'	Report	Dagoberto (yellow card) 29'; Willian (yellow card) 54'; Dedé (yellow card) 58'; Ceará (yellow card) 76'	Stadium: Independência; Attendance: 18,231; Referee: Igor Junio Benevenuto

19 February 6	Cruzeiro	2–0	Guarani	Belo Horizonte
22:00 UTC−03:00	Willian 3', 69'; Rodrigo Souza (yellow card) 23'; Dedé (yellow card) 63'	Report	Murilo (yellow card) 11'; Thiago Carpini (yellow card) 64'	Stadium: Mineirão; Attendance: 6,304; Referee: Marco Aurélio Augusto Fazekas Ferreira

23 February 7	Boa Esporte	1–3	Cruzeiro	Varginha
18:30 UTC−03:00	Bruno Aquino 38'; Neylor (yellow card) 70'	Report	Marcelo Moreno 29', 65'; Souza (yellow card) 74'; Júlio Baptista 90+1'	Stadium: Melão; Referee: Ricardo Marques Ribeiro

1 March 8	Cruzeiro	4–0	Minas Boca	Belo Horizonte
16:00 UTC−03:00	Everton Ribeiro (yellow card) 10'; Bruno Rodrigo 33'; Dagoberto 39', 51' (pen.); Egídio (yellow card) 67'; Everton Ribeiro 70'; Dedé (yellow card) 71'	Report	Gustavo Alves (yellow card) 52'	Stadium: Mineirão; Attendance: 9,444; Referee: Gabriel Murta Barbosa Maciel

5 March 9	Nacional	1–4	Cruzeiro	Muriaé
19:30 UTC−03:00	Américo (yellow card) 52'; Patrick 70'	Report	Iuri 10' (o.g.); Marlone 33'; Tinga (yellow card) 42'; Willian 61'; Willian (yellow card) 66'; Souza 73' (pen.)	Stadium: Estádio Soares de Azevedo; Attendance: 5,452; Referee: Wanderson Alves de Souza

8 March 10	Cruzeiro	2–1	Tupi	Belo Horizonte
18:30 UTC−03:00	Marcelo Moreno 21'; Willian (yellow card) 62'; Nilton (yellow card) 75'; Dedé 79'	Report	Toledo 16'; Magnum (yellow card) 69'; Toledo (yellow card) 71'; Hélder (yellow card) 87'; Fabrício (yellow card) 87'; Henrique (yellow card) 89'	Stadium: Mineirão; Attendance: 11,624; Referee: Igor Junio Benevenuto

16 March 11	Tombense	0–3	Cruzeiro	Tombos
16:00 UTC−03:00		Report	Samudio (yellow card) 26'; Júlio Baptista 33'; Mayke 37'; Alisson 85'	Stadium: Estádio Antônio Guimarães de Almeida; Referee: Ronei Cândido Alves

==== Semi-finals ====
23 March First leg	Boa Esporte	0–1	Cruzeiro	Varginha
18:30 UTC−03:00	Vinícius Ress (yellow card) 59'	Report	Lucas Silva (yellow card) 30'; Willian (yellow card) 54'; Júlio Baptista (yellow card) 80', (goal) 87'	Stadium: Melão; Referee: Igor Junio Benevenuto

30 March Second leg	Cruzeiro	2–1 (3–1 agg.)	Boa Esporte	Belo Horizonte
16:00 UTC−03:00	Dagoberto 30' (pen.), (yellow card) 85'; Willian (yellow card) 38'; Bruno Rodrigo 62'	Report	Betinho (yellow card) 16'; Leandro (yellow card) 30'; Marcel (yellow card) 40'; Mateus 52'; Moisés Ribeiro (yellow card) 65'; Francismar (yellow card) 71'	Stadium: Mineirão; Attendance: 12,587; Referee: Frederico Soares Vilarinho

==== Finals ====
6 April First leg	Atlético	0–0	Cruzeiro	Belo Horizonte
16:00 UTC−03:00	Leonardo Silva (yellow card) 75'; Marcos Rocha (yellow card) 89'; Victor (yellow card) 89'	Report	Everton Ribeiro (yellow card) 61'; Marcelo Moreno (yellow card) 89'	Stadium: Independência; Referee: Francisco Carlos do Nascimento

13 April Second leg	Cruzeiro	0–0 (0–0 agg.)	Atlético	Belo Horizonte
16:00 UTC−03:00	Samudio (yellow card) 61'; Dagoberto (yellow card) 74'; Everton Ribeiro (yellow card) 86'	Report	Leandro Donizete (yellow card) 41'; Michel (yellow card) 68'; Pierre (yellow card) 70'; Neto Berola (yellow card) 86'	Stadium: Mineirão; Attendance: 48,818; Referee: Leandro Vuaden
Note: Cruzeiro had the most points in the First Stage and won the championship with two draws.

=== Copa Libertadores ===
==== Group 5 ====
Pos	Team	Pld	W	D	L	GF	GA	GD	Pts	DEF	CRU	UCH	GAR
1	(Uruguay) Defensor Sporting	6	3	2	1	11	5	+6	11		2–0	1–1	4–1
2	(Brazil) Cruzeiro	6	3	1	2	13	7	+6	10	2–2		5–1	3–0
3	Universidad de Chile	6	3	1	2	6	9	−3	10	1–0	0–2		1–0
4	(Peru) Real Garcilaso	6	1	0	5	4	13	−9	3	0–2	2–1	1–2	

Legend: Blue = home team win; Yellow = draw; Red = away team win.

12 February 1	Real Garcilaso (Peru)	2−1	Cruzeiro	Huancayo
22:00 UTC−03:00	Herrera (yellow card) 35'; Brítez 52'; R. Rodríguez 62'; Flores (yellow card) 66'; Retamoso (yellow card) 86'	Report	Bruno Rodrigo 20'; Egídio (yellow card) 21'	Stadium: Estadio Huancayo; Referee: (Venezuela) José Argote

25 February 2	Cruzeiro	5−1	Universidad de Chile	Belo Horizonte
17:30 UTC−03:00	Ricardo Goulart 33', 42', 84'; Dagoberto 38'; Willian 89'	Report	Lorenzetti 65'	Stadium: Mineirão; Attendance: 27,757; Referee: (Argentina) Saúl Laverni

11 March 3	Defensor Sporting (Uruguay)	2−0	Cruzeiro	Montevideo
19:00 UTC−03:00	Arias (yellow card) 50' (yellow-red card) 68'; Gedoz 63', 77'; Zeballos (yellow card) 86'	Report	Ceará (yellow card) 4'; Rodrigo Souza (yellow card) 62'; Dagoberto (penalty missed); Everton Ribeiro (yellow card) 76'; Tinga (yellow card) 80'	Stadium: Estadio Luis Franzini; Referee: (Argentina) Diego Abal

20 March 4	Cruzeiro	2−2	(Uruguay) Defensor Sporting	Belo Horizonte
22:00 UTC−03:00	Dagoberto (yellow card) 22'; Bruno Rodrigo (yellow card) 40'; Nilton (red card) 45+2'; Everton Ribeiro 45+4'; Júlio Baptista 62'	Report	Zeballos (yellow card) 6', (goal) 90+3'; Malvino (red card) 45+2'; Correa (yellow card) 45+6'; Gedoz 65'	Stadium: Mineirão; Attendance: 37,310; Referee: (Argentina) Mauro Vigliano

3 April 5	Universidad de Chile	0−2	Cruzeiro	Santiago
20:45 UTC−03:00	J. M. Rojas (yellow card) 75'; Caruzzo (yellow card) 79', (red card) 84'	Report	Henrique (yellow card) 7'; Bruno Rodrigo 16'; Ceará (yellow card) 31'; Samudio 39', (yellow card) 66' (yellow-red card) 86'	Stadium: Estadio Nacional; Referee: (Argentina) Germán Raúl Delfino

9 April 6	Cruzeiro	3−0	(Peru) Real Garcilaso	Belo Horizonte
22:00 UTC−03:00	Ricardo Goulart 23'; Bruno Rodrigo 26'; Egídio (yellow card) 33'; Júlio Baptista 41'	Report	Huerta (yellow card) 20'; Herrera (yellow card) 25'; Santillán (yellow card) 54'; Lojas (yellow card) 64'	Stadium: Mineirão; Attendance: 42,775; Referee: (Colombia) Adrian Vélez

==== Round of 16 ====
16 April First leg	Cruzeiro	1−1	(Paraguay) Cerro Porteño	Belo Horizonte
22:00 UTC−03:00	Samudio 90+3'	Report	Á. Romero 31'; Güiza (yellow card) 82'; Candia (yellow card) 90+3'	Stadium: Mineirão; Attendance: 36,583; Referee: (Uruguay) Daniel Fedorczuk

30 April Second leg	Cerro Porteño (Paraguay)	0−2 (1–3 agg.)	Cruzeiro	Asunción
22:00 UTC−03:00	Corujo (red card) 84'; Güiza (red card) 84'	Report	Bruno Rodrigo (yellow card) 18' (yellow-red card) 77'; Dedé (yellow card) 21', (goal) 79'; Samudio (yellow card) 53'; Luan (yellow card) 71'; Dagoberto 90+3'	Stadium: Estadio General Pablo Rojas; Referee: (Uruguay) Darío Ubriaco

==== Quarterfinals ====
7 May First leg	San Lorenzo (Argentina)	1–0	Cruzeiro	Buenos Aires
22:00 UTC−03:00	Gentiletti (yellow card) 40', (goal) 64'; Navarro (yellow card) 86'	Report	Dagoberto (yellow card) 89'	Stadium: Estadio Pedro Bidegain; Referee: (Paraguay) Antonio Arias

14 May Second leg	Cruzeiro	1–1 (1–2 agg.)	(Argentina) San Lorenzo	Belo Horizonte
22:00 UTC−03:00	Dedé (yellow card) 20'; Bruno Rodrigo 70'	Report	Piatti 9'; Mercier (yellow card) 45+1'; Matos (yellow card) 49'; Kannemann (yellow card) 68'; Romagnoli (red card) 76'; Torrico (yellow card) 90+3'	Stadium: Mineirão; Attendance: 41,986; Referee: (Uruguay) Martín Vázquez

=== Campeonato Brasileiro ===
==== Results summary ====
Overall								Home						Away					
Pld	W	D	L	GF	GA	GD	Pts	W	D	L	GF	GA	GD	W	D	L	GF	GA	GD
38	24	8	6	67	38	+29	80	15	2	2	43	17	+26	9	6	4	24	21	+3

==== Matches ====
20 April 1	Bahia	1–2	Cruzeiro	Salvador
16:00 UTC−03:00	Fahel (yellow card) 39'; Rhayner (yellow card) 40'; Pará (yellow card) 59'; Titi (yellow card) 77'; Talisca 80' (pen.)	Report	Nilton (yellow card) 21', (goal) 62'; Willian (yellow card) 45+1'; Tinga (yellow card) 47'; Marcelo Moreno 89'; Willian Farias (yellow card) 90'	Stadium: Arena Fonte Nova; Attendance: 8,913; Referee: Luiz Flávio de Oliveira

27 April 2	Cruzeiro	1−1	São Paulo	Uberlândia
16:00 UTC−03:00	Júlio Baptista 50'; Henrique (yellow card) 69'; Samudio (yellow card) 90'	Report	Álvaro Pereira (yellow card) 21'; Antônio Carlos 90+1'	Stadium: Parque do Sabiá; Referee: Wagner do Nascimento Magalhães

4 May 3	Atlético Paranaense	2−3	Cruzeiro	Brasília
18:30 UTC−03:00	Éderson 23'; Cleberson (yellow card) 26'; Marcelo 40'; Dráusio (red card) 46'; Wéverton (yellow card) 59'; Natanael (yellow card) 73'	Report	Nilton 35'; Luan (yellow card) 70'; Souza 74' (pen.), (yellow card) 90+1'; Wallace (yellow card) 77'; Marcelo Moreno 82'	Stadium: Mané Garrincha; Attendance: 12,093; Referee: Elmo Alves Resende Cunha

11 May 4	Atlético Mineiro	2−1	Cruzeiro	Belo Horizonte
16:00 UTC−03:00	André (yellow card) 20', (goal) 70' (pen.); Victor (yellow card) 49'; Leandro Donizete (yellow card) 52'; Leonardo Silva (yellow card) 52'; Marion 54'; Alex Silva (yellow card) 90+1'	Report	Marcelo Moreno 37', (red card) 90+3'; Marlone (yellow card) 38'; Léo (yellow card) 69'; Luan (red card) 75'	Stadium: Independência; Referee: Héber Roberto Lopes

17 May 5	Cruzeiro	3−2	Coritiba	Belo Horizonte
18:30 UTC−03:00	Ricardo Goulart 10', 45'; Borges 68'; Dagoberto (yellow card) 74'; Éverton Ribeiro (yellow card) 89'	Report	Alex 22'; Luccas Claro (yellow card) 48'; Norberto 54'	Stadium: Mineirão; Attendance: 11,603; Referee: André Luiz de Freitas Castro

21 May 6	Cruzeiro	2−0	Sport	Belo Horizonte
21:00 UTC−03:00	Ricardo Goulart 50'; Marcelo Moreno 77'	Report		Stadium: Mineirão; Attendance: 13,679; Referee: Felipe Gomes da Silva

25 May 7	Internacional	1−3	Cruzeiro	Caxias do Sul
18:30 UTC−03:00	Wellington 38', (yellow card) 68'	Report	Dagoberto (yellow card) 35'; Ricardo Goulart 42', (yellow card) 89'; Willian 69'; Marcelo Moreno 87'	Stadium: Centenário; Referee: Paulo Henrique de Godoy Bezerra

28 May 8	Corinthians	1−0	Cruzeiro	São Paulo
22:00 UTC−03:00	Guerrero 67'; Petros (yellow card) 74'; Cleber (yellow card) 84'	Report		Stadium: Canindé; Referee: Dewson Freitas

1 June 9	Cruzeiro	3−0	Flamengo	Uberlândia
16:00 UTC−03:00	Ricardo Goulart 16'; Everton Ribeiro 18'; Borges 45'	Report	Luiz Antônio (yellow card) 73'	Stadium: Parque do Sabiá; Referee: Luiz Flávio de Oliveira

17 July 10	Cruzeiro	3–1	Vitória	Belo Horizonte
21:00 UTC−03:00	Alemão 62' (o.g.); Ricardo Goulart 70'; Everton Ribeiro 75'	Report	Richarlyson (yellow card) 48'; Alemão (yellow card) 71'; Adriano (yellow card) 81'; Ayrton 90+1'	Stadium: Mineirão; Attendance: 25,810; Referee: Péricles Bassols

20 July 11	Palmeiras	1–2	Cruzeiro	São Paulo
16:00 UTC−03:00	Tobio 53'; Mendieta (yellow card) 57'; Henrique (yellow card) 76'; Lúcio (yellow card) 90+3'	Report	Ricardo Goulart 7'; Manoel 10'; Lucas Silva (yellow card) 15'; Henrique (yellow card) 52'; Egídio (yellow card) 55'; Fábio (yellow card) 69'; Willian Farias (yellow card) 71'	Stadium: Pacaembu; Attendance: 14,970; Referee: Wilton Sampaio

26 July 12	Cruzeiro	5–0	Figueirense	Belo Horizonte
18:30 UTC−03:00	Lucas Silva 40' (pen.); Marquinhos 46'; Dedé 49'; Ricardo Goulart 72'; Dagoberto 78'	Report	Marco Antônio (yellow card) 33'; Rivaldo (yellow card) 49'	Stadium: Mineirão; Attendance: 21,190; Referee: Gilberto Rodrigues Castro Junior

2 August 13	Botafogo	1–1	Cruzeiro	Rio de Janeiro
18:30 UTC−03:00	Edílson (yellow card) 14', (goal) 25'; Emerson (yellow card) 48'	Report	Henrique (yellow card) 39'; Léo 59'	Stadium: Maracanã; Attendance: 11,975; Referee: Luiz Flávio de Oliveira

9 August 14	Criciúma	0–0	Cruzeiro	Criciúma
18:30 UTC−03:00	Martinez (yellow card) 32'; Serginho (yellow card) 62'; Lucca (yellow card) 77'	Report	Léo (yellow card) 26'	Stadium: Heriberto Hülse; Attendance: 9,521; Referee: Jaílson Macedo Freitas

17 August 15	Cruzeiro	3–0	Santos	Belo Horizonte
16:00 UTC−03:00	Everton Ribeiro (yellow card) 20'; Marcelo Moreno 24'; Mayke (yellow card) 46'; Ricardo Goulart 47'; Júlio Baptista 87', (yellow card) 88'	Report	Alan Santos (yellow card) 53'	Stadium: Mineirão; Attendance: 39,215; Referee: Leandro Pedro Vuaden

21 August 16	Cruzeiro	1–0	Grêmio	Belo Horizonte
20:30 UTC−03:00	Lucas Silva (yellow card) 48'; Henrique (yellow card) 55'; Nílton (yellow card) 73'; Dagoberto 85'; Alisson (yellow card) 87'; Dedé (yellow card) 90+1'	Report	Edinho (yellow card) 47'; Dudu (yellow card) 64'; Zé Roberto (yellow card) 74'	Stadium: Mineirão; Attendance: 32,294; Referee: Flávio Rodrigues Guerra

24 August 17	Goiás	0–1	Cruzeiro	Goiânia
18:30 UTC−03:00	Thiago Mendes (yellow card) 54'; Bruno Mineiro (yellow card) 68'; Jackson (yellow card) 76'; Léo Veloso (yellow card) 86'; David (penalty missed)	Report	Marcelo Moreno 24'; Ceará (yellow card) 81'; Samudio (yellow card) 90+1'; Dedé (yellow card) 90+2'	Stadium: Serra Dourada; Attendance: 5,163; Referee: Francisco Carlos do Nascimento

31 August 18	Cruzeiro	4–2	Chapecoense	Belo Horizonte
16:00 UTC−03:00	Léo 49'; Marcelo Moreno 51', 70'; Ricardo Goulart (yellow card) 53'; Alisson 57'; Henrique (yellow card) 66'; Everton Ribeiro (yellow card) 69'; Lucas Silva (yellow card) 78'	Report	Zezinho 10', (yellow card) 88'; Ednei (yellow card) 22'; Abuda (yellow card) 37'; Bruno Rangel 69'	Stadium: Mineirão; Attendance: 26,682; Referee: Dewson Freitas

7 September 19	Fluminense	3–3	Cruzeiro	Rio de Janeiro
16:00 UTC−03:00	Cícero (yellow card) 13', (goal) 22'; Wágner 17'; Kenedy 88'	Report	Júlio Baptista 14' (pen.), 44'; Ceará (yellow card) 26'; Marcelo Moreno 58'; Dedé (yellow card) 66'; Willian (yellow card) 68'; Marquinhos (yellow card) 90'	Stadium: Maracanã; Referee: Anderson Daronco

11 September 20	Cruzeiro	2–1	Bahia	Belo Horizonte
20:30 UTC−03:00	Henrique (yellow card) 14'; Everton Ribeiro 53' (pen.); Ricardo Goulart 70'	Report	Léo Gago (yellow card) 19'; Guilherme Santos (yellow card) 19'; Rafael Miranda 29'; Fahel (yellow card) 40', (red card) 90+4'; Titi (yellow card) 50' (yellow-red card) 50'	Stadium: Mineirão; Attendance: 20,861; Referee: Marcos Mateus Pereira

14 September 21	São Paulo	2–0	Cruzeiro	São Paulo
UTC−03:00	Kaká (yellow card) 33'; Rogério Ceni 35' (pen.); Alan Kardec (yellow card) 61', (goal) 70'; Álvaro Pereira (yellow card) 64'	Report	Dedé (yellow card) 7'; Ricardo Goulart (yellow card) 32'	Stadium: Morumbi; Attendance: Leandro Pedro Vuaden

17 September 22	Cruzeiro	2–0	Atlético Paranaense	Belo Horizonte
19:30 UTC−03:00	Alisson 26', (yellow card) 27'; Marcelo Moreno 55'	Report		Stadium: Mineirão; Referee: Marcelo Aparecido Ribeiro de Souza

21 September 23	Cruzeiro	2–3	Atlético Mineiro	Belo Horizonte
16:00 UTC−03:00	Ricardo Goulart 45+1'; Alisson 51'	Report	Carlos 38', 90', (yellow card) 90+1'; Diego Tardelli 40', (yellow card) 83'; Leandro Donizete (yellow card) 83'	Stadium: Mineirão; Attendance: 51,069; Referee: Marcelo de Lima Henrique

24 September 24	Coritiba	1–2	Cruzeiro	Curitiba
19:30 UTC−03:00	Germano (yellow card) 6'; Martinuccio 61'; Alex (yellow card) 85'; Carlinhos (yellow card) 90+4'; Zé Eduardo (yellow card) 90+5'	Report	Marcelo Moreno 7' (pen.); Willian (yellow card) 37'; Everton Ribeiro 38'; Dedé (yellow card) 76'	Stadium: Couto Pereira; Attendance: 9,521; Referee: Vinicius Furlan

28 September 25	Sport	0–0	Cruzeiro	Recife
18:30 UTC−03:00	Wendel (yellow card) 10'; Augusto César (yellow card) 90'	Report	Mayke (yellow card) 89'	Stadium: Ilha do Retiro; Referee: Marielson Alves da Silva

4 October 26	Cruzeiro	2–1	Internacional	Belo Horizonte
18:30 UTC−03:00	Marcelo Moreno 19'; Marquinhos 33'; Dedé (yellow card) 39'; Willian (penalty missed); Henrique (yellow card) 65'	Report	Willians (yellow card) 33'; Rafael Moura (yellow card) 46'; Juan (yellow card) 50'; Alex 55'; D'Alessandro (yellow card) 83'	Stadium: Mineirão; Attendance: 51,994; Referee: Marcelo de Lima Henrique

8 October 27	Cruzeiro	0–1	Corinthians	Belo Horizonte
22:00 UTC−03:00	Henrique (yellow card) 29'	Report	Anderson Martins (yellow card) 37'; Luciano 73'; Cássio (yellow card) 89'	Stadium: Mineirão; Attendance: 32,958; Referee: Leandro Pedro Vuaden

12 October 28	Flamengo	3–0	Cruzeiro	Rio de Janeiro
16:00 UTC−03:00	Dedé 13' (o.g.); Cáceres (yellow card) 34'; Marcelo (yellow card) 45'; Canteros 56'; Gabriel 62'	Report	Marquinhos (yellow card) 34'; Nílton (yellow card) 37'	Stadium: Maracanã; Attendance: 36,645; Referee: Francisco Carlos do Nascimento

19 October 29	Vitória	0–1	Cruzeiro	Salvador
18:30 UTC−02:00	Luiz Gustavo (yellow card) 29'; Marcinho (yellow card) 68'; Nino Paraíba (yellow card) 89'	Report	Lucas Silva (yellow card) 65'; Manoel (yellow card) 75'; Dedé 83'	Stadium: Barradão; Attendance: 18,366; Referee: Raphael Claus

22 October 30	Cruzeiro	1–1	Palmeiras	Belo Horizonte
19:30 UTC−02:00	Egídio (yellow card) 59'; Dagoberto 90+2'	Report	Bernardo (yellow card) 22'; João Pedro (yellow card) 56'; Juninho (yellow card) 59'; Mouche 88', (yellow card) 89'	Stadium: Mineirão; Attendance: 26,944; Referee: Péricles Bassols

26 October 31	Figueirense	1–1	Cruzeiro	Florianópolis
16:20 UTC−02:00	Thiago Heleno (yellow card) 84'; Pablo 90+1'	Report	Marquinhos 35'; Lucas Silva (yellow card) 85'	Stadium: Orlando Scarpelli; Attendance: 7,843; Referee: Pablo dos Santos Alves

2 November 32	Cruzeiro	2–1	Botafogo	Belo Horizonte
17:00 UTC−02:00	Marquinhos 5', (yellow card) 44'; Egídio 15'; Lucas Silva (yellow card) 20'	Report	Rodrigo Souto (yellow card) 14'; Júnior César (yellow card) 31'; Andreazzi (yellow card) 60'; Léo 90+1' (o.g.)	Stadium: Mineirão; Attendance: 36,004; Referee: Elmo Alves Resende Cunha

9 November 33	Cruzeiro	3–1	Criciúma	Belo Horizonte
19:30 UTC−02:00				Stadium: Mineirão

16 November 34	Santos	0–1	Cruzeiro	São Paulo
UTC−02:00				Stadium: Pacaembu

19 November 35	Grêmio	1–2	Cruzeiro	Porto Alegre
UTC−02:00				Stadium: Arena do Grêmio

23 November 36	Cruzeiro	2–1	Goiás	Belo Horizonte
UTC−02:00				Stadium: Mineirão

30 November 37	Chapecoense	1–1	Cruzeiro	Chapecó
UTC−02:00				Stadium: Arena Condá

7 December 38	Cruzeiro	2–1	Fluminense	Belo Horizonte
UTC−02:00				Stadium: Mineirão

=== Copa do Brasil ===
==== Round of 16 ====
27 August First leg	Cruzeiro	5–0	Santa Rita	Belo Horizonte
19:30 UTC−03:00	Marcelo Moreno 7', 54'; Dedé 17'; Júlio Baptista 34'; Henrique 86'	Report	Rafael Silva (yellow card) 89'	Stadium: Mineirão; Attendance: 15,048; Referee: Ranilton Oliveira de Souza

3 September Second leg	Santa Rita	1–2 (1–7 agg.)	Cruzeiro	Arapiraca
19:30 UTC−03:00	Adriano (yellow card) 6'; Edson Magal (yellow card) 41'; Cristiano Fontes 44'; Selmo Lima (yellow card) 75'	Report	Júlio Baptista 70' (pen.); Marcelo Moreno 72'	Stadium: Estádio Coaracy Fonseca; Referee: Renan Roberto de Souza

==== Quarterfinals ====
1 October First leg	Cruzeiro	1–0	ABC	Belo Horizonte
19:30 UTC−03:00	Dagoberto (yellow card) 75'; Léo 78'	Report	João Paulo (yellow card) 61'; Camilo (yellow card) 67'; Suéliton (yellow card) 68'; Xuxa (yellow card) 87'	Stadium: Mineirão; Attendance: 12,522; Referee: Pablo dos Santos Alves

15 October Second leg	ABC	3–2 (3–3a agg.)	Cruzeiro	Natal
22:00 UTC−03:00	Xuxa (yellow card) 52', (goal) 65' (pen.); Rodrigo Silva 59'; Alvinho 85'	Report	Willian 30'; Henrique 41'; Alisson (yellow card) 56'; Dedé (yellow card) 64'; Nílton (yellow card) 75'; Fábio (yellow card) 90+3'	Stadium: Arena das Dunas; Referee: Anderson Daronco
Note: Cruzeiro won on away goals.

==== Semifinals ====
29 October First leg	Cruzeiro	1–0	Santos	Belo Horizonte
22:00 UTC−02:00	Willian 10'	Report	Mena (yellow card) 56'; Edu Dracena (yellow card) 84'	Stadium: Mineirão; Attendance: 25,742; Referee: Marcelo de Lima Henrique

5 November Second leg	Santos	3–3 (3–4 agg.)	Cruzeiro	Santos
22:00 UTC−02:00				Stadium: Vila Belmiro

==== Final ====
12 November First leg	Atlético Mineiro	2–0	Cruzeiro	Belo Horizonte
22:00 UTC−02:00				Stadium: Estádio Independência

26 November Second leg	Cruzeiro	0–1 (0–3 agg.)	Atlético Mineiro	Belo Horizonte
22:00 UTC−02:00				Stadium: Mineirão
