= 2016 Cruzeiro EC season =

Cruzeiro
2016 season
- President: Gilvan Tavares
- Manager: Deivid (until 24 April); Paulo Bento (11 May to 25 July); Mano Menezes (from 26 July)
- Stadium: Mineirão
- Série A: 12th
- Campeonato Mineiro: Semi-finals
- Copa do Brasil: Semi-finals
- Primeira Liga: Group stage
- Top goalscorer: League: De Arrascaeta (9); All: De Arrascaeta (14)
- Highest home attendance: 53,452 vs Grêmio (26 October, Copa do Brasil)
- Lowest home attendance: 4,476 vs Athletico Paranaense (9 March, Primeira Liga)
- Average home league attendance: 21,082
- Biggest win: 4–0 vs Ponte Preta (22 June, Série A)
- Biggest defeat: 1–4 vs Santa Cruz (25 May, Série A)
Home colours	Away colours	Third colours

The 2016 season was the 95th in the Cruzeiro Esporte Clube's existence. Along with the Campeonato Brasileiro Série A, the club also competed in the Campeonato Mineiro, the Primeira Liga and the Copa do Brasil.

== Competitions ==
=== Overview ===
Competition	First match	Last match	Starting round	Final position	Record							
Competition	First match	Last match	Starting round	Final position	Pld	W	D	L	GF	GA	GD	Win %
Campeonato Brasileiro Série A	14 May 2016	11 December 2016	Matchday 1	12th	38	14	9	15	48	49	−1	36.84
Copa do Brasil	27 August 2016	26 November 2016	First round	Semi-finals	11	7	2	2	20	12	+8	63.64
Campeonato Mineiro	31 January 2016	24 April 2016	Matchday 1	Semi-finals	13	9	3	1	18	8	+10	69.23
Primeira Liga	27 January 2016	9 March 2016	Group stage	Group stage	3	1	1	1	6	6	+0	33.33
Total					65	31	15	19	92	75	+17	47.69

Source: Competitions

=== Campeonato Mineiro ===
==== First stage ====
Pos	Team	Pld	W	D	L	GF	GA	GD	Pts	Qualification or relegation
1	Cruzeiro	11	9	2	0	18	6	+12	29	Knockout stage
2	Atlético Mineiro	11	6	2	3	25	11	+14	20	Knockout stage
3	URT	11	5	4	2	10	8	+2	19	Knockout stage
4	América Mineiro	11	5	3	3	14	11	+3	18	Knockout stage
5	Caldense	11	4	2	5	12	12	0	14	

Updated to match(es) played on 10 April 2016. Source: FMF
Rules for classification: 1) points; 2) wins; 3) goal difference; 4) goals scored; 5) head-to-head results; 6) least red cards received; 7) least yellow cards received; 8) draw.

31 January 1	Cruzeiro	0–0	URT	Belo Horizonte
17:00 UTC−3		Report		Stadium: Mineirão; Attendance: 15,397; Referee: Gabriel Murta Maciel

3 February 2	Tombense	1–2	Cruzeiro	Tombos
19:30 UTC−3	Paulo Otávio 19'	Report	Alisson 51'; Rafael Silva 87'	Stadium: Almeidão; Attendance: 3,563; Referee: Emerson de Almeida Ferreira

14 February 3	Cruzeiro	1–0	Tupi	Belo Horizonte
17:00 UTC−3	Élber 73'	Report		Stadium: Mineirão; Attendance: 9,102; Referee: Wanderson Alves de Souza

20 February 4	Tricordiano	0–1	Cruzeiro	Sete Lagoas
19:30 UTC−3		Report	De Arrascaeta 57'	Stadium: Arena do Jacaré; Attendance: 3,464; Referee: Marco Aurélio Ferreira

28 February 5	Cruzeiro	1–1	América Mineiro	Belo Horizonte
17:00 UTC−3	De Arrascaeta 44'	Report	Bryan 90+1'	Stadium: Mineirão; Attendance: 19,622; Referee: Emerson de Almeida Ferreira

6 March 6	Caldense	0–1	Cruzeiro	Poços de Caldas
16:30 UTC−3		Report	Alisson 12'	Stadium: Ronaldão; Attendance: 2,626; Referee: Cleisson Veloso Pereira

15 March 7	Cruzeiro	3–0	Uberlândia	Belo Horizonte
20:30 UTC−3	Bruno Rodrigo 34'; Lucas Romero 57'; Ariel Cabral 78'	Report		Stadium: Mineirão; Attendance: 7,688; Referee: Igor Júnio Benevenuto

20 March 8	Cruzeiro	3–2	Villa Nova	Belo Horizonte
16:00 UTC−3	Gabriel Santos 68' (o.g.); Rafael Silva 75'; Bruno Rodrigo 90'	Report	Fábio Júnior 46'; Mancini 73'	Stadium: Mineirão; Attendance: 11,477; Referee: Wanderson Alves de Souza

27 March 9	Atlético Mineiro	0–1	Cruzeiro	Belo Horizonte
11:00 UTC−3		Report	Rafael Silva 73'	Stadium: Independência; Attendance: 15,842; Referee: Emerson de Almeida Ferreira

3 April 10	Cruzeiro	2–0	Guarani	Belo Horizonte
16:00 UTC−3	Alisson 18'; Sánchez Miño 34'	Report		Stadium: Mineirão; Attendance: 9,285; Referee: Felipe Fernandes de Lima

10 April 11	Boa Esporte	2–3	Cruzeiro	Varginha
16:00 UTC−3	Leonardo 31'; Rodrigo Mucuri 89'	Report	Douglas Coutinho 18', 26'; Allano 79'	Stadium: Melão; Attendance: 4,802; Referee: Ronei Cândido Alves

==== Knockout phase ====
===== Semi-finals =====
16 April First leg	América Mineiro	2–0	Cruzeiro	Belo Horizonte
16:20 UTC−3	Adalberto 42'; Victor Rangel 75'	Report		Stadium: Estádio Independência; Attendance: 3,818; Referee: Igor Júnio Benevenuto

24 April Second leg	Cruzeiro	0–0 (0–2 agg.)	América Mineiro	Belo Horizonte
16:00 UTC−3		Report		Stadium: Mineirão; Attendance: 35,214; Referee: Igor Júnio Benevenuto

=== Campeonato Brasileiro Série A ===
==== League table ====
Pos	Team	Pld	W	D	L	GF	GA	GD	Pts	Qualification or relegation
10	São Paulo	38	14	10	14	44	36	+8	52	Qualification for 2017 Copa Sudamericana
11	Chapecoense	38	13	13	12	49	56	−7	52 (Note: The matchday 38 game between Chapecoense and Atlético Mineiro was cancelled after both teams declined to play following the Chapecoense team plane crash. Both teams received a double walkover (3–0 loss for each team).)	Qualification for 2017 Copa Libertadores group stage
12	Cruzeiro	38	14	9	15	48	49	−1	51	Qualification for 2017 Copa Sudamericana
13	Fluminense	38	13	11	14	45	45	0	50	Qualification for 2017 Copa Sudamericana
14	Sport	38	13	8	17	49	55	−6	47	Qualification for 2017 Copa Sudamericana

Source: CBF
Rules for classification: 1) points; 2) wins; 3) goal difference; 4) goals scored; 5) head-to-head results; 6) least red cards received; 7) least yellow cards received; 8) draw.

==== Results by round ====
Round	1	2	3	4	5	6	7	8	9	10	11	12	13	14	15	16	17	18	19	20	21	22	23	24	25	26	27	28	29	30	31	32	33	34	35	36	37	38
Ground	A	H	A	H	A	H	A	H	A	A	H	A	H	H	A	H	A	H	A	H	A	H	A	H	A	H	A	H	H	A	H	A	A	H	A	H	A	H
Result	L	D	L	D	W	L	W	L	L	W	W	L	D	L	L	L	L	W	D	D	W	W	W	L	L	D	L	W	W	D	D	W	L	W	W	D	L	W
Position	16	16	19	19	14	18	15	17	20	16	13	14	14	16	19	19	19	19	18	18	17	16	13	13	16	15	17	16	14	13	13	13	13	13	11	12	13	12

Updated to match(es) played on 11 December 2016. Source: Matches
A = Away; H = Home; W = Win; D = Draw; L = Loss

==== Matches ====
14 May 1	Coritiba	1–0	Cruzeiro	Curitiba
21:00 UTC−3	Kléber 70'	Report		Stadium: Couto Pereira; Attendance: 6,028; Referee: Jean Pierre Gonçalves Lima

21 May 2	Cruzeiro	2–2	Figueirense	Belo Horizonte
21:00 UTC−3	Élber 56'; Douglas Coutinho 62'	Report	Rafael Moura 41', 55'	Stadium: Mineirão; Attendance: 12,647; Referee: Wagner Reway

25 May 3	Santa Cruz	4–1	Cruzeiro	Recife
21:45 UTC−3	Grafite 19' (pen.), 65'; Arthur Caíke 76'; Keno 89'	Report	De Arrascaeta 52'	Stadium: Arruda; Attendance: 16,331; Referee: Anderson Daronco

28 May 4	Cruzeiro	1–1	América Mineiro	Belo Horizonte
16:00 UTC−3	De Arrascaeta 81'	Report	Victor Rangel 29'	Stadium: Mineirão; Attendance: 11,266; Referee: Dewson Freitas da Silva

1 June 5	Botafogo	0–1	Cruzeiro	Brasília
21:45 UTC−3		Report	Élber 27'	Stadium: Mané Garrincha; Attendance: 7,057; Referee: Elmo Alves Resende Cunha

5 June 6	Cruzeiro	0–1	São Paulo	Belo Horizonte
18:30 UTC−3		Report	Ytalo 22'	Stadium: Mineirão; Attendance: 18,880; Referee: André Luiz de Freitas Castro

12 June 7	Atlético Mineiro	2–3	Cruzeiro	Belo Horizonte
16:00 UTC−3	Rafael Carioca 13'; Fred 56'	Report	Alisson 19'; Riascos 48'; Bruno Rodrigo 63'	Stadium: Independência; Attendance: 19,484; Referee: Marcelo Aparecido de Souza

15 June 8	Cruzeiro	0–1	Flamengo	Belo Horizonte
21:45 UTC−3		Report	Réver 42'	Stadium: Mineirão; Attendance: 17,593; Referee: Raphael Claus

19 June 9	Grêmio	2–0	Cruzeiro	Porto Alegre
19:00 UTC−3	Luan 44'; Douglas 51'	Report		Stadium: Arena do Grêmio; Attendance: 14,658; Referee: Thiago Duarte Peixoto

22 June 10	Ponte Preta	0–4	Cruzeiro	Campinas
19:30 UTC−3		Report	Henrique 7'; De Arrascaeta 20', 54' (pen.); Alisson 77'	Stadium: Moisés Lucarelli; Attendance: 4,183; Referee: Dewson Freitas da Silva

25 June 11	Cruzeiro	2–1	Palmeiras	Belo Horizonte
19:00 UTC−3	Willian 14', 47'	Report	Gabriel Jesus 10'	Stadium: Mineirão; Attendance: 18,082; Referee: Leandro Pedro Vuaden

29 June 12	Chapecoense	3–2	Cruzeiro	Chapecó
21:00 UTC−3	Silvinho 41'; Arthur Maia 68'; Kempes 89'	Report	Pisano 6'; Fabrício Bruno 83'	Stadium: Arena Condá; Attendance: 6,774; Referee: Rodolpho Toski Marques

3 July 13	Cruzeiro	2–2	Vitória	Belo Horizonte
11:00 UTC−3	Alisson 23'; De Arrascaeta 53'	Report	Diego Renan 64' (pen.); Vander 85'	Stadium: Mineirão; Attendance: 43,821; Referee: Pericles Bassols

11 July 14	Cruzeiro	0–3	Athletico Paranaense	Belo Horizonte
20:00 UTC−3		Report	Pablo 65'; André Lima 67', 82'	Stadium: Mineirão; Attendance: 32,042; Referee: Anderson Daronco

17 July 15	Fluminense	2–0	Cruzeiro	Mesquita
16:00 UTC−3	Cícero 7'; Marcos Júnior 25' (pen.)	Report		Stadium: Giulite Coutinho; Attendance: 9,681; Referee: Wilton Pereira Sampaio

24 July 16	Cruzeiro	1–2	Sport	Belo Horizonte
16:00 UTC−3	Willian 90+2'	Report	Rogério 38', 51'	Stadium: Mineirão; Attendance: 18,861; Referee: Leandro Pedro Vuaden

31 July 17	Santos	2–0	Cruzeiro	Santos
16:00 UTC−3	Vitor Bueno 61'; Lucas 74' (o.g.)	Report		Stadium: Vila Belmiro; Attendance: 13,830; Referee: Wagner Reway

4 August 18	Cruzeiro	4–2	Internacional	Belo Horizonte
21:00 UTC−3	Rafael Sóbis 13', 41', 52'; Ábila 16'	Report	Seijas 2'; Alex 73' (pen.)	Stadium: Independência; Attendance: 12,454; Referee: Raphael Claus

8 August 19	Corinthians	1–1	Cruzeiro	São Paulo
21:00 UTC−3	Giovanni Augusto 2'	Report	Ábila 65'	Stadium: Pacaembu; Attendance: 34,487; Referee: Dewson Freitas da Silva

14 August 20	Cruzeiro	2–2	Coritiba	Belo Horizonte
16:00 UTC−3	Rafinha 2'; Ábila 49'	Report	Kazim-Richards 19'; Juan 27'	Stadium: Independência; Attendance: 13,814; Referee: Jailson Macedo Freitas

21 August 21	Figueirense	1–2	Cruzeiro	Florianópolis
18:30 UTC−3	Ferrugem 88'	Report	Henrique 3'; Ábila 47'	Stadium: Orlando Scarpelli; Attendance: 2,578; Referee: João Batista de Arruda

28 August 22	Cruzeiro	2–0	Santa Cruz	Belo Horizonte
11:00 UTC−3	Robinho 49'; Ábila 53'	Report		Stadium: Mineirão; Attendance: 46,591; Referee: Sandro Meira Ricci

8 September 23	América Mineiro	0–2	Cruzeiro	Belo Horizonte
21:00 UTC−3		Report	De Arrascaeta 20'; Ábila 69'	Stadium: Independência; Attendance: 5,651; Referee: Igor Junio Benevenuto

11 September 24	Cruzeiro	0–2	Botafogo	Belo Horizonte
16:00 UTC−3		Report	Canales 66'; Camilo 79'	Stadium: Mineirão; Attendance: 26,611; Referee: Rafael Traci

15 September 25	São Paulo	1–0	Cruzeiro	São Paulo
21:00 UTC−3	Wesley 42'	Report		Stadium: Morumbi; Attendance: 15,566; Referee: Diego Almeida Real

18 September 26	Cruzeiro	1–1	Atlético Mineiro	Belo Horizonte
16:00 UTC−3	Robinho 76'	Report	Clayton 30'	Stadium: Mineirão; Attendance: 43,381; Referee: Bráulio da Silva Machado

25 September 27	Flamengo	2–1	Cruzeiro	Cariacica
16:00 UTC−3	Guerrero 83'; Mancuello 89'	Report	Rafinha 73'	Stadium: Kléber Andrade; Attendance: 15,680; Referee: Leandro Pedro Vuaden

1 October 28	Cruzeiro	1–0	Grêmio	Belo Horizonte
18:30 UTC−3	Henrique 72'	Report		Stadium: Mineirão; Attendance: 14,283; Referee: Elmo Alves Resende Cunha

8 October 29	Cruzeiro	2–0	Ponte Preta	Belo Horizonte
21:00 UTC−3	Ábila 11'; Robinho 81'	Report		Stadium: Mineirão; Attendance: 15,425; Referee: Anderson Daronco

13 October 30	Palmeiras	0–0	Cruzeiro	Araraquara
19:30 UTC−3		Report		Stadium: Fonte Luminosa; Attendance: 15,709; Referee: Jailson Macêdo Freitas

16 October 31	Cruzeiro	0–0	Chapecoense	Belo Horizonte
17:00 UTC−3		Report		Stadium: Mineirão; Attendance: 14,761; Referee: Luiz Flávio de Oliveira

23 October 32	Vitória	0–1	Cruzeiro	Salvador
17:00 UTC−3		Report	Ariel Cabral 40'	Stadium: Barradão; Attendance: 27,489; Referee: Thiago Duarte Peixoto

29 October 33	Athletico Paranaense	1–0	Cruzeiro	Curitiba
16:30 UTC−3	Manoel 13' (o.g.)	Report		Stadium: Arena da Baixada; Attendance: 17,702; Referee: Marcelo Aparecido de Souza

6 November 34	Cruzeiro	4–2	Fluminense	Belo Horizonte
17:00 UTC−3	Rafael Sóbis 25'; Willian 44'; De Arrascaeta 46'; Alisson 50'	Report	Richarlison 8'; Ábila 90+2' (o.g.)	Stadium: Mineirão; Attendance: 10,068; Referee: Elmo Alves Resende Cunha

16 November 35	Sport	0–1	Cruzeiro	Recife
21:45 UTC−3		Report	Henrique 42'	Stadium: Ilha do Retiro; Attendance: 25,477; Referee: Thiago Duarte Peixoto

20 November 36	Cruzeiro	2–2	Santos	Belo Horizonte
17:00 UTC−3	De Arrascaeta 22'; Manoel 88'	Report	Ricardo Oliveira 48', 61' (pen.)	Stadium: Mineirão; Attendance: 13,902; Referee: Héber Roberto Lopes

27 November 37	Internacional	1–0	Cruzeiro	Porto Alegre
17:00 UTC−3	Valdívia 75'	Report		Stadium: Beira-Rio; Attendance: 25,352; Referee: Marcelo Aparecido de Souza

11 December 38	Cruzeiro	3–2	Corinthians	Belo Horizonte
17:00 UTC−3	De Arrascaeta 24'; Ezequiel 56'; Robinho 58'	Report	Guilherme 7'; Marlone 54'	Stadium: Mineirão; Attendance: 16,074; Referee: Wagner Reway

=== Primeira Liga ===
==== Group stage ====
Pos	Team	Pld	W	D	L	GF	GA	GD	Pts	Qualification
1	Fluminense	3	2	0	1	6	4	+2	6	Qualifies to the Final stage
2	Atlético Paranaense	3	2	0	1	3	2	+1	6	Qualifies to the Final stage
3	Cruzeiro	3	1	1	1	6	6	0	4	
4	Criciúma	3	0	1	2	1	4	−3	1	

27 January 1	Criciúma	1–1	Cruzeiro	Criciúma
19:30 UTC−3	Diego Giaretta 23'	Report	Alisson 15'	Stadium: Heriberto Hülse; Attendance: 4,691; Referee: Charles Martins Lemos

17 February 2	Cruzeiro	3–4	Fluminense	Belo Horizonte
19:30 UTC−3	Rafael Silva 5', 43'; De Arrascaeta 65'	Report	Diego Souza 28' (pen.), 34', 70' (pen.); Gustavo Scarpa 37'	Stadium: Mineirão; Attendance: 21,118; Referee: Francisco Neto

9 March 3	Cruzeiro	2–1	Athletico Paranaense	Belo Horizonte
19:30 UTC−3	Douglas Coutinho 75'; Élber 79'	Report	Pablo 33'	Stadium: Mineirão; Attendance: 4,476; Referee: Leandro Pedro Vuaden

=== Copa do Brasil ===
The drawn for the first round was held on 11 January.

==== First round ====
20 April First leg	Campinense	0–0	Cruzeiro	Campina Grande
21:45 UTC−3		Report		Stadium: Amigão; Attendance: 2,214; Referee: Flávio Rodrigues de Souza

5 May Second leg	Cruzeiro	3–2 (3–2 agg.)	Campinense	Belo Horizonte
21:30 UTC−3	Allano 17'; De Arrascaeta 49'; Willian 74'	Report	Adalgisio Pitbull 39', 86'	Stadium: Mineirão; Attendance: 10,200; Referee: Bruno Arleu de Araújo

==== Second round ====
10 May	Londrina	0–2	Cruzeiro	Londrina
21:30 UTC−3		Report	Bruno Rodrigo 22'; Henrique 36'	Stadium: Estádio do Café; Attendance: 2,732; Referee: Márcio Henrique de Gois

==== Third round ====
6 July First leg	Vitória	1–2	Cruzeiro	Salvador
21:45 UTC−3	Diego Renan 14' (pen.)	Report	Willian 7', 71'	Stadium: Barradão; Attendance: 8,661; Referee: Paulo Schleich Vollkopf

20 July Second leg	Cruzeiro	2–1 (4–2 agg.)	Vitória	Belo Horizonte
21:45 UTC−3	Bruno Ramires 22'; Ábila 46'	Report	Marinho 71'	Stadium: Mineirão; Attendance: 10,775; Referee: Thiago Duarte Peixoto

==== Round of 16 ====
1 September First leg	Botafogo	2–5	Cruzeiro	Rio de Janeiro
20:00 UTC−3	Sassá 38'; Neilton 60'	Report	Ábila 45' (pen.), 64'; Robinho 59', 66'; Henrique 90+2'	Stadium: Luso Brasileiro; Attendance: 4,959; Referee: Flávio Rodrigues de Souza

21 September Second leg	Cruzeiro	1–0 (6–2 agg.)	Botafogo	Belo Horizonte
21:45 UTC−3	Bruno Rodrigo 37'	Report		Stadium: Mineirão; Attendance: 8,534; Referee: Marcelo Aparecido de Souza

==== Quarter-finals ====
28 September First leg	Corinthians	2–1	Cruzeiro	São Paulo
21:45 UTC−3	Léo 47' (o.g.); Romero 53'	Report	Robinho 77'	Stadium: Arena Corinthians; Attendance: 18,796; Referee: Eduardo Aquino Valadão

19 October Second leg	Cruzeiro	4–2 (5–4 agg.)	Corinthians	Belo Horizonte
21:45 UTC−3	Ábila 13', 59' (pen.); Bruno Rodrigo 62'; De Arrascaeta 83'	Report	Rodriguinho 35'; Rildo 85'	Stadium: Mineirão; Attendance: 32,738; Referee: Wilton Pereira Sampaio

==== Semi-finals ====
26 October First leg	Cruzeiro	0–2	Grêmio	Belo Horizonte
21:45 UTC−3		Report	Luan 19'; Douglas 61'	Stadium: Mineirão; Attendance: 53,452; Referee: Pericles Bassols

2 November Second leg	Grêmio	0–0 (2–0 agg.)	Cruzeiro	Porto Alegre
21:45 UTC−3		Report		Stadium: Arena do Grêmio; Attendance: 47,687; Referee: Thiago Duarte Peixoto
