= Mayke =

Brazilian footballer (born 1992)

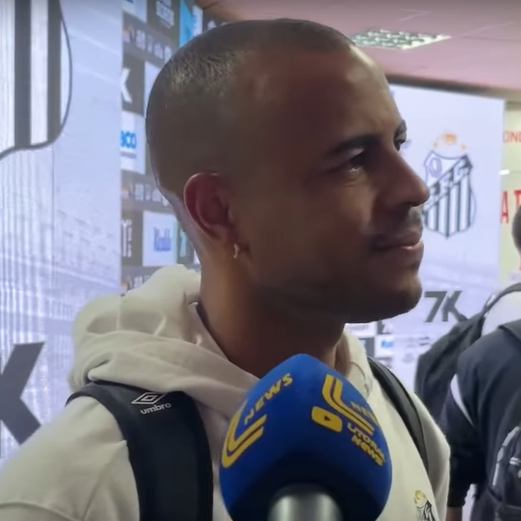
- Mayke in 2025

Personal information
- Full name: Mayke Rocha de Oliveira
- Date of birth: 10 November 1992 (age 34)
- Place of birth: Carangola, Brazil
- Height: 1.79 m (5 ft 10 in)
- Position: Right-back

Youth career
- Siderúrgica
- 2010–2012: Cruzeiro

Senior career*
Years	Team	Apps	(Gls)
2012–2018	Cruzeiro	112	(3)
2017–2018	→ Palmeiras (loan)	47	(1)
2019–2025	Palmeiras	187	(5)
2025–2026	Santos	19	(0)
- * Club domestic league appearances and goals as of 14:59, 18 May 2026 (UTC)

Mayke Rocha de Oliveira (born 10 November 1992), simply known as Mayke, is a Brazilian footballer who plays as a right-back.

== Career ==
=== Cruzeiro ===
Born in Carangola but raised in Pedra Dourada, both in the state of Minas Gerais, Mayke joined the youth categories of Cruzeiro in 2010, after impressing in the year's Taça Belo Horizonte de Juniores for Siderúrgica; at that time, he was deployed as an attacking midfielder. He was promoted to the main squad in September 2012 by head coach Celso Roth, but did not appear in that season.

Mayke made his first team debut on 17 March 2013, coming on as a half-time substitute for Ceará in a 4–1 Campeonato Mineiro away routing of Boa Esporte. He became a backup of Ceará during the year, and scored his first professional goal on 17 August, netting his team's second in a 5–1 home win over Vitória.

On 5 December 2013, after sharing the starting spot with Ceará over the year as the club won the Série A, Mayke renewed his contract until 2016. He became a regular starter in the following campaign as Cruzeiro won their second consecutive league title, but lost his starting spot in 2015 to new signing Fabiano after poor performances.

Mayke struggled severely with injuries in 2016, but was unable to establish himself as a first-choice after another set of poor performances.

=== Palmeiras ===
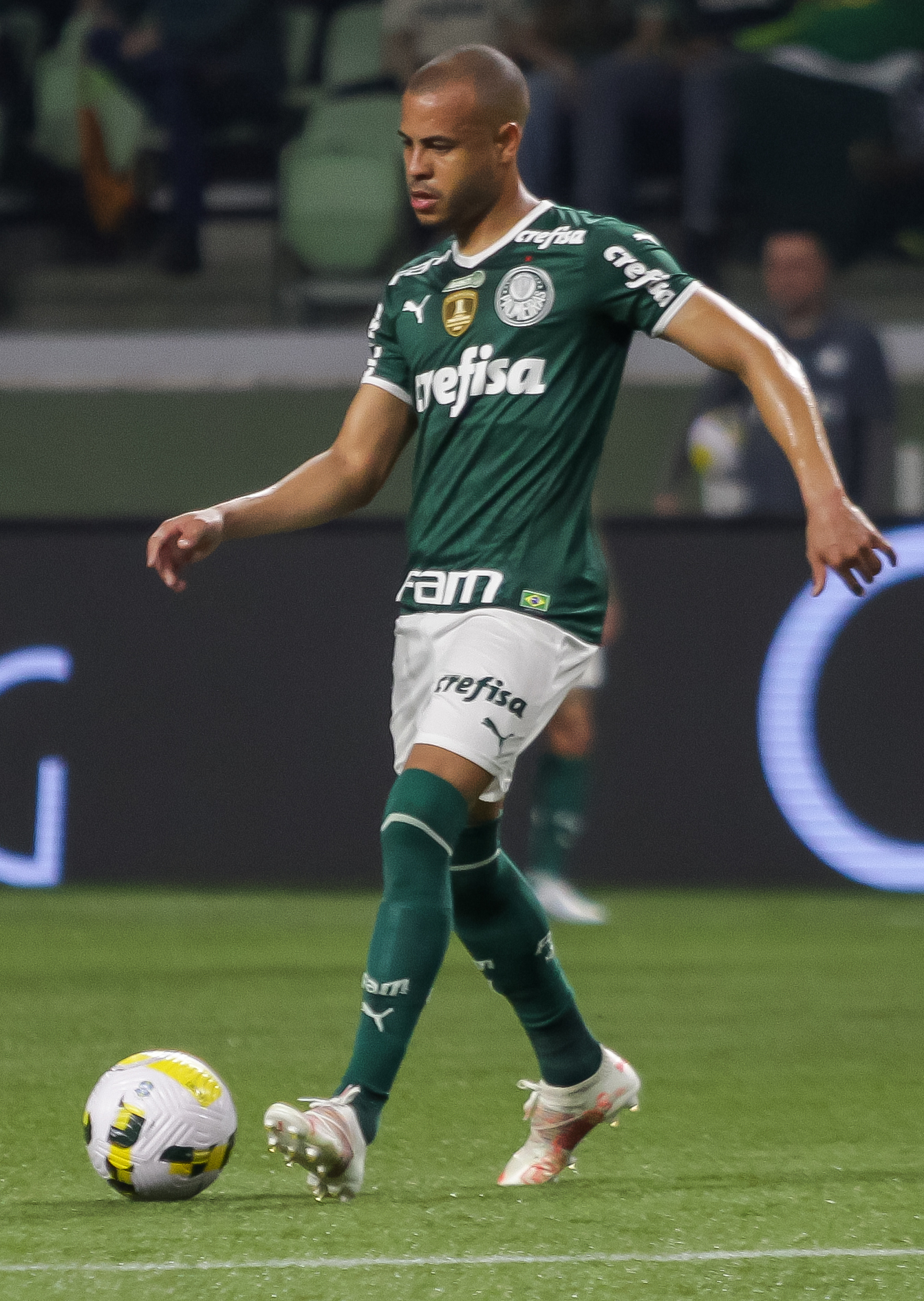
Mayke playing for Palmeiras in 2022

On 13 May 2017, after renewing his contract with Cruzeiro until 2020, Mayke was loaned to Palmeiras until the end of 2018, with Rafael Marques moving in the opposite direction permanently. A starter in his first year, he became a backup option after the arrival of Marcos Rocha, but was still bought by the club on 28 November 2018, signing a permanent five-year deal.

Mayke remained a backup to Rocha in the following seasons, but was a starter in the 2021 Copa Libertadores final as Rocha was suspended. On 13 October 2022, he further extended his link with Verdão until December 2024. In the 2023 season, he finally enjoyed a run as a first-choice, overtaking Rocha, but would lose his first-choice status in the following year.

In January 2024, Mayke renewed his contract with Palmeiras until 2025.

=== Santos ===
On 30 July 2025, Santos announced the signing of Mayke on a contract until December 2027. He made his debut for the club on 4 August, replacing Benjamín Rollheiser at half-time in a 3–1 home win over Juventude.

Signed as a first-choice, Mayke quickly lost his starting spot to Igor Vinícius, and was criticized due to his performances before being deemed surplus to requirements in June 2026. On 7 August, he terminated his link with the club.

== Career statistics ==
As of 18 May 2026

Appearances and goals by club, season and competition
Club	Season	League			State league (Note: Includes Campeonato Mineiro, Campeonato Paulista)		Copa do Brasil		Continental		Other		Total	
Club	Season	Division	Apps	Goals	Apps	Goals	Apps	Goals	Apps	Goals	Apps	Goals	Apps	Goals
Cruzeiro	2012	Série A	0	0	0	0	0	0	—		—		0	0
Cruzeiro	2013	Série A	22	2	5	0	2	0	—		—		29	2
Cruzeiro	2014	Série A	30	0	9	1	4	0	2 (Note: Appearance(s) in Copa Libertadores)	0	—		45	1
Cruzeiro	2015	Série A	17	0	9	0	1	0	9	0	—		36	0
Cruzeiro	2016	Série A	4	0	7	0	1	0	—		1 (Note: Appearance(s) in Primeira Liga)	0	13	0
Cruzeiro	2017	Série A	0	0	9	0	2	0	2 (Note: Appearance(s) in Copa Sudamericana)	0	2	0	15	0
Cruzeiro	Total		73	2	39	1	10	0	13	0	3	0	138	3
Palmeiras (loan)	2017	Série A	26	1	—		—		0	0	—		26	1
Palmeiras (loan)	2018	Série A	20	0	1	0	2	0	9	0	—		32	0
Palmeiras	2019	Série A	6	0	10	0	2	1	3	0	—		21	1
Palmeiras	2020	Série A	21	0	4	0	5	0	4	0	2 (Note: Appearance(s) in FIFA Club World Cup)	0	36	0
Palmeiras	2021	Série A	12	0	11	0	2	0	6 (Note: Four appearances in Copa Libertadores, Two appearances in Recopa Sudamericana)	0	1 (Note: Appearance(s) in Supercopa do Brasil)	0	32	0
Palmeiras	2022	Série A	28	3	8	0	2	0	10 (Note: Nine appearances in Copa Libertadores, One appearance in Recopa Sudamericana)	0	—		48	3
Palmeiras	2023	Série A	33	1	8	0	5	0	11	1	1	0	58	2
Palmeiras	2024	Série A	22	1	8	0	4	0	5	0	1	0	40	1
Palmeiras	2025	Série A	3	0	13	0	1	0	3	0	1 (Note: Appearance(s) in FIFA Club World Cup)	0	21	0
Palmeiras	Total		171	6	63	0	23	1	51	1	6	0	314	8
Santos	2025	Série A	12	0	—		—		—		—		12	0
Santos	2026	Série A	3	0	4	0	0	0	1	0	—		8	0
Santos	Total		15	0	4	0	0	0	1	0	—		20	0
Career total			259	8	106	1	33	1	65	1	9	0	472	11

== Honours ==
=== Club ===
Cruzeiro

- Campeonato Brasileiro Série A: 2013, 2014
- Campeonato Mineiro: 2014

Palmeiras

- Campeonato Brasileiro Série A: 2018, 2022, 2023
- Campeonato Paulista: 2020, 2022, 2023, 2024
- Copa Libertadores: 2020, 2021
- Copa do Brasil: 2020
- Recopa Sudamericana: 2022
- Supercopa do Brasil: 2023
- FIFA Club World Cup Runner Up: 2021

=== Individual ===
- Bola de Prata: 2013, 2018, 2023
- Campeonato Brasileiro Série A Team of the Year: 2018
