= Breno Lopes =

Breno Lopes may refer to:

- Breno Lopes (footballer, born 1990), Brazilian football leftback
- Breno Lopes (footballer, born 1996), Brazilian football forward
