= Lucas Silva (footballer, born 1993) =

Brazilian footballer

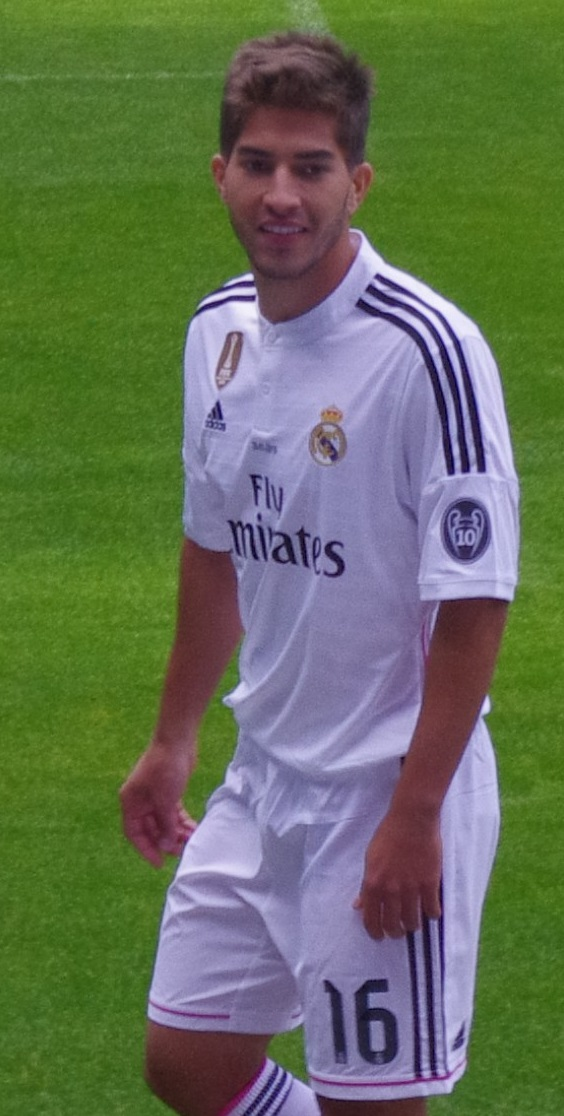
- Silva during his presentation at Real Madrid in 2015

Personal information
- Full name: Lucas Silva Borges
- Date of birth: 16 February 1993 (age 33)
- Place of birth: Bom Jesus de Goiás, Brazil
- Height: 1.82 m (6 ft 0 in)
- Position: Midfielder

Team information
- Current team: Cruzeiro
- Number: 16

Youth career
- 2005–2007: AE Ovel
- 2007–2012: Cruzeiro

Senior career*
Years	Team	Apps	(Gls)
2012–2015	Cruzeiro	69	(3)
2012	→ Nacional-MG (loan)	1	(0)
2015–2019	Real Madrid	8	(0)
2015–2016	→ Marseille (loan)	22	(0)
2017–2019	→ Cruzeiro (loan)	65	(0)
2020–2023	Grêmio	83	(3)
2023–	Cruzeiro	116	(4)

International career
2012	Brazil U20	3	(1)
2014	Brazil U23	7	(1)
- * Club domestic league appearances and goals as of 9 April 2026

Lucas Silva Borges (Brazilian Portuguese: [ˈlukɐs ˈsiwvɐ]; born 16 February 1993) is a Brazilian professional footballer who plays as a central midfielder for Cruzeiro.

== Club career ==
=== Cruzeiro ===
Born in Bom Jesus de Goiás, Goiás, Silva joined Cruzeiro's youth setup in 2007, aged 14, after starting out at lowly locals AE Ovel. He was nearly released by the club in his first year as a youth, but later stood out and progressed through the youth levels.

In 2012 Silva was loaned to Nacional de Nova Serrana until the end of the year's Campeonato Mineiro. He made his senior debut on 10 March, starting in a 2–4 away loss against Atlético Mineiro. It was the only appearance Silva made for the club before returning to Cruzeiro.

On 26 April 2012, after returning from loan, Silva was promoted to the main squad by manager Vágner Mancini. He made his first team – and Série A – debut on 18 July, coming on as a second half substitute for Tinga in a 2–0 away win against Portuguesa. He was predominantly used as backup throughout the season and appeared in only eight matches during what was his first professional year at Raposa.

The arrival of new manager Marcelo Oliveira in 2013 saw an increase in game time at Cruzeiro for Silva. He scored his first professional goals on 1 September, netting a brace in a 5–3 home win against Vasco da Gama, and appeared in 23 matches during the campaign as his side were crowned champions. The following season Silva was an ever-present figure in Cruzeiro's midfield as the club were again crowned Série A champions. At the conclusion of the season, Silva was elected the tournament's best defensive midfielder.

=== Real Madrid ===
On 22 January 2015, Spanish La Liga side Real Madrid agreed an undisclosed fee for Silva, rumoured to be €14 million (£9.7 million). He was officially announced by the club in the following day, and signed a 5 1/2-year contract. Silva made his debut for the Merengues on 14 February 2015, coming on as a second-half substitute for Asier Illarramendi in a 2–0 home win against Deportivo de La Coruña.

On 3 September 2019, Real Madrid and Silva terminated the contract by mutual consent.

==== Loan to Marseille ====
On 26 August 2015, it was announced that Marseille had signed Silva on loan for the 2015–16 season. He made his debut on 13 September, playing the full 90 minutes as Marseille beat Bastia 4–1 in Ligue 1. During the January transfer market, Silva was asked by chairman Vincent Labrune to terminate his loan at Marseille and join Anderlecht instead. He refused the request and was subsequently dropped and excluded from the UEFA Europa League squad for the remainder of the season.

==== Return to Cruzeiro (loan) ====
Lucas Silva returned to Cruzeiro on 31 January 2017, signing a loan deal until 30 June 2018. On 3 July 2018, it was announced that he would return on loan for one more season.

=== Grêmio ===
Four months after leaving Real Madrid for free, Lucas Silva signed a contract with Brazilian club Grêmio on 2 January 2020, with an expiry date of December 2023. After the contract's expiration, he left the club.

=== Return to Cruzeiro (third spell) ===
On 17 July 2023, on a free transfer, he went back to his childhood club, Cruzeiro.

== International career ==
On 30 October 2012, Silva was called up to Brazil under-20s, for friendlies against Paraguay. He was also called up to the under-21s for 2014 Toulon Tournament, appearing in four matches and scoring once during the competition.

== Career statistics ==
As of 30 May 2024.

Appearances by club, season and competition
Club	Season	League			State League (Note: Includes Campeonato Mineiro and Campeonato Gaúcho)		Cup		Continental (Note: Includes Copa Libertadores, Copa Sudamericana, UEFA Champions League and UEFA Europa League)		Other (Note: Includes Coupe de la Ligue)		Total	
Club	Season	Division	Apps	Goals	Apps	Goals	Apps	Goals	Apps	Goals	Apps	Goals	Apps	Goals
Cruzeiro	2012	Série A	8	0	0	0	—		—		—		8	0
Cruzeiro	2013	Série A	23	2	2	0	3	0	—		—		28	2
Cruzeiro	2014	Série A	27	1	9	0	4	0	8	0	—		48	1
Cruzeiro	Total		58	3	11	0	7	0	8	0	—		84	3
Nacional-MG (loan)	2012	Mineiro	—		1	0	—		—		—		1	0
Real Madrid	2014–15	La Liga	8	0	—		0	0	1	0	—		9	0
Marseille (loan)	2015–16	Ligue 1	22	0	—		3	0	6	0	2	0	33	0
Cruzeiro (loan)	2017	Série A	14	0	9	1	7	0	0	0	—		30	1
Cruzeiro (loan)	2018	Série A	23	0	6	0	1	0	8	1	—		38	1
Cruzeiro (loan)	2019	Série A	3	0	10	0	0	0	1	0	—		14	0
Cruzeiro (loan)	Total		40	0	25	0	8	0	9	1	—		82	2
Grêmio	2020	Série A	32	1	14	0	6	0	6	0	—		58	1
Grêmio	2021	Série A	25	2	10	1	6	0	7	0	—		48	3
Grêmio	2022	Série B	22	0	10	1	1	0	—		—		33	1
Grêmio	2023	Série A	4	0	5	0	2	0	—		—		11	0
Grêmio	Total		83	3	39	2	15	0	13	0	—		150	5
Cruzeiro	2023	Série A	20	0	0	0	0	0	—		—		20	0
Cruzeiro	2024	Série A	5	1	11	0	1	0	3	1	—		20	2
Cruzeiro	Total		25	1	11	0	1	0	3	1	—		40	2
Career total			236	7	87	3	34	0	40	2	2	0	399	12

== Honours ==
=== Club ===
Cruzeiro

- Campeonato Brasileiro Série A: 2013, 2014
- Copa do Brasil: 2017, 2018
- Campeonato Mineiro: 2014, 2018, 2019, 2026

Grêmio

- Campeonato Gaúcho: 2020, 2021, 2022, 2023
- Recopa Gaúcha: 2021, 2022, 2023

=== International ===
Brazil U21

- Toulon Tournament: 2014

=== Individual ===
- Campeonato Brasileiro Série A Team of the Year: 2014
