= 2014 Campeonato Mineiro =

Football championship of Minas Gerais, Brazil

Campeonato Mineiro
- Season: 2014
- Dates: 26 January – 13 April
- Champions: Cruzeiro
- Relegated: Nacional Esporte Clube; Minas Boca
- Matches: 72
- Goals: 168 (2.33 per match)
- Top goalscorer: Mancini (Villa Nova); 7 goals

The 2014 Campeonato Mineiro was the 100th edition of the state championship of Minas Gerais organized by the FMF. The competition began on 26 January and ended on 13 April 2014.

The competition was won by Cruzeiro winning their 36th Campeonato Mineiro. The final consisted of two 0-0 draws between Cruzeiro and Atlético Mineiro so Cruzeiro won the title by virtue of their superior performance in the first stage. Cruzeiro were unbeaten throughout the competition.

== Format ==
=== First stage ===
The 2014 Módulo I first stage was contested by 12 clubs in a single round-robin tournament. The four best-placed teams qualified for the final stage and the bottom two teams were relegated to the 2015 Módulo II. The two best-placed teams not already qualified for the 2014 seasons of the Série A, Série B or Série C, gained berths in the 2014 Série D.

=== Knockout stage ===
The knockout stage was played between the 4 best-placed teams from the previous stage in a two-legged tie. If two teams tied on aggregate goals, the team that had the better results in the first stage would win the tie.

== Participating teams ==
Locations of the 2014 Campeonato Mineiro teams

Team	Home city	2013 result
América Mineiro	Belo Horizonte	8th
Atlético Mineiro	Belo Horizonte	1st
Boa Esporte	Varginha	9th
Caldense	Poços de Caldas	6th
Cruzeiro	Belo Horizonte	2nd
Guarani	Divinópolis	7th
Minas Boca	Sete Lagoas	2nd (Módulo II)
Nacional	Patos de Minas	10th
Tombense	Tombos	4th
Tupi	Juiz de Fora	5th
URT	Patos de Minas	1st (Módulo II)
Villa Nova	Nova Lima	3rd

== First stage ==
Pos	Team	Pld	W	D	L	GF	GA	GD	Pts	Qualification or relegation	CRU	ATM	AME	BOA	TUP	VIL	TOM	CAL	URT	GUA	NAC	MIN
1	Cruzeiro	11	9	2	0	24	4	+20	29	Knockout stage	—		2–0		2–1	3–1			1–0	2–0		4–0
2	Atlético Mineiro	11	7	2	2	20	8	+12	23	Knockout stage	0–0	—	3–2	3–0			0–2	2–0			2–1	
3	América Mineiro	11	5	3	3	14	12	+2	18	Knockout stage			—	2–0	1–1	1–1			1–0		2–1	
4	Boa Esporte	11	5	1	5	12	14	−2	16	Knockout stage	1–3			—		2–1		1–0		1–2	1–0	
5	Tupi	11	4	3	4	11	11	0	15			2–0		1–0	—	0–0				1–2	1–0	3–1
6	Villa Nova	11	4	3	4	15	17	−2	15			1–4				—	1–3		3–1	1–0	3–1	2–1
7	Tombense	11	3	5	3	11	11	0	14		0–3		0–0	0–0	1–1		—	1–1		1–1		
8	Caldense	11	3	4	4	10	9	+1	13		0–0		1–2		3–0	1–1		—	1–0		2–0	
9	URT	11	4	0	7	9	19	−10	12			0–5		1–4	1–0		2–1		—			3–1
10	Guarani	11	3	2	6	11	14	−3	11			0–1	1–2					0–0	0–1	—		3–1
11	Nacional (R)	11	3	1	7	10	17	−7	10	2015 Módulo II	1–4						1–0		2–0	3–2	—	0–0
12	Minas Boca (R)	11	2	2	7	10	21	−11	8	2015 Módulo II		0–0	2–1	1–2			1–2	2–1				—

Source: Soccerway
Legend: Blue = home team win; Yellow = draw; Red = away team win.
Rules for classification: 1) Points; 2) Wins; 3) Goal difference; 4) Goals scored; 5) Head-to-head results (only if two teams are tied); 6) Fewest red cards received; 7) Fewest yellow cards received; 8) Extra game.
(R) Relegated

=== Semi-finals ===
23 March 2014
16:00

América Mineiro	1–4	Atlético Mineiro
Tchô 86'	Report	Nicolás Otamendi 2'; Jô 36'; Guilherme 41'; Neto Berola 48'

Estádio Independência, Belo Horizonte
Attendance: 7,943
Referee: Cleisson Veloso Pereira

30 March 2014
18:30

Atlético Mineiro	1–1	América Mineiro
Neto Berola 47'	Report	Carlos Renato 4'

Estádio Antônio Guimarães de Almeida, Tombos
Attendance: 12,012
Referee: Igor Junior Benevenuto

Atlético Mineiro advanced to the finals.

23 March 2014
18:30

Boa Esporte	0–1	Cruzeiro
	Report	Baptista 87'

Melão, Varginha
Attendance: 3,308
Referee: Igor Junior Benevenuto

30 March 2014
16:00

Cruzeiro	2–1	Boa Esporte
Dagoberto 30'; Bruno Rodrigo 62'	Report	Mateus 52'

Mineirão, Belo Horizonte
Attendance: 12,587
Referee: Emerson De Almeida Ferreira

Cruzeiro advanced to the finals.

=== Finals ===
6 April 2014
16:00

Atlético Mineiro	0–0	Cruzeiro
	Report

Estádio Independência, Belo Horizonte
Attendance: 22,342
Referee: Francisco Carlos do Nascimento

13 April 2014
16:30

Cruzeiro	0–0	Atlético Mineiro
	Report

Mineirão, Belo Horizonte
Attendance: 48,818
Referee: Pericles Bassols Pegado Cortez

Tied 0–0 on aggregate, Cruzeiro were declared champions due to their better performance in the first stage.

== Final classification ==
Pos	Team	Pld	W	D	L	GF	GA	GD	Pts	Qualification or relegation
1	Cruzeiro (C)	11	9	2	0	24	4	+20	29	Qualification for the 2015 Copa do Brasil
2	Atlético Mineiro	11	7	2	2	20	8	+12	23	Qualification for the 2015 Copa do Brasil
3	América Mineiro	11	5	3	3	14	12	+2	18	Qualification for the 2015 Copa do Brasil
4	Boa Esporte	11	5	1	5	12	14	−2	16	Qualification for the 2015 Copa do Brasil
5	Tupi (Note: Eventually qualified for the 2015 Copa do Brasil due to Cruzeiro winning the 2014 Campeonato Brasileiro Série A)	11	4	3	4	11	11	0	15	
6	Villa Nova (Note: Eventually qualified for the 2015 Copa do Brasil due to Atlético Mineiro winning the 2014 Copa do Brasil)	11	4	3	4	15	17	−2	15	Qualification for 2014 Série D
7	Tombense	11	3	5	3	11	11	0	14	Qualification for 2014 Série D
8	Caldense	11	3	4	4	10	9	+1	13	
9	URT	11	4	0	7	9	19	−10	12	
10	Guarani	11	3	2	6	11	14	−3	11	
11	Nacional (R)	11	3	1	7	10	17	−7	10	Relegated to Módulo II for 2015
12	Minas Boca (R)	11	2	2	7	10	21	−11	8	Relegated to Módulo II for 2015

Source: Soccerway
(C) Champions; (R) Relegated

== Top goalscorers ==
Rank	Player	Club	Goals
1	(Brazil) Mancini	Villa Nova	7
2	(Brazil) Obina	América Mineiro	6
2	(Brazil) Tchô	América Mineiro	6
3	(Brazil) Alexandre	Boa Esporte	5
3	(Brazil) Núbio Flávio	Tupi	5
4	(Brazil) Bruno Aquino	Boa Esporte	4
4	(Brazil) Dagoberto	Cruzeiro	4
4	(Brazil) Guilherme	Atlético Mineiro	4
4	(Brazil) Jô	Atlético Mineiro	4
4	(Bolivia) Marcelo Moreno	Cruzeiro	4
4	(Brazil) Tardelli	Guarani	4
