= 2012 Cruzeiro EC season =

Cruzeiro
2012 season
- President: Gilvan Tavares
- Manager: Vágner Mancini (until 10 May 2012) Celso Roth
- Campeonato Brasileiro Série A: 9th
- Campeonato Mineiro: Semifinalists
- Copa do Brasil: Round of 16
- Top goalscorer: League: Wellington Paulista (10); All: Wellington Paulista
- Highest home attendance: 17,901 vs Atlético Mineiro (26 August 2012)

The 2012 season was Cruzeiro's 42nd consecutive season in the top flight of Brazilian football, playing in every edition of the Campeonato Brasileiro's first division. The team finished in 9th the league, reached the Round of 16 of the Copa do Brasil and the semifinals of the Campeonato Mineiro.

== Team kits ==
The team kits for the 2012 season are produced by Olympikus and sponsored by Banco BMG and Guaramix.

== Squads ==
=== First-team squad ===
No.	Name	Nationality	Position (s)	Date of Birth (Age)	Signed from
Goalkeepers
1	Fábio	(Brazil)	GK	30 September 1980 (age 44)	(Brazil) Vasco da Gama
12	Rafael	(Brazil)	GK	23 June 1989 (age 36)	Youth product
-	Axel	(Brazil)	GK	21 October 1975 (age 49)	Youth product
Defenders
-	Ceará	(Brazil)	RB	18 June 1980 (age 45)	(France) PSG
-	Mayke	(Brazil)	RB	10 November 1992 (age 32)	Youth product
-	Léo	(Brazil)	CB	30 January 1988 (age 37)	(Brazil) Palmeiras
-	Rafael Donato	(Brazil)	CB	17 March 1989 (age 36)	(Brazil) Bahia
-	Thiago Carvalho	(Brazil)	CB	24 June 1988 (age 37)	(Brazil) Boa Esporte
-	Victorino	(Uruguay)	CB	11 October 1982 (age 42)	Universidad de Chile
-	Mateus	(Brazil)	CB	1 May 1984 (age 41)	(Brazil) Portuguesa de Desportos
-	Alex Silva	(Brazil)	CB	10 March 1985 (age 40)	(Brazil) Flamengo (on loan)
-	Diego Renan	(Brazil)	Right back/Left back	26 January 1990 (age 35)	Youth product
-	Vinícius Freitas	(Brazil)	LB	7 March 1993 (age 32)	Youth product
Midfielders
-	Leandro Guerreiro	(Brazil)	CM / DM / CM	17 November 1978 (age 46)	(Brazil) Botafogo
-	Willian Magrão	(Brazil)	DM / CM / CB	11 February 1987 (age 38)	(Brazil) Grêmio (on loan)
-	Marcelo Oliveira	(Brazil)	CM / LM	29 March 1987 (age 38)	(Brazil) Corinthians
-	Charles	(Brazil)	DM / CM	14 February 1985 (age 40)	(Russia) Lokomotiv Moscow
-	Everton	(Brazil)	CM / LM / LB	8 August 1984 (age 40)	(Brazil) Fluminense
-	Diego Arias	(Colombia)	CM	15 June 1985 (age 40)	(Greece) PAOK
-	Sandro Silva	(Brazil)	DM	29 April 1984 (age 41)	(Spain) Málaga (on loan)
-	Lucas Silva	(Brazil)	CM / LM	16 February 1993 (age 32)	Youth product
-	Tinga	(Brazil)	AM / CM / LM	13 January 1978 (age 47)	(Brazil) Internacional
-	Souza	(Brazil)	AM	4 February 1979 (age 46)	(Brazil) Fluminense
-	Élber	(Brazil)	AM / RW	27 May 1992 (age 33)	Youth product
-	Montillo	(Argentina)	AM	14 April 1984 (age 41)	Universidad de Chile
Forwards
-	Martinuccio	(Argentina)	LW	16 December 1987 (age 37)	(Brazil) Fluminense (on loan)
-	Fabinho	(Brazil)	RW / LW	7 September 1983 (age 41)	(Brazil) Guarani
-	Wallyson	(Brazil)	RW / LW	17 October 1988 (age 36)	(Brazil) Atlético-PR
-	Borges	(Brazil)	CF / ST	5 October 1980 (age 44)	(Brazil) Santos
-	Wellington Paulista	(Brazil)	CF / ST	22 April 1983 (age 42)	(Brazil) Botafogo
-	Anselmo Ramon	(Brazil)	CF / ST	23 June 1988 (age 37)	Youth product

== Club ==
=== Coaching staff ===
Position	Name	Nationality
Head coach	Celso Roth	Brazilian
Assistant coach	Humberto Ferreira	Brazilian
Goalkeeping coach	Robertinho	Brazilian
Fitness coaches	Flavio de Oliveira	Brazilian
Fitness coaches	Quintiliano Lemos	Brazilian
Fitness coaches	Eduardo Freitas	Brazilian
Physiologists	Eduardo Pimenta	Brazilian
Physiologists	Rodrigo Morandi	Brazilian
Physiotherapists	André Rocha	Brazilian
Physiotherapists	Charles Costa	Brazilian
Physiotherapists	Ronner Bolognani	Brazilian
Physiotherapists	João Salomão	Brazilian
Doctors	Sérgio Freire Júnior	Brazilian
Doctors	Walace Espada	Brazilian
Doctors	Leonardo Corradi	Brazilian
Masseurs	Barjão	Brazilian
Masseurs	Edmar Antônio Silva	Brazilian
Masseurs	Hélio Gomes	Brazilian
