= Elisson (footballer) =

Brazilian footballer (born 1987)

Personal information
- Full name: Elisson Aparecido Rosa
- Date of birth: 26 March 1987 (age 39)
- Place of birth: Belo Horizonte, Brazil
- Height: 1.87 m (6 ft 2 in)
- Position: Goalkeeper

Team information
- Current team: Caldense

Youth career
- 2000–2007: Cruzeiro

Senior career*
Years	Team	Apps	(Gls)
2007–2019	Cruzeiro	1	(0)
2008	→ Itaúna (loan)	30	(0)
2009	→ Rio Branco (loan)	22	(0)
2009–2011	→ Nacional (loan)	4	(0)
2012	→ Villa Nova (loan)	10	(0)
2013	→ Rio Verde (loan)	8	(0)
2016	→ Coritiba (loan)	8	(0)
2017	→ Villa Nova (loan)	14	(0)
2018	→ Nacional SP (loan)	0	(0)
2019	→ Ipatinga (loan)	10	(0)
2019	→ Figueirense (loan)	3	(0)
2020	Brasiliense	1	(0)
2021	Juventus-SC	0	(0)
2021	Ipatinga	11	(0)
2022	Betim Futebol	5	(0)
2023–	Caldense	0	(0)
- * Club domestic league appearances and goals as of 17:21, 28 December 2022 (UTC)

Elisson Aparecido Rosa (born 26 March 1987), simply known as Elisson, is a Brazilian footballer who plays as a goalkeeper for Caldense.

== Honours ==
Cruzeiro

- Campeonato Brasileiro Série A: 2013, 2014
- Campeonato Mineiro: 2014
