= Willian Farias =

Brazilian footballer

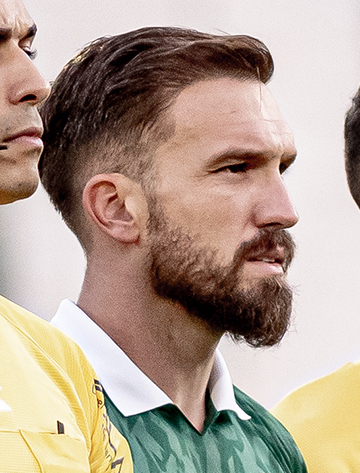
- Farias with Guarani in 2026

Personal information
- Full name: Willian Roberto de Farias
- Date of birth: 6 June 1989 (age 37)
- Place of birth: Curitiba, Brazil
- Height: 1.78 m (5 ft 10 in)
- Position: Defensive midfielder

Team information
- Current team: Guarani
- Number: 3

Youth career
- 2000–2009: Coritiba

Senior career*
Years	Team	Apps	(Gls)
2009–2014	Coritiba	128	(1)
2014–2016	Cruzeiro	27	(0)
2016	→ Vitória (loan)	44	(2)
2017–2018	Vitória	41	(0)
2019	São Paulo	5	(0)
2019–2020	Sport Recife	25	(0)
2020–2021	Hatta	8	(0)
2021–2023	Coritiba	79	(1)
2024–2025	Novorizontino	60	(1)
2026–	Guarani	22	(2)
- * Club domestic league appearances and goals as of 10 November 2026

Willian Roberto de Farias (born 6 June 1989), known as Willian Farias, is a Brazilian professional footballer who plays as a defensive midfielder for Guarani.

== Honours ==
Coritiba

- Campeonato Paranaense: 2010, 2011, 2012, 2013, 2022
- Campeonato Brasileiro Série B: 2010

Cruzeiro

- Campeonato Mineiro: 2014
- Campeonato Brasileiro Série A: 2014

Vitória

- Campeonato Baiano: 2016, 2017
