= Almeidão (Minas Gerais) =

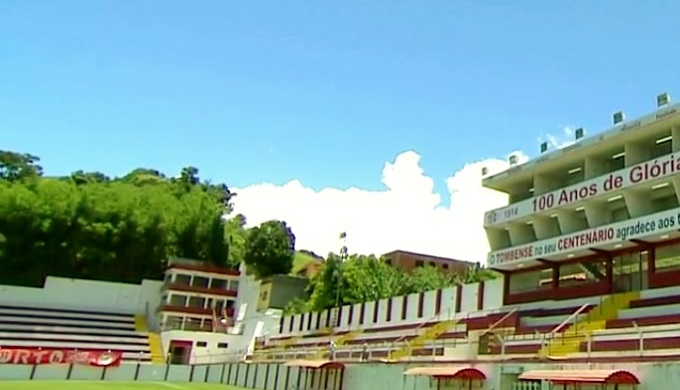
- Interactive map of Almeidão
- Full name: Estádio Antônio Guimarães de Almeida
- Location: Tombos, Minas Gerais, Brazil
- Coordinates: 20°54′27″S 42°1′49″W
- Owner: Tombense
- Capacity: 6,555
- Surface: Grass
- Field size: 105 x 68 m

Construction
- Expanded: 2013

Tenant
- Tombense

Estádio Antônio Guimarães de Almeida is a stadium located in Tombos, Brazil. It is used mostly for football matches and hosts the home matches of Tombense. The stadium had a maximum capacity of 3,050 people, but after a renovation made in 2023, now the maximum capacity is 6,555 people.
