= Léo (footballer, born 1988) =

Brazilian footballer

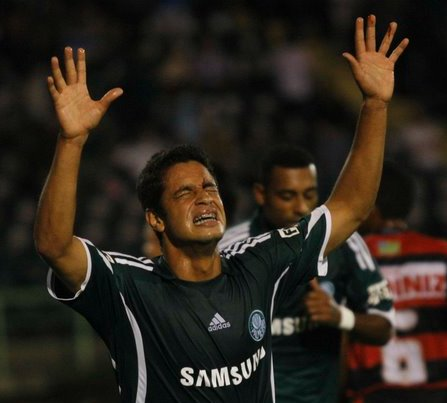
- Léo with Palmeiras in 2010

Personal information
- Full name: Leonardo Renan Simões de Lacerda
- Date of birth: 30 January 1988 (age 38)
- Place of birth: Belo Horizonte, Brazil
- Height: 1.85 m (6 ft 1 in)
- Position: Centre back

Youth career
- 2000–2007: Grêmio

Senior career*
Years	Team	Apps	(Gls)
2007–2009	Grêmio	81	(6)
2010	Palmeiras	19	(2)
2010–2021	Cruzeiro	300	(15)
2022	Chapecoense	29	(2)
- * Club domestic league appearances and goals as of 11 October 2022

Leonardo Renan Simões de Lacerda (born 30 January 1988), commonly known as Léo, is a Brazilian footballer who plays as a central defender.

== Club career ==
=== Grêmio ===
Born in Contagem, Minas Gerais, Léo joined Grêmio's youth setup at the age of 12. He made his first team – and Série A – debut on 25 July 2007, coming on as a first-half substitute for Itaqui in a 2–0 away win over Náutico.

Léo scored his first professional goal for Grêmio on 16 September 2007, netting the winner in a 1–0 home success over rivals Internacional. He then became a regular starter for the side, and helped the club finish second in the 2008 Série A.

=== Palmeiras ===
On 18 December 2009, Léo moved to fellow top tier side Palmeiras on a five-year contract, with Maurício moving in the opposite direction on loan; Grêmio also saw R$ 6.5 million of a R$8 million debt being discounted on the move. He made his club debut the following 16 January, starting and scoring his team's second in a 5–1 Campeonato Paulista home routing of Mogi Mirim.

Léo began the season as a starter, but was subsequently overtaken by Maurício Ramos and Edinho.

=== Cruzeiro ===
On 13 August 2010, Léo moved to Cruzeiro for a fee of R$1 million plus Leandro Amaro. Initially a backup to Edcarlos and Gil, he subsequently became a regular starter in the 2011 season onwards, when both left the club.

Léo was also a part of the Cruzeiro squad which won two consecutive Série A titles in 2013 and 2014, aside from winning four Campeonato Mineiro titles. He struggled with injuries during the 2019 and 2020 campaigns, with his side suffering a first-ever relegation in the former.

On 20 May 2021, after nearly eleven years and 401 matches with Cruzeiro, Léo left the club after rescinding his contract.

== Club statistics ==
As of 14 December 2021

Club	Season	League			State League		National Cup		Continental		Other		Total	
Club	Season	Division	Apps	Goals	Apps	Goals	Apps	Goals	Apps	Goals	Apps	Goals	Apps	Goals
Grêmio	2007	Série A	20	1	—		—		—		—		20	1
Grêmio	2008	Série A	25	3	1	0	—		2 (Note: Appearance(s) in Copa Sudamericana)	0	—		28	4
Grêmio	2009	Série A	26	2	9	0	—		11 (Note: Appearance(s) in Copa Libertadores)	2	—		20	1
Grêmio	Total		71	6	10	0	—		13	2	—		94	8
Palmeiras	2010	Série A	8	0	11	2	6	1	—		—		25	3
Cruzeiro	2010	Série A	16	1	—		—		—		—		16	1
Cruzeiro	2011	Série A	27	0	3	0	—		—		—		30	0
Cruzeiro	2012	Série A	26	1	10	0	4	1	—		—		40	2
Cruzeiro	2013	Série A	13	1	8	3	4	1	—		—		25	4
Cruzeiro	2014	Série A	29	2	5	2	7	1	2	0	—		43	5
Cruzeiro	2015	Série A	5	0	11	0	—		7	0	—		23	1
Cruzeiro	2016	Série A	15	0	3	0	7	0	—		0	0	25	0
Cruzeiro	2017	Série A	26	1	13	1	13	0	2	0	1 (Note: Appearance(s) in Primeira Liga)	0	55	2
Cruzeiro	2018	Série A	31	0	9	0	8	0	9	1	—		57	1
Cruzeiro	2019	Série A	18	0	14	2	5	0	8	0	—		45	2
Cruzeiro	2020	Série B	10	1	8	0	3	0	—		—		21	1
Cruzeiro	2021	Série B	0	0	0	0	0	0	—		—		0	0
Cruzeiro	Total		216	7	84	8	51	3	28	1	1	0	380	19
Career total			295	13	105	10	57	4	41	3	1	0	499	30

== Honours ==
Grêmio

- Campeonato Gaúcho: 2007

Cruzeiro

- Campeonato Mineiro: 2011, 2014, 2018, 2019
- Campeonato Brasileiro Série A: 2013, 2014
- Copa do Brasil: 2017, 2018
