= Marquinhos (footballer, born October 1989) =

Brazilian footballer

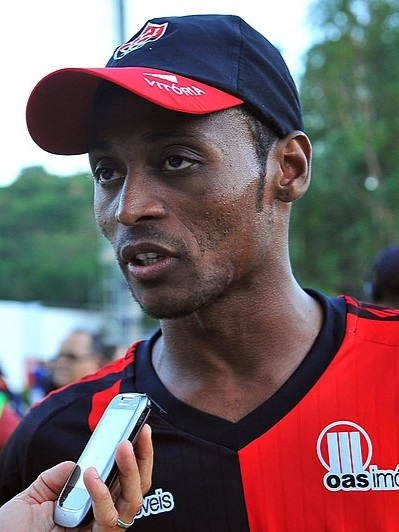
- Marquinhos in 2012

Personal information
- Full name: Marcos Antônio da Silva Gonçalves
- Date of birth: 19 October 1989 (age 37)
- Place of birth: Prado, Bahia, Brazil
- Height: 1.75 m (5 ft 9 in)
- Position: Winger

Team information
- Current team: CSA
- Number: 23

Youth career
- 2002–2009: Vitória

Senior career*
Years	Team	Apps	(Gls)
2008–2014	Vitória	193	(58)
2009–2010	→ Palmeiras (loan)	34	(0)
2010–2011	→ Flamengo (loan)	14	(1)
2014–2015	Cruzeiro	59	(10)
2016–2018	Internacional	19	(1)
2017	→ Sport do Recife (loan)	20	(1)
2018	→ América-MG (loan)	26	(1)
2019	Guarani	4	(0)
2020	Bahia de Feira	1	(0)
2020–2021	Pegasus	18	(8)
2021–	CSA	4	(1)

International career^{‡}
2008–2009	Brazil U20	0	(0)
- * Club domestic league appearances and goals as of 10 June 2021 ‡ National team caps and goals as of 20 March 2021

Marcos Antônio da Silva Gonçalves (born 17 October 1989 in Prado, Bahia), commonly known as Marquinhos, is a Brazilian professional footballer who plays as a winger for CSA.

== Club career ==
In 2008, Marquinhos was discovered in Vitória's youth squads and made his professional debut in the Campeonato Baiano. Later, in the Campeonato Brasileiro, he was considered one of the best young players of the season; playing almost every game in the first team despite being only 18 years old.

In November 2020, Marquinhos joined Hong Kong Premier League club Pegasus.

== Career statistics ==
=== Club ===
(Correct as of June 8, 2011)

Appearances and goals by club, season and competition
Club	Season	State League		Brazilian Série A		Copa do Brasil		Copa Libertadores		Copa Sudamericana		Total	
Club	Season	Apps	Goals	Apps	Goals	Apps	Goals	Apps	Goals	Apps	Goals	Apps	Goals
Vitória	2008	—		31	7	—		—		—		31	7
Total		-	-	31	7	-	-	-	-	-	-	31	7
Palmeiras	2009	14	0	8	0	—		5	0	—		27	0
Palmeiras	2010	3	0	1	0	3	0	—		—		7	0
Total		17	0	9	0	3	0	5	0	-	-	34	0
Flamengo	2010	—		9	1	—		—		—		9	1
Flamengo	2011	5	0	—		—		—		—		5	0
Total		5	0	9	1	-	-	-	-	-	-	14	1
Vitória	2011	—		0	0	—		—		—		0	0
Total		-	-	0	0	-	-	-	-	-	-	0	0
Career total		22	0	49	8	3	0	5	0	-	-	78	8

according to combined sources on Flamengo official website and Flaestatística.

== Honours ==
Vitória

- Bahia State Championship: 2008, 2013

Flamengo

- Taça Guanabara: 2011
- Taça Rio: 2011
- Rio de Janeiro State League: 2011

Cruzeiro

- Campeonato Brasileiro Série A: 2014
