= Núbio Flávio =

Brazilian footballer

Núbio Flavio
Personal information
- Full name: Núbio Flávio Martins de Souza
- Date of birth: 25 May 1992 (age 34)
- Place of birth: Timóteo, Brazil
- Position: Forward

Youth career
- América Mineiro

Senior career*
Years	Team	Apps	(Gls)
2012	Inter de Bebedouro	5	(0)
2013–2014	Tupi	17	(4)
2014	Icasa	19	(2)
2015–2017	Atlético Paranaense	0	(0)
2016	→ Fortaleza (loan)	1	(0)
2016	→ Paraná (loan)	4	(0)
2017	→ Tigres do Brasil (loan)	0	(0)
2017	Dila	26	(5)
2018	Villa Nova	0	(0)
2018–2019	Volta Redonda	27	(7)
2019	→ Tupynambás (loan)	0	(0)
2020	ABC	0	(0)
- * Club domestic league appearances and goals as of 18:55, 26 July 2020 (UTC)

Núbio Flávio Martins de Souza (born 25 May 1992) is a Brazilian footballer who plays as a forward.

== Club career ==
Born in Timóteo, Flávio is a graduate of the América Mineiro youth setup and joined Tupi Football Club in 2013. In the following year, he joined Icasa; ending the 2015 season as the top scorer of the Campeonato Cearense with 10 goals.

On 22 May 2015, Flávio moved to Atlético Paranaense but was loaned to Fortaleza Esporte Clube on 16 December for the 2016 season, without having made any single appearance for Atlético Paranaense.

On 14 September 2016, Flávio was loaned to Paraná Clube for the rest of the season On 17 September, he made his debut in a 2–0 defeat against Atlético Goianiense.

After a loan stint with Tigres do Brasil in 2017, Flávio moved to Georgian club FC Dila Gori in April.
