= Hugo Ragelli =

Brazilian footballer (born 1995)

Personal information
- Full name: Hugo Ragelli Oliveira Andrade
- Date of birth: 2 May 1995 (age 31)
- Place of birth: Montes Claros, Brazil
- Height: 1.86 m (6 ft 1 in)
- Position: Forward

Youth career
- 2010–2013: Palmeiras
- 2014–2017: Cruzeiro

Senior career*
Years	Team	Apps	(Gls)
2014–2018	Cruzeiro	1	(1)
2016	→ Ponte Preta (loan)	0	(0)
2016–2017	→ Gil Vicente (loan)	15	(1)
2018	→ Coimbra (loan)	0	(0)
2019	Tupi	4	(0)
2019–2020	Nacional-AM	3	(0)
2020	Inter de Limeira	6	(2)
2021	Próspera	4	(0)
- * Club domestic league appearances and goals as of 25 April 2026

Hugo Ragelli Oliveira Andrade (born 2 May 1995), known as Hugo Ragelli, is a Brazilian former professional footballer who played as a forward.

== Club career ==
He made his professional debut in the Campeonato Brasileiro Série A for Cruzeiro on 30 November 2014 in a game against Chapecoense and scored an equalizer for his team in 1–1 draw.

Ragelli played for Nacional-AM, Inter de Limeira and Próspera in the final years of his career, retiring in 2021.

== Honours ==
Cruzeiro

- Campeonato Brasileiro: 2014
