= Marlone =

Brazilian footballer (born 1992)

Personal information
- Full name: Johnath Marlone Azevedo da Silva
- Date of birth: April 2, 1992 (age 34)
- Place of birth: Augustinópolis, Brazil
- Height: 1.80 m (5 ft 11 in)
- Position: Attacking midfielder

Team information
- Current team: Chapecoense
- Number: 8

Youth career
- 2005–2012: Vasco da Gama

Senior career*
Years	Team	Apps	(Gls)
2012–2013	Vasco da Gama	44	(4)
2014	Cruzeiro	30	(1)
2015	Fluminense	14	(0)
2015	→ Sport (loan)	35	(3)
2016–2019	Corinthians	44	(8)
2017	→ Atlético Mineiro (loan)	19	(3)
2018	→ Sport (loan)	45	(7)
2019	→ Goiás (loan)	33	(6)
2020	Suwon	17	(2)
2021	Brusque	6	(0)
2022–2023	Vila Nova	39	(4)
2024–	Chapecoense	11	(0)
- * Club domestic league appearances and goals as of 16:46, 2 November 2023 (UTC)

Johnath Marlone Azevedo da Silva (born 2 April 1992), commonly known as Marlone, is a Brazilian footballer who plays as an attacking midfielder for Chapecoense. He is best known for scoring a bicycle kick in a 6–0 win over Cobresal in the 2016 Copa Libertadores that was nominated for the FIFA Puskás Award.

== Career statistics ==
As of match played 17 November 2024

Appearances and goals by club, season and competition
Club	Season	League			State League		Cup		Continental		Other		Total	
Club	Season	Division	Apps	Goals	Apps	Goals	Apps	Goals	Apps	Goals	Apps	Goals	Apps	Goals
Vasco da Gama	2012	Série A	9	0	0	0	0	0	—		—		9	0
Vasco da Gama	2013	Série A	26	3	5	0	3	1	—		—		35	4
Vasco da Gama	Total		35	3	5	0	3	1	—		—		43	4
Cruzeiro	2014	Série A	13	0	9	1	5	0	3	0	—		30	1
Fluminense	2015	Série A	1	0	12	0	—		—		—		13	0
Sport (loan)	2015	Série A	30	3	—		1	0	4	0	—		35	3
Corinthians	2016	Série A	24	6	5	0	4	0	2	2	—		35	8
Corinthians	2017	Série A	—		6	0	3	0	—		—		9	0
Corinthians	Total		24	6	11	0	7	0	2	2	—		44	8
Atlético Mineiro (loan)	2017	Série A	12	2	5	1	—		—		2	0	19	3
Sport (loan)	2018	Série A	30	2	13	4	2	1	—		—		20	6
Goiás (loan)	2019	Série A	16	2	14	4	2	0	—		1	0	33	6
Suwon FC	2020	K League 2	18	2	—		0	0	—		0	0	18	2
Brusque	2021	Série B	6	0	—		—		—		—		6	0
Vila Nova	2022	Série B	12	0	—		—		—		3	0	15	0
Vila Nova	2023	Série B	15	2	12	2	2	0	—		3	0	32	4
Vila Nova	Total		27	2	12	2	2	0	—		6	0	47	4
Chapecoense	2024	Série B	26	0	8	0	—		—		—		34	0
Career Total			238	22	89	12	22	2	9	2	9	0	367	38

== Honours ==
Cruzeiro

- Campeonato Mineiro: 2014
- Campeonato Brasileiro Série A: 2014

Atlético Mineiro

- Campeonato Mineiro: 2017
