= Rodrigo Souza =

Brazilian footballer

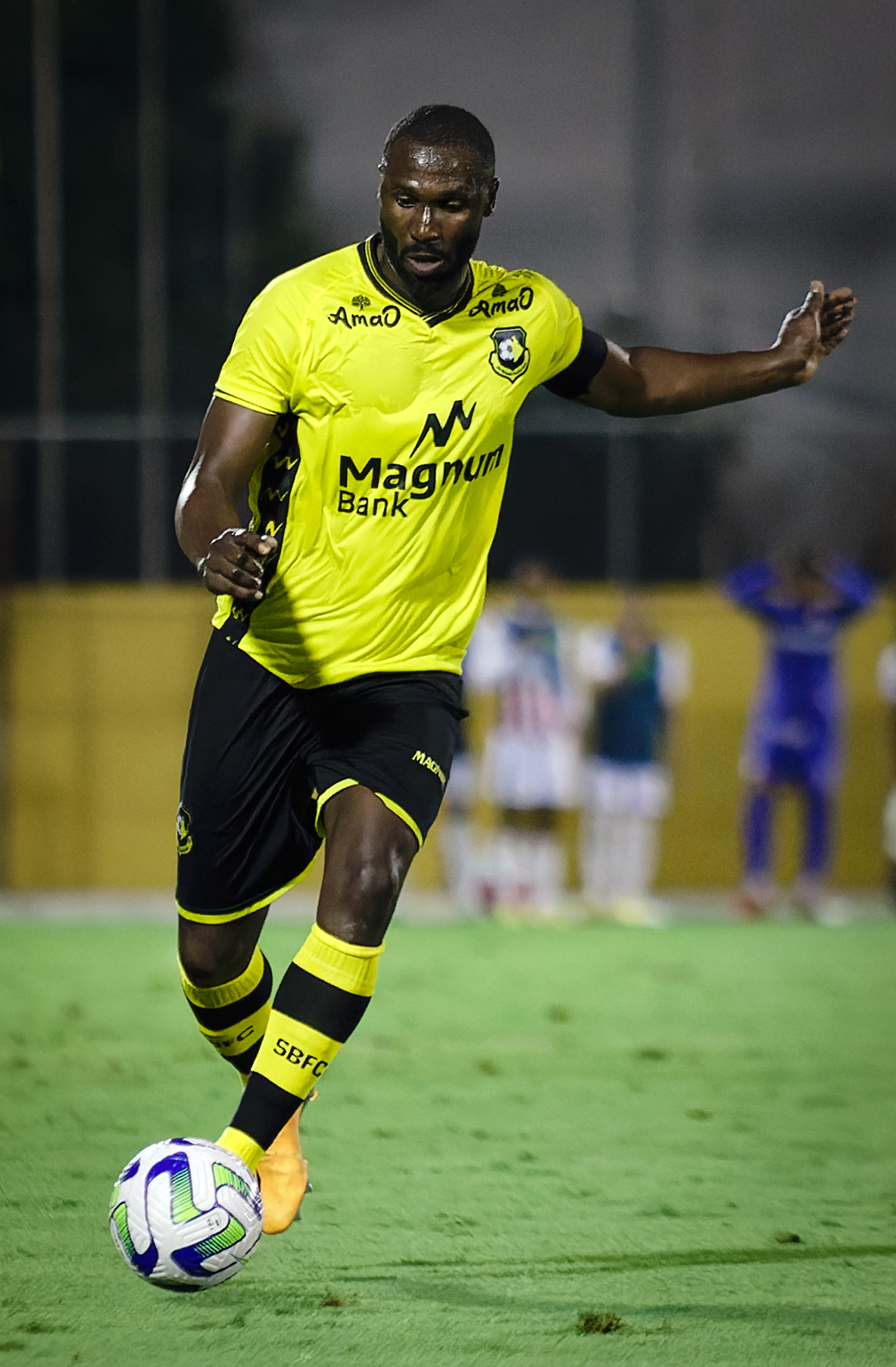
- Rodrigo Souza with São Bernardo in 2023

Personal information
- Full name: Rodrigo de Souza Fonseca
- Date of birth: 27 October 1987 (age 39)
- Place of birth: São Gonçalo, Brazil
- Height: 1.86 m (6 ft 1 in)
- Position: Defensive midfielder

Team information
- Current team: Ponte Preta
- Number: 5

Senior career*
Years	Team	Apps	(Gls)
2009	Duque de Caxias		
2010	XSKT Cần Thơ		
2013–2014	Sampaio Corrêa		
2013	→ Boa Esporte (loan)	25	(1)
2014–2015	Cruzeiro	8	(0)
2014	→ Criciúma (loan)	24	(3)
2015	→ Penapolense (loan)	7	(0)
2015	→ América MG (loan)	15	(1)
2016–2017	Náutico	54	(2)
2017	CRB	14	(0)
2018	Nacional SP	12	(1)
2018–2019	Oeste	24	(1)
2019	Boa Esporte	10	(0)
2020–2024	São Bernardo	87	(3)
2025–	Ponte Preta	34	(0)
- * Club domestic league appearances and goals as of 18 November 2026

Rodrigo de Souza Fonseca (born 27 October 1987 in São Gonçalo), better known as Rodrigo Souza, is a Brazilian footballer who plays as a defensive midfielder for Ponte Preta.

== Honours ==
Madureira

- Copa Rio: 2011

Cruzeiro

- Campeonato Mineiro: 2014

São Bernardo

- Campeonato Paulista Série A2: 2021
