= Bruno Rodrigo =

Brazilian footballer (born 1985)

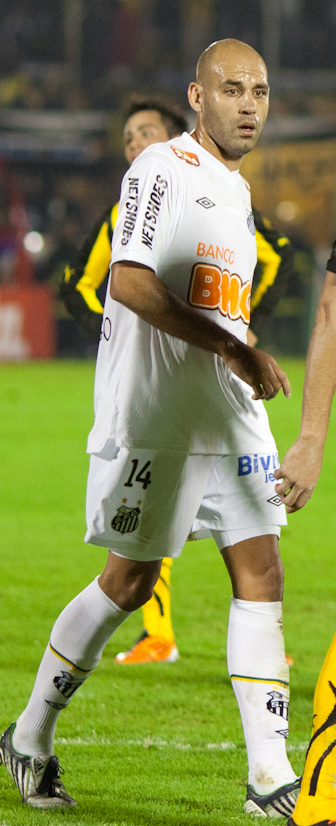
- Bruno Rodrigo playing for Santos before the first leg of the 2011 Copa Libertadores finals

Personal information
- Full name: Bruno Rodrigo Fenelon Palomo
- Date of birth: 12 April 1985 (age 41)
- Place of birth: Andradina, Brazil
- Height: 1.85 m (6 ft 1 in)
- Position: Centre-back

Youth career
- 2003: Joseense
- 2003: Jalesense
- 2004–2005: Portuguesa

Senior career*
Years	Team	Apps	(Gls)
2003	Jalesense		
2005–2009	Portuguesa	66	(11)
2010–2012	Santos	51	(3)
2013–2016	Cruzeiro	94	(2)
2017	Grêmio	9	(0)
- * Club domestic league appearances and goals

Bruno Rodrigo Fenelon Palomo (born 12 April 1985), known as Bruno Rodrigo, is a Brazilian retired footballer who played as a centre-back.

== Career ==
=== Early career ===
Born in Andradina, São Paulo, Bruno Rodrigo played for Joseense and Jalesense, making his senior debut with the latter in the 2003 Campeonato Paulista Série B2 and achieving promotion as champions.

=== Portuguesa ===
In 2004, Bruno Rodrigo joined Portuguesa and returned to the youth setup. He made his first team debut on 13 June 2005, starting in a 3–2 Série B away loss to Gama.

Bruno Rodrigo scored his first professional goal on 29 March 2006, netting the opener in a 2–2 Campeonato Paulista away draw against Marília. He became a regular starter in the following year, as the club won the Campeonato Paulista Série A2, and helped the club gain promotion to the Série A at the end of the season.

Bruno Rodrigo made his top tier debut on 11 May 2008, starting and scoring Lusa's third in a 5–5 home draw against Figueirense.

=== Santos ===
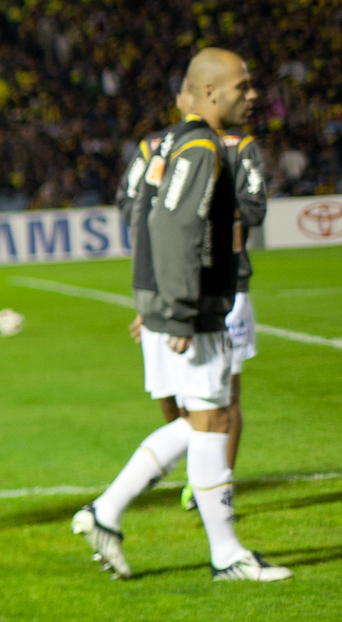
Bruno Rodrigo warming up with Santos in the first leg of the 2011 Copa Libertadores finals

On 22 December 2009, Santos reached an agreement with Portuguesa for the transfer of Bruno Rodrigo, acquiring 40% of his economic rights; he signed a three-year contract with his new club the following day. He spent his first season nursing two back injuries, and started to feature more regularly in 2011, also appearing in the first leg of the 2011 Copa Libertadores finals and in both matches of the club in the 2011 FIFA Club World Cup.

A backup to Edu Dracena and Durval, Bruno Rodrigo became a starter in July 2012, after Dracena suffered a knee injury, but left the club at the end of the year.

=== Cruzeiro ===
On 8 January 2013, Bruno Rodrigo signed a one-year deal with Cruzeiro. On 9 December, after being a regular starter during the year, he renewed his link until the end of 2016.

Bruno Rodrigo won two consecutive Série A titles with Cruzeiro, and only lost his starting spot in the 2015 season due to injuries. He left the club on 11 December 2016, having played in 166 matches and scored 17 goals.

=== Grêmio ===
On 8 March 2017, Bruno Rodrigo was announced at Grêmio until the end of the year, to cover for injured Pedro Geromel. He only played ten matches before leaving the club at the end of the year, and subsequently retired.

== Career statistics ==
Appearances and goals by club, season and competition
Club	Season	League			State League		Cup		Continental		Other		Total	
Club	Season	Division	Apps	Goals	Apps	Goals	Apps	Goals	Apps	Goals	Apps	Goals	Apps	Goals
Portuguesa	2005	Série B	2	0	0	0	—		—		—		2	0
Portuguesa	2006	Série B	16	2	6	1	—		—		—		22	3
Portuguesa	2007	Série B	33	4	21	3	2	0	—		—		56	7
Portuguesa	2008	Série A	35	2	10	2	5	0	—		—		50	4
Portuguesa	2009	Série B	31	5	18	1	2	1	—		—		51	7
Portuguesa	Total		117	13	55	7	9	1	—		—		181	21
Santos	2010	Série A	1	0	5	0	0	0	—		—		6	0
Santos	2011	Série A	17	0	7	0	—		1 (Note: Appearance(s) in Copa Libertadores)	0	2 (Note: Appearance(s) in FIFA Club World Cup)	0	27	0
Santos	2012	Série A	33	3	10	1	—		1	0	2 (Note: Appearance(s) in Recopa Sudamericana)	1	46	5
Santos	Total		51	3	22	1	0	0	2	0	4	1	79	5
Cruzeiro	2013	Série A	31	2	9	1	6	0	—		—		46	3
Cruzeiro	2014	Série A	11	0	10	2	3	0	9	4	—		33	6
Cruzeiro	2015	Série A	22	0	3	0	1	0	3	0	—		29	0
Cruzeiro	2016	Série A	30	1	10	2	10	3	—		1 (Note: Appearance(s) in Primeira Liga)	0	51	6
Cruzeiro	Total		94	3	32	5	20	3	12	4	1	0	159	15
Grêmio	2017	Série A	7	0	0	0	1	0	0	0	2	0	10	0
Career total			269	19	36	5	103	12	14	4	7	1	429	41

== Honours ==
Jalesense

- Campeonato Paulista Série B2: 2003

Portuguesa

- Campeonato Paulista Série A2: 2007

Santos

- Campeonato Paulista: 2010, 2011, 2012
- Copa do Brasil: 2010
- Copa Libertadores: 2011
- Recopa Sudamericana: 2012

Cruzeiro

- Campeonato Brasileiro Série A: 2013, 2014
- Campeonato Mineiro: 2014

Grêmio

- Copa Libertadores: 2017
