= Eurico (footballer, born 1984) =

Brazilian footballer

Personal information
- Full name: Eurico Alessandro Degaspari
- Date of birth: 23 September 1984 (age 42)
- Place of birth: Piracicaba, Brazil
- Height: 1.76 m (5 ft 9 in)
- Position: Left back

Team information
- Current team: Toledo

Youth career
- 2002: Ituano

Senior career*
Years	Team	Apps	(Gls)
2002–2006	Ituano		
2005	→ América–SP (loan)		
2006	Juventus–SC		
2007–2008	Engenheiro Beltrão		
2008–2011	Roma–PR		
2009	→ Engenheiro Beltrão (loan)	0	(0)
2010–2011	→ Marília (loan)	0	(0)
2011–2013	Toledo	0	(0)
2014	Brusque	0	(0)
2014	Novo Hamburgo	0	(0)
2014–2015	Maringá	6	(0)
2014	→ Inter de Lages (loan)	0	(0)
2015	Metropolitano	7	(0)
2016	Camboriú	0	(0)
2017–	Toledo	0	(0)
- * Club domestic league appearances and goals as of 24 January 2017

Eurico Alessandro Degaspari (born September 23, 1984 in Piracicaba), known as Eurico, is a Brazilian footballer who plays as left back for Toledo.

== Career statistics ==
As of 24 January 2017

Club	Season	League			State League		Cup		Conmebol		Other		Total	
Club	Season	Division	Apps	Goals	Apps	Goals	Apps	Goals	Apps	Goals	Apps	Goals	Apps	Goals
Marília	2010	Série C	—		5	0	—		—		—		5	0
Roma–PR	2011	Paranaense	—		20	0	—		—		—		20	0
Toledo	2012	Paranaense	—		21	0	—		—		—		21	0
Toledo	2013	Paranaense	—		21	1	—		—		—		21	1
Toledo	Subtotal		—		42	1	—		—		—		42	1
Brusque	2014	Catarinense	—		17	0	—		—		—		17	0
Maringá	2014	Série B	6	0	—		—		—		—		6	0
Maringá	2015	Paranaense	—		12	1	4	0	—		—		16	1
Maringá	Subtotal		6	0	12	1	4	0	—		—		22	1
Metropolitano	2015	Série D	7	0	—		—		—		—		7	0
Camboriú	2016	Catarinense	—		14	1	—		—		—		14	1
Career total			13	0	110	3	4	0	0	0	0	0	127	3
