= Neylor =

Brazilian footballer

Personal information
- Full name: Neylor Lopes Gonçalves
- Date of birth: April 2, 1987 (age 39)
- Place of birth: Colorado-PR, Brazil
- Height: 1.89 m (6 ft 2 in)
- Position: Central defender

Team information
- Current team: Boa

Youth career
- 2005–2007: Paranavaí

Senior career*
Years	Team	Apps	(Gls)
2006	→ Santos (Loan)		
2007	→ Atlético-PR (Loan)		
2008	Canoas		
2009	→ Ituiutaba (Loan)		
2010	Ituiutaba		
2011	Villa Nova		
2012–	Boa		
- * Club domestic league appearances and goals

Neylor Lopes Gonçalves or simply Neylor (born April 2, 1987 in Colorado-PR), is a Brazilian central defender who currently plays for Boa Esporte Clube.

== Contract ==
- 27 February 2007 to 26 February 2010
