= Emilio Zeballos =

Uruguayan footballer (born 1992)

Personal information
- Full name: Emilio Enrique Zeballos Gutiérrez
- Date of birth: August 5, 1992 (age 34)
- Place of birth: Montevideo, Uruguay
- Height: 1.85 m (6 ft 1 in)
- Position: Right back

Youth career
- –2012: Defensor

Senior career*
Years	Team	Apps	(Gls)
2012–2018	Defensor	108	(3)
2017	→ Chapecoense (loan)	4	(0)
2018–2019	Progreso	30	(2)
2020	Defensor	20	(0)
2021–2023	Plaza Colonia	43	(4)
- * Club domestic league appearances and goals as of 4 September 2024

Emilio Enrique Zeballos Gutiérrez (born August 5, 1992) is a Uruguayan footballer who played as a right back.

== Career ==
He made his professional debut on August 25, 2012, at Estadio Luis Franzini, played as a starter against Nacional and tied 2 to 2. On October 14, he scored his first professional goal was against Racing and thanks to his goal won the game Defensor was second in the Apertura tournament, behind Peñarol.

Internationally, he debuted on January 24, 2013, against Olimpia classification to the group stage of the Copa Libertadores, tied 0–0 but lost the return leg 2–0.

In the Clausura tournament, Emilio maintained ownership. Defensor finished first in the tournament, this time chickadees were in second place.

Final Peñarol and Defensor forced to determine the champion Uruguay, was played on June 4 at the Estadio Centenario, but lost 3–1 with a hat-trick from Antonio Pacheco.

Zeballos finished the 2012–13 season with 32 games played 90 minutes each, about 33 Defensor Sporting played.

The 2013–14 season was irregular for Emilio, since although every game he played the full 90 minutes played, was present in 24 of the 42 meetings which took Defensor Sporting, alternated the position with Pablo Pintos and Ramón Arias. That season he achieved third place in the 2014 Copa Libertadores, competition in which he scored his first international goal on March 21 against Cruzeiro in Brazil. Locally made no goals, Defensor ended the tournament Apertura and Clausura 12th place ninth.

He started the 2014 Apertura tournament without being summoned, drew 0–0 against Nacional on the first date. And for the next date, he played as a starter and ended the Apertura playing 10 of 15 games, Defensor finished sixth. Torneo Clausura for 2015 was undisputed starter, as he played 15 matches the corresponding 90 minutes each scored a goal on February 22, 2015, in the win over Rentistas 6–2, finished fourth. At the annual table, were the fifth so they qualified for the 2015 Copa Sudamericana.

He played his 100th game for Uruguayan club Defensor on November 20, he faced El Tanque Sisley and he played 90 minutes and the score drew 2–2.

== Honours ==
Chapecoense

- Campeonato Catarinense: 2017
