= Manoel (footballer, born 1990) =

Brazilian footballer

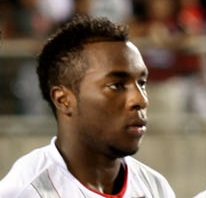
- Manoel in 2011

Personal information
- Full name: Manoel Messias Silva Carvalho
- Date of birth: 26 February 1990 (age 36)
- Place of birth: Bacabal, Brazil
- Height: 1.81 m (5 ft 11 in)
- Position: Centre back

Team information
- Current team: América Mineiro
- Number: 26

Youth career
- 2005–2006: Nacional-PR
- 2006–2009: Atlético Paranaense

Senior career*
Years	Team	Apps	(Gls)
2009–2014	Atlético Paranaense	195	(11)
2014–2021	Cruzeiro	144	(11)
2019	→ Corinthians (loan)	42	(3)
2020	→ Trabzonspor (loan)	0	(0)
2021–2025	Fluminense	92	(6)
2026–	América Mineiro	9	(0)
- * Club domestic league appearances and goals as of 18 November 2026

Manoel Messias Silva Carvalho (born 26 February 1990), simply known as Manoel, is a Brazilian professional footballer who plays as a central defender for América Mineiro.

== Honours ==
Atlético Paranaense

- Campeonato Paranaense: 2009

Cruzeiro

- Campeonato Brasileiro Série A: 2014

Corinthians

- Campeonato Paulista: 2019

Trabzonspor

- Turkish Cup: 2019–20

Fluminense

- Taça Guanabara: 2022, 2023
- Campeonato Carioca: 2022, 2023
- Copa Libertadores: 2023

Individual

- Campeonato Brasileiro Série A Team of the Year: 2013
