= Breno Lopes (footballer, born 1990) =

Brazilian footballer

Personal information
- Full name: Breno Gonçalves Lopes
- Date of birth: 28 September 1990 (age 36)
- Place of birth: Itacarambi, Brazil
- Height: 1.81 m (5 ft 11 in)
- Position: Left-back

Team information
- Current team: Ituano

Youth career
- Brasília

Senior career*
Years	Team	Apps	(Gls)
2010–2013	Brasília	15	(0)
2012	→ Ceilândia (loan)		
2014	Paraná	35	(0)
2014–2019	Cruzeiro	1	(0)
2015	→ Fluminense (loan)	7	(0)
2016	→ Red Bull Brasil (loan)	12	(1)
2016–2017	→ Ponte Preta (loan)	6	(0)
2017	→ Atlético Goianiense (loan)	20	(0)
2018	→ Red Bull Brasil (loan)	14	(0)
2020–	Ituano	40	(1)
- * Club domestic league appearances and goals as of 17 January 2021

Breno Gonçalves Lopes (born 28 September 1990), known as Breno Lopes, is a Brazilian professional footballer who plays as a left-back for Ituano.

== Honours ==
Cruzeiro

- Campeonato Brasileiro Série A: 2014
