= Gilvan Tavares =

Brazilian former lawyer

President for Cruzeiro EC
- In office December 2011 – 2014

Personal details
- Born: January 22, 1940 (age 86) Sabinópolis, Brazil
- Occupation: Lawyer

Gilvan de Pinho Tavares (January 22, 1940) is a Brazilian former lawyer. He was ex-president of the association football team Cruzeiro EC.

== Early life ==
Tavares was born in Sabinópolis, Brazil, and is the son of Agenor de Pinho Tavares and Maria Flor de Maio Pimenta Barroso.

== Career ==
He became president in December 2011 for the 2012–2014 triennium. Gilvan played for Cruzeiro in the youth category during 1956.

As president, Tavares affected a few cases in Cruzeiro, involving Walter Montillo with other Brazilian teams, specially Corinthians and São Paulo FC.
