= Melão =

Multi-use stadium in Varginha, Brazil

Coordinates: 21°34′12″S 45°24′51″W

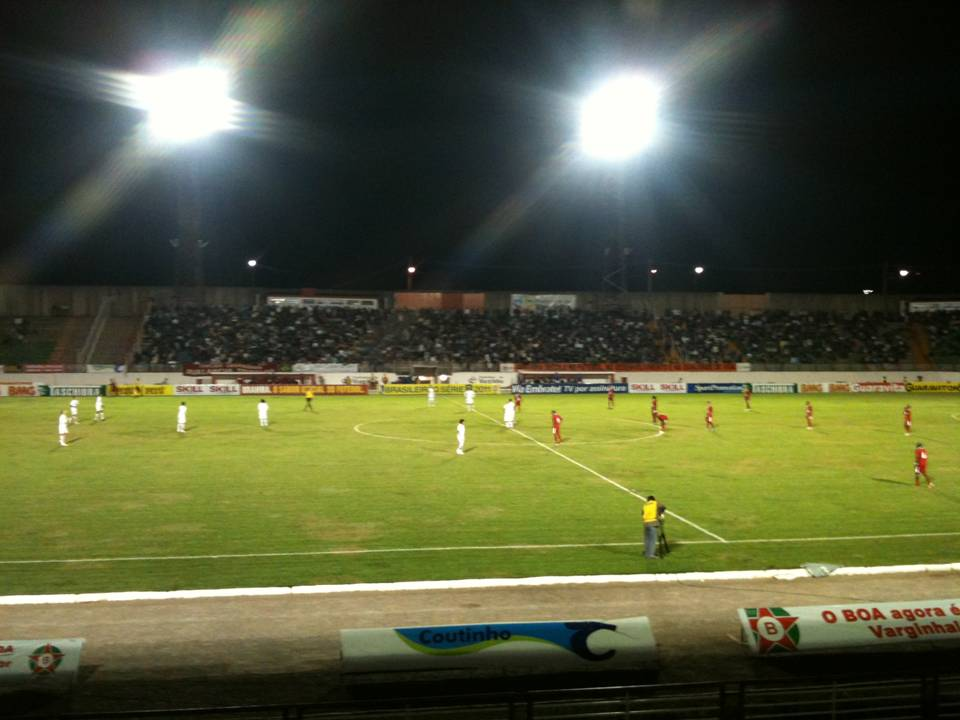
- Sisbrace
- Interactive map of Melão
- Full name: Estádio Municipal Prefeito Dilson Luiz de Melo
- Location: Varginha, MG, Brazil
- Owner: Town Hall of Varginha
- Capacity: 15,471

Construction
- Opened: October 7, 1988

Tenant
- Boa Esporte Clube

Estádio Municipal Prefeito Dilson Luiz de Melo, usually known as Melão is a Brazilian multi-use stadium in Varginha, Minas Gerais. It is currently used mostly for football matches. The stadium holds 15,471 people. It was built in 1988. The stadium is owned by the Town Hall of Varginha, and its formal name honors Dilson Luiz de Melo, who was Varginha's mayor during the stadium construction.

== History ==
The inaugural match was played on October 7, 1988, when Atlético Mineiro beat Flamengo of Varginha 1–0. The first goal of the stadium was scored by Atlético Mineiro's Renato.

On October 10, 1991, the first ever Brazil national team match was played in Varginha city. The match, which was against the Yugoslavia national football team, and set the return of Carlos Alberto Parreira as the manager of the Seleção, ended 3–1 to Brazil. The Brazilian goals were scored by Luís Henrique, Müller and Raí.

The stadium's attendance record currently stands at 19,900 people, set on March 12, 1989, when Flamengo of Varginha beat Atlético Mineiro 1–0.
