= Tombos =

Tombos, Minas Gerais
- Municipality
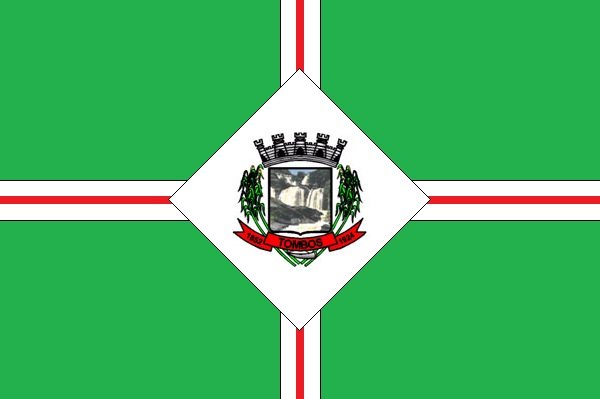
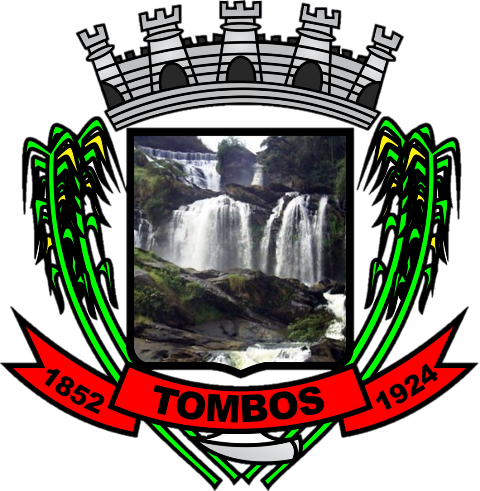
- Flag Coat of arms

- Tombos within Minas Gerais
- Coordinates: 21°08′S 42°22′W

Government
  - Mayor: Ivan Carlos de Andrade

Area
  - Total: 283.483 km^{2} (109.453 sq mi)

Population (2020)
  - Total: 7,850
- Time zone: UTC−3 (BRT)
- Website: www.prefeituratombos.mg.gov.br

Tombos is a municipality in southeast Minas Gerais state, Brazil. It is located in the Zona da Mata region and its population was approximately 7,850 inhabitants in 2020 (IBGE).

== See also ==
- List of municipalities in Minas Gerais
