= 2012 CR Vasco da Gama season =

Vasco da Gama
2012 season
- President: Roberto Dinamite
- Manager: Daniel Freitas
- Head Coach: Cristóvão Borges (until 10 September); Marcelo Oliveira (since 12 September until 4 November); Gaúcho (since 4 November)
- Brasileirão Série A: 5th place
- Copa Libertadores: Quarterfinal
- Rio de Janeiro State Championship: Runner-up (Taça Guanabara); Runner-up (Taça Rio); 4th place (Overall)
- Top goalscorer: League: Alecsandro (10); All: Alecsandro (25)
- Highest home attendance: 21,247 (vs. Barcelona de Guayaquil, an Edmundo's friendly)
- Lowest home attendance: 1,996 (vs. Palmeiras, for Brazilian Série A)
Home colours	Away colours	Third colours

The 2012 season was Club de Regatas Vasco da Gama's 114th year in existence, the club's 97th season in existence of football, and the club's 41st season playing in the Brasileirão Série A, the top flight of Brazilian football. The 2008 season was the only season where the team was down graded resulting in their playing in the Brasileirão Série B in the 2009 season.

After doing well in the 2011 season, Vasco da Gama aimed to win its 5th title of the Brasileirão Série A. The team came close to achieving this in 2011, but lost to the Corinthians. As well as competing in the series A, Vasco da Gama returned to the Copa Libertadores (the main football competition of the Americas). In the eleven years after the 2001 Copa Libertadores, the team had enjoyed 8 consecutive wins which was a record, before being eliminated by Boca Juniors, the 2001 finalists. Despite doing so well, Vasco da Gama could not defend the title of champion of Copa do Brasil, because of conflicting schedules. (A Brazilian team competing in the Copa Libertadores cannot compete in the Copa do Brasil but this is planned for reconsideration for the 2013 Copa do Brasil).

== Season overview ==
=== Pre-season ===
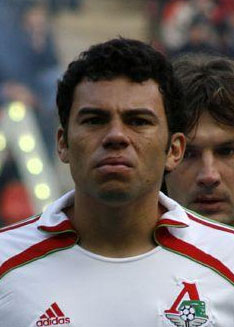
Rodolfo was the first building of Vasco da Gama presented for the 2012 season

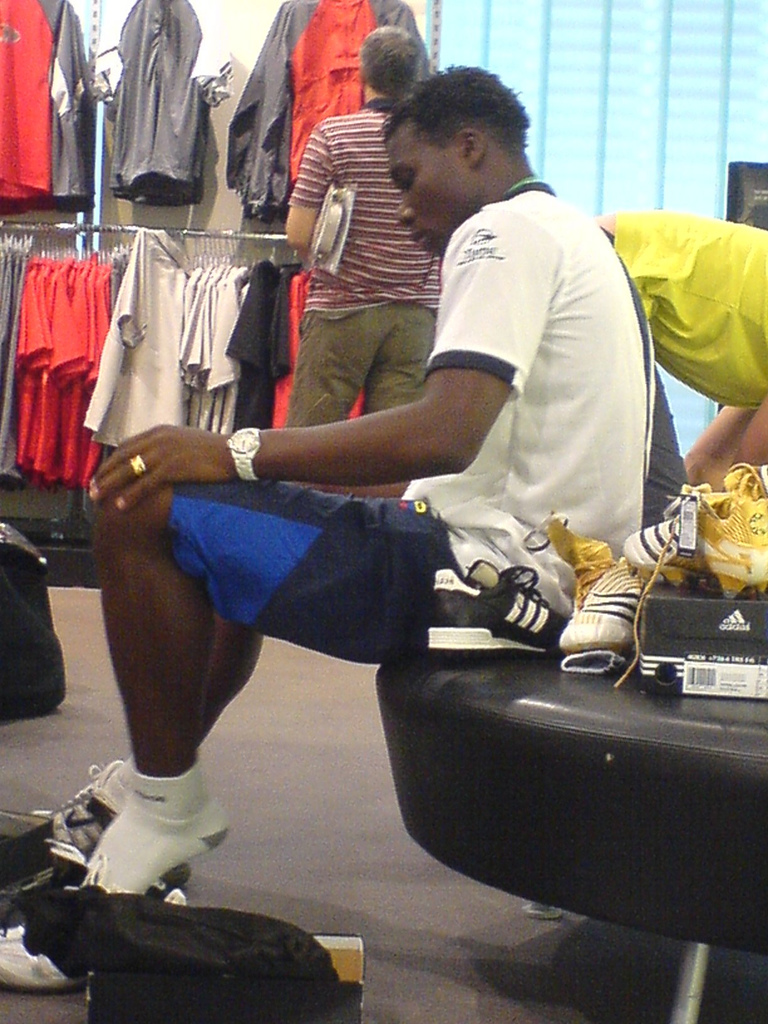
Carlos Tenorio was the main building of Vasco da Gama for the 2012 season

Vasco da Gama, unlike some other Brazilian clubs, decided to keep its main lineup of the 2011 season for 2012. Top players, like Dedé, Rômulo, Felipe, Juninho Pernambucano and Bernardo, were kept on, at least for the Copa Libertadores competition, which only takes up the first half of the season. Despite this, there are other players who may play for Vasco da Gama in the 2012 season. Some of them are: the centre backs Réver, of Atlético Mineiro, Rodolfo, from Grêmio (on loan from Lokomotiv Moscow), Miranda, from Atlético Madrid, and Leandro Almeida, from Dynamo Kyiv, the left backs Maxwell, from Barcelona, and Kléber, from Internacional, the Argentine attacking midfielder Walter Montillo, from Cruzeiro, the Chilean second striker Eduardo Vargas, from Universidad de Chile, the Colombian second striker Jonathan Copete, from Santa Fe, and the strikers Diego Tardelli, from Anzhi Makhachkala, and the Argentine Facundo Parra, from Independiente. Another possibility would be the return, by loan from Al-Jaish, of the central back Anderson Martins. But despite his wishes to return, he stated that could not because of his contract. Moreover, he had not yet made his debut for his new club, as it had not registered for the Qatar Stars League.

=== Players leaving the team ===
Vasco da Gama announced several outputs: on 8 December, announced the contract rescission of the Paraguayan full back Julio Irrazábal. On 9 December, announced the free transfer of the central back Gian Mariano (which was loaned to Avaí) to Ponte Preta. On 11 December, the contract rescission of the central back Jadson Viera, who was on loan to the Nacional (Montevideo) (coincidentally, the chief opponent of the Vasco da Gama in the group stage of the Copa Libertadores), was signed. On 13 December, announced the loan of the second striker Rodrigo Pimpão (which was loaned to Omiya Ardija) and the attacking midfielder Enrico (which was loaned to Ceará) to Ponte Preta. Also on 13 December, was announced the transfer of the striker Élton to Corinthians. On 2 January, was announced the loan of the playmaker Jéferson for three seasons to Bahia, by winning a dispute with the Náutico. On 4 January, Vasco da Gama announced the contract rescission of the striker Patrick. On 7 January, Vasco da Gama announced the loan of the left back Márcio Careca to Mirassol. On 20 January, Vasco da Gama lost the multipurpose Jumar. Jumar was traded to the Guangzhou R&F.

=== Transfers ===
Vasco da Gama commenced their summer transfer activity on 3 January, signing the central back Rodolfo, after several negotiations with Lokomotiv Moscow, on a free transfer. Rodolfo has presented at the club in the same day. Also on 3 January, the attacking midfielder Bernardo (who was loaned to Vasco da Gama since the 2011 season), has signed a new contract, this time of purchase. Bernardo signed for three seasons in a transfer reported to be worth €1,45 million. On 4 January, the left-back Thiago Feltri sign contract for three seasons from Atlético Goianiense on a free transfer, after Feltri would be approved in the medical examinations on 27 December. On 10 January, Vasco da Gama hit with Argentine midfielder Matías Abelairas. Abelairas came six months after being away from the fields, long after passing by the River Plate, where it was revealed. On 14 January, Vasco da Gama hit the signing of Ecuatorian striker Carlos Tenorio. Tenorio was presented by the current club president Roberto Dinamite, who was also a striker, like Tenorio. Tenorio comes after passage through the Middle East, where he played for Al-Nasr and the Al-Sadd (in the latter, he played along with the playmaker Felipe).

Despite this back-and-coming players, the biggest change, so far, was in the club management: the departure of Rodrigo Caetano, director of football, which was doing a great and victorious job in the club since 2009. Many names are speculative, but the favorite of the management is Marco Aurélio Cunha, currently alderman of São Paulo and former director of football of São Paulo. Furthermore, Cunha has a great relationship with coach Ricardo Gomes, which would facilitate his coming. After many days with uncertainties and negotiations with various names like Newton Drummond (who refused the proposal) and Ocimar Bolicenho (who suffered rejection by the Vasco da Gama fans), finally announced the new director of football: Daniel Freitas (known as the "right-hand man" by Rodrigo Caetano) was presented on 5 January, along with Thiago Feltri.

=== January ===
Vasco da Gama debuted in the state championship by defeating Americano: 2–0. With some subjects, such as Fernando Prass, Dedé, Juninho Pernambucano and Diego Souza, gave only two new faces among the Starting XI: Thiago Feltri, debuting in Vasco da Gama, and Leandro Chaparro, who for the first time in Vasco da Gama, begins a game as a starter. Even with all playing well, the highlight was Fagner. In the first goal, he crossed to Alecsandro score. And he did the second, after beautiful assist from Dedé. The highlight negative was Jonathan. Jonathan, who replaced Leandro Chaparro in the second half, was sent off after a scuffle with Mário Loyola. On 25 January, Vasco da Gama announced the out of the central back Víctor Ramos. Víctor Ramos, player belonging to Standard Liège, was loaning to Vitória. In the second round, in the debut of Rodolfo, Vasco da Gama won Duque de Caxias, 3–1. Juninho Pernambucano opened the scoring on a beautiful long shot. Gilcimar tied up, but Alecsandro, after corner kick from Juninho Pernambucano, and Diego Souza, after crossing from Fagner, finished the scoring. Not a very strong rain that hit Macaé during the game stopped the good work of Vasco da Gama. On 31 January, Vasco da Gama announced the loan of the goalkeeper Tiago to Grêmio Barueri.

=== February ===
Under intense pressure, Vasco da Gama beat Bangu with a final score of 3–1; Alecsandro, in a penalty kick, opened with the game's first goal. However, the game was paused for ten minutes after confusion arose between the fans and police; an explosion of tear gas occurred and everyone in the stadium was affected. Following the break, a tie was secured by Bangu after Tiano converted a penalty. Thiago Feltri and Bernardo then converted a free kick to regain the lead and secure eventual victory for their club.

In the fourth round, Vasco da Gama beat Friburguense with a score of 2–0. The game marked the debut of the third uniform design for the season: a blue uniform, in reference to the maritime staff origins of the club. Diego Souza was the highlight of the match, scoring two goals, assisted by Juninho Pernambucano and Felipe, respectively.

Considerable expectation surrounded the return of the Vasco da Gama club to the Copa Libertadores. However, the club was unable to emerge victorious, with observers citing nervousness, a lack of luck and unusual errors for the 2–1 defeat at São Januário to Nacional. The Nacional opened the scoring on a corner kick move. At first, the goal was given to Andrés Scotti, but then was marked own goal by Dedé. In the second half, on the first pitch, Vicente Sánchez opened 2–0. Alecsandro decreased the score (2-1), and Vasco da Gama drew a reaction, that included a goal from Carlos Tenorio (but that was canceled as well), but it was.

The defeat of Vasco da Gama to the Nacional was considered overwhelming and contributed to a discussion about the level of Brazilian football at the time, which had been initiated following games like Flamengo vs. Universidad de Chile (0-4), and Santos vs. Barcelona (0-4).

In a game on 12 February 2012, Vasco da Gama defeated the Fluminense Football Club, 2–1, in the Clássico dos Gigantes ("Giants derby"). Fluminense gained the lead position due to a goal from Thiago Neves, but Alecsandro, with two opportunistic goals, secured eventual victory for the Vasco da Gama club. However, the performances during the match was overshadowed by the Brazilian media's focus upon the perceived poor performance of referee, Antonio Schneider.

In a postponed game (15 February), Vasco da Gama won the Volta Redonda 3–0 at São Januário. Alecsandro, assisted by Fellipe Bastos scored the first. Wiliam Barbio, assisted by Alecsandro, scored the second and his first goal for Vasco da Gama. And Alecsandro, in penalty suffered by Thiago Feltri, closed the scoring. All this in just the first time. But, during this game, the news fell like a bombshell in the club: Bernardo, darling of the crowd, opened in a day, a lawsuit against the club, asking for the termination of his contract, on behalf of non-payment of your FGTS (Fundo de Garantia por Tempo de Serviço). The crowd, heard the news, booed Bernardo when it was replaced by Jonathan. Bernardo, in response, applauded (ironically) and made a gesture telling the crowd to shut up. The situation of Bernardo will be resolved only after the Carnival.

On 18 February, Vasco da Gama beat Boavista 1–0. Vasco da Gama took the field already qualified and guaranteed first place. Still, the team, most of them reserves, with a goal by Kim, guaranteed perfect recovery in the first phase of the Taça Guanabara. On 22 February, in Clássico dos Milhões (the Millions Classic), Vasco da Gama beat Flamengo, in his signature style (turning), for 2–1. Flamengo took the lead with Vágner Love, after a bid with Ronaldinho and Deivid. But Vasco da Gama drew with Alecsandro, after a kick by Juninho Pernambucano and rebound granted by Felipe. In the first half, the game had various chances for both sides, and a missed goal by Deivid. In the second half, the teams got tired and slowed down. But the Vasco da Gama persisted and succeeded: after a cross from Kim, Fagner headed. Felipe rebound again and Diego Souza added to give final numbers to the game that has had a confusion between Willians and Fellipe Bastos. The performance of the team of Vasco da Gama, especially Juninho Pernambucano and Dedé, and the poor performances of Ronaldinho and Felipe, both of the Flamengo, were overshadowed by the bid of Deivid, who won worldwide repercussions.

On 26 February, Vasco da Gama reached the final with a perfect recovery. But everything went downhill. The team went unrecognized and lost to Fluminense, 3–1. The game got exciting with bids for both sides and some refereeing errors by Marcelo Henrique de Lima. Until Fagner d'fouls inside the area in Wellington Nem. Penalty marked and converted by Fred. The second goal came on a brilliant move: Deco saw the position of Fernando Prass (who was preparing to cross, like the other players who were in the area) and sent directly to the goal, opening 2–0. In the second half, Vasco da Gama was to attack, in despair, including Dedé, like a striker. Thus, spaces were left and the counter-attack came Fluminense: Fred, after pass from Thiago Neves, made 3–0. After that, the game became a defensive attack. And Vasco da Gama was able to decrease: crossing by Fagner, butt from Eduardo Costa: 3-1 and a glimmer of hope to Vasco da Gama. But there was not time and Fluminense were crowned champion of the 2012 Taça Guanabara.

On 29 February, Vasco da Gama disappointed in his debut in Taça Rio. After open 2–0, with Alecsandro and Felipe (on a beautiful play with Juninho Pernambucano), gave the tie to the Bonsucesso in São Januário. The surprising draw and the bad performance was explained by the defeat of the team in Taça Guanabara Final, which rocked the group.

=== March ===
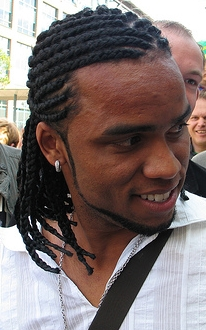
Carlos Alberto returned to training with the first-squad in this month

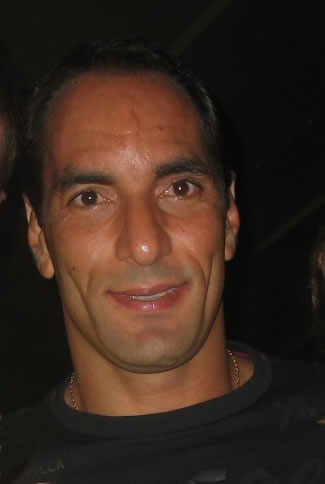
Edmundo said goodbye to football in a friendly against Barcelona de Guayaquil

The dispute of Bernardo with Vasco da Gama over. Sorry and have with the debts paid, Bernardo, along with his agent and his lawyer, will take action against the club. Bernardo, unlike Carlos Alberto (who trains at the club separately for a bad relationship with Roberto Dinamite since early 2011), will rejoin the squad.

On 3 March, Vasco da Gama, with an almost full-time reserve (the owners, only Fernando Prass served) won Olaria by 2–0. The situation was defined as the first time: Carlos Tenorio, after pass Felipe, made the first; Éder Luís, after crossing the young Dieyson, concluded with enough cold to give final numbers to match. The bad news was on account of Carlos Tenorio: the striker, in the second time in a cross, tore the Achilles tendon and had to have surgery the day after the game (4 January). Tenorio will have to stay away for six months and is out of the Libertadores' squad.

On 5 March, Vasco da Gama landed with centre back Fabrício, who last season played for Atlético Paranaense.

On 6 March, Vasco da Gama got his first victory in the Libertadores: 3–2 in Alianza Lima. Dominating the action throughout the match, Vasco da Gama could get away with a quiet victory. But it turned out well. An unpretentious big kick became a launching pad for Sebastián Charquero, who, after failure of Rodolfo, came face to face with Fernando Prass, silent São Januário and doing 1–0. The team, unlike the game against Nacional, not felt the blow and kept pushing. And after the launch of Diego Souza, Wiliam Barbio was left alone with the goalkeeper. He pass looking for Alecsandro, but before that, Christian Ramos arrived and ended up doing against. The turning point came in the second half: Fagner in a corner, crossed, and Dedé, quite technical, headed to the back of the net, making 2–1. The Vasco da Gama has increased: after dubious penalty marked, Juninho Pernambucano was for the recovery and did. The Alianza Lima still scared, doing 3–2 with Walter Ibáñez. But it did not pass. The main character of the match was eventually Alecsandro: striker missed two penalties when the game was 1-1 (causing the expulsion of Giancarlo Carmona) and 2–1. For this reason, it ended up being unable to beat the third penalty by Felipe and Juninho Pernambucano.

In the press conference surprise, on 8 March, Vasco da Gama announced the hiring of a new CEO: Franklin Assunção. The new "enhanced" Vasco arrived surrounded by many misgivings. In his presentation, Assunção had planned to make a speech. But ended up not doing and looking nervously at the press conference. Assunção appeared saying that he had worked in clubs lesser extent, as the Swiss Chiasso and the Italian Ascoli, which would have been contradicted by the current leaders of the clubs mentioned.

On 11 March, Vasco da Gama won with authority Madureira: 3–0. Play with the little public and low technical quality, was resolved in the second half: Juninho Pernambucano, Fellipe Bastos and Allan tried to leave the small crowd in the stadium happy.

On 14 March, Vasco da Gama draw, in Estadio Dr. Nicolás Léoz, in Asunción, with Libertad: 1-1. Vasco da Gama dominated the first half and made 1–0 with Diego Souza in the header after a cross by Fagner. In the second half, the game, which was already tense, won the air war: Diego Souza took unfair Ismael Benegas entry (which caused him a mark on the left calf), and the judge just gave the foul. In the next move, Diego Souza retaliated with an elbow, and sent off. The move caused a general confusion, which caused a yellow card for Wiliam Barbio and Sergio Aquino. At the exit to the locker room, Diego Souza had a bottle thrown in his direction. Diego Souza "pushed" the 4th referee and threw the bottle back to the fans of Libertad, hitting two fans. After the confusion, the Vasco da Gama began to have three difficulties: playing a man down, the violence of the Libertad players and passivity of arbitration commanded by the Chilean Enrique Osses in this regard. And the draw of the Libertad came: after pinball, the ball fell to José Ariel Núñez, who scored the goal that defined the game. But while the game is not over, the battle continued: Allan received a yellow card, possibly haven't been allowed into the place of Renato Silva. In a similar bid, which occurred prior to the side of Libertad, the judge didn't impose a yellow card for Pablo Velázquez, which came even before leaving Rodolfo Gamarra. José Ariel Nunez, after missing violent on Rodolfo, and received a second yellow card, and hence the red card. Miguel Samudio (who had previously discussed with Nílton) beat Fagner, giving you a fuller in the belly. The referee Enrique Osses chafed at the Brazilian and sent up. The game ended, but the war climate, no. On the way back to Rio de Janeiro, in the Aeroporto Internacional do Galeão, Fernando Prass, Felipe and Diego Souza complained about the hostile treatment of Libertad and their fans and incompetence of the arbitration led by Enrique Osses. But the worst would come: Dedé and Renato Silva complained of racism: the fans have imitated and called the central defense duo of "macacos". The case of racism caused a national task force, and, supported by athletes as Neymar, a campaign began for the team playing against Libertad in São Januário with the third kit of the 2011 season, where the shirt commemorating the historic 1923 team (known as the "Camisas Negras" (the Blackshirts)) that overthrew racism in Brazilian football.

On 16 March, despite all the debts paid off, the loan of Bernardo for the Santos was announced. The case had caused discomfort for the fans and the entire club, which would cost a lot to take him back after he attitude committed. Bernardo was loaned to the end of the year for the Santos (Bernardo has a contract with Vasco da Gama until the end of 2015).

On 18 March, aiming at the game against Libertad, Vasco da Gama saved players in the Clássico da Amizade (the "Friendship Derby"), against Botafogo, and paid dearly for it: lost by 3–1. After failure of the defense, Fellype Gabriel opened 2–0 in the first time. In the second half, Fellipe Bastos, in a beautiful free kick, declined. But Fellype Gabriel, inspired, made another, signed a hat-trick and confirmed the victory of Botafogo.

On 21 March, Vasco da Gama received the Libertad and won, 2–0. Before the game begins, the crowd did a wonderful party to show their indignation with respect to the case of racism in the previous week by supporters of Libertad. When the ball starts rolling, the Vasco da Gama is a boom's team Libertad. The team from Rio de Janeiro was about 70% of ball possession, but turned into opportunities, which made the crowd anxious and nervous (even because of Libertad tues docked some counter-attacks and power to be winners). In return for the second time, two substitutions changed the landscape of departure: Juninho Pernambucano and Allan entered in place of Eduardo Costa and Éder Luís, respectively. And before long the two who entered the show that came: Juninho Pernambucano charged corner, the defense temporarily removed, and Juninho Pernambucano, with almost no angle, kicked into the goal, surprising the goalkeeper Rodrigo Muñoz and scoring a beautiful goal, attesting to its great quality technique. Minutes later, Allan made beautiful play by the right and crossed low to Alecsandro, free and do, with easily, 2–0 on the scoreboard. The answer turned out to be discrimination on the pitch, playing a beautiful football and leaving the crowd satisfied with what he saw.

On 25 March, was agreed to reinstate of Carlos Alberto to the first squad. Carlos Alberto had been training separated from the first squad, along with Bruno Paulo and Renato Augusto. The highest salary he receives, in addition to having good technical quality and output of Bernardo to Santos contributed for his return. On the same day, Vasco da Gama only drew with Resende, 1-1, in São Januário. In days of tributes to Chico Anysio (Brazilian comedian who died on 23 March, who was a Vasco da Gama fan), Resende opened the scoring with Elias, after pass from Marcelo Régis. Alecsandro (who had earlier missed a penalty), tied, head, after a cross from Allan.

On 28 March, the emotion took over in São Januário: Edmundo said farewell to the football. São Januário received so far, the largest crowd of the season (21,247) to bid farewell to one of his greatest idols. And the party was even bigger with the rout imposed: 9–1 on the reserve team of Barcelona de Guayaquil, in a rematch of the final of the Copa Libertadores 1998. Edmundo, a penalty kick, opened the scoring, and even made the third goal, in a play with Fagner and immortalizing the "rolling" (celebrating the fourth goal against Flamengo in a 4–1 in 1997 Brazilian Série A Semifinal). Alecsandro made it two involving Edmundo and Éder Luís. Nicolás Asencio, made the score 3–1. But after that, only gave Vasco da Gama: Juninho Pernambucano made the fourth goal before the end of the first time. In the second half, Éder Luís, heel, made the fifth; Fellipe Bastos, in a free kick, after the goalkeeper Washington Vera failed; made the sixth, Allan, after table with Fellipe Bastos, made the seventh; eighth goal, Diego Souza did; Edmundo, replaced by Wiliam Barbio in 86 minutes, was dismissed from the football. But still had time for one more: in all rehearsed, Allan made his second goal and gave final numbers to the game: 9–1.

On 31 March, Vasco da Gama thrashed the Macaé, away: 4–1. The first was Diego Souza, after pass from Alecsandro. Then it was Diego Souza who gave the pass for Juninho Pernambucano enlarge. Pipico, after a cross from André Gomes, declined. But Éder Luís and Juninho Pernambucano, in two beautiful goals, gave the final numbers in the match in Macaé.

=== April ===
On 3 April, Vasco da Gama beat Alianza Lima at Alejandro Villanueva in Lima: 2–1. In a balanced game, Fellipe Bastos made the difference. In the first goal, Fellipe Bastos dribbled Edgar González and kicked the ball: the ball slipped in Giancarlo Carmona and ended up covering Salomón Libman, entering angle. Beautiful goal. But Fellipe Bastos scored a goal even more beautiful: Éder Luís, on the right, rolled to Fellipe Bastos make a placed and powerful kick, making a great goal: 2–0. The game, which apparently was quiet, gained an air of tension. Renato Silva, Felipe and Dedé stages a scenes worthy of slapstick, and the ball fell to Miguel Curiel, who did 2-1 and set fire to the game. In the last move of the match, Nílton split with a super strong in Giancarlo Carmona and was sent off in a move that angered both the players (who were upwards of Nílton), and the fans of Alianza Lima (which began to hit it towards objects in Vasco da Gama players).

On 7 April, in the second Clássico dos Milhões in this season, Vasco da Gama, shorn of many of its key players, lost 2–1 to Flamengo. Vágner Love, after bid claim that there was a lack in Rodolfo, and ended up kicked, getting Fernando Prass by surprise, you just hitting the feet of Deivid, who opened the scoring. In the second half, Vasco da Gama equalized: Alecsandro kicked, the ball away, Welinton, Felipe and Marcos González staged a slapstick scene, leaving the ball into the area for Diego Souza draw the game. At the last minute, Fernando Prass committed penalty in Leonardo Moura. Ronaldinho hit and converts: 2–1. After the game, players, managers and coaches of Vasco da Gama departed upward from the referee Wagner dos Santos Rosa, before his bad and biased performance, and had to be restrained by the Military Police and the GEPE (Grupamento Especial de Policiamento em Estádios), both present. After the game, players such as Rodolfo, Eduardo Costa, Diego Souza, Fagner and Fellipe Bastos, and leaders such as Roberto Dinamite and Daniel Freitas did harsh criticism of arbitration, which was defended by Jorge Rabello (chairman of the FERJ Arbitration Commission).

On 9 April, it was speculated in the European press that Vasco da Gama was almost closed with the Romanian forward Adrian Mutu, of Cesena. Moreover, in talks with the Italian strikers Vincenzo Iaquinta, also of Cesena, and Marco Borriello, from Juventus (on loan from Roma). The news was that Franklin Assunção was in Italy persuading the Romanian player to go to Vasco da Gama, at the end of the season. But on 11 April, news arrived: Franklin Assunção would be waived so the return trip. The justification was that assumption would not have come with an international sponsorship of high value, as promised, and that still would not have authority to negotiate players for Vasco da Gama. But then it was said that Assunção would not be excused. But there is dissatisfaction with their work, there.

On 12 April, Vasco da Gama closed his campaign in the group stage of the Copa Libertadores with a flourish, winning Nacional at Gran Parque Central in Montevideo, by 1–0. Vasco da Gama, before the game was already qualified for round of 16, as well as the Libertad, but it was what was best to try to secure first place; unlike this, Nacional was a mixed as the team was eliminated from the competition. The game was good, with attacks on both sides, but with a certain area of Vasco da Gama. Until the goal came on a counterattack: Alecsandro pass for Diego Souza, who kicked; Jorge Bava managed to defend, but Diego Souza grabbed the rebound and scored the goal of the match. The party of the Nacional crowd was the highlight of the match: despite the elimination confirmed one week before and lost the last game, the crowd made the party, singing, jumping, letting off fireworks, among others. Despite the victory, Vasco da Gama ended up in second place, behind the Libertad (that simultaneously beat Alianza Lima 2–1, in Alejandro Villanueva in Lima) in a goals for rule.

On 15 April, Vasco da Gama won Nova Iguaçu in Moça Bonita by 3-1 and qualified for the Taça Rio semifinal. Rômulo opened the scoring. Zambi, in a penalty kick, draw. But Alecsandro, twice at the end of each half, gave final numbers to the score. The match marked the return of Carlos Alberto, who, despite lack of match fitness, he served well and came close to scoring his goal.

On 21 April, Vasco da Gama announced officially the forward Pipico, who was in Macaé. Pipico was standing out in the Fluminense football for 3 to 5 years, since he was in Cabofriense and, posteriorly, Bangu, and finally was hired by a "big team".

On 22 April, Vasco da Gama beat Flamengo by 3–2, for Taça Rio semifinal. Vágner Love, after beautiful play with Kléberson, opened the scoring. But the Vasco da Gama reversed the score. In the first goal, Felipe kicked out of the area, and Éder Luís did, on the rebound countered by Felipe. In the second goal, Felipe gave a nice dribble in Luiz Antônio, and kicked to goal. In the second half, Felipe committed penalty in Alecsandro. Felipe hit and made the third. Kléberson on a beautiful shot from outside the area, the score decreased, but to no avail. After the game, Felipe said Vágner Love's provocations, before the game.

On 29 April, Vasco da Gama over a bitter defeat in a final; this time it was against Botafogo: 3–1. In the first half, Botafogo opened a good lead: Sebastián Abreu, after quick play with Maicosuel and Márcio Azevedo, opened the scoring. In a cross from a free kick from Renato, "el Loco" Abreu scored his second, and second of Botafogo. In the second half, Vasco da Gama was the handicap chase. But he took a "cold shower"; Fagner missed the ball time and Maicosuel left free to make the third goal. Carlos Alberto, in a beautiful play with Rodolfo, fell, but was too late. Despite all this, the main character in the game was eventually Fernanda Maia, who gained sudden fame, soon after starting. The ball girl was the main person in charge of Botafogo's first goal in the match that the ball quickly reinstated Maicosuel, and with her beauty, drew the attention of Fagner and Rômulo.

=== May ===
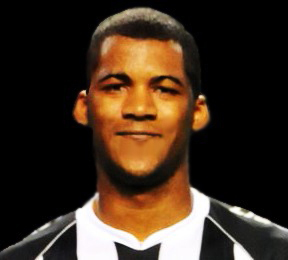
Renato Silva was able to replace up to the idol Dedé, while the same was injured

On 2 May, Vasco da Gama won Lanús by 2–1, in São Januário. The game was truncated, leaving up the first goal of the match: Éder Luís crossed for Alecsandro, who, with knee, opened the scoring. In the first half, Diego Souza did a golazo: applied a hat in Diego Braghieri and kicked without letting the ball drop. In the second half, the pace of Vasco da Gama decreased, and the team was not forgiven: after failure of Fagner, Mario Regueiro made the Lanús' goal of the match. Because of substitutions during the game, Cristóvão Borges was booed during and after the match. Because of this, the players left the field "escorting" his coach.

On 9 May, Vasco da Gama led the change of Lanús: lost by 2–1, in "La Fortaleza". At the beginning of the match after good play with Juninho Pernambucano, Nílton hit a shot from 93 km/h, making a golazo. But, just as in the first game, the rhythm of the team fell in the second half: Diego Valeri gave a good pass to Mariano Pavone, who get Fernando Prass of play and draw. The pressure continued. Maximiliano Velázquez kicked out of the area; Fernando Prass has rebound, and Teófilo Gutiérrez made the second goal of Lanús. With the end of the match and the teams tied tightly, turned out a penalty shootout. All players of Vasco da Gama (Felipe, Juninho Pernambucano, Carlos Alberto, Renato Silva and Alecsandro) converted. For Lanús, Mario Regueiro, Maximiliano Velázquez, Mauro Camoranesi and Matías Fritzler did. Silvio Romero, in the second kick of Lanús, commanded the post. Victory of Vasco da Gama on penalties by 5–4.

On 11 May, Vasco da Gama announced the departure of Allan for Udinese Calcio. Because Allan have their most of their rights pertaining to the Deportivo Maldonado, Vasco da Gama earned only 20% of trading (approximately R$ 1.5 million). The crowd rebuked the output of the player, both for the quality and the identification of Allan with the club. Because of the transfer window, Allan can play for another month by Vasco da Gama.

On 16 May, Vasco da Gama and Corinthians staged a truncated game and fought with little technical (strength of the teams). The result was no different: 0–0 at São Januário. With the storm that hit the Rio de Janeiro, the lawn was filled with mud. In addition, the times were in excess with respect to each other. The football game turned into a chess game, and there were few clear opportunities to score. The first: Jorge Henrique butt and Fernando Prass make a great save, with the right foot. And the second: Alecsandro butt, and make a goal (nullified by the referee Sandro Ricci).

On 20 May, Vasco da Gama made his debut with victory in the Brazilian Série A: 2–1 at Grêmio in São Januário. While Vasco da Gama played with the reserve team, aiming the game against Corinthians 3 days later, Grêmio played with mixed team, aiming the game against Bahia 4 days later (for the Copa do Brasil). In a strong and creeping free-kick, Fellipe Bastos scored the first goal of Vasco da Gama in the competition. The Grêmio's answer came soon after a good played with Rondinelly, Fernando had with the luck (Nílton's deviation) to break even. In the second half, Juninho Pernambucano and Alecsandro entered the game and set: intersection of Juninho Pernambucano and butt from Alecsandro: 2–1. The game also featured a penalty: Marcelo Martins Moreno hit, but Fernando Prass saved.

On 23 May, Vasco da Gama said goodbye to the Copa Libertadores, after being defeated by Corinthians by 1–0 at Pacaembu in São Paulo. The game, like the first, was hotly disputed, with both teams cautious, and because of that, there were few clear opportunities. The clearest of these was Diego Souza: after failure of Alessandro, who kicked the ball on the attacking midfielder, Diego Souza shot of middle-of-field, unmarked, alone. When he arrived in the area, Diego Souza just kicking poor and dirty, allowing the defense of Cássio in a move that left the Pacaembu in silence. At 88 minutes, when the match was heading for penalties, Alex knocked sideways and Paulinho jumped and headed, with no chance for Fernando Prass; Corinthians' joy and relief, and Vasco da Gama's sadness and disbelief, who bade farewell to the Copa Libertadores in a traumatic way.

On 26 May, Vasco da Gama released Kim to negotiate with Náutico. Kim, and didn't have many chances, didn't play a good role in the season, although he scored a beautiful goal.

On the same day of the Kim's release, Vasco da Gama healed the "hangover" by the elimination in Copa Libertadores winning Portuguesa by 1–0 at Canindé in São Paulo. Despite the erosion of fighting against Corinthians, the team struggled and succeeded, after a beautiful goal: Fagner won in a divided against Raí and crossed; Alecsandro straightened his body and hit a beautiful bicycle kick: a golazo!

=== June ===
On 6 June, in a beautiful game, Vasco da Gama beat Náutico by 4–2 in São Januário. Alecsandro, following table between Éder Luís and Fellipe Bastos, opened the scoring. After, Felipe was free to go ahead and drop a missile and scoring the second goal of the night. In the second half, a lot of goals left: Diego Souza passed for Juninho Pernambucano, who even marked by four defenders, made a beautiful goal: 3–0. After this, Souza stole the ball of Fellipe Bastos, and touched for Martinez, who dribbled Juninho Pernambucano before making 3–1. Immediately, Alecsandro scored his second goal of the match, after a cross from Felipe. Still had time for one more: after a long pass from Rhayner, Araújo won Renato Silva in the race, dribbled Fernando Prass, and gave final numbers to match: 4–2, and party in Rio de Janeiro.

On 10 June, in another great game, Vasco da Gama won Bahia 2–1 at Pituaçu in Salvador, Bahia. The two crowds were out in force at the stadium, and provided a show, which combined with the proper game. Early on, Diego Souza was fouled, and Juninho Pernambucano showed why he is considered one of the best free kickers in history to score a goal that left Marcelo Lomba property. The game continued at high speed and with both teams looking to attack. And Vasco da Gama arrived at his second goal: after a chest pass by Alecsandro, Diego Souza dribbled Titi and covered Marcelo Lomba, making a golazo and being cheered by the crowd in this stadium. In the second half, the rate decreased, and Bahia, desperate for a reaction, did Vasco da Gama become more cornered. But the goal of honor only came in stoppage: Júnior, after fighting in the area, made the goal of Bahia in the last move of the match: a Samba party in the Axé land.

On 13 June, the Argentine Matías Abelairas was released to negotiate with Puebla. Abelairas showed their dissatisfaction by not getting many chances in the team, and asked to be released (this claim has been satisfied), and enter into negotiation with the Mexican team.

On 17 June, Vasco da Gama lost his perfect recovery in Brazilian Série A in a draw against Palmeiras in Arena Barueri. The match was very busy, but the goals came only in the second half. Mazinho, after a broken up dribbling in Dedé, opened the scoring. But Juninho Pernambucano made his second consecutive goal in the competition in a free kick that surprised Deola.

On 23 June, Vasco da Gama suffered his first defeat in Brazilian Série A: 1–3 against Cruzeiro in a packed São Januário. Vasco da Gama printed your tiki-taka style, coming to be with 65% of ball possession. But Cruzeiro, with a well-armed boom, managed to hold the Vasco da Gama's momentum, and was rewarded: after an error between Fernando Prass and Éder Luís, Wellington Paulista kicked, and the ball fell to Walter Montillo, who kicked at an angle, silencing the stadium. In the second half, the outlook has not changed. Then came the Cruzeiro second goal: Walter Montillo released for Wellington Paulista, which gave a light touch, covering Fernando Prass. Immediately, the Vasco da Gama scored his goal: to cross the area, Fábio went wrong, and Rodolfo dropped. But the reaction stopped there: New counterattack, Tinga crossed for Anselmo Ramon, who gave the final numbers game.

On 28 June, Vasco da Gama announced the transfer of the defensive midfielder Rômulo for Spartak Moscow. Rômulo's transfer was highly criticized by fans and media, who commented that, at worst hypothesis, should wait until the end of 2012 Summer Olympics for a possible appreciation of the young player.

On 30 June, Vasco da Gama beat Ponte Preta 3–2 in a dramatic game and highly disputed. Ponte Preta went ahead: Baraka launched, and Roger opened the scoring in São Januário. Vasco da Gama equalized immediately: after pass of Felipe and Alecsandro kicked and scored 1-1. Ponte Preta once again be front: Renê Junior played for Roger scoring his second goal in the match. In the second half, Vasco da Gama proved why it is known as the "time of the turn". Éder Luís, after touch of Alecsandro, equalized. Missing 15 minutes to the end of the game, William Matheus is overthrown by Lucas: Diego Souza charges very strong, and takes Vasco da Gama to victory.

=== July ===
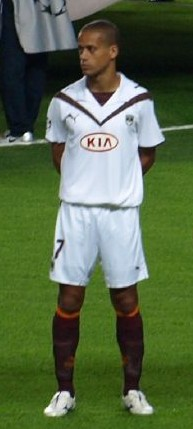
Wendel was the main employment of Vasco da Gama's mid-season in 2012

On 8 July, Vasco da Gama drew with Figueirense at Orlando Scarpelli, in Florianópolis: 1-1. In the first half, Vasco da Gama dominated the match and scored his goal: Diego Souza kicked crawling and open the score. In the second half, Figueirense came to dominate the game, and tied, after crossing, Roni anticipated William Matheus, and scored the last goal of the match.

On 10 July, Vasco da Gama announced the signing of midfielder Wendel, from Al-Shabab FC (Riyadh). The hiring was approved by the media and fans, reminding of his passages by Santos and Cruzeiro.

On 15 July, Vasco da Gama defeat Atlético Goianiense 1–0 in São Januário. Early in the match, Alecsandro, after free kick from Juninho Pernambucano, turned, and told with the help of Gabriel to score. Despite the victory, the team was extremely booed by the crowd because of its poor performance, causing Fernando Prass leave the field as the hero of the night.

On 18 July, Vasco da Gama defeat São Paulo 1–0 in Morumbi, São Paulo. Since the beginning of the match, Vasco da Gama imposed his tiki-taka play style, involving a confused and messy São Paulo team. The team took a lot of danger with the Juninho Pernambucano's knuckleballs, who were stopped, or by Denis, or by post. But the goal came in the second half: after a beautiful table with Wiliam Barbio, Fagner invaded the area and made the only goal of the match, which could have been such a rout the superiority of Vasco da Gama on top of São Paulo.

On 21 July, Vasco da Gama suffered two casualties: the outputs of Diego Souza and Fagner. The first was coveted by Al-Ittihad for a long time. And the desire of the Saudi team was able to realize his wish, and managed to sign the midfielder, who was greeted with celebrations at the Airport International of Jeddah. Fagner already received an offer last minute of Wolfsburg. The proposal was readily accepted by the player. On the same day, the crew of Vasco da Gama completed the signing of Dakson. The midfielder, from the Bulgarian Lokomotiv Plovdiv, came to the club surrounded by mistrust, because, despite being an idol in the Bulgarian team, is virtually unknown in Brazilian football.

On 25 July, Vasco da Gama defeat Botafogo 1–0 in Engenhão. The game was pretty much expected by the confrontation between Juninho Pernambucano and Clarence Seedorf, two of the best players in the Brasileirão. The Surinamese-Dutch midfielder got to play well, but the Brazilian midfielder had another gala performance: missing 2 minutes, Juninho Pernambucano invaded the area, but if balance and fell. Lying on the lawn, dribbled two Botafogo players and touch to Alecsandro scoring the winning goal, making O Reizinho da Colina ("The King of the Hill") got out of the field cheered.

On 28 July, Vasco da Gama drew with International 0–0 at Beira-Rio, Porto Alegre. The match was surrounded, because it marked the debut of Diego Forlán in Brazilian football, playing for Internacional. But the match turned out to be warm and flat, despite the great public and the high quality of both teams.

=== August ===
On 5 August, Vasco da Gama drew 0–0 with Corinthians in São Januário, Rio de Janeiro. Like the first match between them for Copa Libertadores, the game was very truncated, and very few clear opportunities, which resulted in a goalless score.

On 8 August, Vasco da Gama won Sport 2–0 at Ilha do Retiro, Recife. In a complicated game and truncated, mainly because of the soggy lawn because of the rain, the Vasco da Gama opened the scoring on a beautiful free kick from Juninho Pernambucano (the entire game booed by the crowd of Sport, being ex-player club). Soon after, in a defense of inattention, the Ecuadorian Carlos Tenorio dribbled two markers and keeper to make a great goal and give final numbers to match.

On 12 August, Vasco da Gama lost to Atlético Mineiro: 1–0 in Independência, in Belo Horizonte. The game between two of the top three teams was as expected: busy, rushed, and extremely technical. Nevertheless, the first half ended goalless. In the second half, Vasco da Gama decided to retreat too, and hence Atletico Mineiro took control of the match. With that, eventually reaching its goal: Ronaldinho dribbled Auremir and crossed; Fernando Prass flattened, and Jô headed into the goal, leading to delirium nearly 20,000 fans who were at the stadium and made a party.

On 16 August, Vasco da Gama drew 2–2 with Coritiba in São Januário, Rio de Janeiro. In the first half, Vasco da Gama, pressed after the defeat against Atlético Mineiro, had a horrible performance, which culminated in the goal of Júnior Urso, after counterattack that began with Éverton Ribeiro. In the second half, Vasco da Gama recovered: in the beautiful play from Carlos Alberto, Felipe equalized the match. At 88 minutes, a free kick from Juninho Pernambucano, Wendel turned the match. The crowd began to party, but two minutes later, Éverton Ribeiro, after crossing scored the equalizer. The crowd, which was celebrating two minutes before, started booing and humiliate the team and his crew until after the end of the match.

== Club ==
=== Coaching staff ===
Position	Staff
Manager	(Brazil) Ricardo Gomes
Head Coach	(Brazil) Gaúcho
Assistant coaches	(Brazil) Gaúcho (Brazil) Silveira (Brazil) Jorge Luiz
Physiologists	(Brazil) Rodnei (Brazil) Daniel Gonçalves
Supervisors	(Brazil) Daniel Freitas (football) (Brazil) Fabiano Lunz (logistics) (Brazil) Bruno Coev (heritage)
Fitness coaches	(Brazil) Rodrigo Poletto (Brazil) Romildo (Brazil) Armando
Masseurs	(Brazil) PC (Brazil) Carlão (Brazil) Curumim
Wardrobes	(Brazil) Adão (Brazil) Niltinho
Physicologist	(Brazil) Maria Helena Rodriguez
Nutritionist	(Brazil) Mildre Souza
Press officers	(Brazil) Patrícia Gregório (Brazil) Vinicius Melo
Goalkeepers coach	(Brazil) Carlos Germano

Updated to match played 5 December 2011
Source: CR Vasco da Gama

=== Other information ===
President	(Brazil) Roberto Dinamite
2nd Senior Vice President & Finance	(Brazil) Nelson Rocha
1st Senior Vice President & Communication	(Brazil) Antonio Frutuoso Pires Peralta
Vice President of Marketing	(Brazil) Fabio Fernandes
Vice President of Football	(Brazil) José Hamilton Mandarino
Vice President of Heritage	(Brazil) Frederico Lopes
Vice President of Legislation	(Brazil) Anibal Rouxinol
Vice President of Social	(Brazil) Faues Cherene "Mussa" Jassus
Vice President of Medicine	(Brazil) Manoel Moutinho
Vice President of Olympic sports & Social responsibility	(Brazil) José Pinto Monteiro
Vice President of Nautical sports	(Brazil) Paulo Cesar Mahomed Alli
Vice President of Specialized relations	(Brazil) João Ernesto da Costa Ferreira
Executive Directors of Football	(Brazil) Franklin Assunção (Brazil) Daniel Freitas
Ground (capacity and dimensions)	São Januário (23,500 / 110x75 meters)

Updated to match played 8 March 2011
Source: CR Vasco da Gama

=== Official sponsors ===
- (Brazil) Eletrobras
- (Brazil) Penalty
- (Brazil) Brahma
- (Italy) Technogym
- (Italy) TIM
- Brazil Foodservice Group (BFG)
- (United States) Visa
- (Brazil) Guaraná Antarctica

Source: CR Vasco da Gama

=== Kits ===
Home	Away	Third

== Players ==
=== Current squad ===
Note: Flags indicate national team as defined under FIFA eligibility rules; some limited exceptions apply. Players may hold more than one non-FIFA nationality. Squad correct as of 5 November 2012.

No.	Pos.	Nation	Player
1	GK	BRA	Fernando Prass
2	DF	BRA	Thiago Feltri
3	DF	BRA	Fabrício (on loan from Atlético Paranaense)
4	DF	BRA	Rodolfo
5	MF	BRA	Eduardo Costa
6	MF	BRA	Felipe
7	FW	BRA	Éder Luís
8	MF	BRA	Juninho Pernambucano (Captain)
9	FW	BRA	Alecsandro
10	FW	BRA	Carlos Alberto
11	FW	ECU	Carlos Tenorio
12	GK	BRA	Alessandro
13	DF	BRA	Jonas
14	DF	BRA	Luan (youth player)
15	FW	BRA	Jonathan
16	DF	BRA	Douglas
17	FW	BRA	Pipico
18	DF	BRA	William Matheus (on loan from Boca Júnior (SE))
19	MF	BRA	Nílton
21	MF	BRA	Fellipe Bastos
22	MF	BRA	Abuda
23	MF	BRA	Renato Augusto
25	MF	BRA	Auremir
26	DF	BRA	Dedé
27	MF	BRA	Diego Rosa
29	MF	BRA	Jhon Cley (youth player)
31	MF	BRA	Marlone (youth player)
33	DF	BRA	Renato Silva
36	DF	BRA	Dieyson (youth player)
37	FW	BRA	Maicon Assis
41	FW	BRA	Romário (youth player)
43	DF	BRA	Max
44	FW	BRA	William Barbio
45	MF	ARG	Leandro Chaparro (on loan from Desportivo Brasil)
50	GK	BRA	Diogo Silva
77	MF	BRA	Wendel
87	MF	BRA	Dakson

=== Squad information ===
As of 21 July 2012.

No.	Name	Nationality	Position (s)	Date of birth (age)	Signed from
Goalkeepers
1	Fernando Prass	(Brazil)	GK	9 July 1978 (aged 34)	(Portugal) União de Leiria
12	Alessandro	(Brazil)	GK	30 March 1988 (aged 24)	(Brazil) Grêmio
50	Diogo Silva	(Brazil)	GK	7 August 1986 (aged 26)	(Brazil) Vasco da Gama (loaned from Nova Iguaçu)
Defenders
2	Thiago Feltri	(Brazil)	LB	18 May 1985 (aged 27)	(Brazil) Atlético Goianiense
3	Fabrício (on loan from Atlético Paranaense)	(Brazil)	CB / LB	20 February 1990 (aged 22)	(Brazil) Atlético Paranaense
4	Rodolfo	(Brazil)	CB	23 October 1982 (aged 30)	(Russia) Lokomotiv Moscow
13	Jonas	(Brazil)	RB	10 February 1987 (aged 25)	(Brazil) Coritiba
14	Luan (youth player)	(Brazil)	CB / RB	10 May 1993 (aged 19)	Youth system
16	Douglas	(Brazil)	CB	30 October 1990 (aged 22)	(Brazil) América de Natal
18	William Matheus (on loan from Boca Júnior (SE))	(Brazil)	LB	2 April 1990 (aged 22)	(Brazil) Bahia (loaned from Boca Júnior (SE))
25	Auremir	(Brazil)	RB / DMF	10 September 1991 (aged 21)	(Brazil) Náutico
26	Dedé	(Brazil)	CB	1 July 1988 (aged 24)	(Brazil) Vasco da Gama (loaned from Volta Redonda)
33	Renato Silva	(Brazil)	CB	26 July 1983 (aged 29)	(Brazil) Vasco da Gama (loaned from Shandong Luneng)
36	Dieyson (youth player)	(Brazil)	LB	30 June 1993 (aged 19)	Youth system
43	Max	(Brazil)	RB / LB	28 April 1990 (aged 22)	Youth system
Midfielders
5	Eduardo Costa	(Brazil)	DMF	23 September 1982 (aged 30)	(Brazil) Vasco da Gama (loaned from AS Monaco)
6	Felipe	(Brazil)	LSM / AMF / LWM / LB	2 September 1977 (aged 35)	(Qatar) Al Sadd
8	Juninho Pernambucano (C)	(Brazil)	AMF / CMF	30 January 1975 (aged 37)	(Qatar) Al-Gharafa
10	Carlos Alberto	(Brazil)	AMF / SS / CF	11 December 1984 (aged 28)	(Brazil) Bahia (loaned from Vasco da Gama)
19	Nílton	(Brazil)	DMF	21 April 1987 (aged 25)	(Brazil) Corinthians
21	Fellipe Bastos	(Brazil)	CMF	1 February 1990 (aged 22)	(Brazil) Vasco da Gama (loaned from Benfica)
22	Abuda	(Brazil)	DMF	22 January 1989 (aged 23)	(Brazil) Cruzeiro (Porto Alegre)
23	Renato Augusto	(Brazil)	DMF / CMF	17 July 1990 (aged 22)	(Brazil) Atlético Goianiense (loaned from Vasco da Gama)
27	Diego Rosa	(Brazil)	AMF / LWM / RWM / CMF / SS	22 March 1989 (aged 23)	(Brazil) Juventude
29	Jhon Cley (youth player)	(Brazil)	CMF / AMF	9 March 1994 (aged 18)	Youth system
31	Marlone (youth player)	(Brazil)	AMF / SS / LW	2 April 1992 (aged 20)	Youth system
45	Leandro Chaparro (on loan from Desportivo Brasil)	(Argentina)	RSM / RWM / AMF	7 January 1991 (aged 21)	(Argentina) San Lorenzo de Almagro
77	Wendel	(Brazil)	LWM / LB / LSM	8 April 1982 (aged 30)	(Saudi Arabia) Al-Shabab FC (Riyadh)
87	Dakson	(Brazil)	AMF	11 July 1987 (aged 25)	(Bulgaria) Lokomotiv Plovdiv
Forwards
7	Éder Luís	(Brazil)	RW / ST / SS	19 April 1985 (aged 27)	(Brazil) Vasco da Gama (loaned from Benfica)
9	Alecsandro	(Brazil)	ST / CF	4 February 1981 (aged 31)	(Brazil) Internacional
11	Carlos Tenorio	(Ecuador)	ST	14 May 1979 (aged 33)	(United Arab Emirates) Al-Nasr Dubai
15	Jonathan	(Brazil)	SS / AMF / LW / RW	11 May 1991 (aged 21)	Youth system
17	Pipico	(Brazil)	CF	7 March 1985 (aged 27)	(Brazil) Macaé
37	Maicon Assis	(Brazil)	SS / AMF / LW / RW	4 March 1990 (aged 22)	(Brazil) Arapongas (loaned from Vasco da Gama)
41	Romário (youth player)	(Brazil)	ST	15 January 1992 (aged 20)	Youth system
44	William Barbio	(Brazil)	RW / SS / LW	22 October 1992 (aged 20)	(Brazil) Vasco da Gama (loaned from Nova Iguaçu)

Players with Dual Nationality

- (Brazil) (Germany) Fernando Prass

=== Out of loan ===
As of 16 January 2011.

No.	Name	Nationality	Position (s)	Date of birth (age)	Signed from
Goalkeepers
	Conrado (on loan to Americano)	(Brazil)	GK	8 January 1991 (aged 21)	(Brazil) Artsul
	Tiago (on loan to Grêmio Barueri)	(Brazil)	GK	2 July 1983 (aged 29)	(Brazil) Bahia (loan from Vasco da Gama)
Defenders
	Cesinha (on loan to Náutico)	(Brazil)	CB	8 October 1986 (aged 26)	(Brazil) Vasco da Gama
	Márcio Careca (on loan to Ceará)	(Brazil)	LB	28 July 1978 (aged 34)	(Brazil) Mirassol (loan from Vasco da Gama)
Midfielders
	Bernardo (on loan to Santos)	(Brazil)	AMF / CF / SS / LW	20 May 1990 (aged 22)	(Brazil) Vasco da Gama
	Caíque (on loan to Gyeongnam)	(Brazil)	AMF / CF	10 January 1987 (aged 25)	(Brazil) Avaí (loan from Vasco da Gama)
	Enrico (on loan to Ponte Preta)	(Brazil)	AMF	4 May 1984 (aged 28)	(Brazil) Ceará (loan from Vasco da Gama)
	Jeferson Silva (on loan to Duque de Caxias)	(Brazil)	AMF / SS	3 May 1990 (aged 22)	(Brazil) Nova Iguaçu (loan from Vasco da Gama)
	Marquinhos Moraes (on loan to Gloria Progresul Bistrița)	(Brazil)	LWM / LW / AMF / SS	21 June 1991 (aged 21)	(Brazil) America (RJ) (loan from Vasco da Gama)
	Mateus (on loan to Criciúma)	(Brazil)	DMF / CMF	18 May 1987 (aged 25)	(Saudi Arabia) Ettifaq (loan from Vasco da Gama)
Forwards
	Rodrigo Pimpão (on loan to América (MG))	(Brazil)	SS / LW / RW	23 October 1987 (aged 25)	(Brazil) Ponte Preta (loan from Vasco da Gama)

== Players movement and trades ==
=== In ===
Date	Player	Position	Previous club	Fee/notes	Ref
28 December 2011	(Brazil) Bernardo	MF	(Brazil) Vasco da Gama (on loan from Cruzeiro)	R$ 3,5 million	
1 January 2012	(Brazil) William Barbio	FW	(Brazil) Vasco da Gama (on loan from Nova Iguaçu)	R$ unknown	
3 January 2012	(Brazil) Rodolfo	DF	(Russia) Lokomotiv Moscow	Free transfer, end of contract	
4 January 2012	(Brazil) Thiago Feltri	DF	(Brazil) Atlético Goianiense	Free transfer, end of contract	
10 January 2012	(Argentina) Matías Abelairas	MF	Free agent	Free transfer	
14 January 2012	(Ecuador) Carlos Tenorio	FW	(United Arab Emirates) Al-Nasr	Free transfer, end of contract	
21 April 2012	(Brazil) Pipico	FW	(Brazil) Macaé	unknown	
2 June 2012	(Brazil) Abuda	MF	(Brazil) Cruzeiro (Porto Alegre)	unknown	
19 June 2012	(Brazil) Fellipe Bastos	MF	(Brazil) Vasco da Gama (on loan from Benfica)	R$ 2,5 million	
19 June 2012	(Brazil) Éder Luís	FW	(Brazil) Vasco da Gama (on loan from Benfica)	R$ 5 million	
7 July 2012	(Brazil) Diogo Silva	GK	(Brazil) Vasco da Gama (on loan from Nova Iguaçu)	R$ 1 million	
10 July 2012	(Brazil) Wendel	MF	(Saudi Arabia) Al-Shabab FC (Riyadh)	Free transfer, mutual rescission contract	
16 July 2012	(Brazil) Auremir	MF	(Brazil) Náutico	R$ unknown (35% of federal rights)	
20 July 2012	(Brazil) Renato Silva	DF	(Brazil) Vasco da Gama (on loan from Shandong Luneng Taishan)	Free transfer, end of contract	
21 July 2012	(Brazil) Dakson	MF	(Bulgaria) Lokomotiv Plovdiv	R$ 460,000	
30 July 2012	(Brazil) Jonas	DF	(Brazil) Coritiba	R$ 1,5 million (50% of federal rights)	

==== Loan in ====
Date from	Date to	Player	Position	Previous club	Fee/notes	Ref
30 June 2011	19 June 2012	(Brazil) Fellipe Bastos	MF	(Switzerland) Servette (on loan from Benfica)	Previously on Vasco da Gama on loan from Benfica (28 June 2010 to 30 June 2011), loan transfer from Benfica	
30 June 2011	19 June 2012	(Brazil) Éder Luís	FW	(Portugal) Benfica	Previously on Vasco da Gama on loan from Benfica (28 June 2010 to 30 June 2011), loan transfer from Benfica	
4 July 2012	20 July 2012	(Brazil) Renato Silva	DF	(China) Shandong Luneng Taishan	Loan transfer from Shandong Luneng Taishan	
1 January 2012	31 December 2012	(Argentina) Leandro Chaparro	MF	(Argentina) San Lorenzo de Almagro	Previously on Vasco da Gama on loan from Desportivo Brasil (16 February 2011 to 31 December 2011), loan transfer from Desportivo Brasil	
5 March 2012	31 December 2012	(Brazil) Fabrício	DF	(Brazil) Atlético Paranaense	Loan transfer	
18 June 2012	31 December 2012	(Brazil) William Matheus	DF	(Brazil) Bahia (on loan from Boca Júnior (SE))	Loan transfer	

=== Out ===
Date	Player	Position	Destination club	Fee/notes	Ref
8 December 2011	(Paraguay) Julio Irrazábal	DF	N/A	End of contract	
9 December 2011	(Brazil) Gian Mariano	DF	(Brazil) Ponte Preta	Released, end of contract, free transfer	
11 December 2011	(Brazil) Jadson Viera	DF	(Uruguay) Nacional	Mutual rescission contract, free transfer	
1 January 2012	(Brazil) Adilson	GK	N/A	Released, end of contract	
2 January 2012	(Brazil) Jéferson	MF	(Brazil) Bahia	Mutual rescission contract, free transfer	
3 January 2012	(Brazil) Lipe	FW	(Brazil) Santacruzense	Released, free transfer	
11 January 2012	(Brazil) Patric	FW	(Brazil) Vila Nova	Free transfer	
13 January 2012	(Brazil) Rafael Coelho	FW	(China) Guangzhou R&F	R$ 4 million	
25 January 2012	(Brazil) Ari	DF	(Brazil) Duque de Caxias	Released, end of contract, free transfer	
28 February 2012	(Brazil) Élder Granja	DF	(Brazil) Juventude	End of contract	
11 May 2012	(Brazil) Allan	MF	(Italy) Udinese Calcio	R$ 1,5 million (20% of federal rights)	
26 May 2012	(Brazil) Kim	FW	(Brazil) Náutico	End of contract, free transfer	
5 June 2012	(Brazil) Magno	MF	(Brazil) Bahia	Mutual rescission contract, free transfer	
13 June 2012	(Argentina) Matías Abelairas	MF	(Mexico) Puebla	Mutual rescission contract, free transfer	
28 June 2012	(Brazil) Rômulo	MF	(Russia) Spartak Moscow	R$ 10,35 million (50% of federal rights)	
16 July 2012	(Brazil) Edu Pina	DF	(Brazil) Macaé	Released, end of contract, free transfer	
21 July 2012	(Brazil) Diego Souza	MF	(Saudi Arabia) Al-Ittihad	R$ 6,6 million (33% of federal rights)	
21 July 2012	(Brazil) Fagner	DF	(Germany) Wolfsburg	R$ 2 million (20% of federal rights)	

==== Loan out ====
Date from	Date to	Player	Position	Destination club	Fee/notes	Ref
23 May 2011	30 June 2012	(Brazil) Edu Pina	DF	(Brazil) Duque de Caxias	Previously on Boavista on loan from Vasco da Gama (14 January 2011 at 23 May 2011), loan transfer	
13 December 2011	31 December 2012	(Brazil) Enrico	MF	(Brazil) Ponte Preta	Loan transfer	
13 December 2011	30 June 2012	(Brazil) Rodrigo Pimpão	FW	(Brazil) Ponte Preta	Loan transfer	
21 December 2011	31 December 2012	(Brazil) Caíque	MF	(South Korea) Gyeongnam FC	Loan transfer	
1 January 2012	5 June 2012	(Brazil) Magno	MF	(Brazil) Bahia	Previously on Bahia on loan from Vasco da Gama (15 December 2010 at 31 December 2011), loan transfer	
1 January 2012	31 December 2012	(Brazil) Mateus	MF	(Brazil) Criciúma	Previously on Criciúma on loan from Vasco da Gama (27 June 2011 at 31 December 2011), loan transfer	
7 January 2012	12 March 2012	(Brazil) Márcio Careca	DF	(Brazil) Mirassol	Loan transfer	
13 January 2012	30 June 2012	(Brazil) Jeferson Silva	MF	(Brazil) Nova Iguaçu	Previously on Salgueiro on loan from Vasco da Gama (23 May 2011 at 31 December 2011), loan transfer	
25 January 2012	31 December 2012	(Brazil) Tiago	GK	(Brazil) Grêmio Barueri	Loan transfer	
1 February 2012	30 April 2012	(Brazil) Marquinhos Moraes	MF	(Brazil) America (RJ)	Loan transfer	
3 February 2012	31 December 2012	(Brazil) Nilson	FW	(Brazil) Paraná Clube	Previously on Criciúma on loan from Vasco da Gama, loan transfer	
1 March 2012	31 December 2012	(Brazil) Cesinha	DF	(Brazil) Náutico	Loan transfer	
12 March 2012	31 December 2012	(Brazil) Márcio Careca	DF	(Brazil) Ceará	Previously on Mirassol (7 January 2012 at 12 March 2012), loan transfer	
16 March 2012	31 December 2012	(Brazil) Bernardo	MF	(Brazil) Santos	Loan transfer	
1 July 2012	31 December 2012	(Brazil) Rodrigo Pimpão	FW	(Brazil) América (MG)	Previously on Ponte Preta (13 December 2011 at 31 June 2012), loan transfer	
1 July 2012	31 December 2012	(Brazil) Jeferson Silva	MF	(Brazil) Duque de Caxias	Previously on Nova Iguaçu on loan from Vasco da Gama (13 January 2012 at 30 June 2012), loan transfer	
1 July 2012	30 June 2013	(Brazil) Marquinhos Moraes	MF	(Romania) Gloria Bistrița	Loan transfer	

== Statistics ==
=== Appearances and goals ===
Last updated on 2 December 2012.

- Players in italic have left the club during the season.

No.	Pos	Nat	Player	Total		Rio de Janeiro State Championship		Copa Libertadores		Brasileirão Série A	
No.	Pos	Nat	Player	Apps	Goals	Apps	Goals	Apps	Goals	Apps	Goals
1	GK	(Brazil) BRA	Fernando Prass	64	0	17	0	10	0	37	0
2	DF	(Brazil) BRA	Thiago Feltri	35	1	14	1	10	0	7+4	0
3	DF	(Brazil) BRA	Fabrício	10	0	1	0	0	0	6+3	0
4	DF	(Brazil) BRA	Rodolfo	29	1	12	0	7+2	0	8	1
5	MF	(Brazil) BRA	Eduardo Costa	26	1	5+5	1	5	0	6+5	0
6	MF	(Brazil) BRA	Felipe	43	5	7+4	3	5+4	0	16+7	2
7	FW	(Brazil) BRA	Éder Luís	42	4	7+1	3	7	0	25+2	1
8	MF	(Brazil) BRA	Juninho Pernambucano	49	13	11+2	4	6+1	2	28+1	7
9	FW	(Brazil) BRA	Alecsandro	57	25	16	12	10	3	30+1	10
10	FW	(Brazil) BRA	Carlos Alberto	35	3	0+3	1	0+4	0	17+11	2
11	FW	(Ecuador) ECU	Carlos Tenorio	17	5	2	1	0+1	0	8+6	4
12	GK	(Brazil) BRA	Alessandro	3	0	2	0	0	0	1	0
13	DF	(Brazil) BRA	Jonas	16	1	0	0	0	0	14+2	1
15	FW	(Brazil) BRA	Jonathan	6	0	1+4	0	0	0	0+1	0
16	DF	(Brazil) BRA	Douglas	33	1	6	0	0+1	0	25+1	1
17	FW	(Brazil) BRA	Pipico	7	0	0	0	0	0	0+7	0
18	DF	(Brazil) BRA	William Matheus	21	0	0	0	0	0	19+2	0
19	MF	(Brazil) BRA	Nílton	54	5	9+4	0	6+1	1	34	4
21	MF	(Brazil) BRA	Fellipe Bastos	47	5	15+1	2	2+3	2	15+11	1
22	MF	(Brazil) BRA	Abuda	3	0	0	0	0	0	2+1	0
23	MF	(Brazil) BRA	Renato Augusto	1	0	0	0	0	0	0+1	0
25	MF	(Brazil) BRA	Auremir	15	0	0	0	0	0	12+3	0
26	DF	(Brazil) BRA	Dedé	37	1	9	0	5	1	22+1	0
27	MF	(Brazil) BRA	Diego Rosa	5	0	2+1	0	0	0	0+2	0
33	DF	(Brazil) BRA	Renato Silva	36	0	10+2	0	8	0	15+1	0
37	MF	(Brazil) BRA	Maicon Assis	2	0	0	0	0	0	0+2	0
43	DF	(Brazil) BRA	Max	13	0	3+2	0	1	0	3+4	0
44	FW	(Brazil) BRA	William Barbio	29	1	8+5	1	3+1	0	7+5	0
45	MF	(Argentina) ARG	Leandro Chaparro	6	0	4	0	0	0	0+2	0
50	GK	(Brazil) BRA	Diogo Silva	0	0	0	0	0	0	0	0
77	MF	(Brazil) BRA	Wendel	26	1	0	0	0	0	25+1	1
87	MF	(Brazil) BRA	Dakson	2	0	0	0	0	0	0+2	0
	FW	(Brazil) BRA	Bruno Paulo	0	0	0	0	0	0	0	0
Youth academy's players who participated during the season: (Statistics shown are the appearances made and goals scored while at Vasco da Gama first squad)
14	DF	(Brazil) BRA	Luan	4	1	0	0	0	0	2+2	1
28	DF	(Brazil) BRA	Jomar	0	0	0	0	0	0	0	0
29	MF	(Brazil) BRA	Jhon Cley	10	0	0+1	0	0	0	4+5	0
30	FW	(Brazil) BRA	Guilherme Morano	0	0	0	0	0	0	0	0
31	MF	(Brazil) BRA	Jonathan Marlone	9	0	0	0	0	0	5+4	0
34	MF	(Brazil) BRA	Jonatas Paulista	1	0	0+1	0	0	0	0	0
36	DF	(Brazil) BRA	Dieyson	6	0	4	0	0	0	2	0
39	FW	(Brazil) BRA	Yago	0	0	0	0	0	0	0	0
41	FW	(Brazil) BRA	Romário	4	1	0+1	0	0	0	2+1	1
42	MF	(Brazil) BRA	Guilherme	0	0	0	0	0	0	0	0
Players who left the club during the season: (Statistics shown are the appearances made and goals scored while at Vasco da Gama)
10	MF	(Brazil) BRA	Diego Souza (Traded to Al-Ittihad)	34	12	14+2	6	9	3	8+1	3
22	FW	(Brazil) BRA	Kim (Released)	6	1	0+5	1	0	0	1	0
23	DF	(Brazil) BRA	Fagner (Traded to Wolfsburg)	32	2	15	1	9	0	8	1
30	GK	(Brazil) BRA	Conrado (Released)	0	0	0	0	0	0	0	0
31	MF	(Brazil) BRA	Bernardo (Loaned to Santos)	5	1	3+2	1	0	0	0	0
35	DF	(Brazil) BRA	Allan (Traded to Udinese)	18	1	6+4	1	0+5	0	2+1	0
37	MF	(Brazil) BRA	Rômulo (Traded to Spartak Moscow)	17	1	6	1	7+1	0	2+1	0
38	MF	(Argentina) ARG	Matías Abelairas (Released)	3	0	0+3	0	0	0	0	0
	MF	(Brazil) BRA	Marquinhos Moraes (Loaned to Gloria Bistrița)	0	0	0	0	0	0	0	0

=== Top scorers ===
Includes all competitive matches. The list is sorted by shirt number when total goals are equal.

Ran	No.	Pos	Nat	Name	Rio de Janeiro State Championship	Copa Libertadores	Brasileirão Série A	Total
1	9	FW	(Brazil)	Alecsandro	12	3	10	25
2	8	MF	(Brazil)	Juninho Pernambucano	4	2	7	13
3	10	MF	(Brazil)	Diego Souza	6	3	3	12
4	7	FW	(Brazil)	Éder Luís	3	0	3	6
4	21	MF	(Brazil)	Fellipe Bastos	2	2	2	6
6	6	MF	(Brazil)	Felipe	3	0	2	5
6	11	FW	(Ecuador)	Carlos Tenorio	1	0	4	5
6	19	MF	(Brazil)	Nílton	0	1	4	5
9	84/10	FW	(Brazil)	Carlos Alberto	1	0	2	3
10	23	DF	(Brazil)	Fagner	1	0	1	2
11	2	DF	(Brazil)	Thiago Feltri	1	0	0	1
11	4	DF	(Brazil)	Rodolfo	0	0	1	1
11	5	MF	(Brazil)	Eduardo Costa	1	0	0	1
11	13	DF	(Brazil)	Jonas	0	0	1	1
11	14	DF	(Brazil)	Luan	0	0	1	1
11	16	DF	(Brazil)	Douglas	0	0	1	1
11	22	FW	(Brazil)	Kim	1	0	0	1
11	26	DF	(Brazil)	Dedé	0	1	0	1
11	31	MF	(Brazil)	Bernardo	1	0	0	1
11	35	MF	(Brazil)	Allan	1	0	0	1
11	37	MF	(Brazil)	Rômulo	1	0	0	1
11	41	FW	(Brazil)	Romário	0	0	1	1
11	44	FW	(Brazil)	William Barbio	1	0	0	1
11	77	MF	(Brazil)	Wendel	0	0	1	1
				Own Goal	0	1	1	2
				Total	40	13	45	98

=== Clean sheets ===
Includes all competitive matches

Ran	No.	Pos	Nat	Name	Rio de Janeiro State Championship	Copa Libertadores	Brasileirão Série A	Total
1	1	GK	(Brazil)	Fernando Prass	5	3	10	18
2	12	GK	(Brazil)	Alessandro	1	0	0	1
3	30	GK	(Brazil)	Conrado	0	0	0	0
3	50	GK	(Brazil)	Diogo Silva	0	0	0	0
				Total	6	3	10	19

=== Disciplinary record ===
R	No.	Pos	Nat	Name	Rio de Janeiro State Championship			Copa Libertadores			Brasileirão Série A			Total		
R	No.	Pos	Nat	Name	Yellow card	Double yellow card	Red card	Yellow card	Double yellow card	Red card	Yellow card	Double yellow card	Red card	Yellow card	Double yellow card	Red card
1	8	MF	(Brazil)	Juninho Pernambucano	2	0	0	3	1	0	9	0	0	14	1	0
1	19	MF	(Brazil)	Nílton	2	0	0	2	0	1	10	0	0	14	0	1
3	21	MF	(Brazil)	Fellipe Bastos	7	0	0	1	0	0	6	0	0	14	0	0
4	6	MF	(Brazil)	Felipe	4	0	0	0	0	0	9	0	0	13	0	0
5	4	DF	(Brazil)	Rodolfo	5	0	0	2	0	0	2	0	0	9	0	0
5	33	DF	(Brazil)	Renato Silva	3	0	0	1	0	1	4	0	0	8	0	1
7	16	DF	(Brazil)	Douglas	1	0	0	0	0	0	6	0	1	7	0	1
8	9	FW	(Brazil)	Alecsandro	3	0	0	1	0	0	3	0	0	7	0	0
8	26	DF	(Brazil)	Dedé	2	0	0	0	0	0	5	0	0	7	0	0
10	2	DF	(Brazil)	Thiago Feltri	3	0	0	2	0	0	0	0	0	5	0	0
10	5	MF	(Brazil)	Eduardo Costa	2	0	0	1	0	0	2	0	0	5	0	0
10	77	MF	(Brazil)	Wendel	0	0	0	0	0	0	5	0	0	5	0	0
13	18	DF	(Brazil)	William Matheus	0	0	0	0	0	0	4	0	0	4	0	0
13	13	DF	(Brazil)	Jonas	0	0	0	0	0	0	3	0	1	3	0	1
15	10	FW	(Brazil)	Carlos Alberto	0	0	0	0	0	0	3	0	0	3	0	0
15	44	FW	(Brazil)	Wiliam Barbio	0	0	0	1	0	0	2	0	0	3	0	0
17	1	GK	(Brazil)	Fernando Prass	0	0	0	1	0	0	1	0	0	2	0	0
17	3	DF	(Brazil)	Fabrício	0	0	0	0	0	0	2	0	0	2	0	0
17	7	FW	(Brazil)	Éder Luís	0	0	0	1	0	0	1	0	0	2	0	0
17	11	FW	(Ecuador)	Carlos Tenorio	0	0	0	0	0	0	2	0	0	2	0	0
17	22	MF	(Brazil)	Abuda	0	0	0	0	0	0	2	0	0	2	0	0
22	15	FW	(Brazil)	Jonathan	0	0	1	0	0	0	0	0	0	0	0	1
22	17	FW	(Brazil)	Pipico	0	0	0	0	0	0	0	0	1	0	0	1
22	25	MF	(Brazil)	Auremir	0	0	0	0	0	0	1	0	0	1	0	0
22	29	MF	(Brazil)	Jhon Cley	0	0	0	0	0	0	1	0	0	1	0	0
22	31	MF	(Brazil)	Jonathan Marlone	0	0	0	0	0	0	1	0	0	1	0	0
22	36	DF	(Brazil)	Dieyson	1	0	0	0	0	0	0	0	0	1	0	0
Players who left the club during the season: (Statistics shown are the cards applieds while at Vasco da Gama)
1	10	MF	(Brazil)	Diego Souza	5	0	0	1	0	1	0	0	0	6	0	1
2	23	DF	(Brazil)	Fagner	5	0	0	1	0	0	0	0	0	6	0	0
3	35	MF	(Brazil)	Allan	3	0	0	1	0	0	1	0	0	5	0	0
4	37	MF	(Brazil)	Rômulo	0	0	0	1	0	0	0	0	0	1	0	0
				Total	48	0	1	20	1	3	83	0	2	153	1	7

=== Squad formations ===
Qnt	Formation	Matches		
Qnt	Formation	Rio de Janeiro State Championship	Copa Libertadores	Brasileirão Série A
4	4–2–3–1	All other matches	All other matches	All other matches
4	4–4–2		1 (GS)	
4	4–4–2 diamond	5 (GB), 6 (GB), 2 (TR)	1 (16)	9, 21, 22, 23, 24, 25, 26, 27, 35
4	4–3–3	8 (RIO)	4 (GS)	34
4	4–4–1–1			36

Last updated: 4 November 2012
Source: Match reports in Competitions
Only competitive matches.

=== Overall ===
Games played	67 (19 Rio de Janeiro State Championship, 10 Copa Libertadores, 38 Brazilian Série A)
Games won	34 (13 Rio de Janeiro State Championship, 5 Copa Libertadores, 16 Brazilian Série A)
Games drawn	14 (2 Rio de Janeiro State Championship, 2 Copa Libertadores, 10 Brazilian Série A)
Games lost	19 (4 Rio de Janeiro State Championship, 3 Copa Libertadores, 12 Brazilian Série A)
Goals scored	98
Goals conceded	75
Goal difference	+23
Yellow cards	158
Red cards	8
Worst discipline	Juninho Pernambucano (14 (yellow card) , 1, 0 (red card) ) Nílton (14 (yellow card) , 0, 1 (red card) )
Best result	Macaé 1-4 – Rio de Janeiro State Championship
Worst result	0-4 Bahia – Brazilian Série A
Most appearances	Fernando Prass (64 appearances)
Top scorer	Alecsandro (25 goals)

Last updated: 2 December

== Friendlies ==
=== Edmundo's farewell ===
The only friendly of the Vasco da Gama in 2012 season was against Barcelona de Guayaquil, in a rematch of the final of the Copa Libertadores 1998. The friendly match was marked specially to mark the farewell of Edmundo, one of the greatest idols in the history of Vasco da Gama. The last match of Edmundo was the lost by 2–0, in São Januário, against Vitória, for the 2008 Brazilian Série A, which marked the only e unprecedented relegated of Vasco da Gama. The choice of opponent (Barcelona Guayaquil) was that the game that Edmundo would most like to play is the final of the Copa Libertadores, taking into account that Edmundo in this time was at Fiorentina, and that was the main player in Brazilian football in 1997, with more than primordial for the winning the 1997 Brazilian Série A.

28 March	Vasco da Gama	9-1	Barcelona de Guayaquil	Rio de Janeiro
19:30 (UTC−03:00)	Edmundo 13' (pen.), 35'; Alecsandro 23'; Juninho Pernambucano 41'; Éder Luís 47'; Fellipe Bastos 67'; Allan 71', 90+2'; Diego Souza 76'	Report; Report	Asencio 40'	Stadium: Estádio São Januário; Attendance: 21,247; Referee: Marcelo de Lima Henrique

== Competitions ==
=== Rio de Janeiro State Championship ===
Vasco da Gama were placed in Group B of the 2012 Campeonato Carioca with Fluminense, Boavista, Americano, Volta Redonda, Duque de Caxias, Bangu and Friburguense.

==== Overall standings ====
Pos	Team	Pld	W	D	L	GF	GA	GD	Pts	Qualification or relegation
2	Botafogo	15	9	6	0	35	12	+23	33	2013 Copa do Brasil (First Round)
3	Flamengo	15	11	3	1	27	9	+18	36	2013 Copa do Brasil (First Round)
4	Vasco da Gama	15	11	2	2	33	13	+20	35	2013 Copa do Brasil (Fourth Round) (Note: Fluminense and Vasco da Gama qualified for the fourth round of the Copa do Brasil by qualifying for the 2013 Copa Libertadores; their first round Copa do Brasil berths went to the next-best teams in the Campeonato Carioca)
5	Resende	15	7	4	4	20	21	−1	25	2013 Copa do Brasil (First Round) (Note: Resende initially qualified for the 2012 Campeonato Brasileiro Série D but gave up their berth. Volta Redonda entered the competition in their place.)
6	Volta Redonda	15	6	4	5	20	22	−2	22	2013 Copa do Brasil (First Round) and 2012 Campeonato Brasileiro Série D

==== Guanabara Cup ====
===== Group stage =====
Group B
Pos	Team	Pld	W	D	L	GF	GA	GD	Pts	Qualification or relegation
1	Vasco da Gama	7	7	0	0	16	3	+13	21	Advanced to the Semifinals
2	Fluminense	7	4	1	2	15	7	+8	13	Advanced to the Semifinals
3	Boavista	7	3	2	2	13	12	+1	11	Advanced to the Troféu Edilson Silva
4	Friburguense	7	3	2	2	10	10	0	11	Advanced to the Troféu Edilson Silva
5	Volta Redonda	7	3	2	2	10	11	−1	11	
6	Duque de Caxias	7	2	2	3	9	12	−3	8	
7	Americano	7	1	1	5	6	13	−7	4	
8	Bangu	7	0	0	7	7	18	−11	0	

Updated to match(es) played on 18 February 2012. Source:
Rules for classification: 1 points; 2 wins; 3 goal difference; 4 goals scored; 5 red cards received; 6 yellow cards received; 7 draw

====== Matches ======
22 January 1	Vasco da Gama	2-0	Americano	Macaé
17:00 (UTC−02:00)	Alecsandro 34'; Fagner 42'; Jonathan (red card); Fellipe Bastos (yellow card) 79'	Report; Report	(yellow card) 36' Pachola; (yellow card) 54' Pedro; (yellow card) 74' Evandro; (yellow card) 79' Marconi	Stadium: Estádio Cláudio Moacyr de Azevedo (Moacyrzão); Attendance: 6,920; Referee: Rodrigo Nunes de Sá

29 January 2	Duque de Caxias	1-3	Vasco da Gama	Macaé
17:00 (UTC−02:00)	Gilcimar 55'; Paulão (yellow card) 68'	Report; Report	75' (yellow card) 20' Diego Souza; 28' Juninho Pernambucano; 59' Alecsandro; (yellow card) 68' Rodolfo	Stadium: Estádio Cláudio Moacyr de Azevedo (Moacyrzão); Attendance: unknown Referee: Pathrice Maia

1 February 3	Bangu	1-3	Vasco da Gama	Rio de Janeiro
17:00 (UTC−02:00)	Tiano 38' (pen.); Abílio (yellow card) 22'; Carlos Renan (yellow card) 86'	Report; Report	Alecsandro 23' (pen.); Thiago Feltri 28' (yellow card) 37'; Bernardo 59'; Felipe (yellow card) 25'; Fellipe Bastos (yellow card) 42'	Stadium: Estádio Proletário Guilherme da Silveira Filho (Moça Bonita); Attendance: 6,611; Referee: André Rodrigo Rocha

5 February 4	Vasco da Gama	2-0	Friburguense	Rio de Janeiro
17:00 (UTC−02:00)	Diego Souza 45', 60'; Nílton (yellow card) 1'; Rodolfo (yellow card) 19'; Fagner (yellow card) 85'	Report; Report	Ziquinha (yellow card) 2'; Sérgio Gomes (yellow card) 47'; Lucas (yellow card) 55'	Stadium: Estádio Vasco da Gama (São Januário); Attendance: 8,540; Referee: Grazianni Maciel Rocha

15 February 5	Vasco da Gama	3-0	Volta Redonda	Rio de Janeiro
19:30 (UTC−02:00)	Alecsandro 15', 39' (pen.); Wiliam Barbio 17'; Fellipe Bastos (yellow card) 90'; Rodolfo (yellow card) 90'	Report; Report	Naldo (yellow card) 45'; João Paulo (yellow card) 62'; Roberto (yellow card) 75'	Stadium: Estádio Vasco da Gama (São Januário); Attendance: 3,687; Referee: Marcelo Pacheco

12 February 6	Vasco da Gama	2-1	Fluminense	Rio de Janeiro
19:30 (UTC−02:00)	Alecsandro 60', 79'; Dedé (yellow card) 50'; Felipe (yellow card) 54'; Nílton (yellow card) 69'	Report; Report	7' Thiago Neves; (yellow card) 39' Diguinho; (yellow card) 43' Bruno; (yellow card) 62' Leandro Euzebio; (yellow card) 84' Carlinhos; (yellow card) 88' Wellington Nem; (yellow card) 75' (yellow-red card) 88' Edinho; (yellow card) 88' (yellow-red card) 90' Fred	Stadium: Estádio Olímpico João Havelange (Engenhão); Attendance: 10,416; Referee: Antonio Schneider

18 February 7	Boavista	0-1	Vasco da Gama	Rio de Janeiro
19:00 (UTC−02:00)	Paulo Rodrigues (yellow card) 56'; Bruno Costa (yellow card) 84'; Helton (yellow card) 88'	Report; Report	Kim 79'	Stadium: Estádio Olímpico João Havelange (Engenhão); Attendance: 3,002; Referee: Luis Antonio Silva dos Santos

===== Knockout stage =====
====== Matches ======
22 February Semifinal	Vasco da Gama	2-1	Flamengo	Rio de Janeiro
22:00 (UTC−02:00)	Alecsandro 15'; Diego Souza 78'; Thiago Feltri (yellow card) 83'; Fellipe Bastos (yellow card) 90+1'	Report; Report	3' Vágner Love; (yellow card) 55' Ronaldinho; (yellow card) 83' Negueba	Stadium: Estádio Olímpico João Havelange (Engenhão); Attendance: 21,482; Referee: Luis Antonio Silva dos Santos

26 February Final	Vasco da Gama	1-3	Fluminense	Rio de Janeiro
16:00 (UTC−03:00)	Eduardo Costa 83' (yellow card) 68'; Juninho Pernambucano (yellow card) 31'; Dedé (yellow card) 77'	Report; Report	36' (pen.), 57' (yellow card) 90+2' Fred; 42' (yellow card) 32' Deco; (yellow card) 26' Wellington Nem; (yellow card) 70' Diguinho	Stadium: Estádio Olímpico João Havelange (Engenhão); Attendance: 36,374; Referee: Marcelo de Lima Henrique

==== Rio Cup ====
===== Group stage =====
Group B
Pos	Team	Pld	W	D	L	GF	GA	GD	Pts	Qualification or relegation
1	Bangu	8	4	3	1	10	5	+5	15	Advanced to the Semifinals
2	Vasco da Gama	8	4	2	2	17	10	+7	14	Advanced to the Semifinals
3	Fluminense	8	4	1	3	15	10	+5	13	Advanced to the Troféu Luiz Penido
4	Volta Redonda	8	3	2	3	10	11	−1	11	Advanced to the Troféu Luiz Penido
5	Duque de Caxias	8	2	2	4	7	12	−5	8	
6	Friburguense	8	1	3	4	6	11	−5	6	
7	Americano	8	1	2	5	13	18	−5	5	
8	Boavista	8	1	2	5	11	17	−6	5	

Updated to match(es) played on 15 April. Source:
Rules for classification: 1 points; 2 wins; 3 goal difference; 4 goals scored; 5 red cards received; 6 yellow cards received; 7 draw

====== Matches ======
29 February 1	Vasco da Gama	2-2	Bonsucesso	Rio de Janeiro
19:30 (UTC−03:00)	Alecsandro 3' (yellow card) 70'; Felipe 59'; Fagner (yellow card) 42'	Report; Report	Diogo 63'; Marco Goiano 71'; Dieguinho (yellow card) 23'; Márcio Guerreiro (yellow card) 41'; Vinicius (yellow card) 83'; Jefferson (red card) 87'; Juninho (yellow card) 89'	Stadium: Estádio Vasco da Gama (São Januário); Attendance: 2,428; Referee: Eduardo Cordeiro Guimarães

3 March 2	Olaria	0-2	Vasco da Gama	Rio de Janeiro
16:00 (UTC−03:00)		Report; Report	Tenorio 12'; Éder Luís 26'; Fellipe Bastos (yellow card) 33'; Douglas (yellow card) 90+2'	Stadium: Estádio Proletário Guilherme da Silveira Filho (Moça Bonita); Attendance: unknown Referee: Wagner dos Santos Rosa

11 March 3	Vasco da Gama	3-0	Madureira	Rio de Janeiro
16:00 (UTC−03:00)	Juninho Pernambucano 59'; Fellipe Bastos 67'; Allan 86'	Report; Report		Stadium: Estádio Vasco da Gama (São Januário); Attendance: 5,000; Referee: Pathrice Maia

18 March 4	Botafogo	3-1	Vasco da Gama	Rio de Janeiro
18:30 (UTC−03:00)	Fellype Gabriel 34', 38', 72'; Antônio Carlos (yellow card) 42'; Márcio Azevedo (yellow card) 48'; Marcelo Mattos (yellow card) 60'	Report; Report	48' (yellow card) 84' Fellipe Bastos; (yellow card) 18' Dieyson; (yellow card) 18' Rodolfo; (yellow card) 27' Diego Souza; (yellow card) 42' Allan; (yellow card) 71' Fagner	Stadium: Estádio Olímpico João Havelange (Engenhão); Attendance: 11,941; Referee: Joao Batista de Arruda

25 March 5	Vasco da Gama	1-1	Resende	Rio de Janeiro
16:00 (UTC−03:00)	Alecsandro 81'; Renato Silva (yellow card) 21'; Felipe (yellow card) 69'	Report; Report	29' Elias; (yellow card) 33' Wellington; (yellow card) 45+1' Hiroshi; (yellow card) 63' Mauro; (yellow card) 83' Thiago Ryan; (yellow card) 84' Denílson	Stadium: Estádio Vasco da Gama (São Januário); Attendance: 6,608; Referee: Marcelo de Lima Henrique

31 March 6	Macaé	1-4	Vasco da Gama	Macaé
16:00 (UTC−03:00)	Pipico 18'; Ramon (yellow card) 17'	Report; Report	11' (yellow card) 24' Diego Souza; 15', 45+1' Juninho Pernambucano; 37' Éder Luís; (yellow card) 16' Fellipe Bastos; (yellow card) 18' Allan	Stadium: Estádio Cláudio Moacyr de Azevedo (Moacyrzão); Referee: Wagner do Nascimento Magalhães

8 April 7	Vasco da Gama	1-2	Flamengo	Rio de Janeiro
(UTC−03:00)	Diego Souza 51' (yellow card) 83' (red card); Renato Silva (yellow card) 15'; Fagner (yellow card) 56' (red card); Thiago Feltri (yellow card) 79'; Eduardo Costa (yellow card) 84' (red card); Alecsandro (yellow card) 90+1'; Rodolfo (red card); Fellipe Bastos (red card)	Report; Report	17' Deivid; 90+3' Ronaldinho; (yellow card) 33' Kléberson; (yellow card) 37' Leonardo Moura; (yellow card) 90+5' Diego Maurício	Stadium: Estádio Olímpico João Havelange (Engenhão); Attendance: 14,152; Referee: Wagner dos Santos Rosa

15 April 8	Nova Iguaçu	1-3	Vasco da Gama	Rio de Janeiro
(UTC−03:00)	Zambi 33' (pen.)	Report; Report	3' Rômulo; 40', 90+1' Alecsandro	Stadium: Estádio Proletário Guilherme da Silveira Filho (Moça Bonita); Attendance: 2,060; Referee: Rodrigo Nunes de Sá

===== Knockout stage =====
====== Matches ======
22 April Semifinal	Flamengo	2-3	Vasco da Gama	Rio de Janeiro
16:00 (UTC−03:00)	Vágner Love 3'; Kléberson 53' (yellow card) 67'; Muralha (yellow card) 32'; Felipe (yellow card) 48'; Darío Bottinelli (yellow card) 76'; Welinton (yellow card) 90+3'	Report; Report	14' Éder Luís; 41', 48' (pen.) Felipe; (yellow card) 31' Alecsandro; (yellow card) 60' Rodolfo; (yellow card) 76' Renato Silva	Stadium: Estádio Olímpico João Havelange (Engenhão); Attendance: 20,067; Referee: Marcelo de Lima Henrique

29 April Final	Vasco da Gama	1-3	Botafogo	Rio de Janeiro
16:00 (UTC−03:00)	Carlos Alberto 81'; Diego Souza (yellow card) 6'; Felipe (yellow card) 45'; Juninho Pernambucano (yellow card) 54'; Fagner (yellow card) 64'; Allan (yellow card) 65'	Report; Report	4', 45+1' Abreu; 55' Maicosuel; (yellow card) 37' Andrezinho; (yellow card) 39' Fábio Ferreira; (yellow card) 67' Fellype Gabriel; (yellow card) 85' Gabriel	Stadium: Estádio Olímpico João Havelange (Engenhão); Attendance: 41,387; Referee: Wagner do Nascimento Magalhães

=== Copa Libertadores ===
Vasco da Gama qualified to the 2012 Copa Libertadores (their 9th participation in the continental tournament) as the winner of the 2011 Copa do Brasil and were given the Brazil 3 berth as the league champion. They entered the competition in the group stage and were placed in Group 5 with Nacional (2010–11 Uruguayan champion), Alianza Lima (the Peruvian runner-up) and Libertad (the best Paraguayan non-champion and play-off winner).

==== Squad ====
As of 21 May 2012, according to combined sources on the official website.

In Conmebol competitions players must be assigned numbers between 1 and 25.

Note: Flags indicate national team as defined under FIFA eligibility rules; some limited exceptions apply. Players may hold more than one non-FIFA nationality.

No.	Pos.	Nation	Player
1	GK	BRA	Fernando Prass
2	DF	BRA	Thiago Feltri
3	DF	BRA	Dedé
4	DF	BRA	Rodolfo
5	MF	BRA	Eduardo Costa
6	MF	BRA	Felipe
7	FW	BRA	Éder Luís
8	MF	BRA	Juninho Pernambucano (captain)
9	FW	BRA	Alecsandro
10	MF	BRA	Diego Souza
11	DF	BRA	Fabrício²
12	GK	BRA	Alessandro
13	MF	BRA	Diego Rosa¹

No.	Pos.	Nation	Player
14	DF	BRA	Renato Silva
15	MF	BRA	Rômulo
16	DF	BRA	Douglas
17	MF	BRA	Allan
18	MF	ARG	Matías Abelairas
19	MF	BRA	Níton
20	MF	BRA	Carlos Alberto¹
21	MF	BRA	Fellipe Bastos
22	FW	BRA	William Barbio
23	DF	BRA	Fagner
24	MF	ARG	Leandro Chaparro
25	GK	BRA	Diogo Silva

¹ – Diego Rosa and Carlos Alberto replaced Max and Bernardo, respectively, for the round of 16.
² – Fabrício replaced Carlos Tenorio for the quarterfinals.

==== Group stage ====
===== Standings =====
Pos	Team	Pld	W	D	L	GF	GA	GD	Pts	LIB	VAS	NAC	ALI
1	(Paraguay) Libertad	6	4	1	1	11	7	+4	13		1–1	2–1	4–1
2	(Brazil) Vasco da Gama	6	4	1	1	10	6	+4	13	2–0		1–2	3–2
3	(Uruguay) Nacional	6	2	0	4	5	7	−2	6	1–2	0–1		1–0
4	(Peru) Alianza Lima	6	1	0	5	6	12	−6	3	1–2	1–2	1–0	

Legend: Blue = home team win; Yellow = draw; Red = away team win.

===== Matches =====
8 February 1st round	Vasco da Gama (Brazil)	1-2	(Uruguay) Nacional	Rio de Janeiro, Brazil
22:00 (UTC−02:00)	Alecsandro 74'; Rodolfo (yellow card) 36'; Fellipe Bastos (yellow card) 66'; Juninho Pernambucano (yellow card) 76'; Renato Silva (red card)	Report; Report; Report	30' (o.g.) Dedé; 46' Sánchez; (yellow card) 25' Placente; (yellow card) 27' Damonte; (yellow card) 89' Cabrera; (yellow card) 90+2' Viudez	Stadium: Estádio Vasco da Gama (São Januário); Attendance: 16,838; Referee: José Buitrago

6 March 2nd round	Vasco da Gama (Brazil)	3-2	(Peru) Alianza Lima	Rio de Janeiro, Brazil
21:45 (UTC−03:00)	Ramos 20' (o.g.); Dedé 60'; Juninho Pernambucano 81' (pen.)	Report; Report; Report	17' Charquero; 86' Ibáñez; (yellow card) 28' (yellow-red card) 48' Carmona; (yellow card) 68' Arroe; (yellow card) 81' Fernández	Stadium: Estádio Vasco da Gama (São Januário); Attendance: 14,327; Referee: Diego Abal

14 March 3rd round	Libertad (Paraguay)	1-1	(Brazil) Vasco da Gama	Asunción, Paraguay
22:00 (UTC−03:00)	Núñez 70' (yellow card) 13' (yellow-red card) 82'; Aquino (yellow card) 55'; Caballero (yellow card) 81'	Report; Report; Report	17' (red card) Diego Souza; (yellow card) 21' Eduardo Costa; (yellow card) 55' Wiliam Barbio; (yellow card) 83' Allan	Stadium: Estadio Dr. Nicolás Léoz; Referee: Enrique Osses

21 March 4th round	Vasco da Gama (Brazil)	2-0	(Paraguay) Libertad	Rio de Janeiro, Brazil
22:00 (UTC−03:00)	Juninho Pernambucano 54'; Alecsandro 62'; Thiago Feltri (yellow card) 31'	Report; Report; Report	(yellow card) 19' Menéndez; (yellow card) 29' Civelli; (yellow card) 78' Benegas	Stadium: Estádio Vasco da Gama (São Januário); Attendance: 15,799; Referee: Martín Vázquez

3 April 5th round	Alianza Lima (Peru)	1-2	(Brazil) Vasco da Gama	Lima, Peru
20:00 (UTC−05:00)	Curiel 77'; Rabanal (yellow card) 78'	Report; Report; Report	18', 71' Fellipe Bastos; (yellow card) 90+2' Rômulo; (red card) Nílton	Stadium: Estadio Alejandro Villanueva; Referee: Saul Laverni

12 April 6th round	Nacional (Uruguay)	0-1	(Brazil) Vasco da Gama	Montevideo, Uruguay
21:50 (UTC−03:00)	Álvarez (yellow card) 26'; Abero (yellow card) 70'; Damonte (yellow card) 77'	Report; Report; Report	57' Diego Souza; (yellow card) 78' Alecsandro	Stadium: Estadio Gran Parque Central; Referee: Pablo Lunati

==== Knockout stage ====
===== Matches =====
====== Round of 16 ======
After finishing the group stage in 2nd in Group 5, behind only Libertad, Vasco da Gama finished as the 2nd best group runner-up overall. With this, the opponent of Vasco da Gama is the Lanús (the 7th best group winner overall).

2 May 1st round	Vasco da Gama (Brazil)	2-1	(Argentina) Lanús	Rio de Janeiro, Brazil
21:50 (UTC−03:00)	Alecsandro 26'; Diego Souza 43' (yellow card) 44'; Fagner (yellow card) 9'; Juninho Pernambucano (yellow card) 89'	Report; Report; Report	63' Regueiro; (yellow card) 17' Valeri; (yellow card) 21' Velázquez; (yellow card) 58' Pizarro; (yellow card) 90+3' Fritzler	Stadium: Estádio Vasco da Gama (São Januário); Attendance: 13,017; Referee: Roberto Silvera

9 May 2nd round	Lanús (Argentina)	2-1 (4–5 p)	(Brazil) Vasco da Gama	Lanús, Argentina
22:00 (UTC−03:00)	Pavone 61' (yellow card) 28'; Gutiérrez 74'; Pizarro (yellow card) 11'; Braghieri (yellow card) 59'; Fritzler (yellow card) 84'	Report; Report; Report	19' Nílton; (yellow card) 47' Rodolfo; (yellow card) 67' Fernando Prass; (yellow card) 90+3' Thiago Feltri	Stadium: Estadio Ciudad de Lanús – Néstor Díaz Pérez (La Fortaleza); Referee: Carlos Amarilla
	Penalties
	Regueiro (penalty scored); Romero (penalty missed); Velázquez (penalty scored); Camoranesi (penalty scored); Fritzler (penalty scored)		(penalty scored) Felipe; (penalty scored) Juninho Pernambucano; (penalty scored) Carlos Alberto; (penalty scored) Renato Silva; (penalty scored) Alecsandro

====== Quarterfinal ======
After eliminated Lanús in a dramatic penalties decision, Vasco da Gama will be face Corinthians (who defeat Emelec). This confrontation marks the confrontation between the two best Brazilian teams in 2011.

16 May 1st round	Vasco da Gama (Brazil)	0-0	(Brazil) Corinthians	Rio de Janeiro, Brazil
22:00 (UTC−03:00)	Juninho Pernambucano (yellow card) 15'; Nílton (yellow card) 16'	Report; Report; Report	(yellow card) 21' Alessandro; (yellow card) 41' Jorge Henrique	Stadium: Estádio Vasco da Gama (São Januário); Attendance: 20,510; Referee: Sandro Meira Ricci

23 May 2nd round	Corinthians (Brazil)	1-0	(Brazil) Vasco da Gama	São Paulo, Brazil
22:00 (UTC−03:00)	Paulinho 88' (yellow card) 89'; Jorge Henrique (yellow card) 39'; Alessandro (yellow card) 51'; Emerson Sheik (yellow card) 56'	Report; Report; Report	(yellow card) 39' Éder Luís; (yellow card) 45+1' (yellow-red card) 90+4' Juninho Pernambucano; (yellow card) 72' Nílton; (yellow card) 75' Renato Silva	Stadium: Estádio Municipal Paulo Machado de Carvalho (Pacaembu); Attendance: 35,974 (paying); Referee: Leandro Vuaden

=== Brasileirão Série A ===
==== Standings ====
Pos	Team	Pld	W	D	L	GF	GA	GD	Pts	Qualification or relegation
3	Grêmio	38	20	11	7	56	33	+23	71	2013 Copa Libertadores First Stage
4	São Paulo	38	20	6	12	59	37	+22	66	2013 Copa Libertadores First Stage
5	Vasco da Gama	38	16	10	12	45	44	+1	58	
6	Corinthians	38	15	12	11	51	39	+12	57	2013 Copa Libertadores Second Stage (Note: Corinthians qualified for the second stage of the 2013 Copa Libertadores as the 2012 Copa Libertadores champion.)
7	Botafogo	38	15	10	13	60	50	+10	55	

Updated to match(es) played on unknown. Source: UOL.com.br
Rules for classification: 1st points; 2nd wins; 3rd goal difference; 4th goals scored; 5th head-to-head results; 6th least red cards received; 7th least yellow cards received; 8th draw

==== Matches ====
20 May Matchday 1	Vasco da Gama	2 – 1	Grêmio	Rio de Janeiro
18:30 (UTC−03:00)	Fellipe Bastos 23'; Alecsandro 69'; Renato Silva (yellow card) 54'; Juninho Pernambucano (yellow card) 80'	Report; Report	26' Fernando; (yellow card) 49' Naldo; (yellow card) 64' André Lima; (yellow card) 86' Marco Antônio	Stadium: Estádio Vasco da Gama (São Januário); Attendance: 5,826; Referee: Célio Amorim

26 May Matchday 2	Portuguesa	0 – 1	Vasco da Gama	São Paulo
18:30 (UTC−03:00)	Gustavo (yellow card) 63'; Rodriguinho (yellow card) 67'	Report; Report	22' Alecsandro; (yellow card) 19' Allan	Stadium: Estádio Oswaldo Teixeira Duarte (Canindé); Attendance: 4,638 (paying); Referee: Héber Roberto Lopes

6 June Matchday 3	Vasco da Gama	4 – 2	Náutico	Rio de Janeiro
20:30 (UTC−03:00)	Alecsandro 23', 69'; Felipe 36'; Juninho Pernambucano 62'; Rodolfo (yellow card) 57'; Nílton (yellow card) 90+1'	Report; Report	67' Martinez; 89' Araújo; (yellow card) 83' Lúcio	Stadium: Estádio São Januário; Attendance: 7,541; Referee: Wilson Seneme

10 June Matchday 4	Bahia	1 – 2	Vasco da Gama	Salvador, Bahia
16:00 (UTC−03:00)	Júnior 90+5'; Titi (yellow card) 7'; Jones (yellow card) 39'; Fahel (yellow card) 67'; Ciro (yellow card) 72'	Report; Report	8' (yellow card) 24' Juninho Pernambucano; 32' Diego Souza; (yellow card) 15' Fellipe Bastos	Stadium: Estádio Metropolitano Roberto Santos (Pituaçu); Attendance: 17,908 (paying); Referee: Anderson Daronco

17 June Matchday 5	Palmeiras	1 – 1	Vasco da Gama	São Paulo
16:00 (UTC−03:00)	Mazinho 56'; Thiago Heleno (yellow card) 33'; Juninho (yellow card) 60'; Henrique (yellow card) 62'	Report; Report	83' Juninho Pernambucano; (yellow card) 38' Nílton; (yellow card) 74' Felipe	Stadium: Arena Barueri; Attendance: 6,651 (paying); Referee: Leandro Vuaden

23 June Matchday 6	Vasco da Gama	1 – 3	Cruzeiro	Rio de Janeiro
18:30 (UTC−03:00)	Rodolfo 66'; Felipe (yellow card) 37'; Dedé (yellow card) 80'	Report; Report	41' Montillo; 64' Wellington Paulista; 81' Anselmo Ramon; (yellow card) 21' Mateus; (yellow card) 35' Willian Magrão; (yellow card) 74' Fabinho	Stadium: Estádio São Januário; Attendance: 18,337; Referee: André Luiz de Freitas Castro

30 June Matchday 7	Vasco da Gama	3 – 2	Ponte Preta	Rio de Janeiro
18:30 (UTC−03:00)	Alecsandro 21'; Éder Luís 49'; Diego Souza 77' (pen.); Fellipe Bastos (yellow card) 90'	Report; Report	17', 27' Roger; (yellow card) 32' Lucas; (yellow card) 78' Tiago Alves	Stadium: Estádio São Januário; Attendance: 11,082; Referee: Fabrício Neves Correa

8 July Matchday 8	Figueirense	1 – 1	Vasco da Gama	Florianópolis
16:00 (UTC−03:00)	Roni 74' (yellow card) 75'; Túlio (yellow card) 58'	Report; Report	22' Diego Souza; (yellow card) 45+2' Eduardo Costa	Stadium: Estádio Orlando Scarpelli; Attendance: N/A; Referee: Paulo César de Oliveira

15 July Matchday 9	Vasco da Gama	1 – 0	Atlético Goianiense	Rio de Janeiro
18:30 (UTC−03:00)	Alecsandro 14'; Wiliam Barbio (yellow card) 22'; Dedé (yellow card) 43'; Felipe (yellow card) 90+2'	Report; Report	(yellow card) 17' Marcos; (yellow card) 37' Eron; (yellow card) 65' Pituca; (yellow card) 67' Diogo Campos	Stadium: Estádio Vasco da Gama (São Januário); Attendance: 9,624; Referee: Márcio Chagas da Silva

18 July Matchday 10	São Paulo	0 – 1	Vasco da Gama	São Paulo
21:50 (UTC−03:00)	Rodrigo Caio (yellow card) 36' (yellow-red card) 58'; Rhodolfo (yellow card) 65'	Report; Report	49' Fagner	Stadium: Estádio Cícero Pompeu de Toledo (Morumbi); Attendance: 10,428 (paying); Referee: Leandro Vuaden

21 July Matchday 11	Vasco da Gama	2 – 0	Santos	Rio de Janeiro
18:30 (UTC−03:00)	Douglas 12'; Alecsandro 48'	Report; Report	(yellow card) 14' Durval; (yellow card) 90+3' Bruno Peres	Stadium: Estádio Vasco da Gama (São Januário); Attendance: 17,222; Referee: Wagner Reway

25 July Matchday 12	Vasco da Gama	1 – 0	Botafogo	Rio de Janeiro
20:30 (UTC−03:00)	Alecsandro 87'; Juninho Pernambucano (yellow card) 7'; Nílton (yellow card) 84'	Report; Report	(yellow card) 11' Lucas Zen; (yellow card) 24' Vitor Júnior; (yellow card) 90' Antônio Carlos	Stadium: Estádio Olímpico João Havelange (Engenhão); Attendance: 21,812; Referee: Wagner Nascimento Magalhães

28 July Matchday 13	Internacional	0 – 0	Vasco da Gama	Porto Alegre
18:30 (UTC−03:00)	Fred (yellow card) 66'	Report; Report	(yellow card) 45' Dedé	Stadium: Estádio José Pinheiro Borda (Beira-Rio); Attendance: 18,012; Referee: Wilson Seneme

5 August Matchday 14	Vasco da Gama	0 – 0	Corinthians	Rio de Janeiro
16:00 (UTC−03:00)	Wendel (yellow card) 64'; William Matheus (yellow card) 77'	Report; Report	(yellow card) 77' Alessandro; (yellow card) 85' Paulinho	Stadium: Estádio Vasco da Gama (São Januário); Attendance: 19,418; Referee: Paulo de Godoy Bezerra

8 August Matchday 15	Sport Recife	0 – 2	Vasco da Gama	Recife
19:30 (UTC−03:00)	Moacir (yellow card) 62'; Diego Ivo (red card); Henrique (yellow card) 89'	Report; Report	68' Juninho Pernambucano; 85' Tenorio; (yellow card) 21' Douglas; (yellow card) 77' Alecsandro	Stadium: Estádio Adelmar da Costa Carvalho (Ilha do Retiro); Attendance: 15,552 (paying); Referee: Guilherme Cereta

12 August Matchday 16	Atlético Mineiro	1 – 0	Vasco da Gama	Belo Horizonte
16:00 (UTC−03:00)	Jô 70' (yellow card) 71'; Leonardo Silva (yellow card) 83'; Escudero (yellow card) 90'	Report; Report	(yellow card) 63' Tenorio; (yellow card) 79' Juninho Pernambucano	Stadium: Estádio Raimundo Sampaio (Independência); Attendance: 19,650; Referee: Wilson Seneme

16 August Matchday 17	Vasco da Gama	2 – 2	Coritiba	Rio de Janeiro
21:00 (UTC−03:00)	Felipe 49'; Wendel 88'; Juninho Pernambucano (yellow card) 43'; Fabrício (yellow card) 44'	Report; Report	22' Júnior Urso; 90' Éverton Ribeiro; (yellow card) 47' Pereira; (yellow card) 77' Willian	Stadium: Estádio Vasco da Gama (São Januário); Attendance: N/A; Referee: Jaílson Freitas

19 August Matchday 18	Flamengo	1 – 0	Vasco da Gama	Rio de Janeiro
18:30 (UTC−03:00)	Vágner Love 38'; González (yellow card) 20'; Negueba (yellow card) 29'; Adryan (yellow card) 82'; Leonardo Moura (yellow card) 89'	Report; Report	(yellow card) 22' Felipe; (yellow card) 30' Nílton; (yellow card) 47' Carlos Alberto	Stadium: Estádio Olímpico João Havelange (Engenhão); Attendance: Marcelo de Lima Henrique; Referee: N/A

25 August Matchday 19	Vasco da Gama	1 – 2	Fluminense	Rio de Janeiro
18:30 (UTC−03:00)	Gum 73' (o.g.); Wiliam Barbio (yellow card) 41'; William Matheus (yellow card) 70'; Juninho Pernambucano (yellow card) 74'; Wendel (yellow card) 82'; Fellipe Bastos (yellow card) 90+'	Report; Report	72', 87' (yellow card) 70' Thiago Neves; (yellow card) 56' Edinho; (yellow card) 62' Jean; (yellow card) 84' Samuel; (yellow card) 89' Fred	Stadium: Estádio Olímpico João Havelange (Engenhão); Attendance: Marcelo de Lima Henrique; Referee: 13,533

29 August Matchday 20	Grêmio	2 – 0	Vasco da Gama	Porto Alegre
22:00 (UTC−03:00)	Moreno 42'; Kléber 58'; Leandro (yellow card) 79'	Report; Report	(yellow card) 20' Felipe	Stadium: Estádio Olímpico Monumental; Attendance: 17,770 (paying); Referee: Luis Flávio de Oliveira

1 September Matchday 21	Vasco da Gama	2 – 0	Portuguesa	Rio de Janeiro
21:00 (UTC−03:00)	Alecsandro 37'; Tenorio 48'; Jonas (yellow card) 68'; Dedé (yellow card) 77'; Pipico (red card)	Report; Report	(red card) Valdomiro; (yellow card) 56' Maylson	Stadium: Estádio Vasco da Gama (São Januário); Attendance: Héber Roberto Lopes; Referee: 4,636

5 September Matchday 22	Náutico	1 – 1	Vasco da Gama	Recife
19:30 (UTC−03:00)	Kieza 42'; Martinez (yellow card) 90+5'	Report; Report	53' Fellipe Bastos; (yellow card) 24' William Matheus; (yellow card) 52' Fabrício; (yellow card) 79' Alecsandro; (yellow card) 84' Wendel	Stadium: Estádio Eládio de Barros Carvalho (Aflitos); Attendance: 13,041; Referee: Leandro Vuaden

9 September Matchday 23	Vasco da Gama	0 – 4	Bahia	Rio de Janeiro
18:30 (UTC−03:00)	Douglas (yellow card) 32'; Jonas (red card) 73'	Report; Report	41', 70' Souza; 50', 58' Jones Carioca; (yellow card) 30' Fahel	Stadium: Estádio Vasco da Gama (São Januário); Attendance: 7,802; Referee: Raphael Claus

12 September Matchday 24	Vasco da Gama	3 – 1	Palmeiras	Rio de Janeiro
22:00 (UTC−03:00)	Tenorio 30'; Nílton 52' (yellow card) 77'; Juninho Pernambucano 72'; Jhon Cley (yellow card) 23'; Alecsandro (yellow card) 61'; Felipe (yellow card) 86'; Douglas (yellow card) 90'	Report; Report	24' Luan; (yellow card) 83' Wellington	Stadium: Estádio Vasco da Gama (São Januário); Attendance: 1,996 (paying); Referee: Wilton Sampaio

16 September Matchday 25	Cruzeiro	1 – 1	Vasco da Gama	Belo Horizonte
16:00 (UTC−03:00)	Renato Silva 4' (o.g.); Wellington Paulista (yellow card) 34'; Leandro Guerreiro (yellow card) 62'; Élber (yellow card) 71'; Everton (yellow card) 77'	Report; Report	28' (yellow card) 66' Nílton; (yellow card) 57' Renato Silva	Stadium: Estádio Raimundo Sampaio (Independência); Attendance: 9,753 (paying); Referee: André Luiz de Freitas Castro

23 September Matchday 26	Ponte Preta	0 – 0	Vasco da Gama	Campinas
16:00 (UTC−03:00)	Renê Junior (yellow card) 14'; Rildo (yellow card) 74'	Report; Report	(yellow card) 5' Felipe; (yellow card) 43' Jonas; (yellow card) 51' William Matheus; (yellow card) 61' Juninho Pernambucano; (yellow card) 86' Renato Silva	Stadium: Estádio Moisés Lucarelli; Attendance: 7,161; Referee: Francisco Nascimento

29 September Matchday 27	Vasco da Gama	3 – 1	Figueirense	Rio de Janeiro
18:30 (UTC−03:00)	Luan 34'; Tenorio 51'; Juninho Pernambucano 80'	Report; Report	13' Caio; (yellow card) 45+1' Raphael Botti	Stadium: Estádio Vasco da Gama (São Januário); Attendance: 5,062 (paying); Referee: Ricardo Marques

6 October Matchday 28	Atlético Goianiense	0 – 1	Vasco da Gama	Goiânia
16:00 (UTC−03:00)	Pituca (yellow card) 8'; Gustavo (yellow card) 21' (yellow-red card) 22'; Eron (yellow card) 80'; Ricardo Bueno (red card) 90+3'	Report; Report; Summary	(yellow card) 45+3' Dedé; (yellow card) 48' Carlos Alberto; (yellow card) 78' Marlone; Juninho (yellow card) 84' (goal) 87'	Stadium: Estádio Serra Dourada; Attendance: 13,212 (paying); Referee: Raphael Claus

10 October Matchday 29	Vasco da Gama	0 – 2	São Paulo	Rio de Janeiro
22:00 (UTC−03:00)	Nílton 68'; Rodolfo (yellow card) 70'	Report; Report	21' Luís Fabiano; 49' Osvaldo; (yellow card) 54' Toloi	Stadium: Estádio Vasco da Gama (São Januário); Attendance: 11,182; Referee: Elmo Resende

14 October Matchday 30	Santos	2 – 0	Vasco da Gama	Santos
16:00 (UTC−03:00)	Miralles 9', 47'; Henrique (yellow card) 33'; Rafael Cabral (yellow card) 86'	Report; Report	(yellow card) 43' Nílton; (yellow card) 90' Fellipe Bastos	Stadium: Estádio Urbano Caldeira (Vila Belmiro); Attendance: 6,555 (paying); Referee: Wilton Pereira Sampaio

18 October Matchday 31	Botafogo	3 – 2	Vasco da Gama	Rio de Janeiro
21:00 (UTC−03:00)	Elkeson 30' (yellow card) 40'; Bruno Mendes 75', 90+3'; Márcio Azevedo (yellow card) 43'; Seedorf (yellow card) 86'	Report; Report	25', 38' Carlos Alberto; (yellow card) 72' Wendel	Stadium: Estádio Olímpico João Havelange (Engenhão); Attendance: 7,525; Referee: Rodrigo Nunes de Sá

24 October Matchday 32	Vasco da Gama	1 – 2	Internacional	Rio de Janeiro
20:30 (UTC−02:00)	Jonas 23'	Report; Report	34', 45+1' Forlán; (yellow card) 31' Ygor; (yellow card) 73' Guiñazú	Stadium: Estádio Vasco da Gama (São Januário); Attendance: 10,744; Referee: Héber Roberto Lopes

27 October Matchday 33	Corinthians	1 – 0	Vasco da Gama	São Paulo
16:00 (UTC−02:00)	Guerrero (yellow card) 45+4', (goal) 59'; Chicão (yellow card) 84'	Report; Report	(yellow card) 33' Éder Luís; (yellow card) 84' Carlos Alberto	Stadium: Estádio Municipal Paulo Machado de Carvalho (Pacaembu); Attendance: 26,845; Referee: Leandro Pedro Vuaden

4 November Matchday 34	Vasco da Gama	0 – 3	Sport Recife	Rio de Janeiro
17:00 (UTC−02:00)	Nílton 59'; Felipe (yellow card) 70'; Douglas (yellow card) 85'; Fellipe Bastos (yellow card) 90+1'	Report; Report	40' Felipe Azevedo; 54' Hugo; 87' Henrique	Stadium: Estádio Vasco da Gama (São Januário); Attendance: 6,569; Referee: Márcio Chagas da Silva

11 November Matchday 35	Vasco da Gama	1 – 1	Atlético Mineiro	Rio de Janeiro
17:00 (UTC−02:00)	Alecsandro 56'; Wendel (yellow card) 64'; Eduardo Costa (yellow card) 67'; Juninho Pernambucano (yellow card) 77'; Douglas (red card); Felipe (yellow card) 90+1'	Report; Report	27' (pen.) Ronaldinho; Marcos Rocha (yellow card) 37'; Serginho (red card)	Stadium: Estádio Vasco da Gama (São Januário); Attendance: ELmo Alves Resende; Referee: 7,036

17 November Matchday 36	Coritiba	1 – 2	Vasco da Gama	Curitiba
19:30 (UTC−02:00)	Lincoln 10'; Gil (yellow card) 56'; Escudero (yellow card) 78'; Emerson Santos (yellow card) 86'	Report; Report	23' Romário; 58' Nílton; (yellow card) 30' Fabrício; (yellow card) 35' Wendel; (yellow card) 74' Jonas	Stadium: Estádio Major Antônio Couto Pereira; Attendance: 10,545; Referee: Paulo César de Oliveira

24 November Matchday 37	Vasco da Gama	1 – 1	Flamengo	Rio de Janeiro
19:30 (UTC−02:00)	Nílton 34' (yellow card) 9'; Tenorio (yellow card) 9'; Jonas (yellow card) 48'; Abuda (yellow card) 58'; Fellipe Bastos (yellow card) 77'; Fernando Prass (yellow card) 83'; Douglas (yellow card) 86'	Report; Report	87' González; (yellow card) 20' Ramon; (yellow card) 24' Wellington Silva	Stadium: Estádio Olímpico João Havelange (Engenhão); Attendance: 9,416; Referee: Wagner Magalhaes

2 December Matchday 38	Fluminense	1 – 2	Vasco da Gama	Rio de Janeiro
17:00 (UTC−02:00)	Thiago Carleto 86' (pen.) (yellow card) 45'	Report; Report	71', 80' Éder Luís; (yellow card) 20' Abuda; (yellow card) 26' Renato Silva; (yellow card) 50' Auremir; (yellow card) 85' Douglas	Stadium: Estádio Olímpico João Havelange (Engenhão); Attendance: 8,779; Referee: Grazziani Rocha

==== Brasileirão Série A results by round ====
Round	1	2	3	4	5	6	7	8	9	10	11	12	13	14	15	16	17	18	19	20	21	22	23	24	25	26	27	28	29	30	31	32	33	34	35	36	37	38
Ground	H	A	H	A	A	H	H	A	H	A	H	H	A	H	A	A	H	A	H	A	H	A	H	H	A	A	H	A	H	A	A	H	A	H	H	A	H	A
Result	W	W	W	W	D	L	W	D	W	W	W	W	D	D	W	L	D	L	L	L	W	D	L	W	D	D	W	W	L	L	L	L	L	L	D	W	D	W
Position	3	2	1	1	1	3	2	3	2	2	2	2	2	2	2	3	3	3	4	4	4	4	4	4	4	4	4	4	4	5	5	5	7	7	7	7	6	5

Updated to match(es) played on 2 December 2012. Source: Matches
A = Away; H = Home; W = Win; D = Draw; L = Loss

== Honors ==
=== Individuals ===
Name	Number	Country	Award	Category	Result
Fagner	23	(Brazil)	2012 Campeonato Carioca	best Right (wing) back	Won
Dedé	26	(Brazil)	2012 Campeonato Carioca	best Right Centre back	Won
			2012 Campeonato Carioca	MVP (by fans)	Won
			The Greatest Brazilian	Greatest Brazilian of All Time	Nominated
Thiago Feltri	2	(Brazil)	2012 Campeonato Carioca	best Left (wing) back	Nominated
Rômulo	37	(Brazil)	2012 Campeonato Carioca	best Defensive midfielder	Won
Juninho Pernambucano	8	(Brazil)	2012 Campeonato Carioca	best Center and Attacking midfielder	Nominated
Felipe	6	(Brazil)	2012 Campeonato Carioca	best Side and Attacking midfielder	Won
Alecsandro	9	(Brazil)	2012 Campeonato Carioca	best Centre forward and Striker	Won

Name	Number	Country	Award
Dedé	26	(Brazil)	Named for Brazil national team in the friendlies v. Bosnia and Herzegovina, South Africa and China
Rômulo	37	(Brazil)	Named for Brazil national team in the friendlies v. Denmark, United States, Mexico and Argentina; Named for Brazil U-23 national team in 2012 Summer Olympics
Alecsandro	9	(Brazil)	2012 Campeonato Carioca Top Goal Scorer

== IFFHS ranking ==
Vasco da Gama position on the Club World Ranking during the 2012 season, according to IFFHS.

Month	Position	Points
January	27	184,0
February	24	184,0
March	13	219,0
April	9	235,0
May	16	207,0
June	11	226,0
July	12	228,0
August	19	208,0
September	17	208,0
October		
November		
December		

Last updated: 2012-10-02.
Source: IFFHS

== See also ==
- 2012 Rio de Janeiro State Championship
- 2012 Brasileirão Série A
- 2012 Copa Libertadores
