= Thiago Feltri =

Brazilian footballer

Personal information
- Full name: Thiago Henrique Feltri
- Date of birth: 18 May 1985 (age 41)
- Place of birth: Fernão, Brazil
- Height: 1.74 m (5 ft 9 in)
- Position: Left back

Youth career
- 2003–2005: Atlético Mineiro

Senior career*
Years	Team	Apps	(Gls)
2005–2009	Atlético Mineiro	84	(2)
2008	→ Goiás (loan)	18	(1)
2010–2011	Atlético Goianiense	60	(3)
2012–2013	Vasco da Gama	12	(0)
2013	Joinville	8	(0)
2014	Atlético Goianiense	18	(0)
2015	Bragantino	0	(0)
2016	Tigres do Brasil	5	(0)
2017	Portuguesa	22	(0)
2019	Linense	5	(0)
- * Club domestic league appearances and goals

Thiago Henrique Feltri (born 18 May 1985 in Fernão), known as Thiago Feltri, is a Brazilian retired footballer who played as a left back.

== Career ==
On 4 January 2010 Atlético Mineiro released the left-back after five years and is now a free agent. In February 2010 Atletico Goianiense signed the former Atlético Mineiro and Goiás left-back until December 2011.

== Honours ==
Atlético Mineiro

- Campeonato Brasileiro Série B: 2006
- Campeonato Mineiro: 2007
