= Marquinhos Moraes =

Brazilian footballer

Personal information
- Full name: Marcos dos Santos Moraes
- Date of birth: 21 June 1991 (age 35)
- Place of birth: Brazil
- Height: 1.75 m (5 ft 9 in)
- Position: Attacking midfielder

Youth career
- 2007–2008: Portuguesa Santista
- 2009–2010: Portuguesa
- 2010–2011: Vasco da Gama

Senior career*
Years	Team	Apps	(Gls)
2012–2013	Vasco da Gama		
2012	→ America (RJ) (loan)		
2012–2013	→ Gloria Progresul Bistrița (loan)	9	(1)
2014	Paulista		
2014	Juventus da Mooca		
2014–	Persija		
- * Club domestic league appearances and goals as of 30 June 2013

Marcos dos Santos Moraes (born 21 January 1991), commonly known as Marquinhos, Markinhos or even Markisio, is a Brazilian footballer who plays as an attacking midfielder for Lebanese club Riada Wal Adab.

== Club chronology ==
- Vasco da Gama – from October 2010 to September 2013
- America (RJ) (loan from Vasco da Gama) – from December 2011 to April 2012
- Gloria Progresul Bistrița (loan from Vasco da Gama) – from May 2012 to June 2013
- Paulista – from November 2013 to 1 February 2014
- Juventus da Mooca – from 1 February 2014 to 25 June 2014
