= Maicon Assis =

Brazilian footballer (born 1990)

Personal information
- Full name: Maicon Assis Brito
- Date of birth: 3 March 1990 (age 36)
- Place of birth: Bento Gonçalves, Brazil
- Height: 1.76 m (5 ft 9 1/2 in)
- Positions: Attacking midfielder; second striker

Youth career
- 2004–2007: Grêmio
- 2008: Internacional
- 2008: Cruzeiro
- 2009–2010: Vasco da Gama

Senior career*
Years	Team	Apps	(Gls)
2011–2013	Vasco da Gama	3	(0)
2011	→ Portuguesa (RJ) (loan)	18	(4)
2011	→ Vasco da Gama Sines (loan)	2	(1)
2011	→ Arapongas (loan)	2	(0)
2013	→ Veranópolis (loan)	5	(0)
2013–2014	Trofense	19	(2)
2015–2019	Portuguesa (RJ)	91	(18)
2017	→ Portuguesa (loan)	8	(0)
2018	→ Santa Cruz (loan)	2	(0)
2018	→ Brasil de Pelotas (loan)	7	(1)
2019–2020	Brasil de Pelotas	20	(1)
- * Club domestic league appearances and goals as of 15:10, 14 June 2019 (UTC)

Maicon Assis Brito (born 3 March 1990), commonly known as Maicon Assis, is a Brazilian footballer who plays as a midfielder or forward.

== Career ==
Maicon Assis signed for Brasil de Pelotas after being release by Portuguesa (RJ) in March 2019. He had previously had a loan spell with the club in 2018.

Maicon Assis has played in all four national division of Brazilian football, representing Vasco da Gama in 2012 Campeonato Brasileiro Série A, Brasil de Pelotas in 2018 Campeonato Brasileiro Série B, Santa Cruz in 2018 Campeonato Brasileiro Série C and both Portuguesa (RJ) and Arapongas in Campeonato Brasileiro Série D. He has also had spells in Portugal with Vasco da Gama's partnership side in 2011 and with Trofense in 2013–14.
