= Renato Silva =

Brazilian footballer

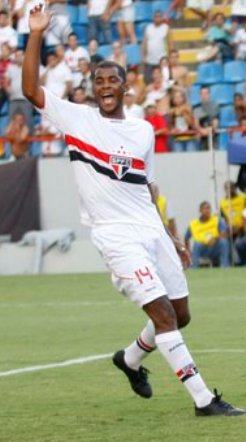
- Renato playing for São Paulo

Personal information
- Full name: Renato Assis da Silva
- Date of birth: 26 July 1983 (age 43)
- Place of birth: Colinas do Tocantins, Brazil
- Height: 1.83 m (6 ft 0 in)
- Position: Centre back

Youth career
- 2001: Goiás

Senior career*
Years	Team	Apps	(Gls)
2002–2004	Goiás	78	(13)
2004–2005	Belenenses	15	(2)
2005–2006	Flamengo	77	(3)
2007	Fluminense	24	(3)
2007–2008	Botafogo	100	(9)
2009–2011	São Paulo	79	(2)
2011–2012	Shandong Luneng	20	(2)
2011–2014	Vasco da Gama	92	(1)
2014–2015	Santa Cruz	0	(0)
2015	Metropolitano	2	(0)
2016	Brasiliense	1	(0)
2017	Boavista	4	(0)
2019	Perilima	0	(0)
- * Club domestic league appearances and goals

Renato Assis da Silva (born 26 July 1983) is a Brazilian former professional footballer who played as a central defender.

== Career ==
Silva was born in Colinas do Tocantins, On 22 January 2011, he moved from São Paulo to Shandong Luneng.

On 4 July 2011, he moved on loan to Vasco da Gama from Shandong Luneng.

== Honours ==
Flamengo

- Copa do Brasil: 2006

Fluminense

- Copa do Brasil: 2007
