= Jonas (footballer, born 1987) =

Brazilian footballer

Personal information
- Full name: Jonas Jessue da Silva Júnior
- Date of birth: 10 February 1987 (age 39)
- Place of birth: Votuporanga, Brazil
- Height: 1.81 m (5 ft 11 in)
- Position: Right back

Youth career
- 2003: Mirassol

Senior career*
Years	Team	Apps	(Gls)
2004–2007	São Caetano	6	(0)
2007–2011	Internacional	16	(0)
2009	→ Sport Recife (loan)	3	(0)
2010	→ Botafogo-SP (loan)	0	(0)
2010	→ Vitória (loan)	13	(1)
2011–2012	Coritiba	39	(1)
2012–2013	Vasco da Gama	16	(1)
2013–2014	Atlético Paranaense	14	(0)
2014	Avaí	0	(0)
2014–2015	Atlético Goianiense	25	(0)
2015	Red Bull Brasil	0	(0)
2015	Criciúma	8	(0)
2016	América Mineiro	18	(3)
2017	Botafogo	0	(0)
2018	Joinville	10	(0)
2019	Ituano	0	(0)
2019	Cuiabá	13	(0)
2020	Ituano	0	(0)
- * Club domestic league appearances and goals as of 19:42, 23 July 2020 (UTC)

Jonas Jessue da Silva Júnior (born 10 February 1987), simply known as Jonas, is a Brazilian footballer who plays as a right back.

== Honours ==
Internacional

Campeonato Gaúcho: 2008

Sport

Campeonato Pernambucano: 2009

Coritiba

- Campeonato Paranaense: 2011, 2012
