= Eduardo Costa =

Brazilian footballer (born 1982)

Personal information
- Full name: Eduardo Nascimento Costa
- Date of birth: 23 September 1982 (age 44)
- Place of birth: Florianópolis, Brazil
- Position: Defensive midfielder

Team information
- Current team: Atlético Catarinense (head coach)

Senior career*
Years	Team	Apps	(Gls)
2000–2001	Grêmio	17	(1)
2001–2004	Bordeaux	110	(5)
2004–2005	Marseille	30	(1)
2005–2008	Espanyol	65	(1)
2007–2008	→ Grêmio (loan)	23	(0)
2009	São Paulo	18	(0)
2009–2010	Monaco	16	(2)
2011–2012	Vasco da Gama	63	(1)
2013–2015	Avaí	84	(6)
Total		424	(17)

International career
2001–2002	Brazil	7	(0)

Managerial career
- 2019: Lajeadense
- 2020: Metropolitano
- 2023–: Atlético Catarinense
- * Club domestic league appearances and goals

Eduardo Nascimento Costa (born 23 September 1982), known as Eduardo Costa, is a Brazilian professional football coach and former player who played as a defensive midfielder. He is the current head coach of Atlético Catarinense.

== Career ==
Eduardo was born in Florianópolis, Brazil. In 2007 he played for Grêmio on loan from RCD Espanyol. He was especially noted for being an extremely tight marker, and is booked with alarming regularity

A member of Brazil's Under 17 World Cup winning side, he came to France in 2001 to play for FC Girondins de Bordeaux, where he commanded a regular first team spot for three seasons, including playing a key role in Bordeaux's UEFA Cup run during the 2002–03 season. He followed that with a move to Olympique de Marseille, but after an unhappy year there, he was signed by Espanyol in 2005 for €4 million in four-year contract. He did not play in 2008–09 Ligue 1, as he would occupied a non-EU quota. In January 2009 he left for São Paulo in three-year contract.

On 8 August 2009, he signed with AS Monaco FC on a three-year deal.

In December 2010, Eduardo Costa was loaned to Vasco da Gama for six months. Six months after it became a permanent deal following Monaco's relegation from the Ligue 1.

== Honours ==
=== Club ===
Grêmio

- Copa do Brasil (Brazilian Cup): 2001
- Campeonato Gaúcho: 2001

Bordeaux

- Coupe de la Ligue (French League Cup): 2002

Espanyol

- Copa del Rey (Spanish League Cup): 2006

Vasco da Gama

- Copa do Brasil (Brazilian Cup): 2011

=== International ===
Brazil

- FIFA U-17 World Cup: 1997
