= Dieyson =

Brazilian footballer (born 1993)

Personal information
- Full name: Dieyson Anjos da Silva
- Date of birth: 30 June 1993 (age 33)
- Place of birth: Itacurubi, Brazil
- Height: 1.76 m (5 ft 9 1/2 in)
- Position: Left back

Team information
- Current team: Manaus

Youth career
- Vasco da Gama

Senior career*
Years	Team	Apps	(Gls)
2012–2014	Vasco da Gama	3	(0)
2014	→ Caxias (loan)	2	(0)
2015	Icasa	0	(0)
2015	Portuguesa	11	(0)
2016–2017	Resende	11	(0)
2017	Tombense	5	(0)
2018	Resende	3	(0)
2018	→ Bonsucesso (loan)		
2019–2020	Bangu	24	(0)
2019	→ Bonsucesso (loan)		
2020	ABC	15	(0)
2021	Água Santa	5	(0)
2022	Altos	29	(0)
2023	Camboriú	9	(0)
2023–	Manaus	3	(0)
- * Club domestic league appearances and goals as of 14 May 2023

Dieyson Anjos da Silva (born 30 June 1993), simply known as Dieyson, is a Brazilian footballer who plays for Manaus as a left back.

== Club career ==
Born in Itacurubi, Rio Grande do Sul, Dieyson finished his formation with Vasco. After making his debut against Olaria on 3 March 2012, he was promoted to the main squad on the following day.

On 20 May 2012 Dieyson made his Série A debut, starting in a 2–1 home win against Grêmio. After being rarely used by the club, he was loaned to Caxias on 13 January 2014.

On 17 July 2014 Dieyson returned to Vasco, but was subsequently released. Ahead of the 2015 campaign he joined Icasa, and after being regularly used in the year's Campeonato Cearense, moved to Portuguesa.
