= Leandro Chaparro =

Argentine footballer

Personal information
- Full name: Leandro Nery Chaparro
- Date of birth: January 7, 1991 (age 35)
- Place of birth: La Tablada, Argentina
- Height: 1.73 m (5 ft 8 in)
- Position: Midfielder

Team information
- Current team: Centro Español

Youth career
- 2008–2009: San Lorenzo

Senior career*
Years	Team	Apps	(Gls)
2009–2010	San Lorenzo	1	(0)
2011–2012	Vasco da Gama	11	(0)
2013	Madureira	6	(0)
2013	→ Sportivo Belgrano (loan)	10	(0)
2014–2015	Beira-Mar	30	(6)
2015–2016	Estoril	20	(0)
2016–2017	Freamunde	13	(1)
2018	Uberlândia	0	(0)
2018	Oliveirense	4	(0)
2018–	Centro Español		

International career
- Argentina U-18
2011	Argentina U-20	0	(0)
- * Club domestic league appearances and goals as of February 22, 2018

Leandro Nery Chaparro, better known as Leandro Chaparro (born January 7, 1991), is an Argentine footballer who plays as a midfielder for Centro Español.

== Career ==
Born in La Tablada, Leandro Chaparro started his professional career in 2009, playing for San Lorenzo. He played a single Argentine Primera División game for the club, on September 26, 2009, when his club beat Tigre 3–2 at Estadio Coliseo de Victoria, home of the opposing team. Leandro Chaparro was transferred to Série A club Vasco da Gama of Brazil on February 15, 2011. He was signed by Vasco da Gama in February 2011, after some impressive displays for Argentina U-20.

=== National team ===
Leandro Chaparro was called up and played for the Argentina national under-18 team, and for the Argentina national under-20 team.

=== Career statistics ===
(Correct as of June 7, 2011)

Club	Season	State League			Brazilian Série A			Copa do Brasil			Copa Libertadores			Copa Sudamericana			Total		
Club	Season	Apps	Goals	Assists	Apps	Goals	Assists	Apps	Goals	Assists	Apps	Goals	Assists	Apps	Goals	Assists	Apps	Goals	Assists
Vasco da Gama (loan)	2011	0	0	0	3	0	1	0	0	0	-	-	-	0	0	0	3	0	1
Total		0	0	0	3	0	1	0	0	0	-	-	-	0	0	0	3	0	1
Career total		0	0	0	3	0	1	0	0	0	-	-	-	0	0	0	3	0	1

=== International statistics ===
As of May 30, 2011.

National team	Club	Season	Apps	Goals
Argentina U-20	San Lorenzo	2011	0	0
Total			0	0
