= Lucas Abreu =

Brazilian footballer (born 1988)

Personal information
- Full name: Dirceu Lucas de Abreu Santos
- Date of birth: 25 February 1988 (age 38)
- Place of birth: Curvelo, Brazil
- Height: 1.82 m (6 ft 0 in)
- Position: Defensive midfielder

Team information
- Current team: Paraná

Youth career
- Poços de Caldas

Senior career*
Years	Team	Apps	(Gls)
2009–2010	Poços de Caldas		
2011–2012	Ponte Preta	21	(1)
2013	Mirassol	0	(0)
2014	Pelotas	8	(2)
2014–2018	Juventude	113	(7)
2019	CRB	38	(0)
2020	Guarani	19	(1)
2021–	Paraná	2	(0)
- * Club domestic league appearances and goals

Dirceu Lucas de Abreu Santos (born 25 February 1988), known as Lucas Abreu, is Brazilian footballer who plays for Paraná.

== Biography ==
Born in Curvelo, Minas Gerais, Lucas started his career at Poços de Caldas of Campeonato Mineiro Módulo II. He signed a 3-year contract in January 2009. In July 2010, Gimnàstic announced the player was trailing at the club. After failing to secure a contract, he left for Ponte Preta in January 2011. on a 4 1/2-month contract.
