= Fabinho (footballer, born 1983) =

Brazilian footballer

Personal information
- Full name: Fabio Souza dos Santos
- Date of birth: September 7, 1983 (age 43)
- Place of birth: Recife, Brazil
- Height: 1.63 m (5 ft 4 in)
- Position: Forward

Team information
- Current team: Juventus SC

Youth career
- 2000–2005: Olimpia

Senior career*
Years	Team	Apps	(Gls)
2005–2007	Olimpia	33	(10)
2007–2008	Mirassol	20	(3)
2008–2009	Botafogo-SP	15	(3)
2009–2010	Guarani	37	(7)
2010–2011	Portuguesa	18	(2)
2011–2012	Guarani	32	(12)
2012–2013	Cruzeiro	15	(0)
2013	→ Criciúma (loan)	45	(5)
2014	Guarani	7	(0)
2014–2015	Joinville	25	(6)
2015–2016	Ceará	25	(1)
2016	XV de Piracicaba	14	(4)
2016	Vila Nova	31	(7)
2017	Londrina	6	(1)
2017–2018	ABC	9	(0)
2018	XV de Piracicaba	0	(0)
2018	União Luziense	0	(0)
2019	Castanhal	0	(0)
2019	Almirante Barroso	0	(0)
2020–	Juventus SC	0	(0)
- * Club domestic league appearances and goals as of 4 June 2020

Fabio Souza dos Santos (born September 7, 1983, in Recife), or simply Fabinho, is a forward player from Brazil who plays for Juventus SC.

== Career ==
On 29 November 2017, Fabinho left ABC to join XV de Piracicaba.

== Honours ==
Joinville

- Brazilian Série B: 2014
