= Nílton (footballer, born April 1987) =

Brazilian footballer

Nilton
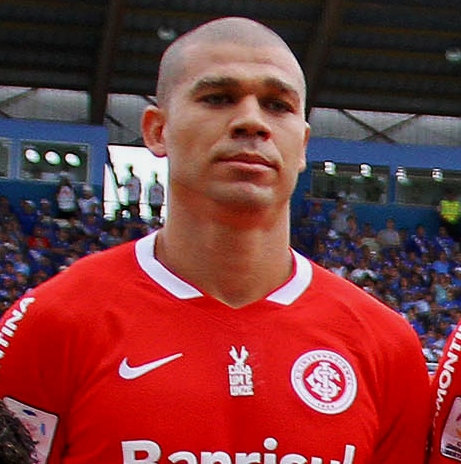

Personal information
- Full name: Nilton Ferreira Júnior
- Date of birth: 21 April 1987 (age 39)
- Place of birth: Barra do Garças, Brazil
- Height: 1.85 m (6 ft 1 in)
- Position: Defensive midfielder

Youth career
- 1998–2000: Etti Jundiaí
- 2000–2007: Corinthians
- 2005: → Mauaense (loan)

Senior career*
Years	Team	Apps	(Gls)
2005–2008	Corinthians	26	(2)
2006	→ Bragantino (loan)	0	(0)
2009–2012	Vasco da Gama	148	(16)
2013–2014	Cruzeiro	91	(11)
2015–2016	Internacional	43	(2)
2016–2017	Vissel Kobe	47	(5)
2018–2019	Bahia	28	(2)
2019	CSA	12	(1)
2020	Oeste	3	(0)
2021	Real Tomayapo	3	(1)
- * Club domestic league appearances and goals

Nílton Ferreira Júnior (born 21 April 1987), simply known as Nílton, is a Brazilian former footballer who played as a defensive midfielder.

Nílton has also been capped for Brazil at Under-20 level.

== Career statistics ==
=== Club career ===
Updated to 23 February 2017.

In May 2019, he joined CSA.

Club performance			League		Cup		League Cup		Continental		Total	
Season	Club	League	Apps	Goals	Apps	Goals	Apps	Goals	Apps	Goals	Apps	Goals
Brazil			League		Copa do Brasil		League Cup		South America		Total	
2009	Vasco da Gama	Série B	31	2	4	1	9	1	—	—	44	4
2010	Vasco da Gama	Série A	22	3	5	0	12	3	—	—	51	6
2011	Vasco da Gama	Série A	7	0					4	0	11	0
2012	Vasco da Gama	Série A	34	4			13	0	7	1	54	5
Total	Vasco da Gama		94	9	9	1	34	4	11	1	160	15
2013	Cruzeiro	Série A	30	7	6	1	14	0			50	8
2014	Cruzeiro	Série A	26	3	5	0	7	0	3	0	41	3
Total	Cruzeiro		56	10	11	1	21	0	3	0	91	11
Japan			League		Emperor's Cup		J.League Cup		AFC		Total	
2016	Vissel Kobe	J1 League	13	2	2	0	2	0	–		17	2
Total	Vissel Kobe		13	2	2	0	2	0	–		17	2
Career total			163	21	22	2	57	4	14	1	268	28

== Honours ==
=== Club ===
Corinthians

- Campeonato Brasileiro Série A: 2005
- Campeonato Brasileiro Série B: 2008

Vasco da Gama

- Campeonato Brasileiro Série B: 2009
- Copa do Brasil: 2011

Cruzeiro

- Campeonato Brasileiro Série A: 2013, 2014
- Campeonato Mineiro: 2014

International

- Campeonato Gaúcho: 2015

Bahia

- Campeonato Baiano: 2018, 2019

=== Individual ===
- Campeonato Brasileiro Série A Team of the Year: 2013
