= Eron (footballer, born 1992) =

Brazilian footballer

Personal information
- Full name: Eron Santos Lourenço
- Date of birth: 17 January 1992 (age 34)
- Place of birth: Belo Horizonte, Brazil
- Height: 1.72 m (5 ft 7 1/2 in)
- Position: Left back

Youth career
- 2005–2010: Atlético Mineiro

Senior career*
Years	Team	Apps	(Gls)
2010–2017	Atlético Mineiro	18	(0)
2012	→ Atlético Goianiense (loan)	26	(1)
2013	→ Goiás (loan)	6	(0)
2015	→ Ceará (loan)	2	(0)
2015	→ Atlético Goianiense (loan)	15	(0)
2016	→ Bragantino (loan)	4	(0)
2017	Guarani	2	(0)
2019	Villa Nova	4	(0)
- * Club domestic league appearances and goals as of 23:13, 7 April 2024

Eron Santos Lourenço (born 17 January 1992), better known as Eron, is a Brazilian football player who plays as a left back.

== Career ==
=== Atlético Mineiro ===
The athlete arrived at the club in 2005 and during this period, was summoned to the selections under-15 and U-16. Eron made his league debut against Flamengo on 27 August 2010.

=== First spell at Atlético Goianiense ===
Eron made his league debut against Coritiba on 17 June 2012. He scored his first goal for the club against Palmeiras on 19 August 2012, scoring in the 19th minute.

=== Goiás ===
Eron made his league debut against Anápolis on 18 March 2013.

=== Ceará ===
Eron made his league debut against Paraná on 9 May 2015.

=== Second spell at Atlético Goianiense ===
Eron made his league debut against Bragantino on 25 July 2015.

=== Bragantino ===
Eron made his league debut against União Barbarense on 9 March 2016.

=== Guarani ===
Eron made his league debut against Santa Cruz on 20 May 2017.

=== Villa Nova ===
Eron made his league debut against América Mineiro on 24 January 2019.

=== Career statistics ===
(Correct as of 16 October 2010)

Club	Season	State League		Brazilian Série A		Copa do Brasil		Copa Sudamericana		Total	
Club	Season	Apps	Goals	Apps	Goals	Apps	Goals	Apps	Goals	Apps	Goals
Atlético Mineiro	2010	-	-	10	0	-	-	-	-	10	0
Total		-	-	10	0	-	-	-	-	10	0
