= Auremir =

Brazilian footballer (born 1991)

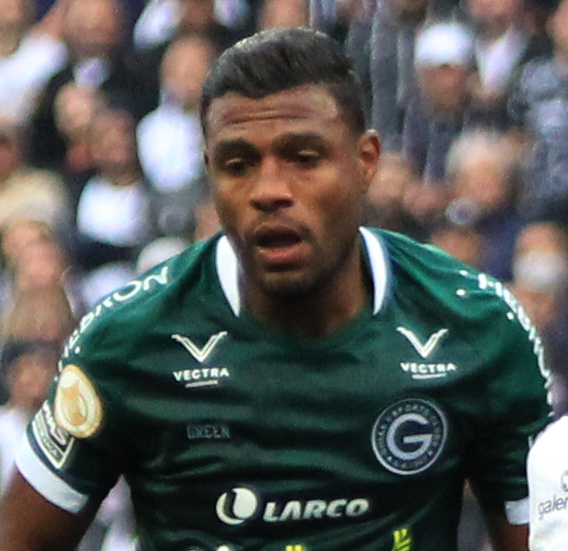
- Auremir with Goiás

Personal information
- Full name: Auremir Evangelista dos Santos
- Date of birth: 10 September 1991 (age 35)
- Place of birth: Recife, Brazil
- Height: 1.74 m (5 ft 9 in)
- Position: Defensive midfielder

Team information
- Current team: Náutico
- Number: 5

Youth career
- Náutico

Senior career*
Years	Team	Apps	(Gls)
2010–2014	Náutico	65	(1)
2011	→ Botafogo-PB (loan)	6	(0)
2012	→ Vasco da Gama (loan)	15	(0)
2014	Paraná	5	(0)
2015	Fortaleza	32	(1)
2016	Sampaio Corrêa	7	(0)
2016–2017	Guarani	54	(2)
2017–2018	Sivasspor	31	(0)
2018–2019	Erzurumspor	14	(0)
2019	Ceará	10	(0)
2020–2021	Cuiabá	68	(1)
2022	Goiás	38	(1)
2023–2024	CRB	24	(1)
2024	→ Chapecoense (loan)	29	(0)
2025–	Náutico	36	(1)
- * Club domestic league appearances and goals as of 18 November 2026

Auremir Evangelista dos Santos (10 September 1991) is a Brazilian professional footballer who plays for Náutico. Mainly a defensive midfielder, he can also play as a right back.

== Honours ==
Fortaleza

- Campeonato Cearense: 2015

Cuiabá

- Campeonato Mato-Grossense: 2021

Individual

- Campeonato Pernambucano Best Newcomer: 2011
