= 2013 CR Vasco da Gama season =

Vasco da Gama
2013 season
- President: Roberto Dinamite
- Head Coach: Adílson since 29 October (Dorival Júnior since 10 July until 28 October) (Paulo Autuori since 21 March until 9 July) (Gaúcho until 20 March)
- Stadium: São Januário; Maracanã
- Brasileirão Série A: 18th place (relegated)
- Copa do Brasil: Quarterfinals
- Rio de Janeiro State Championship: 4th Guanabara Tournament: Runners-up; Rio de Janeiro Tournament: Group stage
- Top goalscorer: League: André (12); All: André (12)
Home colours	Away colours	Third colours

The 2013 season was Club de Regatas Vasco da Gama's 115th year in existence, the club's 98th season in existence of football, and the club's 42nd season playing in the Brasileirão Série A, the top flight of Brazilian football.

The club could not play in the Copa Sudamericana due to fixture conflicts with the Copa do Brasil.

== Players ==
=== Current squad ===
Note: Flags indicate national team as defined under FIFA eligibility rules; some limited exceptions apply. Players may hold more than one non-FIFA nationality. Squad correct as of 19 August 2013.

No.	Pos.	Nation	Player
1	GK	BRA	Michel Alves
4	DF	BRA	Nei
5	MF	ARG	Pablo Guiñazú
6	DF	PER	Yoshimar Yotún (on loan from Sporting Cristal)
8	MF	BRA	Juninho Pernambucano (captain)
9	FW	BRA	André (on loan from Atlético Mineiro)
10	MF	BRA	Pedro Ken (on loan from Cruzeiro)
11	FW	ECU	Carlos Tenorio
12	GK	BRA	Alessandro
13	DF	BRA	Cris
14	DF	BRA	Luan (youth player)
15	MF	BRA	Fillipe Soutto (on loan from Atlético Mineiro)
16	MF	BRA	Francismar (on loan from Boa)
17	MF	BRA	Wendel
18	DF	BRA	Rafael Vaz
19	FW	BRA	Edmilson
20	MF	COL	Santiago Montoya
22	MF	BRA	Abuda
23	DF	BRA	Fagner (on loan from Wolfsburg)
25	GK	BRA	Diogo Silva
28	DF	BRA	Jomar
29	MF	BRA	Jhon Cley (youth player)
30	MF	BRA	Marlone
31	MF	BRA	Bernardo
33	DF	BRA	Renato Silva
35	MF	BRA	Baiano
37	DF	BRA	Henrique (youth player)
39	FW	BRA	Thalles (youth player)
41	FW	BRA	Robinho
84	MF	BRA	Sandro Silva (footballer)
87	MF	BRA	Dakson
91	FW	BRA	Reginaldo
93	FW	BRA	Willie (on loan from Vitória)
—	DF	BRA	Rodolfo

=== Squad information ===
As of 31 July 2013.

No.	Name	Nationality	Position (s)	Date of birth (age)	Signed from
Goalkeepers
1	Michel Alves	(Brazil)	GK	25 March 1981 (aged 32)	(Brazil) Criciúma
12	Alessandro	(Brazil)	GK	30 March 1988 (aged 25)	(Brazil) Grêmio Porto Alegrense
25	Diogo Silva	(Brazil)	GK	8 July 1986 (aged 27)	(Brazil) Nova Iguaçu
Defenders
4	Nei	(Brazil)	RB / LB	6 December 1985 (aged 28)	(Brazil) Internacional
6	Yoshimar Yotún (on loan from Sporting Cristal)	(Peru)	LB / LWB / LWM	7 April 1990 (aged 23)	(Peru) Sporting Cristal
13	Cris	(Brazil)	CB	3 June 1977 (aged 36)	(Brazil) Grêmio Porto Alegrense
14	Luan (youth player)	(Brazil)	CB / RB	10 May 1993 (aged 20)	Youth system
18	Rafael Vaz	(Brazil)	CB	17 September 1988 (aged 25)	(Brazil) Ceará
23	Fagner (on loan from Wolfsburg)	(Brazil)	RB / RWB / RWM	11 June 1989 (aged 24)	(Germany) Wolfsburg
28	Jomar	(Brazil)	CB	28 September 1992 (aged 21)	Youth system
33	Renato Silva	(Brazil)	CB	26 July 1983 (aged 30)	(Brazil) Vasco da Gama (loaned from Shandong Luneng Taishan)
36	Dieyson (youth player)	(Brazil)	LB	30 June 1993 (aged 20)	Youth system
37	Henrique (youth player)	(Brazil)	LB	25 April 1994 (aged 19)	Youth system
	Rodolfo	(Brazil)	CB	23 October 1982 (aged 31)	(Brazil) Grêmio (loaned from Lokomotiv Moscow)
Midfielders
5	Pablo Guiñazú	(Argentina)	DMF / LSM	26 August 1978 (aged 35)	(Paraguay) Libertad
8	Juninho Pernambucano	(Brazil)	AMF / CMF	30 January 1975 (aged 38)	(United States) New York Red Bulls
10	Pedro Ken (on loan from Cruzeiro)	(Brazil)	CMF / LWM / RWM / AMF / DMF	20 March 1987 (aged 26)	(Brazil) Vitória (loaned from Cruzeiro)
15	Fillipe Soutto (on loan from Atlético Mineiro)	(Brazil)	LSM	11 March 1991 (aged 22)	(Brazil) Atlético Mineiro
16	Francismar (on loan from Boa)	(Brazil)	AMF / LSM / LWM	18 April 1984 (aged 29)	(Brazil) Boa
17	Wendel	(Brazil)	LSM / LWM / LB / RWB	8 April 1982 (aged 31)	(Saudi Arabia) Al Shabab (Riyadh)
20	Santiago Montoya	(Colombia)	AMF / LW / SS	15 September 1991 (aged 22)	(Argentina) All Boys
22	Abuda	(Brazil)	DMF / CMF	22 January 1989 (aged 24)	(Brazil) Cruzeiro (RS)
29	Jhon Cley (youth player)	(Brazil)	AMF / LWM / RWM / CMF	9 March 1994 (aged 19)	Youth system
30	Marlone	(Brazil)	AMF / SS / LW	2 April 1992 (aged 21)	Youth system
31	Bernardo	(Brazil)	AMF / CF / LW	20 May 1990 (aged 23)	(Brazil) Santos (loaned from Vasco da Gama)
32	Guilherme (youth player)	(Brazil)	AMF / LWM	31 March 1994 (aged 19)	Youth system
35	Baiano	(Brazil)	DMF	13 June 1992 (aged 21)	Youth system
84	Sandro Silva	(Brazil)	DMF / RSM	29 April 1984 (aged 29)	(Brazil) Cruzeiro (loaned from Málaga)
87	Dakson	(Brazil)	AMF	11 July 1987 (aged 26)	(Bulgaria) Lokomotiv Plovdiv
Forwards
9	André (on loan from Atlético Mineiro)	(Brazil)	ST	27 September 1990 (aged 23)	(Brazil) Santos (loaned from Atlético Mineiro)
11	Carlos Tenorio	(Ecuador)	ST	14 May 1979 (aged 34)	(United Arab Emirates) Al-Nasr Dubai
19	Edmílson	(Brazil)	ST / RW	15 September 1982 (aged 31)	(Japan) FC Tokyo (loaned from Al-Gharafa)
41	Robinho	(Brazil)	CF / LW	8 September 1987 (aged 26)	(Brazil) Guarani
91	Reginaldo	(Brazil)	RW / LW / SS	31 July 1983 (aged 30)	(Italy) Siena
93	Willie (on loan from Vitória)	(Brazil)	SS / RW / LW	15 May 1993 (aged 20)	(Brazil) Vitória

==== from Vasco da Gama (U–20) (ables to play in first team) ====
As of 31 July 2013.

No.	Name	Nationality	Position (s)	Date of birth (age)	Youth Level
Goalkeepers
40	Jordi (youth player)	(Brazil)	GK	3 September 1993 (aged 20)	(Brazil) Vasco da Gama (U–20)
Defenders
	Lorran (youth player)	(Brazil)	LB	8 January 1996 (aged 17)	(Brazil) Vasco da Gama (U–17)
	Richard (youth player)	(Brazil)	RB / RWB	3 April 1995 (aged 18)	(Brazil) Vasco da Gama (U–20)
	Thadeu Paraguai (youth player)	(Brazil)	CB	23 September 1993 (aged 20)	(Brazil) Vasco da Gama (U–20)
Midfielders
	Danilo (youth player)	(Brazil)	LSM / DMF	28 January 1996 (aged 17)	(Brazil) Vasco da Gama (U–17)
Forwards
27	Yago (youth player)	(Brazil)	LW / RW / SS	28 April 1994 (aged 19)	(Brazil) Vasco da Gama (U–20)
39	Thalles (youth player)	(Brazil)	ST	18 May 1995 (aged 18)	(Brazil) Vasco da Gama (U–20)

==== Reserve players (Vasco da Gama B) ====
No.	Name	Nationality	Position (s)	Date of birth (age)	Signed from
Defenders
	Roni Carlo	(Brazil)	CB	2 September 1992 (aged 21)	(Brazil) America (RJ) (loan from Vasco da Gama)
Midfielders
	Enrico	(Brazil)	AMF	4 May 1984 (aged 29)	(Brazil) Ponte Preta (loan from Vasco da Gama)
	Marquinhos Moraes	(Brazil)	LWM / LW / AMF / SS	21 June 1991 (aged 22)	(Romania) Gloria Progresul Bistrița (loan from Vasco da Gama)
	Renato Augusto	(Brazil)	DMF / CMF	17 July 1991 (aged 22)	(Brazil) Vasco da Gama
Forwards
	Guilherme Morano	(Brazil)	ST	2 January 1992 (aged 21)	(Brazil) Boavista (loan from Vasco da Gama)
	Jonathan	(Brazil)	SS / AMF / LW / RW	22 February 1994 (aged 19)	(Brazil) São Bernardo (loan from Vasco da Gama)

==== Out on loan ====
As of 31 July 2013.

No.	Name	Nationality	Position (s)	Date of birth (age)	Signed from
Defenders
	Max (on loan to Paysandu)	(Brazil)	RB / LB	28 April 1990 (aged 23)	(Brazil) Mogi Mirim (loan)
Midfielders
21	Fellipe Bastos (on loan to Ponte Preta)	(Brazil)	CMF / RSM / LSM	1 February 1990 (aged 23)	(Switzerland) Servette (loan from S.L. Benfica)
Forwards
7	Éder Luís (on loan to Al-Nasr Dubai)	(Brazil)	RW / ST / SS	29 April 1985 (aged 28)	(Brazil) Vasco da Gama
20	Romário (on loan to Arouca)	(Brazil)	ST	15 January 1992 (aged 21)	(Brazil) Vasco da Gama
	Nilson (on loan to Bragantino)	(Brazil)	ST	6 April 1991 (aged 22)	(Brazil) Paraná (loan)
	Rodrigo Dinamite (on loan to Oeste)	(Brazil)	AT	25 August 1992 (aged 21)	(Brazil) Duque de Caxias (loan)
	Washington (on loan to Duque de Caxias)	(Brazil)	SS / AMF	22 October 1992 (aged 21)	(Brazil) Vasco da Gama U-20
	Willen (on loan to América (RN))	(Brazil)	ST	10 January 1992 (aged 21)	(Brazil) Bangu (loan)
	William Barbio (on loan to Bahia)	(Brazil)	RW / SS / LW	22 October 1992 (aged 21)	(Brazil) Atlético Goianiense (loan)

=== Transfer summary ===
==== In ====
Date	Player	Number	Position	Previous club	Fee/notes	Ref
13 November 2012	(Brazil) Thiaguinho		FW	(Brazil) Cruzeiro	Free transfer	
19 December 2012	(Brazil) Michel Alves		GK	(Brazil) Criciúma	Free transfer, end of contract	
31 December 2012	(Brazil) Bernardo		MF	(Brazil) Santos	Loan return	
1 January 2013	(Brazil) Diogo Silva		GK	(Brazil) Vasco da Gama (on loan from Nova Iguaçu)	R$ 1 million (100% of federal rights)	
2 January 2013	(Brazil) André Ribeiro		DF	(Brazil) Novo Hamburgo	Undisclosed	
24 January 2013	(Brazil) Nei		DF	(Brazil) Internacional	End of contract	
23 December 2012; 8 February 2013	(Brazil) Sandro Silva		MF	(Brazil) Cruzeiro (on loan from Málaga)	Traded in exchange for trade of Nílton; Payment of the contract rescission fine (R$ unknown)	
15 February 2013	(Brazil) Robinho		FW	(Brazil) Guarani	End of contract	
4 April 2012	(Brazil) Edmilson		FW	(Japan) F.C. Tokyo (on loan from Al-Gharafa)	Free transfer	
1 May 2013	(Brazil) Baiano		MF	(Brazil) Vasco da Gama U-20	Youth system, free agent	
7 June 2013	(Brazil) Reginaldo		FW	(Italy) Siena	Free transfer	
7 June 2013	(Colombia) Santiago Montoya		MF	(Argentina) All Boys	R$ 3 million (80% of federal rights)	
10 June 2013	(Brazil) Rafael Vaz		DF	(Brazil) Ceará	R$ 500,000 (100% of federal rights)	
11 July 2013	(Brazil) Juninho Pernambucano		MF	(United States) New York Red Bulls	Free transfer	
18 July 2013	(Argentina) Pablo Guiñazú		MF	(Paraguay) Libertad	R$ 800,000 (to Internacional)	
8 August 2013	(Brazil) Cris		DF	(Brazil) Grêmio	Free transfer	

===== Loan In =====
Date from	Date to	Player	Number	Position	Previous club	Fee/notes	Ref
20 November 2012	20 August 2013	(Brazil) Elsinho		DF	(Brazil) Figueirense (on loan from Tombense)	Loan transfer from Tombense	
19 December 2012	31 December 2013	(Brazil) Fillipe Soutto		MF	(Brazil) Atlético Mineiro	Loaned in exchange for trade of Alecsandro	
19 December 2012	5 September 2013	(Brazil) Leonardo		FW	(Brazil) Atlético Mineiro	Loaned in exchange for trade of Alecsandro	
23 December 2012	31 December 2014	(Brazil) Pedro Ken		MF	(Brazil) Vitória (on loan from Cruzeiro)	Loaned in exchange for trade of Nílton	
18 January 2013	31 December 2013	(Peru) Yoshimar Yotún		DF	(Peru) Sporting Cristal	Loan transfer from Sporting Cristal; R$ unknown	
4 April 2013	5 August 2013	(Brazil) Alisson		MF	(Brazil) Cruzeiro / Cruzeiro U-20	Loaned in exchange for trade of Dedé	
1 May 2013	30 September 2013	(Brazil) Fábio Lima		MF	(Brazil) Vasco da Gama U-20 (on loan from Atlético Goianiense U-20)	Youth system Loan transfer from Atlético Goianiense	
20 May 2013	31 December 2013	(Brazil) André		FW	(Brazil) Santos (on loan from Atlético Mineiro)	Loan transfer from Atlético Mineiro	
17 July 2013	31 December 2013	(Brazil) Willie		FW	(Brazil) Vitória / Vitória U-20	Loan transfer from Vitória	
18 July 2013	31 December 2013	(Brazil) Fagner		DF	(Germany) Wolfsburg	Loan transfer from Wolfsburg	
1 October 2013	31 December 2013	(Brazil) Francismar		MF	(Brazil) Boa	Loan transfer from Boa	

===== On Trial (In) =====
Date from	Date to	Player	Number	Position	Previous club	Fee/notes	Ref
3 January 2013		(Brazil) Enrico		MF	(Brazil) Ponte Preta	Loan return	
3 January 2013		(Brazil) Renato Augusto	23	MF			
3 January 2013	15 July 2013	(Brazil) Nilson		FW	(Brazil) Arapongas	Loan return	
3 January 2013	13 January 2013	(Brazil) Pedrinho		MF			
10 January 2013	31 January 2013	(Brazil) Marcos Felipe		DF	(Brazil) Americano	Technical evaluation period	
1 May 2013		(Brazil) Guilherme Morano		FW	(Brazil) Volta Redonda	Loan return	
1 May 2013		(Brazil) Jonathan		FW	(Brazil) São Bernardo	Loan return	
1 June 2013		(Brazil) Marquinhos Moraes		MF	(Romania) Gloria Progresul Bistrița	Loan return	
15 July 2013		(Brazil) Roni Carlo		DF	(Brazil) America (RJ)	Loan return	
5 September 2013	10 September 2013	(Brazil) Rodrigo Biro		DF	(Brazil) Ponte Preta	Medical evaluation period	

==== Out ====
Date	Player	Number	Position	Destination club	Fee/notes	Ref
1 December 2012	(Brazil) Diego Rosa	27	MF	(Brazil) Ponte Preta	End of contract Released	
4 December 2012; 14 January 2013	(Brazil) Eduardo Costa	5	MF	(Brazil) Avaí	End of contract	
10 December 2012; 11 December 2012	(Brazil) Fernando Prass	1	GK	(Brazil) Palmeiras	Judicial rescission (non-payment of wages for Fernando Prass)	
14 December 2012	(Brazil) Auremir	25	MF	(Brazil) Náutico	Judicial rescission (non-payments of wages for Auremir and transfer for Náutico); Released	
17 December 2012	(Brazil) Juninho Pernambucano	8	MF	(United States) New York Red Bulls	End of contract	
18 December 2012	(Brazil) Pipico	17	FW	(United States) FC Dallas	End of contract	
18 December 2012; 23 December 2012	(Brazil) Nílton	19	MF	(Brazil) Cruzeiro	Judicial rescission (non-payment of wages for Nílton); Traded in exchange for Sandro Silva and loan of Pedro Ken	
19 December 2012; 14 January 2013	(Brazil) Fabrício	3	DF	(Brazil) Vitória	End of contract Released	
19 December 2012	(Brazil) William Matheus	18	DF	(Brazil) Goiás	End of loan from Sociedade Boca Júnior (SE); Released	
19 December 2012	(Brazil) Alecsandro	9	FW	(Brazil) Atlético Mineiro	Traded in exchange for loans of Fillipe Soutto and Leonardo	
31 December 2012	(Brazil) Bruno Paulo		FW	(Brazil) Desportivo Brasil	End of loan from Desportivo Brasil; Released	
31 December 2012	(Argentina) Leandro Chaparro	45	MF	(Brazil) Madureira (on loan from Desportivo Brasil)	End of loan to Desportivo Brasil	
8 January 2013; 19 January 2013	(Brazil) Felipe	6	MF	(Brazil) Fluminense	Mutual contract rescission	
22 January 2013; 19 February 2013	(Brazil) Jonas	13	DF	(Brazil) Atlético Paranaense	Judicial rescission (non-payment of wages for Jonas); Released	
30 January 2013	(Brazil) Douglas	16	DF	(Ukraine) Dnipro Dnipropetrovsk	R$ 5,5 million (50% of federal rights)	
31 December 2012; 8 February 2013	(Brazil) Mateus		MF	(Brazil) Mogi Mirim	Released, end of contract, previously on Criciúma on loan from Vasco da Gama	
17 April 2013	(Brazil) Dedé	26	DF	(Brazil) Cruzeiro	Traded in exchange for R$ 14 million (45% of federal rights) and loan of Alisson	
1 May 2013	(Brazil) André Ribeiro	13	DF		Waived	
27 June 2013	(Brazil) Jeferson Silva		MF		Mutual contract rescission Released	
29 June 2013; 30 August 2013	(Brazil) Thiago Feltri	18	DF	(Brazil) Joinville	Judicial rescission (non-payment of wages for Thiago Feltri); Released	
2 August 2013	(Brazil) Carlos Alberto	10	MF		End of contract	
5 September 2013	(Brazil) Maicon Assis		FW	(Portugal) Trofense	Mutual contract rescission Released	
23 September 2013	(Brazil) Thiaguinho	97	FW	(Brazil) Guaratinguetá	Mutual contract rescission Released	
26 September 2013; 31 May 2014	(Brazil) Danilo		MF	(Portugal) Sporting de Braga	U-20/U-17 player R$ 13,5 million	

===== Loan Out =====
Date from	Date to	Player	Number	Position	Destination club	Fee/notes	Ref
5 July 2012	1 June 2013	(Brazil) Marquinhos Moraes		MF	(Romania) Gloria Bistrița	Loan transfer	
10 December 2012	31 May 2013	(Brazil) Jeferson Silva		MF	(Brazil) Velo Clube Rioclarense	Loan transfer	
13 December 2012	30 April 2013	(Brazil) Jonathan	15	FW	(Brazil) São Bernardo	Loan transfer	
22 December 2012	30 April 2013	(Brazil) Willen		FW	(Brazil) Bangu	Loan transfer	
1 January 2013	30 April 2013	(Brazil) Guilherme Morano		FW	(Brazil) Volta Redonda	Loan transfer	
2 January 2013	7 August 2013	(Brazil) William Barbio	44	FW	(Brazil) Atlético Goianiense	Loan transfer	
30 January 2013	30 April 2013	(Brazil) Max	43	DF	(Brazil) Mogi Mirim	Loan transfer	
11 February 2013	31 May 2013	(Brazil) Maicon Assis	37	FW	(Brazil) Veranópolis	Loan transfer	
17 February 2013	30 April 2013	(Brazil) Andrey		MF	(Brazil) Santa Cruz (RN)	Loan transfer	
5 March 2013	10 April 2013	(Brazil) Jomar		DF	(Brazil) Rio Branco de Americana	Loan transfer	
28 June 2013	31 December 2013	(Brazil) Romário	20	FW	(Portugal) Arouca	Loan transfer	
15 July 2013	31 Dezember 2013	(Brazil) Nilson		FW	(Brazil) Bragantino	Loan transfer	
15 July 2013	31 Dezember 2013	(Brazil) Washington Tomaz		FW	(Brazil) Duque de Caxias	Loan transfer	
8 August 2013	31 December 2013	(Brazil) William Barbio	44	FW	(Brazil) Bahia	Loan transfer	
22 August 2013	31 December 2013	(Brazil) Max		DF	(Brazil) Paysandu	Loan transfer	
25 August 2013	30 June 2015	(Brazil) Éder Luís	7	FW	(United Arab Emirates) Al-Nasr Dubai	Loan transfer for two seasons R$ 6 million	
1 September 2013	31 September 2013	(Brazil) Andrey		MF	(Brazil) Real Noroeste Capixaba	Loan transfer	
5 September 2013	31 December 2013	(Brazil) Fellipe Bastos	21	MF	(Brazil) Ponte Preta	Loan transfer	
10 September 2013	31 December 2013	(Brazil) Willen		FW	(Brazil) América (RN)	Loan transfer	
27 September 2013	31 December 2013	(Brazil) Rodrigo Dinamite		FW	(Brazil) Oeste	Loan transfer	

===== On Trial (Out) =====
Date from	Date to	Player	Number	Position	Destination club	Fee/notes	Ref
20 May 2013	31 August 2013	(Brazil) Andrey		MF	(Brazil) Real Noroeste Capixaba		
15 July 2013	31 August 2013	(Brazil) Maicon Assis	37	FW	(Portugal) Trofense		

== Club ==
=== Coaching staff ===
Position	Staff	Nation
Head coach	Adílson Batista	Brazil
Assistant coach	Silveira	Brazil
Assistant coach/Reserve Team Head Coach	Jorge Luiz	Brazil
Goalkeepers Coach	Carlos Germano	Brazil
Fitness coach	Francisco González	Brazil
Assistant coach and Scout	Gaúcho	Brazil

Source: Coaching staff

Position/Title	Name
President and Chairman	Roberto Dinamite
Football director	Ricardo Gomes
General CEO	Cristiano Koehler
Auxiliar Football CEO	Daniel Freitas
Director of Marketing	Henry Canfield
Director of Youth Development/U-23 Team Head Coach	Mauro Galvão
Medical Director	Dr. Clóvis Munhoz

Source: Staff

=== Facilities ===
Ground (capacity and dimensions)	Estádio São Januário (23,500 / 110x75m)
Training ground (capacity and dimensions)	CFZ Training Complex (500 / 108x64m)

Source: Facilities

=== Official sponsors ===
- CAIXA (since July 2013)
- Nissan (since July 2013)
- LG (since July 2013)
- Penalty
- Brazil Foodservice Group
- Eletrobras (until June 2013)
- Fresh Juices (until June 2013)
- Brahma
- TIM

Source: CRVascodaGama.com

== Match results ==
Win Tie Loss

=== Preseason ===
==== Pedrinho's farewell ====
Vasco da Gama's only preseason friendly in 2013 was against Ajax. The friendly was the last match of Pedrinho, one of Vasco da Gama's revered players.

13 January 2013	Vasco da Gama (Brazil)	1 – 0	(Netherlands) Ajax	Rio de Janeiro
17:00 BST	Wendel 16'	Report; Report		Stadium: Estádio Vasco da Gama (São Januário); Attendance: 9,662; Referee: Marcelo de Lima Henrique (Brazil); Man of the Match: Pedrinho

=== Rio de Janeiro State Championship ===
==== Guanabara Cup ====
Group A
Pos	Team	Pld	W	D	L	GF	GA	GD	Pts	Qualification or relegation
1	Vasco da Gama	8	5	1	2	18	11	+7	16	Advanced to the Semifinals
2	Botafogo	8	4	3	1	17	7	+10	15	Advanced to the Semifinals
3	Madureira	8	3	3	2	11	10	+1	12	
4	Friburguense	8	2	3	3	10	14	−4	9	
5	Volta Redonda	8	1	3	4	7	12	−5	6	
6	Quissamã	8	1	3	4	2	9	−7	6	
7	Nova Iguaçu	8	1	2	5	7	10	−3	5	
8	Olaria	8	0	3	5	5	14	−9	3	

Updated to match(es) played on 24 February 2013. Source: www.socerway.com
Rules for classification: 1st points; 2nd wins; 3rd goal difference; 4th goals scored; 5th red cards received; 6th yellow cards received; 7th draw.

===== Guanabara Cup group stage matches =====
19 January 2013 Group stage: Match 1	Boavista	0 – 3	Vasco da Gama	Volta Redonda
19:30 BDT	Túlio Souza (yellow card) 30'; Everton Silva (yellow card) 66'	Report; Report	17' (yellow card) 25' Carlos Alberto; 28' Éder Luís; 73' Bernardo	Stadium: Estádio Raulino de Oliveira; Attendance: 5,703; Referee: Rodrigo Nunes de Sá; Man of the Match: Pedro Ken

23 January 2013 Group stage: Match 2	Vasco da Gama	4 – 2	Macaé	Rio de Janeiro
22:00 BDT	Bernardo 21'; Carlos Alberto 32'; André Ribeiro 50' (yellow card) 52'; Dedé 90+3' (pen.)	Report; Report	16' Michel; 79' (pen.) Anderson Costa; (yellow card) 35' Daniel; (yellow card) 80' Ricardinho	Stadium: Estádio Vasco da Gama (São Januário); Attendance: 4,576; Referee: Eduardo Cordeiro Guimarães

26 January 2013 Group stage: Match 3	Resende	2 – 4	Vasco da Gama	Volta Redonda
21:00 BDT	Dudu 45+2'; Marcel 54'	Report; Report	11', 48' Bernardo; 40' Dedé; 82' Leonardo	Stadium: Estádio Raulino de Oliveira; Attendance: 2,820; Referee: Luis Antonio Silva dos Santos

31 January 2013 Group stage: Match 4	Vasco da Gama	2 – 4	Flamengo	Rio de Janeiro
19:30 BDT	Pedro Ken 33'; Dakson 73'; Éder Luís (yellow card) 19'; Jhon Cley (yellow card) 20'	Report; Report	25' (yellow card) 45+1' Hernane; 31' Nixon; 49' Cléber Santana; 65' Rafinha; 19' Elias; (yellow card) 57' Leonardo Moura; (yellow card) 89' Thomas	Stadium: Estádio Olímpico João Havelange (Engenhão); Attendance: 15,669; Referee: Wagner Nascimento Magalhães

3 February 2013 Group stage: Match 5	Vasco da Gama	0 – 1	Bangu	Rio de Janeiro
19:30 BDT	André Ribeiro (yellow card) 61'; Dakson (yellow card) 90+4'	Report; Report	55' Hugo; (yellow card) 82' André Barreto	Stadium: Estádio Vasco da Gama (São Januário); Attendance: 4,267; Referee: Mauricio Machado Coelho

9 February 2013 Group stage: Match 6	Fluminense	1 – 1	Vasco da Gama	Rio de Janeiro
17:00 BDT	Fred 88' (yellow card) 72'; Edinho (yellow card) 18'; Jean (yellow card) 41'; Digão (yellow card) 60'; Leandro Euzébio (yellow card) 74'	Report; Report	43' (o.g.) Jean; (yellow card) 40' Wendel; (yellow card) 89' Carlos Alberto	Stadium: Estádio Olímpico João Havelange (Engenhão); Referee: Grazziani Maciel Rocha

17 February 2013 Group stage: Match 7	Vasco da Gama	2 – 0	Audax Rio de Janeiro	Rio de Janeiro
16:00 BST	Éder Luís 49'; Carlos Alberto 66'; Dedé (yellow card) 34'; Renato Silva (yellow card) 63'; Dieyson (yellow card) 77'	Report; Report	(yellow card) 19' Denilson; (yellow card) 41' André Castro	Stadium: Estádio Vasco da Gama (São Januário); Attendance: 6,396; Referee: Daniel de Sousa Macedo

24 February 2013 Group stage: Match 8	Duque de Caxias	1 – 2	Vasco da Gama	Macaé
16:00 BST	Charles Chad 19'; Iago Santos (yellow card) 8'; Paulão (yellow card) 35'; Antônio Carlos Ratinho (yellow card) 60'; Renan Silva (yellow card) 62'	Report; Report	74', 80' (yellow card) 75' Bernardo; (yellow card) 31' Nei	Stadium: Estádio Cláudio Moacyr de Azevedo (Moacyrzão); Attendance: 5,584; Referee: André Rodrigo Rocha

===== Guanabara Cup knockout stage matches =====
2 March 2013 Semifinal	Vasco da Gama	3 – 2	Fluminense	Rio de Janeiro
18:30 BST	Bernardo 70' (yellow card) 65'; Romário 85'; Dedé 87'; Wendel (yellow card) 59'; Fellipe Bastos (yellow card) 89'; Pedro Ken (yellow card) 90+4'; Dakson (yellow card) 90+4'	Report; Report	78' Thiago Neves; 80' (yellow card) 55' Wellington Nem	Stadium: Estádio Olímpico João Havelange (Engenhão); Attendance: 20,632; Referee: Rodrigo Nunes de Sá; Man of the Match: Dedé

10 March 2013 Final	Vasco da Gama	0 – 1	Botafogo	Rio de Janeiro
16:00 BST	Wendel (yellow card) 17'; Thiago Feltri (yellow card) 38'; Éder Luís (yellow card) 41'; Abuda (yellow card) 53'; Carlos Alberto (yellow card) 62'	Report; Report	80' Lucas; (yellow card) 42' Marcelo Mattos; (yellow card) 89' Seedorf; (yellow card) 89' Jefferson	Stadium: Estádio Olímpico João Havelange (Engenhão); Attendance: 39,400; Referee: Wagner do Nascimento Magalhães

==== Rio Cup ====
Group A
Pos	Team	Pld	W	D	L	GF	GA	GD	Pts	Qualification or relegation
1	Botafogo	7	7	0	0	20	3	+17	21	Advanced to the Semifinals
2	Volta Redonda	7	4	1	2	5	3	+2	13	Advanced to the Semifinals
3	Friburguense	7	3	1	3	15	10	+5	10	
4	Olaria	7	2	3	2	3	9	−6	9	
5	Madureira	7	2	2	3	5	6	−1	8	
6	Nova Iguaçu	7	2	2	3	7	10	−3	8	
7	Vasco da Gama	7	2	1	4	5	9	−4	7	
8	Quissamã	7	0	2	5	6	16	−10	2	

Updated to match(es) played on 21 April 2013. Source: www.socerway.com
Rules for classification: 1st points; 2 wins; 3 goal difference; 4 goals scored; 5 red cards received; 6 yellow cards received; 7 draw.

===== Rio Cup group stage matches =====
17 March 2013 Group stage: Match 1	Vasco da Gama	0 – 1	Volta Redonda	Rio de Janeiro
16:00 BST	Sandro Silva (yellow card) 62'	Report; Report	12' André Alves; (yellow card) 54' Leonardo Luiz; (yellow card) 71' Da Silva	Stadium: Estádio Vasco da Gama (São Januário); Attendance: 4,316; Referee: João Batista Arruda

20 March 2013 Group stage: Match 2	Nova Iguaçu	2 – 0	Vasco da Gama	Volta Redonda
22:00 BST	Léo Salino 43', 87' (yellow card) 71'; Silvio (yellow card) 44'; Marcelinho (yellow card) 58'; Maycon (yellow card) 67'; Sylvestre (yellow card) 70'; Leonardo (yellow card) 90+1'	Report; Report	(yellow card) 20' Romário	Stadium: Estádio Raulino de Oliveira; Attendance: 1,248; Referee: Leonardo Garcia Cavaleiro

27 March 2013 Group stage: Match 3	Olaria	0 – 0	Vasco da Gama	Rio de Janeiro
16:00 BST	Rafael (yellow card) 35'; Erick Santos (yellow card) 65'; Assis (yellow card) 81'; Victor Lemos (yellow card) 90+2'; Leandrão (yellow card) 90+4'	Report; Report	(yellow card) 35' Nei; (yellow card) 39' Fellipe Bastos; (yellow card) 76' Dedé; (yellow card) 90+2' Carlos Alberto; (yellow card) 90+3' Dakson	Stadium: Estádio Proletário Guilherme da Silveira Filho (Moça Bonita); Referee: Rodrigo Nunes de Sá

3 April 2013 Group stage: Match 4	Vasco da Gama	0 – 3	Botafogo	Volta Redonda
22:00 BST	Sandro Silva (yellow card) 27'; Alessandro (red card)	Report; Report	53' Rafael Marques; 59' Lodeiro; 73' Fellype Gabriel; (yellow card) 69' Bolívar	Stadium: Estádio Raulino de Oliveira; Attendance: 6,994; Referee: Luis Antonio Santos

7 April 2013 Group stage: Match 5	Vasco da Gama	2 – 1	Friburguense	Rio de Janeiro
18:30 BST	Tenorio 26'; Dakson 83'	Report; Report	36' Lucas	Stadium: Estádio Vasco da Gama (São Januário); Attendance: 1,845; Referee: Estevão Cunha da Trindade

13 April 2013 Group stage: Match 6	Vasco da Gama	3 – 1	Quissamã	Rio de Janeiro
16:00 BST	Dedé 33'; Tenorio 35'; Thiaguinho 90+1' (pen.); Fillipe Soutto (yellow card) 67'; Elsinho (yellow card) 71'	Report; Report	40' (pen.) Gustavo Correia; (yellow card) 56' Bruno Neves	Stadium: Estádio Vasco da Gama (São Januário); Attendance: 2,393; Referee: Leonardo Cavalero

20 April 2013 Group stage: Match 7	Madureira	1 – 0	Vasco da Gama	Rio de Janeiro
15:30 BST	Derley 78' (pen.); Ramon (yellow card) 86'	Report; Report	(yellow card) 80' Tenorio; (yellow card) 80' Renato Silva	Stadium: Estádio Aniceto Moscoso (Conselheiro Galvão); Referee: Leandro Newley

=== Brasileirão Série A ===
Pos	Team	Pld	W	D	L	GF	GA	GD	Pts	Qualification or relegation
16	Flamengo	38	12	13	13	43	46	−3	45 (Note: Flamengo and Portuguesa were punished for selecting suspended players in Round 38. Each club lost 4 points.)	2014 Copa Libertadores Second Stage (Note: Atlético Mineiro is qualified for the second stage of the 2014 Copa Libertadores as the 2013 Copa Libertadores champion. Flamengo is qualified for the second stage of the 2014 Copa Libertadores as the 2013 Copa do Brasil champion.)
17	Portuguesa (R)	38	12	12	14	50	46	+4	44	Relegation to Série B
18	Vasco da Gama (R)	38	11	11	16	50	61	−11	44	Relegation to Série B
19	Ponte Preta (R)	38	9	10	19	37	55	−18	37	Relegation to Série B
20	Náutico (R)	38	5	5	28	22	79	−57	20	Relegation to Série B

Updated to match(es) played on unknown. Source: Soccerway.com
Rules for classification: 1st points; 2nd wins; 3rd goal difference; 4th goals scored; 5th head-to-head results; 6th least red cards received; 7th least yellow cards received; 8th draw.
(R) Relegated

==== Brasileirão Série A results summary ====
Overall								Home						Away					
Pld	W	D	L	GF	GA	GD	Pts	W	D	L	GF	GA	GD	W	D	L	GF	GA	GD
38	11	11	16	50	61	−11	44	8	5	6	26	23	+3	3	6	10	24	38	−14

Source: Brazilian Série A Results

==== Brasileirão Série A results by round ====
Round	1	2	3	4	5	6	7	8	9	10	11	12	13	14	15	16	17	18	19	20	21	22	23	24	25	26	27	28	29	30	31	32	33	34	35	36	37	38
Ground	H	A	A	H	H	A	N	A	H	A	N	H	A	A	H	N	A	A	H	A	H	A	A	A	H	N	H	A	H	N	A	H	H	A	A	H	H	A
Result	W	L	L	W	D	L	L	W	W	D	L	D	W	D	L	D	L	W	D	L	L	L	L	D	W	D	W	L	L	D	L	W	D	L	D	W	W	L
Position	7	13	15	10	9	14	17	10	7	8	10	11	10	9	11	11	14	10	10	14	17	18	18	18	16	17	17	18	18	17	18	17	16	18	18	18	17	18

Updated to match(es) played on December 8, 2013. Source: Brazilian Série A Results
A = Away; H = Home; W = Win; D = Draw; L = Loss

==== Brasileirão Série A matches results ====
25 May 2013 Match 1	Vasco da Gama	1 – 0	Portuguesa	Rio de Janeiro
18:30 BST	Tenorio 48'; Yotún (yellow card) 30'; Luan (yellow card) 87'	Report; Report	Diogo (yellow card) 78' (red card) 78'	Stadium: Estádio Vasco da Gama (São Januário); Attendance: 11,099; Referee: Elmo Alves Resende Cunha

29 May 2013 Match 2	São Paulo	5 – 1	Vasco da Gama	São Paulo
19:30 BST	Luís Fabiano 61', 75'; Aloísio 69'; Thiago Carleto 73'; Luan 85'; Denílson (yellow card) 32'	Report; Report	83' Dakson; (yellow card) 10' Fellipe Bastos	Stadium: Estádio Cícero Pompeu de Toledo (Morumbi); Attendance: 8,079 (paying); Referee: Márcio Chagas da Silva

1 June 2013 Match 3	Vitória	2 – 0	Vasco da Gama	Salvador, Bahia
18:30 BST	Dinei 32', 60' (pen.)	Report; Report	(yellow card) 31' Elsinho; (yellow card) 59' Renato Silva	Stadium: Estádio Manoel Barradas (Barradão); Attendance: unknown Referee: Héber Roberto Lopes

5 June 2013 Match 4	Vasco da Gama	2 – 0	Atlético Mineiro	Volta Redonda
21:00 BST	Alisson 70' (yellow card) 71'; Abuda 90+4'; Luan (yellow card) 48'; Elsinho (yellow card) 69'	Report; Report	(yellow card) 32' Leonardo Silva	Stadium: Estádio Raulino de Oliveira; Attendance: 2,744; Referee: Raphael Claus

8 June 2013 Match 5	Vasco da Gama	1 – 1	Bahia	Volta Redonda
18:30 BST	Carlos Alberto 22' (pen.) (yellow card) 45'; Sandro Silva (yellow card) 39'; Dakson (yellow card) 90+4'	Report; Report	8' Fernandão; (yellow card) 21' Fahel; (yellow card) 34' (yellow-red card) 58' Diones; (yellow card) 60' Titi; (yellow card) 73' Neto	Stadium: Estádio Raulino de Oliveira; Attendance: 3,986; Referee: Marcelo Aparecido de Souza

7 July 2013 Match 6	Internacional	5 – 3	Vasco da Gama	Caxias do Sul
16:00 BST	Nei 17' (o.g.); Forlán 39'; Índio 56'; Rafael Moura 72'; D'Alessandro 76'; Jackson (yellow card) 85'	Report; Report	45+1' André; 64' Rafael Vaz; 84' Fellipe Bastos; (yellow card) 90+3' Alisson	Stadium: Estádio Francisco Stédile (Centenário); Attendance: 3,549; Referee: Ricardo Marques

14 July 2013 Match 7	Vasco da Gama	0 – 1	Flamengo	Brasília
18:30 BST	Sandro Silva (yellow card) 22'; Wendel (yellow card) 38'; Nei (yellow card) 62'; Rafael Vaz (yellow card) 90+2'	Report; Report	30' Paulinho; (yellow card) 37' Cáceres	Stadium: Estádio Nacional Mané Garrincha; Attendance: 61,767 (paying); Referee: Grazziani Maciel

21 July 2013 Match 8	Fluminense	1 – 3	Vasco da Gama	Rio de Janeiro
18:30 BST	Carlinhos 57'; Rafael Sóbis (yellow card) 16'; Fred (red card); Digão (yellow card) 54' (yellow-red card) 74'	Report; Report	17' (yellow card) 13' Juninho Pernambucano; 47' André; 83' Tenorio; (yellow card) 48' Henrique; (yellow card) 68' Jomar; (yellow card) 78' Wendel	Stadium: Estádio Mário Filho (Maracanã); Attendance: 46,860; Referee: Marcelo de Lima Henrique

27 July 2013 Match 9	Vasco da Gama	3 – 2	Criciúma	Rio de Janeiro
18:30 BST	Juninho Pernambucano 9' (yellow card) 79'; Rafael Vaz 56'; Edmilson 74'; André (yellow card) 34'; Jomar (yellow card) 90+2'	Report; Report	62' Ivo; 72' Wellington Paulista; (yellow card) 5' Fábio Ferreira; (yellow card) 79' Matheus Ferraz	Stadium: Estádio Vasco da Gama (São Januário); Attendance: 18,306; Referee: Márcio Chagas da Silva

1 August 2013 Match 10	Goiás	1 – 1	Vasco da Gama	Goiânia
21:00 BST	Walter 89' (pen.); Vítor (yellow card) 50'; Rodrigo (yellow card) 81'; David (yellow card) 90+3'	Report; Report	16' Pedro Ken; (yellow card) 40' Renato Silva; (yellow card) 80' André; (yellow card) 87' Diogo Silva	Stadium: Estádio Serra Dourada; Attendance: 17,926 (paying); Referee: Marcos André da Penha

4 August 2013 Match 11	Vasco da Gama	2 – 3	Botafogo	Rio de Janeiro
18:30 BST	André 45+1', 48'; Yotún (yellow card) 38'; Pedro Ken (yellow card) 41'; Renato Silva (yellow card) 59'; Wendel (yellow card) 88'	Report; Report	24', 49' Rafael Marques; 31' Seedorf; (yellow card) 53' Bolívar; (yellow card) 89' Gabriel	Stadium: Estádio Mário Filho (Maracanã); Attendance: 33,419; Referee: Wagner Magalhães

8 August 2013 Match 12	Vasco da Gama	1 – 1	Ponte Preta	Rio de Janeiro
21:00 BST	André 57' (yellow card) 53'; Pedro Ken (yellow card) 54'	Report; Report	85' William; (yellow card) 15' Baraka; (yellow card) 77' Régis Souza; (yellow card) 78' Ramírez	Stadium: Estádio Vasco da Gama (São Januário); Attendance: 9,347; Referee: Emerson Almeida

11 August 2013 Match 13	Coritiba	0 – 1	Vasco da Gama	Curitiba
16:00 BST	Leandro Almeida (yellow card) 59'; Lincoln (yellow card) 65'	Report; Report	6' (yellow card) 57' Pedro Ken; (yellow card) 61' Abuda; (yellow card) 74' Juninho Pernambucano; (yellow card) 80' Rafael Vaz	Stadium: Estádio Major Antônio Couto Pereira; Referee: Leandro Vuaden

14 August 2013 Match 14	Santos	1 – 1	Vasco da Gama	Santos
19:30 BST	Edu Dracena 77'	Report; Report	90+2' Rafael Vaz	Stadium: Estádio Urbano Caldeira (Vila Belmiro); Attendance: 3,898 (paying); Referee: Edivaldo Elias

17 August 2013 Match 15	Vasco da Gama	2 – 3	Grêmio	Rio de Janeiro
21:00 BST	Alex Telles 26' (o.g.); André 87'; Tenorio (yellow card) 55'; Juninho Pernambucano (yellow card) 69'	Report; Report	6', 51' Barcos; 37' Ramiro; (yellow card) 28' Kléber; (yellow card) 55' Gabriel	Stadium: Estádio Vasco da Gama (São Januário); Attendance: 15,781; Referee: Wilton Sampaio

25 August 2013 Match 16	Vasco da Gama	1 – 1	Corinthians	Brasília
16:00 BST	André 55'; Abuda (yellow card) 37'; Fagner (yellow card) 53'; Pedro Ken (yellow card) 64'	Report; Report	4' (yellow card) 86' Guerrero; (yellow card) 42' Danilo; (yellow card) 62' Ibson; (yellow card) 66' Paulo André; (yellow card) 88' Ralf	Stadium: Estádio Nacional Mané Garrincha; Attendance: 21,627 (paying); Referee: Héber Lopes

1 September 2013 Match 17	Cruzeiro	5 – 3	Vasco da Gama	Belo Horizonte
18:30 BST	Willian 1'; Lucas Silva 33', 68' (yellow card) 53'; Júlio Baptista 39'; Vinícius Araújo 87' (yellow card) 88'; Everton Ribeiro (yellow card) 20'; Henrique (yellow card) 57'; Dagoberto (red card)	Report; Report	19', 44' Willie; 41' André; (yellow card) 16' Rafael Vaz; (yellow card) 65' Yotún; (yellow card) 70' Fagner	Stadium: Estádio Governador Magalhães Pinto (Mineirão); Attendance: 18,607; Referee: Flávio Rodrigues

5 September 2013 Match 18	Náutico	0 – 3	Vasco da Gama	São Lourenço da Mata
21:00 BST	William Alves (yellow card) 35'	Report; Report	48' Willie; 52', 90+2' Marlone; (yellow card) 32' André; (yellow card) 83' Abuda	Stadium: Estádio Governador Carlos Wilson Rocha de Queirós Campos (Arena Pernambuco); Attendance: 8,153; Referee: Jaílson Macedo

8 September 2013 Match 19	Vasco da Gama	0 – 0	Atlético Paranaense	Rio de Janeiro
18:30 BST	Juninho Pernambucano (yellow card) 35'; Fagner (yellow card) 45'; Baiano (yellow card) 66'	Report; Report	(yellow card) 37' Bruno Silva; (yellow card) 45' Dráusio	Stadium: Estádio Vasco da Gama (São Januário); Attendance: 11,832; Referee: Leandro Vuaden

11 September 2013 Match 20	Portuguesa	2 – 0	Vasco da Gama	São Paulo
21:50 BST	Corrêa 12'; Gilberto 76'; Matheus (yellow card) 25'; Souza (yellow card) 53'; Diogo (yellow card) 69'	Report; Report	(yellow card) 72' Abuda	Stadium: Estádio Doutor Osvaldo Teixeira Duarte (Canindé); Attendance: 4,207 (paying); Referee: Claudio Lima e Silva

15 September 2013 Match 21	Vasco da Gama	0 – 2	São Paulo	Rio de Janeiro
16:00 BST	Cris (yellow card) 18'	Report; Report	31' Rodrigo Caio; 70' Antônio Carlos; (yellow card) 7' Toloi	Stadium: Estádio Vasco da Gama (São Januário); Attendance: 10,973; Referee: Héber Lopes

18 September 2013 Match 22	Vasco da Gama	1 – 2	Vitória	Rio de Janeiro
19:30 BST	André 8'; Wendel (yellow card) 78'; Montoya (yellow card) 88'	Report; Report	81' Alemão; 90' Marquinhos; (yellow card) 3' Renato Cajá; (yellow card) 87' Escudero	Stadium: Estádio Vasco da Gama (São Januário); Attendance: 5,624; Referee: Célio Amorim

22 September 2013 Match 23	Atlético Mineiro	2 – 1	Vasco da Gama	Belo Horizonte
18:30 BST	Fernandinho 3'; Rafael Vaz 19' (o.g.); Ronaldinho (yellow card) 90+4'	Report; Report	73' Dakson; (yellow card) 34' Wendel	Stadium: Estádio Raimundo Sampaio (Independência); Attendance: 12,834 (paying); Referee: André Luiz Castro

29 September 2013 Match 24	Bahia	0 – 0	Vasco da Gama	Salvador, Bahia
16:00 BST	Lucas Fonseca (yellow card) 9'; Wallyson (yellow card) 90'	Report; Report	(yellow card) 49' Yotún; (yellow card) 60' Fagner; (yellow card) 69' Fillipe Soutto	Stadium: Complexo Esportivo Cultural Octávio Mangabeira (Fonte Nova); Attendance: 34,870; Referee: Wilson Seneme

3 October 2013 Match 25	Vasco da Gama	3 – 1	Internacional	Macaé
21:00 BST	Edmilson 10'; André 43' (yellow card) 51'; Willie 75'	Report; Report	19' Jorge Henrique; (yellow card) 42' D'Alessandro; (yellow card) 66' Juan	Stadium: Estádio Cláudio Moacyr de Azevedo (Moacyrzão); Attendance: 10,220; Referee: Luiz Flavio de Oliveira

6 October 2013 Match 26	Flamengo	1 – 1	Vasco da Gama	Brasília
16:00 BST	Hernane 33'; Wallace (yellow card) 17'; André Santos (yellow card) 50'	Report; Report	53' Willie; (yellow card) 27' Juninho Pernambucano; (yellow card) 51' Pedro Ken; (yellow card) 66' Jhon Cley; (yellow card) 86' Yotún	Stadium: Estádio Nacional Mané Garrincha; Attendance: 34,597 (paying); Referee: Ricardo Marques

9 October 2013 Match 27	Vasco da Gama	1 – 0	Fluminense	Florianópolis
21:45 BST	Cris 12'; Jomar (yellow card) 41'; Francismar (yellow card) 52'; Fillipe Soutto (yellow card) 59'	Report; Report	(yellow card) 55' Bruno; (yellow card) 67' Leandro Euzébio; (yellow card) 79' Gum	Stadium: Estádio Aderbal Ramos da Silva (Ressacada); Attendance: 8,245 (paying); Referee: Wagner Magalhães

13 October 2013 Match 28	Criciúma	3 – 2	Vasco da Gama	Criciúma
16:00 BST	Wellington Paulista 17', 54' (pen.); Lins 24'; Elton (yellow card) 15'; Sueliton (yellow card) 28'; Matheus Ferraz (yellow card) 49'; Serginho (yellow card) 90+1'; Daniel Carvalho (yellow card) 90+2'	Report; Report	20' Marlone; 50' (pen.) André; (yellow card) 53' Diogo Silva; (yellow card) 62' (yellow-red card) 62' Willie; (yellow card) 82' Cris	Stadium: Estádio Heriberto Hülse; Attendance: 13,426; Referee: André Luiz Castro

17 October 2013 Match 29	Vasco da Gama	0 – 2	Goiás	Macaé
19:30 BST	André (yellow card) 59'; Henrique (yellow card) 88'	Report; Report	37' Rodrigo; 68' Hugo; (yellow card) 27' David; (yellow card) 77' Amaral	Stadium: Estádio Cláudio Moacyr de Azevedo (Moacyrzão); Attendance: 7,766; Referee: Wilson Seneme

20 October 2013 Match 30	Botafogo	2 – 2	Vasco da Gama	Rio de Janeiro
18:30 BDT	Dankler 6'; Lodeiro 7'; Lucas Zen (yellow card) 89'	Report; Report	54' (yellow card) 25' Jomar; 68' Pedro Ken; (yellow card) 57' Nei; (yellow card) 59' Juninho Pernambucano	Stadium: Estádio Mário Filho (Maracanã); Attendance: 15,152; Referee: Wilton Sampaio

27 October 2013 Match 31	Ponte Preta	2 – 1	Vasco da Gama	Campinas
16:00 BDT	Adrianinho 80'; Uendel 90'; Ferron (red card)	Report; Report	17' (o.g.) Diego Sacoman; (yellow card) 57' Sandro Silva; (yellow card) 65' Reginaldo; (yellow card) 21' (yellow-red card) 86'	Stadium: Estádio Moisés Lucarelli; Attendance: 13,349 (paying); Referee: Sandro Ricci

2 November 2013 Match 32	Vasco da Gama	2 – 1	Coritiba	Macaé
19:30 BDT	Edmilson 27', 73' (yellow card) 65'; Abuda (yellow card) 71'; Wendel (yellow card) 76'; Renato Silva (yellow card) 82'	Report; Report	82' Luccas Claro; (yellow card) 43' Leandro Almeida; (yellow card) 45+1' Gil; (yellow card) 57' Carlinhos	Stadium: Estádio Cláudio Moacyr de Azevedo (Moacyrzão); Attendance: 6,615; Referee: Márcio Chagas

10 November 2013 Match 33	Vasco da Gama	2 – 2	Santos	Rio de Janeiro
19:30 BDT	Edmilson 29'; André 78' (yellow card) 79'; Yotún (yellow card) 86'	Report; Report	23' Bruno Peres; 27' Gustavo Henrique; (yellow card) 73' Willian José; (yellow card) 88' Geuvânio	Stadium: Estádio Mário Filho (Maracanã); Attendance: 56,756; Referee: Wilton Sampaio

13 November 2013 Match 34	Grêmio	1 – 0	Vasco da Gama	Porto Alegre
19:30 BDT	Rhodolfo 51'; Barcos (yellow card) 84'	Report; Report	(yellow card) 82' Pedro Ken	Stadium: Arena do Grêmio; Attendance: 14,840; Referee: Francisco do Nascimento

17 November 2013 Match 35	Corinthians	0 – 0	Vasco da Gama	São Paulo
17:00 BDT	Douglas (yellow card) 65'; Emerson (yellow card) 66'	Report; Report	(yellow card) 73' Guiñazú	Stadium: Estádio Municipal Paulo Machado de Carvalho (Pacaembu); Attendance: 20,734; Referee: Ricardo Marques

23 November 2013 Match 36	Vasco da Gama	2 – 1	Cruzeiro	Rio de Janeiro
19:30 BDT	Thalles 3'; Edmilson 33' (yellow card) 33'; Guiñazú (yellow card) 49'; Marlone (yellow card) 54'; Fagner (yellow card) 55'	Report; Report	65' Paulão	Stadium: Estádio Mário Filho (Maracanã); Attendance: 38,654; Referee: Marcos André da Penha

1 December 2013 Match 37	Vasco da Gama	2 – 0	Náutico	Rio de Janeiro
17:00 BDT	Edmilson 6'; Bernardo 87'; Guiñazú (yellow card) 25'; Robinho (yellow card) 77'; Luan (yellow card) 81'	Report; Report	(yellow card) 29' Alison; (yellow card) 34' Bruno Collaço; (yellow card) 45' Maranhão; (yellow card) 60' Martinez	Stadium: Estádio Mário Filho (Maracanã); Attendance: 55,914; Referee: Anderson Daronco

8 December 2013 Match 38	Atlético Paranaense	5 – 1	Vasco da Gama	Joinville
17:00 BDT	Paulo Baier 4'; Éderson 44', 81', 85'; Marcelo 63'	Report; Report	40' Edmilson; (yellow card) 41' Pedro Ken	Stadium: Arena Joinville; Attendance: 8,978 (paying); Referee: Ricardo Marques

=== Copa do Brasil ===
==== Copa do Brasil matches ====
20 August 2013 Round of 16:leg 1	Nacional	0 – 2	Vasco da Gama	Manaus
21:50 BST	Emerson (yellow card) 34'; Felipe (yellow card) 69'; Gilberto (yellow card) 87'; Andrezinho (yellow card) 88'; Rafael Morisco (red card)	Report; Report	44', 90+1' (pen.) Tenorio; (yellow card) 69' Fagner; (yellow card) 89' Montoya	Stadium: Estádio Roberto Simonsen (SESI); Referee: Dewson Fernando

29 August 2013 Round of 16:leg 2	Vasco da Gama	2 – 1 (4 – 1 agg.)	Nacional	Rio de Janeiro
21:50 BST	Marlone 33'; Dakson 89'; Fillipe Soutto (yellow card) 32'; Cris (yellow card) 74'; Fábio Lima (yellow card) 76'	Report; Report	8' (yellow card) 65' Danilo Rios; (yellow card) 83' Evandro	Stadium: Estádio Vasco da Gama (São Januário); Attendance: 8,100; Referee: Jean Pierre Gonçalves

25 September 2013 Quarterfinals:leg 1	Goiás	2 – 1	Vasco da Gama	Goiânia
21:45 BST	Walter 9' (pen.); Roni 75'; Amaral (yellow card) 42'	Report; Report	2' Edmilson	Stadium: Estádio Serra Dourada; Attendance: 15,278; Referee: Paulo César de Oliveira

24 October 2013 Quarterfinals:leg 2	Vasco da Gama	3 – 2 (4 – 4 (a) agg.)	Goiás	Rio de Janeiro
21:00 BST	Thalles 3', 17'; Willie 80'; Sandro Silva (yellow card) 30'; Pedro Ken (yellow card) 85'	Report; Report	19' Hugo; 56' (yellow card) 44' Amaral	Stadium: Estádio Mário Filho (Maracanã); Attendance: 36,061; Referee: Luiz Flávio de Oliveira

=== Friendlies ===
11 May 2013	Tupi	1 – 5	Vasco da Gama	Juiz de Fora
16:00 BST	Cassiano 59'; Silvio (yellow card) 55'; Rafael Estevam (yellow card) 55'	Report; Report	13', 29' Tenorio; 45+2' Dakson; 68' Edmilson; 79' (yellow card) 45' Renato Silva	Stadium: Estádio Municipal Radialista Mário Helênio; Attendance: 8,213; Referee: Renato Cardoso da Conceição

18 May 2013	Figueirense	1 – 2	Vasco da Gama	Florianópolis
16:00 BST	Bruno Pires 48'; Hildo (yellow card) 64'	Report; Report	37' Tenorio; 53' Alisson; (yellow card) 73' Thiaguinho; (yellow card) 77' Fillipe Soutto	Stadium: Estádio Orlando Scarpelli; Attendance: 3,297; Referee: Edmundo Alves do Nascimento

== Squad statistics ==
=== Appearances and goals ===
Last updated on 8 December 2013.

Players in italics have left the club during the season.

No.	Pos	Nat	Player	Total		Brasileirão Série A		Copa do Brasil		Rio de Janeiro State Championship	
No.	Pos	Nat	Player	Apps	Goals	Apps	Goals	Apps	Goals	Apps	Goals
1	GK	(Brazil) BRA	Michel Alves	12	0	8	0	1	0	2+1	0
4	DF	(Brazil) BRA	Nei	25	0	12	0	1	0	12	0
5	MF	(Argentina) ARG	Pablo Guiñazú	5	0	5	0	--	--	--	--
6	DF	(Peru) PER	Yoshimar Yotún	31	0	22+1	0	3+1	0	3+1	0
8	MF	(Brazil) BRA	Juninho Pernambucano	22	2	18+3	2	1	0	--	--
9	FW	(Brazil) BRA	André	27	12	19+8	12	--	--	--	--
10	MF	(Brazil) BRA	Pedro Ken	52	4	30+1	3	3+1	0	14+3	1
11	FW	(Ecuador) ECU	Carlos Tenorio	29	6	5+14	2	2	2	7+1	2
12	GK	(Brazil) BRA	Alessandro	24	0	8	0	1	0	15	0
13	DF	(Brazil) BRA	Cris	27	1	24	1	3	0	--	--
15	MF	(Brazil) BRA	Fillipe Soutto	26	0	12+2	0	4	0	6+2	0
16	MF	(Brazil) BRA	Francismar	5	0	4+1	0	--	--	--	--
17	MF	(Brazil) BRA	Wendel	43	0	21+5	0	1+1	0	14+1	0
18	DF	(Brazil) BRA	Rafael Vaz	14	3	14	3	--	--	--	--
19	FW	(Brazil) BRA	Edmilson	28	9	14+12	8	1+1	1	--	--
20	MF	(Colombia) COL	Santiago Montoya Muñoz	9	0	2+5	0	1+1	0	--	--
22	MF	(Brazil) BRA	Abuda	33	1	17+3	1	2	0	11	0
23	DF	(Brazil) BRA	Fagner	29	0	23+3	0	3	0	--	--
25	GK	(Brazil) BRA	Diogo Silva	24	0	22	0	2	0	--	--
28	DF	(Brazil) BRA	Jomar	22	1	19	1	3	0	--	--
30	MF	(Brazil) BRA	Marlone	34	4	23+3	3	2+1	1	0+5	0
31	MF	(Brazil) BRA	Bernardo	19	8	0+4	1	--	--	10+5	7
33	DF	(Brazil) BRA	Renato Silva	27	0	12+2	0	1	0	12	0
35	MF	(Brazil) BRA	Baiano	1	0	1	0	--	--	--	--
41	FW	(Brazil) BRA	Robinho	4	0	0+4	0	--	--	--	--
84	MF	(Brazil) BRA	Sandro Silva	24	0	13+4	0	1	0	6	0
87	MF	(Brazil) BRA	Dakson	30	5	6+8	2	1+1	1	4+10	2
91	FW	(Brazil) BRA	Reginaldo	10	0	2+6	0	1+1	0	--	--
93	FW	(Brazil) BRA	Willie	19	6	6+10	5	0+3	1	--	--
	DF	(Brazil) BRA	Rodolfo								
Youth academy's players who participated during the season: (Statistics shown are the appearances made and goals scored while at Vasco da Gama first squad)
14	DF	(Brazil) BRA	Luan	12	0	9	0	1	0	2	0
27	FW	(Brazil) BRA	Yago								
29	MF	(Brazil) BRA	Jhon Cley	13	0	4+3	0	2	0	4	0
32	MF	(Brazil) BRA	Guilherme								
36	DF	(Brazil) BRA	Dieyson	6	0	1	0	--	--	3+2	0
37	DF	(Brazil) BRA	Henrique	12	0	10+1	0	1	0	--	--
39	FW	(Brazil) BRA	Thalles	8	3	4+3	1	1	2	--	--
40	GK	(Brazil) BRA	Jordi								
	MF	(Brazil) BRA	Danilo								
Players who left the club during the season: (Statistics shown are the appearances made and goals scored while at Vasco da Gama)
16	DF	(Brazil) BRA	Douglas (traded to Dnipro Dnipropetrovsk)	1	0	--	--	--	--	1	0
26	DF	(Brazil) BRA	Dedé (traded to Cruzeiro)	14	4	--	--	--	--	14	4
13	DF	(Brazil) BRA	André Ribeiro (waived)	5	1	--	--	--	--	5	1
20	FW	(Brazil) BRA	Romário (loaned to F.C. Arouca)	7	1	--	--	--	--	3+4	1
18	DF	(Brazil) BRA	Thiago Feltri (released)	3	0	--	--	--	--	3	0
10	MF	(Brazil) BRA	Carlos Alberto (end of contract)	14	4	2	1	--	--	12	3
27	MF	(Brazil) BRA	Alisson (Cruzeiro loan contract released)	6	1	6	1	--	--	--	--
2	DF	(Brazil) BRA	Elsinho (Tombense loan contract released)	11	0	5	0	--	--	2+4	0
7	FW	(Brazil) BRA	Éder Luís (loaned to Al Nasr)	26	2	11	0	1	0	14	2
97	FW	(Brazil) BRA	Thiaguinho (released)	5	1	--	--	--	--	2+3	1
21	MF	(Brazil) BRA	Fellipe Bastos (loaned to Ponte Preta)	15	1	4+2	1	--	--	4+5	0
29	FW	(Brazil) BRA	Leonardo (Atlético Mineiro loan contract released)	6	1	0+2	0	--	--	2+2	1
38	MF	(Brazil) BRA	Fábio Lima (youth player, Atlético Goianiense contract released)	2	0	0+1	0	0+1	0	--	--

=== Goalkeeper statistics ===
No.	Nat.	Player	Total			Brasileirão Série A			Copa do Brasil			Rio de Janeiro State Championship		
No.	Nat.	Player	PLD	GA	GAA	PLD	GA	GAA	PLD	GA	GAA	PLD	GA	GAA
1	BRA	Michel Alves	11+1	22	1.83	8	17	2.12	1	2	2.00	2+1	3	1.00
12	BRA	Alessandro	24	34	1.41	8	12	1.50	1	2	2.00	15	20	1.33
25	BRA	Diogo Silva	24	33	1.37	22	32	1.45	2	1	0.50	0	0	0.00

Updated to match played 8 December 2013
Italic: denotes player is no longer with team

=== Top scorers ===
Ran	No.	Pos	Nat	Name	Brasileirão Série A	Copa do Brasil	Rio de Janeiro State Championship	Total
1	9	FW	(Brazil)	André	12	0	0	12
2	19	FW	(Brazil)	Edmilson	8	1	0	9
3	31	MF	(Brazil)	Bernardo	1	0	7	8
4	11	FW	(Ecuador)	Carlos Tenorio	2	2	2	6
4	93	FW	(Brazil)	Willie	5	1	0	6
6	87	MF	(Brazil)	Dakson	2	1	2	5
7	8/10	MF	(Brazil)	Pedro Ken	3	0	1	4
7	10	MF	(Brazil)	Carlos Alberto	1	0	3	4
7	26	DF	(Brazil)	Dedé	0	0	4	4
7	30	MF	(Brazil)	Marlone	3	1	0	4
11	18	DF	(Brazil)	Rafael Vaz	3	0	0	3
11	39	FW	(Brazil)	Thalles	1	2	0	3
13	7	FW	(Brazil)	Éder Luís	0	0	2	2
13	8	MF	(Brazil)	Juninho Pernambucano	2	0	0	2
15	13	DF	(Brazil)	Cris	1	0	0	1
15	13	DF	(Brazil)	André Ribeiro	0	0	1	1
15	20	FW	(Brazil)	Romário	0	0	1	1
15	21	MF	(Brazil)	Fellipe Bastos	1	0	0	1
15	22	FW	(Brazil)	Abuda	1	0	0	1
15	27	MF	(Brazil)	Alisson	1	0	0	1
15	28	DF	(Brazil)	Jomar	1	0	0	1
15	9/29	FW	(Brazil)	Leonardo	0	0	1	1
15	97	FW	(Brazil)	Thiaguinho	0	0	1	1
Own goals				(Brazil) Jean (FLU) 1; (Brazil) Alex Telles (GRE) 1; (Brazil) Ferron (PON) 1	2	0	1	3
				TOTALS	50	8	26	86

Last updated: 8 December 2013
Source: Competitive matches

Italic: denotes no longer with club.

=== Top assists ===
Ran	No.	Pos	Nat	Name	Brasileirão Série A	Copa do Brasil	Rio de Janeiro State Championship	Total
1	30	MF	(Brazil)	Marlone	5	1	0	6
2	6	DF	(Peru)	Yoshimar Yotún	2	2	0	4
2	7	FW	(Brazil)	Éder Luís	0	0	4	4
2	8	MF	(Brazil)	Juninho Pernambucano	4	0	0	4
2	8/10	MF	(Brazil)	Pedro Ken	2	0	2	4
2	23	DF	(Brazil)	Fagner	3	1	0	4
2	31	MF	(Brazil)	Bernardo	0	0	4	4
2	87	MF	(Brazil)	Dakson	2	0	2	4
9	11	FW	(Ecuador)	Carlos Tenorio	1	0	1	2
9	5/15	MF	(Brazil)	Fillipe Soutto	1	1	0	2
9	17	MF	(Brazil)	Wendel	2	0	0	2
9	19	FW	(Brazil)	Edmilson	2	0	0	2
9	97	FW	(Brazil)	Thiaguinho	0	0	2	2
14	2	DF	(Brazil)	Elsinho	1	0	0	1
14	13	DF	(Brazil)	Cris	1	0	0	1
14	14	DF	(Brazil)	Luan	1	0	0	1
14	22	MF	(Brazil)	Abuda	0	0	1	1
14	27	MF	(Brazil)	Alisson	1	0	0	1
14	9/29	FW	(Brazil)	Leonardo	0	0	1	1
14	29	MF	(Brazil)	Jhon Cley	1	0	0	1
14	38	MF	(Brazil)	Fábio Lima	0	1	0	1
14	41	FW	(Brazil)	Robinho	1	0	0	1
14	84	MF	(Brazil)	Sandro Silva	0	1	0	1
14	93	FW	(Brazil)	Willie	1	0	0	1
				TOTALS	31	7	17	55

Last updated: 1 December 2013
Source: Competitive matches

Those in italics are no longer with club.

=== Clean sheets ===
This list includes all competitive matches and is sorted by shirt number when total clean sheets are equal.

Ran	No.	Pos	Nat	Name	Brasileirão Série A	Copa do Brasil	Rio de Janeiro State Championship	Total
1	25	GK	(Brazil)	Diogo Silva	5	1	0	6
2	12	GK	(Brazil)	Alessandro	2	0	3	5
3	1	GK	(Brazil)	Michel Alves	1	0	0	1
				TOTALS	8	1	3	12

Last updated: 1 December 2013
Source: Competitive matches

Those in italics are no longer with club.

=== Disciplinary record ===
R	No.	Pos	Nat	Name	Brasileirão Série A			Copa do Brasil			Rio de Janeiro State Championship			Total		
R	No.	Pos	Nat	Name	Booked	(yellow card) (yellow-red card)	Sent off (straight red)	Booked	(yellow card) (yellow-red card)	Sent off (straight red)	Booked	(yellow card) (yellow-red card)	Sent off (straight red)	Booked	(yellow card) (yellow-red card)	Sent off (straight red)
1	8/10	MF	(Brazil)	Pedro Ken	7	0	0	1	0	0	1	0	0	9	0	0
1	17	MF	(Brazil)	Wendel	6	0	0	0	0	0	3	0	0	9	0	0
3	8	MF	(Brazil)	Juninho Pernambucano	7	0	0	0	0	0	0	0	0	7	0	0
3	9	FW	(Brazil)	André	7	0	0	0	0	0	0	0	0	7	0	0
5	6	DF	(Peru)	Yoshimar Yotún	6	0	0	0	0	0	0	0	0	6	0	0
5	22	MF	(Brazil)	Abuda	5	0	0	0	0	0	1	0	0	6	0	0
5	23	DF	(Brazil)	Fagner	5	0	0	1	0	0	0	0	0	6	0	0
5	33	DF	(Brazil)	Renato Silva	4	0	0	0	0	0	2	0	0	6	0	0
5	84	MF	(Brazil)	Sandro Silva	3	0	0	1	0	0	2	0	0	6	0	0
10	4	DF	(Brazil)	Nei	2	1	0	0	0	0	2	0	0	4	1	0
10	10	MF	(Brazil)	Carlos Alberto	1	0	0	0	0	0	4	0	0	5	0	0
12	5/15	MF	(Brazil)	Fillipe Soutto	2	0	0	1	0	0	1	0	0	4	0	0
12	28	DF	(Brazil)	Jomar	4	0	0	0	0	0	0	0	0	4	0	0
12	87	MF	(Brazil)	Dakson	1	0	0	0	0	0	3	0	0	4	0	0
15	2	DF	(Brazil)	Elsinho	2	0	0	0	0	0	1	0	0	3	0	0
15	5	MF	(Argentina)	Pablo Guiñazú	3	0	0	0	0	0	0	0	0	3	0	0
15	13	DF	(Brazil)	Cris	2	0	0	1	0	0	0	0	0	3	0	0
15	14	DF	(Brazil)	Luan	3	0	0	0	0	0	0	0	0	3	0	0
15	18	DF	(Brazil)	Rafael Vaz	3	0	0	0	0	0	0	0	0	3	0	0
15	21	MF	(Brazil)	Fellipe Bastos	1	0	0	0	0	0	2	0	0	3	0	0
21	7	FW	(Brazil)	Éder Luís	0	0	0	0	0	0	2	0	0	2	0	0
21	11	FW	(Ecuador)	Carlos Tenorio	1	0	0	0	0	0	1	0	0	2	0	0
21	13	DF	(Brazil)	André Ribeiro	0	0	0	0	0	0	2	0	0	2	0	0
21	19	FW	(Brazil)	Edmilson	2	0	0	0	0	0	0	0	0	2	0	0
21	20	MF	(Colombia)	Santiago Montoya Muñoz	1	0	0	1	0	0	0	0	0	2	0	0
21	25	GK	(Brazil)	Diogo Silva	2	0	0	0	0	0	0	0	0	2	0	0
21	26	DF	(Brazil)	Dedé	0	0	0	0	0	0	2	0	0	2	0	0
21	27	MF	(Brazil)	Alisson	2	0	0	0	0	0	0	0	0	2	0	0
21	29	MF	(Brazil)	Jhon Cley	1	0	0	0	0	0	1	0	0	2	0	0
21	31	MF	(Brazil)	Bernardo	0	0	0	0	0	0	2	0	0	2	0	0
21	37	DF	(Brazil)	Henrique	2	0	0	0	0	0	0	0	0	2	0	0
32	12	GK	(Brazil)	Alessandro	0	0	0	0	0	0	0	0	1	0	0	1
32	16	MF	(Brazil)	Francismar	1	0	0	0	0	0	0	0	0	1	0	0
32	18	DF	(Brazil)	Thiago Feltri	0	0	0	0	0	0	1	0	0	1	0	0
32	20	FW	(Brazil)	Romário	0	0	0	0	0	0	1	0	0	1	0	0
32	30	MF	(Brazil)	Marlone	1	0	0	0	0	0	0	0	0	1	0	0
32	35	MF	(Brazil)	Baiano	1	0	0	0	0	0	0	0	0	1	0	0
32	38	MF	(Brazil)	Fábio Lima	0	0	0	1	0	0	0	0	0	1	0	0
32	41	FW	(Brazil)	Robinho	1	0	0	0	0	0	0	0	0	1	0	0
32	91	FW	(Brazil)	Reginaldo	1	0	0	0	0	0	0	0	0	1	0	0
32	93	FW	(Brazil)	Willie	0	1	0	0	0	0	0	0	0	0	1	0
				TOTALS	90	2	0	7	0	0	34	0	1	131	2	1

Last updated: 8 December 2013
Source: Competitive matches

Those in italics are no longer with the club.

=== Captains ===
Accounts for all competitions. Last updated on 8 December 2013.

No.	Pos.	Name	Games
8	MF	(Brazil) Juninho Pernambucano	19
26	DF	(Brazil) Dedé	14
4	DF	(Brazil) Nei	7
13	DF	(Brazil) Cris	7
10	MF	(Brazil) Carlos Alberto	3
17	MF	(Brazil) Wendel	3
7	FW	(Brazil) Éder Luís	2
21	MF	(Brazil) Fellipe Bastos	1
23	DF	(Brazil) Fagner	1
84	MF	(Brazil) Sandro Silva	1

=== Team statistics ===
	Total	Home	Away	Classics
Games played	10	3	3	4
Games won	6	2	3	1
Games drawn	1	0	0	1
Games lost	3	1	0	2
Biggest win	Boavista v 0-3	4-2 v Macaé	Boavista v 0-3	3-2 v Fluminense
Biggest loss	2-4 v Flamengo	0-1 v Bangu	n/a	2-4 v Flamengo
Biggest win (League)	n/a	n/a	n/a	n/a
Biggest win (Cup)	n/a	n/a	n/a	n/a
Biggest win (State League)	Boavista v 0-3	4-2 v Macaé	Boavista v 0-3	3-2 v Fluminense
Biggest loss (League)	n/a	n/a	n/a	n/a
Biggest loss (Cup)	n/a	n/a	n/a	n/a
Biggest loss (State League)	2-4 v Flamengo	0-1 v Bangu	n/a	2-4 v Flamengo
Clean sheets	2	1	1	0
Goals scored	21	6	9	6
Goals conceded	14	3	3	8
Goal difference	+7	+3	+6	-2
Average GF per game	2,1	2	3	1,5
Average GA per game	1,4	1	1	2
Yellow cards	22	5	3	14
Red cards	0	0	0	0
Most appearances				
Top scorer	Bernardo (7)	Carlos Alberto (2)	Bernardo (5)	Bernardo; Dakson; Dedé; Pedro Ken (1); Romário
Worst discipline				
Penalties for	1/1	1/1	0/0	0/0
Penalties against	1/1	1/1	0/0	0/0
Points (League)				
Points rate	63,3%	67%	100%	33,3%

Last updated: 17 March 2013
Source: Competitive matches

=== International call-ups ===
No.	P	Name	Country	Level	Caps	Goals	Opposition	Competition	Source
6	DF	Yoshimar Yotún	Peru	Senior	4 Tot. 27	0 Tot. 0	vs. (Chile) Chile ✓ (March 22) vs. (Ecuador) Ecuador ✓ (June 7) vs. (Colombia) Colombia ✓ (June 11) vs. (Uruguay) Uruguay ✓ (September 6) vs. Venezuela (September 10) vs. Argentina (October 11) vs. (Bolivia) Bolivia ✓ (October 15)	2014 FIFA World Cup qualification	
6	DF	Yoshimar Yotún	Peru	Senior	4 Tot. 27	0 Tot. 0	vs. (Trinidad and Tobago) Trinidad and Tobago ✓ (March 26) vs. (South Korea) South Korea ✓ (August 14)	Friendly	
14	DF	Luan	Brazil	Under-20	1 Tot. 3	0 Tot. 0	vs. (Ecuador) Ecuador ✓ (January 10 – Group stage) vs. (Uruguay) Uruguay ✓ (January 12 – Group stage) vs. (Venezuela) Venezuela ✓ (January 16 – Group stage) vs. (Peru) Peru ✓ (January 18 – Group stage)	2013 South American Youth Championship	
26	DF	Dedé	Brazil	Senior	2 Tot. 8	0 Tot. 0	vs. (Italy) Italy^{INJ} (March 21) vs. (Russia) Russia^{INJ} (March 25) vs. (Bolivia) Bolivia ✓ (April 6) vs. (Chile) Chile ✓ (April 24)	Friendly	
	MF	Danilo	Brazil	Under-17	Tot.	Tot.	vs. (Slovakia) Slovakia ✓ (October 17 – Group stage) vs. (United Arab Emirates) United Arab Emirates ✓ (October 20 – Group stage) vs. (Honduras) Honduras ✓ (October 23 – Group stage) vs. (Russia) Russia ✓ (October 28 – Round of 16) vs. (Mexico) Mexico ✓ (November 1 – Quarterfinal)	2013 FIFA U-17 World Cup	

=== Starting eleven ===
All competitions.

No.	Pos.	Nat.	Name	MS	Notes
12	GK	(Brazil)	Alessandro	24	Diogo Silva has 24 starts Michel Alves has 11 starts
23	RB	(Brazil)	Fagner	26	Nei has 25 starts Elsinho has 7 starts
13	CB	(Brazil)	Cris	27	Jomar has 22 starts Dedé has 14 starts Luan has 12 starts
33	CB	(Brazil)	Renato Silva	25	Rafael Vaz has 14 starts André Ribeiro has 5 starts Douglas has 1 start
6	LB	(Peru)	Yotún	28	Henrique has 11 starts Dieyson has 4 starts Thiago Feltri has 3 starts
22	DM	(Brazil)	Abuda	30	Sandro Silva has 20 starts Guiñazú has 5 starts Baiano has 1 start
17	CM	(Brazil)	Wendel	36	Fillipe Soutto has 22 starts Fellipe Bastos has 8 starts
10	RM	(Brazil)	Pedro Ken	47	Juninho Pernambucano has 19 starts Jhon Cley has 10 starts
30	AM	(Brazil)	Marlone	25	Carlos Alberto has 14 starts Dakson has 11 starts Bernardo has 10 starts Francismar has 4 starts Montoya has 3 starts
93	SS	(Brazil)	Willie	6	Éder Luís has 26 starts Alisson has 6 starts Reginaldo has 3 starts Thiaguinho has 2 starts
9	ST	(Brazil)	André	19	Edmilson has 15 starts Tenorio has 14 starts Thalles has 5 starts Romário has 3 starts Leonardo has 2 starts

Last updated: 8 December 2013
Source: Squad statistics and Start formations
Only competitive matches.
Using the most used start formation.
Ordered by position on pitch (from back right to front left).

== See also ==
- 2013 Rio de Janeiro State Championship
- 2013 Brasileirão Série A
- 2013 Copa do Brasil
