= Abuda =

Abuda is a surname. Notable people with the surname include:

- Abuda (born 1986), Brazilian footballer
- Abuda (born 1989), Brazilian footballer
- Freddie Abuda (born 1969), Filipino basketball player
