= André Ribeiro =

André Ribeiro may refer to:

- André Ribeiro (racing driver) (1966–2021), Brazilian racing driver
- André Ribeiro (footballer, born 1988), Brazilian football defender
- André Ribeiro (footballer, born 1997), Portuguese football forward

== See also ==
- Andrew Ribeiro (born 1990), American soccer defender
