= Dakson =

Brazilian footballer (born 1987)

Personal information
- Full name: Dakson Soares da Silva
- Date of birth: 11 July 1987 (age 39)
- Place of birth: Santana do Ipanema, Brazil
- Height: 1.78 m (5 ft 10 in)
- Position: Attacking midfielder

Team information
- Current team: Sousa

Youth career
- 2002–2005: Campo Grande
- 2005–2006: Fluminense

Senior career*
Years	Team	Apps	(Gls)
2006–2012	Lokomotiv Plovdiv	122	(21)
2012–2014	Vasco da Gama	38	(6)
2015	Vitória	1	(0)
2015	Náutico	6	(0)
2016	CRB	11	(0)
2016–2017	Cuiabá	11	(2)
2018	Brusque	0	(0)
2019	ASA	0	(0)
2020–	Sousa	0	(0)
- * Club domestic league appearances and goals as of 21:22, 2 April 2020 (UTC)

Dakson Soares da Silva (born 11 July 1987), or simply Dakson, is a Brazilian footballer who currently plays for Sousa Esporte Clube as an attacking midfielder.

== Career ==
=== Lokomotiv Plovdiv ===
Dakson signed for Lokomotiv Plovdiv at the age of 19, in the summer of 2006. He made his competitive debut on 19 August 2006 against Slavia Sofia in the third round of the A PFG. He is regarded by many to be one of the best players in the Bulgarian Football League and a great prospect for the future. He has also expressed an interest in obtaining Bulgarian citizenship.

On 4 October 2009, in a match against Levski Sofia he saved his team the point with a brilliant equalizer in the added time of the second half, scoring from a free kick from a distance of about 40 meters. On 19 April 2010, Dakson played his hundredth match for Lokomotiv in a 0–0 away draw against Sliven 2000. On 25 March 2012, Dakson was sent off in a 3–0 home loss against CSKA Sofia after an altercation with Njongo Priso. In his last official match for Loko Plovdiv that was held on 11 July and was part of the 2012 Bulgarian Supercup competition, Dakson scored his team's only goal in the 1–2 loss against Ludogorets Razgrad.

=== Vasco da Gama ===
On 20 July 2012, Dakson signed for Vasco da Gama on a long-term contract for a fee believed to be around €180,000. He made his debut in the Campeonato Brasileiro Série A on 24 November, in a 1–1 home draw against Flamengo, coming on as a substitute for Jonathan Marlone. On 2 December, Dakson assisted Éder Luís for Vasco's second goal in a 2–1 away win over Fluminense.

He netted his first goal on 31 January 2013, in a 2–4 home loss against Flamengo in the Campeonato Carioca.

== Club statistics ==
As of 1 October 2017

Club	Season	League		State League		Cup		Continental		Other		Total	
Club	Season	Apps	Goals	Apps	Goals	Apps	Goals	Apps	Goals	Apps	Goals	Apps	Goals
Lokomotiv Plovdiv	2006–07	27	3	–	–	4	1	–	–	–	–	31	4
Lokomotiv Plovdiv	2007–08	29	5	–	–	3	2	–	–	–	–	32	7
Lokomotiv Plovdiv	2008–09	24	5	–	–	0	0	–	–	–	–	24	5
Lokomotiv Plovdiv	2009–10	21	4	–	–	0	0	–	–	–	–	21	4
Lokomotiv Plovdiv	Total	101	17	–	–	7	3	–	–	–	–	108	20
Lokomotiv Plovdiv	2011–12	21	4	–	–	4	1	–	–	–	–	25	5
Lokomotiv Plovdiv	2012–13	0	0	–	–	0	0	0	0	1 (Note: Bulgarian Supercup)	1	1	1
Lokomotiv Plovdiv	Total	21	4	–	–	4	1	0	0	1	1	26	6
Vasco da Gama	2012	2	0	0	0	0	0	–	–	–	–	2	0
Vasco da Gama	2013	14	2	14	2	2	1	–	–	–	–	30	5
Vasco da Gama	2014	22	4	2	0	5	0	–	–	–	–	29	4
Vasco da Gama	Total	38	6	16	2	7	1	–	–	–	–	61	9
Vitória	2015	1	0	3	0	1	0	–	–	1 (Note: Copa do Nordeste)	0	6	0
Náutico	2015	6	0	0	0	0	0	–	–	–	–	6	0
CRB	2016	11	0	12	1	3	1	–	–	7 (Note: Copa do Nordeste)	0	33	2
Cuiabá	2016	5	2	0	0	0	0	2 (Note: Copa Sudamericana)	1	–	–	7	3
Cuiabá	2017	6	0	0	0	3	0	–	–	2 (Note: Copa Verde)	0	11	0
Cuiabá	Total	11	2	0	0	3	0	2	1	2	0	18	3
Career Total		189	29	31	3	25	6	2	1	11	1	258	40

== Honours ==
CRB

- Campeonato Alagoano: 2016

Cuiabá

- Campeonato Mato-Grossense: 2017
