= Alisson (footballer, born 1993) =

Brazilian footballer

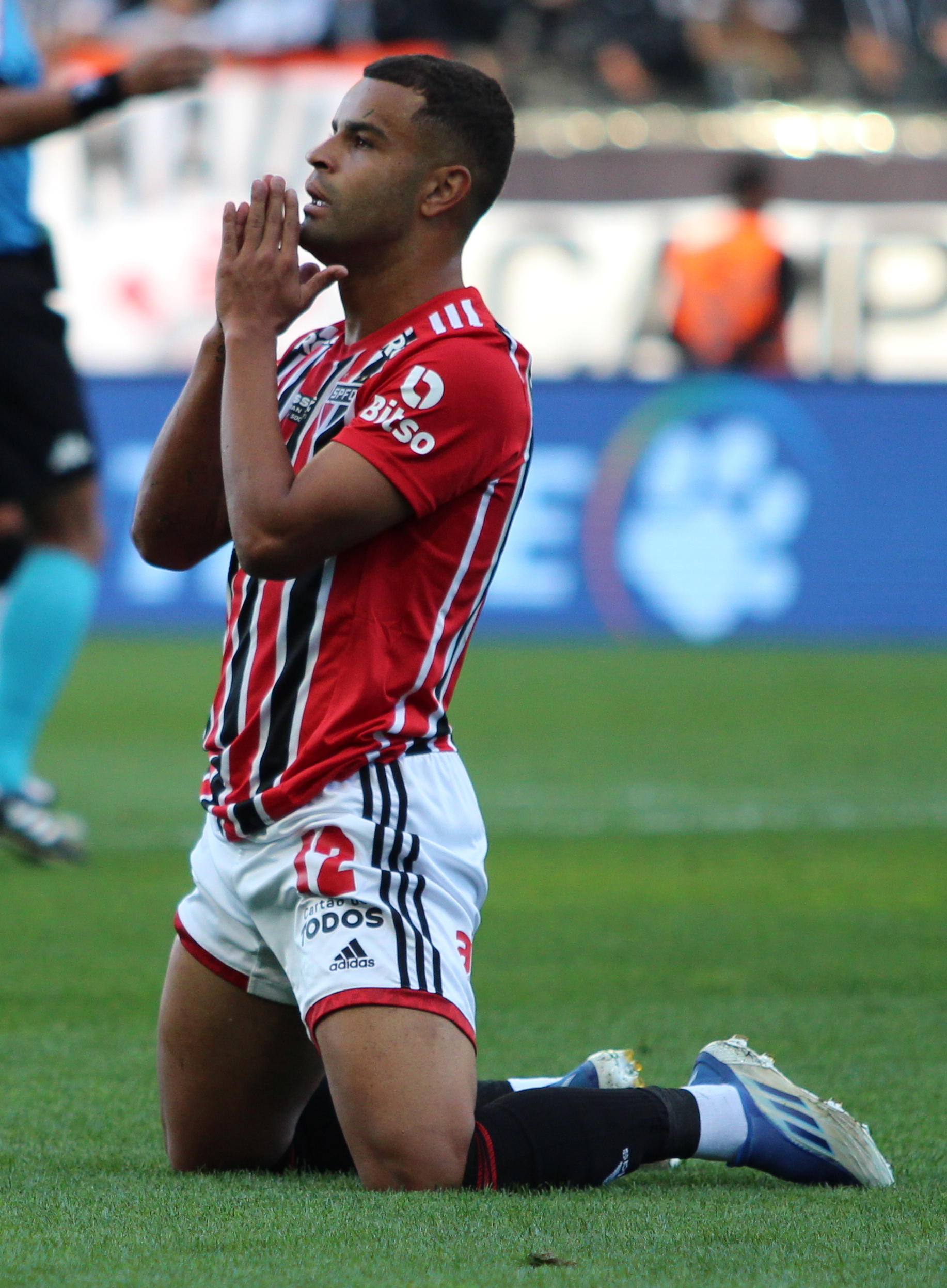
- Alisson in 2022

Personal information
- Full name: Alisson Euler de Freitas Castro
- Date of birth: 25 June 1993 (age 33)
- Place of birth: Rio Pomba, Brazil
- Height: 1.74 m (5 ft 8 1/2 in)
- Position: Midfielder

Team information
- Current team: Fluminense (on loan from São Paulo)
- Number: 25

Youth career
- 2007–2013: Cruzeiro
- 2008: → Cabofriense (loan)

Senior career*
Years	Team	Apps	(Gls)
2012–2017	Cruzeiro	126	(18)
2013	→ Vasco da Gama (loan)	6	(1)
2018–2021	Grêmio	138	(16)
2022–	São Paulo	141	(5)
2026–	→ Fluminense (loan)	8	(0)

International career^{‡}
2014	Brazil U20	5	(2)
- * Club domestic league appearances and goals as of 10:47, 2 May 2026 (UTC) ‡ National team caps and goals as of 1 June 2014

Alisson Euler de Freitas Castro (born 25 June 1993), simply known as Alisson, is a Brazilian professional footballer who plays as a midfielder for Campeonato Brasileiro Série A club Fluminense on loan from São Paulo.

== Club career ==
=== Cruzeiro ===
Born in Rio Pomba, Minas Gerais, Alisson joined Cruzeiro's youth setup in 2007, aged 13. He subsequently spent a year on loan at Cabofriense's under-17 side before returning and featured for the under-17 and under-20 teams.

Alisson made his first team – and Série A – debut on 18 November 2012, coming on as a second-half substitute for Walter Montillo in a 2–0 away win over Fluminense. He featured in a further two Campeonato Mineiro matches for the club before being loaned to Vasco da Gama on 18 April 2013, as a part of the deal which saw Dedé move to the opposite direction permanently.

While at the Cruzmaltino, Alisson scored his first professional goal, netting the opener in a 2–0 home win over Atlético Mineiro on 5 June 2013. On 6 August, however, after being rarely used, he returned to his parent club.

Back to Cruzeiro, Alisson featured in just nine league matches as the club lifted the Série A title. He scored his first goal for the club on 18 March 2014, netting the third of a 3–0 Mineiro away success over Tombense.

On 8 October 2016, Alisson played his 100th match for Cruzeiro, a 2–0 win over Ponte Preta.

=== Grêmio ===
In January 2018, Alisson moved to Grêmio on a four-year deal, with Edílson moving in the opposite direction. He made his debut for the club on 20 January, replacing Isaque in a 3–5 Campeonato Gaúcho home loss against Caxias.

Alisson scored his first goal for Tricolor on 7 February 2018, netting the equalizer in a 2–1 home win over Brasil de Pelotas. On 4 October of the following year, he renewed his contract until 2023.

On 30 January 2020, Alisson played his 100th match for Grêmio, a 2–1 home win over São José-RS.

=== São Paulo ===
In December 2021, Allison was officially announced by São Paulo, signing an initial contract until the end of 2024. He scored his first goals for the club during a defeat against Red Bull Bragantino and a victory over Corinthians, in matches of the third round and the semi-final of Campeonato Paulista, respectively. In 2022, a sprained right knee in July and muscle pain in the right thigh in October kept the player off the field for several months.

In 2023, he won the Copa do Brasil title, participating in nine of the ten matches played, and renewed his contract until the end of 2026.

== Career statistics ==
As of 16 December 2021

Club	Season	League			State League		National Cup		Continental		Other		Total	
Club	Season	Division	Apps	Goals	Apps	Goals	Apps	Goals	Apps	Goals	Apps	Goals	Apps	Goals
Cruzeiro	2012	Série A	1	0	—		—		—		—		1	0
Cruzeiro	2013	Série A	9	0	2	0	0	0	—		—		11	0
Cruzeiro	2014	Série A	15	3	5	1	2	0	1 (Note: Appearance(s) in Copa Libertadores)	0	—		23	4
Cruzeiro	2015	Série A	17	3	6	1	2	1	4	0	—		29	5
Cruzeiro	2016	Série A	20	4	11	3	7	0	—		2 (Note: Appearance(s) in Primeira Liga)	1	40	8
Cruzeiro	2017	Série A	27	2	13	1	14	2	1 (Note: Appearance(s) in Copa Sudamericana)	0	2	0	57	5
Cruzeiro	Total		89	12	37	6	25	3	6	0	4	1	161	22
Vasco da Gama (loan)	2013	Série A	6	1	—		—		—		—		6	1
Grêmio	2018	Série A	22	1	16	3	3	2	10	2	2 (Note: Appearance(s) in Recopa Sudamericana)	0	53	8
Grêmio	2019	Série A	22	4	8	1	5	1	10	2	—		45	8
Grêmio	2020	Série A	24	2	14	1	3	0	5	0	—		46	3
Grêmio	2021	Série A	29	3	3	1	3	0	6 (Note: Three appearances in Copa Libertadores, three appearances in Copa Sudamericana)	0	—		41	4
Grêmio	Total		97	10	41	6	14	3	31	4	2	0	185	23
Career total			192	23	78	12	39	6	37	4	6	1	352	46

== Honours ==
=== Club ===
Cruzeiro

- Campeonato Brasileiro Série A: 2013, 2014
- Campeonato Mineiro: 2014

Grêmio

- Recopa Sudamericana: 2018
- Campeonato Gaúcho: 2018, 2019, 2020, 2021

São Paulo

- Copa do Brasil: 2023
- Supercopa do Brasil: 2024

=== International ===
Brazil U20

- Toulon Tournament: 2014
