= 2009 Suruga Bank Championship =

Oita Trinita	Internacional
(Japan)	(Brazil)
1	2
- Date: August 5, 2009
- Venue: Kyushu Sekiyu Oil Dome, Ōita
- Referee: Myung Yong Choi (South Korea)

The 2009 Suruga Bank Championship (Japanese: スルガ銀行チャンピオンシップ2009; Spanish: Copa Suruga Bank 2009) was a match between the winners of the previous season's J. League Cup and the Copa Sudamericana. It was contested by the 2008 J. League Cup winner Japanese club Oita Trinita and the 2008 Copa Sudamericana champion Brazilian club Internacional.

Internacional won the match 2–1 to win their first Suruga Bank Championship, and their fifth international title.

== Summary ==
August 5, 2009
19:00 (UTC+9)

Oita Trinita (Japan)	1–2	(Brazil) Internacional
Higashi 60'	Report	Alecsandro 50'; Andrezinho 58'

Kyushu Sekiyu Oil Dome, Ōita
Referee: Myung Yong Choi (Korea)

Oita Trinita	Internacional

OITA TRINITA:
GK	1	(Japan) Shusaku Nishikawa
DF	6	(Japan) Masato Morishige (c)
DF	33	(Japan) Yoshiaki Fujita
DF	22	(Japan) Taikai Uemoto	(yellow card) 39'	(substituted off) 62'
LB	21	(Japan) Keigo Higashi		(substituted off) 91'
DMF	20	(Japan) Daisuke Takahashi
DMF	5	(Brazil) Edmílson
MF	17	(Brazil) Fernandinho		(substituted off) 46'
RB	27	(Japan) Koki Kotegawa		(substituted off) ?'
FW	8	(Japan) Mu Kanazaki
FW	30	(Japan) Yudai Inoue		(substituted off) 59'
Substitutes:
FW	19	(Japan) Shunsuke Maeda		(substituted in) 46'
MF	14	(Japan) Akihiro Ienaga		(substituted in) 59'
DF	2	(Japan) Shusuke Tsubouchi	(yellow card) 69'	(substituted in) 62'
MF	34	(Japan) Takashi Umeda		(substituted in) 91'
FW	18	(Japan) Takahiko Sumida		(substituted in) ?'
Manager:
(Serbia) Ranko Popović

INTERNACIONAL:
GK	12	(Brazil) Michel Alves
RB	2	(Brazil) Bolívar
DF	3	(Brazil) Índio
DF	13	(Uruguay) Gonzalo Sorondo (c)
LB	6	(Brazil) Kléber	(yellow card) 69'	(substituted off) 69'
DMF	8	(Brazil) Sandro
DMF	5	(Argentina) Pablo Guiñazú	(yellow card) 12'
MF	17	(Brazil) Andrezinho		(substituted off) 94'
MF	16	(Brazil) Giuliano		(substituted off) 76'
FW	7	(Brazil) Taison		(substituted off) 52'
FW	18	(Brazil) Alecsandro		(substituted off) 87'
Substitutes:
FW	9	(Ecuador) Luis Bolaños	(yellow card) 94'	(substituted in) 52'
LB	15	(Brazil) Marcelo Cordeiro		(substituted in) 69'
RB	10	(Brazil) Danilo Silva		(substituted in) 76'
DMF	14	(Brazil) Glaydson		(substituted in) 87'
DF	11	(Brazil) Danny Morais		(substituted in) 94'
Manager:
(Brazil) Tite

Assistant referees:
(South Korea) Min Byoung Choi
(South Korea) Soonyong Yoon
Fourth official:
(Japan) Ryuji Sato
