= Ferron (footballer) =

Brazilian footballer (born 1985)

Personal information
- Full name: Luiz Antonio Linhares Garcia
- Date of birth: 11 November 1985 (age 40)
- Place of birth: Rondonópolis, Brazil
- Height: 1.87 m (6 ft 1 1/2 in)
- Position: Centre back

Youth career
- União Bandeirante
- Atlético Mineiro

Senior career*
Years	Team	Apps	(Gls)
2005	Tubarão		
2006–2007	União Rondonópolis		
2007	Uberlândia		
2008	15 de Novembro		
2008	Rondonópolis		
2008–2009	Sun Pegasus		
2009	São José-SP		
2009	Mirassol		
2009–2010	São José-SP	8	(0)
2010	Ituiutaba	14	(0)
2011–2013	Ponte Preta	86	(5)
2014	Sport	13	(0)
2015	Figueirense	0	(0)
2015–2016	Ponte Preta	15	(1)
2016–2017	Criciúma	11	(1)
2017–2018	Uberlândia	7	(1)
2019	Taubaté	8	(0)
2020	Concórdia	0	(0)
2020–2021	Moto Club	7	(0)
2021	União Rondonópolis	3	(1)
- * Club domestic league appearances and goals

Luiz Antonio Linhares Garcia (born 11 November 1985), commonly known as Ferron, is a Brazilian former footballer who played as a central defender.

== Club career ==
Born in Rondonópolis, Mato Grosso, Ferron made his senior debuts with Tubarão, after representing União Bandeirante and Atlético Mineiro as a youth. In 2008, he moved abroad for the first time in his career, joining Hong Kong Premier League side Sun Pegasus FC.

Ferron returned to his homeland in the following year, after agreeing a deal with São José EC. After a short period with Mirassol he returned to São José in August 2009, remaining at the club until May of the following year.

In 2010 Ferron signed for Ituiutaba, appearing with the side in Série C. On 19 December 2010 he moved to Série B side Ponte Preta.

Ferron made his professional debut on 21 May 2011, starting in a 5–0 home routing over ASA, and scored his first goal six days later, but in a 1–3 away loss against Vila Nova. He finished the campaign with 30 appearances and three goals, as his side returned to Série A.

On 20 May 2012 Ferron made his debut in the main category of Brazilian football, playing the full 90 minutes in a 0–1 home loss against Atlético Mineiro. He scored his first goal in the top level on 22 July, netting his side's only in a 1–2 loss against Fluminense also at the Estádio Moisés Lucarelli.

On 12 December 2012 Ferron renewed with Ponte for a further year, but opted to leave the club roughly a year later, joining Sport Recife. On 22 December 2014, after appearing sparingly for the latter, he joined Figueirense.
