= Francismar =

Brazilian footballer (born 1984)

Personal information
- Full name: Francismar Carioca de Oliveira
- Date of birth: 18 April 1984 (age 42)
- Place of birth: Ubá, Brazil
- Height: 1.72 m (5 ft 8 in)
- Position: Attacking midfielder

Team information
- Current team: Ipatinga

Senior career*
Years	Team	Apps	(Gls)
2005–2007	América Mineiro	?	(?)
2005–2006	→ Cruzeiro (loan)	?	(?)
2007	→ Kawasaki Frontale (loan)	4	(0)
2008	Tokyo Verdy	0	(0)
2008	Cruzeiro		
2009	Juventude		
2009	Atlético Goianiense	12	(2)
2009–2010	Ipatinga	4	(1)
2010	Náutico	10	(2)
2011	Grêmio Prudente	0	(0)
2011	ASA	17	(2)
2012	Villa Nova	0	(0)
2012	Boa Esporte	34	(6)
2013	Penapolense	0	(0)
2013	Incheon United	0	(0)
2013–2014	Boa Esporte	18	(4)
2013	→ Vasco da Gama (loan)	5	(0)
2014–2015	Tombense	14	(4)
2015	Boavista	10	(0)
2015	Caldense	9	(2)
2016	Democrata-GV		
2016	Rio Claro	0	(0)
2017–2018	São Bernardo	9	(1)
2017	→ Ipatinga (loan)		
2018	Tombense	11	(0)
2019–	Ipatinga		
- * Club domestic league appearances and goals as of 01:05, 23 May 2019 (UTC)

Francismar Carioca de Oliveira (born 18 April 1984) is a Brazilian professional footballer who plays as an attacking midfielder for Ipatinga.

== Career ==
On 6 March 2009, Francismar left Esporte Clube Juventude to join Atlético Goianiense.

== Career statistics ==
Club performance			League		Cup		League Cup		Total	
Season	Club	League	Apps	Goals	Apps	Goals	Apps	Goals	Apps	Goals
Japan			League		Emperor's Cup		J.League Cup		Total	
2007	Kawasaki Frontale	J1 League	4	0	0	0	0	0	4	0
2008	Tokyo Verdy	J1 League	0	0	0	0	1	0	1	0
Country	Japan		4	0	0	0	1	0	5	0
Total			4	0	0	0	1	0	5	0

== Honours ==
- Campeonato Mineiro: 2006
- Campeonato Brasileiro Série D: 2014
