= Leonardo Luiz =

Brazilian footballer

Personal information
- Full name: Leonardo Vinicius Pereira Luiz
- Date of birth: 16 July 1987 (age 39)
- Place of birth: Rio de Janeiro, Brazil
- Height: 1.80 m (5 ft 11 in)
- Position: Defender

Senior career*
Years	Team	Apps	(Gls)
2008–2009	Fluminense		
2010–2011	Nova Iguaçu		
2012	Criciúma		
2012–2013	Volta Redonda	3	(0)
2014–2015	XV de Piracicaba		
2014	→ Náutico (loan)	6	(0)
2015	ABC	5	(1)
2016	Fortaleza	1	(0)
2017	Bangu	0	(0)
2018	Treze	0	(0)
2019	Santo André	0	(0)
2019	Artsul	0	(0)
- * Club domestic league appearances and goals as of 17:07, 21 January 2020 (UTC)

Leonardo Vinicius Pereira Luiz (born July 16, 1987 in Rio de Janeiro), known as Leonardo Luiz, is a Brazilian footballer who most recently played as defender for Artsul.

== Career statistics ==
As of 21 September 2019

Club	Season	League			State League		Cup		Conmebol		Other		Total	
Club	Season	Division	Apps	Goals	Apps	Goals	Apps	Goals	Apps	Goals	Apps	Goals	Apps	Goals
Nova Iguaçu	2011	Carioca	—		16	1	—		—		—		16	1
Volta Redonda	2012	Série D	3	0	2	0	—		—		—		5	0
Volta Redonda	2013	Carioca	—		15	0	2	0	—		—		17	0
Volta Redonda	Subtotal		3	0	17	0	2	0	—		—		22	0
Náutico	2014	Série B	6	0	3	0	3	0	—		—		12	0
XV de Piracicaba	2014	Paulista	—		14	1	—		—		—		14	1
XV de Piracicaba	2015	Paulista	—		16	0	—		—		—		16	0
XV de Piracicaba	Subtotal		—		30	1	—		—		—		30	1
ABC	2015	Série B	5	0	—		—		—		—		5	0
Fortaleza	2016	Série C	1	0	6	1	0	0	—		3 (Note: Appearances in 2016 Copa do Nordeste.)	0	10	1
Bangu	2017	Carioca	—		7	0	—		—		—		7	0
Treze	2018	Paraibano	—		8	1	1	0	—		6 (Note: Appearances in 2018 Copa do Nordeste.)	1	15	2
Santo André	2019	Paulista A2	—		7	0	—		—		—		7	0
Artsul	2019	Carioca B1	—		6	0	—		—		—		6	0
Career total			15	0	100	3	6	0	0	0	9	0	130	3
