= Willie (footballer) =

Brazilian footballer (born 1993)

Personal information
- Full name: Willie Hortencio Barbosa
- Date of birth: 15 May 1993 (age 33)
- Place of birth: Caravelas, Brazil
- Height: 1.70 m (5 ft 7 in)
- Position: Attacking midfielder

Team information
- Current team: Independiente
- Number: 93

Youth career
- 2009–2013: Vitória

Senior career*
Years	Team	Apps	(Gls)
2012–2016	Vitória	40	(5)
2013	→ Vasco da Gama (loan)	16	(5)
2015	→ América Mineiro (loan)	3	(0)
2015	→ Atlético Goianiense (loan)	21	(2)
2016	→ Red Bull Brasil (loan)	7	(0)
2016	Bragantino	0	(0)
2016–2017	Botoșani	12	(2)
2017	Apollon Smyrnis	11	(1)
2017–2018	Servette	28	(10)
2019	Ceará	2	(0)
2019	CRB	30	(5)
2020–2021	The Strongest	49	(25)
2022	Ironi Kiryat Shmona	6	(0)
2022	CRB	2	(0)
2022	Wilstermann	17	(4)
2023	UTA Arad	11	(0)
2024	Santa Cruz	0	(0)
2024	Jiangxi Lushan	26	(5)
2025-	Independiente	23	(5)
- * Club domestic league appearances and goals as of 30 December 2025

Willie Hortencio Barbosa (born 15 May 1993), commonly known as Willie, is a Brazilian professional footballer who plays as an attacking midfielder for Bolivian Primera División club Independiente.

== Career ==
On 30 November 2023, Willie joined Campeonato Pernambucano club Santa Cruz.

On 2 February 2024, Willie joined China League One club Jiangxi Lushan.

== Honours ==
Vitória

- Campeonato Baiano: 2013

Apollon Smyrnis

- Football League: 2016–17

Ceará

- Campeonato Cearense runner-up: 2017
