= Nei (footballer, born 1985) =

Brazilian footballer

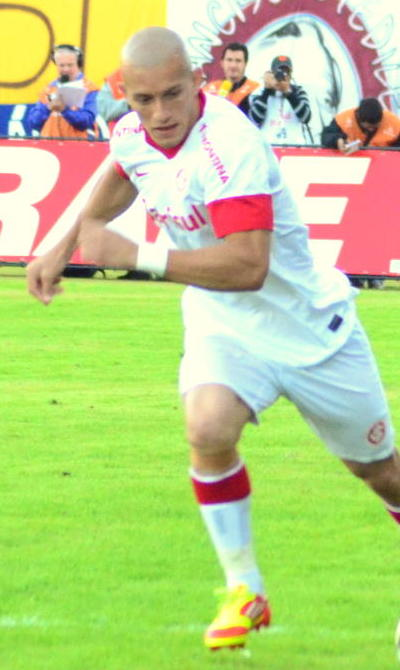
- Nei in 2012

Personal information
- Full name: Claudinei Cardoso Félix Silva
- Date of birth: 6 December 1985 (age 40)
- Place of birth: Bragança Paulista, Brazil
- Height: 1.75 m (5 ft 9 in)
- Position: Right-back

Youth career
- 1998–1999: Palmeiras

Senior career*
Years	Team	Apps	(Gls)
2000–2002	Bragantino	0	(0)
2003–2005	Ponte Preta	0	(0)
2005–2006	Corinthians	0	(0)
2006	Ponte Preta	26	(0)
2007–2009	Atlético-PR	56	(1)
2010–2012	Internacional	122	(2)
2013–2015	Vasco da Gama	27	(0)
2016	Paraná	13	(0)
2017	Almirante Barroso	17	(0)
2018	Prudentópolis	15	(3)
Total		276	(6)
- * Club domestic league appearances and goals

Claudinei Cardoso Félix Silva (born 6 December 1985), known as Nei, is a Brazilian former professional footballer who played as a right-back.

== Career ==
Nei was born in Bragança Paulista. On 22 December 2009, Internacional officialized the purchase of right backwing, who was formerly playing for Atlético-PR, the deal between Nei and the Brazilian club is due to last until December 2012.

Nei scored his first goal for Internacional on 23 February 2010 in Copa Libertadores match versus Club Sport Emelec. He played for Internacional at the 2010 FIFA Club World Cup.

On 4 December 2012, after 157 games and 5 goals, Nei did not renew his contract with Internacional, and then is currently unattached.

== Honours ==
Atlético Paranaense

- Campeonato Paranaense: 2009

Internacional

- Copa Libertadores: 2010
- Campeonato Gaúcho: 2011, 2012
- Recopa Sudamericana: 2011
