= Marcelinho (footballer, born 1983) =

Brazilian footballer

Personal information
- Full name: Marcelo Luis de Almeida Carmo
- Date of birth: 16 February 1983 (age 43)
- Place of birth: Juiz de Fora, Brazil
- Height: 1.80 m (5 ft 11 in)
- Position: Right back

Team information
- Current team: Nova Iguaçu
- Number: 2

Youth career
- 2003–2005: América-MG

Senior career*
| Years | Team | Apps | (Gls) |
| 2006 | Flamengo (Loan) | | |
| 2007 | Atlético Mineiro | | |
| 2007 | CRB (Loan) | | |
| 2008 | Ceará | | |
| 2008–2009 | Paulista | | |
| 2009–2010 | Tupi | | |
| 2010–2011 | Ipatinga | 8 | (0) |
| 2011 | Boa Esporte | 18 | (0) |
| 2012– | Nova Iguaçu | | |
- * Club domestic league appearances and goals

Marcelo Luis de Almeida Carmo (born 16 February 1983), or simply Marcelinho, is a Brazilian footballer who plays as a right back for Nova Iguaçu Futebol Clube.

== Honours ==
- Brazilian Cup: 2006

== Contract ==
- CRB (Loan) 3 May 2007 to 30 November 2007
- Atletico Mineiro 2 May 2007 to 31 December 2007
