= Fillipe Soutto =

Brazilian footballer (born 1991)

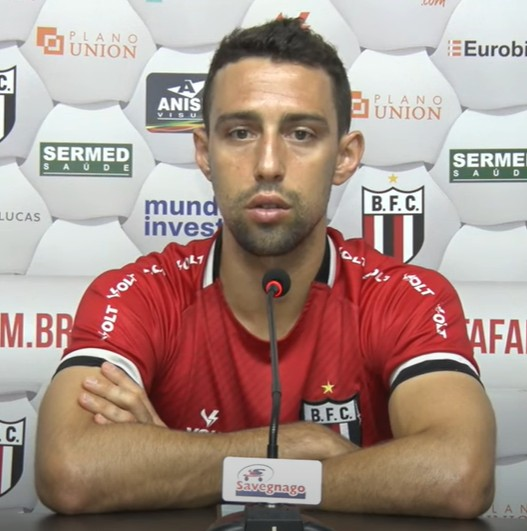
- Soutto in 2022

Personal information
- Full name: Fillipe Soutto Mayor Nogueira Ferreira
- Date of birth: 11 March 1991 (age 35)
- Place of birth: Belo Horizonte, Brazil
- Height: 1.78 m (5 ft 10 in)
- Position: Defensive midfielder

Team information
- Current team: Botafogo-SP

Youth career
- Atlético Mineiro

Senior career*
Years	Team	Apps	(Gls)
2010–2016	Atlético Mineiro	53	(3)
2013	→ Vasco da Gama (loan)	26	(0)
2014	→ Joinville (loan)	9	(0)
2015–2016	→ Náutico (loan)	36	(1)
2016	→ Linense (loan)	12	(0)
2016	→ Londrina (loan)	14	(0)
2017	Red Bull Brasil	15	(1)
2017–2018	Vitória	35	(0)
2020–2021	Ituano	36	(3)
2021	Brusque	20	(0)
2022–	Botafogo-SP	55	(3)
- * Club domestic league appearances and goals as of 29 April 2023

Fillipe Soutto Mayor Nogueira Ferreira (born 11 March 1991), better known as Fillipe Soutto, is a Brazilian footballer who plays as a defensive midfielder for Botafogo-SP.

He is one of several players revealed in the basic categories of Atlético Mineiro.

== Career ==
Fillipe arrived in the main group of the Atlético Mineiro in 2010 in the Copa U-23, a competition held among ten clubs in Series A Brazilian football.

On 19 December 2012, in an exchange for Alecsandro, Souto signed with Club de Regatas Vasco da Gama for 2013 season.

== Career statistics ==
As of 13 February 2017

Club	Season	National League			State League		National Cup		Continental		Other		Total	
Club	Season	Division	Apps	Goals	Apps	Goals	Apps	Goals	Apps	Goals	Apps	Goals	Apps	Goals
Atlético Mineiro	2010	Série A	2	0	–		–		–		–		2	0
Atlético Mineiro	2011	Série A	25	2	7	0	1	0	1	0	–		34	2
Atlético Mineiro	2012	Série A	8	0	7	0	3	0	–		–		18	0
Atlético Mineiro	2014	Série A	3	0	0	0	0	0	0	0	–		3	0
Atlético Mineiro	Subtotal		38	2	14	0	4	0	1	0	–		57	2
Vasco da Gama	2013	Série A	14	0	8	0	4	0	–		–		26	0
Joinville	2014	Série B	9	0	–		–		–		–		9	0
Náutico	2015	Série B	18	0	9	0	2	0	–		5 (Note: All appearance(s) in Copa do Nordeste)	1	34	1
Linense	2016	Série D	–		11	0	1	0	–		–		12	0
Londrina	2016	Série B	14	0	–		–		–		–		14	0
Red Bull Brasil	2017	Paulista	–		3	0	–		–		–		3	0
Total			93	2	45	0	11	0	1	0	5	1	155	3

== Honours ==
Atlético Mineiro

- Campeonato Mineiro: 2012

Joinville

- Campeonato Brasileiro Série B: 2014
