= Pedro Ken =

Brazilian footballer

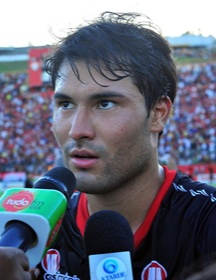

Personal information
- Full name: Pedro Ken Morimoto Moreira
- Date of birth: 20 March 1987 (age 39)
- Place of birth: Curitiba, Brazil
- Height: 1.81 m (5 ft 11 in)
- Position: Midfielder

Youth career
- 2006–2007: Coritiba

Senior career*
Years	Team	Apps	(Gls)
2006–2009	Coritiba	74	(2)
2010–2015	Cruzeiro	40	(0)
2011	→ Avaí (loan)	26	(2)
2012	→ Vitória (loan)	30	(5)
2013–2014	→ Vasco da Gama (loan)	85	(4)
2015	→ Coritiba (loan)	14	(1)
2015	→ Vitória (loan)	27	(1)
2016–2017	Terek Grozny	6	(0)
2017–2019	Ceará	74	(4)
2020	Juventude	9	(0)
2020–2021	Operário Ferroviário	41	(2)

International career
2007	Brazil U23	1	(0)
- * Club domestic league appearances and goals

Pedro Ken Morimoto Moreira (born 20 March 1987), known as Pedro Ken, is a Brazilian former footballer. He is of Japanese descent.

== Career ==
=== Club ===
Pedro Ken was born in Curitiba, Paraná. In 2007, when Coritiba won the Série B, Pedro Ken, Keirrison and Henrique were called Trio de Ouro (in English: Golden Trio) because of their important role in the championship, young age and good prospects.

On 7 December 2009 Pedro Ken left Coritiba to sign for league rival Cruzeiro. He signed a five-year contract with the club.

On 1 June 2011 Pedro Ken joined Avaí on a season-long loan deal.

On 22 December 2012, on an exchange for Nílton, Cruzeiro loaned Ken for Club de Regatas Vasco da Gama until the end of 2013 season.

In January 2016, Ken went on trial with FC Terek Grozny, going on to sign a 2.5-year contract with Terek on 3 February 2016. He left the club in March 2017.

=== International ===
Pedro played once for the Olympic National Team in a commemorative match against the Brasileirão's best players. He did not score in that game.

== Honours ==
Coritiba

- Campeonato Brasileiro Série B: 2007
- Campeonato Paranaense: 2008

Cruzeiro

- Campeonato Mineiro: 2011

Ceará

- Campeonato Cearense: 2018
