= Robinho (footballer, born September 1987) =

Brazilian footballer

Personal information
- Full name: Robert Brito Luciano
- Date of birth: 8 September 1987 (age 39)
- Place of birth: Volta Redonda, Brazil
- Height: 1.76 m (5 ft 9 in)
- Position: Winger

Youth career
- 2001–2007: Volta Redonda

Senior career*
Years	Team	Apps	(Gls)
2007–2009	Volta Redonda	0	(0)
2009–2010	Vasco da Gama	14	(2)
2010–2011	Al Sharjah	9	(1)
2011–2012	União Leiria	8	(0)
2012	Guarani	2	(0)
2013	Vasco da Gama	4	(0)
2014	Boa	0	(0)
2015	Madureira	0	(0)
2015	Drogheda United		
2015–2017	Olympique Safi	33	(8)
2017–2019	Al-Mesaimeer		
2018–2019	→ Olympique Safi (loan)		
2019	Volta Redonda	0	(0)
2019	Nahdat Zemamra	1	(0)
2020–	Youssoufia Berrechid	0	(0)
- * Club domestic league appearances and goals

Robert Brito Luciano or simply Robinho (born 8 September 1987 in Volta Redonda) is a Brazilian professional footballer who plays as a winger.
