= Michel Alves =

Brazilian footballer

Personal information
- Full name: Michel Aluzio da Cruz Alves
- Date of birth: March 25, 1981 (age 45)
- Place of birth: Pelotas, Brazil
- Height: 1.88 m (6 ft 2 in)
- Position: Goalkeeper

Senior career*
Years	Team	Apps	(Gls)
2000–2004	Brasil de Pelotas	10	(0)
2005	Vila Nova	12	(0)
2006–2008	Juventude	88	(0)
2009	Internacional	7	(0)
2010	Ceará	21	(0)
2011	Vila Nova	33	(0)
2012	Criciúma	21	(0)
2013–2014	Vasco da Gama	11	(0)
2016–2017	Botafogo–PB	71	(0)
2018	Novo Hamburgo	8	(0)
2018	CRAC	12	(0)
- * Club domestic league appearances and goals as of September 11, 2010 ‡ National team caps and goals as of September 11, 2010

Michel Aluzio da Cruz Alves, better known as Michel Alves (Pelotas, 25 April 1981) is a Brazilian football player acting as goalkeeper. He plays for Botafogo da Paraíba

== Career ==
He started in the youth of Brazil Pelotas, was also active in Vila Nova-GO before moving to the Youth. When he reached the youth took a year without playing in the reserve at least one game. But the reward came in 2007 when, despite the club being relegated in the Brazilian Championship, he was one of the goalkeepers melhors championship, arousing interest in several clubs. But with a huge account with the club and the fans, he chose to stay at the club saw.

In late 2008, the youth decided not to renew his contract in a process of cutting spending. Eventually moved to the International, where he became immediate booking of Lauro. Holder was in important matches such as the Copa Suruga Bank 2009.

In 2010, he left Inter and moved to Ceará Sporting Club.

== Honours ==
Vila Nova

- Campeonato Goiano: 2005

Internacional

- Campeonato Gaúcho: 2009
- Suruga Bank Championship: 2009

Botafogo da Paraíba

- Campeonato Paraibano: 2017

== Contract ==
- Ceará.
