= Diogo Silva (footballer, born 1986) =

Brazilian footballer

Personal information
- Full name: Diogo José Gonçalves da Silva
- Date of birth: 8 July 1986 (age 40)
- Place of birth: Cuiabá, Brazil
- Height: 1.92 m (6 ft 4 in)
- Position: Goalkeeper

Team information
- Current team: Ponte Preta
- Number: 12

Youth career
- 2000–2004: Vitória

Senior career*
Years	Team	Apps	(Gls)
2005–2011	Nova Iguaçu	50	(0)
2007–2008	→ Mesquita (loan)	1	(0)
2009	→ Bangu (loan)	12	(0)
2009–2010	→ Juventude (loan)	0	(0)
2011	→ Bangu (loan)	12	(0)
2011–2012	→ Vasco da Gama (loan)	0	(0)
2012–2016	Vasco da Gama	35	(0)
2015	→ XV de Piracicaba (loan)	6	(0)
2016–2018	Luverdense	104	(0)
2018–2021	Ceará	40	(0)
2021–2023	CRB	136	(3)
2024	Paysandu	21	(0)
2025–	Ponte Preta	41	(1)
- * Club domestic league appearances and goals as of 30 January 2026

Diogo José Gonçalves da Silva (born 8 July 1986) is a Brazilian footballer who plays as a goalkeeper for Ponte Preta.

== Honours ==
Nova Iguaçu

- Copa Rio: 2008

Vasco da Gama

- Copa do Brasil: 2011
- Campeonato Carioca: 2016

Luverdense

- Copa Verde: 2017

CRB

- Campeonato Alagoano: 2022, 2023

Paysandu

- Copa Verde: 2024

== List of goals scored ==
Following, is the list with the goals scored by Diogo Silva:

#	Date	Venue	Host team	Result	Away team	Competition	Score	Type
1	13 August 2022	Estádio Rei Pelé, Maceió	CRB	2–0	Grêmio	2022 Campeonato Brasileiro Série B	1–0	Penalty kick
2	13 August 2022	Estádio Rei Pelé, Maceió	CRB	2–0	Grêmio	2022 Campeonato Brasileiro Série B	2–0	Penalty kick
3	15 January 2023	Estádio Rei Pelé, Maceió	CRB	2–1	Cruzeiro de Arapiraca	2023 Campeonato Alagoano	2–1	Penalty kick
4	4 February 2023	Estádio dos Aflitos, Recife	Náutico	2–2	CRB	2023 Copa do Nordeste	2–2	Penalty kick
5	26 August 2025	Estádio Rei Pelé, Maceió	CSA	1–2	Ponte Preta	2025 Campeonato Brasileiro Série B	0–2	Penalty kick
