= Leonardo (footballer, born 1982) =

Brazilian footballer

Personal information
- Full name: Leonardo Gonçalves Silva
- Date of birth: October 26, 1982 (age 44)
- Place of birth: Nova Lima, Brazil
- Height: 1.85 m (6 ft 1 in)
- Position: Forward

Youth career
- 2002–2003: Villa Nova

Senior career*
Years	Team	Apps	(Gls)
2003	Criciúma	24	(6)
2004–2005	Vitória	4	(0)
2006–2009	Paraná	25	(7)
2007	→ Flamengo (loan)	14	(3)
2009	→ Avaí (loan)	8	(0)
2010	Avaí	8	(0)
2010	→ Coritiba (loan)	20	(8)
2011–2012	Coritiba	28	(9)
2012	→ Guangzhou R&F (loan)	3	(0)
2012–2016	Atlético Mineiro	13	(4)
2013	→ Vasco da Gama (loan)	1	(0)
2013	→ Ponte Preta (loan)	8	(3)
2014	→ Sport (loan)	7	(0)
- * Club domestic league appearances and goals

Leonardo Gonçalves Silva or simply Leonardo (born October 26, 1982) is a Brazilian former professional footballer who played as a forward.

== Honours ==
- Bahia State League: 2004, 2005
- Paraná State League: 2006
- Rio State Championship: 2007
- Taça Guanabara: 2007
- Rio State Championship: 2007
