= Sandro Silva (footballer) =

Brazilian footballer

Personal information
- Full name: Sandro Laurindo da Silva
- Date of birth: 29 April 1984 (age 42)
- Place of birth: Rio de Janeiro, Brazil
- Height: 1.86 m (6 ft 1 in)
- Position: Midfielder

Senior career*
Years	Team	Apps	(Gls)
2007–2008	Mirassol	15	(1)
2008–2010	Palmeiras	43	(2)
2010	→ Botafogo (loan)	3	(0)
2010–2012	Málaga	24	(0)
2011–2012	→ Internacional (loan)	8	(0)
2012	→ Cruzeiro (loan)	11	(0)
2013–2016	Vasco da Gama	17	(0)
2015	→ Bragantino (loan)	4	(0)
2016	→ Oeste (loan)	0	(0)
2017	Portuguesa	0	(0)
- * Club domestic league appearances and goals as of 30 March 2016

Sandro Laurindo da Silva (born 29 April 1984 in Rio de Janeiro), known as Sandro Silva, is a Brazilian former footballer who played as a midfielder.

== Career ==
On 10 February 2010, Botafogo reduce the time for sign the midfielder of Palmeiras, the player would arrive on loan until May 2011. However, in the summer 2010 he was snapped by Málaga CF for a transfer fee of €2.2 million.

During the next summer, he was loaned back to Brazil. This time to Internacional with an option to buy for €2 million after the season.

=== Position ===
Silva played as a defensive midfielder, but could also play as a central midfielder or a right back.

== Honours ==
Botafogo

- Campeonato Carioca: 2010

Internacional

- Campeonato Gaúcho: 2012

== Family ==
Relation to Mixed Martial Arts Fighter Seyandro Silva
