= Abuda (footballer, born 1989) =

Brazilian footballer

Personal information
- Full name: Jucimar Lima Pacheco
- Date of birth: 22 January 1989 (age 37)
- Place of birth: Vitória, Brazil
- Height: 1.76 m (5 ft 9 in)
- Position: Defensive midfielder

Team information
- Current team: Futebol Clube Santa Cruz

Youth career
- 2008: Paysandu
- 2009: Tuna Luso

Senior career*
| Years | Team | Apps | (Gls) |
| 2008 | Paysandu | | |
| 2009 | Tuna Luso | | |
| 2010 | Ferroviária | | |
| 2010 | Francana | | |
| 2010 | Batatais | | |
| 2011 | Petrolina | 15 | (0) |
| 2011–2012 | Cruzeiro-RS | 22 | (4) |
| 2012–2014 | Vasco da Gama | 43 | (1) |
| 2014–2015 | Chapecoense | 36 | (2) |
| 2015–2016 | Gaziantepspor | 31 | (0) |
| 2016 | Ponte Preta | 8 | (0) |
| 2017 | Atlético Goianiense | 13 | (0) |
| 2017–2018 | Figueirense | 18 | (0) |
| 2018 | → São Bento (loan) | 4 | (0) |
| 2019 | Cabofriense | 7 | (0) |
| 2019–2020 | Al-Mujazzal | 15 | (0) |
| 2020 | Sampaio Corrêa | 0 | (0) |
| 2021 | Luverdense | 12 | (0) |
| 2021– | Camboriú | 6 | (1) |
- Vitória Futebol Clube (ES)
- * Club domestic league appearances and goals

Jucimar Lima Pacheco (born 22 January 1989), commonly known as Abuda, is a Brazilian professional footballer who plays as a defensive midfielder for Vitória Futebol Clube (ES).

Abuda made 43 competitive appearances for Vasco da Gama.
