= André Ribeiro (footballer, born 1988) =

Brazilian footballer

Personal information
- Full name: André Ribeiro dos Santos
- Date of birth: 25 February 1988 (age 38)
- Place of birth: Porto Alegre, Brazil
- Height: 1.86 m (6 ft 1 in)
- Position: Centre back

Team information
- Current team: Americano

Youth career
- 2007: Internacional
- 2008: Grêmio

Senior career*
Years	Team	Apps	(Gls)
2008–2011	Porto Alegre	25	(2)
2012	Brasil de Pelotas	3	(0)
2012	Novo Hamburgo		
2013	Vasco da Gama	5	(1)
2014	Grêmio Barueri	5	(0)
2015	Cruzeiro–RS	15	(1)
2015	Caxias	7	(0)
2016	Cruzeiro–RS	12	(0)
2016	Sergipe	4	(1)
2017	Itumbiara	19	(0)
2018	Parauapebas		
2018	Luverdense	14	(1)
2019	Persipura Jayapura	32	(4)
2020	Macaé	3	(1)
2021–	Americano	0	(0)
- * Club domestic league appearances and goals as of 19:47, 13 May 2021 (UTC)

André Ribeiro dos Santos (born 25 February 1988), simply known as André Ribeiro, is a Brazilian footballer who plays for Americano FC as a defender.

== Honours ==
=== Individual ===
- Indonesian Soccer Awards:Best 11 2019

== Career statistics ==
As of 5 August 2018

Club	Season	League			State League		Cup		Continental		Other		Total	
Club	Season	Division	Apps	Goals	Apps	Goals	Apps	Goals	Apps	Goals	Apps	Goals	Apps	Goals
Porto Alegre	2010	Gaúcho	—		14	1	—		—		—		14	1
Porto Alegre	2011	Gaúcho	—		11	1	—		—		—		11	1
Porto Alegre	Subtotal		—		25	2	—		—		—		25	2
Brasil de Pelotas	2012	Série D	3	0	—		—		—		—		3	0
Novo Hamburgo	2012	Gaúcho	—		—		—		—		11 (Note: All appearance(s) in Copa FGF)	1	11	1
Vasco da Gama	2013	Série A	—		5	1	—		—		—		5	1
Grêmio Barueri	2014	Paulista A2	—		5	0	4	0	—		—		9	0
Cruzeiro–RS	2015	Gaúcho	—		15	1	—		—		—		15	1
Caxias	2015	Série C	7	0	—		—		—		—		7	0
Cruzeiro–RS	2016	Gaúcho	—		12	0	—		—		—		12	0
Sergipe	2016	Série D	4	1	—		—		—		—		4	1
Itumbiara	2017	Série D	6	0	13	0	—		—		—		19	0
Parauapebas	2018	Paraense	—		6	0	—		—		—		6	0
Luverdense	2018	Série C	13	1	—		2	0	—		—		15	1
Career total			33	2	81	4	6	0	0	0	11	1	131	7
