= 2015 Campeonato Paulista knockout stage =

The knockout stage of the 2015 Campeonato Paulista will begin on 11 April with the quarter-final and will be concluded on 3 May 2015 with the final. A total of eight teams compete in the knockout stage.

== Round and draw dates ==
All draws held at Federação Paulista de Futebol headquarters in São Paulo, Brazil.

Round	Draw date	First leg	Second leg
Quarter-finals	9 April 2015	11–12 April 2015	–
Semi-finals	13 April 2015	19 April 2015	–
Finals	20 April 2015	26 April 2015	3 May 2015

== Format ==
With the exception of the final, which is played over two legs, each tie is played over a single leg, with the team with the best placing in the general table playing at home. The quarterfinals are played between the winners and runners-up of each group. In the semifinals the best team (first) will face the team with the worst campaign (fourth), while the second will face the team with the third best campaign.

== Qualified teams ==
Group	Winners	Runners-up
A	São Paulo	Red Bull Brasil
B	Corinthians	Ponte Preta
C	Palmeiras	Botafogo–SP
D	Santos	XV de Piracicaba

=== Bracket ===
Quarterfinals
D1	Santos	3
D2	XV de Piracicaba	0
A1	São Paulo	3
A2	Red Bull Brasil	0
B1	Corinthians	1
B2	Ponte Preta	0
C1	Palmeiras	1
C2	Botafogo	0

Semifinals
D1	Santos	2
A1	São Paulo	1
B1	Corinthians	2 (5)
C1	Palmeiras (p)	2 (6)

Finals
D1	Santos (p)	0	2	2 (4)
C1	Palmeiras	1	1	2 (2)

== Quarterfinals ==
Team 1	Score	Team 2
Corinthians	1–0	Ponte Preta
São Paulo	3–0	Red Bull Brasil
Palmeiras	1–0	Botafogo
Santos	3–0	XV de Piracicaba

11 April 2015
16:20 (UTC−03)

Corinthians	1 – 0	Ponte Preta
Renato Augusto 56'	Report

Arena Corinthians, São Paulo
Attendance: 32,438
Referee: Flavio Rodrigues de Souza

11 April 2015
18:30 (UTC−03)

São Paulo	3 – 0	Red Bull Brasil
Rogério Ceni 44'; Alexandre Pato 51'; Paulo Henrique Ganso 63'	Report

Morumbi, São Paulo
Attendance: 18,221
Referee: Marcelo Aparecido Ribeiro de Souza

12 April 2015
11:00 (UTC−03)

Palmeiras	1 – 0	Botafogo
Leandro Pereira 72'	Report

Allianz Parque, São Paulo
Attendance: 35,437
Referee: Marcelo Rogério

12 April 2015
16:00 (UTC−03)

Santos	3 – 0	XV de Piracicaba
Robinho 18'; Ricardo Oliveira 81'; Lucas Lima 90'	Report

Vila Belmiro, Santos
Attendance: 11,260
Referee: Guilherme Ceretta de Lima

== Semifinals ==
Team 1	Score	Team 2
Corinthians	2–2 (5–6 p)	Palmeiras
Santos	2–1	São Paulo

April 19
16:00 (UTC−03)

Corinthians	2 – 2	Palmeiras
Danilo 34'; Mendoza 44'	Report	14' Victor Ramos; 74' Rafael Marques
Penalties
Fábio Santos (penalty scored); Renato Augusto (penalty scored); Fagner (penalty scored); Ralf (penalty scored); Elias (penalty missed); Gil (penalty scored); Petros (penalty missed)	5 – 6	(penalty missed) Robinho; (penalty scored) Rafael Marques; (penalty scored) Victor Ramos; (penalty scored) Cleiton Xavier; (penalty scored) Dudu; (penalty scored) Kelvin; (penalty scored) Jackson

Arena Corinthians, São Paulo
Attendance: 38,457
Referee: Thiago Duarte Peixoto

April 19
18:30 (UTC−03)

Santos	2 – 1	São Paulo
Geuvânio 36'; Ricardo Oliveira 76'	Report	87' Luís Fabiano

Vila Belmiro, Santos
Attendance: 13,459
Referee: Raphael Claus

== Finals ==
Team 1	Agg.	Team 2	1st leg	2nd leg
Santos	2–2 (4–2 p)	Palmeiras	0–1	2–1

April 26
16:00 (UTC−03)

Palmeiras	1 – 0	Santos
Leandro Pereira 30'	Report

Allianz Parque, São Paulo
Attendance: 39,479
Referee: Vinicius Furlan

Palmeiras	Santos

GK	1	(Brazil) Fernando Prass
RB	32	(Brazil) Lucas
CB	3	(Brazil) Victor Ramos	(yellow card) 89'
CB	31	(Brazil) Vitor Hugo	(yellow card) 42'
LB	11	(Brazil) Zé Roberto (c)
DM	5	(Brazil) Arouca		(substituted off) 17'
DM	18	(Brazil) Gabriel	(yellow card) 62'
RW	19	(Brazil) Rafael Marques
AM	27	(Brazil) Robinho		(substituted off) 81'
LW	7	(Brazil) Dudu
CF	17	(Brazil) Leandro Pereira		(substituted off) 68'
Substitutes:
GK	49	(Brazil) Jailson
DF	26	(Brazil) Jackson
DF	16	(Brazil) Victor Luis
MF	8	(Brazil) Cleiton Xavier	(yellow card) 20'	(substituted on) 17'
MF	29	(Brazil) Kelvin		(substituted on) 81'
FW	33	(Brazil) Gabriel Jesus		(substituted on) 68'
FW	39	(Brazil) Ryder Matos
Manager:
(Brazil) Oswaldo de Oliveira

GK	12	(Brazil) Vladimir
RB	4	(Brazil) Cicinho
CB	14	(Brazil) David Braz
CB	32	(Brazil) Paulo Ricardo	(red card) 58'
LB	13	(Brazil) Victor Ferraz		(substituted off) 60'
DM	25	(Brazil) Lucas Otávio
DM	8	(Brazil) Renato (c)
AM	20	(Brazil) Lucas Lima	(yellow card) 76'
RW	11	(Brazil) Geuvânio		(substituted off) 79'
LW	23	(Brazil) Chiquinho
CF	9	(Brazil) Ricardo Oliveira		(substituted off) 87'
Substitutes:
GK	33	(Brazil) Gabriel Gasparotto
DF	3	(Brazil) Caju
DF	36	(Brazil) Jubal		(substituted on) 60'
MF	21	(Brazil) Leandrinho		(substituted on) 87'
MF	22	(Brazil) Elano
MF	29	(Brazil) Thiago Maia
FW	10	(Brazil) Gabriel		(substituted on) 79'
Manager:
(Brazil) Marcelo Fernandes

May 3
16:00 (UTC−03)

Santos	2 – 1	Palmeiras
David Braz 30'; Ricardo Oliveira 44'	Report	65' Lucas
Penalties
David Braz (penalty scored); Gustavo Henrique (penalty scored); Victor Ferraz (penalty scored); Lucas Lima (penalty scored)	4 – 2	(penalty scored) Cleiton Xavier; (penalty missed) Rafael Marques; (penalty missed) Jackson; (penalty scored) Leandro Pereira

Vila Belmiro, Santos
Attendance: 14,662
Referee: Guilherme Ceretta de Lima

Santos	Palmeiras

GK	12	(Brazil) Vladimir
RB	13	(Brazil) Victor Ferraz
CB	14	(Brazil) David Braz	(yellow card) 87'
CB	2	(Brazil) Werley		(substituted off) 53'
LB	23	(Brazil) Chiquinho
DM	15	(Colombia) Edwin Valencia	(yellow card) 16'	(substituted off) 84'
DM	8	(Brazil) Renato
AM	20	(Brazil) Lucas Lima
RW	11	(Brazil) Geuvânio	(red card) 45+1'
LW	7	(Brazil) Robinho (c)		(substituted off) 87'
CF	9	(Brazil) Ricardo Oliveira
Substitutes:
GK	33	(Brazil) Gabriel Gasparotto
DF	4	(Brazil) Cicinho		(substituted on) 87'
DF	6	(Brazil) Gustavo Henrique		(substituted on) 53'
MF	21	(Brazil) Leandrinho		(substituted on) 84'
MF	22	(Brazil) Elano
FW	10	(Brazil) Gabriel
FW	49	(Brazil) Lucas Crispim
Manager:
(Brazil) Marcelo Fernandes

GK	1	(Brazil) Fernando Prass
RB	32	(Brazil) Lucas	(yellow card) 90+2'
CB	3	(Brazil) Victor Ramos	(yellow card) 61'	(red card) 78'
CB	31	(Brazil) Vitor Hugo
LB	11	(Brazil) Zé Roberto (c)
DM	18	(Brazil) Gabriel	(yellow card) 25'	(substituted off) 74'
CM	27	(Brazil) Robinho		(substituted off) 53'
RW	19	(Brazil) Rafael Marques
AM	10	(Chile) Jorge Valdivia	(yellow card) 9'	(substituted off) 81'
LW	7	(Brazil) Dudu	(red card) 45+1'
CF	17	(Brazil) Leandro Pereira
Substitutes:
GK	49	(Brazil) Jailson
DF	26	(Brazil) Jackson		(substituted on) 81'
MF	8	(Brazil) Cleiton Xavier		(substituted on) 53'
MF	15	(Brazil) Amaral		(substituted on) 74'
MF	29	(Brazil) Kelvin
FW	9	(Argentina) Jonathan Cristaldo
FW	33	(Brazil) Gabriel Jesus
Manager:
(Brazil) Oswaldo de Oliveira
