= 2015 SE Palmeiras season =

Palmeiras
2015 season
- President: Paulo Nobre
- Coach: Oswaldo de Oliveira (Until June 9); Marcelo Oliveira (June 15–March 9)
- Stadium: Allianz Parque
- Série A: 9th
- Campeonato Paulista: Runner-up
- Copa do Brasil: Winners
- Top goalscorer: League: Dudu (10 goals); All: Dudu (16 goals)
- Highest home attendance: 39,660 (vs. Santos – December 2)
- Lowest home attendance: 15,037 (vs. Coritiba – November 29)
- Average home league attendance: 29,454
Home colors	Away colors	Third colors

The 2015 season was the 101st in SE Palmeiras existence. This season Palmeiras participated in the Campeonato Paulista, Copa do Brasil and the Série A.

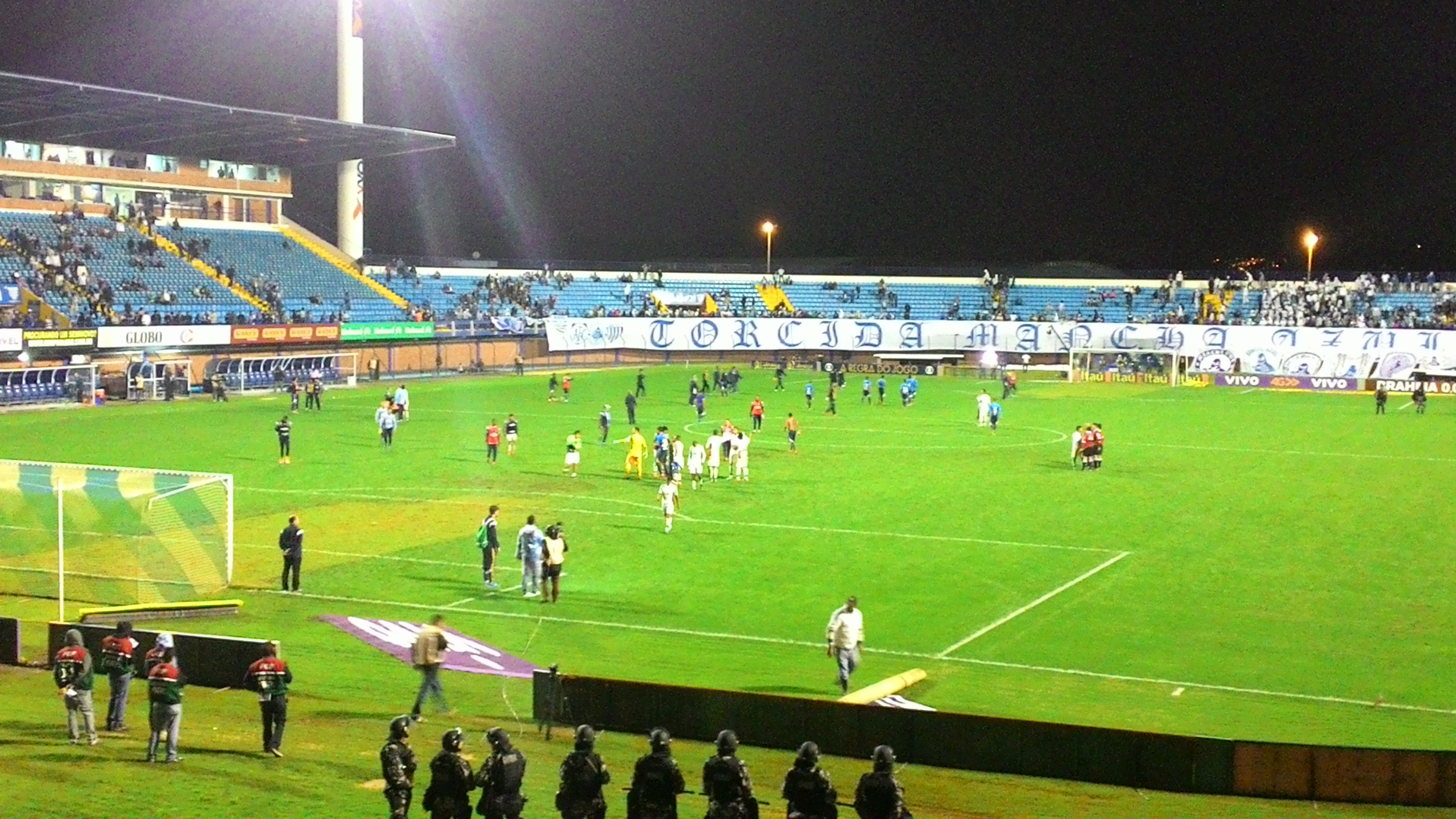
Avaí v Palmeiras on October 17, 2015, at the Estádio da Ressacada in Florianópolis.

== Players ==
=== Squad information ===
As of August 28, 2015.

Note: Flags indicate national team as defined under FIFA eligibility rules; some limited exceptions apply. Players may hold more than one non-FIFA nationality.

No.	Pos.	Nation	Player
1	GK	BRA	Fernando Prass
3	DF	BRA	Victor Ramos (on loan from Monterrey)
4	DF	BRA	Nathan
5	MF	BRA	Arouca
6	DF	BRA	João Paulo (on loan from Desportivo Brasil)
7	FW	BRA	Dudu
8	FW	PAR	Lucas Barrios
9	FW	ARG	Jonathan Cristaldo
10	MF	BRA	Cleiton Xavier
11	MF	BRA	Zé Roberto
14	FW	ARG	Pablo Mouche
15	MF	BRA	Amaral
18	MF	BRA	Gabriel (on loan from Botafogo)
19	FW	BRA	Rafael Marques (on loan from Henan Jianye)
20	MF	ARG	Agustín Allione
22	DF	BRA	João Pedro
25	GK	BRA	Aranha
26	DF	BRA	Jackson

No.	Pos.	Nation	Player
27	MF	BRA	Robinho
28	MF	BRA	Andrei Girotto (on loan from América Mineiro)
29	FW	BRA	Kelvin (on loan from Porto)
30	MF	BRA	Fellype Gabriel
31	DF	BRA	Vitor Hugo (on loan from América Mineiro)
32	DF	BRA	Lucas (captain)
33	FW	BRA	Gabriel Jesus
35	MF	BRA	Thiago Santos
36	MF	BRA	Matheus Sales
42	DF	BRA	Lucas Taylor
44	DF	BRA	Leandro Almeida
47	GK	BRA	Fábio
48	GK	BRA	Vinícius
49	GK	BRA	Jailson
66	DF	BRA	Egídio
90	FW	BRA	Alecsandro
—	MF	BRA	Julen
—	FW	BRA	Luan

=== Transfers ===
==== Transfers in ====
P	Nat.	Name	Age	Moving from	Type	Source
MF	(Brazil)	Amaral	28	(Brazil) Goiás	Sign	
C	(Brazil)	Oswaldo de Oliveira	64	—	Sign	
DF	(Brazil)	Vitor Hugo	23	(Brazil) América Mineiro	Loan	
DF	(Brazil)	Lucas	26	(Brazil) Botafogo	Sign	
FW	(Brazil)	Maikon Leite	26	(Mexico) Atlas	Loan return	
MF	(Brazil)	Andrei Girotto	22	(Brazil) América Mineiro	Loan	
FW	(Brazil)	Leandro Pereira	23	(Brazil) Chapecoense	Sign	
DF	(Brazil)	Gabriel	22	(Brazil) Botafogo	Loan	
DF	(Brazil)	Zé Roberto	40	(Brazil) Grêmio	Sign	
DF	(Brazil)	João Paulo	28	(Brazil) Desportivo Brasil	Loan	
DF	(Brazil)	Ayrton	29	(Brazil) Vitória	Loan return	
MF	(Brazil)	Luiz Gustavo	20	(Brazil) Vitória	Loan return	
MF	(Brazil)	João Denoni	20	(Brazil) Oeste	Loan return	
MF	(Brazil)	Tiago Real	25	(Brazil) Goiás	Loan return	
FW	(Brazil)	Vinícius	21	(Brazil) Vitória	Loan return	
FW	(Brazil)	Dudu	23	(Brazil) Grêmio	Sign	
FW	(Brazil)	Robinho	27	(Brazil) Coritiba	Sign	
FW	(Brazil)	Rafael Marques	31	(China) Henan Jianye	Loan	
DF	(Brazil)	Victor Ramos	25	(Mexico) Monterrey	Loan	
FW	(Brazil)	Kelvin	21	(Portugal) Porto	Loan	
DF	(Brazil)	Jackson	24	(Brazil) Internacional	Loan	
MF	(Brazil)	Alan Patrick	23	(Brazil) Internacional	Loan	
MF	(Brazil)	Ryder	21	(Italy) Fiorentina	Loan	
MF	(Brazil)	Arouca	28	(Brazil) Santos	Sign	
GK	(Brazil)	Aranha	34	(Brazil) Santos	Sign	
MF	(Brazil)	Cleiton Xavier	31	(Ukraine) Metalist Kharkiv	Sign	
DF	(Brazil)	Egídio	28	(Ukraine) Dnipro	Sign	
MF	(Brazil)	Fellype Gabriel	29	(United Arab Emirates) Al-Sharjah	Sign	
FW	(Brazil)	Alecsandro	34	(Brazil) Flamengo	Sign	
FW	(Paraguay)	Lucas Barrios	30	(France) Montpellier	Sign	
DF	(Brazil)	Leandro Almeida	28	(Brazil) Coritiba	Sign	
DF	(Brazil)	Lucas Taylor	20	Reserve Team	Sign	
MF	(Brazil)	Thiago Santos	25	(Brazil) América Mineiro	Sign	

==== Transfers out ====
P	Nat.	Name	Age	Moving to	Type	Source
C	(Brazil)	Dorival Júnior	52	—	Fired	
GK	(Brazil)	Bruno	30	(Brazil) Santa Cruz	Loan	
GK	(Brazil)	Deola	31	(Brazil) Fortaleza	Loan	
DF	(Brazil)	Gabriel Dias	20	(Brazil) Boa Esporte	Loan	
DF	(Brazil)	Juninho	25	(Brazil) Figueirense	Sign	
DF	(Brazil)	Léo Cunha	19	Reserve Team	Released	
DF	(Brazil)	Lúcio	36	—	Released	
DF	(Uruguay)	Victorino	32	—	Released	
DF	(Brazil)	Weldinho	24	—	Released	
MF	(Brazil)	Bernardo	24	(Brazil) Vasco	Loan return	
MF	(Brazil)	Bruninho	22	—	Released	
MF	(Uruguay)	Eguren	34	—	Released	
MF	(Brazil)	Felipe Menezes	26	(Brazil) Goiás	Loan	
MF	(Brazil)	João Denoni	21	(Brazil) Atlético Goianiense	Loan	
MF	(Brazil)	Juninho	19	Reserve Team	Released	
MF	(Brazil)	Marcelo Oliveira	27	(Brazil) Grêmio	Loan ended	
MF	(Brazil)	Tiago Real	25	—	Released	
MF	(Brazil)	Washington	26	—	Released	
MF	(Brazil)	Wendel	33	—	Released	
MF	(Brazil)	Wesley	27	(Brazil) São Paulo	Released	
FW	(Brazil)	Bruno César	26	(Saudi Arabia) Al-Ahli	Loan return	
FW	(Brazil)	Diogo	27	(Thailand) Buriram United	Sign	
FW	(Brazil)	Érik	20	Reserve Team	Released	
FW	(Brazil)	Henrique	25	—	Loan ended	
FW	(Brazil)	Mazinho	27	(Brazil) Coritiba	Loan	
FW	(Brazil)	Patrick Vieira	23	(Brazil) Náutico	Loan	
FW	(Brazil)	Rodolfo	21	(Brazil) Rio Claro	Loan	
FW	(Brazil)	Vinícius	21	—	Released	
MF	(Brazil)	Luiz Gustavo	21	(Brazil) Vitória	Loan	
MF	(Paraguay)	Mendieta	26	(Paraguay) Olimpia	Loan	
DF	(Brazil)	Mateus Muller	19	(Brazil) Atlético Goianiense	Loan	
MF	(Brazil)	Renato	23	(Brazil) Joinville	Loan	
FW	(Brazil)	Maikon Leite	26	(Brazil) Sport	Loan	
C	(Brazil)	Oswaldo de Oliveira	64	—	Fired	
DF	(Brazil)	Victor Luis	21	(Brazil) Ceará	Loan	
DF	(Brazil)	Ayrton	30	(Brazil) Flamengo	Loan	
MF	(Brazil)	Alan Patrick	24	(Brazil) Flamengo	Loan	
DF	(Brazil)	Wellington	23	(Brazil) Atlético Paranaense	Loan	
DF	(Argentina)	Tobio	25	(Argentina) Boca Juniors	Loan	
MF	(Brazil)	Ryder	22	(Italy) Fiorentina	Loan	
MF	(Chile)	Valdivia	31	(United Arab Emirates) Al-Wahda	Sign	
FW	(Brazil)	Leandro	22	(Brazil) Santos	Loan	
FW	(Brazil)	Leandro Pereira	24	(Belgium) Club Brugge	Sign	

== Competitions ==
=== Overview ===
Competition	First match	Last match	Starting round	Final position	Record							
Competition	First match	Last match	Starting round	Final position	Pld	W	D	L	GF	GA	GD	Win %
Série A	9 May 2015	6 December 2015	Matchday 1	9th	38	15	8	15	60	51	+9	39.47
Copa do Brasil	4 March 2015	2 December 2015	First Round	Winners	13	8	3	2	25	14	+11	61.54
Campeonato Paulista	31 January 2015	3 May 2015	Matchday 1	Runners-up	19	12	2	5	28	14	+14	63.16
Total					70	35	13	22	113	79	+34	50.00

Source: Competitions

=== Friendlies ===
January 17	Palmeiras (Brazil)	3–1	(China) Shandong Luneng	São Paulo
17:00 (UTC–2)	Leandro Pereira 17'; Lucas 39'; Cristaldo 75'; Girotto (yellow card) 80'	Report	Montillo 14'; Aloísio (yellow card) 51'	Stadium: Allianz Parque; Attendance: 27,013; Referee: Luiz Flávio de Oliveira (Brazil)

January 25	Palmeiras	3–2	Red Bull Brasil	São Paulo
19:00 (UTC–2)	Allione 37'; Cristaldo 54'; Alan Patrick 75'; Jackson (yellow card) 90'	Report	Lulinha 56'; Andrade (yellow card) 61'; Anderson Marques 88'	Stadium: Allianz Parque; Attendance: 20,151; Referee: Regildênia Moura (São Paulo)

=== Campeonato Paulista ===
==== Standings ====
Pos	Team	Pld	W	D	L	GF	GA	GD	Pts	Qualification
1	Palmeiras (A)	15	10	1	4	23	10	+13	31	Advance to the quarter-finals
2	Botafogo (A)	15	6	4	5	16	14	+2	22	Advance to the quarter-finals
3	Linense	15	4	4	7	12	25	−13	16	
4	Portuguesa	15	2	7	6	13	22	−9	13	
5	Marília	15	0	2	13	6	35	−29	2	

(A) Advance to a further round

==== First stage ====
In the first stage, the teams play in a group with all of the clubs of other groups in a single round, qualifying for the quarterfinal the 2 teams with the most points won this stage in each of the groups. Schedule was released on December 1, 2014.

Win Draw Loss

January 31 1	Palmeiras	3–1	Audax	São Paulo
17:00 (UTC–2)	Leandro Pereira 6'; Robinho 13'; Maikon Leite 35'	Report	Matheus (yellow card) 76'; Rafinha 90+3'	Stadium: Allianz Parque; Attendance: 24,894; Referee: Thiago Duarte Peixoto

February 5 2	Palmeiras	0–1	Ponte Preta	São Paulo
19:30 (UTC–2)	Tobio (yellow card) 27'; Dudu (yellow card) 76'	Report	Bruno Silva (yellow card) 41'; Wanderson 60'; Rodrigo Biro (yellow card) 74'; Roni (yellow card) 85'	Stadium: Allianz Parque; Attendance: 24,695; Referee: Marcio Henrique de Gois

February 8 3	Palmeiras	0–1	Corinthians	São Paulo
17:00 (UTC–2)	Robinho (yellow card) 29'; Alan Patrick (yellow card) 62'; Fernando Prass (yellow card) 79'	Report	Bruno Henrique (yellow card) 25'; Danilo 32'; Cássio (yellow card) 52' (yellow-red card) 56'	Stadium: Allianz Parque; Attendance: 28,869; Referee: Raphael Claus

February 11 4	Palmeiras	3–0	Rio Claro	São Paulo
20:30 (UTC–2)	Cristaldo 34'; Jailson (yellow card) 45+1'; Zé Roberto 63'; Rafael Marques 82'	Report	Guaru (yellow card) 42'	Stadium: Allianz Parque; Attendance: 17,528; Referee: Vinicius Gonçalves Dias Araújo

February 14 5	São Bento	0–1	Palmeiras	Sorocaba
19:30 (UTC–2)	Alex Reinaldo (yellow card) 34'; Renan Teixeira (yellow card) 63'	Report	Vitor Hugo (yellow card) 61'; Dudu 69'	Stadium: Walter Ribeiro; Attendance: 7,809; Referee: José Claudio Rocha Filho

February 22 6	Penapolense	0–2	Palmeiras	Penápolis
18:30 (UTC–3)	Jaílton (yellow card) 81'	Report	Cristaldo 45', 74'; Allione (yellow card) 55'; Vitor Hugo (yellow card) 65'; Leandro Pereira (yellow card) 86'; Robinho (yellow card) 90+2'	Stadium: Tenente Carriço; Attendance: 10,066; Referee: Leandro Bizzio Marinho

February 28 7	Palmeiras	2–0	Capivariano	São Paulo
18:30 (UTC–3)	Robinho 80', 88', (yellow card) 90'; Vitor Hugo (yellow card) 90+4'	Report	Júlio César (yellow card) 36'; Franci (yellow card) 53'; Oliveira (yellow card) 60'; Hélio (yellow card) 79'	Stadium: Allianz Parque; Attendance: 32,134; Referee: Norberto Luciano Santos da Silveira

March 7 8	Palmeiras	1–0	Bragantino	São Paulo
18:30 (UTC–3)	Rafael Marques 32'; Victor Luis (yellow card) 86'	Report	Thiago Martinelli (yellow card) 90+1'	Stadium: Allianz Parque; Attendance: 29,452; Referee: Luiz Flávio de Oliveira

March 11 9	Santos	2–1	Palmeiras	Santos
22:00 (UTC–3)	Geuvânio (yellow card) 22'; Renato 27'; Ricardo Oliveira (yellow card) 31', (goal) 61'; Valencia (yellow card) 82'; Lucas Lima (yellow card) 84'; David Braz (yellow card) 90+2'	Report	Vitor Hugo 7'; Arouca (yellow card) 30'; Dudu (yellow card) 72'	Stadium: Vila Belmiro; Attendance: 11,416; Referee: Thiago Duarte Peixoto

March 15 10	Palmeiras	1–0	XV de Piracicaba	São Paulo
11:00 (UTC–3)	Vitor Hugo (yellow card) 24'; Arouca (yellow card) 66'; Zé Roberto (yellow card) 74'; Gabriel 84'	Report	Diego Silva (yellow card) 41'; Clayton (yellow card) 54'; Ednei (yellow card) 57'; Tony (yellow card) 59' (yellow-red card) 65'	Stadium: Allianz Parque; Attendance: 26,199; Referee: Rodrigo Guarizo Ferreira do Amaral

March 22 11	São Bernardo	0–1	Palmeiras	São Bernardo do Campo
19:30 (UTC–3)	Cañete (yellow card) 28'; Luciano Castán (yellow card) 37'	Report	Cristaldo (yellow card) 37'; Vitor Hugo 54'; Rafael Marques (yellow card) 79'; Fernando Prass (yellow card) 86'	Stadium: Primeiro de Maio; Attendance: 11,560; Referee: Douglas Marques das Flores

March 25 12	Palmeiras	3–0	São Paulo	São Paulo
22:00 (UTC–3)	Robinho 2'; Rafael Marques 23', 51'; Zé Roberto (yellow card) 26'; Vitor Hugo (yellow card) 43'	Report	Toloi (red card) 7'; Ganso (yellow card) 34'; Michel Bastos (red card) 78'	Stadium: Allianz Parque; Attendance: 25,804; Referee: Vinicius Furlan

March 29 13	Red Bull Brasil	2–0	Palmeiras	Campinas
18:30 (UTC–3)	Lulinha 19'; Samuel (yellow card) 29'; Fabiano Eller 33'; Gustavo Scarpa (yellow card) 65'; Carlinhos (yellow card) 75'; Juninho (yellow card) 77'	Report	Tobio (yellow card) 90+1'	Stadium: Moisés Lucarelli; Attendance: 7,355; Referee: Leonardo Ferreira Lima

April 4 14	Palmeiras	3–1	Mogi Mirim	São Paulo
18:30 (UTC–3)	Dudu 11', 14', (yellow card) 53'; Vitor Hugo (yellow card) 27' (yellow-red card) 68'; Robinho 37'; Fernando Prass (yellow card) 82'; Arouca (yellow card) 83'	Report	Geovane 59'; Wagner Silva (yellow card) 88'	Stadium: Allianz Parque; Attendance: 29,536; Referee: Luiz Vanderlei Martinucho

April 8 15	Ituano	2–2	Palmeiras	Itu
22:00 (UTC–3)	Ewerton Cabeça (yellow card) 37'; Dick (yellow card) 48'; Claudinho (yellow card) 49'; Clayson 60', (yellow card) 69'; Ricardinho 70'; Naylhor (yellow card) 84'	Report	Jackson (yellow card) 43'; Renato (yellow card) 43'; Rafael Marques 51'; Victor Luis (yellow card) 62'; Leandro Pereira (yellow card) 73'; João Pedro 83'	Stadium: Novelli Júnior; Attendance: 5,545; Referee: Antonio Rogério Batista do Prado

==== Quarterfinal ====
April 12	Palmeiras	1–0	Botafogo-SP	São Paulo
11:00 (UTC–3)	Gabriel (yellow card) 54'; Vitor Hugo (yellow card) 71'; Leandro Pereira 71', (yellow card) 74'; Victor Luis (yellow card) 85'	Report	Rodrigo (yellow card) 9'; Gimenez (yellow card) 60'; André Rocha (yellow card) 74'; Liel (yellow card) 75'; Denis (yellow card) 29'	Stadium: Allianz Parque; Attendance: 35,437; Referee: Marcelo Rogério

==== Semifinal ====
April 19	Corinthians	2–2 (5–6 p)	Palmeiras	São Paulo
16:00 (UTC–3)	Danilo 33'; Fagner (yellow card) 38'; Mendoza 44'; Felipe (yellow card) 67'	Report	Victor Ramos 13'; Lucas (yellow card) 17'; Arouca (yellow card) 72'; Rafael Marques 74'	Stadium: Arena Corinthians; Attendance: 38,457; Referee: Thiago Duarte Peixoto
	Penalties
	Fábio Santos (penalty scored); Renato Augusto (penalty scored); Fagner (penalty scored); Ralf (penalty scored); Elias (penalty missed); Gil (penalty scored); Petros (penalty missed)		(penalty missed) Robinho; (penalty scored) Rafael Marques; (penalty scored) Victor Ramos; (penalty scored) Cleiton Xavier; (penalty scored) Dudu; (penalty scored) Kelvin; (penalty scored) Jackson

==== Final ====
April 26 First leg	Palmeiras	1–0	Santos	São Paulo
16:00 (UTC−3)	Cleiton Xavier (yellow card) 19'; Leandro Pereira 29'; Vitor Hugo (yellow card) 41'; Gabriel (yellow card) 61'; Victor Ramos (yellow card) 89'	Report	Paulo Ricardo (red card) 56'; Lucas Lima (yellow card) 75'	Stadium: Allianz Parque; Attendance: 39,479; Referee: Vinicius Furlan

May 3 Second leg	Santos	2–1 (2–2 agg.) (4–2 p)	Palmeiras	Santos
16:00 (UTC−3)	Valencia (yellow card) 16'; David Braz 29', (yellow card) 86'; Ricardo Oliveira 43'; Geuvânio (red card) 45'	Report	Dudu (yellow card) 3' (red card) 45'; Valdivia (yellow card) 8'; Gabriel (yellow card) 24'; Victor Ramos (yellow card) 59' (red card) 77'; Lucas 64', (yellow card) 90+1'	Stadium: Vila Belmiro; Attendance: 14,662; Referee: Guilherme Ceretta de Lima
	Penalties
	David Braz (penalty scored); Gustavo Henrique (penalty scored); Victor Ferraz (penalty scored); Lucas Lima (penalty scored)		(penalty scored) Cleiton Xavier; (penalty missed) Rafael Marques; (penalty missed) Jackson; (penalty scored) Leandro Pereira

=== Copa do Brasil ===
==== First round ====
The draw for the first round was held on December 16, 2014.

March 4 First leg	Vitória da Conquista (Bahia)	1–4	(São Paulo (state)) Palmeiras	Vitória da Conquista
22:00 (UTC+3)	Tatu 63'	Report	Cristaldo 13' (pen.); Robinho (yellow card) 31', (goal) 78'; Gabriel (yellow card) 60'; Allione 64'; Arouca (red card) 73'; Dudu 83'	Stadium: Lomanto Júnior; Attendance: 9,682; Referee: Charles Hebert Cavalcante Ferreira (Alagoas)
Note: Palmeiras won the match by two goals and eliminated the second leg.

==== Second round ====
April 29 First leg	Sampaio Corrêa (Maranhão)	1–1	(São Paulo (state)) Palmeiras	São Luís
22:00 (UTC−3)	Robert (yellow card) 44'; Cleitinho 86'	Report	Jackson (yellow card) 47'; Cristaldo 68', (yellow card) 81'; Tobio (yellow card) 82'	Stadium: Castelão; Attendance: 17,772; Referee: Antonio Dib Moraes de Sousa (Piauí)

May 12 Second leg	Palmeiras (São Paulo (state))	5–1 (6–2 agg.)	(Maranhão) Sampaio Corrêa	São Paulo
21:50 (UTC−3)	Dudu (yellow card) 45+'; Fernando Prass (yellow card) 45+'; Vitor Hugo 49'; Cristaldo 55'; Zé Roberto 66', 90+2'; Kelvin 79'	Report	Diones 23'; Válber (yellow card) 38'; Gil Mineiro (yellow card) 78'	Stadium: Allianz Parque; Attendance: 24,443; Referee: Fábio Filipus (Paraná)
Note: Dudu and Fernando Prass received the yellow card at the halftime.

==== Third round ====
May 27 First leg	Palmeiras (São Paulo (state))	0–0	(Alagoas) ASA de Arapiraca	São Paulo
22:00 (UTC−3)	Jackson (yellow card) 22'; Kelvin (yellow card) 49'; Vitor Hugo (yellow card) 75'; Leandro Pereira (yellow card) 86'	Report	Fábio Alves (yellow card) 27'; Chiquinho Alagoano (yellow card) 76'	Stadium: Allianz Parque; Attendance: 17,212; Referee: Rodolpho Toski Marques (Paraná)

July 15 Second leg	ASA de Arapiraca (Alagoas)	0–1 (0–1 agg.)	(São Paulo (state)) Palmeiras	Londrina
22:00 (UTC−3)	Fábio Alves (yellow card) 31'; Jorginho (yellow card) 76'; Max Carrasco (yellow card) 80'	Report	Gabriel Jesus 69'	Stadium: Estádio do Café; Attendance: 17,488; Referee: Paulo Roberto Alves Junior (Paraná)

==== Round of 16 ====
A draw by CBF was held on August 4 to set the matches of the round of 16.

August 19 First leg	Palmeiras (São Paulo (state))	2–1	(Minas Gerais) Cruzeiro	São Paulo
22:00 (UTC−3)	Cleiton Xavier 7'; Zé Roberto (yellow card) 46'; Rafael Marques 62'	Report	Leandro Damião 49'; Fabrício (yellow card) 57'	Stadium: Allianz Parque; Attendance: 24,889; Referee: Marcelo de Lima Henrique (Pernambuco)

August 26 Second leg	Cruzeiro (Minas Gerais)	2–3 (3–5 agg.)	(São Paulo (state)) Palmeiras	Belo Horizonte
22:00 (UTC−3)	Bruno Rodrigo (red card) 24'; Vinícius Araújo 38'; Alisson 75' (pen.)	Report	Barrios 8'; Amaral (yellow card) 17'; Gabriel Jesus 27', 32'; Zé Roberto (yellow card) 56'; João Pedro (yellow card) 74'; Robinho (yellow card) 84'	Stadium: Mineirão; Attendance: 16,972; Referee: Anderson Daronco (Rio Grande do Sul)

==== Quarterfinal ====
For this round another draw was held on August 31.

September 23 First leg	Internacional (Rio Grande do Sul)	1–1	(São Paulo (state)) Palmeiras	Porto Alegre
19:30 (UTC−03)	Alex 53'; Vitinho (yellow card) 68'; Wellington (yellow card) 71'; Silva (yellow card) 90'	Report	Rafael Marques 72'	Stadium: Beira-Rio; Attendance: 34,732; Referee: Sandro Ricci (Santa Catarina)

September 30 Second leg	Palmeiras (São Paulo (state))	3–2 (4–3 agg.)	(Rio Grande do Sul) Internacional	São Paulo
22:00 (UTC−03)	Vitor Hugo 7'; Dudu (yellow card) 24'; Amaral (yellow card) 34'; Zé Roberto 38' (pen.); Lucas (yellow card) 41'; Andrei Girotto 74'	Report	Alex (yellow card) 37'; Anderson 56'; Lisandro López 73'; William (yellow card) 81'; Rodrigo Dourado (yellow card) 89'	Stadium: Allianz Parque; Attendance: 33,391; Referee: Wilton Pereira Sampaio (Goiás)

==== Semifinal ====
The order of the matches was determined by a draw which as held on October 5.

October 21 First leg	Fluminense (Rio de Janeiro (state))	2–1	(São Paulo (state)) Palmeiras	Rio de Janeiro
22:00 (UTC−02)	Wellington Silva (yellow card) 4'; Marcos Júnior 28'; Jean (yellow card) 30'; Gum 41'; Marlon (yellow card) 56'; Cícero (yellow card) 61'; Gerson (yellow card) 87'	Report	Victor Ramos (yellow card) 40'; Zé Roberto 60' (pen.); Lucas (yellow card) 81'	Stadium: Maracanã; Attendance: 34,895; Referee: Leandro Vuaden (Rio Grande do Sul)

October 28 Second leg	Palmeiras (São Paulo (state))	2–1 (3–3 agg.) (4–1 p)	(Rio de Janeiro (state)) Fluminense	São Paulo
22:00 (UTC−02)	Barrios 13', 17'; Jackson (yellow card) 79'	Report	Wellington Silva (yellow card) 16'; Fred 70', (yellow card) 79'	Stadium: Allianz Parque; Attendance: 38,562; Referee: Anderson Daronco (Rio Grande do Sul)
	Penalties
	Rafael Marques (penalty scored); Jackson (penalty scored); Cristaldo (penalty scored); Allione (penalty scored)		(penalty scored) Jean; (penalty missed) Gustavo Scarpa; (penalty missed) Gum

==== Final ====
The order of the matches was determined by a draw.

November 25 First leg	Santos (São Paulo (state))	1–0	(São Paulo (state)) Palmeiras	Santos
22:00 (UTC−2)	Renato (yellow card) 59'; Ricardo Oliveira (yellow card) 63'; Gabriel 78', (yellow card) 79'; Victor Ferraz (yellow card) 83'	Report	Fernando Prass (yellow card) 31'; Matheus Sales (yellow card) 37'; Barrios (yellow card) 42'; Arouca (yellow card) 63'; Lucas (yellow card) 69' (yellow-red card) 87'; Dudu (yellow card) 90'	Stadium: Vila Belmiro; Attendance: 14,116; Referee: Luiz Flávio de Oliveira (São Paulo)

December 2 Second leg	Palmeiras (São Paulo (state))	2–1 (2–2 agg.) (4–3 p)	(São Paulo (state)) Santos	São Paulo
22:00 (UTC−2)	Matheus Sales (yellow card) 50'; Dudu 56', 84', (yellow card) 90'; João Pedro (yellow card) 66'	Report	Gabriel (yellow card) 48'; Ricardo Oliveira 87'	Stadium: Allianz Parque; Attendance: 39,660; Referee: Héber Lopes (Santa Catarina)
	Penalties
	Zé Roberto (penalty scored); Rafael Marques (penalty missed); Jackson (penalty scored); Cristaldo (penalty scored); Fernando Prass (penalty scored)		(penalty missed) Marquinhos Gabriel; (penalty missed) Gustavo Henrique; (penalty scored) Geuvânio; (penalty scored) Lucas Lima; (penalty scored) Ricardo Oliveira

=== Campeonato Brasileiro ===
==== Standings ====
Pos	Team	Pld	W	D	L	GF	GA	GD	Pts	Qualification or relegation
7	Santos	38	16	10	12	59	41	+18	58	2016 Copa Sudamericana second stage (Note: Teams will enter in the 2016 Copa Sudamericana if they do not reach the 2016 Copa do Brasil round of 16. Also, the 2015 Copa Verde champion (Cuiabá) and the 2016 Copa do Nordeste champion have a guaranteed berth.)
8	Cruzeiro	38	15	10	13	44	35	+9	55	2016 Copa Sudamericana second stage
9	Palmeiras	38	15	8	15	60	51	+9	53	2016 Copa Libertadores second stage (Note: Palmeiras has a berth guaranteed to the second stage as the 2015 Copa do Brasil champions.)
10	Atlético Paranaense	38	14	9	15	43	48	−5	51	2016 Copa Sudamericana second stage
11	Ponte Preta	38	13	12	13	41	40	+1	51	2016 Copa Sudamericana second stage

Source: Soccerway.com
Rules for classification: 1) points; 2) wins; 3) goal difference; 4) goals scored; 5) head-to-head results; 6) least red cards received; 7) least yellow cards received; 8) draw.

==== Matches ====
Schedule released on March 3, 2015. And detailed the first ten rounds on March 17, 2015.

May 9 1	Palmeiras	2–2	Atlético Mineiro	São Paulo
18:30 (UTC−3)	Gabriel (yellow card) 21'; Robinho (yellow card) 53'; Vitor Hugo 81'; Rafael Marques 90+4'	Report	Jô (yellow card) 22', (goal) 85'; Patric (yellow card) 29', (goal) 50'; Josué (yellow card) 74'; Pedro Botelho (yellow card) 90+4'	Stadium: Allianz Parque; Attendance: 28,781; Referee: Felipe Gomes da Silva (Paraná)

May 17 2	Joinville	0–0	Palmeiras	Joinville
18:30 (UTC−3)	Bruno Aguiar (yellow card) 15'; Mário Sérgio (yellow card) 37'; Kempes (yellow card) 49'	Report	Leandro Pereira (yellow card) 52'	Stadium: Arena Joinville; Attendance: 0 Referee: Wilton Pereira Sampaio (Goiás)
Note: Match played behind closed doors because of confusion in the duel against Ponte Preta, in 2014 Série B.

May 24 3	Palmeiras	0–1	Goiás	São Paulo
11:00 (UTC−3)	Valdivia (yellow card) 8'; Victor Ramos (yellow card) 16' (red card) 90+4'; Leandro Pereira (yellow card) 33'; Lucas (yellow card) 38'; Kelvin (yellow card) 68'; Leandro (yellow card) 86'	Report	Forster (yellow card) 9'; Wesley (yellow card) 53'; Bruno Henrique (yellow card) 63' (yellow-red card) 77'; Victor Ramos 76' (o.g.); Péricles (yellow card) 81'; William Kozlowski (yellow card) 86'	Stadium: Allianz Parque; Attendance: 37,337; Referee: Marcelo de Lima Henrique (Pernambuco)

May 31 4	Corinthians	0–2	Palmeiras	São Paulo
16:00 (UTC−3)	Ralf (yellow card) 38'; Renato Augusto (yellow card) 47'; Gil (yellow card) 68'; Edílson (yellow card) 72'; Danilo (yellow card) 74'	Report	Arouca (yellow card) 17'; Rafael Marques 24'; Egídio (yellow card) 44'; Zé Roberto 45+1'; Lucas (yellow card) 66'; Valdivia (yellow card) 79'; Kelvin (yellow card) 83'	Stadium: Arena Corinthians; Attendance: 29,479; Referee: Vinicius Gonçalves Dias Araújo (São Paulo)

June 4 5	Palmeiras	1–1	Internacional	São Paulo
21:00 (UTC−3)	Vitor Hugo 64'; Lucas (yellow card) 68'	Report	Alex (yellow card) 1'; Anderson (yellow card) 63'; Artur (yellow card) 74'; Rafael Moura 76'; Alisson (yellow card) 90+2'	Stadium: Allianz Parque; Attendance: 36,199; Referee: Rodolpho Toski Marques (Paraná)

June 7 6	Figueirense	2–1	Palmeiras	Florianópolis
19:30 (UTC−3)	Carlos Alberto 7'; Paulo Roberto (yellow card) 9'; Thiago Santana 61'; Marquinhos (yellow card) 68'; Marcão (yellow card) 87'	Report	Gabriel 10'; Kelvin (yellow card) 25'; Egídio (yellow card) 59'; Ayrton (yellow card) 90+3'	Stadium: Orlando Scarpelli; Attendance: 9,187; Referee: Leandro Vuaden (Rio Grande do Sul)

June 14 7	Palmeiras	2–1	Fluminense	São Paulo
16:00 (UTC−3)	Rafael Marques 45+2'; Cristaldo 90'	Report	Jean 16', (yellow card) 65'; Antônio Carlos (yellow card) 33'; Pierre (yellow card) 56'; Magno Alves (red card) 59'; Marcos Júnior (yellow card) 77'; Gum (yellow card) 78' (yellow-red card) 88'; Renato (yellow card) 86'; Diego Cavalieri (yellow card) 90+1'	Stadium: Allianz Parque; Attendance: 26,181; Referee: Dewson Fernando Freitas da Silva (Pará)

June 20 8	Grêmio	1–0	Palmeiras	Porto Alegre
21:00 (UTC−3)	Rafael Galhardo (yellow card) 29'; Marcelo Oliveira (yellow card) 45'; Maicon 55', (yellow card) 68'; Walace (yellow card) 87'	Report	Gabriel (yellow card) 16'; Robinho (yellow card) 48'; Alecsandro (yellow card) 61'	Stadium: Arena do Grêmio; Attendance: 22,896; Referee: Raphael Claus (São Paulo)

June 28 9	Palmeiras	4–0	São Paulo	São Paulo
16:00 (UTC−3)	Leandro Pereira 31'; Victor Ramos 40'; Lucas (yellow card) 50'; Rafael Marques 58'; Cristaldo 71'	Report	Bruno (yellow card) 17'; Hudson (yellow card) 39'; Toloi (yellow card) 90+2'	Stadium: Allianz Parque; Attendance: 29,233; Referee: Anderson Daronco (Rio Grande do Sul)

July 1 10	Palmeiras	2–0	Chapecoense	São Paulo
21:00 (UTC−3)	Egídio 27'; Cristaldo 69'	Report	Wagner (yellow card) 43'; Neném (yellow card) 64'; Wiliam Barbio (yellow card) 65'	Stadium: Allianz Parque; Attendance: 32,742; Referee: Pablo dos Santos Alves (Paraíba)

July 5 11	Ponte Preta	0–2	Palmeiras	Cuiabá
18:30 (UTC−3)	Cesinha (yellow card) 37'; Vitor Xavier (yellow card) 53'; Pablo (yellow card) 90+2'	Report	Dudu 8', 39', (yellow card) 55'; Lucas (yellow card) 35'; Victor Ramos (yellow card) 51'	Stadium: Arena Pantanal; Attendance: 11,074; Referee: Vinicius Gonçalves Dias Araújo (São Paulo)

July 8 12	Palmeiras	3–0	Avaí	São Paulo
21:00 (UTC−3)	Rafael Marques 7'; Egídio (yellow card) 55'; Victor Ramos (yellow card) 63'; Lucas 64'; Cristaldo 88'	Report	Claudinei (yellow card) 26'; Emerson (yellow card) 71'; Nino Paraíba (yellow card) 83'; Roberto (yellow card) 83'; André Lima (yellow card) 85'; Renan (yellow card) 87'	Stadium: Allianz Parque; Attendance: 37,530; Referee: Igor Junio Benevenuto (Minas Gerais)

July 12 13	Sport	2–2	Palmeiras	São Lourenço da Mata
18:30 (UTC−3)	Matheus Ferraz 21'; Marlone (yellow card) 45+1'; Renê (yellow card) 57'; André 89'	Report	Jackson (yellow card) 35'; Leandro Pereira 43', 58'	Stadium: Arena Pernambuco; Attendance: 35,163; Referee: Emerson de Almeida Ferreira (Minas Gerais)

July 19 14	Palmeiras	1–0	Santos	São Paulo
16:00 (UTC−3)	Leandro Pereira 14'; Leandro Almeida (yellow card) 32'; Arouca (yellow card) 45+3'; Egídio (yellow card) 69'	Report	Ricardo Oliveira (yellow card) 30'; Werley (yellow card) 57'; Neto Berola (yellow card) 90+4'	Stadium: Allianz Parque; Attendance: 38,220; Referee: Wagner do Nascimento Magalhães (Rio de Janeiro)

July 26 15	Vasco	1–4	Palmeiras	Rio de Janeiro
18:30 (UTC−3)	Rodrigo (yellow card) 9'; Dagoberto (yellow card) 20'; Riascos 68'; Mádson (yellow card) 85'	Report	Leandro Pereira 3', 54'; Dudu 17'; Victor Ramos 34', (yellow card) 90+3'	Stadium: São Januário; Attendance: 14,875; Referee: Anderson Daronco (Rio Grande do Sul)

August 2 16	Palmeiras	0–1	Atlético Paranaense	São Paulo
11:00 (UTC−3)	Victor Ramos (yellow card) 65'	Report	Kadu (yellow card) 39'; Walter 77'; Vilches (yellow card) 90+1'	Stadium: Allianz Parque; Attendance: 38,794; Referee: Ricardo Marques Ribeiro (Minas Gerais)

August 9 17	Cruzeiro	2–1	Palmeiras	Belo Horizonte
16:00 (UTC−3)	Alisson 4'; Willians (yellow card) 19'; Vinícius Araújo (yellow card) 45'; Manoel (yellow card) 50'; Fabrício (yellow card) 69'; De Arrascaeta 82'	Report	Victor Ramos (yellow card) 45+2'; Lucas (yellow card) 56'; Cristaldo 74'; Egídio (yellow card) 90+3'	Stadium: Mineirão; Attendance: 20,839; Referee: Wilton Pereira Sampaio (Goiás)

August 12 18	Coritiba	2–1	Palmeiras	Curitiba
19:30 (UTC−3)	Henrique Almeida 17', 82'; Negueba (yellow card) 53'; Rafael Marques P. (yellow card) 70'; Ivan (yellow card) 87'	Report	Egídio (yellow card) 15'; Rafael Marques 45'	Stadium: Couto Pereira; Attendance: 13,373; Referee: Péricles Bassols Pegado Cortez (Rio de Janeiro)

August 16 19	Palmeiras	4–2	Flamengo	São Paulo
11:00 (UTC−3)	Jackson 5'; Lucas (yellow card) 45+1'; Samir 57' (o.g.); Dudu 65'; Alecsandro 70'; Lucas Taylor (yellow card) 90+5'	Report	Jonas (yellow card) 41'; Jorge (yellow card) 43'; Ederson 50', 56'	Stadium: Allianz Parque; Attendance: 37,739; Referee: Igor Junio Benevenuto (Minas Gerais)

August 23 20	Atlético Mineiro	2–1	Palmeiras	Belo Horizonte
18:30 (UTC−3)	Pratto 17', 36' (pen.); Jemerson (yellow card) 68'	Report	Girotto 4'; Lucas (yellow card) 36'; Dudu (yellow card) 76'; Gabriel Jesus (yellow card) 90'	Stadium: Independência; Attendance: 17,464; Referee: Sandro Ricci (Santa Catarina)

August 30 21	Palmeiras	3–2	Joinville	São Paulo
16:00 (UTC−3)	Gabriel Jesus 1', 67'; Dudu 23'	Report	Marcelinho Paraíba 26', 27'; Naldo (yellow card) 37'; Mário Sérgio (yellow card) 61'; Fabrício (yellow card) 90'	Stadium: Allianz Parque; Attendance: 28,907; Referee: Bruno Arleu de Araujo (Rio de Janeiro)

September 2 22	Goiás	1–0	Palmeiras	Goiânia
22:00 (UTC−3)	Alex Alves (yellow card) 8'; Bruno Henrique 62'; Ygor (yellow card) 84'	Report	Gabriel Jesus (yellow card) 9'; Victor Ramos (yellow card) 54'; Vitor Hugo (yellow card) 56'	Stadium: Serra Dourada; Attendance: 16,024; Referee: Leandro Vuaden (Rio Grande do Sul)

September 6 23	Palmeiras	3–3	Corinthians	São Paulo
16:00 (UTC−3)	Lucas (yellow card) 15', (goal) 18'; Gabriel Jesus (yellow card) 22'; Robinho 26', (yellow card) 27'; Dudu 41', (yellow card) 77'; Leandro Almeida (yellow card) 78'; João Paulo (yellow card) 85'	Report	Fagner (yellow card) 14'; Guilherme Arana 24'; Amaral 37' (o.g.); Gil (yellow card) 60'; Vágner Love 78'; Cristian (yellow card) 88'	Stadium: Allianz Parque; Attendance: 35,707; Referee: Raphael Claus (São Paulo)

September 9 24	Internacional	1–0	Palmeiras	Porto Alegre
19:30 (UTC−3)	D'Alessandro (yellow card) 17'; Nílton 19', (red card) 83'; Artur (yellow card) 47'; Sasha (yellow card) 63'; Réver (yellow card) 86'; Paulão (yellow card) 89'	Report	Leandro Almeida (yellow card) 34' (yellow-red card) 46'; Vitor Hugo (yellow card) 55'; Allione (yellow card) 87'	Stadium: Beira-Rio; Attendance: 16,334; Referee: Wagner Reway (Mato Grosso)

September 12 25	Palmeiras	2–0	Figueirense	São Paulo
21:00 (UTC−3)	Egídio (yellow card) 38'; Vitor Hugo (yellow card) 40'; Jackson 46', (yellow card) 52'; Zé Roberto 87' (pen.); Andrei Girotto (yellow card) 90'	Report	Marcão (yellow card) 14'; Leandro Silva (yellow card) 26' (yellow-red card) 90+2'; Paulo Roberto (yellow card) 43'	Stadium: Allianz Parque; Attendance: 22,794; Referee: Wagner do Nascimento Magalhães (Rio de Janeiro)

September 16 26	Fluminense	1–4	Palmeiras	Rio de Janeiro
19:30 (UTC−3)	Jean 36'; Wellington Silva (yellow card) 64'	Report	Egídio (yellow card) 8'; Fernando Prass (yellow card) 59'; Barrios 68', 89', 90+2'; Gabriel Jesus 75'; Thiago Santos (yellow card) 87'	Stadium: Maracanã; Attendance: 11,063; Referee: Anderson Daronco (Rio Grande do Sul)

September 19 27	Palmeiras	3–2	Grêmio	São Paulo
18:30 (UTC−3)	Vitor Hugo 6'; Barrios 31'; Rafael Marques 58'; Arouca (yellow card) 74'; Thiago Santos (yellow card) 83'	Report	Luan 20', 85' (pen.); Bressan (yellow card) 27'; Lucas Ramon (yellow card) 68'; Marcelo Oliveira (yellow card) 87'; Moisés (yellow card) 89'	Stadium: Pacaembu; Attendance: 23,983; Referee: Wilton Pereira Sampaio (Goiás)
Note: This match will be played at the Pacaembu Stadium instead of the Palmeiras regular arena the Allianz Parque due to shows of Rod Stewart and Katy Perry that will happen in the arena in the week of this match.

September 27 28	São Paulo	1–1	Palmeiras	São Paulo
16:00 (UTC−3)	Matheus (yellow card) 45+2'; Carlinhos 60'	Report	Robinho (yellow card) 26', (goal) 90+2'; Thiago Santos (yellow card) 67'	Stadium: Morumbi; Attendance: 25,047; Referee: Anderson Daronco (Rio Grande do Sul)

October 4 29	Chapecoense	5–1	Palmeiras	Chapecó
18:30 (UTC−3)	Neto 5'; Camilo 22'; Túlio de Melo 54'; Apodi 65'; Ananias 86'	Report	Andrei Girotto (yellow card) 48'; Fernando Prass (yellow card) 56'; Dudu 58'; Egídio (yellow card) 60'; Jackson (yellow card) 79'; Gabriel Jesus (yellow card) 84'	Stadium: Arena Condá; Attendance: 16,474; Referee: Jailson Macedo Freitas (Bahia)

October 14 30	Palmeiras	0–1	Ponte Preta	São Paulo
21:00 (UTC−3)	Dudu (yellow card) 57'; Gabriel Jesus (yellow card) 90+2'	Report	Fernando Bob 27' (pen.); Gilson (yellow card) 42'; Jeferson (yellow card) 46'; Cristian (yellow card) 75'	Stadium: Allianz Parque; Attendance: 28,981; Referee: Raphael Claus (São Paulo)

October 17 31	Avaí	1–3	Palmeiras	Florianópolis
18:30 (UTC−3)	Nino Paraíba (yellow card) 5'; Adriano (yellow card) 42'; Marquinhos (yellow card) 45+'; André Lima 68'	Report	Andrei Girotto (yellow card) 13'; Gabriel Jesus 16'; Allione (yellow card) 42'; Thiago Santos (yellow card) 44'; Cristaldo 59'; Dudu 77', (yellow card) 84'	Stadium: Ressacada; Attendance: 9,254; Referee: Marcelo de Lima Henrique (Pernambuco)

October 24 32	Palmeiras	0–2	Sport	São Paulo
21:00 (UTC−2)	Matheus Sales (yellow card) 19'; João Pedro (yellow card) 58'	Report	Marlone 15'; André 58' (pen.); Samuel (yellow card) 89'	Stadium: Pacaembu; Attendance: 21,184; Referee: André Luiz de Freitas Castro (Goiás)

November 1 33	Santos	2–1	Palmeiras	Santos
17:00 (UTC−2)	Thiago Maia 27'; Ricardo Oliveira 48'; Gabriel (yellow card) 66'; Gustavo Henrique (yellow card) 75'; Zeca (yellow card) 90+2'	Report	Zé Roberto (yellow card) 23'; Fernando Prass (yellow card) 39'; Thiago Santos (yellow card) 40'; Dudu 74', (yellow card) 90'; Cristaldo (red card) 90'	Stadium: Vila Belmiro; Attendance: 11,767; Referee: Pericles Bassols Pegado Cortez (Rio de Janeiro)

November 8 34	Palmeiras	0–2	Vasco	São Paulo
17:00 (UTC−2)	Jackson (yellow card) 90'	Report	Riascos (yellow card) 24'; Rafael Silva 34'; Nenê 40'; Luan (yellow card) 47'; Serginho (yellow card) 49'; Mádson (yellow card) 77'	Stadium: Allianz Parque; Attendance: 28,800; Referee: Anderson Daronco (Rio Grande do Sul)

November 18 35	Atlético Paranaense	3–3	Palmeiras	Curitiba
21:00 (UTC−2)	Marcos Guilherme 1'; Cleberson (yellow card) 33'; Ewandro 83', 86'; Hernández (yellow card) 90+1'	Report	Jackson (yellow card) 43' (red card) 90+3', (goal) 73'; Amaral (yellow card) 51'; Robinho 53', (red card) 90+4'; Dudu (yellow card) 82'; Alecsandro (yellow card) 90+2', (goal) 90+4'	Stadium: Arena da Baixada; Attendance: 13,650; Referee: Dewson Fernando Freitas da Silva (Pará)

November 21 36	Palmeiras	1–1	Cruzeiro	São Paulo
19:30 (UTC−2)	Mouche (yellow card) 62'; Leandro Almeida (yellow card) 68'; Barrios 70'	Report	Marcos Vinícius 20'; De Arrascaeta (yellow card) 69'	Stadium: Allianz Parque; Attendance: 19,395; Referee: Elmo Alves Resende Cunha (Goiás)

November 29 37	Palmeiras	0–2	Coritiba	São Paulo
18:00 (UTC−2)	Kelvin (yellow card) 4'; Lucas (yellow card) 54'; Nathan (yellow card) 77'	Report	Negueba (yellow card) 9'; Juan 23'; João Paulo (yellow card) 37'; Alan Santos (yellow card) 45'; Henrique Almeida 90+3'	Stadium: Allianz Parque; Attendance: 15,037; Referee: Igor Junio Benevenuto (Minas Gerais)

December 6 38	Flamengo	1–2	Palmeiras	Rio de Janeiro
17:00 (UTC−2)	Pará 75'	Report	Dudu 71'; Vitor Hugo 89'; Juninho (yellow card) 90+1'	Stadium: Maracanã; Attendance: 16,070; Referee: Wagner Reway (Mato Grosso)

== Statistics ==
=== Overall statistics ===
As of December 6, 2015

Games played	70 (19 Campeonato Paulista, 13 Copa do Brasil, 38 Campeonato Brasileiro Série A)
Games won	35 (12 Campeonato Paulista, 8 Copa do Brasil, 15 Campeonato Brasileiro)
Games drawn	13 (2 Campeonato Paulista, 3 Copa do Brasil, 8 Campeonato Brasileiro)
Games lost	22 (5 Campeonato Paulista, 2 Copa do Brasil, 15 Campeonato Brasileiro)
Goals scored	113
Goals conceded	79
Goal difference	+34 (+14 Campeonato Paulista, +11 Copa do Brasil, +9 Campeonato Brasileiro)
Best result	5–1 (vs. Sampaio Corrêa – Copa do Brasil, May 12)
Worst result	1–5 (vs. Chapecoense – Campeonato Brasileiro, October 4)
Yellow cards	172
Red cards	10
Top scorer	Dudu (16 goals)
Clean sheets	20
Most clean sheets	Fernando Prass (20)
Worst discipline	Lucas (16 (yellow card) , 1 (red card) )

=== Goalscorers ===
In italic players who left the team in mid-season.

Place	Position	Nationality	Number	Name	Campeonato Paulista	Copa do Brasil	Série A	Total
1	FW	(Brazil)	7	Dudu	3	3	10	16
2	FW	(Brazil)	19	Rafael Marques	6	2	7	15
3	FW	(Argentina)	9	Cristaldo	3	3	6	12
4	FW	(Brazil)	17	Leandro Pereira	3	0	6	9
4	MF	(Brazil)	27	Robinho	5	1	3	9
5	FW	(Paraguay)	8	L. Barrios	0	3	5	8
5	DF	(Brazil)	31	Vitor Hugo	2	2	4	8
6	FW	(Brazil)	33	Gabriel Jesus	0	3	4	7
6	DF	(Brazil)	11	Zé Roberto	1	4	2	7
7	DF	(Brazil)	3	Victor Ramos	1	0	2	3
7	DF	(Brazil)	32	Lucas	1	0	2	3
7	DF	(Brazil)	26	Jackson	0	0	3	3
8	MF	(Brazil)	18	Gabriel	1	0	1	2
8	MF	(Brazil)	28	Andrei Girotto	0	1	1	2
8	FW	(Brazil)	90	Alecsandro	0	0	2	2
9	FW	(Brazil)	13	Maikon Leite	1	0	0	1
9	MF	(Argentina)	20	Allione	0	1	0	1
9	DF	(Brazil)	22	João Pedro	1	0	0	1
9	FW	(Brazil)	29	Kelvin	0	1	0	1
9	DF	(Brazil)	66	Egídio	0	0	1	1
9	MF	(Brazil)	10	Cleiton Xavier	0	1	0	1

=== Disciplinary record ===
In italic players who left the team in mid-season.

Number	Nationality	Position	Name	Campeonato Paulista		Copa do Brasil		Série A		Total	
Number	Nationality	Position	Name	Yellow card	Red card	Yellow card	Red card	Yellow card	Red card	Yellow card	Red card
1	(Brazil)	GK	Fernando Prass	3	0	2	0	3	0	8	0
2	(Argentina)	DF	Tobio	2	0	1	0	0	0	3	0
3	(Brazil)	DF	Victor Ramos	2	1	1	0	7	1	10	2
4	(Brazil)	DF	Nathan	0	0	0	0	1	0	1	0
5	(Brazil)	MF	Arouca	4	0	1	1	3	0	8	1
6	(Brazil)	DF	João Paulo	0	0	0	0	1	0	1	0
7	(Brazil)	FW	Dudu	4	1	4	0	7	0	15	1
8	(Paraguay)	FW	Lucas Barrios	0	0	1	0	0	0	1	0
8	(Paraguay)	MF	Mendieta	0	0	0	0	0	0	0	0
9	(Argentina)	FW	Cristaldo	1	0	1	0	0	1	2	1
10	(Brazil)	MF	Cleiton Xavier	1	0	0	0	0	0	1	0
10	(Chile)	MF	Valdivia	1	0	0	0	2	0	3	0
11	(Brazil)	DF	Zé Roberto	2	0	2	0	1	0	5	0
13	(Brazil)	FW	Maikon Leite	0	0	0	0	0	0	0	0
14	(Argentina)	FW	Mouche	0	0	0	0	1	0	1	0
15	(Brazil)	MF	Amaral	0	0	2	0	1	0	3	0
16	(Brazil)	DF	Victor Luis	3	0	0	0	0	0	3	0
17	(Brazil)	FW	Leandro Pereira	3	0	1	0	2	0	6	0
18	(Brazil)	MF	Gabriel	3	0	1	0	2	0	5	0
19	(Brazil)	FW	Rafael Marques	1	0	0	0	0	0	1	0
20	(Argentina)	MF	Allione	1	0	0	0	2	0	3	0
22	(Brazil)	DF	João Pedro	0	0	2	0	1	0	3	0
23	(Brazil)	MF	Renato	1	0	0	0	0	0	1	0
25	(Brazil)	GK	Aranha	0	0	0	0	0	0	0	0
26	(Brazil)	DF	Jackson	1	0	3	0	5	1	9	1
27	(Brazil)	MF	Robinho	3	0	2	0	4	1	9	1
28	(Brazil)	MF	Andrei Girotto	0	0	0	0	3	0	3	0
29	(Brazil)	FW	Kelvin	0	0	1	0	5	0	5	0
30	(Brazil)	MF	Fellype Gabriel	0	0	0	0	0	0	0	0
30	(Brazil)	MF	Alan Patrick	1	0	0	0	0	0	1	0
31	(Brazil)	DF	Vitor Hugo	9	1	1	0	3	0	13	1
32	(Brazil)	DF	Lucas	2	0	4	1	10	0	16	1
33	(Brazil)	FW	Gabriel Jesus	0	0	0	0	5	0	5	0
34	(Brazil)	MF	Juninho	0	0	0	0	1	0	1	0
34	(Brazil)	DF	Wellington	0	0	0	0	0	0	0	0
35	(Brazil)	MF	Thiago Santos	0	0	0	0	5	0	5	0
35	(Brazil)	MF	João Denoni	0	0	0	0	0	0	0	0
36	(Brazil)	MF	Matheus Sales	0	0	2	0	1	0	3	0
36	(Brazil)	DF	Mateus Muller	0	0	0	0	0	0	0	0
38	(Brazil)	FW	Leandro	0	0	0	0	1	0	1	0
39	(Brazil)	MF	Ryder Matos	0	0	0	0	0	0	0	0
41	(Brazil)	DF	Thiago Martins	0	0	0	0	0	0	0	0
42	(Brazil)	DF	Lucas Taylor	0	0	0	0	1	0	1	0
42	(Brazil)	DF	Ayrton	0	0	0	0	1	0	1	0
43	(Brazil)	MF	Luiz Gustavo	0	0	0	0	0	0	0	0
44	(Brazil)	DF	Leandro Almeida	0	0	0	0	5	1	5	1
47	(Brazil)	GK	Fábio	0	0	0	0	0	0	0	0
48	(Brazil)	GK	Vinícius	0	0	0	0	0	0	0	0
49	(Brazil)	GK	Jailson	1	0	0	0	0	0	1	0
66	(Brazil)	DF	Egídio	0	0	0	0	9	0	9	0
90	(Brazil)	FW	Alecsandro	0	0	0	0	2	0	2	0
			TOTALS	49	3	33	2	87	5	172	10
