= João Pedro (footballer, born 15 November 1996) =

Brazilian footballer

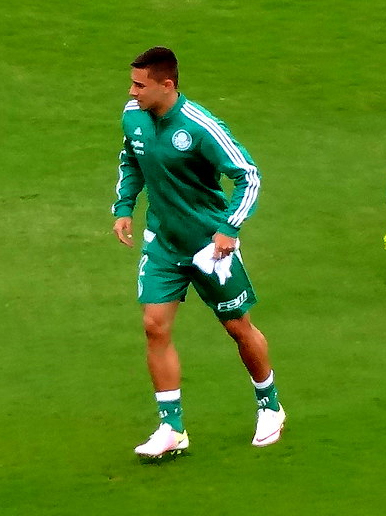
- João Pedro with Palmeiras in 2016

Personal information
- Full name: João Pedro Maturano dos Santos
- Date of birth: 15 November 1996 (age 29)
- Place of birth: Presidente Bernardes, Brazil
- Height: 1.79 m (5 ft 10 in)
- Position: Right-back

Team information
- Current team: Grêmio
- Number: 18

Youth career
- 2010–2012: Olé Brasil
- 2012: Comercial-SP
- 2012–2014: Palmeiras

Senior career*
Years	Team	Apps	(Gls)
2014–2018	Palmeiras	35	(2)
2017	→ Chapecoense (loan)	21	(1)
2018	→ Bahia (loan)	10	(0)
2018–2019	Porto B	21	(3)
2018–2022	Porto	0	(0)
2019–2021	→ Bahia (loan)	18	(1)
2021–2022	→ Corinthians (loan)	6	(0)
2023–	Grêmio	103	(5)

International career
2015	Brazil U20	14	(0)
- * Club domestic league appearances and goals as of 7 April 2026

João Pedro Maturano dos Santos (born 15 November 1996), known as João Pedro, is a Brazilian professional footballer who plays as a right-back for Série A club Grêmio.

== Club career ==
=== Palmeiras ===
A Palmeiras youth graduate, João Pedro was born in Presidente Bernardes, São Paulo. In September 2014, aged just 17, he was called up to the first team by manager Dorival Júnior.

On 17 September 2014, João Pedro made his first team – and Série A – debut, starting in a 2–2 home draw against Flamengo. He scored his first goal on 11 October, netting the winner in a 2–1 home success over Grêmio, and finished the year as a starter as his side narrowly avoided relegation.

After the arrival of Lucas and João Paulo, João Pedro was only utilized as a backup during the 2015 campaign, but he did play in the second leg of the 2015 Copa do Brasil Finals against Santos (2–2, 4–3 win on penalties). The same occurred the following year, as he served as Jean's backup and lifted the Brasileirão trophy, but appearing rarely.

==== Chapecoense (loan) ====
On 10 January 2017, João Pedro was officially presented at Chapecoense, after agreeing to a one-year loan deal with the club. He played 12 games as the team mourning the recent death of most of its players won the Campeonato Catarinense, scoring once in a 4–1 home win over Brusque on 29 March.

==== Bahia (loan) ====
At the start of 2018, João Pedro was sent on loan to Bahia for the whole of 2018. He played seven games as they too were crowned state champions.

=== Porto ===
On 7 June 2018, João Pedro signed for FC Porto on a five-year contract for a fee of €4 million. Used mainly for the reserve team in LigaPro, he played just three games in cups in his first season, starting with a 1–1 home draw with G.D. Chaves in the Taça da Liga group stage on 14 September.

==== Bahia (second loan) ====
On 30 July 2019, João Pedro returned to Bahia on loan until the end of 2020. He was part of the squad that won the 2020 Campeonato Baiano, but was unused in the final penalty shootout victory over Atlético Alagoinhas in the final on 8 August; he played 12 games in the Copa do Nordeste including both legs of the 4–1 aggregate final loss to Ceará. In January 2021, João Pedro's loan to Bahia was extended until 30 June of the same year.

==== Corinthians (loan) ====
On 31 August 2021, Porto sent João Pedro on loan to Série A club Corinthians until 30 June 2022. He made just 8 appearances in all competitions for the São Paulo-based side, returning to Porto in July 2022.

=== Grêmio ===
On 13 January 2023, João Pedro left Porto on a permanent deal, joining recently promoted to Série A Grêmio. He signed a one-year contract, with an option for a further year.

== Career statistics ==
As of match played 12 November 2023

Club	Season	League			State league		National cup (Note: Includes Copa do Brasil, Taça de Portugal)		Continental		Other		Total	
Club	Season	Division	Apps	Goals	Apps	Goals	Apps	Goals	Apps	Goals	Apps	Goals	Apps	Goals
Palmeiras	2014	Série A	17	1	0	0	0	0	—		—		17	1
Palmeiras	2015	Série A	11	0	2 (Note: Appearances in Campeonato Paulista)	1	3	0	—		—		16	1
Palmeiras	2016	Série A	1	0	4	0	0	0	0	0	—		5	0
Palmeiras	Total		29	1	6	1	3	0	0	0	—		38	2
Chapecoense (loan)	2017	Série A	9	0	12 (Note: Appearances in Campeonato Catarinense)	1	0	0	5 (Note: Appearances in Copa Libertadores)	0	3 (Note: Two appearances in Recopa Sudamericana, one appearance in Primeira Liga)	0	29	1
Bahia (loan)	2018	Série A	3	0	7 (Note: Appearance(s) in Campeonato Baiano)	0	1	0	2 (Note: Appearance(s) in Copa Sudamericana)	0	3 (Note: Appearances in Copa do Nordeste)	0	16	0
Porto B	2018–19	LigaPro	21	3	—		—		—		—		21	3
Porto	2018–19	Primeira Liga	0	0	—		1	0	0	0	2 (Note: Appearances in Taça da Liga)	0	3	0
Bahia (loan)	2019	Série A	12	1	—		0	0	0	0	0	0	12	1
Bahia (loan)	2020	Série A	5	0	1	0	1	0	2	0	12	0	21	0
Bahia (loan)	2021	Série A	0	0	0	0	1	0	1	0	5	0	7	0
Bahia (loan)	Total		17	1	1	0	2	0	3	0	17	0	40	1
Corinthians (loan)	2021	Série A	1	0	0	0	0	0	0	0	—		1	0
Corinthians (loan)	2022	Série A	2	0	3	0	0	0	2	0	—		7	0
Corinthians (loan)	Total		3	0	3	0	0	0	2	0	—		8	0
Grêmio	2023	Série A	28	3	7 (Note: Appearances in Campeonato Gaúcho)	0	8	0	—		0	0	43	3
Career total			110	8	36	2	15	0	12	0	25	0	198	10

== Honours ==
Palmeiras

- Campeonato Brasileiro Série A: 2016
- Copa do Brasil: 2015

Chapecoense

- Campeonato Catarinense: 2017

Bahia

- Campeonato Baiano: 2018, 2020

Grêmio

- Campeonato Gaúcho: 2023, 2024, 2026
- Recopa Gaúcha: 2023, 2025
