= Mario Sergio =

Mario Sergio may refer to:

- Mário Sérgio (actor) (born 1929), Brazilian actor
- Mario Sergio (politician) (born 1940), Canadian politician
- Mário Sérgio (footballer, born 1950) (1950–2016), Brazilian football manager and former midfielder
- Mário Sérgio (footballer, born 1977), Brazilian football midfielder
- Mário Sérgio (footballer, born 1981), Portuguese football right-back
- Mario Sergio Angulo (born 1983), Colombian footballer
- Mario Sérgio Lotufo (born 1960), Brazilian water polo player
- Mário Sérgio (footballer, born 1992), Brazilian football defender
- Mário Sérgio (footballer, born 1995), Brazilian football forward
