= Kelvin (footballer, born 1993) =

Brazilian footballer

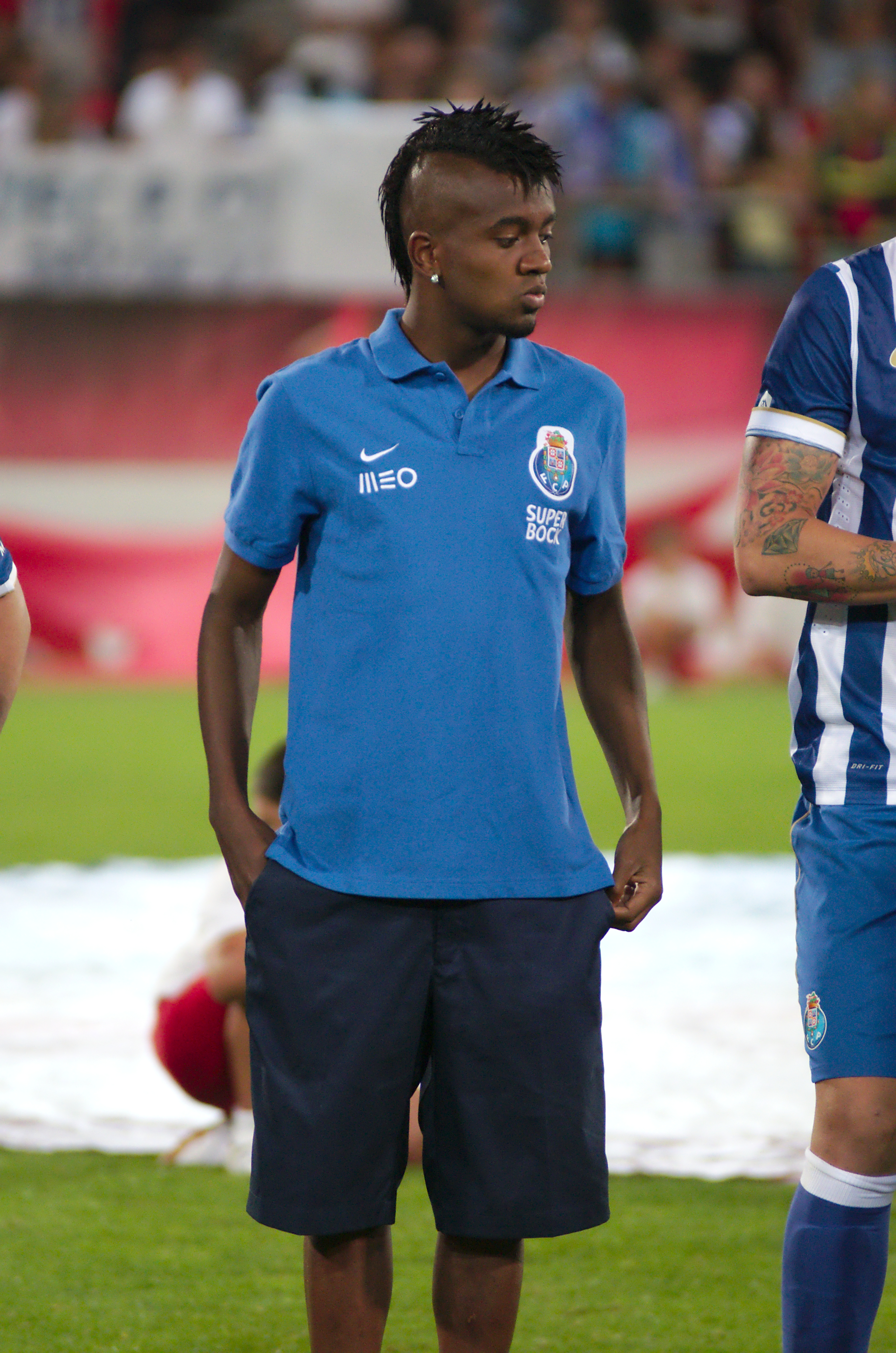
- Kelvin with Porto in 2013

Personal information
- Full name: Kelvin Mateus de Oliveira
- Date of birth: 1 June 1993 (age 33)
- Place of birth: Curitiba, Brazil
- Height: 1.73 m (5 ft 8 in)
- Position: Winger

Team information
- Current team: Uthai Thani
- Number: 22

Youth career
- 2003–2010: Paraná

Senior career*
Years	Team	Apps	(Gls)
2010–2011	Paraná	27	(6)
2011–2014	Porto B	31	(4)
2011–2012	→ Rio Ave (loan)	22	(0)
2012–2019	Porto	15	(3)
2015	→ Palmeiras (loan)	18	(0)
2016	→ São Paulo (loan)	33	(2)
2017–2018	→ Vasco da Gama (loan)	30	(1)
2019	Fluminense	1	(0)
2019	Coritiba	9	(1)
2020	Avaí	9	(0)
2020–2021	Botafogo	5	(0)
2021	Vila Nova	43	(3)
2022	Always Ready	0	(0)
2022–2024	Ryukyu	44	(3)
2024	Remo	17	(0)
2025	Volta Redonda	10	(1)
2025	Náutico	16	(0)
2026–	Uthai Thani	14	(0)

International career
2014	Brazil U21	2	(0)
- * Club domestic league appearances and goals as of 22:37, 3 May 2026 (UTC)

Kelvin Mateus de Oliveira (born 1 June 1993), known simply as Kelvin, is a Brazilian professional footballer who plays as a winger for Thai League 1 club Uthai Thani.

He played for five of the Campeonato Brasileiro Série A's Big Twelve, as well as three other clubs in Série B. Abroad, he represented Porto, where he contributed to a Primeira Liga title in 2013.

== Club career ==
=== Early years and Porto ===
Born in Curitiba, Paraná, Kelvin spent two seasons with local Paraná Clube in the Série B. In late June 2011, aged only 18, he signed with FC Porto in Portugal.

Together with teammate Christian Atsu, Kelvin was sent on loan to fellow Primeira Liga club Rio Ave F.C. for the 2011–12 campaign. He made his debut in the competition on 21 August 2011, in a 1–0 away loss to Académica de Coimbra.

Kelvin returned to Porto for 2012–13, spending most of the season with the reserves in the Segunda Liga. He managed to score, however, three important goals for the first team as a substitute, helping to home wins against S.C. Braga (3–1) and S.L. Benfica (2–1), the latter coming in the 92nd minute.

=== Loans ===
On 13 January 2015, Kelvin joined SE Palmeiras on a loan deal. He played five games as they won the Copa do Brasil that year, and scored in a 5–1 home victory (6–2 aggregate) in the second leg of the second round against Sampaio Corrêa Futebol Clube on 12 May.

Kelvin moved to São Paulo FC, also on loan, on 2 February 2016. On 6 April, he recorded the first continental goal of his career, in a 6–0 home thrashing of Venezuela's Trujillanos F.C. in the group stage of the Copa Libertadores. He scored once in the national league on 11 September, opening a 3–1 defeat of Figueirense FC.

On 3 February 2017, Kelvin was loaned to CR Vasco da Gama. Limited by injury in his first year in Rio de Janeiro, he nonetheless had his link extended the following January; he scored once on 5 May 2018 to conclude a 4–1 win over América Futebol Clube after coming on as a substitute.

=== Later career ===
In late April 2019, free agent Kelvin signed with Fluminense FC until the end of the season. He left three months later having played for only two minutes, agreeing to a contract at Coritiba Foot Ball Club. In nine games for his hometown team in the second tier he scored once, to open a 2–0 victory at Grêmio Esportivo Brasil on 12 November; this was his first strike in 18 months.

On 5 February 2020, having won promotion with Coritiba, Kelvin joined Avaí FC on a one-year deal. He was released on 21 May, having made four goalless appearances, so that the club could add Renato to their payroll. In August, he began training with the club again, who had retained his registration.

Kelvin returned to the top flight on 6 October 2020, with strugglers Botafogo de Futebol e Regatas; he signed to the end of the season, with the option of two more. The following 5 March, following their relegation, he joined Vila Nova Futebol Clube also in division two.

In June 2022, Kelvin was unveiled as FC Ryukyu's new signing. During his time at the club, he was partially paid in cryptocurrency; he was also relegated to J3 League in his debut campaign.

Kelvin went back to Brazil on 19 January 2024, on a one-year contract at Clube do Remo in the Série C.

== Career statistics ==
As of match played 25 November 2023

Appearances and goals by club, season and competition
Club	Season	League			State league		National cup		League cup		Continental		Other		Total	
Club	Season	Division	Apps	Goals	Apps	Goals	Apps	Goals	Apps	Goals	Apps	Goals	Apps	Goals	Apps	Goals
Paraná	2010	Série B	11	2	0	0	0	0	—		—		—		11	2
Paraná	2011	Série B	4	1	12 (Note: Appearances in Campeonato Paranaense)	3	4	2	—		—		—		20	6
Paraná	Total		15	3	12	3	4	2	—		—		—		31	8
Rio Ave (loan)	2011–12	Primeira Liga	22	0	—		2	2	3	0	—		—		27	2
Porto B	2012–13	Segunda Liga	13	2	—		—		—		—		—		13	2
Porto B	2013–14	Segunda Liga	11	0	—		—		—		—		—		11	0
Porto B	2014–15	Segunda Liga	7	2	—		—		—		—		—		7	2
Porto B	Total		31	4	—		—		—		—		—		31	4
Porto	2012–13	Primeira Liga	8	3	—		1	0	3	0	0	0	0	0	12	3
Porto	2013–14	Primeira Liga	6	0	—		3	1	1	0	1 (Note: Appearance in UEFA Europa League)	0	1 (Note: Appearance in Supertaça Cândido de Oliveira)	0	12	1
Porto	2014–15	Primeira Liga	0	0	—		0	0	0	0	1 (Note: Appearance in UEFA Champions League)	0	—		1	0
Porto	2016–17	Primeira Liga	1	0	—		0	0	0	0	0	0	—		1	0
Porto	Total		15	3	—		4	1	4	0	2	0	1	0	26	4
Palmeiras (loan)	2015	Série A	16	0	2 (Note: Appearances in Campeonato Paulista)	0	5	1	—		—		—		23	1
São Paulo (loan)	2016	Série A	27	1	6	1	2	0	—		8 (Note: Appearances in Copa Libertadores)	1	—		43	3
Vasco da Gama (loan)	2017	Série A	5	0	6 (Note: Appearances in Campeonato Carioca)	0	4	0	—		—		—		15	0
Vasco da Gama (loan)	2018	Série A	19	1	0	0	2	0	—		3 (Note: Two appearances in Copa Libertadores, one appearance in Copa Sudamericana)	0	—		24	1
Vasco da Gama (loan)	Total		24	1	6	0	6	0	—		3	0	—		39	1
Fluminense	2019	Série A	1	0	0	0	0	0	—		0	0	—		1	0
Coritiba	2019	Série B	9	1	0	0	0	0	—		—		—		9	1
Avaí	2020	Série B	5	0	4 (Note: Appearances in Campeonato Catarinense)	0	0	0	—		—		—		9	0
Botafogo	2020	Série A	5	0	0	0	2	0	—		—		—		7	0
Vila Nova	2021	Série B	30	0	13 (Note: Appearances in Campeonato Goiano)	3	3	0	—		—		1 (Note: Appearance in Copa Verde)	0	47	3
Always Ready	2022	Bolivian Primera División	0	0	—		0	0	—		0	0	—		0	0
Ryukyu	2022	J2 League	17	1	—		0	0	—		—		—		17	1
Ryukyu	2023	J3 League	27	2	—		1	0	—		—		—		28	2
Ryukyu	Total		44	3	—		1	0	—		—		—		45	3
Career total			244	16	43	7	29	6	7	0	13	1	2	0	338	30

== Honours ==
Porto

- Primeira Liga: 2012–13
- Supertaça Cândido de Oliveira: 2013
- Taça da Liga runner-up: 2012–13

Palmeiras

- Copa do Brasil: 2015
