= Robinho (footballer, born November 1987) =

Brazilian footballer

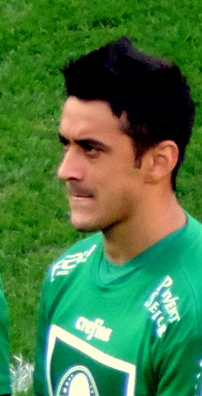
- Robinho with Palmeiras in 2015

Personal information
- Full name: Róbson Michael Signorini
- Date of birth: 10 November 1987 (age 39)
- Place of birth: Marialva, Brazil
- Height: 1.70 m (5 ft 7 in)
- Position: Midfielder

Team information
- Current team: Brusque
- Number: 10

Youth career
- 2001–2005: Internacional
- 2007: Cruzeiro

Senior career*
Years	Team	Apps	(Gls)
2005–2006	Varginha	12	(2)
2006	→ Democrata-SL (loan)		
2007–2008	Mogi Mirim	42	(15)
2008–2011	Santos	58	(6)
2010	→ Avaí (loan)	37	(7)
2011–2012	Avaí	34	(5)
2012–2014	Coritiba	105	(13)
2015–2017	Palmeiras	72	(11)
2016–2017	→ Cruzeiro (loan)	65	(15)
2018–2020	Cruzeiro	112	(8)
2020–2021	Grêmio	16	(0)
2021–2022	Coritiba	47	(0)
2023	Avaí	6	(0)
2023–2024	Paysandu	56	(2)
2025–	Brusque		
- * Club domestic league appearances and goals as of 25 January 2025

Róbson Michael Signorini (born 10 November 1987), commonly known as Robinho, is a Brazilian footballer who plays as a midfielder for Brusque.

== Career ==
Robson was formed in the basic categories of International and further excel in Mogi Mirim in 2008, where he was the top scorer of the second division team in São Paulo, Robson hit three-year contract with Santos. It also is nicknamed Robinho but prefers to be called Robson.

In December 2009, agreed with your Avai release was a condition of hiring Marquinhos by Santos.

After a one-year loan to Avaí, Robson returned to Santos in January 2011.

On 4 February 2011, Robson signed a pre-contract with Avaí, and the contract runs out in May, when the player's contract with Santos end.

He left Santos to play as a regular starter for Avaí on 3 May 2011.

On 12 January 2015, Robinho was signed by Palmeiras.

On December 26, 2025, Robinho announced his retirement from professional football at the age of 38 via a post on social media. Throughout his career, Robinho played for Santos, Avaí, Coritiba, Palmeiras, Cruzeiro, Grêmio, Paysandu and, most recently, Brusque. He played a total of 821 matches, scoring 115 goals and providing 117 assists. Among his major promotions, he won Serie A with Coritiba in 2021, Serie B with Paysandu in 2023, and the Serie A1 of the Campeonato Paulista with Mogi Mirim.

His trophy cabinet includes the 2011 Libertadores with Santos and three Copa do Brasil titles—one with "Peixe" in 2015, and two with Cruzeiro in 2017 and 2018. He was also a state champion in various federations: Catarinense (twice), Gaúcho, Paulista, Paranaense (twice), Paraense, and Mineiro (twice).

== Career statistics ==
As of 19 October 2018

Club	Season	League			State League		National Cup		Continental		Other		Total	
Club	Season	Division	Apps	Goals	Apps	Goals	Apps	Goals	Apps	Goals	Apps	Goals	Apps	Goals
Varginha	2005	Mineiro 2ª Divisão	—		12	2	—		—		—		12	2
Mogi Mirim	2007	Paulista A2	—		18	7	—		—		21 (Note: Appearance(s) in Copa Paulista)	9	39	16
Mogi Mirim	2008	Paulista A2	—		24	8	—		—		—		24	8
Mogi Mirim	Total		—		42	15	—		—		21	9	63	24
Santos	2008	Série A	9	0	—		—		—		—		9	0
Santos	2009	Série A	23	4	12	2	0	0	—		—		35	6
Santos	2011	Série A	0	0	10	0	—		0	0	—		10	0
Santos	Total		32	4	22	2	0	0	0	0	—		54	6
Avaí	2010	Série A	28	5	—		3	2	6 (Note: Appearance(s) in Copa Sudamericana)	0	—		37	7
Avaí	2011	Série A	29	5	—		3	0	—		—		32	5
Avaí	2012	Série B	2	0	17	2	0	0	—		—		19	2
Avaí	Total		59	10	17	2	6	2	6	0	—		88	14
Coritiba	2012	Série A	25	3	—		—		1	0	—		26	3
Coritiba	2013	Série A	29	5	20	5	2	0	2	0	—		53	10
Coritiba	2014	Série A	30	3	10	0	7	2	—		—		47	5
Coritiba	Total		84	11	30	5	9	7	3	0	—		126	18
Palmeiras	2015	Série A	25	3	18	5	8	1	—		—		51	9
Palmeiras	2016	Série A	0	0	15	2	0	0	6 (Note: Appearance(s) in Copa Libertadores)	0	—		21	2
Palmeiras	Total		25	3	33	7	8	1	6	0	—		52	9
Cruzeiro	2016	Série A	24	4	—		6	3	—		—		30	7
Cruzeiro	2017	Série A	18	3	7	2	8	3	0	0	2 (Note: Appearance(s) in Primeira Liga)	0	35	8
Cruzeiro	2018	Série A	20	1	14	1	8	1	8	1	—		50	4
Cruzeiro	Total		62	8	21	3	22	7	8	1	1	0	115	19
Career Total			224	32	163	35	32	15	15	0	22	9	436	84

== Honours ==
=== Club ===
Avaí

- Campeonato Catarinense: 2010, 2012

Coritiba

- Campeonato Paranaense: 2013

Palmeiras

- Copa do Brasil: 2015

Paysandu

- Campeonato Paraense: 2024
- Copa Verde: 2024

=== Individual ===
- Campeonato Paulista Team of the year: 2015
