= William Kozlowski =

Brazilian footballer

Personal information
- Full name: William Kozlowski Alves da Silva
- Date of birth: 19 November 1983 (age 42)
- Place of birth: Curitiba, Brazil
- Height: 1.81 m (5 ft 11 in)
- Position: Attacking midfielder

Team information
- Current team: Athletic-MG

Youth career
- 1997–2003: Paraná

Senior career*
Years	Team	Apps	(Gls)
2002–2005	Paraná	17	(2)
2006–2010	J. Malucelli	?	(?)
2007	→ Figueirense (loan)	?	(?)
2007	→ Marília (loan)	?	(?)
2010	Paraná	22	(4)
2011	Grêmio Prudente	0	(0)
2011	Caldense	0	(0)
2011	Cuiabá	9	(3)
2012–2013	Brasil de Pelotas	7	(3)
2014	Aparecidense	0	(0)
2014	Campinense	0	(0)
2014	Caldas Novas	?	(?)
2015	Aparecidense	0	(0)
2015–2016	Goiás	14	(0)
2016	Tupi	11	(0)
2016	Aparecidense	7	(2)
2016	Goiânia	?	(?)
2017	Cruzeiro RS	0	(0)
2017	Ypiranga	15	(1)
2018	Cruzeiro RS	0	(0)
2018	Novo Hamburgo	5	(1)
2018	Vila Fanny FC	?	(?)
2019	Goianésia	0	(0)
2019–	Athletic-MG	?	(?)
- * Club domestic league appearances and goals as of 24 May 2016

William Kozlowski Alves da Silva (born 19 November 1983), known as William Kozlowski, is a Brazilian footballer who plays as an attacking midfielder for Athletic-MG as an attacking midfielder.
