= Péricles (footballer, born 1994) =

Brazilian footballer

Personal information
- Full name: Péricles da Silva Nunes
- Date of birth: 24 March 1994 (age 32)
- Place of birth: Goiânia, Brazil
- Height: 1.76 m (5 ft 9 in)
- Position: Defensive midfielder

Youth career
- Goiás

Senior career*
Years	Team	Apps	(Gls)
2012–2019	Goiás	17	(1)
2012	→ Aparecidense (loan)	1	(0)
2016	→ Goianésia (loan)	1	(0)
2017	→ Anapolina (loan)		
2018	→ Oeste (loan)	2	(0)
2020	Grêmio Anápolis	1	(0)
2020–2021	São José		
2021	Imperatriz		
2021	Anapolina		
- * Club domestic league appearances and goals

Péricles da Silva Nunes (born 24 March 1994), simply known as Péricles, is a Brazilian former footballer who played as a defensive midfielder.

== Club career ==
Born in Goiânia, Goiás, Péricles graduated with Goiás' youth setup, and made his senior debuts while on loan at Aparecidense in 2012. On 7 January 2015, he was promoted to the main squad by manager Wagner Lopes.

On 16 May 2015 Péricles made his Série A debut, starting in a 2–0 home win against Atlético Paranaense.
