= Leandro Pereira =

Brazilian footballer

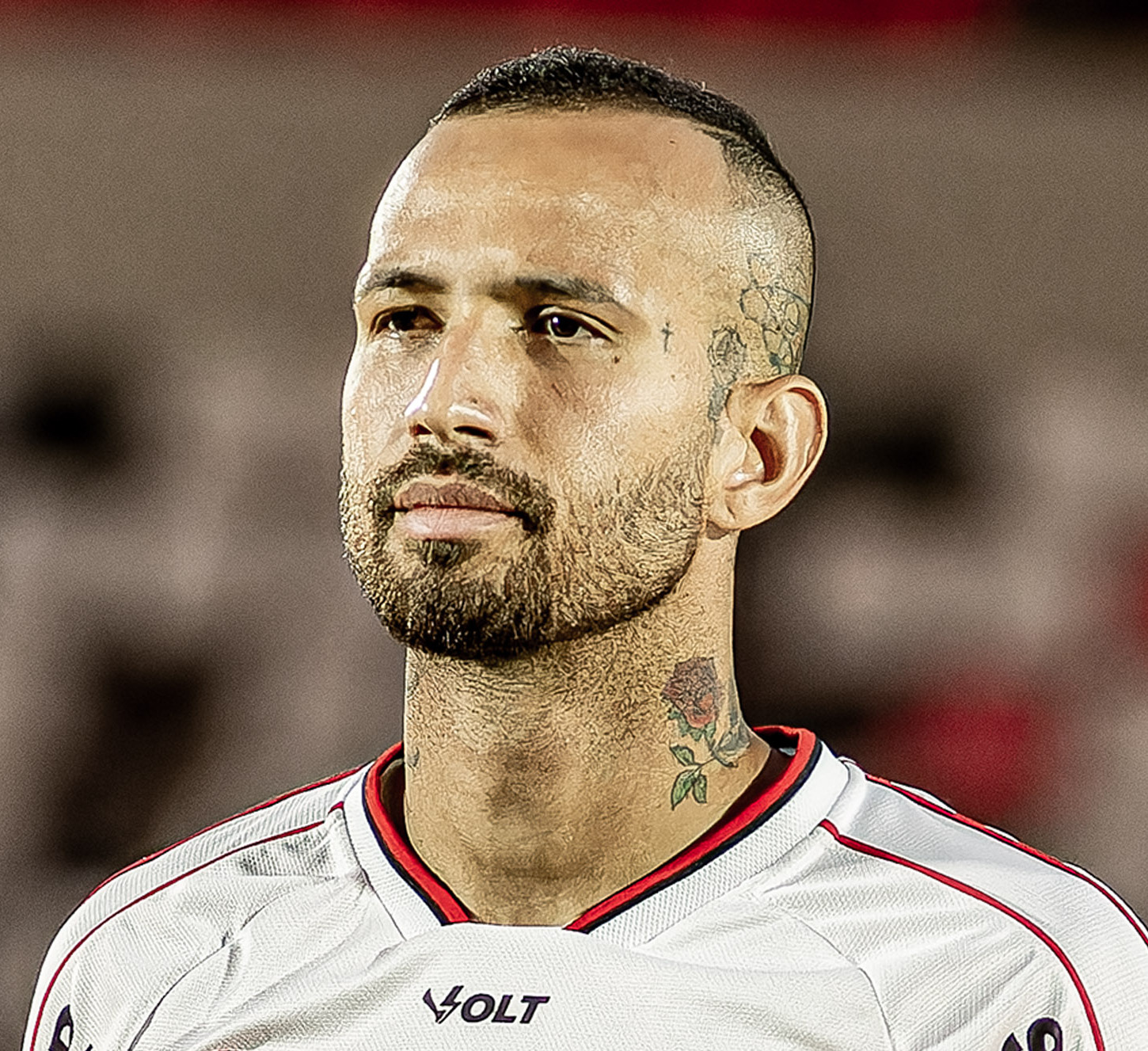
- Leandro Pereira in 2024

Personal information
- Full name: Leandro Marcos Peruchena Pereira
- Date of birth: 13 July 1991 (age 35)
- Place of birth: Araçatuba, Brazil
- Height: 1.90 m (6 ft 3 in)
- Position: Forward

Team information
- Current team: Botafogo-SP

Youth career
- Ferroviária

Senior career*
Years	Team	Apps	(Gls)
2011–2012	Ferroviária	7	(3)
2012	→ Mogi Mirim (loan)	2	(0)
2013–2014	Capivariano	18	(3)
2013	→ Icasa (loan)	18	(4)
2014–2015	Cianorte		
2014	→ Portuguesa (loan)	12	(3)
2014	→ Chapecoense (loan)	24	(10)
2015	Palmeiras	25	(9)
2015–2018	Club Brugge	17	(0)
2016	→ Palmeiras (loan)	10	(2)
2017–2018	→ Sport Recife (loan)	12	(1)
2018	→ Chapecoense (loan)	34	(11)
2019–2020	Matsumoto Yamaga	12	(2)
2019–2020	→ Sanfrecce Hiroshima (loan)	35	(19)
2021–2023	Gamba Osaka	47	(9)
2023	Persepolis	9	(1)
2023	Tochigi	3	(1)
2024–	Botafogo-SP	2	(0)
- * Club domestic league appearances and goals as of 02:54, 14 February 2024 (UTC)

Leandro Marcos Peruchena Pereira (born 13 July 1991), known as Leandro Pereira or sometimes as just Leandro, is a Brazilian professional footballer who plays as a forward for Botafogo-SP.

== Career ==
=== Early years ===
Born in Araçatuba, State of São Paulo, Leandro began his career on Ferroviária, making his senior debuts in 2011. In the following year he signed with Mogi Mirim, where he earned the nickname of Leandro Banana and went on to appear twice in that year's Campeonato Paulista. In December 2012 he signed with Capivariano, but left the club in May of the following year, joining Icasa.

In January 2014 Leandro signed a short-term contract with Portuguesa.

=== Chapecoense ===
On 1 April, after appearing regularly with Lusa, Leandro moved to Chapecoense, freshly promoted to the Série A. He made his top level debut on 27 April 2014, starting in a 1–2 away loss against Sport Recife.

Leandro scored his first league goal on 25 September 2014, netting the last of a 3–0 home win against Atlético Paranaense. He finished the campaign with 10 goals, scoring all of them in the last four months of the League.

=== Palmeiras ===
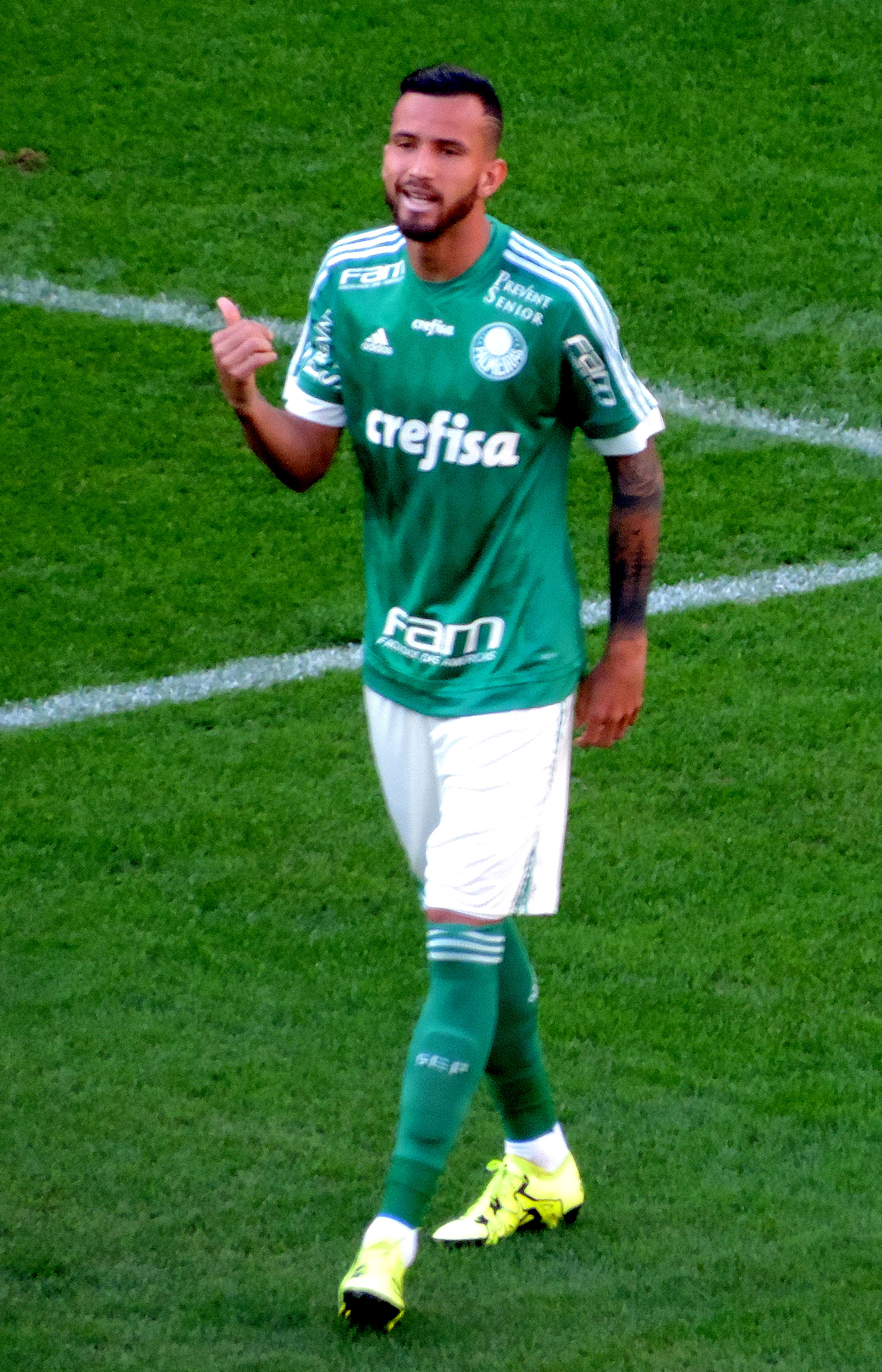
Leandro playing for Palmeiras in 2015

On 19 December 2014, after being linked with a move to Corinthians, Leandro signed a five-year deal with their fierce rivals Palmeiras. He started the 2015 season with Palmeiras playing regularly in the attack, he scored in his first match for the club in a friendly against Shandong Luneng. Leandro scored only 3 goals in 14 appearances in the Campeonato Paulista, but nonetheless helped the team reach the finals where Palmeiras lost to rivals Santos on penalties.

In the beginning of the Série A, Leandro started most of the matches and had great appearances for the team, playing 11 matches and scoring 6 goals. On July, he called the attention of Belgian side Club Brugge, after only 7 months with Palmeiras.

=== Brugge ===
In August 2015, Leandro Pereira signed with Club Brugge on a three-year deal for R$14.2 million, with an option to extend a year. Together with the team, he won the 2015–16 Belgian Pro League, playing 12 matches mainly as a substitute and without scoring a goal.

==== Return to Palmeiras (loan) ====
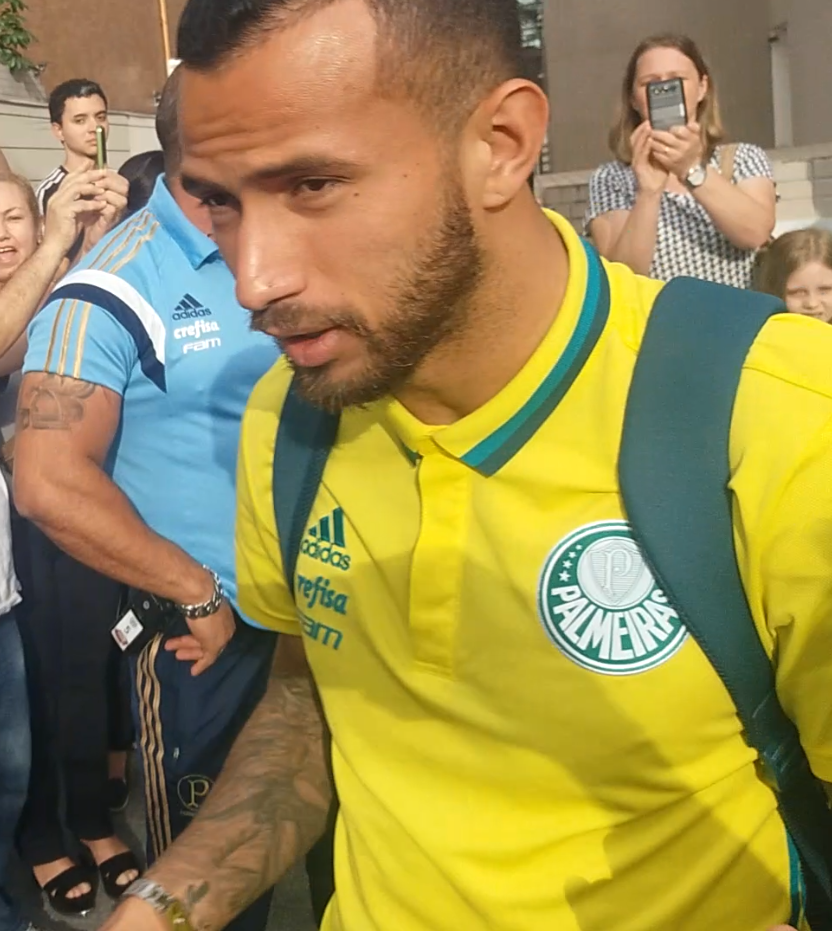
Leandro in 2016

On 29 June 2016, Leandro returned to Palmeiras after manifestation of manager Cuca to count on another forward in the squad. Leandro signed a loan deal from Club Brugge until 30 June 2017.

=== Persepolis ===
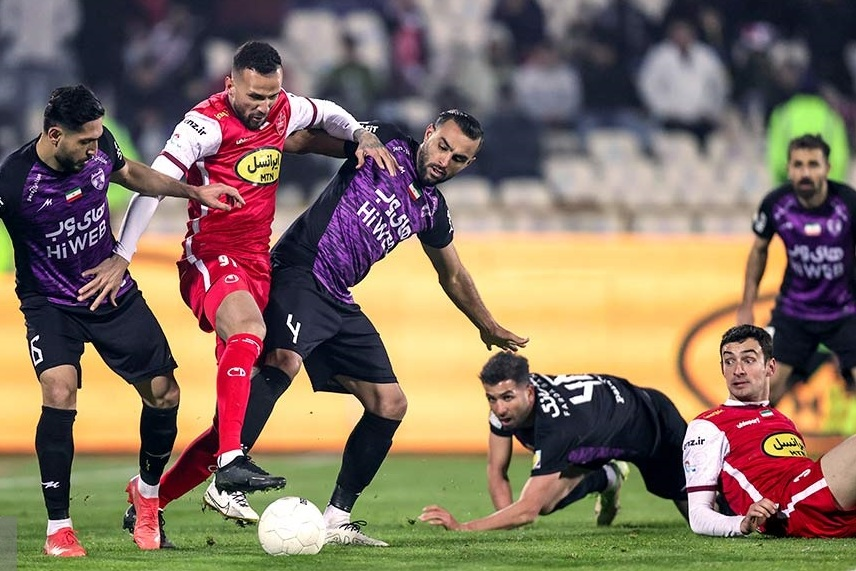
Leandro (left; in red) in action for Persepolis against Havadar defenders in 2023

In 24 January 2023, Leandro linked with Persian Gulf Pro League side Persepolis. On 4 February 2023, Leandro joined the team on a one-and-a-half-year deal.

== Style of play ==
Pereira is a forward, but he has the ability to play as a left or right winger too. Accurate shots in difficult situations towards the goal have been known as one of his abilities.

== Career statistics ==
As of 24 September 2023

Appearances and goals by club, season and competition
Club	Season	League			State League		National cup		League cup		Continental		Other		Total	
Club	Season	Division	Apps	Goals	Apps	Goals	Apps	Goals	Apps	Goals	Apps	Goals	Apps	Goals	Apps	Goals
Mogi Mirim	2012	Paulista A1	—		2	0	—		—		—		—		2	0
Capivariano	2013	Paulista A2	—		18	3	—		—		—		—		18	3
Icasa (loan)	2013	Série B	18	4	—		—		—		—		—		18	4
Portuguesa (loan)	2014	Série B	—		12	3	—		—		—		—		12	3
Chapecoense (loan)	2014	Série A	24	10	—		2	1	—		—		—		26	11
Palmeiras	2015	Série A	11	6	14	3	3	0	—		—		—		28	9
Club Brugge	2015–16	Belgian Pro League	17	0	—		0	0	—		6	0	—		23	0
Palmeiras (loan)	2016	Série A	10	2	—		1	0	—		—		—		11	2
Sport Recife (loan)	2017	Série A	2	0	5	1	6	3	—		1	0	7	0	21	4
Sport Recife (loan)	2018	Série A	—		5	0	2	2	—		—		—		7	2
Sport Recife (loan)	Total		2	0	10	1	8	5	—		1	0	7	0	28	6
Chapecoense (loan)	2018	Série A	34	11	—		—		—		—		—		34	11
Matsumoto Yamaga	2019	J1 League	12	2	—		0	0	2	0	—		—		14	2
Sanfrecce Hiroshima (loan)	2019	J1 League	9	4	—		1	0	1	2	—		—		11	6
Sanfrecce Hiroshima (loan)	2020	J1 League	26	15	—		—		1	1	—		—		27	16
Sanfrecce Hiroshima (loan)	Total		35	19	—		1	0	2	3	—		—		38	22
Gamba Osaka	2021	J1 League	24	5	—		1	0	2	0	6	2	1	0	34	7
Gamba Osaka	2022	J1 League	23	4	—		1	0	4	0	—		—		28	4
Gamba Osaka	Total		47	9	—		2	0	6	0	6	2	1	0	62	11
Persepolis	2022–23	Persian Gulf Pro League	9	1	—		2	0	—		—		—		11	1
Tochigi	2023	J2 League	3	1	—		—		—		—		—		3	1
Career total			222	65	56	10	19	6	10	3	13	2	8	0	328	86

== Honours ==
Mogi Mirim

- Campeonato Paulista do Interior: 2012

Palmeiras

- Campeonato Brasileiro Série A: 2016
- Copa do Brasil: 2015

Club Brugge

- Belgian Pro League: 2015–16

Persepolis

- Persian Gulf Pro League: 2022–23
- Hazfi Cup: 2022–23
- Iranian Super Cup: 2023
