= Vitor Hugo (footballer, born 1991) =

Brazilian footballer

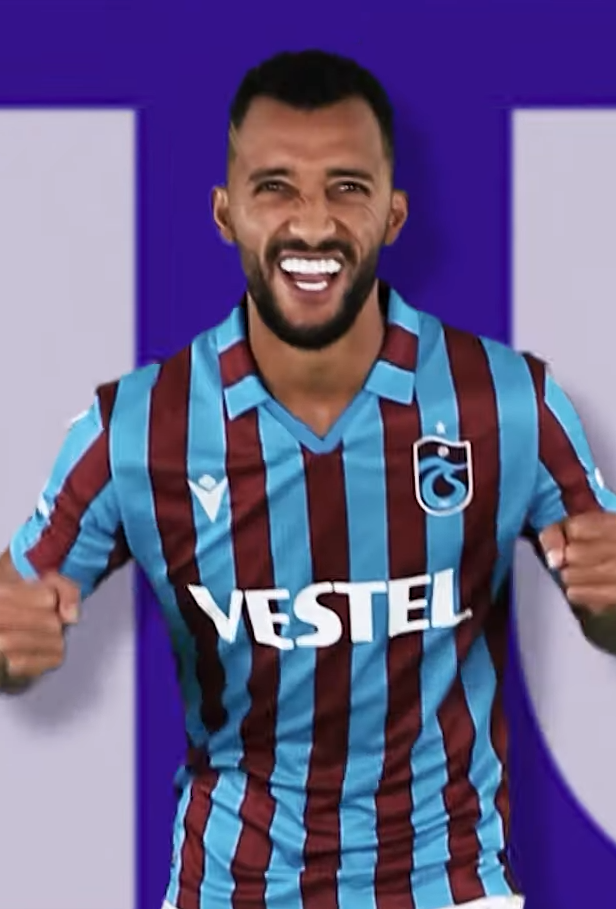
- Vitor Hugo with Trabzonspor in 2021

Personal information
- Full name: Vitor Hugo Franchescoli de Souza
- Date of birth: 20 May 1991 (age 35)
- Place of birth: Guaraci, Brazil
- Height: 1.87 m (6 ft 2 in)
- Position: Centre-back

Team information
- Current team: Atlético Mineiro
- Number: 14

Youth career
- 2007–2010: Santo André

Senior career*
Years	Team	Apps	(Gls)
2010–2011	Santo André	16	(2)
2011	Sport	0	(0)
2012–2013	Ituano	31	(4)
2012	→ Ceará (loan)	8	(0)
2013–2015	América Mineiro	68	(6)
2015	→ Palmeiras (loan)	46	(6)
2016–2017	Palmeiras	61	(5)
2017–2019	Fiorentina	49	(1)
2019–2020	Palmeiras	27	(0)
2020–2023	Trabzonspor	79	(4)
2023–2026	Bahia	29	(1)
2024	→ Panathinaikos (loan)	8	(0)
2025	→ Atlético Mineiro (loan)	23	(3)
2026–	Atlético Mineiro	12	(0)
- * Club domestic league appearances and goals as of 7 April 2026

Vitor Hugo Franchescoli de Souza (born 20 May 1991), known as Vitor Hugo, is a Brazilian professional footballer who plays as a centre-back for Atlético Mineiro.

== Club career ==
Hugo scored his first goal for Fiorentina in a Serie A match against Benevento on 11 March 2018, the only goal of the game, dedicating it to his club's recently deceased captain Davide Astori by saluting a T-shirt bearing Astori's image.

On 5 October 2020, Hugo signed a four-year contract with Turkish club Trabzonspor.

On January 21, 2024, Hugo arrived in Athens for his new club Panathinaikos. His decision to move to Greece was influenced a lot by the presence of coach Fatih Terim.

== International career ==
He was called up for the Brazil national team in January 2017 for a friendly against Colombia, but remained an unused substitute.

== Career statistics ==
As of 15 December 2025

Appearances and goals by club, season and competition
Club	Season	League			National cup		Continental		State League		Other		Total	
Club	Season	Division	Apps	Goals	Apps	Goals	Apps	Goals	Apps	Goals	Apps	Goals	Apps	Goals
Santo André	2010	Série B	9	1	–		–		0	0	–		9	1
Santo André	2011	Série C	0	0	4	1	–		7	1	–		11	2
Santo André	Total		9	1	4	1	–		7	1	–		20	3
Sport	2011	Série B	0	0	–		–		–		–		0	0
Ituano	2012	–			–		–		13	1	–		13	1
Ituano	2013	–			–		–		18	3	–		18	3
Ituano	Total		–		–		–		31	4	–		31	4
Ceará (loan)	2012	Série B	8	0	–		–		–		–		8	0
América Mineiro	2013	Série B	33	2	4	0	–		0	0	–		37	2
América Mineiro	2014	Série B	35	4	1	0	–		0	0	–		36	4
América Mineiro	Total		68	6	5	0	–		0	0	–		73	6
Palmeiras (loan)	2015	Série A	30	4	10	2	–		16	2	–		56	8
Palmeiras	2016	Série A	35	4	2	0	6 (Note: Appearances in Copa Libertadores)	0	16	1	–		59	5
Palmeiras	2017	Série A	0	0	0	0	3	0	10	0	–		13	0
Palmeiras	Total		35	4	2	0	9	0	26	1	–		72	5
Fiorentina	2017–18	Serie A	19	1	2	0	–		–		–		21	1
Fiorentina	2018–19	Serie A	30	0	3	0	–		–		–		33	0
Fiorentina	Total		49	1	5	0	–		–		–		54	1
Palmeiras	2019	Série A	20	0	–		0	0	–		–		20	0
Palmeiras	2020	Série A	4	0	0	0	3	0	3	0	–		10	0
Palmeiras	Total		24	0	0	0	3	0	3	0	–		30	0
Trabzonspor	2020–21	Süper Lig	30	2	1	2	–		–		1 (Note: Appearance in Turkish Super Cup)	0	32	4
Trabzonspor	2021–22	Süper Lig	29	1	3	0	4 (Note: Appearances in UEFA Europa Conference League)	1	–		–		36	2
Trabzonspor	2022–23	Süper Lig	20	1	2	1	8 (Note: One appearance in UEFA Champions League, five appearances and one goal in UEFA Europa League, two appearances in UEFA Europa Conference League)	1	–		1	0	31	3
Trabzonspor	Total		79	4	6	3	12	2	–		2	0	99	9
Bahia	2023	Série A	27	1	2	0	–		–		–		29	1
Bahia	2024	Série A	1	0	0	0	–		–		–		1	0
Bahia	2025	Série A	–		–		–		1	0	0	0	1	0
Bahia	Total		28	1	2	0	0	0	1	0	0	0	31	1
Panathinaikos (loan)	2023–24	SLG	8	0	2	0	–		–		–		10	0
Atlético Mineiro (loan)	2025	Série A	23	3	2	0	9 (Note: Appearances in Copa Sudamericana)	1	–		–		34	4
Career total			361	24	38	6	33	3	84	8	2	0	518	41

== Honours ==
Palmeiras

- Campeonato Brasileiro Série A: 2016
- Copa do Brasil: 2015

Trabzonspor

- Süper Lig: 2021–22
- Turkish Super Cup: 2020, 2022

Panathinaikos

- Greek Cup: 2023–24

Individual

- Süper Lig Defender of the Season: 2020–21
