= Cleiton Xavier =

Brazilian footballer (born 1983)

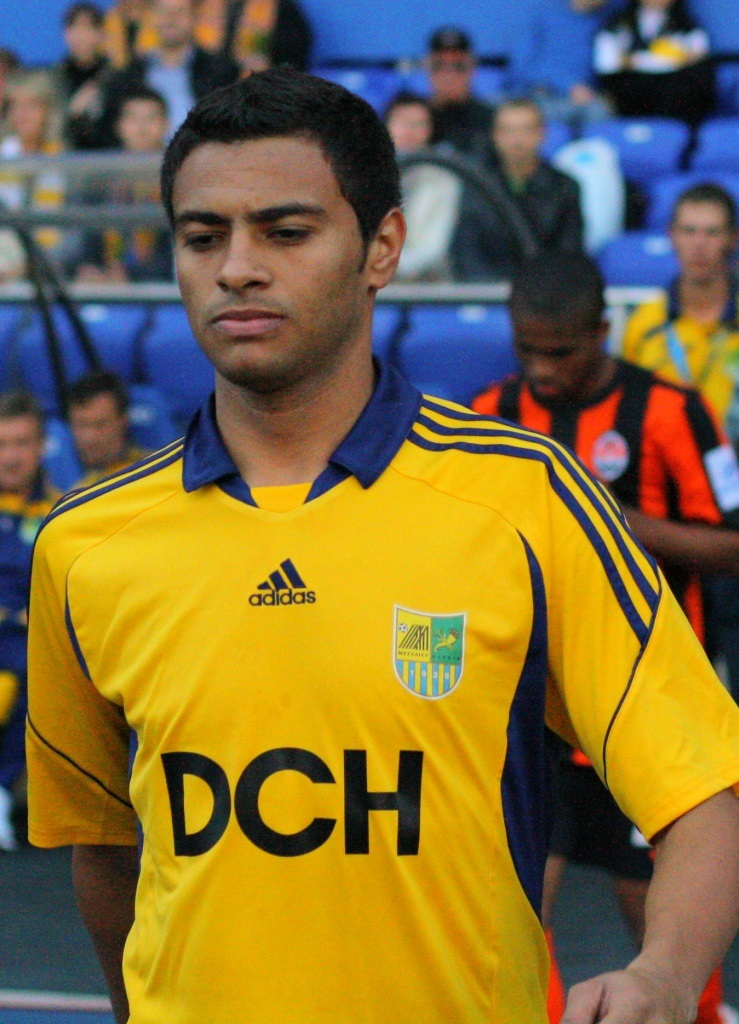
- Cleiton Xavier in 2010

Personal information
- Full name: Cleiton Ribeiro Xavier
- Date of birth: 23 March 1983 (age 43)
- Place of birth: São José da Tapera, Brazil
- Height: 1.78 m (5 ft 10 in)
- Position: Attacking midfielder

Youth career
- CSA

Senior career*
Years	Team	Apps	(Gls)
2001–2002	CSA	8	(2)
2002–2008	Internacional	68	(5)
2005	→ Sport Recife (loan)	4	(0)
2005	→ Brasiliense (loan)	5	(1)
2006	→ Gama (loan)	6	(0)
2006	→ Marília (loan)	2	(0)
2007–2008	→ Figueirense (loan)	61	(12)
2009–2010	Palmeiras	90	(16)
2010–2015	Metalist Kharkiv	109	(46)
2015–2016	Palmeiras	62	(5)
2017–2018	Vitória	42	(7)

International career
2003	Brazil U20	5	(0)
2009	Brazil	0	(0)
- * Club domestic league appearances and goals

Cleiton Ribeiro Xavier (Ukrainian: Клейтон Шав'єр; born 23 March 1983) is a Brazilian former professional footballer who played as an attacking midfielder. He is known by his powerful and accurate free kicks, dribbling skills and passes.

== Club career ==
In his early career, Cleiton Xavier played for CSA and Internacional, and was loaned out various times.

=== Palmeiras ===
In early 2009, Palmeiras signed Cleiton Xavier from the relegated Figueirense. Cleiton Xavier proved he had good talent in Palmeiras's first matches in the Libertadores Cup and in the São Paulo State Championship. On 29 April 2009, he scored an 87th minute away-goal against Colo-Colo in the Libertadores Cup that secured Palmeiras' progression to the knockout stages of the tournament, it was a very long-range shot inside the goalkeeper's left angle.

Later in the Série A alongside teammate Diego Souza, Cleiton Xavier made an outstanding season with Palmeiras, leading the competition for 19 rounds, however Palmeiras finished 5th due to losses in the final matches and did not qualify for the Libertadores Cup. Cleiton Xavier was elected the 3rd best player of the season, even though he had an injury.

In 2010, Cleiton Xavier remained with Palmeiras and also started well the year. He participated in Palmeiras's first ten goals in the São Paulo State Championship.

=== Metalist Kharkiv ===
On 14 July 2010, Cleiton Xavier transferred to Metalist Kharkiv for €4.5 million. In 2013, he became popular for scoring a fastest equalizing goal from the starting line after the restart of the match against local league rival, Chornomorets. He then inspired them to a 3 – 1 victory which boosted their chances to qualify for next season Champions League campaign in which the victory lift them above another local rival who competing for the same spot, Dynamo Kyiv.

== Career statistics ==
As of 28 January 2017

Appearances and goals by club, season and competition
Club	Season	League		Cup		Continental		State League		Total	
Club	Season	Apps	Goals	Apps	Goals	Apps	Goals	Apps	Goals	Apps	Goals
Internacional	2002	20	3	0	0	—		0	0	20	3
Internacional	2003	25	1	0	0	—		0	0	25	1
Internacional	2004	23	1	0	0	—		0	0	23	1
Internacional	Total	68	5	0	0	0	0	0	0	68	5
Brasiliense (loan)	2005	1	0	0	0	—		0	0	1	0
Figueirense (loan)	2007	28	0	0	0	—		0	0	28	0
Figueirense (loan)	2008	33	12	0	0	—		0	0	33	12
Figueirense (loan)	Total	61	12	0	0	0	0	0	0	61	12
Palmeiras	2009	32	3	—		12	3	17	3	61	9
Palmeiras	2010	7	1	4	1	0	0	16	5	27	7
Palmeiras	Total	39	4	4	1	12	3	33	8	88	16
Metalist Kharkiv	2010–11	26	6	—		9	3	—		35	9
Metalist Kharkiv	2011–12	25	10	—		12	2	—		37	12
Metalist Kharkiv	2012–13	29	15	—		9	5	—		38	20
Metalist Kharkiv	2013–14	20	7	1	0	0	0	—		21	7
Metalist Kharkiv	2014–15	9	8	2	2	5	1	—		16	11
Metalist Kharkiv	Total	109	46	3	2	35	11	—		147	59
Palmeiras	2015	10	0	3	1	—		4	0	17	1
Vitória	2017	0	0	0	0	—		0	0	0	0
Career total		267	53	7	2	42	13	37	8	353	76

== Honours ==
Internacional

- Rio Grande do Sul State League: 2003, 2004

Figueirense

- Santa Catarina State League: 2008

Palmeiras

- Copa do Brasil: 2015
- Campeonato Brasileiro: 2016

Vitória

- Campeonato Baiano: 2017
