= Jackson (footballer, born 1 May 1990) =

Brazilian footballer

Personal information
- Full name: Jackson de Souza
- Date of birth: 1 May 1990 (age 36)
- Place of birth: Cuiabá, Brazil
- Height: 1.86 m (6 ft 1 in)
- Position: Centre back

Team information
- Current team: Amazonas
- Number: 3

Youth career
- 2008–2010: São Paulo

Senior career*
Years	Team	Apps	(Gls)
2010–2011	São Paulo	0	(0)
2011	→ Ituano (loan)	16	(0)
2011	Criciúma	5	(0)
2012–2016	Internacional	25	(2)
2014	→ Náutico (loan)	0	(0)
2014	→ Goiás (loan)	41	(4)
2015	→ Palmeiras (loan)	24	(3)
2016–2019	Bahia	44	(2)
2019	→ Fortaleza (loan)	11	(0)
2020–2021	Fortaleza	39	(0)
2022	Sabah	16	(2)
2023	Amazonas	19	(2)
2024–2025	Ferroviária	32	(2)
2025–	Amazonas	19	(2)
- * Club domestic league appearances and goals as of 22 October 2023

Jackson de Souza (born 1 May 1990), simply known as Jackson, is a Brazilian professional footballer who plays as a central defender for Amazonas in Campeonato Brasileiro Série B.

== Early life ==
Jackson was born in Cuiabá. He played youth football for São Paulo.

== Career ==
Jackson made his debut for Ituano on 16 January 2011.

Jackson made his debut for Criciuma on 3 August 2011.

Jackson made his debut for Internacional on 14 September 2012. He scored his first goal for the club against Clube Atlético Mineiro, scoring in the 66th minute.

Jackson made his debut for Goias on 10 February 2014. He scored his first goal for the club on 25 May 2014, scoring in the 5th minute.

Jackson made his debut for Palmeiras on 31 May 2015. He scored his first goal for the club against Flamengo on 16 August 2015, scoring in the 6th minute.

Jackson made his debut for Bahia on 15 May 2016. He scored his first goal for the club on 3 September 2016.

Jackson made his debut for Fortaleza on 25 August 2019.

Jackson made his debut for Sabah on 4 March 2022. He scored his first goal for the club on 9 March 2022, scoring in the 16th minute.

Jackson made his debut for Amazonas on 14 May 2023. He scored his first goal for the club on 21 May 2023.

== Honours ==
São Paulo

- Copa São Paulo de Futebol Jr.: 2010

Palmeiras

- Copa do Brasil: 2015

Bahia

- Copa do Nordeste: 2017
- Campeonato Baiano: 2018, 2019

Fortaleza

- Campeonato Cearense: 2020, 2021
