= Gabriel (footballer, born July 1992) =

Brazilian footballer

- Gabriel with RedBull Bragantino in 2026

Personal information
- Full name: Gabriel Girotto Franco
- Date of birth: 11 July 1992 (age 34)
- Place of birth: Campinas, Brazil
- Height: 1.72 m (5 ft 7 1/2 in)
- Position: Defensive midfielder

Team information
- Current team: Red Bull Bragantino
- Number: 6

Youth career
- 2006–2011: Paulínia
- 2011–2012: Botafogo

Senior career*
Years	Team	Apps	(Gls)
2011	Paulínia	1	(0)
2012–2014	Botafogo	123	(2)
2015–2016	Monte Azul	0	(0)
2015–2016	→ Palmeiras (loan)	59	(3)
2017–2022	Corinthians	238	(8)
2022–2024	Internacional	50	(0)
2024	→ Athletico Paranaense (loan)	20	(0)
2025–	Red Bull Bragantino	57	(2)
- * Club domestic league appearances and goals as of 7 April 2026

Gabriel Girotto Franco (born 11 July 1992 in Campinas), simply known as Gabriel, is a Brazilian and Italian footballer who plays as a defensive midfielder. He currently plays for Red Bull Bragantino.

== Club career ==
=== Botafogo ===
Gabriel began his career at Paulínia in 2010, where he competed in the São Paulo State Championship Second Division in 2010 and the A3 Series in 2011. He competed for the São Paulo club in the 2011 São Paulo Junior Football Cup, in a group that also included Botafogo. His performance caught the attention of the Rio club, to which he transferred in the same year, playing from the youth categories.

In 2012, Gabriel, showing his potential in the youth categories, was promoted to the main team of the Rio team by coach Oswaldo de Oliveira. Over time, Gabriel stood out in the squad, earning a starting position in the Botafogo squad.

He was the undefeated champion of the Rio Championship in 2013 in both rounds.

At 22 years old, the player, who played 35 out of 38 games, finished the Brazilian Championship as the third place in the tackles category: he did it 131 times.

Gabriel was called up for the Brazilian national team in 2013 by coach Alexandre Galo, but was not released by coach Oswaldo de Oliveira, claiming that the defensive midfielder, then a starter, was very important for the sequence of 6 games of Botafogo, leader of the Brazilian championship at the time.

On 15 December 2014 Gabriel terminated his contract with the Rio club.

=== Palmeiras ===
On 26 December 2014 Gabriel was announced as a player for Palmeiras on a two-year loan with the option to buy by the São Paulo team. After having terminated his contract with Botafogo, he was linked to Monte Azul, a team from the A2 Series of the Paulistão, thus being passed on loan to the green and white club. The player was also sought after by Cruzeiro, the Brazilian champion of 2014.

On 31 January 2015 he made his debut for Palmeiras, in a victory over Audax by 3 to 1, in a match valid for the 2015 São Paulo Championship.

In the first half of 2015, the defensive midfielder maintained a good phase. In addition to having been the player with the most duels (21 matches after the end of the state tournament), Gabriel was elected the best defensive midfielder of the Paulista.

In the middle of the year, when he won a song and the nickname "Pitbull" from the fans, the athlete seriously injured his left knee in a match valid for the 2015 Brazilian Championship, against Atlético Paranaense and was out for the rest of the season.

The player was champion of the Brazil Cup with Palmeiras in the year 2015.

The player was champion of the Brazilian Championship with Palmeiras in the year 2016. Elected crowd's favorite and best in his position in the championship.

On 5 January 2017, in mutual agreement with Palmeiras, the contract was not renewed.

=== Corinthians ===
On 13 January 2017 Gabriel was announced as a new reinforcement for Corinthians for four seasons.

He debuted with the Corinthians shirt on 18 January in the semifinal against Vasco da Gama, for the 2017 Florida Cup tournament.

On 22 February 2017, in the classic against Palmeiras, Gabriel, who already had a yellow card, was unjustly expelled by referee Thiago Duarte Peixoto who thought that the defensive midfielder had pulled Keno in a counterattack by Palmeiras, but who did that was Maycon.

Even with one less player, Corinthians managed to leave the field with the victory, counting on a goal from Jô, at 42 minutes of the second half. On 6 March Gabriel had his expulsion annulled by the TJD.

He scored his first goal with the black and white shirt in the 2–0 victory over Luverdense, in a match valid for the 2017 Brazil Cup.

On 7 May he won his first title with the Corinthians shirt, the 2017 São Paulo Championship.

On 15 November 2017, after a 3–1 victory over Fluminense, he won the Brazilian Championship. Gabriel was elected the best defensive midfielder of the competition by the Mesa Redonda Trophy.

On 8 April 2018, after a victory over Palmeiras, by 1–0 in normal time, and 4–3 on penalties, he won the São Paulo championship for the second time with Corinthians.

He reached the mark of 100 games with the black and white shirt, in the friendly against Grêmio, on 8 July 2018, and declared himself to Corinthians by reading a letter to the Fiel.

For his highlight in the season, he received a proposal from Al-Hilal. The player even said goodbye to the São Paulo club, but had his contract breached by the Arab club upon arrival in Dubai, returning to Corinthians.

On 2 May 2021 he reached the mark of 200 games with the Corinthians shirt, in a 2–2 draw against São Paulo, for the 2021 São Paulo Championship.

For Corinthians, he scored a goal against all rivals from São Paulo, the last one against Santos in November 2021.

On 4 February 2022 the player said goodbye to his club teammates and on 10 February he said goodbye to the club on his social networks. There were 238 games and 8 goals with the shirt of the São Paulo club.

Gabriel leaves Corinthians being the leader in tackles of the Brasileirão.

=== Internacional ===
On 4 February 2022 Internacional confirmed his signing, being officially announced on 10 February with a two-year contract. He was introduced on 11 February.

In August 2022, Gabriel became the leader in tackles in the Serie A of the Brazilian Championship for Internacional.

In 2022, even with an injury in the middle of the championship, he was the second highest tackler in the Brasileirão.

He played as captain for the first time in the 3–1 victory against Flamengo and assumed the position of captain throughout several games, becoming a key piece in the squad and trust of coach Mano Menezes.

The fans adopted the nickname "RUF RUF" in allusion to the pitbull dog, in a great phase of the player as captain of the team in 2022.

In March 2023, he launched a line of school supplies, called "RUF RUF" for a social project. The materials were distributed to low-income students from public schools in the Capital Gaúcha.

On 4 May 2023, after an injury, he embarked for Qatar to undergo treatment at the Aspetar hospital, which is a reference in recovery.

On 16 October 2023 his contract was renewed with Internacional until December 2025.

=== Athletico Paranaense ===
On 19 April 2024 Athletico Paranaense officially signed the player on loan until the end of 2024, at the request of the coach Cuca.

During his loan spell at Athletico Paranaense, Gabriel led the 2024 Campeonato Brasileiro Série A in average accurate passes per game, with 39.4 per match at 90% accuracy. He also scored one goal and provided three assists during the loan.

=== Return to Internacional ===
Internacional coach Roger Machado requested Gabriel's reintegration into the squad following the end of his loan. However, after returning from the loan, Internacional announced the early termination of Gabriel's contract in January 2025, even though his deal ran through the end of that year.

=== Red Bull Bragantino ===
On 15 January 2025, Red Bull Bragantino announced the signing of Gabriel, on a contract until the end of 2025. The experienced, multiple-title-winning midfielder was presented as a significant addition ahead of the club's state and national competitions.

In the 2025 Campeonato Paulista, Gabriel was one of the competition's standout performers. According to Sofascore data, he ranked as the 9th-best tackler in the tournament and 1st among Red Bull Bragantino players, while also posting an average match rating of 7.04, the ninth-highest on the squad.

In an interview with ge.globo, Gabriel said he hoped to help end the club's trophy drought — its last title having come in the 2019 Campeonato Brasileiro Série B — and that he wanted to pass on to younger teammates the importance of treating football with seriousness, comparing it to "a plate of food," something essential to life. At that point, he had made 493 appearances in his professional career and was recognized for his leadership and commitment on the pitch.

=== Personal life ===
Beyond football, Gabriel has pursued interests in entrepreneurship and fashion, describing himself as involved in international business ventures and social impact projects. In July 2026, he was featured in Galore magazine, where he discussed his career, his admiration for Ronaldo Nazário, Neymar, and Ronaldinho, and his growing involvement in the fashion industry.

== Honours ==
Corinthians

- Campeonato Brasileiro Série A: 2017
- Campeonato Paulista: 2017, 2018, 2019

Palmeiras

- Campeonato Brasileiro Série A: 2016
- Copa do Brasil: 2015

Botafogo-RJ

- Campeonato Carioca: 2013

=== Individual ===
- Campeonato Paulista Team of the Year: 2015
- Best Defensive Midfielder in Brazil: 2017
