= Amaral (footballer, born 1986) =

Brazilian footballer

Personal information
- Full name: William José de Souza
- Date of birth: 7 October 1986 (age 40)
- Place of birth: Goiânia, Brazil
- Height: 1.82 m (6 ft 0 in)
- Position: Defensive midfielder

Youth career
- 2005: Goiás

Senior career*
Years	Team	Apps	(Gls)
2006–2014	Goiás	214	(21)
2015–2017	Palmeiras	15	(0)
2016	→ Coritiba (loan)	8	(2)
2017	→ Chapecoense (loan)	9	(0)
2018–2019	Chapecoense	25	(0)
- * Club domestic league appearances and goals

William José de Souza (born 7 October 1986), commonly known as Amaral, is a Brazilian former footballer who played as a defensive midfielder.

He made his professional debut for Goiás in a 3–1 home win over Fluminense in the Campeonato Brasileiro on 30 August 2006 and scored his first professional goal for Goiás in a 3–1 home win over Palmeiras in the Campeonato Brasileiro on 17 June 2007.

== Honours ==
Goiás

- Campeonato Goiano: 2006, 2009, 2012, 2013
- Campeonato Brasileiro Série B: 2012

Palmeiras

- Copa do Brasil: 2015

Chapecoense

- Campeonato Catarinense: 2017
