= Mário Sérgio (footballer, born 1992) =

Brazilian footballer

Personal information
- Full name: Mário Sérgio Gomes de Souza
- Date of birth: 19 January 1992 (age 34)
- Place of birth: Baixa Grande, Brazil
- Height: 1.74 m (5 ft 9 in)
- Position: Right-back

Team information
- Current team: Penapolense

Youth career
- 2009: Vitória

Senior career*
Years	Team	Apps	(Gls)
2011	Palmeirinha		
2012	Pirassununguense		
2013	Ferroviária	0	(0)
2014–2015	Atlético-PR	15	(0)
2015–2016	Joinville	19	(1)
2016	Monte Azul	0	(0)
2016	→ Santa Cruz (loan)	0	(0)
2017	Mirassol	0	(0)
2017–2018	SC Alvarenga	9	(0)
2018	XV de Novembro		
2019–	Penapolense		
- * Club domestic league appearances and goals

Mário Sérgio Gomes de Souza (born 19 January 1992), known as Mário Sérgio, is a Brazilian professional footballer who plays for Penapolense as a right-back.
