= Victor Ramos (footballer, born 1989) =

Brazilian footballer

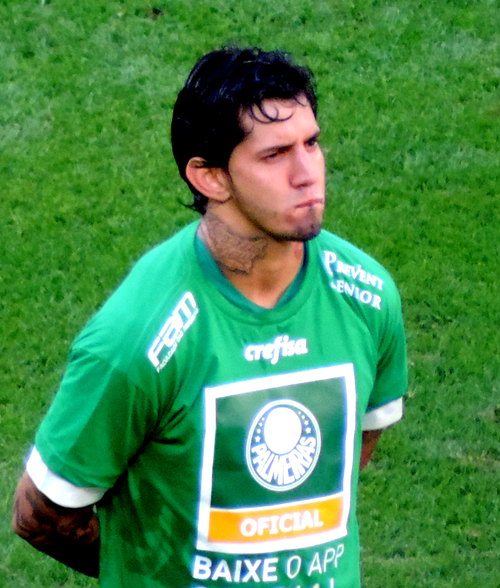
- Victor Ramos with Palmeiras in 2015

Personal information
- Full name: Victor Ramos Ferreira
- Date of birth: 5 May 1989 (age 37)
- Place of birth: Salvador, Brazil
- Height: 1.92 m (6 ft 3 1/2 in)
- Position: Centre back

Youth career
- 1999–2008: Vitória

Senior career*
Years	Team	Apps	(Gls)
2008–2009	Vitória	29	(2)
2009–2012	Standard Liège	33	(0)
2011	→ Vasco da Gama (loan)	7	(0)
2012–2013	→ Vitória (loan)	98	(6)
2014–2016	Monterrey	31	(1)
2015	→ Palmeiras (loan)	27	(3)
2016	→ Vitoria (loan)	38	(2)
2017	Chapecoense	15	(1)
2018	Goiás	19	(1)
2019	Guarani	4	(0)
2019	Vitória	7	(0)
2019	CRB	24	(1)
2021	Botafogo-SP	10	(0)
2021	CRB	0	(0)
2022	Chapecoense	29	(1)
2023	Portuguesa	7	(0)
2023	Chapecoense	10	(0)
- * Club domestic league appearances and goals as of 29 May 2023

Victor Ramos Ferreira (born 5 May 1989) is a Brazilian footballer who plays as a central defender.

== Club career ==
Victor Ramos was born in Salvador, Bahia. He joined Vitória's youth setup in 1999, aged ten, and was promoted to the main squad in 2008.

Victor Ramos made his professional – and Série A – debut on 16 November 2008, playing the full 90 minutes in a 1–2 away loss against Atlético Paranaense. Mainly a second-choice, he only established himself as a starter after the arrival of new manager Paulo César Carpegiani.

Victor Ramos scored his first goal in the main category of Brazilian football on 12 July 2009, netting the fourth in a 6–2 home routing of Santos. He finished the campaign with 17 appearances, being a regular starter.

On 31 August 2009, Victor Ramos moved abroad and joined Belgian Pro League side Standard Liège, for a rumoured €1 million fee. He only made his debut for the club on 4 November, coming on as a half-time substitute for Mohamed Sarr in a 2–0 UEFA Champions League home win against Olympiacos.

On 20 July 2011, after being demoted to Standard's reserve team back in January, Victor Ramos was loaned to Vasco da Gama until the end of the year. However, he failed to impress and acted mainly as a backup to his former Vitória teammate Anderson Martins.

On 31 January 2012 Victor Ramos returned to Vitória, in a season-long loan deal. He was an undisputed starter for the side during the year, appearing in 33 league matches and scoring a career-best five goals as his side returned to the top tier.

On 17 December 2013 Victor Ramos moved to Liga MX side C.F. Monterrey, signing a two-year deal. In July of the following year he was announced at Vitória on loan, but the move was later declared void by his parent club.

On 12 January 2015 Victor Ramos was loaned to Palmeiras, for one year. After being sparingly used, he left the club and served a subsequent loan stint at Vitória before rescinding his contract with his parent club.

On 6 April 2017, Victor Ramos signed for Chapecoense. He left the club in October 2017.

On 20 December 2017, Victor Ramos joined China League One side Meizhou Meixian Techand, becoming the first foreign player in club's history. However, he had his contract terminated by mutual consent on 18 January 2018.

After four games and two months with Guarani, Victor Ramos moved to Vitória in March 2019. In May, he joined CRB.

On 18 February 2021, Victor Ramos was presented at Botafogo-SP. On 22 June, he returned to CRB, but failed to appear in a single match for the latter, mainly due to injury.

On 8 March 2022, Victor Ramos was announced at his former club Chapecoense. On 1 December, he signed for Portuguesa, but left the club on a mutual agreement the following 9 February.

== Career statistics ==
As of 9 February 2023

Club	Season	League			State League		Cup		Continental		Other		Total	
Club	Season	Division	Apps	Goals	Apps	Goals	Apps	Goals	Apps	Goals	Apps	Goals	Apps	Goals
Vitória	2008	Série A	1	0	—		—		—		—		1	0
Vitória	2009	Série A	16	1	7	0	4	1	—		—		27	2
Vitória	Subtotal		17	1	7	0	4	1	0	0	0	0	28	2
Standard Liège	2009–10	Belgian Pro League	13	0	—		—		7 (Note: One appearance in UEFA Champions League, six appearances in UEFA Europa League)	0	—		18	0
Standard Liège	2010–11	Belgian Pro League	12	0	—		2	0	—		—		14	0
Standard Liège	Subtotal		25	0	—		2	0	7	0	0	0	34	0
Vasco	2011	Série A	6	0	—		—		2 (Note: Appearance(s) in Copa Sudamericana)	0	—		8	0
Vitória	2012	Série B	33	5	12	1	7	0	—		—		52	6
Vitória	2013	Série A	33	0	8	0	3	0	2	0	—		44	0
Vitória	Subtotal		66	5	20	1	10	0	2	0	0	0	96	6
Monterrey	2013–14	Liga MX	14	1	—		3	0	—		—		17	1
Monterrey	2014–15	Liga MX	10	0	—		5	0	—		—		15	0
Monterrey	Subtotal		24	1	—		8	0	0	0	0	0	32	1
Palmeiras	2015	Série A	17	2	8	1	2	0	—		—		27	3
Vitória	2016	Série A	25	1	5	1	6	0	2	0	—		38	2
Chapecoense	2017	Série A	12	1	0	0	0	0	—		—		12	1
Goiás	2018	Série B	19	1	0	0	0	0	—		—		19	1
Guarani	2019	Série B	0	0	4	0	0	0	—		—		4	0
Vitória	2019	Série B	3	0	1	0	—		—		3 (Note: Appearance(s) in Copa do Nordeste)	0	7	0
CRB	2019	Série B	24	1	—		—		—		—		24	1
Botafogo-SP	2021	Série B	0	0	10	0	—		—		—		10	0
CRB	2021	Série B	0	0	—		0	0	—		—		0	0
Chapecoense	2022	Série B	29	1	0	0	0	0	—		—		29	1
Portuguesa	2023	Paulista	—		7	0	—		—		—		7	0
Career total			250	14	62	3	32	1	13	0	3	0	360	18

== Honours ==
Vitória

- Campeonato Baiano: 2009, 2013

Standard Liège

- Belgian Cup: 2010–11

Palmeiras

- Copa do Brasil: 2015

Chapecoense

- Campeonato Catarinense: 2017
