= Lucas Marques (footballer, born 1988) =

Brazilian footballer

Personal information
- Full name: Lucas Rios Marques
- Date of birth: 26 March 1988 (age 38)
- Place of birth: Passos, Brazil
- Height: 1.74 m (5 ft 9 in)
- Position: Right back

Youth career
- 2003–2007: Figueirense

Senior career*
Years	Team	Apps	(Gls)
2007–2010	Figueirense	69	(9)
2008	→ São Bento (loan)	19	(4)
2011–2014	Botafogo	62	(3)
2015–2019	Palmeiras	28	(2)
2016	→ Cruzeiro (loan)	21	(0)
2017	→ Fluminense (loan)	56	(3)
2018	→ Vitória (loan)	21	(1)
2019	→ Botafogo-SP (loan)	21	(0)
2020	Figueirense	18	(0)

International career^{‡}
2009–2010	Brazil U20	7	(0)
2012–	Brazil	2	(0)
- * Club domestic league appearances and goals as of 12:56, 14 June 2019 (UTC) ‡ National team caps and goals as of 22 November 2012

Lucas Rios Marques (born 26 March 1988), sometimes known as just Lucas, is a Brazilian former footballer who played as a right back.

== Career ==
Born in Passos, Minas Gerais, Lucas Marques made his professional debut for Figueirense against Palmeiras in a 1–2 away defeat on 20 May 2007 in Campeonato Brasiliense. On 29 December 2010, he signed a five-year contract with Botafogo.

On 20 September 2012, Lucas Marques debut for Seleção in the victory against Argentines for 2–1, at Estádio Serra Dourada, in Goiânia, by Superclásico de las Américas.

=== Palmeiras ===
On 16 December 2014, the right-back signed a three-year contract with Palmeiras.

In March 2019, he joined Botafogo-SP on loan.

Games for Brazilian team

	Date	Place	Result	Opponent	Goals	Competition
1.	19 September 2012	Estádio Serra Dourada, Goiânia, Brazil	2–1	Argentina	0	Superclásico de las Américas
2.	21 November 2012	La Bombonera, Buenos Aires, Argentina	1(4)–2(3)	Argentina	0	Superclásico de las Américas

== Honours ==
=== Club ===
Botafogo

- Campeonato Carioca: 2013
- Taça Rio: 2012, 2013
- Taça Guanabara: 2013

Palmeiras

- Copa do Brasil: 2015

Fluminense

- Taça Guanabara: 2017

=== Brazil ===
- Superclásico de las Américas: 2012

=== Individual ===
- Best Right-back in Brazil: 2015
- Campeonato Carioca Team of the Year: 2017
