= 2015 Copa do Brasil finals =

2015 Copa do Brasil Finals
- Event: 2015 Copa do Brasil
Santos	Palmeiras
2	2
- on aggregate Palmeiras won 4–3 on penalties

First leg
Santos	Palmeiras
1	0
- Date: 25 November 2015
- Venue: Vila Belmiro, Santos
- Referee: Luiz Flávio de Oliveira (São Paulo) (replaced by Marcelo Aparecido de Souza (SP) in the 67th minute)
- Attendance: 14,116

Second leg
Palmeiras	Santos
2	1
- Date: 2 December 2015
- Venue: Allianz Parque, São Paulo
- Referee: Héber Roberto Lopes (Santa Catarina)
- Attendance: 39,660

The 2015 Copa do Brasil Finals were the two-legged final that decided the winner of the 2015 Copa do Brasil, the 27th edition of the Copa do Brasil, Brazil's national cup football tournament organized by CBF.

The finals were contested in two-legged home-and-away format between Santos and Palmeiras, two of the most successful clubs of Brazil. Following a draw to determine the home and away teams for both legs, Santos hosted the first match at Vila Belmiro in Santos on 25 November 2015, while the second match was hosted by Palmeiras at Allianz Parque in São Paulo on 2 December 2015.

Santos won the first leg by 1–0, and Palmeiras won the second leg by 2–1. As the tournament does not include extra time for any match in case of a tied aggregate score, nor even the away goals rule for the finals, the second match went straight to the penalty shoot-out, which Palmeiras won by 4–3 to claim their 3rd Copa do Brasil title.

This was the first Copa do Brasil win for manager Marcelo Oliveira, having reached the finals four times as he was runners-up in 2011, 2012 and 2014. The title was also Palmeiras' first playing in Allianz Parque, inaugurated in November 2014.

As winners, Palmeiras qualified automatically to group stage of the 2016 Copa Libertadores de América.

== Qualified teams ==
Team	Previous finals appearances (bold indicates winners)
(São Paulo (state)) Santos	1 (**2010**)
(São Paulo (state)) Palmeiras	3 (1996, **1998**, **2012**)

== Road to the finals ==
Note: In all results below, the score of the finalist is given first (H: home; A: away).

(São Paulo (state)) Santos				Round	(São Paulo (state)) Palmeiras			
Opponent	Agg.	1st leg	2nd leg		Opponent	Agg.	1st leg	2nd leg
(Paraná (state)) Londrina	2–0	1–0 (A)	1–0 (H)	First Round	(Bahia) Vitória da Conquista	4–1	4–1 (A)	—
(Paraná (state)) Maringá	3–2	2–2 (A)	1–0 (H)	Second Round	(Maranhão) Sampaio Corrêa	6–2	1–1 (A)	5–1 (H)
(Pernambuco) Sport Recife	4–3	1–2 (A)	3–1 (H)	Third Round	(Alagoas) ASA	1–0	0–0 (H)	1–0 (A)
(São Paulo (state)) Corinthians	4–1	2–0 (H)	2–1 (A)	Round of 16	(Minas Gerais) Cruzeiro	5–3	2–1 (H)	3–2 (A)
(Santa Catarina (state)) Figueirense	4–2	1–0 (A)	3–2 (H)	Quarter-finals	(Rio Grande do Sul) Internacional	4–3	1–1 (A)	3–2 (H)
(São Paulo (state)) São Paulo	6–2	3–1 (A)	3–1 (H)	Semi-finals	(Rio de Janeiro (state)) Fluminense	3–3 (4–1 p)	1–2 (A)	2–1 (H)

== Match details ==
=== First leg ===
25 November 2015
22:00 (DST: UTC−02:00)

Santos (São Paulo (state))	1–0	(São Paulo (state)) Palmeiras
Gabriel 78'	Report

Vila Belmiro, Santos
Attendance: 14,116
Referee: Luiz Flávio de Oliveira (São Paulo)
(replaced by Marcelo Aparecido de Souza (SP) in the 67th minute)

**Santos**	**Palmeiras**

GK	1	(Brazil) Vanderlei
RB	4	(Brazil) Victor Ferraz	(yellow card) 83'
CB	14	(Brazil) David Braz
CB	6	(Brazil) Gustavo Henrique
LB	37	(Brazil) Zeca
DM	29	(Brazil) Thiago Maia		(substituted off) 90+2'
DM	8	(Brazil) Renato (c)	(yellow card) 59'
AM	20	(Brazil) Lucas Lima
RW	31	(Brazil) Marquinhos Gabriel		(substituted off) 64'
LW	10	(Brazil) Gabriel	(yellow card) 79'	(substituted off) 83'
CF	9	(Brazil) Ricardo Oliveira	(yellow card) 63'
Substitutes:
GK	12	(Brazil) Vladimir
DF	2	(Brazil) Werley
DF	23	(Brazil) Chiquinho
DF	32	(Brazil) Paulo Ricardo
DF	38	(Brazil) Daniel Guedes
MF	5	(Brazil) Alison
MF	17	(Brazil) Rafael Longuine
MF	19	(Brazil) Marquinhos
MF	27	(Brazil) Léo Cittadini
FW	11	(Brazil) Geuvânio		(substituted in) 64'
FW	39	(Brazil) Nilson		(substituted in) 90+2'
FW	40	(Brazil) Neto Berola		(substituted in) 83'
Manager:
(Brazil) Dorival Júnior

GK	1	(Brazil) Fernando Prass	(yellow card) 31'
RB	32	(Brazil) Lucas	(yellow card) 69'	(red card) 87'
CB	26	(Brazil) Jackson
CB	31	(Brazil) Vitor Hugo
LB	11	(Brazil) Zé Roberto (c)
DM	36	(Brazil) Matheus Sales	(yellow card) 37'	(substituted off) 45'
DM	5	(Brazil) Arouca	(yellow card) 63'
AM	27	(Brazil) Robinho
RW	7	(Brazil) Dudu	(yellow card) 90'
LW	33	(Brazil) Gabriel Jesus		(substituted off) 12'
CF	8	(Paraguay) Lucas Barrios	(yellow card) 42'	(substituted off) 64'
Substitutes:
GK	47	(Brazil) Fábio
DF	4	(Brazil) Nathan
DF	22	(Brazil) João Pedro
DF	66	(Brazil) Egídio
MF	15	(Brazil) Amaral		(substituted in) 45'
MF	20	(Argentina) Agustín Allione
MF	28	(Brazil) Andrei Girotto
MF	30	(Brazil) Fellype Gabriel
FW	9	(Argentina) Jonatan Cristaldo
FW	19	(Brazil) Rafael Marques		(substituted in) 64'
FW	29	(Brazil) Kelvin		(substituted in) 12'
Manager:
(Brazil) Marcelo Oliveira

Assistant referees:
Emerson Augusto de Carvalho (São Paulo)
Marcelo Carvalho van Gasse (São Paulo)
Fourth official:
Marcelo Aparecido de Souza (São Paulo)

=== Second leg ===
2 December 2015
22:00 (DST: UTC−02:00)

Palmeiras (São Paulo (state))	2–1	(São Paulo (state)) Santos
Dudu 56', 84'	Report	Ricardo Oliveira 86'
Penalties
Zé Roberto (penalty scored); Rafael Marques (penalty missed); Jackson (penalty scored); Cristaldo (penalty scored); Fernando Prass (penalty scored)	4–3	(penalty missed) Marquinhos Gabriel; (penalty missed) Gustavo Henrique; (penalty scored) Geuvânio; (penalty scored) Lucas Lima; (penalty scored) Ricardo Oliveira

Allianz Parque, São Paulo
Attendance: 39,660
Referee: Héber Roberto Lopes (Santa Catarina)

**Palmeiras**	**Santos**

GK	1	(Brazil) Fernando Prass
RB	22	(Brazil) João Pedro	(yellow card) 66'	(substituted off) 71'
CB	26	(Brazil) Jackson
CB	31	(Brazil) Vitor Hugo
LB	11	(Brazil) Zé Roberto (c)
DM	36	(Brazil) Matheus Sales	(yellow card) 50'
DM	5	(Brazil) Arouca
AM	27	(Brazil) Robinho
RW	33	(Brazil) Gabriel Jesus		(substituted off) 40'
LW	7	(Brazil) Dudu	(yellow card) 90'
CF	8	(Paraguay) Lucas Barrios		(substituted off) 71'
Substitutes:
GK	47	(Brazil) Fábio
DF	4	(Brazil) Nathan
DF	42	(Brazil) Lucas Taylor		(substituted in) 71'
DF	66	(Brazil) Egídio
MF	10	(Brazil) Cleiton Xavier
MF	15	(Brazil) Amaral
MF	20	(Argentina) Agustín Allione
MF	28	(Brazil) Andrei Girotto
FW	9	(Argentina) Jonatan Cristaldo		(substituted in) 71'
FW	14	(Argentina) Pablo Mouche
FW	19	(Brazil) Rafael Marques		(substituted in) 40'
Manager:
(Brazil) Marcelo Oliveira

GK	1	(Brazil) Vanderlei
RB	4	(Brazil) Victor Ferraz
CB	14	(Brazil) David Braz		(substituted off) 28'
CB	6	(Brazil) Gustavo Henrique
LB	37	(Brazil) Zeca
DM	29	(Brazil) Thiago Maia		(substituted off) 80'
DM	8	(Brazil) Renato (c)
AM	20	(Brazil) Lucas Lima
RW	10	(Brazil) Gabriel	(yellow card) 48'	(substituted off) 63'
LW	31	(Brazil) Marquinhos Gabriel
CF	9	(Brazil) Ricardo Oliveira
Substitutes:
GK	12	(Brazil) Vladimir
DF	2	(Brazil) Werley		(substituted in) 28'
DF	23	(Brazil) Chiquinho
DF	32	(Brazil) Paulo Ricardo		(substituted in) 80'
DF	38	(Brazil) Daniel Guedes
MF	5	(Brazil) Alison
MF	18	(Brazil) Vitor Bueno
MF	21	(Brazil) Leandrinho
MF	41	(Brazil) Serginho
FW	11	(Brazil) Geuvânio		(substituted in) 63'
FW	39	(Brazil) Nilson
FW	40	(Brazil) Neto Berola
Manager:
(Brazil) Dorival Júnior

Assistant referees:
Emerson Augusto de Carvalho (São Paulo)
Marcelo Carvalho van Gasse (São Paulo)

== See also ==
- 2015 Campeonato Brasileiro Série A
