= 2015 Copa do Brasil Second Round =

The 2015 Copa do Brasil Second Round was played from 22 April to 20 May 2015, to decide the 20 teams advancing to the Third Round.

== Second round ==
Team 1	Agg.	Team 2	1st leg	2nd leg
Palmeiras (São Paulo (state))	6–2	(Maranhão) Sampaio Corrêa	1–1	5–1
Vitória (Bahia)	3–3 (a)	(Alagoas) ASA	1–1	2–2
Botafogo (Rio de Janeiro (state))	5–1	(São Paulo (state)) Capivariano	2–1	3–0
Figueirense (Santa Catarina (state))	2–1	(Santa Catarina (state)) Avaí	0–1	2–0
Santos (São Paulo (state))	3–2	(Paraná (state)) Maringá	2–2	1–0
Sport (Pernambuco)	2–2 (4–2 p)	(Santa Catarina (state)) Chapecoense	0–2	2–0
Flamengo (Rio de Janeiro (state))	2–0	(Pernambuco) Salgueiro	2–0	−
Náutico (Pernambuco)	2–0	(Bahia) Jacuipense	2–0	−
Goiás	3–1	(Pará) Independente Tucuruí	0−1	3–0
Portuguesa (São Paulo (state))	2−3	(São Paulo (state)) Ituano	1−1	1−2
Coritiba (Paraná (state))	3–3 (11–10 p)	(Ceará) Fortaleza	1–2	2–1
Ponte Preta (São Paulo (state))	6−2	(Maranhão) Moto Club	2–1	4−1
Vasco da Gama (Rio de Janeiro (state))	1–1 (a)	(Mato Grosso) Cuiabá	1–1	0−0
Atlético Goianiense (Goiás)	3–4	(Rio Grande do Norte) América de Natal	2–4	1–0
Atlético Paranaense (Paraná (state))	2–2 (a)	(Minas Gerais) Tupi	0−1	2–1
Ceará	4–1	(Minas Gerais) América Mineiro	1–1	3–0
Grêmio (Rio Grande do Sul)	3–1	(Alagoas) CRB	3–1	−
Criciúma (Santa Catarina (state))	3–0	(São Paulo (state)) Bragantino	3–0	−
Bahia	3–1	(Mato Grosso) Luverdense	0–0	3–1
ABC (Rio Grande do Norte)	1–3	(Pará) Paysandu	0–1	1–2

=== Match 41 ===
April 29, 2015
22:00 UTC−03:00

Sampaio Corrêa (Maranhão)	1–1	(São Paulo (state)) Palmeiras
Cleitinho 87'	Report	Cristaldo 68'

Castelão, São Luís
Attendance: 17,772
Referee: Antonio Dib Moraes de Sousa (Piauí)

May 12, 2015
21:50 UTC−03:00

Palmeiras (São Paulo (state))	5–1	(Maranhão) Sampaio Corrêa
Vitor Hugo 50'; Cristaldo 56'; Zé Roberto 66', 90+2'; Kelvin 79'	Report	Diones 23'

Allianz Parque, São Paulo
Attendance: 24,443
Referee: Fabio Filipus (Paraná)

Palmeiras won 6–2 on aggregate.

=== Match 42 ===
May 13, 2015
19:30 UTC−03:00

ASA (Alagoas)	1–1	(Bahia) Vitória
Alex Henrique 61'	Report	Élton 34'

Estádio Coaracy da Mata Fonseca, Arapiraca
Attendance: 3,543
Referee: Eduardo Santana Nunes (Sergipe)

May 19, 2015
19:30 UTC−03:00

Vitória (Bahia)	2–2	(Alagoas) ASA
Escudero 47' (pen.), 87' (pen.)	Report	Rayro 53'; Didira 67' (pen.)

Estádio Manoel Barradas (Barradão), Salvador
Attendance: 3,055
Referee: Jean Pierre Gonçalves Lima (Rio Grande do Sul)

Tied 3–3 on aggregate, ASA won on away goals.

=== Match 43 ===
April 29, 2015
22:00 UTC−03:00

Capivariano (São Paulo (state))	1–2	(Rio de Janeiro (state)) Botafogo
Marllon 76'	Report	Sassá 10'; Daniel Carvalho 85'

Arena Capivari, Capivari
Attendance: 1,272
Referee: Leonardo Sigari (Paraná)

May 6, 2015
22:00 UTC−03:00

Botafogo (Rio de Janeiro (state))	3–0	(São Paulo (state)) Capivariano
Gegê 18'; Sassá 37'; Luis Ricardo 67'	Report

Estádio Nílton Santos (Engenhão), Rio de Janeiro
Attendance: 1,273
Referee: Rodolpho Toski Marques (Paraná)

Botafogo won 5–1 on aggregate.

=== Match 44 ===
May 6, 2015
22:00 UTC−03:00

Avaí (Santa Catarina (state))	1–0	(Santa Catarina (state)) Figueirense
Anderson Lopes 14'	Report

Estádio da Ressacada, Florianópolis
Attendance: 11,462
Referee: Rodrigo D'Alonso Ferreira (Santa Catarina)

May 13, 2015
22:00 UTC−03:00

Figueirense (Santa Catarina (state))	2–0	(Santa Catarina (state)) Avaí
Thiago Heleno 13'; Marquinhos Pedroso 14'	Report

Estádio Orlando Scarpelli, Florianópolis
Attendance: 11,736
Referee: Celio Amorim (Santa Catarina)

Figueirense won 2–1 on aggregate.

=== Match 45 ===
May 6, 2015
22:00 UTC−03:00

Maringá (Paraná (state))	2–2	(São Paulo (state)) Santos
Fabiano 83'; Rodrigo Dantas 90+2'	Report	Elano 24'; Marquinhos Gabriel 55'

Estádio Regional Willie Davids, Maringá
Attendance: 16,142
Referee: Thiago de Alencar Gonzaga (Mato Grosso do Sul)

May 13, 2015
19:30 UTC−03:00

Santos (São Paulo (state))	1–0	(Paraná (state)) Maringá
Ricardo Oliveira 90+1'	Report

Estádio Urbano Caldeira (Vila Belmiro), Santos
Attendance: 4,068
Referee: Wagner Reway (Mato Grosso)

Santos won 3–2 on aggregate.

=== Match 46 ===
May 6, 2015
22:00 UTC−03:00

Chapecoense (Santa Catarina (state))	2–0	(Pernambuco) Sport
Hyoran 74'; Maranhão 79'	Report

Arena Condá, Chapecó
Attendance: 5,740
Referee: Igor Junio Benevenuto (Minas Gerais)

May 13, 2015
22:00 UTC−03:00

Sport (Pernambuco)	2–0	(Santa Catarina (state)) Chapecoense
Mike 70'; Diego Souza 72'	Report
Penalties
Diego Souza (penalty scored); Samuel (penalty scored); Wendel (penalty scored); Vítor (penalty scored)	4–2	(penalty scored) Camilo; (penalty scored) Hyoran; (penalty missed) Bruno Rangel; (penalty missed) Maranhão

Estádio Ilha do Retiro, Recife
Attendance: 9,012
Referee: Caio Max Augusto Vieira (Rio Grande do Norte)

Tied 2–2 on aggregate, Sport won on penalties.

=== Match 47 ===
April 22, 2015
22:00 UTC−03:00

Salgueiro (Pernambuco)	0–2	(Rio de Janeiro (state)) Flamengo
	Report	Arthur Maia 40'; Marcelo Cirino 48'

Estádio Cornélio de Barros, Salgueiro
Attendance: 4,900
Referee: Guilherme Ceretta de Lima (São Paulo)

Flamengo advanced directly due to winning by 2 or more goals difference.

=== Match 48 ===
April 30, 2015
19:30 UTC−03:00

Jacuipense (Bahia)	0–2	(Pernambuco) Náutico
	Report	Josimar 50'; Patrick Vieira 56'

Estádio Eliel Martins (Valfredão), Riachão do Jacuípe
Attendance: 3,611
Referee: Cleisson Veloso Pereira (Minas Gerais)

Náutico advanced directly due to winning by 2 or more goals difference.

=== Match 49 ===
May 7, 2015
19:30 UTC−03:00

Independente Tucuruí (Pará)	1–0	Goiás
Joãozinho 89'	Report

Estádio Antônio Dias (Navegantão), Tucuruí
Attendance: 1,864
Referee: Ranildo Oliveira de Souza (Maranhão)

May 13, 2015
19:30 UTC−03:00

Goiás	3–0	(Pará) Independente Tucuruí
Rodrigo 80'; Wesley 86'; Erik 90'	Report

Estádio Serra Dourada, Goiânia
Attendance: 3,503
Referee: Ranilton Oliveira de Sousa (Maranhão)

Goiás won 3–1 on aggregate.

=== Match 50 ===
April 23, 2015
19:30 UTC−03:00

Ituano (São Paulo (state))	1–1	(São Paulo (state)) Portuguesa
Walfrido 50'	Report	Léo Costa 45'

Estádio Novelli Júnior, Itu
Attendance: 2,434
Referee: Adriano de Assis Miranda (São Paulo)

April 28, 2015
21:50 UTC−03:00

Portuguesa (São Paulo (state))	1–2	(São Paulo (state)) Ituano
Renan 67'	Report	Clayson 45'; Ronaldo 89' (pen.)

Estádio do Canindé, São Paulo
Attendance: 1,242
Referee: Aurélio Santana Martins (São Paulo)

Ituano won 3–2 on aggregate.

=== Match 51 ===
May 6, 2015
19:30 UTC−03:00

Fortaleza (Ceará)	2–1	(Paraná (state)) Coritiba
Wanderson 23'; Adalberto 52'	Report	Rafhael Lucas 36'

Castelão, Fortaleza
Attendance: 8,553
Referee: Renan Roberto de Souza (Paraíba)

May 13, 2015
22:00 UTC−03:00

Coritiba (Paraná (state))	2–1	(Ceará) Fortaleza
Ruy 40'; Rafhael Lucas 56'	Report	Daniel Sobralense 53'
Penalties
Leandro Almeida (penalty scored); Ivan (penalty scored); João Paulo (penalty scored); Wallyson (penalty scored); Rafhael Lucas (penalty scored); Rosinei (penalty scored); Thiago Galhardo (penalty scored); Leandro Silva (penalty scored); Hélder (penalty scored); Welinton (penalty scored); Bruno (penalty scored)	11–10	(penalty scored) Elias; (penalty scored) Maranhão; (penalty scored) Adalberto; (penalty scored) Lúcio Maranhão; (penalty scored) Corrêa; (penalty scored) Lima; (penalty scored) Tinga; (penalty scored) Radar; (penalty scored) Auremir; (penalty scored) Cassiano; (penalty missed) Deola

Estádio Couto Pereira, Curitiba
Attendance: 7,510
Referee: Wallace Correa Maia (Rio de Janeiro

Tied 3–3 on aggregate, Coritiba won on penalties.

=== Match 52 ===
May 7, 2015
19:30 UTC−03:00

Moto Club (Maranhão)	1–2	(São Paulo (state)) Ponte Preta
Rayllan 78'	Report	Wanderson 34'; Leandrinho 58'

Castelão, São Luís
Attendance: 3,060
Referee: Pablo Ramon Gonçalves Pinheiro (Rio Grande do Norte)

May 13, 2015
19:30 UTC−03:00

Ponte Preta (São Paulo (state))	4–1	(Maranhão) Moto Club
Borges 33'; Cesinha 74', 90'; Diego Oliveira 86'	Report	Rayllan 62'

Estádio Moisés Lucarelli, Campinas
Attendance: 3,913
Referee: Bruno Arleu de Araújo (Rio de Janeiro)

Ponte Preta won 6–2 on aggregate.

=== Match 53 ===
May 13, 2015
22:00 UTC−03:00

Cuiabá (Mato Grosso)	1–1	(Rio de Janeiro (state)) Vasco da Gama
Maninho 80'	Report	Rodrigo 90+4'

Arena Pantanal, Cuiabá
Attendance: 7,611
Referee: Vinicius Gonçalves Dias Araújo (São Paulo)

May 20, 2015
22:00 UTC−03:00

Vasco da Gama (Rio de Janeiro (state))	0–0	(Mato Grosso) Cuiabá
	Report

Estádio São Januário, Rio de Janeiro
Attendance: 1,864
Referee: Jailson Macedo Freitas (Bahia)

Tied 1–1 on aggregate, Vasco da Gama won on away goals.

=== Match 54 ===
May 12, 2015
19:30 UTC−03:00

América de Natal (Rio Grande do Norte)	4–2	(Goiás) Atlético Goianiense
Álvaro 16'; Thiago Potyguar 22'; Adriano Pardal 27'; Max 82'	Report	Juninho 55'; Ayrton 57'

Arena das Dunas, Natal
Attendance: 2,715
Referee: Pablo dos Santos Alves (Paraíba)

May 20, 2015
19:30 UTC−03:00

Atlético Goianiense (Goiás)	1–0	(Rio Grande do Norte) América de Natal
Juninho 65'	Report

Estádio Serra Dourada, Goiânia
Attendance: 1,342
Referee: Marcos André Gomes da Penha (Espírito Santo)

América de Natal won 4–3 on aggregate.

=== Match 55 ===
April 28, 2015
21:50 UTC−03:00

Tupi (Minas Gerais)	1–0	(Paraná (state)) Atlético Paranaense
Vinicius Kiss 72'	Report

Estádio Radialista Mário Helênio, Juiz de Fora
Attendance: 1,695
Referee: Vinicius Dias Araujo (São Paulo)

May 6, 2015
19:30 UTC−03:00

Atlético Paranaense (Paraná (state))	2–1	(Minas Gerais) Tupi
Damasceno 19'; Walter 61'	Report	Daniel Morais 30'

Arena da Baixada, Curitiba
Attendance: 9,794
Referee: Flavio Rodrigues Guerra (São Paulo)

Tied 2–2 on aggregate, Tupi won on away goals.

=== Match 56 ===
May 12, 2015
19:30 UTC−03:00

América Mineiro (Minas Gerais)	1–1	Ceará
Wesley Ladeira 35'	Report	William 24'

Estádio Raimundo Sampaio (Independência), Belo Horizonte
Attendance: 978
Referee: Vanderlei Soares de Macedo (Distrito Federal)

May 20, 2015
22:00 UTC−03:00

Ceará	3–0	(Minas Gerais) América Mineiro
Marinho 13'; Assisinho 68', 90'	Report

Estádio Presidente Vargas, Fortaleza
Attendance: 4,698
Referee: Emerson Luiz Sobral (Pernambuco)

Ceará won 4–1 on aggregate.

=== Match 57 ===
May 13, 2015
19:30 UTC−03:00

CRB (Alagoas)	1–3	(Rio Grande do Sul) Grêmio
Emaxwell 71'	Report	Luan 12'; Pedro Rocha 36', 43'

Estádio Rei Pelé, Maceió
Attendance: 8,074
Referee: Marielson Alves Silva (Bahia)

Grêmio advanced directly due to winning by 2 or more goals difference.

=== Match 58 ===
April 23, 2015
21:00 UTC−03:00

Bragantino (São Paulo (state))	0–3	(Santa Catarina (state)) Criciúma
	Report	Bruno Lopes 14'; Paulo Sérgio 80'; Jefferson 90+3'

Estádio Nabi Abi Chedid, Bragança Paulista
Attendance: 525
Referee: Wagner Reway (Mato Grosso)

Criciúma advanced directly due to winning by 2 or more goals difference.

=== Match 59 ===
May 12, 2015
21:50 UTC−03:00

Luverdense (Mato Grosso)	0–0	Bahia
	Report

Estádio Passo das Emas, Lucas do Rio Verde
Attendance: 1,305
Referee: Vinícius Furlan (São Paulo)

May 20, 2015
22:00 UTC−03:00

Bahia	3–1	(Mato Grosso) Luverdense
Léo Gamalho 15'; Tiago Real 27'; Willians 90+2'	Report	Paulinho 61'

Itaipava Arena Fonte Nova, Salvador
Attendance: 4,708
Referee: Renan Roberto de Souza (Paraíba)

Bahia won 3–1 on aggregate.

=== Match 60 ===
May 12, 2015
19:30 UTC−03:00

Paysandu (Pará)	1–0	(Rio Grande do Norte) ABC
Leandro Cearense 61'	Report

Estádio Leônidas Sodré de Castro (Curuzu), Belém
Attendance: 15,423
Referee: Antonio Carlos Pequeno Frutuoso (Amazonas)

May 19, 2015
19:30 UTC−03:00

ABC (Rio Grande do Norte)	1–2	(Pará) Paysandu
Bruno Luiz 47'	Report	Yago Pikachu 67' (pen.); Carlos Alberto 74'

Frasqueirão, Natal
Attendance: 5,918
Referee: Guilherme Ceretta (São Paulo)

Paysandu won 3–1 on aggregate.
