= 2015 Copa do Brasil knockout stage =

The knockout stages of the 2015 Copa do Brasil will be played from August 19 to November 25, 2015. A total of 16 teams will compete in the knockout stages.

The draw for the Round of 16 was held by CBF on 4 August 2015. The 16 qualified teams were divided in two pots. Teams from pot 1 were the six teams directly qualified to the Round of 16, the five teams that competed at the 2015 Copa Libertadores and the best placed team in the 2014 Brazilian Série A not taking part in the 2015 Copa Libertadores, plus the two highest CBF ranked teams qualified via the Third Round. Pot 2 was composed of the other teams that qualified through the Third Round. Each pot was divided into 4 pairs according to the CBF ranking. For the remaining stages of the tournament a new draw was held on 31 August 2015.

== Seeding ==
Pot 1	Pot 2
(Minas Gerais) Cruzeiro (1); (São Paulo (state)) Corinthians (2); (Rio de Janeiro (state)) Flamengo (3); (Rio Grande do Sul) Grêmio (4); (Minas Gerais) Atlético Mineiro (6); (São Paulo (state)) São Paulo (7); (Rio de Janeiro (state)) Fluminense (8); (Rio Grande do Sul) Internacional (9)	(São Paulo (state)) Santos (5); (Rio de Janeiro (state)) Vasco da Gama (12); (São Paulo (state)) Palmeiras (13); (Paraná (state)) Coritiba (14); Ceará (19); (Santa Catarina (state)) Figueirense (21); (Pará) Paysandu (34); (São Paulo (state)) Ituano (139)

=== Bracket ===
Round of 16
(São Paulo (state)) São Paulo	1	3	4
Ceará	2	0	2
(Rio de Janeiro (state)) Flamengo	0	1	1
(Rio de Janeiro (state)) Vasco da Gama	1	1	2
(Minas Gerais) Atlético Mineiro	1	1	2
(Santa Catarina (state)) Figueirense	1	2	3
(São Paulo (state)) Santos	2	2	4
(São Paulo (state)) Corinthians	0	1	1
(Rio de Janeiro (state)) Fluminense	2	2	4
(Pará) Paysandu	1	1	2
(Paraná (state)) Coritiba	0	1	1
(Rio Grande do Sul) Grêmio	1	3	4
(Rio Grande do Sul) Internacional	2	2	4
(São Paulo (state)) Ituano	0	1	1
(São Paulo (state)) Palmeiras	2	3	5
(Minas Gerais) Cruzeiro	1	2	3

Quarterfinals
(São Paulo (state)) São Paulo	3	1	4
(Rio de Janeiro (state)) Vasco da Gama	0	1	1
(Santa Catarina (state)) Figueirense	0	2	2
(São Paulo (state)) Santos	1	3	4
(Rio de Janeiro (state)) Fluminense (a)	0	1	1
(Rio Grande do Sul) Grêmio	0	1	1
(Rio Grande do Sul) Internacional	1	2	3
(São Paulo (state)) Palmeiras	1	3	4

Semifinals
(São Paulo (state)) São Paulo	1	1	2
(São Paulo (state)) Santos	3	3	6
(Rio de Janeiro (state)) Fluminense	2	1	3 (1)
(São Paulo (state)) Palmeiras (p)	1	2	3 (4)

Finals
(São Paulo (state)) Santos	1	1	2 (3)
(São Paulo (state)) Palmeiras (p)	0	2	2 (4)

== Round of 16 ==
Team 1	Agg.	Team 2	1st leg	2nd leg
Ituano (São Paulo (state))	1–4	(Rio Grande do Sul) Internacional	0–2	1–2
Ceará	2–4	(São Paulo (state)) São Paulo	2–1	0–3
Cruzeiro (Minas Gerais)	3–5	(São Paulo (state)) Palmeiras	1–2	2–3
Vasco da Gama (Rio de Janeiro (state))	2–1	(Rio de Janeiro (state)) Flamengo	1–0	1–1
Paysandu (Pará)	2–4	(Rio de Janeiro (state)) Fluminense	1–2	1–2
Grêmio (Rio Grande do Sul)	4–1	(Paraná (state)) Coritiba	1–0	3–1
Figueirense (Santa Catarina (state))	3–2	(Minas Gerais) Atlético Mineiro	1–1	2–1
Corinthians (São Paulo (state))	1–4	(São Paulo (state)) Santos	0–2	1–2

=== Match 71 ===
August 20, 2015
19:00 UTC−3

Internacional (Rio Grande do Sul)	2–0	(São Paulo (state)) Ituano
Vitinho 14'; Valdívia 16'	Report

Estádio Beira-Rio, Porto Alegre
Attendance: 27,349
Referee: Elmo Alves Resende Cunha (Goiás)

August 27, 2015
20:00 UTC−3

Ituano (São Paulo (state))	1–2	(Rio Grande do Sul) Internacional
Ronaldo 67'	Report	Valdívia 5'; Eduardo Sasha 74'

Estádio Novelli Júnior, Itu
Attendance: 5,300
Referee: Marcelo de Lima Henrique (Pernambuco)

Internacional won 4–1 on aggregate and advanced to the Quarterfinals.

=== Match 72 ===
August 20, 2015
21:30 UTC−3

São Paulo (São Paulo (state))	1–2	Ceará
Alexandre Pato 67'	Report	Rafael Costa 17', 65' (pen.)

Estádio do Morumbi, São Paulo
Attendance: 13,015
Referee: Dewson Fernando Freitas da Silva (Pará)

August 26, 2015
19:30 UTC−3

Ceará	0–3	(São Paulo (state)) São Paulo
	Report	Rogério Ceni 45' (pen.); Thiago Mendes 55'; Alexandre Pato 75'

Estádio Castelão, Fortaleza
Attendance: 41,020
Referee: Pablo dos Santos Alves (Paraíba)

São Paulo won 4–2 on aggregate and advanced to the Quarterfinals.

=== Match 73 ===
August 19, 2015
22:00 UTC−3

Palmeiras (São Paulo (state))	2–1	(Minas Gerais) Cruzeiro
Cleiton Xavier 7'; Rafael Marques 62'	Report	Leandro Damião 49'

Allianz Parque, São Paulo
Attendance: 24,889
Referee: Marcelo de Lima Henrique (Pernambuco)

August 26, 2015
22:00 UTC−3

Cruzeiro (Minas Gerais)	2–3	(São Paulo (state)) Palmeiras
Vinícius Araújo 38'; Alisson 75' (pen.)	Report	Barrios 8'; Gabriel Jesus 27', 32'

Estádio do Mineirão, Belo Horizonte
Attendance: 16,972
Referee: Anderson Daronco (Rio Grande do Sul)

Palmeiras won 5–3 on aggregate and advanced to the Quarterfinals.

=== Match 74 ===
August 19, 2015
22:00 UTC−3

Flamengo (Rio de Janeiro (state))	0–1	(Rio de Janeiro (state)) Vasco da Gama
	Report	Jorge Henrique 57'

Estádio do Maracanã, Rio de Janeiro
Attendance: 34,844
Referee: Ricardo Marques Ribeiro (Minas Gerais)

August 26, 2015
22:00 UTC−3

Vasco da Gama (Rio de Janeiro (state))	1–1	(Rio de Janeiro (state)) Flamengo
Rafael Silva 81'	Report	Mádson 5' (o.g.)

Estádio do Maracanã, Rio de Janeiro
Attendance: 49,367
Referee: Wilton Pereira Sampaio (Goiás)

Vasco da Gama won 2–1 on aggregate and advanced to the Quarterfinals.

=== Match 75 ===
August 20, 2015
19:00 UTC−3

Fluminense (Rio de Janeiro (state))	2–1	(Pará) Paysandu
Magno Alves 55'; Renato 90+3'	Report	Yago Pikachu 71'

Estádio do Maracanã, Rio de Janeiro
Attendance: 13,523
Referee: Igor Junio Benevenuto (Minas Gerais)

August 26, 2015
19:30 UTC−3

Paysandu (Pará)	1–2	(Rio de Janeiro (state)) Fluminense
Yago Pikachu 40' (pen.)	Report	Cícero 15'; Marcos Júnior 53'

Estádio Mangueirão, Belém
Attendance: 33,911
Referee: Luis Teixeira Rocha (Rio Grande do Sul)

Fluminense won 4–2 on aggregate and advanced to the Quarterfinals.

=== Match 76 ===
August 19, 2015
19:30 UTC−3

Coritiba (Paraná (state))	0–1	(Rio Grande do Sul) Grêmio
	Report	Marcelo Oliveira 71'

Estádio Couto Pereira, Curitiba
Attendance: 14,517
Referee: Sandro Meira Ricci (Santa Catarina)

August 27, 2015
21:00 UTC−3

Grêmio (Rio Grande do Sul)	3–1	(Paraná (state)) Coritiba
Pedro Geromel 37'; Douglas 55'; Luan 90+4' (pen.)	Report	Rafhael Lucas 39'

Arena do Grêmio, Porto Alegre
Attendance: 22,728
Referee: Thiago Duarte Peixoto (São Paulo)

Grêmio won 4–1 on aggregate and advanced to the Quarterfinals.

=== Match 77 ===
August 19, 2015
19:30 UTC−3

Atlético Mineiro (Minas Gerais)	1–1	(Santa Catarina (state)) Figueirense
Leonardo Silva 90+2'	Report	Clayton 45+3'

Estádio Independência, Belo Horizonte
Attendance: 16,123
Referee: Rodolpho Toski Marques (Paraná)

August 26, 2015
19:30 UTC−3

Figueirense (Santa Catarina (state))	2–1	(Minas Gerais) Atlético Mineiro
Leandro Silva 72'; Marcão 89'	Report	Edcarlos 44'

Estádio Orlando Scarpelli, Florianópolis
Attendance: 7,415
Referee: Vinicius Furlan (São Paulo)

Figueirense won 3–2 on aggregate and advanced to the Quarterfinals.

=== Match 78 ===
August 19, 2015
22:00 UTC−3

Santos (São Paulo (state))	2–0	(São Paulo (state)) Corinthians
Gabriel 31'; Marquinhos Gabriel 78'	Report

Vila Belmiro, Santos
Attendance: 10,383
Referee: Wilton Pereira Sampaio (Goiás)

August 26, 2015
22:00 UTC−3

Corinthians (São Paulo (state))	1–2	(São Paulo (state)) Santos
Romero 72'	Report	Gabriel 14'; Ricardo Oliveira 64'

Arena Corinthians, São Paulo
Attendance: 37,338
Referee: Ricardo Marques Ribeiro (Minas Gerais)

Santos won 4–1 on aggregate and advanced to the Quarterfinals.

== Quarterfinals ==
Team 1	Agg.	Team 2	1st leg	2nd leg
Vasco da Gama (Rio de Janeiro (state))	1–4	(São Paulo (state)) São Paulo	0–3	1–1
Santos (São Paulo (state))	4–2	(Santa Catarina (state)) Figueirense	1–0	3–2
Palmeiras (São Paulo (state))	4–3	(Rio Grande do Sul) Internacional	1–1	3–2
Grêmio (Rio Grande do Sul)	1–1 (a)	(Rio de Janeiro (state)) Fluminense	0–0	1–1

=== Match 79 ===
September 23, 2015
22:00 UTC−3

São Paulo (São Paulo (state))	3–0	(Rio de Janeiro (state)) Vasco da Gama
Alexandre Pato 26', 36'; Luís Fabiano 75'	Report

Estádio do Morumbi, São Paulo
Attendance: 23,326
Referee: Wilton Pereira Sampaio (Goiás)

September 30, 2015
22:00 UTC−3

Vasco da Gama (Rio de Janeiro (state))	1–1	(São Paulo (state)) São Paulo
Riascos 16'	Report	Centurión 59'

Estádio do Maracanã, Rio de Janeiro
Attendance: 6,327
Referee: Marielson Alves Silva (Bahia)

São Paulo won 4–1 on aggregate and advanced to the Semifinals.

=== Match 80 ===
September 23, 2015
19:30 UTC−3

Figueirense (Santa Catarina (state))	0–1	(São Paulo (state)) Santos
	Report	Gabriel 78' (pen.)

Estádio Orlando Scarpelli, Florianópolis
Attendance: 9,580
Referee: Anderson Daronco (Rio Grande do Sul)

October 1, 2015
21:00 UTC−3

Santos (São Paulo (state))	3–2	(Santa Catarina (state)) Figueirense
Gabriel 20'; Marquinhos Gabriel 28'; Neto Berola 47'	Report	Bruno Alves 36'; Carlos Alberto 86'

Estádio do Pacaembu, São Paulo
Attendance: 29,468
Referee: André Luiz de Freitas Castro (Goiás)

Santos won 4–2 on aggregate and advanced to the Semifinals.

=== Match 81 ===
September 23, 2015
19:30 UTC−3

Internacional (Rio Grande do Sul)	1–1	(São Paulo (state)) Palmeiras
Alex 53'	Report	Rafael Marques 72'

Estádio Beira-Rio, Porto Alegre
Attendance: 34,732
Referee: Sandro Ricci (Santa Catarina)

September 30, 2015
22:00 UTC−3

Palmeiras (São Paulo (state))	3–2	(Rio Grande do Sul) Internacional
Vitor Hugo 7'; Zé Roberto 38' (pen.); Andrei Girotto 74'	Report	Anderson 56'; López 73'

Allianz Parque, São Paulo
Attendance: 33,991
Referee: Wilton Pereira Sampaio (Goiás)

Palmeiras won 4–3 on aggregate and advanced to the Semifinals.

=== Match 82 ===
September 23, 2015
22:00 UTC−3

Fluminense (Rio de Janeiro (state))	0–0	(Rio Grande do Sul) Grêmio
	Report

Estádio do Maracanã, Rio de Janeiro
Attendance: 9,637
Referee: Luiz Flávio de Oliveira (São Paulo)

September 30, 2015
22:00 UTC−3

Grêmio (Rio Grande do Sul)	1–1	(Rio de Janeiro (state)) Fluminense
Bobô 74'	Report	Fred 39'

Arena do Grêmio, Porto Alegre
Attendance: 45,751
Referee: Ricardo Marques (Minas Gerais)

Tied 1–1 on aggregate, Fluminense won on away goals and advanced to the Semifinals

== Semifinals ==
Team 1	Agg.	Team 2	1st leg	2nd leg
Santos (São Paulo (state))	6–2	(São Paulo (state)) São Paulo	3–1	3–1
Palmeiras (São Paulo (state))	3–3 (4–1 p)	(Rio de Janeiro (state)) Fluminense	1–2	2–1

=== Match 83 ===
October 21, 2015
22:00 UTC−2

São Paulo (São Paulo (state))	1–3	(São Paulo (state)) Santos
Alexandre Pato 25'	Report	Gabriel 14'; Ricardo Oliveira 46'; Marquinhos Gabriel 49'

Estádio do Morumbi, São Paulo
Attendance: 26,434
Referee: Raphael Claus (São Paulo)

October 28, 2015
22:00 UTC−2

Santos (São Paulo (state))	3–1	(São Paulo (state)) São Paulo
Ricardo Oliveira 11', 23'; Marquinhos Gabriel 20'	Report	Michel Bastos 71'

Vila Belmiro, Santos
Attendance: 13,932
Referee: Luiz Flávio de Oliveira (São Paulo)

Santos won 6–2 on aggregate and advanced to the Finals.

=== Match 84 ===
October 21, 2015
22:00 DST: UTC−02:00

Fluminense (Rio de Janeiro (state))	2–1	(São Paulo (state)) Palmeiras
Marcos Júnior 28'; Gum 41'	Report	Zé Roberto 60' (pen.)

Estádio do Maracanã, Rio de Janeiro
Attendance: 34,895
Referee: Leandro Vuaden (Rio Grande do Sul)

October 28, 2015
22:00 DST: UTC−02:00

Palmeiras (São Paulo (state))	2–1	(Rio de Janeiro (state)) Fluminense
Barrios 13', 17'	Report	Fred 70'
Penalties
Rafael Marques (penalty scored); Jackson (penalty scored); Cristaldo (penalty scored); Allione (penalty scored)	4–1	(penalty scored) Jean; (penalty missed) Gustavo Scarpa; (penalty missed) Gum

Allianz Parque, São Paulo
Attendance: 38,562
Referee: Anderson Daronco (Rio Grande do Sul)

Tied 3–3 on aggregate, Palmeiras won on penalties and advanced to the Finals.

== Finals ==
November 25, 2015
22:00 DST: UTC−02:00

Santos (São Paulo (state))	1–0	(São Paulo (state)) Palmeiras
Gabriel 78'	Report

Vila Belmiro, Santos
Attendance: 14,116
Referee: Luiz Flávio de Oliveira (São Paulo) (replaced by Marcelo Aparecido de Souza (SP) - 67')

December 2, 2015
22:00 DST: UTC−02:00

Palmeiras (São Paulo (state))	2–1	(São Paulo (state)) Santos
Dudu 56', 84'	Report	Ricardo Oliveira 86'
Penalties
Zé Roberto (penalty scored); Rafael Marques (penalty missed); Jackson (penalty scored); Cristaldo (penalty scored); Fernando Prass (penalty scored)	4–3	(penalty missed) Marquinhos Gabriel; (penalty missed) Gustavo Henrique; (penalty scored) Geuvânio; (penalty scored) Lucas Lima; (penalty scored) Ricardo Oliveira

Allianz Parque, São Paulo
Attendance: 39,660
Referee: Héber Lopes (Santa Catarina)

Tied 2–2 on aggregate, Palmeiras won on penalties.
