= 2015 Copa do Brasil Third Round =

The 2015 Copa do Brasil Third Round will be played from 20 May to 22 July 2015 to decide the 10 teams advancing to the knockout rounds. Different than the first two rounds, in this round the away team that wins the first match by 2 or more goals do not progress straight to the next round avoiding the second leg. The order of the matches was determined by a random draw. This phase had a pause during the 2015 Copa América.

== Third round ==
Team 1	Agg.	Team 2	1st leg	2nd leg
ASA (Alagoas)	0–1	(São Paulo (state)) Palmeiras	0–0	0–1
Botafogo (Rio de Janeiro (state))	2–3	(Santa Catarina (state)) Figueirense	2–2	0–1
Santos (São Paulo (state))	4-3	(Pernambuco) Sport	1–2	3-1
Náutico (Pernambuco)	1–3	(Rio de Janeiro (state)) Flamengo	1–1	0–2
Goiás	3–3 (a)	(São Paulo (state)) Ituano	0–2	3–1
Ponte Preta (São Paulo (state))	3-3 (1-3 p)	(Paraná (state)) Coritiba	1–2	2-1
América de Natal (Rio Grande do Norte)	3-6	(Rio de Janeiro (state)) Vasco da Gama	1–3	2-3
Tupi (Minas Gerais)	1–2	Ceará	0–0	1-2
Criciúma (Santa Catarina (state))	1-1 (3-4 p)	(Rio Grande do Sul) Grêmio	1–0	0-1
Bahia	2–3	(Pará) Paysandu	0–3	2-0

=== Match 61 ===
May 27, 2015
22:00 UTC−03:00

Palmeiras (São Paulo (state))	0–0	(Alagoas) ASA
	Report

Allianz Parque, São Paulo
Attendance: 17,212
Referee: Rodolpho Toski Marques (Paraná)

July 15, 2015
22:00 UTC−03:00

ASA (Alagoas)	0–1	(São Paulo (state)) Palmeiras
	Report	Gabriel Jesus 70'

Estádio do Café, Londrina
Attendance: 19,006
Referee: Paulo Roberto Alves Júnior

Palmeiras won 1–0 on aggregate.

=== Match 62 ===
May 20, 2015
19:30 UTC−03:00

Figueirense (Santa Catarina (state))	2–2	(Rio de Janeiro (state)) Botafogo
Clayton 30'; Emerson 50' (o.g.)	Report	Diego Giaretta 79'; Luis Ricardo 90+3'

Estádio Orlando Scarpelli, Florianópolis
Attendance: 6,658
Referee: Marcelo Aparecido Ribeiro de Souza (São Paulo)

July 14, 2015
21:00 UTC−03:00

Botafogo (Rio de Janeiro (state))	0–1	(Santa Catarina (state)) Figueirense
	Report	Marcão 90+1'

Estádio Nílton Santos (Engenhão), Rio de Janeiro
Attendance: 7,116
Referee: Flávio Rodrigues Guerra (São Paulo)

Figueirense won 3–2 on aggregate.

=== Match 63 ===
May 20, 2015
22:00 UTC−03:00

Sport (Pernambuco)	2–1	(São Paulo (state)) Santos
Régis 4'; Renê 74'	Report	Lucas Lima 21'

Estádio Ilha do Retiro, Recife
Attendance: 6,443
Referee: Claudio Francisco Lima e Silva (Sergipe)

July 22, 2015
22:00 UTC−03:00

Santos (São Paulo (state))	3-1	(Pernambuco) Sport
Gabriel 1', 35'; Geuvânio 57'	Report	Diego Souza 39'

Estádio Urbano Caldeira (Vila Belmiro), Santos
Attendance: 8,370
Referee: Paulo Henrique de Melo Salmazio (Mato Grosso do Sul)

Santos won 4-3 on aggregate.

=== Match 64 ===
May 27, 2015
22:00 UTC−03:00

Flamengo (Rio de Janeiro (state))	1–1	(Pernambuco) Náutico
Wallace 42'	Report	Douglas 76'

Maracanã Stadium, Rio de Janeiro
Attendance: 7,001
Referee: Francisco Carlos do Nascimento (Alagoas)

July 15, 2015
22:00 UTC−03:00

Náutico (Pernambuco)	0-2	(Rio de Janeiro (state)) Flamengo
	Report	Jorge 50'; Paolo Guerrero 76'

Arena Pernambuco, São Lourenço da Mata
Attendance: 16,744
Referee: Claudio Francisco Lima e Silva (Sergipe)

Flamengo won 3-1 on aggregate.

=== Match 65 ===
May 20, 2015
19:30 UTC−03:00

Ituano (São Paulo (state))	2–0	Goiás
Ronaldo 79' (pen.), 88'	Report

Estádio Novelli Júnior, Itu
Attendance: 3,150
Referee: Braulio da Silva Machado (Santa Catarina)

May 27, 2015
19:30 UTC−03:00

Goiás	3–1	(São Paulo (state)) Ituano
Erik 29'; Wesley 79'; Arthur 87'	Report	Ronaldo 78' (pen.)

Estádio Serra Dourada, Goiânia
Attendance: 6,388
Referee: Igor Junior Benevenuto (Minas Gerais)

Tied 3–3 on aggregate, Ituano won on away goals.

=== Match 66 ===
May 27, 2015
19:30 UTC−03:00

Coritiba (Paraná (state))	2–1	(São Paulo (state)) Ponte Preta
Wellington Paulista 44'; Giva 85'	Report	Cesinha 28'

Estádio Couto Pereira, Curitiba
Attendance: 7,563
Referee: Alinor da Silva Paixão (Mato Grosso)

July 22, 2015
22:00 UTC−03:00

Ponte Preta (São Paulo (state))	2-1	(Paraná (state)) Coritiba
Keno 51'; Cesinha 53'	Report	Evandro 90+1'
Penalties
Fernando Bob (penalty missed); Josimar (penalty scored); Elton (penalty missed); Juninho (penalty missed)	1-3	Ivan (penalty scored); Rafhael Lucas (penalty scored); Thiago Galhardo (penalty scored)

Estádio Moisés Lucarelli, Campinas
Attendance: 3,086
Referee: Jean Pierre Gonçalves Lima (Rio Grande do Sul)

Tied 3-3 on aggregate, Coritiba won on penalties.

=== Match 67 ===
July 15, 2015
21:00 UTC−03:00

Vasco da Gama (Rio de Janeiro (state))	3–1	(Rio Grande do Norte) América de Natal
Herrera 45+2'; Anderson Salles 62' (pen.); Emanuel Biancucchi 78'	Report	Reis 52'

Estádio São Januário, Rio de Janeiro
Attendance: 2,910
Referee: Thiago Duarte Peixoto (São Paulo)

July 22, 2015
22:00 UTC−03:00

América de Natal (Rio Grande do Norte)	2-3	(Rio de Janeiro (state)) Vasco da Gama
Cascata 47' (pen.); Adriano Pardal 54'	Report	Riascos 20', 45'; Rafael Silva 75'

Arena das Dunas, Natal
Attendance: 17,122
Referee: Luis Teixeira Rocha (Rio Grande do Sul)

Vasco won 6-3 on aggregate.

=== Match 68 ===
July 15, 2015
19:30 UTC−03:00

Ceará	0–0	(Minas Gerais) Tupi
	Report

Estádio Presidente Vargas, Fortaleza
Attendance: 4,246
Referee: Nielson Nogueira Dias (Pernambuco)

July 22, 2015
19:30 UTC−03:00

Tupi (Minas Gerais)	1-2	Ceará
Márcio Goiano 36'	Report	Roger Gaúcho 14'; Arthur 90+3'

Estádio Radialista Mário Helênio, Juiz de Fora
Attendance: 9,076
Referee: João Batista de Arruda (Rio de Janeiro)

Ceará won 2-1 on aggregate.

=== Match 69 ===
July 14, 2015
21:00 UTC−03:00

Grêmio (Rio Grande do Sul)	0-1	(Santa Catarina (state)) Criciúma
	Report	Lucca 33'

Arena do Grêmio, Porto Alegre
Attendance: 15,673
Referee: Bruno Arleu de Araujo (Rio de Janeiro)

July 21, 2015
21:00 UTC−03:00

Criciúma (Santa Catarina (state))	0-1	(Rio Grande do Sul) Grêmio
	Report	Pedro Rocha 22'
Penalties
Paulo Sérgio (penalty missed); Maurinho (penalty scored); Fábio Ferreira (penalty scored); Cristiano (penalty scored); Luiz (penalty missed)	3-4	Maicon (penalty scored); Fernandinho (penalty scored); Rafael Galhardo (penalty scored); Braian Rodríguez (penalty missed); Douglas (penalty scored)

Estádio Heriberto Hülse, Criciúma
Attendance: 9,548
Referee: Flavio Rodrigues Guerra (São Paulo)

Tied 1-1 on aggregate, Grêmio won on penalties.

=== Match 70 ===
July 15, 2015
22:00 UTC−03:00

Paysandu (Pará)	3–0	Bahia
Misael 69'; Fahel 71'; Yago Pikachu 84'	Report

Estádio Mangueirão, Belém
Attendance: 10,159
Referee: Pathrice Wallace Correa Maia (Rio de Janeiro)

July 22, 2015
19:30 UTC−03:00

Bahia	2-0	(Pará) Paysandu
Souza 76' (pen.); Kieza 86'	Report

Itaipava Arena Fonte Nova, Salvador
Attendance: 10,460
Referee: Flavio Rodrigues de Souza (São Paulo)

Paysandu won 3-2 on aggregate.
