= Bruno Baio =

Brazilian footballer (born 1995)

Personal information
- Full name: Bruno Henrique da Cunha Baio
- Date of birth: 3 October 1995 (age 31)
- Place of birth: Cosmópolis, Brazil
- Height: 1.97 m (6 ft 5 1/2 in)
- Position: Forward

Team information
- Current team: Nanjing City
- Number: 25

Senior career*
Years	Team	Apps	(Gls)
2015–2018	Internacional	7	(0)
2016	→ Criciúma (loan)	11	(3)
2018	Boa Esporte		
2018–2020	Votuporanguense		
2019	→ Jeonnam Dragons (loan)	16	(10)
2020–2021	Daejeon Hana Citizen	53	(8)
2023	Ypiranga	10	(5)
2023	Retrô	12	(2)
2024	Sampaio Corrêa	11	(4)
2024–2025	Emirates	16	(4)
2025–2026	Uthai Thani	17	(11)
2026–	Nanjing City	0	(0)
- * Club domestic league appearances and goals as of 29 August 2025

Bruno Henrique da Cunha Baio (born 3 October 1995) is a Brazilian professional footballer who plays for China League One side Nanjing City as a forward.

== Career ==
Baio began his career at Internacional. On 23 September 2015, he was first included in a squad for the quarter-final first leg of that year's Copa do Brasil, replacing Wellington for the final 13 minutes of a 1–1 draw against eventual champions Palmeiras at the Beira-Rio. His professional debut came on 28 November, replacing Anderson for the final nine minutes of a 1–1 draw at Fluminense.

Baio had a great stint at CA Votuporanguense in 2018, where he was instrumental in winning the Copa Paulista for the first time, being one of the main names in the campaign. He scored CAV's goal in the first leg of the tournament final against Ferroviaria, which ended in a 1-1 draw. He earned the nickname BB9 after he led the team to its first participation in the Copa do Brasil in 2019.

In August 2024, Baio joined V.League 1 side Hoang Anh Gia Lai. However, the deal collapsed after he underwent surgery to remove his appendix.

On 6 August 2026, Baio transferred to China League One side Nanjing City.
