= Gabriel Jesus =

Brazilian footballer (born 1997)

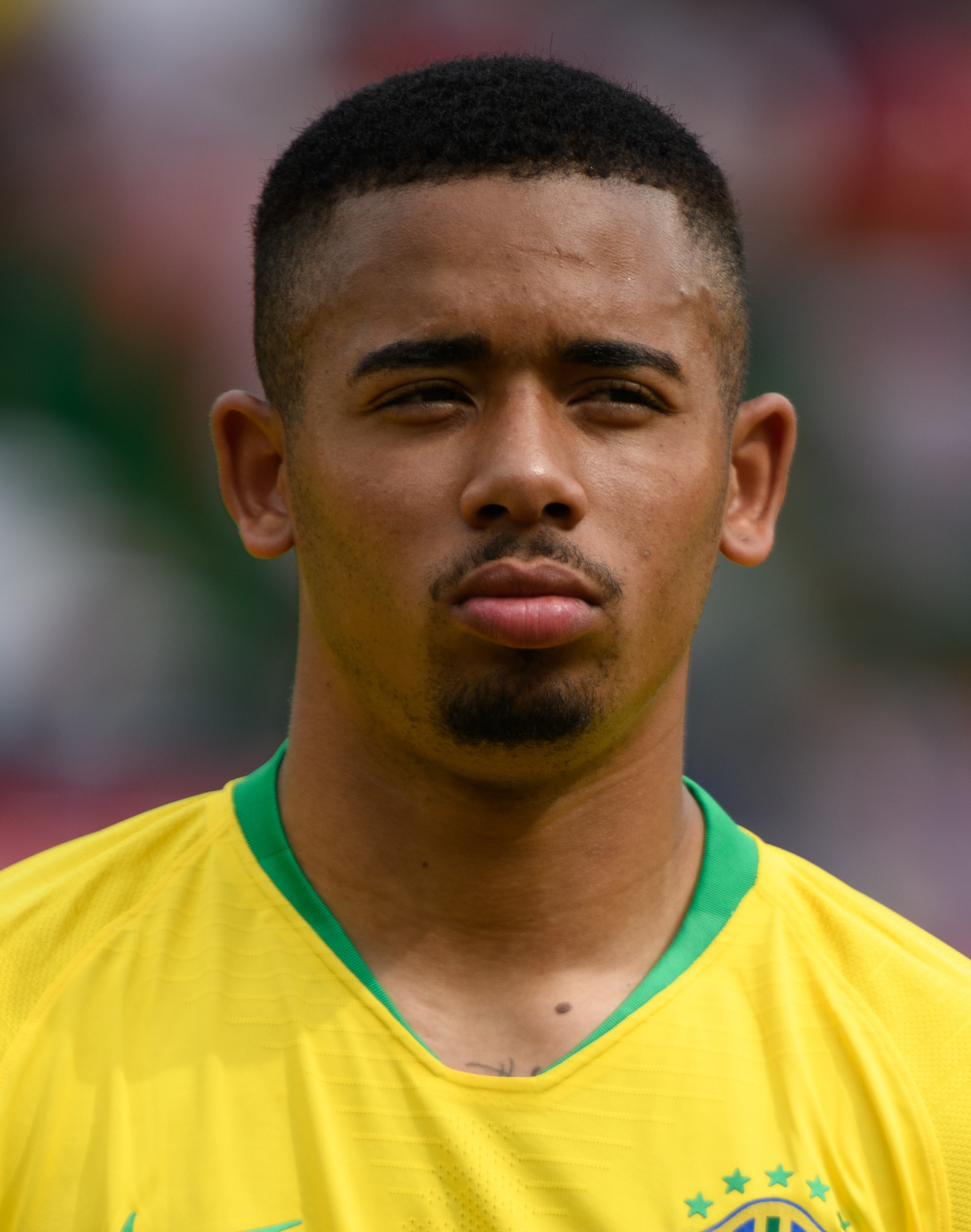
- Jesus with Brazil in 2018

Personal information
- Full name: Gabriel Fernando de Jesus
- Date of birth: 3 April 1997 (age 29)
- Place of birth: São Paulo, Brazil
- Height: 1.75 m (5 ft 9 in)
- Position: Striker

Team information
- Current team: Barcelona
- Number: 9

Youth career
- 2010–2012: Anhanguera
- 2013–2015: Palmeiras

Senior career*
Years	Team	Apps	(Gls)
2015–2017	Palmeiras	67	(21)
2017–2022	Manchester City	159	(58)
2022–2026	Arsenal	84	(21)
2026–	Barcelona	7	(3)

International career^{‡}
2015	Brazil U20	6	(1)
2015–2016	Brazil U23	11	(5)
2016–2023	Brazil	64	(19)
Medal record
Men's Football
Representing Brazil
Copa América
Winner	2019 Brazil
Runner-up	2021 Brazil
Summer Olympics
Gold medal – first place	2016 Rio de Janeiro	Team
FIFA U-20 World Cup
Runner-up	2015 New Zealand
- * Club domestic league appearances and goals as of 23:36, 31 October 2026 (UTC) ‡ National team caps and goals as of 22:10, 20 December 2025 (UTC)

Gabriel Fernando de Jesus (born 3 April 1997) is a Brazilian professional footballer who plays as a striker for La Liga club Barcelona.

Jesus began his senior club career at Palmeiras, where he was voted Best Newcomer at the 2015 Campeonato Brasileiro Série A and finished first in the Copa do Brasil. In 2016, he won the Bola de Ouro helping Palmeiras win their first national league title in 22 years. Jesus signed with English club Manchester City in January 2017 in a transfer worth £27 million, and won four Premier League titles, three EFL Cups, and an FA Cup. In July 2022, he joined Arsenal in a deal worth £45 million.

After winning 21 caps and scoring 7 goals at youth level, including reaching the final of the 2015 FIFA U-20 World Cup and winning an Olympic gold medal at the 2016 Summer Olympics, Jesus made his senior debut for Brazil in September 2016. He was part of the squads that took part at the FIFA World Cup in 2018 and 2022, also participating at the Copa América in 2019 and 2021, winning the former tournament.

== Early life ==
Born in São Paulo, Brazil. Jesus grew up in the neighbourhood of Jardim Peri, in poor conditions as his mother Vera was a single mother to him and his two brothers. After initially playing street football, he joined amateur clubs in the region, his last one being Associação Atlética Anhanguera.

== Club career ==
=== Palmeiras ===
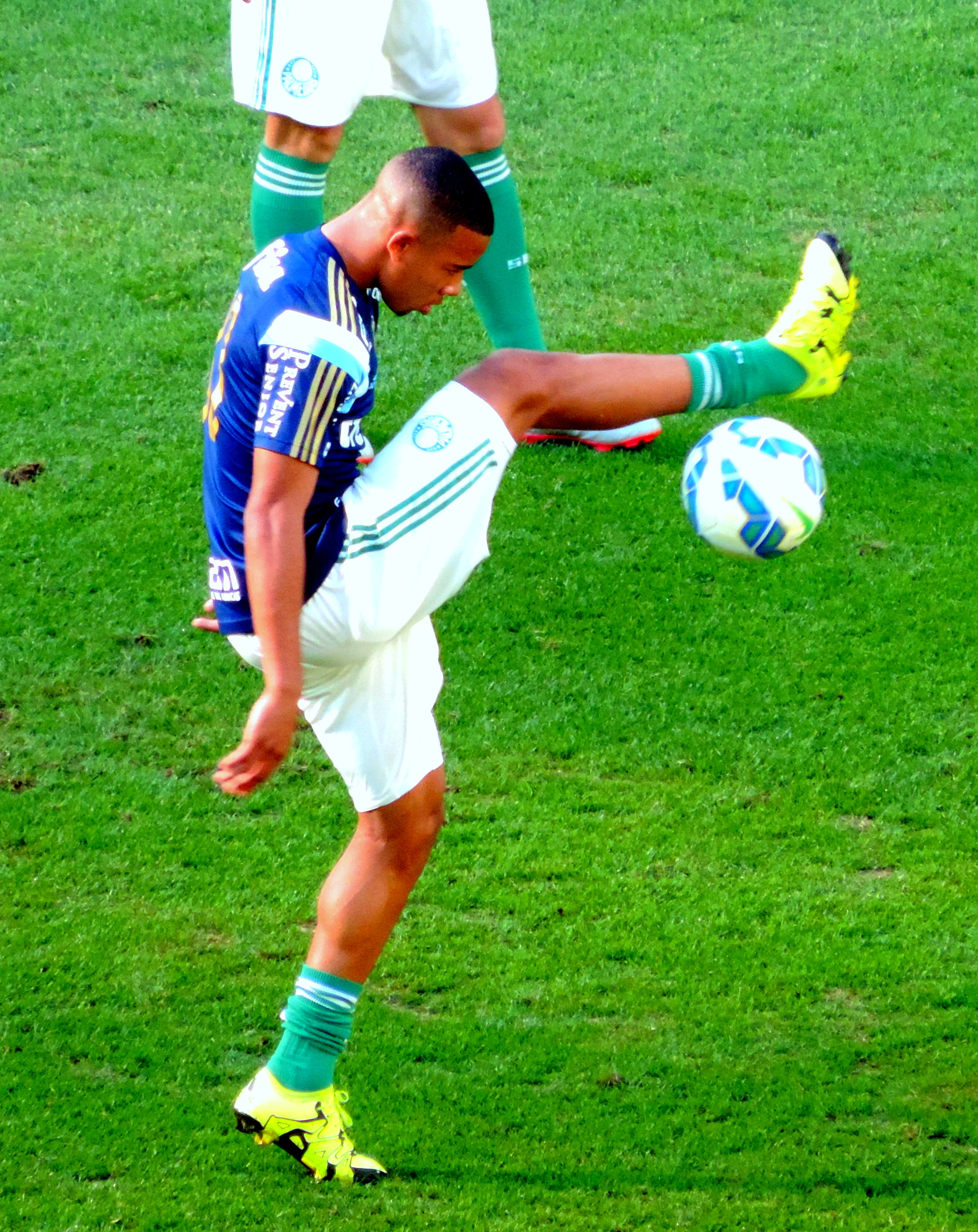
Jesus warming up for Palmeiras in 2015

On 1 July 2013, Jesus signed a youth contract with Palmeiras. He was also the club's top goalscorer during the year, scoring 54 goals in 48 matches.

In January 2014, after lengthy negotiations, Jesus signed a three-year contract for Palmeiras with an additional two, with his salary to increase from R$15,000 to four times as much in the fifth year; the fee to buy him out from his contract increased tenfold to R$30 million. However, the deal changed the balance of his economic rights from 75 to 25% in favour of Palmeiras, to 70–30% in favour of his agents.

Jesus scored 37 goals in 22 games for Palmeiras in the 2014 edition of the state under-17 championship, leading to offers from clubs throughout the country and abroad. He was first included in Palmeiras' squad for a senior match on 27 August 2014, remaining an unused substitute as they lost 0–1 at home to Atlético Mineiro in the first leg of the last 16 of the year's Copa do Brasil. He did not make any senior appearances during the campaign, as his side was seriously threatened with relegation; this decision, took by managers Ricardo Gareca and Dorival Júnior, was widely criticised by the supporters, who demanded a change for the youngster through a petition.

Jesus made his senior debut on 7 March 2015 in the season's Campeonato Paulista, replacing Leandro Pereira in the 73rd minute of a 1–0 win over CA Bragantino at Allianz Parque. He totalled eight appearances, all off the bench, as the Verdão lost on a penalty shoot-out in the final against Santos. Jesus made his first career start on 29 April in the second leg of the second round of the year's cup, a 1–1 draw at Sampaio Corrêa (6–2 aggregate). On 9 May, he made his first appearance in the Campeonato Brasileiro Série A, starting in a 2–2 home draw against Atlético Mineiro on the first day of the season.

Jesus' first professional goal came in the next round of the cup, away to ASA de Arapiraca on 15 July, the only goal of the two-legged tie. On 26 August, his two first-half strikes at the Estádio Governador Magalhães Pinto gave Palmeiras a 3–2 win over Cruzeiro (5–3 aggregate), putting them into the quarter-finals. Four days later he got his first league goals, starting and finishing a 3–2 win over Joinville Esporte Clube; the first goal came after 52 seconds. Jesus finished the campaign with four goals from 20 games, and his team defeated Santos to win the cup; he was also a starter in both legs of the finals, but being substituted before half-time due to a shoulder injury. He was elected Best Newcomer in the league.

On 4 February 2016, Jesus scored his first Paulista goal, opening a 2–2 home draw with São Bento in the second game of the season. Twelve days later, he scored his first goal in continental football, a 2–2 draw away to Uruguay's River Plate in the opening game of the group stage of that year's Copa Libertadores, after coming on at the interval in place of fellow youngster Erik Lima. Away to Rosario Central on 6 April, he scored twice in a 3–3 draw but was sent off for the first time in his career for fighting with Damián Musto; he later apologised for his misconduct.

In the opening game of the national season at home to Atlético Paranaense on 14 May, Jesus scored twice in the second half of a 4–0 win. He scored 12 goals as the team won their first national championship since 1994, and was named Bola de Ouro for player of the season.

=== Manchester City ===
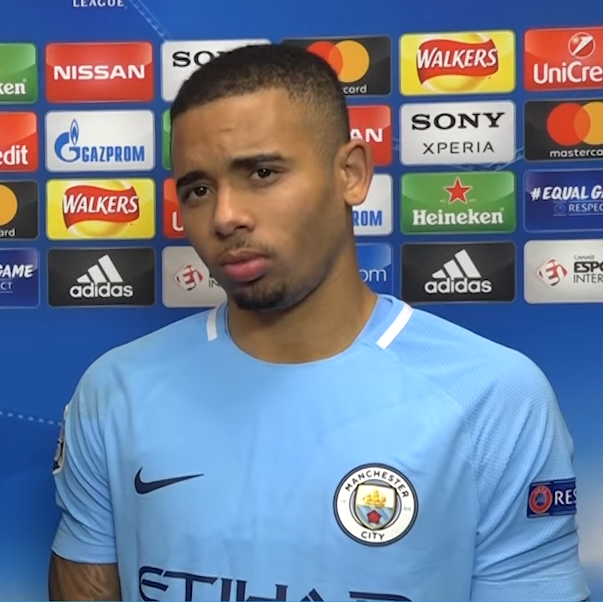
Jesus with Manchester City in 2018

On 3 August 2016, it was announced that Jesus would sign for Premier League club Manchester City in January 2017 on a contract until the summer of 2021. City paid a reported fee of £27 million/€33 million, plus add-ons. The transfer was fully completed on 19 January 2017.

Jesus made his first Premier League appearance on 21 January, coming on as an 82nd-minute substitute for Raheem Sterling in a 2–2 draw with Tottenham Hotspur at the City of Manchester Stadium. A week later, Jesus made his first appearance in Manchester City's starting XI, assisting a goal for Sterling in a 3–0 FA Cup win over Crystal Palace. On 1 February he made his first Premier League start in place of Sergio Agüero, and assisted Kevin De Bruyne in the 17th minute and then scored his first goal for the club in the 39th. With this, he became the first Manchester City player to have a goal and an assist in their first Premier League start, as well as only the third City player to be involved in two or more goals in their first Premier League start. In his fourth game (third league start) Jesus broke a metatarsal in his right foot and was expected to be out for the remainder of the 2016–17 Premier League season. However, he returned in April for the Manchester Derby, coming on as a substitute in a goalless draw. Jesus ended the 2016–17 season with seven goals and four assists in 11 games.

He scored his first Premier League goal of the 2017–18 season on 26 August, an equaliser in a 2–1 away win over Bournemouth, and added two more in a 5–0 win against Liverpool on 9 September. He had a 14-game goal drought between 18 November 2017 and 7 March 2018 that encompassed a knee medial ligament injury on New Year's Eve, and after breaking his duck in the Champions League loss to Basel he admitted that fear of getting injured was affecting his game. Jesus scored the last Premier League goal in the 2017–18 season against Southampton in the 94th minute, to secure City a league record 100 points. On 3 August 2018, Jesus signed a contract extension with Manchester City, to take him up until 2023. On 9 January 2019, Gabriel Jesus scored four goals for the first time in his career against Burton Albion in a 9–0 victory.

On 13 March 2019, Jesus scored once after coming on for Sergio Agüero in the 7–0 (10–2 aggregate) UEFA Champions League Round of 16 win over Schalke 04 and in doing so helped the club equal the record for the largest winning margin in the knockout phase of the competition. On 22 June, Jesus switched his jersey number from the number '33' shirt to the number '9' shirt.

On 7 August 2020, Jesus assisted and scored both goals respectively in a 2–1 win in the second leg of the round of 16 of the Champions League against Real Madrid, played at the Etihad Stadium behind closed doors following the Coronavirus outbreak. Both goals were scored after Jesus' pressing forced two errors from Real Madrid defender Raphael Varane, sealing Manchester City's spot in the quarter-finals. He was the only player to score in two separate games against Real Madrid in the 2019–20 football season, having also scored in the first leg in Madrid. This meant he reached 14 goals in only 22 Champions League games, a record bettered by only three non-European players.

On 23 April 2022, Jesus scored four goals in a 5–1 home win over Watford, sealing his first Premier League hat-trick.

=== Arsenal ===
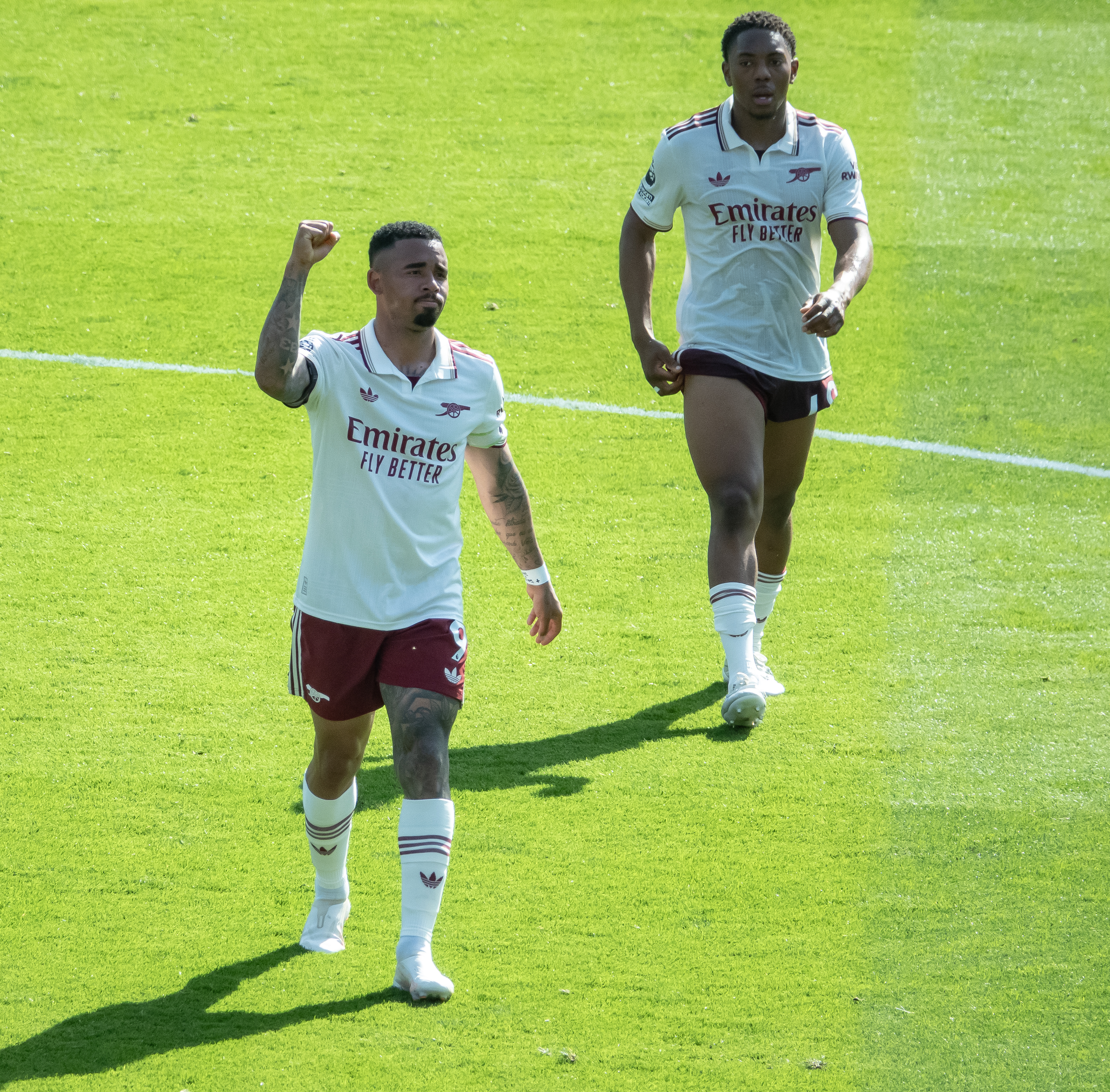
Jesus with Arsenal in 2026

On 4 July 2022, Jesus signed a long-term contract with Arsenal, and was assigned the number 9 shirt. The fee and the duration of the contract were undisclosed, yet it was reported the Brazilian signed a five-year contract on a £45 million deal. On 5 August, he made his club debut in a 2–0 away win against Crystal Palace in the Premier League. On 13 August, in his second match and first at the Emirates, he scored his first and second competitive goals for the club against Leicester City and also provided two assists in a 4–2 win. On 31 August, Jesus scored Arsenal's first goal in a 2–1 home win over Aston Villa, helping to maintain their 100% win rate from their opening five matches of the season. He was later voted as Arsenal's Player of the Month for August 2022. On 1 October, Jesus played in his first North London derby, and scored from close-range as the Gunners won 3–1 against rivals Tottenham Hotspur.

On 12 March 2023, he made his first appearance since recovering from the knee injury he sustained in the 2022 FIFA World Cup, replacing Leandro Trossard in the 77th minute of Arsenal's 3–0 win at Fulham. He scored twice in Arsenal's 4–1 win against Leeds United on 1 April, his first goals since recovering from his injury. He finished his first season with 11 goals and six assists in all competitions.

On 3 September 2023, Jesus scored his first goal of the 2023–24 season in a 3–1 victory over Manchester United, netting Arsenal's third late in stoppage time. On 20 September, Jesus scored in a 4–0 win against PSV Eindhoven in the Champions League, as Arsenal made their return to the competition after a six-year absence. He then scored in Arsenal's 2–1 loss to Lens and then again in Arsenal's 2–1 win against Sevilla to become the first Arsenal player to score three goals in his first three consecutive matches in the Champions League since Marouane Chamakh in 2011.

Jesus scored his first goal of the 2024–25 season on 30 October 2024, opening the scoring in Arsenal's 3–0 win at Preston in the fourth round of the Carabao Cup. On 18 December 2024, Jesus scored his first hat-trick for Arsenal, scoring all 3 goals in a 3–2 win over Crystal Palace in the Carabao Cup quarter-final. On 12 January 2025, he sustained an ACL injury during a FA Cup match against Manchester United which would sideline him for the rest of the season.

After missing most of the 2025 calendar year, Jesus made his return to playing on 10 December 2025 in a Champions League match against Club Brugge. On 30 December, he scored his first goal in over 11 months against Aston Villa, sealing a 4–1 home win for Arsenal. After the goal, he celebrated by taking off his shirt, revealing a white undershirt with the words "I belong to Jesus", referencing a celebration first done by Brazilian star Kaká. On 29 March 2026, Jesus replaced Ben White in the 82nd minute of his side's 2–0 defeat in the 2026 EFL Cup final against his former club Manchester City. On 24 May 2026, in the final league game of the season he opened the scoring in a 2–1 win away to Crystal Palace in what turned out to be his final appearance for the club, with the team receiving the 2025-26 Premier League trophy after the game and Jesus receiving his 5th Premier League winner's medal of his career. 6 days later he remained an substitute in the 2026 UEFA Champions League final as Arsenal were defeated in a penalty shootout by Paris Saint Germain following a 1–1 draw.

Jesus made a total of 123 appearances for Arsenal during his four seasons with the club, scoring 32 goals before departing on 1 September 2026.

=== Barcelona ===
On 1 September 2026, Jesus signed for La Liga club Barcelona on a three-year contract for an undisclosed fee reported to be €10 million, with a further €4.5 million in potential add-ons. On 9 September, he scored his first goal for the club after coming off the bench in a 5–1 victory over Feyenoord in the opening fixture of the UEFA Champions League league phase. A week later he scored his first league goal for Barcelona, again after coming off the bench, adding his side's sixth goal in a 7–2 win over Racing de Santander at Camp Nou.

== International career ==
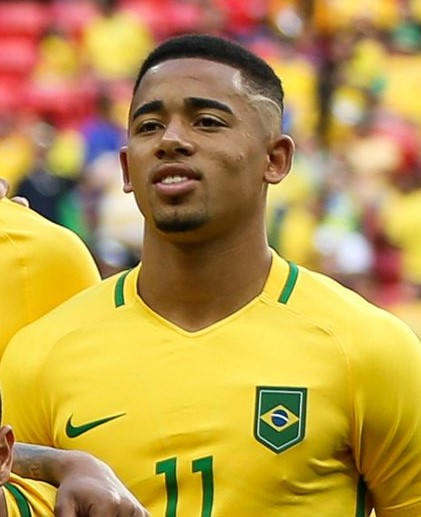
Jesus with the Brazil Olympic team in 2016

Jesus was part of the Brazil under-20 team that finished as runners-up at the 2015 U-20 World Cup in New Zealand. He scored their first goal of the tournament in a 4–2 win over Nigeria in New Plymouth, and converted as they advanced past Uruguay and Portugal on penalties.

In 2016, he was chosen in Dunga's provisional 40-man squad for the Copa América Centenario in the United States, and was considered as a replacement for the injured Douglas Costa in the final selection but missed out through the lack of a US visa. Later that year, he was one of five forward named in the squad for the team's hosting of the Olympic tournament. He scored once against Danish keeper Jeppe Højbjerg in their final group game against Denmark, an eventual 4–0 win, and in the semi-final against Honduras he added two more in a 6–0 victory. Jesus won the Olympics with his team against Germany in a penalty shoot-out, scoring one of the penalties.

Jesus made his debut for the senior team on 1 September 2016, in a 2018 FIFA World Cup qualification game against Ecuador in Quito. He started the match and scored twice, as Brazil won 3–0. Jesus was Brazil's highest scorer in the CONMEBOL World Cup qualifiers, with 7 goals in 10 matches. In May 2018, he was named in Tite's final 23-man squad for the 2018 FIFA World Cup in Russia. Jesus started all five games for Brazil at the tournament without scoring a goal.

In May 2019, Jesus was included in Brazil's 23-man squad for the 2019 Copa América on home soil. In the final against Peru on 7 July, at the Maracanã Stadium, he assisted the opening goal scored by Everton Soares, and later scored the match-winning goal late in the first half; however, he was sent off in the second half after collecting a second yellow card during the final following a collision with Carlos Zambrano. Brazil won the match 3–1 to win the title. In August 2019, Jesus was handed a 2-month international ban from CONMEBOL, due to his behaviour after being red carded in the 2019 Copa América Final.

In June 2021, he was included in Brazil's squad for the 2021 Copa América on home soil.

On 7 November 2022, Jesus was named in the squad for the 2022 FIFA World Cup. He was ruled out for the rest of the competition after picking up a right knee injury in the final group stage match against Cameroon.

== Style of play ==
As versatile forward, Jesus has been deployed as a center forward, as an out-and-out striker, as a false 9, as an inside forward, as a winger or as an attacking midfielder. Jesus is renowned for his technical skills, dribbling ability, creativity, movement, and work ethic. Former Brazilian striker Ronaldo has praised Jesus and touted him for future success with the Brazil national team. He has been praised by Manchester City's Pep Guardiola 'that of the players he has worked with, he is the ‘best striker/defender’'.

In October 2019, Jesus said he was open to switching to a winger role at Manchester City in the hope of getting more playing time, though he acknowledged that there was still intense competition in the team for a starting spot out on the wing.

Upon joining Arsenal, Jesus has been placed up-front as a striker in a 4–3–3 formation.

== Personal life ==
Gabriel Jesus came to England with his mother and older brother, along with two friends. He comes from a religious family and reportedly chose to wear the number 33 in tribute to the age at which Jesus Christ was crucified. He and Neymar got matching tattoos in August 2016 depicting a boy overlooking a favela.

Jesus' signature goal celebration, ‘Alô mãe’ ("Hello, mother" in English) where he makes a telephone gesture – has featured in the FIFA video games.

Jesus and his partner Raiane Lima have two children, a daughter and son, born in May 2022 and June 2025 respectively.

== Career statistics ==
=== Club ===
As of match played 3 November 2026

Appearances and goals by club, season and competition
Club	Season	League			State league (Note: Includes Campeonato Paulista)		National cup (Note: Includes Copa do Brasil, FA Cup, Copa del Rey)		League cup (Note: Includes EFL Cup)		Continental		Other		Total	
Club	Season	Division	Apps	Goals	Apps	Goals	Apps	Goals	Apps	Goals	Apps	Goals	Apps	Goals	Apps	Goals
Palmeiras	2015	Série A	20	4	8	0	9	3	—		—		—		37	7
Palmeiras	2016	Série A	27	12	12	5	2	0	—		5 (Note: Appearances in Copa Libertadores)	4	—		46	21
Palmeiras	Total		47	16	20	5	11	3	—		5	4	—		83	28
Manchester City	2016–17	Premier League	10	7	—		1	0	—		0	0	—		11	7
Manchester City	2017–18	Premier League	29	13	—		0	0	4	0	9 (Note: Appearances in UEFA Champions League)	4	—		42	17
Manchester City	2018–19	Premier League	29	7	—		6	5	5	5	6	4	1 (Note: Appearance in FA Community Shield)	0	47	21
Manchester City	2019–20	Premier League	34	14	—		4	2	6	1	8	6	1	0	53	23
Manchester City	2020–21	Premier League	29	9	—		5	2	1	1	7	2	—		42	14
Manchester City	2021–22	Premier League	28	8	—		4	1	1	0	8	4	0	0	41	13
Manchester City	Total		159	58	—		20	10	17	7	38	20	2	0	236	95
Arsenal	2022–23	Premier League	26	11	—		0	0	1	0	6 (Note: Appearances in UEFA Europa League)	0	—		33	11
Arsenal	2023–24	Premier League	27	4	—		0	0	1	0	8	4	0	0	36	8
Arsenal	2024–25	Premier League	17	3	—		1	0	4	4	5	0	—		27	7
Arsenal	2025–26	Premier League	14	3	—		4	1	3	0	6	2	—		27	6
Arsenal	Total		84	21	—		5	1	9	4	25	6	0	0	123	32
Barcelona	2026–27	La Liga	7	3	—		0	0	—		3	1	0	0	10	4
Career Total			297	98	20	5	36	16	26	11	71	31	2	0	452	159

=== International ===
As of match played 21 November 2023

Appearances and goals by national team and year
National team	Year	Apps	Goals
Brazil	2016	6	5
Brazil	2017	7	3
Brazil	2018	12	3
Brazil	2019	14	7
Brazil	2020	2	0
Brazil	2021	11	0
Brazil	2022	7	1
Brazil	2023	5	0
Total		64	19

As of match played 21 November 2023
Scores and results list Brazil's goal tally first, score column indicates score after each Jesus goal.

List of international goals scored by Gabriel Jesus
No.	Date	Venue	Cap	Opponent	Score	Result	Competition
1	1 September 2016	Estadio Olímpico Atahualpa, Quito, Ecuador	1	Ecuador	2–0	3–0	2018 FIFA World Cup qualification
2	1 September 2016	Estadio Olímpico Atahualpa, Quito, Ecuador	1	Ecuador	3–0	3–0	2018 FIFA World Cup qualification
3	6 October 2016	Arena das Dunas, Natal, Brazil	3	Bolivia	4–0	5–0	2018 FIFA World Cup qualification
4	11 October 2016	Estadio Metropolitano de Mérida, Mérida, Venezuela	4	Venezuela	1–0	2–0	2018 FIFA World Cup qualification
5	15 November 2016	Estadio Nacional, Lima, Peru	6	Peru	1–0	2–0	2018 FIFA World Cup qualification
6	10 October 2017	Allianz Parque, São Paulo, Brazil	11	Chile	2–0	3–0	2018 FIFA World Cup qualification
7	10 October 2017	Allianz Parque, São Paulo, Brazil	11	Chile	3–0	3–0	2018 FIFA World Cup qualification
8	10 November 2017	Stade Pierre-Mauroy, Villeneuve-d'Ascq, France	12	Japan	3–0	3–1	Friendly
9	27 March 2018	Olympiastadion, Berlin, Germany	15	Germany	1–0	1–0	Friendly
10	10 June 2018	Ernst-Happel-Stadion, Vienna, Austria	17	Austria	1–0	3–0	Friendly
11	12 October 2018	King Saud University Stadium, Riyadh, Saudi Arabia	23	Saudi Arabia	1–0	2–0	2018 Superclásico Championship
12	26 March 2019	Sinobo Stadium, Prague, Czech Republic	27	Czech Republic	2–1	3–1	Friendly
13	26 March 2019	Sinobo Stadium, Prague, Czech Republic	27	Czech Republic	3–1	3–1	Friendly
14	5 June 2019	Estádio Nacional Mané Garrincha, Brasília, Brazil	28	Qatar	2–0	2–0	Friendly
15	9 June 2019	Estádio Beira-Rio, Porto Alegre, Brazil	29	Honduras	1–0	7–0	Friendly
16	9 June 2019	Estádio Beira-Rio, Porto Alegre, Brazil	29	Honduras	4–0	7–0	Friendly
17	2 July 2019	Estádio Mineirão, Belo Horizonte, Brazil	34	Argentina	1–0	2–0	2019 Copa América
18	7 July 2019	Estádio do Maracanã, Rio de Janeiro, Brazil	35	Peru	2–1	3–1	2019 Copa América
19	2 June 2022	Seoul World Cup Stadium, Seoul, South Korea	55	South Korea	5–1	5–1	Friendly

== Honours ==
Palmeiras

- Campeonato Brasileiro Série A: 2016
- Copa do Brasil: 2015

Manchester City

- Premier League: 2017–18, 2018–19, 2020–21, 2021–22
- FA Cup: 2018–19
- EFL Cup: 2017–18, 2018-19, 2019–20, 2020–21
- FA Community Shield: 2018, 2019
- UEFA Champions League runner-up: 2020–21

Arsenal

- Premier League: 2025–26
- EFL Cup runner-up: 2025–26
- UEFA Champions League runner-up: 2025–26

Brazil U23

- Olympic Gold Medal: 2016

Brazil

- Copa América: 2019

Individual

- Campeonato Brasileiro Série A Best Newcomer: 2015
- Campeonato Brasileiro Série A Best Player: 2016
- Campeonato Brasileiro Série A Team of the Year: 2016
- Bola de Ouro: 2016
- Bola de Prata: 2016
- Troféu Mesa Redonda Best Player: 2016
- South American Footballer of the Year Silver Ball: 2016
- South American Team of the Year: 2016
