= Nilson (footballer, born 1991) =

Brazilian footballer

Personal information
- Full name: José Nilson dos Santos Silva
- Date of birth: 6 April 1991 (age 35)
- Place of birth: São Paulo, Brazil
- Height: 1.84 m (6 ft 1/2 in)
- Position: Forward

Team information
- Current team: Nakhon Si United
- Number: 91

Youth career
- 2008–2010: Portuguesa
- 2010–2011: Vasco da Gama

Senior career*
Years	Team	Apps	(Gls)
2010–2011	Vasco da Gama	4	(0)
2011	→ Criciúma (loan)	4	(0)
2012	→ Paraná (loan)	14	(3)
2013	→ Bragantino (loan)	6	(1)
2014	Boa	4	(1)
2014	Icasa	9	(4)
2015	São Bento	10	(2)
2015–2018	Cianorte	0	(0)
2015	→ Santos (loan)	16	(1)
2016	→ Ventforet Kofu (loan)	9	(1)
2016	→ América Mineiro (loan)	3	(0)
2017	→ Novorizontino (loan)	7	(1)
2017	→ São Bento (loan)	5	(0)
2018	→ Bangu (loan)	7	(1)
2019	Portuguesa-RJ	8	(2)
2019	Wilstermann	6	(1)
2020	Internacional de Limeira	2	(0)
2020–2021	Pegasus	18	(7)
2021	CSA	2	(0)
2022–2023	Ayutthaya United	27	(18)
2023	Nongbua Pitchaya	15	(9)
2024–	Nakhon Si United	2	(3)
- * Club domestic league appearances and goals as of 20 January 2024

José Nilson dos Santos Silva (born 6 April 1991), simply known as Nilson, is a Brazilian professional footballer who plays as a forward.

== Club career ==
Born in São Paulo, Nilson joined Vasco da Gama's youth setup in 2010, after starting it out at Portuguesa. He made his first team – and Série A – debut for the former on 6 June 2010, starting in a 0–4 away loss against Santos.

After being rarely used by Vasco, Nilson was loaned to Série B sides Criciúma, Paraná and Bragantino, but appeared sparingly for all clubs, and was released in December 2013.

On 28 February 2014, Nilson joined Boa Esporte permanently, but after again being a backup, moved to Icasa on 19 September. With the latter he scored a brace in a 3–1 home win against Náutico on 1 November.

On 16 January 2015, Nilson signed for São Bento. After featuring regularly for the club, he joined Cianorte on 16 April. On 19 May 2015 he was loaned to Santos until the end of the year.

Nilson's spell at Peixe was mainly associated to his ugly late miss in the 2015 Copa do Brasil Final against Palmeiras, where he sent the ball wide as the goal was empty. He was subsequently released by the club, and moved to Ventforet Kofu on 8 January 2016.

On 18 January 2017, Nilson signed for Novorizontino.

In November 2020, Nilson joined Hong Kong Premier League club Pegasus.

== Career statistics ==
As of 3 April 2018

Club	Season	League			State League		Cup		Continental		Other		Total	
Club	Season	Division	Apps	Goals	Apps	Goals	Apps	Goals	Apps	Goals	Apps	Goals	Apps	Goals
Vasco	2010	Série A	4	0	—		—		—		—		4	0
Criciúma	2011	Série B	4	0	—		—		—		—		4	0
Paraná	2012	Série B	8	1	—		6	2	—		—		14	3
Bragantino	2013	Série B	6	1	—		—		—		—		6	1
Boa Esporte	2014	Série B	4	1	0	0	—		—		—		4	1
Icasa	2014	Série B	9	4	—		—		—		3 (Note: Appearance(s) in Copa Fares Lopes)	0	12	4
São Bento	2015	Paulista	—		10	2	—		—		—		10	2
Cianorte	2015	Paranaense Série Prata	—		3	2	—		—		—		3	2
Santos	2015	Série A	13	1	—		3	0	—		—		16	1
Ventforet Kofu	2016	J1 League	6	0	—		3	1	—		—		9	1
América Mineiro	2016	Série A	3	0	—		—		—		—		3	0
Novorizontino	2017	Paulista	—		7	1	—		—		—		7	1
São Bento	2017	Série C	5	0	—		—		—		—		5	0
Bangu	2018	Carioca	—		7	1	—		—		—		7	1
Career total			62	8	27	6	12	3	0	0	3	0	104	17

== Honors ==
Icasa

- Copa Fares Lopes: 2014

Nilson finished the first leg of the 2022/23 Thai League 2 season as leading goal scorer with 10 goals.
