= 2015 Copa do Brasil =

- Official logo.

Tournament details
- Country: Brazil
- Dates: 8 February – 2 December
- Teams: 87

Final positions
- Champions: (São Paulo (state)) Palmeiras (3rd title)
- Runners-up: (São Paulo (state)) Santos

Tournament statistics
- Matches played: 158
- Goals scored: 417 (2.64 per match)
- Top goal scorer(s): (Brazil) Gabriel (8 goals)

The 2015 Copa do Brasil (officially the 2015 Copa Sadia do Brasil for sponsorship reasons) was the 27th edition of the Copa do Brasil football competition. The competition was contested by 87 teams, which qualified either by participating in their respective state championships (71), by the CBF Rankings (10), by qualifying for the 2015 Copa Libertadores (5) or having the best 2014 Série A record (excluding those qualified for 2015 Copa Libertadores). The latter 6 clubs entered the competition in the 4th stage. The best six teams of the 2014 Brazilian Championship eliminated until the third round qualified for the 2015 Copa Sudamericana.

The competition was won by Palmeiras, which earned their third title by defeating fellow São Paulo club Santos in a penalty shootout.

== Format ==
The competition was a single elimination knockout tournament featuring two-legged ties. In the first two rounds, if the away team won the first match by two or more goals, it progressed straight to the next round avoiding the second leg. The away goals rule was also used in the Copa do Brasil, but not for the finals. The winner qualifies for the 2016 Copa Libertadores.

== Qualified Teams ==
The teams (in bold) were qualified directly for the fourth stage (round of 16).

Association	Team (Berth)	Qualification method
(Acre (state)) Acre; 2 berths	Rio Branco	2014 Campeonato Acreano champions
(Acre (state)) Acre; 2 berths	Atlético Acreano	2014 Campeonato Acreano runners-up
(Alagoas) Alagoas; 3+1 berths	Coruripe	2014 Campeonato Alagoano champions
(Alagoas) Alagoas; 3+1 berths	CRB	2014 Campeonato Alagoano runners-up
(Alagoas) Alagoas; 3+1 berths	Murici	2014 Campeonato Alagoano first stage winners
(Alagoas) Alagoas; 3+1 berths	ASA	10th best placed team in 2015 CBF-Ranking not already qualified
(Amapá) Amapá; 1 berth	Santos	2014 Campeonato Amapaense champions
(Amazonas (Brazilian state)) Amazonas; 2 berths	Nacional	2014 Campeonato Amazonense champions
(Amazonas (Brazilian state)) Amazonas; 2 berths	Princesa do Solimões	2014 Campeonato Amazonense runners-up
(Bahia) Bahia; 3+1 berths	Bahia	2014 Campeonato Baiano champions
(Bahia) Bahia; 3+1 berths	Jacuipense	2014 Campeonato Baiano first stage runners-up
(Bahia) Bahia; 3+1 berths	Vitória da Conquista	2014 Copa Governador do Estado da Bahia champions
(Bahia) Bahia; 3+1 berths	Vitória	2nd best placed team in 2015 CBF-Ranking not already qualified
(Ceará) Ceará; 3 berths	Ceará	2014 Campeonato Cearense champions
(Ceará) Ceará; 3 berths	Fortaleza	2014 Campeonato Cearense first stage winners
(Ceará) Ceará; 3 berths	Icasa	2014 Copa Fares Lopes champions
(Federal District (Brazil)) Federal District; 2 berths	Luziânia	2014 Campeonato Brasiliense champions
(Federal District (Brazil)) Federal District; 2 berths	Brasília	2014 Campeonato Brasiliense runners-up
Espírito Santo; 2 berths	Estrela do Norte	2014 Campeonato Capixaba champions
Espírito Santo; 2 berths	Real Noroeste	2014 Copa Espírito Santo champions
(Goiás) Goiás; 3 berths	Atlético Goianiense	2014 Campeonato Goiano champions
(Goiás) Goiás; 3 berths	Goiás	2014 Campeonato Goiano runners-up
(Goiás) Goiás; 3 berths	Anapolina	2014 Campeonato Goiano 3rd place
(Maranhão) Maranhão; 2 berths	Sampaio Corrêa	2014 Campeonato Maranhense champions
(Maranhão) Maranhão; 2 berths	Moto Club	2014 Campeonato Maranhense runners-up
(Mato Grosso) Mato Grosso; 3 berths	Cuiabá	2014 Campeonato Mato-Grossense champions
(Mato Grosso) Mato Grosso; 3 berths	Luverdense	2014 Campeonato Mato-Grossense runners-up
(Mato Grosso) Mato Grosso; 3 berths	CEOV	2014 Campeonato Mato-Grossense 3rd place
Mato Grosso do Sul 2 berths	CENE	2014 Campeonato Sul-Mato-Grossense champions
Mato Grosso do Sul 2 berths	Águia Negra	2014 Campeonato Sul-Mato-Grossense runners-up
Minas Gerais; 4+2 berths	**Cruzeiro**	**2014 Campeonato Brasileiro Série A Champions**
Minas Gerais; 4+2 berths	**Atlético Mineiro**	**2014 Copa do Brasil champions**
Minas Gerais; 4+2 berths	América Mineiro	2014 Campeonato Mineiro 3rd place
Minas Gerais; 4+2 berths	Boa Esporte	2014 Campeonato Mineiro 4th place
Minas Gerais; 4+2 berths	Tupi	2014 Campeonato Mineiro 5th place
Minas Gerais; 4+2 berths	Villa Nova	2014 Campeonato Mineiro 6th place
(Pará) Pará; 3 berths	Remo	2014 Campeonato Paraense champions
(Pará) Pará; 3 berths	Paysandu	2014 Campeonato Paraense runners-up
(Pará) Pará; 3 berths	Independente Tucuruí	2014 Campeonato Paraense 3rd place
(Paraíba) Paraíba; 2 berths	Botafogo	2014 Campeonato Paraibano champions
(Paraíba) Paraíba; 2 berths	Campinense	2014 Campeonato Paraibano runners-up
(Paraná (state)) Paraná; 4+1 berths	Londrina	2014 Campeonato Paranaense champions
(Paraná (state)) Paraná; 4+1 berths	Maringá	2014 Campeonato Paranaense runners-up
(Paraná (state)) Paraná; 4+1 berths	Atlético Paranaense	2014 Campeonato Paranaense 3rd place
(Paraná (state)) Paraná; 4+1 berths	Coritiba	2014 Campeonato Paranaense 4th place
(Paraná (state)) Paraná; 4+1 berths	Paraná	8th best placed team in 2015 CBF-Ranking not already qualified
(Pernambuco) Pernambuco; 3 berths	Sport	2014 Campeonato Pernambucano champions
(Pernambuco) Pernambuco; 3 berths	Náutico	2014 Campeonato Pernambucano runners-up
(Pernambuco) Pernambuco; 3 berths	Salgueiro	2014 Campeonato Pernambucano first stage winners
(Piauí) Piauí; 2 berths	Ríver	2014 Campeonato Piauiense champions
(Piauí) Piauí; 2 berths	Piauí	2014 Campeonato Piauiense runners-up
(Rio de Janeiro (state)) Rio de Janeiro; 5+1+1 berths	**Fluminense**	**2014 Campeonato Brasileiro Série A 6th place**
(Rio de Janeiro (state)) Rio de Janeiro; 5+1+1 berths	Flamengo	2014 Campeonato Carioca champions
(Rio de Janeiro (state)) Rio de Janeiro; 5+1+1 berths	Vasco da Gama	2014 Campeonato Carioca runners-up
(Rio de Janeiro (state)) Rio de Janeiro; 5+1+1 berths	Cabofriense	2014 Campeonato Carioca 4th place
(Rio de Janeiro (state)) Rio de Janeiro; 5+1+1 berths	Boavista	2014 Campeonato Carioca 5th place
(Rio de Janeiro (state)) Rio de Janeiro; 5+1+1 berths	Madureira	2014 Copa Rio runners-up
(Rio de Janeiro (state)) Rio de Janeiro; 5+1+1 berths	Botafogo	Best placed team in 2015 CBF-Ranking not already qualified
(Rio Grande do Norte) Rio Grande do Norte; 3+1 berths	América de Natal	2014 Campeonato Potiguar champions
(Rio Grande do Norte) Rio Grande do Norte; 3+1 berths	Globo	2014 Campeonato Potiguar runners-up
(Rio Grande do Norte) Rio Grande do Norte; 3+1 berths	Alecrim	2014 Campeonato Potiguar 3rd place
(Rio Grande do Norte) Rio Grande do Norte; 3+1 berths	ABC	4th best placed team in 2015 CBF-Ranking not already qualified
(Rio Grande do Sul) Rio Grande do Sul; 4+1 berths	**Internacional**	**2014 Campeonato Brasileiro Série A 3rd place**
(Rio Grande do Sul) Rio Grande do Sul; 4+1 berths	Grêmio	2014 Campeonato Gaúcho runners-up
(Rio Grande do Sul) Rio Grande do Sul; 4+1 berths	Brasil de Pelotas	2014 Campeonato Gaúcho 3rd place
(Rio Grande do Sul) Rio Grande do Sul; 4+1 berths	Caxias	2014 Campeonato Gaúcho 4th place
(Rio Grande do Sul) Rio Grande do Sul; 4+1 berths	Lajeadense	2014 Copa FGF champions
(Rondônia) Rondônia; 1 berth	Vilhena	2014 Campeonato Rondoniense champions
(Roraima) Roraima; 1 berth	São Raimundo	2014 Campeonato Roraimense champions
(Santa Catarina (state)) Santa Catarina; 3+2 berths	Figueirense	2014 Campeonato Catarinense champions
(Santa Catarina (state)) Santa Catarina; 3+2 berths	Joinville	2014 Campeonato Catarinense runners-up
(Santa Catarina (state)) Santa Catarina; 3+2 berths	Chapecoense	2014 Copa Santa Catarina champions
(Santa Catarina (state)) Santa Catarina; 3+2 berths	Criciúma	6th best placed team in 2015 CBF-Ranking not already qualified
(Santa Catarina (state)) Santa Catarina; 3+2 berths	Avaí	7th best placed team in 2015 CBF-Ranking not already qualified
(São Paulo (state)) São Paulo; 5+2+3 berths	**São Paulo**	**2014 Campeonato Brasileiro Série A runners-up**
(São Paulo (state)) São Paulo; 5+2+3 berths	**Corinthians**	**2014 Campeonato Brasileiro Série A 4th place**
(São Paulo (state)) São Paulo; 5+2+3 berths	Ituano	2014 Campeonato Paulista champions
(São Paulo (state)) São Paulo; 5+2+3 berths	Santos	2014 Campeonato Paulista runners-up
(São Paulo (state)) São Paulo; 5+2+3 berths	Palmeiras	2014 Campeonato Paulista 3rd place
(São Paulo (state)) São Paulo; 5+2+3 berths	Capivariano	2014 Campeonato Paulista Série A2 champions
(São Paulo (state)) São Paulo; 5+2+3 berths	Santo André	2014 Copa Paulista champions
(São Paulo (state)) São Paulo; 5+2+3 berths	Ponte Preta	3rd best placed team in 2015 CBF-Ranking not already qualified
(São Paulo (state)) São Paulo; 5+2+3 berths	Portuguesa	5th best placed team in 2015 CBF-Ranking not already qualified
(São Paulo (state)) São Paulo; 5+2+3 berths	Bragantino	9th best placed team in 2015 CBF-Ranking not already qualified
(Sergipe) Sergipe; 2 berths	Confiança	2014 Campeonato Sergipano champions
(Sergipe) Sergipe; 2 berths	Amadense	2014 Copa Governo do Estado de Sergipe 3rd place
(Tocantins) Tocantins; 1 berth	Interporto	2014 Campeonato Tocantinense champions

== Draw ==
A draw by CBF for the first round was held on December 16, 2014. The 81 qualified teams were divided in eight pots (A-H) with 10 teams each. They were divided based on the CBF rankings and the matches were drawn from the respective pots: A x E; B x F; C x G; D x H. The lower ranked teams of each match hosted the first leg. Before the round of 16 there was another draw including the six teams directly qualified to the 4th round.

- CBF ranking shown in brackets.

Group A	Group B	Group C	Group D
(Rio de Janeiro (state)) Flamengo (3) (Rio Grande do Sul) Grêmio (4) (São Paulo (state)) Santos (5) (Paraná (state)) Atlético Paranaense (10) (Rio de Janeiro (state)) Botafogo (11) (Rio de Janeiro (state)) Vasco da Gama (12) (São Paulo (state)) Palmeiras (13) (Paraná (state)) Coritiba (14); Goiás (15); Bahia (16)	(Bahia) Vitória (17) (São Paulo (state)) Ponte Preta (18); Ceará (19) (Pernambuco) Sport (20) (Santa Catarina (state)) Figueirense (21) (Goiás) Atlético Goianiense (22) (Rio Grande do Norte) ABC (23) (São Paulo (state)) Portuguesa (24) (Santa Catarina (state)) Criciúma (25) (Pernambuco) Náutico (26)	(Santa Catarina (state)) Avaí (27) (Rio Grande do Norte) América de Natal (28) (Minas Gerais) América Mineiro (29) (Santa Catarina (state)) Chapecoense (30) (Paraná (state)) Paraná (31) (São Paulo (state)) Bragantino (32) (Santa Catarina (state)) Joinville (33) (Pará) Paysandu (34) (Alagoas) ASA (35) (Minas Gerais) Boa Esporte (37)	(Mato Grosso) Luverdense (38) (Ceará) Icasa (40) (Ceará) Fortaleza (41) (Maranhão) Sampaio Corrêa (42) (Alagoas) CRB (47) (Pernambuco) Salgueiro (49) (Rio Grande do Sul) Caxias (51) (Mato Grosso) Cuiabá (56) (Rio de Janeiro (state)) Madureira (58) (Minas Gerais) Tupi (59)
Group E	Group F	Group G	Group H
(São Paulo (state)) Santo André (62) (Amazonas (Brazilian state)) Nacional (63) (Acre (state)) Rio Branco (64) (Paraíba) Botafogo (65) (Pará) Remo (67) (Paraná (state)) Londrina (68) (Paraíba) Campinense (70) (Rio Grande do Sul) Brasil de Pelotas (72) (Bahia) Vitória da Conquista (76) (Minas Gerais) Villa Nova (78)	(Sergipe) Confiança (82) (Mato Grosso do Sul) CENE (84) (Amapá) Santos (88) (Rio de Janeiro (state)) Boavista (91) (Alagoas) Coruripe (92) (Amazonas (Brazilian state)) Princesa do Solimões (94) (Rondônia) Vilhena (95) (Goiás) Anapolina (105) (Acre (state)) Atlético Acreano (106) / (Espírito Santo) Real Noroeste (169) (Federal District (Brazil)) Brasília (109)	(Tocantins) Interporto (117) (Federal District (Brazil)) Luziânia (117) (Roraima) São Raimundo (124) (Maranhão) Moto Club (129) (Bahia) Jacuipense (130) (Rio Grande do Sul) Lajeadense (131) (Rio Grande do Norte) Globo (133) (Mato Grosso) CEOV (137) (São Paulo (state)) Ituano (139) (Mato Grosso do Sul) Águia Negra (141)	(Pará) Independente Tucuruí (146) (Rio de Janeiro (state)) Cabofriense (149) (Espírito Santo) Estrela do Norte (150); Ríver (152) (Paraná (state)) Maringá (152) (Rio Grande do Norte) Alecrim (161) (Alagoas) Murici (202) (São Paulo (state)) Capivariano (–) (Sergipe) Amadense (–); Piauí (–)

== Preliminary round ==
Team 1	Agg.	Team 2	1st leg	2nd leg
Real Noroeste (Espírito Santo)	4–2	(Acre (state)) Atlético Acreano	1–0	3–2

=== Preliminary match ===
February 8, 2015
19:30 UTC−02:00

Atlético Acreano (Acre (state))	0–1	(Espírito Santo) Real Noroeste
	Report	Sidevaldo 39'

Arena da Floresta, Rio Branco
Attendance: 481
Referee: Fledes Rodrigues Santos (Rondônia)

February 22, 2015
16:30 UTC−03:00

Real Noroeste (Espírito Santo)	3–2	(Acre (state)) Atlético Acreano
Stênio 14', 20', 40'		Ailton 50'; Jefferson Parrudo 69' (o.g.)

Estádio José Olímpio da Rocha, Águia Branca
Attendance: 778
Referee: Alexandre Vargas Tavares de Jesus (Rio de Janeiro)

Real Noroeste won 4–2 on aggregate.

== First round ==
Team 1	Agg.	Team 2	1st leg	2nd leg
Palmeiras (São Paulo (state))	4–1	(Bahia) Vitória da Conquista	4–1	–
Sampaio Corrêa (Maranhão)	6–4	(Espírito Santo) Estrela do Norte	2–3	4–1
Vitória (Bahia)	3–2	(Goiás) Anapolina	2–1	1–1
ASA (Alagoas)	3–1	(Roraima) São Raimundo	3–1	–
Botafogo (Rio de Janeiro (state))	6–4	(Paraíba) Botafogo	2–2	4–2
Caxias (Rio Grande do Sul)	0–3	(São Paulo (state)) Capivariano	0–3	0–0
Figueirense (Santa Catarina (state))	4–3	(Amazonas (Brazilian state)) Princesa do Solimões	2–2	2–1
Avaí (Santa Catarina (state))	3–1	(Mato Grosso) CEOV	0–0	3–1
Santos (São Paulo (state))	2–0	(Paraná (state)) Londrina	1–0	1–0
Madureira (Rio de Janeiro (state))	3–3 (a)	(Paraná (state)) Maringá	0–2	3–1
Sport (Pernambuco)	6–2	(Mato Grosso do Sul) CENE	2–1	4–1
Chapecoense (Santa Catarina (state))	5–2	(Tocantins) Interporto	5–2	−
Flamengo (Rio de Janeiro (state))	4–1	(Rio Grande do Sul) Brasil de Pelotas	2–1	2–0
Salgueiro (Pernambuco)	5–1	Piauí	5–1	−
Náutico (Pernambuco)	3–0	(Federal District (Brazil)) Brasília	1–0	2–0
Paraná (Paraná (state))	1–1 (4–5 p)	(Bahia) Jacuipense	1–0	0–1
Goiás	2–0	(São Paulo (state)) Santo André	1–0	1–0
Icasa (Ceará)	2–5	(Pará) Independente Tucuruí	0–5	2–0
Portuguesa (São Paulo (state))	3–1	(Amapá) Santos	3–1	−
Joinville (Santa Catarina (state))	1–3	(São Paulo (state)) Ituano	0–3	1–0
Coritiba (Paraná (state))	3–0	(Minas Gerais) Villa Nova	3–0	−
Fortaleza (Ceará)	3–1	(Piauí) Ríver	1–0	2–1
Ponte Preta (São Paulo (state))	4–1	(Rondônia) Vilhena	1–1	3–0
Boa (Minas Gerais)	2–2 (3–4 p)	(Maranhão) Moto Club	1–1	1–1
Vasco da Gama (Rio de Janeiro (state))	5–3	(Acre (state)) Rio Branco	2–1	3–2
Cuiabá (Mato Grosso)	4–3	(Alagoas) Murici	2–3	2–0
Atlético Goianiense (Goiás)	3–1	(Alagoas) Coruripe	1–1	2–0
América de Natal (Rio Grande do Norte)	5–1	(Rio Grande do Norte) Globo	5–1	−
Atlético Paranaense (Paraná (state))	2–2 (5–4 p)	(Pará) Remo	1–1	1–1
Tupi (Minas Gerais)	2–0	(Rio Grande do Norte) Alecrim	2–0	−
Ceará	1–0	(Sergipe) Confiança	0–0	1–0
América Mineiro (Minas Gerais)	3–0	(Federal District (Brazil)) Luziânia	3–0	−
Grêmio (Rio Grande do Sul)	4–1	(Paraíba) Campinense	2–1	2–0
CRB (Alagoas)	3–1	(Sergipe) Amadense	2–1	1–0
Criciúma (Santa Catarina (state))	4–1	(Espírito Santo) Real Noroeste	4–1	−
Bragantino (São Paulo (state))	2–2 (a)	(Rio Grande do Sul) Lajeadense	1–2	1–0
Bahia	3–2	(Amazonas (Brazilian state)) Nacional	0–0	3–2
Luverdense (Mato Grosso)	2–1	(Rio de Janeiro (state)) Cabofriense	1–1	1–0
ABC (Rio Grande do Norte)	3–0	(Rio de Janeiro (state)) Boavista	1–0	2–0
Paysandu (Pará)	4–2	(Mato Grosso do Sul) Águia Negra	2–2	2–0

== Second round ==
Team 1	Agg.	Team 2	1st leg	2nd leg
Palmeiras (São Paulo (state))	6–2	(Maranhão) Sampaio Corrêa	1–1	5–1
Vitória (Bahia)	3–3 (a)	(Alagoas) ASA	1–1	2–2
Botafogo (Rio de Janeiro (state))	5–1	(São Paulo (state)) Capivariano	2–1	3–0
Figueirense (Santa Catarina (state))	2–1	(Santa Catarina (state)) Avaí	0–1	2–0
Santos (São Paulo (state))	3–2	(Paraná (state)) Maringá	2–2	1–0
Sport (Pernambuco)	2–2 (4–2 p)	(Santa Catarina (state)) Chapecoense	0–2	2–0
Flamengo (Rio de Janeiro (state))	2–0	(Pernambuco) Salgueiro	2–0	−
Náutico (Pernambuco)	2–0	(Bahia) Jacuipense	2–0	−
Goiás	3–1	(Pará) Independente Tucuruí	0−1	3–0
Portuguesa (São Paulo (state))	2−3	(São Paulo (state)) Ituano	1−1	1−2
Coritiba (Paraná (state))	3–3 (11–10 p)	(Ceará) Fortaleza	1–2	2–1
Ponte Preta (São Paulo (state))	6−2	(Maranhão) Moto Club	2–1	4−1
Vasco da Gama (Rio de Janeiro (state))	1–1 (a)	(Mato Grosso) Cuiabá	1–1	0−0
Atlético Goianiense (Goiás)	3–4	(Rio Grande do Norte) América de Natal	2–4	1–0
Atlético Paranaense (Paraná (state))	2–2 (a)	(Minas Gerais) Tupi	0−1	2–1
Ceará	4–1	(Minas Gerais) América Mineiro	1–1	3–0
Grêmio (Rio Grande do Sul)	3–1	(Alagoas) CRB	3–1	−
Criciúma (Santa Catarina (state))	3–0	(São Paulo (state)) Bragantino	3–0	−
Bahia	3–1	(Mato Grosso) Luverdense	0–0	3–1
ABC (Rio Grande do Norte)	1–3	(Pará) Paysandu	0–1	1–2

== Third round ==
Team 1	Agg.	Team 2	1st leg	2nd leg
ASA (Alagoas)	0–1	(São Paulo (state)) Palmeiras	0–0	0–1
Botafogo (Rio de Janeiro (state))	2–3	(Santa Catarina (state)) Figueirense	2–2	0–1
Santos (São Paulo (state))	4–3	(Pernambuco) Sport	1–2	3–1
Náutico (Pernambuco)	1–3	(Rio de Janeiro (state)) Flamengo	1–1	0–2
Goiás	3–3 (a)	(São Paulo (state)) Ituano	0–2	3–1
Ponte Preta (São Paulo (state))	3–3 (1–3 p)	(Paraná (state)) Coritiba	1–2	2–1
América de Natal (Rio Grande do Norte)	3–6	(Rio de Janeiro (state)) Vasco da Gama	1–3	2–3
Tupi (Minas Gerais)	1–2	Ceará	0–0	1–2
Criciúma (Santa Catarina (state))	1–1 (3–4 p)	(Rio Grande do Sul) Grêmio	1–0	0–1
Bahia	2–3	(Pará) Paysandu	0–3	2–0

== Copa Sudamericana qualification ==
The best six teams eliminated before the round of 16 with the best 2014 Série A or 2014 Série B record (excluding those directly qualified for the Round of 16) qualified for 2015 Copa Sudamericana.

Pos	Team	Final status	2014 season
1	Grêmio	Round of 16	7th (Série A)
2	Atlético Paranaense	Eliminated (second round)	8th (Série A)
3	Santos	Round of 16	9th (Série A)
4	Flamengo	Round of 16	10th (Série A)
5	Sport	Eliminated (third round)	11th (Série A)
6	Goiás	Eliminated (third round)	12th (Série A)
7	Figueirense	Round of 16	13th (Série A)
8	Coritiba	Round of 16	14th (Série A)
9	Chapecoense	Eliminated (second round)	15th (Série A)
10	Palmeiras	Round of 16	16th (Série A)
11	Joinville	Eliminated (first round)	1st (Série B)
12	Ponte Preta	Eliminated (third round)	2nd (Série B)
13	Vasco da Gama	Round of 16	3rd (Série B)
14	Avaí	Eliminated (second round)	4th (Série B)
15	Vitória	Eliminated (second round)	17th (Série A)
16	Bahia	Eliminated (third round)	18th (Série A)
17	Botafogo	Eliminated (third round)	19th (Série A)
18	Criciúma	Eliminated (third round)	20th (Série A)

Key to colors on the table
Qualified
Not qualified

1. 2015 Copa do Nordeste:
  - As champions of the 2015 Copa do Nordeste, Ceará were qualified for 2015 Copa Sudamericana. They qualified also for 2015 Copa do Brasil round of 16 losing their Copa Sudamericana berth. For this reason, Bahia qualified for the 2015 Copa Sudamericana as 2015 Copa do Nordeste best team (runners-up) eliminated before round of 16.

== Knockout stages ==
The draw for the knockout stages was held by CBF on 4 August 2015. The 16 qualified teams were divided in two pots. Teams from pot 1 were the six teams directly qualified to the round of 16, the five teams that competed at the 2015 Copa Libertadores and the best placed team in the 2014 Brazilian Série A not taking part in the 2015 Copa Libertadores, plus the two highest CBF ranked teams qualified via the third round. Pot 2 was composed of the other teams that qualified through the third round. Each pot was divided into 4 pairs according to the CBF ranking. For the remaining stages of the tournament another draw was held on 31 August 2015.

=== Seeding ===
Pot 1	Pot 2
(Minas Gerais) Cruzeiro (1); (São Paulo (state)) Corinthians (2); (Rio de Janeiro (state)) Flamengo (3); (Rio Grande do Sul) Grêmio (4); (Minas Gerais) Atlético Mineiro (6); (São Paulo (state)) São Paulo (7); (Rio de Janeiro (state)) Fluminense (8); (Rio Grande do Sul) Internacional (9)	(São Paulo (state)) Santos (5); (Rio de Janeiro (state)) Vasco da Gama (12); (São Paulo (state)) Palmeiras (13); (Paraná (state)) Coritiba (14); Ceará (19); (Santa Catarina (state)) Figueirense (21); (Pará) Paysandu (34); (São Paulo (state)) Ituano (139)

=== Bracket ===
Round of 16
(São Paulo (state)) São Paulo	1	3	4
Ceará	2	0	2
(Rio de Janeiro (state)) Flamengo	0	1	1
(Rio de Janeiro (state)) Vasco da Gama	1	1	2
(Minas Gerais) Atlético Mineiro	1	1	2
(Santa Catarina (state)) Figueirense	1	2	3
(São Paulo (state)) Santos	2	2	4
(São Paulo (state)) Corinthians	0	1	1
(Rio de Janeiro (state)) Fluminense	2	2	4
(Pará) Paysandu	1	1	2
(Paraná (state)) Coritiba	0	1	1
(Rio Grande do Sul) Grêmio	1	3	4
(Rio Grande do Sul) Internacional	2	2	4
(São Paulo (state)) Ituano	0	1	1
(São Paulo (state)) Palmeiras	2	3	5
(Minas Gerais) Cruzeiro	1	2	3

Quarterfinals
(São Paulo (state)) São Paulo	3	1	4
(Rio de Janeiro (state)) Vasco da Gama	0	1	1
(Santa Catarina (state)) Figueirense	0	2	2
(São Paulo (state)) Santos	1	3	4
(Rio de Janeiro (state)) Fluminense (a)	0	1	1
(Rio Grande do Sul) Grêmio	0	1	1
(Rio Grande do Sul) Internacional	1	2	3
(São Paulo (state)) Palmeiras	1	3	4

Semifinals
(São Paulo (state)) São Paulo	1	1	2
(São Paulo (state)) Santos	3	3	6
(Rio de Janeiro (state)) Fluminense	2	1	3 (1)
(São Paulo (state)) Palmeiras (p)	1	2	3 (4)

Finals
(São Paulo (state)) Santos	1	1	2 (3)
(São Paulo (state)) Palmeiras (p)	0	2	2 (4)

=== Round of 16 ===
Team 1	Agg.	Team 2	1st leg	2nd leg
Ituano (São Paulo (state))	1–4	(Rio Grande do Sul) Internacional	0–2	1–2
Ceará	2–4	(São Paulo (state)) São Paulo	2–1	0–3
Cruzeiro (Minas Gerais)	3–5	(São Paulo (state)) Palmeiras	1–2	2–3
Vasco da Gama (Rio de Janeiro (state))	2–1	(Rio de Janeiro (state)) Flamengo	1–0	1–1
Paysandu (Pará)	2–4	(Rio de Janeiro (state)) Fluminense	1–2	1–2
Grêmio (Rio Grande do Sul)	4–1	(Paraná (state)) Coritiba	1–0	3–1
Figueirense (Santa Catarina (state))	3–2	(Minas Gerais) Atlético Mineiro	1–1	2–1
Corinthians (São Paulo (state))	1–4	(São Paulo (state)) Santos	0–2	1–2

=== Quarterfinals ===
Team 1	Agg.	Team 2	1st leg	2nd leg
Vasco da Gama (Rio de Janeiro (state))	1–4	(São Paulo (state)) São Paulo	0–3	1–1
Santos (São Paulo (state))	4–2	(Santa Catarina (state)) Figueirense	1–0	3–2
Palmeiras (São Paulo (state))	4–3	(Rio Grande do Sul) Internacional	1–1	3–2
Grêmio (Rio Grande do Sul)	1–1 (a)	(Rio de Janeiro (state)) Fluminense	0–0	1–1

=== Semifinals ===
Team 1	Agg.	Team 2	1st leg	2nd leg
Santos (São Paulo (state))	6–2	(São Paulo (state)) São Paulo	3–1	3–1
Palmeiras (São Paulo (state))	3–3 (4–1 p)	(Rio de Janeiro (state)) Fluminense	1–2	2–1

=== Finals ===
November 25, 2015
22:00 DST: UTC−02:00

Santos (São Paulo (state))	1–0	(São Paulo (state)) Palmeiras
Gabriel 78'	Report

Vila Belmiro, Santos
Attendance: 14,116
Referee: Luiz Flávio de Oliveira (São Paulo) (replaced by Marcelo Aparecido de Souza (SP) - 67')

December 2, 2015
22:00 DST: UTC−02:00

Palmeiras (São Paulo (state))	2–1	(São Paulo (state)) Santos
Dudu 56', 84'	Report	Ricardo Oliveira 86'
Penalties
Zé Roberto (penalty scored); Rafael Marques (penalty missed); Jackson (penalty scored); Cristaldo (penalty scored); Fernando Prass (penalty scored)	4–3	(penalty missed) Marquinhos Gabriel; (penalty missed) Gustavo Henrique; (penalty scored) Geuvânio; (penalty scored) Lucas Lima; (penalty scored) Ricardo Oliveira

Allianz Parque, São Paulo
Attendance: 39,660
Referee: Héber Lopes (Santa Catarina)

2015 Copa do Brasil
Champions

Palmeiras
3rd title

== Top goalscorers ==
Rank	Player	Team	Goals
1	(Brazil) Gabriel	(São Paulo (state)) Santos	8
2	(Brazil) Ricardo Oliveira	(São Paulo (state)) Santos	6
2	(Brazil) Ronaldo	(São Paulo (state)) Ituano	6
4	(Brazil) Alexandre Pato	(São Paulo (state)) São Paulo	5
4	(Brazil) Marquinhos Gabriel	(São Paulo (state)) Santos	5
6	(Brazil) Cesinha	(São Paulo (state)) Ponte Preta	4
6	(Brazil) Robert	(Maranhão) Sampaio Corrêa	4
6	(Brazil) Yago Pikachu	(Pará) Paysandu	4
6	(Brazil) Zé Roberto	(São Paulo (state)) Palmeiras	4
