= Marco Damasceno =

Brazilian footballer

Personal information
- Full name: Marco Gabriel Damasceno Alves
- Date of birth: 11 April 1996 (age 30)
- Place of birth: Brasília, DF, Brazil
- Height: 1.72 m (5 ft 8 in)
- Position: Attacking midfielder

Team information
- Current team: Caldense

Youth career
- 2011–2015: Atlético Paranaense

Senior career*
Years	Team	Apps	(Gls)
2014–2016	Atlético Paranaense	12	(0)
2016	→ Sampaio Corrêa (loan)	6	(0)
2016	Internacional	0	(0)
2016	Londrina	0	(0)
2017	Audax	3	(0)
2017–2018	Ferroviária	7	(0)
2018	Audax	0	(0)
2019	Capital	5	(0)
2019	Real		
2019	Sobradinho		
2019	São Joseense		
2020–	Caldense	11	(3)
- * Club domestic league appearances and goals as of 20:44, 3 November 2020 (UTC)

Marco Gabriel Damasceno Alves (born 11 April 1996), known as Marco Damasceno, is a Brazilian footballer who plays as an attacking midfielder for Caldense.

== Career ==
Born in Brasília, Distrito Federal, Damasceno joined Atlético Paranaense's youth setup in 2011, after representing a Santos youth school in his hometown. He also had trials at Braga and Real Madrid in 2010, but nothing came of it.

Damasceno made his first team – and Série A – debut on 20 September 2014, coming on as a second-half substitute for fellow youth graduate Marcos Guilherme in a 1–0 home loss against Internacional.
