= Wesley (footballer, born 1990) =

Brazilian footballer

Personal information
- Full name: Wesley Pacheco Gomes
- Date of birth: 24 April 1990 (age 36)
- Place of birth: Sertãozinho, Brazil
- Height: 1.78 m (5 ft 10 in)
- Position: Forward

Youth career
- 2008–2010: Grêmio

Senior career*
Years	Team	Apps	(Gls)
2011–2014	Grêmio	3	(0)
2012	→ Novo Hamburgo (loan)	8	(0)
2013	→ Pelotas (loan)	8	(0)
2014	→ Red Bull Brasil (loan)	9	(0)
2014	Novo Hamburgo	0	(0)
2015	Cruzeiro-RS	14	(5)
2015–2016	Goiás	12	(1)
2016	Grêmio Novorizontino	7	(1)
2016	Aimoré	0	(0)
2017	Cascavel	13	(1)
2017	Boa Esporte	28	(2)
2018	Veranópolis	12	(1)
2018	Caxias	12	(6)
2018–2019	América Mineiro	5	(0)
2019	Paysandu	10	(0)
2020	Brasil de Pelotas	18	(2)
2021	Esportivo	8	(1)
2021	Cruzeiro-RS	21	(8)
2022–2023	Aimoré	42	(11)
2023	Marília Atlético Clube	4	(0)
- * Club domestic league appearances and goals as of 3 September 2023

Wesley Pacheco Gomes (born 24 April 1990), known as Wesley, is a Brazilian footballer who plays as a forward.

== Club career ==
Wesley was born in Sertãozinho, São Paulo, and graduated with Grêmio. He made his senior debuts for the club in 2011, appearing in that year's Campeonato Gaúcho.

On 3 February 2012 Wesley was loaned to Novo Hamburgo. In December he returned to Grêmio, but moved to Pelotas also in a temporary deal.

After another loan stint at Red Bull Brasil, Wesley left Grêmio in April 2014, after his contract expired. He subsequently returned to Novo Hamburgo, and in November signed for Cruzeiro-RS.

On 14 April 2015 Wesley signed with Goiás. He made his Série A debut on 10 May, starting in a 0–0 away draw against Vasco.
