= Jonatan Cristaldo =

Argentine footballer

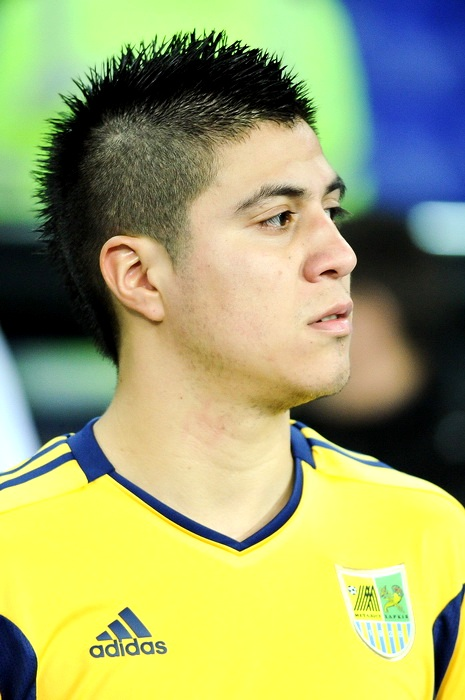
- Cristaldo with Metalist Kharkiv in 2011

Personal information
- Full name: Jonatan Ezequiel Cristaldo
- Date of birth: 5 March 1989 (age 37)
- Place of birth: Ingeniero Budge, Argentina
- Height: 1.75 m (5 ft 9 in)
- Position: Striker

Team information
- Current team: Oriente Petrolero
- Number: 33

Youth career
- 2004–2006: Vélez Sarsfield

Senior career*
Years	Team	Apps	(Gls)
2006–2011	Vélez Sarsfield	85	(21)
2011–2014	Metalist Kharkiv	62	(27)
2013–2014	→ Bologna (loan)	26	(4)
2014–2016	Palmeiras	43	(9)
2016–2017	Cruz Azul	10	(2)
2017	→ Monterrey (loan)	4	(1)
2017	Vélez Sarsfield	5	(0)
2018–2021	Racing Club	40	(8)
2021	Newell's Old Boys	20	(3)
2022	Independiente Petrolero	22	(12)
2023	Oriente Petrolero	28	(7)
2024	Independiente Petrolero	12	(2)
2024	São Bernardo	4	(0)
2025–	Oriente Petrolero	17	(6)

International career^{‡}
2009	Argentina U20	9	(2)
2011	Argentina	1	(0)
- * Club domestic league appearances and goals as of 30 December 2025 ‡ National team caps and goals as of 7 June 2011

Jonatan Ezequiel Cristaldo (born 5 March 1989), nicknamed "Churry", is an Argentine professional footballer who plays as a striker for Bolivian club Oriente Petrolero.

== Club career ==
Cristaldo made his debut for Vélez Sársfield in a 0–2 home defeat to Rosario Central on 22 April 2007 in the 2007 Clausura. He scored his first goal also in a home game against Rosario Central (2–1 victory) in the 2008 Clausura.

Cristaldo won his first Argentine league championship with Vélez in the 2009 Clausura. During the championship, he was at first a substitute for the striking partners Hernán Rodrigo López and Joaquín Larrivey; however as of the 11th fixture, he became a regular starter along López in the attack. Nonetheless, a meniscus injury suffered in the penultimate fixture against Lanús left him out of the final game against runners-up Huracán, in which the tournament was decided. In total, the striker played 14 games and scored 4 goals during the competition.

In the following semester, Cristaldo started by scoring in Vélez' 1–0 home victory over Boca Juniors in the first round of the 2009 Copa Sudamericana, securing his team's qualification. He was also, along Maximiliano Moralez, his team's top scorer on that semester's league championship (2009 Apertura) with 5 goals in 13 games. One of his goals was scored with a bicycle kick from outside the penalty area (6th fixture 2–0 win over Huracán).

Cristaldo started 2010 suffering an injury that left him out of most of Vélez' Clausura tournament and Copa Libertadores games. He only played 4 league games in the semester, all of them coming on from the bench. In the second semester, he was mostly a substitute for the striker partnership of Juan Manuel Martínez and Santiago Silva (who together scored 21 goals). However, he saw action regularly, coming on as a substitute in 16 of the 19 games of the tournament (he also played one as a starter). He ended the semester with 5 league goals, and one more in the Copa Sudamericana.

In January 2011, Cristaldo joined Ukrainian FC Metalist Kharkiv, that bought 80% of the player's transfer rights from Vélez Sársfield for a US$5 million fee.

In August 2014, Cristaldo joined Brazilian side Palmeiras, signing a four-year deal.

In June 2016, Mexican side Cruz Azul confirmed the signing of Cristaldo from Palmeiras for a fee that was reported to be in the region of US$3 million.

After a six-month loan spell with Monterrey, Cristaldo returned to play for Vélez Sarsfield on a free transfer, for the 2017–18 Argentine Primera División.

== International career ==
In January 2009, Cristaldo was selected to represent the Argentina national under-20 football team at the South American Youth Championship. During the first round, he was a starter in the attack along Andrés Ríos, but lost his place in the final round. Argentina did not qualify for the World Cup, and Cristaldo ended the tournament with 8 games and 2 goals.

One year later, in January 2010, the striker was selected by Diego Maradona, coach of the Argentina national team, to play a friendly match against Costa Rica, in a squad formed by Argentine league players. Cristaldo was an unused substitute in the game.

New manager Sergio Batista handed Cristaldo his full international debut in the 2–1 defeat against Poland in June 2011.

=== International appearances and goals ===
#	Date	Venue	Opponent	Final score	Goal	Result	Competition
1.	5 June 2011	Warsaw, Poland	Poland	2–1	0	Lost	Friendly

== Career statistics ==
As of match played 20 January 2016

Club	Season	League		National Cup		Continental		State League		Other		Total	
Club	Season	Apps	Goals	Apps	Goals	Apps	Goals	Apps	Goals	Apps	Goals	Apps	Goals
Palmeiras	2014	17	2	2	0	–		0	0	0	0	19	2
Palmeiras	2015	22	6	9	3	–		13	3	1	1	45	13
Palmeiras	2016	3	1	0	0	2	1	5	2	0	0	10	4
Palmeiras	Total	42	9	11	3	0	0	18	5	0	0	72	19

== Honours ==
Vélez Sársfield

- Argentine Primera División (1): 2009 Clausura

Palmeiras

- Copa do Brasil: 2015
- Campeonato Brasileiro A: 2016
