= Rafhael Lucas =

Brazilian footballer

Personal information
- Full name: Rafhael Lucas Oliveira da Silva
- Date of birth: 30 November 1992 (age 33)
- Place of birth: Curitiba, Brazil
- Height: 1.74 m (5 ft 8 1/2 in)
- Position: Forward

Team information
- Current team: Operário

Youth career
- 2002–2012: Coritiba

Senior career*
Years	Team	Apps	(Gls)
2015–2018	Coritiba	52	(17)
2012	→ São Carlos (loan)	7	(1)
2012	→ Arapongas (loan)	5	(3)
2014	→ Atlético Sorocaba (loan)	0	(0)
2016	→ Goiás (loan)	30	(10)
2016	→ Fortaleza (loan)	2	(0)
2017	→ Mirassol (loan)	12	(1)
2017	→ Paraná Clube (loan)	11	(1)
2018	→ Inter de Lages (loan)	15	(4)
2018–2019	Jaguares de Córdoba	23	(7)
2020	Anapolina	6	(5)
2020	Santo André	3	(0)
2020	Vila Nova	22	(4)
2021	Coimbra	10	(1)
2021	Manaus	19	(4)
2022	Athletic-MG	12	(7)
2022	Volta Redonda	28	(9)
2022	North Esporte Clube	6	(2)
2023–	Operário	17	(2)
- * Club domestic league appearances and goals as of 20:46, 18 February 2024 (UTC)

Rafhael Lucas Oliveira da Silva (born 30 November 1992), known as Rafhael Lucas, is a Brazilian footballer who plays for Operário as a forward.

== Club career ==
Born in Curitiba, Paraná, Rafhael Lucas joined Coritiba's youth setup in 2002, as a central defender. He made his senior debut while on loan for São Carlos in 2012.

Rafhael Lucas was subsequently loaned to Arapongas, scoring two goals in five matches. On February 14, 2014, he joined Atlético Sorocaba, also in a temporary deal.

On September 29, 2014, Rafhael was promoted to Coritiba's main squad, along with fellow youth graduate Walisson. He was the club's top goalscorer in 2015 Campeonato Paranaense, netting 12 goals in 14 matches.

Rafhael Lucas made his Série A debut on May 9, 2015, starting and scoring the first goal in a 1–2 away loss against Chapecoense; it was also the first goal of the tournament. He appeared in 24 matches during the campaign, as his side avoided relegation.

On December 31, 2015, Rafhael Lucas moved to Goiás, recently relegated to Série B. On October 26, 2016, Rafhael Lucas moved to Fortaleza, then recently relegated to Série C.
