= Marquinhos Gabriel =

Brazilian footballer (born 1990)

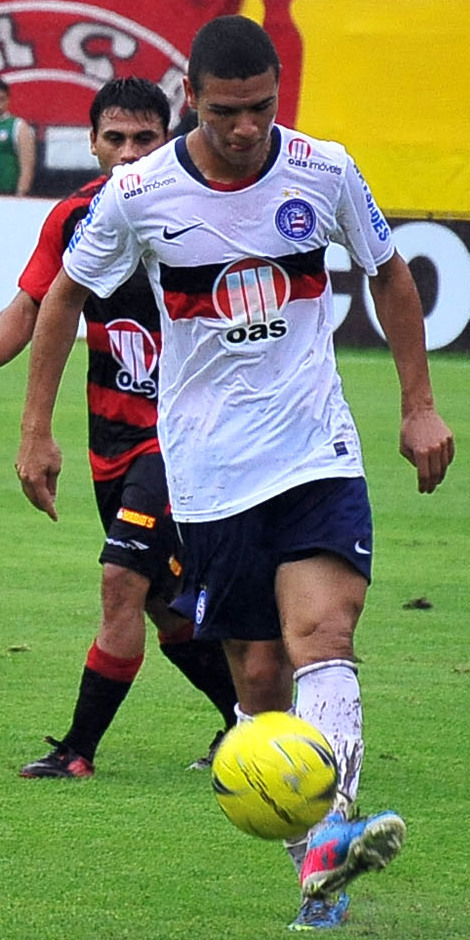

Personal information
- Full name: Marcos Gabriel do Nascimento
- Date of birth: 21 July 1990 (age 36)
- Place of birth: Selbach, Brazil
- Height: 1.74 m (5 ft 9 in)
- Positions: Attacking midfielder; winger

Team information
- Current team: Vila Nova
- Number: 10

Youth career
- 2005: América-RS
- 2006: Juventude
- 2007: Passo Fundo
- 2007–2009: Internacional

Senior career*
| Years | Team | Apps | (Gls) |
| 2009–2013 | Internacional | 36 | (3) |
| 2011 | → Avaí (loan) | 13 | (3) |
| 2012 | → Sport Recife (loan) | 39 | (5) |
| 2013 | → Bahia (loan) | 44 | (4) |
| 2014 | Palmeiras | 19 | (2) |
| 2014–2016 | Al Nassr | 18 | (3) |
| 2015 | → Santos (loan) | 44 | (9) |
| 2016–2018 | Corinthians | 94 | (10) |
| 2018 | → Al-Nasr (loan) | 18 | (5) |
| 2019–2020 | Cruzeiro | 56 | (4) |
| 2020 | → Athletico Paranaense (loan) | 16 | (2) |
| 2021 | Vasco da Gama | 42 | (7) |
| 2022 | Criciúma | 20 | (6) |
| 2022–2023 | Goiás | 18 | (1) |
| 2023–2024 | Criciúma | 60 | (4) |
| 2025 | Avaí | 47 | (4) |
| 2026– | Vila Nova | 14 | (2) |
- * Club domestic league appearances and goals as of 14 April 2026

Marcos Gabriel do Nascimento (born 21 July 1990), known as Marquinhos Gabriel, is a Brazilian footballer who plays for Vila Nova. Mainly an attacking midfielder, he can also play as a central midfielder or a winger.

== Club career ==
Born in Selbach, Rio Grande do Sul, Marquinhos Gabriel joined Internacional's youth setup in 2007, after spells in minor clubs of the same state. He was promoted to the main squad in 2009, and made his senior debut on 5 February, coming on as a late substitute in a 4–1 home routing over Canoas for the Campeonato Gaúcho championship.

Marquinhos Gabriel made his Série A debut on 19 August 2009, replacing Luis Bolaños in a 1–2 home loss against Corinthians. Late in the month, he scored his first professional goal, netting the first in a 4–0 home win against Goiás; he finished the campaign with 14 appearances, scoring three goals.

After appearing more sparingly in 2010, Marquinhos Gabriel was loaned to Avaí on 23 February 2011. He was recalled by Colorado on 26 July, after appearing in only five matches for the national league.

On 13 January 2012, Marquinhos Gabriel joined Sport Recife, in a season-long loan deal. After appearing regularly, he moved to fellow league team Bahia, also in a temporary deal.

After impressing with the latter during the season, Marquinhos Gabriel signed for Palmeiras on 15 January 2014. On 17 July, however, he left the club and joined Saudi Professional League side Al Nassr.

On 16 January 2015, Marquinhos Gabriel returned to Brazil, signing a one-year loan deal with Santos. He impressed during his time at Peixe, who tried to sign him permanently at the expiration of his loan.

On 18 April 2016, Marquinhos Gabriel joined Corinthians for an undisclosed fee, believed to be US$ 3 million.

== Career statistics ==
As of 11 March 2020

| Club | Season | League | | | State League | | Cup | | Continental | | Other | | Total | |
| Club | Season | Division | Apps | Goals | Apps | Goals | Apps | Goals | Apps | Goals | Apps | Goals | Apps | Goals |
|---|---|---|---|---|---|---|---|---|---|---|---|---|---|---|
| Internacional | 2009 | Série A | 14 | 3 | 1 | 0 | — | | 2 (Note: All appearance(s) in Copa Sudamericana) | 0 | — | | 17 | 3 |
| Internacional | 2010 | Série A | 12 | 0 | 2 | 0 | — | | — | | — | | 14 | 0 |
| Internacional | 2011 | Série A | 0 | 0 | 6 | 0 | — | | — | | — | | 6 | 0 |
| Internacional | Subtotal | | 26 | 3 | 9 | 0 | — | | 2 | 0 | — | | 37 | 3 |
| Avaí | 2011 | Série A | 5 | 0 | 8 | 3 | 8 | 1 | — | | — | | 21 | 4 |
| Sport Recife | 2012 | Série A | 21 | 4 | 16 | 1 | 2 | 0 | — | | — | | 39 | 5 |
| Bahia | 2013 | Série A | 31 | 4 | 10 | 0 | 2 | 0 | 2 | 0 | — | | 45 | 4 |
| Palmeiras | 2014 | Série A | 8 | 1 | 9 | 1 | 2 | 0 | — | | — | | 19 | 2 |
| Al Nassr | 2014–15 | Saudi Professional League | 11 | 1 | — | | 1 | 0 | — | | 1 (Note: All appearance(s) in Saudi Super Cup) | 0 | 13 | 1 |
| Al Nassr | 2015–16 | Saudi Professional League | 7 | 2 | — | | 1 | 0 | 2 (Note: All appearance(s) in AFC Champions League) | 0 | 0 | 0 | 10 | 2 |
| Al Nassr | Subtotal | | 18 | 3 | — | | 2 | 0 | 2 | 0 | 1 | 0 | 23 | 3 |
| Santos | 2015 | Série A | 26 | 3 | 7 | 1 | 11 | 5 | — | | — | | 44 | 9 |
| Corinthians | 2016 | Série A | 34 | 5 | 0 | 0 | 4 | 0 | 1 (Note: All appearance(s) in Copa Libertadores) | 1 | — | | 39 | 6 |
| Corinthians | 2017 | Série A | 25 | 3 | 3 | 0 | 3 | 0 | 3 | 0 | — | | 34 | 3 |
| Corinthians | 2018 | Série A | 12 | 1 | 5 | 0 | 1 | 0 | 3 | 0 | — | | 21 | 1 |
| Corinthians | Subtotal | | 71 | 9 | 8 | 0 | 8 | 0 | 7 | 1 | — | | 94 | 10 |
| Al-Nasr | 2018–19 | UAE Pro-League | 12 | 2 | — | | 5 | 2 | — | | — | | 17 | 4 |
| Cruzeiro | 2019 | Série A | 28 | 0 | 12 | 4 | 5 | 0 | 7 | 0 | — | | 52 | 4 |
| Athletico Paranaense | 2020 | Série A | 0 | 0 | 3 | 0 | 0 | 0 | 2 | 0 | 1 (Note: All appearance(s) in Supercopa do Brasil) | 0 | 6 | 0 |
| Career total | | | 246 | 29 | 82 | 10 | 45 | 8 | 21 | 1 | 2 | 0 | 396 | 48 |

== Honours ==
Internacional

- Campeonato Gaúcho: 2009, 2011
- Recopa Sudamericana: 2011

Santos

- Campeonato Paulista: 2015

Corinthians

- Campeonato Brasileiro Série A: 2017
- Campeonato Paulista: 2017, 2018

Criciúma

- Recopa Catarinense: 2024

Avaí

- Campeonato Catarinense: 2025
