= Federação Paulista de Futebol =

Governing body of association football

- Formation: 22 April 1941; 85 years ago
- Type: Sports federation
- Headquarters: São Paulo, São Paulo, Brazil
- President: Reinaldo Carneiro Bastos
- Website: www.fpf.org.br

Federação Paulista de Futebol (FPF) is the governing body of association football within the Brazilian state of São Paulo. It was founded on 22 April 1941, and currently organises the Campeonato Paulista, the Copa São Paulo de Juniores and the Copa Paulista de Futebol, among others.

== Presidents ==
	Name	Term start	Term end
1.	Ubirajara Pamplona	1941	1941
2.	Taciano de Oliveira	1941	1943
3.	Getúlio Vargas Filho	1943	1943
4.	Antônio Carlos Guimarães	1943	1945
5.	Antônio Feliciano	1945	1947
6.	Roberto Gomes Pedrosa	1947	1954
7.	Mário Frugielle	1954	1955
8.	João Mendonça Falcão	1955	1970
9.	José Ermírio de Moraes Filho	1970	1976
10.	Alfredo Metidieri	1976	1979
11.	Nabi Abi Chedid	1979	1982
12.	José Maria Marin	1982	1988
13.	Eduardo José Farah	1988	2003
14.	Marco Polo Del Nero	2003	2015
15.	Reinaldo Carneiro Bastos	2015	Incumbent

== Current clubs in Brasileirão ==
List of clubs from São Paulo competing in the 2026 season across the Brazilian football league system.

Club	City
Série A
Corinthians	São Paulo
Palmeiras	São Paulo
Red Bull Bragantino	Bragança Paulista
Santos	Santos
São Paulo	São Paulo
Mirassol	Mirassol
Série B
Botafogo	Ribeirão Preto
São Bernardo	São Bernardo do Campo
Novorizontino	Novo Horizonte
Ponte Preta	Campinas
Série C
Ituano	Itu
Guarani	Campinas
Ferroviária	Araraquara
Internacional	Limeira
Série D
Água Santa	Diadema
Velo Clube	Rio Claro
Portuguesa	São Paulo
Noroeste	Bauru
XV de Piracicaba	Piracicaba

== See also ==
- Confederação Brasileira de Futebol
- Campeonato Paulista
- Campeonato Paulista Série A2
- Campeonato Paulista Série A3
- Campeonato Paulista Série A4
- Campeonato Paulista Segunda Divisão
