= 2016 SE Palmeiras season =

Palmeiras
2016 season
- President: Paulo Nobre
- Coach: Marcelo Oliveira (until March 9); Alberto Valentim (interim); Cuca (March 14 – December 11)
- Stadium: Allianz Parque
- Série A: Champions
- Campeonato Paulista: Semifinal
- Copa Libertadores: Second stage
- Copa do Brasil: Quarterfinal
- Top goalscorer: League: Gabriel Jesus (12 goals); All: Gabriel Jesus (21 goals)
- Highest home attendance: 40,986 (vs. Chapecoense – November 27)
- Lowest home attendance: 15,475 (vs. Red Bull Brasil – March 24)
- Average home league attendance: 29,201
Home colors	Away colors	Third colors

The 2016 season was the 102nd in SE Palmeiras existence. This season Palmeiras participated in the Campeonato Paulista, Copa Libertadores, Copa do Brasil and the Série A.

== Players ==
=== Squad information ===
Players at the end of the season. Note: Flags indicate national team as defined under FIFA eligibility rules; some limited exceptions apply. Players may hold more than one non-FIFA nationality.

No.	Pos.	Nation	Player
1	GK	BRA	Fernando Prass
2	DF	BRA	Fabiano (on loan from Cruzeiro)
3	DF	BRA	Edu Dracena
4	DF	BRA	Vitor Hugo
5	MF	BRA	Arouca
6	DF	BRA	Egídio
7	FW	BRA	Dudu
8	FW	PAR	Lucas Barrios
10	MF	BRA	Cleiton Xavier
11	MF	BRA	Zé Roberto
13	DF	BRA	Roger Carvalho (on loan from Tombense)
14	FW	BRA	Erik
15	MF	ARG	Agustín Allione
16	DF	BRA	Fabrício (on loan from Internacional)
17	MF	BRA	Jean
18	MF	BRA	Gabriel (on loan from Monte Azul)
19	FW	BRA	Rafael Marques

No.	Pos.	Nation	Player
20	MF	BRA	Rodrigo (on loan from Tombense)
21	MF	BRA	Thiago Santos
22	DF	BRA	João Pedro
23	FW	BRA	Róger Guedes
25	GK	BRA	Vagner
26	DF	COL	Yerry Mina
27	MF	BRA	Matheus Sales
28	MF	BRA	Moisés
29	FW	BRA	Alecsandro
30	FW	BRA	Leandro Pereira (on loan from Brugge)
31	DF	BRA	Thiago Martins
32	MF	BRA	Tchê Tchê
33	FW	BRA	Gabriel Jesus
37	MF	BRA	Vitinho
48	GK	BRA	Vinicius Silvestre
49	GK	BRA	Jailson

=== Transfers ===
==== Transfers in ====
Pos.	Player	Transferred from	Fee/notes	Date	Source
GK	(Brazil) Vagner	(Brazil) Avaí	Sign	December 10, 2015	
DF	(Brazil) Roger	(Brazil) Botafogo	Sign	December 10, 2015	
MF	(Brazil) Rodrigo	(Brazil) Goiás	Loan	December 11, 2015	
MF	(Brazil) Régis	(Brazil) Sport	Loan	December 18, 2015	
DF	(Brazil) Edu Dracena	(Brazil) Corinthians	Sign	December 22, 2015	
FW	(Brazil) Erik	(Brazil) Goiás	Sign	December 23, 2015	
MF	(Brazil) Moisés	(Croatia) Rijeka	Sign	December 24, 2015	
DF	(Brazil) Thiago Martins	(Brazil) Paysandu	Loan return	January 6, 2016	
DF	(Brazil) Victor Luis	(Brazil) Ceará	Loan return	January 6, 2016	
MF	(Brazil) Jean	(Brazil) Fluminense	Sign	January 13, 2016	
FW	(Brazil) Róger Guedes	(Brazil) Criciúma	Sign	April 5, 2016	
DF	(Brazil) Fabrício	(Brazil) Cruzeiro	Loan	April 26, 2016	
DF	(Brazil) Fabiano	(Brazil) Cruzeiro	Loan	April 26, 2016	
DF / MF	(Brazil) Tchê Tchê	(Brazil) Audax	Sign	April 28, 2016	
DF	(Colombia) Yerry Mina	(Colombia) Santa Fe	Sign	May 1, 2016	
FW	(Brazil) Leandro Pereira	(Belgium) Brugge	Loan	June 29, 2016	

==== Transfers out ====
Pos.	Player	Transferred to	Fee/notes	Date	Source
MF	(Brazil) Andrei Girotto	Later he signed with the (Japan) Kyoto Sanga.	Released	December 7, 2015	
DF	(Brazil) João Paulo		Released	December 7, 2015	
DF	(Brazil) Victor Ramos		Released	December 10, 2015	
GK	(Brazil) Aranha		Contract terminated	December 16, 2015	
MF	(Brazil) Renato	(Brazil) Ponte Preta	Loan	December 30, 2015	
DF	(Brazil) Jackson	(Brazil) Internacional	Loan return	January 2, 2016	
GK	(Brazil) Fábio	(Brazil) Oeste	Loan	January 4, 2016	
MF	(Brazil) Amaral	(Brazil) Coritiba	Loan	January 4, 2016	
FW	(Brazil) Kelvin	(Portugal) Porto	Loan return	January 19, 2016	
FW	(Argentina) Pablo Mouche	(Argentina) Lanús	Loan	January 25, 2016	
DF	(Brazil) Lucas	(Brazil) Cruzeiro	Loan	April 26, 2016	
MF	(Brazil) Robinho	(Brazil) Cruzeiro	Loan	April 26, 2016	
DF	(Brazil) Nathan	(Brazil) Criciúma	Loan	April 27, 2016	
DF	(Brazil) Victor Luis	(Brazil) Botafogo	Loan	April 27, 2016	
MF	(Brazil) Fellype Gabriel	None	Contract mutually terminated	April 27, 2016	
DF	(Brazil) Lucas Taylor	(Brazil) Criciúma	Loan	April 27, 2016	
MF	(Brazil) Régis	(Brazil) Bahia	Loan	May 24, 2016	
DF	(Brazil) Leandro Almeida	(Brazil) Internacional	Sign	June 8, 2016	
FW	(Argentina) Jonatan Cristaldo	(Mexico) Cruz Azul	Sign	June 29, 2016	
FW	(Argentina) Pablo Mouche	(Serbia) Red Star Belgrade	Loan	July 8, 2016	
FW	(Brazil) Gabriel Jesus	(England) Manchester City	Sign. He will join the team in January 2017.	August 3, 2016	
DF	(Argentina) Fernando Tobio	(Argentina) Boca Juniors	Loan renewed.	August 9, 2016	
FW	(Brazil) Luan	(Brazil) Atlético Paranaense	Loan	August 20, 2016	

== Competitions ==
=== Overview ===
Competition	First match	Last match	Starting round	Final position	Record							
Competition	First match	Last match	Starting round	Final position	Pld	W	D	L	GF	GA	GD	Win %
Série A	14 May 2016	11 December 2016	Matchday 1	Winners	38	24	8	6	62	32	+30	63.16
Copa do Brasil	31 August 2016	19 October 2016	Round of 16	Quarter-Finals	4	1	1	2	5	4	+1	25.00
Campeonato Paulista	31 January 2016	24 April 2016	Matchday 1	Semi-Finals	17	8	4	5	29	19	+10	47.06
Copa Libertadores	16 February 2016	14 April 2016	Group stage	Group stage	6	2	2	2	12	8	+4	33.33
Total					65	35	15	15	108	63	+45	53.85

Source: Competitions

=== Friendlies ===
On November 27, 2015, was announced that Palmeiras will dispute a friendly tournament in Montevideo, Uruguay between January 20–23.

January 20	Palmeiras (Brazil)	2–0	(Paraguay) Libertad	Montevideo, Uruguay
19:30 UTC−02	Allione 81'; Moisés 90'	Report	Molinas (yellow card) 61'	Stadium: Estadio Centenario; Referee: Andrés Cunha (Uruguay)

January 23	Nacional (Uruguay)	0–0 (4–3 p)	(Brazil) Palmeiras	Montevideo, Uruguay
23:15 UTC−02	Romero (yellow card) 24'; Gorga (yellow card) 68'	Report	Robinho (yellow card) 52'; Moisés (yellow card) 79'	Stadium: Estadio Centenario; Referee: Darío Ubriaco (Uruguay)
	Penalties
	Fernández (penalty missed); Polenta (penalty scored); González (penalty scored); Ramírez (penalty missed); Fucile (penalty scored); Barcia (penalty scored)		(penalty scored) Zé Roberto; (penalty scored) Rafael Marques; (penalty missed) Dudu; (penalty missed) Allione; (penalty scored) Fernando Prass; (penalty missed) Gabriel Jesus

=== Campeonato Paulista ===
==== Standings ====
Palmeiras was drawn in the Group B.

Pos	Team	Pld	W	D	L	GF	GA	GD	Pts	Qualification or relegation
1	Palmeiras (Q)	15	7	3	5	25	17	+8	24	Advance to the quarter-finals
2	São Bernardo (Q)	15	6	5	4	22	21	+1	23	Advance to the quarter-finals
3	Ponte Preta (E)	15	6	4	5	22	16	+6	22	
4	Ituano (E)	15	6	4	5	19	19	0	22	
5	Novorizontino (E)	15	5	6	4	24	21	+3	21	

(E) Eliminated; (Q) Qualified for the phase indicated

==== First stage ====
January 31 1	Botafogo-SP	0–2	Palmeiras	Ribeirão Preto
19:30 UTC−02	Mirita (yellow card) 31'; César Gaúcho (yellow card) 41'	Report	Alecsandro (yellow card) 13', (goal) 60'; Robinho (yellow card) 74'; Dudu 86'	Stadium: Santa Cruz; Attendance: 18,635; Referee: Marcelo Aparecido Ribeiro de Souza

February 4 2	Palmeiras	2–2	São Bento	São Paulo
21:00 UTC−02	Gabriel Jesus 5'; Leandro Almeida (yellow card) 71'; João Paulo 90' (o.g.)	Report	Éder (yellow card) 27', (goal) 33'; Morais 40'; Rodriguinho (yellow card) 72'; Fernandinho (yellow card) 76'	Stadium: Pacaembu; Attendance: 19,177; Referee: Flávio Rodrigues de Souza

February 10 3	Oeste	0–0	Palmeiras	São José do Rio Preto
21:45 UTC−02	Guilherme Rato (yellow card) 83'	Report	Robinho (yellow card) 30'	Stadium: Anísio Haddad; Attendance: 15,036; Referee: Vinicius Furlan

February 13 4	Palmeiras	1–2	Linense	São Paulo
17:00 UTC−02	Alecsandro 37' (pen.)	Report	William Pottker (yellow card) 26', (goal) 39', 81'; Zé Antônio (yellow card) 58'; Ricardinho (yellow card) 62'	Stadium: Allianz Parque; Attendance: 20,768; Referee: José Claudio Rocha Filho

February 20 5	Palmeiras	0–0	Santos	São Paulo
17:00 UTC−03	Matheus Sales (yellow card) 47'; Gabriel Jesus (yellow card) 62'; Alecsandro (yellow card) 90+2'	Report	Victor Ferraz (yellow card) 33'; Ricardo Oliveira (yellow card) 72'; Elano (yellow card) 79'; Zeca (yellow card) 82'; Léo Cittadini (yellow card) 83'; Gustavo Henrique (yellow card) 87'	Stadium: Allianz Parque; Attendance: 23,181; Referee: Raphael Claus

February 25 6	XV de Piracicaba	1–4	Palmeiras	Piracicaba
21:30 UTC−03	Rivaldinho 50'	Report	Vitor Hugo 41'; Gabriel Jesus 46', 65'; Lucas (yellow card) 54'; Alecsandro 61'; Jean (yellow card) 72'	Stadium: Barão da Serra Negra; Attendance: 10,836; Referee: Thiago Luis Scarascati

February 28 7	Palmeiras	1–2	Ferroviária	São Paulo
17:00 UTC−03	Cristaldo 62'; Robinho (yellow card) 76'	Report	Fernando Gabriel 40'; Marcão (yellow card) 67'; Rafael Miranda (yellow card) 79'; Tiago Adan (yellow card) 82'; Rafinha 90+3'	Stadium: Allianz Parque; Attendance: 18,413; Referee: Thiago Duarte Peixoto

March 6 8	Palmeiras	4–1	Capivariano	São Paulo
16:00 UTC−03	Allione 7'; Lucas (yellow card) 35'; Thiago Martins 40', (yellow card) 78'; Cristaldo 48' (pen.); Alecsandro 86'	Report	Rodolfo 29'; Bonfim (yellow card) 45' (yellow-red card) 68'; Maguinho (yellow card) 52'	Stadium: Allianz Parque; Attendance: 21,499; Referee: Vinicius Gonçalves Dias Araujo

March 13 9	São Paulo	0–2	Palmeiras	São Paulo
11:00 UTC−03	Hudson (yellow card) 35'; Bruno (yellow card) 36'; Maicon (yellow card) 78'; Caramelo (yellow card) 80'; João Schmidt (yellow card) 88'	Report	Edu Dracena (yellow card) 31'; Matheus Sales (yellow card) 51'; Dudu 74', (yellow card) 78'; Robinho 86'	Stadium: Pacaembu; Attendance: 14,051; Referee: Raphael Claus

March 20 10	Audax	2–1	Palmeiras	Osasco
18:30 UTC−03	Velicka 10' (pen.); Camacho 32'; Bruno Paulo (yellow card) 90+3'	Report	Gabriel Jesus (yellow card) 20'; Edu Dracena (yellow card) 45'; Barrios 77'	Stadium: Prefeito José Liberatti; Attendance: 9,391; Referee: Vinicius Furlan

March 24 11	Palmeiras	1–2	Red Bull Brasil	São Paulo
20:30 UTC−03	Alecsandro 59', (yellow card) 90+3'	Report	Thiago Galhardo 39'; Roger 44', (yellow card) 81'; Diego Sacoman (yellow card) 56'; Willian Rocha (yellow card) 90+4'	Stadium: Pacaembu; Attendance: 15,475; Referee: Rodrigo Guarizo Ferreira do Amaral

March 27 12	Água Santa	4–1	Palmeiras	Presidente Prudente
16:00 UTC−03	Gustavo 34'; Russo (yellow card) 41'; Everaldo 44'; Bruninho 45+3'; Roger 67' (o.g.); Bruno Ré (yellow card) 90+4'	Report	Robinho 43' (pen.); Edu Dracena (yellow card) 63'; Egídio (yellow card) 90+1'	Stadium: Prudentão; Attendance: 2,821; Referee: Leandro Bizzio Marinho

March 31 13	Palmeiras	3–0	Rio Claro	São Paulo
20:30 UTC−03	Matheus Sales (yellow card) 33'; Robinho (yellow card) 36'; Alecsandro (yellow card) 41', (goal) 44'; Gabriel Jesus 54'; Egídio (yellow card) 63'; Thiago Santos (yellow card) 81'; Rafael Marques 86'	Report	Léo Coelho (yellow card) 39'; Lucas Frigeri (yellow card) 41'; Weslen (yellow card) 45+1'; Luís Felipe (yellow card) 68'; Thiago Cristian (yellow card) 90+2'	Stadium: Pacaembu; Attendance: 15,723; Referee: Marcelo Aparecido Ribeiro de Souza

April 3 14	Palmeiras	1–0	Corinthians	São Paulo
16:00 UTC−03	Gabriel Jesus (yellow card) 43'; Arouca (yellow card) 64'; Dudu 77'; Egídio (yellow card) 81'; Alecsandro (yellow card) 87'	Report	Lucca (yellow card) 43'; Felipe (yellow card) 45+4'; Giovanni Augusto (yellow card) 77'	Stadium: Pacaembu; Attendance: 22,663; Referee: Flávio Rodrigues de Souza

April 10 15	Mogi Mirim	1–2	Palmeiras	Mogi Mirim
16:00 UTC−03	Lulinha 20' (pen.), (yellow card) 66'	Report	Vitor Hugo (yellow card) 5'; Alecsandro 15'; Matheus Sales (yellow card) 18'; Allione (yellow card) 49'; Jean (yellow card) 61'; Barrios 64'	Stadium: Vail Chaves; Attendance: 7,759; Referee: Vinicius Gonçalves Dias Araujo

==== Quarterfinal ====
April 18	Palmeiras	2–0	São Bernardo	São Paulo
21:00 UTC−03	Gabriel Jesus (yellow card) 24', (goal) 86'; Alecsandro 35'	Report	João Francisco (yellow card) 43'; Eduardo (yellow card) 61'; Tatá (yellow card) 67'; Luciano Castán (yellow card) 89'	Stadium: Allianz Parque; Attendance: 30,731; Referee: Vinicius Furlan

==== Semifinal ====
April 24	Santos	2–2 (3–2 p)	Palmeiras	Santos
16:00 UTC−03	Gabriel 39', 73', (yellow card) 45+3'; Elano (yellow card) 45'	Report	Egídio (yellow card) 16'; Alecsandro (yellow card) 45+3'; Gabriel (yellow card) 54'; Thiago Martins (yellow card) 56'; Matheus Sales (yellow card) 60'; Rafael Marques 87', 88'; Vagner (yellow card) 89'; Vitor Hugo (yellow card) 90+3'	Stadium: Vila Belmiro; Attendance: 13,690; Referee: Marcelo Aparecido Ribeiro de Souza
	Penalties
	Lucas Lima (penalty missed); David Braz (penalty scored); Zeca (penalty scored); Victor Ferraz (penalty scored)		(penalty scored) Cleiton Xavier; (penalty missed) Barrios; (penalty scored) Jean; (penalty missed) Rafael Marques; (penalty missed) Fernando Prass

=== Copa Libertadores ===
As a 2015 Copa do Brasil winner, Palmeiras qualified directly to the second stage.

The draw of the tournament was held on December 22, 2015, at the CONMEBOL Convention Centre in Luque, Paraguay.

==== Standings ====
Pos	Team	Pld	W	D	L	GF	GA	GD	Pts	Qualification
1	(Argentina) Rosario Central (A)	6	3	2	1	13	8	+5	11	Final stages
2	(Uruguay) Nacional (A)	6	2	3	1	6	6	0	9	Final stages
3	(Brazil) Palmeiras	6	2	2	2	12	8	+4	8	
4	(Uruguay) River Plate	6	0	3	3	6	15	−9	3	

Source: CONMEBOL
Rules for classification: 1) points; 2) goal difference; 3) goals scored; 4) away goals scored; 5) drawing of lots.
(A) Advanced to the round of 16

==== Second stage ====
February 16 1	River Plate (Uruguay)	2–2	(Brazil) Palmeiras	Maldonado, Uruguay
21:45 UTC−02	Rodríguez (yellow card) 24'; Santos 50' (pen.); Montelongo 63'; González (yellow card) 90+2'	CONMEBOL; GloboEsporte	Lucas (yellow card) 28'; Jean 33'; Fernando Prass (yellow card) 49'; Gabriel Jesus 57'; Roger (yellow card) 66'; Zé Roberto (yellow card) 80'	Stadium: Estadio Domingo Burgueño; Referee: Julio Bascuñán (Chile)

March 3 2	Palmeiras (Brazil)	2–0	(Argentina) Rosario Central	São Paulo, Brazil
21:45 UTC−03	Thiago Santos (yellow card) 18'; Cristaldo 24'; Robinho (yellow card) 59'; Allione (yellow card) 85', (goal) 90+3'; Gabriel Jesus (yellow card) 87'	CONMEBOL; GloboEsporte	Burgos (yellow card) 38'	Stadium: Allianz Parque; Attendance: 36,100; Referee: Enrique Cáceres (Paraguay)

March 9 3	Palmeiras (Brazil)	1–2	(Uruguay) Nacional	São Paulo, Brazil
21:45 UTC−03	Zé Roberto (yellow card) 18'; Thiago Martins (yellow card) 45+1'; Gabriel Jesus 45+3'; Egídio (yellow card) 66'	CONMEBOL; GloboEsporte	Fucile (yellow card) 22' (yellow-red card) 42'; López 37', (yellow card) 86'; Barcia 40'; Eguren (yellow card) 41'; Fernández (yellow card) 60'; Conde (yellow card) 69'; Romero (yellow card) 72'; Léo Gamalho (red card) 90+2'	Stadium: Allianz Parque; Attendance: 37,073; Referee: Enrique Osses (Chile)

March 17 4	Nacional (Uruguay)	1–0	(Brazil) Palmeiras	Montevideo, Uruguay
21:45 UTC−03	Porras (yellow card) 7'; López 50', (yellow card) 59'	CONMEBOL; GloboEsporte	Lucas (yellow card) 10'; Alecsandro (yellow card) 33'; Arouca (yellow card) 83'	Stadium: Gran Parque Central; Referee: Carlos Vera (Ecuador)

April 6 5	Rosario Central (Argentina)	3–3	(Brazil) Palmeiras	Rosario, Argentina
21:45 UTC−03	Donatti 32'; Pinola (yellow card) 45'; Sosa (yellow card) 45'; Cervi 50'; Fernández (yellow card) 58'; Ruben 66' (pen.); Musto (yellow card) 72'	CONMEBOL; GloboEsporte	Gabriel Jesus 4', 44', (red card) 72'; Gabriel (yellow card) 49'; Barrios 76', (yellow card) 82'; Fernando Prass (yellow card) 85'	Stadium: Estadio Gigante de Arroyito; Referee: Roddy Zambrano (Ecuador)

April 14 6	Palmeiras (Brazil)	4–0	(Uruguay) River Plate	São Paulo, Brazil
21:45 UTC−03	Alecsandro (yellow card) 10', (goal) 80' (pen.); Egídio 18'; Allione 45+3', 72'	CONMEBOL; GloboEsporte	Pintos (yellow card) 29'	Stadium: Allianz Parque; Attendance: 30,416; Referee: Óscar Maldonado (Bolivia)

=== Campeonato Brasileiro ===
==== Standings ====
Pos	Team	Pld	W	D	L	GF	GA	GD	Pts	Qualification or relegation
1	Palmeiras (C)	38	24	8	6	62	32	+30	80	Qualification for 2017 Copa Libertadores group stage
2	Santos	38	22	5	11	59	35	+24	71	Qualification for 2017 Copa Libertadores group stage
3	Flamengo	38	20	11	7	52	35	+17	71	Qualification for 2017 Copa Libertadores group stage
4	Atlético Mineiro	38	17	11	10	61	53	+8	62 (Note: The matchday 38 game between Chapecoense and Atlético Mineiro was cancelled after both teams declined to play following the Chapecoense team plane crash. Both teams received a double walkover (3–0 loss for each team).)	Qualification for 2017 Copa Libertadores group stage
5	Botafogo	38	17	8	13	43	39	+4	59	Qualification for 2017 Copa Libertadores first stage

Source: CBF
Rules for classification: 1) points; 2) wins; 3) goal difference; 4) goals scored; 5) head-to-head results; 6) least red cards received; 7) least yellow cards received; 8) draw.
(C) Champions

==== Matches ====
May 14 1	Palmeiras	4–0	Atlético Paranaense	São Paulo
16:00 UTC−03	Róger Guedes 19'; Barrios (yellow card) 27'; Gabriel Jesus 45', 86'; Thiago Martins 52'	Report	Paulo André (yellow card) 37'; Walter (yellow card) 38'; Léo (yellow card) 50' (yellow-red card) 54'; Nikão (yellow card) 73'	Stadium: Allianz Parque; Attendance: 33,629; Referee: Bruno Arleu de Araujo (Rio de Janeiro)

May 21 2	Ponte Preta	2–1	Palmeiras	Campinas
16:00 UTC−03	Felipe Azevedo 23', 32'; Wellington Paulista (yellow card) 48'; Matheus Jesus (yellow card) 77'; Thiago Galhardo (yellow card) 85'	Report	Matheus Sales (yellow card) 38'; Tchê Tchê (yellow card) 53'; Thiago Martins (yellow card) 58'; Moisés 90'	Stadium: Moisés Lucarelli; Attendance: 7,061; Referee: Leandro Vuaden (Rio Grande do Sul)

May 25 3	Palmeiras	2–0	Fluminense	São Paulo
21:45 UTC−03	Vitor Hugo 57'; Alecsandro 58'; Thiago Martins (yellow card) 71'	Report		Stadium: Allianz Parque; Attendance: 28,534; Referee: Sandro Ricci (Santa Catarina)

May 29 4	São Paulo	1–0	Palmeiras	São Paulo
16:00 UTC−03	Ganso 11'; Lugano (yellow card) 24'; Alan Kardec (yellow card) 29'	Report	Thiago Santos (yellow card) 20'; Zé Roberto (yellow card) 33'; Moisés (yellow card) 71'; Rafael Marques (yellow card) 85'; Vitor Hugo (yellow card) 89'	Stadium: Morumbi; Attendance: 21,016; Referee: Ricardo Marques (Minas Gerais)

June 2 5	Palmeiras	4–3	Grêmio	São Paulo
21:00 UTC−03	Gabriel Jesus 1'; Matheus Sales (yellow card) 19'; Dudu (yellow card) 23'; Vitor Hugo (yellow card) 41', (goal) 72'; Róger Guedes 56'; Fernando Prass (yellow card) 74'; Thiago Santos 83'; Fabrício (yellow card) 87'	Report	Marcelo Hermes (yellow card) 39'; Bressan 45+4'; Giuliano 54'; Bruno Grassi (yellow card) 67'; Geromel (yellow card) 71'; Lincoln (yellow card) 82'; Edílson 90'	Stadium: Pacaembu; Attendance: 19,198; Referee: Marielson Alves Silva (Bahia)

June 5 6	Flamengo	1–2	Palmeiras	Brasília
16:00 UTC−03	Alan Patrick 5'; César Martins (red card) 70'; Mancuello (yellow card) 82'	Report	Gabriel Jesus 3'; Jean 71' (pen.); Vitor Hugo (yellow card) 83'; Cleiton Xavier (yellow card) 90+1'	Stadium: Mané Garrincha; Attendance: 54,665; Referee: Dewson Fernando Freitas da Silva (Pará)

June 12 7	Palmeiras	1–0	Corinthians	São Paulo
16:00 UTC−03	Jean (yellow card) 37'; Cleiton Xavier 47'; Zé Roberto (yellow card) 57'; Edu Dracena (yellow card) 75'; Moisés (yellow card) 87'	Report	Giovanni Augusto (yellow card) 9'; Cristian (yellow card) 24'; Felipe (yellow card) 31'; Fagner (yellow card) 80'	Stadium: Allianz Parque; Attendance: 39,935; Referee: Raphael Claus (São Paulo)

June 15 8	Coritiba	2–2	Palmeiras	Curitiba
21:45 UTC−03	João Paulo 19'; Ruy (yellow card) 25'; Juninho (yellow card) 42'; Edinho (yellow card) 44'; Luccas Claro (yellow card) 57'; Leandro 90+4'	Report	Róger Guedes 6'; Thiago Santos (yellow card) 11'; Thiago Martins (yellow card) 21'; Cristaldo 68'; Gabriel Jesus (yellow card) 77'	Stadium: Couto Pereira; Attendance: 13,593; Referee: Anderson Daronco (Rio Grande do Sul)

June 18 9	Palmeiras	3–1	Santa Cruz	São Paulo
16:00 UTC−03	Dudu 28', 65'; Róger Guedes (yellow card) 38'; Jean 45+2'	Report	Uillian Correia (yellow card) 18' (yellow-red card) 90+2'; Neris (yellow card) 45+1'; Grafite 51'; João Paulo (yellow card) 55'	Stadium: Allianz Parque; Attendance: 34,162; Referee: Eduardo Tomaz de Aquino Valadão (Goiás)

June 21 10	Palmeiras	2–0	América Mineiro	São Paulo
21:30 UTC−03	Gabriel Jesus 18', 26'	Report	Artur (yellow card) 79'	Stadium: Allianz Parque; Attendance: 27,429; Referee: Péricles Bassols Pegado Cortez (Pernambuco)

June 25 11	Cruzeiro	2–1	Palmeiras	Belo Horizonte
19:00 UTC−03	Willian 14', 47'; Bruno Rodrigo (yellow card) 72'; Romero (yellow card) 86'; Arrascaeta (yellow card) 87'; Bruno Ramires (yellow card) 89'	Report	Gabriel Jesus 10'; Edu Dracena (yellow card) 73'; Tchê Tchê (yellow card) 86'	Stadium: Mineirão; Attendance: 18,082; Referee: Leandro Vuaden (Rio Grande do Sul)

June 30 12	Palmeiras	4–0	Figueirense	São Paulo
19:30 UTC−03	Moisés 7'; Dudu 42'; Gabriel Jesus 55', 90'; Róger Guedes (yellow card) 64'	Report	Rafael Moura (yellow card) 32'	Stadium: Allianz Parque; Attendance: 32,834; Referee: Gilberto Rodrigues Castro Junior (Pernambuco)

July 4 13	Sport	1–3	Palmeiras	Recife
20:00 UTC−03	Matheus Ferraz (yellow card) 42'; Samuel Xavier (yellow card) 55'; Gabriel Xavier 58'; Agenor (yellow card) 69'; Wallace (yellow card) 83'	Report	Erik (yellow card) 5', (goal) 10'; Mina (yellow card) 44'; Gabriel Jesus (yellow card) 55', (goal) 65'; Cleiton Xavier 71' (pen.); Thiago Santos (yellow card) 73'; Róger Guedes (yellow card) 78'	Stadium: Ilha do Retiro; Attendance: 26,719; Referee: Anderson Daronco (Rio Grande do Sul)

July 12 14	Palmeiras	1–1	Santos	São Paulo
20:30 UTC−03	Mina 6'; Moisés (yellow card) 9'; Erik (yellow card) 17'; Arouca (yellow card) 84'	Report	Gabriel (yellow card) 9', (goal) 55'; Zeca (yellow card) 64'	Stadium: Allianz Parque; Attendance: 40,035; Referee: Wilton Pereira Sampaio (Goiás)

July 17 15	Internacional	0–1	Palmeiras	Porto Alegre
16:00 UTC−03	Raphinha (yellow card) 36'; Paulão (yellow card) 38'; Nahuelpán (yellow card) 90+1'; William (yellow card) 90+1'	Report	Erik 10'; Gabriel Jesus (yellow card) 47'; Thiago Santos (yellow card) 81'	Stadium: Beira-Rio; Attendance: 27,293; Referee: André Luiz de Freitas Castro (Goiás)

July 24 16	Palmeiras	0–1	Atlético Mineiro	São Paulo
11:00 UTC−03	Tchê Tchê (yellow card) 1'	Report	Carlos César (yellow card) 55'; Leandro Donizete 59'; Rafael Carioca (yellow card) 64'	Stadium: Allianz Parque; Attendance: 39,400; Referee: Wagner do Nascimento Magalhães (Rio de Janeiro)

July 31 17	Botafogo	3–1	Palmeiras	Rio de Janeiro
18:30 UTC−03	Neílton 18', 34'; Canales (yellow card) 39'; Airton (yellow card) 45'; Bruno Silva (yellow card) 76'; Diogo Barbosa (yellow card) 82'; Camilo 86' (pen.)	Report	Edu Dracena (yellow card) 37'; Jean (yellow card) 45+1'; Vitor Hugo (yellow card) 50'; Erik 77'	Stadium: Luso Brasileiro; Attendance: 8,477; Referee: Heber Lopes (Santa Catarina)

August 4 18	Chapecoense	1–1	Palmeiras	Chapecó
21:30 UTC−03	Kempes 29'; Thiego (yellow card) 46'	Report	Jean 84' (pen.)	Stadium: Arena Condá; Attendance: 9,167; Referee: Wilton Pereira Sampaio (Goiás)

August 7 19	Palmeiras	2–1	Vitória	São Paulo
16:00 UTC−03	Barrios 36'; Cleiton Xavier 49'; Tchê Tchê (yellow card) 90'; Zé Roberto (yellow card) 90+2'	Report	Kanu (yellow card) 30'; Euller (yellow card) 54'; Thiago Martins 74' (o.g.); Victor Ramos (yellow card) 79'; Marinho (yellow card) 88'	Stadium: Allianz Parque; Attendance: 30,330; Referee: Braulio da Silva Machado (Santa Catarina)

August 14 20	Atlético Paranaense	0–1	Palmeiras	Curitiba
18:30 UTC−03	Léo (yellow card) 7'; Hernani (yellow card) 33'; Otávio (yellow card) 82'	Report	Thiago Santos (yellow card) 9'; Vitor Hugo 43'; Erik (yellow card) 68'; Cleiton Xavier (yellow card) 83'	Stadium: Arena da Baixada; Referee: Jean Pierre Gonçalves Lima (Rio Grande do Sul)

August 21 21	Palmeiras	2–2	Ponte Preta	São Paulo
16:00 UTC−03	Rafael Marques (yellow card) 2', (goal) 15'; Thiago Martins 69', (yellow card) 76'; Thiago Santos (yellow card) 90+1'	Report	Fábio Ferreira (yellow card) 5'; Wellington Paulista 51'; Reinaldo (yellow card) 57'; Nino Paraíba (yellow card) 62'; William Pottker 72'; Thiago Galhardo (yellow card) 83'; Aranha (yellow card) 84'; João Vitor (yellow card) 90+4'	Stadium: Allianz Parque; Attendance: 29,183; Referee: Heber Lopes (Santa Catarina)

August 28 22	Fluminense	0–2	Palmeiras	Brasília
16:00 UTC−03	Douglas (yellow card) 6'; Wellington Silva (yellow card) 36'; Cícero (yellow card) 50'; Marcos Júnior (yellow card) 79'; Marquinho (yellow card) 81'; Gum (yellow card) 84'; Danilinho (yellow card) 90+2'	Report	Gabriel Jesus (yellow card) 14'; Dudu 18', (yellow card) 57'; Jean 24'; Mina (yellow card) 42'; Vitor Hugo (yellow card) 48'; Arouca (yellow card) 83'	Stadium: Mané Garrincha; Attendance: 12,037; Referee: Ricardo Marques (Minas Gerais)

September 7 23	Palmeiras	2–1	São Paulo	São Paulo
21:45 UTC−03	Gabriel (yellow card) 45+3'; Mina (yellow card) 52', (goal) 55'; Vitor Hugo 70'; Jean (yellow card) 84'	Report	Chávez 47', (yellow card) 49'; Mena (yellow card) 83'; Lyanco (yellow card) 90'	Stadium: Allianz Parque; Attendance: 39,944; Referee: Sandro Ricci (Santa Catarina)

September 11 24	Grêmio	0–0	Palmeiras	Porto Alegre
18:30 UTC−03	Edílson (yellow card) 36'; Kannemann (yellow card) 51'; Douglas (yellow card) 54'; Walace (yellow card) 60'	Report	Edu Dracena (yellow card) 61'; Gabriel (yellow card) 84'; Jailson (yellow card) 90+4'	Stadium: Arena do Grêmio; Attendance: 21,578; Referee: Emerson de Almeida Ferreira (Minas Gerais)

September 14 25	Palmeiras	1–1	Flamengo	São Paulo
21:45 UTC−03	Vitor Hugo (yellow card) 51'; Gabriel Jesus (yellow card) 68', (goal) 82'	Report	Márcio Araújo (yellow card) 16' (yellow-red card) 39'; Alan Patrick 62'	Stadium: Allianz Parque; Attendance: 32,885; Referee: André Luiz de Freitas Castro (Goiás)

September 17 26	Corinthians	0–2	Palmeiras	São Paulo
16:00 UTC−03	Balbuena (yellow card) 32'; Léo Príncipe (yellow card) 63' (yellow-red card) 75'	Report	Moisés 4', (yellow card) 83'; Gabriel (yellow card) 36'; Leandro Pereira (yellow card) 55'; Mina 76'; Thiago Santos (yellow card) 85'	Stadium: Arena Corinthians; Attendance: 39,879; Referee: Heber Lopes (Santa Catarina)

September 24 27	Palmeiras	2–1	Coritiba	São Paulo
16:00 UTC−03	Dudu (yellow card) 48'; Moisés (yellow card) 48'; Leandro Pereira 50'; Mina 56'	Report	Iago (yellow card) 41', (goal) 75'; Nery Bareiro (yellow card) 49'; Edinho (yellow card) 53'	Stadium: Allianz Parque; Attendance: 30,962; Referee: Caio Max Augusto Vieira (Rio Grande do Norte)

October 3 28	Santa Cruz	2–3	Palmeiras	Recife
20:00 UTC−03	Derley (yellow card) 35'; Danny Morais (yellow card) 39'; Neris (yellow card) 39'; Allan (yellow card) 45'; Arthur 55'; Pisano (yellow card) 57'; Grafite 69' (pen.), (yellow card) 90+1'	Report	Zé Roberto 32'; Erik (yellow card) 42'; Leandro Pereira 65'; Róger Guedes 79'; Jailson (yellow card) 90+2'; Gabriel Jesus (yellow card) 90+3'	Stadium: Arruda; Attendance: 7,189; Referee: Dewson Fernando Freitas da Silva (Pará)

October 9 29	América Mineiro	0–2	Palmeiras	Londrina
17:00 UTC−03	Roger (yellow card) 6'; Gilson (yellow card) 25'; Fernando Leal (red card) 54'	Report	Tchê Tchê 2'; Róger Guedes (yellow card) 81'; Alecsandro 87'	Stadium: Estádio do Café; Attendance: 27,895; Referee: Wagner do Nascimento Magalhães (Rio de Janeiro)

October 13 30	Palmeiras	0–0	Cruzeiro	Araraquara
19:30 UTC−03	Gabriel Jesus (yellow card) 55'	Report	Ezequiel (yellow card) 19'; Ábila (yellow card) 26'; Henrique (yellow card) 53'; Rafinha (yellow card) 60'	Stadium: Fonte Luminosa; Attendance: 15,709; Referee: Jailson Macedo Freitas (Bahia)

October 16 31	Figueirense	1–2	Palmeiras	Florianópolis
17:00 UTC−02	Jackson Caucaia (yellow card) 23'; Rafael Moura (yellow card) 55'; Rafael Silva 80'	Report	Dudu (yellow card) 8'; Gabriel Jesus (yellow card) 28'; Jean 57' (pen.), 77'; Vitor Hugo (yellow card) 79'	Stadium: Orlando Scarpelli; Attendance: 17,090; Referee: Igor Junio Benevenuto (Minas Gerais)

October 23 32	Palmeiras	2–1	Sport	São Paulo
17:00 UTC−02	Dudu 20'; Fabiano (yellow card) 38'; Tchê Tchê 45'; Thiago Santos (yellow card) 90'; Jailson (yellow card) 90+1'	Report	Rogério 32'; Diego Souza (yellow card) 53'; Ruiz (yellow card) 82'	Stadium: Allianz Parque; Attendance: 31,107; Referee: Ricardo Marques (Minas Gerais)

October 29 33	Santos	1–0	Palmeiras	Santos
19:30 UTC−02	Copete 67'; Lucas Lima (yellow card) 70'; Zeca (yellow card) 73'; Ricardo Oliveira (yellow card) 80'; Noguera (yellow card) 83'	Report	Mina (yellow card) 47'; Moisés (yellow card) 86'; Gabriel Jesus (yellow card) 90+4'	Stadium: Vila Belmiro; Attendance: 13,574; Referee: Dewson Fernando Freitas da Silva (Pará)

November 6 34	Palmeiras	1–0	Internacional	São Paulo
17:00 UTC−02	Cleiton Xavier 16'	Report		Stadium: Allianz Parque; Attendance: 31,967; Referee: Péricles Bassols Pegado Cortez (Pernambuco)

November 17 35	Atlético Mineiro	1–1	Palmeiras	Belo Horizonte
21:00 UTC−02	Leandro Donizete (yellow card) 9'; Pratto 58'; Luan (yellow card) 59'	Report	Gabriel Jesus (yellow card) 9', (goal) 25'; Vitor Hugo (yellow card) 22'; Dudu (yellow card) 56'; Egídio (yellow card) 63'	Stadium: Independência; Attendance: 12,919; Referee: Braulio da Silva Machado (Santa Catarina)

November 20 36	Palmeiras	1–0	Botafogo	São Paulo
17:00 UTC−02	Dudu 62'	Report	Emerson Silva (yellow card) 9'; Sassá (yellow card) 70'; Fernandes (yellow card) 76'; Carli (yellow card) 90+2'; Leandro (red card) 90+2'	Stadium: Allianz Parque; Attendance: 39,690; Referee: Elmo Alves Resende Cunha (Goiás)

November 27 37	Palmeiras	1–0	Chapecoense	São Paulo
17:00 UTC−02	Fabiano 25', (yellow card) 67'	Report	Bruno Rangel (yellow card) 21'; Marcelo (yellow card) 40'	Stadium: Allianz Parque; Attendance: 40,986; Referee: Anderson Daronco (Rio Grande do Sul)

December 11 38	Vitória	1–2	Palmeiras	Salvador
17:00 UTC−02	Marinho 12'; Zé Eduardo (yellow card) 20'	Report	Gabriel 15'; Alecsandro (yellow card) 39', (goal) 45'; Cleiton Xavier (yellow card) 40'; Thiago Santos (yellow card) 45+2'; Jailson (yellow card) 54'; Fabrício (yellow card) 72'; Matheus Sales (yellow card) 84'	Stadium: Barradão; Attendance: 34,987; Referee: Dewson Fernando Freitas da Silva (Pará)
Note: Match originally to be played in December 4 but after the tragic accident that occurred with Chapecoense the match was postponed to December 11.

=== Copa do Brasil ===
As a team that disputed the Copa Libertadores, Palmeiras entered in the round of 16.

==== Round of 16 ====
The draw for this round was held on August 2, 2016.

August 31 First leg	Palmeiras (São Paulo (state))	3–0	(Paraíba) Botafogo	São Paulo
19:30 UTC−03	Jean 57' (pen.); Allione (yellow card) 58'; Rafael Marques 62'; Tchê Tchê 80'	Report	Plínio (yellow card) 47'	Stadium: Allianz Parque; Attendance: 24,512; Referee: Dewson Fernando Freitas da Silva (Pará)

September 21 Second leg	Botafogo (Paraíba)	1–0 (1–3 agg.)	(São Paulo (state)) Palmeiras	João Pessoa
19:30 UTC−03	Sapé (yellow card) 40'; Carlinhos 75', (yellow card) 84'	Report	Gabriel (yellow card) 45'; Vitinho (yellow card) 73'; Matheus Sales (yellow card) 74'	Stadium: Almeidão; Attendance: 11,298; Referee: Jailson Macedo Freitas (Bahia)

==== Quarterfinal ====
The draw for this round was held on September 23, 2016.

September 28 First leg	Grêmio (Rio Grande do Sul)	2–1	(São Paulo (state)) Palmeiras	Porto Alegre
21:45 UTC−03	Kannemann (yellow card) 22'; Ramiro 32'; Pedro Rocha 44'; Marcelo Grohe (yellow card) 48'; Walace (yellow card) 68'	Report	Fabiano (yellow card) 17'; Mina (yellow card) 22'; Zé Roberto 50' (pen.); Vitor Hugo (yellow card) 55'	Stadium: Arena do Grêmio; Attendance: 26,589; Referee: Cláudio Francisco Lima e Silva (Sergipe)

October 19 Second leg	Palmeiras (São Paulo (state))	1–1 (2–3 agg.)	(Rio Grande do Sul) Grêmio	São Paulo
21:45 UTC−02	Thiago Martins 50'; Allione (red card) 64'; Edu Dracena (yellow card) 78'	Report	Edílson (yellow card) 40'; Douglas (yellow card) 41'; Geromel (yellow card) 59'; Everton 75', (yellow card) 76'	Stadium: Allianz Parque; Attendance: 29,991; Referee: Elmo Alves Resende Cunha (Goiás)

== Statistics ==
=== Overall statistics ===
As of December 11, 2016

Games played	65 (17 Campeonato Paulista, 6 Copa Libertadores, 38 Campeonato Brasileiro Série A, 4 Copa do Brasil)
Games won	35 (8 Campeonato Paulista, 2 Copa Libertadores, 24 Campeonato Brasileiro, 1 Copa do Brasil)
Games drawn	15 (4 Campeonato Paulista, 2 Copa Libertadores, 8 Campeonato Brasileiro, 1 Copa do Brasil)
Games lost	15 (5 Campeonato Paulista, 2 Copa Libertadores, 6 Campeonato Brasileiro, 2 Copa do Brasil)
Goals scored	108
Goals conceded	63
Goal difference	+45
Best result	4–0 (vs. River Plate – April 14, Copa Libertadores); 4–0 (vs. Atlético Paranaense – May 14, Campeonato Brasileiro); 4–0 (vs. Figueirense – June 30, Campeonato Brasileiro)
Worst result	1–4 (vs. Água Santa – March 27, Campeonato Paulista)
Yellow cards	162
Red cards	2
Top scorer	Gabriel Jesus (21 goals)
Clean sheets	25
Most clean sheets	Fernando Prass

=== Goalscorers ===
In italic players who left the team in mid-season.

Place	Position	Nationality	Number	Name	Campeonato Paulista	Copa Libertadores	Série A	Copa do Brasil	Total
1	FW	(Brazil)	33	Gabriel Jesus	5	4	12	0	21
2	FW	(Brazil)	29	Alecsandro	8	1	3	0	12
3	FW	(Brazil)	7	Dudu	3	0	6	0	9
4	MF	(Brazil)	17	Jean	0	1	6	1	8
5	FW	(Brazil)	19	Rafael Marques	3	0	1	1	5
5	DF	(Brazil)	4	Vitor Hugo	1	0	4	0	5
6	MF	(Argentina)	20	Allione	1	3	0	0	4
6	FW	(Argentina)	9	Cristaldo	2	1	1	0	4
6	FW	(Paraguay)	8	Barrios	2	1	1	0	4
6	DF	(Colombia)	26	Mina	0	0	4	0	4
6	FW	(Brazil)	23	Róger Guedes	0	0	4	0	4
6	DF	(Brazil)	31	Thiago Martins	1	0	2	1	4
6	MF	(Brazil)	10	Cleiton Xavier	0	0	4	0	4
7	FW	(Brazil)	14	Erik	0	0	3	0	3
7	MF	(Brazil)	28	Moisés	0	0	3	0	3
7	MF	(Brazil)	32	Tchê Tchê	0	0	2	1	3
8	MF	(Brazil)	27	Robinho	2	0	0	0	2
8	MF	(Brazil)	11	Zé Roberto	0	0	1	1	2
8	FW	(Brazil)	30	Leandro Pereira	0	0	2	0	2
9	DF	(Brazil)	6	Egídio	0	1	0	0	1
9	MF	(Brazil)	21	Thiago Santos	0	0	1	0	1
9	DF	(Brazil)	2	Fabiano	0	0	1	0	1
9	DF	(Brazil)	18	Gabriel	0	0	1	0	1
