= 2018 Sport Club do Recife season =

Sport Recife
2018 season
- Chairman: Arnaldo Barros
- Manager: Nelsinho Baptista; Claudinei Oliveira; Eduardo Baptista; Milton Mendes
- Stadium: Ilha do Retiro
- Série A: 18th
- Pernambucano: 3rd
- Copa do Brasil: Second round
- Top goalscorer: League: Gabriel (5); All: Anselmo and Marlone (7)
Home colours	Away colours	Third colours

The 2018 season was Sport Recife's 114th season in the club's history. Sport competed in the Campeonato Pernambucano, Série A and Copa do Brasil. The club chose not to compete in the regional cup, Copa do Nordeste.

== Squad ==
Note: Flags indicate national team as defined under FIFA eligibility rules; some limited exceptions apply. Players may hold more than one non-FIFA nationality.

No.	Pos.	Nation	Player
1	GK	BRA	Magrão
2	DF	BRA	Cláudio Winck
3	DF	BRA	Ronaldo Alves
4	DF	BRA	Durval (captain)
5	MF	BRA	Fellipe Bastos
7	MF	BRA	Andrigo
8	MF	BRA	Michel Bastos
9	FW	BRA	Hernane
10	MF	BRA	Marlone
13	MF	BRA	Ferreira
14	DF	BRA	Ernando
15	FW	BRA	Rafael Marques
17	DF	BRA	Max
18	MF	BRA	Adenilson
22	FW	BRA	Mateus Gonçalves
23	DF	BRA	Raul Prata
25	MF	BRA	Neto Moura
27	GK	BRA	Luan Polli

No.	Pos.	Nation	Player
29	MF	BRA	Lucas Ventura
30	MF	BRA	Gabriel
31	GK	BRA	Lucas
32	GK	BRA	Mailson
33	DF	BRA	Léo Ortiz
34	DF	BRA	Adryelson
37	DF	BRA	Elias
40	DF	BRA	Evandro
49	FW	BRA	Morato
55	MF	BRA	Deivid
56	DF	BRA	Sander
70	FW	BRA	Matheus Peixoto
77	MF	BRA	Marcão
88	MF	BRA	Jair
90	FW	BRA	Rogério
—	MF	BRA	Jadsom
—	MF	BRA	Marlon

== Statistics ==
=== Overall ===
Games played	54 (13 Pernambucano, 2 Copa do Brasil, 38 Série A, 1 Friendlies)
Games won	19 (6 Pernambucano, 1 Copa do Brasil, 11 Série A, 1 Friendlies)
Games drawn	15 (5 Pernambucano, 1 Copa do Brasil, 9 Série A, 0 Friendlies)
Games lost	20 (2 Pernambucano, 0 Copa do Brasil, 18 Série A, 0 Friendlies)
Goals scored	61
Goals conceded	68
Goal difference	–7
Best results (goal difference)	4–0 (H) v Vitória das Tabocas - Pernambucano - 2018.02.24
Worst result (goal difference)	0–4 (A) v Atlético Paranaense - Série A - 2018.10.14
Top scorer	Anselmo and Marlone (7)

Source: Sport Recife official website

=== Goalscorers ===
Place	Pos.	Nat.	No.	Name	Campeonato Pernambucano	Copa do Brasil	Série A	Friendlies	Total
1	MF	(Brazil)	8	Anselmo	4	1	2	0	7
=	MF	(Brazil)	10	Marlone	4	1	2	0	7
2	MF	(Brazil)	30	Gabriel	1	0	5	0	6
3	DF	(Brazil)	8	Michel Bastos	0	0	4	0	4
4	DF	(Brazil)	2	Cláudio Winck	0	0	3	0	3
=	MF	(Brazil)	22	Mateus Gonçalves	0	0	3	0	3
=	FW	(Brazil)	90	Rogério	0	0	3	0	3
=	MF	(Brazil)	11	Thomás Bedinelli	2	0	0	1	3
5	FW	(Brazil)	18	André	2	0	0	0	2
=	FW	(Brazil)	95	Carlos Henrique	0	0	2	0	2
=	MF	(Brazil)	36	Fabrício Bigode	1	1	0	0	2
=	FW	(Brazil)	9	Hernane	0	0	2	0	2
=	MF	(Brazil)	88	Jair	0	0	2	0	2
=	FW	(Brazil)	9	Leandro Pereira	0	2	0	0	2
=	MF	(Brazil)	39	Pablo Pardal	2	0	0	0	2
6	DF	(Brazil)	34	Adryelson	0	0	1	0	1
=	MF	(Brazil)	97	Everton Felipe	0	0	1	0	1
=	MF	(Brazil)	5	Fellipe Bastos	0	0	1	0	1
=	DF	(Brazil)	33	Léo Ortiz	1	0	0	0	1
=	FW	(Brazil)	15	Rafael Marques	0	0	1	0	1
=	DF	(Brazil)	56	Sander	0	0	0	1	1
=	FW	(Brazil)	63	Wildson Índio	1	0	0	0	1
				Own goals	1	0	3	0	4
				Total	19	5	35	2	61

=== Managers performance ===
Name	From	To	P	W	D	L	GF	GA	Avg%	Ref
(Brazil) Nelsinho Baptista	14 January 2018	23 April 2018	18	8	7	3	27	15	57%	
(Brazil) Claudinei Oliveira	29 April 2018	12 August 2018	16	5	4	7	18	23	39%	
(Brazil) Eduardo Baptista	18 August 2018	23 September 2018	8	1	1	6	2	12	16%	
(Brazil) Milton Mendes	30 September 2018	2 December 2018	12	5	3	4	14	18	50%	

=== Home record ===
Recife	São Lourenço da Mata
Ilha do Retiro	Arena Pernambuco
Capacity: 32,983	Capacity: 44,300
27 matches (15 wins 7 draws 5 losses)	1 match (1 draw)

=== Overview ===
Competition	First match	Last match	Starting round	Final position	Record							
Competition	First match	Last match	Starting round	Final position	Pld	W	D	L	GF	GA	GD	Win %
Série A	15 April	2 December	Matchday 1	18th	38	11	9	18	35	57	−22	28.95
Pernambucano	17 January	2 April	First stage	3rd	13	6	5	2	19	7	+12	46.15
Copa do Brasil	7 February	15 February	First round	32nd	2	1	1	0	5	4	+1	50.00
Friendlies	14 January	14 January	None	None	1	1	0	0	2	0	+2	100.00
Total					54	19	15	20	61	68	−7	35.19

Source: Competitions

== Friendlies ==
=== Taça Ariano Suassuna ===
14 January 2018	Sport (Brazil)	2–0	(Argentina) Atlético Tucumán	Recife
(UTC-3)	Sander 34'; Thomás Bedinelli 90+1'	Report		Stadium: Estádio Adelmar da Costa Carvalho (Ilha do Retiro); Attendance: 4,933; Referee: Luiz Sobral

== Official Competitions ==
=== Campeonato Pernambucano ===
==== First stage ====
17 January 2018 1	Flamengo de Arcoverde	0–0	Sport	Arcoverde
22:30 (UTC-3)		Report		Stadium: Estádio Municipal Áureo Bradley; Attendance: 3,000; Referee: Gleydson Ferreira Leite

20 January 2018 2	Sport	2–0	Afogados da Ingazeira	Recife
19:30 (UTC-3)	Thomás Bedinelli 51'; Gabriel 84'	Report		Stadium: Estádio Adelmar da Costa Carvalho (Ilha do Retiro); Attendance: 3,389; Referee: Sebastião Rufino Filho

24 January 2018 3	Náutico	3–0	Sport	São Lourenço da Mata
22:30 (UTC-3)	Wallace Pernambucano 12', 42'; Tharcysio 90+2'	Report		Stadium: Estádio Governador Carlos Wilson Campos (Arena Pernambuco); Attendance: 3,685; Referee: Péricles Bassols Cortez

29 January 2018 4	Sport	2–0	Pesqueira	Recife
21:00 (UTC-3)	André 8', 57'	Report		Stadium: Estádio Adelmar da Costa Carvalho (Ilha do Retiro); Attendance: 3,724; Referee: Nielson Nogueira Dias

3 February 2018 5	Central	1–1	Sport	Caruaru
17:30 (UTC-3)	Leandro 10'	Report	Marlone 77'	Stadium: Estádio Luiz José de Lacerda

18 February 2018 6	Sport	2–0	América	Recife
17:00 (UTC-3)	Fabrício Bigode 18'; Marlone 29'	Report		Stadium: Estádio Adelmar da Costa Carvalho (Ilha do Retiro); Attendance: 1,376

21 February 2018 7	Belo Jardim	0–0	Sport	Caruaru
21:45 (UTC-3)		Report		Stadium: Estádio Luiz José de Lacerda; Attendance: 722; Referee: Gleydson Ferreira Leite

24 February 2018 8	Sport	4–0	Vitória das Tabocas	Recife
18:30 (UTC-3)	Anselmo 35'; Leandro 40' (o.g.); Wildson 50'; Marlone 79'	Report		Stadium: Estádio Adelmar da Costa Carvalho (Ilha do Retiro); Attendance: 2,330; Referee: Nielson Nogueira Dias

4 March 2018 9	Salgueiro	1–1	Sport	Salgueiro
17:00 (UTC-3)	Piauí 82'	Report	Anselmo 76'	Stadium: Estádio Cornélio de Barros; Attendance: 1,491; Referee: Luiz Cláudio Sobral

7 March 2018 10	Sport	1–1	Santa Cruz	Recife
21:45 (UTC-3)	Thomás Bedinelli 26'	Report	Fabinho Alves 41'	Stadium: Estádio Adelmar da Costa Carvalho (Ilha do Retiro); Attendance: 13,218; Referee: Péricles Bassols

==== Quarter-final ====
14 March 2018	Sport	3–0	Santa Cruz	Recife
21:45 (UTC-3)	Marlone 2'; Anselmo 43', 71'	Report		Stadium: Estádio Adelmar da Costa Carvalho (Ilha do Retiro); Attendance: 15,180; Referee: Nielson Nogueira Dias

==== Semi-final ====
21 March 2018	Central	1–0	Sport	Caruaru
21:45 (UTC-3)	Leandro 58'	Report		Stadium: Estádio Luiz José de Lacerda; Attendance: 8,530; Referee: Ricardo Marques

==== Match for third place ====
2 April 2018	Sport	3–0	Salgueiro	Recife
20:00 (UTC-3)	Pablo Pardal 54', 79'; Léo Ortiz 75'	Report		Stadium: Estádio Adelmar da Costa Carvalho (Ilha do Retiro); Attendance: 932; Referee: Luiz Cláudio Sobral

==== Record ====
Final Position	Points	Matches	Wins	Draws	Losses	Goals For	Goals Away	Win%
3rd	23	13	6	5	2	19	7	59%

=== Copa do Brasil ===
==== First round ====
7 February 2018	Santos–AP	1–2	Sport	Macapá
19:30 (UTC-3)	Bruninho 85'	Report	Leandro Pereira 55', 87'	Stadium: Estádio Olímpico Milton de Souza Corrêa (Zerão); Attendance: 1,774; Referee: Joelson Nazareno Ferreira Cardoso

==== Second round ====
15 February 2018	Sport	3–3 (3–4 p)	Ferroviário	Recife
19:15 (UTC-3)	Anselmo 38'; Fabrício Bigode 55'; Marlone 71'	Report	Mazinho 76', 82'; Valdeci 86'	Stadium: Estádio Adelmar da Costa Carvalho (Ilha do Retiro); Attendance: 3,238; Referee: Rodrigo Batista Raposo
	Penalties
	Thomás (penalty scored); Léo Ortiz (penalty scored); Fabrício Bigode (penalty scored); Rogério (penalty missed); Marlone (penalty missed)		(penalty scored) Janeudo; (penalty scored) Valdeci; (penalty scored) Rodrigo Rodrigues; (penalty scored) Mazinho; (penalty missed) Mota

==== Record ====
Final Position	Points	Matches	Wins	Draws	Losses	Goals For	Goals Away	Win%
32nd	4	2	1	1	0	5	4	66%

=== Série A ===
15 April 2018 1	América–MG	3–0	Sport	Belo Horizonte
11:00 (UTC-3)	Serginho 1', 40'; Carlinhos 37'	Report		Stadium: Estádio Raimundo Sampaio (Independência); Attendance: 8,304; Referee: Sávio Pereira Sampaio

23 April 2018 2	Sport	1–1	Botafogo	Recife
20:00 (UTC-3)	Everton Felipe 85'	Report	Rodrigo Lindoso 90+2'	Stadium: Estádio Adelmar da Costa Carvalho (Ilha do Retiro); Attendance: 5,151; Referee: Rafael Traci

29 April 2018 3	Paraná	1–2	Sport	Curitiba
16:00 (UTC-3)	Jhonny Lucas 89'	Report	Rogério 7'; Marlone 48'	Stadium: Estádio Durival Britto e Silva (Vila Capanema); Attendance: 7,604; Referee: Daniel Nobre Bins

6 May 2018 4	Sport	2–0	Bahia	Recife
19:00 (UTC-3)	Douglas 44' (o.g.); Cláudio Winck 49'	Report		Stadium: Estádio Adelmar da Costa Carvalho (Ilha do Retiro); Attendance: 15,165; Referee: Grazianni Maciel Rocha

13 May 2018 5	Cruzeiro	2–0	Sport	Belo Horizonte
11:00 (UTC-3)	Dedé 45+1' de Arrascaeta 54'	Report		Stadium: Estádio Governador Magalhães Pinto (Mineirão); Attendance: 21,907; Referee: Bruno Arleu de Araujo

20 May 2018 6	Sport	1–1	Corinthians	São Lourenço da Mata
16:00 (UTC-3)	Carlos Henrique 62'	Report	Roger 55'	Stadium: Estádio Governador Carlos Wilson Campos (Arena Pernambuco); Attendance: 28,942; Referee: Wilton Pereira Sampaio

26 May 2018 7	Palmeiras	2–3	Sport	São Paulo
19:00 (UTC-3)	Keno 32'; Hyoran 81'	Report	Anselmo 50', 72'; Rafael Marques 86'	Stadium: Allianz Parque; Attendance: 25,947; Referee: Dewson Fernando Freitas da Silva

30 May 2018 8	Sport	3–2	Atlético Mineiro	Recife
19:30 (UTC-3)	Rogério 29'; Gabriel 67'; Michel Bastos 71'	Report	Cazares 48'; Ricardo Oliveira 65'	Stadium: Estádio Adelmar da Costa Carvalho (Ilha do Retiro); Attendance: 15,605; Referee: Wagner do Nascimento Magalhães

2 June 2018 9	Internacional	0–0	Sport	Porto Alegre
16:00 (UTC-3)		Report		Stadium: Estádio José Pinheiro Borda (Beira-Rio); Attendance: 28,320; Referee: Marcelo Aparecido Ribeiro de Souza

6 June 2018 10	Sport	1–0	Atlético Paranaense	Recife
21:00 (UTC-3)	Fellipe Bastos 46'	Report		Stadium: Estádio Adelmar da Costa Carvalho (Ilha do Retiro); Attendance: 17,841; Referee: Igor Junio Benevenuto de Oliveira

9 June 2018 11	Vasco da Gama	3–2	Sport	Rio de Janeiro
19:00 (UTC-3)	Yago Pikachu 18', 45+1'; Ramon Motta 90'	Report	Paulão 42' (o.g.); Michel Bastos 74'	Stadium: Estádio Vasco da Gama (São Januário); Attendance: 8,418; Referee: Sávio Pereira Sampaio

13 June 2018 12	Sport	0–0	Grêmio	Recife
19:30 (UTC-3)		Report		Stadium: Estádio Adelmar da Costa Carvalho (Ilha do Retiro); Attendance: 19,447; Referee: Ricardo Marques Ribeiro

18 July 2018 13	Ceará	1–0	Sport	Fortaleza
19:30 (UTC-3)	Arthur Cabral 53'	Report		Stadium: Estádio Presidente Vargas; Attendance: 15,197; Referee: Grazianni Maciel Rocha

22 July 2018 14	Sport	1–2	Fluminense	Recife
16:00 (UTC-3)	Gabriel 20'	Report	Pedro 18', 86'	Stadium: Estádio Adelmar da Costa Carvalho (Ilha do Retiro); Attendance: 11,119; Referee: Braulio da Silva Machado

26 July 2018 15	Vitória	1–0	Sport	Salvador
19:30 (UTC-3)	Erick 61'	Report		Stadium: Estádio Manoel Barradas (Barradão); Attendance: 5,706; Referee: Vinicius Gonçalves Dias Araújo

29 July 2018 16	Flamengo	4–1	Sport	Rio de Janeiro
16:00 (UTC-3)	Réver 14'; Lucas Paquetá 48'; Éverton Ribeiro 50'; Uribe 63'	Report	Cláudio Winck 44'	Stadium: Estádio Jornalista Mário Filho (Maracanã); Attendance: 58,817; Referee: Marcelo Aparecido Ribeiro de Souza

5 August 2018 17	Sport	1–1	Chapecoense	Recife
19:00 (UTC-3)	Carlos Henrique 90+2'	Report	Wellington Paulista 12'	Stadium: Estádio Adelmar da Costa Carvalho (Ilha do Retiro); Attendance: 6,787; Referee: Ricardo Marques Ribeiro

12 August 2018 18	Sport	1–3	São Paulo	Recife
16:00 (UTC-3)	Marlone 86'	Report	Diego Souza 30'; Nenê 52'; Tréllez 89'	Stadium: Estádio Adelmar da Costa Carvalho (Ilha do Retiro); Attendance: 16,050; Referee: Anderson Daronco

18 August 2018 19	Santos	3–0	Sport	Santos
16:00 (UTC-3)	Eduardo Sasha 1'; Rodrygo 82'; Victor Ferraz 84'	Report		Stadium: Estádio Urbano Caldeira (Vila Belmiro); Attendance: 10,991; Referee: Dewson Fernando Freitas da Silva

22 August 2018 20	Sport	0–2	América–MG	Recife
21:00 (UTC-3)		Report	Luan 47'; Rafael Moura 67'	Stadium: Estádio Adelmar da Costa Carvalho (Ilha do Retiro); Attendance: 16,425; Referee: Jailson Macedo Freitas

25 August 2018 21	Botafogo	2–0	Sport	Rio de Janeiro
21:00 (UTC-3)	Carli 61'; Aguirre 84'	Report		Stadium: Estádio Olímpico Nilton Santos (Engenhão); Attendance: 6,031; Referee: Sávio Pereira Sampaio

2 September 2018 22	Sport	1–0	Paraná	Recife
16:00 (UTC-3)	Gabriel 14'	Report		Stadium: Estádio Adelmar da Costa Carvalho (Ilha do Retiro); Attendance: 13,966; Referee: Emerson de Almeida Ferreira

5 September 2018 23	Bahia	2–0	Sport	Salvador
19:30 (UTC-3)	Gilberto 52'; Tiago Pagnussat 84'	Report		Stadium: Itaipava Arena Fonte Nova; Attendance: 13,816; Referee: Marcelo Aparecido Ribeiro de Souza

8 September 2018 24	Sport	0–0	Cruzeiro	Recife
16:00 (UTC-3)		Report		Stadium: Estádio Adelmar da Costa Carvalho (Ilha do Retiro); Attendance: 9,525; Referee: Vinícius Gonçalves Dias Araujo

16 September 2018 25	Corinthians	2–1	Sport	São Paulo
19:00 (UTC-3)	Jádson 58'; Danilo Avelar 88'	Report	Hernane 21'	Stadium: Arena Corinthians; Attendance: 20,901; Referee: Rodrigo D'alonso Ferreira

23 September 2018 26	Sport	0–1	Palmeiras	Recife
18:00 (UTC-3)		Report	Willian 81'	Stadium: Estádio Adelmar da Costa Carvalho (Ilha do Retiro); Attendance: 18,681; Referee: Paulo Roberto Alves Junior

30 September 2018 27	Atlético Mineiro	5–2	Sport	Belo Horizonte
16:00 (UTC-3)	Elias 8'; Fábio Santos 26'; Emerson Royal 28'; Cazares 29'; Ricardo Oliveira 69'	Report	Leonardo Silva 6' (o.g.); Michel Bastos 56'	Stadium: Estádio Raimundo Sampaio (Independência); Attendance: 22,654; Referee: Leandro Bizzio Marinho

5 October 2018 28	Sport	2–1	Internacional	Recife
19:00 (UTC-3)	Adryelson 78'; Mateus Gonçalves 87'	Report	Nicolás López 66'	Stadium: Estádio Adelmar da Costa Carvalho (Ilha do Retiro); Attendance: 9,979; Referee: André Luiz de Freitas Castro

14 October 2018 29	Atlético Paranaense	4–0	Sport	Curitiba
19:00 (UTC-3)	Thiago Heleno 47'; Bergson 55', 83'; Rony 85'	Report		Stadium: Estádio Joaquim Américo Guimarães (Arena da Baixada); Attendance: 9,139; Referee: Wagner Reway

20 October 2018 30	Sport	2–1	Vasco da Gama	Recife
19:00 (UTC-3)	Mateus Gonçalves 25'; Cláudio Winck 67'	Report	Fabrício 39'	Stadium: Estádio Adelmar da Costa Carvalho (Ilha do Retiro); Attendance: 13,860; Referee: Wilton Pereira Sampaio

27 October 2018 31	Grêmio	3–4	Sport	Porto Alegre
16:30 (UTC-3)	Matheus Henrique 38'; Juninho Capixaba 51'; Thonny Anderson 59'	Report	Jair 7', 64'; Mateus Gonçalves 29'; Gabriel 52'	Stadium: Arena do Grêmio; Attendance: 12,165; Referee: Dewson Fernando Freitas da Silva

5 November 2018 32	Sport	1–0	Ceará	Recife
20:00 (UTC-3)	Gabriel 52'	Report		Stadium: Estádio Adelmar da Costa Carvalho (Ilha do Retiro); Attendance: 25,002; Referee: Anderson Daronco

11 November 2018 33	Fluminense	0–0	Sport	Rio de Janeiro
19:00 (UTC-3)		Report		Stadium: Estádio Jornalista Mário Filho (Maracanã); Attendance: 12,252; Referee: Flávio Rodrigues de Souza

14 November 2018 34	Sport	0–0	Vitória	Recife
21:45 (UTC-3)		Report		Stadium: Estádio Adelmar da Costa Carvalho (Ilha do Retiro); Attendance: 22,652; Referee: Anderson Daronco

18 November 2018 35	Sport	0–1	Flamengo	Recife
17:00 (UTC-3)		Report	Willian Arão 82'	Stadium: Estádio Adelmar da Costa Carvalho (Ilha do Retiro); Attendance: 26,005; Referee: Raphael Claus

22 November 2018 36	Chapecoense	2–1	Sport	Chapecó
21:00 (UTC-3)	Leandro Pereira 4', 7'	Report	Michel Bastos 22'	Stadium: Arena Condá; Attendance: 12,384; Referee: Leandro Pedro Vuaden

26 November 2018 37	São Paulo	0–0	Sport	São Paulo
20:00 (UTC-3)		Report		Stadium: Estádio Cícero Pompeu de Toledo (Morumbi); Attendance: 15,235; Referee: André Luiz de Freitas Castro

2 December 2018 38	Sport	2–1	Santos	Recife
17:00 (UTC-3)	Rogério 84'; Hernane 90+1'	Report	Rodrygo 90+2'	Stadium: Estádio Adelmar da Costa Carvalho (Ilha do Retiro); Attendance: 23,451; Referee: Anderson Daronco

==== Record ====
Final Position	Points	Matches	Wins	Draws	Losses	Goals For	Goals Away	Win%
18th	39(*)	38	11	9	18	35	57	34%

(*) Sport was penalized with the loss of three points for late wage payments of midfielder Gabriel.
