= Carlos Henrique =

Carlos Henrique is a Portuguese masculine blended given name from the German root names Karl and Haimirich. Notable people referred to by this name include the following:

- Carlos Henrique Alves Pereira, known as Carlos Henrique or simply Carlos, (born 1995), Brazilian football player
- Carlos Henrique Barbosa Augusto, known as Henrique (footballer, born 1989), Brazilian football player
- Carlos Henrique Carneiro Marinho, known as Carlinhos (footballer, born 1983), Brazilian football player
- Carlos Henrique Casimiro, known as Casemiro, (born 1992), Brazilian football player
- Carlos Henrique Costas Campos, known as Carlos Henrique (born 1999), Brazilian jiu-jitsu practitioner
- Carlos Henrique de Brito Cruz (born 1956) Brazilian physicist
- Carlos Henrique de Jesus Souza, known as Carlos Henrique, (born 2001), Brazilian football player
- Carlos Henrique de Oliveira, known as Carlinhos (footballer, born January 1986), Brazilian footballer
- Carlos Henrique de Senna Fernandes Basto, known as Carlos Henrique Basto or Charles Henrique de Basto, (1890 – 1944), Portuguese businessman
- Carlos Henrique Dias, known as Kim (footballer, born 1980), Brazilian football player
- Carlos Henrique dos Santos Costa, known as Lula (footballer, born 1992), Brazilian football player
- Carlos Henrique dos Santos Souza, known as Henrique (footballer, born 1983), Brazilian football player
- Carlos Henrique Elias, known as Carlos "Caique" Elias (born 1957), Brazilian Jiu-Jitsu master
- Carlos Henrique França Freires, known as França (footballer, born 1995), Brazilian football player
- Carlos Henrique Hernández, known as Carlos Hernández (pitcher, born 1980) (born 1980), Venezuelan baseball player
- Carlos Henrique Kroeber, known as Carlos Kroeber (1934–1999), Brazilian actor
- Carlos Henrique Manzato dos Santos, known as Cahê, (born 1982), Brazilian football player
- Carlos Henrique Raimundo Rodrigues, known as Henrique (footballer, born 1976) (born 1976), Brazilian football player
- Carlos Henrique Raposo, known as Carlos Kaiser (footballer), (born 1963), Brazilian football player
- Carlos Henrique Rodrigues do Nascimento, known as Olívia (basketball), (born 1974), Brazilian basketball player
- Carlos Henrique Schroder (born 1959), Brazilian journalist and executive
