= Carlos Augusto =

Carlos Augusto may refer to:

- Carlos Augusto Alves Santana (born 1947), Mexican-American guitarist also known as Santana
- Carlos Augusto Ayres de Freitas Britto (born 1942), former chief justice of the Supreme Court of Brazil
- Carlos Augusto Bertoldi (born 1985), Brazilian footballer also known as Ticão
- Carlos Augusto Bertulani, Brazilian theoretical physicist and professor
- Carlos Augusto Campos (born 1978), Brazilian sprint canoer
- Carlos Augusto de Oliveira (born 1974), Brazilian film director
- Carlos Augusto Filho (born 1986), Brazilian mixed martial artist and kickboxer also known as Guto Inocente
- Carlos Augusto Lobatón Espejo (born 1980), Peruvian footballer (midfielder)
- Carlos Augusto Ochoa Mendoza (born 1978), Mexican footballer
- Carlos Augusto Peres (born 1963), Brazilian field biologist
- Carlos Augusto Ribeiro Canário (1918–1990), Portuguese footballer
- Carlos Augusto Rivera Guerra (born 1986), Mexican singer
- Carlos Augusto Soares da Costa Faria Carvalhal (born 1965), Portuguese football manager and retired footballer
- Carlos Augusto Vásquez (born 1982), Venezuelan baseball player
- Carlos Augusto Zambrano (born 1989), Peruvian footballer (defender)
- Carlos Augusto Zopolato Neves (born 1999), Brazilian footballer
- Carlos Henrique Barbosa Augusto (born 1989), Brazilian footballer also known as Henrique
