= Rafael Marques (footballer, born May 1983) =

Brazilian footballer

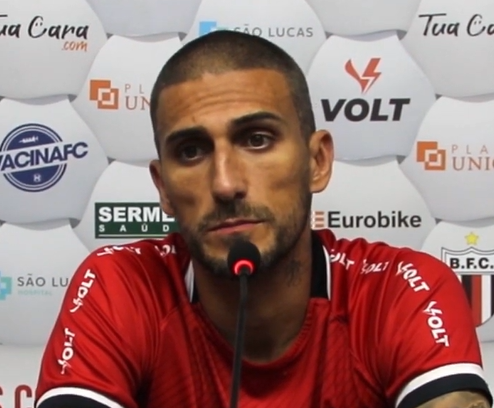
- Rafael Marques in 2021

Personal information
- Full name: Rafael Marques Mariano
- Date of birth: 27 May 1983 (age 43)
- Place of birth: Araraquara, São Paulo, Brazil
- Height: 1.90 m (6 ft 3 in)
- Position: Forward

Youth career
- –2001: Ferroviária
- 2003: Ponte Preta

Senior career*
Years	Team	Apps	(Gls)
2001	Ferroviária		
2002	Independente de Limeira		
2003	Campinas	18	(14)
2003	Ponte Preta	1	(1)
2004	Palmeiras	11	(0)
2005	Inter de Limeira	14	(5)
2005	Marília	25	(8)
2005–2006	Samsunspor	30	(7)
2006–2009	Manisaspor	70	(24)
2009–2012	Omiya Ardija	83	(24)
2012–2013	Botafogo	62	(14)
2014–2015	Henan Jianye	21	(5)
2015	→ Palmeiras (loan)	48	(13)
2016–2017	Palmeiras	30	(5)
2017–2018	Cruzeiro	21	(2)
2018	Sport Recife	22	(1)
2018	São Caetano	11	(1)
2019	Figueirense	28	(5)
2020	Ventforet Kofu	23	(2)
2021	Botafogo-SP	15	(0)
2022	Primavera	12	(2)

Managerial career
- 2023–2025: Primavera (assistant)
- 2023: Primavera (interim)
- 2024: Primavera (interim)
- 2026: Primavera
- * Club domestic league appearances and goals

Rafael Marques Mariano (born 27 May 1983), known as Rafael Marques, is a Brazilian football coach and former player who played as a forward.

Marques gained Turkish citizenship with the name Rafet El when playing for Manisaspor.

== Career ==
=== Early career ===
Born in Araraquara, São Paulo, Rafael Marques started his senior career with hometown side Ferroviária. He later played for Campinas FC, before joining Série A side Ponte Preta; initially a member of the under-20 team, he made his debut and scored his first goal for the club on 8 October in a 2–2 home draw against Atlético Paranaense.

In 2004 Rafael Marques signed for Palmeiras, but acted mainly as a backup to León Muñoz and Vágner Love during his spell. He subsequently represented Inter de Limeira, which he left on 18 April 2005. Two days later, he joined Marília.

=== Turkey ===
In 2005 Rafael Marques moved abroad for the first time in his career, signing with Samsunspor. He made his Süper Lig debut on 11 September in a 1–1 home draw against Manisaspor, and scored his first goal late in the month in a 2–1 home loss against Galatasaray.

In August 2006, after his team's relegation, Rafael Marques agreed to a contract with Manisaspor, suffering the same fate in his second season. During the 2008–09 campaign, he contributed with twelve goals as his side was crowned champions and returned to the first division at first attempt.

=== Omiya Ardija ===
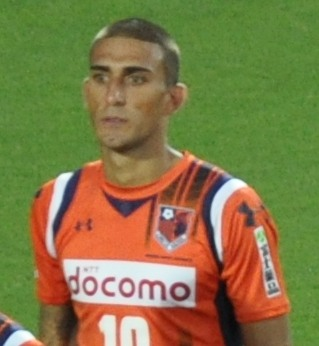
Rafael Marques playing for Omiya Ardija in 2011

In August 2009, Rafael Marques was announced at Omiya Ardija. He scored regularly for the side during his spell, including a ten-goal mark during the 2011 season; highlights included a brace in a 3–1 away defeat of Kashiwa Reysol on 25 September 2011.

=== Botafogo and Henan Jianye ===
On 10 July 2012, Rafael Marques signed a three-and-a-half-year contract with Botafogo back in his home country. After spending his first six months without scoring, he finished the 2013 Campeonato Brasileiro Série A with ten goals, being the club's top goalscorer.

On 21 January 2014, Rafael Marques switched teams and countries again, joining Henan Jianye in the Chinese Super League.

=== Palmeiras ===
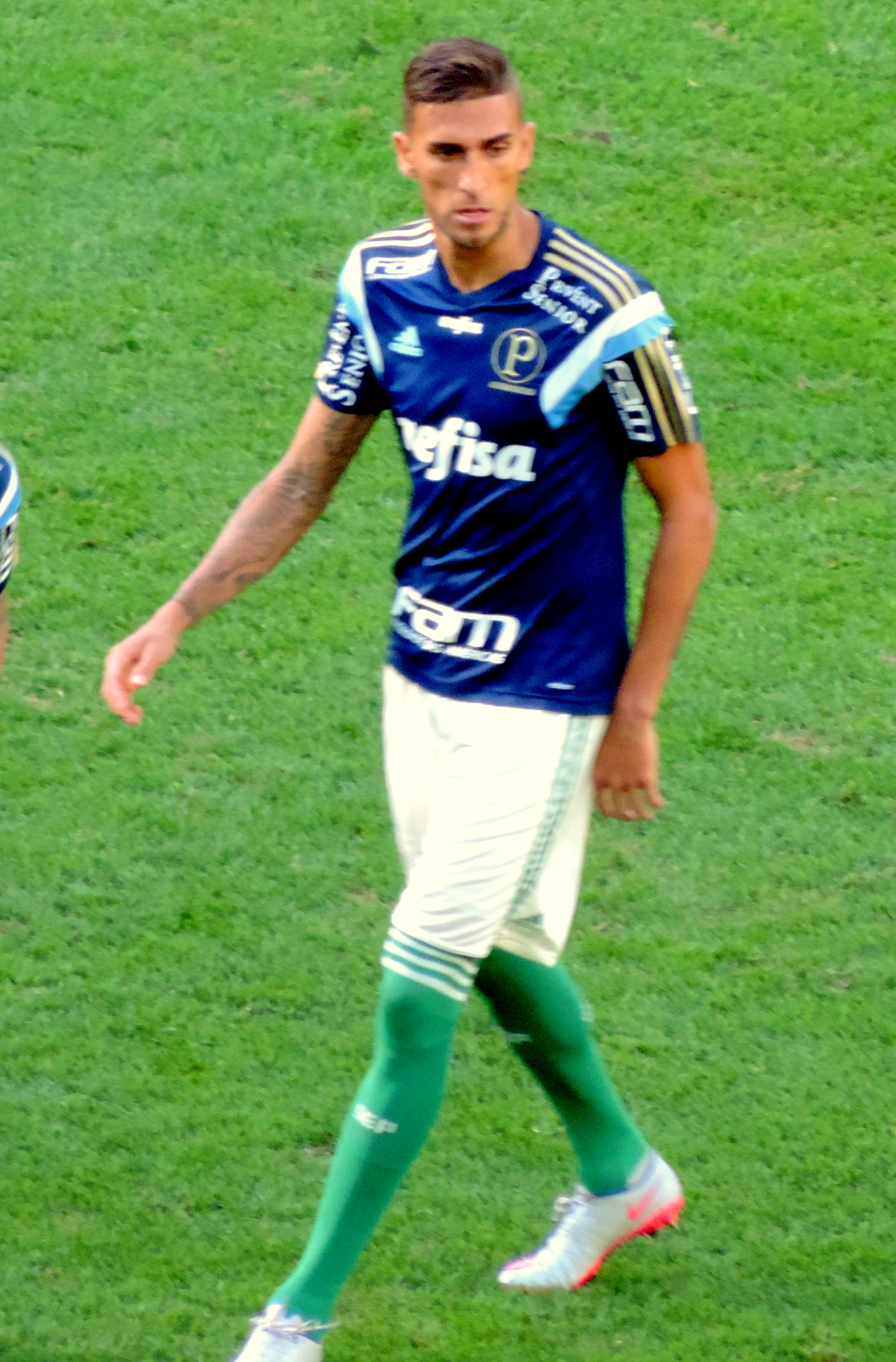
Rafael Marques with Palmeiras in 2015

On 12 January 2015, Rafael Marques returned to Palmeiras on a one-year loan deal. A regular starter, he featured in 32 league matches and scored seven goals during the year.

On 13 January 2016, Rafael Marques signed a permanent two-year deal with Verdão. However, he would spend the campaign as a backup to Róger Guedes and Gabriel Jesus as his side lifted the league trophy after 22 years.

In March 2017, after the arrival of Miguel Borja, Rafael Marques was being deemed surplus to requirements by manager Eduardo Baptista, being transfer-listed by the club.

=== Cruzeiro ===
On 13 May 2017, Rafael Marques signed an 18-month contract with fellow top-tier club Cruzeiro, with Mayke moving in the opposite direction on loan.

=== Later career ===
In December 2018, after a spell with Sport Recife, Rafael Marques joined Campeonato Paulista side São Caetano. On 24 April 2019, he was presented at Figueirense.

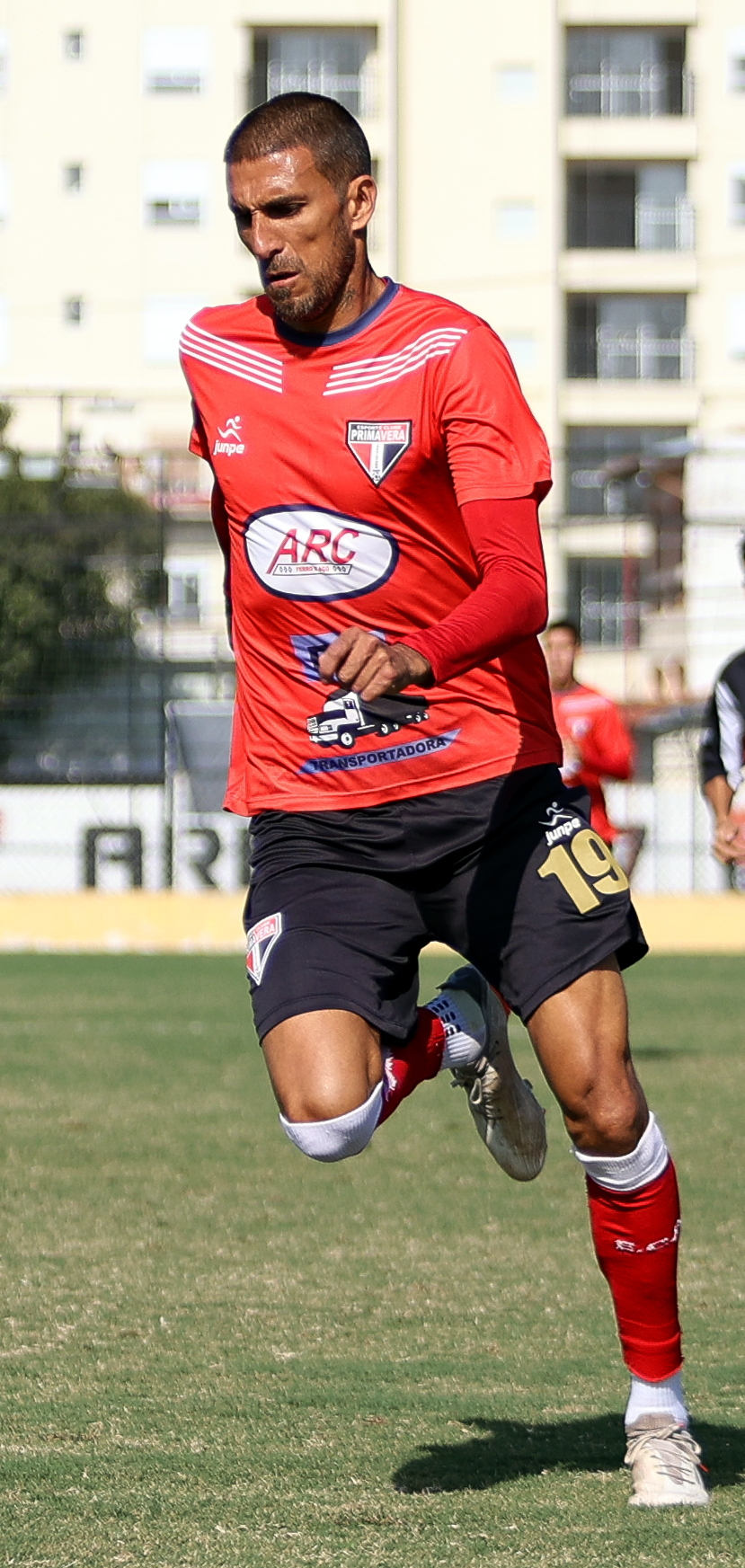
Rafael Marques playing for Primavera in 2022

On 6 February 2021, after one season at J2 League side Ventforet Kofu, Rafael Marques was announced at Botafogo-SP. On 6 January of the following year, he moved to Primavera, and retired with the side at the age of 39 in November 2022.

== Coaching career ==
Immediately after retiring, Rafael Marques became an assistant coach at his last club Primavera. In March 2024, he became an interim head coach after Roger Silva left the club.

Back to the assistant role after the arrival of Fernando Marchiori, Rafael Marques was appointed as permanent head coach of Primavera on 2 December 2025, shortly after Marchiori's departure. He resigned on 11 August 2026, after nearly four years at the club.

== Career statistics ==
Appearances and goals by club, season and competition
Club	Season	League			State League		Cup		Continental		Other		Total	
Club	Season	Division	Apps	Goals	Apps	Goals	Apps	Goals	Apps	Goals	Apps	Goals	Apps	Goals
Campinas	2003	Paulista B2	—		18	14	—		—		—		18	14
Ponte Preta	2003	Série A	1	1	—		—		—		—		1	1
Palmeiras	2004	Série A	6	0	5	0	2	1	—		—		13	1
Inter de Limeira	2005	Paulista	—		14	5	—		—		—		14	5
Marília	2005	Série B	25	8	—		—		—		—		25	8
Samsunspor	2005–06	Süper Lig	29	6	—		7	2	—		—		36	8
Samsunspor	2006–07	TFF First League	1	1	–		—		—		—		1	1
Samsunspor	Total		30	7	—		7	2	—		—		37	9
Manisaspor	2006–07	Süper Lig	14	8	—		6	1	—		—		20	9
Manisaspor	2007–08	Süper Lig	27	4	—		5	1	—		—		32	5
Manisaspor	2008–09	TFF First League	29	12	—		5	0	—		—		34	12
Manisaspor	Total		70	24	—		16	2	—		—		86	26
Omiya Ardija	2009	J. League 1	14	4	—		—		—		2 (Note: Appearances in Emperor's Cup)	0	16	4
Omiya Ardija	2010	J. League 1	23	8	—		4	2	—		2	3	29	13
Omiya Ardija	2011	J. League 1	31	10	—		1	0	—		1	0	33	10
Omiya Ardija	2012	J. League 1	15	2	—		4	0	—		–		19	2
Omiya Ardija	Total		83	24	—		9	2	—		5	3	97	29
Botafogo	2012	Série A	15	0	—		—		2 (Note: Appearances in Copa Sudamericana)	0	—		17	0
Botafogo	2013	Série A	37	10	10	4	9	5	—		—		56	19
Botafogo	Total		52	10	10	4	9	5	2	0	—		73	19
Henan Jianye	2014	Chinese Super League	21	5	—		1	0	—		—		22	5
Palmeiras	2015	Série A	32	7	16	6	8	2	—		—		56	15
Palmeiras	2016	Série A	19	1	10	3	3	1	2 (Note: Appearances in Copa Libertadores)	0	—		34	5
Palmeiras	2017	Série A	0	0	1	1	0	0	0	0	—		1	1
Palmeiras	Total		51	8	27	10	11	3	2	0	—		91	21
Cruzeiro	2017	Série A	19	1	—		—		—		—		19	1
Cruzeiro	2018	Série A	0	0	2	1	0	0	0	0	—		2	1
Cruzeiro	Total		19	1	2	1	0	0	0	0	—		21	2
Sport Recife	2018	Série A	22	1	—		—		—		—		22	1
São Caetano	2019	Série D	—		11	1	—		—		—		11	1
Figueirense	2019	Série B	28	5	—		—		—		1 (Note: Appearance(s) in Recopa Catarinense)	1	29	6
Ventforet Kofu	2020	J2 League	23	2	—		—		—		—		23	2
Botafogo-SP	2021	Série D	8	0	7	0	—		—		5 (Note: Appearance(s) in Copa Paulista)	0	20	0
Primavera	2022	Paulista A2	—		12	2	—		—		8	1	20	3
Career total			439	96	106	37	55	15	4	0	19	5	623	153

== Honours ==
Manisaspor

- TFF First League: 2008–09

Botafogo

- Campeonato Carioca: 2013

Palmeiras

- Copa do Brasil: 2015
- Campeonato Brasileiro Série A: 2016
