= Carlos Henrique (footballer, born 2001) =

Brazilian footballer

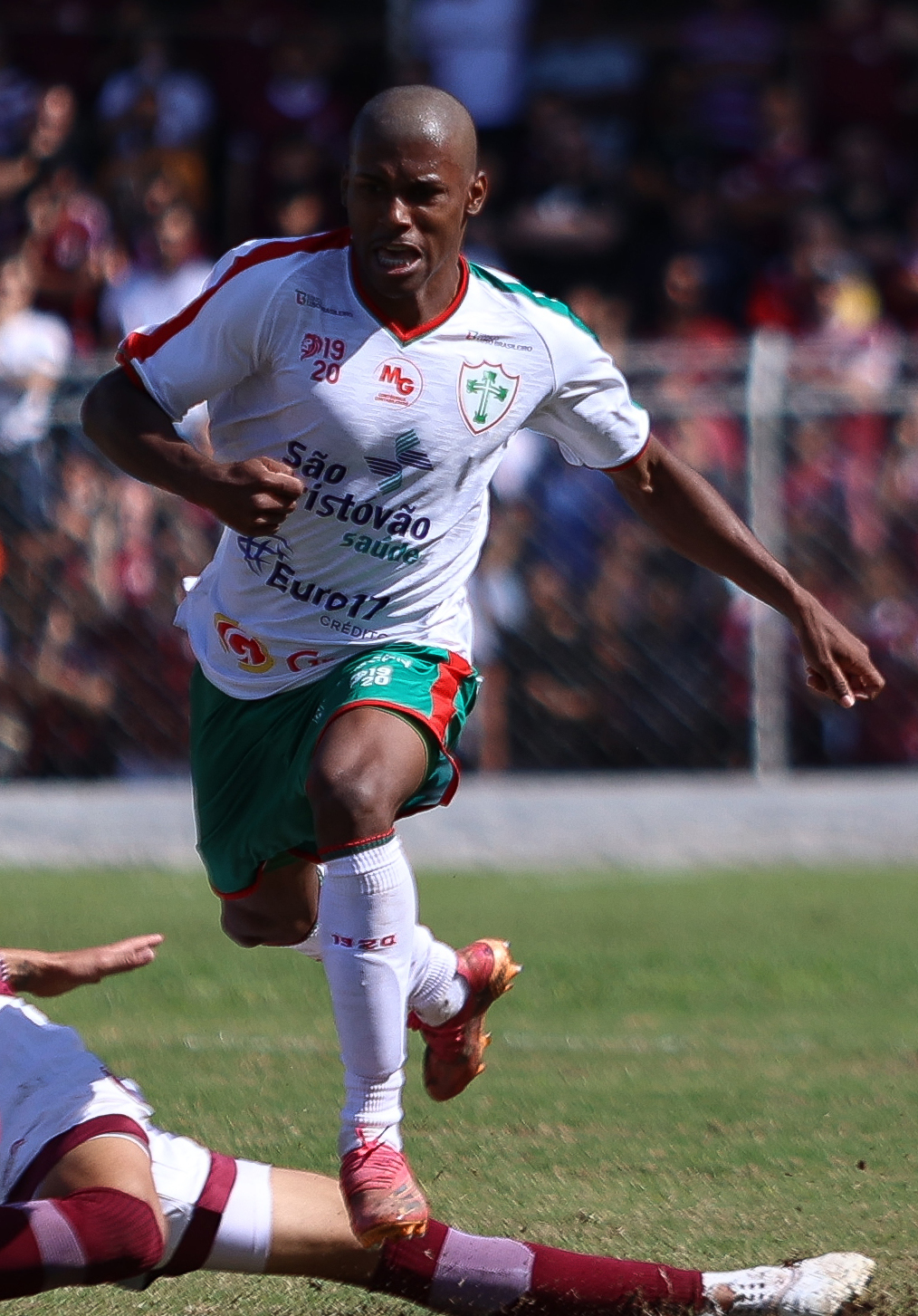
- Carlos Henrique playing for Portuguesa in 2022

Personal information
- Full name: Carlos Henrique de Jesus Souza
- Date of birth: 27 February 2001 (age 25)
- Place of birth: Ponto Novo, Brazil
- Height: 1.72 m (5 ft 8 in)
- Positions: Left-back; winger

Team information
- Current team: São José-SP
- Number: 28

Youth career
- 2017–2018: Osvaldo Cruz
- 2019–2021: Atlético Goianiense
- 2021–2022: Corinthians
- 2022: → Portuguesa (loan)

Senior career*
Years	Team	Apps	(Gls)
2018	Osvaldo Cruz	2	(0)
2020–2021	Atlético Goianiense	6	(1)
2021	→ Anapolina (loan)	0	(0)
2022	Corinthians	0	(0)
2022	→ Portuguesa (loan)	11	(0)
2023	Grêmio Anápolis	11	(0)
2023	CEOV	11	(0)
2024	Monte Azul	6	(0)
2024	Trindade	7	(0)
2024	Portuguesa	0	(0)
2025	ASA	5	(0)
2025	Água Santa	6	(0)
2026	São José-SP	14	(0)
2026	Treze	11	(0)
2026	→ São José-SP (loan)	0	(0)
2027–	São José-SP	0	(0)
- * Club domestic league appearances and goals as of 13:51, 31 August 2026 (UTC)

Carlos Henrique de Jesus Souza (born 27 February 2001), known as Carlos Henrique, is a Brazilian footballer who plays as either a left-back or a left winger for São José-SP.

== Career ==
Born in Ponto Novo, Bahia, Carlos Henrique began his career with Osvaldo Cruz and made his senior debut in the 2018 Campeonato Paulista Segunda Divisão. He moved to Atlético Goianiense shortly after, and returned to the under-20 squad.

After starting the 2020 campaign on loan at Anapolina, where he did not feature in any matches, Carlos Henrique returned to Dragão in July of that year, before making his debut for the latter club 25 January 2021, starting in a 5–1 home routing of Sinop for the 2020 Copa Verde. He scored his first senior goal three days later, but in a 5–3 Campeonato Goiano away loss to CRAC.

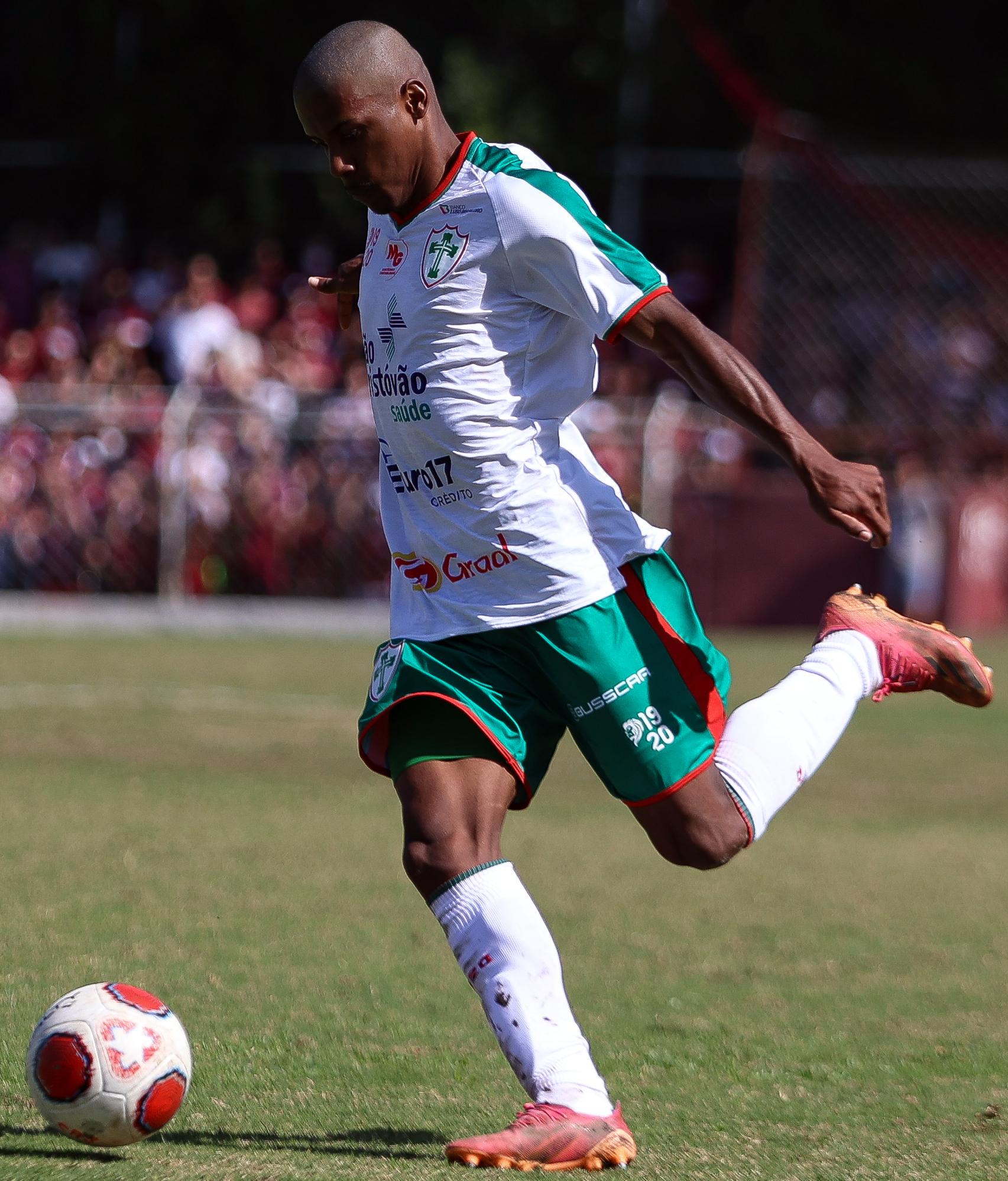
Carlos Henrique playing for Portuguesa in 2022

On 6 August 2021, Carlos Henrique was released by Atlético, and signed a one-year deal with Corinthians twenty days later; he was initially assigned to the under-20s. On 25 November, however, he was loaned to Portuguesa.

After impressing with the under-20s in the 2022 Copa São Paulo de Futebol Júnior, Carlos Henrique became a regular starter for Lusa in the season, winning the Campeonato Paulista Série A2, but left in October of that year after his contract was not renewed. On 11 December, he agreed to a deal with Grêmio Anápolis.

In April 2023, Carlos Henrique joined Série D side CEOV. On 8 December, he returned to the São Paulo state and signed for Monte Azul, but played only six matches before moving back to Goiás with Trindade the following 22 April.

On 28 June 2024, Carlos Henrique returned to Portuguesa for the Copa Paulista. He was announced at ASA on 26 November, but moved to Água Santa on 4 April 2025.

On 6 November 2025, São José-SP announced the signing of Carlos Henrique for the upcoming season. He joined Treze the following 24 April, and despite the club's elimination from the 2026 Série D, he still renewed his contract until the end of 2027 on 3 August.

On 28 August 2026, Carlos Henrique returned to the Águia do Vale for the state cup knockout rounds. After helping the club to win their first-ever title in the competition, he signed a permanent deal until 2028 on 16 November.

== Career statistics ==
As of 31 August 2026

Club	Season	League			State League		Cup		Continental		Other		Total	
Club	Season	Division	Apps	Goals	Apps	Goals	Apps	Goals	Apps	Goals	Apps	Goals	Apps	Goals
Anapolina	2020	Goiano	—		0	0	—		—		—		0	0
Atlético Goianiense	2020	Série A	0	0	1	1	—		—		3 (Note: Appearance(s) in Copa Verde)	0	4	1
Atlético Goianiense	2021	Série A	0	0	5	0	0	0	0	0	—		5	0
Atlético Goianiense	Total		0	0	6	1	0	0	0	0	3	0	9	1
Portuguesa	2022	Paulista A2	—		11	0	—		—		11 (Note: Appearance(s) in Copa Paulista)	0	22	0
Grêmio Anápolis	2023	Goiano	—		11	0	—		—		—		11	0
CEOV	2023	Série D	11	0	4	0	—		—		5 (Note: Appearance(s) in Copa FMF)	0	20	0
Monte Azul	2024	Paulista A2	—		6	0	—		—		—		6	0
Trindade	2024	Goiano 2ª Divisão	—		7	0	—		—		—		7	0
Portuguesa	2024	Paulista	—		—		—		—		11	2	11	2
ASA	2025	Série D	—		5	0	—		—		7 (Note: Two appearances in Copa do Nordeste, five appearances and one goal in Copa Alagoas)	1	12	1
Água Santa	2025	Série D	6	0	—		—		—		—		6	0
São José-SP	2026	Paulista A2	—		14	0	—		—		6	0	20	0
São José-SP	2027	Paulista A2	—		0	0	—		—		—		0	0
São José-SP	Total		—		14	0	—		—		6	0	20	0
Treze	2026	Série D	11	0	—		—		—		—		11	0
Career total			28	0	64	1	0	0	0	0	43	3	135	4

== Honours ==
Portuguesa

- Campeonato Paulista Série A2: 2022

São José-SP

- Copa Paulista: 2026
