= Ponto Novo =

Municipality of Bahia, Brazil

Coordinates: 10°51′43″S 40°08′02″W

- Municipality
- Flag Coat of arms
- Interactive map of Ponto Novo
- Country: Brazil
- Region: Nordeste
- State: Bahia

Population (2020)
  - Total: 14,819
- Time zone: UTC−3 (BRT)

Ponto Novo is a municipality in the state of Bahia in the North-East region of Brazil. It was raised to municipality status in 1985, the area being taken out of the municipality of Caldeirão Grande.

== See also ==
- List of municipalities in Bahia
