= Pablo Pardal =

Brazilian footballer

Personal information
- Full name: Pablo Silva de Lara
- Date of birth: 21 April 1999 (age 27)
- Place of birth: Pão de Açúcar, Brazil
- Height: 1.70 m (5 ft 7 in)
- Position: Midfielder

Team information
- Current team: Mineiros

Youth career
- 2013–2019: Sport Recife
- 2017: → Cruzeiro (loan)

Senior career*
Years	Team	Apps	(Gls)
2018–2021	Sport Recife	10	(2)
2020	→ Cascavel (loan)	14	(1)
2022	Caldense	4	(0)
2022	Fortaleza B		
2022	Vitória das Tabocas		
2023	Madureira	11	(0)
2023	Cruzeiro-AL	13	(2)
2023–	Mineiros		

International career^{‡}
2017	Brazil U20	1	(0)
- * Club domestic league appearances and goals as of 16 July 2023 ‡ National team caps and goals as of 10:22, 21 May 2018 (UTC)

Pablo Silva de Lara (born 21 April 1999), commonly known as Pablo Pardal, is a Brazilian footballer who plays as a midfielder for Mineiros.

== Career statistics ==
=== Club ===
As of 4 April 2019.

Club	Season	League			Cup		Continental		Other		Total	
Club	Season	Division	Apps	Goals	Apps	Goals	Apps	Goals	Apps	Goals	Apps	Goals
Sport Recife	2018	Série A	1	0	0	0	–		1 (Note: Appearances in the Campeonato Pernambucano)	2	2	2
Sport Recife	2019	Série B	0	0	0	0	–		2	0	2	0
Career total			1	0	0	0	0	0	3	2	4	2
