= Raphinha (footballer, born 1993) =

Brazilian footballer

Personal information
- Full name: Raphael David Thomaz
- Date of birth: 21 April 1993 (age 33)
- Place of birth: Porto Alegre, Brazil
- Height: 1.76 m (5 ft 9 in)
- Position: Defender

Team information
- Current team: Rio São Paulo

Youth career
- Internacional

Senior career*
Years	Team	Apps	(Gls)
2012–2016	Internacional	14	(0)
2015	→ Luverdense (loan)	3	(0)
2017	São Paulo-RS	3	(0)
2017	Aimoré	0	(0)
2018	Bangu	0	(0)
2018	Ypiranga	4	(0)
2019–	Rio São Paulo		
2020	→ Bagé (loan)		
- * Club domestic league appearances and goals

Raphael David Thomaz (born 21 April 1993), commonly known as Raphinha, is a Brazilian professional footballer who plays as a defender for Rio São Paulo.

== Career statistics ==
Appearances and goals by club, season and competition
Club	Season	League			National cup		State league		Other cups		Total	
Club	Season	Division	Apps	Goals	Apps	Goals	Apps	Goals	Apps	Goals	Apps	Goals
Internacional	2013	Série A	0	0	0	0	3 (Note: Appearances in Campeonato Gaúcho)	0	0	0	3	0
Internacional	2014	Série A	0	0	0	0	6	0	0	0	6	0
Internacional	Total		0	0	0	0	9	0	0	0	9	0
Luverdense (loan)	2015	Série B	3	0	2	0	0	0	4 (Note: Appearances in Copa Verde)	0	9	0
Internacional	2016	Série A	2	0	0	0	2	0	2 (Note: Appearances in Primeira Liga)	0	6	0
São Paulo-RS	2017	Série D	3	0	0	0	0	0	0	0	3	0
Ypiranga	2018	Série C	4	0	0	0	0	0	0	0	4	0
Career total			12	0	2	0	11	0	6	0	31	0
