= Mateus Gonçalves =

Brazilian footballer (born 1994)

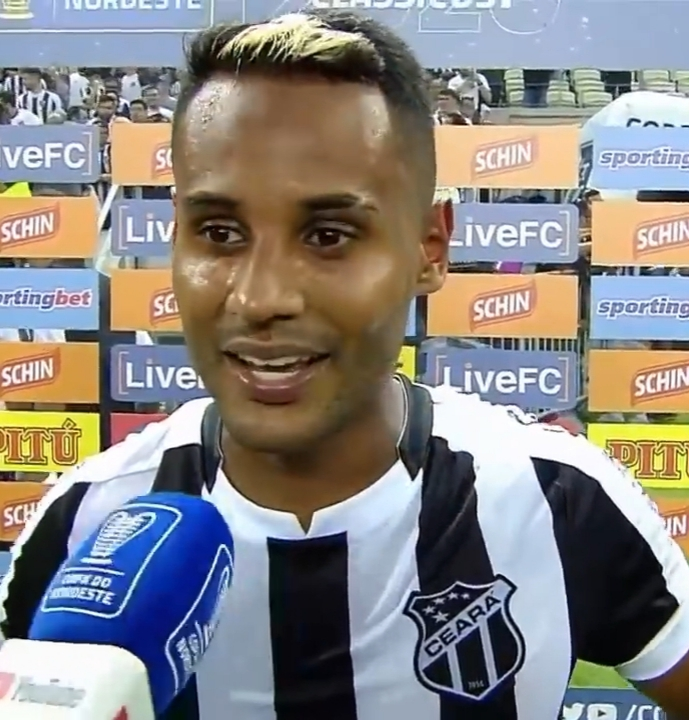

Personal information
- Full name: Mateus Gonçalves Martins
- Date of birth: 28 September 1994 (age 32)
- Place of birth: Belo Horizonte, Brazil
- Height: 1.68 m (5 ft 6 in)
- Position: Winger

Team information
- Current team: Athletic

Youth career
- São Paulo
- 2013–2014: Palmeiras

Senior career*
Years	Team	Apps	(Gls)
2014–2015	Vitória Guimarães B	0	(0)
2015	Santa Rita	4	(0)
2015–2017	Coras	28	(10)
2016	→ Pachuca (loan)	2	(0)
2017	→ Chiapas (loan)	11	(0)
2017–2019	Zacatepec	0	(0)
2017	→ Toluca (loan)	5	(1)
2018	→ Tijuana (loan)	5	(2)
2018	→ Sport Recife (loan)	13	(3)
2019	→ Fluminense (loan)	7	(0)
2019	→ Ceará (loan)	24	(4)
2020	Ceará	21	(1)
2021–2022	Cerro Porteño	28	(1)
2023	América Mineiro	3	(0)
2023–2024	Vitória	35	(3)
2024	Goiás	8	(1)
2025–	Athletic	10	(1)
- * Club domestic league appearances and goals as of 18 December 2025

Mateus Gonçalves Martins (born 28 September 1994), known as Mateus Gonçalves, is a Brazilian professional footballer who plays as a winger for Athletic.
