= Agustín Allione =

Argentine footballer (born 1994)

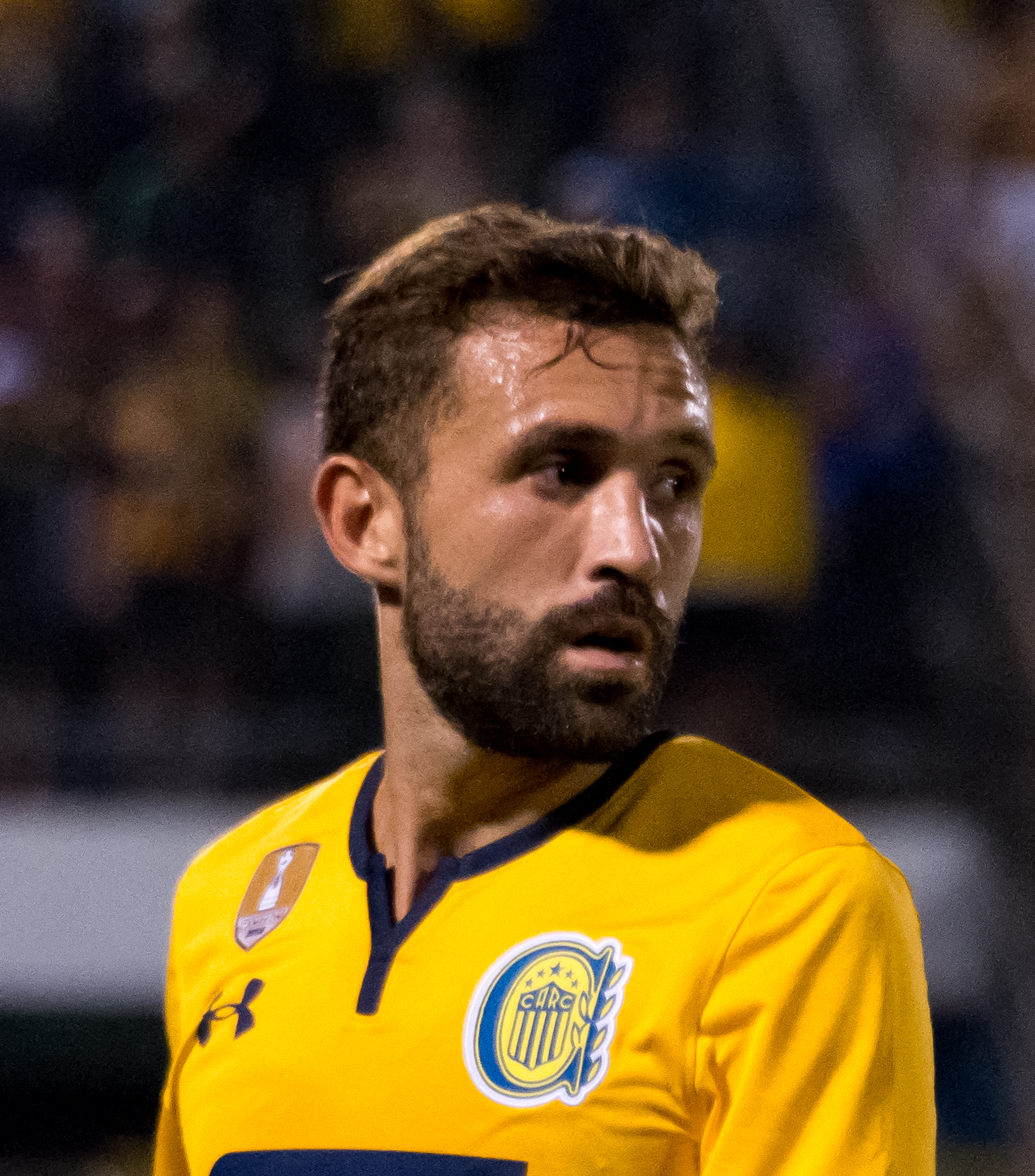

Personal information
- Full name: Agustín Lionel Allione
- Date of birth: 28 October 1994 (age 32)
- Place of birth: Amenabar, Argentina
- Height: 1.70 m (5 ft 7 in)
- Positions: Attacking midfielder; winger

Team information
- Current team: Deportivo Morón

Youth career
- Vélez Sarsfield

Senior career*
Years	Team	Apps	(Gls)
2011–2014	Vélez Sarsfield	56	(5)
2014–2020	Palmeiras	52	(1)
2017–2018	→ Bahia (loan)	68	(4)
2019	→ Rosario Central (loan)	11	(1)
2020	→ Central Córdoba (loan)	0	(0)
2021–2022	Temperley	57	(7)
2023–	Deportivo Morón	13	(0)

International career
2011	Argentina U17	8	(0)
2013–2015	Argentina U20	2	(1)
- * Club domestic league appearances and goals as of 18:00, 3 August 2022 (UTC)

Agustín Lionel Allione (born 28 October 1994) is an Argentine footballer who plays as an attacking midfielder for Deportivo Morón.

== Club career ==
Allione made his debut in the Argentine Primera División playing for Vélez Sarsfield, entering the field in a 2–1 victory over Atlético Rafaela for the 2012 Clausura.

The right winger made 14 appearances during Vélez's title-winning 2012 Inicial, including four as a starter. He played a key role in the 17th fixture against All Boys, assisting Lucas Pratto in the first goal of a 2–0 victory that left his team as sole leader of the standings.

== International career ==
Alliones played for the Argentina national under-17 football team in the 2011 South American Under-17 Football Championship and the 2011 FIFA Under-17 World Cup.

== Career statistics ==
As of match played 28 May 2017

Club	Season	League		National Cup		Continental		State League		Other		Total	
Club	Season	Apps	Goals	Apps	Goals	Apps	Goals	Apps	Goals	Apps	Goals	Apps	Goals
Vélez Sarsfield	2011–12	2	0	1	0	0	0	0	0	0	0	3	0
Vélez Sarsfield	2012–12	26	0	0	0	9	1	0	0	0	0	35	1
Vélez Sarsfield	2013–14	28	5	1	0	6	1	0	0	0	0	35	6
Vélez Sarsfield	Total	56	5	2	0	15	2	0	0	0	0	73	7
Palmeiras	2014	15	0	2	0	–		0	0	1	0	18	0
Palmeiras	2015	12	0	5	1	–		9	0	2	1	28	2
Palmeiras	2016	7	0	3	0	4	3	9	1	0	0	23	4
Palmeiras	Total	34	0	10	1	4	3	18	1	3	1	69	6
Bahia (loan)	2017	26	0	–		–		7	2	10	1	43	3
Bahia (loan)	2018	10	1	1	0	2	0	7	0	8	0	28	1
Bahia (loan)	Total	36	1	1	0	2	0	14	2	18	1	71	4
Career total		126	6	13	1	21	5	32	3	21	2	213	17

== Honours ==
Vélez Sársfield

- Argentine Primera División: 2012 Inicial, 2012–13 Superfinal
- Supercopa Argentina: 2013

Palmeiras

- Copa do Brasil: 2015
- Campeonato Brasileiro Série A: 2016

Bahia

- Copa do Nordeste: 2017
