= Rodrigo (footballer, born 1994) =

Brazilian footballer

Personal information
- Full name: Rodrigo Vasconcelos Oliveira
- Date of birth: 11 February 1994 (age 32)
- Place of birth: Ituiutaba, Brazil
- Height: 1.76 m (5 ft 9 in)
- Position: Defensive midfielder

Team information
- Current team: Maranhão
- Number: 22

Youth career
- Goiás

Senior career*
Years	Team	Apps	(Gls)
2012–2015	Goiás	64	(4)
2012	→ Aparecidense (loan)	5	(0)
2016–2023	Tombense	98	(4)
2016	→ Palmeiras (loan)	1	(0)
2017	→ Sport Recife (loan)	30	(0)
2018	→ Atlético Goianiense (loan)	11	(0)
2018	→ Juventude (loan)	9	(0)
2019	→ Paraná (loan)	0	(0)
2023	→ Brusque (loan)	14	(0)
2024	Ituano	32	(9)
2025	Figueirense	6	(9)
2026	Velo Clube	6	(0)
2026–	Maranhão	5	(0)
- * Club domestic league appearances and goals as of 10 November 2026

Rodrigo Vasconcelos Oliveira (born 11 February 1994), simply known as Rodrigo, is a Brazilian footballer who plays for Maranhão as a defensive midfielder.

== Club career ==
Born in Ituiutaba, Minas Gerais, Rodrigo graduated with Goiás' youth setup, and made his senior debuts while on loan at Aparecidense in 2012. In 2014, he was promoted to the main squad by manager Claudinei Oliveira.

On 15 May 2014 Rodrigo made his first team – and Série A – debut, coming on as a late substitute in a 2–0 home win against Botafogo. After the departure of Amaral to Palmeiras, he was made a starter ahead of the 2015 season.
