= Matheus Sales =

Brazilian footballer

Personal information
- Full name: Matheus de Sales Cabral
- Date of birth: 13 May 1995 (age 31)
- Place of birth: Guarulhos, Brazil
- Height: 1.78 m (5 ft 10 in)
- Position: Defensive midfielder

Team information
- Current team: Botafogo-SP
- Number: 16

Youth career
- São Paulo
- 2009–2014: Palmeiras

Senior career*
Years	Team	Apps	(Gls)
2014–2021	Palmeiras	28	(0)
2017	→ Bahia (loan)	26	(0)
2018	→ América Mineiro (loan)	5	(0)
2018	→ Figueirense (loan)	23	(1)
2019	→ Novorizontino (loan)	7	(0)
2019–2020	→ Coritiba (loan)	61	(2)
2021–2024	Coritiba	40	(2)
2022	→ Goiás (loan)	35	(1)
2023	→ Atlético Goianiense (loan)	34	(0)
2024–2025	Ulsan HD	12	(0)
2025	Mirassol	0	(0)
2026–	Botafogo-SP	38	(0)
- * Club domestic league appearances and goals as of 18 November 2026

Matheus de Sales Cabral (born 13 May 1995), known as Matheus Sales, is a Brazilian footballer who plays as a defensive midfielder for Botafogo-SP.

== Club career ==
Born in Guarulhos, São Paulo, Matheus Sales joined Palmeiras' youth setup in 2009, after being approved in a trial. In 2014, after being strongly linked to Internacional, he signed a new four-year deal with the club.

Matheus Sales made his first team – and Série A – debut on 25 October 2015, starting in a 0–2 home loss against Sport Recife. In the year's Copa do Brasil, he started in both legs of the final, earning plaudits for his performance on the second match.

In January 2024, Sales signed for K League 1 club Ulsan HD.

== Career statistics ==
As of match played 25 November 2023

Club	Season	League			State League		National Cup		Continental		Other		Total	
Club	Season	Division	Apps	Goals	Apps	Goals	Apps	Goals	Apps	Goals	Apps	Goals	Apps	Goals
Palmeiras	2014	Série A	0	0	—		0	0	—		—		0	0
Palmeiras	2015	Série A	4	0	0	0	3	0	—		—		7	0
Palmeiras	2016	Série A	11	0	7	0	1	0	2	0	—		21	0
Palmeiras	Total		15	0	7	0	4	0	2	0	0	0	28	0
Bahia (loan)	2017	Série A	14	0	8	0	0	0	0	0	4	0	26	0
América Mineiro (loan)	2018	Série A	—		5	0	0	0	—		—		5	0
Figueirense (loan)	2018	Série B	23	1	—		—		—		—		23	1
Novorizontino (loan)	2019	Campeonato Paulista	—		7	0	—		—		—		7	0
Coritiba (loan)	2019	Série B	30	0	—		0	0	—		—		30	0
Coritiba (loan)	2020	Série A	21	0	9	2	1	0	—		—		31	2
Coritiba (loan)	Total		51	0	9	2	1	0	0	0	0	0	61	2
Coritiba	2021	Série B	27	2	7	1	2	0	—		—		36	3
Coritiba	2022	Série A	0	0	7	0	—		—		—		7	0
Coritiba	Total		27	2	14	1	2	0	0	0	0	0	43	3
Goiás (loan)	2022	Série A	31	0	—		4	1	—		—		35	1
Atlético Goianiense (loan)	2023	Série B	28	0	6	0	2	0	—		—		36	0
Total			189	3	56	3	13	1	2	0	4	0	264	7

== Honours ==
Palmeiras

- Copa do Brasil: 2015
- Campeonato Brasileiro Série A: 2016

Bahia

- Copa do Nordeste: 2017
