= Jean (footballer, born 1986) =

Brazilian footballer

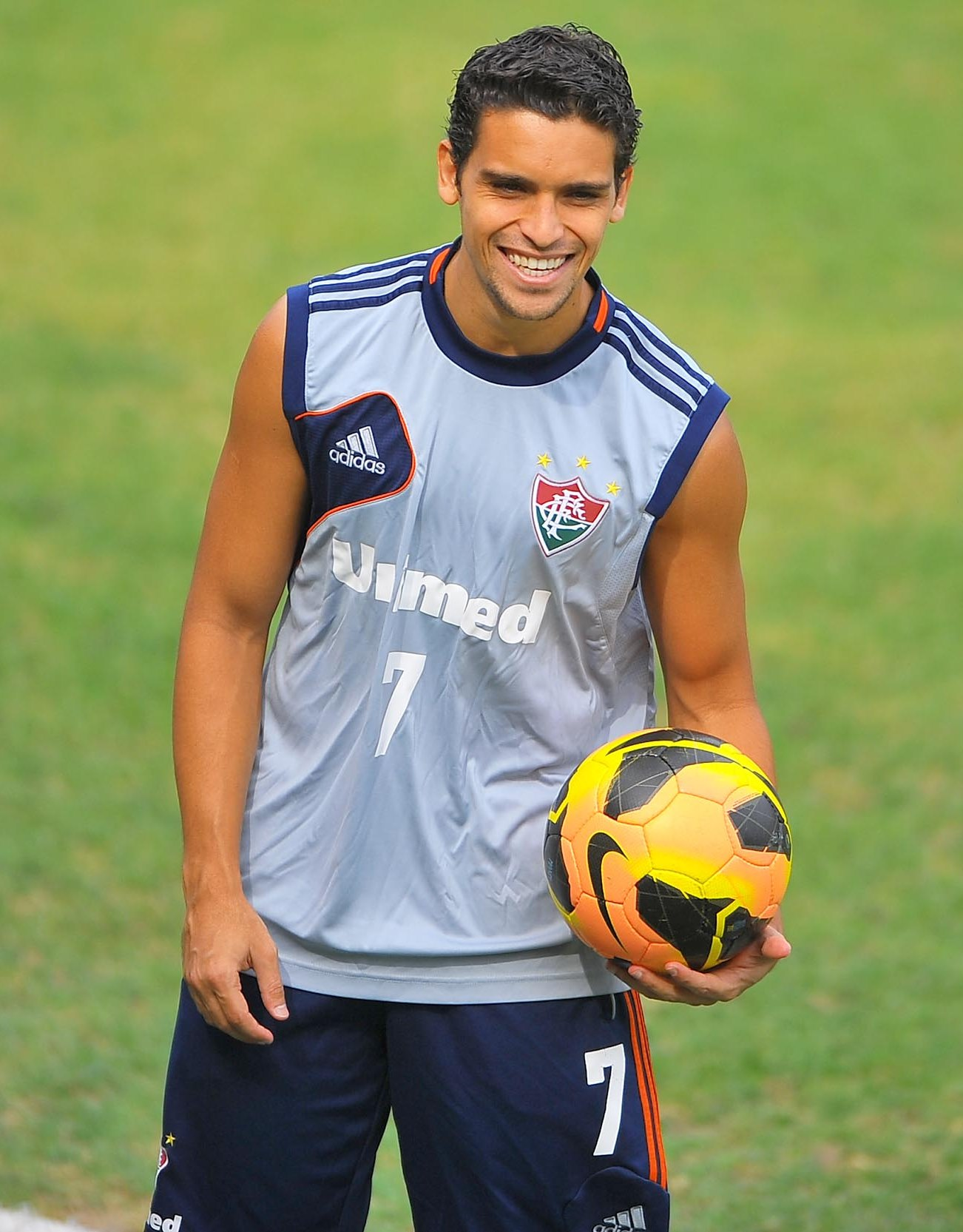
- Jean in 2013

Personal information
- Full name: Jean Raphael Vanderlei Moreira
- Date of birth: 24 June 1986 (age 40)
- Place of birth: Campo Grande, Brazil
- Height: 1.70 m (5 ft 7 in)
- Positions: Right-back; defensive midfielder

Team information
- Current team: FC Pantanal (MS)

Youth career
- 2001–2002: Operário-MS
- 2002–2005: São Paulo

Senior career*
Years	Team	Apps	(Gls)
2004–2012	São Paulo	206	(12)
2006	→ América (loan)	20	(3)
2007	→ Marília (loan)	22	(2)
2008	→ Penafiel (loan)	10	(1)
2012–2015	Fluminense	217	(19)
2016–2021	Palmeiras	126	(12)
2020	→ Cruzeiro (loan)	9	(1)
2023–2024	Retrô	8	(0)
2025–	FC Pantanal (MS)		

International career
2012–2013	Brazil	6	(0)
- * Club domestic league appearances and goals as of 3 October 2025

Jean Raphael Vanderlei Moreira (born 24 June 1986), simply known as Jean, is a Brazilian professional footballer who plays as a defensive midfielder and a right-back for FC Pantanal (MS).

== Career ==
Born in Campo Grande, Mato Grosso do Sul, Jean made his professional debut for São Paulo in a 2–1 away defeat to Santos in the Campeonato Brasileiro on 17 July 2005.

On 13 November 2012, Jean was called up, by Mano Menezes, for Brazil that will play Superclásico de las Américas, making, then, his début for Seleção.

== Career statistics ==
=== Club ===
As of 7 December 2018

Appearances and goals by club, season and competition
Club	Season	League		National cup		Continental		Other		Total	
Club	Season	Apps	Goals	Apps	Goals	Apps	Goals	Apps	Goals	Apps	Goals
São Paulo	2004	0	0	—		6	0	—		6	0
São Paulo	2005	1	0	—		1	0	—		2	0
São Paulo	2008	23	2	—		—		—		23	2
São Paulo	2009	30	2	—		8	0	19	0	57	2
São Paulo	2010	34	2	—		12	0	17	1	63	3
São Paulo	2011	28	1	7	0	2	0	20	1	57	4
São Paulo	Total	116	7	7	0	29	0	56	2	208	9
Penafiel (loan)	2009	9	1	—		—		—		9	1
Fluminense	2012	32	2	—		6	0	17	0	58	2
Fluminense	2013	25	2	1	0	10	0	11	3	47	5
Fluminense	2014	35	2	5	0	2	0	16	1	58	3
Fluminense	2015	32	4	5	0	—		17	5	54	9
Fluminense	Total	124	10	11	0	18	0	61	9	214	19
Palmeiras	2016	34	6	2	1	5	1	12	0	53	8
Palmeiras	2017	20	2	3	0	5	0	11	2	39	4
Palmeiras	2018	18	0	1	0	4	0	—		23	0
Palmeiras	Total	72	8	6	1	14	1	23	2	115	12
Career total		321	26	24	1	61	1	140	13	546	41

=== International ===
Games for Brazilian team

	Date	Place	Result	Opponent	Goals	Competition
1.	21 November 2012	La Bombonera, Buenos Aires, Argentina	1(4)–2(3)	Argentina	0	Superclásico de las Américas
2.	6 February 2013	Wembley Stadium, London, England	1–2	England	0	Friendly
3.	21 March 2013	Stade de Genève, Genève, Switzerland	2–2	Italy	0	Friendly

== Honours ==
São Paulo

- Campeonato Brasileiro Série A: 2008

Fluminense

- Campeonato Carioca: 2012
- Taça Guanabara: 2012
- Campeonato Brasileiro Série A: 2012

Palmeiras

- Campeonato Brasileiro Série A: 2016, 2018

Brazil

- Superclásico de las Américas: 2012
- FIFA Confederations Cup: 2013

Individual

- Bola de Prata: 2016
- Campeonato Brasileiro Série A Team of the Year: 2012, 2016
