= Caldeirão Grande =

Municipality of Bahia State, Brazil

- Municipality of Bahia, Brazil
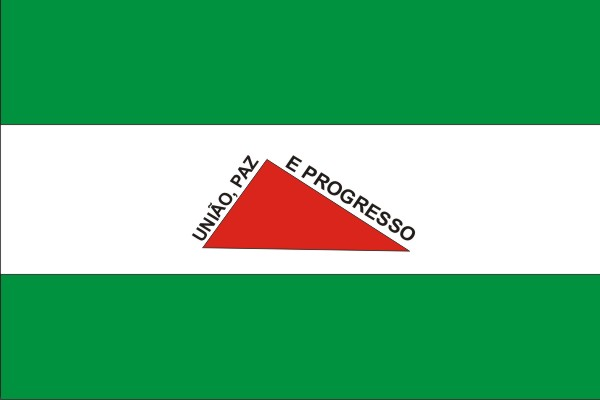
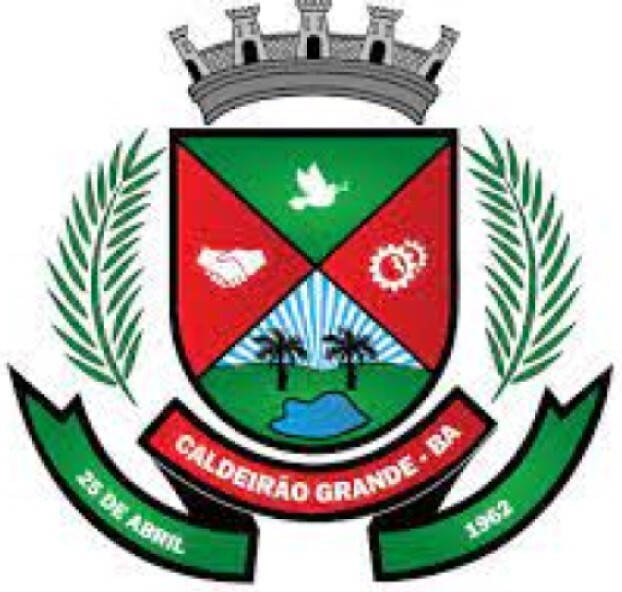
- Flag Coat of arms

- Location of Caldeirão Grande in Bahia

- Location within Brazil Location within South America
- Coordinates: 11°01′12″S 40°18′10″W
- Country: Brazil
- Region: Northeast
- State: Bahia
- Founded: 25 April 1962

Government
  - Mayor: Pedro Henrique Araujo Bezerra (PP) (2025-2028)
  - Vice Mayor: Marcio de Araujo Santana (UNIÃO) (2025-2028)

Area
  - Total: 458.311 km^{2} (176.955 sq mi)
- Elevation: 430 m (1,410 ft)

Population (2022)
  - Total: 13,080
  - Density: 28.54/km^{2} (73.9/sq mi)
- Demonym: Caldeirão-grandense (Brazilian Portuguese)
- Time zone: UTC-03:00 (Brasília Time)
- Postal code: 44750-000
- HDI (2010): 0.573 – medium
- Website: caldeiraogrande.ba.gov.br

Caldeirão Grande is a Brazilian municipality in the state of Bahia. Its estimated population as of 2020 was 13,391 inhabitants, up from 12,491 inhabitants in 2010. It has an area of 458.31 square kilometres (176.95 sq mi). As of 2020, the mayor was Candido Pereira da Guirra Filho.

== See also ==
- List of municipalities in Bahia
