= Henrique (footballer, born 1989) =

Brazilian footballer

Personal information
- Full name: Carlos Henrique Barbosa Augusto
- Date of birth: May 29, 1989 (age 37)
- Place of birth: São Paulo, Brazil
- Height: 1.79 m (5 ft 10 1/2 in)
- Position: Defensive midfielder

Youth career
- São Caetano

Senior career*
Years	Team	Apps	(Gls)
2008–2009	São Caetano		
2008	→ Taubaté (loan)		
2009	→ Ulbra (loan)		
2009	→ Campinenese (loan)	25	(1)
2010	Grêmio	1	(0)
2010–2011	Grêmio Prudente	0	(0)
- * Club domestic league appearances and goals as of October 16, 2011

Carlos Henrique Barbosa Augusto, also known as Henrique (born May 29, 1989 in São Paulo), is a Brazilian footballer who plays as a defensive midfielder. He played in Série B for Campinense.

== Career ==
Henry began his career at São Caetano. He was loaned to Taubaté, Ulbra (now University) and Campinense. In 2010, he moved to the Guild. On January 4 this year, was officially unveiled by the club gaucho, as new hire. The first wheel has signed a contract lasting one year on loan at São Caetano.

=== Career statistics ===
(Correct as of October 16, 2010)

Club	Season	State League		Brazilian Série A		Copa do Brasil		Copa Libertadores		Copa Sudamericana		Total	
Club	Season	Apps	Goals	Apps	Goals	Apps	Goals	Apps	Goals	Apps	Goals	Apps	Goals
Grêmio	2010	0	0	0	0	0	0	-	-	-	-	1	0
Total		0	0	0	0	0	0	-	-	-	-	1	0
