= 2019 Sport Club do Recife season =

Sport Recife
2019 season
- Chairman: Milton Bivar
- Manager: Milton Cruz; Guto Ferreira
- Stadium: Ilha do Retiro
- Série B: Runners-up
- Pernambucano: Champions (42nd title)
- Copa do Brasil: First round
- Top goalscorer: League: Guilherme (17); All: Hernane (24)
| Home colours | Away colours | Third colours |

The 2019 season was Sport Recife's 115th season in the club's history. Sport competed in the Campeonato Pernambucano, Série B and Copa do Brasil. The club chose not to compete in the regional cup, Copa do Nordeste, for the second year in a row.

== Squad ==
Note: Flags indicate national team as defined under FIFA eligibility rules; some limited exceptions apply. Players may hold more than one non-FIFA nationality.

| No. | Pos. | Nation | Player |
|---|---|---|---|
| 1 | GK | BRA | Magrão |
| 2 | DF | BRA | Norberto |
| 3 | DF | BRA | Cleberson |
| 4 | DF | BRA | Durval (captain) |
| 5 | MF | BRA | Ronaldo |
| 6 | DF | BRA | Guilherme Lazaroni |
| 7 | FW | BRA | Luan |
| 9 | FW | BRA | Hernane |
| 10 | MF | CRO | Sammir |
| 11 | FW | BRA | Guilherme |
| 12 | DF | BRA | Sander |
| 15 | DF | BRA | Rafael Thyere |
| 17 | FW | BRA | Ezequiel |
| 18 | MF | BRA | Thallyson |
| 19 | FW | BRA | Élton |
| 20 | FW | BRA | Alisson Farias |

| No. | Pos. | Nation | Player |
|---|---|---|---|
| 21 | MF | BRA | Pedro Maranhão |
| 23 | DF | BRA | Raul Prata |
| 25 | MF | BRA | Kaio |
| 27 | GK | BRA | Luan Polli |
| 28 | MF | BRA | João Igor |
| 29 | MF | BRA | Leandrinho |
| 31 | GK | BRA | Lucas Ferreira |
| 32 | GK | BRA | Mailson |
| 34 | DF | BRA | Adryelson |
| 35 | MF | BRA | Charles |
| 36 | DF | BRA | Chico |
| 37 | FW | BRA | Juninho |
| 39 | MF | BRA | Pablo Pardal |
| 44 | DF | BRA | Renato Oliveira |
| 90 | DF | BRA | Bruno Peres (on loan from Roma) |
| 91 | FW | BRA | Hyuri |

== Statistics ==
=== Overall ===
| Games played | 54 (13 Pernambucano, 1 Copa do Brasil, 38 Série B, 2 Friendlies) |
| Games won | 28 (10 Pernambucano, 0 Copa do Brasil, 17 Série B, 1 Friendlies) |
| Games drawn | 18 (0 Pernambucano, 0 Copa do Brasil, 17 Série B, 1 Friendlies) |
| Games lost | 8 (3 Pernambucano, 1 Copa do Brasil, 4 Série B, 0 Friendlies) |
| Goals scored | 84 |
| Goals conceded | 45 |
| Goal difference | +39 |
| Best results (goal difference) | 4–0 (H) v Salgueiro - Pernambucano - 2019.03.13; 4–0 (H) v Petrolina - Pernambucano - 2019.03.24 |
| Worst result (goal difference) | 0–3 (A) v Tombense - Copa do Brasil - 2019.02.13 |
| Top scorer | Hernane (24) |

Source: Sport Recife official website

=== Goalscorers ===
| Place | Pos. | Nat. | No. | Name | Campeonato Pernambucano | Copa do Brasil | Série B | Other | Total |
|---|---|---|---|---|---|---|---|---|---|
| 1 | FW | (Brazil) | 9 | Hernane | 9 | 0 | 14 | 1 | 24 |
| 2 | FW | (Brazil) | 11 | Guilherme | 4 | 0 | 17 | 0 | 21 |
| 3 | MF | (Brazil) | 17 | Ezequiel | 4 | 0 | 0 | 1 | 5 |
| 4 | FW | (Brazil) | 99 | Élton | 2 | 0 | 2 | 0 | 4 |
| 5 | MF | (Brazil) | 35 | Charles | 1 | 0 | 2 | 0 | 3 |
| = | FW | (Brazil) | 91 | Hyuri | 0 | 0 | 3 | 0 | 3 |
| = | MF | (Brazil) | 29 | Leandrinho | 1 | 0 | 2 | 0 | 3 |
| = | FW | (Brazil) | 7 | Luan | 3 | 0 | 0 | 0 | 3 |
| 6 | DF | (Brazil) | 34 | Adryelson | 2 | 0 | 0 | 0 | 2 |
| = | DF | (Brazil) | 3 | Cleberson | 0 | 0 | 0 | 2 | 2 |
| = | MF | (Brazil) | 19 | Pedro Carmona | 0 | 0 | 2 | 0 | 2 |
| = | DF | (Brazil) | 12 | Sander | 0 | 0 | 2 | 0 | 2 |
| = | MF | (Brazil) | 20 | Yan Matheus | 0 | 0 | 1 | 1 | 2 |
| 7 | MF | (Brazil) | 28 | João Igor | 1 | 0 | 0 | 0 | 1 |
| = | FW | (Brazil) | 37 | Juninho | 1 | 0 | 0 | 0 | 1 |
| = | MF | (Brazil) | 18 | Marquinhos | 0 | 0 | 1 | 0 | 1 |
| = | DF | (Brazil) | 2 | Norberto | 0 | 0 | 1 | 0 | 1 |
| = | DF | (Brazil) | 15 | Rafael Thyere | 1 | 0 | 0 | 0 | 1 |
| = | MF | (Brazil) | 5 | Ronaldo Henrique | 1 | 0 | 0 | 0 | 1 |
| = | MF | (Brazil) | 10 | Sammir | 0 | 0 | 1 | 0 | 1 |
| = | MF | (Brazil) | 8 | Yago | 0 | 0 | 1 | 0 | 1 |
| | | | | Total | 30 | 0 | 49 | 5 | 84 |

=== Managers performance ===
| Name | From | To | P | W | D | L | GF | GA | Avg% | Ref |
|---|---|---|---|---|---|---|---|---|---|---|
| (Brazil) Milton Cruz | 19 January 2019 | 17 February 2019 | 7 | 4 | 0 | 3 | 12 | 8 | 57% | |
| (Brazil) Guto Ferreira | 28 February 2019 | 30 November 2019 | 47 | 24 | 18 | 5 | 72 | 37 | 64% | |

=== Home record ===
| Recife | São Lourenço da Mata |
|---|---|
| Ilha do Retiro | Arena Pernambuco |
| Capacity: 32,983 | Capacity: 44,300 |
| 25 matches (17 wins 5 draws 3 losses) | 3 matches (1 win 2 draws) |

=== Overview ===
| Competition | First match | Last match | Starting round | Final position | Record | | | | | | | |
| Competition | First match | Last match | Starting round | Final position | Pld | W | D | L | GF | GA | GD | Win % |
|---|---|---|---|---|---|---|---|---|---|---|---|---|
| Série B | 26 April | 30 November | Matchday 1 | Runners-up | 38 | 17 | 17 | 4 | 49 | 29 | +20 | 44.74 |
| Pernambucano | 19 January | 21 April | First stage | Winners | 13 | 10 | 0 | 3 | 30 | 10 | +20 | 76.92 |
| Copa do Brasil | 13 February | 13 February | First round | 88th | 1 | 0 | 0 | 1 | 0 | 3 | −3 | 0.00 |
| Friendlies | 30 June | 3 July | None | None | 2 | 1 | 1 | 0 | 5 | 3 | +2 | 50.00 |
| Total | | | | | 54 | 28 | 18 | 8 | 84 | 45 | +39 | 51.85 |

Source: Competitions

== Friendlies ==
=== Taça dos Campeões ===
| 30 June 2019 First leg | Sport | 3–1 | CSA | Recife |
| 15:30 (UTC-3) | Ezequiel 3'; Yan Matheus 55'; Cleberson 71' | Report | Robinho 32' | Stadium: Estádio Adelmar da Costa Carvalho (Ilha do Retiro); Attendance: 4,911; Referee: Rodrigo Pereira |

| 3 July 2019 Second leg | CSA | 2–2 | Sport | Maceió |
| 20:00 (UTC-3) | Gómez 45'; Ricardo Bueno 51' | Report | Hernane 58'; Cleberson 70' | Stadium: Estádio Rei Pelé; Referee: Andrey Matheus Barreto |

== Competitions ==
=== Campeonato Pernambucano ===
==== First stage ====
| 19 January 2019 1 | Sport | 2–3 | Flamengo de Arcoverde | Recife |
| 17:00 (UTC-3) | Adryelson 19'; Guilherme 90+3' | Report | Erikys 58', 80'; Pedro Maycon 63' | Stadium: Estádio Adelmar da Costa Carvalho (Ilha do Retiro); Attendance: 7,287; Referee: Rodrigo Pereira |

| 23 January 2019 2 | Vitória das Tabocas | 0–2 | Sport | São Lourenço da Mata |
| 21:30 (UTC-3) | | Report | Hernane 27'; Charles 41' | Stadium: Estádio Governador Carlos Wilson Campos (Arena Pernambuco); Referee: José Woshington |

| 27 January 2019 3 | Sport | 3–1 | Náutico | Recife |
| 17:00 (UTC-3) | Hernane 6'; Ezequiel 33'; Adryelson 57' | Report | Robinho 90+2' | Stadium: Estádio Adelmar da Costa Carvalho (Ilha do Retiro); Attendance: 8,332; Referee: Débora Cecília |

| 3 February 2019 4 | América | 0–2 | Sport | São Lourenço da Mata |
| 17:00 (UTC-3) | | Report | Hernane 44', 54' | Stadium: Estádio Governador Carlos Wilson Campos (Arena Pernambuco); Referee: Péricles Bassols |

| 10 February 2019 5 | Sport | 3–0 | Petrolina | Recife |
| 17:00 (UTC-3) | Guilherme 9'; Élton 74' (pen.); João Igor 76' | Report | | Stadium: Estádio Adelmar da Costa Carvalho (Ilha do Retiro) |

| 17 February 2019 6 | Santa Cruz | 1–0 | Sport | Recife |
| 17:00 (UTC-3) | Allan Dias 73' | Report | | Stadium: Estádio José do Rego Maciel (Arruda); Attendance: 16,483; Referee: Luiz Sobral |

| 28 February 2019 7 | Sport | 3–1 | Afogados da Ingazeira | Recife |
| 15:30 (UTC-3) | Rafael Thyere 13'; Ezequiel 57'; Élton 90+3' | Report | Rodrigo 7' | Stadium: Estádio Adelmar da Costa Carvalho (Ilha do Retiro) |

| 13 March 2019 8 | Sport | 4–0 | Salgueiro | Recife |
| 19:15 (UTC-3) | Luan 8'; Hernane 34' (pen.); Juninho 70'; Guilherme 80' | Report | | Stadium: Estádio Adelmar da Costa Carvalho (Ilha do Retiro); Attendance: 4,809; Referee: Péricles Bassols |

| 17 March 2019 9 | Central | 1–2 | Sport | Caruaru |
| 16:00 (UTC-3) | Marlon Douglas 90+3' | Report | Luan 55'; Hernane 61' | Stadium: Estádio Luiz José de Lacerda; Attendance: 5,696; Referee: Diego Fernando |

==== Quarter-final ====
| 24 March 2019 | Sport | 4–0 | Petrolina | Recife |
| 16:00 (UTC-3) | Luan 36'; Hernane 43' (pen.); Leandrinho 58'; Ezequiel 82' | Report | | Stadium: Estádio Adelmar da Costa Carvalho (Ilha do Retiro); Referee: Péricles Bassols |

==== Semi-final ====
| 7 April 2019 | Sport | 3–1 | Salgueiro | Recife |
| 16:00 (UTC-3) | Hernane 20', 53'; Ronaldo Henrique 90' | Report | Igor João 72' | Stadium: Estádio Adelmar da Costa Carvalho (Ilha do Retiro); Attendance: 22,117; Referee: Diego Fernando |

==== Finals ====
| 14 April 2019 | Náutico | 0–1 | Sport | Recife |
| 16:00 (UTC-3) | | Report | Ezequiel 81' | Stadium: Estádio Eládio de Barros Carvalho (Aflitos); Attendance: 14,211; Referee: Wilton Pereira Sampaio |

| 21 April 2019 | Sport | 1–2 (4–3 p) | Náutico | Recife |
| 16:00 (UTC-3) | Guilherme 18' (pen.) | Report | Diego Silva 39'; Jiménez 82' | Stadium: Estádio Adelmar da Costa Carvalho (Ilha do Retiro); Attendance: 27,017; Referee: Ricardo Marques Ribeiro |
| | Penalties |
| | Élton (penalty scored); Norberto (penalty scored); Rafael Thyere (penalty scored); Ronaldo Henrique (penalty scored) | | (penalty scored) Wallace Pernambuco; (penalty missed) Rafael Oliveira; (penalty scored) Jiménez; (penalty scored) Hereda; (penalty missed) Diego Silva |

==== Record ====
| Final Position | Points | Matches | Wins | Draws | Losses | Goals For | Goals Away | Win% |
|---|---|---|---|---|---|---|---|---|
| 1st | 30 | 13 | 10 | 0 | 3 | 30 | 10 | 76% |

=== Copa do Brasil ===
==== First round ====
| 13 February 2019 | Tombense | 3–0 | Sport | Tombos |
| 21:30 (UTC-3) | Juan 32'; Denilson 71'; Marquinhos 90+5' | Report | | Stadium: Estádio Antônio Guimarães de Almeida; Attendance: 764; Referee: Jefferson Ferreira de Moraes |

==== Record ====
| Final Position | Points | Matches | Wins | Draws | Losses | Goals For | Goals Away | Win% |
|---|---|---|---|---|---|---|---|---|
| 88th | 0 | 1 | 0 | 0 | 1 | 0 | 3 | 0% |

=== Série B ===
| 26 April 2019 1 | Sport | 1–1 | Oeste | Recife |
| 21:30 (UTC-3) | Hernane 53' | Report | Bruno Lopes 90+3' | Stadium: Estádio Adelmar da Costa Carvalho (Ilha do Retiro); Attendance: 6,492; Referee: Felipe Fernandes de Lima |

| 6 May 2019 2 | Bragantino | 1–1 | Sport | Bragança Paulista |
| 20:00 (UTC-3) | Matheus Peixoto 4' | Report | Hernane 21' | Stadium: Estádio Nabi Abi Chedid; Attendance: 8,200; Referee: Savio Pereira Sampaio |

| 11 May 2019 3 | Sport | 0–0 | Figueirense | Recife |
| 16:30 (UTC-3) | | Report | | Stadium: Estádio Adelmar da Costa Carvalho (Ilha do Retiro); Attendance: 8,166; Referee: Rodrigo Batista Raposo |

| 19 May 2019 4 | América Mineiro | 1–2 | Sport | Belo Horizonte |
| 16:00 (UTC-3) | Ademir 70' | Report | Guilherme 90'; Hyuri 90+3' | Stadium: Estádio Raimundo Sampaio (Independência); Attendance: 2,776; Referee: Edina Alves Batista |

| 24 May 2019 5 | Sport | 3–2 | Londrina | Recife |
| 21:30 (UTC-3) | Hernane 30', 56', 74' | Report | Augusto 59'; Germano 62' | Stadium: Estádio Adelmar da Costa Carvalho (Ilha do Retiro); Attendance: 12,028; Referee: Wagner Reway |

| 28 May 2019 6 | Operário | 2–1 | Sport | Ponta Grossa |
| 19:15 (UTC-3) | Schumacher 60'; Felipe Augusto 67' | Report | Sammir 19' | Stadium: Estádio Germano Krüger; Attendance: 2,964; Referee: Rodrigo Nunes de Sa |

| 8 June 2019 7 | Sport | 3–1 | Vitória | Recife |
| 20:30 (UTC-3) | Guilherme 23', 78'; Charles 40' | Report | Anselmo Ramon 29' | Stadium: Estádio Adelmar da Costa Carvalho (Ilha do Retiro); Attendance: 15,179; Referee: Vinicius Furlan |

| 11 June 2019 8 | Sport | 1–0 | Sport | Recife |
| 21:30 (UTC-3) | Guilherme 40' | Report | | Stadium: Estádio Adelmar da Costa Carvalho (Ilha do Retiro); Attendance: 12,323; Referee: Claudio Francisco Lima e Silva |

| 8 July 2019 9 | São Bento | 2–2 | Sport | Sorocaba |
| 20:00 (UTC-3) | Zé Roberto 26'; Vinícius Kiss 81' | Report | Guilherme 45+1'; Sander 55' | Stadium: Estádio Municipal Walter Ribeiro; Attendance: 1,872; Referee: Antonio Dib Moraes de Sousa |

| 15 July 2019 10 | Cuiabá | 1–1 | Sport | Cuiabá |
| 20:00 (UTC-3) | Anderson Conceição 90+5' | Report | Yago 47' | Stadium: Arena Pantanal; Attendance: 7,802; Referee: Andre Luiz de Freitas Castro |

| 22 July 2019 11 | Sport | 0–0 | Brasil de Pelotas | Recife |
| 20:00 (UTC-3) | | Report | | Stadium: Estádio Adelmar da Costa Carvalho (Ilha do Retiro); Attendance: 9,362; Referee: Douglas Marques das Flores |

| 26 July 2019 12 | Paraná | 0–1 | Sport | Curitiba |
| 21:30 (UTC-3) | | Report | Hernane 13' | Stadium: Estádio Durival Britto e Silva (Vila Capanema); Attendance: 8,160; Referee: Jean Pierre Goncalves Lima |

| 29 July 2019 13 | Sport | 1–1 | Guarani | São Lourenço da Mata |
| 20:00 (UTC-3) | Yan Matheus 18' | Report | Matheus Davó 36' | Stadium: Estádio Governador Carlos Wilson Campos (Arena Pernambuco); Attendance: 18,403; Referee: Grazianni Maciel Rocha |

| 1 August 2019 14 | Sport | 1–1 | Coritiba | São Lourenço da Mata |
| 21:30 (UTC-3) | Hernane 59' | Report | Robson 11' | Stadium: Estádio Governador Carlos Wilson Campos (Arena Pernambuco); Attendance: 14,151; Referee: Vinicius Gomes do Amaral |

| 11 August 2019 15 | Criciúma | 1–0 | Sport | Criciúma |
| 16:00 (UTC-3) | Foguinho 72' | Report | | Stadium: Estádio Heriberto Hülse; Attendance: 3,142; Referee: Thiago Duarte Peixoto |

| 17 August 2019 16 | Sport | 3–0 | Botafogo–SP | São Lourenço da Mata |
| 16:30 (UTC-3) | Hernane 16'; Leandrinho 65'; Guilherme 90+4' | Report | | Stadium: Estádio Governador Carlos Wilson Campos (Arena Pernambuco); Attendance: 15,370; Referee: Alexandre Vargas Tavares de Jesus |

| 20 August 2019 17 | Vila Nova | 0–2 | Sport | Goiânia |
| 21:30 (UTC-3) | | Report | Élton 47'; Hyuri 63' | Stadium: Estádio Olímpico Pedro Ludovico; Attendance: 3,874; Referee: Wanderson Alves de Sousa |

| 24 August 2019 18 | Ponte Preta | 2–2 | Sport | Campinas |
| 19:00 (UTC-3) | Adryelson 50' (o.g.); Roger 86' | Report | Hyuri 54'; Hernane 74' | Stadium: Estádio Moisés Lucarelli; Attendance: 3,639; Referee: Paulo Roberto Alves Junior |

| 27 August 2019 19 | Sport | 1–1 | Atlético Goianiense | Recife |
| 21:30 (UTC-3) | Guilherme 82' | Report | Mike 8' | Stadium: Estádio Adelmar da Costa Carvalho (Ilha do Retiro); Attendance: 13,375; Referee: Leonardo Ferreira Lima |

| 31 August 2019 20 | Oeste | 0–0 | Sport | Barueri |
| 11:00 (UTC-3) | | Report | | Stadium: Arena Barueri; Attendance: 1,516; Referee: Igor Junio Benevenuto de Oliveira |

| 7 September 2019 21 | Sport | 2–1 | Bragantino | Recife |
| 19:00 (UTC-3) | Leandrinho 22'; Guilherme 90+2' | Report | Léo Ortiz 45+2' | Stadium: Estádio Adelmar da Costa Carvalho (Ilha do Retiro); Attendance: 19,058; Referee: Pathrice Wallace Corrêa Maia |

| 15 September 2019 22 | Figueirense | 1–2 | Sport | Florianópolis |
| 16:00 (UTC-3) | Andrigo 89' | Report | Hernane 15'; Norberto 48' | Stadium: Estádio Orlando Scarpelli; Attendance: 3,465; Referee: Andrey da Silva e Silva |

| 20 September 2019 23 | Sport | 0–2 | América Mineiro | Recife |
| 21:30 (UTC-3) | | Report | Pedrão 47'; Leandro Silva 48' | Stadium: Estádio Adelmar da Costa Carvalho (Ilha do Retiro); Attendance: 18,215; Referee: Jonathan Antero Silva |

| 24 September 2019 24 | Londrina | 1–2 | Sport | Londrina |
| 19:15 (UTC-3) | Germano 45+1' | Report | Hernane 11'; Guilherme 82' | Stadium: Estádio Jacy Scaff (do Café); Attendance: 1,706; Referee: Marcelo Aparecido Ribeiro de Souza |

| 28 September 2019 25 | Sport | 3–1 | Operário | Recife |
| 19:00 (UTC-3) | Hernane 44'; Charles 79'; Guilherme 81' | Report | Marcelo Oliveira 70' | Stadium: Estádio Adelmar da Costa Carvalho (Ilha do Retiro); Attendance: 13,124; Referee: Vinicius Gonçalves Dias Araujo |

| 3 October 2019 26 | Vitória | 2–2 | Sport | Salvador |
| 21:30 (UTC-3) | Anselmo Ramon 31'; Wesley 56' | Report | Guilherme 60'; Pedro Carmona 90+3' | Stadium: Itaipava Arena Fonte Nova; Attendance: 7,143; Referee: Felipe Fernandes de Lima |

| 7 October 2019 27 | CRB | 1–1 | Sport | Maceió |
| 20:00 (UTC-3) | Edson Cariús 67' | Report | Guilherme 39' | Stadium: Estádio Rei Pelé; Attendance: 7,003; Referee: Marcelo de Lima Henrique |

| 11 October 2019 28 | Sport | 2–0 | São Bento | Recife |
| 19:15 (UTC-3) | Marquinhos 51'; Hernane 71' | Report | | Stadium: Estádio Adelmar da Costa Carvalho (Ilha do Retiro); Attendance: 13,577; Referee: Roger Goulart |

| 14 October 2019 29 | Sport | 2–0 | Cuiabá | Recife |
| 20:00 (UTC-3) | Sander 12'; Pedro Carmona 55' | Report | | Stadium: Estádio Adelmar da Costa Carvalho (Ilha do Retiro); Attendance: 12,626; Referee: Diego Pombo Lopez |

| 20 October 2019 30 | Brasil de Pelotas | 0–0 | Sport | Pelotas |
| 16:00 (UTC-3) | | Report | | Stadium: Estádio Bento Mendes de Freitas; Attendance: 4,929; Referee: William Machado Steffen |

| 23 October 2019 31 | Sport | 2–1 | Paraná | Recife |
| 19:15 (UTC-3) | Hernane 80'; Guilherme 87' | Report | Fabrício 73' | Stadium: Estádio Adelmar da Costa Carvalho (Ilha do Retiro); Attendance: 14,719; Referee: Dyorgines Jose Padovani de Andrade |

| 31 October 2019 32 | Guarani | 1–0 | Sport | Campinas |
| 19:15 (UTC-3) | Diego Cardoso 90+4' | Report | | Stadium: Estádio Brinco de Ouro da Princesa; Attendance: 3,329; Referee: Andrey da Silva e Silva |

| 4 November 2019 33 | Coritiba | 0–0 | Sport | Curitiba |
| 20:00 (UTC-3) | | Report | | Stadium: Estádio Major Antônio (Couto Pereira); Attendance: 15,039; Referee: Wagner do Nascimento Magalhaes |

| 9 November 2019 34 | Sport | 1–0 | Criciúma | Recife |
| 16:30 (UTC-3) | Guilherme 80' | Report | | Stadium: Estádio Adelmar da Costa Carvalho (Ilha do Retiro); Attendance: 22,158; Referee: Wagner Reway |

| 13 November 2019 35 | Botafogo–SP | 0–2 | Sport | Ribeirão Preto |
| 21:30 (UTC-3) | | Report | Élton 21'; Guilherme 59' | Stadium: Estádio Santa Cruz; Attendance: 1,412; Referee: Rafael Traci |

| 17 November 2019 36 | Sport | 0–0 | Vila Nova | Recife |
| 16:00 (UTC-3) | | Report | | Stadium: Estádio Adelmar da Costa Carvalho (Ilha do Retiro); Attendance: 24,420; Referee: Marielson Alves Silva |

| 20 November 2019 37 | Sport | 2–1 | Ponte Preta | Recife |
| 21:30 (UTC-3) | Guilherme 59', 90+1' | Report | Roger 19' | Stadium: Estádio Adelmar da Costa Carvalho (Ilha do Retiro); Attendance: 22,067; Referee: Joao Batista de Arruda |

| 30 November 2019 38 | Atlético Goianiense | 0–0 | Sport | Goiânia |
| 16:30 (UTC-3) | | Report | | Stadium: Estádio Antônio Accioly; Attendance: 6,695; Referee: Raphael Claus |

==== Record ====
| Final Position | Points | Matches | Wins | Draws | Losses | Goals For | Goals Away | Win% |
|---|---|---|---|---|---|---|---|---|
| 2nd | 68 | 38 | 17 | 17 | 4 | 49 | 29 | 44% |
