= 2017 Primeira Liga =

Tournament details
- Country: Brazil
- Dates: 24 January – 8 October
- Teams: 16

Tournament statistics
- Matches played: 30
- Goals scored: 54 (1.8 per match)
- Top goal scorer(s): (Brazil) Carlos Henrique (Brazil) Clayton (Uruguay) De Arrascaeta (Brazil) Gustavo Papa (Brazil) Paulo Rangel (Argentina) Ramón Ábila (Brazil) Renatinho (Brazil) Safira (2 goals each)

The 2017 Primeira Liga is the second edition of a football competition held in Brazil. Featuring sixteen clubs, the Santa Catarina league provides five entrants, Minas Gerais and Rio Grande do Sul leagues provide three entrants, the Rio de Janeiro and Paraná leagues provide two and the Ceará league provides one.

== Qualified teams ==
Association	Team (Berth)
(Ceará) Ceará; 1 berth	Ceará
(Minas Gerais) Minas Gerais; 3 berths	América
(Minas Gerais) Minas Gerais; 3 berths	Atlético Mineiro
(Minas Gerais) Minas Gerais; 3 berths	Cruzeiro
(Paraná (state)) Paraná; 2 berths	Londrina
(Paraná (state)) Paraná; 2 berths	Paraná
(Rio de Janeiro (state)) Rio de Janeiro; 2 berths	Flamengo
(Rio de Janeiro (state)) Rio de Janeiro; 2 berths	Fluminense
(Rio Grande do Sul) Rio Grande do Sul; 3 berths	Brasil de Pelotas
(Rio Grande do Sul) Rio Grande do Sul; 3 berths	Grêmio
(Rio Grande do Sul) Rio Grande do Sul; 3 berths	Internacional
(Santa Catarina (state)) Santa Catarina; 5 berths	Avaí
(Santa Catarina (state)) Santa Catarina; 5 berths	Chapecoense
(Santa Catarina (state)) Santa Catarina; 5 berths	Criciúma
(Santa Catarina (state)) Santa Catarina; 5 berths	Figueirense
(Santa Catarina (state)) Santa Catarina; 5 berths	Joinville

Globo Esporte
Soccerway

== Format ==
=== Tiebreakers ===
The teams are ranked according to points (3 points for a win, 1 point for a draw, 0 points for a loss). If two or more teams are equal on points on completion of the group matches, the following criteria are applied in the order given to determine the rankings:

1. points won;
2. games won;
3. total goal difference;
4. total goals scored;
5. points in head-to-head matches;
6. lesser number of red cards received;
7. lesser number of yellow cards received;
8. draw.

== Group stage ==
=== Group A ===
Pos	Team	Pld	W	D	L	GF	GA	GD	Pts	Qualification
1	Internacional	3	3	0	0	6	2	+4	9	Qualifies to the Final stage
2	Fluminense	3	1	1	1	4	4	0	4	Qualifies to the Final stage
3	Brasil de Pelotas	3	1	1	1	4	4	0	4	
4	Criciúma	3	0	0	3	4	8	−4	0	

24 January 2017
20:00

Fluminense	3–2	Criciúma
Henrique 37'; Pedro 78'; Marquinho 87'	Report	Raphael Silva 26'; Hélio Paraíba 88'

Estádio Municipal Radialista Mário Helênio, Juiz de Fora
Attendance: 2,650
Referee: Adriano Milczvski
1 February 2017
19:30

Internacional	2–1	Brasil de Pelotas
Nico López 11'; Brenner Marlos 17'	Report	Bruno Lopes 25' (pen.)

Estádio Beira-Rio, Porto Alegre
Attendance: 11,227
Referee: Celio Amorim

8 February 2017
19:15

Internacional	1–0	Fluminense
Charles 25'	Report

Estádio Beira-Rio, Porto Alegre
Attendance: 12,488
Referee: Marco Aurelio Augusto Fazekas Pereira
14 February 2017
21:30

Brasil de Pelotas	2–1	Criciúma
Gustavo Papa 31', 42'	Report	Carlos Eduardo 86'

Estádio Bento Freitas, Pelotas
Attendance: 2,388
Referee: Felipe Fernandes de Lima

23 February 2017
21:30

Criciúma	1–3	Internacional
Flavio Gabriel 43'	Report	Cláudio Winck 72'; Andrigo 75'; Diego Gonçalves 77'

Estádio Heriberto Hülse, Criciúma
Attendance: 1,839
Referee: Felipe Gomes da Silva
26 April 2017
21:30

Fluminense	1–1	Brasil de Pelotas
Danielzinho 50'	Report	Juninho 21'

Estádio de Los Larios, Duque de Caxias
Attendance: 1,177
Referee: Gabriel Maciel

=== Group B ===
Pos	Team	Pld	W	D	L	GF	GA	GD	Pts	Qualification
1	Flamengo	3	2	1	0	3	0	+3	7	Qualifies to the Final stage
2	Grêmio	3	1	1	1	2	3	−1	4	Qualifies to the Final stage
3	Ceará	3	0	3	0	1	1	0	3	
4	América	3	0	1	2	0	2	−2	1	

26 January 2017
19:15

América	0–0	Ceará
	Report

Estádio Independência, Belo Horizonte
Attendance: 1,717
Referee: Héber Lopes
8 February 2017
19:30

Flamengo	2–0	Grêmio
Éverton 43'; Orlando Berrío 78'	Report

Estádio Nacional Mané Garrincha, Brasília
Attendance: 20,224
Referee: Braulio da Silva Machado

16 February 2017
21:30

Flamengo	1–0	América
Gabriel 10'	Report

Bezerrão, Gama
Attendance: 8,147
Referee: Rafael Traci
3 March 2017
22:30

Grêmio	1–1	Ceará
Lucas Rex 54'	Report	Magno Alves 19'

Arena do Grêmio, Porto Alegre
Attendance: 2,944
Referee: Rodrigo D'Alonso Ferreira

22 February 2017
20:30

Ceará	0–0	Flamengo
	Report

Castelão, Fortaleza
Attendance: 17,075
Referee: Anderson Daronco
5 April 2017
21:30

Grêmio	1–0	América
Everton 45+1'	Report

Arena do Grêmio, Porto Alegre
Attendance: 4,829
Referee: Arilson Bispo da Anunciação

=== Group C ===
Pos	Team	Pld	W	D	L	GF	GA	GD	Pts	Qualification
1	Cruzeiro	3	2	1	0	3	0	+3	7	Qualifies to the Final stage
2	Atlético Mineiro	3	1	1	1	4	3	+1	4	Qualifies to the Final stage
3	Chapecoense	3	0	2	1	2	4	−2	2	
4	Joinville	3	0	2	1	0	2	−2	2	

26 January 2017
21:30

Chapecoense	0–0	Joinville
	Report

Arena Condá, Chapecó
Attendance: 7,145
Referee: Willian Machado Steffens
1 February 2017
19:30

Cruzeiro	1–0	Atlético Mineiro
Giorgian De Arrascaeta 28'	Report

Mineirão, Belo Horizonte
Attendance: 41,530
Referee: Wanderson Alves de Souza

9 February 2017
19:15

Atlético Mineiro	2–0	Joinville
Fred 19' (pen.); Rómulo Otero 68'	Report

Estádio Independência, Belo Horizonte
Attendance: 13,248
Referee: Edivaldo Elias da Silva
9 February 2017
21:45

Cruzeiro	2–0	Chapecoense
Ramón Ábila 38' (pen.), 53'	Report

Mineirão, Belo Horizonte
Attendance: 7,057
Referee: Daniel Nobre Bins

1 March 2017
19:30

Chapecoense	2–2	Atlético Mineiro
Wellington Paulista 47'; Jesiel 53' (o.g.)	Report	Carlos César 13'; Clayton 40'

Arena Condá, Chapecó
Attendance: 3,565
Referee: Jean Pierre Goncalves Lima
22 March 2017
19:00

Joinville	0–0	Cruzeiro
	Report

Arena Joinville, Joinville
Attendance: 1,899
Referee: Adriano Milczvski

=== Group D ===
Pos	Team	Pld	W	D	L	GF	GA	GD	Pts	Qualification
1	Londrina	3	3	0	0	4	1	+3	9	Qualifies to the Final stage
2	Paraná	3	1	1	1	3	2	+1	4	Qualifies to the Final stage
3	Figueirense	3	0	2	1	1	2	−1	2	
4	Avaí	3	0	1	2	1	4	−3	1	

25 January 2017
19:00

Figueirense	0–1	Londrina
	Report	Celsinho 82'

Estádio Orlando Scarpelli, Florianópolis
Attendance: 2,189
Referee: Ronei Candido Alves
25 January 2017
19:00

Paraná	2–0	Avaí
Renatinho 22'; Ítalo 45+2'	Report

Estádio Vila Capanema, Curitiba
Attendance: 2,390
Referee: Antonio Marcio Teixeira

31 January 2017
19:00

Avaí	0–1	Londrina
	Report	Safira 90'

Estádio da Ressacada, Florianópolis
Attendance: 1,637
Referee: Leandro Vuaden
2 March 2017
19:15

Paraná	0–0	Figueirense
	Report

Estádio Vila Capanema, Curitiba
Attendance: 2,746
Referee: Renato Cardoso Da Conceição

21 February 2017
21:15

Londrina	2–1	Paraná
Paulo Rangel 32', 45+1'	Report	Pessalli 59' (pen.)

Estádio do Café, Londrina
Attendance: 2,242
Referee: Francisco de Paula Dos Santos Silva Neto
20 April 2017
18:30

Figueirense	1–1	Avaí
Índio 45'	Report	Rômulo 79'

Estádio Orlando Scarpelli, Florianópolis
Attendance: 3,322
Referee: Anderson Daronco

== Knockout stage ==
Quarter-finals
30 August – Estádio do Café
Londrina	2
Fluminense	0
30 August – Mineirão
Cruzeiro	2
Grêmio	0
30 August – Estádio Beira-Rio
Internacional	0
Atlético Mineiro	1
30 August – Estádio Kléber Andrade
Flamengo	1 (4)
Paraná (pen.)	1 (5)

Semi-finals
3 September – Estádio do Café
Londrina (pen.)	2 (3)
Cruzeiro	2 (1)
2 September – Independência
Atlético Mineiro	1
Paraná	0

Final
8 October – Estádio do Café
Londrina	0 (4)
Atlético Mineiro	0 (2)

=== Quarter-finals ===
30 August 2017
19:30

Internacional	0–1	Atlético Mineiro
	Report	Clayton 39'

Estádio Beira-Rio, Porto Alegre
Attendance: 12,184
Referee: Braulio da Silva Machado

30 August 2017
19:30

Londrina	2–0	Fluminense
Carlos Henrique 42', 79'	Report

Estádio do Café, Londrina
Attendance: 2,966
Referee: Jean Pierre Gonçalves Lima

30 August 2017
21:45

Cruzeiro	2–0	Grêmio
Raniel 89'; De Arrascaeta 90+3'	Report

Mineirão, Belo Horizonte
Attendance: 7,545
Referee: Paulo Roberto Alves Júnior

30 August 2017
21:45

Flamengo	1–1	Paraná
Everton Ribeiro 64'	Report	Renatinho 66'
Penalties
Rafael Vaz (penalty scored); Gabriel (penalty scored); Vinícius Júnior (penalty missed); Conca (penalty scored); Everton Ribeiro (penalty scored); Lucas Paquetá (penalty missed)	4–5	(penalty scored) Renatinho; (penalty scored) Leandro Vilela; (penalty missed) Murilo Rangel; (penalty scored) Eduardo Brock; (penalty scored) Alemão; (penalty scored) Vitor Feijão

Estádio Kléber Andrade, Cariacica
Attendance: 9,834
Referee: Renato Cardoso da Conceição

=== Semi-finals ===
2 September 2017
19:00

Atlético Mineiro	1–0	Paraná
Elias 29'	Report

Estádio Independência, Belo Horizonte
Attendance: 12,764
Referee: Luis César de Oliveira Magalhães

3 September 2017
11:00

Londrina	2–2	Cruzeiro
Safira 81'; Germano 90+7'	Report	Lucas Silva 20'; Sassá 54'
Penalties
Germano (penalty scored); Marcinho (penalty missed); Ayrton (penalty scored); Artur (penalty missed); Dirceu (penalty scored)	3–1	(penalty missed) Lucas Silva; (penalty scored) Bryan; (penalty missed) Arthur; (penalty missed) Alex

Estádio do Café, Londrina
Attendance: 15,420
Referee: Leandro Vuaden

=== Final ===
4 October 2017
21:45

Londrina	0 – 0	Atlético Mineiro
	Report
Penalties
Jumar (penalty scored); Edson Silva (penalty scored); Ayrton (penalty scored); Dirceu (penalty scored)	4 – 2	(penalty scored) Fábio Santos; (penalty scored) Robinho; (penalty missed) Clayton; (penalty missed) Rafael Moura

Estádio do Café, Londrina
Attendance: 15,735
Referee: Bráulio da Silva Machado

== Top goalscorers ==
Rank	Name	Team	Goals
1	(Brazil) Carlos Henrique	(Brazil) Londrina	2
1	(Brazil) Clayton	(Brazil) Atlético Mineiro	2
1	(Uruguay) De Arrascaeta	(Brazil) Cruzeiro	2
1	(Brazil) Gustavo Papa	(Brazil) Brasil de Pelotas	2
1	(Brazil) Paulo Rangel	(Brazil) Londrina	2
1	(Argentina) Ramón Ábila	(Brazil) Cruzeiro	2
1	(Brazil) Renatinho	(Brazil) Paraná	2
1	(Brazil) Safira	(Brazil) Londrina	2
2	(Brazil) Andrigo	(Brazil) Internacional	1
2	(Brazil) Brenner Marlos	(Brazil) Internacional	1
2	(Brazil) Bruno Lopes	(Brazil) Brasil de Pelotas	1
2	(Brazil) Carlos César	(Brazil) Atlético Mineiro	1
2	(Brazil) Carlos Eduardo	(Brazil) Criciúma	1
2	(Brazil) Celsinho	(Brazil) Londrina	1
2	(Brazil) Charles	(Brazil) Internacional	1
2	(Brazil) Cláudio Winck	(Brazil) Internacional	1
2	(Brazil) Diego Gonçalves	(Brazil) Internacional	1
2	(Brazil) Elias	(Brazil) Atlético Mineiro	1
2	(Brazil) Éverton	(Brazil) Flamengo	1
2	(Brazil) Everton	(Brazil) Grêmio	1
2	(Brazil) Everton Ribeiro	(Brazil) Flamengo	1
2	(Brazil) Flavio Gabriel	(Brazil) Criciúma	1
2	(Brazil) Fred	(Brazil) Atlético Mineiro	1
2	(Brazil) Gabriel	(Brazil) Flamengo	1
2	(Brazil) Germano	(Brazil) Londrina	1
2	(Brazil) Hélio Paraíba	(Brazil) Criciúma	1
2	(Brazil) Henrique	(Brazil) Fluminense	1
2	(Brazil) Índio	(Brazil) Figueirense	1
2	(Brazil) Ítalo	(Brazil) Paraná	1
2	(Brazil) Jesiel	(Brazil) Chapecoense	1
2	(Brazil) Lucas Rex	(Brazil) Grêmio	1
2	(Brazil) Lucas Silva	(Brazil) Cruzeiro	1
2	(Brazil) Magno Alves	(Brazil) Ceará	1
2	(Brazil) Marquinho	(Brazil) Fluminense	1
2	(Uruguay) Nicolás López	(Brazil) Internacional	1
2	(Colombia) Orlando Berrío	(Brazil) Flamengo	1
2	(Brazil) Pessalli	(Brazil) Paraná	1
2	(Brazil) Pedro	(Brazil) Fluminense	1
2	(Brazil) Raniel	(Brazil) Cruzeiro	1
2	(Brazil) Raphael Silva	(Brazil) Criciúma	1
2	(Brazil) Rômulo	(Brazil) Avaí	1
2	(Venezuela) Rómulo Otero	(Brazil) Atlético Mineiro	1
2	(Brazil) Sassá	(Brazil) Cruzeiro	1
2	(Brazil) Wellington Paulista	(Brazil) Chapecoense	1

Globo Esporte
Soccerway

== Media coverage ==
Market	Countries	Broadcast partner	Ref
Brazil	1	SporTV (Portuguese); Premiere (Portuguese)	
Total countries	1		
