= 2016 Botafogo FR season =

Botafogo de Futebol e Regatas
2016 season
- Head coach: Ricardo Gomes
- Stadiums: various
- Campeonato Brasileiro: 5th
- Campeonato Carioca: 2nd
- Copa do Brasil: Round of 16
- Top goalscorer: League: Sassá (12); All: Sassá (14)
- Highest home attendance: 53,634 (vs Vasco da Gama, 8 May 2016)
- Lowest home attendance: 211 (vs Coruripe, 28 April 2016)
- All statistics correct as of 21 October 2016.

The 2016 season saw the return of Botafogo de Futebol e Regatas to the Campeonato Brasileiro Série A, after spending 2015 in Série B.

== Background ==
After a poor 2014 season saw Botafogo relegated for only the second time in their history, Botafogo comfortably won the 2015 Série B.

== Match results ==
=== Legend ===
Win	Draw	Loss

=== Preseason ===
Date	Opponents	H/A	Result	Scorers	Attendance
23 January 2016	Desportiva Ferroviária	A	1–2	Gegê	2,479

=== Campeonato Carioca ===
==== Group stage ====
Date	Opponents	H/A	Result	Scorers	Attendance
30 January 2016	Bangu	A	2–0	Gervasio Núñez, Renan Fonseca	1,647
2 February 2016	Portuguesa	H	2–1	Damián Lizio	1,273
10 February 2016	Macaé	H	1–0	Gervasio Núñez	1,112
13 February 2016	Resende	A	1–0	Luís Henrique	2,507
21 February 2016	Cabofriense	H	2–1	Luís Henrique, Neílton	2,398
24 February 2016	Fluminense	H	2–0	Gegê, Ribamar	9,838
28 February 2016	Vasco da Gama	A	1–1	Emerson	7,921
6 March 2016	Boavista	A	1–0	Fernandes	1,128

Pos	Team	Pld	W	D	L	GF	GA	GD	Pts	Qualification
1	Botafogo	8	7	1	0	12	3	+9	22	Taça Guanabara
2	Flamengo	8	6	1	1	19	4	+15	19	Taça Guanabara
3	Volta Redonda	8	3	4	1	13	10	+3	13	Taça Guanabara
4	Madureira	8	3	3	2	12	12	0	12	Taça Guanabara
5	America	8	3	2	3	9	9	0	11	Taça Rio

Updated to match(es) played on 3 March 2016. Source:
Rules for classification: 1) points; 2) goal difference; 3) number of goals scored.

==== Taça Guanabara ====
Date	Opponents	H/A	Result	Scorers	Attendance
13 March 2016	Fluminense	A	1–1	Ribamar	4,378
20 March 2016	Madureira	H	1–0	Bruno Silva	996
27 March 2016	Vasco da Gama	A	0–1		6,483
30 March 2016	Volta Redonda	H	2–0	Rodrigo Lindoso, Joel Carli	905
2 April 2016	Flamengo	H	2–2	Joel Carli, Rodrigo Lindoso	16,150
10 April 2016	Bangu	H	1–0	Rodrigo Lindoso	1,509
17 April 2016	Boavista	A	1–0	Leandro	2,700

Pos	Team	Pld	W	D	L	GF	GA	GD	Pts	Qualification
1	Vasco da Gama	7	5	2	0	8	2	+6	17	Taça GB champions and Semifinals
2	Fluminense	7	4	2	1	10	3	+7	14	Advanced in Semifinals
3	Botafogo	7	4	2	1	8	4	+4	14	Advanced in Semifinals
4	Flamengo	7	3	3	1	10	4	+6	12	Advanced in Semifinals
5	Volta Redonda	7	2	2	3	6	8	−2	8	Taça Rio

Rules for classification: 1) points; 2) goal difference; 3) number of goals scored.

==== Final stage ====
Match	Date	Opponents	H/A	Result	Scorers	Attendance
Semifinal	24 April 2016	Fluminense	A	1–0	Ribamar	3,562
Final - first leg	1 May 2016	Vasco da Gama	H	0–1		37,207
Final - second leg	8 May 2016	Vasco da Gama	H	1–1^{[a]}	Leandro	53,634

^{a - Vasco da Gama won the final 2–1 on aggregate}

=== Copa do Brasil ===
Round	Date	Opponents	H/A	Result	Scorers	Attendance
First round	5 April 2016	Coruripe	A	1–0	Luís Henrique	1,077
First round	28 April 2016	Coruripe	H	1–1	Sassá	211
Second round	12 May 2016	Juazeirense	A	2–1	Neílton, Emerson Silva	2,763
Second round	19 May 2016	Juazeirense	H	1–0	Neílton	377
Third round	13 July 2016	Bragantino	A	2–2	Dierson, Gervasio Núñez	1,434
Third round	27 July 2016	Bragantino	H	1–0	Vinícius Tanquinho	4,314
Round of 16	1 September 2016	Cruzeiro	H	2–5	Sassá, Neílton	4,491
Round of 16	21 September 2016	Cruzeiro	A	0–1		10,604

=== Campeonato Brasileiro Série A ===
Week	Date	Opponents	H/A	Result	Scorers	Attendance
1	15 May 2016	São Paulo	H	0–1		5,465
2	22 May 2016	Sport	A	1–1	Fernandes	6,117
3	25 May 2016	Atlético Paranaense	H	2–1	Ribamar, Neílton	4,445
4	29 May 2016	Fluminense	A	0–1		4,550
5	1 June 2016	Cruzeiro	H	0–1		7,057
6	5 June 2016	Santos	A	0–3		16,530
7	12 June 2016	Vitória	H	1–1	Sassá	2,208
8	15 June 2016	América	H	3–1	Sassá (3)	1,255
9	19 June 2016	Corinthians	A	1–3	Leandro	34,747
10	22 June 2016	Figueirense	H	0–0		3,012
11	26 June 2016	Internacional	A	3–2	Fernandes, Neilton, Camilo	21,562
12	30 June 2016	Atlético Mineiro	A	3–5	Sassá, Gervasio Núñez, Bruno Silva	36,129
13	3 July 2016	Santa Cruz	H	2–1	Sassá, Neilton	5,423
14	9 July 2016	Coritiba	A	0–0		10,922
15	16 July 2016	Flamengo	H	3–3	Diogo Goiano, Neilton, Juan Manuel Salgueiro	11,692
16	24 July 2016	Chapecoense	A	1–2	Camilo	7,013
17	31 July 2016	Palmeiras	H	3–1	Neilton (2), Camilo	8,477
18	4 August 2016	Ponte Preta	A	0–2		5,050
20	14 August 2016	São Paulo	A	1–0	Sassá	14,399
21	20 August 2016	Sport	H	3–0	Sassá (2), Camilo	4,771
22	29 August 2016	Atlético Paranaense	A	0–1		11,453
19	4 September 2016	Grêmio	H	2–1	Camilo, Sassá	5,199
23	7 September 2016	Fluminense	H	1–0	Neílton	10,156
24	11 September 2016	Cruzeiro	A	2–0	Canales, Camilo	26,611
25	14 September 2016	Santos	H	0–1		11,883
26	18 September 2016	Vitória	A	1–0	Rodrigo Pimpão	9,900
27	24 September 2016	América	A	0–1		1,789
28	1 October 2016	Corinthians	H	2–0	Neílton, Diogo Goiano	9,123
29	9 October 2016	Figueirense	A	1–0	Bruno Silva	12,325
30	12 October 2016	Internacional	H	1–0	Sassá	10,176
31	16 October 2016	Atlético Mineiro	H	3–2	Bruno Silva, Rodrigo Pimpão, Dudu Cearense	14,595
32	19 October 2016	Santa Cruz	A	1–0	Rodrigo Pimpão	3,480
33	29 October 2016	Coritiba	H	0–0		15,170
34	5 November 2016	Flamengo	A	0–0		49,382
35	16 November 2016	Chapecoense	H	0–2		10,170
36	20 November 2016	Palmeiras	A	0–1		39,690
37	26 November 2016	Ponte Preta	H	1–1	Sassá	12,069
38	11 December 2016	Grêmio	A	1–0	Bruno Silva	14,101

== Squad statistics ==
Statistics accurate as at the end of the 2016 season

Pos.	Nat.	Name	Total		Série A		Campeonato Carioca		Copa do Brasil	
Pos.	Nat.	Name	Apps	Goals	Apps	Goals	Apps	Goals	Apps	Goals
GK	(Brazil)	Helton Leite	11	0	6	0	0	0	5	0
GK	(Brazil)	Sidão	35	0	32	0	0	0	3	0
GK	(Brazil)	Jefferson	19	0	0	0	18	0	1	0
DF	(Brazil)	Diego	16	0	3	0	7	0	6	0
DF	(Brazil)	Diogo Goiano	45	2	26	2	17	0	2	0
DF	(Brazil)	Emerson Santos	43	1	30	0	10	1	3	0
DF	(Brazil)	Emerson	31	1	21	0	6	0	4	1
DF	(Argentina)	Joel Carli	30	2	16	0	12	2	2	0
DF	(Brazil)	Luis Ricardo	38	0	20	0	15	0	3	0
DF	(Brazil)	Marcelo Conceição	1	0	1	0	0	0	0	0
DF	(Brazil)	Marcinho	2	0	0	0	1	0	1	0
DF	(Brazil)	Renan Fonseca	34	1	17	0	11	1	6	0
DF	(Brazil)	Victor Luis	26	0	22	0	0	0	4	0
DF	(Brazil)	Igor Rabello	1	0	0	0	0	0	1	0
DF	(Brazil)	Jean	3	0	0	0	1	0	2	0
MF	(Brazil)	Airton	33	0	21	0	10	0	2	0
MF	(Brazil)	Alemão	10	0	10	0	0	0	0	0
MF	(Brazil)	Bruno Silva	51	5	31	4	13	1	7	0
MF	(Brazil)	Camilo	30	6	28	6	0	0	2	0
MF	(Bolivia)	Damián Lizio	7	1	0	0	5	1	2	0
MF	(Brazil)	Dierson	10	1	3	0	3	0	4	1
MF	(Brazil)	Dudu Cearense	16	1	16	1	0	0	0	0
MF	(Brazil)	Fernandes	32	3	19	2	9	1	4	0
MF	(Argentina)	G. Núñez	33	4	20	1	9	2	4	1
MF	(Brazil)	Gegê	22	2	4	0	17	2	1	0
MF	(Brazil)	Leandro	30	3	18	1	8	2	4	0
MF	(Brazil)	Marquinho	4	0	2	0	0	0	2	0
MF	(Brazil)	Octávio	4	0	1	0	2	0	1	0
MF	(Brazil)	Rodrigo Lindoso	47	3	25	0	17	3	5	0
MF	(Brazil)	Lucas Zen	2	0	0	0	2	0	0	0
FW	(Brazil)	Anderson Aquino	6	0	6	0	0	0	0	0
FW	(Chile)	Gustavo Canales	11	1	9	1	0	0	2	0
FW	(Brazil)	Geovane Maranhão	1	0	0	0	0	0	1	0
FW	(Uruguay)	J. Salgueiro	29	1	11	1	13	0	5	0
FW	(Brazil)	Luís Henrique	23	3	5	0	12	2	6	1
FW	(Brazil)	Neilton	54	12	35	8	13	1	6	3
FW	(Brazil)	Pachu	1	0	1	0	0	0	0	0
FW	(Brazil)	Ribamar	32	4	12	1	18	3	2	0
FW	(Brazil)	Rodrigo Pimpão	25	3	23	3	0	0	2	0
FW	(Brazil)	Sassá	31	14	26	12	1	0	4	2
FW	(Brazil)	Vinícius Tanque	15	1	12	0	0	0	3	1

== Kits ==
Home kit for Campeonato Carioca season	Away kit for Campeonato Carioca season	Third kit for Campeonato Carioca season	Home kit for Campeonato Brasileiro season	Away kit for Campeonato Brasileiro season	Third kit for Campeonato Brasileiro season

Botafogo began the year wearing uniforms manufactured by Puma. With the Puma deal expiring in April, the club announced in February that a three-year deal had been agreed with Topper with a value believed to be worth over R$40m.

== Awards ==
- Campeonato Carioca Revelação [Young Player of the Year]: Ribamar

== Venues ==
As a result of the 2016 Summer Olympics being held in Rio de Janeiro, Botafogo was not able to access their regular home of Estádio Olímpico João Havelange (known as the Estádio Nilton Santos for Botafogo games) during 2016. During the Rio State Championship, Botafogo hosted games at the Estádio São Januário in Rio de Janeiro city; the Estádio de Los Larios in Duque de Caxias, Rio de Janeiro; the Estádio Kléber Andrade in Cariacica, Espírito Santo; the Estádio Mário Helênio in Juiz de Fora, Minas Gerais; and the Maracanã Stadium in Rio de Janeiro city. Botafogo's home matches in the first two rounds of the Copa do Brasil were hosted at the Estádio de Los Larios.

Prior to the commencement of the Campeonato Brasileiro, Botafogo and Associação Atlética Portuguesa agreed a deal to play at the Estádio Luso Brasileiro in Ilha do Governador in Rio de Janeiro city with the stadium being known as "Arena Botafogo". Prior to matches being played at the stadium, temporary seating and improvements to the pitch were required. While these renovations took place, matches were played at the Estádio Raulino de Oliveira in Volta Redonda, Rio de Janeiro; the Estádio Nacional Mané Garrincha in Brasília; and the Estádio Mário Helênio in Juiz de Fora, Minas Gerais.

== Sources ==
- "Brazil - Botafogo FR". Soccerway.
