= Dirceu (footballer, born 1988) =

Brazilian footballer

Personal information
- Full name: Dirceu Wiggers de Oliveira Filho
- Date of birth: 5 January 1988 (age 38)
- Place of birth: Ibaiti, Brazil
- Height: 1.91 m (6 ft 3 in)
- Position: Centre back

Team information
- Current team: Vilafranquense
- Number: 2

Youth career
- Coritiba

Senior career*
Years	Team	Apps	(Gls)
2008–2012	Coritiba	18	(0)
2011	→ Botafogo-SP (loan)	5	(0)
2011	→ Avaí (loan)	17	(1)
2012	→ Nova Iguaçu (loan)	8	(1)
2012	→ América Mineiro (loan)	8	(0)
2013	→ Londrina (loan)	29	(0)
2013	→ Paysandu (loan)	6	(0)
2014	Hoverla Uzhhorod	0	(0)
2014–2015	Londrina	46	(3)
2015–2016	Marítimo	28	(2)
2017	Figueirense	13	(1)
2017–2018	Londrina	55	(0)
2019	Ratchaburi Mitr Phol	9	(0)
2019	Londrina	10	(0)
2020–	Vilafranquense	5	(0)
- * Club domestic league appearances and goals as of 23:23, 4 March 2020 (UTC)

Dirceu Wiggers de Oliveira Filho (born 5 January 1988), simply known as Dirceu, is a Brazilian professional footballer who plays as a centre back for Portuguese club U.D. Vilafranquense.

== Club career ==
Dirceu was born in Ibaiti, Paraná. A Coritiba youth graduate, he made his debut as a senior in a derby against Atlético Paranaense in 2008 Campeonato Paranaense.

On 30 December 2008 Dirceu renewed his contract with Coxa, being definitely promoted to the main squad. A defensive midfielder, he was converted into a central defender during the 2009 campaign.

After being rarely used, Dirceu was subsequently loaned to Botafogo-SP and Avaí in 2011, suffering relegation with the latter. In 2012, he represented Nova Iguaçu and América Mineiro, also in temporary deals.

On 7 January 2013 Dirceu was loaned to Londrina, with Arthur moving in the opposite direction. He subsequently had another loan spell at Paysandu, and moved abroad to FC Hoverla Uzhhorod on 25 January 2014.

Nearly a month later Dirceu rescinded with Hoverla and returned to his previous club Londrina, now in a permanent deal. He was a first-choice during his second spell at Tubarão, being also a part of the squad during the club's Campeonato Paranaense winning campaign.

On 27 July 2015, Dirceu signed with C.S. Marítimo. He made his Primeira Liga debut on 13 September, starting in a 5–2 home routing of Vitória de Setúbal.

Dirceu scored his first goal abroad on 15 November 2015, in a 4–2 Taça da Liga away win against C.D. Feirense. Twelve days later he added another, but in a 1–3 loss at C.D. Nacional.

== Career statistics ==
As of 16 January 2016

Club	Season	League			State League		Cup		Continental		Other		Total	
Club	Season	Division	Apps	Goals	Apps	Goals	Apps	Goals	Apps	Goals	Apps	Goals	Apps	Goals
Coritiba	2008	Série A	2	0	0	0	0	0	—		—		2	0
Coritiba	2009	Série A	14	0	0	0	1	0	—		—		15	0
Coritiba	2010	Série B	1	0	0	0	0	0	—		—		1	0
Coritiba	2012	Série A	1	0	0	0	0	0	—		—		1	0
Coritiba	Subtotal		18	0	0	0	1	0	0	0	0	0	19	0
Botafogo-SP	2011	Paulista	—		5	0	—		—		—		5	0
Avaí	2011	Série A	17	1	—		—		—		—		17	1
Nova Iguaçu	2012	Carioca	—		8	1	—		—		—		8	1
América Mineiro	2012	Série B	8	0	—		—		—		—		8	0
Londrina	2013	Série D	9	0	20	4	—		—		—		29	4
Paysandu	2013	Série B	6	0	—		—		—		—		6	0
Londrina	2014	Série D	14	2	8	0	6	0	—		—		28	2
Londrina	2015	Série C	8	1	16	2	2	0	—		—		26	3
Londrina	Subtotal		22	3	24	2	8	0	0	0	0	0	54	5
Marítimo	2015–16	Primeira Liga	13	1	—		2	1	—		1 (Note: Appearance(s) in Taça da Liga)	0	16	2
Career total			93	5	57	7	12	1	0	0	1	0	163	13

== Honours ==
=== Club ===
Coritiba

- Campeonato Paranaense: 2008, 2010
- Campeonato Brasileiro Série B: 2010

Londrina

- Campeonato Paranaense: 2014
- Primeira Liga: 2017

=== Individual ===
- Campeonato Paranaense Best defender: 2013, 2014, 2015
