= João Igor =

Brazilian footballer (born 1996)

Personal information
- Full name: João Igor Oliveira de Santana
- Date of birth: 14 March 1996 (age 30)
- Place of birth: Jardinópolis, Brazil
- Height: 1.77 m (5 ft 10 in)
- Position: Midfielder

Team information
- Current team: Chapecoense
- Number: 28

Youth career
- 2008: Olympiacos
- 2008: Botafogo-SP
- 2008–2011: Olé Brasil
- 2011–2016: Santos

Senior career*
Years	Team	Apps	(Gls)
2016–2019	Santos	0	(0)
2019	→ Sport Recife (loan)	17	(1)
2020–	Sport Recife	14	(0)
2023–	→ Chapecoense (loan)	2	(0)
- * Club domestic league appearances and goals as of 5 September 2023

João Igor Oliveira de Santana (born 14 March 1996), known as João Igor, is a Brazilian footballer who plays as a midfielder for Chapecoense on loan from Sport Recife.

== Club career ==
=== Santos ===
João Igor was born in Jardinópolis, São Paulo, and joined Santos' youth setup in 2011, from Olé Brasil. In 2016 he was promoted to the B-team, and made his senior debut on 28 September by starting in a 2–0 home win against Catanduvense, for the year's Copa Paulista.

On 29 September 2017, João Igor signed a new five-year deal with the club.

=== Sport Recife ===
On 8 January 2019, João Igor agreed to a short-term loan deal with Série B side Sport Recife. He made his professional debut on 27 January, coming on as a second-half substitute for goalscorer Ezequiel in a 3–1 home win against Náutico for the Campeonato Pernambucano championship. Fourteen days later he scored his first goal, netting the third in a 3–0 home defeat of Petrolina.

João Igor made his Série B debut on 26 April 2019, replacing Ronaldo late into a 1–1 home draw against Oeste. On 30 December, after helping with 15 league matches as Sport achieved promotion to the top tier, he agreed to a permanent two-year deal after the club bought 50% of his economic rights.

== Career statistics ==
As of 2 November 2020

Club	Season	League			State League		Cup		Continental		Other		Total	
Club	Season	Division	Apps	Goals	Apps	Goals	Apps	Goals	Apps	Goals	Apps	Goals	Apps	Goals
Santos	2016	Série A	0	0	—		0	0	—		5 (Note: Appearance(s) in Copa Paulista)	0	5	0
Santos	2017	Série A	0	0	—		0	0	—		15	0	15	0
Santos	2018	Série A	0	0	—		0	0	—		0	0	0	0
Santos	Total		0	0	—		0	0	—		20	0	20	0
Sport Recife	2019	Série B	15	0	2	1	0	0	—		—		17	1
Sport Recife	2020	Série A	3	0	6	0	1	0	—		2 (Note: Appearance(s) in Copa do Nordeste)	0	12	0
Sport Recife	Total		18	0	8	1	1	0	—		2	0	29	1
Career total			18	0	8	1	1	0	0	0	22	0	49	1

== Honours ==
Sport

- Campeonato Pernambucano: 2019
