= Germano (footballer, born 1981) =

Brazilian footballer

Personal information
- Full name: Germano Borovicz Cardozo Schweger
- Date of birth: 21 March 1981 (age 45)
- Place of birth: Toledo, Brazil
- Height: 1.77 m (5 ft 10 in)
- Position: Defensive midfielder

Team information
- Current team: Londrina (director)

Youth career
- 1996: Grêmio Maringá

Senior career*
Years	Team	Apps	(Gls)
1996–2000	Toledo	109	(34)
2001–2004	Londrina	?	(?)
2002	→ Cascavel (loan)		
2004	→ Gama (loan)	6	(0)
2005–2007	Junior Team Futebol	0	(0)
2005	→ Ceará (loan)	16	(0)
2005–2006	→ São Caetano (loan)	3	(0)
2006	→ Vila Nova (loan)	16	(2)
2007	→ Atlético Mineiro (loan)	4	(1)
2007	→ Cerezo Osaka (loan)	14	(4)
2008	Cerezo Osaka	35	(13)
2009–2010	Santos	32	(2)
2010–2012	Sport Recife	48	(5)
2013–2019	Londrina	136	(25)
2013–2014	→ Coritiba (loan)	19	(2)
- * Club domestic league appearances and goals

Germano Borovicz Cardozo Schweger or simply Germano (born 21 March 1981), is a retired Brazilian footballer who played as a defensive midfielder.

== Biography ==
=== Londrina and loans ===
Born in Toledo, Paraná, Germano had played for Grêmio Maringá and Toledo Esporte Clube before joined Londrina. he played for Cascavel in 2002 season and won promotion to Campeonato Paranaense as Campeonato Paranaense 2ª Divisão third place. After Londrina failed to qualify to the final round of 2004 Campeonato Brasileiro Série B, he was loaned to Gama and made his debut on 2 October 2004 as substitute. The team finished as the runner-up of 2004 Campeonato Brasileiro Série C and promoted.

He then signed a contract with Londrina's affiliated club Londrina Junior Team (later became an independent team) and loaned to Ceará. The loan was extended in April. He played 16 games in 2005 Campeonato Brasileiro Série B; the team finished as the 11th, failed to qualify for the final stage. In September, he was loaned to São Caetano of Campeonato Brasileiro Série A. His contract with São Caetano was renewed in January 2006. He extended his contract with Londrina Junior in May 2006. and he was loaned to Vila Nova in September. He scored a debut goal on 9 September (round 22), an equalizing goal against Ituano; eventually the match end in 1–1 draw. The team as the bottom of 2006 Campeonato Brasileiro Série B and relegated.

In January 2007 he extended his contract with Londrina Junior again and loaned to Atlético Mineiro.

=== Oerezo Osaka ===
In August, he was loaned to J2 League club Cerezo Osaka. In January 2008 he was signed in permanent deal.

=== Santos ===
In January 2009 he returned to Brazil and signed a 1-year deal with Santos FC. In January 2010 he extended his contract until 30 May 2011.

=== Sport Recife ===
On 19 May 2010 he was signed by Sport Recife on a 2 1/2-year contract.

=== Retirement ===
At the end of November 2019, 38-year-old Germano announced his retirement. Shortly after, he was hired as a director for Londrina, where he was going to be the link between the football department and the management, and also be involved in player sales as well as purchases.

== Club statistics ==
Club performance			League		Cup		Total	
Season	Club	League	Apps	Goals	Apps	Goals	Apps	Goals
Japan			League		Emperor's Cup		Total	
2007	Cerezo Osaka	J2 League	14	4	2	0	16	4
2008	Cerezo Osaka	J2 League	35	13	2	0	37	13
Country	Japan		49	17	4	0	53	17
Total			49	17	4	0	53	17

== Honours ==
Atlético Mineiro

- Minas Gerais State League: 2007

Santos

- São Paulo State League: 2010

Londrina

- Primeira Liga: 2017
