= Carlos Henrique (footballer, born 1995) =

Brazilian footballer (born 1995)

Personal information
- Full name: Carlos Henrique Alves Pereira
- Date of birth: 27 February 1995 (age 31)
- Place of birth: Sorriso, Brazil
- Height: 1.82 m (6 ft 0 in)
- Position: Forward

Youth career
- Grêmio
- Internacional
- 2013: Coritiba
- 2013: Juventude
- 2014: Figueirense

Senior career*
Years	Team	Apps	(Gls)
2014	Veranópolis	3	(0)
2015	Figueirense	1	(0)
2015–2016	Luverdense	3	(0)
2016–2017	Sinop	2	(1)
2017	PSTC	11	(3)
2017–2021	Londrina	47	(12)
2018	→ Sport Recife (loan)	15	(2)
2019	→ Grêmio Novorizontino (loan)	0	(0)
2019	→ Juventude (loan)	7	(3)
2021–2022	FC Cascavel	0	(0)
2022	→ Paraná Clube	13	(3)
2022	→ Avenida	10	(5)
2023	→ Limera	6	(0)
- * Club domestic league appearances and goals as of 20:51, 7 December 2019 (UTC)

Carlos Henrique Alves Pereira (born 27 February 1995), known as Carlos Henrique, is a Brazilian footballer who plays as a forward.

== Career ==
Born in Sorriso, Mato Grosso, Carlos was released from Internacional in 2012, after leaving the club's training camp to go to a party. After eight months out of the fields he moved to Coritiba, but after failing to adapt with the city, joined Juventude.

In 2014 Carlos signed for Veranópolis, making his senior debuts in that year's Campeonato Gaúcho. After the end of the tournament he joined Figueirense, returning to youth setup.

Carlos was promoted to the main squad of Figueira in 2015 by manager Argel Fucks, and made his Série A debut on 10 May, coming on as a second-half substitute for Nirley in a 4–1 away loss against Sport.
