= Leandrinho (footballer, born 1996) =

Brazilian footballer

Personal information
- Full name: Leandro Alves de Carvalho
- Date of birth: 21 September 1996 (age 30)
- Place of birth: Rio de Janeiro, Brazil
- Height: 1.75 m (5 ft 9 in)
- Position: Midfielder

Team information
- Current team: Associação Atlética Portuguesa (RJ)

Youth career
- 2010–2013: Flamengo
- 2014–2015: Botafogo

Senior career*
Years	Team	Apps	(Gls)
2016–2020	Botafogo	47	(5)
2019	→ Sport Recife (loan)	38	(3)
2020–2021	Gil Vicente	7	(0)
2021–2022	Operário Ferroviário	6	(0)
2023	Paysandu	7	(0)
- * Club domestic league appearances and goals as of 9 September 2023

Leandro Alves de Carvalho (born 21 September 1996), known as Leandrinho, is a Brazilian footballer who plays as a midfielder.

== Club career ==
Leandrinho was born in Rio de Janeiro, Rio de Janeiro and started his career at Botafogo. He made his first team debut on 30 January 2016, against Bangu, for the Campeonato Carioca and scored his first goal in a 1–0 away win against Boavista on 17 April 2016. He made his Série A debut on 15 May 2016, from starting in a 0–1 home loss against São Paulo.

On 14 January 2019, Sport Recife announced that they had loaned Leandrinho and his teammate Ezequiel from Botafogo for the 2019 season.

== Career statistics ==
As of 9 May 2019

Club	Season	League			State League		Cup		Continental		Other		Total	
Club	Season	Division	Apps	Goals	Apps	Goals	Apps	Goals	Apps	Goals	Apps	Goals	Apps	Goals
Botafogo	2016	Série A	18	1	8	2	4	0	—		—		30	3
Botafogo	2017	Série A	6	1	7	1	2	0	0	0	—		15	2
Botafogo	2018	Série A	1	0	0	0	0	0	—		—		1	0
Botafogo	Total		25	2	15	3	6	0	0	0	—		46	5
Sport Recife (loan)	2019	Série B	28	2	10	1	0	0	—		—		38	3
Career total			53	4	25	4	6	0	0	0	0	0	84	8

== Honours ==
=== Club ===
Botafogo

- Campeonato Carioca: 2018

Sport Recife

- Campeonato Pernambucano: 2019
