= Murilo Rangel =

Brazilian footballer

Personal information
- Full name: Murilo Rangel Barbosa
- Date of birth: 1 August 1991 (age 35)
- Place of birth: Limeira, Brazil
- Height: 1.79 m (5 ft 10 1/2 in)
- Position: Attacking midfielder

Youth career
- 2009–2010: Iraty

Senior career*
Years	Team	Apps	(Gls)
2011	Liverpool Montevideo	1	(0)
2012–2014	Londrina	4	(0)
2014	→ São Paulo-RS (loan)	12	(2)
2015	Resende	5	(0)
2016	Toledo	13	(3)
2016–2017	Paraná	28	(2)
2017	→ Linense (loan)	3	(0)
2018	Joinville	17	(3)
2019	Central	9	(2)
2019	Brasil de Pelotas	34	(3)
2020	Inter de Limeira	11	(6)
2020	Guarani	27	(3)
2021	Novorizontino	14	(1)
2021	Cuiabá	1	(0)
2022	Ferroviária		
2022	Água Santa		
2023	São Bento	0	(0)
2023	Caldense	3	(0)
- * Club domestic league appearances and goals as of 26 March 2023

Murilo Rangel Barbosa (born 1 August 1991), known as Murilo Rangel, is a Brazilian footballer who plays as an attacking midfielder.

Previously he has represented Paraná and Londrina in Campeonato Brasileiro Série B.

Although born in Brazil, Murilo Rangel made his professional debut in Uruguay, for Liverpool Fútbol Club, coming on as a substitute in a 2011 Primera División Clausura game against Racing Club de Montevideo on 20 February 2011.
