= Sassá (footballer, born 1994) =

Brazilian footballer

Personal information
- Full name: Luiz Ricardo Alves
- Date of birth: 11 January 1994 (age 32)
- Place of birth: Rio de Janeiro, Brazil
- Height: 1.74 m (5 ft 8 1/2 in)
- Position: Forward

Team information
- Current team: Nacional-AM (on loan from Confiança)
- Number: 99

Youth career
- 2009–2011: Botafogo

Senior career*
Years	Team	Apps	(Gls)
2012–2017	Botafogo	109	(33)
2014	→ Oeste (loan)	3	(0)
2014	→ Náutico (loan)	22	(9)
2017–2022	Cruzeiro	92	(20)
2020	→ Coritiba (loan)	18	(4)
2021	→ Marítimo (loan)	7	(0)
2022	CSA	6	(0)
2023	Athletic Club	11	(1)
2023–2025	Amazonas	75	(29)
2025	Criciúma	11	(0)
2026–	Confiança	20	(1)
2026–	→ Nacional-AM (loan)	6	(1)
- * Club domestic league appearances and goals as of 1 November 2026

Luiz Ricardo Alves (born 11 January 1994 in Rio de Janeiro), commonly known as Sassá, is a Brazilian footballer who plays as a forward for Nacional-AM, on loan from Confiança.

== Club career ==
=== Botafogo ===
Sassá made his league debut for Botafogo during the 2012 season.

== Career statistics ==
As of 21 February 2020

Club	Season	League			State League		Cup		Continental		Other		Total	
Club	Season	Division	Apps	Goals	Apps	Goals	Apps	Goals	Apps	Goals	Apps	Goals	Apps	Goals
Botafogo	2012	Série A	3	1	—		0	0	—		—		3	1
Botafogo	2013	Série A	4	0	3	1	4	0	—		—		11	1
Botafogo	2014	Série A	2	0	4	0	0	0	—		—		6	0
Botafogo	2015	Série B	22	7	16	1	4	3	—		—		42	11
Botafogo	2016	Série A	26	12	1	0	4	2	—		—		24	13
Botafogo	2017	Série A	0	0	8	3	0	0	1	0	—		9	3
Botafogo	Subtotal		57	20	32	5	12	5	1	0	—		95	29
Oeste (loan)	2014	Série B	0	0	3	0	—		—		—		3	0
Náutico (loan)	2014	Série B	22	9	—		—		—		—		22	9
Cruzeiro	2017	Série A	15	5	—		—		—		2	1	17	6
Cruzeiro	2018	Série A	16	2	3	0	2	0	6	5	—		27	7
Cruzeiro	2019	Série A	24	3	8	1	3	0	2	2	—		37	6
Cruzeiro	Subtotal		55	10	11	1	5	0	8	7	2	1	81	19
Coritiba (loan)	2020	Série A	0	0	4	3	1	0	—		—		5	3
Career total			134	39	50	9	18	5	9	7	2	1	206	60
