= Gervasio Núñez =

Argentine footballer (born 1988)

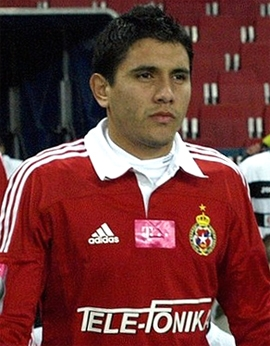
- A portrait of Gervasio Daniel Núñez

Personal information
- Full name: Gervasio Daniel Núñez
- Date of birth: 29 January 1988 (age 38)
- Place of birth: Formosa, Argentina
- Height: 1.80 m (5 ft 11 in)
- Position: Midfielder

Team information
- Current team: San Martín de Formosa
- Number: 10

Youth career
- Academia Ernesto Duchini
- Rosario Central

Senior career*
Years	Team	Apps	(Gls)
2007–2010	Rosario Central	62	(5)
2010–2012	Quilmes	23	(0)
2011–2012	→ Wisła Kraków (loan)	24	(0)
2013–2014	Rangers	44	(5)
2014–2015	Sarmiento	44	(11)
2016–2017	Botafogo	20	(1)
2017	Sarmiento	14	(3)
2017–2019	Atlético Tucumán	37	(5)
2019–2020	Central Córdoba SdE	17	(1)
2020	Belgrano	6	(1)
2021	Blooming	6	(0)
2021–2022	Sarmiento	19	(0)
2023	San Martín de Tucumán	16	(0)
2024	Ciudad de Bolivar	8	(0)
2024–2025	Guastatoya	11	(0)
2025–	San Martín de Formosa	32	(5)
- * Club domestic league appearances and goals as of 15:27, 07 January 2026 (UTC)

Gervasio Daniel Núñez (born 29 January 1988) is an Argentine professional footballer who plays as a midfielder for San Martín de Formosa in the Torneo Federal A of Argentina.

== Career ==
Born in Formosa, Núñez began his career at Academia Ernesto Duchini before moving to the Rosario Central youth team. He progressed to make his first team debut on 9 March 2007 in a 2–0 away defeat to Independiente. He scored his first goal for the club on 29 October 2008 in a 3–0 home win against Gimnasia y Esgrima de Jujuy.

Núñez was part of the Rosario Central team that was relegated during the 2009-10 Argentine Primera División season. For the following season, Núñez joined recently promoted Primera División team Quilmes.

On 1 July 2011, Núñez signed a one-year loan deal with Polish Ekstraklasa champions Wisła Kraków.

In January 2017, Núñez joined Sarmiento in the Argentine Primera División.

On 29 September 2020, Club Atlético Belgrano officially announced his signing.

In 2021, he moved to Blooming in the Bolivian First Division, and later that year, he joined Sarmiento in the Argentine First Division.

In 2023, he signed with San Martín de Tucumán.

In 2024, he joined Ciudad Bolívar, and later that year, he moved to CD Guastatoya in the Guatemalan National League.

In 2025, he signed with San Martín de Formosa in the Torneo Federal A.

== Statistics ==
(correct as of 8 May 2012)

Club	Season	League	Domestic League		Domestic Cups		Continental Cups		Play-offs		Total	
Club	Season	League	Apps	Goals	Apps	Goals	Apps	Goals	Apps	Goals	Apps	Goals
Rosario Central	Clausura 2007	Primera División	1	0	–		–		–		1	0
Rosario Central	2007–2008	Primera División	10	0	–		–		–		10	0
Rosario Central	2008–2009	Primera División	15	2	–		–		–		15	2
Rosario Central	2009–2010	Primera División	36	3	–		–		1	0	37	3
Quilmes	2010–2011	Primera División	22	0	–		–		–		22	0
Wisła Kraków	2011–2012	Ekstraklasa	24	0	5	0	13	0	–		42	0
Total	Rosario Central		62	5	–		–		1	0	63	5
