= Bruno Lopes (footballer, born 1995) =

Brazilian footballer

Personal information
- Full name: Bruno Henrique Lopes
- Date of birth: 19 May 1995 (age 31)
- Place of birth: Londrina, Brazil
- Height: 1.75 m (5 ft 9 in)
- Position: Forward

Team information
- Current team: Oeste

Youth career
- Marcílio Dias
- 2011–2013: Criciúma

Senior career*
Years	Team	Apps	(Gls)
2013–2016	Criciúma	41	(9)
2016–2018	Arouca	6	(0)
2017	→ Brasil de Pelotas (loan)	19	(2)
2018–	Oeste	127	(23)
2020	→ CRB (loan)	6	(0)
2021	→ Brusque (loan)	6	(0)

International career
2014	Brazil U20		
- * Club domestic league appearances and goals as of 11:29, 19 December 2018 (UTC)

Bruno Henrique Lopes (born 19 May 1995) is a Brazilian footballer who plays for Oeste as a forward. He has also been capped at the youth international level.

== Club career ==
Born in Londrina, Lopes started his career with the youth setup of Marcílio Dias and switched to the academy of Criciúma in December 2011. With the youth team, he emerged as the top-scorer of the Copa do Brasil Sub-20. On 20 June 2013, he was promoted to the first team and his contract was extended till the end of 2017. On 8 August 2013, Lopes made his Série A debut and scored his first goal for the club in a 2–1 defeat against Cruzeiro. In his first season with the club, he won the Catarinense.

On 17 June 2016, Lopes moved abroad for the first time and signed for Portuguese club FC Arouca, after agreeing to a three-year deal. On 6 July, he scored twice in a 2–0 victory against Famalicão in a pre-season friendly. On 25 August, he made his first team defeat, coming as a substitute for Gegé in a 2–1 defeat against Greek club Olympiacos in the UEFA Europa League. On 13 January 2017, he was loaned out to Brazilian club Grêmio Esportivo Brasil till 30 June. Once his loan ended, his parent club refused to reloan him to the club.

On 8 January 2018, Lopes returned to Brazil and signed with second tier club Oeste. On 13 April, he scored his first Série B goal for the club in a 2–0 victory against CRB.

== International career ==
Lopes has been capped by the under-20. He represented the side in the 2014 Panda Cup, which was won by Brazil after defeating China by 4–1 in the final match.

== Career statistics ==
As of match played on 25 November 2018

Club	Season	National League			State League		Cup		Continental		Total	
Club	Season	Division	Apps	Goals	Apps	Goals	Apps	Goals	Apps	Goals	Apps	Goals
Criciúma	2013	Série A	3	1	2	0	0	0	—		5	1
Criciúma	2014	Série A	21	0	5	0	1	0	—		27	0
Criciúma	2015	Série B	9	1	14	3	2	1	—		25	5
Criciúma	2016	Série B	0	0	13	4	3	0	—		16	4
Criciúma	Total		33	2	34	7	6	1	—		73	10
Arouca	2016–17	Primeira Liga	0	0	—		3	0	1 (Note: Appearance in UEFA Europa League)	0	4	0
Arouca	2017–18	LigaPro	2	0	—		1	0	—		3	0
Arouca	Total		2	0	—		4	0	1	0	7	0
Brasil de Pelotas (loan)	2017	Série B	9	1	7	0	3	1	—		19	2
Oeste	2018	Série B	20	4	16	4	1	0	—		37	8
Career total			64	7	57	11	14	2	1	0	136	19

== Honours ==
Criciúma

- Campeonato Catarinense : 2013
