= Ezequiel (footballer, born 1998) =

Brazilian footballer

Personal information
- Full name: Ezequiel Santos da Silva
- Date of birth: 9 March 1998 (age 28)
- Place of birth: Rio de Janeiro, Brazil
- Height: 1.67 m (5 ft 6 in)
- Position: Winger

Team information
- Current team: Thep Xanh Nam Dinh
- Number: 8

Youth career
- Botafogo

Senior career*
Years	Team	Apps	(Gls)
2017–2019	Botafogo	24	(1)
2019	→ Sport Recife (loan)	29	(4)
2019	→ Cruzeiro (loan)	14	(0)
2020–2024	Sanfrecce Hiroshima	86	(9)
2025–2026	Athletic	19	(1)
2026	Spartak Subotica	13	(1)
2026–	Thep Xanh Nam Dinh	1	(2)
- * Club domestic league appearances and goals as of 5 September 2026

Ezequiel Santos da Silva (born 9 March 1998), simply known as Ezequiel, is a Brazilian professional footballer who plays as a winger for V.League 1 club Thep Xanh Nam Dinh.

== Career ==
On 14 January 2019, Sport Recife announced that they had loaned Ezequiel and his teammate Leandro from Botafogo for the 2019 season.

On 22 July 2026, Ezequiel moved to Vietnam, joining V.League 1 club Thep Xanh Nam Dinh.

== Career statistics ==
=== Club ===
As of 3 December 2023.

Club	Season	League			State League		Cup		League Cup		Continental		Other		Total	
Club	Season	Division	Apps	Goals	Apps	Goals	Apps	Goals	Apps	Goals	Apps	Goals	Apps	Goals	Apps	Goals
Botafogo	2017	Série A	2	1	0	0	0	0	—		—		—		2	1
Botafogo	2018	Série A	10	0	12	0	0	0	—		0	0	—		22	0
Botafogo	Total		12	1	12	0	0	0	0	0	0	0	0	0	24	1
Sport Recife (loan)	2019	Série B	16	0	13	4	1	0	—		—		0	0	30	4
Cruzeiro (loan)	2019	Série A	14	0	—		—		—		—		—		14	0
Sanfrecce Hiroshima	2020	J1 League	15	2	—		—		1	0	—		—		16	2
Sanfrecce Hiroshima	2021	J1 League	34	4	—		1	0	5	0	—		—		40	4
Sanfrecce Hiroshima	2022	J1 League	9	1	—		3	0	3	0	—		—		15	1
Sanfrecce Hiroshima	2023	J1 League	25	2	—		2	0	6	0	—		—		33	2
Sanfrecce Hiroshima	Total		83	9	0	0	6	0	15	0	0	0	0	0	104	9
Career total			125	10	25	4	7	0	15	0	0	0	0	0	172	14
