= 2011 SE Palmeiras season =

Palmeiras
2011 season
- President: Arnaldo Tirone
- Manager: Luiz Felipe Scolari
- Série A: 11th
- Campeonato Paulista: Semifinals
- Copa do Brasil: Quarterfinals
- Copa Sudamericana: Second Round
- Top goalscorer: League: Luan (9); All: Kleber (17)
- Highest home attendance: 36,299 (vs. Corinthians – 28 August)
- Lowest home attendance: 3,897 (vs. Figueirense – 22 October)
Home colours	Away colours	Third colours

The 2011 season was the 97th season in Palmeiras's existence, and their 96th in Brazil's first division. Palmeiras will also play the usual state league, Campeonato Paulista, the national cup, Copa do Brasil and the continental cup, the Copa Sudamericana.

Due to the renovations taking place at Palestra Itália for the construction of the new Arena, Palmeiras played all their home matches of the 2011 season, at Pacaembu and at the Canindé Stadium.

== Competitions ==
=== Friendlies ===
Palmeiras' first match in 2011 will be a friendly away against XV de Piracicaba on 12 January.

12 January 2011	XV de Piracicaba	2–2	Palmeiras	Piracicaba
18:30 UTC−03:00	Paulinho 4'; Adilson 87'	Report	16' Luan; 72' Dinei	Stadium: Barão da Serra Negra; Attendance: 3,184

=== Campeonato Paulista ===
In December 2010, the FPF announced that Palmeiras will face Botafogo-SP at the Pacaembu Stadium, Palmeiras's temporary home until 2012, for the 1st Round of the Campeonato Paulista. On 11 January 2011, the FPF announced the schedule of all matches in the 2011 Paulista.

==== First phase ====
Pos	Team	Pld	W	D	L	GF	GA	GD	Pts	Qualification or relegation
1	São Paulo	19	13	2	4	39	19	+20	41	Advanced to the Knockout stage
2	Palmeiras	19	12	5	2	28	8	+20	41	Advanced to the Knockout stage
3	Corinthians	19	11	5	3	33	12	+21	38	Advanced to the Knockout stage
4	Santos	19	11	5	3	40	20	+20	38	Advanced to the Knockout stage
5	Ponte Preta	19	9	5	5	22	16	+6	32	Advanced to the Knockout stage
6	Oeste	19	9	4	6	25	17	+8	31	Advanced to the Knockout stage
7	Mirassol	19	9	3	7	26	26	0	30	Advanced to the Knockout stage
8	Portuguesa	19	8	4	7	24	23	+1	28	Advanced to the Knockout stage

Updated to match(es) played on 17 April 2011. Source: UOL Esporte
Rules for classification: 1st points; 2nd wins; 3rd goal difference; 4th goals scored; 5th red cards received; 6th yellow cards received; 7th public draw

15 January 2011 1	Palmeiras	0–0	Botafogo-SP	São Paulo
19:30 UTC−02:00	Luan (yellow card); Kleber (yellow card)		(yellow card) Rodrigo Soares	Stadium: Estádio Municipal Paulo Machado de Carvalho (Pacaembu); Attendance: 7,433; Referee: Márcio Roberto Soares

20 January 2011 2	Ituano	1–4	Palmeiras	Piracicaba
21:00 UTC−02:00	Welton 44'		27' (pen.), 60' Kleber; 53' Dinei; 90+1' Tinga	Stadium: Barão da Serra Negra; Attendance: 4,551; Referee: Paulo César de Oliveira

23 January 2011 3	Oeste	0–1	Palmeiras	Itápolis
19:30 UTC−02:00	Rafael Caldeira (yellow card); Paulo Miranda (yellow card); Dionísio (yellow card); Alex William (yellow card); Fábio (yellow card)		(yellow card) Rivaldo; (yellow card) Dinei; 86' Patrik	Stadium: Amaros; Attendance: 4,302; Referee: Welton Orlando Wohnrath

27 January 2011 4	Palmeiras	3–1	Paulista	São Paulo
21:50 UTC−02:00	M. Assunção 19'; Kleber 43'; Patrik 66'		80' (o.g.) Maurício Ramos	Stadium: Estádio Municipal Paulo Machado de Carvalho (Pacaembu); Attendance: 6,353; Referee: Vinicius Furlan

30 January 2011 5	Portuguesa	0–2	Palmeiras	São Paulo
17:00 UTC−02:00	Preto Costa (yellow card); Domingos (yellow card)		(yellow card) João Vitor; (yellow card) (goal) 90+1' Kleber; 81' Cicinho	Stadium: Estádio Oswaldo Teixeira Duarte (Canindé); Attendance: 9,304; Referee: Raphael Claus

2 February 2011 6	Mirassol	0–1	Palmeiras	Mirassol
22:00 UTC−02:00	Esley (yellow card); Diego (yellow card); Dezinho (yellow card)		77' Patrik	Stadium: Estádio Municipal de Mirassol; Attendance: 3,981; Referee: Flavio Rodrigues de Souza

6 February 2011 7	Palmeiras	0–1	Corinthians	São Paulo
17:00 UTC−02:00	Tinga (yellow card) 43'; Patrik (yellow card) 85'		(yellow card) 30' L. Castán; 82' (yellow card) 83' Alessandro	Stadium: Estádio Municipal Paulo Machado de Carvalho (Pacaembu); Attendance: 23,714; Referee: Antonio Rogério Batista do Prado

12 February 2011 8	Palmeiras	1–0	Americana	São Paulo
19:30 UTC−02:00	Kleber 53'			Stadium: Estádio Municipal Paulo Machado de Carvalho (Pacaembu); Attendance: 8,385; Referee: Rodrigo Braghetto

20 February 2011 9	Mogi Mirim	0–0	Palmeiras	Moji-Mirim
16:00 UTC−02:00	Audálio (yellow card); Everton (yellow card); Roberto Jacaré (yellow card)		(yellow card) Danilo	Stadium: Estádio Romildo Ferreira; Attendance: 7,710; Referee: Rodrigo Guarizo Ferreira do Amaral

27 February 2011 10	São Paulo	1–1	Palmeiras	São Paulo
17:00 UTC−03:00	Fernandinho 25'; Miranda (yellow card) 16'; Dagoberto (yellow card) 48'; Alex Silva (red card) 53'		(yellow card) 10' Danilo; (yellow card) 55' M. Assunção; 84' Adriano	Stadium: Estádio Cícero Pompeu de Toledo (Morumbi); Attendance: 26,238; Referee: Marcelo Aparecido Ribeiro de Souza

5 March 2011 11	Palmeiras	0–0	Santo André	São Paulo
18:45 UTC−03:00	Gabriel Silva (yellow card); Patrik (yellow card)		(yellow card) Vitor Hugo; (yellow card) Magno; (red card) Gilberto	Stadium: Estádio Municipal Paulo Machado de Carvalho (Pacaembu); Attendance: 6,059; Referee: Rodrigo Braghetto

9 March 2011 12	Noroeste	1–2	Palmeiras	Bauru
19:30 UTC−03:00	Giovanni 17'; Mateus (yellow card); Vandinho (yellow card)		(yellow card) Gabriel Silva; 82' Valdivia; 85' Vinícius	Stadium: Estádio Alfredo de Castilho; Attendance: 5,024; Referee: Flávio Rodrigues Guerra

12 March 2011 13	Palmeiras	2–0	São Bernardo	São Paulo
18:30 UTC−03:00	Danilo 23'; Patrik 31'; Márcio Araújo (yellow card)		(yellow card) Dirceu; (yellow card) Amarildo; (yellow card) Willian Favone	Stadium: Estádio Oswaldo Teixeira Duarte (Canindé); Attendance: 7,676; Referee: Welton Orlando Wohnrath

20 March 2011 14	São Caetano	1–1	Palmeiras	São Caetano do Sul
16:00 UTC−03:00	Artur (yellow card) 24' (goal) 35'; Thiago Martinelli (yellow card) 38'; Jean Rolt (yellow card) 50'; Augusto Recife (yellow card) 73'; Anderson (red card) 63'; Henrique Dias (yellow card) 80'		6' (pen.) Kleber; (yellow card) 19' Luan; (red card) 63' Thiago Heleno	Stadium: Estádio Anacleto Campanella; Attendance: 9,527; Referee: Guilherme Ceretta de Lima

23 March 2011 15	Palmeiras	3–0	Linense	Barueri
19:30 UTC−03:00	Danilo (yellow card) 22'; Patrik 38', 60'; Kleber 42' (pen.) (yellow card) 44'; M. Assunção (yellow card) 76'		(yellow card) 35' Gilsinho; (yellow card) 51' Tarracha; (yellow card) 87' Bruno Quadros	Stadium: Arena Barueri; Attendance: 3,986; Referee: Paulo Roberto de Sousa Júnior

26 March 2011 16	Palmeiras	3–0	Bragantino	São Paulo
18:30 UTC−03:00	Thiago Heleno 2', 35'; Cicinho (yellow card) 29'; Patrik (yellow card) 67'; João Vitor 87'		(yellow card) 14' Everaldo; (yellow card) 37' Cristian; (yellow card) 69' Júnior Lopes; (yellow card) 78' Carlinhos	Stadium: Estádio Oswaldo Teixeira Duarte (Canindé); Attendance: 10,460; Referee: Magno de Sousa Lima Neto

3 April 2011 17	Santos	0–1	Palmeiras	Santos
16:00 UTC−03:00	Neymar (yellow card) 7'; Elano (yellow card) 39'; Durval (yellow card) 84'		(yellow card) 15' Danilo; (yellow card) 48' Rivaldo; 79' (yellow card) 90+3' Kleber; (yellow card) 87' Patrik	Stadium: Estádio Urbano Caldeira (Vila Belmiro); Attendance: 10,719; Referee: Vinícius Furlan

9 April 2011 18	Palmeiras	2–0	Grêmio Prudente	São Paulo
18:00 UTC−03:00	Thiago Heleno 30' (yellow card) 53'; M. Assunção (yellow card) 65'; Douglas 74' (o.g.); Gabriel Silva (yellow card) 87'		(yellow card) 40' Wanderson Cafu; (yellow card) 45+1' Elivelton; (yellow card) 60' Daniel; (yellow card) 89' Douglas	Stadium: Estádio Oswaldo Teixeira Duarte (Canindé); Attendance: 13,557; Referee: Flávio Rodrigues Guerra

17 April 2011 19	Ponte Preta	2–1	Palmeiras	Campinas
16:00 UTC−03:00	Josimar (yellow card) 13'; Márcio Diogo 24'; Renatinho 75' (yellow card) 76'; Tiago Luis (yellow card) 80'; Eduardo Arroz (yellow card) 90'		20' Max Santos; (yellow card) 81' Rivaldo; (yellow card) 83' Chico; (yellow card) 90' Luan	Stadium: Estádio Moisés Lucarelli; Attendance: 9,956; Referee: Sálvio Spínola Fagundes Filho

Last updated: 17 April 2011
Source: S.E. Palmeiras

==== Second phase ====
24 April 2011 Quarter-final	Palmeiras	2–1	Mirassol	São Paulo
18:30 UTC−03:00	Valdivia 10'; Rivaldo (yellow card) 16'; Danilo (yellow card) 21'; Márcio Araújo 56'; Tinga (yellow card) 72'; Deola (yellow card) 90'		(yellow card) 12' Esley; (yellow card) 38' (yellow-red card) 58' Xuxa; 40' Marcelinho; (yellow card) 58' Dezinho	Stadium: Estádio Municipal Paulo Machado de Carvalho (Pacaembu); Attendance: 17,538; Referee: Guilherme Ceretta de Lima

1 May 2011 Semi-final	Palmeiras	1–1 (5–6 p)	Corinthians	São Paulo
16:00 UTC−03:00	Kleber (yellow card) 3'; Danilo (red card) 23'; Leandro Amaro 52'		(yellow card) 36' Alessandro; (yellow card) 43' Fábio Santos; (yellow card) 50' Bruno César; 64' Willian; (yellow card) 71' Ralf; (yellow card) 82' L. Castán	Stadium: Estádio Municipal Paulo Machado de Carvalho (Pacaembu); Attendance: 33,861; Referee: Paulo César de Oliveira
	Penalties
	Kleber (penalty scored); M. Assunção (penalty scored); Márcio Araújo (penalty scored); Luan (penalty scored); Thiago Heleno (penalty scored); João Vitor (penalty missed)		(penalty scored) Chicão; (penalty scored) Willian; (penalty scored) Fábio Santos; (penalty scored) L. Castán; (penalty scored) Morais; (penalty scored) Ramírez

Last updated: 2 May 2011
Source: S.E. Palmeiras

=== Copa do Brasil ===
On 19 January, CBF announced the fixtures for the 1st Round of the 2011 Copa do Brasil. Palmeiras faced Comercial from the state of Piauí, playing the 1st leg away, on 23 February in Teresina and the 2nd leg home, on 2 March in São Paulo. Palmeiras advanced to the Second Phase of the competition, and faced Uberaba in Minas Gerais, winning by the score of 4–0 and securing a place in the Round of 16. In the last eight round, Palmeiras played against Santo André and won by the aggregate score of 3–1, advancing to the Quarterfinals. In the 1st leg of the Round of 16, Palmeiras suffered a shocking defeat by the score of 6–0 to Coritiba, the team didn't play football at all and Coritiba was magnificent. In the 2nd leg, Palmeiras conquered a 2–0 victory at home against Coritiba, but it wasn't enough to achieve qualification to the tournaments semifinals.

First phase

23 February 2011 1st leg	Comercial-PI	1–2	Palmeiras	Teresina
21:50 UTC−03:00	Thiago (yellow card) 34'; Isael (yellow card) 55'; Binha (yellow card) 61'; Rafael 75'; Alisson (yellow card) 82'	Report	(yellow card) 13' Maurício Ramos; 30' Adriano; 46' Kleber; (yellow card) 69' Valdivia	Stadium: Estádio Governador Alberto Tavares Silva (Albertão); Attendance: 13,482; Referee: José de Caldas Souza (Distrito Federal)

2 March 2011 2nd leg	Palmeiras	5–1 (7–2 agg.)	Comercial-PI	São Paulo
21:50 UTC−03:00	M. Assunção (yellow card) 8'; Thiago Heleno (yellow card) 39'; Adriano 61', 65', 77', 79'; Gabriel Silva 83'; Cicinho (yellow card) 89'	Report	(yellow card) 27' Isael; (yellow card) 62' Thiago; (red card) 66' Rafael; 73' Binha; (red card) 78' Evandro	Stadium: Estádio Municipal Paulo Machado de Carvalho (Pacaembu); Attendance: 3,509; Referee: Marcio Chagas da Silva (Rio Grande do Sul)

Second phase

16 March 2011	Uberaba	0–4	Palmeiras	Uberaba
21:50 UTC−03:00	Balduíno (yellow card) 29'; Gabriel (yellow card) 38'; Rodrigão (yellow card) 71'; Hugo (yellow card) 80'	Report	11', 22' Luan; 42', 90+1' Kleber; (yellow card) 74' Thiago Heleno	Stadium: Estádio Municipal Engenheiro João Guido (Uberabão); Attendance: 11,671; Referee: Pablo Alves dos Santos (Espírito Santo)

Round of 16

13 April 2011 1st leg	Santo André	1–2	Palmeiras	Santo André
21:50 UTC−03:00	Magno (yellow card) 17'; Marcelo Godri (yellow card) 20'; Alex Silva (yellow card) 34'; Dênis (yellow card) 44'; Borebi (yellow card) 64'; Sandoval (yellow card) 67'; Anderson 88'; Vitor Hugo (red card) 90+5'	Report	22', 69' Kleber	Stadium: Estádio Bruno José Daniel; Attendance: 7,635; Referee: Guilherme Ceretta de Lima (São Paulo)

21 April 2011 2nd leg	Palmeiras	1–0 (3–1 agg.)	Santo André	São Paulo
16:00 UTC−03:00	Valdivia (yellow card) 24'; Luan (yellow card) 36'; Thiago Heleno (yellow card) 45+2'; Danilo 77'	Report	(yellow card) 3' Alex Silva; (yellow card) 19' Mario Jara; (yellow card) 45' João Paulo; (yellow card) 75' Magno; (red card) 82' Anderson; (yellow card) 84' Neneca	Stadium: Estádio Municipal Paulo Machado de Carvalho (Pacaembu); Attendance: 33,614; Referee: Raphael Claus (São Paulo)

Quarter-finals

5 May 2011 1st leg	Coritiba	6–0	Palmeiras	Curitiba
19:30 UTC−03:00	L. Donizete (yellow card) 1'; Emerson 11'; Davi 21'; Léo Gago 43'; Bill 55' (pen.); Rafinha (yellow card) 58'; Cleiton (yellow card) 88'; A. Aquino 90+1'; Geraldo 90+2'	Report	(yellow card) 33' Luan; (yellow card) 38' João Vitor; (yellow card) 60' (red card) 62' Rivaldo	Stadium: Estádio Major Antônio Couto Pereira; Attendance: 28,870; Referee: Leandro Vuaden (Rio Grande do Sul)

11 May 2011 2nd leg	Palmeiras	2–0 (2–6 agg.)	Coritiba	São Paulo
21:50 UTC−03:00	Kleber (yellow card) 35'; Emerson 46' (o.g.); M. Assunção 64'	Report	(yellow card) 18' (red card) 61' Bill; (yellow card) 22' Lucas Mendes; (yellow card) 74' Marcos Paulo	Stadium: Estádio Municipal Paulo Machado de Carvalho (Pacaembu); Attendance: 6,968; Referee: Nielson Nogueira Dias (Pernambuco)

=== Campeonato Brasileiro ===
The draw for the most important competition in Brazil was announced by CBF in early April. The first round is scheduled for 22 May.

22 May 2011 1	Palmeiras	1–0	Botafogo	São José do Rio Preto
16:00 UTC−03:00	Thiago Heleno (yellow card) 29'; Kleber (yellow card) 34' (goal) 64'	Report	(yellow card) 24' Lucas; (yellow card) 26' Marcelo Mattos	Stadium: Estádio Benedito Teixeira (Teixeirão); Attendance: 13,705; Referee: Márcio Chagas da Silva (Rio Grande do Sul)

29 May 2011 2	Cruzeiro	1–1	Palmeiras	Sete Lagoas
16:00 UTC−03:00	Thiago Ribeiro (yellow card) 61'; Gil (yellow card) 67'; Anselmo Ramon 73'	Report	59' (yellow card) 65' Luan; (yellow card) 78' Márcio Araújo	Stadium: Estádio Joaquim Henrique Nogueira (Arena do Jacaré); Attendance: 9,080; Referee: Wilton Pereira Sampaio (Distrito Federal)

4 June 2011 3	Palmeiras	1–0	Atlético Paranaense	São Paulo
18:30 UTC−03:00	Kleber (yellow card) 32'; Patrik (yellow card) 54'; Chico (yellow card) 70' (goal) 75'	Report	(yellow card) 15' Deivid; (yellow card) 26' (red card) 57' Rômulo	Stadium: Estádio Oswaldo Teixeira Duarte (Canindé); Attendance: 10,372; Referee: Péricles Bassols Cortez (Rio de Janeiro)

12 June 2011 4	Internacional	2–2	Palmeiras	Porto Alegre
16:00 UTC−03:00	Márcio Araújo 50' (o.g.); Zé Roberto (yellow card) 57'; Gilberto (yellow card) 79'; Leandro Damião 90'	Report	(yellow card) 21' Patrik; (yellow card) 29' (goal) 65' Luan; (yellow card) 32' M. Assunção; 54' (o.g.) Rodrigo; (yellow card) 56' Danilo	Stadium: Estádio José Pinheiro Borda (Beira-Rio); Attendance: 20,394; Referee: Gutemberg de Paula Fonseca (Rio de Janeiro)

19 June 2011 5	Palmeiras	5–0	Avaí	São Paulo
16:00 UTC−03:00	George Lucas 18' (o.g.); Luan 21', 40' (yellow card) 76'; Kleber 42', 71' (pen.); W. Paulista (yellow card) 54'	Report	(yellow card) 9' Julinho; (yellow card) 23' Bruno Silva; (yellow card) 57' M. Guerreiro; (yellow card) 75' Acleisson	Stadium: Estádio Oswaldo Teixeira Duarte (Canindé); Attendance: 12,138; Referee: Fabrício Neves Corrêa (Rio Grande do Sul)

26 June 2011 6	Ceará	2–0	Palmeiras	Fortaleza
16:00 UTC−03:00	Washington 7'; T. Humberto 45'; João Marcos (yellow card) 59'	Report	(yellow card) 35' W. Paulista; (yellow card) 89' Thiago Heleno	Stadium: Estádio Presidente Vargas; Attendance: 11,092; Referee: Heber Roberto Lopes (Paraná)

30 June 2011 7	Palmeiras	2–0	Atlético Goianiense	São Paulo
19:30 UTC−03:00	Maikon Leite 27'; M. Assunção 33' (pen.); Luan (yellow card) 77'; Tinga (yellow card) 90+2'	Report	(yellow card) 21' Bida; (yellow card) 84' Rafael Cruz	Stadium: Estádio Oswaldo Teixeira Duarte (Canindé); Attendance: 9,450; Referee: Nielson Nogueira Dias (Pernambuco)

6 July 2011 8	América Mineiro	1–1	Palmeiras	Sete Lagoas
21:50 UTC−03:00	Fabrício (yellow card) 43'; Alessandro 65'; Kempes (yellow card) 67'; Marcos Rocha (yellow card) 74'	Report	(yellow card) 12' (goal) 75' Maurício Ramos; (yellow card) 53' Thiago Heleno; (yellow card) 88' Maikon Leite	Stadium: Estádio Joaquim Henrique Nogueira (Arena do Jacaré); Attendance: 1,503; Referee: Pablo dos Santos Alves (Espírito Santo)

10 July 2011 9	Palmeiras	3–0	Santos	São Paulo
18:30 UTC−03:00	Maikon Leite 20'; Maurício Ramos 29'; Patrik 44'; João Vitor (yellow card) 78'	Report	(yellow card) 51' Léo; (yellow card) 90' Pará	Stadium: Estádio Municipal Paulo Machado de Carvalho (Pacaembu); Attendance: 16,571; Referee: Luiz Flávio de Oliveira (São Paulo)

20 July 2011 10	Palmeiras	0–0	Flamengo	São Paulo
21:45 UTC−03:00	Luan (yellow card) 39'; Gabriel Silva (yellow card) 55'	Report	(yellow card) 31' R. Angelim; (yellow card) 70' Thiago Neves; (yellow card) 84' Ronaldinho	Stadium: Estádio Municipal Paulo Machado de Carvalho (Pacaembu); Attendance: 33,575; Referee: Leandro Vuaden (Rio Grande do Sul)

24 July 2011 11	Fluminense	1–0	Palmeiras	Volta Redonda
16:00 UTC−03:00	Márcio Rozário (yellow card) 13'; Deco (yellow card) 42'; Edinho (yellow card) 64'; Marquinho 74'; Fred (yellow card) 78'	Report	(yellow card) 27' Rivaldo; (yellow card) 44' Thiago Heleno; (yellow card) 45+1' Cicinho; (yellow card) 72' Márcio Araújo; (yellow card) 78' Maurício Ramos	Stadium: Estádio General Raulino de Oliveira; Attendance: 9,214; Referee: Heber Roberto Lopes (Paraná)

27 July 2011 12	Figueirense	0–1	Palmeiras	Florianópolis
21:50 UTC−03:00	Ygor (yellow card) 55'	Report	(yellow card) 39' Thiago Heleno; (yellow card) 50' Gerley; (yellow card) 60' Maikon Leite; (yellow card) 66' M. Assunção; 82' Maurício Ramos; (yellow card) 86' Márcio Araújo; (yellow card) 90' Kleber	Stadium: Estádio Orlando Scarpelli; Attendance: 7,932; Referee: Alício Pena Júnior (Minas Gerais)

30 July 2011 13	Palmeiras	3–2	Atlético Mineiro	São Paulo
21:00 UTC−03:00	M. Assunção 14'; Luan 61'; João Vitor (yellow card) 62'; Patrik 80'	Report	15' Magno Alves; (yellow card) 49' Serginho; 81' Wesley	Stadium: Estádio Oswaldo Teixeira Duarte (Canindé); Attendance: 9,983; Referee: Sandro Meira Ricci (Distrito Federal)

3 August 2011 14	Coritiba	1–1	Palmeiras	Curitiba
21:50 UTC−03:00	Jéci 8'; Léo Gago (yellow card) 38'; Eltinho (yellow card) 61'; L. Donizete (yellow card) 86'	Report	(yellow card) 16' Valdivia; (yellow card) 17' Kleber; (yellow card) 17' Luan; 19' M. Assunção; (red card) 76' Thiago Heleno	Stadium: Estádio Major Antônio Couto Pereira; Attendance: 18,800; Referee: Célio Amorim (Santa Catarina)

6 August 2011 15	Palmeiras	0–0	Grêmio	São Paulo
18:30 UTC−03:00	M. Assunção (yellow card) 8'; Gerley (yellow card) 49'; Henrique (yellow card) 83'; Valdivia (yellow card) 86'	Report	(yellow card) 24' Vilson; (yellow card) 29' Douglas; (yellow card) 38' Rafael Marques	Stadium: Estádio Oswaldo Teixeira Duarte (Canindé); Attendance: 15,762; Referee: Ricardo Marques Ribeiro (Minas Gerais)

14 August 2011 16	Vasco	1–0	Palmeiras	Rio de Janeiro
16:00 UTC−03:00	Renato Silva (yellow card) 44'; Bernardo (yellow card) 63' (goal) 80'; Fagner (yellow card) 64'; Julinho (yellow card) 72'; Victor Ramos (yellow card) 90+1'	Report	(yellow card) 31' Dinei; (yellow card) 37' Henrique; (yellow card) 69' Luan; (yellow card) 76' Cicinho	Stadium: Estádio Club de Regatas Vasco da Gama (São Januário); Attendance: 7,830; Referee: Márcio Chagas da Silva (Rio Grande do Sul)

18 August 2011 17	Palmeiras	1–1	Bahia	São Paulo
21:00 UTC−03:00	Thiago Heleno (yellow card) 8'; Gerley (yellow card) 21'; Kleber (yellow card) 47'; Valdivia 53' (yellow card) 64'; Luan (yellow card) 58'	Report	(yellow card) 21' Carlos Alberto; (yellow card) 24' (goal) 67' Titi; (yellow card) 88' Ávine	Stadium: Estádio Oswaldo Teixeira Duarte (Canindé); Attendance: 6,266; Referee: André Luiz de Freitas Castro (Goiás)

21 August 2011 18	São Paulo	1–1	Palmeiras	São Paulo
16:00 UTC−03:00	Dagoberto 41'	Report	61' Henrique; (yellow card) 73' Cicinho	Stadium: Estádio Cícero Pompeu de Toledo (Morumbi); Attendance: 16,813; Referee: Cléber Wellington Abade (São Paulo)

28 August 2011 19	Palmeiras	2–1	Corinthians	Presidente Prudente
16:00 UTC−03:00	Gabriel Silva (yellow card) 5'; Luan 34' (yellow card) 75'; Fernandão 52'; Valdivia (yellow card) 55'; Chico (yellow card) 71'	Report	18' Emerson; (yellow card) 24' L. Castán; (yellow card) 28' J. Henrique; (yellow card) 71' Paulinho	Stadium: Estádio Eduardo José Farah (Prudentão); Attendance: 36,299; Referee: Luiz Flávio de Oliveira (São Paulo)

31 August 2011 20	Botafogo	3–1	Palmeiras	Rio de Janeiro
21:50 UTC−03:00	Herrera 3'; Gustavo 22'; Cortês (yellow card) 43'; Maicosuel 62'; Elkeson (yellow card) 86'	Report	(yellow card) 36' Rivaldo; (yellow card) 42' Cicinho; 90+1' M. Assunção	Stadium: Estádio Olímpico João Havelange (Engenhão); Attendance: 9,729; Referee: Francisco Carlos Nascimento (Alagoas)

4 September 2011 21	Palmeiras	1–1	Cruzeiro	São Paulo
16:00 UTC−03:00	Gabriel Silva (yellow card) 32'; Maurício Ramos (yellow card) 53'; Luan 68'	Report	(yellow card) 42' Gabriel Araújo; (yellow card) 51' Marquinhos Paraná; (yellow card) 83' Leandro Guerreiro; 84' (yellow card) 87' Montillo; (yellow card) 90' Gilberto	Stadium: Estádio Municipal Paulo Machado de Carvalho (Pacaembu); Attendance: 10,345; Referee: Leandro Vuaden (Rio Grande do Sul)

7 September 2011 22	Atlético Paranaense	2–2	Palmeiras	Curitiba
21:50 UTC−03:00	Marcelo Oliveira (yellow card) 13'; Deivid (yellow card) 17'; Guerrón 34'; Cléber Santana (yellow card) 36' (yellow-red card) 36'; Kléberson (yellow card) 66'; Marcinho 70' (pen.); Madson (yellow card) 89'	Report	(yellow card) 12' Thiago Heleno; 14' Henrique; (yellow card) 51' Kleber; 52' Fernandão; (yellow card) 65' João Vitor; (yellow card) 69' Marcos; (yellow card) 87' Tinga; (yellow card) 89' Cicinho	Stadium: Estádio Joaquim Américo Guimarães (Arena da Baixada); Attendance: 12,219; Referee: Marcelo de Lima Henrique (Rio de Janeiro)

11 September 2011 23	Palmeiras	0–3	Internacional	São Paulo
16:00 UTC−03:00	Patrik (yellow card) 42'; Gabriel Silva (yellow card) 90+3'	Report	25', 83', 90' Leandro Damião; (yellow card) 28' D'Alessandro; (yellow card) 38' Sandro Silva; (yellow card) 45' Oscar; (yellow card) 61' Kléber; (yellow card) 77' Muriel	Stadium: Estádio Municipal Paulo Machado de Carvalho (Pacaembu); Attendance: 9,702; Referee: Alício Pena Júnior (Minas Gerais)

18 September 2011 24	Avaí	1–1	Palmeiras	Florianópolis
16:00 UTC−03:00	Batista 5', (yellow card) 17'; Pedro Ken (yellow card) 10'; Bruno Silva (yellow card) 53'; Rafael Coelho (red card) 61'; Gian (yellow card) 84'	Report	(yellow card) 12' (yellow-red card) 23' Rivaldo; (yellow card) 21' Kleber; 41' Chico; (red card) 48' Gerley	Stadium: Estádio Aderbal Ramos da Silva (Ressacada); Attendance: 8,312; Referee: Evandro Rogério Roman (Paraná)

22 September 2011 25	Palmeiras	1–0	Ceará	São Paulo
20:30 UTC−03:00	M. Assunção (yellow card) 7'; Thiago Matias 43' (o.g.); Luan (yellow card) 53'; Chico (yellow card) 85'	Report	(yellow card) 51' Heleno; (yellow card) 55' Roger	Stadium: Estádio Oswaldo Teixeira Duarte (Canindé); Attendance: 6,629; Referee: Wagner Nascimento Magalhães (Rio de Janeiro)

25 September 2011 26	Atlético Goianiense	1–1	Palmeiras	Goiânia
18:00 UTC−03:00	Agenor (yellow card) 17'; Anderson (yellow card) 23' (yellow-red card) 43'; Pituca (yellow card) 46'; Rafael Cruz (yellow card) 57'; Vitor Júnior (yellow card) 60', (yellow card) 61', (red card) 61'; Thiago Feltri 80'	Report	(yellow card) 15' Márcio Araújo; 24' Henrique; (yellow card) 40' Luan; (yellow card) 45+1' Fernandão; (yellow card) 60' João Vitor; (yellow card) 76' M. Assunção	Stadium: Estádio do Governo do Estado de Goiás (Serra Dourada); Attendance: 12,422; Referee: Francisco Carlos Nascimento (Alagoas)

1 October 2011 27	Palmeiras	1–1	América Mineiro	São Paulo
18:00 UTC−03:00	M. Assunção 29'; Luan (yellow card) 57'; Chico (yellow card) 58'	Report	(yellow card) 18' Gilson; (yellow card) 40' André Dias; 45' Kempes; (yellow card) 53' Amaral; (yellow card) 60' Fábio Júnior; (yellow card) 66' Anderson; (yellow card) 69' Micão; (yellow card) 87' Marcos Rocha; (yellow card) 90+1' Rodriguinho	Stadium: Estádio Oswaldo Teixeira Duarte (Canindé); Attendance: 9,285; Referee: Jaílson Macedo Freitas (Bahia)

9 October 2011 28	Santos	1–0	Palmeiras	Santos
16:00 UTC−03:00	Ibson (yellow card) 40'; Borges 74'	Report	(yellow card) 43' Pedro Carmona	Stadium: Estádio Urbano Caldeira (Vila Belmiro); Attendance: 7,373; Referee: Guilherme Cereta de Lima (São Paulo)

12 October 2011 29	Flamengo	1–1	Palmeiras	Rio de Janeiro
21:50 UTC−03:00	Willians (yellow card) 34'; Thiago Neves 55'; Alex Silva (yellow card) 77'; Negueba (yellow card) 84'	Report	(yellow card) 32' Marcos Assunção; (yellow card) 36' Patrik; (yellow card) 40' Cicinho; (yellow card) 60' Thiago Heleno; 63' Maikon Leite	Stadium: Estádio Olímpico João Havelange (Engenhão); Attendance: 22,573; Referee: Emerson de Almeida Ferreira (Minas Gerais)

16 October 2011 30	Palmeiras	1–2	Fluminense	São Paulo
16:00 UTC−03:00	Valdivia (yellow card) 42', (goal) 72' (pen.); Thiago Heleno (yellow card) 73'; Chico (yellow card) 78'	Report	10', 85' (yellow card) 69' Fred; (yellow card) 43' Márcio Rozário; (yellow card) 52' Marquinho; (yellow card) 57' Carlinhos	Stadium: Estádio Oswaldo Teixeira Duarte (Canindé); Attendance: 3,649; Referee: Francisco Carlos do Nascimento (Alagoas)

22 October 2011 31	Palmeiras	1–2	Figueirense	São Paulo
17:00 UTC−03:00	Ricardo Bueno 90+3'	Report	10' Wellington Nem; (yellow card) 43', (goal) 75' Júlio César	Stadium: Estádio Oswaldo Teixeira Duarte (Canindé); Attendance: 3,897; Referee: Ricardo Marques Ribeiro (Minas Gerais)

30 October 2011 32	Atlético Mineiro	2–1	Palmeiras	Sete Lagoas
17:00 UTC−03:00	Pierre (yellow card) 23'; Neto Berola 36'; Daniel Carvalho (yellow card) 42'; Fillipe Soutto 62'	Report	(yellow card) 14' (yellow-red card) 73' Valdivia; (yellow card) 53' Cicinho; (red card) 67' Maurício Ramos; 83' Luan	Stadium: Estádio Joaquim Henrique Nogueira (Arena do Jacaré); Attendance: 17,189; Referee: Marcelo de Lima Henrique (Rio de Janeiro)

6 November 2011 33	Palmeiras	0–2	Coritiba	Barueri
18:00 UTC−03:00	Thiago Heleno (yellow card) 26'; Rivaldo (yellow card) 41'; Chico (yellow card) 44'; M. Assunção (yellow card) 45'; João Vitor (red card) 78'	Report	23' Davi; (yellow card) 28' Jonas; (yellow card) 48' Émerson; (yellow card) 52' Eltinho; 56' Leonardo; (yellow card) 68' Léo Gago	Stadium: Arena Barueri; Attendance: 7,513; Referee: Alício Pena Júnior (Minas Gerais)

13 November 2011 34	Grêmio	2–2	Palmeiras	Porto Alegre
16:00 UTC−03:00	Rochemback (yellow card) 58'; Fernando (yellow card) 63', (goal) 90'; Brandão 68'; Leandro (yellow card) 81'; Júlio César (yellow card) 85'	Report	25' Cicinho; (yellow card) 30' Gerley; (yellow card) 35' Luan; 59' M. Assunção; (yellow card) 75' Márcio Araújo; (yellow card) 76' Ricardo Bueno	Stadium: Estádio Olímpico Monumental; Attendance: 15,062; Referee: Edivaldo Elias da Silva (Paraná)

16 November 2011 35	Palmeiras	1–1	Vasco	São Paulo
20:50 UTC−03:00	Thiago Heleno (yellow card) 41'; Luan 62'; Pedro Carmona (yellow card) 80'	Report	3', (yellow card) 74' Dedé; (yellow card) 14' Renato Silva	Stadium: Estádio Municipal Paulo Machado de Carvalho (Pacaembu); Attendance: 8,153; Referee: Leandro Pedro Vuaden (Rio Grande do Sul)

20 November 2011 36	Bahia	0–2	Palmeiras	Salvador
18:00 UTC−03:00	Fahel (yellow card) 74'	Report	20' Ricardo Bueno; (yellow card) 65' João Vitor; 90' M. Assunção	Stadium: Estádio Metropolitano Roberto Santos (Pituaçu); Referee: Cláudio Francisco Lima e Silva (Sergipe)

27 November 2011 37	Palmeiras	1–0	São Paulo	São Paulo
16:00 UTC−03:00	Ricardo Bueno (yellow card) 24'; M. Assunção (yellow card) 36', (goal) 55'; Gerley (yellow card) 90+1'	Report	(yellow card) 16' João Filipe; (yellow card) 31' Denílson; (yellow card) 41' Wellington; (yellow card) 74' Luís Fabiano; (red card) 90+1' Rivaldo	Stadium: Estádio Municipal Paulo Machado de Carvalho (Pacaembu); Attendance: 18,364; Referee: Luiz Flávio de Oliveira (São Paulo)

4 December 2011 38	Corinthians	0–0	Palmeiras	São Paulo
16:00 UTC−03:00	Alex (yellow card) 26'; Jorge Henrique (yellow card) 54'; Alessandro (yellow card) 70'; Wallace (red card) 73'; Liédson (yellow card) 74'; Chicão (yellow card) 79'; Leandro Castán (red card) 90'	Report	(yellow card) 5' Patrik; (yellow card) 38' Leandro Amaro; (red card) 47' Valdivia; (yellow card) 78' (red card) 90' João Vitor	Stadium: Estádio Municipal Paulo Machado de Carvalho (Pacaembu); Attendance: 39,928; Referee: Wilson Luiz Seneme (São Paulo)

Last updated: 5 December 2011.
Source: S.E. Palmeiras

Pos	Team	Pld	W	D	L	GF	GA	GD	Pts	Qualification or relegation
9	Botafogo	38	16	8	14	52	49	+3	56	2012 Copa Sudamericana Second Stage
10	Santos	38	15	8	15	55	55	0	53	2012 Copa Libertadores Second Stage (Note: Santos is qualified for the second stage of the 2012 Copa Libertadores as the 2011 Copa Libertadores champion.)
11	Palmeiras	38	11	17	10	43	39	+4	50	2012 Copa Sudamericana Second Stage
12	Grêmio	38	13	9	16	49	57	−8	48	2012 Copa Sudamericana Second Stage
13	Atlético Goianiense	38	12	12	14	50	45	+5	48	2012 Copa Sudamericana Second Stage

Updated to match(es) played on December 4, 2011. Source:
Rules for classification: 1st points; 2nd wins; 3rd goal difference; 4th goals scored; 5th head-to-head results; 6th least red cards received; 7th least yellow cards received; 8th draw

=== Copa Sul-Americana ===
On 28 June, the matches of the 2011 Copa Sul-Americana were defined in Buenos Aires, Argentina. All the Brazilian clubs participating in the competition will enter in the Second Phase and will play against another Brazilian. Palmeiras will play Vasco da Gama in a two-leg encounter.

Second phase

11 August 2011 1st leg	Vasco (Brazil)	2–0	(Brazil) Palmeiras	Rio de Janeiro
21:45 UTC−03:00	Diego Souza 42'; Elton 79'	Report	(yellow card) 22' Henrique; (yellow card) 47' Thiago Heleno	Stadium: Estádio Club de Regatas Vasco da Gama (São Januário); Attendance: 1,707; Referee: Leandro Vuaden (Brazil)

25 August 2011 2nd leg	Palmeiras (Brazil)	3–1 (3–3(a) agg.)	(Brazil) Vasco	São Paulo
20:30 UTC−03:00	Luan 12'; Gabriel Silva (yellow card) 31'; Maikon Leite (yellow card) 48'; Kleber 53'; Chico (yellow card) 71'; M. Assunção 92+2'	Report	57' Jumar; (yellow card) 61' Allan; (yellow card) 63' Renato Silva	Stadium: Estádio Municipal Paulo Machado de Carvalho (Pacaembu); Attendance: 9,993; Referee: Héber Roberto Lopes (Brazil)

=== Overall statistics ===
Games played	69 (21 Campeonato Paulista, 7 Copa do Brasil, 2 Copa Sul-Americana, 38 Campeonato Brasileiro, 1 Friendly)
Games won	31 (13 Campeonato Paulista, 6 Copa do Brasil, 1 Copa Sul-Americana, 11 Campeonato Brasileiro)
Games drawn	23 (5 Campeonato Paulista, 0 Copa do Brasil, 0 Copa Sul-Americana, 17 Campeonato Brasileiro, 1 Friendly)
Games lost	15 (3 Campeonato Paulista, 1 Copa do Brasil, 1 Copa Sul-Americana, 10 Campeonato Brasileiro)
Goals scored	95
Goals conceded	63
Goal difference	+32
Average GF per game	1.37
Average GA per game	0.91
Clean sheets	27
Best result	5 – 0 (H) vs. Avaí – Campeonato Brasileiro – 19 June 2011
Worst result	0 – 6 (A) vs. Coritiba – Copa do Brasil – 5 May 2011
Most Appearances	Márcio Araújo (63)
Yellow cards	160
Red cards	11
Average YC per game	2.31
Average RC per game	0.15
Top scorer	Kleber (17 goals)
Top assistor	Marcos Assunção (17)
Most clean sheets	Deola (17)
Worst discipline	Thiago Heleno (16 (yellow card) , 2 (red card) )

Source: Palmeiras.com

Updated 4 December 2011

== Players ==
=== Squad information ===
Note: Flags indicate national team as defined under FIFA eligibility rules; some limited exceptions apply. Players may hold more than one non-FIFA nationality.

No.	Pos.	Nation	Player
2	DF	BRA	Cicinho
3	DF	BRA	Henrique
4	DF	BRA	Thiago Heleno
7	FW	BRA	Maikon Leite
8	MF	BRA	Márcio Araújo
9	FW	BRA	Ricardo Bueno
10	MF	CHI	Jorge Valdivia (2nd vice-captain)
11	FW	BRA	Luan
12	GK	BRA	Marcos (captain)
13	DF	BRA	Rivaldo
14	DF	BRA	Paulo Henrique
15	DF	BRA	Maurício Ramos
16	MF	BRA	João Vitor

No.	Pos.	Nation	Player
17	MF	BRA	Tinga
18	DF	BRA	Gerley
19	FW	BRA	Fernandão
20	MF	BRA	Marcos Assunção (vice-captain)
21	MF	BRA	Pedro Carmona
22	GK	BRA	Deola
23	MF	BRA	Chico
25	FW	BRA	Vinícius
29	FW	BRA	Dinei
36	DF	BRA	Leandro Amaro
40	MF	BRA	Patrik
46	GK	BRA	Raphael
47	GK	BRA	Fábio Szymonek

Updated as of 16 November 2011

=== Sul-Americana squad ===
CONMEBOL allows each team to choose only 25 players from their squad to compete in the Sudamericana, with numberings from 1 to 25. Some of the players are registered with their own squad number and others had to choose another one from the 25.

Note: Flags indicate national team as defined under FIFA eligibility rules; some limited exceptions apply. Players may hold more than one non-FIFA nationality.

No.	Pos.	Nation	Player
1	GK	BRA	Raphael
2	DF	BRA	Cicinho
3	DF	BRA	Henrique
4	DF	BRA	Thiago Heleno
5	MF	BRA	Pierre
6	DF	BRA	Gabriel Silva
7	FW	BRA	Maikon Leite
8	MF	BRA	Márcio Araújo
9	FW	BRA	Vinícius
10	MF	CHI	Jorge Valdivia
11	FW	BRA	Luan
12	GK	BRA	Marcos
13	DF	BRA	Rivaldo

No.	Pos.	Nation	Player
14	DF	BRA	Paulo Henrique
15	DF	BRA	Maurício Ramos
16	MF	BRA	João Vitor
17	MF	BRA	Tinga
18	DF	BRA	Gerley
19	FW	BRA	Dinei
20	MF	BRA	Marcos Assunção
21	FW	BRA	Leandro Amaro
22	GK	BRA	Deola
23	MF	BRA	Chico
24	FW	BRA	Patrik
25	FW	BRA	Kleber

Updated as of 17 August 2011

=== Squad statistics ===
As of 5 December 2011

No.	Pos	Nat	Player	Total		Brasileiro		Paulista		Copa do Brasil		Sul-Americana	
No.	Pos	Nat	Player	Apps	Goals	Apps	Goals	Apps	Goals	Apps	Goals	Apps	Goals
1	GK	(Brazil) BRA	Bruno	2	0	0+0	0	1+0	0	1+0	0	0+0	0
2	DF	(Brazil) BRA	Cicinho	54	2	29+0	1	18+0	1	4+1	0	2+0	0
3	DF	(Brazil) BRA	Henrique	23	3	20+1	3	0+0	0	0+0	0	2+0	0
4	DF	(Brazil) BRA	Thiago Heleno	50	3	27+2	0	14+0	3	5+0	0	2+0	0
5	MF	(Brazil) BRA	Pierre	2	0	0+2	0	0+0	0	0+0	0	0+0	0
6	DF	(Brazil) BRA	Gabriel Silva	29	1	19+0	0	6+0	0	3+0	1	1+0	0
7	FW	(Brazil) BRA	Maikon Leite	23	3	13+8	3	0+0	0	0+0	0	2+0	0
8	MF	(Brazil) BRA	Márcio Araújo	63	1	34+1	0	20+0	1	7+0	0	1+0	0
9	FW	(Brazil) BRA	Wellington Paulista	10	0	5+1	0	0+0	0	1+3	0	0+0	0
9	FW	(Brazil) BRA	Ricardo Bueno	15	2	8+7	2	0+0	0	0+0	0	0+0	0
10	MF	(Chile) CHI	Jorge Valdivia	28	4	15+0	2	6+1	2	5+0	0	1+0	0
11	FW	(Brazil) BRA	Luan	60	12	33+1	9	15+4	0	4+1	2	2+0	1
12	GK	(Brazil) BRA	Marcos	26	0	19+0	0	3+0	0	2+0	0	2+0	0
13	DF	(Brazil) BRA	Rivaldo	30	0	8+3	0	15+0	0	4+0	0	0+0	0
14	DF	(Brazil) BRA	Vítor	5	0	0+0	0	1+4	0	0+0	0	0+0	0
14	DF	(Brazil) BRA	Paulo Henrique	2	0	1+1	0	0+0	0	0+0	0	0+0	0
15	DF	(Brazil) BRA	Maurício Ramos	28	3	17+0	3	8+1	0	1+0	0	0+1	0
16	MF	(Brazil) BRA	João Vitor	39	1	5+14	0	5+9	1	3+3	0	0+0	0
17	MF	(Brazil) BRA	Tinga	42	1	9+9	0	16+3	1	3+2	0	0+0	0
18	FW	(Brazil) BRA	Max Santos	6	1	0+0	0	1+5	1	0+0	0	0+0	0
18	DF	(Brazil) BRA	Gerley	14	0	11+2	0	0+0	0	0+0	0	1+0	0
19	FW	(Brazil) BRA	Adriano	24	6	3+3	0	10+4	1	3+1	5	0+0	0
19	FW	(Brazil) BRA	Fernandão	18	2	11+7	2	0+0	0	0+0	0	0+0	0
20	MF	(Brazil) BRA	Marcos Assunção	59	11	34+0	8	17+0	1	6+0	1	2+0	1
21	MF	(Brazil) BRA	Pedro Carmona	3	0	1+2	0	0+0	0	0+0	0	0+0	0
22	GK	(Brazil) BRA	Deola	40	0	19+0	0	17+0	0	4+0	0	0+0	0
23	DF	(Brazil) BRA	Danilo	26	2	4+0	0	15+0	1	7+0	1	0+0	0
23	MF	(Brazil) BRA	Chico	44	2	16+12	2	2+7	0	2+4	0	1+0	0
25	FW	(Brazil) BRA	Vinícius	15	1	2+5	0	1+4	1	0+1	0	0+2	0
29	FW	(Brazil) BRA	Dinei	21	1	4+9	0	6+1	1	0+0	0	0+1	0
30	FW	(Brazil) BRA	Kleber	44	17	19+0	3	16+0	8	7+0	5	2+0	1
31	FW	(Brazil) BRA	Miguel	2	0	0+0	0	1+1	0	0+0	0	0+0	0
32	DF	(Brazil) BRA	Luís Felipe	1	0	0+0	0	0+1	0	0+0	0	0+0	0
33	DF	(Brazil) BRA	Gualberto	0	0	0+0	0	0+0	0	0+0	0	0+0	0
36	DF	(Brazil) BRA	Leandro Amaro	20	1	9+2	0	4+3	1	1+1	0	0+0	0
38	MF	(Brazil) BRA	Bruno Turco	1	0	0+0	0	0+1	0	0+0	0	0+0	0
40	MF	(Brazil) BRA	Patrik	49	8	18+9	2	7+8	6	3+2	0	1+1	0
46	GK	(Brazil) BRA	Raphael	0	0	0+0	0	0+0	0	0+0	0	0+0	0
47	GK	(Brazil) BRA	Fábio Szymonek	0	0	0+0	0	0+0	0	0+0	0	0+0	0
99	MF	(Brazil) BRA	Lincoln	14	0	4+2	0	5+1	0	2+0	0	0+0	0

NOTE: Starting appearance + Substitute appearance
Players in italics have left the club during the season
Luan, now nº 11, was nº 21 until 27 August
Chico, now nº 23 (previously Danilo), was nº 3 until the arrival of Henrique
Ricardo Bueno the nº 9, Paulo Henrique the nº 14, Gerley the nº 18 and Fernandão the nº 19, all arrived when their squad numbers were available and previously used by Wellington Paulista (nº 9), Vítor (nº 14), Max Santos (nº 18) and Adriano (nº 19) respectively

=== Starting 11 ===
No.	Pos.	Nation	Name	Starts	Note
22	GK	(Brazil)	Deola	40	Marcos has 26 starts
2	RB	(Brazil)	Cicinho	54	
4	RCB	(Brazil)	Thiago Heleno	48	Maurício Ramos has 26 starts
23	LCB	(Brazil)	Danilo	26	Henrique has 22 starts
6	LB	(Brazil)	Gabriel Silva	29	Rivaldo has 27 starts
8	RDM	(Brazil)	Márcio Araújo	62	
20	LDM	(Brazil)	Marcos Assunção	59	Chico has 21 starts
40	CAM	(Brazil)	Patrik	29	Valdivia has 27 starts
19	RW	(Brazil)	Adriano	16	Maikon Leite has 15 starts
11	LW	(Brazil)	Luan	54	
30	ST	(Brazil)	Kleber (c)	44	Fernandão has 11 starts

Last updated: 5 December 2011
Source: Squad stats and Start formations.
Only competitive matches.
Using the most used start formation.
Ordered by position on pitch (from back right to front left).

=== Transfers ===
==== In ====
Pos.	Name	From	Date
DF	(Brazil) Thiago Heleno	(Brazil) Corinthians	11 January 2011
MF	(Brazil) João Vitor	(Brazil) Grêmio Prudente	18 January 2011
FW	(Brazil) Max Santos	(Brazil) Vila Nova	24 January 2011
MF	(Brazil) Chico	(Brazil) Atlético Paranaense	26 January 2011
DF	(Brazil) Paulo Henrique	(Brazil) Paraná	19 May 2011
FW	(Brazil) Maikon Leite	(Brazil) Santos	24 June 2011
DF	(Brazil) Gerley	(Brazil) Caxias	20 July 2011
DF	(Brazil) Cicinho	(Brazil) Santo André	23 July 2011
FW	(Brazil) Luan	(France) Toulouse	2 August 2011
FW	(Brazil) Ricardo Bueno	(Brazil) Atlético Mineiro	25 August 2011
FW	(Brazil) Fernandão	(Brazil) Guarani	26 August 2011
MF	(Brazil) Pedro Carmona	(Brazil) São José	14 September 2011

==== Out ====
Pos.	Name	To	Date
FW	(Brazil) Lenny	(Brazil) Figueirense	3 January 2011
FW	(Brazil) Ewerthon	Released	6 January 2011
DF	(Brazil) Fabrício	(Brazil) Cruzeiro	6 January 2011
MF	(Brazil) Edinho	(Brazil) Fluminense	17 January 2011
DF	(Brazil) Danilo	(Italy) Udinese	18 June 2011
FW	(Brazil) Max Santos	(Brazil) Goiás	15 July 2011
DF	(Brazil) Gabriel Silva	(Italy) Udinese	7 November 2011
FW	(Brazil) Kleber	(Brazil) Grêmio	16 November 2011

==== Loaned in ====
Pos.	Name	From	Date	End of loan
FW	(Brazil) Luan	(France) Toulouse	4 August 2010 (last season)	31 July 2011
FW	(Brazil) Dinei	(Brazil) Atlético Paranaense	17 August 2010 (last season)	31 December 2011
DF	(Brazil) Cicinho	(Brazil) Santo André	13 January 2011	23 July 2011
FW	(Brazil) Adriano	(Brazil) Fluminense	17 January 2011	7 July 2011
FW	(Brazil) Wellington Paulista	(Brazil) Cruzeiro	5 April 2011	1 August 2011
DF	(Brazil) Henrique	(Spain) Barcelona	15 July 2011	30 June 2012

==== Loaned out ====
Pos.	Name	To	Date	End of loan
FW	(Brazil) Daniel Lovinho	(Brazil) América Mineiro	14 January 2011	23 September 2011
MF	(Brazil) Souza	(Brazil) São Caetano	14 January 2011	30 November 2011
FW	(Brazil) Bruno Oliveira	(Brazil) Oeste	14 January 2011	31 December 2011
FW	(Brazil) Julio César	(Brazil) Oeste	14 January 2011	31 December 2011
FW	(Brazil) Tadeu	(Brazil) Sport	18 February 2011	31 December 2011
FW	(Brazil) Vítor	(Brazil) Sport	18 February 2011	30 April 2011
DF	(Brazil) Vítor	(Brazil) Cruzeiro	1 May 2011	31 December 2011
GK	(Brazil) Bruno	(Brazil) Portuguesa	10 June 2011	31 December 2011
MF	(Brazil) Lincoln	(Brazil) Avaí	10 August 2011	31 December 2011
MF	(Brazil) Pierre	(Brazil) Atlético Mineiro	18 August 2011	31 December 2011
FW	(Brazil) Daniel Lovinho	(Brazil) Ipatinga	24 September 2011	31 December 2011

=== Scorers ===
Place	Nation	Position	Number	Name	Brasileiro	Paulista	Copa do Brasil	Sul-Americana	Friendly	Total
1	(Brazil)	FW	30	Kleber	3	8	5	1	0	17
2	(Brazil)	FW	11	Luan	9	0	2	1	1	13
3	(Brazil)	MF	20	Marcos Assunção	8	1	1	1	0	11
4	(Brazil)	MF	40	Patrik	2	6	0	0	0	8
5	(Brazil)	FW	19	Adriano	0	1	5	0	0	6
6	(Chile)	MF	10	Jorge Valdivia	2	2	0	0	0	4
7	(Brazil)	DF	3	Henrique	3	0	0	0	0	3
7	(Brazil)	FW	7	Maikon Leite	3	0	0	0	0	3
7	(Brazil)	DF	15	Maurício Ramos	3	0	0	0	0	3
7	(Brazil)	DF	4	Thiago Heleno	0	3	0	0	0	3
8	(Brazil)	MF	23	Chico	2	0	0	0	0	2
8	(Brazil)	DF	2	Cicinho	1	1	0	0	0	2
8	(Brazil)	DF	23	Danilo	0	1	1	0	0	2
8	(Brazil)	FW	29	Dinei	0	1	0	0	1	2
8	(Brazil)	FW	19	Fernandão	2	0	0	0	0	2
8	(Brazil)	FW	9	Ricardo Bueno	2	0	0	0	0	2
9	(Brazil)	DF	6	Gabriel Silva	0	0	1	0	0	1
9	(Brazil)	MF	16	João Vitor	0	1	0	0	0	1
9	(Brazil)	DF	36	Leandro Amaro	0	1	0	0	0	1
9	(Brazil)	FW	18	Max Santos	0	1	0	0	0	1
9	(Brazil)	MF	8	Márcio Araújo	0	1	0	0	0	1
9	(Brazil)	MF	17	Tinga	0	1	0	0	0	1
9	(Brazil)	FW	25	Vinícius	0	1	0	0	0	1
/	/	/	/	Own goals	3	1	1	0	0	5
			TOTAL	43	31	16	3	2	95	

=== Disciplinary record ===
Number	Nation	Position	Name	Brasileiro		Paulista		Copa do Brasil		Sul-Americana		Total	
Number	Nation	Position	Name	Booked	Sent off (straight red)	Booked	Sent off (straight red)	Booked	Sent off (straight red)	Booked	Sent off (straight red)	Booked	Sent off (straight red)
4	(Brazil)	DF	Thiago Heleno	11	1	1	1	3	0	1	0	16	2
13	(Brazil)	DF	Rivaldo	5	1	4	0	1	1	0	0	10	2
11	(Brazil)	FW	Luan	10	0	3	0	2	0	0	0	15	0
10	(Chile)	MF	Jorge Valdivia	7	2	0	0	2	0	0	0	9	2
30	(Brazil)	FW	Kleber	7	0	5	0	1	0	0	0	13	0
16	(Brazil)	MF	João Vitor	6	2	1	0	1	0	0	0	8	2
20	(Brazil)	MF	Marcos Assunção	8	0	3	0	1	0	0	0	12	0
2	(Brazil)	DF	Cicinho	7	0	1	0	1	0	0	0	9	0
40	(Brazil)	MF	Patrik	5	0	4	0	0	0	0	0	9	0
23	(Brazil)	DF	Danilo	1	0	5	1	0	0	0	0	6	1
23	(Brazil)	MF	Chico	6	0	1	0	0	0	1	0	8	0
6	(Brazil)	DF	Gabriel Silva	3	0	3	0	0	0	1	0	7	0
18	(Brazil)	DF	Gerley	5	1	0	0	0	0	0	0	5	1
15	(Brazil)	DF	Maurício Ramos	3	1	0	0	1	0	0	0	4	1
8	(Brazil)	MF	Márcio Araújo	5	0	1	0	0	0	0	0	6	0
17	(Brazil)	MF	Tinga	2	0	2	0	0	0	0	0	4	0
3	(Brazil)	DF	Henrique	2	0	0	0	0	0	1	0	3	0
7	(Brazil)	FW	Maikon Leite	2	0	0	0	0	0	1	0	3	0
9	(Brazil)	FW	Wellington Paulista	2	0	0	0	0	0	0	0	2	0
29	(Brazil)	FW	Dinei	1	0	1	0	0	0	0	0	2	0
21	(Brazil)	MF	Pedro Carmona	2	0	0	0	0	0	0	0	2	0
9	(Brazil)	FW	Ricardo Bueno	2	0	0	0	0	0	0	0	2	0
19	(Brazil)	FW	Fernandão	1	0	0	0	0	0	0	0	1	0
36	(Brazil)	DF	Leandro Amaro	1	0	0	0	0	0	0	0	1	0
12	(Brazil)	GK	Marcos	1	0	0	0	0	0	0	0	1	0
22	(Brazil)	GK	Deola	0	0	1	0	0	0	0	0	1	0
			TOTAL	106	8	36	2	13	1	5	0	160	11

=== Clean sheets ===
Place	Nation	Position	Name	Campeonato Brasileiro	Campeonato Paulista	Copa do Brasil	Copa Sul-Americana	Friendly	Total
1	(Brazil)	GK	Deola	5	10	2	0	0	17
2	(Brazil)	GK	Marcos	7	1	1	0	0	9
3	(Brazil)	GK	Bruno	0	1	0	0	0	1
			TOTAL	12	12	3	0	0	27

== Club ==
=== Kit ===
30 May 2010 – 31 May 2011

Supplier: Adidas
Sponsor(s): Fiat

Home	Away	Third

Last updated: 1 June 2010.
Source: S.E. Palmeiras Online Store

1 June 2011 – 21 August 2011

Supplier: Adidas
Sponsor(s): Fiat

Home	Away	Third

Last updated: 1 June 2011.
Source: S.E. Palmeiras Online Store

22 August 2011 – present

Supplier: Adidas
Sponsor(s): Fiat

Home	Away	Third

Last updated: 22 August 2011.
Source: S.E. Palmeiras Online Store

=== Coaching staff ===
Position	Staff
Manager	(Brazil) Luiz Felipe Scolari
Assistant managers	(Brazil) Flávio Murtosa
Assistant managers	(Brazil) Valdir Moraes
First team fitness coach	(Brazil) Anselmo Sbragia
First team fitness coach	(Brazil) Darlan Schneider
Goalkeeping coach	(Brazil) Fernando Miranda
Goalkeeping coach	(Brazil) Carlos Pracidelli
Head scout	(Brazil) Marcos Aurélio Galeano
Club doctors	(Brazil) Dr. Rubens Sampaio
Club doctors	(Brazil) Dr. Vinicius Martins
Club doctors	(Brazil) Dr. Otávio Vilhena
Reserve team manager	(Brazil) Jorge Parraga
Physiologist	(Brazil) Paulo Zogaib
Physiotherapists	(Brazil) José Rosan
Physiotherapists	(Brazil) João Carlos Ferreira
Nutritionist	(Brazil) Alessandra Favano

Last updated: 5 January 2011.
Source: SE Palmeiras (in Portuguese)

=== Other information ===
Chairman	(Brazil) Arnaldo Tirone
Vice President	(Brazil) Roberto Frizzo
Managing Director	(Brazil) João Gavioli
Financial Director	(Brazil) Jorge Vacarini
Football Director	(Brazil) César Sampaio
Ground (capacity and dimensions)	Estádio Municipal Paulo Machado de Carvalho (Pacaembu) (37,952 / 104x70 meters)

Updated to match played 14 November 2011
Source: SE Palmeiras (in Portuguese)
