= 2010 SE Palmeiras season =

Palmeiras
2010 season
- Chairman: Luiz Gonzaga Belluzzo
- Manager: Luiz Felipe Scolari
- Série A: 10th
- Campeonato Paulista: 11th
- Copa do Brasil: Quarterfinals
- Copa Sudmericana: Semifinals
- Top goalscorer: League: Kleber (8 Goals); All: Robert (14 goals)
- Highest home attendance: 35,054 (vs. Atlético Mineiro)
- Lowest home attendance: 3,224 (vs. Sertãozinho)
- Average home league attendance: 11,082
Home colours	Away colours	Third colours

The 2010 season was the 96th season in Palmeiras's existence, and their 95th in Brazil's first division. Palmeiras also played the usual Campeonato Paulista, the Copa do Brasil and the Copa Sudamericana.

Palmeiras started the campaign under management of Muricy Ramalho, who was dismissed on 18 February 2010 after some bad results. Manager Antônio Carlos Zago took over Palmeiras at the same day.

On 18 May 2010, at exactly 3 months as the club's manager, Antônio Carlos Zago was dismissed after a discussion with Palmeiras's Direction office. After a small period without a permanent manager, Palmeiras squad was coached by interim Jorge Parraga.

On 13 June 2010, during the season's 1-month break for the World Cup in South Africa, Luiz Felipe Scolari agreed to manage the team, where he had previously worked between 1997 and 2000. The manager won important titles with the team, such as Copa do Brasil and Copa Mercosur in 1998, the Copa Libertadores in 1999 and the Torneio Rio – São Paulo in 2000.

== Season ==
=== Friendlies ===
Palmeiras played a friendly match against Boca Juniors from Argentina, marking the club's last match in Palestra Itália. Palmeiras lost the match by 0–2.

Date	Opponent	H / A	Result F – A	Scorers	Venue	Attendance
9 July 2010	Boca Juniors	H	0 – 2		Palestra Itália	17,786

=== Campeonato Paulista ===
Palmeiras started the campaign in the Campeonato Paulista 2010 under Manager Muricy Ramalho, who in the beginning of the tournament had some bad results with the team. Antônio Carlos Zago took over Palmeiras in February, and in his first match with the team, he defeated rival São Paulo by 2–0 in the Choque-Rei. Antônio Carlos managed Palmeiras with high-class wins against rivals, however Palmeiras didn't play well along the Championship and preferred to give more focus in the Copa do Brasil. After a bad campaign, on 7 April, Palmeiras finished the competition in 11th place with 25 points.

Date	Opponent	H / A	Result F – A	Scorers	Attendance
16 January 2010	Mogi Mirim	H	5 – 1	Diego Souza 34', 42', Léo 51', Robert 64', Cleiton Xavier 75'	20,392
21 January 2010	Prudente (Barueri)	A	2 – 2	Deyvid Sacconi 28', Diego Souza 79'	35,528
24 January 2010	Ituano	H	3 – 3	Diego Souza 20', Robert 48', Deyvid Sacconi 62'	18,079
27 January 2010	Monte Azul	A	1 – 0	Cleiton Xavier 34' (pen.)	14,693
31 January 2010	Corinthians	A	0 – 1		40,257
4 February 2010	Portuguesa	H	1 – 1	Danilo 69'	23,872
7 February 2010	Bragantino	A	3 – 2	Cleiton Xavier 16', Robert 37', Lenny 89'	19,598
13 February 2010	Botafogo-SP	A	1 – 1	Léo 71'	28,114
17 February 2010	São Caetano	H	1 – 4	Diego Souza 64'	15,219
21 February 2010	São Paulo	H	2 – 0	Robert 54', 70'	13,590
28 February 2010	Rio Claro	A	0 – 1		5,892
3 March 2010	Santo André	H	1 – 3	Robert 43'	3,840
8 March 2010	Sertãozinho	H	3 – 2	Lenny 23', Cleiton Xavier 38', 48'	3,224
14 March 2010	Santos	A	4 – 3	Robert 41', 43', 88', Diego Souza 57'	18,619
20 March 2010	Ponte Preta	H	0 – 2		17,255
24 March 2010	Rio Branco	A	2 – 2	Diego Souza 17', Ewerthon 34'	6,477
27 March 2010	Mirassol	H	1 – 1	Robert 5' (pen.)	3,764
3 April 2010	Oeste	H	0 – 0		3,603
7 April 2010	Paulista	A	1 – 3	Lincoln 54' (pen.)	5,792

Pos	Club	Pld	W	D	L	GF	GA	GD	Pts
1	Santos	19	15	2	2	61	24	+37	47
2	Santo André	19	11	4	4	45	27	+18	37
3	Grêmio Prudente	19	11	4	4	34	28	+6	37
4	São Paulo	19	11	3	5	41	19	+22	36
5	Corinthians	19	10	5	4	32	18	+14	35
-	...	...	...	...	...	...	...	...	...
10	Ponte Preta	19	7	4	8	25	30	-5	25
11	Palmeiras	19	6	7	6	31	32	-1	25
12	Mogi Mirim	19	7	3	9	22	35	-13	24

Pld = Matches played; W = Matches won; D = Matches drawn; L = Matches lost; GF = Goals for; GA = Goals against; GD = Goal difference; Pts = Points

=== Copa do Brasil ===
In the beginning of the year, Palmeiras appointed the Copa do Brasil as the club's primary objective of the season. Palmeiras begun the campaign in the Copa do Brasil 2010 playing against Flamengo-PI, winning comfortably in the aggregated score. In the 2nd Round, Palmeiras faced Paysandu and won both matches easily, qualifying to play against Atlético Paranaense in the Round of 16. Palmeiras won the first match by 1–0 at Palestra Itália and in the second match, drew by 1-1, winning by 2–1 in the aggregated score. In the Quarter-Finals, Palmeiras faced champions from Goiás, Atlético Goianiense and won the first match in the final minutes, from Cleiton Xavier's 94-minute penalty. A week later, Palmeiras lost by 1–0 to Atletico Goianiense in Serra Dourada, sending the decision to penalties. Although the goalkeeper, Marcos, saved three penalty kicks, Palmeiras players missed four shots and was eliminated by Atletico Goianiense by 2–1 in the penalty kicks. The elimination was a serious disappointment to Palmeiras, that tried hard to win the title and qualify to Copa Libertadores in 2011.

Date	Round	Opponent	H / A	Result F – A	Scorers	Venue	Attendance
10 February 2010	Round 1	Flamengo-PI	A	1 – 0	Diego Souza 69'	Albertão	36,637
25 February 2010	Round 1	Flamengo-PI	H	4 – 0	Robert 2' (pen.), 35', Léo 26', Edinho 74'	Palestra Itália	8,532
17 March 2010	Round 2	Paysandu	A	2 – 1	Lincoln 14', Ewerthon 49'	Mangueirão	28,009
31 March 2010	Round 2	Paysandu	H	1 – 0	Robert 60'	Palestra Itália	7,406
15 April 2010	Round of 16	Atlético-PR	H	1 – 0	Robert 14'	Palestra Itália	20,269
21 April 2010	Round of 16	Atlético-PR	A	1 – 1	Lincoln 89'	Arena da Baixada	25,839
29 April 2010	Quarter-Finals	Atlético-GO	H	1 – 0	Cleiton Xavier 90+3' (pen.)	Palestra Itália	23,892
5 May 2010	Quarter-Finals	Atlético-GO	A	0 – 1 (1-2 p.s.o.)		Serra Dourada	38,729

=== Campeonato Brasileiro ===
Palmeiras started the campaign in the 2010 Campeonato Brasileiro Série A playing against Vitória at home, achieving a 1–0 victory at the final minutes. In the 2nd Round, Palmeiras faced Vasco da Gama away and got a single point by a draw, in a very bad fixture by both clubs. After the draw, Palmeiras manager Antônio Carlos Zago and striker Robert, discussed with each other and both of them were dismissed by the club's direction.

The following week, the fixture was against Grêmio for the 3rd Round of the competition. Palmeiras won it easily by the score of 4–2 in a very active match by both sides. After the win Palmeiras secured the 4th position in the League table, the match will be remembered by Palmeiras as the last match played in the old home, Palestra Itália, as the stadium will be demolished for construction of the new Arena Palestra Itália. On 26 May, rival São Paulo was the next opponent for the 4th Round, the final score was of 0–1 to the Morumbi team in a very disputed game, with Palmeiras's striker, Ewerthon, losing a penalty at the 87th minute. The next match was against Grêmio Prudente at the club's former stadium, the Arena Barueri, but this time the ground was used to serve as a home match for Palmeiras, although the game wasn't bad, the final score was 0-0.

On 2 June, Palmeiras faced Flamengo playing at home again and the venue was the São Paulo municipal stadium, the Pacaembu, due to the construction of the Arena. The match was dominated by Palmeiras, but unfortunately the team failed to score again, hitting the opponents crossbar three times and conceding a goal two minutes before the end of the match, the goal was scored by Vágner Love, the club's former player. The following round saw Palmeiras face Internacional away from home and Palmeiras managed to score with Lincoln in the beginning of the first half, after that Inter equalized and the game finished 1–1.

This was the last match of the Série A before the FIFA World Cup, stopping the league in the seventh round and Palmeiras in the mid-table position. During the pause for the World Cup, Jorge Parraga, the team's interim manager was replaced by Luiz Felipe Scolari, who previously managed Palmeiras from 1997 to 2000, winning the Copa do Brasil and the Libertadores. Scolari agreed to manage the team even with proposal from other four Brazilian clubs.

The league continued on 15 July and Palmeiras faced State rivals, Santos FC, in the eighth round with some new players in the squad, such as the forwards Tadeu and Kléber, a club's former player and idol, and the midfielder Tinga who scored the winner in the second half. The match finished 2–1 for Palmeiras. Avaí was the next opponent, the match saw Palmeiras equalize with the home team at 2–2 in the beginning of the second half with Kléber, but Avaí scored two late goals to win a pretty two-sided match. In the league's 10th round, Palmeiras played against Botafogo and was winning the match until the middle of the second half by 2–0, when Marcos Assunção committed a tough foul and was dismissed, after the dismissal the club from Rio de Janeiro reacted and equalized in the final minutes. The following week, Palmeiras faced Ceará the league's 2nd placed, away from home, the match was good but the ball didn't cross the line in any of the both halves, the final result wasn't bad for Palmeiras, that stopped in the 10th place of the Série A.

After the end of the round, Palmeiras signed former Chilean idol, Jorge Valdivia, for 5 years from the Arabian side Al Ain. The signing of Valdivia left the club and especially the fans really glad. In the beginning of the 12th round, Palmeiras faced old rivals Corinthians, in the so-called Paulista Derby, and drew at home by 1–1. Although the bad result, Palmeiras attacked Corinthians almost every time in the match. Jorge Henrique scored for Corinthians at the 11th minute and Edinho equalized for Palmeiras at the 33rd minute, after that, Palmeiras scored three times, with Ewerthon twice and with Lincoln, but the referee pointed off-side in all of them.

For the League's 13th Round, Palmeiras drew with Goiás away from home by the score of 1–1. Ewerthon opened the score after just 12 minutes from the beginning with a long range shot. Palmeiras played extremely well during the first half, but in the second half, the team didn't make a good appearance, trying to hold a 1–0 lead until the end, when a dubious foul was committed by Palmeiras defence, and after the kick, Goiás drew with a header from Amaral. The result was disappointing for the team who was almost certain to win 3 points in the league. Despite the bad result, the team continued 11th in the table awaiting the return of some important players to the squad. In the following round, Palmeiras won the match against Atlético-PR by 2–0 in a very good appearance from all the players.

On 22 August, the team faced Guarani in Campinas. The match was marked by the return of Palmeiras Chilean idol, Jorge Valdivia, who came as a substitute in the second half, in the end both teams played well and the score ended 0–0. In the 16th round of the Série A, Palmeiras lost by a surprising 3–0 against the league's last placed team at home. The match was a terrifying display from the home players who could not stop Atlético-GO. After the game, manager Scolari stated that Palmeiras still needed to fix the squad for the following matches. On 29 August, after some hard training determination from the players, Palmeiras took on Atlético Mineiro in Ipatinga instead of Belo Horizonte, because of the reconstruction of the Mineirão stadium for the 2014 FIFA World Cup, and begun losing by 1–0 after an early second half goal by Neto Berola chipping the ball past goalkeeper Marcos, but equalised with Marcos Assunção minutes later. At the end Kléber turned the score for the away team, who deserved the 3 points after a well played match with many goal chances being created. Palmeiras reached the 9th position of the league table after the triumph.

After the victory over Atlético Mineiro, the clube saw colombian left wingback, Pablo Armero, leave to join Udinese from Italy.

At midweek, Palmeiras faced Fluminense in Rio de Janeiro, the League's 1st placed team. After conceding a goal from Emerson in the 15th minute and playing a reasonable first half, Palmeiras was better in the second half and managed to equalise with Ewerthon at the 93rd minute. Palmeiras lost its next match, played against Cruzeiro in Pacaembu, where the team started winning by 2–0 after a great first half, but suffered 3 dramatic goals in the second period, the last of them was scored from an irregular position in the 85th minute. On 8 September, Palmeiras drew with Vitória in Salvador, with substitute Tadeu scoring for the away team in the second half. The match was the first of the second part of the Série A, the 20th Round.

The 21st Round saw Palmeiras face Vasco da Gama at home. The match was equal for both sides with Palmeiras making most of the shots in the game. At the end it was a goalless draw. The next match was played against Grêmio in Porto Alegre, Palmeiras dominated the rival for most of the match and scored with Marcos Assunção, from a free kick, and with a header by Ewerthon after a cross from the scorer himself. Grêmio scored with Jonas in the stoppage time after a corner kick, but Palmeiras secured 3 points. After the win Palmeiras was awaited by the Choque-Rei derby with São Paulo on the next Sunday. The 1st half of the match was bad for both teams, but in the second half São Paulo scored from two counterattacks, in the first one the new boy, Lucas, made a wonderful finish past Deola and the second was a great assist from the boy to Fernandão make 2–0. Palmeiras was unlucky in the 2nd half, where the team almost scored 4 times.

Date	Opponent	H / A	Result F – A	Scorers	Venue	Attendance
8 May 2010	Vitória	H	1 – 0	Lincoln 78'	Palestra Itália	16,114
16 May 2010	Vasco	A	0 – 0		São Januário	11,236
22 May 2010	Grêmio	H	4 – 2	Ewerthon 16', 29', Maurício Ramos 61', Cleiton Xavier 70'	Palestra Itália	18,365
26 May 2010	São Paulo	A	0 – 1		Morumbi	15,522
29 May 2010	Prudente	H	0 – 0		Arena Barueri	7,093
2 June 2010	Flamengo	H	0 – 1		Pacaembu	8,457
6 June 2010	Internacional	A	1 – 1	Lincoln 14'	Beira-Rio	11,743
15 July 2010	Santos	H	2 – 1	Ewerthon 12', Tinga 66'	Pacaembu	20,109
18 July 2010	Avaí	A	2 – 4	Gabriel Silva 11', Kleber 54' (pen.)	Ressacada	10,482
22 July 2010	Botafogo	H	2 – 2	Marcos Assunção 46', Kleber 57'	Pacaembu	12,882
25 July 2010	Ceará	A	0 – 0		Castelão	19,212
1 August 2010	Corinthians	H	1 – 1	Edinho 33'	Pacaembu	24,491
8 August 2010	Goiás	A	1 – 1	Ewerthon 12'	Serra Dourada	13,168
14 August 2010	Atlético-PR	H	2 – 0	Danilo 3', Ewerthon 76'	Pacaembu	13,074
22 August 2010	Guarani	A	0 – 0		Brinco de Ouro	19,809
26 August 2010	Atlético-GO	H	0 – 3		Pacaembu	13,522
29 August 2010	Atlético Mineiro	A	2 – 1	Marcos Assunção 66', Kleber 76'	Ipatingão	11,120
1 September 2010	Fluminense	A	1 – 1	Ewerthon 90+3'	Maracanã	19,365
5 September 2010	Cruzeiro	H	2 – 3	Kleber 35' (pen.), Maurício Ramos 38'	Pacaembu	21,560
8 September 2010	Vitória	A	1 – 1	Tadeu 71'	Barradão	12,283
12 September 2010	Vasco	H	0 – 0		Pacaembu	16,976
15 September 2010	Grêmio	A	2 – 1	Marcos Assunção 14', Ewerthon 47'	Olímpico	21,204
19 September 2010	São Paulo	H	0 – 2		Pacaembu	18,109
22 September 2010	Prudente	A	1 – 0	Márcio Araújo 60'	Prudentão	13,920
25 September 2010	Flamengo	A	3 – 1	Kleber 19' (pen.), 31', Lincoln 89'	Engenhão	9,894
29 September 2010	Internacional	H	2 – 0	Marcos Assunção 31', 58'	Arena Barueri	12,264
2 October 2010	Santos	A	1 – 1	Kleber 20'	Vila Belmiro	8,900
7 October 2010	Avaí	H	4 – 1	Valdívia 11', 49', Kleber 58' (pen.), Gabriel Silva 70'	Pacaembu	6,306
10 October 2010	Botafogo	A	0 – 0		Engenhão	9,950
17 October 2010	Ceará	H	1 – 1	Marcos Assunção 45'	Arena Barueri	8,257
24 October 2010	Corinthians	A	0 – 1		Pacaembu	35,035
30 October 2010	Goiás	H	3 – 2	Tinga 21', Márcio Araújo 80', Dinei 86'	Arena Barueri	5,811
4 November 2010	Atlético-PR	A	0 – 1		Arena da Baixada	19,749
7 November 2010	Guarani	H	1 – 0	Leandro Amaro 41'	Arena Barueri	3,154
14 November 2010	Atlético-GO	A	0 – 3		Serra Dourada	10,283
21 November 2010	Atlético Mineiro	H	0 – 2		Fonte Luminosa	6,794
28 November 2010	Fluminense	H	1 – 2	Dinei 4'	Arena Barueri	11,291
5 December 2010	Cruzeiro	A	1 – 2	Rivaldo 53'	Arena do Jacaré	16,191

Pos	Club	Pld	W	D	L	GF	GA	GD	Pts
1	Fluminense	38	20	11	7	62	36	+26	71
2	Cruzeiro	38	20	9	9	53	38	+15	69
3	Corinthians	38	19	11	8	65	41	+24	68
4	Grêmio	38	17	12	9	68	43	+25	63
5	Atlético Paranaense	38	17	9	12	43	45	-2	60
-	...	...	...	...	...	...	...	...	...
9	São Paulo	38	15	10	13	54	54	0	55
10	Palmeiras	38	12	14	12	42	43	-1	50
11	Vasco da Gama	38	11	16	11	43	45	-2	49

Pld = Matches played; W = Matches won; D = Matches drawn; L = Matches lost; GF = Goals for; GA = Goals against; GD = Goal difference; Pts = Points

=== Copa Sul-Americana ===
After the performance in the 2009 Série A, when Palmeiras almost won the league and after some bad results in the end of the championship, finished in 5th qualifying only to the Copa Sudamericana and not to the major South American tournament, the Copa Libertadores, the team started the competition playing against Brazilian rivals, Vitória in Salvador. Palmeiras played well but couldn't stop Vitória from scoring two goals, one of them a good free-kick by Ramon, the club's captain, and the other in the stoppage time. The final result was not good, because the team had to win by a 3-goal margin to qualify to the Round of 16, or face the penalties if a 2-goal win happened to come. The 2nd leg in São Paulo, saw a marvelous 3–0 win with very good performances from the whole squad, mainly from Tadeu, who scored twice and Marcos Assunção who led the team to victory with an outstanding performance and a stunning 35-meter free-kick in the final minutes, securing qualification for the next round with a 3–2 aggregate win.

Date	Round	Opponent	H / A	Result F – A	Scorers	Venue	Attendance
11 August 2010	Round 2	Vitória	A	0 – 2		Barradão	8,527
19 August 2010	Round 2	Vitória	H	3 – 0	Tadeu 12', 45+2', Marcos Assunção 88'	Pacaembu	22,408
14 October 2010	Round of 16	Universitario Sucre	A	1 – 0	Marcos Assunção 26'	Olímpico Patria	11,729
20 October 2010	Round of 16	Universitario Sucre	H	3 – 1	Kleber 11', Luan 27', Danilo 69'	Arena Barueri	10,741
27 October 2010	Quarter-Finals	Atlético Mineiro	A	1 – 1	Kleber 54'	Arena do Jacaré	11,542
10 November 2010	Quarter-Finals	Atlético Mineiro	H	2 – 0	Marcos Assunção 26', Luan 78'	Pacaembu	35,054
17 November 2010	Semi-Finals	Goiás	A	1 – 0	Marcos Assunção 48'	Serra Dourada	14,129
24 November 2010	Semi-Finals	Goiás	H	1 – 2	Luan 33'	Pacaembu	34,926

=== Overall ===
Games played	73 (19 Campeonato Paulista, 8 Copa do Brasil, 8 Copa Sudamericana, 38 Campeonato Brasileiro)
Games won	29 (6 Campeonato Paulista, 6 Copa do Brasil, 5 Copa Sudamericana, 12 Campeonato Brasileiro)
Games drawn	23 (7 Campeonato Paulista, 1 Copa do Brasil, 1 Copa Sudamericana, 14 Campeonato Brasileiro)
Games lost	21 (6 Campeonato Paulista, 1 Copa do Brasil, 2 Copa Sudamericana, 12 Campeonato Brasileiro)
Goals scored	96
Goals conceded	82
Goal difference	+14
Best result	5 – 1 (H) vs. Mogi Mirim – Campeonato Paulista – 16 January 2010
Worst result	0 – 3 (H) vs. Atlético Goianiense – Série A – 26 August 2010
Most Appearances	Márcio Araújo (64 appearances)
Yellow cards	128
Red cards	10
Worst discipline	Pierre (16 (yellow card) , 2 (red card) )
Top scorer	Robert (14 goals)

Source: SE Palmeiras

Updated 5 December 2010

== Players ==
=== Squad information ===
Note: Flags indicate national team as defined under FIFA eligibility rules; some limited exceptions apply. Players may hold more than one non-FIFA nationality.

No.	Pos.	Nation	Player
1	GK	BRA	Bruno
3	MF	BRA	Edinho
4	DF	BRA	Fabrício
5	MF	BRA	Pierre
8	MF	BRA	Márcio Araújo
10	MF	CHI	Jorge Valdívia
11	MF	BRA	Rivaldo
12	GK	BRA	Marcos (captain)
14	DF	BRA	Vítor
15	DF	BRA	Maurício Ramos
17	MF	BRA	Tinga
18	MF	BRA	João Arthur
19	FW	BRA	Lenny
20	FW	BRA	Tadeu
21	FW	BRA	Luan
22	GK	BRA	Deola
23	DF	BRA	Danilo
25	FW	BRA	Vinícius

No.	Pos.	Nation	Player
26	MF	BRA	Jean
28	MF	BRA	Marcos Assunção
29	FW	BRA	Dinei
30	FW	BRA	Kleber (vice-captain)
32	DF	BRA	Luís Felipe
33	DF	BRA	Gualberto
34	DF	BRA	Gabriel Silva
35	MF	BRA	Anselmo
36	DF	BRA	Leandro Amaro
38	MF	BRA	Bruno Turco
40	FW	BRA	Patrik
45	GK	BRA	Carlos
46	GK	BRA	Raphael Alemão
56	FW	BRA	Paulo Henrique
77	FW	BRA	Bruno Oliveira
88	FW	BRA	Ewerthon
99	MF	BRA	Lincoln

=== Sul-Americana squad ===
Note: Flags indicate national team as defined under FIFA eligibility rules; some limited exceptions apply. Players may hold more than one non-FIFA nationality.

No.	Pos.	Nation	Player
1	GK	BRA	Bruno
2	DF	BRA	Vítor
3	MF	BRA	Edinho
4	DF	BRA	Fabrício
5	MF	BRA	Pierre
6	FW	BRA	Dinei
7	FW	BRA	Ewerthon
8	MF	BRA	Márcio Araújo
9	FW	BRA	Kleber (vice-captain)
10	DF	BRA	Gabriel Silva
11	MF	BRA	Lincoln
12	GK	BRA	Marcos (captain)
13	DF	BRA	Leandro Amaro

No.	Pos.	Nation	Player
14	MF	CHI	Jorge Valdívia
15	DF	BRA	Maurício Ramos
16	MF	BRA	Rivaldo
17	MF	BRA	Tinga
18	FW	BRA	Patrik
19	MF	BRA	Marcos Assunção
20	FW	BRA	Tadeu
21	FW	BRA	Luan
22	GK	BRA	Deola
23	DF	BRA	Danilo
24	GK	BRA	Raphael
25	FW	BRA	Vinícius

=== Squad statistics ===
No.	Pos.	Name	League		State Championship		Brazilian Cup		South America		Total		Discipline	
No.	Pos.	Name	Apps	Goals	Apps	Goals	Apps	Goals	Apps	Goals	Apps	Goals	Yellow card	Red card
1	GK	(Brazil) Bruno	4	0	1	0	0	0	0	0	5	0	0	0
3	DM	(Brazil) Edinho	30	1	14 (1)	0	8	1	7	0	59 (1)	2	18	0
4	CB	(Brazil) Fabrício	15 (1)	0	0	0	0	0	3 (1)	0	18 (2)	0	3	0
5	DM	(Brazil) Pierre	21 (6)	0	17	0	6 (1)	0	2 (4)	0	46 (11)	0	16	2
8	CM	(Brazil) Márcio Araújo	33	2	15 (1)	0	6 (1)	0	8	0	62 (2)	2	8	0
10	AM	(Chile) Jorge Valdívia	10 (5)	2	0	0	0	0	4	0	14 (5)	2	6	0
11	LM	(Brazil) Rivaldo	18 (2)	1	0	0	0	0	3	0	21 (2)	1	1	0
12	GK	(Brazil) Marcos (c)	13	0	17	0	6	0	1	0	37	0	1	0
13	DM	(Brazil) Fernando	2 (1)	0	0	0	0	0	0	0	2 (1)	0	0	0
14	RB	(Brazil) Vítor	26 (1)	0	0	0	0	0	1	0	27 (1)	0	3	0
15	CB	(Brazil) Maurício Ramos	26 (1)	2	2 (1)	0	1	0	6	0	35 (2)	2	9	0
17	CM	(Brazil) Tinga	15 (9)	2	0	0	0	0	7 (1)	0	22 (10)	2	3	0
18	LM	(Brazil) João Arthur	0	0	2 (2)	0	0 (1)	0	0	0	2 (3)	0	0	0
19	ST	(Brazil) Lenny	0 (2)	0	6 (2)	2	1 (1)	0	0	0	7 (5)	2	0	0
20	CF	(Brazil) Tadeu	4 (9)	1	0	0	0	0	2	2	6 (9)	3	3	1
21	DM	(Brazil) Souza	0 (2)	0	3 (1)	0	0 (2)	0	0	0	3 (5)	0	2	0
21	LW	(Brazil) Luan	9 (4)	0	0	0	0	0	6 (1)	3	15 (5)	3	5	0
22	GK	(Brazil) Deola	21 (1)	0	2	0	2	0	7	0	32 (1)	0	1	0
23	CB	(Brazil) Danilo	28	1	16	1	8	0	8	1	60	3	9	1
25	ST	(Brazil) Vinícius	4 (8)	0	2 (2)	0	0 (1)	0	0	0	6 (11)	0	3	0
26	AM	(Brazil) Jean	0 (3)	0	0	0	0	0	0	0	0 (3)	0	0	0
28	CM	(Brazil) Marcos Assunção	25 (3)	6	0	0	2	0	7	4	34 (3)	10	8	3
29	CF	(Brazil) Dinei	7 (3)	2	0	0	0	0	0 (3)	0	7 (6)	2	1	0
30	ST	(Brazil) Kleber (vc)	22	8	0	0	0	0	6	2	28	10	10	1
32	CF	(Brazil) Max	0	0	0	0	0	0	0 (1)	0	0 (1)	0	0	0
32	RB	(Brazil) Luís Felipe	2 (3)	0	0	0	0	0	0	0	2 (3)	0	0	0
33	CB	(Brazil) Gualberto	2	0	2 (3)	0	0	0	0	0	4 (3)	0	4	2
34	LB	(Brazil) Gabriel Silva	15 (2)	2	3 (1)	0	0	0	6	0	24 (3)	2	6	0
35	DM	(Brazil) Anselmo	0	0	1 (1)	0	0	0	0	0	1 (1)	0	0	0
36	CB	(Brazil) Leandro Amaro	5 (1)	1	0	0	0	0	0 (2)	0	5 (3)	1	1	0
37	LM	(Brazil) Ivo	0 (2)	0	3 (5)	0	1 (2)	0	0	0	4 (9)	0	0	0
38	DM	(Brazil) Bruno Turco	1 (1)	0	0	0	0	0	0	0	1 (1)	0	0	0
40	ST	(Brazil) Patrik	6 (13)	0	0	0	0	0	0 (2)	0	6 (15)	0	4	0
45	GK	(Brazil) Carlos	0	0	0	0	0	0	0	0	0	0	0	0
56	ST	(Brazil) Paulo Henrique	0 (5)	0	0	0	0 (2)	0	0	0	0 (7)	0	0	0
77	ST	(Brazil) Bruno Oliveira	0	0	0	0	0	0	0	0	0	0	0	0
88	ST	(Brazil) Ewerthon	19 (6)	7	3 (1)	1	1 (4)	1	1 (2)	0	24 (13)	9	2	0
99	AM	(Brazil) Lincoln	14 (5)	3	1 (2)	1	5	2	2 (3)	0	22 (10)	6	3	0

Note: Apps – Starting appearance (Substitute appearance)

=== Transfers ===
==== In ====
No.	Pos.	Name	From	Date
23	CB	(Brazil) Danilo	(Brazil) Atlético Paranaense	5 January 2010
8	CM	(Brazil) Márcio Araújo	(Brazil) Atlético Mineiro	5 January 2010
2	FB	(Brazil) Eduardo	(Brazil) Guarani	5 January 2010
4	CB	(Brazil) Léo	(Brazil) Grêmio	5 January 2010
3	DM	(Brazil) Edinho	(Italy) Lecce	10 January 2010
16	AM	(Brazil) William	(Brazil) Vitória	10 January 2010
99	AM	(Brazil) Lincoln	(Turkey) Galatasaray	12 March 2010
88	ST	(Brazil) Ewerthon	(Spain) Real Zaragoza	12 March 2010
37	LM	(Brazil) Ivo	(Brazil) Juventude	15 March 2010
14	RB	(Brazil) Vítor	(Brazil) Goiás	25 March 2010
56	ST	(Brazil) Paulo Henrique	(Netherlands) Heerenveen	30 March 2010
28	CM	(Brazil) Marcos Assunção	(Brazil) Grêmio Prudente	25 April 2010
36	CB	(Brazil) Leandro Amaro	(Brazil) Botafogo-SP	27 April 2010
30	ST	(Brazil) Kleber	(Brazil) Cruzeiro	4 June 2010
20	CF	(Brazil) Tadeu	(Brazil) Grêmio Prudente	16 June 2010
17	CM	(Brazil) Tinga	(Brazil) Ponte Preta	7 July 2010
10	AM	(Chile) Jorge Valdívia	(United Arab Emirates) Al Ain	27 July 2010
11	DM	(Brazil) Rivaldo	(Brazil) Avaí	28 July 2010
4	CB	(Brazil) Fabrício	(Brazil) Flamengo	30 July 2010
32	CF	(Brazil) Max	(Brazil) Paraná	9 August 2010

==== Out ====
No.	Pos.	Name	To	Date
3	DM	(Brazil) Edmílson	(Spain) Real Zaragoza	5 January 2010
9	CF	(Brazil) Vágner Love	(Brazil) Flamengo	5 January 2010
33	CB	(Brazil) Maurício	(Brazil) Grêmio	5 January 2010
28	CF	(Brazil) Obina	(Brazil) Flamengo	5 January 2010
18	DM	(Brazil) Jumar	(Brazil) Vasco da Gama	5 January 2010
30	ST	(Paraguay) José Ortigoza	(Paraguay) Sol de América	5 January 2010
8	RW	(Brazil) Willians	(Brazil) Fluminense	5 January 2010
13	CB	(Brazil) Marcão	(Brazil) Goiás	5 January 2010
34	LB	(Brazil) Jefferson	(Brazil) Grêmio Prudente	5 January 2010
27	AM	(Brazil) Felipe	(Brazil) Rio Branco	5 January 2010
20	CF	(Brazil) Robert	(Mexico) Monterrey	19 May 2010
31	ST	(Brazil) Bruno Paulo	(Brazil) Vasco da Gama	14 June 2010
7	AM	(Brazil) Diego Souza	(Brazil) Atlético Mineiro	30 June 2010
11	LW	(Brazil) Marquinhos	(Brazil) Flamengo	9 July 2010
10	AM	(Brazil) Cleiton Xavier	(Ukraine) Metalist	14 July 2010
77	RB	(Chile) Luis Figueroa	(Chile) Unión Española	20 July 2010
2	FB	(Brazil) Eduardo	(Brazil) Vitória	6 August 2010
4	CB	(Brazil) Léo	(Brazil) Cruzeiro	13 August 2010
6	LB	(Colombia) Pablo Armero	(Italy) Udinese	28 August 2010
56	ST	(Brazil) Paulo Henrique	Released	30 August 2010

==== Loaned in ====
No.	Pos.	Name	To	Date	End of Loan
21	LW	(Brazil) Luan	(France) Toulouse	4 August 2010	31 July 2011
29	CF	(Brazil) Dinei	(Brazil) Atlético Paranaense	17 September 2010	31 December 2010

==== Loaned out ====
No.	Pos.	Name	To	Date	End of Loan
26	AM	(Brazil) Deyvid Sacconi	(Brazil) Goiás	25 March 2010	16 June 2010
29	ST	(Brazil) Daniel Lovinho	(Brazil) Goiás	25 March 2010	7 July 2010
16	AM	(Brazil) William	(Brazil) Goiás	25 March 2010	31 December 2010
17	RB	(Brazil) Wendel	(Brazil) Goiás	25 March 2010	31 December 2010
29	ST	(Brazil) Daniel Lovinho	(Brazil) Ponte Preta	7 July 2010	31 December 2010
21	DM	(Brazil) Souza	(Brazil) Ponte Preta	7 July 2010	31 December 2010
37	LM	(Brazil) Ivo	(Brazil) Ponte Preta	7 July 2010	31 December 2010
26	AM	(Brazil) Deyvid Sacconi	(Brazil) Grêmio Prudente	16 June 2010	31 December 2010
32	CF	(Brazil) Max	(Brazil) Náutico	17 September 2010	31 December 2010

=== Scorers ===
Position	Nation	Playing position	Name	Campeonato Paulista	Copa do Brasil	Campeonato Brasileiro	Copa Sul-Americana	Total
1	(Brazil)	FW	Robert	10	4	0	0	14
2	(Brazil)	FW	Kleber	0	0	8	2	10
=	(Brazil)	MF	Marcos Assunção	0	0	6	4	10
3	(Brazil)	FW	Ewerthon	1	1	7	0	9
4	(Brazil)	MF	Diego Souza	7	1	0	0	8
5	(Brazil)	MF	Cleiton Xavier	5	1	1	0	7
6	(Brazil)	MF	Lincoln	1	2	3	0	6
7	(Brazil)	FW	Luan	0	0	0	3	3
=	(Brazil)	FW	Tadeu	0	0	1	2	3
=	(Brazil)	DF	Danilo	1	0	1	1	3
=	(Brazil)	DF	Léo	2	1	0	0	3
8	(Brazil)	FW	Dinei	0	0	2	0	2
=	(Chile)	MF	Jorge Valdívia	0	0	2	0	2
=	(Brazil)	MF	Tinga	0	0	2	0	2
=	(Brazil)	FW	Lenny	2	0	0	0	2
=	(Brazil)	MF	Edinho	0	1	1	0	2
=	(Brazil)	MF	Márcio Araújo	0	0	2	0	2
=	(Brazil)	DF	Maurício Ramos	0	0	2	0	2
=	(Brazil)	DF	Gabriel Silva	0	0	2	0	2
=	(Brazil)	MF	Deyvid Sacconi	2	0	0	0	2
9	(Brazil)	MF	Rivaldo	0	0	1	0	1
=	(Brazil)	DF	Leandro Amaro	0	0	1	0	1
/	/	/	Own goals	0	0	0	0	0
			Total	31	11	42	12	96

=== Clean sheets ===
Position	Nation	Playing position	Name	Campeonato Paulista	Copa do Brasil	Campeonato Brasileiro	Copa Sul-Americana	Total
1	(Brazil)	GK	Marcos	3	3	5	1	12
2	(Brazil)	GK	Deola	0	2	5	3	10
3	(Brazil)	GK	Bruno	0	0	1	0	1
			Total	3	5	11	4	23

== Club ==
=== Coaching staff ===
Position	Staff
Manager	(Brazil) Muricy Ramalho (until 18 February 2010)
Manager	(Brazil) Antônio Carlos Zago (until 18 May 2010)
Manager	(Brazil) Jorge Parraga (interim manager – until 13 June 2010)
Manager	(Brazil) Luiz Felipe Scolari
Assistant managers	(Brazil) Flávio Murtosa
Assistant managers	(Brazil) Valdir Moraes
First team fitness coach	(Brazil) Anselmo Sbragia
First team fitness coach	(Brazil) Darlan Schneider
Goalkeeping coach	(Brazil) Fernando Miranda
Goalkeeping coach	(Brazil) Carlos Pracidelli
Head scout	(Brazil) Marcos Aurélio Galeano
Club doctors	(Brazil) Dr. Rubens Sampaio
Club doctors	(Brazil) Dr. Vinicius Martins
Club doctors	(Brazil) Dr. Otávio Vilhena
Reserve team manager	(Brazil) Jorge Parraga
Physiologist	(Brazil) Paulo Zogaib
Physiotherapists	(Brazil) José Rosan
Physiotherapists	(Brazil) João Carlos Ferreira
Nutritionist	(Brazil) Alessandra Favano

Last updated: 18 July 2010
Source: SE Palmeiras

(Portuguese)

=== Other information ===
Chairman	(Brazil) Luiz Gonzaga de Mello Belluzzo
Vice President	(Brazil) Gilberto Cipullo
Managing Director	(Brazil) Wlademir Pescarmona
Chief financial officer	(Brazil) Antonio José Joiozo
Ground (capacity and dimensions)	Palestra Itália (27,650 / 110x75 meters)
Ground (capacity and dimensions)	Pacaembu (37,952 / 104x70 meters)
Ground (capacity and dimensions)	Arena Barueri (35,000 / 112x70 meters)

Updated to match played 18 July 2010
Source: SE Palmeiras

(Portuguese)
