= Paulo Henrique =

Paulo Henrique may refer to:

== Footballers ==
- Paulo Henrique Filho (1965–2017), Brazilian football striker
- Paulo Henrique Souza de Oliveira (born 1943), Brazilian footballer
- Paulo Henrique (footballer, born 1972), Brazilian midfielder
- Paulo Henrique Carneiro Filho (born 1989), Brazilian football striker
- Paulo Henrique Martins Costa (born 1989), Brazilian football right-back
- Paulo Henrique Santos de Azevedo (born 1991), Brazilian forward
- Paulo Henrique Soares Pereira (born 1993), Brazilian left-back
- Paulo Henrique Rodrigues Cabral (born 1996), Portuguese football left-back
- Paulo Henrique de Oliveira Alves (born 1996), Brazilian football right-back

== Other ==
- Paulo Henrique (choreographer) (born 1968), Portuguese choreographer
- Paulo Costa (Paulo Henrique Costa, born 1991), Brazilian mixed martial artist
