= Cicinho (disambiguation) =

Cicinho (born 1980), Cícero João de Cézare, is a Brazilian football right-back.

Cicinho may also refer to:

- Cicinho (footballer, born 1986), Alex Sandro Mendonça dos Santos, Brazilian football right-back
- Cicinho (footballer, born 1988), Neuciano de Jesus Gusmão, Bulgarian football right-back
