= Tinga (footballer, born 1990) =

Brazilian footballer

Personal information
- Full name: Luiz Otávio Santos de Araújo
- Date of birth: October 12, 1990 (age 36)
- Place of birth: Bom Jardim, Rio de Janeiro, Brazil
- Height: 1.73 m (5 ft 8 in)
- Position: Midfielder

Team information
- Current team: Paulínia

Youth career
- 2005–2008: Ponte Preta

Senior career*
Years	Team	Apps	(Gls)
2009–2010	Ponte Preta	18	(4)
2010–2015	Palmeiras	59	(3)
2012	→ Ceará (loan)	5	(0)
2013	→ Figueirense (loan)	17	(0)
2014	→ Avaí (loan)	8	(0)
2014	→ Júbilo Iwata (loan)	14	(3)
2015	→ Avaí (loan)	14	(0)
2016	Suphanburi	15	(0)
2016–2017	Joinville	26	(1)
2017–2019	CRB	25	(0)
2018–2019	→ Santo André (loan)	7	(1)
2019	→ Umm Salal (loan)	7	(0)
2019	Vila Nova	13	(0)
2020	Santa Cruz	34	(0)
2021	Brusque	9	(0)
2021-2022	Botafogo-PB	33	(0)
2022	Volta Redonda	11	(0)
2023	Marcílio Dias	3	(0)
2024	Vipers	-	(0)
2024	Iporá	7	(0)
2024	União Cacoalense	2	(0)
2024	Nova Iguaçu	11	(0)
2025	Sergipe	18	(1)
2026	Brasília	8	(0)
2026	Paulínia	2	(0)

International career
2009	Brazil U-20	6	(0)
- * Club domestic league appearances and goals

Luiz Otávio Santos de Araújo (born 12 October 1990), commonly known as Tinga, is a Brazilian footballer who plays as a midfielder for Paulínia.

== Career ==
A product of Ponte Preta's youth team, Tinga became a first team regular player in early 2009 at 18 years old. He made good appearances for Ponte Preta in the Série B and attracted the interest of some big Brazilian clubs.

Tinga transferred to Palmeiras after the end of the 2010 FIFA World Cup, and since then became a first choice substitute. His first match for Palmeiras came against Santos, where Tinga scored in the second half to give Palmeiras a 2-1 win in the Série A.

On December 19, 2012, Palmeiras confirmed that loaned Tinga for Figueirense until December 2013.

== Club statistics ==
As of 15 August 2010

Club	Season	League		Brazilian Cup		South America		State League		Total	
Club	Season	Apps	Goals	Apps	Goals	Apps	Goals	Apps	Goals	Apps	Goals
Ponte Preta	2008	5	0	1	0	-	-	2	0	8	0
Ponte Preta	2009	29	2	6	1	-	-	12	1	47	4
Ponte Preta	2010	5	1	4	0	-	-	17	2	26	3
Ponte Preta	Total	39	3	11	1	-	-	31	3	81	7
Palmeiras	2010	6	1	0	0	1	0	0	0	7	1
Palmeiras	2011	0	0	0	0	0	0	0	0	0	0
Palmeiras	Total	6	1	0	0	1	0	0	0	7	1
Career total		45	4	11	1	1	0	31	3	88	8

== Honours ==
Ponte Preta

- Interior Paulista Championship: 2009

Brazil U-20

- Hexagonal International Tournament in Venezuela: 2009
