= Lincoln (footballer, born 1979) =

Brazilian footballer

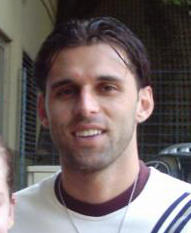
- Lincoln with Schalke 04

Personal information
- Full name: Lincoln Cássio de Souza Soares
- Date of birth: 22 January 1979 (age 47)
- Place of birth: São Brás do Suaçuí, Brazil
- Height: 1.77 m (5 ft 10 in)
- Position: Attacking midfielder

Youth career
- 1989–1997: Atlético Mineiro

Senior career*
Years	Team	Apps	(Gls)
1997–2001	Atlético Mineiro	49	(4)
2001–2004	1. FC Kaiserslautern	53	(12)
2004–2007	Schalke 04	83	(20)
2007–2009	Galatasaray	42	(13)
2010–2011	Palmeiras	25	(3)
2011	→ Avaí (loan)	17	(3)
2012–2015	Coritiba	61	(8)
2014	→ Bahia (loan)	17	(3)

International career
1999	Brazil U23	2	(0)
- * Club domestic league appearances and goals

Lincoln Cássio de Souza Soares (born 22 January 1979), commonly known as Lincoln, is a Brazilian former professional footballer who played as an attacking midfielder.

== Career ==
=== Atlético Mineiro ===
Lincoln was born in São Brás do Suaçuí. He was a member of the 1999 Atlético Mineiro team, who were runners-up in Campeonato Brasileiro Série A, a team that also included Marques, Juliano Belletti, Caçapa, Carlos Galván, and the 1999 top scorer Guilherme, among others.

=== Kaiserslautern ===
Lincoln was signed in 2001 by Kaiserslautern as a replacement for playmaker Ciriaco Sforza, who was bought by Bayern Munich. The slender, but technically gifted Lincoln made an immediate impact and contributed to a strong Kaiserslautern finish in that season. However, trouble was afoot within the club from Rhineland-Palatinate: heavy internal friction was experienced and this was not helped by a large turnover of players. The last straw was when Lincoln disappeared in spring 2004; it turned out that he had headed back to his native Brazil as he felt it would be better for an injury he was apparently suffering from. This was not endorsed by the club and earned him a season-long suspension. Many of the club's fans, members of the board, and playing staff were left embittered by the fact that Lincoln left the club while they struggled against relegation.

=== Schalke 04 ===
Lincoln's reputation had suffered and it was seen as a surprise when Schalke 04 signed the playmaker. However, his game improved while at the Ruhrgebiet club, and he was one of the strongest pillars in the surprising Schalke 2004–05 campaign that earned them second place in the Bundesliga. Although Lincoln experienced a dip in form in 2005–06, he established himself as one of the best playmakers in the Bundesliga.

=== Galatasaray ===
In June 2007, Lincoln signed a four-year contract for Galatasaray, for a fee of around €5 million. He was greeted at the Atatürk International Airport with a crowd of 5,000 Galatasaray supporters.

Lincoln scored five times in his first season in the 2007–08 Turkcell Süper Lig and he made a few important assists, showing great performances both in domestic play and UEFA Cup games. He became a favorite of the Galatasaray fans. However, he was taken out of the squad of the seventh week clash against the arch-rivals Beşiktaş. Karl-Heinz Feldkamp took Lincoln and teammate Hakan Şükür out of the match squad because they had broken the camp rules by bringing family and friends to training. After the 2–1 win, thanks to the goals of Hakan Balta and Shabani Nonda (penalty), some have called Feldkamp a braveheart and a hero, but many other supporters criticised him because of the decision.

He eventually had the opportunity to play against rivals Fenerbahçe on 9 November 2008 and scored one of the quickest goals ever seen in a Fenerbahçe – Galatasaray derbies, exactly 1:30 after the opening kickoff; however, Galatasaray gave up four straight goals after this and lost the game 4–1.

As the playmaker of the team, Lincoln was selected as the team captain in a UEFA Cup game against Hertha BSC on 3 December 2008.

In July 2009, Galatasaray put Lincoln on suspension due to his absence during pre-season training. He was later released from the Turkish side and his squad number 10 was issued to the newly appointed captain, Arda Turan.

=== Palmeiras ===
On 4 February 2010, Lincoln signed a two-year contract with SE Palmeiras. On 8 May 2010, he scored the goal to beat Vitoria 1–0 in opening round of the 2010 Campeonato Brasileiro. He made impressive appearances with Palmeiras in 2010. In 2011, Lincoln was not in the plans of manager Luiz Felipe Scolari, and failed to make usual appearances. He stated that he would like to play more or leave the club.

=== Avaí ===
On 10 August 2011, Avaí announced that Lincoln signed a loan contract with the club from Palmeiras.

=== Coritiba ===
In 2012, Coritiba signed Lincoln on a two-year contract. He won with the club the 2012 and 2013 Campeonato Paranaense.

=== Bahia ===
In 2014, he was loaned to Bahia until the end of the year.

== Career statistics ==
Appearances and goals by club, season and competition
Club	Season	League		Cup		Continental		Other (Note: Appearances in Campeonato Mineiro, Copa Centro-Oeste, Copa Sul-Minas, UI Cup, DFL-Ligapokal, Campeonato Paulista, Campeonato Paranaense and Campeonato Baiano)		Total	
Club	Season	Apps	Goals	Apps	Goals	Apps	Goals	Apps	Goals	Apps	Goals
Atlético Mineiro	1997	1	0	0	0	—		—		1	0
Atlético Mineiro	1998	17	2	6	4	—		3	1	26	7
Atlético Mineiro	1999	15	2	2	0	—		5	1	22	3
Atlético Mineiro	2000	16	0	5	2	8	0	3	0	32	2
Atlético Mineiro	2001	0	0	3	0	—		1	0	4	0
Atlético Mineiro	Total	49	4	16	6	8	0	—		85	12
1. FC Kaiserslautern	2001–02	27	8	3	3	—		—		30	11
1. FC Kaiserslautern	2002–03	20	2	4	2	—		2	0	26	4
1. FC Kaiserslautern	2003–04	6	2	0	0	—		—		6	2
1. FC Kaiserslautern	Total	53	12	7	5	—		2	0	62	17
Schalke 04	2004–05	31	12	6	2	5	1	4	0	46	15
Schalke 04	2005–06	29	5	1	0	12	6	2	0	44	11
Schalke 04	2006–07	23	3	2	2	2	0	—		27	5
Schalke 04	Total	83	20	9	4	19	7	6	0	117	31
Galatasaray	2007–08	19	5	2	0	7	2	1	0	29	7
Galatasaray	2008–09	23	8	3	0	12	1	—		38	9
Galatasaray	Total	42	13	5	0	19	3	1	0	67	16
Palmeiras	2010	19	3	5	2	5	0	3	1	32	6
Palmeiras	2011	6	0	2	0	—		6	0	14	0
Palmeiras	Total	25	3	7	2	5	0	9	1	46	6
Avaí (loan)	2011	17	3	—		—		—		17	3
Coritiba	2012	33	4	11	0	1	0	20	8	65	12
Coritiba	2013	28	4	1	0	2	0	13	2	44	6
Coritiba	2014	0	0	0	0	—		1	0	1	0
Coritiba	Total	61	8	12	0	3	0	34	10	110	18
Bahia (loan)	2014	9	1	3	0	0	0	5	2	17	3
Career total		339	51	59	17	54	10	57	13	509	104

== Honours ==
Schalke 04

- UEFA Intertoto Cup: 2004
- DFB-Ligapokal: 2005
- Schalke 04 Player of the year: 2004–05
- Nominated as one of the five best players in Bundesliga 2006, by kicker.

Galatasaray

- Turkish League: 2007–08
- Turkish Super Cup: 2008

Coritiba

- Campeonato Paranaense: 2012, 2013

Bahia

- Campeonato Baiano: 2014
