= Danilo (footballer, born 1984) =

Brazilian footballer

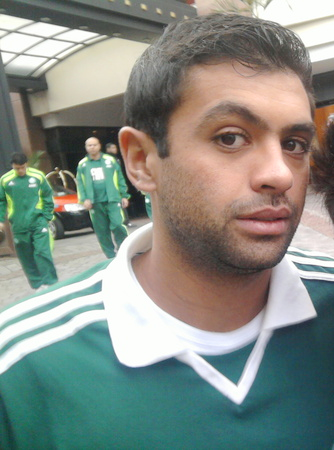
- Danilo in 2010

Personal information
- Full name: Danilo Larangeira
- Date of birth: 10 May 1984 (age 42)
- Place of birth: São Bernardo do Campo, Brazil
- Height: 1.85 m (6 ft 1 in)
- Position: Centre-back

Youth career
- 2000–2002: Etti Jundiaí

Senior career*
Years	Team	Apps	(Gls)
2003–2004	Paulista	41	(4)
2003	→ Ituano (loan)	30	(1)
2005–2009	Atlético Paranaense	131	(9)
2009	→ Palmeiras (loan)	35	(4)
2010–2011	Palmeiras	32	(1)
2011–2019	Udinese	244	(9)
2018–2019	→ Bologna (loan)	35	(1)
2019–2021	Bologna	65	(2)
2021–2022	Parma	29	(1)
- * Club domestic league appearances and goals as of 6 May 2022

Danilo Larangeira (born 10 May 1984), known simply as Danilo, is a Brazilian former professional footballer who played as centre-back.

== Career ==
=== Palmeiras ===
On 16 December 2009, Palmeiras have made official the signing from Atlético Paranaense of the central defender, first market trade of Verdão for the 2010 season, the footballer arrived on loan at the beginning of 2009. Verdão partnered with Traffic Group to sign him and Atlético Paranaense retained 20% rights.

=== Bologna ===
On August 16, 2018, Danilo joined to Bologna on loan with a purchase obligatory.

== Controversy ==
In April 2010 he gained national attention when he was accused of racism by Atlético Paranaense's defender Manoel. During a match between Atlético and Palmeiras on 15 April, TV cameras captured a scene in which Danilo called Manoel "macaco" (monkey in Portuguese language). Danilo later publicly admitted that he offended and spat at Manoel, who reported the incident to a police station in São Paulo just after the match.

In January 2013, the São Paulo Criminal Court sentenced him to one year in prison, although he was expected to have the punishment reduced to a fine on appeal.

== Career statistics ==
As of match played 23 May 2021

Club	Season	League		State League		National Cup		Continental		Total	
Club	Season	Apps	Goals	Apps	Goals	Apps	Goals	Apps	Goals	Apps	Goals
Paulista	2003	5	1	17	0	—		—		45	2
Ituano	2003	30	1	—		4	0	—		34	1
Paulista	2004	36	3	19	1	1	0	—		58	4
Atlético Paranaense	2005	36	2	15	1	3	0	12	1	66	4
Atlético Paranaense	2006	35	2	17	3	3	0	7	0	62	5
Atlético Paranaense	2007	34	2	19	1	7	0	2	0	62	3
Atlético Paranaense	2008	26	3	14	2	2	0	4	1	46	6
Atlético Paranaense	Total	131	9	65	7	15	0	25	2	236	18
Palmeiras	2009	35	4	21	0	—		10	0	66	4
Palmeiras	2010	28	1	16	1	8	0	8	1	60	3
Palmeiras	2011	4	0	15	1	7	1	0	0	26	2
Palmeiras	Total	67	5	52	2	15	1	18	1	152	9
Udinese	2011–12	37	1	—		1	0	11	1	49	2
Udinese	2012–13	32	2	—		1	0	8	0	41	2
Udinese	2013–14	36	1	—		3	0	4	0	43	1
Udinese	2014–15	37	2	—		3	0	—		40	2
Udinese	2015–16	34	0	—		3	0	—		37	0
Udinese	2016–17	36	2	—		1	0	—		37	2
Udinese	2017–18	32	1	—		3	1	—		35	2
Udinese	Total	244	9	0	0	15	1	23	1	282	11
Bologna	2018–19	35	1	—		0	0	—		35	1
Bologna	2019–20	30	2	—		1	0	—		31	2
Bologna	2020–21	35	0	—		0	0	—		35	0
Bologna	Total	100	3	0	0	1	0	0	0	101	3
Career total		613	30	155	10	51	2	66	4	885	47

== Honours ==
Ituano

- Brazilian League C: 2003

Atlético Paranaense

- Paraná State League: 2005
