= Marcos Assunção =

Brazilian footballer (born 1976)

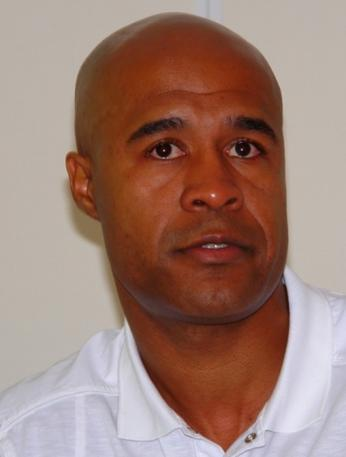

Personal information
- Full name: Marcos dos Santos Assunção
- Date of birth: 25 July 1976 (age 50)
- Place of birth: Caieiras, Brazil
- Height: 1.78 m (5 ft 10 in)
- Position: Central midfielder

Senior career*
Years	Team	Apps	(Gls)
1993–1995	Rio Branco	36	(7)
1995–1997	Santos	33	(3)
1997–1998	Flamengo	42	(7)
1998–1999	Santos	78	(21)
1999–2002	Roma	55	(9)
2002–2007	Betis	143	(29)
2007–2008	Al Ahli	12	(1)
2008–2009	Al Shabab	21	(3)
2009–2010	Grêmio Prudente	19	(5)
2010–2012	Palmeiras	78	(29)
2013	Santos	4	(0)
2014	Figueirense	2	(0)
2014	Portuguesa	6	(0)
2015	Criciúma	3	(1)
2016	Sampaio Corrêa	2	(0)
Total		534	(113)

International career
1998–2000	Brazil	11	(1)
- * Club domestic league appearances and goals

Marcos dos Santos Assunção (born 25 July 1976) is a Brazilian former professional footballer. A central midfielder, he was renowned as a world-class free kick specialist.

Assunção played for clubs in four countries; he is best known for his spells with Roma in Italy and Real Betis in Spain.

At international level, he represented Brazil on 11 occasions between 1998 and 2000, scoring a single goal; he was a member of the team that finished third at the 1998 CONCACAF Gold Cup.

== Club career ==
=== Early years and Roma ===
Born in Caieiras, São Paulo, Assunção began his career at Rio Branco, where he stayed two years. He then played for Santos, scoring three goals in 33 Série A games and moving to Flamengo in 1998.

After impressive performances with Flamengo, Assunção was bought by Serie A's Roma for 1999–2000. In his first year, he netted once in 21 appearances, adding another in five UEFA Cup matches; he would be used regularly during his three-year stay, proving himself a threat at set pieces as the capital club lifted the Scudetto in his second season.

=== Betis ===
Assunção joined Spanish side Real Betis in August 2002, being an undisputed first-choice from the start and scoring several goals from free kicks. His debut as a Verdiblanco was spectacular, as he netted once in a 4–2 away win against Deportivo de La Coruña through a 40-yarder with his weaker left foot, then proceeded to strike the woodwork on no less than three occasions; he scored eight goals as the Andalusian team finished fourth at the end of the 2004–05 campaign, subsequently qualifying for the UEFA Champions League.

During 2005–06, Assunção played in seven Champions League contests, failing to appear in the UEFA Cup due to injury. He only managed to score once in the domestic league.

On 25 July 2006, his 30th birthday, Assunção became a citizen of Spain due to his time spent at Betis, but the 2006–07 season would be however his last in the country. On 22 August 2007, he left Betis by mutual consent, having failed to fit into Héctor Cúper's plans – he gave a press conference in which he said goodbye to the club and fans, saying that he would not join another Spanish club.

=== Later career ===
In the following two years, Assunção played in the United Arab Emirates, consecutively with Al Ahli and Al Shabab. On 26 September 2009 the 33-year-old returned to his homeland, signing with Grêmio Prudente (formerly Barueri). However, after a mere months, he switched sides again, moving to Palmeiras on a one-year deal.

Assunção was selected by manager Luiz Felipe Scolari as one of the club's four "leaders", alongside Marcos, Danilo and Edinho. In the season's Copa Sudamericana, he provided one assist and scored from a long-range kick in a 3–0 win against Vitória (3–2 aggregate win).

On 6 January 2013, following a contract dispute, Assunção left Palmeiras. Five days later the 36-year-old rejoined Santos after 14 years, penning a deal until December.

In January 2014, Assunção joined Figueirense after his contract with Santos expired. In April, however, he cut ties with the club, signing a short-term deal at Portuguesa in June.

On 2 September 2014, after refusing to stay on the bench in some matches, Assunção had his contract with Lusa terminated.

== International career ==
Assunção made 11 appearances for the Brazil national team during two years. He made his debut against El Salvador, and scored his only international goal against Russia on 18 November 1998 in a 5–1 friendly win.

Assunção was dropped from the Seleção after a poor performance during a 2002 FIFA World Cup qualifier against Chile – a 0–3 away loss – and was never called up since.

== Personal life ==
Both Marcos Senna, who spent most of his career at Villarreal CF, even representing the Spain national team, and Márcio Senna, are Assunção's cousins.

== Honours ==
Santos

- Torneio Rio – São Paulo: 1997
- Copa CONMEBOL: 1998

Roma

- Serie A: 2000–01
- Supercoppa Italiana: 2001

Betis

- Copa del Rey: 2004–05

Al Ahli

- UAE President's Cup: 2007–08

Palmeiras

- Copa do Brasil: 2012

Figueirense

- Campeonato Catarinense: 2014
