= Chico (footballer, born February 1987) =

Brazilian footballer

Personal information
- Full name: Luis Francisco Grando
- Date of birth: 2 February 1987 (age 39)
- Place of birth: Pato Branco, Brazil
- Height: 1.86 m (6 ft 1 in)
- Positions: Centre back; defensive midfielder

Youth career
- 2000–2002: Paraná

Senior career*
Years	Team	Apps	(Gls)
2003–2004	PSTC	26	(3)
2005–2011	Atlético Paranaense	82	(2)
2011–2012	Palmeiras	46	(2)
2012	→ Coritiba (loan)	16	(0)
2013–2015	Coritiba	58	(4)
2014–2015	→ Gaziantepspor (loan)	33	(5)
2015–2020	Antalyaspor	101	(5)
2020–2021	Goiás	5	(0)
2021	FC Cascavel	0	(0)
- * Club domestic league appearances and goals as of 14:57, 7 February 2022 (UTC)

Luis Francisco Grando (born 2 February 1987), known as Chico, is a Brazilian professional footballer who most recently played as a defensive midfielder or defender. He can also play as a left back.

Chico made his professional debut with Atlético-PR in 2–3 home defeat to Grêmio in the Campeonato Brasileiro on 12 November 2006. He scored first professional goal with Atlético-PR in a 3–3 away draw with Londrina in the Campeonato Paranaense on 1 February 2007.

== Honours ==
Atlético Paranaense

- Campeonato Paranaense: 2009

Coritiba

- Campeonato Paranaense: 2013
