= Fernando Aguiar (Brazilian footballer) =

Brazilian footballer (born 1991)

Personal information
- Full name: José Fernando Oliveira de Aguiar Júnior
- Date of birth: November 17, 1991 (age 34)
- Place of birth: Porto Alegre, Brazil
- Height: 1.88 m (6 ft 2 in)
- Position: Defensive midfielder

Youth career
- 2008–2010: Palmeiras

Senior career*
Years	Team	Apps	(Gls)
2010–2012	Palmeiras	3	(0)
2012	Flamengo SP	7	(0)
2012–2013	Boa Esporte	17	(3)
2013–2016	Penapolense	41	(1)
2013	→ Ponte Preta (loan)	10	(0)
2014	→ Mirassol (loan)	8	(0)
2015	→ Paysandu (loan)	2	(0)
2016	→ Oeste (loan)	0	(0)
2017	Rio Claro	18	(3)
2017	Oeste	6	(1)
2018	Barretos	11	(1)
2018	Nacional SP	0	(0)
2019	São Bernardo	11	(0)
2020	Barretos	6	(0)
Total		140	(9)
- * Club domestic league appearances and goals as of 18:27, 18 March 2024 (UTC)

José Fernando Oliveira de Aguiar Júnior, or simply Fernando Aguiar (born November 17, 1991), is a Brazilian former defensive midfielder.

== Career ==
=== Palmeiras ===
Fernando Aguiar made his league debut for Palmeiras against Atlético Mineiro on 21 November 2010.

=== Flamengo SP ===
Fernando Aguiar made his league debut for Flamengo SP against Inter de Limeira on 5 February 2012.

=== Penapolense ===
Fernando Aguiar made his league debut for Penapolense against Mogi Mirim on 24 January 2013. He scored his first goal for the club against São Bernardo on 23 March 2013.

=== Ponte Preta ===
Fernando Aguiar made his league debut for Ponte Preta against Flamengo on 30 May 2013.

=== Mirassol ===
Fernando Aguiar made his league debut for Mirassol against Guaratinguetá on 9 March 2014.

=== Paysandu ===
Fernando Aguiar made his league debut for Paysandu against Náutico on 16 June 2015.

=== Rio Claro ===
Fernando Aguiar made his league debut for Rio Claro against Batatais on 11 February 2017. He scored his first goal for the club against São Caetano on 20 February 2017, scoring in the 46th minute.

=== Second spell at Oeste ===
During his second spell at Oeste, Fernando Aguiar made his league debut for the club against Paysandu. He scored his first goal for the club against Santa Cruz on 1 July 2017, scoring in the 90th+2nd minute.

=== Barretos ===
Fernando Aguiar made his league debut for Barretos against Marília on 17 January 2018. He scored his first goal for the club against São Carlos on 24 January 2018, scoring in the 48th minute.

=== São Bernardo ===
Fernando Aguiar made his league debut for São Bernardo against Portuguesa on 20 January 2019.

=== Second spell at Barretos ===
During his second spell with the club, Fernando Aguiar made his league debut for Barretos against Grêmio Osasco on 25 January 2020.
