= Gerley (footballer) =

Brazilian footballer (born 1990)

Personal information
- Full name: Gerley Ferreira de Souza
- Date of birth: 11 September 1990 (age 36)
- Place of birth: Central de Minas, Brazil
- Height: 1.82 m (5 ft 11 1/2 in)
- Positions: Left back; attacking midfielder

Team information
- Current team: Resende

Youth career
- 2003–2006: Caxias

Senior career*
Years	Team	Apps	(Gls)
2007–2011	Caxias		
2011–2015	Palmeiras	14	(0)
2012	→ Bahia (loan)	3	(0)
2013	→ Ceará (loan)	0	(0)
2013	→ Juventude (loan)	8	(0)
2014	→ Náutico (loan)	0	(0)
2016	Madureira	0	(0)
2017	Democrata-GV	9	(1)
2017	Botafogo-SP	16	(2)
2018	Bragantino	0	(0)
2018	São Caetano	0	(0)
2019–2020	Portuguesa	15	(1)
2021	Rio Branco-ES	0	(0)
2022	Desportiva Ferroviária	8	(1)
2023	São Caetano	11	(0)
2023	Americano	8	(0)
2024	Jataiense	8	(0)
2024–	Resende	8	(1)
- * Club domestic league appearances and goals as of 15:25, 8 August 2024 (UTC)

Gerley Ferreira de Souza (born 11 September 1990), simply known as Gerley, is a Brazilian footballer who plays as either a left back or an attacking midfielder for Resende.

== Career ==
Despite being born in Minas Gerais state, Gerley started his professional career with Caxias of the state of Rio Grande do Sul. Soon he got the attention of the big Brazilian teams.

In 2011, he was voted as the best left back of the Campeonato Gaúcho with Caxias. On July he was transferred to Palmeiras of the Série A.

== Honours ==
Bahia

- Campeonato Baiano: 2012
