= Deivid (footballer, born 18 January 1989) =

Brazilian footballer

Personal information
- Full name: Deivid Willian da Silva
- Date of birth: 18 January 1989 (age 37)
- Place of birth: Londrina, Brazil
- Height: 1.74 m (5 ft 9 in)
- Position: Defensive midfielder

Youth career
- 2005: PSTC
- 2005–2009: Atlético Paranaense

Senior career*
Years	Team	Apps	(Gls)
2009–2018	Atlético Paranaense	291	(7)
2018–2019	Sport Recife	16	(0)
2019	→ Guarani (loan)	35	(0)
2020	Guarani	33	(0)
2021	Inter de Limeira	11	(0)
2021–2022	Vila Nova	19	(0)
- * Club domestic league appearances and goals as of 17:32, 17 May 2019 (UTC)

Deivid Willian da Silva (born 18 January 1989), simply known as Deivid, is a former Brazilian footballer who plays as a defensive midfielder.

== Club career ==
Born in Londrina, Paraná, Deivid joined Atlético Paranaense's youth setup in 2005, aged 16, after starting it out at hometown's Paraná Soccer Technical Center. On 30 May 2010 he made his first team – and Série A – debut, playing the last 26 minutes of a 1–4 away loss against Internacional.

Deivid only scored his first senior goal on 8 February 2012, netting the first of a 4–0 home routing over Toledo Colônia Work for the Campeonato Paranaense championship. On 1 October 2014 he renewed his link with Furacão, running until December 2018.

== Career statistics ==
As of 6 November 2016

Club	Season	League			State League		Cup		Continental		Other		Total	
Club	Season	Division	Apps	Goals	Apps	Goals	Apps	Goals	Apps	Goals	Apps	Goals	Apps	Goals
Atlético Paranaense	2010	Série A	17	0	0	0	1	0	—		—		18	0
Atlético Paranaense	2011	Série A	34	0	6	0	4	0	—		—		44	0
Atlético Paranaense	2012	Série B	28	0	20	1	7	0	—		—		55	1
Atlético Paranaense	2013	Série A	19	0	0	0	9	0	—		—		28	0
Atlético Paranaense	2014	Série A	33	0	1	0	2	1	5 (Note: Appearance(s) in Copa Libertadores)	0	—		41	1
Atlético Paranaense	2015	Série A	13	0	8	0	4	0	2 (Note: Appearance(s) in Copa Sudamericana)	0	—		27	0
Atlético Paranaense	2016	Série A	9	1	13	3	2	0	—		4 (Note: Appearance(s) in Primeira Liga)	0	28	4
Atlético Paranaense	Total		153	1	48	4	29	1	7	0	4	0	241	6
Career total			153	1	48	4	29	1	7	0	4	0	241	6
