= Rafael Cruz (footballer) =

Brazilian footballer

Personal information
- Full name: Rafael Cruz Llampa
- Date of birth: January 18, 1985 (age 41)
- Place of birth: São Paulo, Brazil
- Height: 1.76 m (5 ft 9 1/2 in)
- Position: Right back

Team information
- Current team: São Bernardo

Senior career*
Years	Team	Apps	(Gls)
2004	Santo André		
2004–2007	Democrata		
2008–2010	Atlético Goianiense	32	(0)
2010–2013	Atlético Mineiro	21	(1)
2011–2012	→ Atlético Goianiense (loan)	53	(0)
2013	→ Ceará (loan)	12	(0)
2013	→ Atlético Goianiense (loan)	11	(0)
2014–	São Bernardo		
- * Club domestic league appearances and goals as of September 4, 2013

Rafael Cruz Llampa (born 18 January 1985), is a Brazilian footballer who plays as a right back for Campeonato Brasileiro Série B club São Bernardo.

== Honours ==
Santo André

- Copa do Brasil: 2004
