= Thiago Heleno =

Brazilian footballer

Personal information
- Full name: Thiago Heleno Henrique Ferreira
- Date of birth: 17 September 1988 (age 38)
- Place of birth: Sete Lagoas, Brazil
- Height: 1.87 m (6 ft 2 in)
- Position: Centre back

Team information
- Current team: Paysandu
- Number: 44

Youth career
- 2004–2005: Cruzeiro

Senior career*
Years	Team	Apps	(Gls)
2006–2010	Cruzeiro	114	(3)
2010–2016	Deportivo Maldonado	0	(0)
2010	→ Corinthians (loan)	5	(1)
2011–2012	→ Palmeiras (loan)	57	(4)
2013	→ Criciúma (loan)	0	(0)
2014–2015	→ Figueirense (loan)	87	(4)
2016	→ Atlético Paranaense (loan)	42	(5)
2017–2025	Athletico Paranaense	192	(9)
2025–	Paysandu	11	(1)

International career
2005	Brazil U17		
2007	Brazil U20	6	(0)
- * Club domestic league appearances and goals as of 19 December 2025

Thiago Heleno Henrique Ferreira (born 17 September 1988), known as Thiago Heleno, is a Brazilian footballer who plays for Paysandu as a central defender.

== Club career ==
Born in Sete Lagoas, Minas Gerais, Thiago Heleno was a Cruzeiro youth graduate. He made his first team – and Série A – debut on 16 April 2006, coming on as a second-half substitute for injured Moisés in a 1–2 away loss against São Caetano.

Thiago Heleno scored his first professional goal on 3 June 2006, netting the first in a 2–0 win at Fortaleza. He finished the year with 17 appearances, losing his recently gained first-choice status in September.

Thiago Heleno appeared regularly for Raposa in the following years, being an undisputed starter in 2008. In August 2010 he was sold to ghost club Deportivo Maldonado, being subsequently loaned to fellow top league club Corinthians.

Thiago Heleno appeared in only five league matches (scoring in a 3–4 home loss against Atlético Goianiense), and was released at the end of the season. In January 2011 he moved to fierce rival Palmeiras.

On 26 March 2011, Thiago Heleno scored a double in a 3–0 Campeonato Paulista home win against Bragantino, which granted his team's qualification to the following round. He was released in December 2012, after the club's relegation.

In 2013 Thiago Heleno signed for Criciúma, but left the club in July after failing to make a single appearance for the club. On 15 January 2014 he joined Figueirense, winning promotion from Série B in his first season.

== International career ==
Thiago Heleno represented Brazil at under-17 and under-20 levels, winning the 2005 South American Under 17 Football Championship with the former and the 2007 South American Youth Championship with the latter.

== Career statistics ==
As of 17 July 2023

Appearances and goals by club, season and competition
Club	Season	League			State League		Cup		Continental		Other		Total	
Club	Season	Division	Apps	Goals	Apps	Goals	Apps	Goals	Apps	Goals	Apps	Goals	Apps	Goals
Cruzeiro	2006	Série A	17	1	0	0	0	0	1 (Note: Appearance(s) in Copa Sudamericana)	0	—		18	1
Cruzeiro	2007	Série A	27	0	4	1	2	0	2	1	—		35	2
Cruzeiro	2008	Série A	32	0	7	1	0	0	7 (Note: Appearance(s) in Copa Libertadores)	1	—		46	2
Cruzeiro	2009	Série A	16	0	6	0	0	0	8	0	—		30	0
Cruzeiro	2010	Série A	4	0	6	0	0	0	9	0	—		19	0
Cruzeiro	Subtotal		96	1	17	2	2	0	27	2	0	0	142	5
Corinthians	2010	Série A	5	1	—		—		—		—		5	1
Palmeiras	2011	Série A	29	0	14	3	5	0	2	0	—		50	3
Palmeiras	2012	Série A	14	1	0	0	4	1	2	0	—		20	2
Palmeiras	Subtotal		43	1	14	3	9	1	4	0	0	0	70	5
Criciúma	2013	Série A	0	0	0	0	0	0	—		—		0	0
Figueirense	2014	Série B	33	2	13	2	2	1	—		—		48	5
Figueirense	2015	Série A	25	0	16	0	4	1	—		—		45	1
Figueirense	Subtotal		58	2	29	2	6	2	—		—		93	6
Athletico Paranaense	2016	Série A	33	4	9	1	7	0	—		2 (Note: Appearance(s) in Primeira Liga)	0	51	5
Athletico Paranaense	2017	Série A	28	4	4	0	2	0	9	1	—		43	5
Athletico Paranaense	2018	Série A	20	2	0	0	7	1	7	0	—		34	3
Athletico Paranaense	2019	Série A	16	1	0	0	0	0	4	0	—		20	1
Athletico Paranaense	2020	Série A	29	2	7	0	1	0	6	0	1 (Note: Appearance(s) in Supercopa do Brasil)	0	44	2
Athletico Paranaense	2021	Série A	28	1	4	0	9	0	10	0	—		51	1
Athletico Paranaense	2022	Série A	13	0	4	0	2	0	5	0	2 (Note: Appearance(s) in Recopa Sudamericana)	0	26	0
Athletico Paranaense	2023	Série A	13	0	11	0	6	0	5	0	—		35	0
Athletico Paranaense	Subtotal		180	14	39	1	34	1	46	1	5	0	304	17
Career total			380	19	99	8	51	4	77	3	5	0	614	34

== Honours ==
=== Club ===
Cruzeiro

- Campeonato Mineiro: 2006, 2008, 2009

Palmeiras

- Copa do Brasil: 2012

Athletico Paranaense

- Campeonato Paranaense: 2016, 2020, 2023
- Copa Sudamericana: 2018, 2021

=== International ===
Brazil U17

- South American Under 17 Football Championship: 2005

Brazil U20

- South American Youth Championship: 2007

=== Individual ===
- Copa Libertadores Team of the Tournament: 2022
