= Pedro Carmona (footballer) =

Brazilian footballer

Personal information
- Full name: Pedro Carmona da Silva Neto
- Date of birth: 15 April 1988 (age 38)
- Place of birth: Porto Alegre, RS, Brazil
- Height: 1.76 m (5 ft 9 in)
- Position: Attacking midfielder

Senior career*
Years	Team	Apps	(Gls)
2007–2008	Juventude	1	(0)
2008	Internacional B	0	(0)
2008–2011	São José	24	(5)
2010	→ Figueirense (loan)	6	(3)
2011	→ Criciúma (loan)	34	(2)
2011–2012	Palmeiras	11	(1)
2011-2012	São Caetano	44	(4)
2014–2016	Náutico	23	(8)
2016	Grêmio Novorizontino	12	(6)
2016	Vila Nova	6	(0)
2016	Oeste	10	(3)
2017	Audax	7	(4)
2017	Fortaleza	4	(1)
2017	Suwon FC	9	(1)
2018	Paysandu	25	(4)
2019	Grêmio Novorizontino	8	(0)
2019	Sport Recife	12	(2)
- * Club domestic league appearances and goals as of 21:35, 31 October 2019 (UTC)

Pedro Carmona da Silva Neto (born 15 April 1988) is a Brazilian retired professional footballer who played as an attacking midfielder.
