= Max Pardalzinho =

Brazilian footballer (born 1987)

Personal information
- Full name: Maximiliano Ezequiel dos Santos
- Date of birth: 14 May 1987 (age 39)
- Place of birth: Morrinhos, Brazil
- Height: 1.69 m (5 ft 7 in)
- Position: Forward

Senior career*
Years	Team	Apps	(Gls)
2009–2010	Morrinhos	22	(14)
2010–2011	Vila Nova	27	(5)
2011	Palmeiras	0	(0)
2011	Goiás	11	(0)
2012	Guarani		
2012–?	Ipatinga		
- * Club domestic league appearances and goals

Maximiliano Ezequiel dos Santos or simply Max Santos or Pardalzinho (born 14 May 1987) is a Brazilian former professional footballer who played as a forward.
