= Luan (footballer, born 21 September 1988) =

Brazilian footballer

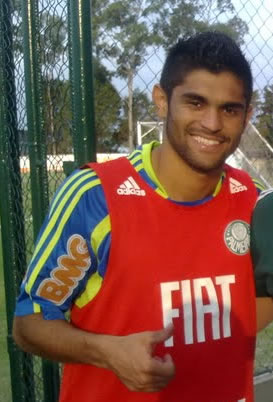
- Luan with Palmeiras in 2011

Personal information
- Full name: Luan Michel de Louzã
- Date of birth: 21 September 1988 (age 38)
- Place of birth: Araras, Brazil
- Height: 1.86 m (6 ft 1 in)
- Position: Forward

Team information
- Current team: Gama

Senior career*
Years	Team	Apps	(Gls)
2007	União São João	14	(6)
2008–2009	São Caetano	37	(9)
2009–2011	Toulouse	14	(1)
2010	→ Palmeiras (loan)	13	(0)
2011–2017	Palmeiras	54	(12)
2013–2014	→ Cruzeiro (loan)	20	(5)
2014–2015	→ Al Sharjah (loan)	3	(1)
2016	→ Atlético Paranaense (loan)	6	(0)
2017	→ Red Bull Brasil (loan)	7	(1)
2017	→ América Mineiro (loan)	30	(8)
2018	América Mineiro	26	(1)
2019–2020	Sport Recife	8	(3)
2020	Oeste	11	(1)
2021	Atibaia	12	(1)
2022	Portuguesa	16	(4)
2022	Floresta	11	(1)
2022	Portuguesa	0	(0)
2023	Villa Nova	11	(4)
2023	Betim	14	(6)
2023	Itabirito	16	(4)
2023	→ Gama (loan)	4	(2)
2023	Sergipe	1	(0)
2023	Gama	9	(1)
- * Club domestic league appearances and goals as of 19 November 2026

Luan Michel de Louzã, simply known as Luan (born 21 September 1988) is a Brazilian professional footballer who plays as a forward for Gama.

== Career ==
Born in Araras, Luan has played in Brazil and France for União São João, São Caetano, Toulouse and Palmeiras.
