= Cicinho (footballer, born 1986) =

Brazilian footballer

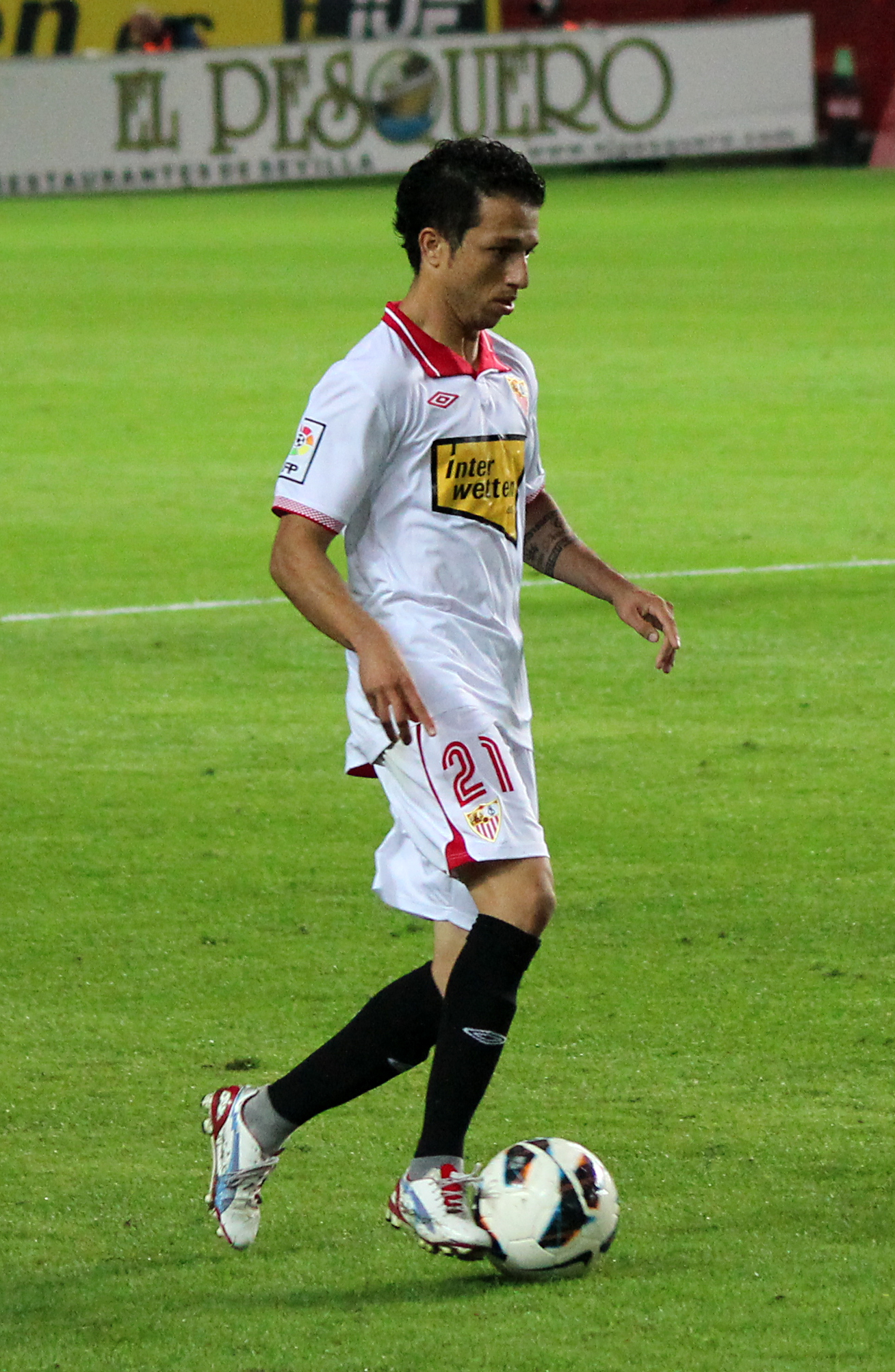
- Cicinho with Sevilla in 2012

Personal information
- Full name: Alex Sandro Mendonça dos Santos
- Date of birth: 4 August 1986 (age 40)
- Place of birth: Jundiaí, Brazil
- Height: 1.73 m (5 ft 8 in)
- Position: Right back

Youth career
- 2003–2004: Capivariano
- 2004–2005: Osvaldo Cruz
- 2006: Portuguesa
- 2006: Ferroviária

Senior career*
Years	Team	Apps	(Gls)
2007	Ituano	9	(0)
2008–2011	Oeste	13	(0)
2008–2010	→ Santo André (loan)	71	(4)
2011–2012	Palmeiras	39	(1)
2012–2015	Sevilla	19	(1)
2015	→ Numancia (loan)	15	(1)
2015–2016	Bahia	10	(0)
2017	Santo André	0	(0)
2019	Oeste	15	(0)
- * Club domestic league appearances and goals as of 29 October 2019

Alex Sandro Mendonça dos Santos (born 4 August 1986), commonly known as Cicinho, is a Brazilian footballer who plays as a right back.

== Club career ==
Born in Jundiaí, Cicinho made his senior debuts with local Ituano in 2007. He then moved to neighbouring Oeste in January of the following year, but was subsequently loaned to Santo André in May, appearing in 20 matches and scoring twice during his first year, helping the Ramalhão return to Série A after a 25-year absence.

Cicinho made his Série A debut on 10 May 2009, starting in a 1–1 home draw against Botafogo. He appeared regularly in the campaign, which ended in relegation.

On 13 January 2011 Cicinho joined Palmeiras on loan until the end of the year. In July, Verdão bought one half of the player's rights, who signed a contract until 2015.

On 30 July 2012 Cicinho signed a four-year deal with La Liga's Sevilla FC, for a €2 million fee. He made his debut in the competition on 18 August, starting in a 2–1 home win against Getafe CF.

Cicinho scored his first goal for the Andalusians on 22 October, netting the winner of a 3–2 home success against RCD Mallorca. He finished his first season abroad with 27 appearances, with his side finishing seventh.

On 27 June 2013 Cicinho suffered a severe knee injury, which took him out of action for six months. On 28 January 2015, after failing to appear with the Rojiblancos after his injury, he was loaned to Segunda División's CD Numancia until June. He made 15 appearances for the team from Soria, heading an equaliser in a 2–1 loss at Girona FC on 1 March.

Cicinho returned to his homeland on 27 July 2015, signing a deal for Série B team Esporte Clube Bahia until the next May.

== Honours ==
Palmeiras

- Copa do Brasil: 2012

Sevilla

- UEFA Europa League: 2013–14
