= Rivaldo (footballer, born 1985) =

Brazilian footballer

Personal information
- Full name: Rivaldo Barbosa de Souza
- Date of birth: 25 August 1985 (age 41)
- Place of birth: Salgadinho, Brazil
- Height: 1.81 m (5 ft 11 in)
- Positions: Defensive midfielder; left back

Youth career
- Santos

Senior career*
Years	Team	Apps	(Gls)
2004–2006	Santos	2	(0)
2006	Guarani	9	(1)
2007	Marília	11	(0)
2008	Bahia	7	(0)
2008–2009	Vaduz	19	(4)
2010	Oeste	11	(1)
2010	Avaí	5	(0)
2010–2011	Palmeiras	46	(1)
2012–2013	Sport Recife	38	(2)
2013–2014	Figueirense	22	(0)
2015	Esteghlal	3	(0)
2016	CRB	8	(0)
2016	Bragantino	9	(2)
Total		190	(11)
- * Club domestic league appearances and goals

Rivaldo Barbosa de Souza (born 25 August 1985), simply known as Rivaldo, is a Brazilian retired footballer who played as a defensive midfielder or left back.

== Club career ==
Rivaldo played for clubs in São Paulo state before moved to Bahia on 27 December 2007. After playing 7 games at Brazilian Série B, he moved to Vaduz on 23 July 2008. Then he joined Brazilian football league Sport and after a year he moved to Figueirense FC. On 20 July 2015, Rivaldo joined Persian Gulf Pro League Club Esteghlal.
