= Paulo Henrique (footballer, born September 1989) =

Brazilian footballer

Personal information
- Full name: Paulo Henrique Martins Costa
- Date of birth: September 11, 1989 (age 37)
- Place of birth: Ivinhema, Brazil
- Height: 1.74 m (5 ft 8 1/2 in)
- Position: Right back

Team information
- Current team: Atlético Goianiense

Youth career
- 2003–2006: Ivinhemense

Senior career*
Years	Team	Apps	(Gls)
2007	Ivinhemense		
2008–2010	Ferroviária		
2010–2012	Paraná	32	(1)
2011	→ Palmeiras (loan)	2	(0)
2013–	Atlético Goianiense		
- * Club domestic league appearances and goals as of 11 March 2013

Paulo Henrique Martins Costa, known simply as Paulo Henrique (born September 11, 1989 in Ivinhema, Mato Grosso do Sul), is a Brazilian football right back, who currently plays for Atlético Goianiense.

== Career ==
Paulo Henrique was signed by Palmeiras on May 19, 2011.

=== Career statistics ===
As of end of the 2011 season

Club	Season	League		Cup		Continental		State League		Total	
Club	Season	Apps	Goals	Apps	Goals	Apps	Goals	Apps	Goals	Apps	Goals
Palmeiras	2011	2	0	0	0	0	0	0	0	2	0
Palmeiras	Total	0	0	0	0	0	0	0	0	0	0
Career total		0	0	0	0	0	0	0	0	0	0
