= Patrik Silva =

Brazilian footballer

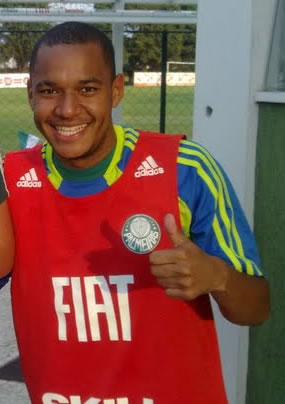
- Patrik with Palmeiras in 2011

Personal information
- Full name: Patrik Camilo Cornélio da Silva
- Date of birth: 19 July 1990 (age 36)
- Place of birth: São Paulo, Brazil
- Height: 1.70 m (5 ft 7 in)
- Position: Attacking midfielder

Youth career
- 2003–2006: Palmeiras

Senior career*
Years	Team	Apps	(Gls)
2007–2009	→ São Caetano (loan)	25	(9)
2010–2014	Palmeiras	101	(12)
2013	→ Gangwon FC (loan)	10	(1)
2013	→ Sport Recife (loan)	0	(0)
2014	→ Rio Claro (loan)	0	(0)
2015–	Rio Claro	0	(0)
- * Club domestic league appearances and goals as of 9 July 2013

Patrik Camilo Cornélio da Silva, sometimes known as just Patrik (born 19 July 1990), is a Brazilian football player who plays for Rio Claro as an attacking midfielder.

== Career ==
The youngster Patrik Silva, began his career play for Palmeiras B, and was loaned to São Caetano between 2007 and 2009. In 2010, he returned to Palmeiras, this time playing for the main squad and made his debut. He has scored 1 goal for Palmeiras in a friendly match against XV de Piracicaba.

In the 2011 Paulista Champíonship, Patrik Silva gained a starting-role in Palmeiras first-team and scored important goals to help his club throughout the competition.

On 11 March 2013, Patrick joined South Korean outfit Gangwon FC on a season-long loan deal.
