= 2012 SE Palmeiras season =

Palmeiras
2012 season
- President: Arnaldo Tirone
- Head coach: Luis Felipe Scolari (Until September); Narciso (Interim for the Corinthians game on 16 September); Gilson Kleina (since 19 September)
- Série A: 18th
- Campeonato Paulista: Quarterfinals
- Copa do Brasil: Winners
- Copa Sudamericana: Round of 16
- Top goalscorer: League: Hernán Barcos (14 goals); All: Hernán Barcos (28 goals)
- Highest home attendance: 30,942 (vs. Ponte Preta - 29 September)
- Lowest home attendance: 2,580 (vs. Figueirense - 1 July)
Home colors	Away colors	Third colors

The 2012 Season was Palmeiras's 98th season, and their 97th in Brazil's first division. Palmeiras also played in the usual state league, Campeonato Paulista, the national cup, Copa do Brasil and the continental cup, the Copa Sudamericana.

Due to the renovations taking place at Palestra Itália, since 2010, for the construction of the new Arena, Palmeiras played all of their home matches in the 2012 season at the Pacaembu Stadium.

This season was the first one, in 20 years, without the services of Palmeiras' idol goalkeeper, Marcos, after he announced his retirement from football on 4 January 2012, at the age of 38.

== Key events ==
11 July: Palmeiras won the Copa do Brasil, and enter on the group stage of 2013 Copa Libertadores.

13 September: The coach Scolari was sacked after losing streak in the Campeonato Brasileiro.

19 September: After negotiations with Paulo Roberto Falcão and Adilson Batista, Gilson Kleina was hired.

28 September: Palmeiras was dismissed by the Superior Court of Sports Justice (STJD) and punished with the loss of four home field matches, because of the confusion involving fans in the derby against Corinthians on 16 September.

18 November: After 10 years of relegation in Serie A, Palmeiras for the second time in his history will play in the second division of the Brazilian Championship.

29 November: Five players were dispensed after a bad campaign in 2012 season, they are: Leandro, João Vitor, Daniel Carvalho, Obina and Betinho. And other eleven players who still have links with the club, but were not utilized by the coach Gilson Kleina: Pegorari, Carlos, Fabinho Capixaba, Luís Felipe, Gerley, Leandro Amaro, Wellington, Tinga, Patrik, Daniel Lovinho and Tadeu.

3 December: Four more players were dispensed, following the redesign plan for 2013 season: Artur, Adalberto Román, Corrêa and Thiago Heleno.

== Competitions ==
=== Friendlies ===
Palmeiras' first match in 2012 was a friendly at home against Ajax on 14 January.

14 January	Palmeiras (Brazil)	1–0	(Netherlands) Ajax	São Paulo
17:00 UTC−02:00	Marcos Assunção (yellow card); Pedro Carmona 90+4'	Report	Enoh (yellow card); Vertonghen (yellow card); Alderweireld (yellow card); Bouy (yellow card)	Stadium: Estádio Municipal Paulo Machado de Carvalho (Pacaembu); Attendance: 25,432; Referee: Marcelo Aparecido de Souza

==== Marcos last game ====
Marcos final game with Palmeiras shirt, will be a friendly between the 1999 Copa Libertadores champion team versus 2002 FIFA World Cup champion team.

11 December	1999 Palmeiras Libertadores team (Brazil)	2–2	2002 Brazil World Cup team	São Paulo
22:00 UTC−02:00	Marcos 21' (pen.); Paulo Nunes 41'	Report (in Portuguese)	61' Edílson; 69' Luizão	Stadium: Estádio Municipal Paulo Machado de Carvalho (Pacaembu); Attendance: 38,000; Referee: Ana Paula Oliveira (São Paulo)

=== Campeonato Paulista ===
==== First round ====
Pos	Team	Pld	W	D	L	GF	GA	GD	Pts	Qualification or relegation
3	Santos	19	12	3	4	46	18	+28	39	Advanced to the Knockout stage
4	Guarani	19	11	3	5	26	18	+8	36	Advanced to the Knockout stage
5	Palmeiras	19	10	6	3	37	24	+13	36	Advanced to the Knockout stage
6	Mogi Mirim	19	10	5	4	32	22	+10	35	Advanced to the Knockout stage
7	Bragantino	19	8	5	6	33	33	0	29	Advanced to the Knockout stage

Updated to match(es) played on 15 April 2012. Source: Futpédia and UOL Esporte
Rules for classification: 1st points; 2nd goal difference; 3rd number of goals scored; 4th less red cards; 5th less yellow cards; 6th raffle;

Win Draw Loss

22 January 1	Bragantino	1–2	Palmeiras	Bragança Paulista
17:00 UTC−02:00	Wellington (yellow card) 13', (goal) 60' (pen.); Murilo Henrique (yellow card) 26'; Astorga (yellow card) 52'; Luiz Henrique (yellow card) 57'; Serginho (yellow card) 74'; Júnior Lopes (yellow card) 89'	Report	6', (yellow card) 76' Leandro Amaro; (yellow card) 59' Cicinho; 84' Maikon Leite; (yellow card) 90' Henrique	Stadium: Estádio Nabi Abi Chedid; Attendance: 8,180; Referee: Leandro Bizzio Marinho (São Paulo)

25 January 2	Palmeiras	1–1	Portuguesa	São Paulo
21:50 UTC−02:00	Ricardo Bueno 80'; Henrique (yellow card) 87'	Report	49', (yellow card) 50' Maylson	Stadium: Estádio Municipal Paulo Machado de Carvalho (Pacaembu); Attendance: 7,993; Referee: Leonardo Ferreira Lima (São Paulo)

29 January 3	Catanduvense	1–1	Palmeiras	Catanduva
17:00 UTC−02:00	Cléber (yellow card) 63'; Osny 73' (pen.)	Report	83' Fernandão	Stadium: Estádio Municipal Sílvio Salles; Referee: Luiz Vanderlei Martinucho (São Paulo)

1 February 4	Palmeiras	2–0	Mogi Mirim	São Paulo
22:00 UTC−02:00	Marcos Assunção 2', 87'; Leandro Amaro (yellow card) 49'	Report	(yellow card) 14' Baraka	Stadium: Estádio Municipal Paulo Machado de Carvalho (Pacaembu); Attendance: 3,551; Referee: Antônio Rogério Batista do Prado (São Paulo)

5 February 5	Santos	1–2	Palmeiras	Presidente Prudente
17:00 UTC−02:00	Neymar (yellow card) 68', (goal) 70'; Ibson (yellow card) 76' (yellow-red card) 86'; Pará (yellow card) 78'	Report	88' Fernandão; 90+1' Juninho	Stadium: Estádio Eduardo José Farah (Prudentão); Referee: Luiz Flávio de Oliveira (São Paulo)

8 February 6	Palmeiras	3–2	XV de Piracicaba	São Paulo
21:50 UTC−02:00	Daniel Carvalho 15'; Marcos Assunção 47'; Artur 72'	Report	31' Ricardinho; (yellow card) 35' Gláuber; (yellow card) 42' Alex Cazumba; (yellow card) 59' Marcus Vinícius; 71' (o.g.) Maurício Ramos	Stadium: Estádio Municipal Paulo Machado de Carvalho (Pacaembu); Attendance: 7,352; Referee: Rodrigo Braghetto (São Paulo)

11 February 7	Palmeiras	3–0	Ituano	São Paulo
17:00 UTC−02:00	Patrik 7'; Barcos 22'; Cicinho (yellow card) 44'; Artur 67', (yellow card) 86'	Report	(yellow card) 63' Kleiton Domingues	Stadium: Estádio Municipal Paulo Machado de Carvalho (Pacaembu); Attendance: 11,704; Referee: Edson Reis Pavani Junior (São Paulo)

17 February 8	Guaratinguetá	2–3	Palmeiras	Guaratinguetá
21:00 UTC−02:00	Pio 10', 90+3'; Fernando (yellow card) 38'; Daniel (red card) 45+1'; Djavan (yellow card) 66'; Baggio (red card) 76'	Report	18' Artur; (yellow card) 34', (goal) 86' João Vitor; 45+2' (pen.), (yellow card) 57' Barcos; (yellow card) 59' Juninho; (yellow card) 60' Marcos Assunção; (yellow card) 87' Henrique	Stadium: Estádio Professor Dario Rodrigues Leite; Attendance: 7,002; Referee: Flavio Rodrigues Guerra (São Paulo)

23 February 9	Palmeiras	1–1	Oeste	São Paulo
19:30 UTC−02:00	Román (yellow card) 38'; Maikon Leite 40'; Marcos Assunção (yellow card) 51'	Report	11' (pen.) Mazinho; (yellow card) 32' Dionísio; (yellow card) 57' Paulo Vítor; (yellow card) 85' Wanderson	Stadium: Estádio Municipal Paulo Machado de Carvalho (Pacaembu); Attendance: 9,478; Referee: Marcelo Prieto Alfieri (São Paulo)

26 February 10	Palmeiras	3–3	São Paulo	Presidente Prudente
16:00 UTC−02:00	Daniel Carvalho 5'; Barcos 37', 71'; Marcos Assunção (yellow card) 66'; Henrique (yellow card) 85'	Report	30' Cícero; 54' (pen.) Willian José; (yellow card) 71' Paulo Miranda; 75' Fernandinho; (yellow card) 89' Rodrigo Caio	Stadium: Estádio Eduardo José Farah (Prudentão); Attendance: 19,161; Referee: Wilson Seneme (São Paulo)

29 February 11	Linense	1–3	Palmeiras	Lins
22:00 UTC−02:00	Alexandre Silva (yellow card) 31'; Pablo (yellow card) 44'; Elias (yellow card) 58'; André Luiz 71'	Report	1' Maikon Leite; (yellow card) 3' Leandro Amaro; (yellow card) 25' Márcio Araújo; 32' Barcos; 35' Daniel Carvalho; (yellow card) 76' Patrik; (yellow card) 82' Artur	Stadium: Estádio Municipal Gilberto Siqueira Lopes; Referee: Fábio de Jesus Volpato Mendes (São Paulo)

4 March 12	Palmeiras	0–0	São Caetano	São Paulo
16:00 UTC−02:00	Henrique (yellow card) 50'; Valdivia (yellow card) 83'; Cicinho (yellow card) 90+1'	Report	(yellow card) 69' Augusto Recife; (yellow card) 79' Aílton; (yellow card) 84' Geovane; (yellow card) 85' Moradei; (yellow card) 88' Marcone	Stadium: Estádio Municipal Paulo Machado de Carvalho (Pacaembu); Attendance: 19,437; Referee: Antonio Rogério Batista do Prado (São Paulo)

11 March 13	Botafogo-SP	2–6	Palmeiras	Ribeirão Preto
16:00 UTC−02:00	Murilo Ceará (yellow card) 16'; Marquinhos (yellow card) 55' (yellow-red card) 59'; Alessandro 77', (yellow card) 83'; Marcos Aurélio 87'; Juninho (red card) 90+2'	Report	23' Valdivia; (yellow card) 34', (goal) 36' Maikon Leite; 54', 90+4' (pen.) Barcos; 80' Ricardo Bueno; 90+1' Juninho	Stadium: Estádio Santa Cruz; Attendance: 17,946; Referee: Vinicius Gonçalves Dias Araújo (São Paulo)

18 March 14	Palmeiras	2–1	Ponte Preta	São Paulo
18:30 UTC−02:00	Juninho 3'; Marcos Assunção 11'; Artur (yellow card) 66'	Report	37' Ferron; (yellow card) 52' Agenor; (yellow card) 77' João Paulo	Stadium: Estádio Municipal Paulo Machado de Carvalho (Pacaembu); Attendance: 19,152; Referee: Flávio Rodrigues de Souza (São Paulo)

25 March 15	Corinthians	2–1	Palmeiras	São Paulo
16:00 UTC−02:00	Liédson (yellow card) 25'; Chicão (yellow card) 35'; Paulinho 48'; Emerson (yellow card) 90+1'	Report	17', (yellow card) 71' Marcos Assunção; (yellow card) 42', 51' (o.g.) Márcio Araújo; (yellow card) 65' Henrique; (yellow card) 81' Ricardo Bueno	Stadium: Estádio Municipal Paulo Machado de Carvalho (Pacaembu); Attendance: 29,284; Referee: Marcelo Rogério (São Paulo)

28 March 16	Paulista	0–1	Palmeiras	Jundiaí
22:00 UTC−02:00	Diogo (yellow card) 36'; Madson (yellow card) 46'; Diego Barboza (yellow card) 65'	Report	(yellow card) 33' Juninho; (yellow card) 45' Maurício Ramos; (yellow card) 74' Daniel Carvalho; (yellow card) 83' Cicinho; 87' João Vitor	Stadium: Estádio Jayme Cintra; Referee: Demetrius Pinto Candançan (São Paulo)

1 April 17	Palmeiras	0–1	Mirassol	Mirassol
18:30 UTC−02:00	Juninho (yellow card) 90'	Report	(yellow card) 53' Henrique Dias; 68' Preto; (yellow card) 83' Fernando Leal	Stadium: Estádio Municipal Paulo Machado de Carvalho (Pacaembu); Attendance: 8,989; Referee: Márcio Roberto Soares (São Paulo)

8 April 18	Guarani	3–1	Palmeiras	Campinas
16:00 UTC−02:00	Neto 15', (yellow card) 17'; Fumagalli 24', (yellow card) 26'; Bruno Mendes 56'; Fábio Bahia (yellow card) 75'; Fabinho Souza (yellow card) 77'; Max Santos (yellow card) 88'; Domingos (yellow card) 90'	Report	18' Barcos; (yellow card) 22' Gerley; (yellow card) 29' João Vitor; (red card) 62' Cicinho; (yellow card) 83' Márcio Araújo; (yellow card) 90+2' Patrik	Stadium: Estádio Brinco de Ouro; Attendance: 9,399; Referee: Rodrigo Guarizo Ferreira do Amaral (São Paulo)

15 April 19	Palmeiras	2–2	Comercial-SP	São Paulo
16:00 UTC−02:00	Henrique (yellow card) 37', (goal) 90+2'; Marcos Assunção (yellow card) 41'; Fernandão 87'; Leandro Amaro (yellow card) 89'	Report	(yellow card) 28' Leandro; 36', 90' Diogo Acosta; (yellow card) 45+2', (red card) 48' Marcelo Labarthe; (yellow card) 47' Marcel; (red card) 52' Leandro Camilo; (yellow card) 54' Jeffinho; (yellow card) 75' Henrique Motta; (yellow card) 81' Alex; (yellow card) 85' Marcelo Ferreira	Stadium: Estádio Municipal Paulo Machado de Carvalho (Pacaembu); Attendance: 5,758; Referee: José Claudio Rocha Filho (São Paulo)

==== Quarterfinals ====
22 April Quarterfinals	Guarani	3–2	Palmeiras	Campinas
18:30 UTC−03:00	Bruno Recife (yellow card) 22'; Wilian Favoni (yellow card) 32'; Fumagalli 50'; Fabinho Souza 52', 90'	Report	(yellow card) 10' Maurício Ramos; (yellow card) 24' João Vitor; (yellow card) 51' Barcos; 53' Marcos Assunção; (yellow card) 81' Fernandão; (yellow card) 81' Márcio Araújo; 90+3' Henrique; (yellow card) 90+4' Juninho	Stadium: Brinco de Ouro; Attendance: 15,005; Referee: Vinicius Furlan (São Paulo)

Source: Palmeiras.com.br (Portuguese)

=== Copa do Brasil ===
==== First round ====
14 March 1st leg	Coruripe (Alagoas)	0–1	(São Paulo (state)) Palmeiras	Maceió
22:00 UTC−02:00	Mello (yellow card) 36'; Jota (yellow card) 51'; Juninho (yellow card) 77'	Report	2' Barcos; (yellow card) 72' Pedro Carmona	Stadium: Estádio Rei Pelé; Attendance: 10,017; Referee: Cláudio Francisco Lima e Silva (Sergipe)

22 March 2nd leg	Palmeiras (São Paulo (state))	3–0 (4–0 agg.)	(Alagoas) Coruripe	Jundiaí
19:30 UTC−02:00	Barcos (yellow card) 41', (goal) 58'; Marcos Assunção 55'; Juninho 84'	Report	(yellow card) 38' Mello	Stadium: Estádio Jayme Cintra; Attendance: 11,143; Referee: Leandro Junior Hermes (Paraná)

==== Second round ====
4 April 1st leg	Horizonte (Ceará)	1–3	(São Paulo (state)) Palmeiras	Horizonte
21:50 UTC−02:00	Mateus Gadelha 17'; Douglas (yellow card) 82'	Report	(yellow card) 29' Marcos Assunção; 34', 67' Leandro Amaro; (yellow card) 36' Juninho; (yellow card) 57' Barcos; 71' Maikon Leite	Stadium: Estádio José Domingos Neto; Attendance: 8,361; Referee: Wilton Pereira Sampaio (Goiás)
Note: Palmeiras eliminated the second leg winning the match by 2 goals difference.

==== Round of 16 ====
25 April 1st leg	Paraná (Paraná (state))	1–2	(São Paulo (state)) Palmeiras	Curitiba
21:50 UTC-03:00	Henrique Alemão (yellow card) 34'; Luisinho 38'; André Vinicius (yellow card) 64'	Report	21' Marcos Assunção; (yellow card) 25' Cicinho; 78' (pen.) Henrique; (yellow card) 90+2' Valdivia	Stadium: Vila Capanema; Attendance: 12,065; Referee: Fabrício Neves Corrêa (Rio Grande do Sul)

9 May 2nd leg	Palmeiras (São Paulo (state))	4–0 (6–1 agg.)	(Paraná (state)) Paraná	Barueri
21:50 UTC-03:00	Mazinho 26', 52'; Henrique (red card) 28'; Maurício Ramos (yellow card) 54'; Valdivia 63'; Maikon Leite 73'	Report	(yellow card) 25' Cambará; (red card) 28' Douglas; (yellow card) 47' Wellington Silva	Stadium: Arena Barueri; Attendance: 10,855; Referee: Péricles Bassols Pegado Cortez (Rio de Janeiro)

==== Quarterfinals ====
16 May 1st leg	Atlético Paranaense (Paraná (state))	2–2	(São Paulo (state)) Palmeiras	Curitiba
19:30 UTC-03:00	Bruno Mineiro 17'; Edigar 23'; Cleberson (yellow card) 43'; Deivid (yellow card) 64'	Report	22', (yellow card) 57' Barcos; (yellow card) 38' Cicinho; (yellow card) 53' Valdivia; 60' Maikon Leite	Stadium: Vila Capanema; Attendance: 7,307; Referee: Paulo Henrique de Godoy Bezerra (Santa Catarina)

23 May 2nd leg	Palmeiras (São Paulo (state))	2–0 (4–2 agg.)	(Paraná (state)) Atlético Paranaense	Barueri
19:30 UTC-03:00	João Vitor (yellow card) 45+2'; Betinho (yellow card) 51'; Luan 69'; Valdivia (yellow card) 71'; Henrique 82'	Report	(yellow card) 71' Zezinho	Stadium: Arena Barueri; Attendance: 17,574; Referee: Ricardo Marques Ribeiro (Minas Gerais)

==== Semifinals ====
13 June 1st leg	Grêmio (Rio Grande do Sul)	0–2	(São Paulo (state)) Palmeiras	Porto Alegre
21:50 UTC-03:00		Report	(yellow card) 41' Thiago Heleno; (yellow card) 50' Marcos Assunção; (yellow card) 79' João Vitor; 86' Mazinho; 90' Barcos	Stadium: Olímpico; Attendance: 43,508; Referee: Héber Roberto Lopes (Paraná)

21 June 2nd leg	Palmeiras (São Paulo (state))	1–1 (3–1 agg.)	(Rio Grande do Sul) Grêmio	Barueri
21:00 UTC-03:00	Daniel Carvalho (yellow card) 7'; Barcos (yellow card) 27'; Valdivia 72', (yellow card) 79'; Henrique (red card) 84'	Report	(yellow card) 30' Gilberto Silva; 66' Fernando; (yellow card) 77' Kléber; (red card) 79' Rondinelly; (red card) 81' Edílson; (yellow card) 81' Pará	Stadium: Arena Barueri; Attendance: 26,255; Referee: Ricardo Marques Ribeiro (Minas Gerais)

==== Finals ====
5 July 1st leg	Palmeiras (São Paulo (state))	2–0	(Paraná (state)) Coritiba	Barueri
21:50 UTC-03:00	Valdivia 45+3' (pen.), (yellow card) 49' (yellow-red card) 68'; Márcio Araújo (yellow card) 53'; Thiago Heleno 64'	Report	(yellow card) 40' Junior Urso; (yellow card) 45+1' Jonas; (yellow card) 66' Emerson; (yellow card) 87' Tcheco	Stadium: Arena Barueri; Attendance: 28,557; Referee: Wilton Pereira Sampaio (Goiás)

11 July 2nd leg	Coritiba (Paraná (state))	1–1 (1–3 agg.)	(São Paulo (state)) Palmeiras	Curitiba
21:50 UTC-03:00	Rafinha (yellow card) 10'; Ayrton 62'; Lincoln (yellow card) 74'; Pereira (yellow card) 89' (yellow-red card) 90+2'	Report	(yellow card) 4' Juninho; (yellow card) 18' João Vitor; (yellow card) 60' Artur; (yellow card) 63' Marcos Assunção; 66' Betinho; (yellow card) 72' Henrique	Stadium: Couto Pereira; Attendance: 35,122; Referee: Sandro Meira Ricci (Distrito Federal)

==== Award ====
2012 Copa do Brasil
winner

2nd title

=== Campeonato Brasileiro ===
==== Standings ====
Pos	Team	Pld	W	D	L	GF	GA	GD	Pts	Qualification or relegation
16	Portuguesa	38	10	15	13	39	41	−2	45	
17	Sport Recife	38	10	11	17	39	56	−17	41	Relegation to 2013 Série B
18	Palmeiras	38	9	7	22	39	54	−15	34	Copa Libertadores Second Stage and relegation to Série B (Note: Palmeiras qualified for the second stage of the 2013 Copa Libertadores as the 2012 Copa do Brasil champion.)
19	Atlético Goianiense	38	7	9	22	37	67	−30	30	Relegation to 2013 Série B
20	Figueirense	38	7	9	22	39	72	−33	30	Relegation to 2013 Série B

Updated to match(es) played on unknown. Source: UOL.com.br
Rules for classification: 1st points; 2nd wins; 3rd goal difference; 4th goals scored; 5th head-to-head results; 6th least red cards received; 7th least yellow cards received; 8th draw

==== Results by round ====
19 May 1	Palmeiras	1–1	Portuguesa	São Paulo
18:30 UTC-03:00	Luan 38'; João Vitor (yellow card) 90+2'	Report	(yellow card) 35' Ananias; (yellow card) 61' Luis Ricardo; (yellow card) 83' Rogério; 87' Rodrigo	Stadium: Estádio Municipal Paulo Machado de Carvalho (Pacaembu); Attendance: 8,939; Referee: Raphael Claus (São Paulo)

27 May 2	Grêmio	1–0	Palmeiras	Porto Alegre
18:30 UTC-03:00	André Lima 72'; Rondinelly (yellow card) 79'; Vilson (yellow card) 82'; Fernando (yellow card) 85'	Report	(yellow card) 73' Marcos Assunção	Stadium: Olímpico; Attendance: 22,610; Referee: Marcelo de Lima Henrique (Rio de Janeiro)

6 June 3	Sport	2–1	Palmeiras	Recife
19:30 UTC-03:00	Marquinhos Paraná 14'; Felipe Azevedo 71'	Report	37' Barcos; (yellow card) 50' Maikon Leite	Stadium: Ilha do Retiro; Attendance: 19,096; Referee: Leandro Vuaden (Rio Grande do Sul)

9 June 4	Palmeiras	0–1	Atlético Mineiro	São Paulo
21:00 UTC-03:00	Luan (yellow card) 51'; Márcio Araújo (yellow card) 58'; Henrique (yellow card) 80'	Report	(yellow card) 40' Marcos Rocha; 48', (yellow card) 60' Jô; (yellow card) 82' Pierre; (yellow card) 85' Danilinho	Stadium: Estádio Municipal Paulo Machado de Carvalho (Pacaembu); Attendance: 7,268; Referee: Márcio Chagas da Silva (Rio Grande do Sul)

17 June 5	Palmeiras	1–1	Vasco	Barueri
16:00 UTC-03:00	Thiago Heleno (yellow card) 32'; Mazinho 55'; Juninho (yellow card) 59'; Henrique (yellow card) 61'	Report	(yellow card) 37' Nílton; (yellow card) 73' Felipe; 82' Juninho Pernambucano	Stadium: Arena Barueri; Attendance: 6,651; Referee: Leandro Pedro Vuaden (Rio Grande do Sul)

24 June 6	Corinthians	2–1	Palmeiras	São Paulo
16:00 UTC-03:00	Romarinho 33', 55'; Douglas (yellow card) 57'; Liédson (yellow card) 81'	Report	3' Mazinho; (yellow card) 29' João Vitor; (yellow card) 46' Valdivia; (yellow card) 47' Cicinho; (yellow card) 90+2' Márcio Araújo	Stadium: Estádio Municipal Paulo Machado de Carvalho (Pacaembu); Attendance: 17,519; Referee: Luiz Flávio de Oliveira (São Paulo)

1 July 7	Palmeiras	3–1	Figueirense	Barueri
18:30 UTC-03:00	Román 38'; Barcos 83'; Maikon Leite 86'	Report	(yellow card) 29' Caio; 31' Júlio César; (yellow card) 54' Túlio; (yellow card) 79' Aloísio	Stadium: Arena Barueri; Attendance: 2,580; Referee: Francisco Carlos Nascimento (Alagoas)

8 July 8	Ponte Preta	1–0	Palmeiras	Campinas
18:30 UTC-03:00	Ricardinho 15', (yellow card) 64'; Édson Bastos (yellow card) 64'; Gerônimo (yellow card) 89'	Report	(yellow card) 15' Román; (yellow card) 33' Luiz Gustavo; (yellow card) 49' João Denoni; (yellow card) 90+1' Maikon Leite	Stadium: Moisés Lucarelli; Attendance: 5,271; Referee: Marcelo Aparecido Ribeiro de Souza (São Paulo)

15 July 9	Palmeiras	1–1	São Paulo	Barueri
18:30 UTC-03:00	Henrique (yellow card) 8' (yellow-red card); Maikon Leite (yellow card) 49'; Cicinho (yellow card) 75'; Mazinho 81'; João Vitor (yellow card) 90+2'	Report	12' Luis Fabiano; (yellow card) 56' Toloi; (yellow card) 65' Denílson; (yellow card) 70' Osvaldo	Stadium: Arena Barueri; Attendance: 8,374; Referee: Péricles Bassols Pegado Cortez (Rio de Janeiro)

19 July 10	Coritiba	1–1	Palmeiras	Curitiba
21:00 UTC-03:00	Lucas Mendes (yellow card) 13'; Éverton Ribeiro (yellow card) 60'; Anderson Aquino 67'; Lincoln (yellow card) 83'; Pereira (red card) 90'	Report	5' Patrik; (yellow card) 22' Wellington; (yellow card) 39' Juninho; (yellow card) 64' Mazinho	Stadium: Couto Pereira; Attendance: 11,998; Referee: Ricardo Marques Ribeiro (Minas Gerais)

22 July 11	Palmeiras	3–0	Náutico	Barueri
16:00 UTC-03:00	Obina 18'; Cicinho (yellow card) 22'; Mazinho 29'; Márcio Araújo 50'	Report	(yellow card) 15' Lúcio	Stadium: Arena Barueri; Attendance: 7,407; Referee: Edivaldo Elias da Silva (Paraná)

26 July 12	Palmeiras	0–2	Bahia	Barueri
21:00 UTC-03:00	Daniel Carvalho (yellow card) 21'; Leandro Amaro (yellow card) 28'; João Vitor (yellow card) 38'; Juninho (yellow card) 72'	Report	(yellow card) 20' Zé Roberto; (yellow card) 39' Gil Bahia; (yellow card) 58' Hélder; (yellow card) 65' Ciro; 68' (pen.), 82' Souza; (yellow card) 71' Fahel; (yellow card) 89' Danny Morais	Stadium: Arena Barueri; Attendance: 7,515; Referee: Antônio Frederico de Carvalho Schneider (Rio de Janeiro)

29 July 13	Cruzeiro	2–1	Palmeiras	Belo Horizonte
18:30 UTC-03:00	Borges 36' (pen.), 55'; Victorino (yellow card) 67'; Willian Magrão (yellow card) 90+1'	Report	(yellow card) 37' João Vitor; (yellow card) 46' Daniel Carvalho; 68' (pen.), (yellow card) 74' Barcos; (yellow card) 82' Leandro Amaro	Stadium: Independência; Attendance: 11,512; Referee: Fabrício Neves Corrêa (Rio Grande do Sul)

4 August 14	Palmeiras	0–1	Internacional	Barueri
18:30 UTC-03:00	João Vitor (yellow card) 52'	Report	(yellow card) 28' Elton; 34', (yellow card) 62' Ygor; (yellow card) 53' Índio	Stadium: Arena Barueri; Attendance: 8,387; Referee: Jaílson Macedo Freitas (Bahia)

8 August 15	Botafogo	1–2	Palmeiras	Rio de Janeiro
21:50 UTC-03:00	Andrézinho 57'	Report	14', 72' Barcos; (yellow card) 66' Leandro Amaro	Stadium: Engenhão; Attendance: 3,550; Referee: Francisco Carlos Nascimento (Alagoas)

12 August 16	Fluminense	1–0	Palmeiras	Rio de Janeiro
18:30 UTC-03:00	Jean 84'	Report	(yellow card) 35' Obina	Stadium: Engenhão; Attendance: 6,079; Referee: Márcio Chagas da Silva (Rio Grande do Sul)

15 August 17	Palmeiras	1–0	Flamengo	Barueri
21:50 UTC-03:00	Patrik (yellow card) 6'; Maurício Ramos (yellow card) 28'; Barcos 31', (yellow card) 76'; Artur (yellow card) 37'; Thiago Heleno (yellow card) 45'; Henrique (yellow card) 66'; Juninho (yellow card) 73'; Obina (yellow card) 88'	Report	(yellow card) 8' (yellow-red card) 29' Ibson; (yellow card) 38' Marllon; (yellow card) 40' Thomás; (yellow card) 71' Renato; (yellow card) 90+4' Mattheus	Stadium: Arena Barueri; Attendance: 7,500; Referee: Célio Amorim (Santa Catarina)

19 August 18	Atlético Goianiense	2–1	Palmeiras	Goiânia
18:30 UTC-03:00	Eron 18'; Patric (yellow card) 41'; Rayllan 79'	Report	(yellow card) 19' Maurício Ramos; 24' Barcos; (yellow card) 41' Thiago Heleno	Stadium: Serra Dourada; Attendance: 9,955; Referee: Sandro Meira Ricci (Distrito Federal)

25 August 19	Palmeiras	1–2	Santos	São Paulo
18:30 UTC-03:00	Corrêa 40'; João Vitor (yellow card) 52'; Valdivia (yellow card) 61'; Maurício Ramos (yellow card) 89'	Report	43', 62' Neymar; (yellow card) 53' Adriano	Stadium: Estádio Municipal Paulo Machado de Carvalho (Pacaembu); Attendance: 21,171; Referee: Guilherme Ceretta de Lima (São Paulo)

29 August 20	Portuguesa	3–0	Palmeiras	São Paulo
20:30 UTC-03:00	Boquita (yellow card) 10'; Ananias (yellow card) 42'; Moisés (yellow card) 46', (goal) 84'; Bruno Mineiro 49', 70'; Ferdinando (yellow card) 63'	Report	(yellow card) 43' Valdivia; (yellow card) 45' Thiago Heleno; (yellow card) 46' Henrique; (yellow card) 53' Leandro Amaro	Stadium: Canindé; Attendance: 7,531; Referee: Wilson Seneme (São Paulo)

1 September 21	Palmeiras	0–0	Grêmio	São Paulo
18:30 UTC-03:00	Luan (yellow card) 28'; Tiago Real (yellow card) 37'; Maikon Leite (yellow card) 73'; Barcos (yellow card) 81'; Corrêa (yellow card) 90+4'	Report	(yellow card) 13' (yellow-red card) 18' Kléber; (yellow card) 44' Marcelo Moreno; (yellow card) 45' Naldo; (yellow card) 56' André Lima; (yellow card) 82' Marquinhos	Stadium: Estádio Municipal Paulo Machado de Carvalho (Pacaembu); Attendance: 12,035; Referee: Sandro Meira Ricci (Distrito Federal)

6 September 22	Palmeiras	3–1	Sport	São Paulo
21:00 UTC-03:00	Henrique (yellow card) 37'; Thiago Heleno (yellow card) 40'; João Vitor (yellow card) 44'; Corrêa 52'; Tiago Real 62'; Obina 67'	Report	(yellow card) 26' Willian Rocha; (yellow card) 30', (goal) 61' Rivaldo; (yellow card) 35' Hugo; (yellow card) 85' Diego Ivo	Stadium: Estádio Municipal Paulo Machado de Carvalho (Pacaembu); Attendance: 29,409; Referee: Marcelo de Lima Henrique (Rio de Janeiro)

9 September 23	Atlético Mineiro	3–0	Palmeiras	Belo Horizonte
18:30 UTC-03:00	Guilherme (yellow card) 15'; Leonardo Silva 52'; Bernard 83', 90+2'; Pierre (yellow card) 89'	Relatório	(yellow card) 13' Thiago Heleno; (yellow card) 22' Valdivia; (yellow card) 58' João Vitor	Stadium: Independência; Attendance: 18,033; Referee: Leandro Pedro Vuaden (Rio Grande do Sul)

12 September 24	Vasco	3–1	Palmeiras	Rio de Janeiro
22:00 UTC-03:00	Jhon Cley (yellow card) 22'; Tenorio 29'; Nílton 51', (yellow card) 76'; Alecsandro (yellow card) 60'; Juninho Pernambucano 71'; Felipe (yellow card) 85'; Douglas (yellow card) 89'	Report	23' Luan; (yellow card) 82' Wellington	Stadium: São Januário; Attendance: 3,904; Referee: Wilton Pereira Sampaio (Goiás)

16 September 25	Palmeiras	0–2	Corinthians	São Paulo
16:00 UTC-03:00	Luan (yellow card) 17' (yellow-red card) 25'; Barcos (yellow card) 29'; Artur (yellow card) 35'; Obina (yellow card) 81'	Report	21', (yellow card) 23' Romarinho; (yellow card) 31' Martínez; (yellow card) 33' Cássio; (yellow card) 46' Ralf; 53' Paulinho; (yellow card) 68' Danilo; (yellow card) 82' Fábio Santos; (yellow card) 90+3' Guilherme Andrade	Stadium: Estádio Municipal Paulo Machado de Carvalho (Pacaembu); Attendance: 26,068; Referee: Marcelo Aparecido de Souza (São Paulo)

22 September 26	Figueirense	1–3	Palmeiras	Florianópolis
18:30 UTC-03:00	Helder (yellow card) 19'; Elsinho (yellow card) 55'; Aloísio 64'; Claudinei (yellow card) 74'; João Paulo (yellow card) 80'	Report	(yellow card) 4' Valdivia; 7' Thiago Heleno; 9' Henrique; (yellow card) 33' Maurício Ramos; (yellow card) 43' Barcos; (yellow card) 45+1' Juninho; (yellow card) 47' Maikon Leite; 67' Marcos Assunção	Stadium: Orlando Scarpelli; Attendance: 10,724; Referee: Wilton Pereira Sampaio (Goiás)

29 September 27	Palmeiras	3–0	Ponte Preta	São Paulo
21:00 UTC-03:00	Barcos 12', 14'; Maikon Leite (yellow card) 24'; Thiago Heleno (yellow card) 39'; Marcos Assunção 59'; Maurício Ramos (yellow card) 64'; Artur (yellow card) 67'	Report	(yellow card) 39' Roger	Stadium: Estádio Municipal Paulo Machado de Carvalho (Pacaembu); Attendance: 30,942; Referee: Guilherme Ceretta de Lima (São Paulo)

6 October 28	São Paulo	3–0	Palmeiras	São Paulo
16:00 UTC-03:00	Luis Fabiano 35', 69'; Wellington (yellow card) 39'; Denílson 42'; Lucas (yellow card) 73'	Report	(yellow card) 15' (yellow-red card) 53' Artur; (yellow card) 46' Román; (yellow card) 65' Henrique	Stadium: Morumbi; Attendance: 34,941; Referee: Paulo César de Oliveira (São Paulo)

11 October 29	Palmeiras	0–1	Coritiba	Araraquara^{1}
21:00 UTC-03:00	Henrique (yellow card) 14'; Obina (yellow card) 28'; João Denoni (yellow card) 76'; Daniel Carvalho (yellow card) 83'; Thiago Heleno (yellow card) 86'; Maurício Ramos (yellow card) 87'	Report	(yellow card) 18' Willian; (yellow card) 49' Luccas Claro; (yellow card) 60' Lincoln; (yellow card) 61' Éverton Ribeiro; 88' (pen.) Deivid	Stadium: Fonte Luminosa; Attendance: 10,655; Referee: Jaílson Macedo Freitas (Bahia)

14 October 30	Náutico	1–0	Palmeiras	Recife
16:00 UTC-03:00	Kieza 13'; Martinez (yellow card) 41'; Alessandro (yellow card) 58'; Douglas Santos (yellow card) 71'	Report	(yellow card) 27' (red card) 62' Thiago Heleno; (yellow card) 29' Leandro Amaro; (yellow card) 63' Juninho; (yellow card) 77' Patrick Vieira	Stadium: Aflitos; Attendance: 15,096; Referee: Marcelo de Lima Henrique (Rio de Janeiro)

17 October 31	Bahia	0–1	Palmeiras	Salvador
19:30 UTC-03:00	Jones (yellow card) 40'; Danny Morais (yellow card) 66'	Report	19' Betinho; (yellow card) 69' João Denoni; (yellow card) 70' Marcos Assunção; (yellow card) 78' Bruno	Stadium: Pituaçu; Attendance: 18,459; Referee: Leandro Pedro Vuaden (Rio Grande do Sul)

20 October 32	Palmeiras	2–0	Cruzeiro	Araraquara^{1}
18:30 UTC-03:00	Maurício Ramos (yellow card) 74'; Barcos 66', 71'	Report	(yellow card) 38' Willian Magrão; (yellow card) 59' Anselmo Ramon; (yellow card) 65' Everton; (yellow card) 79' Thiago Carvalho	Stadium: Fonte Luminosa; Attendance: 9,873; Referee: Marcelo de Lima Henrique (Rio de Janeiro)

27 October 33	Internacional	2–1	Palmeiras	Porto Alegre
16:20 UTC-02:00	Fred 34', (yellow card) 69'; Rafael Moura 54'; Josimar (yellow card) 70'; Muriel (yellow card) 83'; Forlán (yellow card) 90+1'; D'Alessandro (yellow card) 90+3'	Report	21' Luan; (yellow card) 77' Maurício Ramos; (yellow card) 86' Henrique	Stadium: Beira-Rio; Attendance: 9,390; Referee: Francisco Carlos Nascimento (Alagoas)

4 November 34	Palmeiras	2–2	Botafogo	Araraquara^{1}
17:00 UTC-02:00	Barcos 28', 90'	Report	21' Lodeiro; 63' Elkeson; (yellow card) 82' Gabriel; (yellow card) 88' Andrézinho	Stadium: Fonte Luminosa; Attendance: 13,228; Referee: Elmo Alves Resende Cunha (Goiás)

11 November 35	Palmeiras	2–3	Fluminense	Presidente Prudente^{1}
17:00 UTC-02:00	Barcos 60'; Luan (yellow card) 62'; Patrick Vieira 64'; João Denoni (yellow card) 76'	Report	45', 87' Fred; 53' (o.g.) Maurício Ramos; (yellow card) 83' Jean; (yellow card) 90+1' Carlinhos	Stadium: Prudentão; Attendance: 8,461; Referee: Leandro Vuaden (Rio Grande do Sul)

18 November 36	Flamengo	1–1	Palmeiras	Volta Redonda
17:00 UTC-02:00	Amaral (yellow card) 78'; Paulo Sérgio (red card) 84'; Vágner Love 88'	Report	(yellow card) 28' Márcio Araújo; (yellow card) 60' Corrêa; 62' Vinícius; (yellow card) 71' Barcos; (yellow card) 85' Román	Stadium: Raulino de Oliveira; Attendance: 10,623; Referee: André Luiz de Freitas Castro (Goiás)

25 November 37	Palmeiras	1–2	Atlético Goianiense	São Paulo
17:00 UTC-02:00	Patrick Vieira 25'; Juninho (yellow card) 29'; Mazinho (yellow card) 43'; Wellington (red card) 75'; Obina (yellow card) 81'	Report	16' Rayllan; (yellow card) 22' Diogo Campos; 57', (yellow card) 78' Ernandes; (yellow card) 69' Marino; (yellow card) 76' Eron	Stadium: Estádio Municipal Paulo Machado de Carvalho (Pacaembu); Attendance: 4,569; Referee: Márcio Chagas da Silva (Rio Grande do Sul)

1 December 38	Santos	3–1	Palmeiras	Santos
19:30 UTC-02:00	Victor Andrade 12'; Neymar 22' (pen.), 39'; Alan Santos (yellow card) 25' (yellow-red card) 55'	Report	4' Maikon Leite; (yellow card) 18' (yellow-red card) 21' Román	Stadium: Vila Belmiro; Attendance: 11,641; Referee: Guilherme Ceretta de Lima (São Paulo)

- Note 1: Palmeiras was punished with the loss of four home field matches.

Source: Palmeiras.com.br (Portuguese)

=== Copa Sudamericana ===
The draw will be held on 29 June 2012 (postponed from original date of 26 June), 12:00 UTC−04:00 at CONMEBOL's Convention Center in Luque, Paraguay.

==== Second round ====
1 August 1st leg	Palmeiras (Brazil)	2–0	(Brazil) Botafogo	Barueri
21:50 UTC-03:00	Barcos 46', 65'; João Vitor (yellow card) 83'	Report at the Wayback Machine (archived 2014-10-23)	(yellow card) 43' Renato	Stadium: Arena Barueri; Referee: Héber Roberto Lopes (Brazil)

22 August 2nd leg	Botafogo (Brazil)	3–1 (3–3 agg.)	(Brazil) Palmeiras	Rio de Janeiro
22:00 UTC-03:00	Seedorf 34'; Renato 56'; Lodeiro 72'; Jeferson (yellow card) 87'	Report at the Wayback Machine (archived 2014-10-23)	(yellow card) 38', (goal) 43' Patrik; (yellow card) 60' Juninho; (yellow card) 65' Román	Stadium: Engenhão; Referee: Leandro Vuaden (Brazil)
Note: Palmeiras advance to the next round by the away goal rule.

==== Round of 16 ====
2 October 1st leg	Palmeiras (Brazil)	3–1	(Colombia) Millonarios	Barueri
21:45 UTC-03:00	Obina 12'; Román (yellow card) 16'; Tiago Real 53'; Luan 87'	Report	(yellow card) 4' Torres; (yellow card) 60' Ramírez; (yellow card) 67' Cosme; 84' (o.g.) Artur	Stadium: Arena Barueri; Attendance: 6,549; Referee: Patricio Loustau (Argentina)

23 October 2nd leg	Millonarios (Colombia)	3–0 (4–3 agg.)	(Brazil) Palmeiras	Bogotá
19:45 UTC-05:00	Ortíz 34'; Torres (yellow card) 35'; Rentería 60' (pen.); Ochoa 76'; Vásquez (yellow card) 85'	Report	(yellow card) 62' Patrik; (yellow card) 66' Luan; (yellow card) 82' (yellow-red card) 84' Betinho	Stadium: El Campín; Referee: Víctor Hugo Carrillo (Peru)

=== Overall statistics ===
As of 1 December 2012

Games played	74 (38 Campeonato Brasileiro, 20 Campeonato Paulista, 11 Copa do Brasil, 4 Copa Sul-Americana, 1 Friendly)
Games won	30 (9 Campeonato Brasileiro, 10 Campeonato Paulista, 7 Copa do Brasil, 2 Copa Sul-Americana, 1 Friendly)
Games drawn	16 (7 Campeonato Brasileiro, 6 Campeonato Paulista, 3 Copa do Brasil, 0 Copa Sul-Americana)
Games lost	28 (22 Campeonato Brasileiro, 4 Campeonato Paulista, 0 Copa do Brasil, 2 Copa Sul-Americana)
Goals scored	108
Goals conceded	97
Goal difference	+11 (–15 Campeonato Brasileiro, +18 Campeonato Paulista, +17 Copa do Brasil, –1 Copa Sul-Americana, +1 Friendly)
Average GF per game	2.13
Average GA per game	1.00
Clean sheets	17
Best result	6–2 (vs. Botafogo-SP) (Away) - Campeonato Paulista - 11 March
Worst result	0–3 (vs. Portuguesa) (Away) - Campeonato Brasileiro - 29 August; 0–3 (vs. São Paulo) (Away) - Campeonato Brasileiro - 6 October; 0–3 (vs. Millonarios) (Away) - Copa Sudamericana - 23 October
Most Appearances	Márcio Araújo (15)
Yellow cards	193
Red cards	11
Average YC per game	1.73
Average RC per game	0.00
Top scorer	Hernán Barcos (28 goals)
Top assistor	Marcos Assunção (7)
Most clean sheets	Deola (6)
Worst discipline	Henrique (17 (yellow card) , 4 (red card) )

== Players ==
=== Squad information ===
As of 4 September 2012

Note: Flags indicate national team as defined under FIFA eligibility rules; some limited exceptions apply. Players may hold more than one non-FIFA nationality.

No.	Pos.	Nation	Player
1	GK	BRA	Bruno
2	DF	BRA	Artur
3	DF	BRA	Henrique
4	DF	BRA	Thiago Heleno
5	DF	PAR	Adalberto Román
6	DF	BRA	Juninho
7	FW	BRA	Maikon Leite
8	MF	BRA	Márcio Araújo
9	FW	ARG	Hernán Barcos
10	MF	CHI	Jorge Valdivia (vice-captain)
11	FW	BRA	Luan
13	DF	BRA	Leandro Amaro
14	DF	BRA	Luiz Gustavo
15	DF	BRA	Maurício Ramos
16	MF	BRA	João Vitor
17	FW	BRA	Mazinho (on loan from Oeste)
18	MF	BRA	Patrik
19	MF	BRA	Daniel Carvalho (on loan from Atlético Mineiro)
20	MF	BRA	Marcos Assunção (captain)
21	FW	BRA	Obina (on loan from Shandong Luneng)
22	GK	BRA	Raphael Alemão

No.	Pos.	Nation	Player
23	MF	BRA	Tiago Real
25	FW	BRA	Betinho
26	DF	BRA	Fernandinho (on loan from Oeste)
27	DF	BRA	Wellington
32	FW	BRA	Caio
33	DF	BRA	Leandro
38	MF	BRA	João Denoni
39	MF	BRA	Patrick Vieira
44	DF	BRA	Fabinho Capixaba
45	FW	BRA	Vinícius
47	GK	BRA	Fábio
49	FW	BRA	Emerson
77	DF	BRA	Corrêa
87	MF	BRA	Wesley
–	GK	BRA	Pegorari
–	GK	BRA	Carlos
–	FW	BRA	Daniel Lovinho
–	FW	BRA	Tadeu
–	MF	BRA	Tinga

Source: Palmeiras.com.br

Note: Sixteen players were dispensed after the end of the season: Leandro, João Vitor, Daniel Carvalho, Obina, Betinho, Pegorari, Carlos, Fabinho Capixaba, Luís Felipe, Gerley, Leandro Amaro, Wellington, Tinga, Patrik, Daniel Lovinho and Tadeu.

=== Squad statistics ===
As of 17 March 2012

No.	Pos	Nat	Player	Total		Brasileiro		Paulista		Copa do Brasil		Sul-Americana	
No.	Pos	Nat	Player	Apps	Goals	Apps	Goals	Apps	Goals	Apps	Goals	Apps	Goals
1	GK	(Brazil) BRA	Bruno	2	0	0+0	0	2+0	0	0+0	0	0+0	0
2	DF	(Brazil) BRA	Cicinho	10	0	0+0	0	9+1	0	0+0	0	0+0	0
3	DF	(Brazil) BRA	Henrique	13	0	0+0	0	12+0	0	1+0	0	0+0	0
4	DF	(Brazil) BRA	Thiago Heleno	0	0	0+0	0	0+0	0	0+0	0	0+0	0
5	DF	(Paraguay) PAR	Adalberto Román	2	0	0+0	0	1+1	0	0+0	0	0+0	0
6	DF	(Brazil) BRA	Juninho	13	2	0+0	0	12+0	2	1+0	0	0+0	0
7	FW	(Brazil) BRA	Maikon Leite	13	4	0+0	0	9+3	4	1+0	0	0+0	0
8	MF	(Brazil) BRA	Márcio Araújo	14	0	0+0	0	13+0	0	1+0	0	0+0	0
9	FW	(Brazil) BRA	Ricardo Bueno	8	2	0+0	0	3+4	2	0+1	0	0+0	0
10	MF	(Chile) CHI	Jorge Valdivia	6	1	0+0	0	5+1	1	0+0	0	0+0	0
11	FW	(Brazil) BRA	Luan	5	0	0+0	0	5+0	0	0+0	0	0+0	0
14	DF	(Brazil) BRA	Artur	7	3	0+0	0	4+2	3	1+0	0	0+0	0
15	DF	(Brazil) BRA	Maurício Ramos	2	0	0+0	0	2+0	0	0+0	0	0+0	0
16	MF	(Brazil) BRA	João Vitor	11	1	0+0	0	5+6	1	0+0	0	0+0	0
17	MF	(Brazil) BRA	Tinga	2	0	0+0	0	2+0	0	0+0	0	0+0	0
18	DF	(Brazil) BRA	Gerley	2	0	0+0	0	1+1	0	0+0	0	0+0	0
19	FW	(Brazil) BRA	Fernandão	5	2	0+0	0	3+2	2	0+0	0	0+0	0
20	MF	(Brazil) BRA	Marcos Assunção	13	3	0+0	0	12+0	3	1+0	0	0+0	0
21	MF	(Brazil) BRA	Pedro Carmona	3	0	0+0	0	0+2	0	0+1	0	0+0	0
22	GK	(Brazil) BRA	Deola	12	0	0+0	0	11+0	0	1+0	0	0+0	0
23	MF	(Brazil) BRA	Chico	6	0	0+0	0	1+4	0	0+1	0	0+0	0
25	FW	(Brazil) BRA	Vinícius	2	0	0+0	0	0+2	0	0+0	0	0+0	0
27	DF	(Brazil) BRA	Wellington	0	0	0+0	0	0+0	0	0+0	0	0+0	0
29	FW	(Argentina) ARG	Hernán Barcos	9	8	0+0	0	7+1	7	1+0	1	0+0	0
36	DF	(Brazil) BRA	Leandro Amaro	12	1	0+0	0	11+0	1	1+0	0	0+0	0
38	GK	(Brazil) BRA	Pegorari	0	0	0+0	0	0+0	0	0+0	0	0+0	0
40	MF	(Brazil) BRA	Patrik	11	1	0+0	0	5+5	1	1+0	0	0+0	0
46	GK	(Brazil) BRA	Raphael	0	0	0+0	0	0+0	0	0+0	0	0+0	0
47	GK	(Brazil) BRA	Fábio	0	0	0+0	0	0+0	0	0+0	0	0+0	0
83	MF	(Brazil) BRA	Daniel Carvalho	13	3	0+0	0	8+4	3	1+0	0	0+0	0

NOTE: Starting appearance + Substitute appearance
Friendly matches not included

=== Transfers ===
==== In ====
Position	Name	From	Transfer type	Date
LB	(Brazil) Juninho	(Brazil) Figueirense	Normal	7 December 2011
CB	(Paraguay) Adalberto Román	(Argentina) River Plate	Normal	24 December 2011
AM	(Brazil) Daniel Carvalho	(Brazil) Atlético Mineiro	Loan (option for transfer)	9 January 2012
ST	(Argentina) Hernán Barcos	(Ecuador) LDU Quito	Normal	17 January 2012
RB	(Brazil) Artur	(Brazil) São Caetano	Loan	24 January 2012
MF	(Brazil) Wesley	(Germany) Werder Bremen	Normal	27 March 2012
DF	(Brazil) Fernandinho	(Brazil) Oeste	Loan	18 April 2012
FW	(Brazil) Mazinho	(Brazil) Oeste	Loan	18 April 2012
MF	(Brazil) Felipe	(Brazil) Mogi Mirm	Loan return	4 April 2012
FW	(Brazil) Betinho	(Brazil) São Caetano	Loan (option for transfer)	12 May 2012
FW	(Brazil) Obina	(China) Shandong Luneng	Loan	17 July 2012
DM	(Brazil) Corrêa	(Ukraine) Dynamo Kyiv	Loan	15 August 2012
MF	(Brazil) Tiago Real	(Brazil) Joinville	Normal	30 August 2012
DF	(Brazil) Leandro	None	Normal	4 September 2012

==== Out ====
Position	Name	To	Transfer type	Date
LB	(Brazil) Gabriel Silva	(Spain) Granada	Normal	1 January 2012
GK	(Brazil) Marcos	None	Retired	4 January 2012
DM	(Brazil) Pierre	(Brazil) Atlético Mineiro	Normal	9 January 2012
DF	(Brazil) Gerley	(Brazil) Bahia	Loan	24 April 2012
MF	(Brazil) Tinga	(Brazil) Ceará	Loan	24 April 2012
FW	(Brazil) Fernandão	(Brazil) Atlético Paranaense	Normal	30 April 2012
MF	(Brazil) Chico	(Brazil) Coritiba	Normal	30 April 2012
FW	(Brazil) Ricardo Bueno	(Brazil) Atlético Mineiro	Normal	2 May 2012
MF	(Brazil) Pedro Carmona	(Brazil) São Caetano	Normal	3 May 2012
GK	(Brazil) Pegorari	(Brazil) Oeste	Loan	29 May 2012
MF	(Brazil) Felipe	(Brazil) Atlético Paranaense	Normal	23 July 2012
GK	(Brazil) Deola	(Brazil) Vitória	Loan	23 July 2012
DF	(Brazil) Cicinho	(Spain) Sevilla	Normal	30 July 2012

=== Scorers ===
Place	Number	Nation	Position	Name	Brasileiro	Paulista	Copa do Brasil	Sul-Americana	Friendly	Total
1	29	(Argentina)	FW	Hernán Barcos	0	7	1	0	0	8
2	7	(Brazil)	FW	Maikon Leite	0	4	0	0	0	4
3	14	(Brazil)	DF	Artur	0	3	0	0	0	3
3	83	(Brazil)	MF	Daniel Carvalho	0	3	0	0	0	3
3	20	(Brazil)	MF	Marcos Assunção	0	3	0	0	0	3
4	19	(Brazil)	FW	Fernandão	0	2	0	0	0	2
4	6	(Brazil)	DF	Juninho	0	2	0	0	0	2
4	9	(Brazil)	FW	Ricardo Bueno	0	2	0	0	0	2
5	16	(Brazil)	MF	João Vitor	0	1	0	0	0	1
5	10	(Chile)	MF	Jorge Valdivia	0	1	0	0	0	1
5	36	(Brazil)	DF	Leandro Amaro	0	1	0	0	0	1
5	40	(Brazil)	MF	Patrik	0	1	0	0	0	1
5	21	(Brazil)	MF	Pedro Carmona	0	0	0	0	1	1
/	/	/	/	Own goals	0	0	0	0	0	0
				TOTAL	0	30	1	0	1	32

=== Assists ===
Place	Number	Nation	Position	Name	Brasileiro	Paulista	Copa do Brasil	Sul-Americana	Friendly	Total
1	20	(Brazil)	MF	Marcos Assunção	0	7	0	0	0	7
2	83	(Brazil)	MF	Daniel Carvalho	0	2	1	0	0	3
2	6	(Brazil)	DF	Juninho	0	3	0	0	0	3
3	10	(Chile)	MF	Jorge Valdivia	0	2	0	0	0	2
3	7	(Brazil)	FW	Maikon Leite	0	2	0	0	0	2
4	11	(Brazil)	FW	Luan	0	0	0	0	1	1
				TOTAL	0	16	1	0	1	18

=== Disciplinary record ===
Number	Nation	Position	Name	Brasileiro		Paulista		Copa do Brasil		Sul-Americana		Friendly		Total	
Number	Nation	Position	Name	Yellow card	Red card	Yellow card	Red card	Yellow card	Red card	Yellow card	Red card	Yellow card	Red card	Yellow card	Red card
1	(Brazil)	GK	Bruno	0	0	0	0	0	0	0	0	0	0	0	0
2	(Brazil)	DF	Cicinho	0	0	3	0	0	0	0	0	0	0	3	0
3	(Brazil)	DF	Henrique	0	0	5	0	0	0	0	0	0	0	5	0
4	(Brazil)	DF	Thiago Heleno	0	0	0	0	0	0	0	0	0	0	0	0
5	(Paraguay)	DF	Adalberto Román	0	0	1	0	0	0	0	0	0	0	1	0
6	(Brazil)	DF	Juninho	0	0	1	0	0	0	0	0	0	0	1	0
7	(Brazil)	FW	Maikon Leite	0	0	1	0	0	0	0	0	0	0	1	0
8	(Brazil)	MF	Márcio Araújo	0	0	1	0	0	0	0	0	0	0	1	0
9	(Brazil)	FW	Ricardo Bueno	0	0	0	0	0	0	0	0	0	0	0	0
10	(Chile)	MF	Jorge Valdivia	0	0	1	0	0	0	0	0	0	0	1	0
11	(Brazil)	FW	Luan	0	0	0	0	0	0	0	0	0	0	0	0
14	(Brazil)	DF	Artur	0	0	2	0	0	0	0	0	0	0	2	0
15	(Brazil)	DF	Maurício Ramos	0	0	0	0	0	0	0	0	0	0	0	0
16	(Brazil)	MF	João Vitor	0	0	1	0	0	0	0	0	0	0	1	0
17	(Brazil)	MF	Tinga	0	0	0	0	0	0	0	0	0	0	0	0
18	(Brazil)	DF	Gerley	0	0	0	0	0	0	0	0	0	0	0	0
19	(Brazil)	FW	Fernandão	0	0	0	0	0	0	0	0	0	0	0	0
20	(Brazil)	MF	Marcos Assunção	0	0	3	0	0	0	0	0	1	0	4	0
21	(Brazil)	MF	Pedro Carmona	0	0	0	0	1	0	0	0	0	0	1	0
22	(Brazil)	GK	Deola	0	0	0	0	0	0	0	0	0	0	0	0
23	(Brazil)	MF	Chico	0	0	0	0	0	0	0	0	0	0	0	0
25	(Brazil)	FW	Vinícius	0	0	0	0	0	0	0	0	0	0	0	0
27	(Brazil)	DF	Wellington	0	0	0	0	0	0	0	0	0	0	0	0
29	(Argentina)	FW	Hernán Barcos	0	0	1	0	0	0	0	0	0	0	1	0
36	(Brazil)	DF	Leandro Amaro	0	0	3	0	0	0	0	0	0	0	3	0
38	(Brazil)	GK	Pegorari	0	0	0	0	0	0	0	0	0	0	0	0
40	(Brazil)	MF	Patrik	0	0	1	0	0	0	0	0	0	0	1	0
46	(Brazil)	GK	Raphael	0	0	0	0	0	0	0	0	0	0	0	0
47	(Brazil)	GK	Fábio	0	0	0	0	0	0	0	0	0	0	0	0
83	(Brazil)	MF	Daniel Carvalho	0	0	0	0	0	0	0	0	0	0	0	0
			TOTAL	0	0	24	0	1	0	0	0	1	0	26	0

=== Clean sheets ===
Place	Nation	Position	Number	Name	Campeonato Brasileiro	Campeonato Paulista	Copa do Brasil	Copa Sul-Americana	Friendly	Total
1	(Brazil)	GK	22	Deola	0	3	1	0	1	5
				TOTAL	0	3	1	0	1	5
