= 2009 SE Palmeiras season =

Palmeiras
2009 season
- Chairman: Luiz Gonzaga de Mello Belluzzo
- Manager: Vanderlei Luxemburgo, Muricy Ramalho
- Série A: 5th
- São Paulo State Championship: Semi-finalists
- Libertadores Cup: Quarter-finalists
- Top goalscorer: League: Obina (12); All: Keirrison (27)
- Highest home attendance: 27,325 vs Atlético Mineiro (29 November 2009)
- Lowest home attendance: 8,167 vs Santos (28 June 2009)
- Average home league attendance: 21,297
Home colours	Away colours	Third colours

The 2009 SE Palmeiras season was Sociedade Esportiva Palmeiras's 2009 campaign. The club competed in the Campeonato Paulista, the Campeonato Brasileiro Série A, and the Copa Libertadores. Palmeiras reached the semi-finals of the state championship, finished 5th in Série A, and advanced to the quarter-finals of the Libertadores.

== Season ==
=== Série A ===
Palmeiras started well the campaign in the Série A, and led the tournament for 19 rounds, unfortunately the team failed to keep the good results and after a 3–1 away win against Santos, only winning 9 points in 11 matches.

Palmeiras ended in 5th place, it was a disappointing result for a team that played well during almost the entire season and wanted to win the first brazilian title since 1994.

The Palmeiras player with most goals was Obina with 12 goals in 27 league matches, that signed a 1-year loan deal from Flamengo and left the squad before the end of the season after a fight with teammate Maurício during a 0–2 away loss to Grêmio.

Vágner Love returned to the team in August, after an agreement with CSKA Moscow, and scored 5 goals in 12 matches but he didn't have a good return to the team. Attacking midfielder Diego Souza won the award by Placar as the best player of the league, playing 34 matches and scoring 8 goals in the season, including a wonderful midfield goal against Atlético Mineiro. Cleiton Xavier, Pierre, Marcos and Pablo Armero also made great appearances in the league.

Manager Vanderlei Luxemburgo left the team on 25 June alongside young striker Keirrison, after a discussion with Palmeiras chairman Luiz Gonzaga de Mello Belluzzo. The Interim Manager Jorginho assumed the team for 1 month with great results and Muricy Ramalho took charge of the team until the end of the season.

Date	Opponents	H / A	Result F – A	Scorers	Round
9 May 2009	Coritiba	H	2 – 1	Willians 69', Keirrison 88'	1st
17 May 2009	Internacional	A	0 – 2		2nd
24 May 2009	São Paulo	H	0 – 0		3rd
31 May 2009	Barueri	A	2 – 2	Obina 56', Keirrison 60'	4th
7 June 2009	Vitória	H	2 – 1	Ortigoza 65', Maurício Ramos 90'+1	5th
14 June 2009	Cruzeiro	H	3 – 1	Marcão 27', Keirrison 40', 58'	6th
20 June 2009	Atlético Paranaense	A	2 – 2	Obina 68', Keirrison 90'+3	7th
28 June 2009	Santos	H	1 – 1	Obina 32'	8th
5 July 2009	Avaí	A	3 – 0	Obina 25' (pen.), 53', Cleiton Xavier 74'	9th
11 July 2009	Náutico	H	4 – 1	Maurício Ramos 6', Willians 27', Armero 72', Pierre 83'	10th
15 July 2009	Flamengo	A	2 – 1	Diego Souza 23', Ortigoza 43'	11th
18 July 2009	Santo André	H	1 – 0	Diego Souza 23'	12th
22 July 2009	Goiás	A	1 – 2	Diego Souza 52'	13th
26 July 2009	Corinthians	A	3 – 0	Obina 31', 58' (pen.), 65'	14th
29 July 2009	Fluminense	H	1 – 0	Diego Souza 59'	15th
1 August 2009	Sport Recife	A	1 – 0	Bruno Teles 69' (o.g.)	16th
6 August 2009	Grêmio	H	1 – 1	Cleiton Xavier 28'	17th
12 August 2009	Atlético Mineiro	A	1 – 1	Ortigoza 34'	18th
15 August 2009	Botafogo	H	1 – 1	Danilo 32'	19th
19 August 2009	Coritiba	A	0 – 1		20th
22 August 2009	Internacional	H	2 – 1	Obina 37' (pen.), Ortigoza 47'	21st
30 August 2009	São Paulo	A	0 – 0		22nd
5 September 2009	Barueri	H	2 – 1	Diego Souza 49', Vágner Love 72' (pen.)	23rd
13 September 2009	Vitória	A	2 – 3	Robert 40', 88'	24th
23 September 2009	Cruzeiro	A	2 – 1	Diego Souza 9', Vágner Love 50'	25th
26 September 2009	Atlético Paranaense	H	2 – 1	Figueroa 42', Danilo 69'	26th
4 October 2009	Santos	A	3 – 1	Diego Souza 63', Robert 70', Vágner Love 76'	27th
8 October 2009	Avaí	H	2 – 2	Vágner Love 38', Robert 85'	28th
12 October 2009	Náutico	A	0 – 3		29th
18 October 2009	Flamengo	H	0 – 2		30th
21 October 2009	Santo André	A	0 – 2		31st
29 October 2009	Goiás	H	4 – 0	Obina 50', 75' (pen.), 87', Deyvid Sacconi 83'	32nd
1 November 2009	Corinthians	H	2 – 2	Danilo 51', Maurício 83'	33rd
8 November 2009	Fluminense	A	0 – 1		34th
11 November 2009	Sport Recife	H	2 – 2	Deyvid Sacconi 71', Danilo 85'	35th
18 November 2009	Grêmio	A	0 – 2		36th
29 November 2009	Atlético Mineiro	H	3 – 1	Cleiton Xavier 1', Diego Souza 16', Vágner Love 35'	37th
6 December 2009	Botafogo	A	1 – 2	Robert 90'+1	38th

Pos	Club	Pld	W	D	L	F	A	GD	Pts
1	Flamengo	38	19	10	9	58	44	+14	67
2	Internacional	38	19	8	11	65	44	+21	65
3	São Paulo	38	18	11	9	57	42	+15	65
4	Cruzeiro	38	18	8	12	58	53	+5	62
5	Palmeiras	38	17	11	10	58	45	+13	62

Pld = Matches played; W = Matches won; D = Matches drawn; L = Matches lost; F = Goals for; A = Goals against; GD = Goal difference; Pts = Points

=== Libertadores Cup ===
==== First stage ====
Date	Opponents	H / A	Result F – A	Scorers
29 January 2009	Real Potosí	H	5 – 1	Keirrison 3', 20' (pen.), Diego Souza 39', Cleiton Xavier 58', Edmílson 90'+1
4 February 2009	Real Potosí	A	2 – 0	Cleiton Xavier 29', Keirrison 74'

==== Group stage ====
Date	Opponents	H / A	Result F – A	Scorers
17 February 2009	LDU Quito	A	2 – 3	Willians 28', Edmílson 45'+1
3 March 2009	Colo-Colo	H	1 – 3	Keirrison 73'
8 April 2009	Sport Recife	A	2 – 0	Keirrison 24', Diego Souza 73'
15 April 2009	Sport Recife	H	1 – 1	Keirrison 14' (pen.)
21 April 2009	LDU Quito	H	2 – 0	Marcão 48', Diego Souza 83'
29 April 2009	Colo-Colo	A	1 – 0	Cleiton Xavier 87'

Team	Pld	W	D	L	GF	GA	GD	Pts
(Brazil) Sport Recife	6	4	1	1	10	7	+3	13
(Brazil) Palmeiras	6	3	1	2	9	7	+2	10
(Chile) Colo-Colo	6	2	1	3	9	7	+2	6
(Ecuador) LDU Quito	6	1	1	4	6	13	−7	4

==== Knockout stage ====
Date	Round	Opponents	H / A	Result F – A	Scorers
5 May 2009	Round of 16	Sport Recife	H	1 – 0	Ortigoza 74'
12 May 2009	Round of 16	Sport Recife	A	0 – 1 (3-1 p.s.o)	
28 May 2009	Quarter-Finals	Nacional	H	1 – 1	Diego Souza 55'
17 June 2009	Quarter-Finals	Nacional	A	0 – 0 (a)	
