= Leandro Amaro =

Brazilian footballer (born 1986)

Personal information
- Full name: Leandro Amaro dos Santos Ferreira
- Date of birth: June 19, 1986 (age 40)
- Place of birth: Campinas, Brazil
- Height: 1.86 m (6 ft 1 in)
- Position: Centre back

Team information
- Current team: Central

Youth career
- 2004–2005: Cruzeiro

Senior career*
Years	Team	Apps	(Gls)
2006–2010	Cruzeiro		
2006	→ Cabofriense (loan)		
2007	→ Villa Nova (loan)		
2008	→ Cabofriense (loan)		
2009	→ Marília (loan)	0	(0)
2009	→ Villa Nova (loan)	0	(0)
2009	→ Atlético Goianiense (loan)	18	(1)
2010	→ Botafogo-SP (loan)	0	(0)
2010–2014	Palmeiras	34	(1)
2013	→ Avaí (loan)	2	(0)
2013	→ Náutico (loan)	17	(0)
2014	→ Chapecoense (loan)	0	(0)
2015	ABC	14	(0)
2016	Itumbiara	0	(0)
2016	Mirassol	0	(0)
2016	Guarani	20	(5)
2017	Ferroviária	0	(0)
2017–2018	Oeste	55	(3)
2019	Mirassol	0	(0)
2019	Botafogo-SP	23	(0)
2020–2021	São Bernardo	30	(0)
2022	Portuguesa-RJ	30	(2)
2023–2024	River	36	(3)
2025–	Central	2	(0)
- * Club domestic league appearances and goals as of 27 February 2025

Leandro Amaro dos Santos Ferreira (born June 19, 1986, in Campinas) is a Brazilian football defender, who plays for Central.

== Career ==
Contracted since his youth with Cruzeiro Esporte Clube, Leandro Amaro had several loan spells with Cabofriense, Villa Nova, Marilia, Villa Nova, Goianiense and Botafogo-SP before signing for Palmeiras in 2010. After two years in the Palmeiras team he was loaned out successively to Avaí, Náutico and Chapecoense in 2013 and 2014 before his contract expired.

In 2015 he was contracted to ABC, but agreed a mutual termination in August. He played with Itumbiara in early 2016, but was signed by Mirassol in April of that year to strengthen their side in the quarter-final stages of the Campeonato Paulista second division. At the end of that campaign he moved to Guarani for the 2016 Campeonato Brasileiro Série C, winning promotion. He was not retained by Guarani, and signed for Ferroviária for the 2017 Campeonato Paulista. From there he agreed a contract with Oeste for the 2017 Campeonato Brasileiro Série B. The club finished 6th, and he renewed for the 2018 season, but after a poor start to the Série B campaign he was released and immediately re-signed for Mirassol for their 2018 Copa Paulista and 2019 Campeonato Paulista campaigns.

He signed for Botafogo-SP, newly promoted to Série B, in April 2019.

== Career statistics ==
As of 3 May 2019

Club	Season	League		Cup		Continental		State League		Total	
Club	Season	Apps	Goals	Apps	Goals	Apps	Goals	Apps	Goals	Apps	Goals
Marília (loan)	2009	–		–		–		3	0	3	0
Villa Nova (loan)	2009	–		–		–		1	0	1	0
Atlético Goianiense (loan)	2009	18	1	–		–		–		18	1
Botafogo-SP (loan)	2010	–		–		–		18	1	18	1
Palmeiras	2010	6	1	–		2	0	–		8	1
Palmeiras	2011	11	0	2	0	0	0	8	1	21	1
Palmeiras	2012	17	0	7	2	3	0	15	1	42	3
Palmeiras	2013	–		–		0	0	0	0	0	0
Palmeiras	Total	34	1	9	2	5	0	23	2	71	5
Avaí (loan)	2013	2	0	–		–		–		2	0
Náutico (loan)	2013	17	0	–		1	0	–		18	0
Chapecoense (loan)	2014	–		0	0	–		0	0	0	0
ABC	2015	14	0	4	2	–		16	5	34	7
Itumbiara	2016	–		–		–		13	0	13	0
Mirassol	2016	–		–		–		3	0	3	0
Guarani	2016	20	5	–		–		–		20	5
Ferroviária	2017	–		1	0	–		15	2	16	2
Oeste	2017	34	1	–		–		–		34	1
Oeste	2018	21	2	2	0	–		13	1	36	3
Oeste	Total	55	3	2	0	0	0	13	1	70	4
Mirassol	2019	–		0	0	–		13	2	13	2
Botafogo-SP	2019	2	0	–		–		–		2	0
Career total		162	10	16	4	6	0	118	13	302	27

== Honours ==
Palmeiras

- Copa do Brasil: 2012
