= Henrique (footballer, born October 1986) =

Brazilian footballer

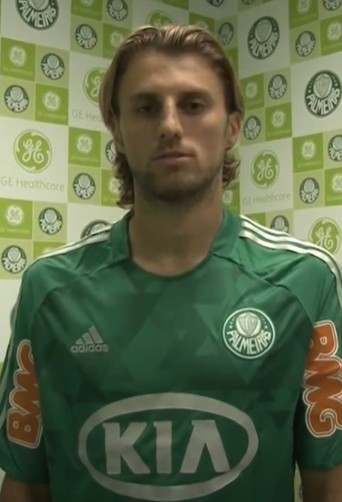
- Henrique with Palmeiras in 2013

Personal information
- Full name: Henrique Adriano Buss
- Date of birth: 14 October 1986 (age 40)
- Place of birth: Marechal Cândido Rondon, Brazil
- Height: 1.86 m (6 ft 1 in)
- Position: Centre back

Youth career
- 1998–2005: Coritiba

Senior career*
Years	Team	Apps	(Gls)
2006–2008	Coritiba	91	(11)
2008	Palmeiras	11	(1)
2008–2012	Barcelona	0	(0)
2008–2009	→ Bayer Leverkusen (loan)	27	(0)
2009–2011	→ Racing Santander (loan)	57	(3)
2011–2012	→ Palmeiras (loan)	44	(5)
2012–2014	Palmeiras	68	(5)
2014–2016	Napoli	22	(1)
2016–2017	Fluminense	94	(3)
2018–2019	Corinthians	66	(4)
2019–2020	Ittihad Kalba	11	(1)
2020–2021	Belenenses SAD	25	(0)
2021–2023	Coritiba	65	(3)

International career^{‡}
2008–2014	Brazil	6	(0)
- * Club domestic league appearances and goals as of 16:01, 12 April 2023 (UTC) ‡ National team caps and goals as of 4 July 2014

Henrique Adriano Buss (born 14 October 1986), simply known as Henrique (Brazilian Portuguese: [ẽˈʁiki]), is a Brazilian former professional footballer who played as a central defender. He has played for the Brazil national team, making his debut in 2008 and being included among the 23-man list for the 2014 FIFA World Cup.

His main asset is his versatility, as he can play as a central defender, right back or defensive midfielder.

== Club career ==
=== Coritiba and Palmeiras ===
Henrique started his career at Coritiba in his home region. In 2008, he was bought by Palmeiras in a deal partially financed by Traffic Group. Part of the later transfer fee of Henrique from Barcelona was credited to Desportivo Brasil, the subsidiary of Traffic and re-distributed by Desportivo to Palmeiras.

=== Barcelona ===
Dutch club Ajax were said to have tabled a bid for Henrique in June 2008, which was soon followed by a report saying he had agreed terms with Barcelona. In the end, Barcelona had secured Henrique's services from Palmeiras for €8 million, with an extra €2 million in bonuses. He signed a five-year deal and was to be immediately loaned out to German Bundesliga side Bayer Leverkusen. The transfer to Barça was officially completed a day later. Henrique made 27 league appearances in his season with Leverkusen and reached the final of the 2008–09 DFB-Pokal. He returned to Barcelona in June 2009, being given the number 23 shirt upon his return. On 31 August 2009, he was again loaned out, this time to Racing de Santander. The loan was renewed for a second year on 26 July 2010.

Barcelona wrote-down €1.757 million for the residual contract value of Henrique for the 2010–11 season.

=== Palmeiras ===
On 15 July 2011, Henrique returned to Brazil on another loan deal from Barcelona. During the 2012 Copa do Brasil campaign, coach Luiz Felipe Scolari started playing Henrique as a holding midfielder and the player thrived in the new role, with Palmeiras eventually winning the competition.

On 2 June 2012, Barcelona cancelled Henrique's contract, prompting his release from the club. He then joined Palmeiras on a free transfer after a successful loan spell in 2011–12. Palmeiras, however, remained the holder of 80% of Henrique's economic rights, with 20% of any future transfer fee to be paid to unknown parties. Henrique also became second captain of the squad, behind dead-ball specialist Marcos Assunção in the pecking order.

=== Napoli ===
On 30 January 2014, Henrique officially signed with Italian Serie A club Napoli. The deal was completed for €4 million with the player agreeing to a three-and-a-half-year contract. He played all 90 minutes of their 3–1 victory over Fiorentina in the 2014 Coppa Italia Final on 3 May.

=== Fluminense ===
On 11 January 2016, Henrique joined Fluminense on a three-year contract.

== International career ==
On 21 March 2008, Henrique received his first call up to the Brazil national team after centre back Juan was cut from the squad due to an injury to his ankle.

On 16 April 2013, Henrique was called up by Luiz Felipe Scolari, his former coach at Palmeiras, for a friendly against Chile on 24 April at the Mineirão. But on 19 April, as Palmeiras would play against Tijuana the next day, Henrique was cut from the list, and Rodrigo Moledo of Internacional was called up in his place. On the same day, Conmebol had moved the Palmeiras game and Henrique was recalled, but Moledo was nonetheless kept on the list.

On 7 May 2014, Henrique was selected as part of the Brazil squad for the upcoming World Cup, to be played on home soil.

His sole appearance at the tournament was the final two minutes of the quarter-final victory over Colombia, replacing the injured forward Neymar, as Brazil eventually finished fourth.

== Career statistics ==
=== Club ===
As of 12 April 2023.

Club	Season	League (Note: Includes Campeonato Brasileiro Série A, Campeonato Brasileiro Série B, Bundesliga, La Liga, Serie A, UAE League and Primeira Liga.)			State League (Note: Includes Campeonato Paranaense, Campeonato Paulista and Campeonato Carioca.)		Cup (Note: Includes Copa do Brasil, DFB Pokal, Copa del Rey, Coppa Italia and UAE League Cup.)		Continental (Note: Includes Copa Libertadores, Copa Sudamericana, UEFA Champions League and UEFA Europa League.)		Other (Note: Includes Primeira Liga do Brasil.)		Total	
Club	Season	Division	Apps	Goals	Apps	Goals	Apps	Goals	Apps	Goals	Apps	Goals	Apps	Goals
Coritiba	2006	Série B	29	3	9	2	3	0	—		—		41	5
Coritiba	2007	Série B	30	3	20	3	6	1	—		—		56	7
Coritiba	2008	Série A	0	0	3	0	0	0	—		—		3	0
Coritiba	Total		59	6	32	5	9	1	—		—		100	12
Palmeiras	2008	Série A	5	1	6	0	4	0	0	0	—		15	1
Barcelona	2008–09	La Liga	0	0	—		0	0	0	0	—		0	0
Bayer Leverkusen (loan)	2008–09	Bundesliga	27	0	—		4	0	—		—		31	0
Racing Santander (loan)	2009–10	La Liga	22	1	—		4	1	—		—		26	2
Racing Santander (loan)	2010–11	La Liga	35	2	—		2	0	—		—		37	2
Racing Santander (loan)	Total		57	3	—		6	1	—		—		63	4
Palmeiras (loan)	2011	Série A	21	3	—		0	0	2	0	—		23	3
Palmeiras	2012	Série A	28	1	17	2	9	2	3	0	—		57	5
Palmeiras	2013	Série B	28	1	15	3	2	0	6	1	—		51	5
Palmeiras	2014	Série A	0	0	3	0	0	0	—		—		3	0
Palmeiras	Total		56	2	35	5	11	2	9	1	—		111	10
Napoli	2013–14	Serie A	11	1	—		2	0	4	0	—		17	1
Napoli	2014–15	Serie A	11	0	—		1	0	9	1	0	0	21	1
Napoli	2015–16	Serie A	0	0	—		0	0	0	0	—		0	0
Napoli	Total		22	1	—		3	0	13	1	0	0	38	2
Fluminense	2016	Série A	37	0	13	1	7	0	0	0	4	0	61	1
Fluminense	2017	Série A	29	1	15	1	8	1	4	0	—		56	3
Fluminense	Total		66	1	28	2	15	1	4	0	4	0	117	4
Corinthians	2018	Série A	35	2	12	1	8	0	8	0	—		63	3
Corinthians	2019	Série A	5	0	14	1	7	1	5	0	—		31	2
Corinthians	Total		40	2	26	2	15	1	13	0	—		94	5
Ittihad Kalba	2019–20	UAE Pro League	11	1	—		6	0	—		—		17	1
Belenenses SAD	2020–21	Primeira Liga	25	0	—		2	0	—		—		27	0
Coritiba	2021	Série B	32	1	—		0	0	—		—		32	1
Coritiba	2022	Série A	18	0	10	2	4	0	—		—		32	2
Coritiba	2023	Série A	0	0	5	0	0	0	—		—		5	0
Coritiba	Total		50	1	15	2	4	0	—		—		69	3
Career total			439	21	142	16	79	6	41	2	4	0	705	45

=== International ===
As of match played 4 July 2014.

International statistics
National team	Year	Apps	Goals
Brazil	2008	1	0
Brazil	2013	3	0
Brazil	2014	2	0
Total		6	0

== Honours ==
Coritiba;

- Campeonato Brasileiro Série B: 2007
- Paraná State Championship: 2022

Palmeiras

- São Paulo State Championship: 2008
- Copa do Brasil: 2012
- Campeonato Brasileiro Série B: 2013

Napoli

- Coppa Italia: 2013–14
- Supercoppa Italiana: 2014

Corinthians

- Campeonato Paulista: 2018, 2019

=== Individual ===
- Campeonato Carioca Team of the year: 2017
