= Maikon Leite =

Brazilian footballer (born 1988)

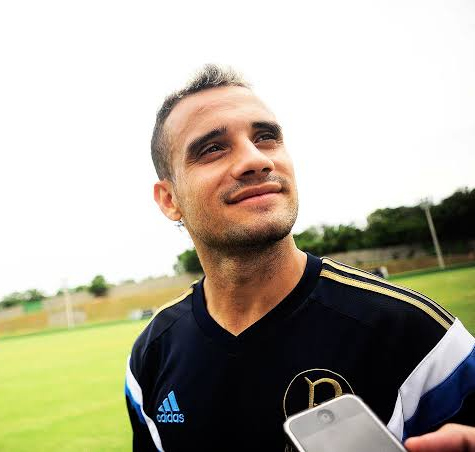
- Maikon Leite with Palmeiras in 2015

Personal information
- Full name: Maikon Fernando Souza Leite
- Date of birth: 3 August 1988 (age 38)
- Place of birth: Mogi das Cruzes, Brazil
- Height: 1.68 m (5 ft 6 in)
- Positions: Winger; second striker

Team information
- Current team: Juara

Youth career
- 2003–2005: Santo André

Senior career*
Years	Team	Apps	(Gls)
2006–2008	Santo André	56	(11)
2008–2011	Santos	15	(2)
2010	→ Atlético Paranaense (loan)	22	(4)
2011–2016	Palmeiras	75	(10)
2013	→ Náutico (loan)	23	(8)
2014	→ Atlas (loan)	33	(5)
2015	→ Sport (loan)	25	(4)
2016	→ Al-Shaab (loan)	7	(1)
2016–2017	Toluca	4	(1)
2017	Bahia	7	(0)
2017	Ceará	5	(1)
2018	Figueirense	31	(3)
2019	Brasiliense	16	(4)
2020	Amazonas FC	0	(0)
2020–2021	Petro de Luanda		
2020–2021	Juventus-SC	11	(2)
2022	Interporto	3	(1)
2022	União Luziense	8	(1)
2023	Nacional-PB	4	(0)
2024	Batalhão FC	6	(2)
2024–	Juara	3	(0)
- * Club domestic league appearances and goals as of 18:03, 29 September 2024 (UTC)

Maikon Fernando Souza Leite (born 3 August 1988 in Mogi das Cruzes) is a Brazilian footballer who currently plays for Juara as a right winger or as a second striker.

== Career ==
In 2019-20, he signed in for Angolan side Petro de Luanda.

== Honours ==
=== Club ===
Santo André

- Campeonato Paulista Série A2: 2006

Santos

- Campeonato Paulista: 2010, 2011
- Copa do Brasil: 2010
- Copa Libertadores: 2011

Palmeiras

- Copa do Brasil: 2012
