= Juninho (footballer, born January 1990) =

Brazilian footballer

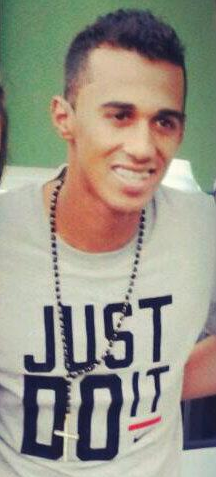
- Juninho in 2013

Personal information
- Full name: Evanildo Borges Barbosa Júnior
- Date of birth: January 11, 1990 (age 36)
- Place of birth: Salvador, Brazil
- Height: 1.71 m (5 ft 7 in)
- Position: Left back

Team information
- Current team: Blooming
- Number: 7

Youth career
- 2005–2008: Pão de Açúcar

Senior career*
Years	Team	Apps	(Gls)
2008–2010	Pão de Açúcar		
2008–2010	→ Figueirense (loan)	37	(3)
2011	Figueirense	55	(3)
2012–2016	Coimbra	0	(0)
2012–2014	→ Palmeiras (loan)	131	(11)
2015	→ Figueirense (loan)	12	(0)
2016	→ Goiás (loan)	33	(1)
2017	Aktobe	17	(1)
2017–2019	Vitória	27	(1)
2019	Londrina	7	(0)
2020–	Blooming	5	(0)
- * Club domestic league appearances and goals as of 12:57, 21 August 2020 (UTC)

Evanildo Borges Barbosa Júnior (born January 11, 1990, in Salvador, Bahia), known as Juninho, is a left back who plays for Club Blooming.

== Career ==
In January 2017, Juninho moved to the Kazakhstan Premier League, signing with FC Aktobe.

== Honours ==
Palmeiras

- Copa do Brasil: 2012
- Campeonato Brasileiro Série B: 2013

=== Individual ===
- Silver Ball: 2011
