= João Vitor (footballer, born 1988) =

Brazilian footballer

Personal information
- Full name: João Vitor Lima Gomes
- Date of birth: 1 June 1988 (age 38)
- Place of birth: Maceió, Brazil
- Height: 1.76 m (5 ft 9 in)
- Position: Central midfielder

Youth career
- Marília

Senior career*
Years	Team	Apps	(Gls)
2007–2009	Marília	46	(2)
2009	Grêmio Barueri	26	(0)
2010	Grêmio Prudente	54	(2)
2011–2012	Palmeiras	88	(3)
2013–2014	Criciúma	100	(5)
2015	Gaziantepspor	8	(0)
2015	Figueirense	25	(1)
2016–2019	Ponte Preta	82	(2)
2019	→ Coritiba (loan)	15	(0)
2019	Coritiba	5	(0)
2019	CSA	20	(0)
2020	Água Santa	10	(0)
2022	Murici	10	(1)
- * Club domestic league appearances and goals as of 12 April 2022

João Vitor Lima Gomes, or simply João Vitor (born 1 June 1988), is a Brazilian professional footballer who plays as a central midfielder.

== Career ==
In April 2019, João Vitor signed a contract with Coritiba.

== Honours ==
Palmeiras

- Copa do Brasil: 2012
