= Adalberto Román =

Paraguayan footballer (born 1987)

Román
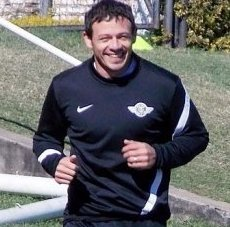

Personal information
- Full name: Adalberto Román Benítez
- Date of birth: 11 April 1987 (age 39)
- Place of birth: Yhú, Paraguay
- Height: 1.69 m (5 ft 7 in)
- Position: Centre back

Senior career*
Years	Team	Apps	(Gls)
2006–2010	Libertad	83	(8)
2010–2013	River Plate	34	(3)
2012	→ Palmeiras (loan)	7	(1)
2013–2018	Libertad	80	(1)
2018	Cerro Porteño	2	(0)
2019–2020	San Lorenzo	7	(0)

International career
2009–2012	Paraguay	3	(0)
- * Club domestic league appearances and goals as of 3 March 2019

Adalberto Román Benítez (born 11 April 1987), is a Paraguayan footballer who most recently played for Club Sportivo San Lorenzo.

== Club career ==
Román started his career in 2006 with Libertad in a 5–1 victory over 12 de Octubre, scoring his first professional goal in that same game.

In 2010, the Paraguayan defender was bought by Argentine side River Plate.

Román made his debut in the fourth round of the 2010 Apertura against Argentinos Juniors, a match that ended in a scoreless draw. After that match, the fans started calling him the Paraguayan Maldini, despite playing out of position, mostly filling in as right-back. He scored his first goal for River in the ninth round of the Apertura in the 86th minute to earn a 2–2 draw for his club, a header to draw with Banfield. He scored his second goal for the club in a 1–0 win over Olimpo in round 16, another header. He scored his third goal in the final round of the Apertura in a 4–1 victory over Lanús. During the Clausura, he was often criticized for his poor performances and poor form; during the promotion against Belgrano, he created a penalty which would later be influential in River Plate's relegation to Nacional B. Despite criticism from River Plate fans, Román was still included in the Nacional B squad, but manager Matías Almeyda only used him during a 2–0 defeat against Atlético Tucumán on 13 November.

In 2012, Román went to Palmeiras on loan for a year.

In 2013, Roman returned to River Plate.

== Honours ==
Title	Club	Season
Primera División	Libertad	2006
Primera División	Libertad	2007
Apertura Primera División	Libertad	2008
Clausura Primera División	Libertad	2008

Palmeiras

- Copa do Brasil: 2012
