= Hernán Barcos =

Argentine footballer

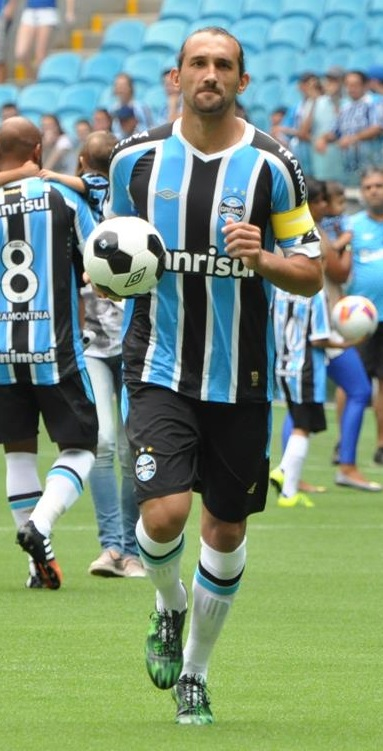
- Barcos with Grêmio in 2015

Personal information
- Date of birth: 11 April 1984 (age 42)
- Place of birth: Bell Ville, Argentina
- Height: 1.87 m (6 ft 2 in)
- Position: Forward

Team information
- Current team: Sporting Cristal
- Number: 29

Youth career
- Racing

Senior career*
Years	Team	Apps	(Gls)
2004–2009	Racing	3	(0)
2005–2006	→ Guaraní (loan)	40	(9)
2006–2007	→ Olmedo (loan)	43	(22)
2007–2008	→ Red Star Belgrade (loan)	9	(2)
2008	→ Huracán (loan)	17	(3)
2009	→ Shanghai Shenhua (loan)	14	(3)
2009	→ Shenzhen Asia Travel (loan)	14	(14)
2010–2011	LDU Quito	64	(38)
2012–2013	Palmeiras	50	(25)
2013–2015	Grêmio	90	(40)
2015	Tianjin TEDA	29	(15)
2016–2017	Sporting CP	8	(0)
2016	→ Vélez Sarsfield (loan)	11	(2)
2017	→ LDU Quito (loan)	36	(21)
2018	LDU Quito	20	(9)
2018–2019	Cruzeiro	14	(1)
2019	Atlético Nacional	42	(11)
2020	Bashundhara Kings	0	(0)
2020	Messina	0	(0)
2021–2025	Alianza Lima	154	(68)
2026	Cajamarca	17	(9)
2026–	Sporting Cristal	14	(6)

International career
2012	Argentina	4	(0)
- * Club domestic league appearances and goals as of 7 November 2026

Hernán Barcos (Spanish pronunciation: [eɾˈnam ˈbaɾkos]; (Note: In isolation, Hernán is pronounced [eɾˈnan].) born 11 April 1984) is an Argentine professional footballer who plays as a forward for Peruvian club Sporting Cristal. He is nicknamed El Pirata (The Pirate) and is well known for his finishing ability, technique and strength.

== Club career ==
=== Early career ===
Barcos debuted professionally for Racing in August 2004. He then went on to play on loan for Club Guaraní (Paraguay), Olmedo (Ecuador), Red Star Belgrade (Serbia), and Huracán (Argentina).

On 7 October 2007, Barcos scored his first Serbian SuperLiga goals by netting twice in the late minutes versus Banat Zrenjanin, helping Red Star to get three points. He previously scored once in a Serbian Cup game against Teleoptik.

=== Chinese Super League ===
In February 2009, Barcos signed a year long loan with Chinese Super League side Shanghai Shenhua. However, after a disappointing half season at Shanghai, he was loaned out to Shenzhen Asia Travel, a fellow CSL club. He scored the first hat-trick in his career in Shenzhen's 4–0 victory over Changchun Yatai on 16 September 2009. He scored 14 goals in 14 league games with Shenzhen and won Chinese Football Association Golden Boot award in the end of the season.

=== LDU Quito ===
In early 2010, Barcos transferred to LDU Quito to reinforce the squad after their leading goalscorer transferred out. He established himself as a capable striker for the squad, starting a five-game run where he scored one goal a game. Barcos, or "El Pirata" as he was nicknamed by the Liga fans, scored two vital goals against Estudiantes de La Plata in LDU's 2–1 first-leg win, winning the 2010 Recopa Sudamericana. Barcos' ended his illustrious 2010 season as Ecuadorian Serie A champion, having scored 22 league goals in 32 games, second best in the league, behind Jaime Ayoví who scored 23 goals.

In the 2011 Ecuadorian Serie A season, Barcos scored 25 goals in 51 matches in all competitions. On 13 August 2011, Barcos did what no other LDU Quito player had ever accomplished in any competition, he scored five goals in a single game against Manta. Barcos would continue with his scoring ability, netting in seven goals in the 2011 Copa Sudamericana. He scored an important away goal for LDU Quito in the team's first win ever in Buenos Aires in a 1–0 win against Vélez Sarsfield, thus reaching the Copa Sudamericana finals. He failed to score a single goal in the finals against Universidad de Chile, and though only ended up as runner up in the competition, he and the rest of LDU Quito received support and appraisal from the club's fans. After two amazing years with the club, he had many offers from wealthy clubs. In January 2012, LDU Quito was offered $8 million from a Middle Eastern club to sign Barcos, while simultaneously also offered only $3.5 million from Palmeiras. Even though LDU Quito was suffering from debt, they honored Barcos' wishes to play for Palmeiras, and on 17 January 2012, he signed for the Brazilian team.

=== Palmeiras ===
On 17 January 2012, Barcos joined Brazilian Série A club Palmeiras for an undisclosed fee. He scored his first goal for the club on 11 February 2012, in a 3–0 victory against Ituano in the Paulistão. Barcos promised to achieve a total number of 27 goals in his first season with Palmeiras, thus showing a countdown of how many are left to go on his football shoes. On 27 February 2012, football specialist Ledio Carmona compared Barcos to a lobster, playing with coach Luiz Felipe Scolari who had said he wanted shrimp, meaning the quality of Palmeiras' signings for the new season. Barcos helped Palmeiras reach the 2012 Copa do Brasil finals by scoring four goals in eight cup games.

On 1 August 2012, Barcos scored a double in Palmeiras' debut in the Copa Sudamericana against Botafogo. He scored another double against Botafogo again, this time in a league match a week later, winning 2–1. Despite Palmeiras' relegation and interest of European clubs, Barcos via Twitter confirmed he would continue to play for the club in 2013. In his words: "I have the dream to play a World Cup, but the only way to leave Palmeiras is receiving a irrefusable deal, that the club cannot say 'no'. I will stay in Palmeiras for love and for liking Palmeiras".

Palmeiras confirmed Barcos would stay for the 2013 season, having been relegated to Serie B, though he was able to participate in the 2013 Copa Libertadores. For Barcos, support from the fans of Palmeiras and Gilson Kleina were fundamental points for him to remain with the Verdão.

=== Grêmio ===
Barcos became Gremio's shock-signing for the 2013 season, wanting to arm a strong side for the 2013 Copa Libertadores. His debut came on 14 February, also scoring from the penalty spot, in a 2–1 home loss in a group-stage match up against Chilean Primera División side Huachipato. In August 2014, he scored twice in a match against Corinthians, becoming the top foreign goalscorer for Grêmio with 36 goals.

=== Later career ===
On 16 February 2015, Barcos transferred to Chinese Super League side Tianjin TEDA. After a prolific goalscoring season, he transferred to Portuguese side Sporting CP. However, after a brief spell in Europe, the centre-forward returned to the Argentine Primera División, joining Vélez Sarsfield. Barcos debuted for Vélez in a 2–0 defeat to Gimnasia y Esgrima La Plata for the first fixture of the 2016–17 Argentine Primera División and scored his first goal in a 2–1 victory against Colón for the 6th fixture.

=== Return to LDU Quito ===
On 14 January 2017, LDU Quito announced the return of Barcos to the Ecuadorean capital. He was to be incorporated to the team to complete the new squad for the 2017 campaign in time for La Noche Blanca, the derby game against Deportivo Cali. The loan deal will last until the end of 2017.

=== Bashundhara Kings ===
On 2 February 2020, Bangladesh Premier League defending champions Bashundhara Kings confirmed that Barcos will be part of the team for AFC Cup and the 2nd leg of the league.

=== Messina ===
On 30 October 2020, Barcos was formally introduced as a new signing for Italian Serie D club Messina. He however left Messina on 23 December 2020, without making a single appearance, due to unsolved bureaucratic issues regarding his non-EU citizen status.

=== Alianza Lima ===
On 17 February 2021, Barcos joined Peruvian club Alianza Lima. In his first season with the club, he scored 10 goals, propelling Alianza Lima to be crowned Liga 1 champions. In December 2021, he signed an extension until 2022.

On 8 May 2024, Barcos scored a late equaliser to salvage a 1–1 draw with Cerro Porteño in the 2024 Copa Libertadores group stage, becoming, at the age of 40, the oldest player to score for Alianza in the competition, surpassing Wilmer Aguirre's record from 2022 at the age of 38. This was also his first goal in the Copa Libertadores in 10 years, having last netted on 11 April 2014, when he was still at Gremio. In 2025, he scored 4 goals during the qualifying stages of the Copa Libertadores, helping Alianza reach the group stage of the tournament. On 22 April, Barcos and his fellow 40-year-old teammate Paolo Guerrero scored all three goals in Lima's 3–2 victory over Talleres de Córdoba in a group stage match, marking the first time in the history of Copa Libertadores that two players aged 40+ scored in the same match.

== International career ==
On 23 August 2012, Barcos was called up for the matches against Paraguay and Peru for the 2014 FIFA World Cup qualification but he ended up being an unused substitute in them. Instead, he made his national team debut on 19 September 2012, as a starter in a match against Brazil for the Superclásico de las Américas. In October 2012, Barcos also came on as a late substitute in World Cup qualifying matches against Uruguay and Chile.

== Personal life ==
On 16 February 2012, after a comparison with Brazilian singer Zé Ramalho made by Léo Bianchi, journalist of Rede Globo, Barcos cursed the reporter, calling him "boludo", a popular scold in Argentina.

== Career statistics ==
As of 7 November 2026

Appearances and goals by club, season and competition
Club	Season	League			State league		National cup		Continental		Other		Total	
Club	Season	Division	Apps	Goals	Apps	Goals	Apps	Goals	Apps	Goals	Apps	Goals	Apps	Goals
Racing	2004–05	Argentine Primera División	3	0	—		—		—		—		3	0
Guaraní (loan)	2005	Paraguayan Primera División	23	4	—		—		1	0	—		24	4
Guaraní (loan)	2006	Paraguayan Primera División	17	5	—		—		—		—		17	5
Guaraní (loan)	Total		40	9	—		—		1	0	—		41	9
Olmedo (loan)	2006	Ecuadorian Serie A	28	18	—		—		—		—		28	18
Olmedo (loan)	2007	Ecuadorian Serie A	15	4	—		—		—		—		15	4
Olmedo (loan)	Total		43	22	—		—		—		—		43	22
Red Star Belgrade (loan)	2007–08	Serbian SuperLiga	9	2	—		2	1	7	0	—		18	3
Huracán (loan)	2008–09	Argentine Primera División	17	3	—		—		—		—		17	3
Shanghai Shenhua (loan)	2009	Chinese Super League	14	3	—		—		6	3	—		20	6
Shenzhen Asia Travel (loan)	2009	Chinese Super League	14	14	—		—		—		—		14	14
LDU Quito	2010	Ecuadorian Serie A	32	22	—		—		8	5	1	1	41	28
LDU Quito	2011	Ecuadorian Serie A	32	16	—		—		19	10	0	0	51	26
LDU Quito	Total		64	38	—		—		27	15	1	1	92	54
Palmeiras	2012	Série A	29	14	15	8	8	4	3	2	—		55	28
Palmeiras	2013	Série B	0	0	6	3	0	0	0	0	—		6	3
Palmeiras	Total		29	14	21	11	8	4	3	2	—		61	31
Grêmio	2013	Série A	37	9	7	2	5	0	8	2	—		57	13
Grêmio	2014	Série A	32	14	13	13	1	0	8	2	—		54	29
Grêmio	2015	Série A	0	0	1	2	0	0	—		—		1	2
Grêmio	Total		69	23	21	17	6	0	16	4	—		112	44
Tianjin TEDA	2015	Chinese Super League	29	15	—		0	0	—		—		29	15
Sporting CP	2015–16	Primeira Liga	8	0	—		0	0	0	0	0	0	8	0
Sporting CP	2016–17	Primeira Liga	0	0	—		0	0	0	0	0	0	0	0
Sporting CP	Total		8	0	—		0	0	0	0	0	0	8	0
Vélez Sarsfield (loan)	2016	Argentine Primera División	11	2	—		0	0	—		—		11	2
LDU Quito (loan)	2017	Ecuadorian Serie A	36	21	—		—		6	3	2	2	44	26
LDU Quito	2018	Ecuadorian Serie A	20	9	—		—		2	2	0	0	22	11
Cruzeiro	2018	Série A	14	1	0	0	6	2	4	0	—		24	3
Atlético Nacional	2019	Categoría Primera A	42	11	—		4	2	5	2	0	0	51	15
Bashundhara Kings	2019–20	Bangladesh Premier League	0	0	—		0	0	1	4	—		1	4
Alianza Lima	2021	Liga 1	28	10	—		1	1	0	0	—		29	11
Alianza Lima	2022	Liga 1	35	18	—		—		6	0	—		41	18
Alianza Lima	2023	Liga 1	34	17	—		—		5	0	—		39	17
Alianza Lima	2024	Liga 1	28	14	—		—		5	2	—		33	16
Alianza Lima	2025	Liga 1	29	9	—		—		18	6	—		47	15
Alianza Lima	Total		154	68	—		1	1	34	8	—		189	77
Cajamarca	2026	Liga 1	17	9	—		0	0	—		—		17	9
Sporting Cristal	2026	Liga 1	14	6	—		4	1	2	0	—		20	7
Career total			647	270	42	28	31	11	114	43	3	3	837	355

== Honours ==
LDU Quito

- Ecuadorian Serie A: 2010, 2018
- Recopa Sudamericana: 2010

Palmeiras

- Copa do Brasil: 2012

Cruzeiro

- Copa do Brasil: 2018

Alianza Lima

- Liga 1: 2021, 2022

Individual

- Chinese Super League Golden Boot: 2009
- Ecuadorian Serie A top scorer: 2010
- Ecuadorian Serie A top scorer: 2017
- League 1 (Peru) Best player of the year: 2021, 2022
