= Artur (footballer, born 1984) =

Brazilian footballer

Personal information
- Full name: José Artur Barbosa de Oliveira
- Date of birth: 22 October 1984 (age 42)
- Place of birth: Ibititá, Brazil
- Height: 1.83 m (6 ft 0 in)
- Position: Right-back

Senior career*
Years	Team	Apps	(Gls)
2007	Central-BA		
2007–2008	Vitória da Conquista		
2008–2009	Mirassol		
2009–2013	São Caetano	81	(15)
2012	→ Palmeiras (loan)	25	(0)
2013	→ Ponte Preta (loan)	17	(2)
2014	Figueirense	0	(0)
- * Club domestic league appearances and goals

José Artur Barbosa de Oliveira (born 22 October 1984) is a Brazilian former professional footballer who played as a right-back. He began his career as a centre-back.

== Honours ==
Palmeiras

- Copa do Brasil: 2012
