= Mazinho (footballer, born 1987) =

Brazilian footballer

Personal information
- Full name: Anderson Soares da Silva
- Date of birth: 16 October 1987 (age 39)
- Place of birth: Barbosa Ferraz, Paraná, Brazil
- Height: 5 ft 5 in (1.65 m)
- Positions: Forward; winger

Senior career*
Years	Team	Apps	(Gls)
2008–2012	Oeste	68	(12)
2009	→ Marília (loan)	8	(1)
2009	→ Noroeste (loan)	0	(0)
2010	→São Caetano (loan)	8	(1)
2011	→ América-RN (loan)	14	(2)
2012–2017	Palmeiras	61	(9)
2013	→ Vissel Kobe (loan)	39	(10)
2015	→ Coritiba (loan)	7	(1)
2015–2016	→ Oeste (loan)	67	(12)
2016	→ Santa Cruz (loan)	6	(0)
2017	→ Oeste (loan)	57	(19)
2018–2020	Oeste	112	(13)
- * Club domestic league appearances and goals as of 3 June 2015

Anderson Soares da Silva, best known as Mazinho (born October 16, 1987 in Barbosa Ferraz) is a Brazilian footballer who plays as a winger.

== Club career ==
In 2012, Mazinho signed a loan with Palmeiras. He won the 2012 Copa do Brasil with Palmeiras, and scored twice in the semi-final against Grêmio.

On 28 January 2013, Mazinho signed a loan with Vissel Kobe.

Mazinho joined Oeste, where he became the leading goal-scorer of the 2016 Campeonato Brasileiro Série B.

== Honours ==
Oeste

- Campeonato Paulista do Interior de Futebol: 2011

Palmeiras

- Copa do Brasil: 2012

== See also ==
- List of Sociedade Esportiva Palmeiras players
