= Betinho (footballer, born May 1987) =

Brazilian footballer

Personal information
- Full name: Carlos Alberto Santos da Silva
- Date of birth: May 13, 1987 (age 39)
- Place of birth: Recife, Brazil
- Height: 6 ft 1 in (1.85 m)
- Position: Forward

Team information
- Current team: Altos

Youth career
- Náutico

Senior career*
Years	Team	Apps	(Gls)
2005–2006	Náutico	33	(7)
2006–2008	Gil Vicente	32	(1)
2008	Marília	32	(5)
2009	São Caetano	17	(0)
2009–2010	→ Fortaleza (loan)	24	(11)
2010	→ Coritiba (loan)	11	(3)
2011	Vila Nova	32	(9)
2012	São Caetano	7	(1)
2012	Palmeiras	13	(1)
2013	Boa Esporte	7	(1)
2013–2014	Avaí	17	(6)
2014–2015	Santa Cruz	28	(10)
2015–2016	Paysandu	16	(6)
2017	Cuiabá	5	(0)
2017	Independente Tucuruí	7	(2)
2018	ASA	7	(2)
2019	Confiança	5	(1)
2020	Altos	5	(2)
2020	Maranhão	2	(0)
2020–	Altos	29	(10)
- * Club domestic league appearances and goals as of 22:10, 17 April 2021 (UTC)

Carlos Alberto Santos da Silva (born May 13, 1987 in Recife), also known as Betinho, is a Brazilian professional footballer who plays as a forward for Altos.

== Career ==
In May 2012, Betinho signs for 3 months with Palmeiras, with right to extend the contract.

== Honours ==
Fortaleza

- Campeonato Cearense: 2010

Coritiba

- Campeonato Brasileiro Série B: 2010

Palmeiras

- Copa do Brasil: 2012

Santa Cruz

- Campeonato Pernambucano: 2015

Paysandu

- Campeonato Paraense: 2016

Cuiabá

- Copa Verde: 2016
- Campeonato Mato-Grossense: 2017
