= Maurício Ramos (Brazilian footballer) =

Brazilian footballer (born 1985)

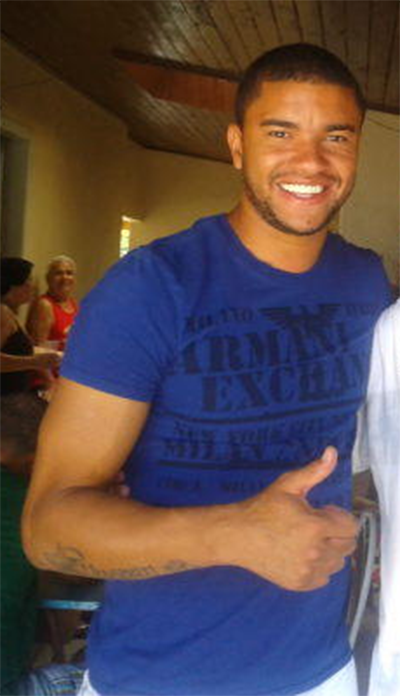
- Ramos in 2012

Personal information
- Full name: Maurício Donizete Ramos Júnior
- Date of birth: April 10, 1985 (age 41)
- Place of birth: Piracicaba, Brazil
- Height: 1.85 m (6 ft 1 in)
- Position: Centre back

Youth career
- 1998–2002: XV de Piracicaba

Senior career*
Years	Team	Apps	(Gls)
2003	XV de Piracicaba	5	(0)
2004	Independente de Limeira	20	(7)
2005–2009	Iraty	15	(6)
2006–2007	→ São Caetano (loan)	6	(0)
2008	→ Coritiba (loan)	34	(3)
2009–2013	Palmeiras	99	(7)
2013–2016	Al Sharjah	69	(3)
2016–2017	Adanaspor	29	(1)
2017–2018	Çaykur Rizespor	14	(0)
2018–2019	Al-Sailiya	19	(1)
2019	Chapecoense	17	(1)
2020–2021	Vitória	31	(0)
2021	XV de Piracicaba	1	(0)
- * Club domestic league appearances and goals

Maurício Donizete Ramos Júnior (born April 10, 1985 in Piracicaba) is a Brazilian former footballer who plays as a centre back.

== Honours ==
=== Club ===
Coritiba

- Paraná State Championship: 2008

Palmeiras

- Copa do Brasil: 2012
