= Rayllan =

Brazilian footballer

Personal information
- Full name: Rayllan Campos Santos
- Date of birth: 10 June 1989 (age 37)
- Place of birth: Aiquara, Brazil
- Height: 1.78 m (5 ft 10 in)
- Position: Attacking midfielder

Team information
- Current team: Juazeirense

Senior career*
Years	Team	Apps	(Gls)
2011–2013	Bahia de Feira	28	(4)
2012	→ Atlético Goianiense (loan)	11	(3)
2014	Potiguar Mossoró	14	(4)
2015–2016	Grêmio Novorizontino	24	(4)
2016	Sampaio Corrêa	10	(0)
2017	Rio Claro	2	(0)
2017	Portuguesa RJ	7	(1)
2018	Treze	6	(0)
2019–2020	Portuguesa Santista	19	(2)
2019	→ Doce Mel EC (loan)		
2019	→ Bahia de Feira (loan)		
2021–	Juazeirense	5	(0)
- * Club domestic league appearances and goals as of 2 November 2021

Rayllan Campos Santos (born 10 June 1989) is a Brazilian footballer who plays as an attacking midfielder for Portuguesa Santista.

He played for Atlético Goianiense in the top level of Brazilian football in 2012. He made his debut at the as a substitute in the fourth round game against Portuguesa on 10 June, and his full debut on 11 August against Santos.

Rayllan also represented Sampaio Corrêa in 2016 Campeonato Brasileiro Série B. He has had two spells in Campeonato Brasileiro Série D, for his first club Bahia de Feira in 2011, and for Treze in 2018.
