= Daniel Lovinho =

Brazilian footballer (born 1989)

Personal information
- Full name: Daniel Santos Silva
- Date of birth: January 9, 1989 (age 37)
- Place of birth: São Paulo, Brazil
- Height: 1.72 m (5 ft 7 1/2 in)
- Position: Forward

Youth career
- 2004–2008: Palmeiras

Senior career*
Years	Team	Apps	(Gls)
2007–2008	Palmeiras B		
2009–2013	Palmeiras	4	(0)
2010	→ Goiás (loan)	3	(0)
2010	→ Ponte Preta (loan)	11	(1)
2011	→ América-MG (loan)	5	(0)
2011	→ Ipatinga (loan)	4	(0)
2011	→ Terengganu (loan)	0	(0)
2013	→ Linense (loan)	10	(1)
2013–2014	Thespakusatsu Gunma	49	(16)
2015–2016	Kyoto Sanga	48	(6)
2017	Seoul E-Land	15	(0)
- * Club domestic league appearances and goals as of 14 January 2018

Daniel Santos Silva or simply Daniel Lovinho (born January 9, 1989) is a Brazilian footballer who plays as a forward.

== Career ==
Daniel Lovinho arrived at Palmeiras in 2004, aged 15. He played in the Copa São Paulo de Futebol Júnior, where he excelled and moved up to first team, scoring 14 goals in 2008.

He made his debut for his team against the Santo André in the Campeonato Paulista on January 21, 2009, when he replaced Diego Souza. His first game as a starter was against Coritiba, also in 2009.

In 2010, he was loaned to Goiás for one year.

The team of Goiás returned him to Palmeiras for an unknown reasons, then he went out on loan again to Ponte Preta for one year. On September 28, 2010, Lovinho made his first career goal, closing the scoring in a tie with Coritiba.

He played for Japanese side Kyoto Sanga in the 2015 and 2016 seasons.

== Club statistics ==
Updated to 14 February 2017.

Club performance			League		Cup		Total	
Season	Club	League	Apps	Goals	Apps	Goals	Apps	Goals
Japan			League		Emperor's Cup		Total	
2013	Thespakusatsu Gunma	J2 League	12	2	1	1	13	3
2014	Thespakusatsu Gunma	J2 League	37	14	2	1	39	15
2015	Kyoto Sanga FC	J2 League	15	2	0	0	15	2
2016	Kyoto Sanga FC	J2 League	33	4	0	0	33	4
Total			97	22	3	2	100	24
