= Leandro (footballer, born April 1979) =

Brazilian footballer

Personal information
- Full name: Leandro da Silva Wanderley
- Date of birth: 19 April 1979 (age 47)
- Place of birth: Rio de Janeiro, Brazil
- Height: 1.76 m (5 ft 9 in)
- Position: Left back

Team information
- Current team: Cabofriense

Youth career
- 1995–1996: América-RJ

Senior career*
| Years | Team | Apps | (Gls) |
| 1997–1998 | América-RJ | 47 | (5) |
| 1999–2002 | Vitória | 68 | (2) |
| 2002–2004 | Cruzeiro | 101 | (4) |
| 2005–2010 | Porto | 10 | (1) |
| 2005–2007 | → Cruzeiro (loan) | 17 | (0) |
| 2007–2008 | → Palmeiras (loan) | 67 | (4) |
| 2009 | → Fluminense (loan) | 0 | (0) |
| 2009 | → Vitória (loan) | 29 | (1) |
| 2010 | → Atlético Mineiro (loan) | 23 | (0) |
| 2011 | Atlético Mineiro | 6 | (0) |
| 2012 | América-RJ | | |
| 2012 | Palmeiras | 4 | (0) |
| 2013– | Cabofriense | 22 | (1) |
- * Club domestic league appearances and goals as of 12 April 2015

Leandro da Silva Wanderley (born 19 April 1979), simply known as Leandro, is a Brazilian footballer who plays for Associação Desportiva Cabofriense as a left back.

== Football career ==
Born in Rio de Janeiro, Leandro made his professional debuts at the age of 18, with hometown's América Football Club. Two years later he joined Esporte Clube Vitória and, in 2002, moved to Cruzeiro Esporte Clube. In the latter club, he was an undisputed starter in the 2003 season, as the team won both the league and cup trophies.

In January 2005, Leandro moved to Europe and signed with Portugal's FC Porto. He made his league debut on the 15th in a 0–0 away draw against Académica de Coimbra but, failing to adjust, he returned to his country on loan shortly after, spending two years with former team Cruzeiro.

Deemed surplus to requirements at Porto, Leandro continued in the same predicament in the following years, always in his country. On 4 October 2008, in a match against Clube Atlético Mineiro, he completed 100 official games for Sociedade Esportiva Palmeiras, being honored with a No. 100 jersey; subsequently he represented Fluminense Football Club, Vitória and Atlético Mineiro.

On 4 September 2012, Palmeiras confirmed that Leandro signed a four-month contract. Only two months later, however, he was released.

== Honours ==
Vitória

- Nordeste Cup: 1999
- Bahia State League: 2000
- Bahia State Superleague: 2002

Cruzeiro

- Minas Gerais State League: 2003, 2004, 2006
- Brazilian Cup: 2003
- Brazilian League: 2003

Palmeiras

- São Paulo State League: 2008
