= Pierre (footballer, born 1982) =

Brazilian footballer

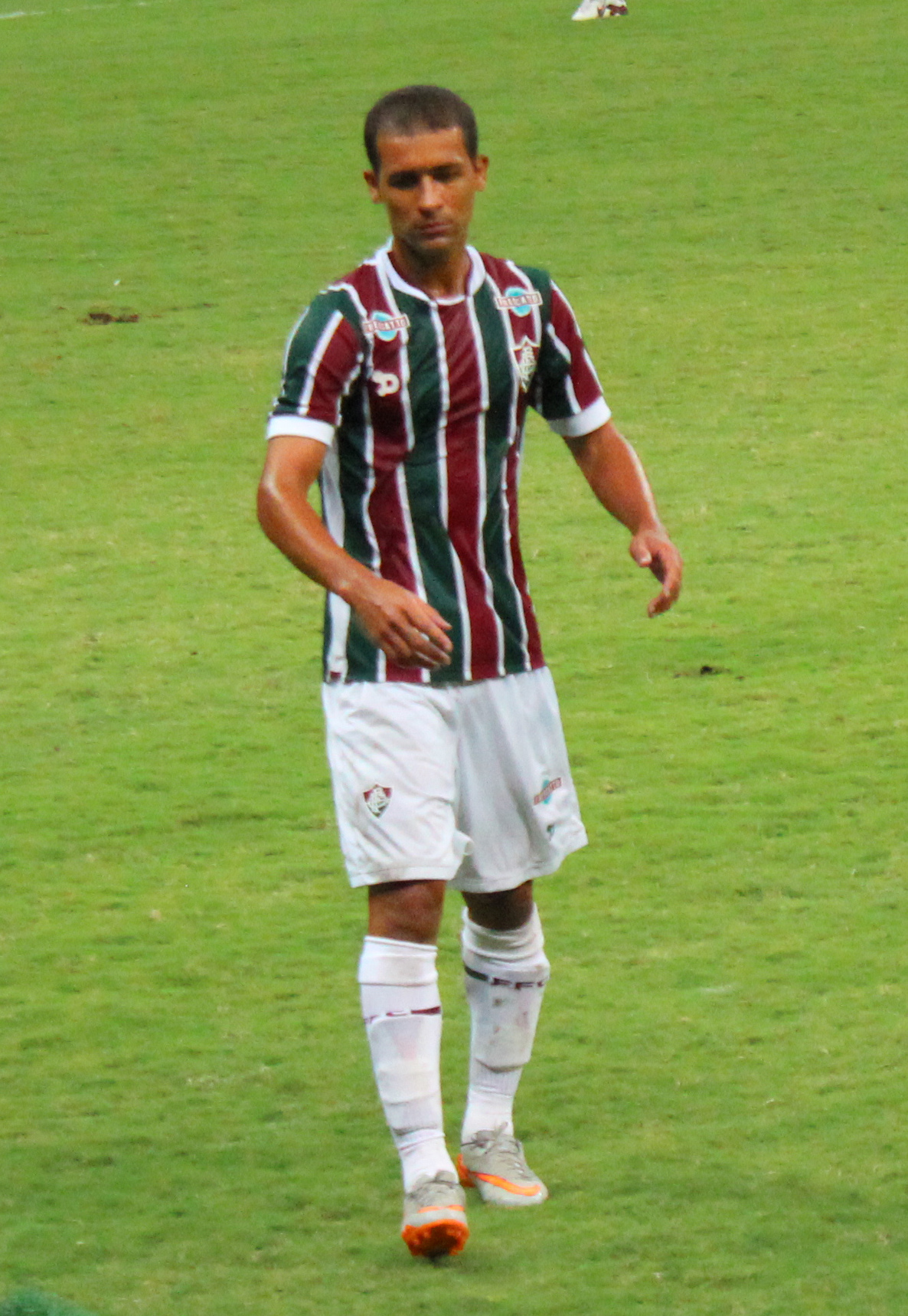
- Pierre with Fluminense in 2016

Personal information
- Full name: Lucas Pierre Santos Oliveira
- Date of birth: 19 January 1982 (age 44)
- Place of birth: Itororó, Brazil
- Height: 1.72 m (5 ft 8 in)
- Position: Defensive midfielder

Youth career
- 2000–2002: Vitória

Senior career*
Years	Team	Apps	(Gls)
2002–2006	Ituano	32	(1)
2003	→ Paraná (loan)	31	(1)
2005	→ Paraná (loan)	14	(0)
2006	Paraná	18	(0)
2007–2011	Palmeiras	96	(2)
2011	→ Atlético Mineiro (loan)	19	(0)
2012–2015	Atlético Mineiro	83	(0)
2015–2017	Fluminense	37	(0)
- * Club domestic league appearances and goals

Lucas Pierre Santos Oliveira (born 19 January 1982), known as Pierre, is a former Brazilian footballer who played as a defensive midfielder.

== Honours ==
Vitória

- Bahia State League: 2000

Ituano

- São Paulo State League: 2002

Palmeiras

- São Paulo State League: 2008

Atlético Mineiro

- Minas Gerais State League: 2012, 2013
- Copa Libertadores: 2013
- Recopa Sudamericana: 2014
- Copa do Brasil: 2014

Fluminense

- Primeira Liga: 2016
