= Obina =

Brazilian footballer (born 1983)

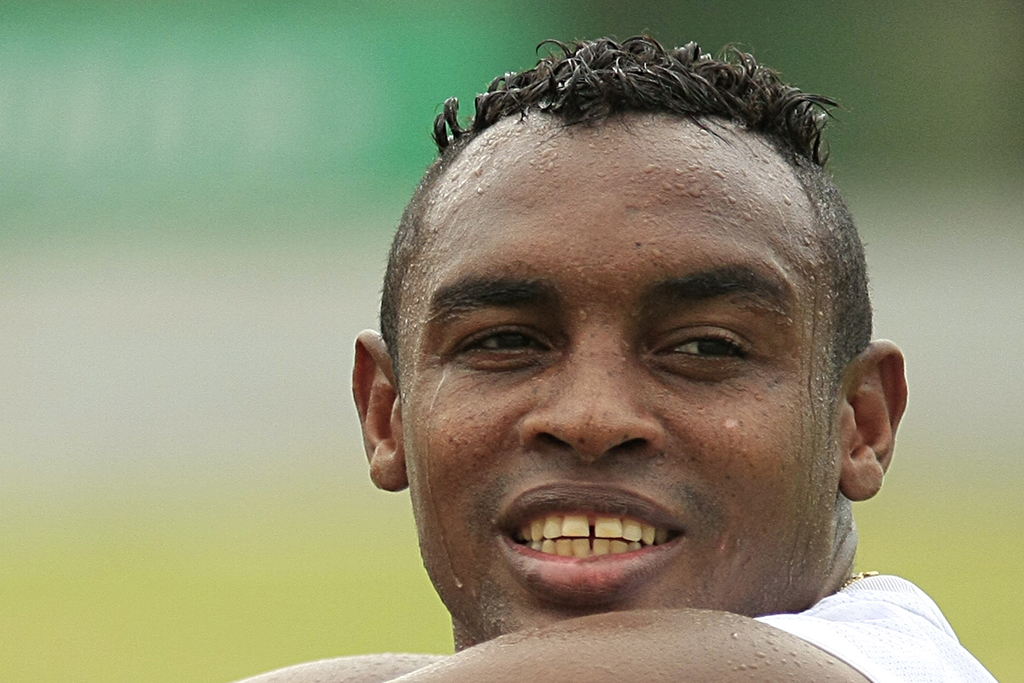

Personal information
- Full name: Manuel de Brito Filho
- Date of birth: 31 January 1983 (age 43)
- Place of birth: Vera Cruz, Bahia, Brazil
- Height: 1.83 m (6 ft 0 in)
- Position: Striker

Youth career
- 2001: Vitória

Senior career*
Years	Team	Apps	(Gls)
2002–2004	Vitória	40	(19)
2003	→ Flu de Feira (loan)	0	(0)
2003	→ CRB (loan)	-	(-)
2005	Al-Ittihad	-	(-)
2005–2010	Flamengo	112	(28)
2009	→ Palmeiras (loan)	27	(12)
2010	Atlético Mineiro	24	(12)
2011–2013	Shandong Luneng	34	(15)
2012	→ Palmeiras (loan)	24	(2)
2013	→ Bahia (loan)	13	(3)
2014	América Mineiro	24	(13)
2015–2016	Matsumoto Yamaga	36	(6)
Total		334	(110)
- * Club domestic league appearances and goals as of 31 July 2018

Manuel de Brito Filho, better known as Obina (born January 31, 1983), is a Brazilian former football striker.

== Career ==
=== Vitória ===
Obina caught attention in 2004 when he made a solid season, despite the relegation of his club, Vitória. He scored 24 goals that season, 19 in the Brazilian Série A, being the top scorer of the team along with Edílson. At the end of that year he has been transferred to Al-Ittihad.

=== Flamengo ===
Flamengo's supporters like to refer to him as the Brazilian Samuel Eto'o (they usually chant ôôôô... Obina é melhor que o Eto'o, "Obina is better than Eto'o"), a joke-reference to the Cameroonian and former Chelsea FC player. Obina was fundamental in helping Flamengo win the 2006 Brazilian Cup. He has often been compared with Fio Maravilha for his folkloric charm. Kléber Leite, Flamengo's Director of Football, once referred to him as being "culturally naive."

During Flamengo's Taça Guanabara semi-final match against Vasco da Gama on February 25, 2007, Obina injured his left knee's anterior cruciate ligament after scoring in the second minute of the match. Flamengo's doctors estimated that he will be out of action for six months.

Just a few games after his awaited return, Obina was suspended for 120 days after hitting Internacional's player Índio with his elbow during Flamengo's match against that team on 8 September 2007.

In the two final games of the 2008 Campeonato Carioca, Obina scored three goals against Botafogo and led Flamengo to win its 30th championship.

=== Palmeiras ===
Obina was loaned to Palmeiras on May 25, 2009 until the end of the 2009 season. He debuted for Palmeiras on May 29, 2009 in a Copa Libertadores game against Nacional, scoring his first goal for the club on 31 May 2009, in a Série A game against Barueri.

Obina scored his first hat-trick for Palmeiras on 26 July 2009 against rivals Corinthians, his club won 3-0.

On November 18, 2009 Obina was involved in some trouble with his teammate Maurício, both argued and tried to hit each other after the incident. Both were resigned from the club with two matches left to play in the season.

=== Return to Palmeiras ===
In July 2012 Obina returned to Palmeiras for a six-month loan in which the São Paulo club shelled out $300 thousand (R $626,000).

On July 22, 2012, shook the Nautical networks in victory by 3-0, this being his first goal after the return to Palmeiras . His poor performance, along with the entire team, which culminated with Palmeiras relegation to Serie B in 2013 led to the board of directors desist to renew with the player, following the Palestra Italia only until December, when it closes your loan agreement. On 29 November 2012, along with four other companions, was officially dismissed from the club.

=== Atlético Mineiro ===
After a very brief stay in Flamengo, for merely two weeks (the first two of 2010), Obina signed a three years contract with Atlético Mineiro prior to their first official game of the season, against América Mineiro, on 24 January 2010. The contract grants Atlético Mineiro 50% of the rights over Obina, and it cost the club approximately 700,000 euros.

=== China ===
On January 21, 2011, the Atletico Mineiro announced through its official website that Obina was sold to Shandong Luneng to play for Shandong Taishan F.C. Atletico received only, according to the contract, the amount on the window rate.

=== América Mineiro ===
He was signed to América Futebol Clube in 2014. He scored twice against his former club Atletico Mineiro, but they ended up losing the game by turning 3 to 2. Before Vasco da Gama, Obina scored the goal that secured the tie for América Mineiro in a match valid for the Brazilian Championship. Before his former club Bahia, scored a penalty goal that opened the scoring for the Coelho, but the team eventually lost the match 2-1.

=== Bahia ===
Obina was loaned to Bahia from January to December 2013. Opened on March 17, 2013, against Vitória da Conquista, match that ended in a draw 1 to 1. He scored his first goal in the club's match against Juazeirense on March 24, 2013.

=== Career statistics ===
(Correct as of May 5, 2011)

Club	Season	State League		Brazilian Série A		Copa do Brasil		Copa Libertadores		Copa Sudamericana		Total	
Club	Season	Apps	Goals	Apps	Goals	Apps	Goals	Apps	Goals	Apps	Goals	Apps	Goals
Vitória	2004	-	-	40	19	9	5	-	-	-	-	49	24
Vitória	Total	0	0	40	19	9	5	0	0	0	0	49	24
Flamengo	2005	-	-	27	6	2	1	-	-	-	-	29	7
Flamengo	2006	3	0	30	11	8	4	-	-	-	-	41	15
Flamengo	2007	5	3	23	4	-	-	2	2	-	-	30	9
Flamengo	2008	17	7	31	7	-	-	7	1	-	-	55	15
Flamengo	2009	11	0	1	0	5	0	-	-	-	-	17	0
Flamengo	Total	36	10	112	28	15	5	9	3	0	0	172	46
Palmeiras (loan)	2009	-	-	27	12	-	-	2	0	-	-	29	12
Palmeiras (loan)	Total	0	0	27	12	0	0	2	0	0	0	29	12
Flamengo	2010	2	0	-	-	-	-	-	-	-	-	2	0
Flamengo	Total	2	0	0	0	0	0	0	0	0	0	2	0
Atlético Mineiro	2010	3	3	24	12	3	5	-	-	3	3	33	23
Atlético Mineiro	Total	3	3	24	12	3	5	0	0	3	3	33	23
Club	Season	–		Chinese Super League		Cup		Continental		Other		Total	
Club	Season	Apps	Goals	Apps	Goals	Apps	Goals	Apps	Goals	Apps	Goals	Apps	Goals
Shandong Luneng	2011	-	-	25	10	3	0	6	2	-	-	34	12
Shandong Luneng	Total	-	-	25	10	3	0	6	2	0	0	34	12
Career total		41	13	228	79	30	15	22	5	3	3	319	117

according to combined sources on the Flamengo official website and Flaestatística.

== Honours ==
Vitória

- Bahia State Championship: 2004(7 goals)

Flamengo

- Copa do Brasil: 2006
- Taça Guanabara: 2007, 2008
- Taça Rio: 2009
- Rio de Janeiro State League: 2007, 2008, 2009
- Campeonato Brasileiro: 2009

Atlético Mineiro

- Minas Gerais State League: 2010
