= 2012 Copa do Brasil =

Copa Kia do Brasil 2012

Tournament details
- Country: Brazil
- Dates: March 7 - July 11
- Teams: 64

Final positions
- Champions: (São Paulo (state)) Palmeiras
- Runners-up: (Paraná (state)) Coritiba

Tournament statistics
- Matches played: 112
- Goals scored: 319 (2.85 per match)
- Top goal scorer: (Brazil) Luís Fabiano (São Paulo) (8 goals)

The 2012 Copa do Brasil (officially the Copa Kia do Brasil 2012 for sponsorship reasons) was the 24th edition of the Copa do Brasil. It began on March 7 and ended on July 11. The competition was contested by 64 teams, either qualified through their respective state championships (54) or by the CBF Rankings (10). Clubs that qualify for the 2012 Copa Libertadores (like the current champion, Vasco da Gama) did not take part because of scheduling conflicts.

The cup winner qualifies for the 2013 Copa Libertadores.

== Format ==
The competition is a single elimination knockout tournament featuring two-legged ties. In the first two rounds, if the away team wins the first match by 2 or more goals, it progresses straight to the next round avoiding the second leg. The away goals rule is also used in the Copa do Brasil. The winner qualifies for the 2013 Copa Libertadores, which prevents a team from winning the Copa do Brasil twice in a row.

== Qualified teams ==
=== Qualified by state championships and other competitions ===
54 spots in the tournament are destinated to all the 27 State federations to indicate either one, two or three clubs, depending on their status in CBF State ranking. Criteria may vary, but usually state federations indicate clubs with best records in the state championships or other special competitions organized by such institutions.

Teams in italics may qualify for the Copa Libertadores.

State	Team	Qualification method
(Acre (state)) Acre; 1 berth	Rio Branco	2011 Campeonato Acreano champions
(Alagoas) Alagoas; 2 berths	ASA	2011 Campeonato Alagoano champions
(Alagoas) Alagoas; 2 berths	Coruripe	2011 Campeonato Alagoano runners-up
(Amapá) Amapá; 1 berth	Trem	2011 Campeonato Amapaense champions
(Amazonas (Brazilian state)) Amazonas; 2 berths	Penarol	2011 Campeonato Amazonense champions
(Amazonas (Brazilian state)) Amazonas; 2 berths	Nacional	2011 Campeonato Amazonense runners-up
(Bahia) Bahia; 2 berths	Bahia de Feira	2011 Campeonato Baiano champions
(Bahia) Bahia; 2 berths	Vitória	2011 Campeonato Baiano runners-up
(Ceará) Ceará; 2 berths	Ceará	2011 Campeonato Cearense champions
(Ceará) Ceará; 2 berths	Horizonte	2011 Copa Fares Lopes champions
(Federal District (Brazil)) Distrito Federal; 2 berths	Brasiliense	2011 Campeonato Brasiliense champions
(Federal District (Brazil)) Distrito Federal; 2 berths	Gama	2011 Campeonato Brasiliense runners-up
(Espírito Santo) Espírito Santo; 2 berths	São Mateus	2011 Campeonato Capixaba champions
(Espírito Santo) Espírito Santo; 2 berths	Real Noroeste	2011 Copa Espírito Santo champions
(Goiás) Goiás; 2 berths	Atlético-GO	2011 Campeonato Goiano champions
(Goiás) Goiás; 2 berths	Goiás	2011 Campeonato Goiano runners-up
(Maranhão) Maranhão; 2 berths	Santa Quitéria	2011 Copa União do Maranhão champions
(Maranhão) Maranhão; 2 berths	Sampaio Corrêa	2011 Campeonato Maranhense champions
(Mato Grosso) Mato Grosso; 2 berths	Cuiabá	2011 Campeonato Mato-Grossense champions
(Mato Grosso) Mato Grosso; 2 berths	Luverdense	2011 Copa Governador do Mato Grosso champions
(Mato Grosso do Sul) Mato Grosso do Sul; 2 berths	CENE	2011 Campeonato Sul-Mato-Grossense champions
(Mato Grosso do Sul) Mato Grosso do Sul; 2 berths	Aquidauanense	2011 Campeonato Sul-Mato-Grossense runners-up
(Minas Gerais) Minas Gerais; 3 berths	Cruzeiro	2011 Campeonato Mineiro champions
(Minas Gerais) Minas Gerais; 3 berths	Atlético Mineiro	2011 Campeonato Mineiro runners-up
(Minas Gerais) Minas Gerais; 3 berths	Ipatinga	2011 Taça Minas Gerais champions
(Pará) Pará; 2 berths	Independente	2011 Campeonato Paraense champions
(Pará) Pará; 2 berths	Paysandu	2011 Campeonato Paraense runners-up
(Paraíba) Paraíba; 2 berths	Treze	2011 Campeonato Paraibano champions
(Paraíba) Paraíba; 2 berths	Auto Esporte	2011 Copa Paraíba champions
(Paraná (state)) Paraná; 3 berths	Coritiba	2011 Campeonato Paranaense champions
(Paraná (state)) Paraná; 3 berths	Atlético Paranaense	2011 Campeonato Paranaense runners-up
(Paraná (state)) Paraná; 3 berths	Operário	2011 Campeonato Paranaense 3rd place
(Pernambuco) Pernambuco; 2 berths	Santa Cruz	2011 Campeonato Pernambucano champions
(Pernambuco) Pernambuco; 2 berths	Sport	2011 Campeonato Pernambucano runners-up
(Piauí) Piauí; 2 berths	4 de Julho	2011 Campeonato Piauiense champions
(Piauí) Piauí; 2 berths	Comercial	2011 Campeonato Piauiense runners-up
(Rio de Janeiro (state)) Rio de Janeiro; 3 berths	Botafogo	2011 Campeonato Carioca 3rd
(Rio de Janeiro (state)) Rio de Janeiro; 3 berths	Boavista	2011 Campeonato Carioca 4th
(Rio de Janeiro (state)) Rio de Janeiro; 3 berths	Madureira	2011 Copa Rio champions
(Rio Grande do Norte) Rio Grande do Norte; 2 berths	ABC	2011 Campeonato Potiguar champions
(Rio Grande do Norte) Rio Grande do Norte; 2 berths	Santa Cruz	2011 Campeonato Potiguar runners-up
(Rio Grande do Sul) Rio Grande do Sul; 3 berths	Grêmio	2011 Campeonato Gaúcho runners-up
(Rio Grande do Sul) Rio Grande do Sul; 3 berths	Juventude	2011 Campeonato Gaúcho 3rd
(Rio Grande do Sul) Rio Grande do Sul; 3 berths	Sapucaiense	2010 Copa FGF 3rd
(Rondônia) Rondônia; 1 berth	Espigão	2011 Campeonato Rondoniense champions
(Roraima) Roraima; 1 berth	Real	2011 Campeonato Roraimense champions
(São Paulo (state)) São Paulo; 3 berths	Palmeiras	2011 Campeonato Paulista 3rd
(São Paulo (state)) São Paulo; 3 berths	São Paulo	2011 Campeonato Paulista 4th
(São Paulo (state)) São Paulo; 3 berths	Paulista	2011 Copa Paulista champions
(Santa Catarina (state)) Santa Catarina; 2 berths	Chapecoense	2011 Campeonato Catarinense champions
(Santa Catarina (state)) Santa Catarina; 2 berths	Criciúma	2011 Campeonato Catarinense runners-up
(Sergipe) Sergipe; 2 berths	River Plate	2011 Campeonato Sergipano champions
(Sergipe) Sergipe; 2 berths	São Domingos	2011 Campeonato Sergipano runners-up
(Tocantins) Tocantins; 1 berth	Gurupi	2011 Campeonato Tocantinense champions

=== Qualified by CBF club ranking ===
Ten spots are reserved for the top 10 clubs in CBF club ranking, excluding those qualified by state competitions and clubs playing in 2012 Copa Libertadores.

Pos.	Club	State	Points (2010)	CP	LP	PP	Current points	Maximum points	Qualification Status	Notes
1	Grêmio	(Rio Grande do Sul) RS	2.159	0	41	TBD	2.200	2.219	(SQ)	
2	Corinthians	(São Paulo (state)) SP	2.137	0	41	TBD	2.178	2.197	(DQ)	^{Note Serie A}
3	Vasco da Gama	(Rio de Janeiro (state)) RJ	2.086	30	41	TBD	2.157	2.176	(DQ)	^{Note Copa do Brasil}
4	Flamengo	(Rio de Janeiro (state)) RJ	2.086	5	41	TBD	2.132	2.151	(DQ)	^{Note Serie A}
5	São Paulo	(São Paulo (state)) SP	2.049	4	41	TBD	2.095	2.114	(SQ)	
6	Atlético Mineiro	(Minas Gerais) MG	2.032	2	41	TBD	2.075	2.094	(SQ)	
7	Palmeiras	(São Paulo (state)) SP	2.012	5	41	TBD	2.058	2.177	(SQ)	
8	Internacional	(Rio Grande do Sul) RS	1.996	0	41	TBD	2.037	2.056	(DQ)	^{Note Serie A}
9	Cruzeiro	(Minas Gerais) MG	1.950	0	41	TBD	1.991	2.010	(SQ)	
10	Santos	(São Paulo (state)) SP	1.829	0	41	TBD	1.870	1.889	(DQ)	^{Note Copa Libertadores}
11	Fluminense	(Rio de Janeiro (state)) RJ	1.723	0	41	TBD	1.764	1.783	(DQ)	^{Note Serie A}
12	Botafogo	(Rio de Janeiro (state)) RJ	1.672	3	41	TBD	1.716	1.735	(SQ)	
13	Coritiba	(Paraná (state)) PR	1.515	20	41	TBD	1.576	1.595	(SQ)	
14	Goiás	(Goiás) GO	1.523	3	21	TBD	1.547	1.566	(SQ)	
15	Guarani	(São Paulo (state)) SP	1.516	2	21	TBD	1.539	1.558	(Q)	
16	Sport Recife	(Pernambuco) PE	1.501	1	21	TBD	1.523	1.542	(SQ)	
17	Portuguesa	(São Paulo (state)) SP	1.405	1	21	19	1.446	1.446	(Q)	
18	Atlético Paranaense	(Paraná (state)) PR	1.379	5	41	TBD	1.425	1.444	(SQ)	
19	Bahia	(Bahia) BA	1.358	3	41	TBD	1.402	1.421	(Q)	
20	Vitória	(Bahia) BA	1.355	1	21	TBD	1.357	1.396	(SQ)	
21	Náutico	(Pernambuco) PE	1.207	3	21	TBD	1.231	1.277	(Q)	
22	Santa Cruz	(Pernambuco) PE	1.140	2	1	TBD	1.143	1.152	(SQ)	
23	Paraná	(Paraná (state)) PR	1.080	2	21	TBD	1.103	1.132	(Q)	
24	Ceará	(Ceará) CE	1.055	10	41	TBD	1.106	1.125	(SQ)	
25	Ponte Preta	(São Paulo (state)) SP	1.047	2	21	TBD	1.070	1.089	(Q)	
26	Juventude	(Rio Grande do Sul) RS	0.867	0	1	TBD	0.868	0.877	(SQ)	
27	Remo	(Pará) PA	0.855	0	0	TBD	0.855	0.865	(Q)	
28	Criciúma	(Santa Catarina (state)) SC	0.706	0	21	TBD	0.727	0.746	(SQ)	
28	Fortaleza	(Ceará) CE	0.724	2	1	TBD	0.727	0.746	(Q)	
29	América de Natal	(Rio Grande do Norte) RN	0.725	0	1	TBD	0.726	0.745	(Q)	
31	Paysandu	(Pará) PA	0.672	2	1	TBD	0.675	0.794	(SQ)	
32	América Mineiro	(Minas Gerais) MG	0.614	0	41	1	0.656	0.656	(Q)	
32	Figueirense	(Santa Catarina (state)) SC	0.601	0	41	13	0.655	0.656	(I)	

Symbols:

CP: Points for 2011 Copa do Brasil (1st round 1 pt, 2nd round 2 pts, 3rd round 3 pts, quarterfinals 5 pts, semifinals 10 pts, runners-up 20 pts, winner 30 pts) LP: Minimum points for Campeonato Brasileiro (41 for Série A,21 for Série B, 1 for Série C and D)PP: Additional points for position (Série A and B: 1st 19 points, ..., 20th 0 Points; Série C: 1st 19 points, ..., 10th 10 points, 11th-20th 0 point, Série D: 1st 9 points,...9th 1 Point) (Q) Qualified via ranking; (TQ) Qualified via ranking or via state competition; (SQ) Qualified via state competition; (E) Eligible for qualification via state competition; (I) Ineligible for qualification via state competition; (DQ) Ineligible because qualified for Copa Libertadores.
Notes:

- Santos qualified for 2012 Copa Libertadores via 2011 Copa Libertadores.
- Vasco da Gama qualified for 2012 Copa Libertadores via 2011 Copa do Brasil.
- Corinthians, Fluminense, Flamengo and Internacional qualified for 2012 Copa Libertadores via 2011 Campeonato Brasileiro Série A.

== Bracket ==
Teams that play in their home stadium in the first leg are marked with †.

First Phase
(São Paulo (state)) Palmeiras	1	3
(Alagoas) Coruripe †	0	0
(Rio Grande do Norte) América de Natal †	0	2 (2)
(Ceará) Horizonte †	2	0 (4)
Ceará	2	-
(Federal District (Brazil)) Gama †	0	-
(Paraná (state)) Paraná	2	2
(Mato Grosso) Luverdense †	2	0
(Minas Gerais) Cruzeiro	6	-
(Acre (state)) Rio Branco †	0	-
(Santa Catarina (state)) Chapecoense	1	3
(Espírito Santo) São Mateus †	2	1
(Paraná (state)) Atlético Paranaense	1	1
(Maranhão) Sampaio Corrêa †	2	0
(Santa Catarina (state)) Criciúma	2	-
(Rio de Janeiro (state)) Madureira †	0	-
(Rio Grande do Sul) Grêmio	3	3
(Sergipe) River Plate †	2	1
(Minas Gerais) Ipatinga	2	-
(Espírito Santo) Real Noroeste †	0	-
(Pernambuco) Náutico	3	-
(Rio Grande do Norte) Santa Cruz-RN †	1	-
(Ceará) Fortaleza	3	3
(Piauí) Comercial-PI †	2	0
Bahia	3	-
(Paraíba) Auto Esporte-PB †	0	-
(Pará) Remo	0	3
(Roraima) Real †	0	0
(São Paulo (state)) Portuguesa	1	4
(Mato Grosso) Cuiabá †	1	0
(Rio Grande do Sul) Juventude	4	-
(Paraná (state)) Operário-PR †	0	-
(São Paulo (state)) São Paulo	1	4
(Pará) Independente †	0	0
Bahia de Feira	0	2
(Mato Grosso do Sul) Aquidauanense †	1	0
(Goiás) Atlético Goianiense	1	4
(Tocantins) Gurupi †	0	2
(São Paulo (state)) Ponte Preta	0	5
(Rio Grande do Sul) Sapucaiense †	0	2
(Minas Gerais) Atlético Mineiro	3	-
(Mato Grosso do Sul) CENE †	1	-
(Pernambuco) Santa Cruz	2	1
(Amazonas (Brazilian state)) Penarol †	2	2
(Minas Gerais) América Mineiro	0	2
(Rio de Janeiro (state)) Boavista †	0	1
Goiás	3	3
(São Paulo (state)) Paulista †	2	0
(Paraná (state)) Coritiba	0	2
(Amazonas (Brazilian state)) Nacional †	0	0
(Alagoas) ASA	3	2
(Maranhão) Santa Quitéria †	2	1
(Pernambuco) Sport	2	-
(Piauí) 4 de Julho †	0	-
(Pará) Paysandu	3	-
(Rondônia) Espigão †	1	-
(Rio de Janeiro (state)) Botafogo	1	1 (3)
(Paraíba) Treze †	1	1 (2)
(São Paulo (state)) Guarani	0	3
(Federal District (Brazil)) Brasiliense †	2	0
(Bahia) Vitória	0	2
(Sergipe) São Domingos †	0	0
(Rio Grande do Norte) ABC	5	-
(Amapá) Trem †	0	-

Second Phase
(São Paulo (state)) Palmeiras	3	-
(Ceará) Horizonte †	1	-
Ceará †	2	1
(Paraná (state)) Paraná	2	1
(Minas Gerais) Cruzeiro	1	4
(Santa Catarina (state)) Chapecoense †	1	1
(Paraná (state)) Atlético Paranaense	2	5
(Santa Catarina (state)) Criciúma †	1	1
(Rio Grande do Sul) Grêmio	1	3
(Minas Gerais) Ipatinga †	0	0
(Pernambuco) Náutico	0	2
(Ceará) Fortaleza †	4	1
Bahia	1	4
(Pará) Remo †	2	0
(São Paulo (state)) Portuguesa	0	4
(Rio Grande do Sul) Juventude †	2	0
(São Paulo (state)) São Paulo	5	-
Bahia de Feira †	2	-
(Goiás) Atlético Goianiense †	2	1 (3)
(São Paulo (state)) Ponte Preta †	1	2 (4)
(Minas Gerais) Atlético Mineiro	5	-
(Amazonas (Brazilian state)) Penarol †	0	-
(Minas Gerais) América Mineiro †	0	3
Goiás	0	4
(Paraná (state)) Coritiba	0	3
(Alagoas) ASA †	1	0
(Pernambuco) Sport	1	1
(Pará) Paysandu †	2	4
(Rio de Janeiro (state)) Botafogo	2	0
(São Paulo (state)) Guarani †	1	0
(Bahia) Vitória	1	3
(Rio Grande do Norte) ABC †	1	2

Round of 16
(São Paulo (state)) Palmeiras	2	4
(Paraná (state)) Paraná †	1	0
(Minas Gerais) Cruzeiro	0	1
(Paraná (state)) Atlético Paranaense †	1	2
(Rio Grande do Sul) Grêmio	2	2
(Ceará) Fortaleza †	0	0
Bahia	0	2
(São Paulo (state)) Portuguesa †	0	0
(São Paulo (state)) São Paulo †	0	3
(São Paulo (state)) Ponte Preta †	1	1
(Minas Gerais) Atlético Mineiro †	0	2
Goiás	2	1
(Paraná (state)) Coritiba †	4	1
(Pará) Paysandu	1	0
(Rio de Janeiro (state)) Botafogo	1	1
(Bahia) Vitória †	1	2

Quarterfinals
(São Paulo (state)) Palmeiras	2	2
(Paraná (state)) Atlético Paranaense †	2	0
(Rio Grande do Sul) Grêmio	2	2
Bahia †	1	0
(São Paulo (state)) São Paulo †	2	2
Goiás	0	2
(Paraná (state)) Coritiba	0	4
(Bahia) Vitória †	0	1

Semifinals
(Rio Grande do Sul) Grêmio †	0	1
(São Paulo (state)) Palmeiras	2	1
Finals
(São Paulo (state)) Palmeiras †	2	1
(Paraná (state)) Coritiba	0	1
(São Paulo (state)) São Paulo †	1	0
(Paraná (state)) Coritiba	0	2

== Semifinals ==
The Semifinals began on June 13 and ended on June 21.

=== Group 61 ===
June 13	Grêmio (Rio Grande do Sul)	0–2	(São Paulo (state)) Palmeiras	Estádio Olímpico, Porto Alegre
21:50 UTC−03:00		Report	Mazinho 86'; Barcos 90'	Attendance: 43,508; Referee: Héber Roberto Lopes (Paraná)

June 21	Palmeiras (São Paulo (state))	1–1	(Rio Grande do Sul) Grêmio	Arena Barueri, Barueri
21:00 UTC−03:00	Valdivia 72'	Report	Fernando 66'	Attendance: 26,255; Referee: Ricardo Marques Ribeiro (Minas Gerais)

Palmeiras advanced on points 4–1.

=== Group 62 ===
June 14	São Paulo (São Paulo (state))	1–0	(Paraná (state)) Coritiba	Estádio do Morumbi, São Paulo
21:00 UTC−03:00	Lucas 88'	Report		Attendance: 40,448; Referee: Ricardo Marques Ribeiro (Minas Gerais)

June 20	Coritiba (Paraná (state))	2–0	(São Paulo (state)) São Paulo	Estádio Major Antônio Couto Pereira, Curitiba
21:50 UTC−03:00	Émerson 28'; Éverton Ribeiro 61'	Report		Attendance: 28,244; Referee: Wilton Pereira Sampaio (Goiás)

Tied on points 3–3, Coritiba advanced on better goal difference.

== Finals ==
The Finals was played on July 5 and July 11.

Group 63

July 5, 2012
21:50 UTC−03:00

Palmeiras (São Paulo (state))	2 – 0	(Paraná (state)) Coritiba
Valdivia 45+2' (pen.); Thiago Heleno 64'	Report

Arena Barueri, Barueri
Attendance: 28,557
Referee: Wilton Pereira Sampaio (Distrito Federal)

July 11, 2012
21:50 UTC−03:00

Coritiba (Paraná (state))	1 – 1	(São Paulo (state)) Palmeiras
Ayrton 61'	Report	Betinho 65'

Estádio Major Antônio Couto Pereira, Curitiba
Attendance: 31,382
Referee: Nielson Nogueira Dias (Pernambuco)

Palmeiras won on points 4–1.

Copa do Brasil
2012 Champion

Palmeiras
2nd title

== Top goalscorers ==
Rank	Name	Nationality	Club	Goals
1	Luís Fabiano	Brazil	São Paulo	8
2	Joffre Guerrón	Ecuador	Atlético Paranaense	7
