= 2013 SE Palmeiras season =

Palmeiras
2013 season
- President: Paulo Nobre
- Coach: Gilson Kleina
- Stadium: Pacaembu
- Série B: Champions
- Campeonato Paulista: Quarter-finals
- Copa Libertadores: Round of 16
- Copa do Brasil: Round of 16
- Top goalscorer: League: Alan Kardec – 14 goals All: Leandro – 19 goals
- Highest home attendance: 36,452 (vs. Tijuana – 14 May)
- Lowest home attendance: 3,709 (vs. Atlético Sorocaba – 7 February)
Home colors	Away colors	Third colors

The 2013 season was the 99th in Sociedade Esportiva Palmeiras's history. It was the second time in history that Palmeiras played in the second division of the Campeonato Brasileiro. Palmeiras competed in the Brasileiro Serie B, Campeonato Paulista, the Copa Libertadores and the Copa do Brasil.

== Key events ==
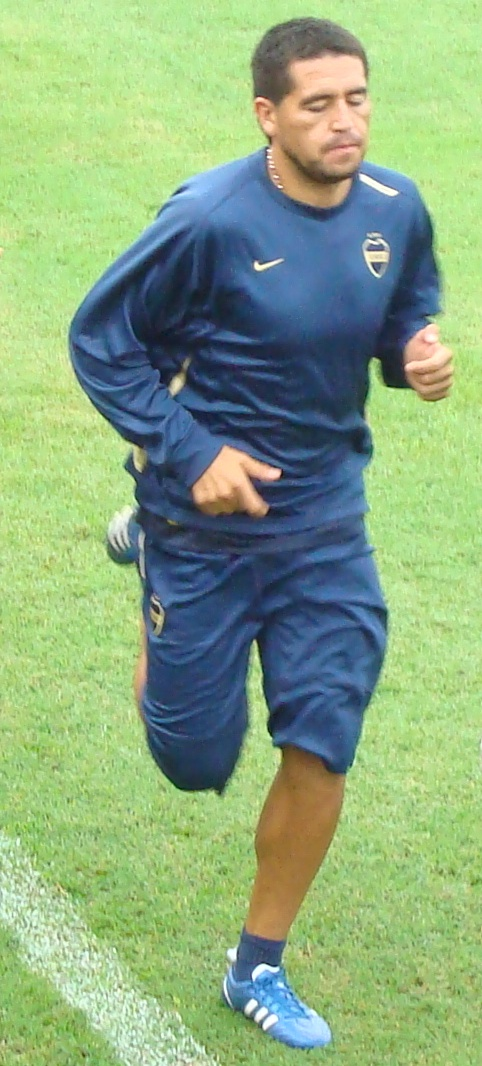
After great speculation, the Argentine Riquelme, did not come to Palmeiras.

- December 10, 2012: Palmeiras made its first trade signing the defender Ayrton from Coritiba.
- December 13, 2012: Fernando Prass from Vasco signed with Palmeiras.
- January 21, 2013: General elections for president and vice president. Paulo Nobre was elected, defeating Decio Perin by 153 votes against 106.
- January 24, 2013: After great speculation, the Argentine Riquelme did not come to Palmeiras. Paulo Nobre, the new president, said that Palmeiras would not have enough money for such a luxury.
- February 5, 2013: Two more players were announced for a loan until the end of the season, defender Marcelo Oliveira and midfielder Charles, the two coming from the team Cruzeiro. In exchange Palmeiras sent forward Luan.
- February 7, 2013: One more player was announced, the forward Kléber coming on loan from the Portuguese team Porto until the end of the year.
- February 8, 2013: Hernán Barcos signed with Grêmio. Palmeiras had a debt with the LDU (US$750,000) which Grêmio then assumed. In return Palmeiras received four players: Vilson, Rondinelly, Léo Gago and Leandro coming from a loan. Only Vilson was to stay indefinitely, the other three would return to Grêmio at the end of the season.
- February 22, 2013: Palmeiras announced the sponsorship contract with Kia Motors would end after the Campeonato Paulista.
- March 27, 2013: Palmeiras suffered a humiliating defeat, 6–2 against Mirassol. This caused some outrage among fans who went to the club headquarters to protest for better results.
- April 4, 2013: Leandro was called up by Felipão for the Brazil national football team to play a friendly game against Bolivia. Brazil won the game 3–1, with Leandro scoring the last goal.
- April 16, 2013: Both Leandro and Henrique were called up for the Brazil national football team to play a friendly game against Chile on April 24.
- April 18, 2013: Even though they lost their last match of the group stage, Palmeiras still qualified in first place moving to the round of 16 in the 2013 Copa Libertadores
- April 24, 2013: WTorre (responsible for construction of Allianz Parque) announced the sale of "naming rights" to Allianz, a German company already associated with other stadiums.
- June 6, 2013: Palmeiras reached a sponsorship agreement with Allianz for two games, the first against Sport Recife on June 8 and the second against América de Natal on June 11.
- June 7, 2013: Palmeiras signed its first international player of the year, the Paraguayan William Mendieta from Club Libertad.
- July 5, 2013: The midfielder Sebastián Eguren signed a contract until December 2014. Eguren defended the Uruguay national team in the 2013 FIFA Confederations Cup.
- August 21, 2013: The defender Henrique was called up by coach Felipão to compete in two friendly matches against Australia on September 7, and Portugal on September 10.
- October 26, 2013: After a 0–0 draw against São Caetano, Palmeiras secured its spot in the 2014 Série A.
- November 26, 2013: After some speculation coach Gilson Kleina renewed his contract for one more year.

== Competitions ==
=== Campeonato Paulista ===
The Campeonato Paulista is the major championship of São Paulo state, involving teams from all over the state. Palmeiras debuted in the competition on January 20 against Bragantino. The last time Palmeiras won the competition was in 2008. In 2013 Palmeiras finished placing sixth after being eliminated on penalties in the round of 16 against Santos.

==== Standings ====
Pos	Team	Pld	W	D	L	GF	GA	GD	Pts	Qualification or relegation
4	Ponte Preta	19	10	8	1	27	13	+14	38	Advanced to the Quarter-finals
5	Corinthians	19	9	8	2	31	16	+15	35	Advanced to the Quarter-finals
6	Palmeiras	19	9	7	3	34	24	+10	34	Advanced to the Quarter-finals
7	Botafogo-SP	19	9	4	6	26	23	+3	31	Advanced to the Quarter-finals
8	Penapolense	19	8	4	7	26	22	+4	28	Advanced to the Quarter-finals

Updated to match(es) played on unknown. Source:
Rules for classification: 1st points; 2nd games won; 3rd number of goals scored; 4th results between the teams; 5th less red cards; 6th less yellow cards; 7th raffle.

==== First round ====
Win Draw Loss

January 20 1	Palmeiras	0 – 0	Bragantino	São Paulo
17:00 (UTC−2)		Report	(yellow card) 55' Malaquias; (yellow card) 57' Rafael Defendi	Stadium: Pacaembu; Attendance: 10,617; Referee: Vinicius Furlan

January 23 2	Oeste	1 – 3	Palmeiras	São José do Rio Preto
19:30 (UTC−2)	Dezinho (yellow card) 8'; Eduardo Luiz (yellow card) 53'; Lelê (yellow card) 56'; Serginho 63'	Report	(yellow card) 20' Juninho; 26' Barcos; 32' Patrick Vieira; (yellow card) 84' Maurício Ramos; 89' Luan	Stadium: Teixeirão; Attendance: 11,166; Referee: Rodrigo Braghetto

January 27 3	Palmeiras	2 – 3	Penapolense	São Paulo
17:00 (UTC−2)	Ayrton 7', (yellow card) 43'; Márcio Araújo (yellow card) 72'; Henrique (yellow card) 76'; Wendel (yellow card) 80'; Luan 89'	Report	10' Guaru; 14' Magrão; (yellow card) 25' Fio; (yellow card) 49' Neto; (yellow card) 51' (yellow-red card) 53' Jaílton; 75' Perez	Stadium: Pacaembu; Attendance: 7,543; Referee: Fábio Volpato Mendes

January 31 4	Palmeiras	3 – 0	São Bernardo	São Paulo
19:30 (UTC−2)	Barcos 32', 55'; Valdivia 50', (yellow card) 69'	Report	(yellow card) 36' Gleidson	Stadium: Pacaembu; Attendance: 5,313; Referee: Adriano Assis Miranda

February 3 5	XV de Piracicaba	3 – 3	Palmeiras	Piracicaba
19:30 (UTC−2)	Márcio Diogo 2'; Diguinho 74'; Vinicius Bovi 81'	Report	38', 90+2' Henrique; (yellow card) 42' Valdivia; 52' Márcio Araújo; (yellow card) 80' Ayrton	Stadium: Barão da Serra Negra; Attendance: 8,496; Referee: Robério Pereira Pires

February 7 6	Palmeiras	2 – 0	Atlético Sorocaba	São Paulo
19:30 (UTC−2)	Márcio Araújo 6', (yellow card) 88'; Henrique 31'; Barcos (yellow card) 90+3'	Report	(yellow card) 61' Marcelo Moretto	Stadium: Pacaembu; Attendance: 3,709; Referee: Marcelo Prieto Alfieri

February 10 7	Mogi Mirim	2 – 2	Palmeiras	Mogi Mirim
19:30 (UTC−2)	Roni 31', 69'; Lucas Fonseca (yellow card) 33'; João Paulo (yellow card) 68'; Magal (yellow card) 84'	Report	(yellow card) 3' João Denoni; 11' Márcio Araújo; (yellow card) 23' Wesley; 77' Souza	Stadium: Romildo Ferreira; Attendance: 4,288; Referee: Rodrigo Braghetto

February 17 8	Corinthians	2 – 2	Palmeiras	São Paulo
16:00 (UTC−3)	Emerson 17', (yellow card) 69'; Jorge Henrique (yellow card) 67'; Romarinho 71', (yellow card) 71'	Report	(yellow card) 16' Maurício Ramos; 29' Vilson; 53' Vinícius	Stadium: Pacaembu; Attendance: 34,010; Referee: Antonio Rogério Batista Do Prado

February 24 9	Palmeiras	1 – 0	União Barbarense	São Paulo
16:00 (UTC−3)	Marcelo Oliveira (yellow card) 35' (yellow-red card) 67'; Leandro 81', (yellow card) 82'	Report	(yellow card) 22' Itaqui; (yellow card) 73' Bruno Pires; (yellow card) 81' Edilson Azul; (yellow card) 90+1' Juliano	Stadium: Pacaembu; Attendance: 19,128; Referee: Rodrigo Guarizo Ferreira Do Amaral

March 10 11	São Paulo	0 – 0	Palmeiras	São Paulo
16:00 (UTC−3)	Douglas (yellow card) 25'; Wellington (yellow card) 34'; Lúcio (red card) 49'; Luís Fabiano (yellow card) 56'; Jádson (yellow card) 79'	Report	(yellow card) 58' Patrick Vieira; (yellow card) 61' Kléber; (yellow card) 89' Weldinho	Stadium: Morumbi; Attendance: 18,020; Referee: Leandro Bizzio Marinho

March 14^{1} 10	Palmeiras	2 – 1	Paulista	São Paulo
20:30 (UTC−3)	Dráusio 2' (o.g.); Marcelo Oliveira (yellow card) 7'; Vilson 44'	Report	11' Marcelo Macedo; (yellow card) 36' (yellow-red card) 58' Matheus Galdezani; (red card) 45' Renato Ribeiro; (yellow card) 46' Dráusio	Stadium: Pacaembu; Attendance: 5,301; Referee: Luiz Flávio de Oliveira

March 17 12	São Caetano	1 – 1	Palmeiras	São Caetano do Sul
16:00 (UTC−3)	Bruno Aguiar (yellow card) 27'; Éder 40'	Report	48' Leandro; (yellow card) 90' Maurício Ramos	Stadium: Anacleto Campanella; Attendance: 2,360; Referee: Márcio Henrique de Gois

March 20 13	Palmeiras	2 – 0	Botafogo-SP	São Paulo
19:30 (UTC−3)	Leandro 5', 48'; Charles (yellow card) 23'; Léo Gago (yellow card) 65'; Weldinho (yellow card) 77'	Report	(yellow card) 50' Danilo Bueno; (yellow card) 76' Petro Costa; (yellow card) 79' André	Stadium: Pacaembu; Attendance: 4,160; Referee: Aurélio Santanna Martins

March 24 14	Palmeiras	0 – 0	Santos	São Paulo
16:00 (UTC−3)	André Luiz (yellow card) 53'	Report	(yellow card) 4' Renê Júnior	Stadium: Pacaembu; Attendance: 11,912; Referee: Marcelo Aparecido Ribeiro de Souza

March 27 15	Mirassol	6 – 2	Palmeiras	Mirassol
19:30 (UTC−3)	Marcos Vinícius 1' (o.g.); Caion 9', 11'; Leomir 39', (yellow card) 60'; Medina 43'; Camilo 45+1'; Pio (yellow card) 55'; Gustavo (yellow card) 57'	Report	22' Caio; (yellow card) 23' Léo Gago; 30' Ronny; (yellow card) 42' André Luiz; (yellow card) 62' Marcos Vinícius	Stadium: Campos Maia; Attendance: 4,159; Referee: Vinicius Gonçalves Dias Araujo

March 30 16	Palmeiras	2 – 1	Linense	São Paulo
18:30 (UTC−3)	Leandro (yellow card) 25', (goal) 55'; Léo Gago (yellow card) 62'; Marcelo Oliveira 90'	Report	(yellow card) 30', (goal) 60' Gilsinho; (yellow card) 42' Fernandinho	Stadium: Pacaembu; Attendance: 5,151; Referee: Márcio Henrique de Gois

April 7 17	Ponte Preta	1 – 2	Palmeiras	Campinas
16:00 (UTC−3)	Ramírez (yellow card) 18', (goal) 42'; Ferron (yellow card) 29'; Cléber (yellow card) 36' (yellow-red card) 88'; William (yellow card) 53'; Cicinho (yellow card) 64'	Report	3', (yellow card) 11' Tiago Real; (yellow card) 16' Charles; 72', (yellow card) 73' Leandro	Stadium: Moisés Lucarelli; Attendance: 9,098; Referee: Luiz Vanderlei Martinucho

April 14 18	Palmeiras	4 – 1	Guarani	São Paulo
16:00 (UTC−3)	Léo Gago 11'; João Denoni (yellow card) 25'; Vilson 29', (yellow card) 77'; Ayrton (yellow card) 52'; Charles (yellow card) 85', (goal) 87'; Ronny 90+1'	Report	(yellow card) 18' Wellington Monteiro; (yellow card) 58' Marquinhos; 72' Everton; (yellow card) 82' Montoya	Stadium: Pacaembu; Attendance: 7,911; Referee: Robério Pereira Pires

April 21 19	Ituano	2 – 1	Palmeiras	Itu
16:00 (UTC−3)	Leandro Silva (yellow card) 37'; Fernando Gabriel 68'; Marcão 90+3'	Report	(yellow card) 39' João Denoni; (yellow card) 67' Juninho; 69' Tiago Real; (yellow card) 82' Henrique; (yellow card) 84' Léo Gago	Stadium: Novelli Júnior; Attendance: 11,010; Referee: Flávio Rodrigues de Souza

Notes

- Note 1: Match postponed from the original date, March 3, due to scheduling conflicts.

==== Quarter-finals ====
April 27	Santos	1 – 1 (4 – 2 p)	Palmeiras	Santos
16:15 (UTC−3)	Cícero 11'; Renê Júnior (yellow card) 52'; Neto (yellow card) 76'	Report	(yellow card) 25' Henrique; 83' Kléber; (yellow card) 90+5' Wesley	Stadium: Vila Belmiro; Attendance: 14,172; Referee: Guilherme Ceretta de Lima
	Penalties
	Miralles (penalty scored); Cícero (penalty scored); Montillo (penalty scored); Renê Júnior (penalty scored)		(penalty missed) Kléber; (penalty scored) Souza; (penalty scored) Wesley; (penalty missed) Leandro
Note: Wesley received a yellow card in penalty shoot-out.

== Copa Libertadores ==
=== Group stage ===
==== Standings ====
Pos	Team	Pld	W	D	L	GF	GA	GD	Pts
1	(Brazil) Palmeiras (A)	6	3	0	3	5	5	0	9
2	(Argentina) Tigre (A)	6	3	0	3	9	10	−1	9
3	(Paraguay) Libertad	6	2	2	2	10	9	+1	8
4	(Peru) Sporting Cristal	6	2	2	2	8	8	0	8

Source: RSSSF
(A) Advanced to the round of 16

==== Matches ====
February 14 1	Palmeiras (Brazil)	2 – 1	(Peru) Sporting Cristal	São Paulo
22:00 (UTC−2)	Henrique 39'; Vinícius (yellow card) 46'; Wesley (yellow card) 63'; Patrick Vieira 68'	Report	(yellow card) 6' Cazulo; (yellow card) 48' Chiroque; 51' (pen.), (yellow card) 87' Lobatón; (yellow card) 56' Penny	Stadium: Pacaembu; Attendance: 18,433; Referee: Martín Vázquez (Uruguay)

February 28 2	Libertad (Paraguay)	2 – 0	(Brazil) Palmeiras	Asunción
19:15 (UTC−3)	Velázquez 10'; Benítez 54'	Report	(yellow card) 16' Maurício Ramos; (yellow card) 34' Valdivia; (yellow card) 55' Henrique; (yellow card) 56' Weldinho; (yellow card) 90+2' Vinícius	Stadium: Dr. Nicolás Léoz; Referee: Juan Soto (Venezuela)

March 6 3	Tigre (Argentina)	1 – 0	(Brazil) Palmeiras	Victoria
19:45 (UTC−3)	Leguizamón (yellow card) 63'; Galmarini (yellow card) 89'; Peñalba 90+4', (yellow card) 90+5'	Report	(yellow card) 6' Kléber; (yellow card) 63' (red card) 87' Vilson; (yellow card) 90' Patrick Vieira	Stadium: José Dellagiovanna; Referee: Omar Ponce (Ecuador)

April 2 4	Palmeiras (Brazil)	2 – 0	(Argentina) Tigre	São Paulo
21:30 (UTC−3)	Caio 18'; Charles 52'	Report	(yellow card) 34' Donatti; (yellow card) 56' Paparatto; (yellow card) 58' Orban; (yellow card) 82' Botta; (yellow card) 90+4' Ferreira	Stadium: Pacaembu; Attendance: 20,161; Referee: Patricio Polic (Chile)

April 11 5	Palmeiras (Brazil)	1 – 0	(Paraguay) Libertad	São Paulo
19:15 (UTC−3)	Souza (yellow card) 9'; Wesley (yellow card) 43' (yellow-red card) 61'; Charles 53'; Henrique (yellow card) 76'	Report	(yellow card) 5' Aquino; (yellow card) 39' Guiñazú; (yellow card) 43' Moreira	Stadium: Pacaembu; Attendance: 35,511; Referee: Daniel Fedorczuk (Uruguay)

April 18 6	Sporting Cristal (Peru)	1 – 0	(Brazil) Palmeiras	Callao
19:45 (UTC−3)	Cazulo (yellow card) 47'; Ávila 48'; Valverde (yellow card) 51'	Report	(yellow card) 67' Emerson; (yellow card) 71' Charles; (yellow card) 86' Maikon Leite	Stadium: Miguel Grau; Referee: Enrique Osses (Chile)

=== Knockout stages ===
==== Round of 16 ====
April 30 First leg	Tijuana (Mexico)	0 – 0	(Brazil) Palmeiras	Tijuana
22:30 (UTC−3)	Aguilar (yellow card) 18'; Pellerano (yellow card) 33'; Gandolfi (yellow card) 53'	Report	(yellow card) 34' Charles; (yellow card) 87' Marcelo Oliveira	Stadium: Caliente; Referee: Martín Vázquez (Uruguay)

May 14 Second leg	Palmeiras (Brazil)	1 – 2 (1–2 agg.)	(Mexico) Tijuana	São Paulo
22:00 (UTC−3)	Tiago Real (yellow card) 9'; Charles (yellow card) 20'; Kléber (yellow card) 42'; Souza 61' (pen.); Henrique (yellow card) 90+3'	Report	(yellow card) 21' Castillo; (yellow card) 22' (red card) 83' Aguilar; 26', (yellow card) 45+4' Riascos; (yellow card) 31' Ruiz; (yellow card) 45+1' Núñez; (yellow card) 47', (goal) 51' Arce	Stadium: Pacaembu; Attendance: 36,452; Referee: Juan Soto (Venezuela)

== Campeonato Brasileiro Série B ==
=== Standings ===
Pos	Team	Pld	W	D	L	GF	GA	GD	Pts	Promotion or relegation
1	Palmeiras (C, P)	38	24	7	7	71	28	+43	79	Promotion to 2014 Série A
2	Chapecoense (P)	38	20	12	6	60	31	+29	72	Promotion to 2014 Série A
3	Sport (P)	38	20	3	15	64	56	+8	63	Promotion to 2014 Série A
4	Figueirense (P)	38	18	6	14	63	52	+11	60	Promotion to 2014 Série A
5	Icasa	38	18	5	15	50	54	−4	59	

Updated to match(es) played on unknown. Source: Soccerway.com
Rules for classification: 1st points; 2nd wins; 3rd goal difference; 4th goals scored; 5th head-to-head results; 6th least red cards received; 7th least yellow cards received; 8th draw.
(C) Champions; (P) Promoted

=== Matches ===
Schedule released on March 25, 2013. The games had a break during the 2013 FIFA Confederations Cup, which was held between June and July in Brazil. Six rounds were played before the stoppage.

May 25 1	Palmeiras	1 – 0	Atlético Goianiense	Itu^{1}
16:20 (UTC−3)	Henrique (yellow card) 34'; Tiago Real 51'; Ronny (yellow card) 85'	Report	(yellow card) 23' João Paulo; (yellow card) 29' Ernandes	Stadium: Novelli Júnior; Attendance: 4,480; Referee: Felipe Gomes da Silva (Rio de Janeiro)

May 28 2	ASA	0 – 3	Palmeiras	Arapiraca
21:50 (UTC−3)	Lúcio Maranhão (yellow card) 51'; Fabiano (yellow card) 80'	Report	7' Kléber; 21' Juninho; 42' Tiago Real; (yellow card) 79' Leandro	Stadium: Fumeirão; Attendance: 9,402; Referee: Cláudio Francisco Lima e Silva (Sergipe)

June 1 3	Palmeiras	0 – 1	América Mineiro	Itu^{1}
16:20 (UTC−3)	Leandro (yellow card) 88'	Report	37', (yellow card) 84' Nikão; (yellow card) 54' Danilo; (yellow card) 58' Willians; (yellow card) 90+1' Matheus	Stadium: Novelli Júnior; Attendance: 7,747; Referee: Pablo dos Santos Alves (Espírito Santo)

June 4 4	Palmeiras	2 – 1	Avaí	Itu^{1}
19:30 (UTC−3)	Leandro 3'; Charles (yellow card) 50'; Ronny 74', (yellow card) 75'; Caio (yellow card) 76'	Report	20' Márcio Diogo; (yellow card) 40' Julinho; (yellow card) 59' Cléber Santana; (yellow card) 84' Leandro Silva	Stadium: Novelli Júnior; Attendance: 5,792; Referee: Wagner do Nascimento Magalhães (Rio de Janeiro)

June 8 5	Sport Recife	1 – 0	Palmeiras	Recife
16:20 (UTC−3)	Marcelo Cordeiro (yellow card) 38'; Rithely (yellow card) 72'; Nunes (yellow card) 85', (goal) 90+3'	Report	(yellow card) 35' Leandro; (yellow card) 70' Ayrton; (yellow card) 90+4' Henrique; (red card) 45+' Márcio Araújo	Stadium: Ilha do Retiro; Attendance: 21,726; Referee: Wagner Reway (Mato Grosso)
Note: Márcio Araújo received a red card after the end of the game per claim after the goal.

June 11 6	América de Natal	0 – 2	Palmeiras	Ceará-Mirim
21:50 (UTC−3)	Márcio Passos (yellow card) 17'; Cascata (yellow card) 79'	Report	27' Vinícius; (yellow card) 45' Tiago Real; (yellow card) 62' Maurício Ramos; (yellow card) 71' Ayrton; 90+2' Fernandinho	Stadium: Barretão; Attendance: 4,632; Referee: Ricardo Marques Ribeiro (Minas Gerais)

July 6 7	Palmeiras	4 – 0	Oeste	Presidente Prudente^{1}
16:20 (UTC−3)	Leandro 6', 37'; Charles 66', 82'; Mendieta (yellow card) 84'	Report	(yellow card) 20' Piauí; (yellow card) 43' Everton Dias	Stadium: Prudentão; Attendance: 7,542; Referee: Antonio Rogério Batista do Prado (São Paulo)

July 12 8	Palmeiras	4 – 1	ABC	São Paulo
21:00 (UTC−3)	Wesley 19'; Luis Felipe 23'; Henrique (yellow card) 38'; Vinícius 62' (pen.); Serginho 75'	Report	(yellow card) 33' Bileu; (yellow card) 51' Flávio Boaventura; 90+1' Gilcimar	Stadium: Pacaembu; Attendance: 22,488; Referee: Antonio Denival de Morais (Paraná)

July 20 9	Figueirense	2 – 3	Palmeiras	Florianópolis
16:20 (UTC−3)	Ricardinho (yellow card) 26'; Rafael Costa 31'; André Rocha (yellow card) 37' (yellow-red card) 71'; Nem (yellow card) 49'; Ricardo Bueno 76'	Report	56' Vinícius; (yellow card) 68' Alan Kardec; 72' André Luiz; (yellow card) 74', (goal) 87' Valdivia; (yellow card) 81' Ananias	Stadium: Orlando Scarpelli; Attendance: 9,989; Referee: Marcos Gomes da Penha (Espírito Santo)

July 27 10	Guaratinguetá	1 – 1	Palmeiras	Guaratinguetá
16:20 (UTC−3)	Murilo (yellow card) 3'; Ruan (yellow card) 43' (yellow-red card) 63'; Júlio César (yellow card) 44'; Douglas Tanque 47'; Giovanni (yellow card) 83'	Report	(yellow card) 10' Charles; 19' Leandro; (yellow card) 44' Valdivia; (yellow card) 69' André Luiz; (yellow card) 84' Luis Felipe; (yellow card) 88' (red card) 90+1' Ronny	Stadium: Dario Rodrigues Leite; Attendance: 10,315; Referee: Vinicius Furlan (São Paulo)

July 30 11	Palmeiras	4 – 0	Icasa	São Paulo
21:50 (UTC−3)	Henrique (yellow card) 23'; Vinícius 37' (pen.); Alan Kardec (yellow card) 70', (goal) 77', 90+1'; Wesley 84'	Report	(yellow card) 29' Luiz Otávio; (yellow card) 45' Chapinha; (yellow card) 46' Radamés	Stadium: Pacaembu; Attendance: 12,890; Referee: Eduardo Tomaz de Aquino Valadão (Goiás)

August 2 12	Palmeiras	2 – 1	Bragantino	São Paulo
19:30 (UTC−3)	Luis Felipe (yellow card) 22'; Alan Kardec 41'; Valdivia 62'; Charles (red card) 73'; Fernando Prass (yellow card) 85'	Report	(yellow card) 12' Diego Macedo; (yellow card) 29' (red card) 69' Elias; (yellow card) 32' Léo Jaime; (yellow card) 75' Geandro; 88' Kadu	Stadium: Pacaembu; Attendance: 20,604; Referee: Guilherme Ceretta de Lima (São Paulo)

August 6 13	São Caetano	1 – 2	Palmeiras	São Caetano do Sul
19:30 (UTC−3)	Geovane 23'; Pirão (yellow card) 56'	Report	55' Alan Kardec; 59' Henrique	Stadium: Anacleto Campanella; Attendance: 3,960; Referee: Flávio Rodrigues Guerra (São Paulo)

August 10 14	Palmeiras	2 – 1	Paraná	São Paulo
16:20 (UTC−3)	Leandro (yellow card) 38'; Juninho 59'; Alan Kardec (yellow card) 66'; Wesley 71'; Valdivia (yellow card) 77'; Mendieta (yellow card) 81'; Eguren (yellow card) 88'	Report	17' (o.g.) Charles; (yellow card) 25' Paulinho; (yellow card) 37' Reinaldo; (yellow card) 50' Ricardo Conceição; (yellow card) 80' Alex Alves	Stadium: Pacaembu; Attendance: 31,823; Referee: Antonio Frederico de Carvalho Schneider (Rio de Janeiro)

August 13 15	Joinville	0 – 1	Palmeiras	Joinville
21:50 (UTC−3)	Lima (yellow card) 53'	Report	5' Mendieta; (yellow card) 15' Ananias	Stadium: Arena Joinville; Attendance: 16,680; Referee: Fabrício Neves Corrêa (Rio Grande do Sul)

August 17 16	Palmeiras	3 – 2	Paysandu	São Paulo
16:20 (UTC−3)	Leandro (yellow card) 36', (goal) 90+4'; Alan Kardec 73'; Wesley (red card) 79'; Mendieta 84'	Report	14', (yellow card) 26' Pablo; (yellow card) 36' Djalma; 65' Yago Pikachu; (yellow card) 67' Marcelo; (yellow card) 77' Vanderson; (red card) 79' Fábio Sanches	Stadium: Pacaembu; Attendance: 18,850; Referee: Gilberto Rodrigues Castro Junior (Pernambuco)

August 24 17	Boa Esporte	1 – 0	Palmeiras	Varginha
16:20 (UTC−3)	Fernando Karanga 2'; Petros (yellow card) 22'; Marcelinho Paraíba (yellow card) 76'	Report	(yellow card) 30' Eguren; (yellow card) 58' Charles	Stadium: Melão; Attendance: 9,789; Referee: Grazianni Maciel Rocha (Rio de Janeiro)
Note: Henrique the team captain in this match used the jersey number 99, celebrating 99 years of Palmeiras.

August 31 18	Ceará	2 – 2	Palmeiras	Fortaleza
21:00 (UTC−3)	Magno Alves 24'; João Marcos (yellow card) 48'; Marcos 65'; Rogerinho (yellow card) 76'	Report	(yellow card) 5', (goal) 70' Leandro; 43' Alan Kardec; (yellow card) 53' Valdivia; (yellow card) 63' Wesley	Stadium: Castelão; Attendance: 48,960; Referee: Alício Pena Júnior (Minas Gerais)

September 3 19	Palmeiras	0 – 0	Chapecoense	São Paulo
21:50 (UTC−3)	Alan Kardec (yellow card) 68'	Report	(yellow card) 38' Tiago Luís; (yellow card) 50' Danilinho; (yellow card) 89' Rafael Lima	Stadium: Pacaembu; Attendance: 9,424; Referee: Arilson Bispo da Anunciação (Bahia)

September 7 20	Atlético Goianiense	1 – 3	Palmeiras	Itumbiara
18:15 (UTC−3)	Artur (yellow card) 72'; Ricardo Jesus 83'	Report	12', 15' (pen.) Alan Kardec; (yellow card) 76' Tiago Alves; 78' Leandro	Stadium: Estádio JK; Attendance: 22,691; Referee: Jean Pierre Gonçalves Lima (Rio Grande do Sul)

September 10 21	Palmeiras	3 – 0	ASA	São Paulo
19:30 (UTC−3)	Leandro (yellow card) 8'; Alan Kardec 36'; Wesley 49'; Serginho 79'	Report	(yellow card) 8' Glaybson; (yellow card) 33' Gilson; (yellow card) 43' Tiago Garça; (yellow card) 86' Reinaldo	Stadium: Pacaembu; Attendance: 9,765; Referee: Wagner dos Santos Rosa (Rio de Janeiro)

September 14 22	América Mineiro	1 – 1	Palmeiras	Belo Horizonte
16:20 (UTC−3)	Leandro 21'; Jaílton (yellow card) 81'; Matheus (red card) 88'	Report	12', (yellow card) 59' Leandro; (red card) 88' Alan Kardec; (yellow card) 90+3' Vilson	Stadium: Independência; Attendance: 6,431; Referee: Cláudio Mercante Júnior (Pernambuco)

September 17 23	Avaí	2 – 4	Palmeiras	Florianópolis
21:50 (UTC−3)	Márcio Diogo 14'; Anderson Uchoa (yellow card) 28'; Eduardo Costa (yellow card) 33'; Luciano 66'; Héracles (yellow card) 75'; Marquinhos (yellow card) 80'	Report	(yellow card) 2' Wendel; (yellow card) 23', (goal) 37' Valdivia; (yellow card) 25', (goal) 69' Mendieta; (yellow card) 35' Henrique; 81' Vinícius; 88' Eguren	Stadium: Ressacada; Attendance: 7,852; Referee: Felipe Gomes da Silva (Paraná)

September 21 24	Palmeiras	2 – 1	Sport Recife	São Paulo
16:20 (UTC−3)	Wesley 1', 53', (yellow card) 66'	Report	(yellow card) 39', (goal) 80' Rithely; (yellow card) 51' Pereira; (yellow card) 60' (yellow-red card) 65' Tobi; (yellow card) 84' Felipe Azevedo	Stadium: Pacaembu; Attendance: 21,054; Referee: Célio Amorim (Santa Catarina)

September 28 25	Palmeiras	0 – 0	América de Natal	São Paulo
16:20 (UTC−3)	Vilson (yellow card) 53'; Alan Kardec (yellow card) 90+1'	Report	(yellow card) 31' Adriano Pardal; (yellow card) 40' Andrey; (yellow card) 52' Edson Rocha; (yellow card) 69' Tiago Adan	Stadium: Pacaembu; Attendance: 19,642; Referee: Emerson de Almeida Ferreira (Minas Gerais)

October 1 26	Oeste	0 – 2	Palmeiras	São José do Rio Preto
21:50 (UTC−3)	Everton Dias (yellow card) 1'; Jheimy (yellow card) 19'; Piauí (yellow card) 21'; Fernando Leal (red card) 68'; Adriano (yellow card) 73'	Report	15', (yellow card) 65' (yellow-red card) 68' Leandro; (yellow card) 52' Valdivia; (yellow card) 74' Charles; 90+2' Serginho; (yellow card) 90+3' Henrique	Stadium: Teixeirão; Attendance: 19,133; Referee: Marcelo Aparecido Ribeiro de Souza (São Paulo)

October 5 27	ABC	3 – 2	Palmeiras	Natal
16:20 (UTC−3)	Gilmar 8', (yellow card) 53'; Flávio Boaventura (yellow card) 21'; Edson (yellow card) 28'; Rodrigo Silva 39' (pen.); Lino 71'	Report	24' Alan Kardec; (yellow card) 28', (goal) 31' Vilson; (yellow card) 39' Marcelo Oliveira	Stadium: Frasqueirão; Attendance: 15,636; Referee: Marcos Gomes da Penha (Espírito Santo)

October 8 28	Palmeiras	4 – 0	Figueirense	Londrina^{2}
19:30 (UTC−3)	Alan Kardec 5' (pen.), 52'; Charles (yellow card) 45+1'; Mendieta 48' (pen.); Wesley (yellow card) 50'; Serginho 83'	Report	(yellow card) 33' William; (yellow card) 37' Rodrigo; (yellow card) 47' Douglas Marques; (yellow card) 90+1' Nem	Stadium: Estádio do Café; Attendance: 16,454; Referee: Edivaldo Elias da Silva (Paraná)

October 11 29	Palmeiras	1 – 0	Guaratinguetá	Londrina^{2}
21:50 (UTC−3)	Mendieta (yellow card) 14'; Vilson 45'; Charles (yellow card) 84'	Report	(yellow card) 1' Júlio César; (yellow card) 35' Bruno Formigoni; (yellow card) 41' Wendel; (yellow card) 83' Pedro Paulo	Stadium: Estádio do Café; Attendance: 17,120; Referee: Antonio Rogério Batista do Prado (São Paulo)

October 15 30	Icasa	1 – 0	Palmeiras	Juazeiro do Norte
21:50 (UTC−3)	Luiz Otávio (yellow card) 29'; Juninho Potiguar 30'; Gilmak (yellow card) 39'; Guto (yellow card) 50'; Chapinha (yellow card) 68'; Luis Gustavo (yellow card) 90+4'	Report	(yellow card) 52' Luís Felipe; (red card) 90+1' Juninho	Stadium: Romeirão; Attendance: 10,490; Referee: Pablo dos Santos Alves (Espírito Santo)

October 19 31	Bragantino	0 – 2	Palmeiras	Bragança Paulista
16:20 (UTC−3)	Robertinho (yellow card) 50'; Geandro (yellow card) 63'; Leandro Santos (yellow card) 66'; Guilherme Mattis (yellow card) 68'; Preto (yellow card) 80'	Report	27' Alan Kardec; (yellow card) 36' (yellow-red card) 51' Leandro; 90+2' Wesley	Stadium: Nabi Abi Chedid; Attendance: 6,205; Referee: André Luiz de Freitas Castro (Goiás)

October 26 32	Palmeiras	0 – 0	São Caetano	São Paulo
16:20 (UTC−2)	Luis Felipe (yellow card) 80'	Report	(yellow card) 45+1' Bruno Aguiar; (yellow card) 56' Anselmo; (yellow card) 58' Samuel Xavier	Stadium: Pacaembu; Attendance: 33,478; Referee: Wilson Seneme (São Paulo)

November 2 33	Paraná	1 – 1	Palmeiras	Curitiba
16:20 (UTC−2)	Ricardo Conceição (yellow card) 25'; Henrique Avila (yellow card) 54'; Edson Sitta 83'	Report	(yellow card) 19' Eguren; (yellow card) 46' Henrique; (yellow card) 55' Alan Kardec; (yellow card) 64' Marcelo Oliveira; 88' Leandro	Stadium: Vila Capanema; Attendance: 13,173; Referee: Francisco Carlos Nascimento (Alagoas)

November 9 34	Palmeiras	3 – 0	Joinville	São Paulo
16:20 (UTC−2)	Leandro 22', (yellow card) 45' (yellow-red card) 54'; Juninho 69'; Serginho 87', (yellow card) 88'	Report	(yellow card) 13' Eduardo; (yellow card) 73' Clebinho; (yellow card) 90' Sandro	Stadium: Pacaembu; Attendance: 12,741; Referee: Rodrigo Nunes de Sá (Rio de Janeiro)

November 12 35	Paysandu	1 – 0	Palmeiras	Belém
21:50 (UTC−2)	Yago Pikachu 58'; Vanderson (yellow card) 75'	Report	(yellow card) 28' André Luiz; (yellow card) 90+2' (red card) 90+2' Henrique	Stadium: Mangueirão; Attendance: 33,248; Referee: Anderson Daronco (Rio Grande do Sul)

November 16 36	Palmeiras	3 – 0	Boa Esporte	São Paulo
16:20 (UTC−2)	Wendel (yellow card) 24'; Felipe Menezes 28'; Leandro 56'; Alan Kardec (yellow card) 56'; Juninho 76'; Charles (yellow card) 82'	Report	(yellow card) 18' Marcelinho Paraíba; (yellow card) 18' Betinho; (yellow card) 22' Vinícius Hess; (yellow card) 59' Ciro Sena; (yellow card) 81' Moisés	Stadium: Pacaembu; Attendance: 19,216; Referee: Edivaldo Elias da Silva (Paraná)

November 23 37	Palmeiras	4 – 1	Ceará	Campo Grande
17:20 (UTC−2)	Eguren 30'; Charles 59'; Alan Kardec 63'; Leandro 79'	Report	19' Magno Alves; (yellow card) 24' Thiago Humberto; (yellow card) 26' Ricardinho; (yellow card) 60' Vicente	Stadium: Morenão; Attendance: 7,121; Referee: Márcio Chagas da Silva (Rio Grande do Sul)

November 30 38	Chapecoense	1 – 0	Palmeiras	Chapecó
16:20 (UTC−2)	Athos (yellow card) 25'; Bruno Rangel 44' (pen.); Glaydson (yellow card) 57'; Fabinho Gaúcho (yellow card) 65'; Wanderson (yellow card) 83'; Nenén (yellow card) 87'	Report	(yellow card) 28' Wendel; (yellow card) 43' Juninho	Stadium: Arena Condá; Attendance: 9,251; Referee: Wagner do Nascimento Magalhães (Rio de Janeiro)

Notes

- Note 1: Palmeiras was punished with the loss of four home field matches because of incidents involving their fans in the match against Botafogo in Araraquara last year.
- Note 2: Palmeiras was again punished by Superior Tribunal de Justiça Desportiva because of fights in the Dario Rodrigues Leite stadium in Guaratinguetá during the 10th round of the competition.

== Copa do Brasil ==
The table for the competition was released on February 4, 2013. Palmeiras was the title holder. The team entered in the Round of 16. The draw for the round of 16 was held on August 6, 2013.

=== Round of 16 ===
August 21 1st leg	Palmeiras (São Paulo (state))	1 – 0	(Paraná (state)) Atlético Paranaense	São Paulo
19:30 (UTC−3)	Vilson 3'; Mendieta (yellow card) 55'; Eguren (yellow card) 84'; Alan Kardec (yellow card) 85'	Report	(yellow card) 45' Zezinho; (yellow card) 57' Jonas; (yellow card) 86' Éverton	Stadium: Pacaembu; Attendance: 21,935; Referee: André Luiz de Freitas Castro (Goiás)

August 28 2nd leg	Atlético Paranaense (Paraná (state))	3 – 0 (3–1 agg.)	(São Paulo (state)) Palmeiras	Curitiba
21:50 (UTC−3)	Éderson 33', 77'; Léo (yellow card) 50'; Paulo Baier 66'; Zezinho (yellow card) 90+2'	Report	(yellow card) 67' Henrique; (yellow card) 85' Fernandinho	Stadium: Vila Capanema; Attendance: 10,789; Referee: Ricardo Marques Ribeiro (Minas Gerais)

== Players ==
=== Squad information ===
As of November 30, 2013

Note: Flags indicate national team as defined under FIFA eligibility rules; some limited exceptions apply. Players may hold more than one non-FIFA nationality.

No.	Pos.	Nation	Player
1	GK	BRA	Bruno
3	DF	BRA	Henrique
5	MF	URU	Sebastián Eguren
6	DF	BRA	Juninho
8	FW	PAR	William Mendieta
10	MF	CHI	Jorge Valdivia
11	MF	BRA	Wesley
13	MF	BRA	Wendel
14	FW	BRA	Alan Kardec (on loan from Benfica)
15	DF	BRA	Vilson
16	DF	BRA	Fernandinho
17	MF	BRA	Ronny
18	MF	BRA	Márcio Araújo
19	FW	BRA	Vinícius
20	MF	BRA	Serginho (on loan from Oeste)
25	GK	BRA	Fernando Prass
26	DF	BRA	Marcelo Oliveira (on loan from Cruzeiro)

No.	Pos.	Nation	Player
27	MF	BRA	Ananias (on loan from Cruzeiro)
28	MF	BRA	Charles (on loan from Cruzeiro)
29	FW	BRA	Caio
30	MF	BRA	Bruno Dybal
31	DF	BRA	Léo Gago (on loan from Grêmio)
33	DF	BRA	André Luiz
36	DF	BRA	Tiago Alves
37	FW	BRA	Rondinelly
38	FW	BRA	Leandro (on loan from Grêmio)
40	MF	BRA	Felipe Menezes (on loan from Benfica)
41	DF	BRA	Thiago Martins
42	DF	BRA	Luis Felipe
44	DF	BRA	Bruno Oliveira
47	GK	BRA	Fábio
49	MF	BRA	Edilson
50	MF	BRA	Renatinho
–	DF	BRA	Victor Luis

=== Libertadores squad ===
Palmeiras sent the list of 30 players to CONMEBOL to play the Libertadores.

Note: Flags indicate national team as defined under FIFA eligibility rules; some limited exceptions apply. Players may hold more than one non-FIFA nationality.

No.	Pos.	Nation	Player
1	GK	BRA	Bruno
2	DF	BRA	Ayrton
3	DF	BRA	Henrique
4	DF	BRA	Maurício Ramos
5	MF	BRA	João Denoni
6	DF	BRA	Juninho
7	FW	BRA	Maikon Leite
8	MF	BRA	Souza
9	FW	BRA	Kléber
10	MF	CHI	Jorge Valdivia
11	MF	BRA	Wesley
12	DF	BRA	André Luiz
13	MF	BRA	Wendel
14	DF	BRA	Luiz Gustavo
15	DF	BRA	Vilson

No.	Pos.	Nation	Player
16	DF	BRA	Leandro Amaro
17	MF	BRA	Ronny
18	MF	BRA	Márcio Araújo
19	FW	BRA	Vinícius
20	MF	BRA	Serginho
21	MF	BRA	Patrick Vieira
22	DF	BRA	Weldinho
23	MF	BRA	Tiago Real
24	GK	BRA	Raphael Alemão
25	GK	BRA	Fernando Prass
26	DF	BRA	Marcelo Oliveira
27	FW	BRA	Emerson
28	MF	BRA	Charles
29	FW	BRA	Caio
30	MF	BRA	Bruno Dybal

Note: For the knockout stages Palmeiras made two changes in the Libertadores squad: André Luiz replaced Marcos Vinícus and Serginho replaced Edilson.

=== Transfers ===
==== In ====
P	Nat.	Name	Age	Moving from	Type	Source
DF	(Brazil)	Ayrton	27	(Brazil) Coritiba	Signed	
GK	(Brazil)	Fernando Prass	34	(Brazil) Vasco	Signed	
MF	(Brazil)	Souza	24	(Brazil) Náutico	Loan return	
MF	(Brazil)	Wendel	31	(Brazil) Ponte Preta	Loan return	
MF	(Brazil)	Marcelo Oliveira	25	(Brazil) Cruzeiro	Loan	
DF	(Brazil)	Charles	27	(Brazil) Cruzeiro	Loan	
MF	(Brazil)	Ronny	21	(Brazil) Figueirense	Sign	
FW	(Brazil)	Kléber	22	(Portugal) Porto	Loan	
DF	(Brazil)	Vilson	24	(Brazil) Grêmio	Sign	
FW	(Brazil)	Rondinelly	22	(Brazil) Grêmio	Sign	
DF	(Brazil)	Léo Gago	29	(Brazil) Grêmio	Loan	
FW	(Brazil)	Leandro	19	(Brazil) Grêmio	Loan	
DF	(Brazil)	Weldinho	22	(Brazil) Corinthians	Sign	
DF	(Brazil)	André Luiz	33	(France) Nancy	Sign	
MF	(Brazil)	Serginho	22	(Brazil) Oeste	Loan	
DF	(Brazil)	Tiago Alves	28	(Brazil) Mogi Mirim	Sign	
MF	(Brazil)	Ananias	24	(Brazil) Cruzeiro	Loan	
FW	(Paraguay)	Mendieta	24	(Paraguay) Libertad	Sign	
FW	(Brazil)	Alan Kardec	24	(Portugal) Benfica	Loan	
DF	(Brazil)	Thiago Martins	18	(Brazil) Mogi Mirim	Sign	
MF	(Brazil)	Felipe Menezes	25	(Portugal) Benfica	Sign	
MF	(Uruguay)	Sebastián Eguren	32	(Paraguay) Libertad	Sign	

==== Out ====
P	Nat.	Name	Age	Moving to	Type	Source
DF	(Brazil)	Leandro	33	(Brazil) Cabofriense	Out of contract	
MF	(Brazil)	João Vitor	24	None	Out of contract	
MF	(Brazil)	Daniel Carvalho	29	None	Out of contract	
FW	(Brazil)	Betinho	25	None	Out of contract	
FW	(Brazil)	Obina	29	(China) Shandong Luneng	Loan return	
DF	(Paraguay)	Adalberto Román	25	(Ecuador) LDU de Quito	Out of contract	
DF	(Brazil)	Thiago Heleno	24	None	Out of contract	
DF	(Brazil)	Artur	28	(Brazil) São Caetano	Loan return	
MF	(Brazil)	Corrêa	31	(Brazil) Portuguesa	Out of contract	
DF	(Brazil)	Luis Felipe	19	(Brazil) Penapolense	Loan	
FW	(Brazil)	Daniel Lovinho	23	(Brazil) Linense	Loan	
GK	(Brazil)	Carlos	22	None	Undefined	
GK	(Brazil)	Pegorari	21	None	Undefined	
DF	(Brazil)	Leandro Amaro	26	(Brazil) Avaí	Loan	
DF	(Brazil)	Wellington	21	None	Undefined	
DF	(Brazil)	Fabinho Capixaba	29	None	Undefined	
DF	(Brazil)	Gerley	22	(Brazil) Ceará	Loan	
MF	(Brazil)	Tinga	22	(Brazil) Figueirense	Loan	
MF	(Brazil)	Patrik	22	(South Korea) Gangwon FC	Loan	
FW	(Brazil)	Tadeu	26	None	Undefined	
MF	(Brazil)	Marcos Assunção	36	(Brazil) Santos	Out of contract	
FW	(Brazil)	Mazinho	25	(Japan) Vissel Kobe	Loan	
FW	(Brazil)	Luan	24	(Brazil) Cruzeiro	Loan	
FW	(Argentina)	Hernán Barcos	28	(Brazil) Grêmio	Sign	
MF	(Brazil)	Souza	25	(Brazil) Cruzeiro	Sign	
DF	(Brazil)	Maurício Ramos	28	(United Arab Emirates) Al Sharjah	Loan	
FW	(Brazil)	Chico	20	(Brazil) Santo André	Loan	
MF	(Brazil)	Patrik	22	(Brazil) Sport	Loan	
MF	(Brazil)	João Denoni	19	(Brazil) Oeste	Loan	
FW	(Brazil)	Emerson	22	(Brazil) Oeste	Loan	
DF	(Brazil)	Leandro Amaro	27	(Brazil) Náutico	Loan	
FW	(Brazil)	Maikon Leite	24	(Brazil) Náutico	Loan	
MF	(Brazil)	Tiago Real	24	(Brazil) Náutico	Loan	
DF	(Brazil)	Weldinho	22	(Portugal) Sporting	Loan	
MF	(Brazil)	Diego Souza	20	(Brazil) Oeste	Loan	
MF	(Brazil)	Patrick Vieira	21	(Japan) Yokohama FC	Loan	
DF	(Brazil)	Ayrton	28	(Brazil) Vitória	Loan	
DF	(Brazil)	Luiz Gustavo	19	(Brazil) Vitória	Loan	
DF	(Brazil)	Marcos Vinícius	22	(Brazil) Rio Claro	Loan	

== Statistics ==
=== Overall statistics ===
As of 30 November 2013

Games played	68 (38 Campeonato Brasileiro Série B, 20 Campeonato Paulista, 2 Copa do Brasil, 8 Copa Libertadores)
Games won	37 (24 Campeonato Brasileiro, 9 Campeonato Paulista, 1 Copa do Brasil, 3 Copa Libertadores)
Games drawn	15 (7 Campeonato Brasileiro, 8 Campeonato Paulista, 0 Copa do Brasil, 1 Copa Libertadores)
Games lost	13 (7 Campeonato Brasileiro, 3 Campeonato Paulista, 1 Copa do Brasil, 4 Copa Libertadores)
Goals scored	113
Goals conceded	63
Goal difference	+50 (+43 Campeonato Brasileiro, +11 Campeonato Paulista, –2 Copa do Brasil, –1 Copa Libertadores)
Clean sheets	27
Best result	4–0 (vs. Oeste – July 6, Campeonato Brasileiro Série B); 4–0 (vs. Figueirense – October 8, Campeonato Brasileiro Série B)
Worst result	2–6 (vs. Mirassol – March 27, Campeonato Paulista)
Yellow cards	146
Red cards	13
Top scorer	Leandro (19 goals)
Most clean sheets	Fernando Prass (23)
Worst discipline	Henrique (15 (yellow card) , 1 (red card) )

=== Goalscorers ===
In italic players who left the team in mid-season.

Place	Position	Nationality	Number	Name	Campeonato Paulista	Copa Libertadores	Série B	Copa do Brasil	Total
1	FW	(Brazil)	38	Leandro	6	0	13	0	19
2	FW	(Brazil)	14	Alan Kardec	0	0	14	0	14
3	MF	(Brazil)	11	Wesley	0	0	7	0	7
4	FW	(Brazil)	19	Vinícius	1	0	5	0	6
4	DF	(Brazil)	15	Vilson	3	0	2	1	6
4	MF	(Brazil)	28	Charles	1	2	3	0	6
5	DF	(Brazil)	3	Henrique	3	1	1	0	5
5	MF	(Brazil)	20	Serginho	0	0	5	0	5
6	MF	(Brazil)	23	Tiago Real	2	0	2	0	4
6	MF	(Chile)	10	Valdivia	1	0	3	0	4
6	FW	(Paraguay)	8	Mendieta	0	0	4	0	4
6	DF	(Brazil)	6	Juninho	0	0	4	0	4
7	FW	(Argentina)	9	Hernán Barcos	3	0	0	0	3
7	MF	(Brazil)	18	Márcio Araújo	3	0	0	0	3
7	MF	(Brazil)	17	Ronny	2	0	1	0	3
8	FW	(Brazil)	11	Luan	2	0	0	0	2
8	MF	(Brazil)	21	Patrick Vieira	1	1	0	0	2
8	FW	(Brazil)	29	Caio	1	1	0	0	2
8	MF	(Brazil)	8	Souza	1	1	0	0	2
8	FW	(Brazil)	9	Kléber	1	0	1	0	2
8	MF	(Uruguay)	5	Eguren	0	0	2	0	2
8	DF	(Brazil)	33	André Luiz	0	0	2	0	2
9	DF	(Brazil)	2	Ayrton	1	0	0	0	1
9	DF	(Brazil)	26	Marcelo Oliveira	1	0	0	0	1
9	DF	(Brazil)	31	Léo Gago	1	0	0	0	1
9	DF	(Brazil)	16	Fernandinho	0	0	1	0	1
9	DF	(Brazil)	42	Luis Felipe	0	0	1	0	1
9	MF	(Brazil)	40	Felipe Menezes	0	0	1	0	1

=== Disciplinary record ===
Number	Nationality	Position	Name	Campeonato Paulista		Copa Libertadores		Série B		Copa do Brasil		Total	
Number	Nationality	Position	Name	Booked	Sent off (straight red)	Booked	Sent off (straight red)	Booked	Sent off (straight red)	Booked	Sent off (straight red)	Booked	Sent off (straight red)
6	(Brazil)	DF	Juninho	2	0	0	0	0	3	0	0	3	1
4	(Brazil)	CB	Maurício Ramos	3	0	1	0	1	0	0	0	5	0
2	(Brazil)	DF	Ayrton	3	0	0	0	2	0	0	0	5	0
18	(Brazil)	MF	Márcio Araújo	2	0	0	0	0	1	0	0	2	1
3	(Brazil)	DF	Henrique	3	0	3	0	8	0	2	0	15	1
13	(Brazil)	MF	Wendel	1	0	0	0	3	0	0	0	4	0
10	(Chile)	MF	Valdivia	2	0	1	0	6	0	0	0	9	0
9	(Argentina)	FW	Hernán Barcos	1	0	0	0	0	0	0	0	1	0
5	(Brazil)	MF	João Denoni	3	0	0	0	0	0	0	0	3	0
8	(Brazil)	MF	Souza	1	0	1	0	0	0	0	0	2	0
19	(Brazil)	FW	Vinícius	0	0	2	0	0	0	0	0	2	0
11	(Brazil)	MF	Wesley	1	0	3	1	2	2	0	0	6	2
26	(Brazil)	DF	Marcelo Oliveira	3	1	1	0	1	0	0	0	5	1
38	(Brazil)	FW	Leandro	3	0	0	0	14	3	0	0	17	3
22	(Brazil)	DF	Weldinho	2	0	1	0	0	0	0	0	3	0
9	(Brazil)	FW	Kléber	1	0	2	0	0	0	0	0	3	0
15	(Brazil)	DF	Vilson	1	0	1	1	3	0	0	0	5	1
21	(Brazil)	MF	Patrick Vieira	1	0	0	0	0	0	0	0	1	0
28	(Brazil)	MF	Charles	3	0	3	0	7	1	0	0	13	1
31	(Brazil)	DF	Léo Gago	4	0	0	0	0	0	0	0	4	0
33	(Brazil)	DF	André Luiz	2	0	0	0	2	0	0	0	4	0
35	(Brazil)	DF	Marcos Vinícius	1	0	0	0	0	0	0	0	1	0
23	(Brazil)	MF	Tiago Real	1	0	1	0	1	0	0	0	3	0
27	(Brazil)	FW	Emerson	0	0	1	0	0	0	0	0	1	0
7	(Brazil)	FW	Maikon Leite	0	0	1	0	0	0	0	0	1	0
17	(Brazil)	MF	Ronny	0	0	0	0	3	1	0	0	3	1
29	(Brazil)	FW	Caio	0	0	0	0	1	0	0	0	1	0
8	(Paraguay)	FW	Mendieta	0	0	0	0	5	0	1	0	6	0
14	(Brazil)	FW	Alan Kardec	0	0	0	0	7	1	1	0	8	1
42	(Brazil)	DF	Luis Felipe	0	0	0	0	4	0	0	0	4	0
25	(Brazil)	GK	Fernando Prass	0	0	0	0	1	0	0	0	1	0
4	(Brazil)	MF	Eguren	0	0	0	0	3	0	1	0	4	0
27	(Brazil)	MF	Ananias	0	0	0	0	2	0	0	0	2	0
16	(Brazil)	DF	Fernandinho	0	0	0	0	0	0	1	0	1	0
36	(Brazil)	DF	Tiago Alves	0	0	0	0	1	0	0	0	1	0
36	(Brazil)	MF	Serginho	0	0	0	0	1	0	0	0	1	0
			TOTALS	44	0	22	3	75	10	5	0	146	13
