= Leandro (footballer, born 1993) =

Brazilian footballer

Personal information
- Full name: Weverson Leandro Oliveira Moura
- Date of birth: 12 May 1993 (age 33)
- Place of birth: Brasília, Brazil
- Height: 1.77 m (5 ft 10 in)
- Positions: Winger; forward

Team information
- Current team: Monsoon FC

Youth career
- 2007: Guará-DF
- 2008: CFZ de Brasília
- 2008–2010: Gama
- 2010–2011: Grêmio

Senior career*
Years	Team	Apps	(Gls)
2011–2013	Grêmio	44	(8)
2013	→ Palmeiras (loan)	30	(13)
2014–2018	Palmeiras	20	(1)
2015	→ Santos (loan)	14	(1)
2016	→ Coritiba (loan)	25	(5)
2017	→ Kashima Antlers (loan)	23	(11)
2018–2019	Kashima Antlers	27	(2)
2020	→ FC Tokyo (loan)	26	(9)
2021–2023	FC Tokyo	44	(12)
2024	Paysandu SC	5	(0)
2025–	Monsoon FC		

International career^{‡}
2011	Brazil U23	1	(0)
2013	Brazil U20	2	(0)
2013	Brazil	1	(1)
- * Club domestic league appearances and goals as of 5 November 2022 ‡ National team caps and goals as of 4 October 2015

Weverson Leandro Oliveira Moura (born 12 May 1993), more commonly known as Leandro, is a Brazilian footballer who last plays as a winger or a forward. He last played for J1 League club FC Tokyo.

== Club career ==
Born in Brasília, Distrito Federal, Leandro joined Grêmio's youth setup in May 2010, after impressing with Gama. He was promoted to the main squad in January of the following year, he made his senior debut on 20 February 2011, coming on as a late substitute for Fábio Rochemback and scoring the last in a 5–0 home routing of Ypiranga.

Leandro signed a five-year deal with Tricolor immediately after his 18th birthday, and made his Série A debut on 22 May, starting in a 1–2 home loss against Corinthians. On 3 August he scored his first top flight goal, netting the first in a 2–2 draw against Atlético Mineiro also at the Estádio Olímpico Monumental.

On 14 February 2013 Leandro signed a one-year loan deal with Palmeiras, along with Vilson and Léo Gago and with Hernán Barcos moving in the opposite way. He made his debut for the club seven days later, scoring the game's in a home success over União Barbarense.

Leandro scored 13 league goals in 30 appearances, helping Verdão return to the main category at first attempt. On 10 January 2014, he signed a four-year permanent deal with the club, for a €5 million fee.

On 3 August 2015 Leandro was loaned to Santos, until December.

On 2 February 2016 Leandro was loaned to Coritiba.

In 2017 Leandro was loaned to Kashima Antlers.

== International career ==
Leandro has represented Brazil in the 2011 Pan American Games, and also featured with the under-20s in 2013 South American Youth Football Championship. On 2 April 2013, Leandro was called up by Felipão for the main squad to play a friendly against Bolivia; he made his full international debut four days later, replacing Ronaldinho Gaúcho and scoring the last in a 4–0 away win.

== Career statistics ==
=== Club ===
As of match played 30 March 2024

Appearances and goals by club, season and competition
Club	Season	League			State League		Cup		League Cup		Continental		Other		Total	
Club	Season	Division	Apps	Goals	Apps	Goals	Apps	Goals	Apps	Goals	Apps	Goals	Apps	Goals	Apps	Goals
Grêmio	2011	Série A	22	1	12	7	0	0	—		2	0	—		36	8
Grêmio	2012	Série A	22	7	9	0	4	0	—		3	0	—		38	7
Grêmio	2013	Série A	0	0	2	0	0	0	—		0	0	—		2	0
Grêmio	Total		44	8	23	7	4	0	—		5	0	—		76	15
Palmeiras	2013	Série B	30	13	11	6	1	0	—		0	0	—		42	19
Palmeiras	2014	Série A	18	1	10	1	6	1	—		—		—		34	3
Palmeiras	2015	Série A	2	0	0	0	2	0	—		—		—		4	0
Palmeiras	Total		50	14	21	7	9	1	—		0	0	—		80	22
Santos	2015	Série A	14	1	—		0	0	—		—		—		14	1
Coritiba	2016	Série A	25	5	13	2	3	2	—		4 (Note: All appearance(s) in Copa Sudamericana)	1	3 (Note: All appearance(s) in Primeira Liga)	2	48	12
Kashima Antlers (loan)	2017	J1 League	23	11	—		1	0	1 (Note: All appearance(s) in J.League Cup)	0	5	0	0 (Note: All appearance(s) in Japanese Super Cup)	0	30	11
Kashima Antlers	2018	J1 League	5	0	—		1	0	0	0	1	1	2 (Note: All appearance(s) in FIFA Club World Cup)	0	9	1
Kashima Antlers	2019	J1 League	22	2	—		1	1	2	0	—		—		25	3
Kashima Antlers	Kashima total		50	13	—		3	1	3	0	6	1	2	0	64	15
FC Tokyo (loan)	2020	J1 League	26	9	—		—		3	3	8	2	—		37	14
FC Tokyo	2021	J1 League	22	7	—		1	0	7	2	—		—		30	9
FC Tokyo	2022	J1 League	20	5	—		1	1	0	0	—		—		21	6
FC Tokyo	2023	J1 League	0	0	—		0	0	1	0	—		—		1	0
FC Tokyo	Tokyo total		68	21	—		2	1	11	5	8	2	—		89	29
Paysandu	2024	Série B	0	0	4	0	0	0	—		—		1	0	5	0
Career total			250	62	57	16	21	5	14	5	25	4	5	2	370	94

=== International ===
As of 6 April 2013

Brazil
Year	Apps	Goals
2013	1	1
Total	1	1

=== International goals ===
Scores and results list Brazil's goal tally first.

No	Date	Venue	Opponent	Score	Result	Competition
1.	6 April 2013	Estadio Ramón Tahuichi Aguilera, Santa Cruz de la Sierra, Bolivia	Bolivia	4–0	4–0	Friendly

== Honours ==
=== Club ===
Palmeiras

- Copa do Brasil: 2015
- Campeonato Brasileiro Série B: 2013

Kashima Antlers

- AFC Champions League: 2018
- Japanese Super Cup: 2017

FC Tokyo

- J.League Cup: 2020

=== International ===
Brazil U20

- Toulon Tournament: 2014

=== Individual ===
- J.League Cup MVP: 2020
