= List of Portuguese football transfers winter 2014–15 =

This is a list of Portuguese winter football transfers for the 2014–15 season. The winter transfer window opened on 1 January 2015 and closed on 31 January 2015. Players could be bought before the transfer window opened, but were not permitted to join their new clubs until 1 January. Additionally, players without a club could join at any time and clubs were able to sign a goalkeeper on an emergency loan if they had no registered goalkeeper available. Only moves involving Primeira Liga clubs are listed; included are clubs that completed transfers after the closing of the summer 2014 transfer window due to other domestic leagues having a later closure date to their transfer window.

== Transfers ==
Date	Name	Moving from	Moving to	Fee
9 September 2014	(Portugal) Rui Miguel	(Portugal) Paços de Ferreira	(Romania) Rapid București	Free
9 September 2014	(Portugal) Rúben Brígido	(Portugal) Marítimo	(Romania) Oțelul Galați	Free
11 September 2014	(Brazil) Jonas	Unattached	(Portugal) Benfica	Free
24 September 2014	(Portugal) Carlos Martins	Unattached	(Portugal) Belenenses	Free
4 October 2014	(Nigeria) Michael Uchebo	Unattached	(Portugal) Boavista	Free
4 October 2014	(Nigeria) Reuben Gabriel	Unattached	(Portugal) Boavista	Free
14 November 2014	(Brazil) Kanu	Unattached	(Portugal) Vitória de Guimarães	Free
6 December 2014	(Angola) Fredy	(Portugal) Belenenses	(Angola) Recreativo do Libolo	Free
15 December 2014	(Brazil) Christian	(Romania) Cluj	(Portugal) Nacional	Free
15 December 2014	(Portugal) Ricardo Valente	(Portugal) Leixões	(Portugal) Vitória de Guimarães	Free
15 December 2014	(France) Steven Thicot	Unattached	(Portugal) Belenenses	Free
23 December 2014	(Portugal) Nélson Oliveira	(Portugal) Benfica	(England) Swansea City	Loan
26 December 2014	(Brazil) Flávio Boaventura	(Portugal) Paços de Ferreira	(Brazil) América de Natal	Free
26 December 2014	(Portugal) Luís Aurélio	(Portugal) Moreirense	(Portugal) Nacional	Free
27 December 2014	(Portugal) Capela	(Portugal) Penafiel	(Angola) Bravos do Maquis	Free
29 December 2014	(Portugal) Dénis Duarte	(Portugal) Torreense	(Portugal) Vitória de Guimarães	Free
2 January 2015	(Argentina) Enzo Pérez	(Portugal) Benfica	(Spain) Valencia	€25,000,000
2 January 2015	(Portugal) Tijane Reis	Unattached	(Portugal) Estoril	Free
5 January 2015	(Slovakia) Marek Čech	(Italy) Bologna	(Portugal) Boavista	Free
5 January 2015	(Brazil) Léo Bonatini	(Brazil) Cruzeiro	(Portugal) Estoril	Loan
5 January 2015	(Brazil) Luís Felipe	(Portugal) Benfica	(Brazil) Joinville	Loan
7 January 2015	(Portugal) Rúben Pinto	(Portugal) Benfica	(Portugal) Paços de Ferreira	Loan
7 January 2015	(Egypt) Hossam Hassan	(Portugal) Gil Vicente	(Egypt) Ittihad Alexandria	Loan
8 January 2015	(Portugal) Bebé	(Portugal) Benfica	(Spain) Córdoba	Loan
9 January 2015	(Argentina) José Luis Fernández	(Portugal) Benfica	(Argentina) Rosario Central	Undisclosed
9 January 2015	(Brazil) Mateus	(Brazil) Palmeiras	(Portugal) Vitória de Guimarães	Free
10 January 2015	(Ivory Coast) Adama Traoré	(Portugal) Vitória de Guimarães	(Switzerland) Basel	Undisclosed
10 January 2015	(Portugal) Cadú	(Cyprus) AEL Limassol	(Portugal) Gil Vicente	Free
12 January 2015	(Portugal) Hélio Cruz	(Portugal) Moreirense	(Portugal) Ribeirão	Loan
12 January 2015	(Cape Verde) Kuca	(Portugal) Estoril	(Turkey) Karabükspor	Undisclosed
12 January 2015	(South Korea) Suk Hyun-jun	(Portugal) Nacional	(Portugal) Vitória de Setúbal	Free
15 January 2015	(Portugal) Fábio Cardoso	(Portugal) Benfica	(Portugal) Paços de Ferreira	Loan
15 January 2015	(Germany) Hany Mukhtar	(Germany) Hertha Berlin	(Portugal) Benfica	Undisclosed
16 January 2015	(Portugal) Iuri Medeiros	(Portugal) Sporting CP	(Portugal) Arouca	Loan
16 January 2015	(Cameroon) Fabrice Fokobo	(Portugal) Sporting CP	(Portugal) Arouca	Loan
19 January 2015	(Portugal) Hélder Costa	(Portugal) Benfica	(Spain) Deportivo La Coruña	Loan
20 January 2015	(Portugal) Bernardo Silva	(Portugal) Benfica	(France) Monaco	€15,750,000
21 January 2015	(Brazil) Maurício	(Portugal) Sporting CP	(Italy) Lazio	Loan
21 January 2015	(Ghana) Daniel Opare	(Portugal) Porto	(Turkey) Beşiktaş	Loan
21 January 2015	(Brazil) Ewerton	(Russia) Anzhi Makhachkala	(Portugal) Sporting CP	Loan
22 January 2015	(Belgium) Joris Kayembe	(Portugal) Porto	(Portugal) Arouca	Loan
22 January 2015	(Portugal) Renato Santos	(Portugal) Rio Ave	(Portugal) Tondela	Loan
23 January 2015	(Portugal) Artur Jorge	(Portugal) Braga	(Portugal) Freamunde	Loan
24 January 2015	(Argentina) Franco Jara	(Portugal) Benfica	(Greece) Olympiacos	Undisclosed
26 January 2015	(Portugal) Yannick Djaló	(Portugal) Benfica	(Russia) Mordovia Saransk	Loan
26 January 2015	(Portugal) Rochinha	(Portugal) Benfica	(England) Bolton Wanderers	Loan
26 January 2015	(Portugal) Yazalde	(Portugal) Braga	(Portugal) Gil Vicente	Loan
26 January 2015	(Portugal) Hugo Monteiro	(Portugal) Arouca	(Portugal) Leixões	Loan
27 January 2015	(Portugal) Bruno Braga	(Angola) Benfica Luanda	(Portugal) Penafiel	Free
27 January 2015	(Portugal) João Amorim	(Portugal) Benfica	(Portugal) Desportivo das Aves	Free
27 January 2015	(Portugal) Ricardo Esgaio	(Portugal) Sporting CP	(Portugal) Académica de Coimbra	Loan
27 January 2015	(Guinea) Salim Cissé	(Portugal) Sporting CP	(Portugal) Académica de Coimbra	Loan
28 January 2015	(Cape Verde) Héldon	(Portugal) Sporting CP	(Spain) Córdoba	Loan
29 January 2015	(Uruguay) Jonathan Rodríguez	(Uruguay) Peñarol	(Portugal) Benfica	Loan
29 January 2015	(Uruguay) Elbio Álvarez	(Uruguay) Peñarol	(Portugal) Benfica	Undisclosed
29 January 2015	(Portugal) Daniel Candeias	(Portugal) Benfica	(Spain) Granada	Loan
30 January 2015	(Portugal) Wilson Eduardo	(Portugal) Sporting CP	(Netherlands) ADO Den Haag	Loan
30 January 2015	(Portugal) Mattheus	(Brazil) Flamengo	(Portugal) Estoril	Loan
30 January 2015	(Austria) Markus Berger	(Russia) FC Ural	(Portugal) Gil Vicente	Free
31 January 2015	(Brazil) Lucas Souza	(Italy) Parma	(Portugal) Moreirense	Loan
1 February 2015	(Gabon) Aaron Appindangoyé	(Gabon) Mounana	(Portugal) Boavista	Free
1 February 2015	(France) Moussa Marega	(Tunisia) Espérance de Tunis	(Portugal) Marítimo	Free
1 February 2015	(Portugal) Flávio Silva	(Portugal) Torreense	(Portugal) Benfica	Undisclosed
2 February 2015	(Mali) Ulysse Diallo	(Portugal) Arouca	(Portugal) Académica de Coimbra	Free
2 February 2015	(Spain) Ustaritz Aldekoaotalora	(Portugal) Arouca	(Portugal) Penafiel	Free
2 February 2015	(Bulgaria) Simeon Slavchev	(Portugal) Sporting CP	(England) Bolton Wanderers	Loan
2 February 2015	(Brazil) Michel	(Portugal) Benfica	(Portugal) Penafiel	Free
2 February 2015	(Brazil) Carlos David	(Portugal) Vilafranquense	(Portugal) Benfica	Loan
2 February 2015	(Russia) Vitali Lystsov	(Portugal) União de Leiria	(Portugal) Benfica	Loan
2 February 2015	(Serbia) Filip Đuričić	(Portugal) Benfica	(England) Southampton	Loan
2 February 2015	(Portugal) Rui Fonte	(Portugal) Benfica	(Portugal) Belenenses	Loan
2 February 2015	(Portugal) Serginho	Unattached	(Portugal) Académico de Viseu	Free
2 February 2015	(Angola) Dolly Menga	(Portugal) Benfica	(Portugal) Braga	Undisclosed
5 February 2015	(Uruguay) Gianni Rodríguez	(Portugal) Benfica	(Uruguay) Peñarol	Loan
9 February 2015	(Portugal) Steven Vitória	(Portugal) Benfica	(United States) Philadelphia Union	Loan
17 February 2015	(Brazil) Rodrigo Defendi	(Portugal) Vitória de Guimarães	(China) Shijiazhuang Ever Bright	Free
27 February 2015	(Portugal) David Caiado	(Portugal) Vitória de Guimarães	(Ukraine) Metalist Kharkiv	Free

- ^1 Some players may have been bought after the end of the 2014 summer transfer window in Portugal but before the end of that country's transfer window closed.
