= Luís Felipe (footballer, born 1991) =

Brazilian footballer (born 1991)

Personal information
- Full name: Luís Felipe Dias do Nascimento
- Date of birth: 8 April 1991 (age 35)
- Place of birth: São Paulo, Brazil
- Height: 1.80 m (5 ft 11 in)
- Position: Right back

Team information
- Current team: Portuguesa Santista

Youth career
- 2006–2007: Santos
- 2007–2011: Palmeiras

Senior career*
| Years | Team | Apps | (Gls) |
| 2010–2011 | Palmeiras B | 14 | (1) |
| 2010–2014 | Palmeiras | 28 | (1) |
| 2011 | → Bragantino (loan) | 10 | (3) |
| 2012 | → Mogi Mirim (loan) | 0 | (0) |
| 2012 | → Boa (loan) | 6 | (0) |
| 2013 | → Penapolense (loan) | 0 | (0) |
| 2014–2017 | Benfica | 0 | (0) |
| 2014 | → Criciúma (loan) | 10 | (1) |
| 2015 | → Joinville (loan) | 0 | (0) |
| 2015 | → Paysandu (loan) | 7 | (0) |
| 2016 | → Rio Claro (loan) | 0 | (0) |
| 2016 | → Oeste (loan) | 2 | (0) |
| 2017–2018 | Vitória de Setúbal | 3 | (0) |
| 2018 | São Caetano | 0 | (0) |
| 2019 | Villa Nova | 0 | (0) |
| 2020– | Portuguesa Santista | 0 | (0) |
- * Club domestic league appearances and goals as of 22:23, 16 September 2020 (UTC)

Luís Felipe Dias do Nascimento (born 8 April 1991) is a Brazilian professional footballer who plays as a right back for Portuguesa Santista.

== Club career ==
Luís Felipe began his career with Santos, but was released in 2006. He trialed with Corithians but was not offered a contract. In 2007, he signed with Palmeiras, spending 3 years in their youth team, being an important player in the team that reached the semifinals of the Copa São Paulo Junior in 2010.

On 24 October 2010, he made his debut as professional, because the team had no right back available to face their rival Corinthians, since the starter Vítor was injured, and midfielder Márcio Araújo, who also plays right back, was injured too. Although Palmeiras was defeated, Luís Filipe received compliments from Luiz Felipe Scolari.

A series of loan deals followed, in 2011 he was loaned to Bragantino, in 2012 to Mogi Mirim and Boa and in 2013 to Penapolense.

With the end of the São Paulo State Championship of 2013, he returned to Palmeiras, where he earned a position in the starting eleven after taking it out of Ayrton. A bureaucratic problem when he renewed his contract in October 2013, which was supposed to end in 2014, but because of a typing error, ended in 2013, caused Luís Filipe to be sidelined.

On 4 July 2014, after months without playing, he signed with Portuguese champions Benfica after "following Benfica for a long time". However, a month later, after the pre-season, Luís Filipe returned to Brazil on loan to Criciúma until the end of the season.

On 5 January 2015, he was loaned to Joinville Esporte Clube until 31 December 2015. On 12 May, after failing to impress with the club, he moved to Paysandu on loan until the end of the year. He was then loaned to Rio Claro Futebol Clube. After that, he joined Oeste Futebol Clube also on loan until December 2016. On 31 January 2017, he terminated his contract with Benfica and signed with Vitória de Setúbal.

== Honours ==
Palmeiras

- Campeonato Brasileiro Série B: 2013
