= Fernandinho (footballer, born August 1985) =

Brazilian footballer

Personal information
- Full name: Fernando Galhardo Borges
- Date of birth: August 31, 1985 (age 41)
- Place of birth: Cianorte, Brazil
- Height: 5 ft 11 in (1.80 m)
- Position: Left-back

Team information
- Current team: Botafogo–SP

Senior career*
Years	Team	Apps	(Gls)
2004–2010	Cianorte		
2007	→ Marília (loan)		
2008	→ Oeste (loan)		
2008	→ Vila Nova (loan)		(2)
2009	→ Vasco da Gama (loan)	3	(0)
2009	→ Marília (loan)	7	(0)
2010	→ Oeste (loan)	0	(0)
2010–2016	Oeste	46	(0)
2010	→ São Caetano (loan)	12	(1)
2011	→ Sport (loan)	8	(0)
2011	→ Avaí (loan)	11	(0)
2012–2013	→ Palmeiras (loan)	18	(1)
2016	→ Tombense (loan)	15	(0)
2017	Botafogo–SP	4	(0)
2017–2018	Ponte Preta	9	(0)
2018–2020	Cianorte	20	(1)
2020	Brasiliense	6	(0)
- * Club domestic league appearances and goals as of 17:09, 17 August 2024 (UTC)

Fernando Galhardo Borges (born 31 August 1985, in Cianorte), better known as Fernandinho, is a Brazilian former footballer who played as a left-back.

== Club career ==
On 18 April 2012, Fernandinho signed a loan with Palmeiras.

== Honours ==
Palmeiras

- Copa do Brasil: 2012
- Campeonato Brasileiro Série B: 2013

== See also ==
- List of Sociedade Esportiva Palmeiras players
