= Charles (footballer, born 1985) =

Brazilian footballer

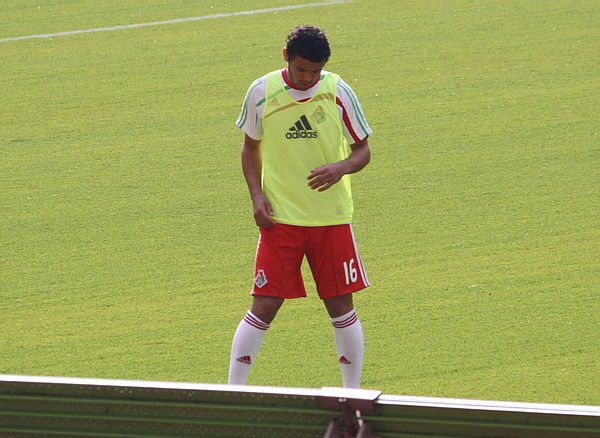

Personal information
- Full name: Charles Fernando Basílio da Silva
- Date of birth: 14 February 1985 (age 41)
- Place of birth: Rio de Janeiro, Brazil
- Height: 1.73 m (5 ft 8 in)
- Position: Central midfielder

Youth career
- 2003–2005: Cruzeiro

Senior career*
Years	Team	Apps	(Gls)
2005–2008	Cruzeiro	67	(7)
2005	→ Ipatinga (loan)	5	(0)
2006	→ Cabofriense (loan)	2	(0)
2006–2007	→ Ipatinga (loan)	18	(0)
2008–2011	Lokomotiv Moscow	19	(0)
2011	→ Santos (loan)	4	(0)
2011	→ Cruzeiro (loan)	16	(4)
2012–2015	Cruzeiro	50	(3)
2013	→ Palmeiras (loan)	26	(3)
2016–2020	Antalyaspor	105	(2)
- * Club domestic league appearances and goals

Charles Fernando Basílio da Silva or simply Charles (born 14 February 1985), is a Brazilian former football defensive midfielder.

== Career ==
Da Silva arrived at Cruzeiro in October 2003, at age 18, as a defender in the junior team. He was loaned to Ipatinga in 2005, when he won the State Championship. The next year, he was a defender with Cabofriense and returned to Ipatinga for the 2006 and 2007 seasons. Da Silva returned to Cruzeiro in May 2007 for his first opportunity in the professional team, where he remained until the end of August 2008, when 70% of rights were traded to Lokomotiv Moscow of Russia.

He played 67 games for Cruzeiro and scored 7 goals.

On 4 February 2013, in an exchange for Luan, he signed for Palmeiras until the end of season.

== Honours ==
Ipatinga

- Campeonato Mineiro: 2005

Cruzeiro

- Campeonato Mineiro: 2008

Santos

- Campeonato Paulista: 2011
- Copa Libertadores: 2011

Palmeiras

- Campeonato Brasileiro Série B: 2013
