= Ronny (footballer, born 1991) =

Brazilian footballer

Personal information
- Full name: Ronieri da Silva Pinto
- Date of birth: August 19, 1991 (age 35)
- Place of birth: Cuiabá, Mato Grosso, Brazil
- Height: 1.76 m (5 ft 9 in)
- Position: Striker

Team information
- Current team: Metropolitano
- Number: 11

Youth career
- 2007–2008: Cuiabá
- 2008–2009: Criciúma

Senior career*
| Years | Team | Apps | (Gls) |
| 2008–2010 | Criciúma | 39 | (9) |
| 2011–2014 | Vitesse | 6 | (0) |
| 2012 | → Figueirense (loan) | 40 | (12) |
| 2013 | → Palmeiras (loan) | 23 | (3) |
| 2014–2015 | Botafogo | 4 | (0) |
| 2016–2018 | Nautico | 8 | (0) |
| 2016 | → Cuiabá (loan) | 1 | (0) |
| 2016–2017 | → Confiança (loan) | 16 | (1) |
| 2017 | → Remo (loan) | 2 | (0) |
| 2018 | Itumbiara | 10 | (1) |
| 2018 | Guarani de Palhoça | 8 | (2) |
| 2019 | Curitibanos | 7 | (1) |
| 2020 | Atlético Catarinense | 9 | (8) |
| 2020 | União Esporte | 11 | (5) |
| 2021–2022 | Camboriú | 26 | (4) |
| 2022– | Metropolitano | 1 | (1) |
- * Club domestic league appearances and goals

Ronieri da Silva Pinto (August 19, 1991 in Cuiabá), commonly known as Ronny, is a Brazilian attacking midfielder who plays for Itumbiara.

== Honours ==
Palmeiras

- Campeonato Brasileiro Série B: 2013
