= Wendel (footballer, born 1981) =

Brazilian footballer

Personal information
- Full name: Wendel Santana Pereira Santos
- Date of birth: 8 October 1981 (age 45)
- Place of birth: Itapetinga–BA–Brazil
- Height: 1.77 m (5 ft 10 in)
- Positions: Defensive midfielder; right-back

Youth career
- 1999: Vitória
- 1999: Joseense

Senior career*
Years	Team	Apps	(Gls)
2000	União Mogi		
2001–2002	Iraty		
2002	Juventus-SP		
2003–2014	Palmeiras		
2008	→ Santos (loan)		
2010	→ Goiás (loan)		
2011	→ Atlético Paranaense (loan)		
2012	→ Grêmio Barueri (loan)		
2012	→ Ponte Preta (loan)		
2015–2016	Boa Esporte		
- * Club domestic league appearances and goals

Wendel Santana Pereira Santos (born 8 October 1981), known as Wendel, is a Brazilian former professional footballer who played as a defensive midfielder or right-back.

In December 2012, after backing to Palmeiras wished by Gilson Kleina, Wendel said he had been disrespected by Felipão, former coach of the club, that sent the player for loans.

== Honours ==
Iraty

- Paraná State Championship: 2002

Palmeiras

- São Paulo State Championship: 2008
- Campeonato Brasileiro Série B: 2013
