= William Mendieta =

Paraguayan footballer (born 1989)

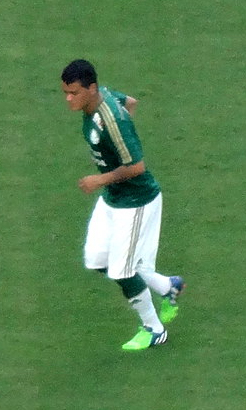
- Mendieta playing for Palmeiras in 2015

Personal information
- Full name: William Gabriel Mendieta Pintos
- Date of birth: 9 January 1989 (age 37)
- Place of birth: Asunción, Paraguay
- Height: 1.74 m (5 ft 9 in)
- Position: Attacking midfielder

Team information
- Current team: Guaraní
- Number: 10

Youth career
- Libertad

Senior career*
Years	Team	Apps	(Gls)
2009–2013	Libertad	40	(11)
2011	→ Rubio Ñu (loan)	17	(1)
2012	→ Sol de América (loan)	17	(1)
2013–2016	Palmeiras	28	(4)
2015–2016	→ Olimpia (loan)	59	(26)
2017–2021	Olimpia	56	(25)
2020–2021	→ FC Juárez (loan)	19	(1)
2022–2024	Libertad	56	(8)
2025–	Guaraní	19	(4)

International career
2012–2018	Paraguay	2	(0)
- * Club domestic league appearances and goals as of 12 August 2025

William Gabriel Mendieta Pintos (born 9 January 1989) is a Paraguayan professional footballer who plays for Guaraní as an attacking midfielder or winger. He made two appearances for the Paraguay national team.

== Club career ==
Born in Asunción, Mendieta has played for Libertad, Rubio Ñu and Sol de América.

In 2013, Mendieta completed a transfer to Palmeiras for around US$2 million.

== International career ==
Mendieta made his international debut for Paraguay in 2012.

== Honours ==
Palmeiras

- Campeonato Brasileiro Série B: 2013
