= André Luiz (footballer, born 1980) =

Brazilian footballer

Personal information
- Full name: André Luiz Silva do Nascimento
- Date of birth: 27 January 1980 (age 46)
- Place of birth: São João del Rei, Brazil
- Height: 1.85 m (6 ft 1 in)
- Position: Defender

Senior career*
Years	Team	Apps	(Gls)
2000	Cruzeiro		
2001	Ipatinga		
2002	Tupi		
2003–2005	Atlético Mineiro	72	(5)
2005–2013	Nancy	199	(16)
2013	Palmeiras	21	(1)
- * Club domestic league appearances and goals

André Luiz Silva do Nascimento (born 27 January 1980), or simply André Luiz, is a Brazilian former professional footballer who played as a defender.

== Career ==
André Luiz was born in São João del Rei, Minas Gerais State. He played for Tupi Minas before transferred to Clube Atlético Mineiro in 2003.

He signed by AS Nancy in summer 2005. He won 2006 Coupe de la Ligue.

He acquired French nationality by naturalization in May 2009.

== Honours ==
Nancy

- Coupe de la Ligue: 2005–06

Palmeiras

- Campeonato Brasileiro Série B: 2013
