= Kléber (footballer, born 1990) =

Brazilian footballer

Personal information
- Full name: Kléber Laube Pinheiro
- Date of birth: 2 May 1990 (age 36)
- Place of birth: Estância Velha, Brazil
- Height: 1.88 m (6 ft 2 in)
- Position: Striker

Youth career
- 2004: Caxias–RS
- 2004–2005: Fabril
- 2006: Vila Nova
- 2007–2009: Atlético Mineiro

Senior career*
Years	Team	Apps	(Gls)
2009–2011	Atlético Mineiro	9	(1)
2009–2011	→ Marítimo (loan)	38	(15)
2011–2015	Porto	26	(9)
2013	→ Palmeiras (loan)	7	(2)
2013–2014	Porto B	15	(3)
2014–2015	→ Estoril (loan)	21	(8)
2015–2016	Beijing Guoan	11	(0)
2016–2019	Estoril	48	(16)
2019	→ JEF United Chiba (loan)	38	(17)
2020	JEF United Chiba	27	(7)
2021–2022	Yokohama FC	32	(6)
Total		272	(84)

International career
2011	Brazil	2	(0)
- * Club domestic league appearances and goals

Kléber Laube Pinheiro (born 2 May 1990), known simply as Kléber, is a Brazilian former professional footballer who played as a striker.

== Club career ==
=== Brazil ===
Born in Estância Velha, Rio Grande do Sul, Kléber started his career with Clube Atlético Mineiro, also having finished his development at the Belo Horizonte club. On 21 February 2009, he played his first match for the first team, against Rio Branco Esporte Clube in the Campeonato Mineiro.

=== Marítimo ===
In summer 2009, the 19-year-old Kléber left his country and signed for C.S. Marítimo in Portugal, on loan. He made his Primeira Liga debut on 20 September, featuring ten minutes in a 2–1 away loss against Madeira neighbours C.D. Nacional.

Kléber – who also scored three times in only four games with the reserves in the third division – finished his first season with eight goals from 20 appearances, notably netting twice in the last round, a 2–1 away win against Vitória S.C. which meant his team leapfrogged their opponents and finished fifth, with the subsequent qualification for the UEFA Europa League.

After reported interest from FC Porto, Kléber refused to start 2010–11 with Marítimo, even though he still had another year on his contract. Atlético Mineiro accepted the deal but the Portuguese did not, and he eventually finished the campaign with seven league goals, eight in all competitions.

=== Porto ===
Kléber finally moved to Porto on 4 July 2011 for a fee of €2.3 million, signing a five-year contract. He scored five goals in five matches during pre-season, and three in the first seven competitive fixtures, including the winner in a 2–1 home victory over FC Shakhtar Donetsk in the group stage of the UEFA Champions League.

On 7 February 2013, Kléber returned to his country and joined SE Palmeiras on loan. The move was initially until 30 June, extendable if the side advanced to the semi-finals in the Copa Libertadores.

For 2014–15, Kléber was loaned to G.D. Estoril Praia. On 18 January 2015, he helped his team to come from behind at Boavista F.C. and win 2–1.

=== China ===
On 14 July 2015, Kléber signed a two-and-a-half-year deal with Beijing Guoan FC. He made his Chinese Super League debut six days later, as a late substitute in the 0–0 home draw with Shanghai Port FC.

=== Estoril ===
Kléber returned to Estoril in August 2016, on a two-year contract. He scored eight goals in the first season in his second spell, in a tenth-place finish.

=== Later career ===
Aged 29, Kléber moved to Japan, where he represented JEF United Chiba (J2 League) and Yokohama FC (both J1 League and second tier).

== International career ==
On 10 November 2011, courtesy of his Porto performances, Kléber made his debut for Brazil, appearing in a friendly with Gabon.

== Career statistics ==
Appearances and goals by club, season and competition
Club	Season	League			State league		National cup (Note: Includes Copa do Brasil, Taça de Portugal and Emperor's Cup)		League cup (Note: Includes Taça da Liga and J.League Cup)		Continental		Other		Total	
Club	Season	Division	Apps	Goals	Apps	Goals	Apps	Goals	Apps	Goals	Apps	Goals	Apps	Goals	Apps	Goals
Atlético Mineiro	2009	Série A	4	0	5 (Note: Appearances in Campeonato Mineiro)	1	1	0	—		—		—		10	1
Marítimo (loan)	2009–10	Primeira Liga	20	8	—		0	0	1	0	—		—		21	8
Marítimo (loan)	2010–11	Primeira Liga	18	7	—		2	1	0	0	—		—		20	8
Marítimo (loan)	Total		38	15	—		2	1	1	0	—		—		41	16
Porto	2011–12	Primeira Liga	21	9	—		1	0	3	0	6 (Note: Five appearances and one goal in UEFA Champions League, one appearance in UEFA Europa League)	1	2 (Note: One appearance in Supertaça Cândido de Oliveira, one appearance in UEFA Super Cup)	0	33	10
Porto	2012–13	Primeira Liga	5	0	—		3	1	0	0	2 (Note: Appearances in UEFA Champions League)	0	0	0	10	1
Porto	Total		26	9	—		4	1	3	0	8	1	2	0	43	11
Palmeiras (loan)	2013	Série B	2	1	5 (Note: Appearances in Campeonato Paulista)	1	0	0	—		4 (Note: Appearances in Copa Libertadores)	0	—		11	2
Porto B	2013–14	Segunda Liga	15	3	—		—		—		—		—		15	3
Estoril (loan)	2014–15	Primeira Liga	21	8	—		1	0	3	2	5 (Note: Appearances in UEFA Europa League)	2	—		30	12
Beijing Guoan	2015	Chinese Super League	7	0	—		0	0	—		0	0	—		7	0
Beijing Guoan	2016	Chinese Super League	4	0	—		0	0	—		—		—		4	0
Beijing Guoan	Total		11	0	—		0	0	—		0	0	—		11	0
Estoril	2016–17	Primeira Liga	26	8	—		5	2	0	0	—		—		31	10
Estoril	2017–18	Primeira Liga	17	6	—		1	0	1	0	—		—		19	6
Estoril	2018–19	Primeira Liga	5	2	—		0	0	1	1	—		—		6	3
Estoril	Total		48	16	—		6	2	2	1	—		—		56	19
JEF United (loan)	2019	J2 League	38	17	—		0	0	—		—		—		38	17
JEF United	2020	J2 League	27	7	—		0	0	—		—		—		27	7
JEF United	Total		65	24	—		0	0	—		—		—		65	24
Yokohama FC	2021	J1 League	20	3	—		1	1	4	2	—		—		25	6
Yokohama FC	2022	J2 League	12	3	—		0	0	—		—		—		12	3
Yokohama FC	Total		32	6	—		1	1	4	2	—		—		37	9
Career total			262	82	10	2	15	5	13	5	17	3	2	0	319	97
