= Caio Mancha =

Brazilian footballer (born 1992)

Personal information
- Full name: Caio Danilo Laursen Tuponi
- Date of birth: 22 September 1992 (age 34)
- Place of birth: Presidente Prudente, Brazil
- Height: 1.88 m (6 ft 2 in)
- Position: Forward

Team information
- Current team: Hercílio Luz

Youth career
- Palmeiras

Senior career*
Years	Team	Apps	(Gls)
2012–2016	Palmeiras	24	(1)
2014	→ Portuguesa (loan)	17	(2)
2015	→ Guarani (loan)	2	(0)
2016	→ Rio Claro (loan)	0	(0)
2016–2017	ABC	42	(9)
2018–2019	Ferroviária	9	(2)
2019	Taubaté	13	(6)
2019	Votuporanguense	4	(0)
2020	XV de Piracicaba	14	(5)
2020	Santa Cruz	7	(2)
2021	Pelotas	8	(0)
2021–2022	Portuguesa	29	(10)
2023	Portuguesa Santista	17	(8)
2023	Londrina	14	(1)
2023	Floresta	3	(0)
2024	FAS	0	(0)
2024	Villa Nova	7	(2)
2024	Velo Clube	6	(2)
2024–	Hercílio Luz	13	(4)
- * Club domestic league appearances and goals as of 15:29, 8 August 2024 (UTC)

Caio Danilo Laursen Tuponi, simply known as Caio Mancha (born 22 September 1992), is a Brazilian footballer who plays as a forward for Hercílio Luz.

== Honours ==
Palmeiras

- Campeonato Brasileiro Série B: 2013

Portuguesa

- Campeonato Paulista Série A2: 2022
