= Souza (footballer, born 1988) =

Brazilian footballer

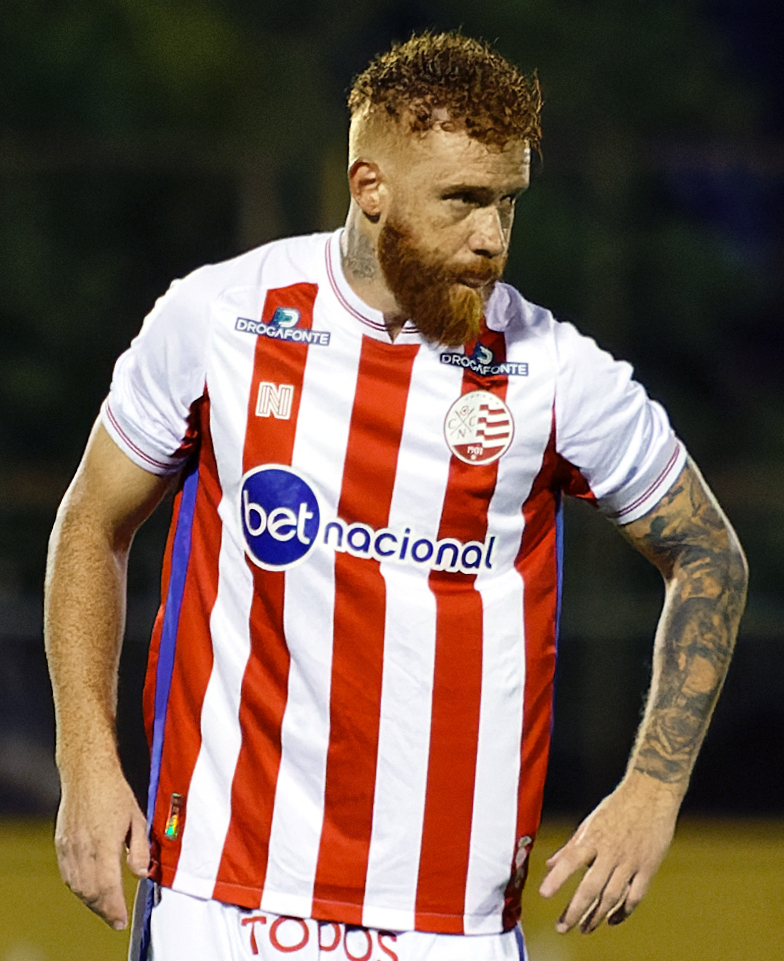
- Souza in 2023

Personal information
- Full name: Elierce Barbosa de Souza
- Date of birth: March 8, 1988 (age 38)
- Place of birth: Posse, Brazil
- Height: 1.83 m (6 ft 0 in)
- Positions: Defensive midfielder; right back

Team information
- Current team: América de Natal

Youth career
- Atlético Goianiense

Senior career*
| Years | Team | Apps | (Gls) |
| 2007 | Ceilândia | 3 | (3) |
| 2007 | Brasília | 3 | (3) |
| 2008 | Dom Pedro | 49 | (3) |
| 2008–2009 | Palmeiras B | 0 | (0) |
| 2009–2013 | Palmeiras | 31 | (0) |
| 2010 | → Ponte Preta (loan) | 28 | (4) |
| 2011 | → São Caetano (loan) | 33 | (5) |
| 2012 | → Náutico (loan) | 35 | (7) |
| 2013 | → Cruzeiro (loan) | 13 | (2) |
| 2014–2016 | Cruzeiro | 5 | (1) |
| 2014 | → Santos (loan) | 18 | (0) |
| 2015 | → Bahia (loan) | 8 | (0) |
| 2016 | → Cerezo Osaka (loan) | 41 | (8) |
| 2017–2019 | Cerezo Osaka | 74 | (11) |
| 2020–2022 | Al-Ettifaq | 63 | (6) |
| 2022 | Khor Fakkan | 12 | (2) |
| 2022–2023 | Náutico | 46 | (10) |
| 2023 | → Ponte Preta (loan) | 3 | (0) |
| 2024– | América de Natal | 65 | (18) |
- * Club domestic league appearances and goals as of 8 February 2026

Elierce Barbosa de Souza or simply Souza (Portuguese pronunciation: [ˈso(w)zɐ]; born 8 March 1988) is a Brazilian footballer who plays for América de Natal, as a defensive midfielder.

== Career ==
Souza began his career playing for various teams in the Federal District, as Ceilândia, Brasília and Dom Pedro.

He made his first team debut for the former on 25 August 2007 in a 0–1 home loss against Capital and scored his first goal in a 2–0 home win against Renovo.

He faced several difficulties, such as living with hunger, sometimes going to training without breakfast, not having enough to eat. He thought of giving up the dream of being a player and for a time did: he gave up football and returned to Posse, his hometown, to work as a bricklayer. In 2008, he revived the dream of being a football player and went to Dom Pedro II in Brasília. He stood out, and was pointed out by many as the best midfielder of the Brasiliense Championship. He was hired by Palmeiras and spent time in Palmeiras B, then, having stood out again, was promoted by Vanderlei Luxemburgo Palmeiras to the first team.

== Career statistics ==
=== Club ===
As of match played 24 February 2026.

Appearances and goals by club, season and competition
| Club | Season | League | | | State League | | National Cup | | League Cup | | Continental | | Other | | Total | |
| Club | Season | Division | Apps | Goals | Apps | Goals | Apps | Goals | Apps | Goals | Apps | Goals | Apps | Goals | Apps | Goals |
|---|---|---|---|---|---|---|---|---|---|---|---|---|---|---|---|---|
| Dom Pedro | 2008 | Série C | 0 | 0 | 12 | 1 | — | | — | | — | | — | | 12 | 1 |
| Palmeiras | 2009 | Série A | 29 | 0 | 3 | 0 | — | | — | | 5 | 0 | — | | 37 | 0 |
| Palmeiras | 2010 | Série A | 2 | 0 | 4 | 0 | 3 | 0 | — | | — | | — | | 9 | 0 |
| Palmeiras | 2013 | Série B | 0 | 0 | 10 | 1 | — | | — | | 7 | 1 | — | | 17 | 2 |
| Palmeiras | Total | | 31 | 0 | 17 | 1 | 3 | 0 | — | | 12 | 1 | — | | 63 | 2 |
| Ponte Preta (loan) | 2010 | Série B | 28 | 4 | — | | — | | — | | — | | — | | 28 | 4 |
| São Caetano (loan) | 2011 | Série B | 33 | 5 | 16 | 0 | — | | — | | — | | — | | 49 | 5 |
| Náutico (loan) | 2012 | Série A | 35 | 7 | 18 | 7 | — | | — | | — | | — | | 53 | 14 |
| Cruzeiro(loan) | 2013 | Série A | 13 | 2 | 0 | 0 | 2 | 0 | — | | — | | — | | 15 | 2 |
| Cruzeiro | 2014 | Série A | 5 | 1 | 8 | 1 | — | | — | | 3 | 0 | — | | 16 | 2 |
| Santos (loan) | 2014 | Série A | 18 | 0 | — | | 1 | 0 | — | | — | | — | | 19 | 0 |
| Bahia (loan) | 2015 | Série B | 27 | 3 | 9 | 3 | 4 | 1 | — | | 2 (Note: All appearance(s) in Copa Sudamericana) | 0 | 8 (Note: Appearance(s) in Copa do Nordeste) | 3 | 50 | 10 |
| Cerezo Osaka (loan) | 2016 | J2 League | 41 | 8 | — | | 3 | 2 | — | | — | | — | | 44 | 10 |
| Cerezo Osaka | 2017 | J1 League | 33 | 4 | — | | 3 | 1 | 5 | 1 | — | | — | | 41 | 6 |
| Cerezo Osaka | 2018 | J1 League | 22 | 4 | — | | 2 | 0 | 2 | 1 | 3 (Note: All appearance(s) in AFC Champions League) | 0 | 1 (Note: All appearance(s) in Suruga Bank Championship) | 0 | 30 | 5 |
| Cerezo Osaka | 2019 | J1 League | 19 | 3 | — | | 2 | 1 | 3 | 2 | — | | — | | 24 | 6 |
| Cerezo Osaka | Total | | 74 | 11 | — | | 7 | 2 | 10 | 3 | 3 | 0 | 1 | 0 | 95 | 17 |
| Al-Ettifaq | 2019–20 | Saudi Pro League | 16 | 1 | — | | 0 | 0 | — | | — | | — | | 16 | 1 |
| Al-Ettifaq | 2020–21 | Saudi Pro League | 29 | 2 | — | | 1 | 0 | — | | — | | — | | 30 | 2 |
| Al-Ettifaq | 2021–22 | Saudi Pro League | 18 | 3 | — | | 1 | 0 | — | | — | | — | | 19 | 3 |
| Al-Ettifaq | Total | | 63 | 6 | — | | 2 | 0 | — | | — | | — | | 65 | 6 |
| Khor Fakkan | 2021–22 | UAE Pro League | 12 | 2 | — | | — | | — | | — | | — | | 12 | 2 |
| Náutico | 2022 | Série B | 17 | 1 | — | | — | | — | | — | | — | | 17 | 1 |
| Náutico | 2023 | Série C | 17 | 4 | 12 | 5 | 4 | 0 | — | | — | | 8 | 2 | 41 | 11 |
| Náutico | Total | | 34 | 5 | 12 | 5 | 4 | 0 | — | | — | | 8 | 2 | 58 | 12 |
| Ponte Preta (loan) | 2023 | Série B | 3 | 0 | — | | — | | — | | — | | — | | 3 | 0 |
| América de Natal | 2024 | Série D | 14 | 4 | 13 | 5 | 4 | 0 | — | | — | | 7 | 2 | 38 | 11 |
| América de Natal | 2025 | Série D | 20 | 3 | 11 | 5 | 1 | 0 | — | | — | | 3 | 0 | 35 | 8 |
| América de Natal | 2026 | Série D | 0 | 0 | 7 | 1 | 1 | 1 | — | | — | | — | | 8 | 2 |
| América de Natal | Total | | 34 | 7 | 31 | 11 | 6 | 1 | — | | — | | 10 | 2 | 81 | 21 |
| Career total | | | 451 | 61 | 123 | 29 | 32 | 6 | 10 | 4 | 20 | 1 | 27 | 7 | 663 | 98 |

== Honours ==
Cruzeiro

- Campeonato Brasileiro Série A: 2013

Cerezo Osaka

- J.League Cup: 2017
- Emperor's Cup: 2017

América de Natal

- Campeonato Potiguar: 2024
