= Tiago Real =

Brazilian footballer

Personal information
- Full name: Tiago Real do Prado
- Date of birth: 26 January 1989 (age 37)
- Place of birth: Curitiba, Brazil
- Height: 1.72 m (5 ft 8 in)
- Position: Central midfielder

Youth career
- 2005–2009: Coritiba

Senior career*
Years	Team	Apps	(Gls)
2009–2012	Coritiba	5	(0)
2009	→ Iguaçu (loan)		
2011–2012	→ Joinville (loan)	52	(4)
2012–2016	Palmeiras	28	(6)
2013	→ Náutico (loan)	29	(2)
2014	→ Goiás (loan)	45	(1)
2015	→ Bahia (loan)	60	(6)
2016	→ Vitória (loan)	36	(1)
2017	Coritiba	35	(1)
2018–2019	Ponte Preta	57	(0)
2019–2021	Al-Muharraq	4	(2)
2021	Vila Nova	19	(1)
2022	Chapecoense	16	(2)
2022–2023	Hajer	31	(6)
2023–2024	Al-Jubail		
- * Club domestic league appearances and goals as of 11 December 2021

Tiago Real do Prado (born 26 January 1989), known as Tiago Real, is a Brazilian footballer who plays as a central midfielder.

== Career ==
On 12 July 2022, Tiago Real joined Saudi Arabian club Hajer.

On 9 September 2023, Real joined Al-Jubail.

== Honours ==
Coritiba

- Campeonato Paranaense: 2010
- Campeonato Brasileiro Série B: 2010

Joinville

- Campeonato Brasileiro Série C: 2011
