= Márcio Araújo (footballer, born 1984) =

Brazilian footballer

Personal information
- Full name: Márcio Rodrigues Araújo
- Date of birth: 11 June 1984 (age 42)
- Place of birth: São Luís, Brazil
- Height: 1.72 m (5 ft 8 in)
- Position: Defensive midfielder

Youth career
- 2001–2002: Mogi Mirim

Senior career*
Years	Team	Apps	(Gls)
2003	Corinthians Alagoano	2	(0)
2003–2009	Atlético Mineiro	187	(10)
2005	→ Guarani (loan)	14	(0)
2007	→ Kashiwa Reysol (loan)	9	(0)
2010–2013	Palmeiras	248	(7)
2014–2017	Flamengo	209	(3)
2018–2019	Chapecoense	103	(1)
2020	CSA	14	(0)
2020–2021	Sport Recife	14	(0)
2021	Sampaio Corrêa	12	(0)
2022	IAPE		
- * Club domestic league appearances and goals as of 28 November 2021

Márcio Rodrigues Araújo (born 11 June 1984) is a Brazilian footballer who plays as a defensive midfielder. He previously played for big Brazilian clubs such as Flamengo, Palmeiras and Atlético Mineiro.

== Career ==
=== Flamengo ===
On 20 February 2014 Araujo completed his transfer to Flamengo. On 13 April 2014 he scored his first goal for his new club surrounded with much controversy, it was the title winning goal for the 2014 Rio State League on the injury time against Vasco da Gama, although he was clearly offside, and the referee bad call has been very criticised by Vasco da Gama.

On 4 May 2014 Araujo scored his first Série A goal in a match against his former club Palmeiras, Flamengo won 4–2.

On 28 December 2016 Araújo extended his contract with Flamengo for another year until December 2017.

== Career statistics ==
As of 29 November 2019.

Appearances and goals by club, season and competition
Club	Season	League			State League		Cup		Continental		Other		Total	
Club	Season	Division	Apps	Goals	Apps	Goals	Apps	Goals	Apps	Goals	Apps	Goals	Apps	Goals
Atlético Mineiro	2003	Série A	10	0	—		—		—		—		10	0
Atlético Mineiro	2004	Série A	26	0	3	0	0	0	1 (Note: Appearance(s) in Copa Sudamericana)	0	—		30	0
Atlético Mineiro	2005	Série A	0	0	1	0	0	0	—		—		1	0
Atlético Mineiro	2006	Série B	8	1	3	0	2	0	—		—		13	1
Atlético Mineiro	2007	Série A	0	0	2	0	—		—		—		2	0
Atlético Mineiro	2008	Série A	35	2	3	0	4	0	2	0	—		44	2
Atlético Mineiro	2009	Série A	26	2	13	1	2	0	—		—		41	3
Atlético Mineiro	Total		105	5	25	1	8	0	3	0	—		141	6
Guarani (loan)	2005	Série B	14	0	—		—		—		—		14	0
Kashiwa Reysol (loan)	2007	J League 1	5	0	—		—		—		4 (Note: Appearance(s) in J.League Cup)	0	9	0
Palmeiras	2010	Série A	33	2	16	0	7	0	8	0	—		64	2
Palmeiras	2011	Série A	35	0	20	1	7	0	1	0	—		63	1
Palmeiras	2012	Série A	28	1	19	0	10	0	3	0	—		60	1
Palmeiras	2013	Série B	35	0	16	3	2	0	8 (Note: Appearance(s) in Copa Libertadores)	0	—		61	3
Palmeiras	Total		131	3	71	4	26	0	20	0	—		248	7
Flamengo	2014	Série A	32	2	9	1	6	0	—		—		47	3
Flamengo	2015	Série A	33	0	16	0	7	0	—		—		56	0
Flamengo	2016	Série A	36	0	9	0	0	0	3	0	3 (Note: Appearance(s) in Primeira Liga)	0	51	0
Flamengo	2017	Série A	27	0	10	0	5	0	6	0	4	0	55	0
Flamengo	Total		128	2	44	1	18	0	9	0	7	0	209	3
Chapecoense	2018	Série A	30	0	12	0	4	0	2	2	—		48	0
Chapecoense	2019	Série A	33	0	11	1	6	0	2	0	—		52	1
Chapecoense	Total		63	0	33	1	10	0	2	0	—		100	1
Career total			446	10	173	7	62	0	34	0	11	0	721	17

== Honours ==
Atlético Mineiro

- Campeonato Brasileiro Série B: 2006
- Campeonato Mineiro: 2007

Palmeiras

- Copa do Brasil: 2012
- Campeonato Brasileiro Série B: 2013

Flamengo

- Campeonato Carioca: 2014, 2017
