= Vilson (footballer, born 1989) =

Brazilian footballer

Personal information
- Full name: Vilson Xavier de Menezes Júnior
- Date of birth: 3 April 1989 (age 37)
- Place of birth: São Gonçalo, Brazil
- Height: 1.89 m (6 ft 2 in)
- Positions: Defensive midfielder; centre back

Youth career
- 2004–2007: Madureira

Senior career*
Years	Team	Apps	(Gls)
2007–2009	Vasco da Gama	59	(1)
2009–2010	Vitória	3	(0)
2010–2013	Grêmio	44	(2)
2013	Palmeiras	16	(2)
2014	Cruzeiro	0	(0)
2014	Ponte Preta	0	(0)
2015–2016	SEV Hortolândia	0	(0)
2015	→ Chapecoense (loan)	24	(0)
2016	→ Corinthians (loan)	4	(0)
2016–2018	Corinthians	13	(1)
- * Club domestic league appearances and goals

Vilson Xavier de Menezes Júnior (born 3 April 1989), simply known as Vilson, is a Brazilian former footballer who played as a central defender.

== Statistics ==
As of match played 12 September 2016.

Club	Season	National League		National League		National Cup		Libertadores		Copa Sudamericana		State League		Friendly		Total	
Club	Season	App	Goals	App	Goals	App	Goals	App	Goals	App	Goals	App	Goals	App	Goals	App	Goals
Vasco	2007	20	1	0	0	0	0	0	0	3	0	0	0	0	0	23	1
Vasco	2008	9	0	0	0	0	0	0	0	2	0	0	0	0	0	11	0
Vasco	2009	0	0	30	0	0	0	0	0	0	0	0	0	0	0	30	0
Vitória	2010	3	0	0	0	0	0	0	0	0	0	0	0	0	0	3	0
Grêmio	2010	15	1	0	0	0	0	0	0	0	0	0	0	0	0	15	1
Grêmio	2011	12	0	0	0	0	0	2	0	0	0	8	1	0	0	22	1
Grêmio	2012	17	1	0	0	4	0	0	0	2	0	3	0	0	0	26	1
Palmeiras	2013	0	0	16	2	2	1	4	0	0	0	10	3	0	0	32	6
Chapecoense	2015	18	0	0	0	3	0	0	0	1	0	11	1	0	0	33	1
Corinthians	2016	6	1	0	0	0	0	1	0	0	0	4	0	1	0	12	1
Total		100	4	46	2	9	1	7	0	8	0	36	5	1	0	210	12

== Honours ==
Palmeiras

- Campeonato Brasileiro Série B: 2013

Corinthians

- Campeonato Brasileiro Série A: 2017
- Campeonato Paulista: 2017
