= Weldinho =

Brazilian footballer

Personal information
- Full name: Welder da Silva Marçal
- Date of birth: 16 January 1991 (age 35)
- Place of birth: Franca, Brazil
- Height: 1.80 m (5 ft 11 in)
- Position: Right back

Youth career
- Paulista

Senior career*
Years	Team	Apps	(Gls)
2010–2011	Paulista	0	(0)
2011–2013	Corinthians	35	(0)
2013–2017	Palmeiras	0	(0)
2013–2014	→ Sporting CP (loan)	0	(0)
2013–2014	→ Sporting CP B (loan)	8	(0)
2015	→ Oeste (loan)	3	(1)
2016–2017	→ Brasil de Pelotas (loan)	30	(1)
2017	Figueirense	4	(0)
- * Club domestic league appearances and goals as of 2 January 2018

Weldinho, full name Welder Silva de Oliveira (born 16 January 1991), is a Brazilian professional footballer known for his contributions as a right-back. He is recognized for his dominant right foot and has been assigned jersey number 2 throughout his career.

As of the latest available data, Weldinho's current transfer market value falls within the range of €80,000 to €100,000 (€0.1 million). Notably, his most recent transfer took place in 2017, when he moved from Palmeiras to Figueirense. It is worth mentioning that Figueirense acquired Weldinho on a free transfer, making it a cost-effective acquisition for the club. He last played for Figueirense.

== Career ==
He started his career in the youth ranks of Paulista Futebol Clube and in 2010, he won the Paulista Cup title. The Technical Committee of Timon Esporte Clube directly observed the defender in 37 starts. The main features of this right-back are his accuracy at junctions and his support at the bottom line. He was part of the Brazilian championship team in 2011.

== Career statistics ==
(Correct as of february 18, 2010)

Club	Season	League		State League		Copa do Brasil		Copa Libertadores		Copa Sudamericana		Friendly		Total	
Club	Season	Apps	Goals	Apps	Goals	Apps	Goals	Apps	Goals	Apps	Goals	Apps	Goals	Apps	Goals
Paulista	2010	0	0	2	0	0	0	0	0	0	0	0	0	2	0
Paulista	2011	0	0	16	1	0	0	0	0	0	0	0	0	16	1
Corinthians	2011	26	0	0	0	0	0	0	0	0	0	0	0	26	0
Corinthians	2012	9	0	9	1	0	0	2	0	0	0	2	0	21	1
Corinthians	2013	0	0	3	0	0	0	0	0	0	0	0	0	3	0
Total		35	0	30	2	0	0	2	0	0	0	2	0	68	2

== Honours ==
Corinthians

- Campeonato Brasileiro Série A: 2011
- Copa Libertadores: 2012
