= Piauí (footballer) =

Brazilian footballer

Edson Décimo Alves Araújo

Personal information
- Full name: Edson Décimo Alves Araújo
- Date of birth: 2 December 1986
- Place of birth: Floriano, Piauí, Brazil
- Date of death: 1 November 2014 (aged 27)
- Place of death: Floriano, Piauí, Brazil
- Height: 1.73 m (5 ft 8 in)
- Position: Left back

Youth career
- 2005–2007: Porto-PE

Senior career*
| Years | Team | Apps | (Gls) |
| 2007 | Santa Cruz | | |
| 2007–2008 | Atlético-PR | 3 | (0) |
- * Club domestic league appearances and goals

Edson Décimo Alves Araújo (2 December 1986 – 1 November 2014), known as Piauí, was a Brazilian footballer, who played as left back. He played for Atlético-PR, Porto-PE, Santa Cruz FC, Náutico, Salgueiro, ABC Futebol Clube, Mogi-Mirim, Oeste-SP and Boa Esporte Clube.

He was shot dead on 1 November 2014 in Floriano, Piauí.
