= Patrick Vieira (footballer, born 1992) =

Brazilian footballer

Personal information
- Full name: Patrick Martins Vieira
- Date of birth: 11 January 1992 (age 34)
- Place of birth: Rio de Janeiro, Brazil
- Height: 1.81 m (5 ft 11 in)
- Position: Attacking midfielder

Team information
- Current team: São Bento

Youth career
- 2005–2008: Botafogo
- 2009–2012: Palmeiras

Senior career*
Years	Team	Apps	(Gls)
2011–2014	Palmeiras	31	(4)
2013	→ Yokohama FC (loan)	8	(1)
2015	Náutico	20	(6)
2017	São Bernardo	7	(0)
2017–2018	Londrina	21	(1)
2019	Santa Cruz	8	(0)
2019–2020	Najran	9	(0)
2020–2021	Ismaily		
2021–	São Bento	4	(0)
- * Club domestic league appearances and goals as of 28 December 2021

Patrick Martins Vieira or simply Patrick Vieira (born 11 January 1992), is a Brazilian footballer who currently plays for São Bento as an attacking midfielder.

== Club career ==
He started his career playing for Botafogo and Palmeiras, before having a loan spell in Japan with Yokohama FC. He later returned to Brazil to play for Náutico, São Bernardo, Londrina and Santa Cruz. Later on, he transferred to Saudi club Najran, before joining Egyptian club Ismaily in October 2020.
