= João Denoni =

Brazilian footballer

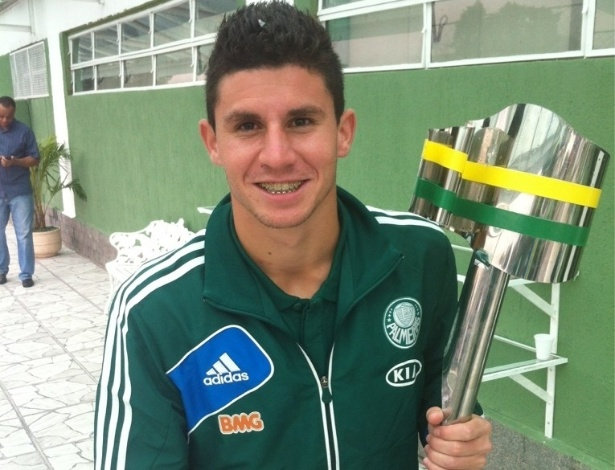

Personal information
- Full name: João Denoni Júnior
- Date of birth: February 2, 1994 (age 32)
- Place of birth: Taquaritinga, Brazil
- Height: 1.77 m (5 ft 10 in)
- Position: Midfielder

Team information
- Current team: Villa Nova

Youth career
- 2011–2012: Palmeiras

Senior career*
Years	Team	Apps	(Gls)
2012–2017	Palmeiras	13	(0)
2013–2014	→ Oeste (loan)	45	(3)
2015	→ Atlético Goianiense (loan)	3	(0)
2016	→ Ituano (loan)	0	(0)
2018–2019	Red Bull Brasil	0	(0)
2019–2020	Mirassol	0	(0)
2020	Vitória-ES	0	(0)
2021	Aimoré	0	(0)
2022	Maringá	0	(0)
2022	Manaus	0	(0)
2023	Maringá	0	(0)
2024	Operário Ferroviário	0	(0)
2025–	Villa Nova	0	(0)
- * Club domestic league appearances and goals as of 17:58, 2 July 2019 (UTC)

João Denoni Júnior or simply João Denoni (born February 2, 1994, in Taquaritinga) is a Brazilian football midfielder who plays for Villa Nova.

== Honours ==
Palmeiras

- Copa do Brasil: 2012
