= Luiz (footballer, born 1983) =

Brazilian footballer

Personal information
- Full name: Luiz Silva Filho
- Date of birth: 7 February 1983 (age 43)
- Place of birth: Campo Grande, Brazil
- Height: 1.89 m (6 ft 2 in)
- Position: Goalkeeper

Team information
- Current team: São Caetano

Youth career
- 1997–2002: Mirassol

Senior career*
Years	Team	Apps	(Gls)
2003	Mirassol	0	(0)
2003–2014	São Caetano	235	(0)
2014	→ Criciúma (loan)	15	(0)
2015–2019	Criciúma	232	(0)
2020	Mirassol	0	(0)
2020	Oeste	11	(0)
2021–2022	São Caetano	22	(0)
2023–	Grêmio Prudente	21	(0)
- * Club domestic league appearances and goals as of 23:28, 16 April 2023 (UTC)

Luiz Silva Filho (born 7 February 1983), known simply as Luiz, is a Brazilian professional footballer who plays as a goalkeeper for Grêmio Prudente.

In 2014, he went to Criciúma on loan from São Caetano.

In 2015, he signed a four-year contract with Criciúma.

Em 2023 Foi Contratado Pelo Grêmio Prudente.
