= Rodrigo Andrade (footballer, born 1988) =

Brazilian footballer

Personal information
- Full name: Rodrigo Andrade da Silva
- Date of birth: 5 February 1988 (age 38)
- Place of birth: Rio de Janeiro, Brazil
- Height: 1.77 m (5 ft 9 1/2 in)
- Position: Attacking midfielder

Team information
- Current team: URT
- Number: 10

Youth career
- 2007–2008: Flamengo

Senior career*
Years	Team	Apps	(Gls)
2007–2009	Flamengo	0	(0)
2008	→ Canoas (loan)	0	(0)
2009	→ America-RJ (loan)	34	(14)
2010–2011	Botafogo	6	(1)
2010	→ Atlético Goianiense (loan)	11	(0)
2011	→ America-RJ (loan)	3	(1)
2011	→ Ceará (loan)	2	(0)
2012	Londrina	5	(2)
2012–2013	XV de Piracicaba	16	(4)
2012	→ Portuguesa (loan)	7	(0)
2013	Figueirense	21	(0)
2014	Bragantino	3	(0)
2014	→ Brasiliense (loan)	9	(6)
2015	Botafogo-SP	15	(4)
2015	Criciúma	18	(2)
2016	Audax	9	(8)
2016	Chapecoense	6	(1)
2016	Fortaleza	17	(2)
2017–2018	Red Bull Brasil	9	(0)
2017	→ Paysandu (loan)	9	(0)
2018	Volta Redonda	13	(1)
2019	Portuguesa RJ	11	(1)
2019	Sampaio Corrêa	13	(4)
2020	Botafogo-PB	35	(6)
2020	América-RN	6	(0)
2021	Brasiliense	3	(0)
2021	Sampaio Corrêa	3	(0)
- * Club domestic league appearances and goals as of 21:41, 29 March 2020 (UTC)

Rodrigo Andrade da Silva (born 5 February 1988), known as Rodrigo Andrade, is a Brazilian footballer who plays as an attacking midfielder.

== Career ==
=== Flamengo and America ===
Diguinho was revealed by the Flamengo and then loaned to America to gain experience. The club alvirrubro dispute the Campeonato Carioca Second Division player and soon received opportunities.

For show enough mobility and eye for goal, the attacking midfielder proved a highlight of the team throughout the season. Over time, Diguinho was loved by the American crowd, especially when on 31 October, the player scored the only goal from a superb free kick on 33 minutes into the second half in a match against Olaria at Estádio do Maracanã secured the leadership for the team rubra.

=== Botafogo ===
After calling attention to 14 goals during the tournament and the fine performance in winning the Campeonato Carioca Second Division, the attacking midfielder, who was ending his contract with Flamengo, eventually striking a deal with Botafogo for the 2010 season.

=== Loan to Atlético Goianiense ===
In August, he was loaned to Atlético Goianiense until the end of the Campeonato Brasileiro Série A in 2010.

=== Loan to Ceará ===
On 14 June 2011, Diguinho moved to Ceará, signing a loan deal lasting until the end of the 2011 season.

=== Career statistics ===
(Correct as of 16 October 2010)

Club	Season	State League		Brazilian Série A		Copa do Brasil		Copa Libertadores		Copa Sudamericana		Total	
Club	Season	Apps	Goals	Apps	Goals	Apps	Goals	Apps	Goals	Apps	Goals	Apps	Goals
Flamengo	2009	-	-	-	-	-	-	-	-	-	-	0	0
America (loan)	2009	?	?	-	-	-	-	-	-	-	-	?	?
Botafogo	2010	5	1	1	0	-	-	-	-	-	-	6	1
Atlético Goianiense (loan)	2010	-	-	11	0	-	-	-	-	?	?	11	0
Ceará (loan)	2011	-	-	2	0	-	-	-	-	?	?	2	0
Total		?	?	14	0	-	-	-	-	?	?	?	?

== Honours ==
Botafogo

- Campeonato Carioca: 2010

== Contract ==
- Atlético Goianiense.
