= Andrey (footballer, born 1983) =

Brazilian footballer

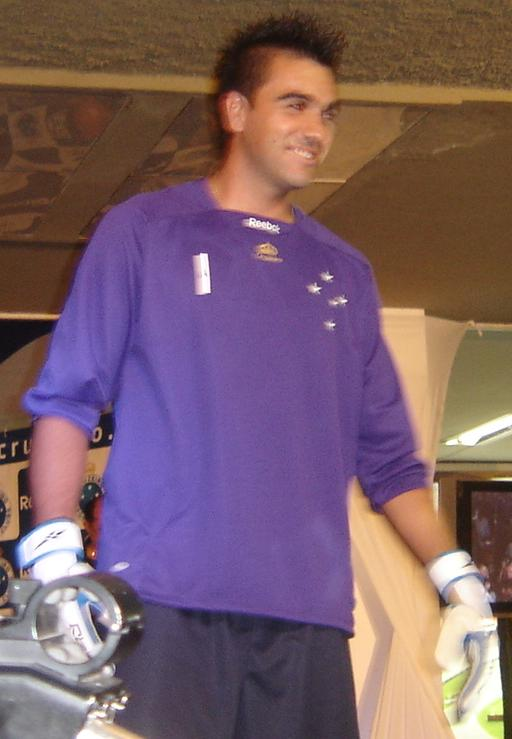
- Andrey Nazário Afonso (2009)

Personal information
- Full name: Andrey Nazário Afonso
- Date of birth: 9 November 1983 (age 43)
- Place of birth: Porto Alegre, Brazil
- Height: 1.95 m (6 ft 5 in)
- Position: Goalkeeper

Senior career*
| Years | Team | Apps | (Gls) |
| 2003–2005 | Grêmio | | |
| 2005 | Atlético Paranaense | | |
| 2005–2006 | Figueirense | 36 | (0) |
| 2007 | Steaua București | 6 | (0) |
| 2007 | Steaua II București | 2 | (0) |
| 2008–2009 | Cruzeiro | 8 | (0) |
| 2010 | Portuguesa | 8 | (0) |
| 2011–2012 | Criciúma | 34 | (0) |
| 2012–2013 | ABC | 36 | (0) |
| 2013–2015 | América-RN | 50 | (0) |
| 2015 | Boa | 21 | (0) |
| 2016 | Cruzeiro-RS | 13 | (0) |
| 2017 | Siahjamegan | 5 | (0) |
| 2017–2018 | Macaé | 4 | (0) |
| 2018 | Brasiliense | 0 | (0) |
| 2018 | Macaé | 8 | (0) |
| 2018 | Fluminense de Feira | 0 | (0) |
| 2019 | Avenida | 6 | (0) |
- * Club domestic league appearances and goals

Andrey Nazário Afonso (born 9 November 1983), known as just Andrey, is a Brazilian former football goalkeeper.

== Career ==
He made his debut with Steaua București on 1 March 2007, in the quarter-final cup match against Oţelul Galaţi, when Steaua București won 8–7 on penalties. He saved one penalty and was considered the man of the match. Just after a few weeks he was sent by chairman Gigi Becali at the second team, and then was released from team.

In 2008, recommended by new coach Adílson Batista, Andrey was signed by Brazilian side Cruzeiro.

== Honours ==
- FIFA U-20 World Cup: 2003
- Paraná State League: 2005
- Santa Catarina State League: 2006
