= Ayrton (footballer, born 1985) =

Brazilian footballer

Personal information
- Full name: Ayrton Luís Ganino
- Date of birth: 19 April 1985 (age 41)
- Place of birth: Piracicaba, Brazil
- Height: 1.75 m (5 ft 9 in)
- Position: Right-back

Team information
- Current team: CRB

Senior career*
Years	Team	Apps	(Gls)
2004–2005	Fabril	0	(0)
2005	Velo Clube	0	(0)
2006	Paraná	0	(0)
2006–2012	Iraty	6	(0)
2007	→ Jataiense (loan)	0	(0)
2007	→ Londrina (loan)	0	(0)
2008	→ Bahia (loan)	0	(0)
2008	→ Botafogo-SP (loan)	0	(0)
2010	→ Atlético Goianiense (loan)	4	(0)
2011	→ Americano (loan)	0	(0)
2012	→ Londrina (loan)	0	(0)
2012	→ Coritiba (loan)	19	(3)
2013–2016	Palmeiras	9	(0)
2013–2014	→ Vitória (loan)	38	(5)
2015	→ Flamengo (loan)	13	(1)
2016	Figueirense	0	(0)
2017	Paysandu	32	(2)
2018–	CRB	0	(0)
- * Club domestic league appearances and goals as of 1 March 2018

Ayrton Luís Ganino (born 19 April 1985), commonly known as Ayrton, is a Brazilian footballer who plays for CRB. He has previously played for 14 different clubs, most recently Palmeiras, Vitória and Flamengo.

== Career ==
Ayrton started his professional career with Fabril, signed a 5-year contract in June 2004. On 1 April 2005 he left for Velo Clube until the end of 2005 Campeonato Paulista Segunda Divisão. In January 2006 he was signed by Paraná Clube in 1-year contract, winning the league of Paraná state. He did not play for the team in 2006 Campeonato Brasileiro Série A.

In September 2006, he left for Iraty until the end of 2006 Paraná Cup, finished as the runner-up. In January 2007 he signed a new 1-year contract and in March left for Jataiense until the end of the league of Goiás state. After not playing in 2007 Paraná Cup, he left for fellow Paraná team Londrina in August, finished as the runner-up of the Paraná Cup.

He signed a new 3-year contract in January 2008 and left on 1 April for Bahia until the end of the league of Bahia state. On 1 July he was signed by Botafogo de Ribeirão Preto in 1-year deal but released after the end of 2008 Copa Paulista. He also left for Atlético Goianiense in April 2010 after extended his contract with Iraty until 2011. He returned to Iraty in August. Iraty was eliminated in the second stage (round of 20) of 2010 Série D.

In January 2011, he left for Americano until the end of the league of Rio de Janeiro state. On 20 November 2012, Ayrton was announced as new player of Palmeiras by president of club, Arnaldo Tirone, for 2013 season. Ayrton played 9 league matches for Palmeiras, his spell with the club included loan spells to Vitória and Flamengo. A total of 51 appearances and 6 goals in the league followed before he returned to his parent club. He departed Palmeiras in 2016 and subsequently joined Figueirense.

== Honours ==
Champion

- Campeonato Paranaense: 2006 (Paraná)
- Campeonato Paraense: 2017 (Paysandu)

Runner-up

- Copa do Brasil: 2012 (Coritiba)
- Campeonato Baiano: 2008 (Bahia)
- Copa Paraná: 2006 (Iraty), 2007 (Londrina)

== Career statistics ==
As of 10 March 2011

Club performance			League		Cup		League Cup		Total	
Season	Club	League	Apps	Goals	Apps	Goals	Apps	Goals	Apps	Goals
Brazil			League		Copa do Brasil		League Cup		Total	
2005	Velo Clube	Regional (SP 2)					?	?	?	?
2006	Paraná	Série A	0	0			?	?	?	?
2006	Iraty	Regional (PR)							7	0^{1}
2007	Iraty	Regional (PR)					12	1	12	1
2007	Jataiense	Regional (GO)					?	?	?	?
2007	Iraty	Regional (PR)							0	0^{2}
2007	Londrina	Regional (PR)							14	0^{2}
2008	Iraty	Regional (PR)					18	4	18	4
2008	Bahia	Série B	0	0			?	?	?	?
2008	Botafogo (SP)	Regional (SP A2)							10	0^{3}
2008	Iraty	Regional (PR)							6	1^{4}
2009	Iraty	Regional (PR)					15	4	15	4
2010	Iraty	Regional (PR)					18	3	18	3
2010	Atlético (GO)	Série A	4	0	2	0	note 5		6	0
2010	Iraty	Série D	6	0					6	0
2011	Americano	Regional (RJ)					5	0	5	0
Career total			10	0	2	0	?	?	?	?

- Note: State Leagues are marked as League Cup.

^{1} 7 games in 2006 Copa Paraná
^{2} 0 game and 14 games in 2007 Copa Paraná
^{3} 10 games in 2008 Copa Paulista
^{4} 6 games 1 goal in 2008 Copa Paraná
^{5} He is not eligible to 2010 Campeonato Goiano
