= Estádio Municipal Professor Dario Rodrigues Leite =

Soccer stadium in Guaratinguetá, Brazil

- Ninho da Garça
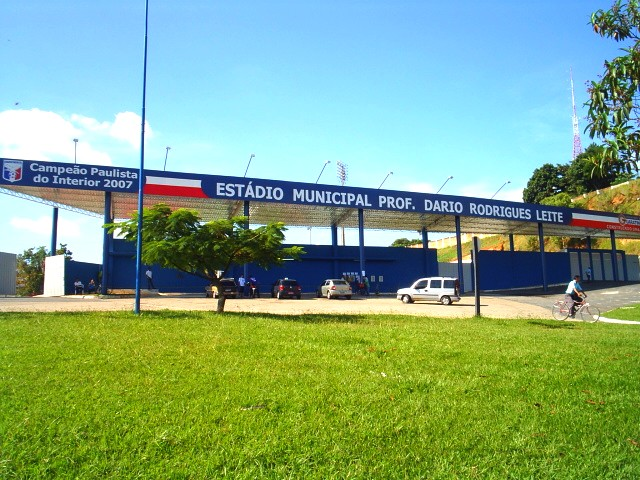
- Sisbrace
- Interactive map of Estádio Municipal Professor Dario Rodrigues Leite
- Full name: Estádio Municipal Professor Dario Rodrigues Leite
- Location: Guaratinguetá, São Paulo, Brazil
- Coordinates: 22.8072°S 45.1853°W
- Owner: Municipality of Guaratinguetá
- Capacity: 10,000
- Surface: Natural grass
- Field size: 105 by 68 metres (114.8 yd × 74.4 yd)

Construction
- Opened: September 7, 1965

Tenant
- Guaratinguetá Futebol

Estádio Municipal Professor Dario Rodrigues Leite, also known as Ninho da Garça, is a stadium in Guaratinguetá, Brazil. It has a capacity of 15,869 spectators. It is the home of Guaratinguetá Futebol.
