= Léo Gago =

Brazilian footballer

Personal information
- Full name: Leonardo David de Moura
- Date of birth: 17 February 1983 (age 43)
- Place of birth: Campinas, Brazil
- Height: 1.80 m (5 ft 11 in)
- Position: Defensive midfielder

Youth career
- 2000: Independente

Senior career*
| Years | Team | Apps | (Gls) |
| 2001 | Independente | | |
| 2002 | Internacional-SP | | |
| 2003 | Campinas | | |
| 2004 | Primavera | | |
| 2004 | Mineiros | | |
| 2005–2006 | Ceará | | |
| 2007 | Fortaleza | | |
| 2008 | Paraná | | |
| 2009 | Avaí | 30 | (6) |
| 2010 | Vasco da Gama | 6 | (1) |
| 2010 | → Coritiba (loan) | 19 | (7) |
| 2011 | Coritiba | 31 | (3) |
| 2012–2014 | Grêmio | 28 | (1) |
| 2013 | → Palmeiras (loan) | 13 | (1) |
| 2014 | → Bahia (loan) | 21 | (0) |
| 2015 | Bragantino | 13 | (0) |
| 2015–2016 | América FC | 4 | (0) |
| 2016 | Itumbiara | 13 | (2) |
| 2016 | Sampaio Corrêa | 10 | (1) |
| 2017–2019 | Cianorte | 13 | (1) |
| 2019 | Guarani de Palhoça | | |
- * Club domestic league appearances and goals

Leonardo David de Moura (born 17 February 1983), commonly known as Léo Gago, is a Brazilian former professional footballer who played as a defensive midfielder.
