= Flávio Boaventura =

Brazilian footballer (born 1987)

Personal information
- Full name: Flavio de Souza Boaventura
- Date of birth: 12 July 1987 (age 39)
- Place of birth: Feira de Santana, Brazil
- Height: 1.83 m (6 ft 0 in)
- Position: Centre-back

Team information
- Current team: Portuguesa

Youth career
- Grêmio Prudente

Senior career*
Years	Team	Apps	(Gls)
2007–2008	Joinville		
2008	→ Marília (loan)		
2009–2010	Marília		
2009	→ Vila Nova (loan)	9	(1)
2010	Grêmio Prudente	9	(0)
2011	Atlético Paranaense	3	(0)
2011	Paraná	11	(0)
2012–2014	ABC	54	(0)
2014–2015	Paços Ferreira	15	(1)
2015–2016	América-RN	35	(5)
2016–2018	CRB	91	(9)
2019	Grêmio Novorizontino	10	(0)
2019	Army United	16	(2)
2020	São Bento	11	(0)
2020	Sampaio Corrêa	12	(2)
2021	América-RN	11	(1)
2022	Goiatuba	2	(0)
2022–	Portuguesa	7	(1)
- * Club domestic league appearances and goals as of 20:36, 26 September 2022 (UTC)

Flávio de Souza Boaventura (born 12 July 1987) commonly known as Flávio Boaventura is a Brazilian footballer who plays as a centre-back for Portuguesa.

== Career ==
On 11 December 2018, Boaventura joined Campeonato Paulista side Grêmio Novorizontino.
