= 2013 Campeonato Brasileiro Série B =

Campeonato Brasileiro Série B
- Season: 2013
- Champions: Palmeiras
- Promoted: Palmeiras; Chapecoense; Sport; Figueirense
- Relegated: Guaratinguetá; Paysandu; São Caetano; ASA
- Matches: 380
- Goals: 998 (2.63 per match)
- Top goalscorer: Bruno Rangel (31 goals)
- Biggest home win: América-MG 5−0 Sport
- Biggest away win: Boa Esporte 0−4 Oeste; Avaí 0−4 Figueirense
- Highest scoring: Chapecoense 6−2 São Caetano; Ceará 5−3 Bragantino
- Highest attendance: 48,960; Ceará 2–2 Palmeiras (31 August 2013)
- Lowest attendance: 47; América-RN 2–2 Oeste (30 November 2013)

The Serie B of the Brazilian Championship 2013 was a football competition held in Brazil, equivalent to the second division. It is contested by 20 clubs, between May 24 and November 30. The top four teams will have access to Série A in 2014 and the last four will be relegated to Série C in 2014.

The games had a break during the 2013 FIFA Confederations Cup, which was held between June and July in Brazil. The competition was played for six rounds before the stoppage.

== Teams ==
=== Stadia and locations ===
Locations of the 2013 Série B teams.

Team	Home city	Stadium	Capacity	2012 season
ABC	Natal	Frasqueirão	15,082	12th in Série B
América de Natal	Natal	Nazarenão	5,200	9th in Série B
América Mineiro	Belo Horizonte	Independência	23,000	8th in Série B
ASA	Arapiraca	Coaracy da Mata Fonseca	15,000	13th in Série B
Atlético Goianiense	Goiânia	Serra Dourada	41,574	19th in Série A
Avaí	Florianópolis	Ressacada	17,537	7th in Série B
Boa Esporte	Varginha	Melão	15,471	15th in Série B
Bragantino	Bragança Paulista	Nabi Abi Chedid	17,022	14th in Série B
Ceará	Fortaleza	Castelão	67,037	11th in Série B
Chapecoense	Chapecó	Arena Condá	15,000	3rd in Série C
Figueirense	Florianópolis	Orlando Scarpelli	19,509	20th in Série A
Guaratinguetá	Guaratinguetá	Ninho da Garça	16,095	16th in Série B
Icasa	Juazeiro do Norte	Romeirão	16,000	2nd in Série C
Joinville	Joinville	Arena Joinville	22,400	6th in Série B
Oeste	Itápolis	Amaros	13,044	1st in Série C
Palmeiras	São Paulo	Pacaembu	42,730	18th in Série A
Paraná	Curitiba	Vila Capanema	20,083	10th in Série B
Paysandu	Belém	Curuzú	16,200	4th in Série C
São Caetano	São Caetano do Sul	Anacleto Campanella	16,744	5th in Série B
Sport	Recife	Ilha do Retiro	35,000	17th in Série A

=== Personnel and kits ===
Team	Manager	Captain	Kit manufacturer	Shirt sponsor
ABC	(Brazil) Roberto Fernandes	(Brazil) Daniel Paulista	Lupo	EMS
América (MG)	(Brazil) Paulo Silas	(Brazil) Fábio Júnior	Lupo	
América (RN)	(Brazil) Pintado	(Brazil) Andrey	ERK	Cavaleiros do Forró
ASA	(Brazil) Leandro Campos	(Brazil) Gilson	Tronadon	Caixa
Atlético Goianiense	(Brazil) Paulo César Gusmão	(Brazil) Márcio	Super Bolla	Caixa
Avaí	(Brazil) Hemerson Maria	(Brazil) Marquinhos	Fanatic	Caixa
Boa	(Brazil) Nedo Xavier	(Brazil) Marcelinho	Kanxa	
Bragantino	(Brazil) Marcelo Veiga	(Brazil) Álvaro	Kanxa	
Ceará	(Brazil) Sérgio Soares	(Brazil) Fernando Henrique	Penalty	Galvão Engenharia
Chapecoense	(Brazil) Gilmar Dal Pozzo	(Brazil) Wanderson	Umbro	Aurora
Figueirense	(Brazil) Vinícius Eutrópio	(Brazil) Wellington Saci	Penalty	Caixa
Guaratinguetá	(Brazil) Toninho Cecílio	(Brazil) Wendel	Nakal	
Icasa	(Brazil) Sidney Moraes	(Brazil) Radamés	Siker	New Magic Jeans
Joinville	(Brazil) Ricardo Drubscky	(Brazil) Marcelo Costa	Spieler Sports	Red Horse
Oeste	(Brazil) Ivan Baitello	(Brazil) Dezinho	Kanxa	
Palmeiras	(Brazil) Gilson Kleina	(Brazil) Henrique	Adidas	
Paraná	(Brazil) Dado Cavalcanti	(Brazil) Lúcio Flávio	Kanxa	
Paysandu	(Brazil) Vágner Benazzi	(Brazil) Vanderson	Puma	Reinalab
São Caetano	(Brazil) Sérgio Guedes	(Brazil) Luiz	Lupo	Universo Tintas
Sport	(Brazil) Geninho	(Brazil) Magrão	Lotto	

== League table ==
Pos	Team	Pld	W	D	L	GF	GA	GD	Pts	Promotion or relegation
1	Palmeiras (C, P)	38	24	7	7	71	28	+43	79	Promotion to 2014 Série A
2	Chapecoense (P)	38	20	12	6	60	31	+29	72	Promotion to 2014 Série A
3	Sport (P)	38	20	3	15	64	56	+8	63	Promotion to 2014 Série A
4	Figueirense (P)	38	18	6	14	63	52	+11	60	Promotion to 2014 Série A
5	Icasa	38	18	5	15	50	54	−4	59	
6	Joinville	38	17	8	13	58	44	+14	59	
7	Ceará	38	16	11	11	60	50	+10	59	
8	Paraná	38	16	9	13	55	39	+16	57	
9	América-MG	38	14	15	9	51	42	+9	57	
10	Avaí	38	16	8	14	49	46	+3	56	
11	Boa Esporte	38	13	11	14	33	46	−13	50	
12	Bragantino	38	13	8	17	37	43	−6	47	
13	América-RN	38	11	14	13	48	56	−8	47	
14	ABC	38	13	7	18	45	58	−13	46	
15	Oeste	38	11	13	14	44	58	−14	46	
16	Atlético Goianiense	38	12	8	18	42	51	−9	44	
17	Guaratinguetá (R)	38	11	8	19	42	54	−12	41	Relegation to 2014 Série C
18	Paysandu (R)	38	10	10	18	40	56	−16	40	Relegation to 2014 Série C
19	São Caetano (R)	38	9	9	20	45	59	−14	36	Relegation to 2014 Série C
20	ASA (R)	38	11	2	25	41	75	−34	35	Relegation to 2014 Série C

Updated to match(es) played on unknown. Source: Soccerway.com
Rules for classification: 1st points; 2nd wins; 3rd goal difference; 4th goals scored; 5th head-to-head results; 6th least red cards received; 7th least yellow cards received; 8th draw.
(C) Champions; (P) Promoted; (R) Relegated

== Results ==
Home \ Away	ABC	AMG	ARN	ASA	ACG	AVA	BOA	BRG	CEA	CHA	FIG	GTG	ICA	JEC	OES	PAL	PAR	PAY	SCA	SPT
ABC		2–1	3–3	4–1	0–1	1–0	3–1	1–1	1–1	2–0	3–2	2–4	1–0	0–0	0–0	3–2	0–2	3–0	2–0	4–2
América-MG	0–0		1–1	1–0	3–0	0–0	0–0	2–2	2–2	1–1	2–4	1–0	1–2	0–2	4–3	1–1	2–2	0–1	2–1	5–0
América-RN	0–0	2–2		2–0	2–1	2–3	0–0	0–2	1–0	0–1	2–0	2–2	1–1	1–1	2–2	0–2	4–1	3–0	2–1	2–4
ASA	4–0	2–0	1–2		0–1	1–0	0–1	2–1	2–3	0–2	3–1	2–1	3–1	0–1	3–0	0–3	1–4	1–1	1–0	2–4
Atlético Goianiense	0–1	1–1	0–1	5–1		2–1	3–1	0–1	1–3	0–0	2–3	2–0	0–3	2–1	4–0	1–3	0–2	1–0	1–1	2–1
Avaí	2–0	1–2	0–1	2–0	1–0		1–0	3–0	1–1	1–2	0–4	2–1	3–1	0–2	2–2	2–4	2–2	2–0	2–1	1–0
Boa Esporte	1–0	1–1	3–2	1–2	0–0	0–0		0–0	1–2	1–4	0–2	2–0	1–0	1–0	0–4	1–0	3–2	1–0	1–0	2–3
Bragantino	2–1	0–1	0–1	2–0	2–0	1–1	0–1		2–0	1–0	1–1	2–0	1–2	1–2	2–0	0–2	0–0	0–0	1–0	1–2
Ceará	4–0	1–1	2–1	4–1	0–1	2–1	2–2	5–3		3–1	1–1	2–0	1–0	0–3	1–0	2–2	1–1	1–0	4–2	4–1
Chapecoense	5–1	2–0	0–0	4–0	3–0	3–1	1–0	1–1	1–1		1–1	1–0	1–2	2–1	1–1	1–0	2–2	3–2	6–2	0–0
Figueirense	2–0	1–2	3–2	2–0	1–1	1–3	3–0	2–1	2–1	0–2		2–1	3–0	0–1	3–0	2–3	1–0	3–2	3–1	3–2
Guaratinguetá	3–1	1–0	2–0	2–1	2–0	1–0	0–0	1–0	0–1	0–0	1–1		3–0	1–3	0–0	1–1	3–4	1–1	3–2	1–4
Icasa	2–1	1–2	1–1	5–2	0–0	3–4	1–0	4–1	1–0	1–2	1–0	3–2		2–1	0–3	1–0	0–3	2–1	3–2	2–1
Joinville	1–2	2–1	3–1	2–0	2–1	1–2	2–3	3–0	1–1	2–2	3–1	1–1	0–0		1–1	0–1	1–0	4–2	1–0	2–3
Oeste	2–1	1–1	4–1	1–2	2–4	1–1	0–0	2–0	2–1	1–0	2–2	1–0	0–0	0–2		0–2	1–0	1–0	0–3	0–3
Palmeiras	4–1	0–1	0–0	3–0	1–0	2–1	3–0	2–1	4–1	0–0	4–0	1–0	4–0	3–0	4–0		2–1	3–2	0–0	2–1
Paraná	1–0	0–1	4–0	1–0	1–1	0–1	3–1	1–0	3–0	0–1	1–0	4–0	2–0	1–1	1–2	1–1		3–1	0–0	1–0
Paysandu	1–0	0–2	1–1	1–1	0–0	0–2	0–0	0–1	2–1	2–1	2–1	4–3	1–2	2–1	3–3	1–0	2–0		2–2	2–0
São Caetano	2–1	1–1	2–2	3–0	4–2	0–0	0–1	0–1	0–0	0–1	0–2	0–1	2–1	3–2	2–2	1–2	2–1	3–1		2–1
Sport	1–0	1–3	3–0	4–2	3–2	2–0	2–2	0–2	2–1	1–2	1–0	1–0	0–2	3–2	2–0	1–0	2–0	0–0	3–0	

Updated to match(es) played on 21 September 2013. Source: CBF
Legend: Blue = home team win; Yellow = draw; Red = away team win.
