= 2014 SE Palmeiras season =

Palmeiras
2014 season
- President: Paulo Nobre
- Coach: Gilson Kleina (Until May 8); Alberto Valentim (May 8–July 1) (Interim); Ricardo Gareca (After the World Cup–September 1); Alberto Valentim (September 1–September 4) (Interim); Dorival Júnior (September 3–December 8)
- Stadium: Pacaembu; Allianz Parque
- Série A: 16th
- Campeonato Paulista: Semifinal
- Copa do Brasil: Round of 16
- Top goalscorer: League: Henrique (16 goals); All: Henrique (18 goals)
- Highest home attendance: 35,939 (vs. Sport – November 19)
- Lowest home attendance: 4,897 (vs. Vilhena – April 2)
Home colors	Away colors	Third colors

The 2014 season was the 100th in Sociedade Esportiva Palmeiras existence. This season marked the Palmeiras return to the top flight of Brazilian football after being promoted from 2013 Campeonato Brasileiro Série B. Palmeiras also competed in the state league, Campeonato Paulista, and Copa do Brasil.

== Key events ==
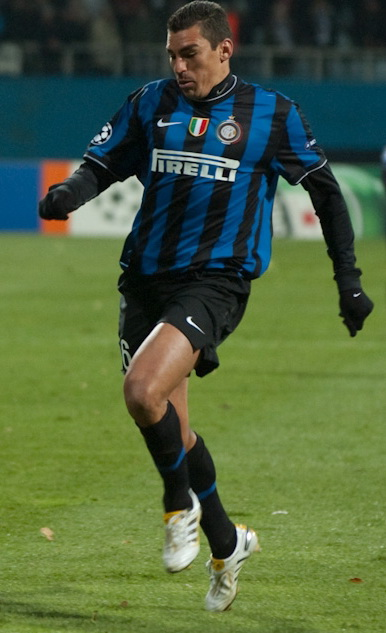
Defender Lúcio joined Palmeiras from São Paulo FC.

- November 26, 2013: After some speculation, coach Gilson Kleina's contract was renewed for one more year.
- December 14, 2013: First sign for the 2014 season, the forward Rodolfo, age 20, scored 24 goals in 27 matches for the Rio Claro in the 2013 U-20 Campeonato Paulista.
- December 30, 2013: The second sign for the 2014 season, is the midfielder França coming from loan from the German team Hannover 96.
- January 9, 2014: The 2002 FIFA World Cup winner with Brazil the defender Lúcio signed with Palmeiras for 2 years. At the same day Palmeiras announced other defender, the Uruguayan Mauricio Victorino who defended Uruguay in the 2010 FIFA World Cup.
- January 24, 2014: The midfielder Bruno César signs a loan from Saudi side Al-Ahli until December 2014.
- February 21, 2014: Valdivia is called up by Jorge Sampaoli the Chile national football team coach for the friendly against Germany on March 5. Chile lost match, 1–0 on a goal scored by Mario Götze. Valdivia played the last 15 minutes of the match.
- March 6, 2014: After beating Portuguesa by 1–0, Palmeiras is the first team to reach the Campeonato Paulista Quarterfinals.
- March 23, 2014: Palmeiras finishes Campeonato Paulista first phase with a 2–1 loss for Santos. With this, Palmeiras has the second best campaign overall.
- April 14, 2014: After the end of the Campeonato Paulista, three Palmeiras players were awarded: Alan Kardec best forward, Lúcio best defender and Fernando Prass best goalkeeper.
- April 28, 2014: In an interview the Palmeiras President Paulo Nobre said the team top goalscorer at that moment Alan Kardec is leaving Palmeiras for rivals São Paulo. The team and Kardec had problems with negotiation to renew his contract and the São Paulo offered more money for the player.
- May 8, 2014: The head coach Gilson Kleina was sacked after the loss to Sampaio Corrêa and the sequence of bad results.
- May 21, 2014: After some negotiations, Palmeiras announced the Argentinean Ricardo Gareca as a new coach. Gareca is the sixth Argentinean coach in the Palmeiras history.
- July 15, 2014: One of the latest Palmeiras idols Jorge Valdivia is leaving the team, the destination of the Chilean is the Fujairah SC from United Arab Emirates. But after some disagreements the transfers was canceled. Valdivia said the reason for the transfer be canceled because the team owners said "it was a lot of money, and this could be used to build hospitals and schools".
- September 1, 2014: After only three months, head coach Ricardo Gareca was sacked after a bad sequence of results. Gareca's record was four wins, one draw and eight losses. Alberto Valentim assumed the team, as an interim coach.
- September 3, 2014: Dorival Júnior signed as a new head coach.
- November 6, 2014: CBF confirmed that Palmeiras's first match in Allianz Parque would be against Sport on November 19. The stadium was under construction since 2010.
- December 8, 2014: Dorival Júnior was fired at the end of the season.

== Players ==
=== Squad information ===
As of October 4, 2014.

Note: Flags indicate national team as defined under FIFA eligibility rules; some limited exceptions apply. Players may hold more than one non-FIFA nationality.

No.	Pos.	Nation	Player
1	GK	BRA	Bruno
2	DF	ARG	Fernando Tobio
3	DF	BRA	Lúcio
5	MF	URU	Sebastián Eguren
6	DF	BRA	Juninho
8	MF	PAR	William Mendieta
9	FW	ARG	Jonathan Cristaldo
10	MF	CHI	Jorge Valdivia
11	MF	BRA	Wesley
13	DF	BRA	Wendel
14	FW	ARG	Pablo Mouche
17	FW	BRA	Diogo
18	MF	BRA	Felipe Menezes
19	FW	BRA	Henrique
20	MF	ARG	Agustín Allione
21	MF	BRA	Patrick Vieira
22	GK	BRA	Deola
23	MF	BRA	Renato
25	GK	BRA	Fernando Prass
26	DF	BRA	Marcelo Oliveira (on loan from Cruzeiro)
27	FW	BRA	Mazinho

No.	Pos.	Nation	Player
28	DF	URU	Mauricio Victorino (on loan from Cruzeiro)
29	FW	BRA	Rodolfo
30	MF	BRA	Bruno César (on loan from Al-Ahli)
31	MF	BRA	Bernardo (on loan from Vasco da Gama)
32	DF	BRA	Weldinho
33	MF	BRA	Washington (on loan from Penapolense)
34	DF	BRA	Wellington
35	DF	BRA	Victor Luis
36	GK	BRA	Jailson
37	MF	BRA	Bruninho
38	FW	BRA	Leandro
41	DF	BRA	Thiago Martins
43	DF	BRA	Gabriel Dias
44	DF	BRA	Léo Cunha
45	FW	BRA	Érik
47	GK	BRA	Fábio
48	GK	BRA	Vinicius
49	MF	BRA	Juninho
53	DF	BRA	Nathan
54	DF	BRA	João Pedro

== Competitions ==
=== Overview ===
Competition	First match	Last match	Starting round	Final position	Record							
Competition	First match	Last match	Starting round	Final position	Pld	W	D	L	GF	GA	GD	Win %
Série A	9 May 2014	6 December 2014	Matchday 1	16th	38	11	7	20	34	59	−25	28.95
Copa do Brasil	12 March 2014	4 September 2014	First round	Round of 16	8	5	0	3	10	5	+5	62.50
Campeonato Paulista	18 January 2014	30 March 2014	Matchday 1	Semi-Finals	17	12	2	3	29	14	+15	70.59
Total					63	28	9	26	73	78	−5	44.44

Source: Competitions

== Friendlies ==
=== Pre-season ===
January 11	Palmeiras	0–2	Red Bull Brasil	Itu
		Report	(?) (?)	Stadium: Spa Sport

January 15	Palmeiras	4–1	União Barbarense	Itu
17:00 (UTC–2)	Tiago Alves 17'; Diogo 41'; Alan Kardec 61'; Felipe Menezes (?)	Report	? (?)	Stadium: Spa Sport

=== Copa EuroAmericana ===
The Copa EuroAmericana is a friendly tournament created by DirecTV that take place in South America and North America on 20 July – 2 August 2014. Thirteen teams from CONMEBOL, CONCACAF and UEFA participate in it. Palmeiras will play only one match in the tournament.

July 30	Palmeiras (Brazil)	2–1	(Italy) Fiorentina	São Paulo
21:50 (UTC–3)	Victor Luis 13'; Leandro 35'	Report	Pasqual (yellow card) 31'; Rossi 72'; Pizarro (yellow card) 90'	Stadium: Pacaembu; Attendance: 20,285; Referee: Raphael Claus (São Paulo)

== Campeonato Paulista ==
=== Standings ===
Pos	Team	Pld	W	D	L	GF	GA	GD	Pts
1	Palmeiras	15	11	2	2	27	13	+14	35
2	Bragantino	15	7	2	6	17	18	−1	23
3	Rio Claro	15	5	5	5	29	27	+2	20
4	Mogi Mirim	15	4	5	6	25	30	−5	17
5	Oeste	15	3	2	10	16	28	−12	11

=== First stage ===
In the first stage, the teams played in a group with all of the clubs of other groups in a single round, qualifying for the quarter-final the 2 teams with the most points won this stage in each of the groups.

Win Draw Loss

January 18 1	Palmeiras	2–1	Linense	São Paulo
17:00 (UTC–2)	Renato (yellow card) 22'; Mazinho 58'; Alan Kardec 67'	Report	Anselmo 35'; Tobi (yellow card) 45+1'; Alex Moraes (yellow card) 57'; Thiago Santos (yellow card) 86'; Marcelo (yellow card) 87'	Stadium: Pacaembu; Attendance: 10,717; Referee: Leandro Bizzio Marinho

January 23 2	Comercial	0–2	Palmeiras	Ribeirão Preto
21:00 (UTC–2)	Marcus Winícius (yellow card) 58'	Report	Juninho 13'; Wesley 37'	Stadium: Palma Travassos; Attendance: 8,815; Referee: Welton Orlando Wohnrath

January 26 3	Atlético Sorocaba	1–4	Palmeiras	Sorocaba
17:00 (UTC–2)	Ewerthon 13'; Kasado (yellow card) 23'; Montoya (yellow card) 33'; Fabão (yellow card) 54'; Boquita (yellow card) 83'	Report	Valdivia 21', (yellow card) 54'; Marcelo Oliveira (yellow card) 45+2'; Leandro 66'; Juninho 75'; Wesley 90+2'	Stadium: Walter Ribeiro; Attendance: 11,218; Referee: Cássio Luiz Zancopé

January 30 4	Palmeiras	1–0	Penapolense	São Paulo
19:30 (UTC–2)	Juninho (yellow card) 9'; Leandro (yellow card) 11'; Wendel (yellow card) 42'; Marquinhos Gabriel 65'; Serginho (yellow card) 83'	Report	Heleno (yellow card) 3' (yellow-red card) 41'; Gualberto (yellow card) 19'; Rodrigo Biro (yellow card) 52'	Stadium: Pacaembu; Attendance: 12,380; Referee: Flávio Rodrigues da Souza

February 2 5	Palmeiras	2–0	São Paulo	São Paulo
17:00 (UTC–2)	Valdivia 23'; Leandro (yellow card) 55'; Alan Kardec 78' (pen.)	Report	Rodrigo Caio (yellow card) 57'; Luís Fabiano (yellow card) 62'; Álvaro Pereira (yellow card) 76'	Stadium: Pacaembu; Attendance: 23,694; Referee: Luiz Flávio de Oliveira

February 5 6	XV de Piracicaba	1–2	Palmeiras	Piracicaba
22:00 (UTC–2)	Jonathan Cafu 32'; Danilinho (yellow card) 67'; Macena (yellow card) 76'	Report	Alan Kardec 14' (pen.); Wellington (yellow card) 73'; Lúcio (yellow card) 76'; França 84', (yellow card) 84'; Juninho (yellow card) 87'	Stadium: Barão da Serra Negra; Attendance: 11,042; Referee: Vinicius Furlan

February 9 7	Palmeiras	1–1	Audax	São Paulo
17:00 (UTC–2)	Wellington (yellow card) 44'; Mendieta 78'	Report	Caion (yellow card) 44'; Denilson 52'; Camacho (yellow card) 66'; Carlos Magno (yellow card) 75'	Stadium: Pacaembu; Attendance: 14,281; Referee: Rodrigo Guarizo Ferreira do Amaral

February 16 8	Corinthians	1–1	Palmeiras	São Paulo
16:00 (UTC–3)	Jádson (yellow card) 12'; Romarinho 60'; Guilherme (yellow card) 74'; Guerrero (yellow card) 90+1'	Report	Valdivia (yellow card) 16'; Leandro (yellow card) 58'; Alan Kardec 82'; Lúcio (yellow card) 85'; Mendieta (yellow card) 89'	Stadium: Pacaembu; Attendance: 23,317; Referee: Raphael Claus

February 19 9	Palmeiras	1–0	Ituano	São Paulo
22:00 (UTC–3)	França (yellow card) 58'; Alan Kardec 87', (red card) 90'	Report	Josa (yellow card) 8'; Dener (yellow card) 58' (yellow-red card) 78'; Dick (yellow card) 66'; Jackson Caucaia (red card) 90'	Stadium: Pacaembu; Attendance: 6,947; Referee: Wilson Seneme

February 23 10	Botafogo–SP	3–1	Palmeiras	Ribeirão Preto
18:30 (UTC–3)	Mike 20'; Camilo 33'; Marcelo Macedo 38' (pen.); Gilvan (yellow card) 62'; Alex Silva (yellow card) 81' (yellow-red card) 86'	Report	Valdivia 24' (pen.), (yellow card) 81'; William Matheus (yellow card) 37'; Bruno César (red card) 74'; França (yellow card) 90+2'	Stadium: Santa Cruz; Attendance: 16,373; Referee: Robério Pereira Pires

February 27 11	Palmeiras	2–0	São Bernardo	São Paulo
19:30 (UTC–3)	Alan Kardec 24'; Valdivia 55', (yellow card) 85'	Report	Luciano Castán (yellow card) 31'	Stadium: Pacaembu; Attendance: 6,742; Referee: Aurélio Santanna Martins

March 6 12	Palmeiras	1–0	Portuguesa	São Paulo
19:30 (UTC–3)	Eguren (yellow card) 13'; Juninho 48', (yellow card) 88'; Lúcio (yellow card) 56'	Report	Henrique (yellow card) 50'; Rondinelly (yellow card) 55'; Willian Magrão (yellow card) 60'; Renan (yellow card) 66'	Stadium: Pacaembu; Attendance: 9,984; Referee: Vinicius Furlan

March 9 13	Paulista	1–3	Palmeiras	São José do Rio Preto
18:30 (UTC–3)	David 26' (pen.); Victor Hugo (yellow card) 45' (yellow-red card) 52'	Report	William Matheus 20'; Marcelo Oliveira (yellow card) 25' (yellow-red card) 57'; França (yellow card) 44'; Mendieta (yellow card) 45'; Miguel (yellow card) 66', (goal) 66'; Patrick Vieira 86'	Stadium: Teixeirão; Attendance: 16,158; Referee: Marcelo Aparecido de Souza

March 15 14	Palmeiras	3–2	Ponte Preta	São Paulo
16:00 (UTC–3)	Wendel (yellow card) 16'; Eguren 60'; Alan Kardec 62' (pen.); Mendieta 87'	Report	Rossi 2'; Bruno Silva (yellow card) 11'; Adrianinho (yellow card) 32'; Diego Sacoman (yellow card) 37'; Silvinho 70' (pen.); Thiago Carleto (yellow card) 74'; Alef (yellow card) 74'	Stadium: Pacaembu; Attendance: 11,883; Referee: Marcelo Rogério

March 23 15	Santos	2–1	Palmeiras	Santos
16:00 (UTC–3)	Neto 24', (yellow card) 90+3'; Thiago Ribeiro 35', (yellow card) 90+4'; Gabriel (yellow card) 53'; Alison (yellow card) 56'; Bruno Peres (yellow card) 67'	Report	Valdivia (yellow card) 23'; Eguren (yellow card) 73'; Alan Kardec 87'	Stadium: Vila Belmiro; Attendance: 12,179; Referee: Luiz Flávio de Oliveira

Source: Soccerway.com

=== Quarterfinals ===
Each tie, apart from the final was played over two legs, and the team with the best campaign playing the second leg at home. The quarterfinals was played between the winners and runners-up of each group. In the semifinals the best team (first) faced the team with the worst campaign (fourth), while the second faced the team with the third best campaign.

March 27 Quarterfinals	Palmeiras	2–0	Bragantino	São Paulo
21:00 (UTC–3)	Alan Kardec 21'; Bruno César (yellow card) 23'; Marcelo Oliveira (yellow card) 34'; Valdivia (yellow card) 48'; Wesley 62'	Report	Francesco (yellow card) 17'; Geandro (yellow card) 66'	Stadium: Pacaembu; Attendance: 25,714; Referee: Flávio Rodrigues Guerra

=== Semifinal ===
March 30 Semifinal	Palmeiras	0–1	Ituano	São Paulo
18:30 (UTC–3)	Vinícius (yellow card) 56'; Valdivia (yellow card) 76'; Tiago Alves (yellow card) 79'; Wellington (yellow card) 90+3'	Report	Dener (yellow card) 3'; Rafael Silva (yellow card) 20'; Marcelinho 83'	Stadium: Pacaembu; Attendance: 29,166; Referee: Antonio Rogério Batista do Prado

Source: Soccerway.com

== Copa do Brasil ==
The competition is a single elimination knockout tournament featuring two-legged ties. In the first two rounds, if the away team wins the first match by 2 or more goals, it progresses straight to the next round avoiding the second leg. The away goals rule is also used in the Copa do Brasil. The winner qualifies for the 2015 Copa Libertadores.

Draw held on January 10.

=== First round ===
March 12 First leg	Vilhena (Rondônia)	0–1	(São Paulo (state)) Palmeiras	Vilhena
19:30 (UTC–3)	Alex Barcellos (yellow card) 45+1'; Carlinhos (yellow card) 51'; Marcos Cucaú (yellow card) 82'; Junior (yellow card) 84'; Edilsinho (yellow card) 90+1'	Report	Valdivia (yellow card) 41'; Marcelo Oliveira (yellow card) 85'; Leandro 87'	Stadium: Portal da Amazônia; Attendance: 5,618; Referee: Paulo Schleich Vollkopf (Mato Grosso do Sul)

April 2 Second leg	Palmeiras (São Paulo (state))	2–0 (3–0 agg.)	(Rondônia) Vilhena	São Paulo
22:00 (UTC–3)	Bruno César (yellow card) 40', (goal) 72', 77' (pen.); Leandro (yellow card) 67'; Eguren (yellow card) 73'	Report	Carlinhos (yellow card) 2'; Edilsinho (yellow card) 15'; Junior (yellow card) 24'; Tayron (yellow card) 64'; Dalton (yellow card) 76'	Stadium: Pacaembu; Attendance: 4,897; Referee: Wanderson Alves de Sousa (Minas Gerais)

=== Second round ===
May 7 First leg	Sampaio Corrêa (Maranhão)	2–1	(São Paulo (state)) Palmeiras	São Luís
22:00 (UTC–3)	Jonas (yellow card) 44'; Uillian (yellow card) 68'; Edimar 81'; Edgar 84', (yellow card) 84'	Report	Wendel (yellow card) 35'; Henrique 66'; Juninho (yellow card) 78'	Stadium: Castelão; Attendance: 18,555; Referee: Pathrice Wallace Correa Maia (Rio de Janeiro)

May 14 Second leg	Palmeiras (São Paulo (state))	3–0 (4–2 agg.)	(Maranhão) Sampaio Corrêa	São Paulo
22:00 (UTC–3)	Leandro (yellow card) 45+1'; Wendel (yellow card) 49'; Mendieta 65'; Diogo (yellow card) 88'; Henrique 90'; Felipe Menezes 90+2'	Report	Válber (yellow card) 18'; Edimar (yellow card) 72'	Stadium: Pacaembu; Attendance: 8,701; Referee: Marcos André Gomes da Penha (Espírito Santo)

=== Third round ===
23 July First leg	Avaí (Santa Catarina (state))	0–2	(São Paulo (state)) Palmeiras	Florianópolis
19:30 (UTC–3)	Eduardo Costa (yellow card) 29'; Marrone (yellow card) 29'; Marquinhos (yellow card) 31'	Report	Wesley (yellow card) 33'; Josimar (yellow card) 45+1'; Felipe Menezes 62', 70'; Victor Luis (yellow card) 63'; Mouche (yellow card) 65'	Stadium: Ressacada; Attendance: 8,512; Referee: Wagner Reway (Mato Grosso)

6 August Second leg	Palmeiras (São Paulo (state))	1–0 (3–0 agg.)	(Santa Catarina (state)) Avaí	São Paulo
19:30 (UTC–3)	Leandro (yellow card) 66'; Mouche 76'	Report	Pablo (yellow card) 61'	Stadium: Pacaembu; Attendance: 7,335; Referee: Paulo Schleich Vollkopf (Mato Grosso do Sul)

=== Round of 16 ===
For this round a draw will be held, which happened on August 18.

August 27 First leg	Palmeiras (São Paulo (state))	0–1	(Minas Gerais) Atlético Mineiro	São Paulo
22:00 (UTC−3)	Mendieta (yellow card) 54'	Report	Rafael Carioca (yellow card) 15'; Jemerson (yellow card) 44'; Josué (yellow card) 61'; Alex Silva (yellow card) 65'; Luan 70'; Marion (yellow card) 88'	Stadium: Pacaembu; Attendance: 19,340; Referee: Jean Pierre Gonçalves Lima (Rio Grande do Sul)

September 4 Second leg	Atlético Mineiro (Minas Gerais)	2–0 (3–0 agg.)	(São Paulo (state)) Palmeiras	Belo Horizonte
20:00 (UTC−3)	Jemerson 12'; Luan 16', (yellow card) 24'; Leonardo Silva (yellow card) 69'; Dátolo (yellow card) 79'	Report	Lúcio (yellow card) 18'; Diogo (yellow card) 26'; Henrique (yellow card) 70'; Tobio (red card) 90+1'	Stadium: Independência; Attendance: 19,657; Referee: Paulo Henrique de Godoy Bezerra (Santa Catarina)

Source: Soccerway.com

== Campeonato Brasileiro ==
=== Standings ===
Pos	Team	Pld	W	D	L	GF	GA	GD	Pts	Qualification or relegation
14	Coritiba	38	12	11	15	42	45	−3	47	
15	Chapecoense	38	11	10	17	39	44	−5	43	
16	Palmeiras	38	11	7	20	34	59	−25	40	
17	Vitória (R)	38	10	8	20	37	54	−17	38	Relegation to 2015 Campeonato Brasileiro Série B
18	Bahia (R)	38	9	10	19	31	43	−12	37	Relegation to 2015 Campeonato Brasileiro Série B

Updated to match(es) played on unknown. Source: Soccerway.com
Rules for classification: 1) points; 2) wins; 3) goal difference; 4) goals scored; 5) head-to-head results; 6) least red cards received; 7) least yellow cards received; 8) draw.
(R) Relegated

=== Matches ===
Schedule released on February 6. The first nine rounds (dates, times and stadiums) were detailed on March 18. The matches had a break during the 2014 FIFA World Cup which was held between June and July in Brazil. The competition was played nine rounds before the stoppage.

April 20 1	Criciúma	1–2	Palmeiras	Criciúma
18:30 (UTC–3)	Paulo Baier 11'; João Vitor (yellow card) 29'; Escudero (yellow card) 56'; Silvinho (yellow card) 71'	Report	Valdivia (yellow card) 22'; Marcelo Oliveira (yellow card) 25'; Fernando Prass (yellow card) 71'; Leandro 82'; Alan Kardec 87', (yellow card) 90+1'; Josimar (yellow card) 90'	Stadium: Heriberto Hülse; Attendance: 11,768; Referee: André Luiz de Freitas Castro (Goiás)

April 26 2	Palmeiras	0–1	Fluminense	São Paulo
21:00 (UTC–3)	Valdivia (yellow card) 85'	Report	Rafael Sóbis 44'; Conca (yellow card) 63'; Wágner (yellow card) 74'	Stadium: Pacaembu; Attendance: 11,189; Referee: Dewson Fernando Freitas da Silva (Pará)

May 4 3	Flamengo	4–2	Palmeiras	Rio de Janeiro
16:00 (UTC–3)	Paulinho 13'; Márcio Araújo 49'; Negueba (yellow card) 50'; Alecsandro 59', 72'; André Santos (yellow card) 76'	Report	Wesley 10'; Henrique 30', (yellow card) 90+1'; Josimar (yellow card) 39'; Juninho (yellow card) 55'; Mendieta (yellow card) 90+1'	Stadium: Maracanã; Attendance: 21,082; Referee: Paulo Henrique de Godoy Bezerra (Santa Catarina)

May 10 4	Palmeiras	2–0	Goiás	São Paulo
18:30 (UTC–3)	Lúcio 15', (yellow card) 28'; Wesley (yellow card) 29'; Henrique 31', (yellow card) 87'; Fábio (yellow card) 45+1'; Valdivia (yellow card) 85'	Report	Amaral (yellow card) 14'; Alex Alves (yellow card) 33'; Édson (yellow card) 69'; Jackson (yellow card) 73'	Stadium: Pacaembu; Attendance: 7,250; Referee: Felipe Gomes da Silva (Paraná)

May 18 5	Vitória	0–1	Palmeiras	Salvador
18:30 (UTC–3)		Report	Marquinhos Gabriel 49'	Stadium: Pituaçu; Attendance: 9,670; Referee: Leandro Vuaden (Rio Grande do Sul)

May 22 6	Palmeiras	1–0	Figueirense	Araraquara
19:30 (UTC–3)	Wendel (yellow card) 10'; Henrique 36'; William Matheus (yellow card) 82'	Report	Luan (yellow card) 51'; Thiago Heleno (yellow card) 58'; Marquinhos (yellow card) 60'	Stadium: Fonte Luminosa; Attendance: 10,870; Referee: Paulo Schleich Vollkopf (Mato Grosso do Sul)

May 25 7	Chapecoense	2–0	Palmeiras	Chapecó
18:30 (UTC–3)	Fabiano (yellow card) 32'; Tiago Luís 41'; Neném (yellow card) 45'; Dedé 46'	Report	Wesley (yellow card) 28'; Lúcio (yellow card) 59'	Stadium: Arena Condá; Attendance: 6,275; Referee: Emerson de Almeida Ferreira (Minas Gerais)

May 28 8	Palmeiras	0–2	Botafogo	Presidente Prudente
19:30 (UTC–3)	Wesley (yellow card) 54' (yellow-red card) 70'	Report	Bolatti (yellow card) 8', (goal) 60'; Emerson (yellow card) 15'; Rodrigo Souto (yellow card) 86'; Zeballos 90+3'	Stadium: Prudentão; Attendance: 5,681; Referee: Héber Lopes (Santa Catarina)

June 1 9	Grêmio	0–0	Palmeiras	Caxias do Sul
16:00 (UTC–3)	Werley (yellow card) 38'; Maxi Rodríguez (yellow card) 70'; Ramiro (yellow card) 75'	Report	Henrique (yellow card) 38'; Marcelo Oliveira (yellow card) 40'; Lúcio (yellow card) 56'; Renato (yellow card) 85'; Marquinhos Gabriel (yellow card) 86'	Stadium: Alfredo Jaconi; Attendance: 17,034; Referee: Jailson Macêdo Freitas (Bahia)

July 17 10	Santos	2–0	Palmeiras	Santos
19:30 (UTC–3)	Gabriel (yellow card) 4'; Bruno Uvini 23'; Alison 68'	Report	Wellington (yellow card) 25'; Marcelo Oliveira (yellow card) 47'; Wesley (yellow card) 60'	Stadium: Vila Belmiro; Attendance: 11,174; Referee: Raphael Claus (São Paulo)

July 20 11	Palmeiras	1–2	Cruzeiro	São Paulo
16:00 (UTC–3)	Tobio 53'; Mendieta (yellow card) 57'; Henrique (yellow card) 76'	Report	Ricardo Goulart 7'; Manoel 10'; Lucas Silva (yellow card) 15'; Henrique (yellow card) 52'; Egídio (yellow card) 55'; Fábio (yellow card) 69'; Willian Farias (yellow card) 71'	Stadium: Pacaembu; Attendance: 14,970; Referee: Wilton Pereira Sampaio (Goiás)

July 27 12	Corinthians	2–0	Palmeiras	São Paulo
16:00 (UTC–3)	Guerrero 50', (yellow card) 71'; Petros 90+1'	Report	Henrique (yellow card) 63'; Wendel (yellow card) 71'	Stadium: Arena Corinthians; Attendance: 31,031; Referee: Sandro Ricci (São Paulo)

August 3 13	Palmeiras	1–1	Bahia	São Paulo
16:00 (UTC–3)	Wendel (yellow card) 10'; Lúcio (yellow card) 23'; Leandro (yellow card) 59'; Henrique 60'	Report	Titi (yellow card) 3'; Rhayner (yellow card) 22'; Kieza 62', (yellow card) 69'	Stadium: Pacaembu; Attendance: 16,805; Referee: Marcelo de Lima Henrique (Rio de Janeiro)

August 10 14	Atlético Mineiro	2–1	Palmeiras	Belo Horizonte
18:30 (UTC–3)	Josué (yellow card) 16'; Diego Tardelli 44'; Luan (yellow card) 85'; Dátolo 87'	Report	Henrique 53'; Wesley (yellow card) 65'; Tobio (yellow card) 78'	Stadium: Independência; Attendance: 14,089; Referee: Wagner do Nascimento Magalhães (Rio de Janeiro)

August 17 15	Palmeiras	1–2	São Paulo	São Paulo
16:00 (UTC–3)	Tobio (yellow card) 48'; Henrique 60' (pen.); Lúcio (yellow card) 64'	Report	Souza (yellow card) 9'; Alexandre Pato 53'; Edson Silva (yellow card) 59'; Toloi (yellow card) 67'; Álvaro Pereira (yellow card) 73'; Alan Kardec 88'	Stadium: Pacaembu; Attendance: 21,643; Referee: Péricles Bassols (Rio de Janeiro)

August 20 16	Sport	2–1	Palmeiras	São Lourenço da Mata
19:30 (UTC–3)	Fábio 22' (o.g.); Patric 32'	Report	Henrique 13'; Victorino (yellow card) 25'	Stadium: Arena Pernambuco; Attendance: 21,802; Referee: Héber Lopes (Santa Catarina)

August 23 17	Palmeiras	1–0	Coritiba	São Paulo
21:00 (UTC–3)	Juninho 13'; Marcelo Oliveira (yellow card) 17'; Leandro (yellow card) 22'; Tobio (yellow card) 55'; Wendel (yellow card) 73'; Gabriel Dias (yellow card) 86'; Henrique (yellow card) 90+1'	Report	Baraka (yellow card) 26'; Welinton (yellow card) 35'; Robinho (yellow card) 43'; Leandro Almeida (red card) 45+1'; Zé Eduardo (yellow card) 55'	Stadium: Pacaembu; Attendance: 20,522; Referee: Marcos André Gomes da Penha (Espírito Santo)

August 30 18	Palmeiras	0–1	Internacional	São Paulo
18:30 (UTC–3)	Mendieta (yellow card) 13'; Eguren (yellow card) 50'	Report	Rafael Moura (yellow card) 10'; Paulão (yellow card) 16'; Jorge Henrique 19'; Gilberto (yellow card) 52'	Stadium: Pacaembu; Attendance: 33,519; Referee: Ricardo Marques Ribeiro (Minas Gerais)

September 7 19	Atlético Paranaense	1–1	Palmeiras	Curitiba
18:30 (UTC–3)	Cleberson (yellow card) 22'; Dellatorre 29', (yellow card) 30'; Wéverton (yellow card) 62'	Report	Henrique 52' (pen.); Josimar (red card) 62'	Stadium: Arena da Baixada; Attendance: 19,559; Referee: Leandro Vuaden (Rio Grande do Sul)

September 10 20	Palmeiras	1–0	Criciúma	São Paulo
19:30 (UTC–3)	Victorino (yellow card) 41'; Eguren (yellow card) 62'; Cristaldo (yellow card) 70', (goal) 81'; Diogo (yellow card) 90+1'	Report	Luís Felipe (yellow card) 44'; Rodrigo Souza (yellow card) 56'; João Vitor (yellow card) 80'	Stadium: Pacaembu; Attendance: 18,797; Referee: Cleisson Veloso Pereira (Minas Gerais)

September 13 21	Fluminense	3–0	Palmeiras	Rio de Janeiro
18:30 (UTC–3)	Fred 6', 34' (pen.); Wágner (yellow card) 49'; Conca 62'	Report	Diogo (yellow card) 51'; Eguren (yellow card) 61'; Cristaldo (yellow card) 66'; Victorino (yellow card) 89'	Stadium: Maracanã; Attendance: 15,238; Referee: Elmo Alves Resende Cunha (Goiás)

September 17 22	Palmeiras	2–2	Flamengo	São Paulo
22:00 (UTC–3)	Juninho (yellow card) 7'; Diogo 47'; Victor Luis 68'; Valdivia (red card) 81'	Report	Canteros 12', (yellow card) 36'; Alecsandro (yellow card) 18', (goal) 31'; Cáceres (yellow card) 40'; Chicão (yellow card) 67'	Stadium: Pacaembu; Attendance: 20,587; Referee: Anderson Daronco (Rio Grande do Sul)

September 21 23	Goiás	6–0	Palmeiras	Goiânia
18:30 (UTC–3)	Ramón 6'; Esquerdinha 11'; Erik 27'; David 37', (yellow card) 69'; Jackson (yellow card) 45'; Thiago Mendes 48'; Moisés (yellow card) 78'; Welinton Júnior 90'	Report	Diogo (yellow card) 39'; Allione (red card) 72'	Stadium: Serra Dourada; Attendance: 7,845; Referee: Igor Júnio Benevenuto (Minas Gerais)

September 25 24	Palmeiras	2–0	Vitória	São Paulo
19:30 (UTC–3)	Lúcio 25'; Nathan (yellow card) 35'; Juninho (yellow card) 48'; Henrique 62'	Report	Richarlyson (yellow card) 50'; Juan (yellow card) 54'; Luis Aguiar (yellow card) 75'; Mansur (yellow card) 77'	Stadium: Pacaembu; Attendance: 16,192; Referee: Wilton Pereira Sampaio (Goiás)

September 28 25	Figueirense	3–1	Palmeiras	Florianópolis
18:30 (UTC–3)	Paulo Roberto (yellow card) 21'; Nirley (yellow card) 71'; Clayton 76', 77'; Marcão 80'	Report	Marcelo Oliveira (yellow card) 20'; Cristaldo 34'; Henrique (yellow card) 38'; Bruninho (yellow card) 68'; Nathan (red card) 88'	Stadium: Orlando Scarpelli; Attendance: 7,220; Referee: Dewson Fernando Freitas da Silva (Pará)

October 2 26	Palmeiras	4–2	Chapecoense	São Paulo
19:30 (UTC–3)	Wesley 52'; Henrique 57', 65' (pen.), 69' (pen.)	Report	Zezinho (yellow card) 19'; Fabinho Alves (yellow card) 37'; Leandro 40', 90+2'; Rodrigo Biro (yellow card) 69'	Stadium: Pacaembu; Attendance: 15,447; Referee: Leandro Vuaden (Rio Grande do Sul)

October 8 27	Botafogo	0–1	Palmeiras	Rio de Janeiro
19:30 (UTC–3)	Matheus (yellow card) 23'; Carlos Alberto (yellow card) 75'; Luis Ramírez (yellow card) 81'	Report	Marcelo Oliveira (yellow card) 38'; Henrique 49'; Juninho (yellow card) 55'; Valdivia (yellow card) 73'	Stadium: Maracanã; Attendance: 10,200; Referee: Fabrício Neves Corrêa (Rio Grande do Sul)

October 11 28	Palmeiras	2–1	Grêmio	São Paulo
21:00 (UTC–3)	Lúcio (yellow card) 12'; Mouche 67'; João Pedro 74'	Report	Fellipe Bastos (yellow card) 8'; Barcos (yellow card) 12' (yellow-red card) 62', (goal) 55' (pen.); Riveros (yellow card) 65'; Dudu (yellow card) 80'; Ramiro (yellow card) 90+1'	Stadium: Pacaembu; Attendance: 29,353; Referee: Sandro Ricci (Pernambuco)

October 19 29	Palmeiras	1–3	Santos	São Paulo
16:00 (UTC–2)	Valdivia (yellow card) 7'; Wesley (yellow card) 45+2'; Henrique (yellow card) 81', (goal) 85'	Report	Alison (yellow card) 31'; Geuvânio 38', (yellow card) 73'; Gabriel 41', 48'; Mena (yellow card) 55'; Robinho (yellow card) 60'; David Braz (yellow card) 67'; Edu Dracena (yellow card) 90+1'	Stadium: Pacaembu; Attendance: 33,034; Referee: Flávio Rodrigues da Souza (São Paulo)

October 22 30	Cruzeiro	1–1	Palmeiras	Belo Horizonte
19:30 (UTC–2)	Egídio (yellow card) 59'; Dagoberto 90+2'	Report	Bernardo (yellow card) 22'; João Pedro (yellow card) 56'; Juninho (yellow card) 59'; Mouche 88', (yellow card) 89'	Stadium: Mineirão; Attendance: 28,618; Referee: Péricles Bassols (Rio de Janeiro)

October 25 31	Palmeiras	1–1	Corinthians	São Paulo
16:20 (UTC–2)	Henrique 25', (yellow card) 54'; Marcelo Oliveira (yellow card) 41'; Nathan (yellow card) 44'; Juninho (yellow card) 80'; Washington (yellow card) 90+3'	Report	Fábio Santos (yellow card) 41'; Luciano (yellow card) 44'; Petros (yellow card) 54'; Danilo 90'	Stadium: Pacaembu; Attendance: 25,550; Referee: Flávio Rodrigues da Souza (São Paulo)

November 2 32	Bahia	0–1	Palmeiras	Salvador
20:00 (UTC–2)	Douglas Pires (yellow card) 38'; Guilherme Santos (yellow card) 60'; Kieza (yellow card) 75'; Maxi Biancucchi (yellow card) 77'	Report	Mazinho 35'; Marcelo Oliveira (yellow card) 48'; Wesley (yellow card) 56'; Allione (yellow card) 89'	Stadium: Fonte Nova; Attendance: 15,439; Referee: Leandro Vuaden (Rio Grande do Sul)

November 8 33	Palmeiras	0–2	Atlético Mineiro	São Paulo
19:30 (UTC–2)		Report	Tiago 38'; Pierre (yellow card) 56'; Dodô 64'	Stadium: Pacaembu; Attendance: 26,630; Referee: Emerson Luiz Sobral (Pernambuco)

November 16 34	São Paulo	2–0	Palmeiras	São Paulo
19:30 (UTC–2)	Luís Fabiano 21'; Edson Silva (yellow card) 28'; Souza (yellow card) 33'; Alan Kardec (yellow card) 64'; Toloi 78'	Report	Fernando Prass (yellow card) 23'; Cristaldo (yellow card) 80'	Stadium: Morumbi; Attendance: 36,850; Referee: Marcelo Aparecido de Souza (São Paulo)

November 19 35	Palmeiras	0–2	Sport	São Paulo
22:00 (UTC–2)	Marcelo Oliveira (yellow card) 28'; Henrique (yellow card) 90+1'	Report	Joelinton (yellow card) 5'; Ananias 77'; Patric 90'	Stadium: Allianz Parque; Attendance: 35,939; Referee: Dewson Fernando Freitas da Silva (Pará)

November 23 36	Coritiba	2–0	Palmeiras	Curitiba
19:30 (UTC–2)	Zé Eduardo (yellow card) 18', (goal) 54'; Joel 70'; Carlinhos (yellow card) 77'; Welinton (yellow card) 84'	Report	Renato (yellow card) 33'; Juninho (yellow card) 47'; Nathan (yellow card) 72'; Allione (yellow card) 90+2'	Stadium: Couto Pereira; Attendance: 22,787; Referee: Elmo Alves Resende Cunha (Goiás)

November 29 37	Internacional	3–1	Palmeiras	Porto Alegre
19:30 (UTC–2)	Taiberson 23'; Gilberto (yellow card) 36'; D'Alessandro (yellow card) 45+2'; Fabrício 64', (red card) 90+3'; Valdívia 79'	Report	Renato 38'; Allione (yellow card) 62' (yellow-red card) 86'; Bruno César (red card) 90+2'	Stadium: Beira-Rio; Attendance: 41,148; Referee: Ricardo Marques Ribeiro (Minas Gerais)

December 7 38	Palmeiras	1–1	Atlético Paranaense	São Paulo
17:00 (UTC–2)	Henrique 19' (pen.); Cristaldo (yellow card) 56'	Report	Ricardo Silva 9'; Dráusio (yellow card) 18'	Stadium: Allianz Parque; Attendance: 33,151; Referee: Leandro Vuaden (Rio Grande do Sul)

Notes

1. Note 1: Palmeiras can not host games in the Pacaembu stadium on May 16 to July 16. The stadium was handed over to FIFA for 2014 FIFA World Cup events.

Source: Soccerway.com

== Transfers ==
=== In ===
P	Nat.	Name	Age	Moving from	Type	Source
MF	(Brazil)	Diego Souza	21	(Brazil) Oeste	Loan return	
FW	(Brazil)	Rodolfo	20	(Brazil) Rio Claro	Sign	
MF	(Brazil)	João Denoni	19	(Brazil) Oeste	Loan return	
MF	(Brazil)	França	22	(Germany) Hannover	Loan	
FW	(Brazil)	Diogo	26	(Brazil) Portuguesa	Sign	
FW	(Brazil)	Patrick Vieira	21	(Japan) Yokohama FC	Loan return	
FW	(Brazil)	Mazinho	26	(Japan) Vissel Kobe	Loan return	
FW	(Brazil)	Miguel	21	(South Korea) Chungju Hummel	Loan return	
FW	(Brazil)	Tutinha	21	(South Korea) Chungju Hummel	Loan return	
DF	(Brazil)	Luiz Gustavo	19	(Brazil) Vitória	Loan return	
DF	(Brazil)	Wellington	22	(Brazil) ASA	Loan return	
DF	(Brazil)	Lúcio	35	(Brazil) São Paulo	Sign	
DF	(Uruguay)	Victorino	31	(Brazil) Cruzeiro	Loan	
FW	(Brazil)	Leandro	20	(Brazil) Grêmio	Sign	
DF	(Brazil)	William Matheus	23	(Brazil) Goiás	Sign	
MF	(Brazil)	Marquinhos Gabriel	23	(Brazil) Bahia	Loan	
MF	(Brazil)	Bruno César	25	(Saudi Arabia) Al-Ahli	Loan	
DF	(Brazil)	Paulo Henrique	20	Free agent	Sign	
MF	(Brazil)	Josimar	27	(Brazil) Internacional	Loan	
MF	(Brazil)	Bruninho	21	(Brazil) Portuguesa	Sign	
FW	(Brazil)	Henrique	24	(Brazil) Portuguesa	Loan	
MF	(Brazil)	Bernardo	23	(Brazil) Vasco	Loan	
DF	(Argentina)	Fernando Tobio	24	(Argentina) Vélez Sarsfield	Sign	
FW	(Argentina)	Pablo Mouche	26	(Turkey) Kayserispor	Sign	
MF	(Argentina)	Agustín Allione	19	(Argentina) Vélez Sarsfield	Sign	
FW	(Argentina)	Jonathan Cristaldo	25	(Ukraine) Metalist Kharkiv	Sign	
GK	(Brazil)	Jailson	33	(Brazil) Ceará	Sign	
MF	(Brazil)	Washington	25	(Brazil) Joinville	Loan	

=== Out ===
P	Nat.	Name	Age	Moving to	Type	Source
DF	(Brazil)	Fernandinho	28	(Brazil) Oeste	Loan return	
MF	(Brazil)	Patrik	23	(Brazil) Rio Claro	Loan	
MF	(Brazil)	Léo Gago	30	(Brazil) Grêmio	Loan return	
FW	(Brazil)	Rondinelly	22	(Brazil) Grêmio	Loan return	
MF	(Brazil)	Ronny	22	None	Released	
MF	(Brazil)	Ananias	24	(Brazil) Cruzeiro	Loan return	
DF	(Brazil)	Vilson	24	None	Released	
MF	(Brazil)	Márcio Araújo	29	None	Released	
DF	(Brazil)	André Luiz	33	None	End of contract	
GK	(Brazil)	Deola	30	(Brazil) Atlético Sorocaba	Loan	
MF	(Brazil)	Charles	28	(Brazil) Cruzeiro	Loan return	
DF	(Brazil)	Luiz Gustavo	19	(Brazil) Vitória	Loan	
DF	(Brazil)	Henrique	27	(Italy) Napoli	Sign	
DF	(Brazil)	Leandro Amaro	27	(Brazil) Chapecoense	Loan	
FW	(Brazil)	Vinícius	20	(Brazil) Vitória	Loan	
FW	(Brazil)	Alan Kardec	25	(Brazil) São Paulo	Sign	
DF	(Brazil)	Bruno Oliveira	21	(Brazil) Guarani	Loan	
FW	(Brazil)	Serginho	23	None	Released	
DF	(Brazil)	França	23	(Brazil) Figueirense	Loan	
DF	(Brazil)	Paulo Henrique	21	(Brazil) América de Natal	Loan	
DF	(Brazil)	Luís Felipe	23	(Portugal) Benfica	Sign	
DF	(Brazil)	Tiago Alves	30	(Brazil) Ponte Preta	Loan	
FW	(Brazil)	Miguel	22	(Brazil) Ponte Preta	Loan	
DF	(Brazil)	William Matheus	24	(France) Toulouse	Sign	
MF	(Brazil)	Josimar	28	(Brazil) Ponte Preta	Loan	

== Statistics ==
=== Overall statistics ===
As of December 7, 2014

Games played	63 (17 Campeonato Paulista, 8 Copa do Brasil, 38 Campeonato Brasileiro Série A)
Games won	28 (12 Campeonato Paulista, 5 Copa do Brasil, 11 Campeonato Brasileiro)
Games drawn	10 (2 Campeonato Paulista, 1 Copa do Brasil, 7 Campeonato Brasileiro)
Games lost	25 (3 Campeonato Paulista, 3 Copa do Brasil, 20 Campeonato Brasileiro)
Goals scored	74
Goals conceded	79
Goal difference	–5 (+15 Campeonato Paulista, +5 Copa do Brasil, –25 Campeonato Brasileiro)
Best result	4–1 (vs. Atlético Sorocaba – Campeonato Paulista, January 26); 3–0 (vs. Sampaio Corrêa – Copa do Brasil, May 14)
Worst result	0–6 (vs. Goiás – Campeonato Brasileiro, September 21)
Yellow cards	153
Red cards	11
Top scorer	Henrique (18 goals)
Clean sheets	21
Most clean sheets	Fernando Prass (10)
Worst discipline	Marcelo Oliveira (14 (yellow card) , 1 (red card) )

=== Goalscorers ===
In italic players who left the team in mid-season.

Place	Position	Nationality	Number	Name	Campeonato Paulista	Copa do Brasil	Série A	Total
1	FW	(Brazil)	19	Henrique	0	2	16	18
2	FW	(Brazil)	14	Alan Kardec	9	0	1	10
3	MF	(Brazil)	11	Wesley	3	0	2	5
4	MF	(Chile)	10	Valdivia	4	0	0	4
4	DF	(Brazil)	6	Juninho	3	0	1	4
5	FW	(Brazil)	38	Leandro	1	1	1	3
5	MF	(Paraguay)	8	Mendieta	2	1	0	3
5	MF	(Brazil)	18	Felipe Menezes	0	3	0	3
5	FW	(Argentina)	14	Mouche	0	1	2	3
6	MF	(Brazil)	30	Bruno César	0	2	0	2
6	MF	(Brazil)	40	Marquinhos Gabriel	1	0	1	2
6	FW	(Argentina)	9	Cristaldo	0	0	2	2
6	FW	(Brazil)	27	Mazinho	1	0	1	2
7	MF	(Brazil)	28	França	1	0	0	1
7	DF	(Brazil)	16	William Matheus	1	0	0	1
7	FW	(Brazil)	39	Miguel	1	0	0	1
7	MF	(Brazil)	21	Patrick Vieira	1	0	0	1
7	MF	(Uruguay)	5	Eguren	1	0	0	1
7	DF	(Brazil)	33	Lúcio	0	0	1	1
7	DF	(Argentina)	2	Tobio	0	0	1	1
7	FW	(Brazil)	18	Diogo	0	0	1	1
7	DF	(Brazil)	35	Victor Luis	0	0	1	1
7	DF	(Brazil)	3	Lúcio	0	0	1	1
7	DF	(Brazil)	54	João Pedro	0	0	1	1
7	MF	(Brazil)	23	Renato	0	0	1	1

=== Disciplinary record ===
In italic players who left the team in mid-season.

Number	Nationality	Position	Name	Campeonato Paulista		Copa do Brasil		Série A		Total	
Number	Nationality	Position	Name	Yellow card	Red card	Yellow card	Red card	Yellow card	Red card	Yellow card	Red card
1	(Brazil)	GK	Bruno	0	0	0	0	0	0	0	0
2	(Argentina)	DF	Tobio	0	0	0	1	3	0	3	1
3/33	(Brazil)	DF	Lúcio	3	0	1	0	6	0	10	0
3	(Brazil)	DF	Henrique	0	0	0	0	0	0	0	0
5	(Uruguay)	MF	Eguren	2	0	1	0	3	0	6	0
6	(Brazil)	DF	Juninho	3	0	1	0	7	0	11	0
8	(Paraguay)	MF	Mendieta	2	0	1	0	3	0	6	0
9	(Argentina)	FW	Cristaldo	0	0	0	0	4	0	4	0
10	(Chile)	MF	Valdivia	7	0	1	0	5	1	13	1
11	(Brazil)	MF	Wesley	0	0	1	0	8	1	9	1
13	(Brazil)	MF	Wendel	2	0	2	0	4	0	8	0
14	(Argentina)	FW	Mouche	0	0	1	0	1	0	2	0
14	(Brazil)	FW	Alan Kardec	0	1	0	0	1	0	1	1
15	(Brazil)	MF	Josimar	0	0	1	0	2	1	3	1
16	(Brazil)	DF	William Matheus	1	0	1	0	0	0	2	0
17	(Brazil)	FW	Diogo	0	0	2	0	3	0	5	0
18	(Brazil)	MF	Felipe Menezes	0	0	0	0	0	0	0	0
19	(Brazil)	FW	Vinícius	1	0	0	0	0	0	1	0
19	(Brazil)	FW	Henrique	0	0	1	0	10	0	11	0
20	(Argentina)	MF	Allione	0	0	0	0	4	2	4	2
20/40	(Brazil)	MF	Marquinhos Gabriel	0	0	0	0	1	0	1	0
20	(Brazil)	FW	Serginho	1	0	0	0	0	0	1	0
21	(Brazil)	FW	Patrick Vieira	0	0	0	0	0	0	0	0
22	(Brazil)	DF	Luiz Gustavo	0	0	0	0	0	0	0	0
22	(Brazil)	GK	Deola	0	0	0	0	0	0	0	0
23	(Brazil)	MF	Renato	1	0	0	0	2	0	3	0
25	(Brazil)	GK	Fernando Prass	0	0	0	0	2	0	2	0
26	(Brazil)	DF	Marcelo Oliveira	4	1	1	0	9	0	14	1
27	(Brazil)	FW	Mazinho	0	0	0	0	0	0	0	0
28	(Brazil)	MF	França	4	0	0	0	0	0	4	0
4/28	(Uruguay)	DF	Victorino	0	0	0	0	3	0	3	0
29	(Brazil)	FW	Rodolfo	0	0	0	0	0	0	0	0
30	(Brazil)	MF	Bruno César	1	1	1	0	0	1	2	2
31	(Brazil)	DF	Paulo Henrique	0	0	0	0	0	0	0	0
31	(Brazil)	MF	Bernardo	0	0	0	0	1	0	1	0
32	(Brazil)	DF	Bruno Oliveira	0	0	0	0	0	0	0	0
32	(Brazil)	DF	Weldinho	0	0	0	0	0	0	0	0
33	(Brazil)	MF	Washington	0	0	0	0	1	0	1	0
34	(Brazil)	DF	Wellington	3	0	0	1	0	0	4	0
35	(Brazil)	DF	Victor Luis	0	0	1	0	0	0	1	0
36	(Brazil)	GK	Jailson	0	0	0	0	0	0	0	0
36	(Brazil)	DF	Tiago Alves	1	0	0	0	0	0	1	0
37	(Brazil)	MF	Bruninho	0	0	0	0	1	0	1	0
38	(Brazil)	FW	Leandro	4	0	3	0	2	0	9	0
39	(Brazil)	FW	Miguel	1	0	0	0	0	0	1	0
40	(Brazil)	MF	Matheus Muller	1	0	0	0	0	0	1	0
41	(Brazil)	DF	Thiago Martins	0	0	0	0	0	0	0	0
43	(Brazil)	DF	Gabriel Dias	0	0	0	0	0	0	0	0
44	(Brazil)	DF	Léo Cunha	0	0	0	0	0	0	0	0
45	(Brazil)	FW	Érik	0	0	0	0	0	0	0	0
47	(Brazil)	GK	Fábio	0	0	0	0	1	0	1	0
48	(Brazil)	GK	Vinicius	0	0	0	0	0	0	0	0
49	(Brazil)	FW	Chico	0	0	0	0	0	0	0	0
49	(Brazil)	MF	Eduardo Junior	0	0	0	0	0	0	0	0
53	(Brazil)	DF	Nathan	0	0	0	0	3	1	3	1
54	(Brazil)	DF	João Pedro	0	0	0	0	1	0	1	0
–	(Brazil)	DF	Luís Felipe	0	0	0	0	0	0	0	0
			TOTALS	40	3	21	1	88	5	153	10
