= Fábio Szymonek =

Brazilian footballer (born 1990)

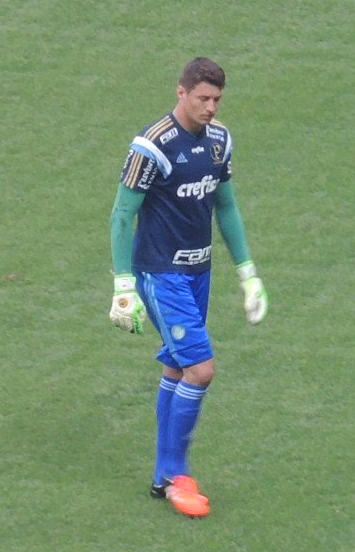
- Szymonek with Palmeiras in 2015

Personal information
- Full name: Fábio Szymonek
- Date of birth: 11 May 1990 (age 36)
- Place of birth: Osasco, Brazil
- Height: 1.96 m (6 ft 5 in)
- Position: Goalkeeper

Team information
- Current team: Clube Desportivo das Aves

Youth career
- 2004–2011: Palmeiras

Senior career*
Years	Team	Apps	(Gls)
2010–2015	Palmeiras	22	(0)
2010	→ Juventus (loan)	0	(0)
2016–2017	→ Oeste (loan)	5	(0)
2017	São Bento	3	(0)
2017–2018	Taubaté	15	(0)
2018–	Aves	7	(0)
- * Club domestic league appearances and goals

Fábio Szymonek (born 11 May 1990), sometimes simply known as Fábio, is a Brazilian footballer who plays for Desportivo das Aves, as a goalkeeper.

== Career ==
Born in Osasco, Szymonek was joined Palmeiras' youth categories in 2004, aged 15. After a loan stint with Juventus, he was promoted to the first-team squad in 2012, acting as a backup to Deola and Bruno.

On 4 October 2012, Szymonek signed a new five-year deal with Verdão, and played his first match as a professional on 12 November of the following year, as the club was already promoted, starting and playing the full 90 minutes in a 0–1 loss at Paysandu for the Série B championship.

In 2014, after Bruno's poor performances and Fernando Prass' injury, Szymonek was selected as Palmeiras' first-choice. On 28 June 2018, Szymonek signed with the Portuguese club Aves.

== Personal life ==
Szymonek is of Polish descent through his father.

== Honours ==
Palmeiras

- Campeonato Brasileiro Série B: 2013
- Copa do Brasil: 2015
