= 2014 Campeonato Paulista knockout stage =

The knockout stage of the 2014 Campeonato Paulista will begin on 26 March with the quarter-final and will be concluded on 13 April 2014 with the final. A total of eight teams compete in the knockout stage.

== Round and draw dates ==
All draws held at Federação Paulista de Futebol headquarters in São Paulo, Brazil.

Round	Draw date	First leg	Second leg
Quarter-finals	24 March 2014	26–27 March 2014	–
Semi-finals	27 March 2014	30 March 2014	–
Finals	31 March 2014	6 April 2014	13 April 2014

== Format ==
Each tie, apart from the final are played over two legs, and the team with the best campaign playing at home. The quarterfinals are played between the winners and runners-up of each group. In the semifinals the best team (first) will face the team with the worst campaign (fourth), while the second will face the team with the third best campaign.

== Qualified teams ==
Group	Winners	Runners-up
A	São Paulo	Penapolense
B	Botafogo–SP	Ituano
C	Santos	Ponte Preta
D	Palmeiras	Bragantino

=== Bracket ===
Quarterfinals
C1	Santos	4
C2	Ponte Preta	0
A1	São Paulo	0 (4)
A2	Penapolense (p)	0 (5)
D1	Palmeiras	2
D2	Bragantino	0
B1	Botafogo–SP	0 (1)
B2	Ituano (p)	0 (4)

Semifinals
C1	Santos	3
A2	Penapolense	2
D1	Palmeiras	0
B2	Ituano	1

Finals
C1	Santos	0	1	1 (6)
B2	Ituano (p)	1	0	1 (7)

== Quarterfinals ==
Team 1	Score	Team 2
Botafogo	0–0 (1–4 p)	Ituano
Santos	4–0	Ponte Preta
São Paulo	0–0 (4–5 p)	Penapolense
Palmeiras	2–0	Bragantino

26 March 2014
19:30 (UTC−03)

Botafogo	0 – 0	Ituano
	Report
Penalties
Hudson (penalty missed); Wellington Bruno (penalty scored); Borebi (penalty missed)	1 – 4	(penalty scored) Jackson Caucaia; (penalty scored) Anderson Salles; (penalty scored) Marcelinho; (penalty scored) Esquerdinha

Santa Cruz, Ribeirão Preto
Attendance: 9,742
Referee: Raphael Claus

26 March 2014
19:30 (UTC−03)

Santos	4 – 0	Ponte Preta
Cícero 22'; Geuvânio 49'; Gabriel 61'; Diego Cardoso 80'	Report

Vila Belmiro, Santos
Attendance: 10,039
Referee: Vinicius Furlan

26 March 2014
22:00 (UTC−03)

São Paulo	0 – 0	Penapolense
	Report
Penalties
Rogério Ceni (penalty scored); Luís Fabiano (penalty scored); Rodrigo Caio (penalty missed); Ganso (penalty scored); Osvaldo (penalty scored)	4 – 5	(penalty scored) Guarú; (penalty scored) Petros; (penalty scored) Washington; (penalty scored) Douglas Tanque; (penalty scored) Neto

Morumbi, São Paulo
Attendance: 16,955
Referee: Alessandro Darcie

27 March 2014
21:00 (UTC−03)

Palmeiras	2 – 0	Bragantino
Alan Kardec 21'; Wesley 62'	Report

Pacaembu, São Paulo
Attendance: 25,714
Referee: Flávio Rodrigues Guerra

== Semifinals ==
Team 1	Score	Team 2
Santos	3–2	Penapolense
Palmeiras	0–1	Ituano

March 30
16:00 (UTC−03)

Santos	3 – 2	Penapolense
Cícero 21'; Leandro Damião 60'; Stéfano Yuri 86'	Report	Guarú 26' (pen.); Douglas Tanque 35'

Vila Belmiro, Santos
Attendance: 12,409
Referee: Marcelo Rogério

March 30
18:30 (UTC−03)

Palmeiras	0 – 1	Ituano
	Report	Marcelinho 83'

Pacaembu, São Paulo
Attendance: 29,166
Referee: Antonio Rogério Batista do Prado

== Finals ==
Team 1	Agg.	Team 2	1st leg	2nd leg
Santos	1–1 (6–7 p)	Ituano	0–1	1–0

April 6
16:00 (UTC−03)

Ituano	1 – 0	Santos
Cristian 20'	Report

Pacaembu, São Paulo
Attendance: 27,144
Referee: Rodrigo Guarizo Ferreira do Amaral

April 13
16:00 (UTC−03)

Santos	1 – 0	Ituano
Cícero 45+1' (pen.)	Report
Penalties
Cícero (penalty scored); Alan Santos (penalty scored); David Braz (penalty scored); Rildo (penalty missed); Gabriel (penalty scored); Arouca (penalty scored); Alison (penalty scored); Neto (penalty missed)	6 – 7	(penalty scored) Jackson Caucaia; (penalty missed) Anderson Salles; (penalty scored) Marcelinho; (penalty scored) Esquerdinha; (penalty scored) Marcinho; (penalty scored) Jean Carlos; (penalty scored) Dener; (penalty scored) Josa

Pacaembu, São Paulo
Attendance: 34,964
Referee: Raphael Claus
