= Henrique Dourado =

Brazilian footballer (born 1989)

Personal information
- Full name: José Henrique da Silva Dourado
- Date of birth: 15 September 1989 (age 37)
- Place of birth: São Paulo, Brazil
- Height: 1.86 m (6 ft 1 in)
- Position: Forward

Team information
- Current team: Botafogo-PB
- Number: 9

Youth career
- Santos
- 2007–2008: Flamengo-SP

Senior career*
Years	Team	Apps	(Gls)
2008	Guarulhos	22	(3)
2009	Lemense	26	(14)
2010–2012	União São João	29	(7)
2011	→ Santo André (loan)	2	(1)
2011–2012	→ Cianorte (loan)	30	(14)
2012	→ Chapecoense (loan)	8	(5)
2013	Mogi Mirim	20	(8)
2013–2016	Mirassol	0	(0)
2013	→ Santos (loan)	3	(0)
2013–2014	→ Portuguesa (loan)	29	(10)
2014	→ Palmeiras (loan)	33	(16)
2015	→ Cruzeiro (loan)	8	(1)
2015	→ Vitória Guimarães B (loan)	2	(1)
2015–2016	→ Vitória Guimarães (loan)	28	(12)
2016–2017	Fluminense	55	(26)
2018–2019	Flamengo	31	(11)
2019–2022	Henan Jianye	50	(22)
2019	→ Palmeiras (loan)	4	(0)
2023	Cruzeiro	11	(1)
2023	Chapecoense	13	(0)
2024	Portuguesa	11	(1)
2024–	Botafogo-PB	57	(10)
- * Club domestic league appearances and goals as of 8 November 2026

José Henrique da Silva Dourado (born 15 September 1989), known as Henrique Dourado, is a Brazilian professional footballer who plays as a forward for Botafogo-PB.

== Career ==
=== Early career ===
Born in São Paulo, Dourado made his senior debut with Guarulhos, in the 2008 Campeonato Paulista Segunda Divisão (state league fourth division). In the following year, he joined Lemense in the same category, and scored 14 goals in the 2009 Paulista Segunda Divisão.

In 2010, Dourado signed a contract with União São João. In August 2011, he joined Santo André. He made his debut for the club on 21 August, against Joinville, and scored a goal almost a month later, against Brasil de Pelotas.

In September 2011, Dourado left Santo André and joined Cianorte. A year later, he joined Chapecoense. He helped the team to promotion, scoring 5 goals in only 8 matches. In December 2012, he signed a contract with Mogi Mirim. He made his Sapo debut on 20 January 2013, against Ponte Preta. He scored his first goal on the 31st, against Corinthians. On 27 April, he scored a hat-trick in a 6–0 routing against Botafogo-SP.

=== Santos ===
On 21 May 2013, Dourado signed a one-year loan deal with Santos, with his rights being assigned to Mirassol. Five days later, he made Peixe - and Série A - debut, in a 0–0 draw against Flamengo.

=== Portuguesa ===
On 9 September 2013, after only three league appearances for Santos, Dourado signed with Portuguesa. He scored three goals during the season, with Portuguesa being relegated despite finishing in 12th.

=== Palmeiras ===
After being the topscorer of Lusa in 2014 Campeonato Paulista, Dourado joined Palmeiras on 28 April 2014, on loan until the end of the year. He was the club's top goalscorer with 16 goals (the second-best in the competition) as his side narrowly avoided relegation.

=== Cruzeiro and Vitória de Guimarães ===
On 7 February 2015, Dourado was announced at Cruzeiro on loan until the end of the year. After scoring just once in six months, he moved to Portuguese club Vitória de Guimarães for the 2015–16 season, where he scored 12 goals in 30 games.

=== Fluminense ===
On 30 June 2016, Dourado returned to Brazil with Fluminense. The striker scored a penalty in normal time to help secure a 3–3 draw in the final of the 2017 Taça Guanabara, against bitter rivals Flamengo. Fluminense went on to win in the penalty shootout.

Playing for Fluminense, he was the top scorer of the 2017 Série A along with Jô (for Corinthians), both with 18 goals. In 2017, he was also the country's isolated top scorer amongst players of the top division, with 32 goals.

=== Flamengo ===
On 1 February 2018, Flamengo announced Dourado's signing paying the sum of R$11million (around US$3.47 million and €2.79 million) to acquire 75% of his economic rights.

=== Henan Jianye ===
On 1 March 2019, Dourado joined Chinese Super League club Henan Jianye. Two days later, in the opening game of the 2019 Chinese Super League season, Dourado scored his first goal for Henan in his debut in a 1–1 draw against Dalian Professional, then tragically broke his leg after a foul by Qin Sheng, effectively ended his season after just one game.

==== Return to Palmeiras (loan) ====
On 24 July 2019, Dourado accepted his return to Palmeiras on a six-month loan deal.

==== Return from loan ====
On 26 July 2020, Dourado made his comeback by scoring twice in a 4–3 defeat against Jiangsu Suning in the opening game of the 2020 Chinese Super League season.

On 21 August 2022, during a Chinese Super League game between Wuhan Yangtze River and Henan Songshan Longmen, Dourado deliberately knocked referee Ma Ning over after a heated quarrel between the two, and was subsequently sent off for violent conduct. The game finished 2–2. Five days later, the Chinese FA announced a 12-month suspension to Dourado, which was the severest penalty in the history of Chinese Super League. On 24 November 2022, as a result of the suspension, Dourado was released from Henan.

=== Cruzeiro return ===
On 18 April 2023, Dourado was announced at Cruzeiro. On 1 August, after just 11 matches and one goal, he reached an agreement to terminate his contract.

=== Chapecoense return ===
On 22 August 2023, Dourado returned to Chapecoense on a contract until the end of the year. He made 13 goalless appearances for Chape as they narrowly avoided relegation in the 2023 Série B.

=== Portuguesa return ===
On 6 December 2023, Dourado returned to Portuguesa after nearly ten years.

== Career statistics ==
As of 18 March 2024

Appearances and goals by club, season and competition
Club	Season	League			State League		Cup		Continental		Other		Total	
Club	Season	Division	Apps	Goals	Apps	Goals	Apps	Goals	Apps	Goals	Apps	Goals	Apps	Goals
Guarulhos	2008	Paulista 2ª Divisão	—		22	3	—		—		—		22	3
Lemense	2009	Paulista 2ª Divisão	—		26	14	—		—		—		26	14
União São João	2010	Paulista A2	—		12	3	—		—		13 (Note: Appearance(s) in Copa Paulista)	3	25	6
União São João	2011	Paulista A2	—		17	4	—		—		6	0	23	4
União São João	Total		—		29	7	—		—		19	3	48	10
Santo André	2011	Série C	2	1	—		—		—		—		2	1
Cianorte	2011	Série D	2	0	—		—		—		—		2	0
Cianorte	2012	Série D	7	5	21	9	—		—		—		28	14
Cianorte	Total		9	5	21	9	—		—		—		30	14
Chapecoense	2012	Série C	8	5	—		—		—		—		8	5
Mogi Mirim	2013	Série C	—		20	8	—		—		—		20	8
Santos	2013	Série A	3	0	—		1	0	—		—		4	0
Portuguesa	2013	Série A	15	3	—		—		—		—		15	3
Portuguesa	2014	Série B	—		14	7	—		—		—		14	7
Portuguesa	Total		15	3	14	7	—		—		—		29	10
Palmeiras	2014	Série A	33	16	—		6	2	—		—		39	18
Cruzeiro	2015	Série A	5	0	3	1	—		3 (Note: Appearance(s) in Copa Libertadores)	0	—		11	1
Vitória de Guimarães B	2015–16	LigaPro	2	1	—		—		—		—		2	1
Vitória de Guimarães	2015–16	Primeira Liga	28	12	—		—		2 (Note: Appearance(s) in UEFA Europa League)	0	—		30	12
Fluminense	2016	Série A	12	2	—		2	0	—		—		14	2
Fluminense	2017	Série A	32	18	11	6	7	4	7 (Note: Appearance(s) in Copa Sudamericana)	4	2 (Note: Appearance(s) in Primeira Liga)	0	59	32
Fluminense	Total		44	20	11	6	9	4	7	4	2	0	73	34
Flamengo	2018	Série A	20	6	8	3	5	1	7 (Note: Appearance(s) in Copa Libertadores)	2	—		40	12
Flamengo	2019	Série A	0	0	3	2	0	0	0	0	0	0	3	2
Flamengo	Total		20	6	11	5	5	1	7	2	0	0	43	14
Henan Jianye	2019	Chinese Super League	1	1	—		0	0	—		—		1	1
Henan Jianye	2020	Chinese Super League	16	8	—		1	0	—		—		17	8
Henan Jianye	2021	Chinese Super League	20	8	—		3	1	—		—		23	9
Henan Jianye	2022	Chinese Super League	13	5	—		0	0	—		—		13	5
Henan Jianye	Total		50	22	—		4	1	—		—		54	23
Palmeiras (loan)	2019	Série A	4	0	—		—		—		—		4	0
Cruzeiro	2023	Série A	11	1	—		—		—		—		11	1
Chapecoense	2023	Série B	13	0	—		—		—		—		13	0
Portuguesa	2024	Paulista	—		11	1	—		—		—		11	1
Career total			256	92	157	56	23	8	19	6	21	3	478	159

== Honours ==
Individual

- Campeonato Brasileiro Série A top scorer: 2017
- Campeonato Brasileiro Série A Team of the year: 2017
