= Raphael Claus =

Brazilian football referee (born 1979)

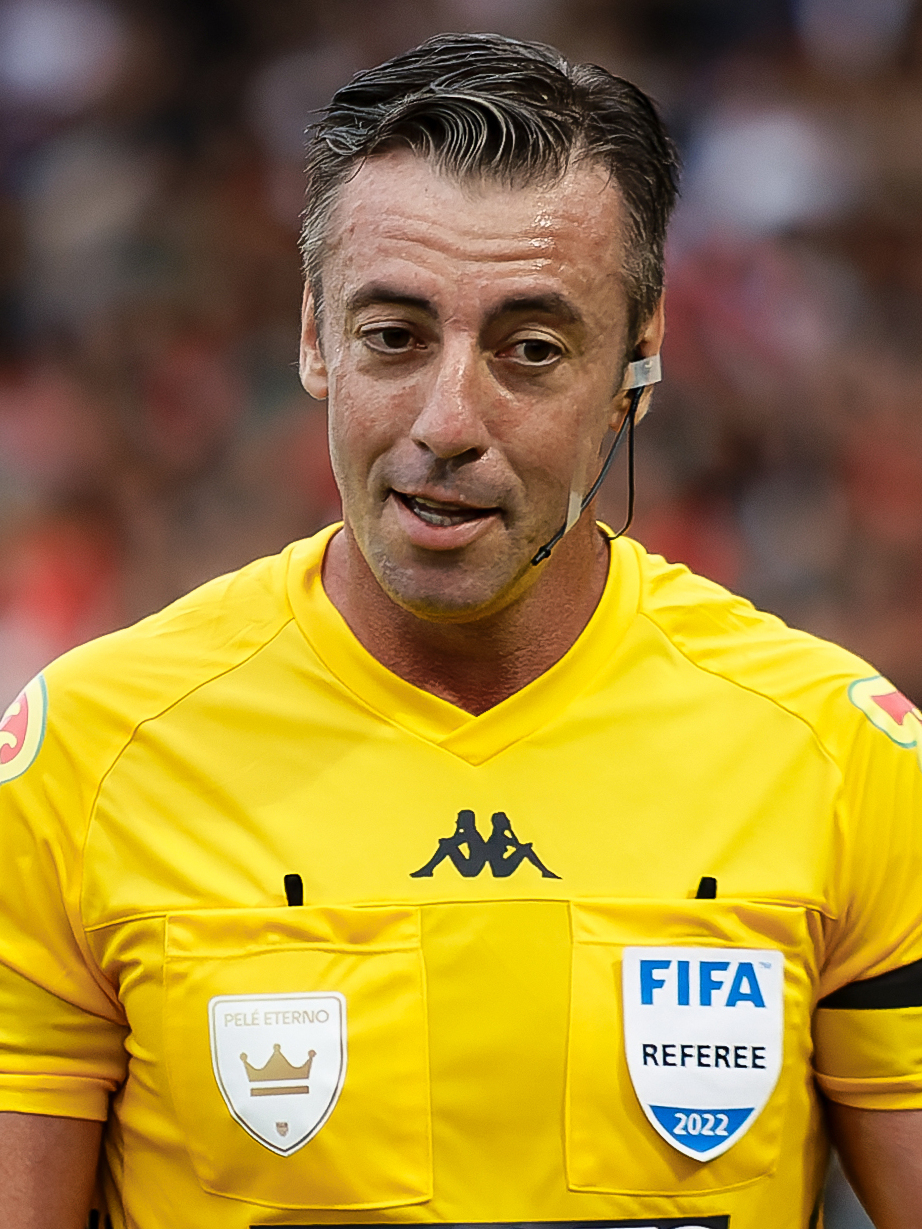
- Claus refereeing in 2023
- Born: 6 September 1979 (age 47); Santa Bárbara d'Oeste, São Paulo, Brazil

Domestic
Years	League	Role
2010–	FPF	Referee
2014–	CBF	Referee

International
Years	League	Role
2015–	FIFA	Referee

Raphael Claus (born 6 September 1979) is a Brazilian football referee. He was a referee for the 2022 FIFA World Cup in Qatar and the 2026 FIFA World Cup in North America.

== Early life ==
Claus was born in Santa Bárbara d'Oeste, São Paulo, Brazil. He was born to a family of professional athletes—including his father, Antônio Carlos Claus (who played for União Barbarense), and his brother, Niltinho Claus (a center-forward and top scorer for XV de Jaú during their 1995 promotion campaign, who also helped União Barbarense win promotion in 1998 and starred for Cúcuta Deportivo in Colombia). In 2002, he enrolled in the São Paulo Football Federation (FPF) referee training course, despite having no prior experience officiating amateur matches.

== Career ==
=== Early career ===
Claus started as a referee for the São Paulo Football Federation (FPF). In 2014 the Brazilian Football Confederation's (CBF) National Referees Commission nominated him to be listed on the FIFA table, which he has been since the beginning of 2015.

He served as the VAR official for the 2018 Copa Libertadores finals in Madrid, Spain, and for the 2019 Copa Libertadores semifinal match between River Plate and Boca Juniors. That same year, he officiated the Copa Sudamericana final between Colón and Independiente del Valle.

He officiated nine Paulistão finals: 2014, 2016, 2017, 2019, 2020, 2021, 2022, 2023, and 2024.

He refereed in several international competitions, such as the 2021 Copa América and the 2019 FIFA U-20 World Cup. He also refereed the 2024 Copa América final.

=== 2022 FIFA World Cup ===
He was one of the referees selected to represent the CBF and CONMEBOL at the 2022 FIFA World Cup, alongside Wilton Pereira Sampaio.

Claus took charge of two group stage matches at the 2022 FIFA World Cup in Qatar. He was the referee for the England's 6-2 win over Iran, and Morocco's 2-1 win over Canada.

=== 2023 match fixing allegations ===
In 2023, he was accused of match fixing by the owner of Brazilian football club Botafogo. The owner claimed that Claus was giving out "irregular red cards" and was taking bribes. Both FIFA and Brazilian authorities have found no evidence of wrongdoing by Claus.

=== 2026 FIFA World Cup ===
Claus officiated at the 2026 FIFA World Cup, representing CBF and CONMEBOL alongside Ramon Abatti Abel and Wilton Pereira Sampaio.

Claus was appointed a group stage match between Spain and Saudi Arabia and a round of 32 knockout match. In the knockout match between the United States and Bosnia and Herzegovina, Claus sent off Folarin Balogun with a red card after the VAR asked him to review the possible foul.

==== 2026 Trump–FIFA red card controversy ====
The day before the United States was set to play Belgium in the Round of 16, FIFA suspended the ban following a request by US president Donald Trump, who claimed that Claus was "very suspect". The Brazilian Football Confederation later issued a statement in defense of Claus and criticizing what they perceived as "insinuations that challenge Raphael Claus's integrity". The FIFA referee chairman, Pierluigi Collina also defended Claus by calling him a highly respected official who he has full confidence in.
