= Bruno Arrabal =

Brazilian footballer (born 1992)

Personal information
- Full name: Bruno Arrabal Passamani
- Date of birth: 22 February 1992 (age 34)
- Place of birth: Ouro Preto do Oeste, Brazil
- Height: 1.75 m (5 ft 9 in)
- Position: Midfielder

Team information
- Current team: Al-Hilal Benghazi

Youth career
- 2005–2007: Campo Grande-MS
- 2007: Paraná
- 2008–2009: Paranavaí
- 2009–2012: Atlético Sorocaba

Senior career*
Years	Team	Apps	(Gls)
2012	Atlético Sorocaba	0	(0)
2012	→ Vilhena (loan)	0	(0)
2013	Águia de Marabá	0	(0)
2013	Duque de Caxias	9	(0)
2014	Remo	0	(0)
2014	Duque de Caxias	15	(0)
2015	Portuguesa	0	(0)
2015	→ Tupi (loan)	7	(0)
2015–2017	Ethnikos Achna	52	(0)
2017–2019	Kamza	53	(0)
2019	Llapi	0	(0)
2019–2020	Burgan		
2020–2021	Arbëria	27	(0)
2021–2022	Drenica	13	(0)
- * Club domestic league appearances and goals as of 12:27, 2 October 2019 (UTC)

Bruno Arrabal Passamani (born 22 February 1992) is a Brazilian footballer who plays as a defensive midfielder for Kosovan club Al-Hilal Benghazi.

== Club career ==
Born in Ouro Preto do Oeste, Rondônia, Arrabal graduated with Atlético Sorocaba's youth setup, and made his senior debuts while on loan at Vilhena in 2012. In January 2013 he moved to Águia de Marabá, but was released in April, after appearing rarely.

On 28 June 2013 Arrabal joined Duque de Caxias, appearing regularly in Série C and in Copa Rio, as his side were crowned champions of the latter. On 10 January of the following year, he signed a four-month deal with Remo.

On 24 March 2014 Arrabal was released by Remo, and returned to Duque on 15 April. He appeared regularly for the club, which eventually suffered relegation.

In February 2015 Arrabal signed for Portuguesa, being immediately loaned to Tupi. He made his debut for the latter club on the 22nd, starting in a 1–0 away win against Democrata-GV for the Campeonato Mineiro championship.

On 26 May Arrabal joined Mogi Mirim in Série B, but left the club in June and subsequently signed for Cypriot club Ethnikos Achna FC.

On 30 November 2019 it was confirmed, that Arrabal had joined Kuwaiti club Burgan SC.

== Career statistics ==
(Correct as of 8 May 2015)

Club	Season	State League		League		Cup		Other		Total	
Club	Season	Apps	Goals	Apps	Goals	Apps	Goals	Apps	Goals	Apps	Goals
Vilhena	2012	3	1	1	0	—		—		4	1
Águia de Marabá	2013	1	0	—		—		—		1	0
Duque de Caxias	2013	—		9	0	—		2 (Note: Appearance(s) in Copa Rio)	0	11	0
Remo	2014	1	0	—		—		—		1	0
Duque de Caxias	2014	—		15	0	1	0	4	0	20	0
Tupi	2015	7	0	0	0	3	0	—		10	0
Ethnikos Achna	2015–16	—		0	0	0	0	0	0	0	0
Total		12	1	25	0	4	0	6	0	47	1
