= Marrone (footballer) =

Brazilian footballer

Personal information
- Full name: Glekson Marrone Pires Santos
- Date of birth: 15 September 1992 (age 34)
- Place of birth: Ouro Preto do Oeste, Brazil
- Height: 1.75 m (5 ft 9 in)
- Position: Left-back

Youth career
- Avaí

Senior career*
Years	Team	Apps	(Gls)
2012–2015	Avaí	32	(2)
2016	Volta Redonda	0	(0)
2016	ABC	10	(0)
2017	Capivariano	0	(0)
2017	Brusque	0	(0)
2017	Tombense	8	(0)
2018	Hercílio Luz	0	(0)
2019	ASA	0	(0)
2020	Cascavel CR	0	(0)
- * Club domestic league appearances and goals as of 9 April 2019

Glekson Marrone Pires Santos (born 15 September 1992), known as Marrone, is a Brazilian footballer. Mainly a left-back, he can also play as a defensive midfielder.

== Career ==
Born in Ouro Preto do Oeste, Rondônia, Marrone graduated with Avaí's youth setup. He made his professional debut on 24 November 2012, coming on as a second-half substitute in a 1–1 home draw against Criciúma for the Série B championship.

After rejecting a loan deal to Marcílio Dias, Marrone was made a starter by manager Geninho in 2014, being successfully converted to a left-back. He scored his first professional goal on 10 September 2014, netting the third in a 4–1 away win against Bragantino.

Marrone appeared in 23 matches and scored two goals during the campaign, also winning promotion to Série A.
