= Bruno Cardoso =

Brazilian footballer (born 1984)

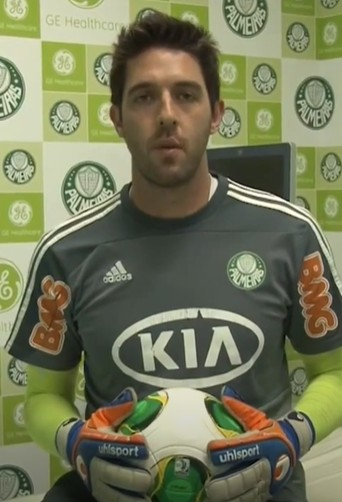

Personal information
- Full name: Bruno Cortez Cardoso
- Date of birth: June 27, 1984 (age 42)
- Place of birth: São Paulo, Brazil
- Height: 1.95 m (6 ft 5 in)
- Position: Goalkeeper

Youth career
- 1997–2004: Palmeiras

Senior career*
Years	Team	Apps	(Gls)
2004	Palmeiras B	0	(0)
2005–2015	Palmeiras	70	(0)
2011	→ Portuguesa (loan)	0	(0)
2015	→ Santa Cruz (loan)	4	(0)
2016	Fort Lauderdale Strikers	4	(0)
- * Club domestic league appearances and goals as of 29 May 2023

Bruno Cortez Cardoso (born June 27, 1984), is a Brazilian former professional footballer who played as a goalkeeper.

== Club career ==
Palmeiras fan since childhood, the player joined the club in 1997 at the age of 13. Bruno went through all the Palmeiras youth categories, including the B team. In 2000, the goalkeeper was called up to the Brazilian youth national team. Among his main titles as a junior player, he highlights the conquest of the BH Cup in 2002 and the Paulista Championships in 2002 and 2004, as well as being part of the team that was the runner-up in the Copa São Paulo de Futebol Júnior.

In 2002, Bruno started training with the professional squad and occupied the position of the third goalkeeper in the group that became the champion of the 2008 Campeonato Paulista, with Diego Cavalieri in second place and Palmeiras idol Marcos in first place.

In July 2008, with Diego Cavalieri's transfer to Liverpool, he rose to the position of second goalkeeper and assumed the number 1 jersey in the team. In the first team, Bruno made his debut during the 3-1 defeat against Vasco da Gama on August 13, 2008, at Estádio São Januário, during the Copa Sudamericana.

On June 10, 2011, it was announced that he would join Portuguesa on loan. At Portuguesa, which became the champion of the Série B that year and was even nicknamed "Barcelusa" by the press, Bruno shared the goalkeeper position with Weverton (who would later become a Palmeiras idol), but ended up not playing in any games and returned to Palmeiras at the end of that season.

In 2012, after Palmeiras' participation in the Campeonato Paulista, Bruno became the team's starting goalkeeper, replacing goalkeeper Deola. He played a crucial role in Palmeiras' undefeated conquest of the 2012 Copa do Brasil, becoming the best goalkeeper of the competition. However, in the same year, he was the starting goalkeeper in the campaign that relegated Palmeiras to the Série B of the Campeonato Brasileiro.

After Palmeiras' relegation in 2012, Bruno lost his position as the team's starting goalkeeper. With the arrival of Fernando Prass, he spent most of 2013 on the bench. In the first half of the year, in the round of 16 of the 2013 Copa Libertadores, he had a great chance to regain his starting position after Prass suffered a serious injury, but he was considered one of the main responsible for Palmeiras' elimination after a mistake against Tijuana. In the second half of the year, he was used sparingly during the conquest of the Série B championship that brought Palmeiras back to the top division of the Campeonato Brasileiro. Nevertheless, the club renewed the goalkeeper's contract until December 2015 in January 2014.

In 2015, in his final year of contract with Palmeiras, Bruno was loaned to Santa Cruz until the end of the year. At the end of the season, the contract was not renewed by either party, and Bruno became a free agent.

On January 1, 2016, Bruno signed a two-year contract and was announced as a goalkeeper for Fort Lauderdale Strikers, competing in the NASL. However, in the same year, the Strikers began experiencing financial problems and failed to pay the players' salaries properly. In September 2016, Paulo Cesso, one of the team's owners, notified the NASL that they could not honor their financial commitments for the Strikers. As a result, the team ceased operations at the end of 2016, leaving the players stuck with valid contracts, unable to play professionally for other teams, and with unresolved financial issues with the players. Bruno did not play professionally for another team after that.

== Post-playing career ==
With Fort Lauderdale Strikers going through a process that resulted in their bankruptcy, Bruno, who had already graduated in Physical Education during his time at Palmeiras, chose to continue investing in his professional development. At the end of 2017, he obtained certification in the B license for coaches (US Soccer B License), offered by the North American federation.

Between 2019 and 2020, Bruno worked as a commentator on the DAZN channel.

In 2022, Bruno Cardoso was hired as a goalkeeper coach in the youth categories of the Chicago Fire, specifically in the Chicago Fire Academy, where he currently remains.

== Honours ==
Palmeiras

- São Paulo State Championship: 2008
- Copa do Brasil: 2012
- Campeonato Brasileiro Série B: 2013

Portuguesa

- Campeonato Brasileiro Série B: 2011

Santa Cruz

- Campeonato Pernambucano: 2015

Individual

- Copa do Brasil's Best Goalkeeper: 2012
