= Guarú =

Brazilian footballer (born 1981)

Personal information
- Full name: Rodrigo Neves de Freitas
- Date of birth: 4 February 1981 (age 45)
- Place of birth: Taubaté, Brazil
- Height: 1.70 m (5 ft 7 in)
- Position: Midfielder

Senior career*
Years	Team	Apps	(Gls)
1999–2001	Guarani		
2002	Inter de Limeira		
2003	União São João		
2003	CRAC		
2003	Inter de Limeira		
2004	Fortaleza		
2004	CRAC		
2005	Fortaleza		
2005	Bahia		
2006	Paulista		
2006	Coritiba		
2006–2007	Al-Hilal		
2008	Grêmio Barueri		
2009	Guaratinguetá		
2009	América–RN		
2010	Linense		
2010	Guaratinguetá		
2011	Linense		
2012	Anapolina		
2012–2013	Penapolense		
2013	Fortaleza		
2014	Penapolense		
2015	Rio Claro		
2015	Botafogo–SP		
2016	Água Santa		
2016	São Bento		
- * Club domestic league appearances and goals as of 27 January 2017

Rodrigo Neves de Freitas (born February 4, 1981), known as Guarú, is a Brazilian footballer who plays as midfielder.

== Career statistics ==
As of 27 January 2017

Club	Season	League			State League		Cup		Conmebol		Other		Total	
Club	Season	Division	Apps	Goals	Apps	Goals	Apps	Goals	Apps	Goals	Apps	Goals	Apps	Goals
Guaratinguetá	2009	Paulista	—		8	0	—		—		—		8	0
América–RN	2009	Série B	21	2	—		—		—		—		21	2
Linense	2010	Paulista A2	—		16	1	—		—		—		16	1
Guaratinguetá	2010	Série B	16	1	—		—		—		—		16	1
Linense	2011	Paulista	—		7	0	—		—		—		7	0
Anapolina	2012	Série C	—		7	1	—		—		—		7	1
Penapolense	2012	Paulista A2	—		13	5	—		—		18 (Note: All appearance(s) in Copa Paulista)	9	31	14
Penapolense	2013	Paulista	—		20	10	—		—		—		20	10
Penapolense	Subtotal		—		33	15	—		—		18	9	51	24
Fortaleza	2013	Série C	18	6	—		3	1	—		—		21	7
Penapolense	2014	Série D	8	2	14	3	—		—		—		22	5
Rio Claro	2015	Paulista	—		15	3	—		—		—		15	3
Botafogo–SP	2015	Série D	8	0	—		—		—		—		8	0
Água Santa	2016	Paulista	—		4	1	—		—		—		4	1
São Bento	2016	Série D	3	0	—		—		—		—		3	0
Career total			74	11	104	24	3	1	0	0	18	9	199	45
