= 2014 Campeonato Paulista =

Campeonato Paulista - Série A1
- Season: 2014
- Dates: January 18 – April 13, 2014
- Teams: 20
- Champions: Ituano
- Relegated: Comercial; Oeste; Atlético Sorocaba; Paulista
- Série D: Ituano; Penapolense
- Matches: 157
- Goals: 421 (2.68 per match)
- Top goalscorer: Alan Kardec; Cícero; Léo Costa; Luís Fabiano (9 goals each)
- Biggest home win: Santos 5–0 Bragantino (27 February)
- Biggest away win: Linense 0–4 Corinthians (5 March); Ponte Preta 0–4 Mogi Mirim (23 March)
- Highest scoring: São Bernardo 5–5 Rio Claro (5 March)

The 2014 Campeonato Paulista de Futebol Profissional da Primeira Divisão - Série A1 (officially the 2014 Paulistão Chevrolet for sponsorship reasons) was the 113th season of São Paulo's top professional football league. Ituano became the champions.

== Format ==
- In the first stage the twenty teams are drawn, with seeding, into four groups of five teams each, with each team playing once against the fifteen clubs from the other three groups. After each team has played fifteen matches, the top two teams of each group qualify for the quarter-final stage.
- After the completion of the first stage, the four clubs with the lowest number of points, regardless of the group, will be relegated to the Campeonato Paulista Série A2.
- If all four clubs with the lowest number of points are from the same group, the best third-placed club from the other groups will qualify for the quarter-final stage.

=== Tiebreakers ===
The teams are ranked according to points (3 points for a win, 1 point for a draw, 0 points for a loss). If two or more teams are equal on points on completion of the group matches, the following criteria are applied to determine the rankings:

1. Higher number of points obtained;
2. Superior goal difference;
3. Higher number of goals scored;
4. Fewest red cards received;
5. Fewest yellow cards received;
6. Draw in the headquarters of the FPF.

== Teams ==
Club	Home city	2013 result
Atlético Sorocaba	Sorocaba	15th
Botafogo	Ribeirão Preto	7th
Bragantino	Bragança Paulista	11th
Corinthians	São Paulo (Tatuapé)	1st
Comercial	Ribeirão Preto	4th (Série A2)
Audax	Osasco	3rd (Série A2)
Ituano	Itu	14th
Linense	Lins	9th
Mogi Mirim	Mogi Mirim	4th
Oeste	Itápolis	16th
Palmeiras	São Paulo (Perdizes)	6th
Paulista	Jundiaí	13th
Penapolense	Penápolis	8th
Ponte Preta	Campinas	5th
Portuguesa	São Paulo (Pari)	1st (Série A2)
Rio Claro	Rio Claro	2nd (Série A2)
Santos	Santos	2nd
São Bernardo	São Bernardo do Campo	12th
São Paulo	São Paulo (Morumbi)	3rd
XV de Piracicaba	Piracicaba	10th

Source: Futebol Paulista

== First stage ==
Key to colours in group tables
Group winners and runners-up advance to the quarter-finals

=== Group A ===
Pos	Team	Pld	W	D	L	GF	GA	GD	Pts
1	São Paulo	15	8	3	4	28	15	+13	27
2	Penapolense	15	6	1	8	14	17	−3	19
3	Linense	15	5	1	9	9	21	−12	16
4	Comercial	15	3	3	9	13	21	−8	12
5	Atlético Sorocaba	15	2	5	8	16	29	−13	11

=== Group B ===
Pos	Team	Pld	W	D	L	GF	GA	GD	Pts
1	Botafogo	15	9	1	5	23	20	+3	28
2	Ituano	15	8	4	3	16	10	+6	28
3	Corinthians	15	7	3	5	24	19	+5	24
4	Audax	15	6	5	4	17	15	+2	23
5	XV de Piracicaba	15	5	4	6	18	18	0	19

=== Group C ===
Pos	Team	Pld	W	D	L	GF	GA	GD	Pts
1	Santos	15	11	3	1	39	16	+23	36
2	Ponte Preta	15	8	0	7	17	23	−6	24
3	São Bernardo	15	6	5	4	23	18	+5	23
4	Portuguesa	15	6	2	7	23	19	+4	20
5	Paulista	15	0	4	11	14	31	−17	4

Source: Globo Esporte

=== Group D ===
Pos	Team	Pld	W	D	L	GF	GA	GD	Pts
1	Palmeiras	15	11	2	2	27	13	+14	35
2	Bragantino	15	7	2	6	17	18	−1	23
3	Rio Claro	15	5	5	5	29	27	+2	20
4	Mogi Mirim	15	4	5	6	25	30	−5	17
5	Oeste	15	3	2	10	16	28	−12	11

== Knockout stage ==
=== Bracket ===
Quarterfinals
C1	Santos	4
C2	Ponte Preta	0
A1	São Paulo	0 (4)
A2	Penapolense (p)	0 (5)
D1	Palmeiras	2
D2	Bragantino	0
B1	Botafogo–SP	0 (1)
B2	Ituano (p)	0 (4)

Semifinals
C1	Santos	3
A2	Penapolense	2
D1	Palmeiras	0
B2	Ituano	1

Finals
C1	Santos	0	1	1 (6)
B2	Ituano (p)	1	0	1 (7)

== Final standings ==
Pos	Team	Pld	W	D	L	GF	GA	GD	Pts	Qualification or relegation
1	Ituano	19	10	5	4	18	11	+7	35	Champion
2	Santos	19	14	3	2	47	19	+28	45	Runner-up
3	Palmeiras	17	12	2	3	29	14	+15	38	Eliminated in Semifinals
4	Penapolense	17	6	2	9	16	20	−4	20	Eliminated in Semifinals
5	Botafogo	16	9	2	5	23	20	+3	29	Eliminated in Quarterfinals
6	São Paulo	16	8	4	4	28	15	+13	28	Eliminated in Quarterfinals
7	Ponte Preta	16	8	0	8	17	27	−10	24	Eliminated in Quarterfinals
8	Bragantino	16	7	2	7	17	20	−3	23	Eliminated in Quarterfinals
9	Corinthians	15	7	3	5	24	19	+5	24	Eliminated in the group stage
10	São Bernardo	15	6	5	4	23	18	+5	23	Eliminated in the group stage
11	Audax	15	6	5	4	17	15	+2	23	Eliminated in the group stage
12	Portuguesa	15	6	2	7	23	19	+4	20	Eliminated in the group stage
13	Rio Claro	15	5	5	5	29	27	+2	20	Eliminated in the group stage
14	XV de Piracicaba	15	5	4	6	18	18	0	19	Eliminated in the group stage
15	Mogi Mirim	15	5	1	9	25	30	−5	16	Eliminated in the group stage
16	Linense	15	5	1	9	9	21	−12	16	Eliminated in the group stage
17	Comercial	15	2	5	8	13	27	−14	11	Relegation to 2015 Campeonato Paulista Série A2
18	Oeste	15	3	2	10	16	28	−12	11	Relegation to 2015 Campeonato Paulista Série A2
19	Atlético Sorocaba	15	2	5	8	16	29	−13	11	Relegation to 2015 Campeonato Paulista Série A2
20	Paulista	15	0	4	11	14	31	−17	4	Relegation to 2015 Campeonato Paulista Série A2

Updated to match(es) played on March 30, 2014. Source: Soccerway.com
Rules for classification: 1st points; 2nd wins; 3rd goal difference; 4th goals scored; 5th head-to-head results; 6th least red cards received; 7th least yellow cards received; 8th draw.

== Awards ==
=== Team of the year ===
Pos.	Player	Club
GK	(Brazil) Fernando Prass	Palmeiras
DF	(Brazil) Cicinho	Santos
DF	(Brazil) Anderson Salles	Ituano
DF	(Brazil) Lúcio	Palmeiras
DF	(Uruguay) Álvaro Pereira	São Paulo
MF	(Brazil) Arouca	Santos
MF	(Brazil) Hudson	Botafogo
MF	(Brazil) Cícero	Santos
FW	(Brazil) Geuvânio	Santos
FW	(Brazil) Thiago Ribeiro	Santos
FW	(Brazil) Alan Kardec	Palmeiras

Source Globo Esporte
Last updated: 9 April 2014

Player of the Season

The Player of the Year was awarded to Cícero Santos.

Young Player of the Season

The Young Player of the Year was awarded to Geuvânio.

Countryside Best Player of the Season

The Countryside Best Player of the Year was awarded to Léo Costa.

Top scorer of the Season

The top scorer of the season – TBD.
