= Wellington (footballer, born September 1991) =

Brazilian footballer

Personal information
- Full name: Wellington da Silva Pinto
- Date of birth: 30 September 1991 (age 35)
- Place of birth: Bauru, Brazil
- Height: 1.88 m (6 ft 2 in)
- Position: Centre-back

Team information
- Current team: Gama

Youth career
- 2008–2011: Palmeiras

Senior career*
Years	Team	Apps	(Gls)
2012–2017	Palmeiras	23	(0)
2013	→ Atlético Sorocaba (loan)	14	(1)
2013	→ ASA (loan)	8	(0)
2015	→ Atlético Paranaense (loan)	8	(0)
2016	→ Ponte Preta (loan)	1	(0)
2016	→ Santa Cruz (loan)	7	(0)
2017	→ Mirassol (loan)	9	(2)
2018	Mirassol	12	(0)
2018–2020	Oliveirense	38	(1)
2020	Mirassol	2	(0)
2020	→ Juventude (loan)	28	(0)
2021	CSA	7	(1)
2022	Náutico	16	(1)
2023	Inter de Limeira	3	(0)
2023	Athletic	2	(0)
2024	Gama	9	(0)
2024	Água Santa	3	(0)
2025–	Gama	28	(1)
- * Club domestic league appearances and goals as of 19 November 2026

Wellington da Silva Pinto (born 30 September 1991 in Bauru), simply known as Wellington, is a Brazilian professional footballer who plays as a centre-back. Currently plays for Série D club Gama.

== Career ==
He was promoted to the main cast from Palmeiras, after good performances in the Copa São Paulo.

== Honours ==
CSA

- Campeonato Alagoano: 2021
