= Jackson Caucaia =

Brazilian footballer

Personal information
- Full name: Francisco Jackson Menezes da Costa
- Date of birth: 21 May 1987 (age 39)
- Place of birth: Caucaia, Brazil
- Height: 1.77 m (5 ft 9 1/2 in)
- Position: Defensive midfielder

Team information
- Current team: Audax Rio

Senior career*
| Years | Team | Apps | (Gls) |
| 2008 | Caucaia | | |
| 2009 | Horizonte | | |
| 2009 | Tiradentes-CE | | |
| 2009 | Caucaia | | |
| 2010 | Horizonte | 0 | (0) |
| 2010–2012 | Atlético Mineiro | 5 | (0) |
| 2012 | → Fortaleza (loan) | 8 | (1) |
| 2013 | Fortaleza | 18 | (4) |
| 2014–2015 | Ituano | 3 | (1) |
| 2014 | → Bragantino (loan) | 1 | (0) |
| 2015 | → Vasco da Gama (loan) | 3 | (0) |
| 2015 | Náutico | 10 | (0) |
| 2016 | Figueirense | 13 | (0) |
| 2017 | Ceará | 15 | (0) |
| 2019 | ABC | 1 | (0) |
| 2019 | Ferroviário | 0 | (0) |
| 2019 | Caucaia | 8 | (0) |
| 2020 | Barretos | 0 | (0) |
| 2020 | Tiradentes | 2 | (0) |
| 2020–2021 | Caucaia | 26 | (0) |
| 2023 | Audax Rio | 7 | (0) |
| 2023 | Caucaia | 4 | (0) |
| 2024– | Audax Rio | 1 | (0) |
- * Club domestic league appearances and goals as of 17 January 2024

Francisco da Costa Menezes Jackson (born 21 January 1987), known as Jackson Caucaia, is a Brazilian footballer who plays for Audax Rio, as a defensive midfielder.

== Honours ==
Ceará

- Campeonato Cearense: 2017

Ituano

- Campeonato Paulista: 2014

Horizonte

- Copa Fares Lopes: 2010

Caucaia

- Copa Fares Lopes: 2019
- Campeonato Cearense Série C: 2009
