= Renato Augusto (footballer, born 1992) =

Brazilian footballer

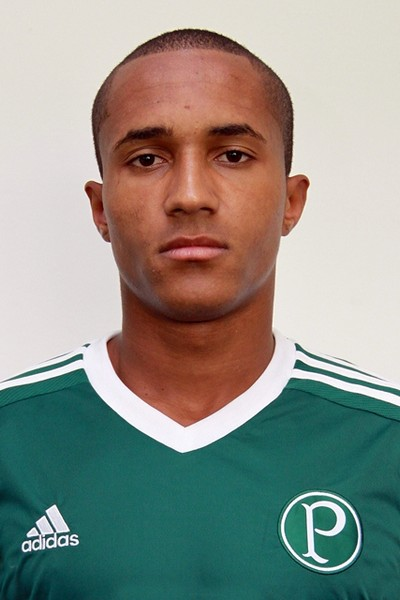
- Renato Augusto in 2012.

Personal information
- Full name: Renato Augusto Santos Júnior
- Date of birth: 29 January 1992 (age 34)
- Place of birth: Caieiras, Brazil
- Height: 1.85 m (6 ft 1 in)
- Position: Defensive midfielder

Team information
- Current team: Ventforet Kofu
- Number: 21

Youth career
- 2011–2012: Palmeiras

Senior career*
Years	Team	Apps	(Gls)
2012–2018	Palmeiras	27	(1)
2012–2013	→ Moreirense (loan)	21	(3)
2015	→ Joinville (loan)	2	(0)
2016	→ Ponte Preta (loan)	0	(0)
2016	→ Figueirense (loan)	14	(0)
2017–2018	→ Paysandu (loan)	61	(5)
2019–2023	Shimizu S-Pulse	6	(0)
2024–	Ventforet Kofu	26	(0)
- * Club domestic league appearances and goals as of 1 January 2026

Renato Augusto Santos Júnior (born 29 January 1992 in Caieiras) is a Brazilian footballer who plays as a defensive midfielder for Ventforet Kofu in the J2 League.

== Honours ==
Palmeiras

- Campeonato Brasileiro Série B: 2013
