= Édson (footballer, born 1985) =

Brazilian footballer

Personal information
- Full name: Édson Pereira Lisboa
- Date of birth: 24 September 1985 (age 41)
- Place of birth: Unaí, Brazil
- Height: 1.89 m (6 ft 2 in)
- Position: Goalkeeper

Youth career
- 2002–2004: Atlético Mineiro

Senior career*
Years	Team	Apps	(Gls)
2005–2009	Atlético Mineiro	1	(0)
2009–2011	Atlético Goianiense	4	(0)
2011	Atlético Paranaense	0	(0)
2011	Itumbiara	1	(0)
2012–2014	Goiás	6	(0)
2015–2016	Vila Nova	32	(0)
2016–2019	ABC	63	(0)
2020	Aparecidense	0	(0)
- * Club domestic league appearances and goals

Edson Pereira Lisboa (born 24 September 1985) is a Brazilian former professional footballer who played as a goalkeeper.

== Career ==
Edson was born in Unai. He became a professional with Atlético Mineiro in 2002, then winning the Série B and the Campeonato Mineiro.

In the core team, Edson had little chance as the owner even being booed by the crowd in their poor performances in 2007. In early 2008 with an injury of the holder Juninho Edson had some chances but could not take advantage of them.

With the consecutive failures in the Brazilian Championship and State Championship of the then holder Juninho Edson won another chance in the team's Athletic in July 2008, having a good run of games. With very few chances in the team in 2009, Edson had one chance as a starter in the Brasileirão 2009, the match between Atletico and Avai, stadium Mineirao on 20 August 2009, valid for 20th. championship round. The home team won the game by 2 x 0 to the middle of the second half, but Edson, who had executed some fine saves during the remainder of the game, ended up taking two gois: first, a beautiful shot the angle of Eltinho indefensible, the second a late departure and disastrous for 46min into the second half that was to take the three points of Atletico are virtually guaranteed to return home and the G4 - the classification zone for the 2010 Libertadores. With the pressure of the crowd after a draw in the choir and various insults to the goalkeeper, the weather was unbearable one of the reasons that made the football and athletic chose to amicably terminate the contract on 1 September 2009.

On 2 September 2009 was presented as further reinforcement of Atlético Goianense. Where is the immediate booking of Márcio.

On 15 March, he signed a one-year contract with Atlético Paranaense.

== Honours ==
Atlético Mineiro

- Campeonato Brasileiro Série B: 2006
- Campeonato Mineiro: 2007

Atlético Goianiense

- Campeonato Goiano: 2010

Goiás

- Campeonato Goiano: 2012 and 2013
- Campeonato Brasileiro - Série B: 2012

Vila Nova

- Campeonato Goiano - Segunda Divisão: 2015
- Campeonato Brasileiro - Série C: 2015

ABC

- Copa RN: 2017
- Campeonato Potiguar: 2017
