= França (footballer, born 1991) =

Brazilian footballer

Personal information
- Full name: Welington Wildy Muniz dos Santos
- Date of birth: 21 April 1991 (age 35)
- Place of birth: Bauru, Brazil
- Height: 1.81 m (5 ft 11 in)
- Position: Defensive midfielder

Team information
- Current team: Noroeste

Youth career
- –2010: Noroeste

Senior career*
Years	Team	Apps	(Gls)
2010–2012	Noroeste	0	(0)
2012	Coritiba	4	(0)
2012	Criciúma	10	(1)
2013–2014	Hannover 96	0	(0)
2014	→ Palmeiras (loan)	0	(0)
2014	→ Figueirense (loan)	15	(1)
2015–2016	Figueirense	33	(3)
2016–2017	Londrina	8	(0)
2017	→ Remo (loan)	6	(0)
2018	Brusque	0	(0)
2018	Boa Esporte	3	(0)
2019	Inter de Limeira	0	(0)
2019	Londrina	2	(0)
2020–	Noroeste	0	(0)
- * Club domestic league appearances and goals as of 21:18, 25 April 2020 (UTC)

Welington Wildy Muniz dos Santos (born 21 April 1991 in Bauru, São Paulo), commonly known as França, is a Brazilian footballer who plays as a defensive midfielder for Noroeste.

França played with Coritiba, Criciúma and Noroeste before making his debut in Campeonato Brasileiro Série A with Figueirense FC.
