= Ouro Preto do Oeste =

Municipality in Rondônia, Brazil

- Municipality
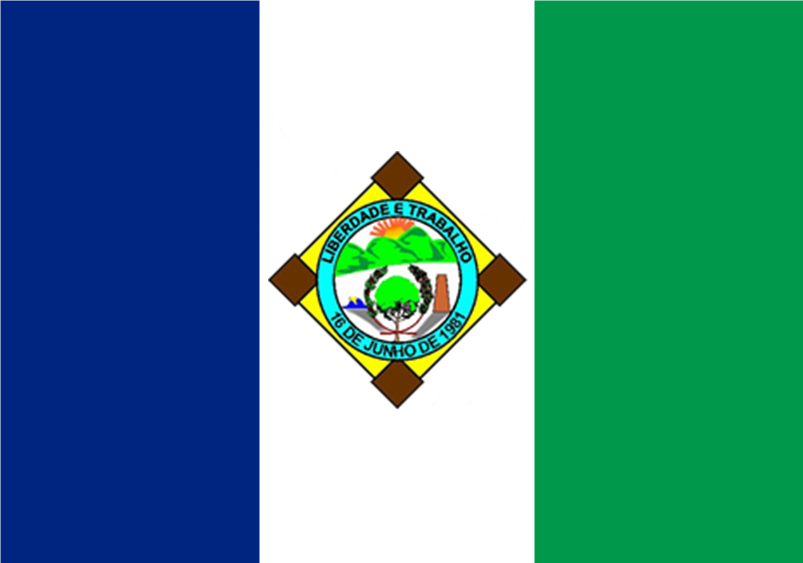
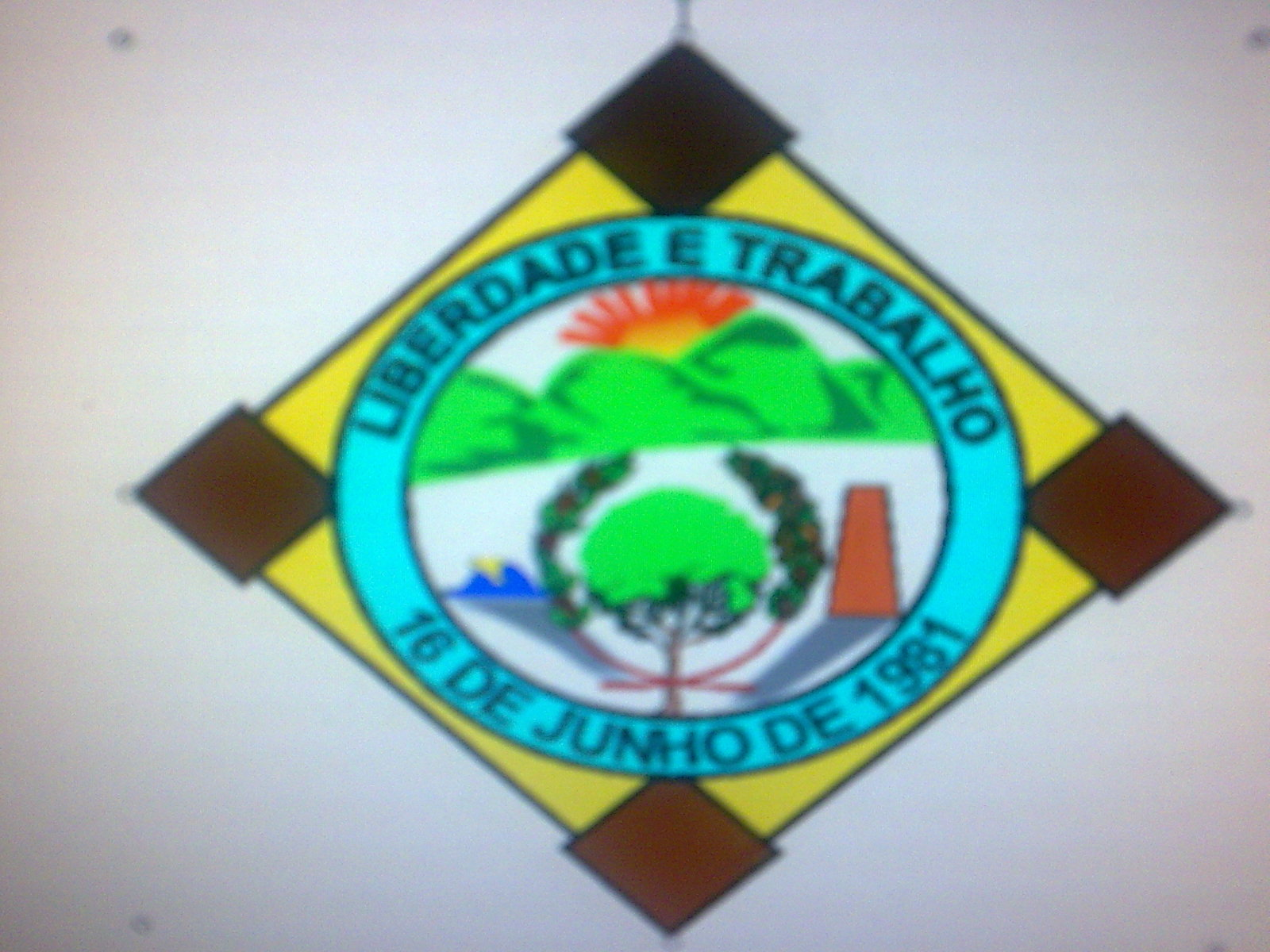
- Flag Coat of arms

- Location in Rondônia state

- Location in Brazil
- Coordinates: 10°44′53″S 62°12′57″W
- Country: Brazil
- Region: North
- State: Rondônia

Area
  - Total: 1,970 km^{2} (760 sq mi)

Population (2020)
  - Total: 35,737
  - Density: 18.1/km^{2} (47.0/sq mi)
- Time zone: UTC−4 (AMT)

Ouro Preto do Oeste is a municipality located in the Brazilian state of Rondônia. Its population was 35,737 (2020) and its area is 1,970 km^{2}.

== See also ==
- List of municipalities in Rondônia
