= Alan Kardec =

Brazilian footballer (born 1989)

Personal information
- Full name: Alan Kardec de Souza Pereira Júnior
- Date of birth: January 12, 1989 (age 37)
- Place of birth: Barra Mansa, Rio de Janeiro, Brazil
- Height: 1.87 m (6 ft 2 in)
- Position: Striker

Team information
- Current team: Juventude
- Number: 9

Youth career
- 2000–2006: Vasco da Gama

Senior career*
| Years | Team | Apps | (Gls) |
| 2006–2009 | Vasco da Gama | 73 | (18) |
| 2009 | → Internacional (loan) | 2 | (0) |
| 2009–2014 | Benfica | 23 | (3) |
| 2011–2012 | → Santos (loan) | 51 | (9) |
| 2012–2013 | Benfica B | 9 | (4) |
| 2013–2014 | → Palmeiras (loan) | 43 | (24) |
| 2014–2016 | São Paulo | 71 | (23) |
| 2016–2020 | Chongqing Lifan | 106 | (55) |
| 2021–2022 | Shenzhen FC | 16 | (11) |
| 2022–2024 | Atlético Mineiro | 47 | (3) |
| 2025 | Athletico Paranaense | 33 | (9) |
| 2026– | Juventude | 29 | (4) |

International career
| 2009 | Brazil U20 | 15 | (6) |
- * Club domestic league appearances and goals as of 17 November 2026

Alan Kardec de Souza Pereira Júnior (born January 12, 1989), known as Alan Kardec, is a Brazilian professional football player who plays as a striker for Juventude.

He is named after the systematizer of Spiritism, Allan Kardec.

== Club career ==
=== Vasco da Gama ===
Alan Kardec debuted for CR Vasco da Gama on 14 February 2007 in Manaus, in a 2–1 victory over Fast Clube in the Copa do Brasil. On 11 April 11, he scored his first goal for Vasco when his club and Botafogo drew 4–4 in a Campeonato Carioca match. On 21 July 2007, he scored his first Série A goal when Vasco beat Atlético Mineiro 4–0. He played 26 Série A matches and scored eight goals in 2007, while in 2008, he played 19 matches and scored two goals in that competition.

=== Internacional ===
On 1 September 2009, Alan Kardec was loaned to Internacional. He played his first game as an Internacional player on 28 October, a Série A game against São Paulo at Estádio do Morumbi, in which he came as a substitute for Fabiano Eller.

=== Benfica ===
Alan Kardec announced on 13 December 2009 that he would play for Benfica in the 2010 season after Vasco had accepted a €2.5 million bid from the Portuguese club. The following week, he signed a personal contract with Benfica. On 18 March 2010, he scored the winning goal in Benfica's UEFA Europa League match against Marseille with a ferocious strike from a hard angle.

=== Santos ===
In July 2011, was confirmed that Alan Kardec would be loaned for one season to Santos. Santos attempt to renew the loan in July 2012, but Benfica denied, only allowing the player to leave on a permanent deal. Alan Kardec played occasionally for Benfica's B-team, as he was effectively blocked in the first team by strikers Óscar Cardozo, Lima and Rodrigo.

=== Palmeiras ===
In June 2013, Brazilian side Palmeiras confirmed the loan deal of Alan Kardec for one-and-half-years from Benfica, with an option to make the move permanent. Kardec came back to Brazil as a substitute for Kléber, who had a bad streak for the São Paulo city based club.

In 2014, Alan Kardec had a great start to the year, scoring against São Paulo and Corinthians, two of Palmeiras' biggest rivals.

=== São Paulo ===
Alan Kardec signed a five-year deal with São Paulo on 12 May 2014, with the club paying €4.5 million to Benfica.

=== Chongqing Lifan ===
On 15 July 2016, São Paulo announced that they had reached an agreement with Chinese club Chongqing Lifan for the transfer of Alan Kardec, for a fee of €5 million. On 1 November 2020, after scoring in a 2–0 win over Shandong Luneng, Alan Kardec became the top scorer in the history of Chongqing Lifan, with 56 goals.

=== Shenzhen FC ===
Alan Kardec spent the 2021 season with Shenzhen FC, scoring 12 goals in 19 appearances.

=== Atlético Mineiro ===
On 24 June 2022, Alan Kardec joined Atlético Mineiro on a free transfer.

== International career ==
Alan Kardec played eight South American Youth Championship matches for the Brazilian under-20 team between January 20, 2009, and February 8, scoring two goals against Uruguay and Argentina respectively. He scored two goals in Brazil's first 2009 FIFA U-20 World Cup game, played on September 27, 2009, against Costa Rica. He also scored a goal in the round of 16, against Uruguay, played on 7 October 2009, and the only goal of the semi-final, against Costa Rica, played on 13 October 2009. In the final against Ghana on 16 October 2009, he scored the first penalty kick of the shoot-out after a goalless draw. Brazil lost the match 3–4 on penalties.

He was one of seven players put on standby for Brazil's 2014 FIFA World Cup team.

In July 2021, it was revealed that the China national football team were attempting to naturalize him. He would be eligible to represent China PR from January 2022.

== Career statistics ==
As of match played 15 December 2024

Appearances and goals by club, season and competition
| Club | Season | League | | | State League | | National Cup | | League Cup | | Continental | | Other | | Total | |
| Club | Season | Division | Apps | Goals | Apps | Goals | Apps | Goals | Apps | Goals | Apps | Goals | Apps | Goals | Apps | Goals |
|---|---|---|---|---|---|---|---|---|---|---|---|---|---|---|---|---|
| Vasco da Gama | 2007 | Série A | 26 | 8 | 1 (Note: Appearance(s) in Campeonato Carioca) | 1 | 1 | 0 | — | | 5 (Note: Appearance(s) in Copa Sudamericana) | 0 | — | | 33 | 9 |
| Vasco da Gama | 2008 | Série A | 19 | 2 | 17 | 6 | 5 | 3 | — | | 2 | 1 | — | | 43 | 12 |
| Vasco da Gama | 2009 | Série B | 6 | 0 | 4 | 1 | 4 | 1 | — | | — | | — | | 14 | 2 |
| Vasco da Gama | Total | | 51 | 10 | 22 | 8 | 10 | 4 | — | | 7 | 1 | — | | 90 | 23 |
| Internacional (loan) | 2009 | Série A | 2 | 0 | — | | — | | — | | 0 | 0 | — | | 2 | 0 |
| Benfica | 2009–10 | Primeira Liga | 8 | 0 | — | | 0 | 0 | 3 | 0 | 2 (Note: Appearance(s) in UEFA Europa League) | 1 | — | | 13 | 1 |
| Benfica | 2010–11 | Primeira Liga | 12 | 3 | — | | 3 | 2 | 3 | 0 | 7 (Note: Four appearances and one goal in UEFA Champions League, three appearances in UEFA Europa League) | 1 | 0 | 0 | 25 | 6 |
| Benfica | 2012–13 | Primeira Liga | 3 | 0 | — | | 1 | 0 | 2 | 1 | 0 | 0 | — | | 6 | 1 |
| Benfica | Total | | 23 | 3 | — | | 4 | 2 | 8 | 1 | 9 | 2 | 0 | 0 | 44 | 8 |
| Santos (loan) | 2011 | Série A | 27 | 2 | — | | — | | — | | — | | 2 (Note: Appearance(s) in FIFA Club World Cup) | 0 | 29 | 2 |
| Santos (loan) | 2012 | Série A | 4 | 0 | 20 (Note: Appearance(s) in Campeonato Paulista) | 7 | — | | — | | 11 (Note: Appearance(s) in Copa Libertadores) | 4 | — | | 35 | 11 |
| Santos (loan) | Total | | 31 | 2 | 20 | 7 | — | | — | | 11 | 4 | 2 | 0 | 64 | 13 |
| Benfica B | 2012–13 | Segunda Liga | 9 | 4 | — | | — | | — | | — | | — | | 9 | 4 |
| Palmeiras (loan) | 2013 | Série B | 27 | 14 | — | | 2 | 0 | — | | — | | — | | 29 | 14 |
| Palmeiras (loan) | 2014 | Série A | 1 | 1 | 15 | 9 | 1 | 0 | — | | — | | — | | 17 | 10 |
| Palmeiras (loan) | Total | | 28 | 15 | 15 | 9 | 3 | 0 | — | | — | | — | | 46 | 24 |
| São Paulo | 2014 | Série A | 27 | 8 | — | | — | | — | | 7 | 2 | — | | 34 | 10 |
| São Paulo | 2015 | Série A | 8 | 4 | 12 | 7 | 2 | 0 | — | | 3 | 0 | — | | 25 | 11 |
| São Paulo | 2016 | Série A | 12 | 3 | 12 | 1 | 0 | 0 | — | | 11 | 0 | — | | 35 | 4 |
| São Paulo | Total | | 47 | 15 | 24 | 8 | 2 | 0 | — | | 21 | 2 | — | | 94 | 25 |
| Chongqing Lifan | 2016 | Chinese Super League | 10 | 7 | — | | — | | — | | — | | — | | 10 | 7 |
| Chongqing Lifan | 2017 | Chinese Super League | 27 | 10 | — | | 0 | 0 | — | | — | | — | | 27 | 10 |
| Chongqing Lifan | 2018 | Chinese Super League | 28 | 16 | — | | 0 | 0 | — | | — | | — | | 28 | 16 |
| Chongqing Lifan | 2019 | Chinese Super League | 26 | 14 | — | | 2 | 1 | — | | — | | — | | 28 | 15 |
| Chongqing Lifan | 2020 | Chinese Super League | 15 | 8 | — | | 0 | 0 | — | | — | | — | | 15 | 8 |
| Chongqing Lifan | Total | | 106 | 55 | — | | 2 | 1 | — | | — | | — | | 108 | 56 |
| Shenzhen FC | 2021 | Chinese Super League | 16 | 11 | — | | 3 | 1 | — | | — | | — | | 19 | 12 |
| Atlético Mineiro | 2022 | Série A | 12 | 2 | — | | — | | — | | 1 | 0 | — | | 13 | 2 |
| Atlético Mineiro | 2023 | Série A | 14 | 1 | 0 | 0 | 0 | 0 | — | | 1 | 0 | — | | 15 | 1 |
| Atlético Mineiro | 2024 | Série A | 18 | 0 | 3 (Note: Appearance(s) in Campeonato Mineiro) | 0 | 2 | 1 | — | | 2 | 0 | — | | 25 | 1 |
| Atlético Mineiro | Total | | 44 | 3 | 3 | 0 | 2 | 1 | — | | 4 | 0 | — | | 53 | 4 |
| Athletico Paranaense | 2025 | Série B | 26 | 5 | 7 (Note: Appearance(s) in Campeonato Paranaense) | 4 | 2 | 0 | — | | — | | — | | 35 | 9 |
| Career total | | | 383 | 123 | 91 | 36 | 28 | 9 | 8 | 1 | 52 | 9 | 2 | 0 | 564 | 178 |

== Honors ==
Vasco da Gama

- Campeonato Brasileiro Série B: 2009

Benfica

- Primeira Liga: 2009–10
- Taça da Liga: 2009–10, 2010–11

Santos

- Campeonato Paulista: 2012

Palmeiras

- Campeonato Brasileiro Série B: 2013

Atlético Mineiro

- Campeonato Mineiro: 2023, 2024

Brazil

- South American Youth Football Championship: 2009
