= Eliton Deola =

Brazilian footballer (born 1983)

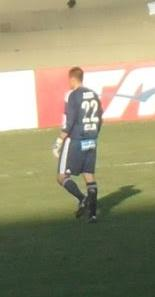

Personal information
- Full name: Eliton Deola
- Date of birth: April 19, 1983 (age 43)
- Place of birth: Céu Azul, Brazil
- Height: 1.89 m (6 ft 2 1/2 in)
- Position: Goalkeeper

Team information
- Current team: América RJ

Youth career
- 1997–1999: Atlético Sorocaba
- 2000–2003: Palmeiras

Senior career*
Years	Team	Apps	(Gls)
2003–2005	Palmeiras B		
2003	→ Sãocarlense (loan)		
2003–2016	Palmeiras		
2003	→ Matonense (loan)		
2006	→ Guarani (loan)		
2007	→ Juventus-SP (loan)		
2007	→ Grêmio Barueri (loan)		
2008	→ Sertãozinho (loan)		
2012–2013	→ Vitória (loan)		
2014	→ Atlético Sorocaba (loan)		
2015	→ Fortaleza (loan)		
2017	Juventus-SP		
2017	Taboão da Serra		
2018–2019	Fluminense de Feira		
2019	→ América RJ (loan)		
2019	→ Anapolina (loan)		
2019–	América RJ		
- * Club domestic league appearances and goals as of 5 January 2017

Eliton Deola (born April 19, 1983), commonly known as Deola, is a Brazilian footballer who plays as a goalkeeper for América RJ.

Deola joined Sociedade Esportiva Palmeiras at age 17. He turned professional with the club, embarking on an extended tenure in which he won the Copa de Brasil.

== Honours ==
Palmeiras

- Copa do Brasil: 2012

Vitória

- Campeonato Baiano: 2013

Fortaleza

- Campeonato Cearense: 2015
