= Clube Atlético Penapolense =

Penapolense
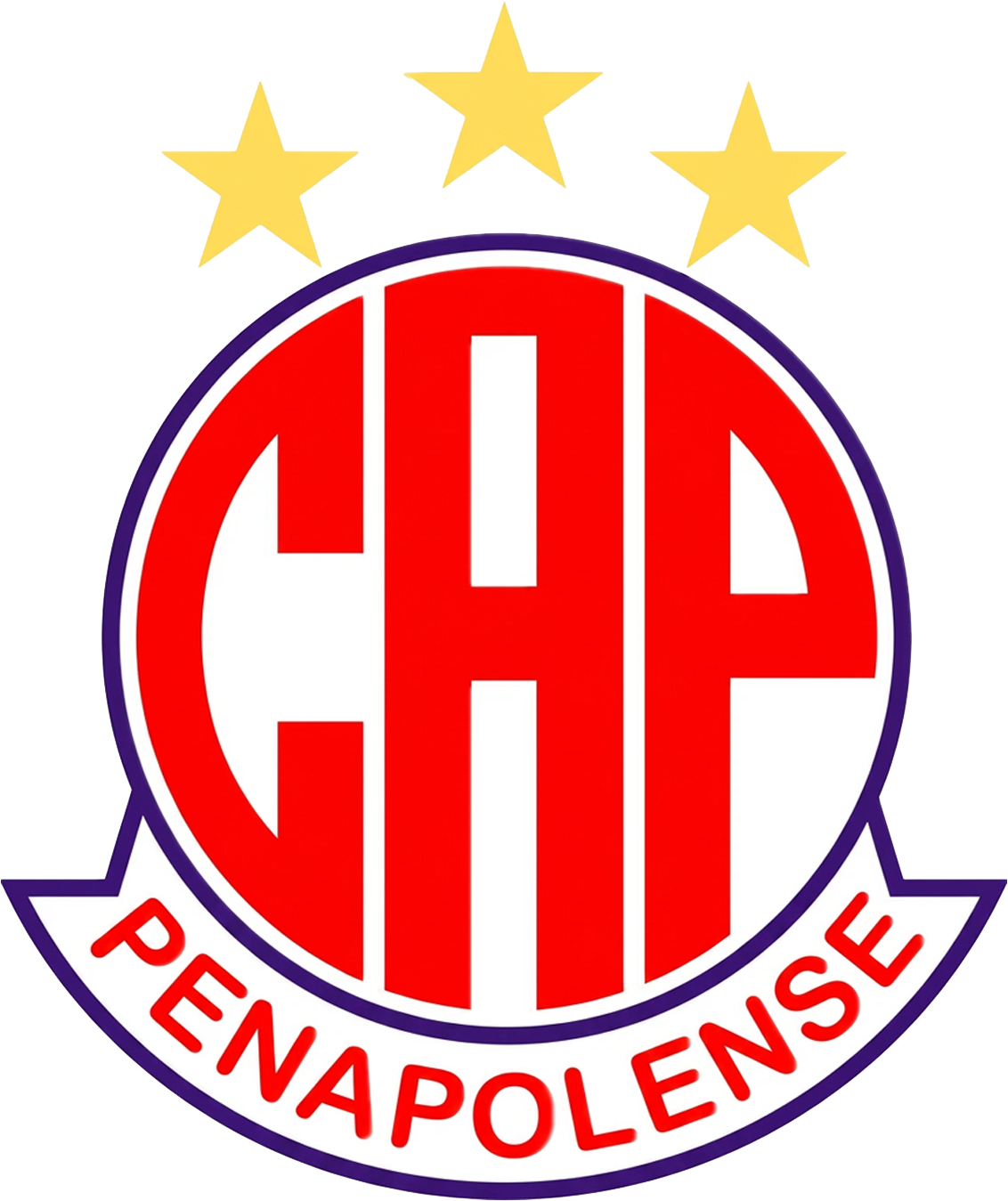
- Full name: Clube Atlético Penapolense
- Nicknames: Pantera da Noroeste (Northwest Panther); CAP
- Founded: 16 November 1944 (81 years ago)
- Ground: Tenentão
- Capacity: 11.000
- President: Luis Mariano
- Head coach: Thiago Oliveira
- League: Campeonato Paulista Série A4
- 2025: Paulista Série A4, 12th of 16
- Website: penapolense.soudaliga.com.br
Home colors	Away colors

Clube Atlético Penapolense, commonly referred to as Penapolense, is a professional association football club based in Penápolis, São Paulo, Brazil. It competes in the Campeonato Paulista Série A3, the third tier of the São Paulo state football league.

The club's home colours are red and blue and the team mascot is a panther.

== History ==
The club was founded on November 16, 1944, ten years after two local clubs, named Esporte Clube Corinthians and Penápolis Futebol Clube, folded. The club was founded after a Penápolis combined team played a friendly game against a local combined team in Fernandópolis. Penapolense won the Campeonato Paulista Série A3 in 2011.

== Stadium ==
Penapolense's home stadium is Estádio Municipal Tenente Carriço, nicknamed Tenentão, which has a maximum capacity of 8,769 people.

== Honours ==
- Campeonato Paulista Série A3
  - Winners (1): 2011
- Campeonato Paulista Série A4
  - Winners (1): 2026
- Campeonato Paulista do Interior
  - Winners (1): 2014
