= Fernando Prass =

Brazilian footballer (born 1978)

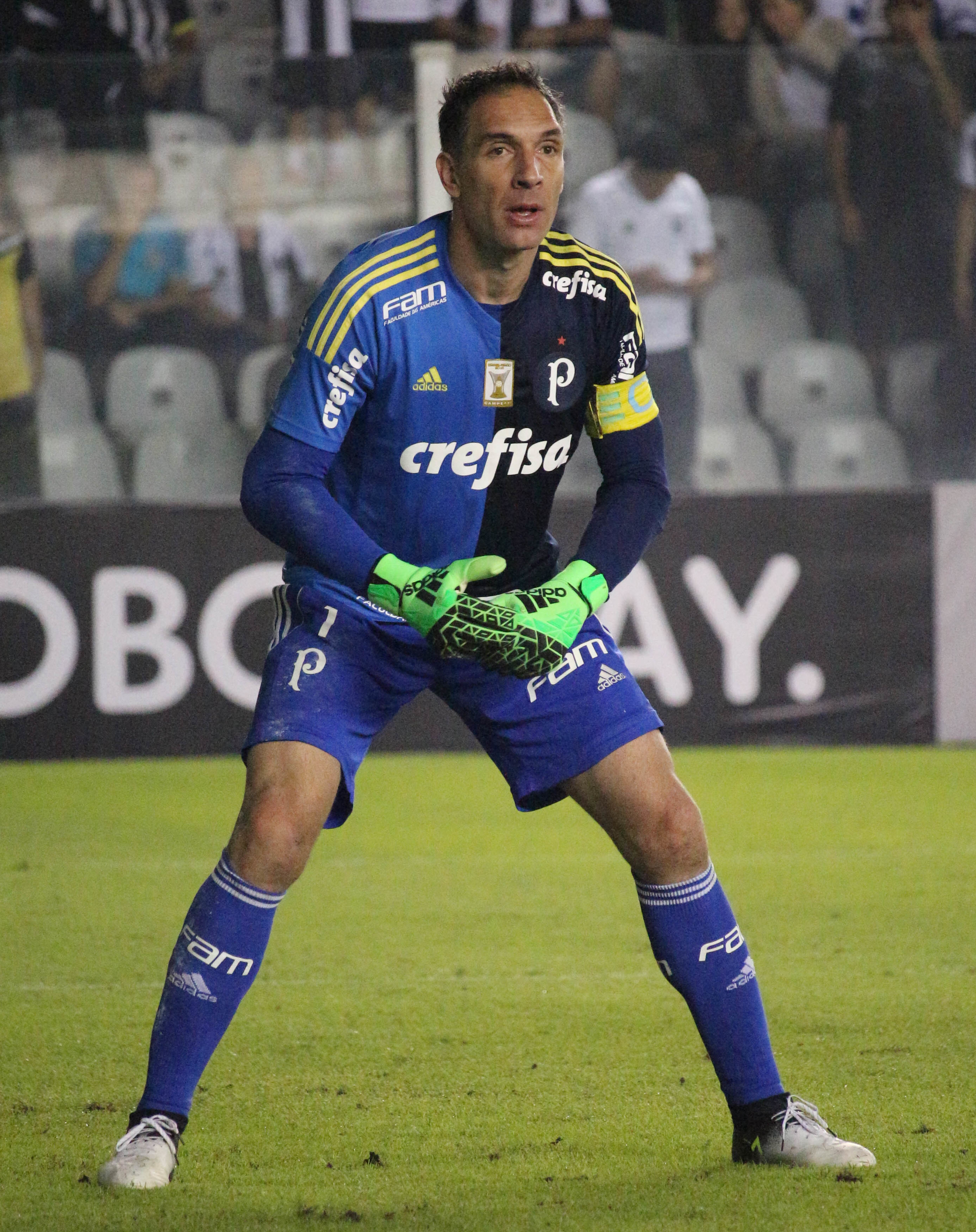
- Prass playing for Palmeiras in 2017

Personal information
- Full name: Fernando Büttenbender Prass
- Date of birth: 9 July 1978 (age 48)
- Place of birth: Porto Alegre, Brazil
- Height: 1.91 m (6 ft 3 in)
- Position: Goalkeeper

Youth career
- 1989–1998: Grêmio

Senior career*
Years	Team	Apps	(Gls)
1998–2000	Grêmio	0	(0)
2000	→ Francana (loan)	21	(0)
2001	Vila Nova	28	(0)
2002–2005	Coritiba	149	(0)
2005–2009	União Leiria	81	(0)
2009–2012	Vasco da Gama	201	(0)
2013–2019	Palmeiras	229	(0)
2020	Ceará	34	(0)
Total		743	(0)
- * Club domestic league appearances and goals

Fernando Büttenbender Prass (born 9 July 1978) is a Brazilian football pundit and former player who played as a goalkeeper.

== Club career ==
=== Early years ===
Prass was born in Porto Alegre. After starting professionally with local Grêmio (but never playing a senior match for them), he joined Francana in 2000, on loan.

In 2001, Prass joined Campeonato Brasileiro Série B side Vila Nova, becoming a starter midway through the season. He moved to Coritiba in the Série A the following year, and spent four seasons there.

In December 2004, already an undisputed starter, Prass renewed his contract.

=== União Leiria ===
In June 2005, Prass moved abroad and joined Portugal's União de Leiria, as compatriot Helton had left for Porto also of the Primeira Liga. He made his league debut on 11 September 2005 in a 0–0 home draw against Marítimo, and retained first-choice status from that moment onwards.

In the 2006–07 season, Prass only missed two league games as Leiria finished seventh and qualified for the UEFA Intertoto Cup, eventually being one of the competition's winners and appearing in the UEFA Cup, being ousted by Bayer Leverkusen in the first round (4–5 on aggregate). The following campaign, the team dropped down to the second division.

=== Vasco da Gama ===
After appearing in 14 matches to help União return to the top flight in 2009, the 31-year-old Prass returned to his country and signed for Vasco da Gama, playing in the second level for the first time in 110 years of history. Rarely missing a match, he helped the Rio de Janeiro side finish as champions and promote immediately, with the best defensive record in the league.

=== Palmeiras ===
On 10 December 2012, Prass left Vasco and joined Palmeiras, recently relegated to the second tier. He helped them return to the top tier at the first attempt; he quickly became a fan favorite due to his saves and was eventually named team captain, as he led them to their third Copa do Brasil title in 2015, scoring the last penalty against rivals Santos in a 4–3 shoot-out victory.

On 3 April 2016, Prass saved Lucca's penalty in a 1–0 home win over Corinthians, the Alviverde's first win over their rival at Pacaembu for nearly 21 years. After a good start to the season, he was sidelined with a shoulder injury until December. While his replacement Jailson had a superb year, Prass was handed back the starting role as soon as he recovered.

Midway through the 2017 campaign, however, Jailson was again named first choice over Prass. This only lasted five games as the latter was once again named starter, this time due to an injury to the former.

Prass extended his contract with Palmeiras until December 2018. After Jailson's recovery and the signing of Weverton in January of that year, he was demoted to third option on the squad.

On 7 December 2019, Prass departed the club.

=== Ceará ===
On 8 January 2020, at the age of 41, Prass signed a one-year deal with Ceará. He retired at the end of the season.

== International career ==
On 29 June 2016, aged nearly 38 and having never earned any cap for the full side, Prass was selected by the Brazil national under-23 team for the 2016 Summer Olympics by manager Rogério Micale, as one of three overage players. On 31 July, however, he left the squad due to an elbow injury and was replaced by Weverton.

== Style of play ==
Prass was known for his ability to save penalty kicks, also working closely with Palmeiras employees to study his adversaries. In March 2017, coach Émerson Leão said he would be the perfect choice to lecture younger players in the position who made the national team.

== Post-retirement ==
Prass became an analyst after retiring, working with TNT Sports for Palmeiras matches in the 2022 Campeonato Paulista.

== Club statistics ==
As of 27 December 2020

Club	Season	League			Cup		Continental		State League		Other		Total	
Club	Season	Division	Apps	Goals	Apps	Goals	Apps	Goals	Apps	Goals	Apps	Goals	Apps	Goals
Francana	2000	Paulista A2	—		—		—		21	0	—		21	0
Vila Nova	2001	Série B	25	0	2	0	—		3	0	1 (Note: Appearance(s) in Copa Centro-Oeste)	0	31	0
Coritiba	2002	Série A	25	0	2	0	—		4	0	6 (Note: Appearance(s) in Copa Sul-Minas)	0	37	0
Coritiba	2003	Série A	42	0	2	0	—		13	0	—		57	0
Coritiba	2004	Série A	40	0	—		2 (Note: Appearance(s) in Copa Sudamericana)	0	15	0	—		57	0
Coritiba	2005	Série A	4	0	5	0	—		19	0	—		28	0
Coritiba	Total		111	0	9	0	2	0	51	0	6	0	179	0
União Leiria	2005–06	Primeira Liga	9	0	0	0	0	0	—		—		9	0
União Leiria	2006–07	Primeira Liga	28	0	2	0	0	0	—		—		30	0
União Leiria	2007–08	Primeira Liga	30	0	2	0	6 (Note: Two appearances in UEFA Intertoto Cup, four appearances in UEFA Cup)	0	—		2 (Note: Appearance(s) in Taça da Liga)	0	40	0
União Leiria	2008–09	Primeira Liga	14	0	2	0	0	0	—		3	0	19	0
União Leiria	Total		81	0	6	0	6	0	—		5	0	98	0
Vasco Gama	2009	Série B	36	0	4	0	—		0	0	—		40	0
Vasco Gama	2010	Série A	38	0	7	0	—		18	0	—		63	0
Vasco Gama	2011	Série A	38	0	11	0	8	0	17	0	—		74	0
Vasco Gama	2012	Série A	37	0	—		10 (Note: Appearance(s) in Copa Libertadores)	0	17	0	—		64	0
Vasco Gama	Total		149	0	22	0	18	0	52	0	—		241	0
Palmeiras	2013	Série B	29	0	2	0	6	0	18	0	—		55	0
Palmeiras	2014	Série A	15	0	1	0	—		16	0	—		32	0
Palmeiras	2015	Série A	36	0	12	1	—		18	0	—		66	0
Palmeiras	2016	Série A	16	0	—		6	0	17	0	—		39	0
Palmeiras	2017	Série A	33	0	3	0	7	0	15	0	—		58	0
Palmeiras	2018	Série A	3	0	0	0	1	0	3	0	—		7	0
Palmeiras	2019	Série A	3	0	1	0	0	0	7	0	—		11	0
Palmeiras	Total		135	0	19	0	20	0	94	0	—		268	0
Ceará	2020	Série A	22	0	10	0	—		8	0	12 (Note: Appearance(s) in Copa do Nordeste)	0	52	0
Career total			523	0	68	1	46	0	229	0	24	0	883	0

== Honours ==
=== Club ===
Grêmio

- Campeonato Gaúcho: 1999
- Copa Sul: 1999

Vila Nova

- Campeonato Goiano: 2001

Coritiba

- Campeonato Paranaense: 2004

Vasco

- Campeonato Brasileiro Série B: 2009
- Copa do Brasil: 2011

Palmeiras

- Campeonato Brasileiro Série A: 2016, 2018
- Campeonato Brasileiro Série B: 2013
- Copa do Brasil: 2015

Ceará

- Copa do Nordeste: 2020

=== Individual ===
- Bola de Prata: 2011
- Campeonato Paulista Team of the Year: 2015
