= 2010 CR Flamengo season =

Flamengo
2010 season
- Chairwoman: Patrícia Amorim
- Manager: Andrade (until 23 April); Rogério Lourenço (from 24 April to 27 August); Paulo Silas (from 30 August to 4 October); Vanderlei Luxemburgo (since 5 October)
- Série A: 14th
- Campeonato Carioca: Runner-up
- Copa Libertadores: Quarter-finals
- Top goalscorer: League: Dejan Petković & Diego Maurício (5 goals); All: Vágner Love (23 goals)
- Highest home attendance: 72,442 ( v Corinthians in the Copa Libertadores)
- Lowest home attendance: 3,118 ( v Tigres do Brasil in the Rio State League)
- Average home league attendance: 15,937
Home colours	Away colours	Third colours

The 2010 season was the 115th year in the club's history, the 99th season in Clube de Regatas do Flamengo's football existence, and their 40th in the Brazilian Série A, having never been relegated from the top division.

== Club ==
=== First-team staff ===
Updated 4 December 2010.

Position	Name	Nationality
Coach	Vanderlei Luxemburgo	Brazilian
Assistant coach	Paulo Pereira	Brazilian
Technical assistant	Marcos Grippi	Brazilian
Goalkeeping Coach	Cantarele	Brazilian
Fitness coaches	Emerson Buck	Brazilian
Fitness coaches	Daniel Jouvin	Brazilian
Fitness coaches	Diogo Linhares	Brazilian
Medical staff manager	José Luiz Runco	Brazilian
Doctors	Walter Martins	Brazilian
Doctors	Marcelo Soares	Brazilian
Doctors	Marcio Tannure	Brazilian
Doctors	Serafim Borges	Brazilian
Physiotherapists	Fabiano Bastos	Brazilian
Physiotherapists	Gláucio Barbosa	Brazilian
Physiotherapists	Leonardo Reis	Brazilian
Physiologist	Paulo Figueiredo	Brazilian
Nutritionist	Silvia Ferreira	Brazilian
Psychologist	Paulo Ribeiro	Brazilian
Masseurs	Adenir Silva	Brazilian
Masseurs	Esmar Russo	Brazilian
Masseurs	Jorginho	Brazilian
General manager	Vacant	

=== Other information ===
Chairman	(Brazil) Patrícia Amorim
Ground (capacity and dimensions)	Maracanã (88,992 / 110x75 meters)
Ground (capacity and dimensions)	Estádio Raulino de Oliveira (21,000 / 105x70 meters)
Ground (capacity and dimensions)	Engenhão (46,931 / 105x68 meters)

Source: CBF

=== First-team squad ===
As of December, 2010, according to combined sources on the official website.

Note: Flags indicate national team as defined under FIFA eligibility rules; some limited exceptions apply. Players may hold more than one non-FIFA nationality.

No.	Pos.	Nation	Player
2	DF	BRA	Leonardo Moura (captain)
4	DF	BRA	Ronaldo Angelim
6	DF	BRA	Juan
7	MF	BRA	Corrêa (on loan from Dynamo Kyiv)
8	MF	BRA	Willians
9	FW	BRA	Val Baiano
10	MF	SRB	Dejan Petković
11	MF	BRA	Renato
13	MF	CHI	Claudio Maldonado
14	DF	BRA	David Braz
15	MF	BRA	Kléberson
16	MF	CHI	Gonzalo Fierro
17	MF	BRA	Fernando
18	DF	BRA	Marllon
20	FW	BRA	Rafinha
23	DF	BRA	Welinton
25	MF	BRA	Léo Medeiros
26	DF	BRA	Jean
27	GK	BRA	Paulo Victor

No.	Pos.	Nation	Player
28	GK	BRA	Vinícius (on loan from Boavista)
29	GK	BRA	Marcelo Lomba
31	GK	BRA	Marcelo Carné
32	DF	BRA	Rodrigo Alvim
35	DF	BRA	Jorbison
36	MF	BRA	Guilherme Negueba
38	MF	BRA	Marquinhos (on loan from Desportivo Brasil)
41	MF	BRA	Antônio
42	DF	BRA	Rafael Galhardo
43	FW	BRA	Diogo (on loan from Olympiacos)
44	MF	BRA	William Amendoim
46	MF	BRA	Vítor Saba
48	MF	BRA	Carlyle
49	FW	BRA	Diego Maurício
50	GK	BRA	Diego Lima
80	MF	BRA	Michael (on loan from Dynamo Kyiv)
88	DF	BRA	Uendel (on loan from Grêmio)
99	FW	BRA	Deivid

Players with Dual Nationality

- (Brazil) (Spain) Juan
- (Brazil) (Portugal) Deivid

=== Flamengo Youth Team ===
==== Professional players able to play in the youth team ====
Note: Flags indicate national team as defined under FIFA eligibility rules; some limited exceptions apply. Players may hold more than one non-FIFA nationality.

No.	Pos.	Nation	Player
18	DF	BRA	Marllon
20	FW	BRA	Rafinha
31	GK	BRA	Marcelo Carné
35	DF	BRA	Jorbison
36	MF	BRA	Guilherme Negueba

No.	Pos.	Nation	Player
42	DF	BRA	Rafael Galhardo
46	MF	BRA	Vítor Saba
48	MF	BRA	Carlyle
49	FW	BRA	Diego Maurício
50	GK	BRA	Diego Lima

==== Youth players with first team experience ====
Note: Flags indicate national team as defined under FIFA eligibility rules; some limited exceptions apply. Players may hold more than one non-FIFA nationality.

No.	Pos.	Nation	Player
—	DF	BRA	Christiano
—	DF	BRA	Henrique
—	DF	BRA	Anderson
—	MF	BRA	Luiz Antônio

No.	Pos.	Nation	Player
—	MF	BRA	João Vitor
—	MF	BRA	Eliabe
—	FW	BRA	Juninho

=== Out on loan ===
Note: Flags indicate national team as defined under FIFA eligibility rules; some limited exceptions apply. Players may hold more than one non-FIFA nationality.

No.	Pos.	Nation	Player
—	DF	BRA	Everton Silva (loan to Ponte Preta)
—	DF	BRA	Marlon (loan to Duque de Caxias)
—	DF	BRA	Egídio (loan to Vitória)
—	MF	BRA	Rômulo (loan to Atlético Goianiense)
—	MF	BRA	Lenon (loan to Goiás)
—	MF	BRA	Erick Flores (loan to Náutico)

No.	Pos.	Nation	Player
—	MF	BRA	Guilherme Camacho (loan to Goiás)
—	MF	BRA	Vinícius Pacheco (loan to Figueirense)
—	MF	BRA	Rodrigo Broa (loan to Águia de Marabá)
—	FW	BRA	Paulo Sérgio (loan to Estoril)
—	FW	BRA	Fabiano Oliveira (loan to Boluspor)
—	FW	BRA	Bruno Mezenga (loan to Legia Warszawa)

== Transfers ==
=== In ===
Note: Flags indicate national team as defined under FIFA eligibility rules; some limited exceptions apply. Players may hold more than one non-FIFA nationality.

No.	Pos.	Nation	Player
—	FW	BRA	Obina (loan return from Palmeiras)
—	FW	BRA	Paulo Sérgio (loan return from Figueirense)
—	DF	BRA	Egídio (loan return from Figueirense)
—	MF	BRA	Léo Medeiros (loan return from Bahia)
—	MF	BRA	Vinícius Pacheco (loan return from Figueirense)
—	MF	BRA	Fernando (transfer from Goiás)
—	MF	BRA	Michael (loan from Dynamo Kyiv until December 2010)
—	FW	BRA	Vagner Love (loan from CSKA Moscow until July 2010)
—	DF	BRA	Rodrigo Alvim (transfer from VfL Wolfsburg)
—	MF	BRA	Ramón (loan from CSKA Moscow until July 2010)
—	MF	BRA	Antônio (loan return from Americano)
—	MF	BRA	William Amendoim (loan return from Americano)
—	DF	BRA	Jean (free transfer from FC Moscow)
—	DF	BRA	Thiago Sales (loan return from Apollon Limassol)

No.	Pos.	Nation	Player
—	MF	BRA	Antônio (loan return from CFZ)
—	MF	BRA	Renato Abreu (transfer from Al-Shabab)
—	MF	BRA	Corrêa (loan from Dynamo Kyiv until December 2010)
—	FW	BRA	Val Baiano (free transfer)
—	FW	COL	Cristian Borja (loan from Caxias do Sul until July 2011)
—	FW	BRA	Marquinhos (transfer from Palmeiras)
—	GK	BRA	Vinícius (loan from Boavista until December 2010)
—	FW	BRA	Fabiano Oliveira (loan return from Giresunspor)
—	FW	BRA	Leandro Amaral (free transfer)
—	FW	BRA	Deivid (transfer from Fenerbahçe)
—	FW	BRA	Diogo (loan from Olympiacos until July 2011)
—	MF	CHI	Gonzalo Fierro (loan return from Boca Juniors, failed on medical)
—	MF	BRA	Erick Flores (loan return from Ceará)
—	DF	BRA	Uendel (loan from Grêmio until December 2011)

=== Out ===
Note: Flags indicate national team as defined under FIFA eligibility rules; some limited exceptions apply. Players may hold more than one non-FIFA nationality.

No.	Pos.	Nation	Player
—	MF	BRA	Aírton (transfer to S.L. Benfica)
—	FW	ARG	Maxi Biancucchi (released)
—	MF	BRA	Alex Cruz (loan return to Ivinhema)
—	MF	BRA	Zé Roberto (loan return to Schalke 04)
—	GK	BRA	Diego (loan return to Madureira)
—	MF	BRA	Éverton (transfer to UANL Tigres)
—	DF	BRA	Egídio (loan to Vitória until December 2010)
—	DF	BRA	Marlon (loan to Duque de Caxias until December 2010)
—	FW	BRA	Obina (transfer to Atlético Mineiro)
—	MF	BRA	Antônio (loan to Americano until May 2010)
—	MF	BRA	William Amendoim (loan to Americano)
—	MF	BRA	Bruno Paulo (end of contract)
—	MF	BRA	Erick Flores (loan to Ceará until December 2010)
—	MF	BRA	Antônio (loan to CFZ until August 2010)
—	MF	BRA	William Amendoim (loan to CFZ until August 2010)
—	FW	BRA	Adriano (transfer to A.S. Roma)
—	FW	BRA	Bruno Mezenga (loan to Legia Warszawa)
—	DF	BRA	Álvaro (end of contract)

No.	Pos.	Nation	Player
—	FW	BRA	Vagner Love (loan return to CSKA Moscow)
—	FW	BRA	Gil (end of contract)
—	MF	CHI	Gonzalo Fierro (loan to Boca Juniors until July 2011)
—	FW	BRA	Denis Marques (loan return to Omiya Ardija)
—	FW	BRA	Paulo Sérgio (loan to GD Estoril until July 2011)
—	MF	BRA	Ramón (loan return to CSKA Moscow)
—	FW	BRA	Fabiano Oliveira (loan to Boluspor until July 2011)
—	DF	BRA	Fabrício (transfer to Palmeiras)
—	DF	BRA	Thiago Sales (end of contract)
—	MF	BRA	Erick Flores (loan to Náutico until December 2010)
—	MF	BRA	Vinícius Pacheco (loan to from Figueirense until December 2010)
—	DF	BRA	Everton Silva (loan to Ponte Preta until August 2011)
—	MF	BRA	Lenon (loan to Goiás until December 2010)
—	MF	BRA	Guilherme Camacho (loan to Goiás Until December 2010)
—	MF	BRA	Rômulo (loan to Atlético Goianiense until December 2010)
—	FW	BRA	Leandro Amaral (released)
—	MF	BRA	Toró (end of contract)
—	FW	COL	Cristian Borja (Released)

== Statistics ==
=== Appearances and goals ===
Last updated on 4 December 2010.

- Players in italic have left the club during the season.

No.	Pos	Nat	Player	Total		Carioca		Copa Libertadores		Série A	
No.	Pos	Nat	Player	Apps	Goals	Apps	Goals	Apps	Goals	Apps	Goals
1	GK	(Brazil) BRA	Bruno (*)	33	1	17	0	9	0	7	1
2	DF	(Brazil) BRA	Leonardo Moura	57	4	13	1	9	2	35	1
3	DF	(Brazil) BRA	Álvaro	18	0	11	0	5	0	2	0
4	DF	(Brazil) BRA	Ronaldo Angelim	51	3	9+2	1	7+1	1	32	1
5	MF	(Brazil) BRA	Toró	36	2	15	0	5+2	0	12+2	2
6	DF	(Brazil) BRA	Juan	55	2	12	0	10	1	33	1
7	MF	(Brazil) BRA	Corrêa	25	0	0	0	0	0	20+5	0
8	MF	(Brazil) BRA	Willians	49	0	10+1	0	9	0	28+1	0
9	FW	(Brazil) BRA	Vágner Love	29	23	14	15	10	4	5	4
9	FW	(Brazil) BRA	Val Baiano	18	3	0	0	0	0	10+8	3
10	FW	(Brazil) BRA	Adriano	18	15	10	11	7	4	1	0
10	MF	(Serbia) SRB	Dejan Petković (**)	49	6	4+9	1	2+6	0	17+11	5
11	FW	(Brazil) BRA	Denis Marques	4	2	1+1	1	0+1	0	1	1
11	MF	(Brazil) BRA	Renato Abreu	22	4	0	0	0	0	22	4
13	MF	(Chile) CHI	Claudio Maldonado	28	0	4+1	0	5+1	0	13+4	0
14	DF	(Brazil) BRA	David	31	2	7+1	1	5	0	17+1	1
15	MF	(Brazil) BRA	Kléberson	42	6	12+1	3	6+2	0	18+3	3
16	MF	(Chile) CHI	Gonzalo Fierro	22	1	6+6	1	0+6	0	1+3	0
17	MF	(Brazil) BRA	Fernando	21	3	7+2	3	1+1	0	4+6	0
18	FW	(Brazil) BRA	Gil	2	0	0+1	0	0	0	0+1	0
18	DF	(Brazil) BRA	Marllon	0	0	0	0	0	0	0	0
19	DF	(Brazil) BRA	Everton Silva	10	0	5+2	0	0+1	0	2	0
20	FW	(Brazil) BRA	Obina	2	0	2	0	0	0	0	0
20	DF	(Brazil) BRA	Fabrício	16	0	8+1	0	3+1	0	0+3	0
20	FW	(Brazil) BRA	Rafinha	0	0	0	0	0	0	0	0
21	MF	(Brazil) BRA	Lenon	4	0	2+2	0	0	0	0	0
22	MF	(Brazil) BRA	Vinícius Pacheco	40	4	10+5	4	6+3	0	8+8	0
23	DF	(Brazil) BRA	Welinton	18	1	1+1	0	0	0	15+1	1
25	MF	(Brazil) BRA	Léo Medeiros	1	0	1	0	0	0	0	0
26	MF	(Brazil) BRA	Erick Flores	2	0	1+1	0	0	0	0	0
26	DF	(Brazil) BRA	Jean	15	1	0	0	0	0	13+2	1
27	GK	(Brazil) BRA	Paulo Victor	1	0	0	0	0	0	1	0
28	MF	(Brazil) BRA	Ramón	9	0	1+6	0	0	0	0+2	0
28	GK	(Brazil) BRA	Vinícius	0	0	0	0	0	0	0	0
29	GK	(Brazil) BRA	Marcelo Lomba	32	0	1	0	1	0	30	0
31	GK	(Brazil) BRA	Marcelo Carné	0	0	0	0	0	0	0	0
32	DF	(Brazil) BRA	Rodrigo Alvim	12	2	2+5	0	1+1	2	3	0
33	FW	(Brazil) BRA	Paulo Sérgio	1	1	0	0	0	0	0+1	1
33	FW	(Brazil) BRA	Leandro Amaral	4	0	0	0	0	0	3+1	0
34	MF	(Brazil) BRA	Guilherme Camacho	7	0	0+1	0	0	0	3+3	0
35	DF	(Brazil) BRA	Jorbison	0	0	0	0	0	0	0	0
36	MF	(Brazil) BRA	Guilherme Negueba	3	0	0	0	0	0	2+1	0
37	FW	(Brazil) BRA	Bruno Mezenga	10	4	5+1	4	0+3	0	1	0
37	FW	(Colombia) COL	Cristian Borja	7	0	0	0	0	0	2+5	0
38	FW	(Brazil) BRA	Marquinhos	8	1	0	0	0	0	0+8	1
39	MF	(Brazil) BRA	Rômulo	9	0	0+1	0	3	0	3+2	0
41	MF	(Brazil) BRA	Antônio	1	0	0	0	0	0	1	0
42	DF	(Brazil) BRA	Rafael Galhardo	7	0	0+1	0	0	0	1+5	0
43	FW	(Brazil) BRA	Diogo	17	1	0	0	0	0	15+2	1
44	MF	(Brazil) BRA	William Amendoim	0	0	0	0	0	0	0	0
46	MF	(Brazil) BRA	Vítor Saba	1	0	0	0	0	0	0+1	0
48	MF	(Brazil) BRA	Carlyle	0	0	0	0	0	0	0	0
49	FW	(Brazil) BRA	Diego Maurício	29	5	0	0	0	0	13+16	5
50	GK	(Brazil) BRA	Diego Lima	0	0	0	0	0	0	0	0
80	MF	(Brazil) BRA	Michael	17	2	3+1	0	4+1	2	5+3	0
88	MF	(Brazil) BRA	Uendel	0	0	0	0	0	0	0	0
99	FW	(Brazil) BRA	Deivid	17	4	0	0	0	0	16+1	4
—	DF	(Brazil) BRA	Thiago Sales	0	0	0	0	0	0	0	0
—	MF	(Brazil) BRA	Wellington Pecka	0	0	0	0	0	0	0	0
—	MF	(Brazil) BRA	Renan Silva	0	0	0	0	0	0	0	0

(*) Bruno had his contract suspended due to criminal problems.
(**) Dejan Petković changed his shirt number from 43 to 10 during the season.

=== Top scorers ===
Includes all competitive matches

Position	Nation	Number	Name	Carioca League	Copa Libertadores	Série A	Total
1	(Brazil)	9	Vágner Love	15	4	4	23
2	(Brazil)	10	Adriano	11	4	0	15
3	(Serbia)	43/10	Dejan Petkovic	1	0	5	6
3	(Brazil)	15	Kléberson	3	0	3	6
4	(Brazil)	49	Diego Maurício	0	0	5	5
5	(Brazil)	99	Deivid	0	0	4	4
5	(Brazil)	11	Renato Abreu	0	0	4	4
5	(Brazil)	2	Leonardo Moura	1	2	1	4
5	(Brazil)	37	Bruno Mezenga	4	0	0	4
5	(Brazil)	22	Vinícius Pacheco	4	0	0	4
6	(Brazil)	9	Val Baiano	0	0	3	3
6	(Brazil)	4	Ronaldo Angelim	1	1	1	3
6	(Brazil)	17	Fernando	3	0	0	3
7	(Brazil)	5	Toró	0	0	2	2
7	(Brazil)	11	Denis Marques	1	0	1	2
7	(Brazil)	14	David	0	1	1	2
7	(Brazil)	6	Juan	0	1	1	2
7	(Brazil)	32	Rodrigo Alvim	0	2	0	2
7	(Brazil)	80	Michael	0	2	0	2
8	(Brazil)	1	Bruno	0	0	1	1
8	(Brazil)	23	Welinton	0	0	1	1
8	(Brazil)	26	Jean	0	0	1	1
8	(Brazil)	33	Paulo Sérgio	0	0	1	1
8	(Brazil)	43	Diogo	0	0	1	1
8	(Brazil)	38	Marquinhos	0	0	1	1
8	(Chile)	16	Gonzalo Fierro	1	0	0	1
			Own Goal	1	0	0	1
			Total	46	17	41	104

=== Clean sheets ===
Includes all competitive matches

Position	Nation	Number	Name	Carioca League	Copa Libertadores	Série A	Total
GK	(Brazil)	1	Bruno	3	1	1	5
GK	(Brazil)	27	Paulo Victor	0	0	1	1
GK	(Brazil)	29	Marcelo Lomba	1	1	8	10
			Total	4	2	10	16

=== Disciplinary record ===
Position	Nation	Number	Name	Carioca League		Copa Libertadores		Série A		Total	
Position	Nation	Number	Name	Booked	Sent off (straight red)	Booked	Sent off (straight red)	Booked	Sent off (straight red)	Booked	Sent off (straight red)
GK	(Brazil)	1	Bruno	2	0	3	0	0	0	5	0
DF	(Brazil)	2	Leonardo Moura	3	1	0	0	6	1	9	2
DF	(Brazil)	3	Álvaro	5	2	1	0	1	0	7	2
DF	(Brazil)	4	Ronaldo Angelim	3	0	0	0	2	0	5	0
MF	(Brazil)	5	Toró	9	1	1	1	4	0	14	2
DF	(Brazil)	6	Juan	5	1	3	0	6	0	14	1
MF	(Brazil)	7	Corrêa	0	0	0	0	4	0	4	0
MF	(Brazil)	8	Willians	5	0	5	1	8	0	18	1
FW	(Brazil)	9	Vágner Love	3	0	2	1	0	0	5	1
FW	(Brazil)	9	Val Baiano	0	0	0	0	1	0	1	0
FW	(Brazil)	10	Adriano	0	0	0	0	0	0	0	0
MF	(Serbia)	10/43	Dejan Petković	1	0	0	0	2	0	3	0
FW	(Brazil)	11	Denis Marques	0	0	0	0	0	0	0	0
MF	(Brazil)	11	Renato Abreu	0	0	0	0	4	1	4	1
MF	(Chile)	13	Claudio Maldonado	1	1	0	0	4	0	5	1
DF	(Brazil)	14	David	4	0	2	0	4	1	10	1
MF	(Brazil)	15	Kléberson	1	0	0	0	3	0	4	0
MF	(Chile)	16	Gonzalo Fierro	1	0	2	0	0	0	3	0
DF	(Brazil)	17	Fernando	0	0	0	0	2	1	2	1
FW	(Brazil)	18	Gil	0	0	0	0	0	0	0	0
DF	(Brazil)	18	Marllon	0	0	0	0	0	0	0	0
DF	(Brazil)	19	Everton Silva	2	0	0	0	1	0	3	0
FW	(Brazil)	20	Obina	1	0	0	0	0	0	1	0
DF	(Brazil)	20	Fabrício	2	0	0	0	0	0	2	0
FW	(Brazil)	20	Rafinha	0	0	0	0	0	0	0	0
MF	(Brazil)	21	Lenon	1	0	0	0	0	0	1	0
MF	(Brazil)	22	Vinícius Pacheco	2	0	1	0	1	0	4	0
DF	(Brazil)	23	Welinton	0	0	0	0	3	0	3	0
MF	(Brazil)	25	Léo Medeiros	0	0	0	0	0	0	0	0
MF	(Brazil)	26	Erick Flores	0	0	0	0	0	0	0	0
MF	(Brazil)	26	Jean	0	0	0	0	6	1	6	1
MF	(Brazil)	28	Ramón	1	0	0	0	1	0	2	0
MF	(Brazil)	29	Marcelo Lomba	0	0	0	0	2	0	2	0
GK	(Brazil)	31	Marcelo Carné	0	0	0	0	0	0	0	0
DF	(Brazil)	32	Rodrigo Alvim	3	0	0	0	0	0	3	0
FW	(Brazil)	33	Paulo Sérgio	0	0	0	0	1	0	1	0
MF	(Brazil)	34	Guilherme Camacho	1	0	0	0	5	0	6	0
DF	(Brazil)	35	Jorbison	0	0	0	0	0	0	0	0
MF	(Brazil)	36	Guilherme Negueba	0	0	0	0	1	0	1	0
FW	(Brazil)	37	Bruno Mezenga	2	0	0	0	0	0	2	0
FW	(Colombia)	37	Cristian Borja	0	0	0	0	2	0	2	0
MF	(Brazil)	38	Marquinhos	0	0	0	0	1	0	1	0
MF	(Brazil)	39	Rômulo	0	0	0	0	0	0	0	0
MF	(Brazil)	41	Antônio	0	0	0	0	0	0	0	0
DF	(Brazil)	42	Rafael Galhardo	0	0	0	0	1	0	1	0
FW	(Brazil)	43	Diogo	0	0	0	0	4	1	4	1
MF	(Brazil)	44	William Amendoim	0	0	0	0	0	0	0	0
MF	(Brazil)	46	Vítor Saba	0	0	0	0	0	0	0	0
MF	(Brazil)	48	Carlyle	0	0	0	0	0	0	0	0
FW	(Brazil)	49	Diego Maurício	0	0	0	0	1	0	1	0
GK	(Brazil)	50	Diego Lima	0	0	0	0	0	0	0	0
MF	(Brazil)	80	Michael	1	0	2	1	1	0	4	1
DF	(Brazil)	88	Uendel	0	0	0	0	0	0	0	0
FW	(Brazil)	99	Deivid	0	0	0	0	3	0	3	0
DF	(Brazil)	—	Thiago Sales	0	0	0	0	0	0	0	0
MF	(Brazil)	—	Wellington Pecka	0	0	0	0	0	0	0	0
MF	(Brazil)	—	Renan Silva	0	0	0	0	0	0	0	0
			Total	60	6	20	5	86	5	166	17

=== Overview ===
Competition	First match	Last match	Starting round	Final position	Record							
Competition	First match	Last match	Starting round	Final position	Pld	W	D	L	GF	GA	GD	Win %
Série A	20 April 2010	5 December 2010	Matchday 1	14th	38	9	17	12	41	44	−3	23.68
Copa Libertadores	24 February 2010	20 May 2010	Group stage	Quarterfinals	10	5	1	4	17	15	+2	50.00
Campeonato Carioca	17 January 2010	18 April 2010	Matchday 1	Runners-up	20	16	2	2	46	22	+24	80.00
Total					68	30	20	18	104	81	+23	44.12

Source: Competitions

== Rio de Janeiro State League ==
=== Taça Guanabara ===
==== Group A ====
Pos	Team	Pld	W	D	L	GF	GA	GD	Pts	Qualification or relegation
1	Flamengo	7	6	1	0	21	13	+8	19	Qualified to Semifinals
2	Fluminense	7	5	1	1	17	5	+12	16	Qualified to Semifinals
3	Olaria	7	3	3	1	14	10	+4	12	Taça Moisés Mathias de Andrade
4	Boavista	7	3	1	3	9	8	+1	10	Taça Moisés Mathias de Andrade
5	Bangu	7	3	0	4	8	11	−3	9	
6	Volta Redonda	7	2	2	3	11	10	+1	8	
7	Americano	7	1	0	6	7	20	−13	3	
8	Duque de Caxias	7	0	2	5	6	16	−10	2	

Source: RSSSF.com
Rules for classification: 1) points; 2) wins; 3) goal difference; 4) number of goals scored.

==== Matches ====
17 January 2010 1	Flamengo	3–2	Duque de Caxias	Maracanã - Rio de Janeiro
17:00 (UTC-3)	Kléberson 50'; Fierro 53'; Fernando 84'; Toró (yellow card) 15'; E. Silva (yellow card) 55'; Álvaro (red card) 60'	(Report)	Maurinho 15'; John 79'; Ale (yellow card) 10'; Juninho (yellow card) 14'	Attendance: 17.521; Referee: Pericles Bassols

20 January 2010 2	Volta Redonda	1–3	Flamengo	Raulino de Oliveira - Volta Redonda
18:30 (UTC-3)	Tássio 71'; Alcir (yellow card) 17'; Márcio Guerreiro (yellow card) 33' (yellow-red card) 78'; Herbert (yellow card) 35'; Washington (red card) 83'; Márcio Loyola (yellow card) 87'	(Report)	Mezenga 36' 42' (yellow card) 17'; Petkovic 72'; Obina (yellow card) 17'; Kléberson (yellow card) 26'; David (yellow card) 62'	Attendance: 8.463; Referee: Luís Antônio Silva dos Santos

23 January 2010 3	Bangu	1–2	Flamengo	Engenhão - Rio de Janeiro
17:00 (UTC-3)	Tiano 45+4'(pen); Uillian Souza (yellow card); Somália (yellow card); Marcão (yellow card); Carlos Renan (yellow card)	(Report)	Vágner Love 18' 45'; Toró (yellow card); Vinícius (yellow card); Álvaro (yellow card)	Attendance: 14.412; Referee: Wagner dos Santos Rosa

27 January 2010 4	Flamengo	3–2	Americano	Maracanã - Rio de Janeiro
19:30 (UTC-3)	Adriano 40'; Fernando 45+5'; Vágner Love 81'; Léo Moura (yellow card) 56' (yellow-red card) 57'	(Report)	Diego Sales 80'; Itacaré 90+1'; Oliosa (yellow card) 39'; Zambi (yellow card) 41'; Leandro Leitte (yellow card) 77'; Jader (yellow card) 90+3'	Attendance: 12.308; Referee: William de Souza Nery

31 January 2010 5	Fluminense	3–5	Flamengo	Maracanã - Rio de Janeiro
19:30 (UTC-3)	Alan 13'; Conca 39'; Cássio 45'; Cássio (yellow card) 4'; Everton (yellow card) 32'; Diguinho (yellow card) 41'; Júlio César (yellow card) 55'; Conca (yellow card) 90+1'	(Report)	Adriano 42' (pen.), 81', 89'; Vágner Love 52'; Kléberson 53'; Juan (yellow card) 5'; Álvaro (yellow card) 36' (yellow-red card) 62'; Willians (yellow card) 69'; Angelim (yellow card) 38'	Attendance: 54.726; Referee: Marcelo de Lima Henrique

3 February 2010 6	Flamengo	3–3	Olaria	Maracanã - Rio de Janeiro
21:50 (UTC-3)	Adriano 6'; Vágner Love 56', 82'; Angelim (yellow card) 50'; David (yellow card) 53'; Toró (yellow card) 61' (yellow-red card) 64'; Michael (yellow card) 45+2'	(Report)	Cacá 5', 64' (pen.); Araruama 58'; Diego (yellow card) 24'; Thiago Eleutério (red card); William (yellow card) 88'	Attendance: 7.772; Referee: Felipe Gomes da Silva

7 February 2010 7	Boavista	1–2	Flamengo	Raulino de Oliveira - Volta Redonda
19:30 (UTC-3)	Edson 56'; Júlio César (yellow card) 10'; Paulo Rodrigues (yellow card) 20'; Léo Faria (yellow card) 53'; Douglas Pedroso (yellow card) 58'; Léo Guerreiro (yellow card) 75'	(Report)	Mezenga 41'; Kléberson 60'; Juan (yellow card) 38'; Léo Moura (yellow card) 66'; Lenon (yellow card) 70'	Attendance: 3.843; Referee: Maurício Machado Junior

=== Semifinal ===
17 February 2010	Flamengo	1–2	Botafogo	Maracanã - Rio de Janeiro
21:50 (UTC-3)	Vinícius 24'; Toró (yellow card) 2'; Álvaro (yellow card) 52'	(Report)	Marcelo Cordeiro 33'; Caio 83'; Fahel (yellow card) 12'; Fábio Ferreira (yellow card) 40'; Abreu (yellow card) 44'; Herrera (yellow card) 61'; Alessandro (yellow card) 76'	Attendance: 37.154; Referee: Luís Antônio Silva dos Santos

=== Taça Rio ===
==== Group A ====
Pos	Team	Pld	W	D	L	GF	GA	GD	Pts	Qualification or relegation
1	Flamengo	8	7	1	0	21	5	+16	22	Qualified to Semifinals
2	Fluminense	8	6	1	1	19	9	+10	19	Qualified to Semifinals
3	Bangu	8	4	2	2	14	11	+3	14	Taça Moisés Mathias de Andrade
4	Boavista	8	4	0	4	14	13	+1	12	Taça Moisés Mathias de Andrade
5	Americano	8	3	2	3	11	12	−1	11	
6	Duque de Caxias	8	3	1	4	10	11	−1	10	
7	Olaria	8	3	0	5	6	11	−5	9	
8	Volta Redonda	8	2	1	5	8	11	−3	7	

Source: RSSSF.com
Rules for classification: 1) points; 2) wins; 3) goal difference; 4) number of goals scored.

==== Matches ====
27 February 2010 1	Macaé	1–4	Flamengo	Raulino de Oliveira - Volta Redonda
19:30 (UTC-3)	Laio 39'; Gedeil (yellow card) 28'; André (yellow card) 34'; Bill (yellow card) 77'; Norton (yellow card) 84'	(Report)	Vágner Love 28', 65'; Vinícius 58', 71'; Léo Moura (yellow card) 35'; Fabrício (yellow card) 62'	Attendance: 1.489; Referee: João Batista de Arruda

3 March 2010 2	Flamengo	2–0	Madureira	Maracanã - Rio de Janeiro
21:50 (UTC-3)	Fernando 14'; Vágner Love 89'; Juan (yellow card) 59'; Toró (yellow card) 38'; Alvim (yellow card) 39'	(Report)	Wagner (yellow card)	Attendance: 5.320; Referee: Wagner do Nascimento Magalhães

6 March 2010 3	Resende	0–4	Flamengo	Raulino de Oliveira - Volta Redonda
19:30 (UTC-3)	Rodrigo Costa (yellow card) 19'; Ramon (yellow card) 43'; Naílton (yellow card) 50' (yellow-red card) 60'	(Report)	Mezenga 37'; Léo Moura 62'; Vinícius 73'; Vágner Love 77'; Juan (yellow card) 11'	Attendance: 1.833; Referee: Carlos Eduardo Nunes Braga

14 March 2010 4	Flamengo	1–0	Vasco da Gama	Maracanã - Rio de Janeiro
19:30 (UTC-3)	Adriano 51' (pen.); Willians (yellow card) 32'; Vágner Love (yellow card) 70'; Alvim (yellow card) 80'; Juan (yellow card) 90'	(Report)	Paulinho (yellow card) 8'; Márcio Careca (yellow card) 40'; Fernando Prass (yellow card) 49'; Gustavo (yellow card) 58'; Fernando (yellow card) 76'; Élder Granja (yellow card) 77'; Titi (red card) 90+'	Attendance: 37.104; Referee: Pericles Bassols

21 March 2010 5	Botafogo	2–2	Flamengo	Engenhão - Rio de Janeiro
19:30 (UTC-3)	Germán Herrera 16', 54'; Marcelo Cordeiro (yellow card) 36'; Somália (yellow card) 52'	(Report)	Adriano 21', 90+3'; Everton Silva (yellow card) 16'; Toró (yellow card) 33'; Álvaro (yellow card) 38'; Willians (yellow card) 78'	Attendance: 9.074; Referee: Wagner do Nascimento Magalhães

24 March 2010 6	Flamengo	3–1	Tigres do Brasil	Engenhão - Rio de Janeiro
19:30 (UTC-3)	Adriano 37', 81'; Vágner Love 52'; David (yellow card)	(Report)	Gilcimar 34'; Denis (yellow card); Zé Carlos (yellow card)	Attendance: 3.118; Referee: Djalma José Beltrami Teixeira

28 March 2010 7	Flamengo	2–1	América	Engenhão - Rio de Janeiro
16:00 (UTC-3)	Adriano 23' (pen.); Vágner Love (yellow card) 39', (goal) 82'; Toró (yellow card) 17'; Fabrício (yellow card) 74'; Petković (yellow card) 88'; Ramón (yellow card) 89'	(Report)	Jones 5'; Claudemir (yellow card) 23'; Jones (red card) 14'; Gérson (red card) 89'	Attendance: 3.218 (only payers); Referee: Rodrigo Nunes de Sá

4 April 2010 8	Friburguense	0–3	Flamengo	Estádio Moça Bonita - Rio de Janeiro
16:00 (UTC-3)	Flávio Santos (yellow card) 3'; Wallace (yellow card) 35'; Lucas (yellow card)	(Report)	Angelim 18'; Denis Marques 33' (pen.); Wallace 33' (o.g.); Fierro (yellow card) 64'; Camacho (yellow card)	Attendance: N/A; Referee: Agnaldo Xavier Farias

=== Semifinal ===
11 April 2010	Flamengo	2–1	Vasco da Gama	Maracanã - Rio de Janeiro
16:00 (UTC-3)	Vágner Love 10' 71'(pen.); Willians (yellow card) 6'; Álvaro (yellow card) 28'; Juan (yellow card) 46' (yellow-red card) 78'; Mezenga (yellow card) 73'; Toró (yellow card) 85'	(Report)	Thiago Martinelli 31'; Fagner (yellow card) 4'; Titi (yellow card) 23'; Thiago Martinelli (yellow card) 49' (yellow-red card) 90+1'; Philippe Coutinho (yellow card) 32'	Attendance: 32.442; Referee: João Batista de Arruda

=== Final ===
18 April 2010	Flamengo	1–2	Botafogo	Maracanã - Rio de Janeiro
16:00 (UTC-3)	Vágner Love 45'; Bruno (yellow card) 12'; Toró (yellow card) 14'; Maldonado (yellow card) 16' (yellow-red card) 71'; Angelim (yellow card) 22'; Vágner Love (yellow card) 55'; Vinícius (yellow card) 66'; Alvim (yellow card) 69'; David (yellow card) 78'; Willians (yellow card) 80'	(Report)	Germán Herrera 23'(pen.); Sebastián Abreu 72'(pen.); Renato Cajá (yellow card) 17'; Somália (yellow card) 26'; Alessandro (yellow card) 29'; Túlio Souza (yellow card) 33'; Leandro Guerreiro (yellow card) 68'; Fahel (yellow card) 75'; Germán Herrera (red card)	Attendance: 60.748; Referee: Gutemberg de Paula Fonseca

== Copa Libertadores ==
=== Group 8 ===
Pos	Team	Pld	W	D	L	GF	GA	GD	Pts	UCH	FLA	UC	CAR
1	Universidad de Chile	6	3	3	0	10	6	+4	12	—	2–1	0–0	1–0
2	(Brazil) Flamengo	6	3	1	2	11	9	+2	10	2–2	—	2–0	3–2
3	(Chile) Universidad Católica	6	1	4	1	5	5	0	7	2–2	2–0	—	1–1
4	(Venezuela) Caracas	6	0	2	4	5	11	−6	2	1–3	1–3	0–0	—

Legend: Blue = home team win; Yellow = draw; Red = away team win.

==== Matches ====
24 February 2010 1	Flamengo	2–0	Universidad Católica	Maracanã - Rio de Janeiro (Brazil)
21:50 (UTC-3)	Léo Moura 10'; Adriano 58'; Willians (red card) 2'; Vágner Love (yellow card) 30'		Francisco Silva (yellow card) 9'; Milovan Mirosevic (red card) 42'; Waldo Ponce (yellow card) 53'	Attendance: 29.107; Referee: Carlos Amarilla (Paraguay)

10 March 2010 2	Caracas	1–3	Flamengo	Estadio Olímpico de la UCV - Caracas (Venezuela)
21:50 (UTC-3)	Rafael Castellín 65'; Zamir Valoyes (yellow card) 5'; Giovanny Romero (yellow card) 35'; Rafael Castellín (yellow card) 54'	(Report)	Vágner Love 35'(pen.) 74'; Alvim 90+2'; Toró (yellow card) 15' (yellow-red card) 53'; Bruno (yellow card) 83'	Attendance: 20,000; Referee: Wilmar Roldán (Colombia)

17 March 2010 3	Universidad de Chile	2–1	Flamengo	Estadio Monumental, Santiago (Chile)
21:50 (UTC-3)	Eduardo Vargas 42'; Felipe Seymour 54'; Eduardo Vargas (yellow card) 42'	(Report)	Alvim 50'; Álvaro (yellow card) 43'; Fierro (yellow card) 68'	Attendance: 25,000; Referee: Jorge Larrionda (Uruguay)

8 April 2010 4	Flamengo	2–2	Universidad de Chile	Maracanã - Rio de Janeiro (Brazil)
21:50 (16:00) (UTC-3)	Michael 82'; Léo Moura 67'; Vinícius (yellow card); Vágner Love (yellow card); Bruno (yellow card)	(Report)	Walter Montillo 40'; Matías Rodríguez 90+1'; Manuel Iturra (yellow card); José Manuel Rojas (yellow card); Matías Rodríguez (yellow card)	Attendance: 15.361; Referee: Roberto Silvera (Uruguay)

14 April 2010 5	Universidad Católica	2–0	Flamengo	Estadio San Carlos de Apoquindo - Santiago (Chile)
21:50 (UTC-3)	Damián Díaz 2'; Francisco Silva 45'; Waldo Ponce (yellow card) 67'	(Report)		Attendance: 12.000; Referee: Sergio Pezzota (Argentina)

21 April 2010 6	Flamengo	3–2	Caracas	Maracanã - Rio de Janeiro (Brazil)
21:50 (UTC-3)	Angelim 17'; Michael 18'; David 75'; Willians (yellow card) 13'; Michael (yellow card) 44'	(Report)	Rafael Castellín 14'; Jesús Gómez 67'; Alejandro Cichero (yellow card) 54'; Giovanny Romero (yellow card) 81'	Attendance: 34,106; Referee: Jorge Larrionda (Uruguay)

== Knockout stages ==
=== Round of 16 ===
28 April 2010 First leg	Flamengo	1–0	Corinthians	Maracanã - Rio de Janeiro (Brazil)
21:50 (UTC-3)	Adriano (pen.) 63'; Michael (yellow card) 29' (yellow-red card) 36'; Fierro (yellow card) 89'	(Report)	Roberto Carlos (yellow card) 60'	Attendance: 72.442; Referee: Carlos Amarilla (Paraguay)

5 May 2010 Second leg	Corinthians	2–1 (2–a2 agg.)	Flamengo	Estádio do Pacaembu - São Paulo (Brazil)
21:50 (UTC-3)	David (o.g.) 27'; Ronaldo 39'; Iarley (yellow card) 86'	(Report)	Vágner Love 49'; Juan (yellow card) 12'; David (yellow card) 33'; Willians (yellow card) 42'; Bruno (yellow card) 81'	Attendance: 35.561 (only payers); Referee: Roberto Silvera (Uruguay)

=== Quarterfinals ===
13 May 2010 First leg	Flamengo	2–3	Universidad de Chile	Maracanã, Rio de Janeiro
19:30 (UTC-3)	Adriano 39'; Juan 88'; Bruno (yellow card) 25'; Juan (yellow card) 52'; David (yellow card) 67'	(Report)	Mauricio Victorino 4'; Rafael Olarra 24'; Álvaro Fernández 47'; Manuel Iturra (yellow card) 10' (yellow-red card) 45+1'; Eduardo Vargas (yellow card) 31'	Attendance: 61.643 (only payers); Referee: Carlos Amarilla (Paraguay)

20 May 2010 Second leg	Universidad de Chile	1–2 (4a–4 agg.)	Flamengo	Estadio Santa Laura, Santiago (Chile)
22:15 (UTC-3)	Vágner Love 45'; Adriano 77'; Juan (yellow card) 24'; Willians (yellow card) 65' (yellow-red card) 90'; Vágner Love (red card) after match	(Report)	Walter Montillo 73'; Matías Rodríguez (yellow card) 44'; Nelson Pinto (yellow card) 71'; Walter Montillo (yellow card) 75'	Referee: Roberto Silvera (Uruguay)

== Brazilian Série A ==
=== League table ===
Pos	Team	Pld	W	D	L	GF	GA	GD	Pts	Qualification or relegation
12	Ceará	38	10	17	11	35	44	−9	47	2011 Copa Sudamericana Second Stage
13	Atlético Mineiro	38	13	6	19	52	64	−12	45	2011 Copa Sudamericana Second Stage
14	Flamengo	38	9	17	12	41	44	−3	44	2011 Copa Sudamericana Second Stage
15	Avaí	38	11	10	17	49	58	−9	43	
16	Atlético Goianiense	38	11	9	18	51	57	−6	42	

Rules for classification: 1st points; 2nd wins; 3rd goal difference; 4th goals scored; 5th head-to-head results; 6th least red cards received; 7th least yellow cards received; 8th draw

==== Results summary ====
Overall								Home						Away					
Pld	W	D	L	GF	GA	GD	Pts	W	D	L	GF	GA	GD	W	D	L	GF	GA	GD
38	9	17	12	41	44	−3	44	6	9	4	24	19	+5	3	8	8	17	25	−8

Last updated: 2010-12-04.
Source: Série A 2010

Pld=Matches played; W=Matches won; D=Matches drawn; L=Matches lost;

==== Matches ====
9 May 2010 1	Flamengo	1–1	São Paulo	Maracanã - Rio de Janeiro
16:00 (UTC-3)	Denis Marques 51'; Juan (yellow card) 9'; E. Silva (yellow card) 57'	(Report)	Washington 44'; Marcelinho Paraíba (yellow card) 62'	Attendance: 11.125; Referee: Leandro Vuaden

15 May 2010 2	Vitória	1–1	Flamengo	Barradão - Salvador
18:30 (UTC-3)	Elkeson 85'; Vilson (yellow card) 37'; Neto Berola (yellow card) 58'; Elkeson (yellow card) 87'	(Report)	Vágner Love 2'	Attendance: 14.862; Referee: Paulo César de Oliveira

23 May 2010 3	Flamengo	3–1	Grêmio Prudente	Maracanã - Rio de Janeiro
18:30 (UTC-3)	Vágner Love 45'(p.k.) 90'(p.k.); Juan 87'; David (yellow card) 33'; Michael (yellow card) 48'; Camacho (yellow card) 58'	(Report)	Wanderley 48'; Dênis (yellow card) 16'; João Vitor (yellow card) 22'; Diego (yellow card) 45+1'; Marcelo Oliveira (yellow card) 66'; Anderson (yellow card) 68'; Paulão (yellow card) 88'	Attendance: 7.747; Referee: Francisco Carlos Nascimento

26 May 2010 4	Fluminense	2–1	Flamengo	Maracanã - Rio de Janeiro
19:30 (UTC-3)	Rodriguinho; Darío Conca 55'; Gum (yellow card) 51'	(Report)	Bruno 90'; Léo Moura (yellow card) 19'; David (yellow card) 23'; Toró (yellow card) 41'; Fernando (red card); Camacho (yellow card) 83'; Angelim (yellow card) 90+2'	Attendance: 18.985; Referee: Marcelo de Lima Henrique

29 May 2010 5	Flamengo	1–1	Grêmio	Maracanã - Rio de Janeiro
18:30 (UTC-3)	Petković 7'; David (yellow card) 38'; Camacho (yellow card) 66'; Ramón (yellow card) 79'	(Report)	Rodrigo 51'; Adílson (yellow card) 41'; Bruno Collaço (yellow card) 82'	Attendance: 11.547; Referee: Wilton Sampaio

2 June 2010 6	Palmeiras	0–1	Flamengo	Estádio do Pacaembu - São Paulo
21:50 (UTC-3)	Pierre (yellow card) 69'; Patrik (yellow card) 76'	(Report)	Vágner Love 87'; Álvaro (yellow card) 90+1'	Attendance: 8.457 (payers only); Referee: Leonardo Gaciba da Silva

5 June 2010 7	Flamengo	1–2	Goiás	Maracanã - Rio de Janeiro
18:30 (UTC-3)	Toró 50'; Toró (yellow card) 77'; Welinton (yellow card) 83'; Fernando (yellow card) 90+1'; Camacho (yellow card) 90+3'	(Report)	Hugo 84'; Otacílio Neto 86'; Toloi (yellow card) 31'; Wellington Monteiro (yellow card) 21'	Attendance: 11.855 (only payers); Referee: Francisco de Assis Almeida Filho

14 July 2010 8	Flamengo	1–0	Botafogo	Maracanã - Rio de Janeiro
21:00 (UTC-3)	Paulo Sérgio 68'; Kléberson (yellow card) 26'; Paulo Sérgio (yellow card) 70'	(Report)	Fábio Ferreira (yellow card) 25'; Antônio Carlos (yellow card) 80'	Attendance: 20.076; Referee: Péricles Bassols

18 July 2010 9	Atlético Goianiense	0–1	Flamengo	Estádio Serra Dourada - Goiânia
16:00 (UTC-3)	Pituca (yellow card) 14'; Wélton Felipe (yellow card) 47'	(Report)	Petković 37'(p.k.); Juan (yellow card) 59'; Welinton (yellow card) 90+3'	Attendance: 4.530 (only payers); Referee: Paulo César de Oliveira

21 July 2010 10	Flamengo	1–1	Avaí	Maracanã - Rio de Janeiro
21:00 (UTC-3)	Diego Maurício 7'; Welinton (yellow card) 53'; Kléberson (yellow card) 73'; Borja (yellow card) 77'; Camacho (yellow card) 84'	(Report)	Gabriel 74'; Marcos (yellow card) 79'; Patric (yellow card) 85'	Attendance: 19.085; Referee: Jailson Macedo Freitas

25 July 2010 11	Internacional	1–0	Flamengo	Estádio Beira-Rio - Porto Alegre
16:00 (UTC-3)	Taison 4'; Taison (yellow card) 34'; Daniel (yellow card) 51'; Tinga (yellow card) 66'; Éverton (yellow card) 70'; Juan (yellow card) 79'; Giuliano (yellow card) 90+1'	(Report)	Jean (yellow card) 13'; Vinícius (yellow card) 40'	Attendance: 25.002; Referee: Wilson Luiz Seneme

1 August 2010 12	Flamengo	0–0	Vasco da Gama	Maracanã - Rio de Janeiro
18:30 (UTC-3)	Kleberson (yellow card) 37'; Jean (yellow card) 44'; Corrêa (yellow card) 51'	(Report)	Zé Roberto (yellow card) 10'; Rômulo (yellow card) 52'; Fernando (yellow card) 90+2'	Attendance: 60.202; Referee: Péricles Bassols

8 August 2010 13	Corinthians	1–0	Flamengo	Estádio do Pacaembu - São Paulo
16:00 (UTC-3)	Elias 39'	(Report)	Jean (yellow card) 69'	Attendance: 29.222 (only payers); Referee: Héber Lopes

14 August 2010 14	Flamengo	1–0	Ceará	Maracanã - Rio de Janeiro
18:30 (UTC-3)	Petković 45'(p.k.); Petković (yellow card) 23'; Willians (yellow card) 35'; Renato (yellow card) 70'; Corrêa (yellow card) 72'; Lomba (yellow card) 89'	(Report)	Michel (yellow card) 9'; Anderson (yellow card) 21'	Attendance: 27.393; Referee: Wagner Reway

22 August 2010 15	Atlético Paranaense	1–0	Flamengo	Arena da Baixada - Curitiba
16:00 (UTC-3)	Manoel 82'; Bruno Mineiro (yellow card) 13'; Paulo Baier (yellow card) 84'	(Report)	Borja (yellow card) 60'; Willians (yellow card) 74'	Attendance: 23.010; Referee: Carlos Eugênio Simon

26 August 2010 16	Flamengo	0–0	Atlético Mineiro	Maracanã - Rio de Janeiro
21:00 (UTC-3)		(Report)		Attendance: 13.323; Referee: Salvio Spinola Fagundes

29 August 2010 17	Guarani	2–1	Flamengo	Estádio Brinco de Ouro - Campinas
16:00 (UTC-3)	Jean 45+2'; Lomba (yellow card) 34'; Toró (yellow card) 60'; Léo Moura (yellow card) 71'; Galhardo (yellow card) 76'	(Report)	Geovane 90+1'; Reinaldo 90+3'; Mazola (yellow card) 44'	Attendance: 10.317; Referee: Arilson Anunciação

1 September 2010 18	Cruzeiro	1–0	Flamengo	Estádio Parque do Sabiá - Uberlândia
21:50 (UTC-3)	Robert 9'; Diego Renan (yellow card) 3'; Jonathan (yellow card) 42'; Fabrício (yellow card) 51'	(Report)	Corrêa (yellow card) 70'; Jean (red card); Fernando (yellow card) 84'	Attendance: N/A; Referee: Guilherme Cereta de Lima

5 September 2010 19	Flamengo	0–0	Santos	Maracanã - Rio de Janeiro
16:00 (UTC-3)	Angelim (yellow card) 50'	(Report)	Durval (yellow card) 36'	Attendance: 43.350; Referee: Leandro Vuaden

8 September 2010 20	São Paulo	2–0	Flamengo	Estádio do Morumbi - São Paulo
21:50 (UTC-3)	Marlos 8'; Fernandão 41'; Cléber Santana (yellow card) 14'; Richarlyson (yellow card) 45'; Renato Silva (yellow card) 69'; Miranda (yellow card) 81'; Ilsinho (yellow card) 85'; Xandão (yellow card) 90+4'	(Report)	Toró (yellow card) 25'; Diogo (yellow card) 38' (yellow-red card) 39'; Léo Moura (yellow card) 90'	Attendance: 14.389 (only payers); Referee: Alício Pena Júnior

12 September 2010 21	Flamengo	2–2	Vitória	Estádio Raulino de Oliveira - Volta Redonda
18:30 (UTC-3)	Kleberson 78' 84'; Val Baiano (yellow card) 30'	(Report)	Júnior 70'; Schwenck 83'; Júnior (yellow card) 72'; Léo (yellow card) 77'; Vanderson (yellow card) 90+4'	Attendance: 3.895 (only payers); Referee: Luiz Flavio de Oliveira

15 September 2010 22	Grêmio Prudente	1–2	Flamengo	Estádio Eduardo José Farah - Presidente Prudente
21:50 (UTC-3)	Adriano Pimenta 45'; Cleidson (yellow card) 12'; Adriano Pimenta (yellow card) 34' (yellow-red card) 45+1'; Marcelo Oliveira (yellow card) 75'	(Report)	Diego Maurício 85'; Toró 90+4'; Diogo (yellow card) 43'; Maldonado (yellow card) 80'	Attendance: 3.815 (only payers); Referee: Ricardo Marques Ribeiro

19 September 2010 23	Flamengo	3–3	Fluminense	Engenhão - Rio de Janeiro
18:30 (UTC-3)	Deivid 22'; David Braz 39'; Renato 65'; Willians (yellow card) 43'; Jean (yellow card) 90+1'	(Report)	Leandro Euzebio 8'; Rodriguinho 63' 72'; Mariano (yellow card) 52'	Attendance: 18.911; Referee: Guttemberg de Paula Fonseca

22 September 2010 24	Grêmio	2–2	Flamengo	Estádio Olímpico - Porto Alegre
21:50 (UTC-3)	Douglas 6'; Jonas 54'; Rafael Marques (yellow card) 90'	(Report)	Kleberson 33'; Petković 85'; Deivid (yellow card) 48'; Léo Moura (yellow card) 90+3'	Attendance: 24.968; Referee: Sandro Meira Ricci

25 September 2010 25	Flamengo	1–3	Palmeiras	Engenhão - Rio de Janeiro
18:30 (UTC-3)	Petković 79'(p.k.); David Braz (yellow card) 19'; Jean (yellow card) 39'; Willians (yellow card) 90+2'	(Report)	Kléber 19'(p.k.) 29'; Lincoln 89'; Kléber (yellow card) 24'; Jorge Valdivia (yellow card) 59'; Fabrício (yellow card) 69'; Vítor (yellow card) 78'	Attendance: 9.894 (only payers); Referee: André Luiz Castro

28 September 2010 26	Goiás	1–1	Flamengo	Estádio Serra Dourada - Goiânia
21:00 (UTC-3)	Jean 47'(o.g.); Marcão (yellow card) 36'; Júnior (yellow card) 55'; Rafael Moura (red card)	(Report)	Deivid 90'; Maldonado (yellow card) 18'; Juan (yellow card) 81'	Attendance: 13.898 (only payers); Referee: Paulo César Oliveira

3 October 2010 27	Botafogo	1–1	Flamengo	Engenhão - Rio de Janeiro
18:30 (UTC-3)	Lúcio Flávio 35'; Alessandro (yellow card) 37' (yellow-red card) 74'; Marcelo Cordeiro (yellow card) 57'; Fábio Ferreira (yellow card) 59'; Márcio Rozário (yellow card) 90+1'	(Report)	Léo Moura 75'; Renato (yellow card) 25' (yellow-red card) 77'; Jean (yellow card) 44'; Diogo (yellow card) 45+1'; Willians (yellow card) 66'	Attendance: 16.367; Referee: Ricardo Gutemberg de Paula Fonseca

6 October 2010 28	Flamengo	2–0	Atlético Goianiense	Estádio Raulino de Oliveira - Volta Redonda
21:00 (UTC-3)	Val Baiano 75'; Diego Maurício 81'; Petković (yellow card) 25'; Deivid (yellow card) 31'	(Report)	Robston (yellow card) 25'; Pituca (yellow card) 31'; Daniel Marques (yellow card) 78'	Attendance: 10.015; Referee: Marcio Chagas da Silva

10 October 2010 29	Avaí	2–2	Flamengo	Estádio da Ressacada - Florianópolis
16:00 (UTC-3)	Émerson 53'; Roberto 59'; Caio (yellow card) 7'; Émerson (yellow card) 69'; Rudnei (red card)	(Report)	Val Baiano 14' 16'; Léo Moura (yellow card) 22' (yellow-red card) 57'; Willians (yellow card) 31'; Juan (yellow card) 34'; David Braz (red card)	Attendance: N/A; Referee: Evandro Rogério Roman

16 October 2010 30	Flamengo	3–0	Internacional	Engenhão - Rio de Janeiro
18:30 (UTC-3)	Deivid 14'(p.k.) 47'; Renato 38'; Corrêa (yellow card) 76'	(Report)	Índio (yellow card) 12'	Attendance: 13.423; Referee: Wilson Luiz Seneme

24 October 2010 31	Vasco da Gama	1–1	Flamengo	Engenhão - Rio de Janeiro
18:30 (UTC-3)	Cesinha 26'; Dedé (red card); Felipe (yellow card) 66'; Éder Luís (yellow card) 83'	(Report)	Renato 80'; Marquinhos (yellow card) 73'; Renato (yellow card) 84'	Attendance: 26.006; Referee: Gutemberg de Paula Fonseca

27 October 2010 32	Flamengo	1–1	Corinthians	Engenhão - Rio de Janeiro
22:00 (UTC-3)	Diogo 46'; Maldonado (yellow card) 14'	(Report)	Ronaldo 30'; Ralf (yellow card) 64'	Attendance: 12.094; Referee: Sandro Meira Ricci

3 November 2010 33	Ceará	2–2	Flamengo	Estádio do Castelão - Fortaleza
21:50 (UTC-3)	Magno Alves 27' 81'; Geraldo (yellow card) 50'	(Report)	Welinton 2'; Angelim 67'; Willians (yellow card) 32'	Attendance: N/A; Referee: Paulo César Oliveira

7 November 2010 34	Flamengo	0–1	Atlético Paranaense	Estádio Raulino de Oliveira - Volta Redonda
19:30 (UTC-3)	Negueba (yellow card) 26'; Maldonado (yellow card) 37'; Deivid (yellow card) 37'; Renato (yellow card) 45+1'	(Report)	Paulo Baier 39'(p.k.); Paulinho (yellow card) 43'; Deivid (yellow card) 57'; Federico Nieto (yellow card) 66'; Iván González (yellow card) 70'	Attendance: 9.026; Referee: José Henrique de Carvalho

13 November 2010 35	Atlético Mineiro	4–1	Flamengo	Arena do Jacaré - Sete Lagoas
19:30 (UTC-3)	Obina 35'; Renan Oliveira 44' 69'; Diego Tardelli 67'; Réver (yellow card) 79'	(Report)	Marquinhos 74'	Attendance: N/A; Referee: Márcio Chagas da Silva

20 November 2010 36	Flamengo	2–1	Guarani	Engenhão - Rio de Janeiro
19:30 (UTC-3)	Renato 2'; Diego Maurício 33'; Léo Moura (yellow card) 41'; Willians (yellow card) 62'; Juan (yellow card) 64'; Diego Maurício (yellow card) 66'	(Report)	Baiano 12'; Preto (yellow card) 22'; Geovane (yellow card) 90+1'	Attendance: 39.720; Referee: Wilton Sampaio

28 November 2010 37	Flamengo	1–2	Cruzeiro	Estádio Raulino de Oliveira - Volta Redonda
17:00 (UTC-3)	Diego Maurício 4'; Diogo (yellow card) 49'	(Report)	Roger 15'; Thiago Ribeiro 69'; Marquinhos Paraná (yellow card) 10'; Jonathan (yellow card) 80'; Henrique (yellow card) 90+1'	Attendance: 16.985; Referee: Leandro Vuaden

5 December 2010 38	Santos	0–0	Flamengo	Estádio Vila Belmiro - Santos
17:00 (UTC-3)	Rodriguinho (yellow card) 59'	(Report)	Juan (yellow card) 74'	Attendance: 9.086 (only payers); Referee: Evandro Rogério Roman

== Honours ==
=== Individuals ===
Name	Number	Country	Award
Leonardo Moura	2	(Brazil)	Série A Right Back 2nd best
Willians	8	(Brazil)	Série A Defensive Midfielder 3rd best

== IFFHS ranking ==
Flamengo position on the Club World Ranking during the 2010 season, according to IFFHS.

Month	Position	Points
January	110	116,0
February	82	130,0
March	70	144,0
April	37	179,0
May	38	181,0
June	37	179,0
July	43	171,0
August	50	157,0
September	47	163,0
October	48	161,0
November	61	149,0
December	62	147,0

Last updated: 2011-01-19.
Source: IFFHS
