= 2010 Botafogo FR season =

Botafogo
2010 season
- Manager: Joel Santana
- Stadium: Estádio Olímpico João Havelange
- Série A: 6th
- Campeonato Carioca: Winners
- Copa do Brasil: Second round
- Top goalscorer: League: Sebastián Abreu (11); All: Sebastián Abreu (14)
- Average home league attendance: 16,191
- Biggest defeat: Botafogo 0–6 Vasco da Gama

The 2010 season was the 106th in the history of Botafogo de Futebol e Regatas and their seventh consecutive campaign in the Campeonato Brasileiro Série A, the premier division of Brazilian football.

== Competitions ==
=== Overall record ===
Competition	First match	Last match	Starting round	Final position	Record							
Competition	First match	Last match	Starting round	Final position	Pld	W	D	L	GF	GA	GD	Win %
Campeonato Brasileiro Série A	8 May 2010	5 December 2010	Matchday 1	6th	38	14	17	7	54	42	+12	36.84
Campeonato Carioca	16 January 2010	18 April 2010	Taça Guanabara	Winners	19	15	2	2	44	26	+18	78.95
Copa do Brasil	11 February 2010	1 April 2010	First round	Second round	4	2	0	2	7	7	+0	50.00
Total					61	31	19	11	105	75	+30	50.82

Source: Competitions

=== Série A ===
==== League table ====
Pos	Team	Pld	W	D	L	GF	GA	GD	Pts	Qualification or relegation
4	Grêmio	38	17	12	9	68	43	+25	63	2011 Copa Libertadores First Stage
5	Atlético Paranaense	38	17	9	12	43	45	−2	60	2011 Copa Sudamericana Second Stage
6	Botafogo	38	14	17	7	54	42	+12	59	2011 Copa Sudamericana Second Stage
7	Internacional	38	16	10	12	48	41	+7	58	2011 Copa Libertadores Second Stage (Note: Internacional qualified as the 2010 Copa Libertadores champion.)
8	Santos	38	15	11	12	63	50	+13	56	2011 Copa Libertadores Second Stage (Note: Santos qualified as the 2010 Copa do Brasil champion.)

Rules for classification: 1st points; 2nd wins; 3rd goal difference; 4th goals scored; 5th head-to-head results; 6th least red cards received; 7th least yellow cards received; 8th draw

==== Results summary ====
Overall								Home						Away					
Pld	W	D	L	GF	GA	GD	Pts	W	D	L	GF	GA	GD	W	D	L	GF	GA	GD
38	14	17	7	54	42	+12	59	8	10	1	32	19	+13	6	7	6	22	23	−1

==== Results by round ====
Round	1	2	3	4	5	6	7	8	9	10	11	12	13	14	15	16	17	18	19	20	21	22	23	24	25	26	27	28	29	30	31	32	33	34	35	36	37	38
Ground	H	A	H	A	H	A	H	A	H	A	H	A	H	A	H	H	A	A	H	A	H	A	H	A	H	A	H	A	H	A	H	A	H	A	A	H	H	A
Result	D	W	W	L	D	L	D	L	D	D	D	W	W	W	W	W	L	W	D	W	W	L	D	D	D	D	D	D	D	D	W	W	W	D	D	L	W	L
Position	8	3	3	6	5	8	8	14	15	15	17	10	8	5	4	4	5	4	5	4	3	5	6	4	6	7	7	7	6	8	6	4	4	4	5	6	5	6

A = Away; H = Home; W = Win; D = Draw; L = Loss

==== Matches ====
8 May 2010 1	Botafogo	3–3	Santos

15 May 2010 2	São Paulo	1–2	Botafogo

22 May 2010 3	Botafogo	3–0	Goiás

27 May 2010 4	Cruzeiro	1–0	Botafogo

30 May 2010 5	Botafogo	1–1	Vasco da Gama

2 June 2010 6	Atlético Paranaense	3–2	Botafogo

6 June 2010 7	Botafogo	2–2	Corinthians

15 July 2010 8	Flamengo	1–0	Botafogo

18 July 2010 9	Botafogo	1–1	Guarani

23 July 2010 10	Palmeiras	2–2	Botafogo

25 July 2010 11	Botafogo	1–1	Fluminense

1 August 2010 12	Vitória	1–3	Botafogo

7 August 2010 13	Botafogo	3–0	Atlético Mineiro

14 August 2010 14	Atlético Goianiense	0–2	Botafogo

21 August 2010 15	Botafogo	1–0	Avaí

25 August 2010 16	Botafogo	1–0	Ceará

28 August 2010 17	Internacional	1–0	Botafogo

1 September 2010 18	Grêmio Prudente	0–1	Botafogo

4 September 2010 19	Botafogo	2–2	Grêmio Porto Alegre

10 September 2010 20	Santos	0–1	Botafogo

12 September 2010 21	Botafogo	2–0	São Paulo

15 September 2010 22	Goiás	4–1	Botafogo

18 September 2010 23	Botafogo	2–2	Cruzeiro

23 September 2010 24	Vasco da Gama	2–2	Botafogo

26 September 2010 25	Botafogo	1–1	Atlético Paranaense

30 September 2010 26	Corinthians	1–1	Botafogo

2 October 2010 27	Botafogo	1–1	Flamengo

6 October 2010 28	Guarani	1–1	Botafogo

10 October 2010 29	Botafogo	0–0	Palmeiras

17 October 2010 30	Fluminense	0–0	Botafogo

23 October 2010 31	Botafogo	1–0	Vitória

30 October 2010 32	Atlético Mineiro	0–2	Botafogo

3 November 2010 33	Botafogo	3–2	Atlético Goianiense

7 November 2010 34	Avaí	0–0	Botafogo

10 November 2010 35	Ceará	2–2	Botafogo

21 November 2010 36	Botafogo	1–2	Internacional

28 November 2010 37	Botafogo	3–1	Grêmio Prudente

5 December 2010 38	Grêmio Porto Alegre	3–0	Botafogo

=== Campeonato Carioca ===
==== Taça Guanabara ====
16 January 2010 1	Macaé	2–3	Botafogo

21 January 2010 2	Botafogo	2–0	Friburguense

24 January 2010 3	Botafogo	0–6	Vasco da Gama

27 January 2010 4	Tigres do Brasil	1–2	Botafogo

30 January 2010 5	Botafogo	2–1	America-RJ

4 February 2010 6	Madureira	1–4	Botafogo

7 February 2010 7	Botafogo	5–2	Resende

17 February 2010 Semi-finals	Flamengo	1–2	Botafogo

21 February 2010 Final	Vasco da Gama	0–2	Botafogo

==== Taça Rio ====
27 February 2010 1	Americano	1–3	Botafogo	Campos dos Goytacazes
18:30 UTC−3				Stadium: Estádio Godofredo Cruz; Referee: Pericles Bassols Pegado Cortez

5 March 2010 2	Botafogo	2–1	Duque de Caxias	Rio de Janeiro
20:50 UTC−3				Stadium: Estádio Olímpico João Havelange; Referee: Pathrice Wallace Correa Maia

7 March 2010 3	Fluminense	2–1	Botafogo	Rio de Janeiro
18:30 UTC−3	Fred 61'; Mariano 83'	Report	Herrera 36' (pen.)	Stadium: Maracanã; Referee: Rodrigo Nunes de Sá

14 March 2010 4	Botafogo	2–0	Olaria	Rio de Janeiro
16:00 UTC−3	Antônio Carlos 19'; Gabriel 49'	Report		Stadium: Estádio Olímpico João Havelange; Referee: Grazianni Maciel Rocha

21 March 2010 5	Botafogo	2–2	Flamengo	Rio de Janeiro
18:30 UTC−3	Herrera 16' (pen.), 54'	Report	Adriano 20', 90+3'	Stadium: Estádio Olímpico João Havelange; Referee: Wagner do Nascimento Magalhaes

25 March 2010 6	Volta Redonda	0–1	Botafogo	Volta Redonda
18:30 UTC−3		Report	Caio Canedo 87'	Stadium: Estádio Raulino de Oliveira; Referee: Gutemberg de Paula Fonseca

29 March 2010 7	Boavista	1–4	Botafogo	Rio de Janeiro
19:30 UTC−3		Report		Stadium: São Januário; Referee: Joao Batista de Arruda

4 April 2010 8	Botafogo	2–2	Bangu	Rio de Janeiro
16:00 UTC−3		Report		Stadium: Estádio Olímpico João Havelange; Referee: Marcelo Venito Pacheco

10 April 2010 Semi-finals	Botafogo	3–2	Fluminense	Rio de Janeiro
18:30 UTC−3		Report		Stadium: Maracanã; Referee: Pericles Bassols Pegado Cortez

18 April 2010 Final	Flamengo	1–2	Botafogo	Rio de Janeiro
16:00 UTC−3	Bruno (yellow card) 12'; Toró (yellow card) 14'; Maldonado (yellow card) 16' (red card) 71'; Ronaldo Angelim (yellow card) 22'; Vágner Love 45', (yellow card) 55'; Vinícius Pacheco (yellow card) 67'; Rodrigo Alvim (yellow card) 69'; David Braz (yellow card) 79'; Willians (yellow card) 81'	Report	Renato Cajá (yellow card) 17'; Herrera 23' (pen.), (yellow card) 76' (red card) 76'; Somália (yellow card) 25'; Alessandro (yellow card) 28'; Túlio Souza (yellow card) 33'; Fábio Ferreira (yellow card) 47'; Guerreiro (yellow card) 68'; Fahel (yellow card) 76'; Abreu 71' (pen.)	Stadium: Maracanã; Referee: Gutemberg de Paula Fonseca

=== Copa do Brasil ===
==== First round ====
11 February 2010 First leg	São Raimundo	1–0	Botafogo	Santarém
	Branco 69'			Stadium: Estádio Municipal Colosso do Tapajós; Attendance: 12,768; Referee: Wilton Sampaio

12 March 2010 Second leg	Botafogo	4–3 (4–4 agg.)	São Raimundo	Rio de Janeiro
	Morais 15'; Abreu (yellow card) 27', (goal) 73', 83'; Silva 64'; Leandro Guerreiro (yellow card) 65'; Somália (red card) 81'		Irailton (yellow card) 15'; Humberto (yellow card) 28'; Carlão (yellow card) 48'; Branco 63'; Filho (yellow card) 65'; Paraíba 76', 89'	Stadium: Estádio Olímpico João Havelange; Attendance: 2,841; Referee: Paulo Henrique de Godoy Bezerra

==== Second round ====
17 March 2010 First leg	Santa Cruz	0–1	Botafogo	Recife
18:30 UTC−3	Allyson (yellow card) 48'		Sandro Silva (yellow card) 9' (yellow-red card) 68'; Herrera 46'	Stadium: Estádio do Arruda; Referee: Paulo César de Oliveira

1 April 2010 Second leg	Botafogo	2–3 (3–3(a) agg.)	Santa Cruz	Rio de Janeiro
21:30 UTC−3	Herrera 20', 85'		Léo Bartholo 7'; Brasão 70'; Ednilton Souza 89'	Stadium: Estádio Olímpico João Havelange; Referee: Wilton Sampaio
