= List of Campeonato Brasileiro Série A hat-tricks =

This is a list of hat-tricks scored in the Campeonato Brasileiro Série A.

== Hat-tricks ==
Key
Player (X)	Player name (count of multiple hat-tricks if applicable)
^{4}	Player scored four goals
^{5}	Player scored five goals
^{6}	Player scored six goals
^{H}	Home team
^{A}	Away team

=== List of Hat-tricks ===
As of 14 June 2026

Player	Nationality	For	Against	Result	Date	Ref.
2009 season
Weldon (1)	Brazil	Sport Recife	Flamengo	4–2 (H)	7 June 2009	
Adriano (1)	Brazil	Flamengo	Internacional	4–0 (H)	21 June 2009	
Luis Bolaños (1)	Ecuador	Internacional	Coritiba	3–0 (H)	28 June 2009	
Ronaldo (1)	Brazil	Corinthians	Fluminense	4–2 (H)	8 July 2009	
Val Baiano^{4} (1)	Brazil	Grêmio Prudente	Náutico	4–0 (H)	19 July 2009	
Obina (1)	Brazil	Palmeiras	Corinthians	3–0 (A)	26 July 2009	
Alecsandro (1)	Brazil	Internacional	Santos	3–3 (A)	26 July 2009	
Wellington Paulista (1)	Brazil	Cruzeiro	Náutico	4–2 (H)	20 August 2009	
Obina (2)	Brazil	Palmeiras	Goiás	4–0 (H)	29 October 2009	
Val Baiano (2)	Brazil	Grêmio Prudente	Botafogo	3–0 (H)	15 November 2009	
Washington (1)	Brazil	São Paulo	Sport Recife	4–0 (H)	6 December 2009	
2010 season
Emerson (1)	Brazil	Avaí	Grêmio Prudente	6–1 (H)	9 May 2010	
Schwenck (1)	Brazil	Vitória	Atlético Mineiro	4–3 (H)	26 May 2010	
Dagoberto (1)	Brazil	São Paulo	Grêmio	3–1 (H)	6 June 2010	
Elias (1)	Brazil	Atlético Goianiense	Palmeiras	3–0 (A)	26 August 2010	
Zé Eduardo (1)	Brazil	Santos	Fluminense	3–0 (A)	26 August 2010	
Jonas (1)	Brazil	Grêmio	Grêmio Prudente	4–0 (H)	6 October 2010	
Ricardo Oliveira (1)	Brazil	São Paulo	Grêmio Prudente	3–2 (A)	9 October 2010	
Obina (3)	Brazil	Atlético Mineiro	Cruzeiro	4–3 (A)	24 October 2010	
Neymar (1)	Brazil	Santos	Goiás	4–1 (A)	21 November 2010	
Caio (1)	Brazil	Avaí	Santos	3–2 (H)	28 November 2010	
2011 season
Anderson Aquino (1)	Brazil	Coritiba	Vasco da Gama	5–1 (H)	5 July 2011	
Liédson (1)	Portugal	Corinthians	São Paulo	5–0 (H)	26 July 2011	
Ronaldinho (1)	Brazil	Flamengo	Santos	5–4 (A)	27 July 2011	
André Lima (1)	Brazil	Grêmio	Athletico Paranaense	4–0 (H)	4 September 2011	
Leandro Damião (1)	Brazil	Internacional	Palmeiras	3–0 (A)	11 September 2011	
Diego Souza (1)	Brazil	Vasco da Gama	Cruzeiro	3–0 (A)	25 September 2011	
Fred (1)	Brazil	Fluminense	Coritiba	3–1 (H)	13 October 2011	
Neymar^{4} (2)	Brazil	Santos	Athletico Paranaense	4–1 (H)	29 October 2011	
Thiago Neves (1)	Brazil	Flamengo	Cruzeiro	5–1 (H)	6 November 2011	
Fred^{4} (2)	Brazil	Fluminense	Grêmio	5–4 (H)	16 November 2011	
Felipe Azevedo (1)	Brazil	Ceará	Grêmio	3–1 (A)	19 November 2011	
Fred (3)	Brazil	Fluminense	Figueirense	4–0 (A)	20 November 2011	
2012 season
Germán Herrera (1)	Argentina	Botafogo	São Paulo	4–2 (H)	20 May 2012	
Roger (1)	Brazil	Ponte Preta	Coritiba	4–1 (H)	14 July 2012	
Aloísio (1)	Brazil	Figueirense	Coritiba	3–1 (H)	26 August 2012	
Bruno Mineiro (1)	Brazil	Portuguesa	Sport Recife	5–1 (H)	4 October 2012	
Ronaldinho (2)	Brazil	Atlético Mineiro	Figueirense	6–0 (H)	6 October 2012	
Lucas Moura (1)	Brazil	São Paulo	Sport Recife	4–2 (A)	27 October 2012	
Neymar (3)	Brazil	Santos	Cruzeiro	4–0 (A)	3 November 2012	
2013 season
Luan (1)	Brazil	Cruzeiro	São Paulo	3–0 (A)	20 July 2013	
Jô (1)	Brazil	Atlético Mineiro	Coritiba	3–0 (H)	12 September 2013	
Gilberto (1)	Brazil	Portuguesa	Corinthians	4–0 (H)	29 September 2013	
Aloísio (2)	Brazil	São Paulo	Internacional	3–2 (A)	27 October 2013	
Diego Tardelli (1)	Brazil	Atlético Mineiro	Goiás	4–1 (H)	23 November 2013	
Éderson (1)	Brazil	Athletico Paranaense	Vasco da Gama	5–1 (H)	8 December 2013	
2014 season
Daniel Correa (1)	Brazil	Botafogo	Criciúma	6–0 (H)	10 May 2014	
Douglas Coutinho (1)	Brazil	Athletico Paranaense	Figueirense	3–1 (A)	1 June 2014	
Luciano (1)	Brazil	Corinthians	Goiás	5–2 (H)	21 August 2014	
Erik (1)	Brazil	Goiás	Athletico Paranaense	3–1 (H)	31 August 2014	
Patric (1)	Brazil	Sport Recife	Santos	3–1 (H)	10 September 2014	
Henrique Dourado (1)	Brazil	Palmeiras	Chapecoense	4-2 (H)	2 October 2014	
2015 season
Lucas Pratto (1)	Argentina	Atlético Mineiro	São Paulo	3–1 (H)	29 July 2015	
Willian^{4} (1)	Brazil	Cruzeiro	Figueirense	5–1 (H)	6 September 2015	
Lucas Barrios (1)	Paraguay	Palmeiras	Fluminense	4–1 (A)	16 September 2015	
2019 season
Bruno Rangel (1)	Brazil	Chapecoense	Coritiba	4–3 (A)	1 June 2016	
Sassá (1)	Brazil	Botafogo	América-MG	3–1 (H)	15 June 2016	
Rafael Sóbis (1)	Brazil	Cruzeiro	Internacional	4–2 (H)	4 August 2016	
2017 season
André (1)	Brazil	Sport Recife	Grêmio	4–3 (H)	28 May 2017	
Everton (1)	Brazil	Grêmio	Chapecoense	6–3 (A)	8 June 2017	
Paolo Guerrero (1)	Peru	Flamengo	Chapecoense	5–1 (H)	23 June 2017	
Jonathan Copete (1)	Colombia	Santos	São Paulo	3–2 (H)	9 July 2017	
Bruno Henrique (1)	Brazil	Santos	Bahia	3–0 (H)	23 July 2017	
2018 season
Rodrygo (1)	Brazil	Santos	Vitória	5–2 (H)	3 June 2018	
Ángel Romero (1)	Paraguay	Corinthians	Vasco da Gama	4–1 (A)	29 July 2018	
Gabriel Barbosa (1)	Brazil	Santos	Vasco da Gama	3–0 (A)	1 September 2018	
2019 season
Giorgian de Arrascaeta (1)	Uruguay	Flamengo	Goiás	6–1 (H)	14 July 2019	
Gilberto (2)	Brazil	Bahia	Flamengo	3–0 (H)	4 August 2019	
Thiago Galhardo (1)	Brazil	Ceará	Chapecoense	4–1 (H)	10 August 2019	
Luiz Adriano (1)	Brazil	Palmeiras	Fluminense	3–0 (H)	10 September 2019	
Bruno Henrique (2)	Brazil	Flamengo	Corinthians	4–1 (H)	3 November 2019	
Bruno Henrique (3)	Brazil	Flamengo	Ceará	4–1 (H)	27 November 2019	
2020 season
Bruno Henrique (4)	Brazil	Flamengo	São Paulo	5–1 (H)	9 November 2023	
2021 season
Ytalo (1)	Brazil	Red Bull Bragantino	Palmeiras	3–1 (H)	23 June 2021	
Gabriel Barbosa (2)	Brazil	Flamengo	Bahia	5–0 (A)	18 July 2021	
Bruno Henrique (5)	Brazil	Flamengo	São Paulo	5–1 (H)	25 July 2021	
Yuri Alberto (1)	Brazil	Internacional	Flamengo	4–0 (A)	8 August 2021	
Gabriel Barbosa (3)	Brazil	Flamengo	Santos	4–0 (A)	28 August 2021	
Hugo Rodallega^{4} (1)	Colombia	Bahia	Fortaleza	4–2 (H)	4 September 2021	
Yuri Alberto (2)	Brazil	Internacional	Chapecoense	5–2 (H)	10 October 2021	
2022 season
Jonathan Calleri (1)	Argentina	São Paulo	Athletico Paranaense	4–0 (H)	10 April 2022	
Róger Guedes (1)	Brazil	Corinthians	Avaí	3–0 (H)	16 April 2022	
Pedro (1)	Brazil	Flamengo	Red Bull Bragantino	4–1 (H)	1 October 2022	
Germán Cano (1)	Argentina	Fluminense	São Paulo	3–1 (H)	5 November 2022	
2023 season
Luis Suárez (1)	Uruguay	Grêmio	Botafogo	4–3 (A)	9 November 2023	
2024 season
Raphael Veiga (1)	Brazil	Palmeiras	Juventude	5–3 (A)	20 October 2024	
2025 season
Yuri Alberto (3)	Brazil	Corinthians	Internacional	4–2 (H)	3 May 2025	
Kaio Jorge (1)	Brazil	Cruzeiro	Grêmio	4–1 (H)	13 July 2025	
Pedro (2)	Brazil	Flamengo	Vitória	8–0 (H)	25 August 2025	
Vitor Roque (1)	Brazil	Palmeiras	Internacional	4–1 (H)	13 September 2025	
Carlos Vinícius (1)	Brazil	Grêmio	Juventude	3–1 (H)	26 October 2025	
Deyverson (1)	Brazil	Fortaleza	Atlético Mineiro	3–3 (A)	12 November 2025	
Neymar (4)	Brazil	Santos	Juventude	3–0 (A)	3 December 2025	
2026 season
Carlos Vinícius (2)	Brazil	Grêmio	Botafogo	5–3 (H)	4 February 2026	
Ferreira (1)	Brazil	São Paulo	Cruzeiro	4–1 (H)	4 April 2026	
Arthur Cabral (1)	Brazil	Botafogo	Corinthians	3–1 (H)	17 May 2026	
