= Pituca =

Pituca may refer to:

- Pituca (footballer, born 1978), Claussio dos Santos Dimas
- Diego Pituca, Brazilian footballer born 1992
