= Diego Lima =

Diego Lima may refer to:

- Diego Lima (footballer, born 1986), Brazilian football goalkeeper
- Diego Lima (footballer, born 1990), Brazilian football goalkeeper
- Diego Lima (footballer, born 1988), Brazilian football midfielder

== See also ==
- Dhiego Lima (born 1989), Brazilian mixed martial artist
