= Fábio Ferreira =

Fábio Ferreira may refer to:

- Fábio Ferreira (footballer, born 1984), Brazilian footballer
- Fábio Ferreira (footballer, born 1989), Portuguese footballer
