= Fake kidnapping =

Kidnapping that has been staged by the victim

A fake kidnapping or self-kidnapping is a kidnapping that has been staged by the victim.

== Notable incidents ==
- American Carlee Russell - on July 13, 2023, Carlee Russell faked an emergency call to 9-1-1 operators and her brother's girlfriend. Russell claimed during the call she saw a small child possibly 3 or 4 in a diaper walking on the side of the I-459 highway in Alabama, USA. Russell drove her car to the side of the highway where she claimed to see the child. During the call with her brother's girlfriend a scream was heard and the phone went dead. Russell's car was found three minutes later with her wig, her Apple watch, her phone, and her purse inside with the car door ajar. The U.S. Secret Service, the Federal Bureau of Investigation, and a large portion of law enforcement agents across the country searched for Russell for two days until her return. On July 24, 2023 through her attorney Carlee Russell released a statement confirming the entire kidnapping was a hoax. It is suspected Russell faked the kidnapping to gain the attention of a recent ex-boyfriend.
- Yuriana Julia Pelaez Calderón falsely claimed to have been abducted by immigration authorities in 2025. She pled guilty in 2026. Los Angeles mayor Karen Bass helped spread the hoax.
- Brazilian soccer player Somália - on January 7, 2011, Somália claimed he had been kidnapped at gunpoint before being robbed. CCTV footage later proved that he was simply late for training, and fabricated the story in order to circumvent the club's 40% wage drop in case of tardiness. Somália was charged with filing a false police report and on January 19, 2011, agreed to a deal offered by prosecutors to donate R$22,000 (approximately U.S.$13,000) to the victims of the then-recent floods in Rio de Janeiro, in order to avoid a possible prison sentence and criminal record.
- Dar Heatherington (born 1963) - a politician who claimed to have been abducted in Montana in 2003.
- Joanna Grenside - an aerobics teacher from Harpenden, England; staged her disappearance a few days before Christmas 1992. She suffered from the eating disorder bulimia and sought to avoid the overindulgence of food that went on at Christmas parties.
- Fairlie Arrow - a singer; claimed abduction in Queensland in 1991. Joanna Grenside was working in Queensland at the time, leading to the possibility that it inspired her own event later.
- Karol Sanchez - a 16-year-old girl; had two young adult men that were friends of hers stage her abduction on December 16, 2019 around midnight in the Bronx, when she and her mother were walking down a street. There, the two men "kidnapped" Sanchez in front of her horrified mother, who was under the impression that her daughter's "abduction" was real. Karol's mother attempted to fight the two men in attempt to rescue her, but was shoved aside by the men before driving off with Karol in their possession. Karol was found safe and unharmed the next day where she confessed that she was never in actual danger due to her abduction being staged. Sanchez's motivations stemmed from her mother's intentions to move their family to Honduras, as the teenager had no wish to leave her old life behind.
