= Marcelo Carné =

Brazilian footballer (born 1990)

Personal information
- Full name: Marcelo Henrique Passos Carné
- Date of birth: 6 February 1990 (age 36)
- Place of birth: Rio de Janeiro, Brazil
- Height: 1.89 m (6 ft 2 1/2 in)
- Position: Goalkeeper

Team information
- Current team: Cuiabá
- Number: 31

Youth career
- 2004–2010: Flamengo

Senior career*
| Years | Team | Apps | (Gls) |
| 2010–2012 | Flamengo | 0 | (0) |
| 2011 | → Boavista (loan) | 0 | (0) |
| 2011 | → Duque de Caxias (loan) | 16 | (0) |
| 2013 | Tombense | 3 | (0) |
| 2013–2015 | Boavista | 14 | (0) |
| 2014 | → Nova Iguaçu (loan) | 0 | (0) |
| 2016 | Brasília | 0 | (0) |
| 2017 | América de Teófilo Otoni | 10 | (0) |
| 2017 | Audax Rio | 22 | (0) |
| 2018 | Bonsucesso | 18 | (0) |
| 2019–2021 | Juventude | 108 | (0) |
| 2022 | CSA | 44 | (0) |
| 2023 | Marítimo | 14 | (0) |
| 2023–2024 | Estoril | 22 | (0) |
| 2024–2025 | Al-Jabalain | 24 | (0) |
| 2026 | Velo Clube | 8 | (0) |
| 2026– | Cuiabá | 22 | (0) |

International career^{‡}
| 2007 | Brazil U17 | 10 | (0) |
- * Club domestic league appearances and goals as of 18 November 2026 ‡ National team caps and goals as of 26 August 2023

Marcelo Henrique Passos Carné (born 6 February 1990), is a Brazilian footballer who plays as a goalkeeper for Cuiabá.

== Club career ==
=== Flamengo ===
Carné began his career in the youth team of Bangu, but joined Flamengo's youth setup in 2004, aged 14. He was promoted to the main squad in 2010, but subsequently served loans at Boavista and Duque de Caxias.

=== Al-Jabalain ===
On 18 July 2024, Carné joined Saudi First Division League side Al-Jabalain.

== Career statistics ==
As of 29 November 2021.

| Club | Season | League | | | State League | | Cup | | Continental | | Other | | Total | |
| Club | Season | Division | Apps | Goals | Apps | Goals | Apps | Goals | Apps | Goals | Apps | Goals | Apps | Goals |
|---|---|---|---|---|---|---|---|---|---|---|---|---|---|---|
| Flamengo | 2010 | Série A | 0 | 0 | 0 | 0 | 0 | 0 | — | | — | | 0 | 0 |
| Flamengo | 2012 | Série A | 0 | 0 | 0 | 0 | 0 | 0 | — | | — | | 0 | 0 |
| Flamengo | Total | | 0 | 0 | 0 | 0 | 0 | 0 | — | | — | | 0 | 0 |
| Boavista (loan) | 2011 | Carioca | — | | 0 | 0 | — | | — | | — | | 0 | 0 |
| Duque de Caxias (loan) | 2011 | Série B | 16 | 0 | — | | — | | — | | — | | 16 | 0 |
| Tombense | 2013 | Mineiro | — | | 3 (Note: Appearance(s) in Campeonato Mineiro.) | 0 | — | | — | | — | | 3 | 0 |
| Boavista | 2013 | Carioca | — | | 0 | 0 | — | | — | | 2 (Note: Appearance(s) in Copa Rio.) | 0 | 2 | 0 |
| Boavista | 2014 | Carioca | — | | 0 | 0 | 1 | 0 | — | | — | | 1 | 0 |
| Boavista | 2015 | Carioca | — | | 13 (Note: Appearance(s) in Campeonato Carioca.) | 0 | 2 | 0 | — | | — | | 15 | 0 |
| Boavista | Total | | — | | 15 | 0 | 3 | 0 | — | | — | | 18 | 0 |
| Nova Iguaçu (loan) | 2014 | Carioca | — | | — | | — | | — | | 0 | 0 | 0 | 0 |
| Brasília | 2016 | Brasiliense | — | | 0 | 0 | — | | — | | 0 | 0 | 0 | 0 |
| América de Teófilo Otoni | 2017 | Mineiro | — | | 10 | 0 | — | | — | | — | | 10 | 0 |
| Audax Rio | 2017 | Carioca B1 | — | | 22 (Note: Appearance(s) in Campeonato Carioca Série B1.) | 0 | — | | — | | 4 | 0 | 26 | 0 |
| Bonsucesso | 2018 | Carioca B1 | — | | 18 | 0 | — | | — | | — | | 18 | 0 |
| Juventude | 2019 | Série C | 20 | 0 | 11 (Note: Appearance(s) in Campeonato Gaúcho.) | 0 | 8 | 0 | — | | — | | 39 | 0 |
| Juventude | 2020 | Série B | 32 | 0 | 10 | 0 | 7 | 0 | — | | — | | 49 | 0 |
| Juventude | 2021 | Série A | 21 | 0 | 13 | 0 | 2 | 0 | — | | — | | 36 | 0 |
| Juventude | Total | | 73 | 0 | 34 | 0 | 17 | 0 | — | | — | | 124 | 0 |
| Career total | | | 89 | 0 | 100 | 0 | 20 | 0 | 0 | 0 | 6 | 0 | 215 | 0 |

== Honours ==
=== International ===
Brazil

- South American Under-15 Football Championship: 2005
- South American Under-17 Football Championship: 2007
