= Anderson (footballer, born 1982) =

Brazilian footballer

Personal information
- Full name: Anderson Grasiane de Mattos Silva
- Date of birth: August 26, 1982 (age 44)
- Place of birth: Itaperuna, Brazil
- Height: 1.81 m (5 ft 11 1/2 in)
- Position: Centre back

Team information
- Current team: Olaria

Senior career*
| Years | Team | Apps | (Gls) |
| 2001–2002 | Mogi Mirim | | |
| 2002–2005 | Corinthians Paranaense | | |
| 2003 | → FC Maia (loan) | | |
| 2006 | Americano | | |
| 2007 | Volta Redonda | | |
| 2008 | Gama | | |
| 2008–2009 | Americano | | |
| 2009–2011 | Ceará | 44 | (1) |
| 2011 | → Atlético Goianiense (loan) | 34 | (1) |
| 2012–2013 | Fluminense | 27 | (1) |
| 2014–2015 | Ceará | 9 | (0) |
| 2015 | Nova Iguaçu | 10 | (0) |
| 2016 | Vila Nova | 28 | (2) |
| 2016–2017 | Botafogo-PB | 0 | (0) |
| 2017 | Tombense | 16 | (1) |
| 2017 | Botafogo-PB | 0 | (0) |
| 2018 | Tombense | 22 | (1) |
| 2020– | Olaria | 30 | (1) |
- * Club domestic league appearances and goals as of 3 September 2016

Anderson Grasiane de Mattos Silva, better known as Anderson (born August 26, 1982, Itaperuna, Brazil), is a Brazilian footballer who acts as a defender for Olaria.

== Career ==
Played by Ceará since 2009.

== Honours ==
Fluminense

- Campeonato Carioca: 2012
- Campeonato Brasileiro Série A: 2012

== Contract ==
- Ceará.
