= Thiago Sales =

Brazilian footballer

Personal information
- Full name: Thiago Guimarães Sales
- Date of birth: May 7, 1987 (age 39)
- Place of birth: Rio de Janeiro, Brazil
- Height: 1.90 m (6 ft 3 in)
- Position: Centre-back

Team information
- Current team: Resende

Youth career
- 2005–2006: Flamengo

Senior career*
Years	Team	Apps	(Gls)
2007–2010	Flamengo	6	(1)
2009–2010	→ Apollon Limassol (loan)	15	(1)
2010–2011	Fluminense	0	(0)
2011	Avaí	1	(0)
2012	Boavista		
2012	→ Apollon Limassol (loan)	7	(1)
2013–2016	Resende	58	(2)
2014–2015	→ Al-Jahra (loan)		
2016	Tupi	1	(0)
2016–2018	Resende		
2018–	Caxias		
- * Club domestic league appearances and goals

Thiago Guimarães Sales (born May 7, 1987), or simply Thiago Sales, is a Brazilian footballer who plays as a centre-back for Caxias.

== Career ==
He made his professional debut and scored for Flamengo against Sport in a 1-1 draw in the Campeonato Brasileiro, on September 1, 2007.

== Career statistics ==
(Correct As of December 5, 2011)

Club	Season	Carioca League			Brazilian Série A			Copa do Brasil			Copa Libertadores			Copa Sudamericana			Total		
Club	Season	Apps	Goals	Assists	Apps	Goals	Assists	Apps	Goals	Assists	Apps	Goals	Assists	Apps	Goals	Assists	Apps	Goals	Assists
Flamengo	2007	-	-	-	5	1	0	-	-	-	-	-	-	-	-	-	5	1	0
Flamengo	2008	6	4	0	1	0	0	-	-	-	0	0	0	-	-	-	7	4	0
Flamengo	2009	2	0	0	-	-	-	1	0	0	-	-	-	-	-	-	3	0	0
Club total		8	4	0	6	1	0	1	0	0	-	-	-	-	-	-	15	5	0
Fluminense	2010	-	-	-	0	0	0	-	-	-	-	-	-	-	-	-	0	0	0
Fluminense	2011	0	0	0	0	0	0	-	-	-	-	-	-	-	-	-	0	0	0
Club total		0	0	0	0	0	0	0	0	0	0	0	0	0	0	0	0	0	0
Avaí	2011	-	-	-	1	0	0	-	-	-	-	-	-	-	-	-	1	0	0
Club total		0	0	0	1	0	0	0	0	0	0	0	0	0	0	0	1	0	0
Career total		8	4	0	7	1	0	1	0	0	-	-	-	-	-	-	16	5	0

according to combined sources on the Flamengo official website and Flaestatística.

== Honours ==
- Flamengo
  - Taça Guanabara: 2008
  - Campeonato Brasileiro Série A: 2009
  - Taça Rio: 2009
  - Rio de Janeiro State League: 2008, 2009
- Fluminense
  - Campeonato Brasileiro Série A: 2010
- Apollon Limassol
  - Cypriot Cup: 2009–2010
- Resende
  - Copa Rio: 2015
