= Lenon (footballer, born 1990) =

Brazilian footballer

Personal information
- Full name: Lenon Fernandes Ribeiro
- Date of birth: May 2, 1990 (age 36)
- Place of birth: São Paulo, SP, Brazil
- Height: 1.77 m (5 ft 10 in)
- Positions: Defensive midfielder; right-back

Team information
- Current team: Botafogo-PB

Youth career
- Madureira
- 2007–2009: Flamengo

Senior career*
Years	Team	Apps	(Gls)
2009–2013	Flamengo	17	(0)
2010	→ Goiás (loan)	2	(0)
2011	→ Duque de Caxias (loan)	13	(1)
2011–2012	→ Náutico (loan)	38	(3)
2012	→ Sport (loan)	0	(0)
2013	→ Macaé (loan)	13	(1)
2013	→ Duque de Caxias (loan)	25	(1)
2014	Duque de Caxias	15	(0)
2015	Cabofriense	17	(0)
2015–2019	Guarani	163	(4)
2018	→ Vasco da Gama (loan)	9	(0)
2020–	Cuiabá	5	(0)
- * Club domestic league appearances and goals

Lenon Fernandes Ribeiro, or simply Lenon (born May 2, 1990), is a Brazilian footballer who also plays as a defensive midfielder or right-back for Botafogo-PB.

== Career ==
Lenon was born in São Paulo. He was promoted to Flamengo's professional squad in 2009 during the Rio de Janeiro State League and debuted in a Fla-Flu derby on April 5. With coach Andrade he received more chances to play with 10 appearances in 2009 Brazilian Série A and one in the Copa do Brasil.

== Career statistics ==
(Correct as of December 5, 2011)

Club	Season	State League		League		Copa do Brasil		Copa Libertadores		Copa Sudamericana		Total	
Club	Season	Apps	Goals	Apps	Goals	Apps	Goals	Apps	Goals	Apps	Goals	Apps	Goals
Flamengo	2009	1	0	10	0	1	0	-	-	0	0	12	0
Flamengo	2010	4	0	0	0	-	-	0	0	-	-	4	0
Goiás (loan)	2010	-	-	2	0	-	-	-	-	0	0	2	0
Duque de Caxias (loan)	2011	13	1	-	-	-	-	-	-	-	-	13	1
Náutico (loan)	2011	-	-	14	1	-	-	-	-	-	-	14	1
Total		18	1	26	1	1	0	0	0	0	0	45	1

according to combined sources on the Flamengo official website and Flaestatística.

== Honours ==
- Flamengo youth
  - Rio State League: 2006
  - Torneio Internacional Circuito das Águas: 2007
  - Copa Macaé de Juvenis: 2007
- Flamengo
  - Taça Rio: 2009
  - Rio State League: 2009
  - Brazilian Série A: 2009
