= Giovanny Romero =

Venezuelan footballer (born 1984)

Personal information
- Full name: Giovanny Michael Romero Armenio
- Date of birth: 1 January 1984 (age 42)
- Place of birth: Caracas, Venezuela
- Height: 1.84 m (6 ft 0 in)
- Position: Defender

Team information
- Current team: ACD Stintino

Youth career
- Caracas

Senior career*
Years	Team	Apps	(Gls)
2003–2010	Caracas		
2004	→ Trujillanos (loan)		
2005	→ CD Italmaracaibo (loan)		
2010	Al-Qadsiah		
2011–2013	Mineros de Guayana	53	(1)
2013–2014	Atlético Venezuela	31	(0)
2014	Doxa Katokopias	0	(0)
2014–2016	Zulia	73	(4)
2017	Deportivo Táchira	32	(1)
2018	Deportivo La Guaira	13	(1)
2018	Academia Puerto Cabello	16	(1)
2019	Paternò	10	(2)
2019	Las Zocas		
2020–	ACD Stintino	5	(0)

International career^{‡}
2010–2011	Venezuela	5	(0)
- * Club domestic league appearances and goals as of 16:52, 9 May 2020 (UTC) ‡ National team caps and goals as of 14:39, 3 May 2019 (UTC)

Giovanny Michael Romero Armenio (born 1 January 1984) is a Venezuelan international footballer who plays for Italian club ACD Stintino, as a defender.

Born in Caracas, Romero has played club football for Caracas, Mineros de Guayana, Atlético Venezuela, Doxa Katokopias, Zulia, Deportivo Táchira, Deportivo La Guaira, Academia Puerto Cabello and Paternò.

== Club career ==
Romero is a product of Caracas, where he began his career in the 2001 season at the age of 17. The following year he had unsuccessful trials at Italian clubs Napoli and at Palmese. He then went on a trial at Deportivo Pereira in Colombia; after his return to Caracas he was on loaned out to Trujillanos and later to Deportivo Italmaracaibo. In the summer of 2010 he moved to Saudi Arabian club Al-Qadsiah FC.

In January 2019, Romero moved to Italian Eccellenza club A.S.D. Paternò 1908. He left the club in the summer 2019 and joined Spanish club UD Las Zocas. He then returned back to Italy in January 2020, signing with Promozione club ACD Stintino.

== International career ==
He made his international debut for Venezuela in 2010.
