= Gabriel Valongo =

Brazilian footballer (born 1987)

Personal information
- Full name: Gabriel Valongo da Silva
- Date of birth: June 30, 1987 (age 39)
- Place of birth: Camaçari, Brazil
- Height: 1.93 m (6 ft 4 in)
- Position: Center back

Team information
- Current team: Luverdense

Youth career
- Bahia
- –2006: Grêmio
- 2006–2007: Esporte Clube Vitória

Senior career*
Years	Team	Apps	(Gls)
2007–2010	Vitória	0	(0)
2007	→ Democrata (loan)	0	(0)
2008	→ 15 de Novembro (loan)	0	(0)
2009	→ Bragantino (loan)	0	(0)
2009	→ Paraná (loan)	17	(4)
2010–2011	Desportivo Brasil		
2010	→ Avaí (loan)	16	(1)
2011	→ Atlético Paranaense (loan)	13	(1)
2011	→ Guarani (loan)	14	(1)
2012–2015	São Caetano	64	(5)
2015	→ Campinense (loan)	4	(0)
2015–2016	Bahia	6	(0)
2016	Assyriska	1	(0)
2016–	Luverdense	11	(0)
- * Club domestic league appearances and goals as of 20 November 2016 (UTC)

Gabriel Valongo da Silva better known as Gabriel (Camaçari, June 30, 1987) is a Brazilian footballer who plays as a center back for Luverdense.

== Career statistics ==
(Correct as of October 16, 2010)

Club	Season	State League		Brazilian Série A		Copa do Brasil		Copa Sudamericana		Total	
Club	Season	Apps	Goals	Apps	Goals	Apps	Goals	Apps	Goals	Apps	Goals
Avaí	2010	-	-	16	1	-	-	-	-	16	1
Total		-	-			-	-	-	-		

== Honours ==
Avaí

- Campeonato Catarinense: 2010

== Contract ==
- a three-year contract with Atlético Paranaense.
- a one-year loan deal with Guarani. (June 2011 to May 2012)
