= Michael (footballer, born 1983) =

Brazilian footballer

Personal information
- Full name: Michael Anderson Pereira da Silva
- Date of birth: February 16, 1983 (age 43)
- Place of birth: São Caetano do Sul, Brazil
- Height: 1.73 m (5 ft 8 in)
- Position: Left midfielder

Youth career
- 2002–2003: Santo André

Senior career*
Years	Team	Apps	(Gls)
2004	Cruzeiro	0	(0)
2004–2007	Palmeiras	40	(2)
2007–2011	Dynamo Kyiv	11	(3)
2008	→ Santos (loan)	20	(1)
2009	→ Botafogo (loan)	6	(0)
2010	→ Flamengo (loan)	8	(0)
2012–2013	→ Portuguesa (loan)	5	(0)
2014	Rio Preto	0	(0)
2014–2015	Santo André	?	(?)
2015	Volta Redonda	?	(?)
- * Club domestic league appearances and goals

Michael Anderson Pereira da Silva (born February 16, 1983) better known as simply Michael, is a Brazilian former professional footballer who played as a left midfielder.

== Career ==
Michael started his professional career in Santo André, and soon moved to Cruzeiro, however after 1 season he moved to São Paulo playing for Palmeiras. After two seasons with Palmeiras in July 2007, Michael signed a three-year deal with Ukrainian club Dynamo Kyiv.

Michael debuted for Dynamo on 22 July against Arsenal Kyiv and managed to score a double in his debut.UPL Round 2 Silva made his UEFA Champions League debut in a group stage game against Italian team Roma. Most of the autumn and winter 2007 Michael was injured and was undergoing treatment in Brazil, however he has recovered and returned since. On 13 May 2009, he moved on loan from Dynamo Kyiv to Botafogo until 31 December 2009.

Michael moved from Kyiv to Portuguesa on 23 May 2011.

== Career statistics ==
(Correct as of December 23, 2010)

Club	Season	Brazilian Série A		Brazilian Cup		Copa Libertadores		Copa Sudamericana		Carioca League		Total	
Club	Season	Apps	Goals	Apps	Goals	Apps	Goals	Apps	Goals	Apps	Goals	Apps	Goals
Flamengo	2010	8	0	-	-	5	2	-	-	4	0	17	2
Total		8	0	0	0	5	2	0	0	4	0	17	2

according to combined sources on the Flamengo official website and Flaestatística.
