= Thiago Martinelli =

Brazilian footballer

Personal information
- Full name: Thiago Martinelli da Silva
- Date of birth: January 14, 1980 (age 46)
- Place of birth: Jundiaí, Brazil
- Height: 1.81 m (5 ft 11 in)
- Position: Central defender

Team information
- Current team: Audax-SP

Youth career
- 1999–2000: Paulista

Senior career*
Years	Team	Apps	(Gls)
2000–2003	Paulista		
2003–2007	São Caetano	83	(4)
2007–2008	Cruzeiro	1	(0)
2009	Cerezo Osaka	41	(2)
2010	Vasco da Gama	4	(0)
2010	Vitória	11	(0)
2011	São Caetano	20	(1)
2012–	Audax-SP		
- * Club domestic league appearances and goals as of 10 January 2012

Thiago Martinelli da Silva (born January 14, 1980, in Jundiaí), is a Brazilian central defender. He last played for Audax-SP.

== Honours ==
- Brazilian League (3rd division): 2001
- São Paulo State League: 2004
