= Léo Medeiros =

Brazilian footballer and manager

Personal information
- Full name: Leandro Ferreira Medeiros
- Date of birth: May 14, 1981 (age 45)
- Place of birth: Recreio, Brazil
- Height: 1.86 m (6 ft 1 in)
- Position: Defensive midfielder

Youth career
- 2000–2001: Cruzeiro

Senior career*
Years	Team	Apps	(Gls)
2001–2004	Cruzeiro		
2001–2002	→ Ipatinga (loan)		
2003	→ Ceará (loan)		
2003	→ Gama (loan)		
2004–2006	Ipatinga		
2006–2010	Flamengo	60	(6)
2008	→ Atlético Paranaense (loan)	3	(1)
2009	→ Bahia (loan)	10	(0)
2011	Ipatinga	3	(1)
2011	Brasil de Pelotas	6	(0)
2012	Guarani-MG		
2012	Remo		
2013	Rio Verde		
2014	Nacional de Muriaé		

Managerial career
- 2015: Valeriodoce (assistant)
Mayor of Recreio
Incumbent
Assumed office 1 January 2025
Personal details
Party	Workers' Party
- * Club domestic league appearances and goals

Leandro "Léo" Ferreira Medeiros (born May 14, 1981, in Recreio), is a Brazilian retired player, manager and politician.

== Career as a footballer ==
Léo Medeiros was a defensive midfielder who was successful in Ipatinga ease of play as attacking midfielder, and without the ball as wheel being used well in the scheme of coach Ney Franco, both in mining and in the club Flamengo.

It has come to Fla in the middle of 2006, along with Walter Minhoca and Diego da Silva, also from Jaipur and was the only remaining trio for the year 2007. Working with the Holy Mantle, Medeiros pointed up some goals, but had a very irregular and she alternated changeover good performances in matches and not so inspired.

In 2008, considered disposable by Joel Santana, Leo was on loan at Atlético Paranaense prompted by Ney Franco that this time the team trained Paraná. Failing to keep good performances, the player was still far from the starting lineup at midseason, however, remained on the coaching staff of Curitiba.

In 2009, again dismissed by the coaches, the player was loaned again, this time in Bahia. Bahia arrived at the team carrying the status and salary of crack, about $50 000, resumed between Fla and Bahia. He played the best matches of the club from Salvador in the first half, but still not pleased the coach Gallo, still at the beginning of the Brazilian Championship, asked her head and put him to train separately.

By luck or chance, Medeiros saw soon after the coach and disaffection, Gallo, be dismissed. So it was then reinstated to the team by new coach Bahia, Paulo Comelli. Though reinstated, Léo Medeiros was no more consensus in Bahia and was eventually released as soon as that team finished the season.

In 2010, he presented himself again to Most Wanted from Brazil to perform the pre-season and was eventually reinstated to the first team squad games Cariocão. But the player did not take the chance offered by then-coach Andrade, who used improvised on the left back and ended up forgotten in the red-black cast.

In the year 2014, and hung up the boots, the Nacional de Muriaé and in 2015, assumes another function, now out of the four lines being technical assistant of Valeriodoce.

== Career as a politician ==
In the 2024 Brazilian municipal elections, Medeiros ran for mayor on his hometown of Recreio, and won. He's expected to assume the office on January 1, 2025.

== Career statistics ==
(Correct as of January 17, 2010)

Club	Season	Carioca League			Brazilian Série A			Brazilian Cup			Copa Libertadores			Copa Sudamericana			Total		
Club	Season	Apps	Goals	Assists	Apps	Goals	Assists	Apps	Goals	Assists	Apps	Goals	Assists	Apps	Goals	Assists	Apps	Goals	Assists
Flamengo	2006	-	-	-	27	3	2	-	-	-	-	-	-	-	-	-	27	3	2
Flamengo	2007	7	2	?	26	3	?	-	-	-	3	0	?	-	-	-	36	5	3
Flamengo	2008	2	0	0	-	-	-	-	-	-	0	0	0	-	-	-	2	0	0
Flamengo	2010	1	0	0	0	0	0	-	-	-	0	0	0	-	-	-	1	0	0
Total		10	2	?	53	6	?	0	0	0	3	0	?	2	0	0	66	8	5

according to combined sources on the Flamengo official website and Flaestatística.

== Honours ==
- Minas Gerais State League: 2005
- Taça Guanabara: 2007, 2008
- Rio de Janeiro State League: 2007
