= Fabiano Oliveira =

Brazilian footballer (born 1987)

Personal information
- Full name: Fabiano Monteiro de Oliveira
- Date of birth: March 6, 1987 (age 39)
- Place of birth: Seropédica, Brazil
- Height: 1.82 m (6 ft 0 in)
- Position: Striker

Youth career
- 2004–2007: Flamengo

Senior career*
| Years | Team | Apps | (Gls) |
| 2004–2013 | Flamengo | 31 | (5) |
| 2007 | → Goiás (loan) | 12 | (1) |
| 2008 | → Fortaleza (loan) | 0 | (0) |
| 2008 | → CD Nacional (loan) | 20 | (1) |
| 2009–2010 | → Giresunspor (loan) | 21 | (10) |
| 2010–2011 | → Boluspor (loan) | 27 | (6) |
| 2012–2013 | → Boavista (loan) | 0 | (0) |
| 2013–2014 | Adanaspor | 1 | (0) |
| 2014–2016 | Tigres do Brasil | 21 | (6) |
| 2016 | União da Madeira | 0 | (0) |
| 2017 | Portuguesa | 0 | (0) |
| 2017 | Birkirkara | 5 | (2) |

International career
| 2007 | Brazil U-20 | | |
- * Club domestic league appearances and goals

Fabiano Monteiro de Oliveira, also known as Fabiano Oliveira (born March 6, 1987), is a Brazilian striker who most recently played for Birkirkara.

== Career ==
=== Flamengo Youth Team ===
Beginning with his time in the Juniores squad, Fabiano Oliveira quickly rose beyond the status of a promising talent at Estádio da Gávea, ultimately earning the title of “Carioca of the Year 2005.” He had already been appearing for the senior team since 2004, contributing solid performances for the club. Still eligible for the Juniores side, he strengthened the squad coached by Adílio and helped lead them to victory in the 2005 Campeonato Carioca de Juniores.

=== Flamengo ===
By end of state competition, Oliveira was integrated to professional staff, and appeared in 26 matches in 2005, scoring four goals. The first, in a match against Tupi under the command of technical Celso Roth.

=== Brazil U-18 and Renewal ===
Later that year, Oliveira was to be convened by coach Renê Weber for the Brazil U-18, who contest the XXIII International Tournament of the Milk Cup and finally signed a contract with Flamengo until 2011, with an estimated salary of R$6 million.

=== Champion of Copa do Brasil and loan to Goiás ===
Despite being used sporadically in Flamengo, Fabiano remained in the team and resisted commands of Waldemar Lemos, Valdir Espinosa and Ney Franco. He formed the scratch champion of Copa do Brasil in 2006 and played 22 games that season, scoring four goals. However, in 2007, with the cast swelling, Flamengo, despite followed compliments, coach Ney Franco decided to lend it to Goiás.

Disputed in the 2007 season by Goiás, where he was partly fundamental and he was almost demoted to second division of Campeonato Brasileiro.

=== Fortaleza and CD Nacional ===
In 2008, he returned to Flamengo and has not been regarded by the future-coach Joel Santana. Little reminded, the club had its name speculated on Fortaleza but eventually even being negotiated by a loan to European football, more precisely to the CD Nacional of Portugal.

=== Giresunspor ===
In 2009, the signed loan agreement with the Turkish Giresunspor and scored in the first season 13 goals in 36 games for the club, 12 in Second Division National Championship and by a Turkish Cup.

=== Return and loan to Boluspor ===
Despite the good retrospect in Giresunspor, Fabiano, who in 2010 renewed its contract with the Flamengo for more two years, has not borrowed to that club again, but to his rival Boluspor, also in Turkey.

== Honours ==
- Flamengo
  - Copa do Brasil: 2006
