= Cleidson =

Brazilian footballer (born 1988)

Personal information
- Full name: Cleidson Rodrigues dos Santos
- Date of birth: 13 August 1988 (age 38)
- Place of birth: Campina Grande, Brazil
- Height: 1.83 m (6 ft 0 in)
- Position: Left-back

Team information
- Current team: Itumbiara
- Number: 35

Youth career
- 2005–2007: Treze
- 2007–2008: Sport
- 2008–2009: Treze

Senior career*
Years	Team	Apps	(Gls)
2009–2010	Treze	4	(1)
2010	Grêmio Prudente	8	(0)
2011	Mogi Mirim	0	(0)
2011–	Itumbiara	71	(2)

International career
2008	Brazil U20	1	(0)
- * Club domestic league appearances and goals

Cleidson Rodrigues dos Santos or simply Cleidson (born 13 August 1988) is a Brazilian footballer who plays primarily as a left-back. He currently plays for Itumbiara Esporte Clube.

Cleidson was linked with several European clubs during the 2012 summer transfer window: most notably VfB Stuttgart of the German Bundesliga as well as Queens Park Rangers and Swansea City, then both of the English Premier League.

Cleidson earned one cap for the Brazil U20 national football team in 2008 whilst a youth player at Treze.

== Career statistics ==
As of 11 March 2013

Club	Season	League		Copa do Brasil		Copa Libertadores		Other		Total	
Club	Season	Apps	Goals	Apps	Goals	Apps	Goals	Apps	Goals	Apps	Goals
Treze	2009–10	4	1	2	0	––		1	1	7	2
Grêmio Prudente	2009–10	8	0	––		––		2	0	10	0
Mogi Mirim	2010–11	0	0	1	0	3	0	––		4	0
Itumbiara	2010–11	30	2	2	0	––		1	0	33	2
Itumbiara	2011–12	19	0	1	0	––		1	0	21	0
Itumbiara	2012–13	22	0	3	0	––		––		25	0
Career total		83	3	9	0	3	0	5	1	100	4
