= Antônio (footballer, born 1989) =

Brazilian footballer

Personal information
- Full name: Antônio Carlos Rodrigues dos Santos Júnior
- Date of birth: March 30, 1989 (age 37)
- Place of birth: Rio de Janeiro, Brazil
- Height: 1.82 m (6 ft 0 in)
- Position: Defensive midfielder

Team information
- Current team: Flamengo

Youth career
- Fluminense
- 2006–2009: Flamengo

Senior career*
Years	Team	Apps	(Gls)
2009–	Flamengo	1	(0)
2010	→ Americano (loan)	0	(0)
2010	→ CFZ (loan)	0	(0)
2011	→ Duque de Caxias (loan)	8	(0)

International career
2008	Brazil U20		
- * Club domestic league appearances and goals as of December 5, 2011

Antônio Carlos Rodrigues dos Santos Júnior, better known as Antônio (born March 30, 1989), is a Brazilian professional footballer who plays as a defensive midfielder for Flamengo.

== Career ==
=== Fluminense ===
Carioca began his career in Futsal. His first steps were on the court of Vila Isabel. There, caught the attention of other clubs, and ended up at Fluminense.

=== Flamengo ===
Thanks to its prominence in soccer, the head-of-area was invited to transfer to Flamengo and make the transition to the football field. Since then she has been doing its part and collecting evidence. In two years, the first one as the second year of youth and the second as the first year of junior, won five trophies, including two Campeonato Carioca, one in each category.

=== Brazil U-20 ===
In the 2008 season, Antônio has continued in the juniores team in his second and final year in the category, with good participation on the team. In between, he was captain of the Brazil U-20 then headed by Rogério Lourenço and was not the World category because they are severely injured.

=== Americano, CFZ do Rio and Return to Flamengo ===
In early 2010 was promoted to professional, but without many opportunities came to be loaned to Americano who will not be seized and returned Gávea, where Antônio headed to the club partner, the CFZ do Rio in order to recover from injury suffered years before. Later, with the arrival of Zico as executive in charge of football and under the tutelage of Rogério Lourenço, the shuttle returned to Flamengo in order to be integrated into the senior team to compete in the 2010 Brazilian Championship.

== Career statistics ==
(Correct as of December 5, 2011)

Appearances and goals by club, season and competition
Club	Season	State League		League		Copa do Brasil		Copa Libertadores		Copa Sudamericana		Total	
Club	Season	Apps	Goals	Apps	Goals	Apps	Goals	Apps	Goals	Apps	Goals	Apps	Goals
Flamengo	2009	0	0	—		—		—		—		0	0
Americano (loan)	2010	0	0	—		—		—		—		0	0
CFZ (loan)	2010	0	0	—		—		—		—		0	0
Flamengo	2010	0	0	1	0	—		—		—		1	0
Duque de Caxias (loan)	2011	11	0	8	0	—		—		—		19	0
Total		11	0	9	0	-	-	-	-	-	-	20	0

according to combined sources on the Flamengo official website and Flaestatística.
