= Leandro Guerreiro =

Brazilian footballer

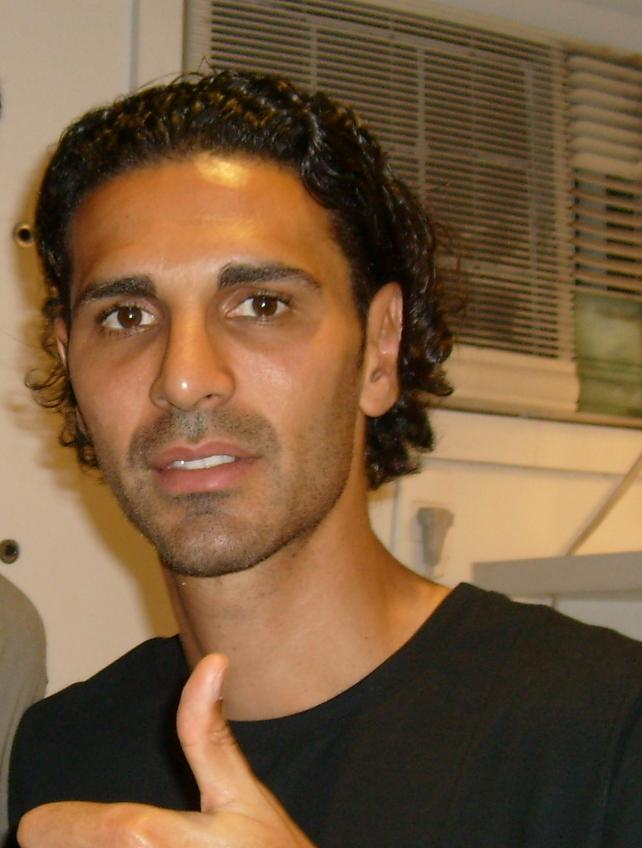

Personal information
- Full name: Leandro Luchese Guerreiro
- Date of birth: 17 November 1978 (age 47)
- Place of birth: São Borja, Brazil
- Height: 1.82 m (6 ft 0 in)
- Position: Defensive midfielder

Youth career
- 1997–1998: São Luiz

Senior career*
Years	Team	Apps	(Gls)
1999–2001	Internacional	50	(0)
2002–2003	Guarani	46	(1)
2003–2004	Salernitana	14	(0)
2004–2005	Napoli	3	(0)
2005	Ponte Preta		
2005–2006	→ Pescara (loan)	12	(0)
2006	Criciúma	29	(1)
2007–2010	Botafogo	96	(4)
2011–2013	Cruzeiro	63	(4)
2014–2016	América Mineiro	138	(1)
- * Club domestic league appearances and goals

Leandro Luchese Guerreiro (born 17 November 1978) is a Brazilian former footballer who played as a defensive midfielder.

== Honours ==
Criciúma

- Campeonato Brasileiro Série C: 2006

Botafogo

- Taça Rio: 2007, 2008, 2010
- Taça Guanabara: 2009, 2010
- Campeonato Carioca: 2010

Cruzeiro

- Campeonato Mineiro: 2011
- Campeonato Brasileiro Série A: 2013
