= Caio (footballer, born 1980) =

Brazilian footballer

Personal information
- Full name: Antonio Caio da Silva Souza
- Date of birth: November 10, 1980 (age 45)
- Place of birth: Nova Odessa, Brazil
- Height: 1.68 m (5 ft 6 in)
- Position: Attacking midfielder

Team information
- Current team: Goiás

Senior career*
Years	Team	Apps	(Gls)
	Rio Branco	?	(?)
	Rio Preto	?	(?)
1999–2003	Ituano	?	(?)
2003	Paraná	?	(?)
2004	Jeonnam Dragons	10	(0)
2005	Flamengo	?	(?)
2005–2006	Coritiba	?	(8)
2007–2008	Al-Ahli	?	(12)
2008	Bahia	15	(2)
2009–2010	Avaí	54	(9)
2011	Al-Khor	0	(0)
2011	Atlético Mineiro	10	(0)
2011	→ Ponte Preta (loan)	10	(1)
2012	Ponte Preta		
2012–	Goiás		
- * Club domestic league appearances and goals as of 12 May 2008

Antonio Caio da Silva Souza, shortly Caio (born November 10, 1980) is a Brazilian footballer who plays as an offensive midfielder for Goiás.

His previous club was Al-Ahli in Saudi Arabia, Coritiba (PR), Flamengo (RJ), Chunnam Dragons in South Korea, Al-Khor, in Qatar, Paraná (PR), Ituano (SP), Rio Preto (SP), Rio Branco (SP), Bahia (BA), Avaí and Atlético Mineiro.
