= Ronaldo Angelim =

Brazilian footballer

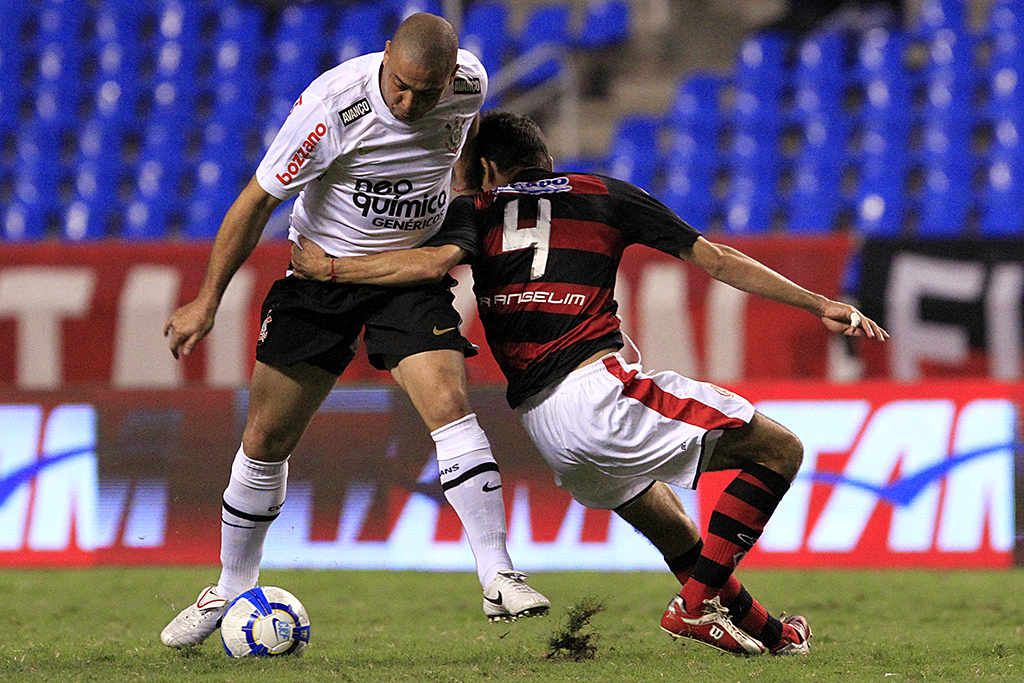

Personal information
- Full name: Ronaldo Simões Angelim
- Date of birth: November 26, 1975 (age 50)
- Place of birth: Porteiras, Ceará, Brazil
- Height: 1.78 m (5 ft 10 in)
- Position: Centre back

Senior career*
Years	Team	Apps	(Gls)
1995–1998	Icasa-CE	-	(-)
1999	Juazeiro-CE	-	(-)
1999	Ceará	-	(-)
2000	Ituano	-	(-)
2001–2005	Fortaleza	155	(9)
2006–2011	Flamengo	171	(7)
2012	Grêmio Barueri	9	(1)
2013	Fortaleza	0	(0)
- * Club domestic league appearances and goals

Ronaldo Simões Angelim (born November 26, 1975, in São Paulo), or simply Ronaldo Angelim, is a former Brazilian football central defender. He is known as the "Steel Skinny" by the soccer media in Brazil.

Angelim's history would be the same of thousand of boys that, alongside their families, went to São Paulo coming from the northeast looking for a better life quality. However, his story starts differing from the other kids when his family decides to move back to São Paulo. He was born and raised in Ceará. By that time, he tried to balance playing soccer at Icasa with working to support his humble family. Among other activities he dug wells and worked as a farmer.

In the Juazeiro do Norte soccer club, his spell was from 1996 to 1999, when the club went through one of its most delicate moments of its history, including having to change his name to escape debts that could lead the team to declare bankruptcy.

In 1999 Angelim came to Ceará to play at a traditional club from Fortaleza. In 2000, Ituano envisioned in Angelim, the sheriff commanding the team's back four who dispute the Brazilian Série C that year. With few opportunities, the defender returned a year later to Fortaleza, this time to defend his namesake club, and was in Fortaleza Esporte Clube, that Angelim that has emerged.

Known by the ability to disarm strikers, he led the team back to the first division of the 2005 Brazilian Série B, scoring a goal fifteen minutes from the end in a decisive match, which gave him cult status at the club.

== Career ==
Angelim has become one of the greatest idols of Flamengo's current generation. He is most remembered for his header goals against Vasco da Gama, in the Taca Guanabara semi final match; Grêmio, in the last round of the 2009 Brazilian Série A; and against Botafogo, in the semi-finals of the 2011 Taca Guanabara.

=== 2006 Season ===
In 2006, Angelim was signed by Flamengo, where he directly made the first squad. Although he alternated good and bad performances in the beginning, he saw innumerous defenders unsuccessfully pass through the club, while he was always kept in the squad. He debuted for the scarlet-blacks on February 2, in a 4–2 victory over Americano at Maracanã Stadium. In this game he scored one of his many goals for Flamengo. He helped the team win the Brazilian Cup, with two convincing wins against rivals, Vasco da Gama.

=== 2007 Season ===
In the second semester of 2007, along with the newly signed defender Fabio Luciano, he started having constant solid performances. The impressive defenders helped Flamengo go from the relegation zone to qualifying for the Copa Libertadores. In 2007, he won the Taça Guanabara, and consequently the Rio de Janeiro State League.

=== 2008 Season ===
In 2008, he won the Taça Rio, and consequently won Rio de Janeiro State League for the second time in a row.

On October 27, 2008, on a Brazilian national television sports show, Ronaldo paid compliments to Angelim considering him as the "ideal defender".

=== 2009 Season ===
In the beginning of the year, Angelim helped the team win the Taça Rio, and consequently won Rio de Janeiro State League for the third time in a row.

In the first half of the year suffered a rare muscular injury that almost caused him to amputate his leg. On July 22, 2009, in a 1–1 draw against Barueri, Angelim completed 100 Brazilian Série A matches for Flamengo.

In the last round of the Brazilian Série A, Angelim headed the title-winning goal against Grêmio on December 6, with capacity crowd at Maracanã Stadium. This goal gave Flamengo its sixth national title at 25 minutes of the second half. After becoming the hero of the title, Angelim declared once more his love for the club, "I consider myself a player, with game and soul. I try to play bravely because I am a flamenguista (name given to those who support Flamengo) since I was a child, and the least I can do is to put a lot of effort every time I'm on the pitch." It was the most important goal of his career. "This is a dream for me as a fan and player of Flamengo. I have to thank Pet (Petkovic) who sent over a marvellous ball for my goal".

=== 2011 Season ===
On February 21, he scored Flamengo's goal against Botafogo in the semi-finals of 2011 Taça Guanabara. The game ended up tied 1–1, and Flamengo won on the penalty kicks.

=== Flamengo career statistics ===
(Correct as of December 5, 2011)

Club	Season	Brazilian Série A		Copa do Brasil		Copa Libertadores		Copa Sudamericana		Carioca League		Total	
Club	Season	Apps	Goals	Apps	Goals	Apps	Goals	Apps	Goals	Apps	Goals	Apps	Goals
Flamengo	2006	19	1	8	2	-	-	-	-	6	1	33	4
Flamengo	2007	34	2	-	-	6	0	-	-	11	1	51	3
Flamengo	2008	35	2	-	-	8	0	-	-	14	1	57	3
Flamengo	2009	36	1	3	0	-	-	1	0	15	1	55	2
Flamengo	2010	32	1	-	-	8	1	-	-	11	1	51	3
Flamengo	2011	15	0	4	0	-	-	3	0	7	1	29	1
Total		171	7	15	2	22	1	4	0	64	6	275	16

according to combined sources on the Flamengo official website and Flaestatística.

== Honours ==
- Fortaleza
  - Ceará State League: 1999, 2001, 2003, 2004, 2005
- Flamengo
  - Copa do Brasil: 2006
  - Taça Guanabara: 2007, 2008, 2011
  - Taça Rio: 2009, 2011
  - Rio State League: 2007, 2008, 2009, 2011
  - Brazilian Série A: 2009
