= Somália (footballer, born 1984) =

Brazilian footballer

Personal information
- Full name: Paulo Rogério Reis Silva
- Date of birth: April 10, 1984 (age 42)
- Place of birth: São Paulo, Brazil
- Height: 1.77 m (5 ft 10 in)
- Positions: Defensive midfielder; wing-back

Team information
- Current team: Água Santa

Youth career
- Olímpia

Senior career*
Years	Team	Apps	(Gls)
2005	Taquaritinga		
2006	Francana		
2007–2009	Bragantino		
2009	América de Natal		
2010–2013	Botafogo		
2012	→ Ponte Preta (loan)		
2013	→ Joinville (loan)		
2013–2014	ABC		
2015–2016	CRB		
2017	América-RN		
2019–	Água Santa		
- * Club domestic league appearances and goals

Paulo Rogério Reis Silva (born April 10, 1984), nicknamed Somália, is a Brazilian footballer, who can play as a defensive midfielder and wing-back for Água Santa.

== Career ==
Silva started his football career playing for small São Paulo-based clubs. Joining Bragantino in 2007, he became noted for his shooting ability. Despite his club's poor form, Silva managed to attract the attention of Botafogo, signing a contract with the club in 2010. His good performances and versatility earned him a five-year contract with the Série A club. He has played all across the pitch for Botafogo.

== Personal life ==
=== Fake kidnapping ===
On January 7, 2011, Silva claimed he had been kidnapped at gunpoint before being robbed of money and jewelry. CCTV footage showed that he was simply late for training, and fabricated the story in order to circumvent the clubs 40% wage drop due to tardiness. Silva was charged with filing a false police report, and on January 19, 2011, he agreed to a deal offered by prosecutors to donate R$22,000 (about US$13,000) to the victims of recent floods in the state of Rio de Janeiro, in order to avoid a possible prison sentence and criminal record.

== Honors ==
Bragantino

- Campeonato Brasileiro Série C: 2007

Botafogo

- Campeonato Carioca: 2010

CRB

- Campeonato Alagoano: 2016
