= Vinícius Pacheco =

Brazilian footballer

Personal information
- Full name: Vinícius Pacheco dos Santos
- Date of birth: 27 September 1985 (age 41)
- Place of birth: São Gonçalo, Brazil
- Height: 1.73 m (5 ft 8 in)
- Position: Attacking midfielder

Team information
- Current team: Portuguesa

Senior career*
Years	Team	Apps	(Gls)
2004–2014	Flamengo	43	(2)
2007	→ Paraná Clube (loan)	26	(1)
2008	→ Ipatinga (loan)	0	(0)
2008–2009	→ Belenenses (loan)	22	(1)
2009	→ Figueirense (loan)	14	(1)
2010	→ Figueirense (loan)	9	(0)
2011	→ Grêmio (loan)	0	(0)
2011–2012	→ Red Star Belgrade (loan)	2	(0)
2013	→ Náutico (loan)	0	(0)
2013	→ América-RN (loan)	16	(3)
2015	Boavista	0	(0)
2016	Volta Redonda	0	(0)
2016–2017	Avaí	4	(1)
2017	→ Fortaleza (loan)	5	(0)
2018	Volta Redonda	3	(0)
2019	Hercílio Luz	0	(0)
2020–	Portuguesa	0	(0)
- * Club domestic league appearances and goals as of 23 January 2018

Vinícius Pacheco dos Santos (born 27 September 1985), known as Vinícius Pacheco, is a Brazilian footballer who plays as an attacking midfielder for Portuguesa.

== Club career ==
Born in São Gonçalo, Rio de Janeiro, Vinícius Pacheco started his career in Flamengo. In 2008, he joined Ipatinga on loan, but only played one match in Campeonato Mineiro before he left the club in February.

During the 2008–09 season he played on loan with Belenenses in the Portuguese Primeira Liga.

On 22 June 2011 he signed with Serbian club Red Star Belgrade. Later that day he was officially presented by the club's athletic supervisor at the club press conference. On 2 July 2011, Red Star played a friendly match against SC Columbia Floridsdorf from Austria. Pacheco broke his leg in the 40th minute of the match and was carried out of the pitch. He will make his league debut for Red Star 9 months later, on 24 March 2012, as a substitute in a 20th round match against Borac Čačak.

== Career ==
=== Career statistics ===
(Correct as of 7 April 2012)

Club	Season	League		Cup		Continental		Other		Total	
Club	Season	Apps	Goals	Apps	Goals	Apps	Goals	Apps	Goals	Apps	Goals
Flamengo	2004	4	0	1	0	-	-	2^{1}	0^{1}	7	0
Flamengo	2005	4	0	2	0	-	-	0	0	6	0
Flamengo	2006	19	2	7	0	-	-	2^{2}	0^{2}	28	2
Flamengo	Total	27	2	10	0	0	0	4	0	41	2
Paraná (loan)	2007	26	1	-	-	6	0	0	0	32	1
Ipatinga (loan)	2008	-	-	-	-	-	-	1^{3}	0^{3}	1	0
Flamengo	2008	-	-	-	-	-	-	1^{4}	0^{4}	1	0
Belenenses (loan)	2008–2009	22	1	6	2	-	-	-	-	28	3
Figueirense (loan)	2009	14	1	-	-	-	-	-	-	14	1
Flamengo	2010	16	0	-	-	9	0	15^{5}	4^{5}	40	4
Figueirense (loan)	2010	9	0	-	-	-	-	-	-	9	0
Grêmio (loan)	2011	0	0	-	-	6	2	8^{6}	1^{6}	14	3
Red Star (loan)	2011–12	2	0	0	0	0	0	-	-	2	0
Career total		116	5	16	2	21	2	29	5	182	14

according to combined sources on the Flamengo official website and Flaestatística.

- ^{1} Including 2 matches in 2004 Rio de Janeiro State League.
- ^{2} Including 2 matches in 2006 Rio de Janeiro State League.
- ^{3} Including 1 match in 2008 Minas Gerais State League.
- ^{4} Including 1 match in 2008 Rio de Janeiro State League.
- ^{5} Including 15 matches and 4 goals in 2010 Rio de Janeiro State League.
- ^{6} Including 8 matches and 1 goal in 2011 Rio Grande do Sul State League.

== Honours ==
Flamengo

- Rio de Janeiro State League (1): 2008
- Copa do Brasil (1): 2006
