= Val Baiano =

Brazilian footballer (born 1981)

Personal information
- Full name: Osvaldo Félix Souza
- Date of birth: 7 April 1981 (age 45)
- Place of birth: Jequié, Brazil
- Height: 1.83 m (6 ft 0 in)
- Position: Forward

Youth career
- 1998–2000: Poções

Senior career*
Years	Team	Apps	(Gls)
2000	Iraty	29	(1)
2001	Grêmio Maringá	8	
2002	Paranavaí	11	
2003	Santos	6	(0)
2004	Brasiliense	34	
2005	Gil Vicente	9	(0)
2006	Ceará	3	
2006	Santa Cruz	8	(0)
2007	São Caetano	60	
2007	Gama	34	(23)
2007–2008	Al-Ahli SC	1	
2008–2009	Grêmio Barueri	39	(21)
2010	Monterrey	4	(1)
2010	Flamengo	18	(3)
2011	Grêmio Barueri	16	(4)
2012	Oeste	1	(0)
2012	Grêmio Barueri		
2013	Rio Verde		
2013	Penapolense		
- * Club domestic league appearances and goals

Osvaldo Félix Souza (born 7 April 1981), known as Val Baiano, is a Brazilian former professional footballer who played as a Forward.

== Career ==
Val Baiano was born in Jequié. After playing for Iraty, Grêmio Maringá and Paranavaí, he had his first chance in a bigger club when he signed for Santos in 2003. Mainly a reserve for the team, he left the club the following year and started a journeyman career having spells with many Campeonato Brasileiro Série B clubs such as Brasiliense, Ceará, Santa Cruz and São Caetano, also playing at 2004–05 Primeira Liga for Gil Vicente.

Playing for Gama, Val Baiano was the second top goalscorer from 2007 Campeonato Brasileiro Série B with 23 goals, only behind Alessandro who scored 25 times. His good form earned him a transfer to Saudi Arabian club Al-Ahli.

In 2008, he returned to Brazil to play for Grêmio Barueri, achieving promotion to 2009 Campeonato Brasileiro Série A. Losing his place in the first team by injuries, he returned to the starting eleven when Pedrão was sold. Even though he was the club's league top goalscorer, he was dropped from the team in October after he claimed that Cruzeiro offered extra money for Grêmio Barueri to beat São Paulo. He still remained one of the competition's top scorers with 18 goals, one less than Diego Tardelli and Adriano.

In early 2010, Val Baiano was released from his contract and signed for Monterrey, also playing at 2010 Copa Libertadores for the Mexican club. After only six months at the club, he joined Flamengo., playing 18 times for Flamengo at 2010 Campeonato Brasileiro Série A but only scoring 3 times. Losing his place at the first-team and not being selected by manager Vanderlei Luxemburgo, he was released from the club in February 2011.

Val Baiano later returned to Grêmio Barueri in 2011. He joined Oeste in 2012, but was released after playing only 45 minutes in 2012 Campeonato Paulista due to injuries and being overweight.

== Career statistics ==
(Correct as of 20 December 2010)

Club	Season	Brazilian Série A		Brazilian Cup		Copa Libertadores		Copa Sudamericana		State League		Total	
Club	Season	Apps	Goals	Apps	Goals	Apps	Goals	Apps	Goals	Apps	Goals	Apps	Goals
Grêmio Barueri	2009	28	18	-	-	-	-	-	-	5	0	33	18
Club total		28	18	-	-	-	-	-	-	5	0	33	18
Flamengo	2010	18	3	-	-	-	-	-	-	-	-	18	3
Club total		18	3	0	0	-	-	0	0	0	0	18	3

according to combined sources on the Flamengo official website and Flaestatística.

== Honours ==
Brasiliense

- Brazilian Série B: 2004
