= Alessandro (footballer, born 1977) =

Brazilian footballer

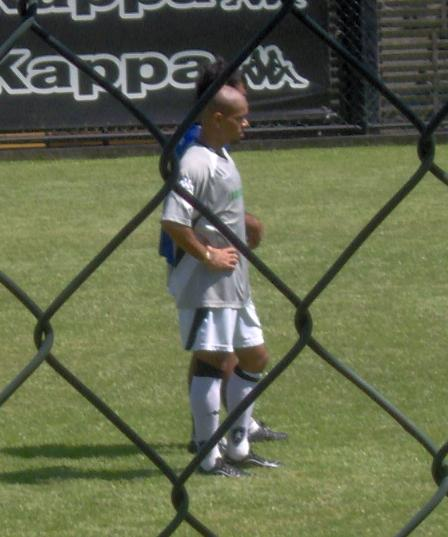
- Alessandro in January 2008

Personal information
- Full name: Alessandro da Conceição Pinto
- Date of birth: 21 September 1977 (age 49)
- Place of birth: Campos dos Goytacazes, Brazil
- Height: 1.73 m (5 ft 8 in)
- Position: Right back

Team information
- Current team: Operário

Youth career
- 1992–1994: Americano

Senior career*
Years	Team	Apps	(Gls)
1994–1998	Vasco da Gama		
1998	Campo Grande		
1999	Ituano		
1999	Mirassol		
2000	Bangu	27	(1)
2000–2004	Atlético Paranaense	93	(2)
2004	→ Atlético Mineiro (loan)	31	(1)
2005–2007	São Caetano	43	(1)
2007–2011	Botafogo	117	(4)
2012	Botafogo-SP	13	(0)
2012	Náutico	10	(0)
2013–2014	Metropolitano	18	(5)
2015–2016	Atlético Paranaense	1	(0)
2016–	Operário	0	(0)

International career
2001	Brazil	3	(0)
- * Club domestic league appearances and goals as of October 31, 2012

Alessandro da Conceição Pinto (born 21 September 1977 in Campos dos Goytacazes), better known as just Alessandro, is a Brazilian footballer who plays for Operário as a right back.

== Honours ==
Vasco da Gama

- Série A: 1997
- Taça Guanabara: 1998
- Taça Rio: 1998
- Campeonato Carioca: 1998

Atlético Paranaense

- Campeonato Paranaense: 2001, 2002
- Série A: 2001

Botafogo

- Taça Rio: 2007, 2008
- Taça Guanabara: 2009
