= Fahel =

Brazilian footballer (born 1981)

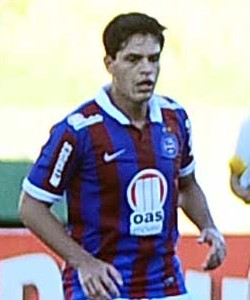

Personal information
- Full name: Leandro Fahel Matos
- Date of birth: 15 August 1981 (age 45)
- Place of birth: Teófilo Otoni, Brazil
- Height: 1.82 m (5 ft 11 1/2 in)
- Position: Defensive midfielder

Senior career*
Years	Team	Apps	(Gls)
2003–2005	América (MG)	-	(-)
2005–2006	Marítimo	1	(0)
2005	→ Ipatinga (loan)	-	(-)
2005	Cruzeiro	-	(-)
2007	→ Paços Ferreira (loan)	14	(1)
2007	Marítimo	18	(1)
2007–2008	Beira-Mar	21	(1)
2008	Atlético Paranaense	3	(0)
2008	→ Goiás (loan)	18	(2)
2009–2010	Villa Rio	0	(0)
2009–2010	→ Botafogo (loan)	31	(1)
2010–2011	Botafogo	25	(0)
2011–2014	Bahia	34	(3)
2015–2016	Paysandu	37	(5)
2016	Novorizontino	9	(2)
2016–2017	Juventude	0	(0)

Managerial career
- 2018–2021: Juventude (assistant)
- 2019: Juventude (caretaker)
- * Club domestic league appearances and goals as of 26 May 2016

Leandro Fahel Matos or simply Fahel (born 15 August 1981 in Teófilo Otoni), is a Brazilian football coach and former player who played as a defensive midfielder.

He previously played for Atlético Paranaense and Botafogo.

== Honours ==
Botafogo

- Taça Guanabara: 2009, 2010
- Taça Rio: 2010
- Campeonato Carioca: 2010

Bahia

- Campeonato Baiano: 2012
