= Rodrigo Alvim =

Brazilian footballer

Personal information
- Full name: Rodrigo Oliveira da Silva Alvim
- Date of birth: 25 November 1983 (age 42)
- Place of birth: Porto Alegre, Brazil
- Height: 1.82 m (6 ft 0 in)
- Position: Left-back

Youth career
- 1997–2002: Grêmio

Senior career*
Years	Team	Apps	(Gls)
2003	Caxias do Sul		
2004–2005	Grêmio	0	(0)
2006	Paraná	1	(0)
2006–2008	Belenenses	57	(1)
2008–2010	VfL Wolfsburg	2	(0)
2010–2012	Flamengo	19	(0)
2012	Joinville	2	(0)
2013	Paysandu	1	(0)
2014	Miami Dade		
- * Club domestic league appearances and goals

Rodrigo Oliveira da Silva Alvim (born 23 November 1983) is a Brazilian former professional footballer who played as a left-back.

== Club career ==
Born in Porto Alegre, Alvim made his professional debut in 2003 with Sociedade Esportiva e Recreativa Caxias do Sul. He went on to represent Grêmio FBPA and Paraná Clube in his country and, in June 2006, he moved to Portuguese club C.F. Os Belenenses.

After two impressive Primeira Liga seasons with the Lisbon team, coached by Jorge Jesus, Alvim signed a three-year deal with VfL Wolfsburg in late July 2008. He was crowned Bundesliga champion in his first season, but contributed only 24 minutes to that feat.

On 25 January 2010, Alvim's contract with Wolfsburg was terminated and, the following day, he returned to Brazil and joined defending Série A champions CR Flamengo.

== Honours ==
Wolfsburg

- Bundesliga: 2008–09

Flamengo

- Campeonato Carioca: 2011
