= Diego Lima (footballer, born 1990) =

Brazilian footballer

Personal information
- Full name: Diego Lima da Silva
- Date of birth: June 18, 1990 (age 36)
- Place of birth: Rio de Janeiro, Brazil
- Height: 1.84 m (6 ft 0 in)
- Position: Goalkeeper

Youth career
- 2006–2010: Flamengo

Senior career*
Years	Team	Apps	(Gls)
2010–?	Flamengo	0	(0)
2011	→ América (Teófilo Otoni) (loan)	0	(0)
- * Club domestic league appearances and goals

Diego Lima da Silva (born June 18, 1990) is a Brazilian former footballer who played as a goalkeeper.

== Career ==
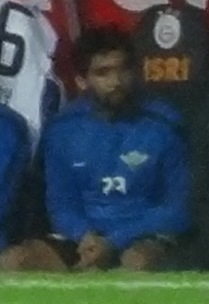
Diego da Costa Lima in the stands for Flamengo

Diego Lima da Silva was the goalkeeper of the Flamengo youth team in 2007. In 2006, his first year in the category won the Campeonato Carioca de Juvenis. The next year, lifted the Copa Macaé and Torneio Circuito das Águas.

The shirt also had an opportunity in the juniores category. He joined a group that ranked third in the Champions Youth Cup, the interclub championship for players under 19 years.

In 2010, he had his first chance with the professional group of Flamengo and traveled to the intertemporal in Itu, São Paulo, in preparation for the sequel to the Campeonato Brasileiro.
