= Túlio Souza =

Brazilian footballer

Personal information
- Full name: Túlio Gustavo Cunha Souza
- Date of birth: 25 March 1983 (age 43)
- Place of birth: Campina Grande, Brazil
- Height: 1.76 m (5 ft 9 in)
- Position: Defensive midfielder

Team information
- Current team: Brasil de Pelotas

Youth career
- 1999–2000: Sport

Senior career*
Years	Team	Apps	(Gls)
2001–2002	Sport	1	(0)
2003–2004	Bahia		
2004	CRB		
2005	Ceará		
2005	Treze		
2005	CRB		
2005	Itacuruba		
2005	→ Juventude (loan)	1	(0)
2005	Ulbra		
2005–2006	→ Santo André (loan)		
2006	Guarani		
2007	→ Coritiba (loan)		
2008–2011	Botafogo	32	(2)
2011	→ Botafogo-SP (loan)	6	(1)
2011	→ Duque de Caxias (loan)	6	(0)
2011	→ Vila Nova (loan)	9	(3)
2012	Itumbiara	2	(0)
2013	Boavista	7	(0)
2013–2014	Al-Faisaly Amman		
2014	Brasil de Pelotas	15	(2)
2014	Paraná	12	(0)
2015	Marcílio Dias	1	(0)
2015	Botafogo-PB		
- * Club domestic league appearances and goals

Túlio Gustavo Cunha Souza, commonly known as Túlio Souza (born 25 March 1983), is a Brazilian former soccer player who played as a defensive midfielder.

== Honours ==
- Pernambuco State League: 2001
- Paraíba State League: 2005
- Taça Rio: 2008
