= Toró =

Brazilian footballer

Personal information
- Full name: Rafael Ferreira Francisco
- Date of birth: 13 April 1986 (age 40)
- Place of birth: Rio de Janeiro, RJ, Brazil
- Height: 1.70 m (5 ft 7 in)
- Position: Defensive midfielder

Team information
- Current team: GBK
- Number: 50

Youth career
- 2004: Fluminense

Senior career*
Years	Team	Apps	(Gls)
2005	Fluminense	4	(1)
2006–2010	Flamengo	97	(4)
2011–2012	Atlético Mineiro	9	(1)
2012	→ Figueirense (loan)	13	(0)
2013	Bahia	2	(0)
2014–2016	Sagamihara	38	(3)
2016	→ Anápolis (loan)	0	(0)
2017	Goiás	2	(0)
2018	Sagamihara	9	(0)
2019–2020	HIFK	14	(0)
2020	→ FF Jaro (loan)	19	(1)
2021–2022	FF Jaro	20	(1)
2022–	GBK	17	(0)
- * Club domestic league appearances and goals as of 1 October 2022

Rafael Ferreira Francisco (born 13 April 1986) usually known by the nickname Toró, is a Brazilian professional footballer who plays as a defensive midfielder for Finnish club GBK.
