= Pituca (footballer, born 1978) =

Brazilian footballer

Personal information
- Full name: Claussio dos Santos Dimas
- Date of birth: 8 October 1978 (age 48)
- Place of birth: São Luís, Maranhão, Brazil
- Height: 1.88 m (6 ft 2 in)
- Position: Midfielder

Senior career*
Years	Team	Apps	(Gls)
2000	Dom Pedro		
2001–2002	Ceilândia		
2002–2005	Brasiliense		
2006	Atlético Goianiense		
2006	Ponte Preta		
2007–2008	Atlético Goianiense		
2008	Goiás		
2008	Paraná		
2009–2014	Atlético Goianiense		
2015	CRAC		
- * Club domestic league appearances and goals

Claussio dos Santos Dimas (born 8 October 1978), known as Pituca, is a Brazilian former professional footballer who played as a midfielder.

== Career ==
Pituca spent much of his playing career with Atlético Clube Goianiense, but joined arch-rivals Clube Recreativo e Atlético Catalano in 2015.
