= Fábio Ferreira (footballer, born 1984) =

Brazilian footballer

Personal information
- Full name: Fábio Ferreira da Silva
- Date of birth: 4 October 1984 (age 42)
- Place of birth: Campina Grande, Brazil
- Height: 1.87 m (6 ft 2 in)
- Position: Centre back

Youth career
- 2003–2004: Corinthians

Senior career*
Years	Team	Apps	(Gls)
2004–2008	Corinthians	33	(2)
2005–2006	→ Noroeste (loan)	32	(3)
2006	→ Juventude (loan)	17	(0)
2006	→ Noroeste (loan)	21	(1)
2009	Grêmio	0	(0)
2009	Vitória	19	(0)
2010–2012	Botafogo	89	(2)
2013–2015	Criciúma	65	(3)
2015–2018	Ponte Preta	52	(3)
2018	Novorizontino	4	(0)
2018	Criciúma	26	(1)
- * Club domestic league appearances and goals

Fábio Ferreira da Silva (born 4 October 1984), known as Fábio Ferreira, is a Brazilian former footballer who played as a central defender.

== Honours ==
Corinthians

- Campeonato Brasileiro Série A: 2005
- Campeonato Brasileiro Série B: 2008

Botafogo

- Taça Guanabara: 2010
- Taça Rio: 2010, 2012
- Campeonato Carioca: 2010

Criciúma

- Campeonato Catarinense: 2013
