= 2009 CR Flamengo season =

Flamengo
2009 season
- Chairman: Márcio Braga
- Manager: Cuca; Andrade
- Brazilian Série A: Champions
- Rio de Janeiro State League: Champions
- Copa do Brasil: Quarter-finals
- Copa Sudamericana: First stage
- Top goalscorer: League: Adriano (19 goals); All: Adriano (19 goals)
- Highest home attendance: 78,639 (vs. Grêmio in the Brazilian Série A)
- Lowest home attendance: (vs. in the )
| Home colours | Away colours |

The 2009 season is the 114th year in the club's history, the 98th season in Clube de Regatas do Flamengo's football existence, and their 39th in the Brazilian Série A, having never been relegated from the top division.

== Other information ==
| Chairman | (Brazil) Márcio Braga |
| Ground (capacity and dimensions) | Maracanã (88,992 / 110x75 meters) |

Source: CBF

== First-team squad ==
As of December, 2010, according to combined sources on the official website.

Note: Flags indicate national team as defined under FIFA eligibility rules; some limited exceptions apply. Players may hold more than one non-FIFA nationality.

| No. | Pos. | Nation | Player |
|---|---|---|---|
| 1 | GK | BRA | Bruno (captain) |
| 2 | DF | BRA | Leonardo Moura |
| 4 | DF | BRA | Ronaldo Angelim |
| 5 | MF | BRA | Airton |
| 6 | DF | BRA | Juan |
| 7 | MF | BRA | Ibson (on loan from F.C. Porto) |
| 8 | MF | BRA | Willians |
| 9 | MF | BRA | Denis Marques (on loan from Omiya Ardija) |
| 10 | FW | BRA | Adriano |
| 13 | MF | CHI | Claudio Maldonado |
| 14 | DF | BRA | Alvaro |
| 15 | MF | BRA | Kléberson |
| 16 | MF | CHI | Gonzalo Fierro |
| 17 | FW | ARG | Maxi Biancucchi |
| 18 | FW | BRA | Gil |
| 19 | DF | BRA | Everton Silva (on loan from Friburguense) |
| 20 | GK | BRA | Diego |
| 21 | MF | BRA | Toró |

| No. | Pos. | Nation | Player |
|---|---|---|---|
| 22 | MF | BRA | Everton |
| 23 | DF | BRA | Welinton Silva |
| 26 | FW | BRA | Zé Roberto (on loan from Schalke 04) |
| 27 | GK | BRA | Paulo Victor |
| 28 | DF | BRA | Fabrício |
| 29 | GK | BRA | Marcelo Lomba |
| 30 | MF | BRA | Erick Flores |
| 33 | MF | BRA | Lenon |
| 34 | MF | BRA | Guilherme Camacho |
| 35 | DF | BRA | Jorbison |
| 36 | FW | BRA | Bruno Paulo |
| 37 | FW | BRA | Bruno Mezenga |
| 38 | DF | BRA | Marlon |
| 39 | MF | BRA | Rômulo |
| 40 | DF | BRA | David (on loan from Panathinaikos) |
| 42 | DF | BRA | Rafael Galhardo |
| 43 | MF | SRB | Dejan Petković |

Players with Dual Nationality

- (Brazil) (Spain) Juan

== Transfer ==
=== In ===
Note: Flags indicate national team as defined under FIFA eligibility rules; some limited exceptions apply. Players may hold more than one non-FIFA nationality.

| No. | Pos. | Nation | Player |
|---|---|---|---|
| — | MF | BRA | Dieguinho (transfer from Nova Iguaçu) |
| — | DF | BRA | Douglas (loan from Atlético Paranaense) |
| — | MF | BRA | Willians (transfer from Santo André) |
| — | DF | BRA | Fabrício (loan return from Paraná) |
| — | GK | BRA | Diego (loan from Madureira) |
| — | DF | BRA | Eltinho (Released) |
| — | MF | BRA | Léo Medeiros (loan return from Atlético Paranaense) |
| — | DF | BRA | Egídio (loan return from Juventude) |
| — | MF | BRA | Rômulo (loan return from Paraná) |
| — | MF | BRA | Guilherme Camacho (loan return from Paraná) |
| — | DF | BRA | Everton Silva (loan from Friburguense) |
| — | MF | BRA | Zé Roberto (loan from Schalke 04) |
| — | MF | BRA | Alex Cruz (loan from Ivinhema) |
| — | FW | QAT | Emerson (signed as a free agent) |
| — | FW | BRA | Adriano (signed as a free agent) |
| — | FW | BRA | Aleílson (loan from Águia de Marabá) |

| No. | Pos. | Nation | Player |
|---|---|---|---|
| — | MF | SRB | Dejan Petković (signed as a free agent) |
| — | FW | BRA | Arthuro (signed as a free agent) |
| — | DF | BRA | Davidson (loan return from Volta Redonda) |
| — | DF | BRA | Fabrício (loan return from TSG Hoffenheim) |
| — | MF | BRA | Vinícius Pacheco (loan return from Belenenses) |
| — | MF | BRA | Alex Cruz (transfer from Ivinhema) |
| — | DF | BRA | Marlon (loan return from Thrasyvoulos Fylis) |
| — | FW | BRA | Fabiano Oliveira (loan return from Nacional) |
| — | FW | BRA | Bruno Mezenga (loan return from Orduspor) |
| — | FW | BRA | Denis Marques (loan from Omiya Ardija) |
| — | MF | BRA | Ives (signed as free agent) |
| — | DF | BRA | David Braz (loan from Panathinaikos) |
| — | MF | BRA | Rômulo (loan return from Figueirense) |
| — | MF | CHI | Claudio Maldonado (signed as a free agent) |
| — | DF | BRA | Álvaro (transfer from Internacional) |
| — | FW | BRA | Gil (transfer from Internacional) |

=== Out ===
Note: Flags indicate national team as defined under FIFA eligibility rules; some limited exceptions apply. Players may hold more than one non-FIFA nationality.

| No. | Pos. | Nation | Player |
|---|---|---|---|
| — | DF | BRA | Dininho (free transfer to Santo André) |
| — | GK | BRA | Diego (end of contract) |
| — | MF | BRA | Jaílton (transfer to Fluminense) |
| — | DF | BRA | Leonardo (released) |
| — | DF | BRA | Davidson (loan to Volta Redonda) |
| — | MF | BRA | Rodrigo Broa (loan to Campinense) |
| — | MF | BRA | Fernando (loan to Volta Redonda) |
| — | FW | BRA | Fernandão (released) |
| — | MF | BRA | Fellype Gabriel (transfer to Portuguesa) |
| — | MF | BRA | Léo Medeiros (transfer to Bahia) |
| — | FW | BRA | Diego Tardelli (transfer to Atlético Mineiro) |
| — | MF | ARG | Rubens Sambueza (loan return to River Plate) |
| — | MF | BRA | Rômulo (loan to Figueirense) |
| — | DF | BRA | Fabrício (loan to 1899 Hoffenheim) |
| — | FW | BRA | Vandinho (transfer to Sport Recife) |
| — | MF | BRA | Marcelinho Paraíba (transfer to Coritiba) |
| — | MF | BRA | Fernando (released) |

| No. | Pos. | Nation | Player |
|---|---|---|---|
| — | DF | BRA | Fabio Luciano (retired) |
| — | DF | BRA | Egídio (loan to Figueirense) |
| — | FW | BRA | Paulo Sérgio (loan to Figueirense) |
| — | MF | BRA | Vinícius Pacheco (loan to Figueirense) |
| — | DF | BRA | Douglas (loan return to Atlético Paranaense) |
| — | MF | BRA | Ives (released) |
| — | FW | BRA | Arthuro (released) |
| — | FW | BRA | Josiel (loan return to Al-Wahda) |
| — | MF | BRA | Jônatas (loan return to Espanyol) |
| — | MF | BRA | Alex Cruz (loan return to Ivinhema) |
| — | MF | BRA | Ibson (loan return to FC Porto) |
| — | FW | BRA | Fabiano Oliveira (loan to Giresunspor) |
| — | FW | QAT | Emerson (transfer to Al Ain FC) |
| — | DF | BRA | Davidson (loan to Tombense) |
| — | MF | BRA | Diguinho (loan to America) |
| — | MF | BRA | Vander (loan to America) |

== Competitions ==
=== First round ===
| 4 March | Ivinhema (Mato Grosso do Sul) | 0–5 | (Rio de Janeiro (state)) Flamengo | Morenão |
| 21:50 (UTC−03:00) | Itawa (yellow card); Formigão (yellow card) (yellow-red card) | | Léo Moura 19'; Zé Roberto 37' 45'; Kleberson 84'; Maxi Biancucchi 90'; Fábio Luciano (yellow card); Airton (yellow card); Toró (yellow card); Obina (yellow card) | Attendance: N/A; Referee: André Luiz de Freitas Castro |

=== Second round ===
| 9 April | Remo (Pará) | 0–2 | (Rio de Janeiro (state)) Flamengo | Belém |
| 21:50 (UTC−03:00) | | | | Stadium: Estádio Olímpico do Pará (Mangueirão); Attendance: 40.846 |

=== Round of 16 ===
| 30 April First leg | Flamengo (Rio de Janeiro (state)) | 0–0 | (Ceará) Fortaleza | Rio de Janeiro |
| 21:50 (UTC−03:00) | | | | Stadium: Maracanã |

| 7 May Second leg | (Ceará) Fortaleza | 0-3 (0-3 agg.) | (Rio de Janeiro (state)) Flamengo | Fortaleza |
| 21:50 (UTC−03:00) | | | | Stadium: Estádio Plácido Aderaldo Castelo (Castelão) |

=== Quarterfinals ===
| 14 May First leg | Flamengo (Rio de Janeiro (state)) | 0–0 | (Rio Grande do Sul) Internacional | Rio de Janeiro |
| 21:50 (UTC−03:00) | | | | Stadium: Maracanã |

| 21 May Second leg | Internacional (Rio Grande do Sul) | 2–1 (2–1 agg.) | (Rio de Janeiro (state)) Flamengo | Porto Alegre |
| 21:50 (UTC−03:00) | | | | Stadium: Estádio Beira-Rio |

=== Série A ===
==== Standings ====
| Pos | Team | Pld | W | D | L | GF | GA | GD | Pts | Qualification or relegation |
|---|---|---|---|---|---|---|---|---|---|---|
| 1 | Flamengo (C) | 38 | 19 | 10 | 9 | 58 | 44 | +14 | 67 | 2010 Copa Libertadores Second Stage |
| 2 | Internacional | 38 | 19 | 8 | 11 | 65 | 44 | +21 | 65 | 2010 Copa Libertadores Second Stage |
| 3 | São Paulo | 38 | 18 | 11 | 9 | 57 | 42 | +15 | 65 | 2010 Copa Libertadores Second Stage |
| 4 | Cruzeiro | 38 | 18 | 8 | 12 | 58 | 53 | +5 | 62 | 2010 Copa Libertadores First Stage |
| 5 | Palmeiras | 38 | 17 | 11 | 10 | 58 | 45 | +13 | 62 | 2010 Copa Sudamericana Second Stage |

Source: CBF (in Portuguese)
Rules for classification: 1st points; 2nd wins; 3rd goal difference; 4th goals scored; 5th head-to-head results; 6th least red cards received; 7th least yellow cards received; 8th draw
(C) Champions

=== Results summary ===
| Overall | | | | | | | | Home | | | | | | Away | | | | | |
| Pld | W | D | L | GF | GA | GD | Pts | W | D | L | GF | GA | GD | W | D | L | GF | GA | GD |
|---|---|---|---|---|---|---|---|---|---|---|---|---|---|---|---|---|---|---|---|
| 38 | 19 | 10 | 9 | 58 | 44 | +14 | 67 | 12 | 5 | 2 | 34 | 13 | +21 | 7 | 5 | 7 | 24 | 31 | −7 |

Last updated: 2011-11-12.
Source: Série A 2009

Pld=Matches played; W=Matches won; D=Matches drawn; L=Matches lost;

==== Results by round ====
| Round | 1 | 2 | 3 | 4 | 5 | 6 | 7 | 8 | 9 | 10 | 11 | 12 | 13 | 14 | 15 | 16 | 17 | 18 | 19 | 20 | 21 | 22 | 23 | 24 | 25 | 26 | 27 | 28 | 29 | 30 | 31 | 32 | 33 | 34 | 35 | 36 | 37 | 38 |
|---|---|---|---|---|---|---|---|---|---|---|---|---|---|---|---|---|---|---|---|---|---|---|---|---|---|---|---|---|---|---|---|---|---|---|---|---|---|---|
| Ground | A | H | A | H | A | A | H | A | H | A | H | H | H | A | H | H | A | H | A | H | A | H | A | H | H | A | H | A | H | A | A | A | H | A | A | H | A | H |
| Result | L | D | W | W | L | L | W | D | W | D | L | D | D | W | W | D | L | W | L | L | L | W | D | W | W | D | W | D | W | W | W | L | W | W | W | D | W | W |
| Position | 19 | 19 | 11 | 6 | 11 | 11 | 6 | 7 | 6 | 7 | 9 | 8 | 8 | 7 | 5 | 5 | 7 | 6 | 7 | 9 | 10 | 10 | 9 | 8 | 7 | 6 | 6 | 6 | 6 | 2 | 6 | 7 | 4 | 3 | 2 | 2 | 1 | 1 |

Updated to match(es) played on 12 November. Source: Matches
A = Away; H = Home; W = Win; D = Draw; L = Loss

==== Matches ====
| 10 May Matchday 1 | Cruzeiro | 2–0 | Flamengo | Belo Horizonte |
| 16:00 (UTC−03:00) | Kleber 30'; Ramires 89'; Henrique (yellow card) 21'; Wagner (yellow card) 44'; Ramires (yellow card) 89'; Gérson Magrão (yellow card) 90' | | (yellow card) 3' Willians; (yellow card) 33' Ronaldo Angelim; (yellow card) 52' Emerson | Stadium: Estádio do Mineirão; Attendance: 24.564; Referee: Paulo César de Oliveira |

| 16 May Matchday 2 | Flamengo | 0–0 | Avaí | Rio de Janeiro |
| 18:30 (UTC−03:00) | Airton (yellow card) 39' | | (yellow card) 31' Caio; (yellow card) 42' Muriqui; (yellow card) 45' Marcus Vinícius; (yellow card) 59' Ferdinando; (yellow card) 88' Bruno Silva; (yellow card) 90' Émerson | Stadium: Estádio do Maracanã; Attendance: 18.351; Referee: Francisco Carlos do Nascimento |

| 24 May Matchday 3 | Santo André | 1–2 | Flamengo | Santo André |
| 18:30 (UTC−03:00) | Ricardo Conceição 43'; Díonísio (yellow card) 64'; Dutra (yellow card) 90+3' | | 32' 66' Josiel; (yellow card) 67' Willians; (yellow card) 69' Toró; (yellow card) 90' Erick Flores | Stadium: Estádio Bruno José Daniel; Attendance: 8.819; Referee: Arilson Bispo da Anunciação |

| 31 May Matchday 4 | Flamengo | 2–1 | Atlético Paranaense | Rio de Janeiro |
| 16:00 (UTC−03:00) | Antônio Carlos 15'(o.g.); Adriano 47'; Léo Moura (yellow card) 63'; Everton Silva (yellow card) 90' | | Moura 69' (yellow card) 45' Rhodolfo; (yellow card) 70' Chico; (yellow card) 85' Márcio Azevedo | Stadium: Estádio do Maracanã; Attendance: 68.217; Referee: Leonardo Gaciba |

| 7 June Matchday 5 | Sport | 4–2 | Flamengo | Recife |
| 16:00 (UTC−03:00) | Durval 26'; Weldon 27' 30' 34'; Juliano Cavalheiro (yellow card) 19'; Luciano Henrique (yellow card) 42'; Sandro Goiano (yellow card) 48'; Dutra (yellow card) 82'; Ciro (yellow card) 86' | | 5' 9' Emerson; (yellow card) 29' Ronaldo Angelim; (yellow card) 53' Airton; (yellow card) 71' Willians | Stadium: Estádio Ilha do Retiro; Attendance: 25.603; Referee: Cleber Wellington Abade |

| 14 June Matchday 6 | Coritiba | 5–0 | Flamengo | Curitiba |
| 16:00 (UTC−03:00) | Welinton 7'(o.g.); Marcos Aurélio 41'; Bruno Batata 46' 61'; Leozinho 74'; Pedro Ken (yellow card) 1'; Leandro Donizete (yellow card) 33'; Ariel Nahuelpan (red card); Rodrigo Heffner (yellow card) 55'; Felipe (yellow card) 76' (yellow-red card) 78'; Leozinho (yellow card) 77' | | (yellow card) 5' Juan; (red card) Airton; (yellow card) 73' Éverton Silva | Stadium: Estádio Couto Pereira; Attendance: 20.592; Referee: Wilson Luiz Seneme |

| 21 June Matchday 7 | Flamengo | 4–0 | Internacional | Rio de Janeiro |
| 18:30 (UTC−03:00) | Adriano 12' 46' 66'(pen.); Émerson 35'; Ronaldo Angelim (yellow card) 11'; Fabrício (yellow card) 33'; Bruno (yellow card) 43'; Émerson (yellow card) 77' | | (yellow card) 18' Pablo Guiñazú; (yellow card) 26' Sandro; (yellow card) 29' Giuliano; (yellow card) 48' Alvaro; (yellow card) 65' Glaydson | Stadium: Estádio do Maracanã; Attendance: 15.864; Referee: José Henrique de Carvalho |

| 28 June Matchday 8 | Fluminense | 0–0 | Flamengo | Rio de Janeiro |
| 18:30 (UTC−03:00) | Luiz Alberto (yellow card) 21'; Edcarlos (yellow card) 70' | | (yellow card) 10' Ibson; (yellow card) 85' Everton Silva; (yellow card) 86' Willians | Stadium: Estádio do Maracanã; Attendance: 41.038; Referee: Sálvio Spínola Fagundes Filho |

| 4 July Matchday 9 | Flamengo | 2–1 | Vitória | Rio de Janeiro |
| 18:30 (UTC−03:00) | Juan 27'; Emerson 67'; Kleberson (yellow card) 47' (yellow-red card) 90'; Emerson (yellow card) 83' | | 61' Roger; (yellow card) 56' Anderson Martins; (yellow card) 62' Apodi; (yellow card) 78' Uelliton; Vanderson (red card) | Stadium: Estádio Olímpico João Havelange (Engenhão); Attendance: 20.296; Referee: Nielson Nogueira Dias |

| 12 July Matchday 10 | São Paulo | 2–2 | Flamengo | São Paulo |
| 16:00 (UTC−03:00) | Borges 18'; Jorge Wagner 64'(pen.); Renato Silva (yellow card) 20' (yellow-red card) 44'; Jorge Wagner (yellow card) 66' | | 3' Gonzalo Fierro; 21'(pen.) Adriano; (yellow card) 24' Gonzalo Fierro; (yellow card) 31' Welinton; (yellow card) 37' Everton Silva; (yellow card) 38' Bruno; (yellow card) 38' Adriano; (yellow card) 49' Léo Moura; (yellow card) 63' Willians; (yellow card) 80' Éverton; (yellow card) 89' Fabrício | Stadium: Estádio do Morumbi; Attendance: 21.648; Referee: Ricardo Marques Ribeiro |

| 16 July Matchday 11 | Flamengo | 1–2 | Palmeiras | Rio de Janeiro |
| 21:50 (UTC−03:00) | Adriano 71'(pen.); Welinton (yellow card) 7'; Willians (yellow card) 45'; Zé Roberto (yellow card) 75'; Éverton (yellow card) 90+2' | | 24' Diego Souza; 43' José Ortigoza; (yellow card) 18' Pierre; (yellow card) 71' Danilo | Stadium: Estádio do Maracanã; Attendance: 22.861; Referee: Leandro Pedro Vuaden |

| 19 July Matchday 12 | Flamengo | 2–2 | Botafogo | Rio de Janeiro |
| 18:30 (UTC−03:00) | Adriano 40'; Emerson 88'; Kléberson (yellow card) 31'; Everton (yellow card) 54'; Welinton (yellow card) 61'; Fabrício (yellow card) 69' | (Report) | 34' Alessandro; 71' Renato; (yellow card) 35' Juan Castillo; (yellow card) 49' Thiaguinho; (yellow card) 55' Victor Simões; (yellow card) 73' André Lima; (yellow card) 83' Eduardo Neto; (red card) Alessandro | Stadium: Estádio do Maracanã; Attendance: 29.508; Referee: Pericles Bassols Pegado Cortez |

== See also ==
- Clube de Regatas do Flamengo
