= Paulo Victor (footballer, born 1987) =

Brazilian footballer

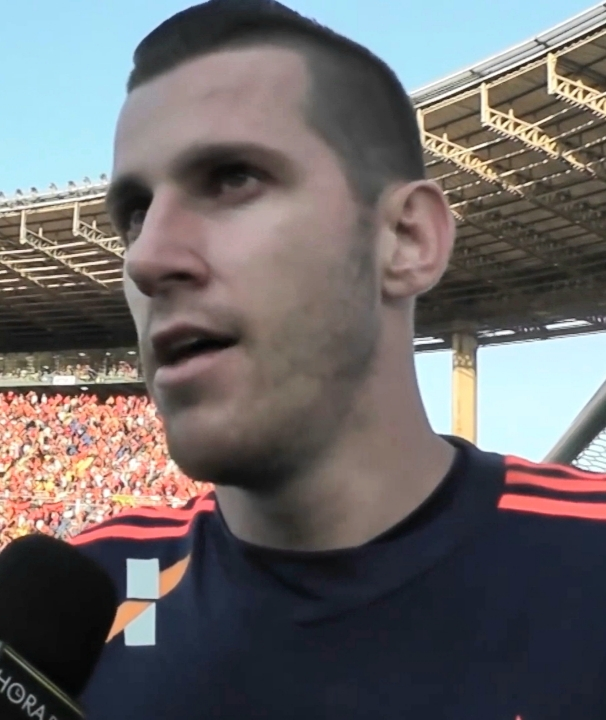
- Paulo Victor in 2015

Personal information
- Full name: Paulo Victor Mileo Vidotti
- Date of birth: 12 January 1987 (age 39)
- Place of birth: Assis, Brazil
- Height: 1.87 m (6 ft 2 in)
- Position: Goalkeeper

Team information
- Current team: Alanyaspor
- Number: 48

Youth career
- 1995–2004: Assisense
- 2004–2007: Flamengo

Senior career*
Years	Team	Apps	(Gls)
2007–2017	Flamengo	94	(0)
2008	→ America-RJ (loan)	0	(0)
2017	→ Gaziantepspor (loan)	14	(0)
2017–2021	Grêmio	69	(0)
2021–2022	Marítimo	30	(0)
2022–2024	Al-Ettifaq	64	(0)
2024–2025	Al-Rayyan	0	(0)
2025–	Alanyaspor	0	(0)
- * Club domestic league appearances and goals as of 23 November 2025

Paulo Victor Mileo Vidotti (born 12 January 1987) is a Brazilian professional footballer who plays as a goalkeeper for Turkish Süper Lig club Alanyaspor.

== Career ==
=== Early life and Assisense ===
Paulo Victor started playing school football at Peraltinha located in the city of Assis, which was directed by the coach Roberto Carlos Amoriélli.

In 2004, Paulo Victor played for Assisense in the Campeonato Paulista da Segunda Divisão. That year the team did not rise to the Campeonato Paulista Série A3 by just two goals.

=== Flamengo ===
He arrived at Flamengo in 2004, at 17 years old, and won many titles with the club's youth team, such as the youth Campeonato Carioca de Juniores three times (2005, 2006, and 2007), the Torneio Octávio Pinto Guimarães twice (2006 and 2007), and the Copa Record Rio de Futebol (2005).

He was promoted from the youth team in the beginning of 2007 by coach Ney Franco. In 2008 Paulo had his first chance at playing at a professional level on loan at America-RJ, where he played 13 matches in the Campeonato Carioca.

Paulo Victor became the team's second choice goalkeeper after Bruno and Diego left the club in 2010.

In the last match of the 2010 Campeonato Brasileiro Série A, Paulo Victor made his debut for the club's professional team in a match against Santos at Vila Belmiro, which ended 0-0.

He became the club's first-choice goalkeeper after Marcelo Lomba transferred to Flamengo in 2011.

==== Gaziantepspor (loan) ====
On January 26, 2017 Gaziantepspor signed Paulo Victor on loan until the end of the 2017-18 season. He debuted in the Turkish league three days later against Trabzonspor in a 4-0 loss. Despite having a long loan contract with the Turkish club, Paulo Victor re-signed with Gaziantepspor due to wage arrears.

=== Grêmio ===
From 2017 to 2021, Paulo Victor played for Brazilian club Grêmio, featuring in a total of 108 games for the side and winning the 2017 Copa Libertadores and the 2018 Recopa Sudamericana. On August 3, 2021, Paulo Victor terminated his contract with the club making him a free agent.

=== Marítimo ===
On August 6, 2021 Portuguese club Marítimo signed Paulo Victor on a free transfer, with a one-year contract agreed.

=== Al-Ettifaq ===
On 8 July 2022, Paulo Victor joined Saudi Arabian club Al-Ettifaq on a one-year deal with an option to extend for a further year.

== Career statistics ==
As of match played 12 September 2023

Appearances and goals by club, season and competition
Club	Season	League			National cup (Note: Includes Copa do Brasil, King Cup)		Continental		Other		Total	
Club	Season	Division	Apps	Goals	Apps	Goals	Apps	Goals	Apps	Goals	Apps	Goals
Flamengo	2007	Série A	0	0	—		0	0	0	0	0	0
Flamengo	2008	Série A	0	0	—		0	0	0	0	0	0
Flamengo	2009	Série A	0	0	0	0	0	0	0	0	0	0
Flamengo	2010	Série A	1	0	0	0	0	0	0	0	1	0
Flamengo	2011	Série A	3	0	0	0	1	0	0	0	4	0
Flamengo	2012	Série A	19	0	—		2	0	5 (Note: Appearance(s) in Campeonato Carioca.)	0	26	0
Flamengo	2013	Série A	13	0	2	0	—		1	0	16	0
Flamengo	2014	Série A	29	0	6	0	0	0	3	0	38	0
Flamengo	2015	Série A	24	0	5	0	—		15	0	44	0
Flamengo	2016	Série A	5	0	4	0	1	0	19 (Note: Fifteen appearances in Campeonato Carioca, four appearances in Primeira Liga.)	0	29	0
Flamengo	2017	Série A	0	0	0	0	0	0	0	0	0	0
Flamengo	Total		94	0	17	0	4	0	43	0	158	0
America-RJ (loan)	2008	State	—		—		—		13	0	13	0
America-RJ (loan)	Total		—		—		—		13	0	13	0
Gaziantepspor (loan)	2016–17	Süper Lig	14	0	0	0	—		0	0	14	0
Gaziantepspor (loan)	Total		14	0	0	0	—		0	0	14	0
Grêmio	2017	Série A	10	0	0	0	0	0	0	0	10	0
Grêmio	2018	Série A	20	0	1	0	0	0	3 (Note: Appearance(s) in Campeonato Gaúcho)	0	24	0
Grêmio	2019	Série A	28	0	6	0	12	0	10	0	56	0
Grêmio	2020	Série A	10	0	2	0	0	0	2	0	14	0
Grêmio	2021	Série A	1	0	2	0	0	0	1	0	4	0
Grêmio	Total		69	0	11	0	12	0	16	0	108	0
Marítimo	2021–22	Primeira Liga	30	0	0	0	—		0	0	30	0
Al-Ettifaq	2022–23	SPL	30	0	1	0	—		—		31	0
Al-Ettifaq	2023–24	SPL	34	0	2	0	—		—		36	0
Al-Ettifaq	Total		64	0	3	0	0	0	0	0	67	0
Career total			271	0	31	0	16	0	72	0	390	0

== Honours ==
Flamengo

- Campeonato Brasileiro Série A: 2009
- Copa do Brasil: 2013
- Campeonato Carioca: 2007, 2008, 2009, 2011, 2014

Grêmio

- Copa Libertadores: 2017
- Recopa Sudamericana: 2018
- Campeonato Gaúcho: 2018, 2019, 2020, 2021
- Recopa Gaúcha: 2019, 2021
