= Egídio (footballer) =

Brazilian footballer (born 1986)

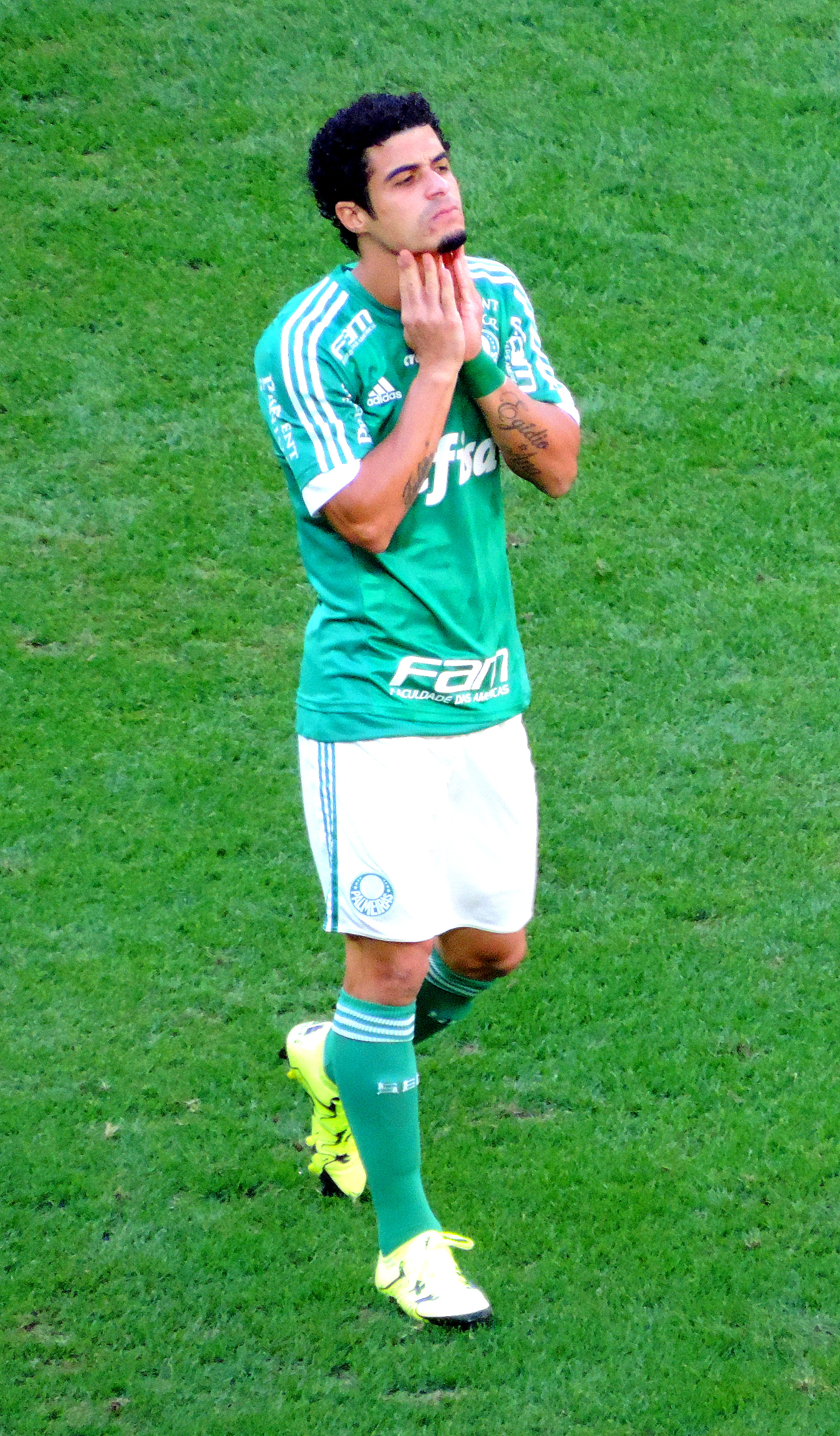

Personal information
- Full name: Egídio de Araújo Pereira Júnior
- Date of birth: 16 June 1986 (age 40)
- Place of birth: Rio de Janeiro, Brazil
- Height: 1.76 m (5 ft 9 in)
- Position: Left back

Youth career
- 2002–2005: Flamengo

Senior career*
Years	Team	Apps	(Gls)
2003–2012	Flamengo	36	(1)
2007	→ Paraná (loan)	16	(1)
2008	→ Juventude (loan)	14	(2)
2009	→ Figueirense (loan)	26	(4)
2010	→ Vitória (loan)	42	(2)
2011	→ Ceará (loan)	11	(1)
2012	→ Goiás (loan)	53	(5)
2013–2014	Cruzeiro	82	(2)
2015	Dnipro	1	(0)
2015–2017	Palmeiras	85	(2)
2018–2019	Cruzeiro	74	(0)
2020–2021	Fluminense	54	(0)
2022	Coritiba	34	(2)
2023	Tombense	29	(1)
- * Club domestic league appearances and goals as of 30 October 2023

Egídio de Araújo Pereira Júnior (born 16 June 1986), simply known as Egídio, is a Brazilian footballer who plays as a left back.

== Club career ==
=== Flamengo and loans ===
Born in Rio de Janeiro, Egídio was a Flamengo youth graduate. He made his first team debut on 19 January 2003 at the age of just 16, coming on as a late substitute for Zé Carlos in a 2–1 Campeonato Carioca home win against Friburguense. He subsequently returned to the youth setup, being definitely promoted to the main squad only in the 2006 season.

Egídio made his Série A debut on 23 July 2006, replacing André Lima in a 3–0 away loss against Santa Cruz. Ahead of the 2007 campaign, he was loaned to fellow top-tier side Paraná; at the club he scored his first senior goal on 18 March 2007, netting his team's second in a 2–2 away draw against Coritiba for the Campeonato Paranaense championship.

In June 2007, Egídio was recalled by Fla, as starter Juan was heavily linked to a move to Espanyol. The move never materialized, and after again being rarely used, he served another loan stints at Juventude, Figueirense and Vitória.

Back to Flamengo for the 2011 season, Egídio was a regular starter during the year's state league. He started the league being a first-choice, scoring once in a 3–3 away draw against Bahia on 29 May, but lost space after the arrival of Júnior César, and was subsequently loaned to fellow league team Ceará on 22 June.

On 4 January 2012, Egídio was presented at Série B side Goiás. He was an undisputed starter for the club, scoring eight times and providing 28 assists as the club achieved promotion to the main category as champions.

=== Cruzeiro ===
On 5 December 2012, Egídio joined Cruzeiro on a permanent deal. A regular starter, he lifted the league trophy twice while also winning the Campeonato Mineiro in 2014.

=== Dnipro ===
On 6 January 2015, Egídio moved abroad for the first time in his career and joined Ukrainian club Dnipro Dnipropetrovsk. He only made his debut for the club on 19 February, in a 2–0 home win against Olympiacos for the UEFA Europa League.

In late March 2015, Egídio terminated his contract with Dnipro after allegedly not having been receiving wages.

=== Palmeiras ===
On 1 April 2015, Egídio was presented at Palmeiras, after agreeing to a contract until the end of 2017. Initially an undisputed starter, he fell down the pecking order in the following years, being constantly criticized by the club's supporters due to his performances.

=== Return to Cruzeiro ===
On 29 November 2017, Egídio returned to former club Cruzeiro after signing a two-year deal. On 28 February 2019, he renewed his contract until the end of 2020, but was a first-choice in the club's first-ever relegation from the top tier, being again subject of criticism by the club's supporters.

== Career statistics ==
As of 5 November 2021

Club	Season	League			State League		Cup		Continental		Other		Total	
Club	Season	Division	Apps	Goals	Apps	Goals	Apps	Goals	Apps	Goals	Apps	Goals	Apps	Goals
Flamengo	2003	Série A	0	0	1	0	0	0	0	0	—		1	0
Flamengo	2005	Série A	0	0	1	0	0	0	—		—		1	0
Flamengo	2006	Série A	1	0	2	0	0	0	—		—		3	0
Flamengo	2007	Série A	6	0	—		—		—		—		6	0
Flamengo	2008	Série A	1	0	5	0	—		0	0	—		6	0
Flamengo	2009	Série A	0	0	5	0	0	0	0	0	—		5	0
Flamengo	2011	Série A	3	1	11	0	3	0	0	0	—		17	1
Flamengo	Subtotal		11	1	25	0	3	0	0	0	—		39	1
Paraná (loan)	2007	Série A	0	0	16	1	—		10 (Note: Appearance(s) in Copa Libertadores)	1	—		26	2
Juventude (loan)	2008	Série B	14	2	—		—		—		—		14	2
Figueirense (loan)	2009	Série B	26	4	—		—		—		—		26	4
Vitória (loan)	2010	Série A	30	1	12	1	10	0	2 (Note: Appearance(s) in Copa Sudamericana)	0	—		54	2
Ceará (loan)	2011	Série A	11	1	—		—		2	0	—		13	1
Goiás (loan)	2012	Série B	33	2	20	3	8	3	—		—		61	8
Cruzeiro	2013	Série A	35	0	10	1	5	1	—		—		50	2
Cruzeiro	2014	Série A	31	1	6	0	5	0	6	0	—		48	1
Cruzeiro	Subtotal		66	1	16	1	10	1	6	0	—		98	3
Dnipro	2014–15	Ukrainian Premier League	1	0	—		—		4 (Note: Appearance(s) in UEFA Europa League)	0	—		5	0
Palmeiras	2015	Série A	30	1	—		6	0	—		—		36	1
Palmeiras	2016	Série A	14	0	11	0	1	0	4	1	—		30	1
Palmeiras	2017	Série A	21	1	9	0	2	0	2	0	—		34	1
Palmeiras	Subtotal		65	2	20	0	9	0	6	0	—		100	3
Cruzeiro	2018	Série A	25	0	12	0	7	0	10	0	—		54	0
Cruzeiro	2019	Série A	25	0	12	1	3	0	7	0	—		47	1
Cruzeiro	Subtotal		50	0	24	1	10	0	17	0	—		101	1
Fluminense	2020	Série A	20	0	11	0	6	0	2	0	—		39	0
Fluminense	2021	Série A	15	0	8	0	5	0	8	1	—		36	1
Fluminense	Subtotal		35	0	19	0	11	0	10	1	—		75	1
Career total			342	14	152	7	61	4	57	2	0	0	612	28

== Honours ==
=== Club ===
Flamengo

- Copa do Brasil: 2006
- Taça Guanabara: 2008, 2011
- Taça Rio: 2009, 2011
- Campeonato Carioca: 2008, 2009, 2011

Vitória

- Campeonato Baiano: 2010

Goiás

- Campeonato Goiano: 2012
- Campeonato Brasileiro Série B: 2012

Cruzeiro

- Campeonato Brasileiro Série A: 2013, 2014
- Campeonato Mineiro: 2014, 2018
- Copa do Brasil: 2018

Palmeiras

- Copa do Brasil: 2015
- Campeonato Brasileiro Série A: 2016

=== Individual ===
- Campeonato Brasileiro Série A Team of the Year: 2014
