= Marcelo Lomba =

Brazilian footballer (born 1986)

- Lomba with Palmeiras in 2025

Personal information
- Full name: Marcelo Lomba do Nascimento
- Date of birth: 18 December 1986 (age 39)
- Place of birth: Rio de Janeiro, Brazil
- Height: 1.89 m (6 ft 2 in)
- Position: Goalkeeper

Team information
- Current team: Palmeiras
- Number: 14

Youth career
- 2000: CFZ
- 2001–2006: Flamengo

Senior career*
Years	Team	Apps	(Gls)
2006–2012	Flamengo	32	(0)
2011–2012	→ Bahia (loan)	51	(0)
2012–2016	Bahia	154	(0)
2015	→ Ponte Preta (loan)	38	(0)
2016–2021	Internacional	160	(0)
2022–	Palmeiras	24	(0)

International career
2003	Brazil U17		
- * Club domestic league appearances and goals as of 7 April 2026

Marcelo Lomba do Nascimento (born 18 December 1986), is a Brazilian footballer who plays as a goalkeeper for Série A club Palmeiras.

== Career ==
=== Flamengo ===
In 2006, Lomba had his first chance in the professional team, but only in 2008, in a Campeonato Carioca derby match against Vasco da Gama on April 6, 2008, he had played his first official match for the club, the match ended in a 2–2 draw. Despite this first chance, Lomba didn't have much space as he was, at that time, the squad's third goalkeeper after Diego and Bruno.

In 2010, with the departure of Diego for Ceará, the young archer became the team's second keeper, and gradually established himself as a starter after Bruno had left the club due to criminal issues.

For the 2011 season Flamengo loaned Lomba to Brazilian Série B club Ponte Preta to get more first team experience. But due to contractual problems, he couldn't be loaned and returned to Flamengo.

==== Bahia (loan) ====
After few more months training with Flamengo, Lomba has been loaned to Bahia until May 2012.

=== Internacional ===
Internacional acquired Lomba from Bahia on 15 July 2016, for a fee of R$2 million. Lomba became the number one choice on Inter's goal in 2018 after Danilo Fernandes' injuries. He was subsequently named best goalkeeper of the 2018 Campeonato Brasileiro, helping the club achieve a 3rd place, securing a spot on the next season's Copa Libertadores.

=== Palmeiras ===
In December 2021, Lomba signed a one-year contract with Palmeiras.

== Career statistics ==
As of 1 October 2023

Club	Season	League			State League		Cup		Continental		Other		Total	
Club	Season	Division	Apps	Goals	Apps	Goals	Apps	Goals	Apps	Goals	Apps	Goals	Apps	Goals
Flamengo	2006	Série A	0	0	0	0	0	0	—		—		0	0
Flamengo	2007	Série A	0	0	0	0	—		0	0	—		0	0
Flamengo	2008	Série A	0	0	1 (Note: Appearance(s) in Campeonato Carioca)	0	—		0	0	—		1	0
Flamengo	2009	Série A	0	0	0	0	0	0	0	0	—		0	0
Flamengo	2010	Série A	30	0	1	0	—		1 (Note: Appearance(s) in Copa Libertadores)	0	—		32	0
Flamengo	Total		30	0	2	0	0	0	1	0	—		33	0
Bahia (loan)	2011	Série A	33	0	0	0	0	0	0	0	—		33	0
Bahia (loan)	2012	Série A	2	0	16 (Note: Appearance(s) in Campeonato Baiano)	0	6	0	—		—		24	0
Bahia	2012	Série A	34	0	0	0	0	0	2 (Note: Appearance(s) in Copa Sudamericana)	0	—		36	0
Bahia	2013	Série A	37	0	9	0	0	0	4	0	6 (Note: Appearance(s) in Copa do Nordeste)	0	56	0
Bahia	2014	Série A	37	0	12	0	6	0	4	0	6	0	65	0
Bahia	2016	Série B	13	0	12	0	4	0	—		8	0	37	0
Bahia	Total		156	0	49	0	16	0	10	0	20	0	251	0
Ponte Preta (loan)	2015	Série A	37	0	1 (Note: Appearance(s) in Campeonato Paulista)	0	3	0	2	0	—		43	0
Internacional	2016	Série A	6	0	—		—		—		—		6	0
Internacional	2017	Série B	0	0	5 (Note: Appearance(s) in Campeonato Gaúcho)	0	3	0	—		2 (Note: Appearance(s) in Primeira Liga)	0	10	0
Internacional	2018	Série A	24	0	8	0	5	0	—		—		37	0
Internacional	2019	Série A	34	0	14	0	8	0	10	0	—		66	0
Internacional	2020	Série A	37	0	11	0	4	0	12	0	—		64	0
Internacional	2021	Série A	15	0	8	0	0	0	6	0	—		31	0
Internacional	Total		116	0	46	0	20	0	28	0	2	0	209	0
Palmeiras	2022	Série A	3	0	7	0	0	0	0	0	0	0	10	0
Palmeiras	2023	Série A	3	0	1	0	2	0	1	0	0	0	7	0
Palmeiras	Total		6	0	8	0	2	0	1	0	0	0	17	0
Career total			325	0	116	0	41	0	41	0	22	0	536	0

== Honours ==
=== Clubs ===
Flamengo

- Copa do Brasil: 2006
- Campeonato Carioca: 2007, 2008, 2009, 2011
- Campeonato Brasileiro Série A: 2009

Bahia

- Campeonato Baiano: 2012, 2014

Palmeiras

- Campeonato Brasileiro Série A: 2022, 2023
- Recopa Sudamericana: 2022
- Campeonato Paulista: 2022, 2023, 2024, 2026
- Supercopa do Brasil: 2023
- FIFA Club World Cup Runner Up: 2021

=== National team ===
- FIFA U-17 World Championship: 2003

=== Individual ===
- Campeonato Brasileiro Série A Team of the Year: 2018
