= Léo Moura =

Brazilian footballer (born 1978)

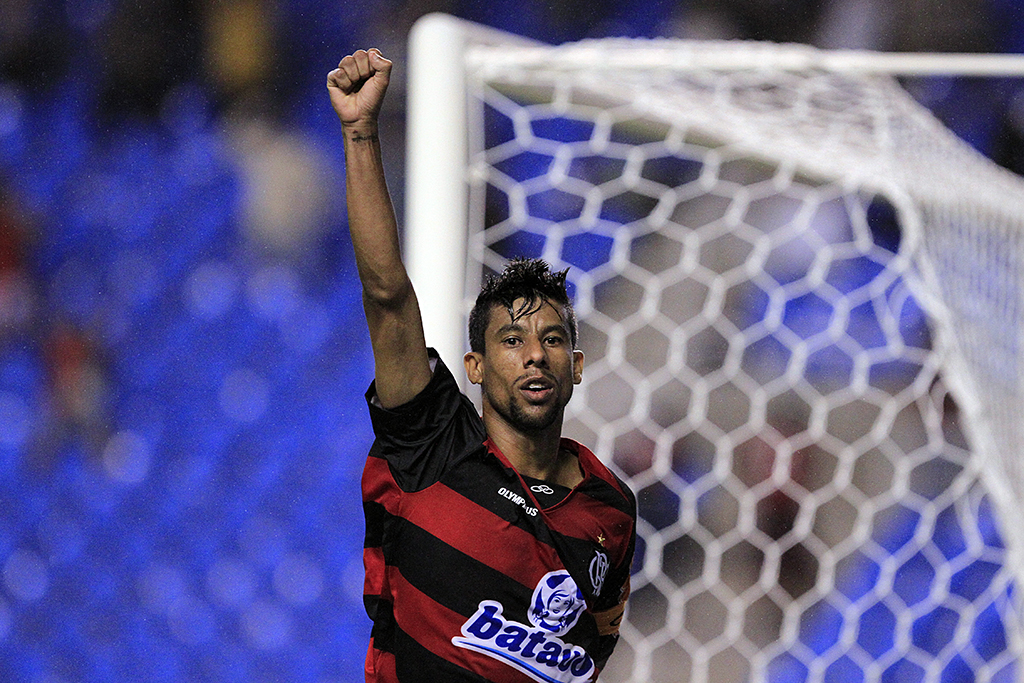
- Moura celebrates after scoring for Flamengo in 2010

Personal information
- Full name: Leonardo da Silva Moura
- Date of birth: 23 October 1978 (age 48)
- Place of birth: Niterói, Brazil
- Height: 1.76 m (5 ft 9 in)
- Position: Right-back

Youth career
- Botafogo

Senior career*
Years	Team	Apps	(Gls)
1997–1999	Botafogo		
1999	Linhares		
1999–2000	Germinal Beerschot	33	(16)
2000–2001	ADO Den Haag	29	(12)
2001	Botafogo	24	(1)
2002	Vasco da Gama	0	(0)
2002	Palmeiras	9	(0)
2003	São Paulo	22	(0)
2004	Fluminense	41	(0)
2005	Sporting Braga	8	(0)
2005–2015	Flamengo	314	(27)
2015	Fort Lauderdale Strikers	9	(2)
2015	FC Goa	16	(2)
2016	Metropolitano	0	(0)
2016	Santa Cruz	33	(3)
2017–2020	Grêmio	54	(3)
2020	Botafogo-PB	5	(0)
Total		597	(62)

International career
2008	Brazil	1	(0)
- * Club domestic league appearances and goals

Leonardo "Léo" da Silva Moura (born 23 October 1978) is a Brazilian former professional footballer who played for several clubs, including Fluminense, Flamengo and Grêmio. Mainly a right-back, he also played as a midfielder.

Léo Moura previously played for Flamengo, for over ten years, where he was the team's captain, and Grêmio with whom he won his biggest title, the 2017 Copa Libertadores. He is one of the few players who represented all four of the big Rio de Janeiro teams, Botafogo, Vasco da Gama, Fluminense, and Flamengo.

== Club career ==
=== Early career ===
Léo Moura begun his footballing career at the youth division of Linhares, acting as a midfielder. Still at the youth level, he was transferred to the Rio club Botafogo. Making his professional debut for the Botafogo team in 1998, Moura has transferred to Belgian side Germinal Beerschot where he played for one season. Afterwards, he has transferred to ADO Den Haag, then at the Dutch second division, Eerste Divisie, where he adapted to play as a right back and had a remarkable season.

=== Return to Brazil ===
On the second semester of 2001, he returned to Brazil and to Botafogo. Once there, Leo Moura sought a position as a midfielder, but lost it due to being sidelined by an injury. After his recovery, Leonardo switched to the role of right back, which suited him well and solved his club's lack of players for that role since César Prates's departure in 1999. However, Leo Moura surprisingly left Botafogo, moving to Vasco da Gama.

At Vasco, Leo Moura showed good chemistry with Romário and Euller, the attacking duo for the club. In spite of his success, Leo Moura decided to move to Palmeiras in 2002, a move which he regretted, as he was part of the Palmeiras squad that was relegated to the Campeonato Brasileiro Série B.

In 2003, he joined São Paulo, and due to the presence of another full back named Leonardo on the squad, Leonardo adopted the name of Leonardo Moura. After poor showings for the club, Leo returned to Rio de Janeiro, this time to defend Fluminense.

At Fluminense, he showed great potential and became a crowd favorite, once again playing with Romário, and playing by the side of his future teammate at Flamengo Júnior César. However, Léo Moura departed the club for Portugal's Sporting Braga in 2005, where he briefly stayed.

=== Flamengo ===
Joining Flamengo in 2005, Léo Moura arrived with certain suspicion from the fans, as he was known as a "nomadic player" who played for all of Flamengo's major rivals before. However, Léo soon made its mark for the Gávea club, being an important part of the squad and helping it avoid relegation. A skilled passer and dribbler, Leo Moura cemented his status as a key player for the Rio Club.

Moura's first career title was won at the 2006 Copa do Brasil. With this victory, Flamengo earned a place at the 2007 Copa Libertadores after a four-year-long absence. Moura formed a competent full back duo with Juan, a partnership which would last until Juan's departure from the club in 2010. Alongside midfielder Renato Abreu and the goalkeeper Bruno, Moura was received as one of the highlights of the squad.

In spite of a poor showing at the 2007 Copa Libertadores, Leo Moura had a good year in 2007, winning the Campeonato Carioca and being chosen by Placar magazine as the best right back of the season, winning the Bola de Prata award.

In 2008, after extending his contract with Flamengo, Leo Moura was called up to defend the Brazil national team in a friendly against Ireland. Moura was part of the squad which won the Taça Guanabara and the Campeonato Carioca, and was once again the winner of the Bola de Prata.

2009 proved to be a very successful year for the right back and a very memorable year for the rubro-negro team, as Flamengo went on to win its sixth Campeonato Brasileiro title. Leo Moura was an instrumental player for Flamengo's third consecutive Campeonato Carioca win, a feat that Flamengo has repeated six times in its history. 2010, however, proved to be a more tumultuous year for the club. Leonardo Moura earned his place as captain of the team after the club's captain, Bruno, was suspected of murder. Flamengo flirted with relegation throughout the year, staying dangerously close to the relegation zone in the league table, but it eventually reached the Copa Sudamericana qualifying zone by the final round.

Leo Moura's time for the Rio club seemed to be at an end in 2011, as he was hinted to join SC Internacional. The departure of his long-time partner at Flamengo's defense, Juan, reinforced the club's need for Moura to be on its team. Nonetheless, his time as the captain came to an end as the 2002 FIFA World Cup and 2005 Ballon d'Or winner and Brazilian international Ronaldinho joined the club, earning the club captaincy. Winning the 2011 state league title after winning both rounds of the competition, the Taça Guanabara and the Taça Rio, the Flamengo squad had great success at the first semester of the year, being a favorite to win the 2011 season of the Brazilian league. Flamengo mounted an impressive undefeated streak throughout the year, which was broken by Ceará SC in the Copa do Brasil quarter finals, and stayed unbeaten in the league season for 16 rounds, losing against Goiânia club Atlético Goianiense in the 17th round, on a match Moura played as a midfielder. However, Flamengo did not follow up in the second semester, barely earning a place at the next year's Libertadores by the end of the season.

Leonardo Moura's last game at Flamengo was on 4 March 2015, when he played a testimonial match against Nacional at the Maracanã, the right-back made one of the assists as Flamengo beat the Uruguayan side 2–0.

=== FC Goa ===
In 2015, he signed for FC Goa, who at the time were under head coach Zico. He scored 2 goals and had 8 assists and was a crowd favourite. He helped his team to the finals of ISL and was one of the most valuable assets of the club. In the final, against Chennaiyin, he was injured and couldn't help his team win the 2015 Indian Super League.

=== Metropolitano ===
On 2 February 2016, Moura was announced by Metropolitano, from Santa Catarina, as their new player. He comes to club for playing League of Santa Catarina.

=== Santa Cruz, Grêmio and Botafogo of Paraíba ===
In second semester, Moura was appointed by Santa Cruz. In 2017, Moura was contracted by Grêmio. In both teams won many titles. In 2020, at 41 years old, he signed with Botafogo-PB.

== International career ==
Leonardo debuted for the Brazil national team in a friendly match played in Dublin against Ireland on 6 February 2008, which they won by 1–0.

== Career statistics ==
Appearances and goals by club, season and competition
Club	Season	League			Cup		Continental (Note: Copa Libertadores, Copa Sudamericana, and Recopa Sudamericana.)		Other		Total	
Club	Season	Division	Apps	Goals	Apps	Goals	Apps	Goals	Apps	Goals	Apps	Goals
Germinal Beerschot	1999–2000	Belgian Pro League	33	16							33	16
ADO Den Haag	2000–01	Eerste Divisie	29	12							29	12
Botafogo	2001	Série A	24	1							24	1
Vasco da Gama	2002	Série A			8	1					8	1
Palmeiras	2002	Série A	9	0							9	0
São Paulo	2003	Série A	22	0	4	0					26	0
Fluminense	2004	Série A	41	0	4	1					45	1
Sporting Braga	2004–05	Primeira Liga	8	0							8	0
Flamengo	2005	Série A	32	5							32	5
Flamengo	2006	Série A	27	1	10	1			9	0	46	2
Flamengo	2007	Série A	35	5			8	0	12	0	55	5
Flamengo	2008	Série A	35	8			7	1	14	4	56	13
Flamengo	2009	Série A	32	4	5	1	0	0	17	2	54	7
Flamengo	2010	Série A	35	1			10	2	13	1	58	4
Flamengo	2011	Série A	35	0	4	0	2	0	17	1	58	1
Flamengo	2012	Série A	24	0			7	2	9	1	39	3
Flamengo	2013	Série A	26	2	11	1			13	0	50	3
Flamengo	2014	Série A	33	1	4	0	4	0	9	0	50	1
Flamengo	2015	Série A							3	0	3	0
Flamengo	Total		314	27	34	3	38	5	116	9	502	44
Fort Lauderdale Strikers	2015	NASL	9	2	1	0					10	2
FC Goa	2015	ISL	16	2							16	2
Metropolitano	2016	Catarinense							6	0	6	0
Santa Cruz	2016	Série A	33	3	2	0	3	0	4	0	42	3
Grêmio	2017	Série A	17	0	2	0	10	1	12	2	41	3
Grêmio	2018	Série A	18	0	2	0	8	0	7	1	35	1
Grêmio	2019	Série A	19	0	1	0	0	0	3	0	23	0
Grêmio	Total		54	3	5	0	18	1	22	3	99	7
Botafogo-PB	2020	Série C	5	0	2	0			3	0	10	0
Career total			597	62	60	5	59	6	151	12	867	85

== Honours ==
Flamengo

- Campeonato Brasileiro Série A: 2009
- Copa do Brasil: 2006, 2013
- Campeonato Carioca: 2007, 2008, 2009, 2011, 2014

Santa Cruz

- Copa do Nordeste: 2016
- Campeonato Pernambucano: 2016

Grêmio

- Copa Libertadores: 2017
- Recopa Sudamericana: 2018
- Campeonato Gaúcho: 2018, 2019

Individual

- Campeonato Brasileiro Série A Team of the Year: 2007, 2008
