= Everton Silva =

Brazilian footballer (born 1988)

Personal information
- Full name: Everton José Modesto Silva
- Date of birth: 4 August 1988 (age 38)
- Place of birth: Rio de Janeiro, Brazil
- Height: 1.71 m (5 ft 7 in)
- Position: Right back

Team information
- Current team: CSA

Youth career
- 2005–2007: Friburguense

Senior career*
Years	Team	Apps	(Gls)
2007–2009	Friburguense	1	(1)
2007	→ Guanabara (loan)	0	(0)
2008	→ Angra dos Reis (loan)	0	(0)
2009	→ Flamengo (loan)	28	(1)
2010–2013	Flamengo	11	(0)
2010	→ Ponte Preta (loan)	8	(0)
2011	→ Boavista (loan)	9	(0)
2011	→ Duque de Caxias (loan)	27	(1)
2012	→ Atlético Goianiense (loan)	4	(0)
2012	→ CRB (loan)	0	(0)
2012	→ ABC (loan)	0	(0)
2013	→ Boavista (loan)	10	(0)
2014	Chapecoense	4	(0)
2014	Paysandu	7	(0)
2015–2016	Red Bull Brasil	27	(0)
2015–2016	→ Avaí (loan)	16	(1)
2016	→ Joinville (loan)	25	(0)
2017	Ceará	7	(0)
2017–2018	Red Bull Brasil	13	(0)
2018–2019	São Bento	20	(0)
2019–2020	Boavista	10	(0)
2020	→ Coimbra (loan)	2	(0)
2020	→ América-RN (loan)	18	(0)
2021	América-RN	16	(0)
2021	CSA	19	(0)
2022	Confiança-SE	10	(0)
2022–	CSA	22	(0)
- * Club domestic league appearances and goals as of 26 August 2023

Everton José Modesto Silva (born 4 August 1988), known as Everton Silva, is a Brazilian footballer who plays as a right back for CSA.

== Career ==
Born in Rio de Janeiro, Everton signed with Flamengo in the beginning of 2009 to act as a cover-up member of the club's first team. His debut for his new club was in a 2–2 draw against Boavista on the 2009 Rio de Janeiro State League.

After a good 2009 season as Leonardo Moura substitute Flamengo announced that with investors' help Everton would stay in the club in 2010.

== Honours ==
Flamengo

- Série A: 2009
- Campeonato Carioca: 2009
