= Diego Costa (disambiguation) =

Diego Costa (Diego da Silva Costa, born 1988) is a professional footballer.

Diego Costa may also refer to:

- Diego (footballer, born 1979) (Diego Costa Silva), Brazilian footballer
- Diego (footballer, born 1982) (Diego Salgado Costa de Menezes), Brazilian footballer
- Diego Costa (footballer, born 1999) (Diego Henrique Costa Barbosa), Brazilian footballer

== See also ==
- Diogo Costa (born 1999), Portuguese footballer
- Diogo Costa (sailor) (born 1997), Portuguese sailor
