= Zé Roberto (footballer, born 1980) =

Brazilian footballer

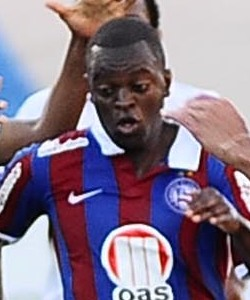

Personal information
- Full name: José Roberto de Oliveira
- Date of birth: 9 December 1980 (age 45)
- Place of birth: Itumbiara, Goiás, Brazil
- Height: 1.70 m (5 ft 7 in)
- Position: Attacking midfielder

Team information
- Current team: Botafogo (SP)

Youth career
- 1996–1997: Coritiba

Senior career*
Years	Team	Apps	(Gls)
1998	Mirassol	–	(–)
1999	Juventus	–	(–)
2000	Cruzeiro	3	(0)
2001	Benfica B	11	(1)
2001	Portuguesa	–	(–)
2002–2003	Vitória	42	(9)
2004	Kashiwa Reysol	18	(1)
2005	Vitória	4	(1)
2005–2008	Botafogo	71	(14)
2008–2010	Schalke 04	3	(1)
2009	→ Flamengo (loan)	25	(5)
2010	Vasco da Gama	24	(5)
2011	Internacional	15	(2)
2012–2013	Bahia	26	(0)
2013	Figueirense		(0)
2014	Brasiliense		(0)
2015–	Botafogo (SP)		(0)
- * Club domestic league appearances and goals as of 13 January 2014

José Roberto de Oliveira, or simply Zé Roberto (born 9 December 1980), is a Brazilian former association footballer who played as an attacking midfielder.

== Career ==
Zé Roberto was born in Itumbiara.

His representatives agreed to a €3 million fee with both Botafogo and FC Schalke 04 in August 2007. In January 2008 they finalised the deal and Zé Roberto joined the German side. He made his debut for Schalke 04 on 3 February 2008 scoring a goal in the 90th minute, only 33 seconds after being substituted on. On 12 December 2008, he was loaned out to Flamengo to the end of the season. On 21 October 2009, he announced his wish to stay with Flamengo after the end of his loan contract.

=== Flamengo ===
Zé Roberto made his first match for Flamengo on 4 February 2009, playing against Mesquita. After only six minutes of playing, he scored his first goal for his new club. He played 72 minutes and Flamengo won 4–1 at Maracanã Stadium.

=== Vasco da Gama ===
Zé Roberto moved to Vasco da Gama in May 2010 (effective in August), signed a contract until July 2011.

== Club statistics ==
Club performance			League	
Season	Club	League	Apps	Goals
Brazil			League	
2000	Cruzeiro	Série A	3	0
2001	Portuguesa Desportos	Série A	0	0
2002	Vitória	Série A	8	3
2003	Vitória	Série A	36	6
Japan			League	
2004	Kashiwa Reysol	J1 League	18	1
Brazil			League	
2005	Vitória	Série B	0	0
2005	Botafogo	Série A	17	3
2006	Botafogo	Série A	30	9
2007	Botafogo	Série A	24	2
Germany			League	
2007/08	Schalke	Bundesliga	3	1
2008/09	Schalke	Bundesliga	0	0
Brazil			League	
2009	Flamengo	Série A	25	5
Germany			League	
2009/10	Schalke	Bundesliga		
Country	Brazil		143	27
Country	Japan		18	1
Country	Germany		3	1
Total			164	29

=== Flamengo career statistics ===
(Correct as of 6 December 2009)

Club	Season	Carioca League			Brazilian Série A			Brazilian Cup			Copa Libertadores			Copa Sudamericana			Total		
Club	Season	Apps	Goals	Assists	Apps	Goals	Assists	Apps	Goals	Assists	Apps	Goals	Assists	Apps	Goals	Assists	Apps	Goals	Assists
Flamengo	2009	14	3	4	25	5	2	4	2	0	-	-	-	1	0	0	44	10	6

according to combined sources on the.

== Honours ==
=== Club ===
Botafogo

- Rio de Janeiro State League: 2006

Flamengo

- Rio de Janeiro State League: 2009
- Brazilian Série A: 2009

Internacional

- Rio Grande do Sul State League: 2011

Bahia

- Bahia State League: 2012

=== Individual ===
- Campeonato Brasileiro Série A Team of the Year: 2006
- Bola de Prata: 2006
