= Rodrigo Heffner =

Brazilian footballer (born 1982)

Personal information
- Full name: Rodrigo Vieira Heffner
- Date of birth: September 8, 1982 (age 44)
- Place of birth: Porto Alegre, Brazil
- Height: 1.75 m (5 ft 9 in)
- Position: Right-back

Team information
- Current team: Santo André

Youth career
- Grêmio

Senior career*
Years	Team	Apps	(Gls)
2001–2002	Grêmio		
2002–2003	Suzano		
2003–2004	ADAP		
2005	Cianorte		
2005–2006	Barueri		
2006	Mogi Mirim		
2007	América		
2007	Roma Apucarana		
2007–2008	Santa Cruz-RS		
2008–2010	Coritiba	19	(0)
2010	Guarani	27	(0)
2011	Naútico	2	(0)
2011	→ Caxias (loan)	4	(0)
2012	América-MG	8	(0)
2013–	Santo André		
- * Club domestic league appearances and goals as of April 17, 2013

Rodrigo Vieira Heffner (born September 8, 1982), known as Rodrigo Heffner, is a Brazilian footballer who plays as a right-back for Santo André.

== Career ==
Rodrigo Heffner was born in Porto Alegre. He signed a contract until the end of the 2011 season with Naútico.

== Career statistics ==
(Correct as of October 16, 2010)

Club	Season	State League		Brazilian Série A		Copa do Brasil		Copa Libertadores		Copa Sudamericana		Total	
Club	Season	Apps	Goals	Apps	Goals	Apps	Goals	Apps	Goals	Apps	Goals	Apps	Goals
Coritiba	2008	-	-	?	?	-	-	-	-	-	-	?	?
Coritiba	2009	?	?	19	0	-	-	-	-	-	-	?	?
Coritiba	2010	?	?	-	-	3	0	-	-	-	-	?	?
Guarani	2010	-	-	27	0	-	-	-	-	-	-	27	0
Total		?	?	?	?	?	?	-	-	-	-	?	?

== Honours ==
Grêmio

- Campeonato Gaúcho: 2001

Suzano

- Campeonato Paulista Série A2: 2003

Barueri

- Campeonato Paulista Série A3: 2005

Coritiba

- Campeonato Paranaense: 2010
