= Bruno (footballer, born 1984) =

Brazilian footballer and convicted murderer (born 1984)

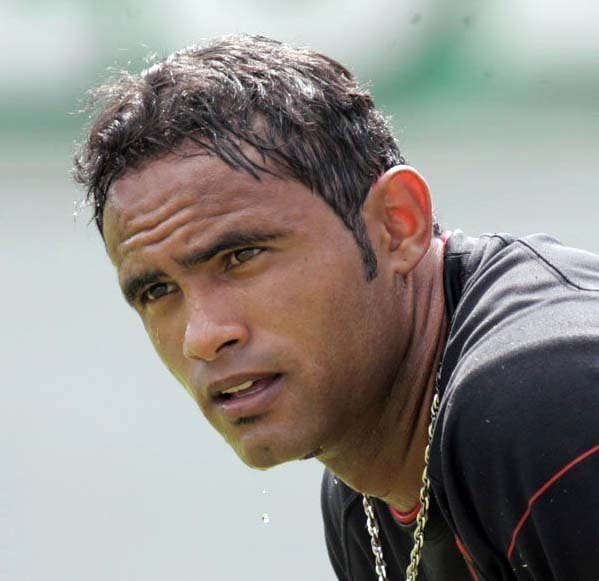
- Bruno in 2008
- Born: Bruno Fernandes das Dores de Souza; 23 December 1984 (age 41); Ribeirão das Neves, Minas Gerais, Brazil
- Occupation: Footballer
- Height: 1.90 m (6 ft 3 in)
- Status: Released on licence
- Criminal charges: Murder; kidnapping; hiding a body; conspiracy; corruption of minors
- Penalty: 22 years' imprisonment
Association football career
- Position: Goalkeeper
Youth career
- 2001: Tombense
- 2002–2004: Atlético Mineiro
Senior career*
| Years | Team | Apps | (Gls) |
| 2002–2006 | Atlético Mineiro | 59 | (0) |
| 2006–2007 | Corinthians | 0 | (0) |
| 2006–2007 | → Flamengo (loan) | 53 | (0) |
| 2008–2010 | Flamengo | 81 | (2) |
| 2014–2017 | Montes Claros | 0 | (0) |
| 2017 | Boa Esporte | 0 | (0) |
| 2019 | Poços de Caldas | 0 | (0) |
| 2020 | Rio Branco-AC | 18 | (1) |
| 2021–2022 | Atlético Carioca | 5 | (1) |
| 2022 | Búzios | 1 | (0) |
| 2023 | Atlético Carioca | 9 | (1) |
| 2026 | Capixaba SC | 3 | (0) |
| 2026 | Vasco-AC | 0 | (0) |
- * Club domestic league appearances and goals

Bruno Fernandes das Dores de Souza (Brazilian Portuguese pronunciation: [ˈbɾunu feʁˈnɐ̃dʒis dɐz ˈdoɾiz dʒi ˈsowzɐ], born 23 December 1984), commonly known in Brazil as Goleiro Bruno (Brazilian Portuguese pronunciation: [ɡoˈlejɾu ˈbɾunu], Goalkeeper Bruno) and sometimes as Bruno Fernandes (not to be confused with the Portuguese midfielder Bruno Fernandes), (Brazilian Portuguese pronunciation: [ˈbɾunu feʁˈnɐ̃dʒis]), is a Brazilian convicted murderer who plays as a goalkeeper. His last professional club was Vasco-AC, where he played the 2026 Copa do Brasil first round against Velo Clube.

Between 2007 and 2009, Bruno was a key player for Rio de Janeiro giants Flamengo. In 2010, he was charged with the assault, torture and murder of his extramarital girlfriend and mother of his youngest child, Eliza Samudio. In 2013, he was found guilty of ordering Samudio's murder, hiding the body and kidnapping his baby son, and was sentenced to 22 years in prison, but was released pending appeal in February 2017. In April 2017, Brazil's Supreme Court ordered his re-arrest. In July 2019, he was released to serve a partial house arrest, being able to work or train during the day while having to return to his house for the night. He has subsequently joined three football clubs: Poços de Caldas in 2019, Rio Branco-AC in 2020 and Atlético Carioca in 2021. In January 2023, he was released on licence.

== Club career ==
=== Corinthians ===
In 2006, Bruno was signed by investment fund Media Sports Investments, who has been linked to various transactions with his hometown club Atlético Mineiro; the deal was speculated to have been worth around €2 million plus 15% on a future deal. He went on to join Corinthians, then a partner of MSI, but quickly became unsatisfied as manager Émerson Leão continuously picked Silvio Luiz and Marcelo over him. The Timão accepted his request for a loan to Flamengo afterwards.

=== Flamengo ===
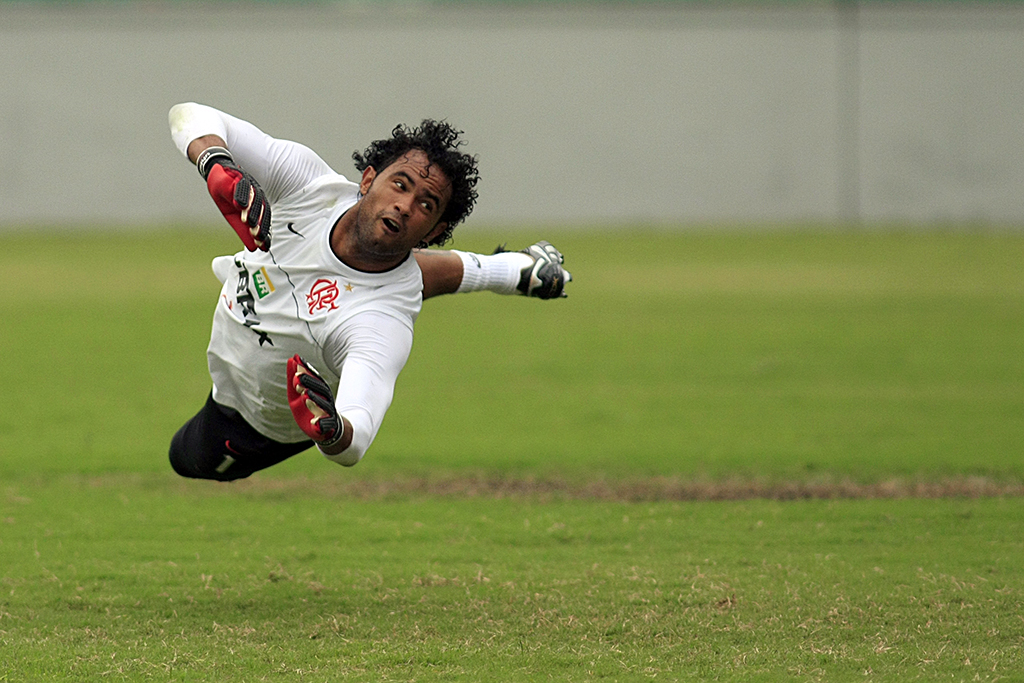
Bruno with Flamengo in 2008

Bruno arrived in the same week that incumbent first choice Diego suffered an injury and quickly became a fan-favourite for his impressive showings, especially when he made three penalty saves to win Flamengo the Campeonato Carioca over Botafogo. Throughout the year, it was speculated that Bruno would depart for Europe, with MSI wishing to cash in on him and rumours of a move to Barcelona surfacing.

For around €3 million, Flamengo sealed a permanent deal with Bruno in 2008, with the player stating his desire to be with the rubro-negro for the foreseeable future. Bruno scored his first professional goal on 23 April 2008, from a free kick, which led the way for a crucial 2–0 victory over Coronel Bolognesi in the Copa Libertadores. Bruno scored his second goal, a penalty against Coritiba, on 23 October 2008. He scored his third goal for Flamengo on 4 February 2009 against Mesquita from a free kick.

After the retirement of Fábio Luciano in May 2009, Bruno became captain. On 12 July 2009, he played his 100th match for Flamengo in the Brazilian Série A, a 2–2 draw with São Paulo. Bruno then made a tribute to Zé Carlos, who died that same month, by wearing the ex-Flamengo goalkeeper's name on the back of his shirt for the remainder of the 2009 season.

His fourth career goal, this time from a free kick, was for Flamengo on 26 May 2010, in a Campeonato Brasileiro match which they lost 2–1 to Fluminense.

In July 2010, Flamengo announced the club had suspended Bruno's contract as a result of the murder investigation, and the club's lawyer would no longer act in his defence.

=== Montes Claros ===
In February 2014, Bruno signed for Montes Claros of the Campeonato Mineiro Módulo II in his home state. Club president Ville Mocelin said "Every human being has the right to a second chance. Montes Claros' thought is to give an opportunity to Bruno to recover for football and society". Having been denied work release by the Court of Justice of the State of Minas Gerais, he never played for the club. By the time of his release in March 2017, he was still under two more years of contract at the club, who had withdrawn from all competitions and only owned one other player.

=== Boa Esporte ===
On 10 March 2017, shortly after leaving prison pending appeal, he signed for Boa Esporte a contract until 2019 and appeared five times before returning to prison. As a result, three sponsors of the club, CardioCenter, Nutrends Nutrition and Magsul, ended their partnerships with the club.

=== Pocos de Caldas ===
In October 2019, Bruno returned to football with the Pocos de Caldas club, playing in a friendly match against Independiente Juruaia; he declared that when "people here in Pocos de Caldas get to know the real Bruno, the human being that he is, then a lot of minds will be changed".

=== Rio Branco ===
In July 2020, Rio Branco Football Club announced that they had signed Bruno, prompting their club's women's team coach to quit in protest. Bruno played for Rio Branco in the Campeonato Brasileiro Série D.

=== Atlético Carioca ===
Atlético Carioca tried to sign Bruno, initially giving up in March 2021. In May 2021, Bruno announced his decision to retire from football to become an investor; however, within two weeks, he announced that he had signed with Atlético Carioca. Bruno made a total of 14 appearances and scored two goals for the club, playing in the lower divisions of the Campeonato Carioca. He also had a spell at SE Búzios in 2022.

=== SC Capixaba ===
After retiring in 2023, Bruno was announced as a new signing for SC Capixaba for the 2026 season. He was dismissed in January after complaining of delayed wages and poor facilities, which the club denied.

=== Vasco-AC ===
On February 18, Bruno was announced by Vasco-AC as a reinforcement for the 2026 Copa do Brasil.

== Murder, arrest and imprisonment ==
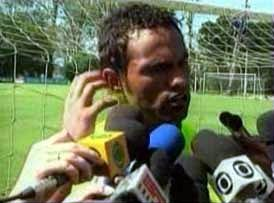
Bruno being interviewed in July 2010

On 9 June 2010, Bruno's girlfriend, actress and model Eliza Samudio, disappeared. While pregnant, Samudio had claimed that Bruno was her child's father, which she could prove after her son was born. When he refused to support the child, Samudio sued Bruno when he was negotiating a lucrative transfer to AC Milan. After Samudio's disappearance, her child turned up with Bruno's wife. In July 2010, a Brazilian judge ordered Bruno's arrest. A 17-year old cousin of Bruno told police that he had taken part in Samudio's abduction with his friend, Luiz Henrique Ferreira Romão. He also stated that Samudio was dead but did not say how she died, nor where her body was, and that Bruno was the father of her baby, despite him already being married. Flamengo suspended his contract with the club, and their lawyers eventually did not represent him in court anymore. According to his accomplice Romão, Bruno tried to commit suicide twice, while in prison waiting for his trial to begin, but the Secretariat of Rio de Janeiro denied that Bruno had done so; it did report that he fainted once, due to low blood sugar levels.

In late July, he was formally charged with murder, kidnapping, hiding a body, forming a criminal gang (conspiracy) and corrupting minors. According to police, Bruno's teenage cousin stated that Samudio's body was cut up and some parts were fed to dogs, while other parts were buried under concrete. Bruno confessed to organizing the plot.

The case has led to debate in Brazil concerning misbehavior by professional athletes and growing crime against women. On 8 March 2013, he was sentenced to a 22-year jail term for the assault, torture and murder of his former girlfriend and mother of his youngest child.

=== Release and re-arrest ===
In February 2017, after Bruno had served six years and seven months in prison, his lawyers filed a petition of habeas corpus because of the slow processing of an appeal request. The petition was granted by the minister of the STF Marco Aurélio Mello and Bruno was released from jail pending an appeal. After his release, Bruno immediately received a number of contract offers and he accepted that from Boa Esporte Clube. Samudio's mother's suit demanding Bruno's return to prison because he posed a threat to her grandson was unsuccessful. In a media interview, Bruno said:

What happened had happened. I made a mistake, a serious one, but mistakes happen in life. [...] I'm not a bad guy. People tried to bury my dreams because of one mistake, yet I asked God for forgiveness so I'm carrying on with my career, dude.

In April 2017, Brazil's supreme court ordered his re-arrest because the defence's legal team themselves were partly to blame for the delays in his appeal, and Bruno was imprisoned again.

=== Partial house arrest ===
In July 2019, Bruno was released from prison to serve in a "semi-open" program for the rest of his sentence, where he could work or train in the day, while being under house arrest at night. The program was intended to have him return to jail each night, but Varginha Prison's inadequate facilities to accommodate the coming and going of detainees led to Bruno enjoying house arrest instead. In January 2023, a judge in the state of Rio de Janeiro granted Bruno release on licence.

== Personal life ==
Bruno's son with Eliza Samudio, Bruno Samudio de Souza (or Bruninho), is also a goalkeeper who currently plays for Botafogo's youth team and has represented Brazil at youth level.

== Career statistics ==
=== Club ===
Appearances and goals by club, season and competition
| Club | Season | League | | | National Cup | | Continental | | Other | | Total | |
| Club | Season | Division | Apps | Goals | Apps | Goals | Apps | Goals | Apps | Goals | Apps | Goals |
|---|---|---|---|---|---|---|---|---|---|---|---|---|
| Atlético Mineiro | 2005 | Série A | 24 | 0 | — | | — | | — | | 24 | 0 |
| Atlético Mineiro | 2006 | Série A | 0 | 0 | 2 | 0 | — | | 3 | 0 | 5 | 0 |
| Atlético Mineiro | Total | | 24 | 0 | 2 | 0 | — | | 3 | 0 | 29 | 0 |
| Flamengo | 2006 | Série A | 17 | 0 | — | | — | | — | | 17 | 0 |
| Flamengo | 2007 | Série A | 36 | 0 | — | | 8 | 0 | 6 | 0 | 50 | 0 |
| Flamengo | 2008 | Série A | 37 | 1 | — | | 8 | 1 | 3 | 0 | 48 | 2 |
| Flamengo | 2009 | Série A | 37 | 0 | 6 | 0 | 2 | 0 | 18 | 1 | 63 | 1 |
| Flamengo | 2010 | Série A | 7 | 1 | — | | 9 | 0 | 17 | 0 | 33 | 1 |
| Flamengo | Total | | 134 | 2 | 6 | 0 | 27 | 1 | 44 | 1 | 211 | 4 |
| Career total | | | 158 | 2 | 8 | 0 | 27 | 0 | 47 | 1 | 240 | 4 |

according to combined sources on the Flamengo official website and Flaestatística.

- In 2006, Bruno played for Atlético Mineiro in the Brazilian Série B.

== List of goals scored ==
Following is the list of the goals scored by Bruno:

| # | Date | Venue | Host team | Result | Away team | Competition | Score | Type | Opponent goalkeeper | Ref |
|---|---|---|---|---|---|---|---|---|---|---|
| 1 | 23 April 2008 | Estádio do Maracanã, Rio de Janeiro | Flamengo | 2–0 | Coronel Bolognesi | Copa Libertadores | 1–0 | Free kick | Diego Penny | |
| 2 | 23 October 2008 | Estádio do Maracanã, Rio de Janeiro | Flamengo | 5–0 | Coritiba | Campeonato Brasileiro | 5–0 | Penalty kick | Vanderlei | |
| 3 | 4 February 2009 | Estádio do Maracanã, Rio de Janeiro | Flamengo | 4–1 | Mesquita | Campeonato Carioca | 4–1 | Free kick | Alonso | |
| 4 | 26 May 2010 | Estádio do Maracanã, Rio de Janeiro | Fluminense | 2–1 | Flamengo | Campeonato Brasileiro | 2–1 | Free kick | Rafael | |
| 5 | 22 October 2020 | Arena da Floresta, Rio Branco | Rio Branco | 1–1 | Bragantino-PA | Campeonato Brasileiro Série D | 1–0 | Penalty kick | Axel Lopes | |
| 6 | 30 May 2021 | Estádio Alziro de Almeida, Itaboraí | Atlético Carioca | 5–1 | Bela Vista | Campeonato Carioca Série C | 1–0 | Penalty kick | Clébio | |
| 7 | 19 June 2023 | Estádio Antônio Ferreira de Medeiros, Cardoso Moreira | Campos AA | 2–2 | Atlético Carioca | Campeonato Carioca Série C | 2–2 | Penalty kick | Barba | |

== Honours ==
Flamengo

- Taça Guanabara: 2007, 2008
- Taça Rio: 2009
- Rio de Janeiro State League: 2007, 2008, 2009
- Brazilian Série A: 2009
