= Rômulo (footballer, born February 1987) =

Brazilian footballer

Personal information
- Full name: Rômulo Noronha
- Date of birth: February 4, 1987 (age 39)
- Place of birth: Caxias do Sul, Brazil
- Height: 1.86 m (6 ft 1 in)
- Position: Defensive midfielder

Team information
- Current team: Boavista Sport Club

Youth career
- Juventude
- 2001–2007: Flamengo

Senior career*
Years	Team	Apps	(Gls)
2005–2012	Flamengo	26	(0)
2008	→ Paraná Clube (loan)	6	(0)
2009	→ Figueirense (loan)	0	(0)
2010–2011	→ Atlético Goianiense (loan)	12	(0)
2011	→ ABC (loan)	14	(1)
2013–	Boavista		
- * Club domestic league appearances and goals

Rômulo Noronha (born February 4, 1987, in Caxias do Sul), or simply Rômulo, is a Brazilian defensive midfielder.

== Career ==
=== Flamengo ===
Rômulo played few matches for the club in 2005 and 2006, but in the year of 2007 he had his first real chances in the first team, with coach Joel Santana. He played in the Campeonato Brasileiro Série A 2007 17 matches, all of them as a starter.

=== Injury and loan to Paraná ===
Although, in a derby match against Vasco da Gama he suffered a serious injury, a rupture in the knee ligaments and had been out of action for six months. Rômulo returned in the first half of the 2008 season. Out of coach Caio Júnior's plans he was loaned to Paraná and played in the Brazilian Série B until the end of 2008.

=== Figueirense ===
In 2009 Rômulo had a five month loan on Figueirense, he had six appearances, including two matches on Copa do Brasil.

=== Career statistics ===
(Correct as of May 20, 2012)

Club	Season	League		Cup		League Cup		Continental		Other		Total	
Club	Season	Apps	Goals	Apps	Goals	Apps	Goals	Apps	Goals	Apps	Goals	Apps	Goals
Flamengo	2005	0	0	1	0	–		–	–	1^{1}	0^{1}	2	0
Flamengo	2006	1	0	–	–	–		–	–	2^{2}	0^{2}	3	0
Flamengo	2007	17	0	0	0	–		–	–	0	0	17	0
Flamengo	2008	0	0	0	0	–		–	–	0	0	0	0
Paraná (loan)	2008	6	0	–	–	–		–	–	–	–	6	0
Figueirense (loan)	2009	–	–	2	0	–		–	–	4^{3}	0^{3}	6	0
Flamengo	2009	1	0	–	–	–		–	–	–	–	1	0
Flamengo	2010	6	0	–	–	–		3	0	1^{4}	0^{3}	10	0
Atlético Goianiense (loan)	2010	10	0	–	–	–		–	–	–	–	10	0
Atlético Goianiense (loan)	2011	2	0	–	–	–		–	–	–	–	2	0
ABC (loan)	2011	14	1	–	–	–		–	–	–	–	14	1
Flamengo	2012	1	0	–	–	–		–	–	2^{5}	0^{5}	3	0
Career total		44	0	3	0	–	–	3	0	10	0	60	0

according to combined sources on the Flamengo official website and Flaestatística.

- In 2008 Rômulo played for Paraná in the Brazilian Série B.

^{1} Including 1 match in the Campeonato Carioca
^{2} Including 2 matches in the Campeonato Carioca
^{3} Including 4 matches in the Campeonato Catarinense
^{4} Including 1 match in the Campeonato Carioca
^{5} Including 2 matches in the Campeonato Carioca
