= Emerson (footballer, born May 1983) =

Brazilian footballer

Personal information
- Full name: Emerson dos Santos da Silva
- Date of birth: 3 May 1983 (age 43)
- Place of birth: Taguatinga, Federal District, Brazil
- Height: 1.86 m (6 ft 1 in)
- Position: Centre back

Team information
- Current team: Gama

Youth career
- 1999–2001: Gama

Senior career*
Years	Team	Apps	(Gls)
2002–2004	Gama	22	(3)
2005	São Caetano	4	(1)
2006	Guarani	7	(0)
2006	Flamengo	1	(0)
2006–2007	Veranópolis	15	(0)
2007	Fortaleza	4	(1)
2008	Sertãozinho	15	(2)
2008–2010	Avaí	105	(16)
2011–2013	Coritiba	73	(9)
2013–2016	Atlético Mineiro	14	(0)
2015	→ Avaí (loan)	26	(2)
2016	→ Botafogo (loan)	31	(1)
2017	Botafogo	24	(0)
2017	Athletico Paranaense	7	(0)
2018	Joinville	6	(0)
2019–2020	Gama	45	(8)
2020–2021	Juventude	13	(0)
2021	Gama		
2021–2022	Capital CF		
2023–	Gama		
- * Club domestic league appearances and goals as of 8 April 2021

Emerson dos Santos da Silva (born 3 May 1983), simply known as Emerson, is a Brazilian footballer who plays for Gama as a central defender.

== Club career ==
Born in Taguatinga, Federal District, Emerson was a Gama youth graduate. After making his senior debut in 2002, he moved to São Caetano in 2005. In 2006, he was in Guarani, when in the middle of that year he went to Flamengo. Having stayed one month at Flamengo, Emerson ended up finishing that year as player Veranópolis. In 2007, around May, replaced by the Veranópolis Fortress where he remained until the end of the season.

Began the year 2008 in Sertãozinho, however, two months later, came to rescind his contract with the club in order to go play in Avaí Futebol Clube which became one of the highlights of the team in winning access The series in the Campeonato Brasileiro Serie B 2008.

In 2009, Emerson had great prominence along with the best Avai in a campaign of Santa Catarina a club in Serie A Brazilian Championship, finishing in sixth place with 57 points.

== Records ==
Emerson, who made his debut at Avaí on March 5, 2008 in an international friendly before the selection of Jamaica in the Avaí won 2-0, reached a staggering 100 games for the club on February 21, 2010 when Avaí tied for the 1-1 with Joinville in Joinville.

In 2011 he was summoned by national team coach Mano Menezes for the 2nd match against Argentina for that year's Superclasico de las Américas, due to take place in October in the Mangueirão Stadium, in Belém. However he did not enter the field of play during that match, an eventual 2-0 win in aggregate for the Brazilians.

He was also summoned for the Brazil games against Costa Rica and Mexico in October 2011; the latter game also marked the international retirement of Mexican keeper Oswaldo Sánchez and the final goal of Ronaldinho Gaúcho with the Brazil national team shirt. Brazil won the aforementioned match 2-1 and won 1-0 against Costa Rica, but Emerson remained on the bench for both matches.

=== Career statistics ===
(Correct as of October 16, 2010)

Club	Season	State League		Brazilian Série A		Copa do Brasil		Copa Sudamericana		Total	
Club	Season	Apps	Goals	Apps	Goals	Apps	Goals	Apps	Goals	Apps	Goals
Flamengo	2006	-	-	0	0	2	0	-	-	2	0
Total		-	-	0	0	2	0	-	-	2	0

== Honours ==
Flamengo

- Copa do Brasil: 2006

Avaí

- Campeonato Catarinense: 2009, 2010

Coritiba

- Campeonato Paranaense: 2011, 2012

=== Individual ===
- Best defender Campeonato Catarinense: 2009, 2010
