= Fabrício (footballer, born February 1990) =

Brazilian footballer (born 1990)

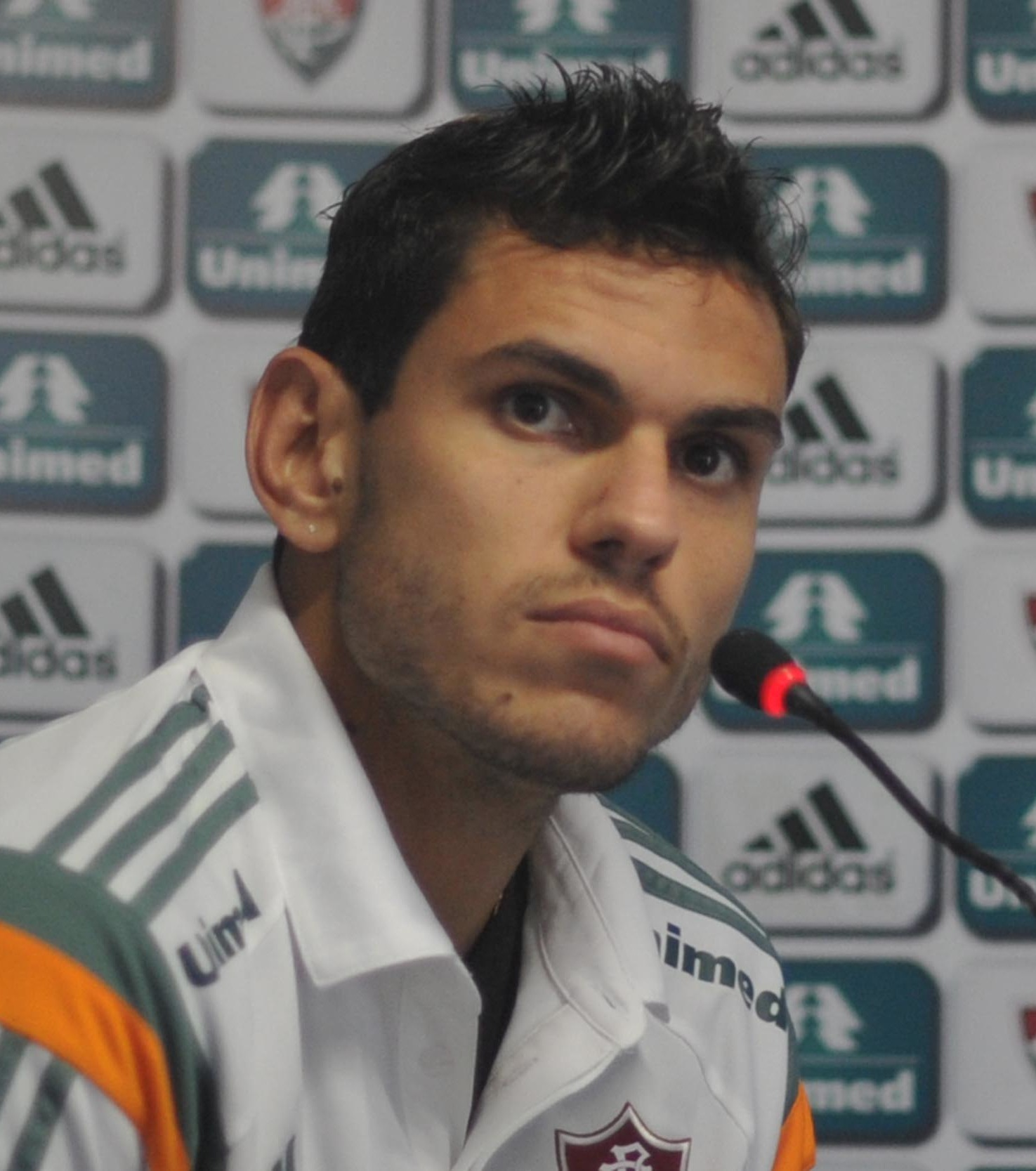
- Fabrício in 2014 with Fluminense

Personal information
- Full name: Fabrício Silva Dornellas
- Date of birth: 20 February 1990 (age 36)
- Place of birth: Rio de Janeiro, Brazil
- Height: 1.86 m (6 ft 1 in)
- Position: Centre back

Team information
- Current team: Volta Redonda
- Number: 4

Youth career
- 1998–2008: Flamengo

Senior career*
Years	Team	Apps	(Gls)
2008–2010	Flamengo	10	(0)
2008	→ Paraná (loan)	17	(2)
2009	→ 1899 Hoffenheim (loan)	6	(0)
2010	Palmeiras	16	(0)
2011	Cruzeiro	0	(0)
2011	Atlético Paranaense	20	(1)
2012	Vasco da Gama	9	(0)
2013	Vitória	11	(1)
2014	Fluminense	5	(0)
2015	Bragantino	3	(0)
2015	→ Partizan (loan)	13	(0)
2016	Muangthong United	0	(0)
2016–2017	Astra Giurgiu	23	(1)
2017	Ashdod	0	(0)
2017–2018	Omonia	13	(1)
2018	Aktobe	9	(0)
2018	Guarani	16	(2)
2019	Veracruz	10	(0)
2019–2021	Paraná	34	(4)
2021	CSA	15	(2)
2022	Ponte Preta	8	(0)
2022–2023	Hajer	30	(2)
2023	ABC	16	(0)
2024–	Volta Redonda	33	(3)

International career
2009	Brazil U20	2	(0)
- * Club domestic league appearances and goals as of 11 November 2026

Fabrício Silva Dornellas (born 20 February 1990) is a Brazilian professional footballer who plays as either a central or left-sided defender for Volta Redonda.

Fabrício represented Brazil at the 2009 FIFA U-20 World Cup, winning the silver medal.

== Club career ==
Born in Niterói, Rio de Janeiro, Fabrício started out in the youth system of Flamengo. He made his senior debut with Paraná, as a loaned player, in the 2008 Campeonato Brasileiro Série B. In January 2009, Fabrício moved to Germany, being loaned to 1899 Hoffenheim, with a view to a permanent deal. He made six Bundesliga appearances in the remainder of the 2008–09 season, before returning to the Mengão. Until the end of the year, Fabrício made seven league appearances, helping the club win the 2009 Campeonato Brasileiro Série A.

In August 2010, Fabrício switched to Palmeiras, recording 16 league appearances until the end of the season. He then signed with Cruzeiro in January 2011, before leaving the club after only a few months, without making any appearances, to join Atlético Paranaense.

In March 2012, Fabrício was acquired by Vasco da Gama. In January 2013, Fabrício signed with Vitória. In May 2014, Fabrício joined Fluminense. He made five appearances until the end of the 2014 Campeonato Brasileiro Série A. After six months without a club, Fabrício joined Bragantino, signing a contract in May 2015.

=== Partizan ===
On 18 June 2015, Fabrício was transferred to Serbian club Partizan, on a season-long loan. He was seriously injured in a friendly match against Russian club Terek Grozny and therefore missed some matches at the beginning of the season. Fabrício made his Serbian SuperLiga debut for Partizan on 25 July 2015 against Jagodina in a 6–0 home win.

=== FC Ashdod ===
On 9 June 2017, he signed for FC Ashdod. He made his debut on 31 July against Beitar Jerusalem on a 3–1 loss in Toto Cup.

=== Omonia Nicosia ===
On 2 August 2017, Cypriot First Division club Omonia Nicosia announced the signing of Fabrício. He made his debut on 10 September 2017 against Ethnikos Achna on the 2017-18 season's premier.

=== Aktobe ===
On 23 February 2018, Kazakhstan Premier League club FC Aktobe announced the signing of Fabrício.

=== Hajer ===
On 28 June 2022, Fabrício joined Saudi Arabian club Hajer.

== International career ==
Fabrício made two appearances at the 2009 FIFA U-20 World Cup, as Brazil finished as runner-up of the competition.

== Career statistics ==
Appearances and goals by club, season and competition
Club	Season	League		State League		Cup		State Cup		Continental		Total	
Club	Season	Apps	Goals	Apps	Goals	Apps	Goals	Apps	Goals	Apps	Goals	Apps	Goals
Paraná (loan)	2008	17	2	0	0	0	0	0	0	0	0	17	2
1899 Hoffenheim (loan)	2008–09	6	0	0	0	0	0	–		0	0	6	0
Flamengo	2009	7	0	0	0	0	0	0	0	1	0	8	0
Flamengo	2010	3	0	9	0	0	0	0	0	4	0	16	0
Flamengo	Total	10	0	9	0	0	0	0	0	5	0	24	0
Palmeiras	2010	16	0	0	0	0	0	0	0	4	0	20	0
Atlético Paranaense	2011	20	1	0	0	0	0	0	0	0	0	20	1
Vasco da Gama	2012	9	0	1	0	0	0	0	0	0	0	10	0
Vitória	2013	11	1	7	1	1	0	0	0	2	1	21	3
Fluminense	2014	5	0	0	0	1	0	0	0	0	0	6	0
Bragantino	2015	3	0	0	0	0	0	0	0	0	0	3	0
Partizan (loan)	2015–16	13	0	0	0	0	0	–		9	1	22	1
Astra Giurgiu	2016–17	23	1	0	0	5	0	1	0	9	0	38	1
FC Ashdod	2017–18	0	0	0	0	0	0	1	0	0	0	1	0
Career total		115	4	17	1	2	0	0	0	23	2	167	8

== Honours ==
=== Club ===
Flamengo

- Campeonato Brasileiro Série A: 2009

Cruzeiro

- Campeonato Mineiro: 2011

Vitória

- Campeonato Baiano: 2013

Astra Giurgiu

- Supercupa României : 2016

CSA

- Campeonato Alagoano: 2021

=== International ===
Brazil

- FIFA U-20 World Cup: Runner-up 2009
