= Fernando (footballer, born July 1986) =

Brazilian footballer

Personal information
- Full name: Fernando Ribeiro Fernandes
- Date of birth: July 16, 1986 (age 40)
- Place of birth: Goiânia (GO), Brazil
- Height: 1.83 m (6 ft 0 in)
- Position: Attacking midfielder

Team information
- Current team: Cuiabá

Senior career*
Years	Team	Apps	(Gls)
2007–2008	Mixto		
2008–2009	Flamengo		
2009	→ Volta Redonda (loan)		
2009	Atlético Goianiense		
2010	Vila Nova		
2010	→ Luverdense (loan)		
2011–2013	Cuiabá		
2014	Luverdense		
2014	CRB		
2015	Cuiabá		
2016	Santo André		
2017–	Cuiabá		
- * Club domestic league appearances and goals as of 20 May 2017

Fernando Ribeiro Fernandes (born July 16, 1986 in Goiânia), known as Fernando, is a Brazilian football attacking midfielder. He currently plays for Cuiabá.

== Career ==
Fernando joined Flamengo in August 2008, after playing ten Campeonato Brasileiro Série C games for Mixto, in which he scored ten goals.

=== Flamengo career statistics ===
(Correct as of October 23, 2008)

Club	Season	Carioca League			Brazilian Série A			Brazilian Cup			Copa Libertadores			Total		
Club	Season	Apps	Goals	Assists	Apps	Goals	Assists	Apps	Goals	Assists	Apps	Goals	Assists	Apps	Goals	Assists
Flamengo	2008	-	-	-	1	0	0	-	-	-	-	-	-	1	0	0

according to combined sources on the.

== Honours ==
Mixto

- Campeonato Mato-Grossense: 2008

Santo André

- Campeonato Paulista Série A2: 2016

Cuiabá

- Campeonato Mato-Grossense: 2017
