= Ives (footballer) =

Brazilian footballer (born 1985)

Personal information
- Full name: Ives Antero de Souza
- Date of birth: June 11, 1985 (age 41)
- Place of birth: Rio de Janeiro, Brazil
- Height: 1.73 m (5 ft 8 in)
- Position: Midfielder

Team information
- Current team: Rio Negro

Youth career
- 2001–2004: Heliópolis
- 2004–2005: Vasco da Gama

Senior career*
Years	Team	Apps	(Gls)
2005–2007	Vasco da Gama		
2007	→ Duque de Caxias (loan)		
2007	Náutico		
2008	Volta Redonda		
2008–2009	Progresul București		
2009	Mesquita		
2009	Flamengo		
2010	Rio Branco-PR		
2010	Paraná Clube		
2011	America		
2012	Roma Apucarana		
2013	Bangu		
2014	CSE		
2015–2017	Bangu		
2015	→ Madureira (loan)		
2017	América de Natal		
2017	Audax Rio		
2018–	Rio Negro		
- * Club domestic league appearances and goals as of July 21, 2008

Ives Antero de Souza (born June 11, 1985), known as Ives, is a Brazilian footballer, currently under contract for side Potiguar de Mossoró. He is 1.73 metres tall and weighs 72 kilograms.
