= 2007 Campeonato Carioca =

Campeonato Carioca
- Season: 2007
- Champions: Flamengo
- Relegated: Nova Iguaçu
- Copa do Brasil: Flamengo; Botafogo; Madureira
- Série C: Volta Redonda; América; Madureira; Friburguense
- Matches played: 76
- Goals scored: 266 (3.5 per match)
- Top goalscorer: Dodô (Botafogo); Marcelo (Madureira) - 13 goals
- Biggest home win: Botafogo 7-0 Friburguense (March 11, 2007)
- Biggest away win: Boavista 1-5 Volta Redonda (March 10, 2007); Boavista 2-6 Vasco da Gama (March 17, 2007); Nova Iguaçu 2-6 Botafogo (April 8, 2007)
- Highest scoring: Fluminense 4-4 Vasco da Gama (February 17, 2007); Boavista 2-6 Vasco da Gama (March 17, 2007); Nova Iguaçu 4-4 Boavista (April 1, 2007); Nova Iguaçu 2-6 Botafogo (April 8, 2007); Botafogo 4-4 Vasco da Gama (April 11, 2007)

The 2007 edition of the Campeonato Carioca kicked off on January 19 and ended on May 4, 2007. It is the official tournament organized by FFERJ (Federação de Futebol do Estado do Rio de Janeiro, or Rio de Janeiro State Football Federation. Only clubs based in the Rio de Janeiro State are allowed to play. Twelve teams contested this edition. Flamengo won the title for the 29th time.

== System ==
The tournament was divided in two stages:

- Taça Guanabara: The 12 clubs were divided into two groups. teams from each group played in single round-robin format against the others in their group. Top two teams in each group advanced to semifinal and then, to the final, played in two matches.
- Taça Rio: The teams from one group play against teams from the other group once. Top two teams in each group qualify to semifinal and final, to be played in two matches.
- Finals: Taça Guanabara and Taça Rio winners play twice at Maracanã Stadium. If the same club wins both stages, they will be declared champions and the final won't be necessary.

== Championship ==
=== Taça Guanabara ===
==== Group A ====
Pos	Team	Pld	W	D	L	GF	GA	GD	Pts	Qualification or relegation
1	Madureira	5	3	2	0	9	4	+5	11	Qualified to Semifinals
2	Flamengo	5	3	1	1	9	8	+1	10	Qualified to Semifinals
3	Botafogo	5	2	2	1	11	8	+3	8	
4	Boavista	5	1	3	1	8	8	0	6	
5	Americano	5	1	1	3	4	8	−4	4	
6	Cabofriense	5	0	1	4	4	9	−5	1	

Updated to match(es) played on February 17, 2007. Source: RSSSF.com
Rules for classification: 1) points; 2) wins; 3) goal difference; 4) number of goals scored.

==== Group B ====
Pos	Team	Pld	W	D	L	GF	GA	GD	Pts	Qualification or relegation
1	Vasco da Gama	5	3	1	1	17	8	+9	10	Qualified to Semifinals
2	América	5	3	1	1	10	7	+3	10	Qualified to Semifinals
3	Friburguense	5	3	0	2	9	10	−1	9	
4	Volta Redonda	5	2	1	2	7	11	−4	7	
5	Fluminense	5	1	2	2	8	10	−2	5	
6	Nova Iguaçu	5	0	1	4	5	10	−5	1	

Updated to match(es) played on February 17, 2007. Source: RSSSF.com
Rules for classification: 1) points; 2) wins; 3) goal difference; 4) number of goals scored.

==== Semifinals ====
Team 1	Score	Team 2
Madureira	2–1	América
Vasco da Gama	1–1 (1-3 pen.)	Flamengo

==== Finals ====
Team 1	Agg.	Team 2	1st leg	2nd leg
Madureira	2–4	Flamengo	1–0	1–4

=== Taça Rio ===
==== Group A ====
Pos	Team	Pld	W	D	L	GF	GA	GD	Pts	Qualification or relegation
1	Botafogo	6	5	0	1	19	5	+14	15	Qualified to Semifinals
2	Cabofriense	6	4	0	2	13	8	+5	12	Qualified to Semifinals
3	Madureira	6	4	0	2	11	7	+4	12	
4	Flamengo	6	3	0	3	10	10	0	9	
5	Americano	6	2	1	3	3	4	−1	7	
6	Boavista	6	1	1	4	15	23	−8	4	

Updated to match(es) played on April 8, 2007. Source: RSSSF.com
Rules for classification: 1) points; 2) wins; 3) goal difference; 4) number of goals scored.

==== Group B ====
Pos	Team	Pld	W	D	L	GF	GA	GD	Pts	Qualification or relegation
1	Volta Redonda	6	4	0	2	12	8	+4	12	Qualified to Semifinals
2	Vasco da Gama	6	3	1	2	14	7	+7	10	Qualified to Semifinals
3	Fluminense	6	3	0	3	9	8	+1	9	
4	Friburguense	6	3	0	3	8	15	−7	9	
5	América	6	2	0	4	6	13	−7	6	
6	Nova Iguaçu	6	0	1	5	8	20	−12	1	

Updated to match(es) played on April 8, 2007. Source: RSSSF.com
Rules for classification: 1) points; 2) wins; 3) goal difference; 4) number of goals scored.

==== Semifinals ====
Team 1	Score	Team 2
Botafogo	4–4 (4-1 pen.)	Vasco da Gama
Volta Redonda	1–1 (5-6 pen.)	Cabofriense

==== Finals ====
Team 1	Agg.	Team 2	1st leg	2nd leg
Botafogo	5–3	Cabofriense	2–2	3–1

=== Championship finals ===
Team 1	Agg.	Team 2	1st leg	2nd leg
Flamengo	4–4(4-2 pen.)	Botafogo	2–2	2–2

== Aggregate table ==
Pos	Team	Pld	W	D	L	GF	GA	GD	Pts	Qualification or relegation
1	Botafogo	11	7	2	2	30	13	+17	23	2008 Copa do Brasil
2	Madureira	11	7	2	2	20	11	+9	23	2008 Copa do Brasil and Série C
3	Vasco da Gama	11	6	2	3	31	15	+16	20	
4	Flamengo	11	6	1	4	19	18	+1	19	2008 Copa do Brasil
5	Volta Redonda	11	6	1	4	19	19	0	19	Série C
6	Friburguense	11	6	0	5	17	25	−8	18	Série C
7	América	11	5	1	5	16	20	−4	16	Série C
8	Fluminense	11	4	2	5	17	18	−1	14	
9	Cabofriense	11	4	1	6	17	17	0	13	
10	Americano	11	3	2	6	7	12	−5	11	
11	Boavista	11	2	4	5	23	31	−8	10	
12	Nova Iguaçu	11	0	2	9	13	30	−17	2	Relegated

Updated to match(es) played on April 8, 2007. Source: RSSSF.com
Rules for classification: 1) points; 2) wins; 3) goal difference; 4) number of goals scored.
