= André Lima (footballer, born January 1985) =

Brazilian footballer

Personal information
- Full name: André Lima Pedro
- Date of birth: January 17, 1985 (age 41)
- Place of birth: Osasco, Brazil
- Height: 1.70 m (5 ft 7 in)
- Position: Left back

Team information
- Current team: Sertãozinho

Youth career
- 2003–2004: Grêmio Barueri
- 2005: Flamengo

Senior career*
Years	Team	Apps	(Gls)
2005–2009	Flamengo	44	(0)
2007	→ Fortaleza (loan)	?	(?)
2008	→ Macaé (loan)	?	(?)
2009	→ Volta Redonda (loan)	?	(?)
2010	Sport Barueri	3	(0)
2010	Ceilândia	3	(0)
2010	Legião	0	(0)
2011	Ceilândia	8	(1)
2011	Oeste	1	(0)
2012–	Sertãozinho		
- * Club domestic league appearances and goals

André Lima Pedro (born January 17, 1985), sometimes known as just André, is a Brazilian left back. He currently plays for Sertãozinho Futebol Clube.

== Honours ==
- Brazilian Cup: 2006
- Rio de Janeiro State League: 2007
