= 2006 Copa do Brasil =

Copa do Brasil 2006

Tournament details
- Country: Brazil
- Dates: February 15 – July 26
- Teams: 64

Final positions
- Champions: Flamengo (RJ)
- Runners-up: Vasco da Gama (RJ)

Tournament statistics
- Matches played: 112
- Goals scored: 346 (3.09 per match)
- Top goal scorer: (Brazil) Valdiram (7)

The 2006 Copa do Brasil was the 18th staging of the Copa do Brasil.

The competition started on February 15, 2006 and concluded on July 26, 2006 with the second leg of the final, held at the Estádio do Maracanã in Rio de Janeiro, in which Flamengo lifted the trophy for the second time with a 1–0 victory over its rival Vasco da Gama.

Valdiram, of Vasco da Gama, with 7 goals, was the competition's topscorer.

== Format ==
The competition was disputed by 64 clubs in a knock-out format where all rounds were played over two legs and the away goals rule was used, but in the first two rounds if the away team won the first leg with an advantage of at least two goals, the second leg was not played and the club automatically qualified to the next round.

== Competition stages ==
1st Round
1	ASA (AL)	1 1
64	Flamengo (RJ)	1 2
33	Parnahyba (PI)	0 1
32	ABC (RN)	1 5
17	Estrela do Norte (ES)	1 0
48	Guarani (SP)	1 3
49	Potiguar (RN)	2 2
16	Santo André (SP)	0 1
9	Hermann Aichinger (SC)	0
56	Atlético (MG)	3
41	Mineiros (GO)	3 2
24	Americano (RJ)	1 4
25	Vilhena (RO)	1
40	Fortaleza (CE)	3
57	Ceilândia (DF)	0 2
8	Bahia (BA)	0 1
5	Operário (MS)	1 1
60	Botafogo (RJ)	2 5
37	Serra (ES)	1
28	Ipatinga (MG)	3
21	Icasa (CE)	0 1
44	Coritiba (PR)	0 3
53	Rio Branco (AC)	0 1
12	Náutico (PE)	1 4
13	Sergipe (SE)	0 0
52	Santos (SP)	0 3
45	URT (MG)	3 1
20	Londrina (PR)	2 1
29	São Raimundo (RR)	0
36	Brasiliense (DF)	2
61	Itabaiana (SE)	0 1
4	Remo (PA)	0 4
3	Botafogo (PB)	1 0
62	Vasco (RJ)	1 7
35	Ulbra (RS)	2
30	Iraty (PR)	4
19	Cabofriense (RJ)	1 1
46	São Caetano (SP)	1 4
51	Novo Hamburgo (RS)	2 1
14	Criciúma (SC)	2 2
11	Moto Club (MA)	1
54	Atlético (PR)	3
43	Volta Redonda (RJ)	2 1 (pen: 7)
22	América (MG)	1 2 (pen: 6)
27	Piauí (PI)	1 0
38	Grêmio (RS)	2 4
59	15 de Novembro (RS)	4 0
6	Noroeste (SP)	1 2
7	Operário (MT)	2 1
58	Fluminense (RJ)	3 3
39	CENE (MS)	2 3
26	Treze (PB)	1 1
23	Colinas (TO)	0
42	Paysandu (PA)	2
55	Grêmio Coariense (AM)	2
10	Vila Nova (GO)	5
15	Nacional (AM)	2
50	Cruzeiro (MG)	5
47	São José (AP)	0 0
18	CRB (AL)	1 3
31	Vila Aurora (MT)	0 0
34	Santa Cruz (PE)	0 1
63	Imperatriz (MA)	1 2
2	Vitória (BA)	1 5

2nd Round
Flamengo (RJ)	1 4
ABC (RN)	0 0
Guarani (SP)	4
Potiguar (RN)	0
Atlético (MG)	2 4
Mineiros (GO)	3 1
Fortaleza (CE)	1 3
Ceilândia (DF)	1 1
Botafogo (RJ)	0 1
Ipatinga (MG)	3 3
Coritiba (PR)	0 0
Náutico (PE)	2 0
Santos (SP)	3
URT (MG)	1
Brasiliense (DF)	3 1
Remo (PA)	1 0
Vasco (RJ)	2 5
Iraty (PR)	2 1
São Caetano (SP)	4 0
Criciúma (SC)	1 4
Atlético (PR)	1 0
Volta Redonda (RJ)	2 0
Grêmio (RS)	0 1 (pen: 5)
15 de Novembro (RS)	1 0 (pen: 6)
Fluminense (RJ)	5
CENE (MS)	3
Paysandu (PA)	1 1
Vila Nova (GO)	3 0
Cruzeiro (MG)	2
CRB (AL)	0
Santa Cruz (PE)	2 2
Vitória (BA)	2 3

3rd Round
Flamengo (RJ)	5 0
Guarani (SP)	1 1
Atlético (MG)	0 3
Fortaleza (CE)	2 1
Ipatinga (MG)	3 3
Náutico (PE)	1 1
Santos (SP)	2 1
Brasiliense (DF)	1 1
Vasco (RJ)	2 1
Criciúma (SC)	1 0
Volta Redonda (RJ)	1 1
15 de Novembro (RS)	0 2
Fluminense (RJ)	2 4
Vila Nova (GO)	2 0
Cruzeiro (MG)	1 4
Vitória (BA)	2 0

Quarterfinals
Flamengo (RJ)	4 0
Atlético (MG)	1 0
Ipatinga (MG)	1 1 (pen: 5)
Santos (SP)	1 1 (pen: 3)
Vasco (RJ)	0 2
Volta Redonda (RJ)	0 1
Fluminense (RJ)	3 1
Cruzeiro (MG)	2 0

Semifinals
Flamengo (RJ)	1 2
Ipatinga (MG)	1 1
Vasco (RJ)	1 1
Fluminense (RJ)	0 1

Finals
Flamengo (RJ)	2 1
Vasco (RJ)	0 0

== Finals ==
July 19, 2006
21:45

Flamengo	2 – 0	Vasco da Gama
Obina 59'; Luizão 62'

Maracanã, Rio de Janeiro
Attendance: 45,000
Referee: Leonardo Gaciba

July 26, 2006
21:30 CEST

Vasco da Gama	0 – 1 (0 – 3 agg.)	Flamengo
		Juan 27'

Maracanã, Rio de Janeiro
Attendance: 45,000
Referee: Carlos Eugênio Simon

Vasco da Gama	Flamengo

GK	1	(Brazil) Cássio
RB	2	(Brazil) Wagner Diniz	(yellow card) 39'
CB	3	(Brazil) Fábio Braz
CB	4	(Brazil) Jorge Luiz
LB	6	(Brazil) Diego
DM	5	(Brazil) Ygor
DM	19	(Brazil) Andrade		(substituted off) 53'
MF	9	(Brazil) Ramon		(substituted off) 32'
AM	8	(Brazil) Morais	Booked	(substituted off) 57'
FW	10	(Brazil) Edilson (c)
FW	7	(Brazil) Valdir Papel	(red card) 17'
Substitutes:
MF	15	(Brazil) Abedi		(substituted on) 53'	Booked
MF	16	(Brazil) Ernane		(substituted on) 57'
FW	18	(Brazil) Valdiram		(substituted on) 32'
Manager:
(Brazil) Renato Gaúcho

GK	1	(Brazil) Diego
DF	3	(Brazil) Renato Silva
DF	4	(Brazil) Fernando	Booked
DF	8	(Brazil) Rodrigo Arroz
RM	2	(Brazil) Leonardo Moura
DM	5	(Brazil) Jonatas (c)
DM	7	(Brazil) Toró	(yellow card) 12'	(substituted off) 19'
CM	11	(Brazil) Renato
AM	10	(Brazil) Renato Augusto	Booked	(substituted off) 76'
LM	6	(Brazil) Juan
FW	9	(Brazil) Luizão	(yellow card) 25'	(substituted off) 86'
Substitutes:
MF	16	(Brazil) Léo		(substituted on) 86'
FW	17	(Uruguay) Horacio Peralta		(substituted on) 76'
FW	18	(Brazil) Obina		(substituted on) 19'
Manager:
(Brazil) Ney Franco

Copa do Brasil
2006 Winners
Flamengo
Second Title
