= 2008 Campeonato Carioca =

Campeonato Carioca
- Season: 2008
- Champions: Flamengo
- Relegated: América; Cardoso Moreira
- Copa do Brasil: Flamengo; Botafogo; Fluminense
- Série C: Macaé; Boavista; Madureira; Duque de Caxias
- Matches: 128
- Goals: 423 (3.3 per match)
- Top goalscorer: Wellington Paulista (Botafogo) - 14 goals
- Biggest home win: Botafogo 7-0 Macaé (March 23, 2008)
- Biggest away win: América 2-5 Duque de Caxias (January 19, 2008); Flamengo 1-4 Fluminense (February 10, 2008)
- Highest scoring: Madureira 6-3 Americano (February 2, 2008); Resende 5-4 Boavista (March 26, 2008)

This Campeonato Carioca was the 108th edition of football of FFERJ (Federação de Futebol do Estado do Rio de Janeiro, or Rio de Janeiro State Football Federation). It stated play on January 19 and ended on May 4, 2008. The tournament was expanded from twelve to sixteen teams. Flamengo won the title for the 30th time, América was relegated (having been in the first tier since 1908), along with the recently promoted Cardoso Moreira.

== System ==
The tournament was divided in two stages:

- Taça Guanabara: The 16 clubs were divided into two groups. teams from each group played in single round-robin format against the others in their group. Top two teams in each group advanced to semifinal and then, to the final, played in one single match at Maracanã Stadium.
- Taça Rio: The teams from one group played the teams from the other group once. Top two teams in each group qualify to semifinal and final, to be played in one single match at Maracanã Stadium.
- Finals: Taça Guanabara and Taça Rio winners play twice at Maracanã Stadium. If the same club wins both stages, they will be declared champions and the final won't be necessary.

== Championship ==
=== Taça Guanabara ===
==== Group A ====
| Pos | Team | Pld | W | D | L | GF | GA | GD | Pts | Qualification or relegation |
|---|---|---|---|---|---|---|---|---|---|---|
| 1 | Flamengo | 7 | 6 | 0 | 1 | 19 | 7 | +12 | 18 | Qualified to Semifinals |
| 2 | Fluminense | 7 | 5 | 2 | 0 | 23 | 8 | +15 | 17 | Qualified to Semifinals |
| 3 | Macaé | 7 | 3 | 2 | 2 | 9 | 5 | +4 | 11 | |
| 4 | Boavista | 7 | 3 | 2 | 2 | 11 | 10 | +1 | 11 | |
| 5 | Volta Redonda | 7 | 2 | 1 | 4 | 13 | 14 | −1 | 7 | |
| 6 | Duque de Caxias | 7 | 2 | 1 | 4 | 12 | 16 | −4 | 7 | |
| 7 | Cardoso Moreira | 7 | 2 | 1 | 4 | 9 | 19 | −10 | 7 | |
| 8 | América | 7 | 0 | 1 | 6 | 8 | 25 | −17 | 1 | |

Updated to match(es) played on February 10 2008. Source: RSSSF.com
Rules for classification: 1) points; 2) wins; 3) goal difference; 4) number of goals scored.

==== Group B ====
| Pos | Team | Pld | W | D | L | GF | GA | GD | Pts | Qualification or relegation |
|---|---|---|---|---|---|---|---|---|---|---|
| 1 | Botafogo | 7 | 5 | 1 | 1 | 20 | 8 | +12 | 16 | Qualified to Semifinals |
| 2 | Vasco da Gama | 7 | 5 | 0 | 2 | 19 | 8 | +11 | 15 | Qualified to Semifinals |
| 3 | Madureira | 7 | 4 | 1 | 2 | 15 | 11 | +4 | 13 | |
| 4 | Cabofriense | 7 | 3 | 1 | 3 | 13 | 14 | −1 | 10 | |
| 5 | Friburguense | 7 | 3 | 1 | 3 | 7 | 8 | −1 | 10 | |
| 6 | Resende | 7 | 2 | 0 | 5 | 5 | 14 | −9 | 6 | |
| 7 | Mesquita | 7 | 1 | 3 | 3 | 5 | 14 | −9 | 6 | |
| 8 | Americano | 7 | 1 | 1 | 5 | 5 | 12 | −7 | 4 | |

Updated to match(es) played on February 10 2008. Source: RSSSF.com
Rules for classification: 1) points; 2) wins; 3) goal difference; 4) number of goals scored.

==== Semifinals ====
| Team 1 | Score | Team 2 |
|---|---|---|
| Botafogo | 2–0 | Fluminense |
| Flamengo | 2–1 | Vasco da Gama |

==== Finals ====
| Team 1 | Score | Team 2 |
|---|---|---|
| Botafogo | 1–2 | Flamengo |

=== Taça Rio ===
==== Group A ====
| Pos | Team | Pld | W | D | L | GF | GA | GD | Pts | Qualification or relegation |
|---|---|---|---|---|---|---|---|---|---|---|
| 1 | Fluminense | 8 | 6 | 1 | 1 | 23 | 10 | +13 | 19 | Qualified to Semifinals |
| 2 | Flamengo | 8 | 5 | 2 | 1 | 19 | 9 | +10 | 17 | Qualified to Semifinals |
| 3 | Boavista | 8 | 3 | 2 | 3 | 15 | 16 | −1 | 11 | |
| 4 | Volta Redonda | 8 | 3 | 1 | 4 | 12 | 16 | −4 | 10 | |
| 5 | Macaé | 8 | 3 | 1 | 4 | 11 | 16 | −5 | 10 | |
| 6 | Duque de Caxias | 8 | 3 | 0 | 5 | 9 | 15 | −6 | 9 | |
| 7 | América | 8 | 2 | 3 | 3 | 9 | 9 | 0 | 9 | |
| 8 | Cardoso Moreira | 8 | 0 | 2 | 6 | 6 | 14 | −8 | 2 | |

Updated to match(es) played on April 6, 2008. Source: RSSSF.com
Rules for classification: 1) points; 2) wins; 3) goal difference; 4) number of goals scored.

==== Group B ====
| Pos | Team | Pld | W | D | L | GF | GA | GD | Pts | Qualification or relegation |
|---|---|---|---|---|---|---|---|---|---|---|
| 1 | Botafogo | 8 | 7 | 0 | 1 | 23 | 7 | +16 | 21 | Qualified to Semifinals |
| 2 | Vasco da Gama | 8 | 5 | 1 | 2 | 20 | 7 | +13 | 16 | Qualified to Semifinals |
| 3 | Resende | 8 | 3 | 4 | 1 | 20 | 19 | +1 | 13 | |
| 4 | Cabofriense | 8 | 3 | 2 | 3 | 8 | 8 | 0 | 11 | |
| 5 | Madureira | 8 | 3 | 1 | 4 | 7 | 12 | −5 | 10 | |
| 6 | Americano | 8 | 3 | 0 | 5 | 7 | 14 | −7 | 9 | |
| 7 | Friburguense | 8 | 2 | 1 | 5 | 10 | 18 | −8 | 7 | |
| 8 | Mesquita | 8 | 1 | 3 | 4 | 10 | 19 | −9 | 6 | |

Updated to match(es) played on April 6, 2008. Source: RSSSF.com
Rules for classification: 1) points; 2) wins; 3) goal difference; 4) number of goals scored.

==== Semifinals ====
| Team 1 | Score | Team 2 |
|---|---|---|
| Fluminense | 1–1 (5-4 pen.) | Vasco da Gama |
| Botafogo | 3–0 | Flamengo |

==== Finals ====
| Team 1 | Score | Team 2 |
|---|---|---|
| Botafogo | 1–0 | Fluminense |

=== Championship finals ===
| Team 1 | Agg. | Team 2 | 1st leg | 2nd leg |
|---|---|---|---|---|
| Flamengo | 4–1 | Botafogo | 1–0 | 3–1 |

== Aggregate table ==
| Pos | Team | Pld | W | D | L | GF | GA | GD | Pts | Qualification or relegation |
|---|---|---|---|---|---|---|---|---|---|---|
| 1 | Botafogo | 15 | 12 | 1 | 2 | 43 | 15 | +28 | 37 | 2009 Copa do Brasil |
| 2 | Fluminense | 15 | 11 | 3 | 1 | 46 | 18 | +28 | 36 | 2009 Copa do Brasil |
| 3 | Flamengo | 15 | 11 | 2 | 2 | 38 | 16 | +22 | 35 | 2009 Copa do Brasil |
| 4 | Vasco da Gama | 15 | 10 | 1 | 4 | 39 | 15 | +24 | 31 | |
| 5 | Madureira | 15 | 7 | 2 | 6 | 22 | 23 | −1 | 23 | Série C |
| 6 | Boavista | 15 | 6 | 4 | 5 | 26 | 26 | 0 | 22 | Série C |
| 7 | Cabofriense | 15 | 6 | 3 | 6 | 21 | 22 | −1 | 21 | |
| 8 | Macaé | 15 | 6 | 3 | 6 | 20 | 21 | −1 | 21 | Série C |
| 9 | Resende | 15 | 5 | 4 | 6 | 25 | 33 | −8 | 19 | |
| 10 | Volta Redonda | 15 | 5 | 2 | 8 | 25 | 30 | −5 | 17 | |
| 11 | Friburguense | 15 | 5 | 2 | 8 | 17 | 26 | −9 | 17 | |
| 12 | Duque de Caxias | 15 | 5 | 1 | 9 | 21 | 31 | −10 | 16 | Série C |
| 13 | Americano | 15 | 4 | 1 | 10 | 12 | 26 | −14 | 13 | |
| 14 | Mesquita | 15 | 2 | 6 | 7 | 15 | 33 | −18 | 12 | |
| 15 | América | 15 | 2 | 4 | 9 | 17 | 34 | −17 | 10 | Relegated |
| 16 | Cardoso Moreira | 15 | 2 | 3 | 10 | 15 | 33 | −18 | 9 | Relegated |

Updated to match(es) played on April 6, 2008. Source: RSSSF.com
Rules for classification: 1) points; 2) wins; 3) goal difference; 4) number of goals scored.
