= Diego (footballer, born 1982) =

Brazilian footballer

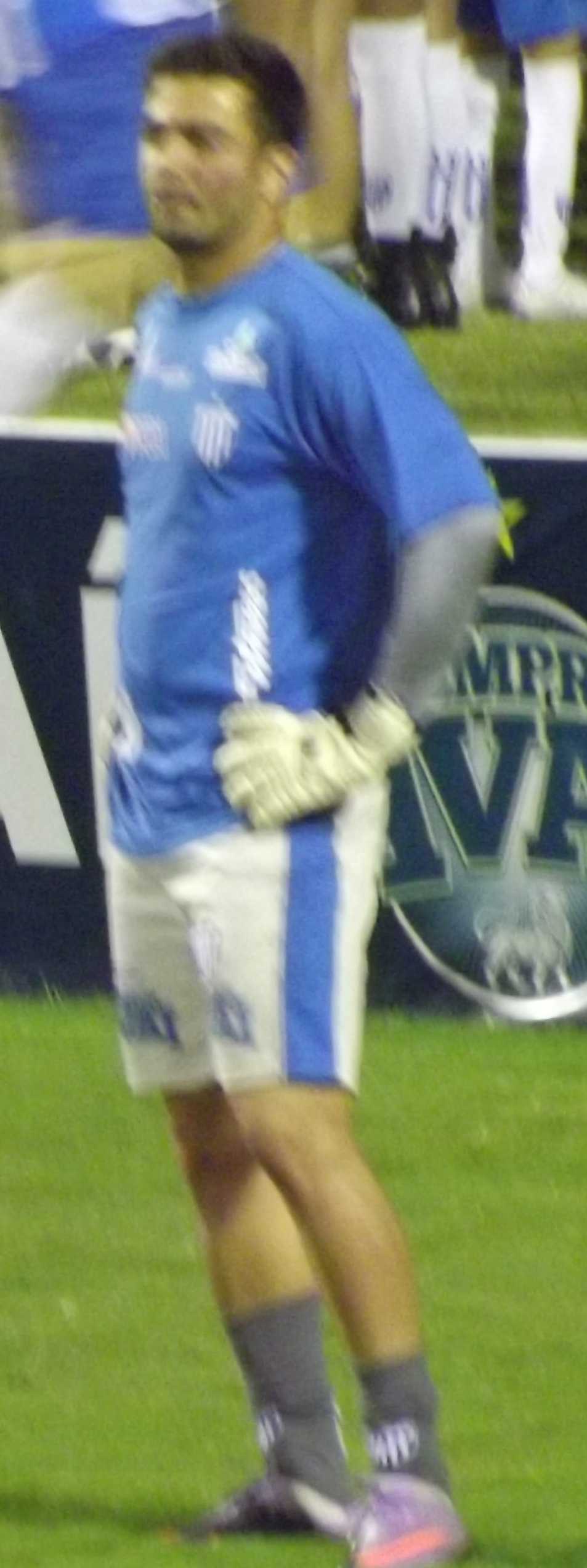
- Diego in 2012

Personal information
- Full name: Diego Salgado Costa de Menezes
- Date of birth: 2 February 1982 (age 44)
- Place of birth: São Gonçalo, Rio de Janeiro, Brazil
- Height: 1.85 m (6 ft 1 in)
- Position: Goalkeeper

Youth career
- 1996–2001: Flamengo

Senior career*
Years	Team	Apps	(Gls)
2002–2009	Flamengo	101	(0)
2009	Madureira	0	(0)
2009	→ Flamengo (loan)	0	(0)
2009	Flamengo	1	(0)
2010–2011	Ceará	32	(0)
2012	Boavista	0	(0)
2012–2015	Avaí	63	(0)
2013	→ Mirassol (loan)	0	(0)
2016–2017	Santo André	0	(0)
Total		197	(0)
- * Club domestic league appearances and goals

Diego Salgado Costa de Menezes, or simply Diego (born 2 February 1982), is a Brazilian former professional footballer who played as a goalkeeper.

== Career ==
Diego made his professional debut for Flamengo against Atlético Paranaense in a 3–2 home victory on 11 September 2002 in the Brazilian Série A.

In January 2009, he signed with Madureira, and right after loaned back to Flamengo. On 10 July 2009 he left Madureira signing once again with Flamengo.

In January 2010, Diego signed for Ceará.

== Career statistics ==
(Correct as of 29 August 2010)

Club	Season	State League		Brazilian Série A		Copa do Brasil		Copa Libertadores		Copa Sudamericana		Total	
Club	Season	Apps	Goals	Apps	Goals	Apps	Goals	Apps	Goals	Apps	Goals	Apps	Goals
Flamengo	2002	9	0	10	0	-	-	0	0	-	-	19	0
Flamengo	2003	2	0	11	0	2	0	-	-	1	0	16	0
Flamengo	2004	2	0	15	0	1	0	-	-	0	0	18	0
Flamengo	2005	14	0	42	0	5	0	-	-	-	-	61	0
Flamengo	2006	9	0	20	0	12	0	-	-	-	-	41	0
Flamengo	2007	2	0	2	0	-	-	0	0	-	-	4	0
Flamengo	2008	2	0	1	0	-	-	0	0	-	-	3	0
Flamengo (loan)	2009	3	0	0	0	0	0	-	-	0	0	3	0
Flamengo	2009	0	0	1	0	0	0	-	-	0	0	1	0
Total		43	0	102	0	20	0	0	0	1	0	166	0
Ceará	2010	-	-	17	0	1	0	-	-	-	-	18	0
Total		0	0	17	0	1	0	0	0	0	0	18	0
Career total		43	0	119	0	21	0	0	0	1	0	184	0

according to combined sources on the Flamengo official website and Flaestatística.

== Honours ==
Flamengo

- Taça Guanabara: 2004, 2007, 2008
- Taça Rio: 2009
- Rio de Janeiro State League: 2004, 2007, 2008, 2009
- Brazilian Cup: 2006
- Brazilian Série A: 2009

Avaí

- Santa Catarina State League: 2012
