= Friburguense Atlético Clube =

Brazilian football club

Friburguense
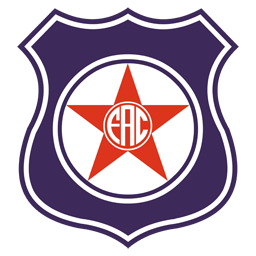
- Full name: Friburguense Atlético Clube
- Nickname(s): Frizão; Tricolor da Serra (Mountain Tricolour)
- Founded: March 14, 1980; 45 years ago
- Ground: Estádio Eduardo Guinle
- Capacity: 6,000
- Chairman: Wagner Faria
- Manager: Cadão
- League: Campeonato Carioca Série B1
- 2024: Carioca Série B1, 5th of 9
Home colors	Away colors

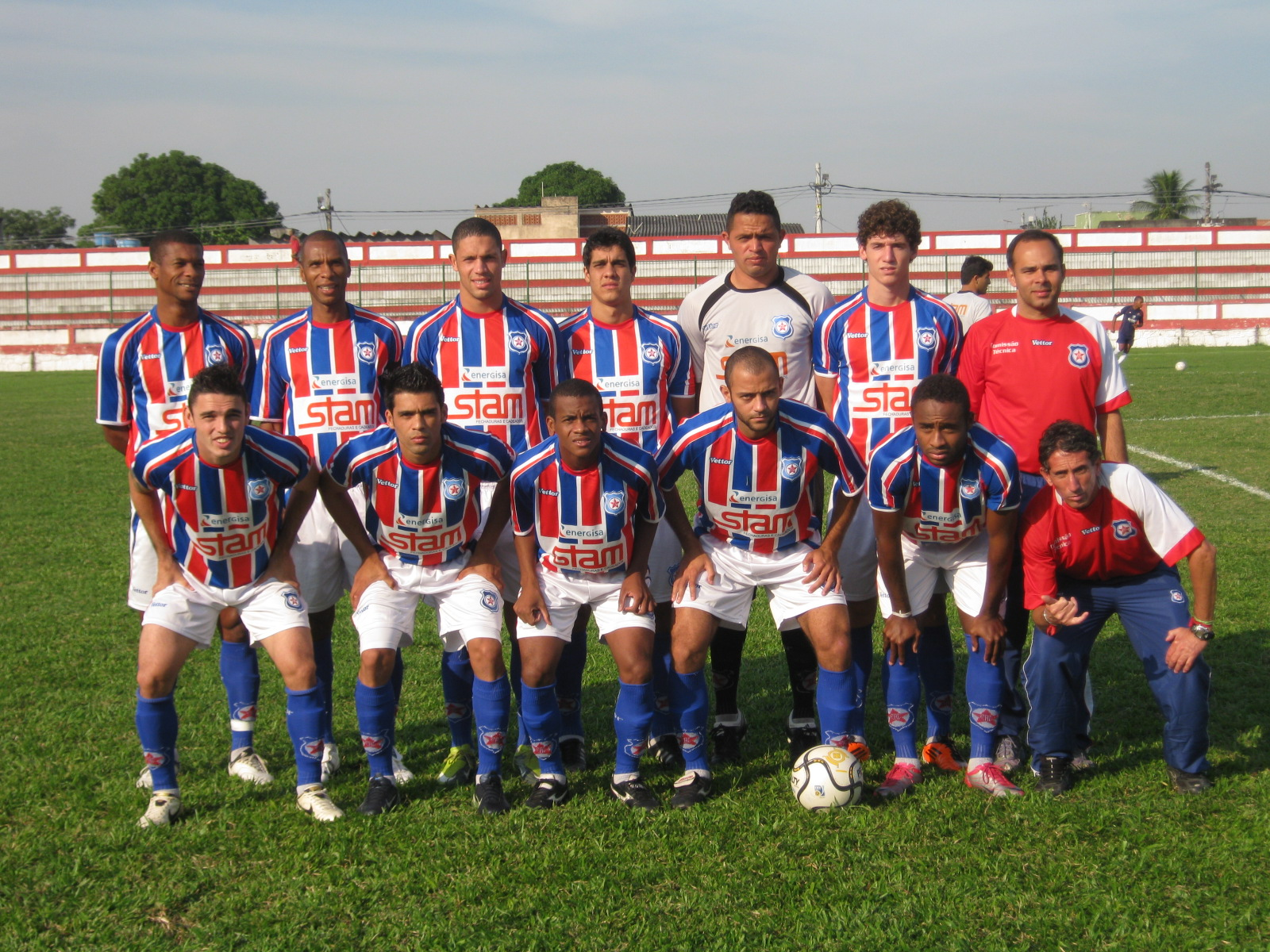
Team photo from the 2011 season

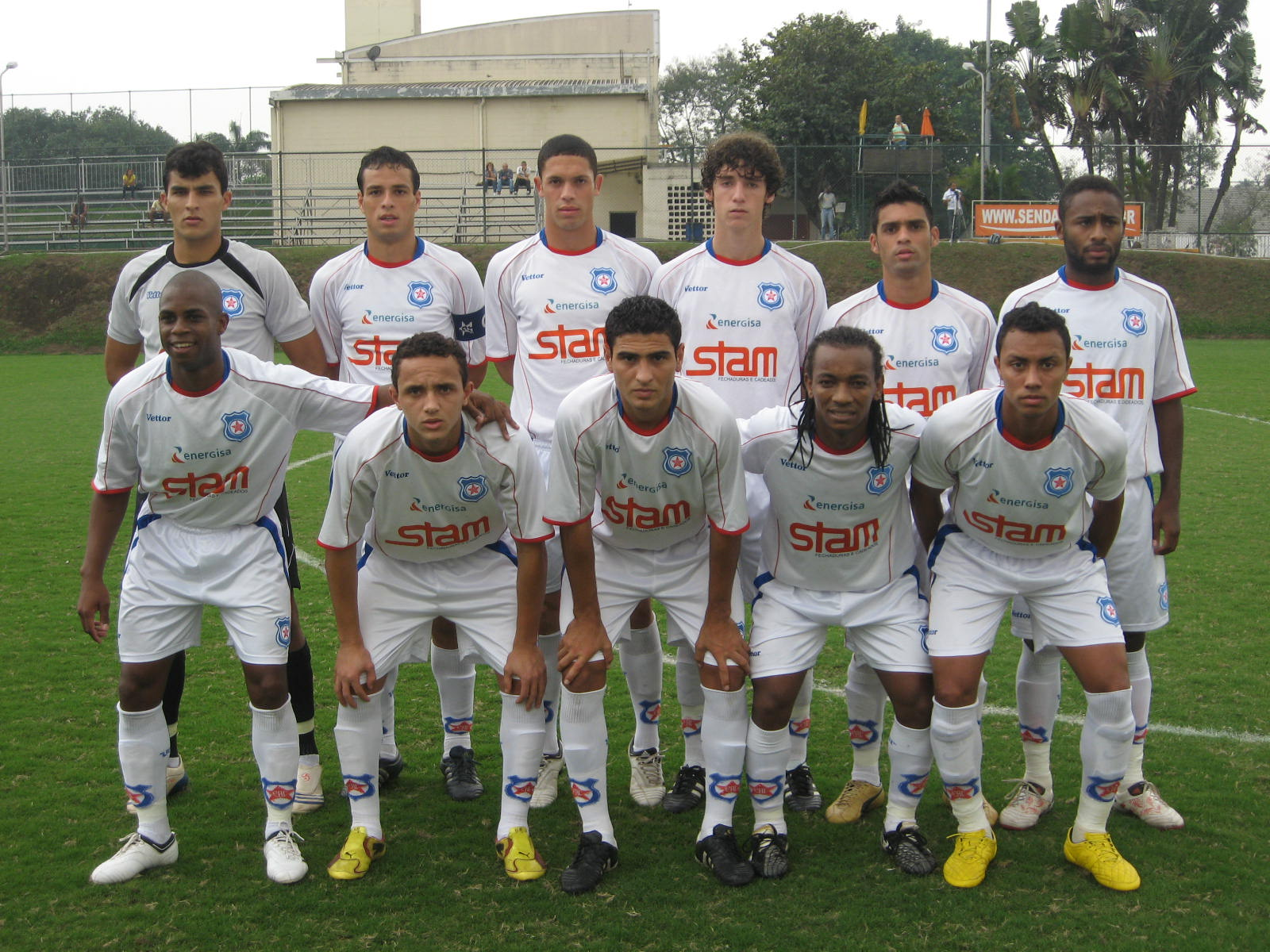
Team photo from the 2010 season

Friburguense Atlético Clube, or Friburguense as they are usually called, is a Brazilian football team from Nova Friburgo in Rio de Janeiro, founded on March 14, 1980.

They currently play in the Campeonato Carioca and play their games at the Estadio Eduardo Guinle, which has a capacity for 10,000.

== History ==
Friburguense Atlético Clube was founded on March 14, 1980 after Fluminense Atlético Clube (founded in 1921) and Serrano Futebol Clube (founded in 1934) fused.

As Fluminense, the team participated in the 1979 Campeonato Carioca, and Friburguense participated in the 1980 and 1981 editions, both of the times being eliminated in the preliminary stage. In 1984, the club competed in the Campeonato Carioca First Division, but finished in the 11th place, and was relegated. The team returned in 1988, only to be relegated again.

In 1997, Friburguense won its first title. The club won the Campeonato Carioca Second Division, after defeating Ceres in the final (1-0 in the first leg, and 1-1 in the second leg), and was promoted to the 1998 first division.

In 2005, for the first time in the club's history, Friburguense competed in the Copa do Brasil. The club was eliminated in the second round by Internacional, after a 1-1 draw in Nova Friburgo, and a 4-0 defeat in Porto Alegre. In the first round, the club beat Caldense 4-1 in the first leg, and 1-2 in the second leg).

== Honours ==
=== Official tournaments ===
State
Competitions	Titles	Seasons
Campeonato Carioca Série A2	2	1997, 2019

=== Others tournaments ===
==== State ====
- Troféu João Ellis Filho (1): 2009
- Taça Corcovado (1): 2019

=== Runners-up ===
- Copa Rio (2): 2011, 2016
- Campeonato Carioca Série A2 (4): 1983, 1987, 1994, 2011
