= 2009 Campeonato Carioca =

Campeonato Carioca
- Season: 2009
- Champions: Flamengo
- Relegated: Cabofriense; Mesquita
- Copa do Brasil: Flamengo; Botafogo; Vasco da Gama
- Série D: Macaé; Friburguense; Madureira
- Matches played: 134
- Goals scored: 409 (3.05 per match)
- Best Player: Maicosuel (Botafogo)
- Top goalscorer: Maicosuel (Botafogo) - 12 goals
- Biggest home win: Tigres do Brasil 5-0 Boavista (March 21, 2009)

This Campeonato Carioca was the 109th edition of football of FFERJ (Federação de Futebol do Estado do Rio de Janeiro, or Rio de Janeiro State Football Federation). It started play on January 24, 2009 and ended on May 3, 2009. Sixteen teams contested this edition.

América and Cardoso Moreira, relegated the previous year, were replaced by Bangu and Tigres, respectively winners and runners-up of the lower level championship in 2008.

== Teams ==
Club	City	Pos. in 2008	Number of Titles (until 2008)
Flamengo	Rio de Janeiro	Champions	30
Botafogo	Rio de Janeiro	Runners-up	18
Fluminense	Rio de Janeiro	3rd	30
Vasco	Rio de Janeiro	4th	22
Madureira	Rio de Janeiro	5th	-
Boavista	Saquarema	6th	-
Cabofriense	Cabo Frio	7th	-
Macaé	Macaé	8th	-
Resende	Resende	9th	-
Volta Redonda	Volta Redonda	10th	-
Friburguense	Nova Friburgo	11th	-
Duque de Caxias	Duque de Caxias	12th	-
Americano	Campos	13th
Mesquita	Mesquita	14th	-
Bangu	Rio de Janeiro	2nd Level champions	2
Tigres	Rio de Janeiro	2nd Level runners-up	-

== System ==
The 16 clubs were divided into two groups.

Group A: Americano, Cabofriense, Duque de Caxias, Fluminense, Madureira, Resende, Tigres and Vasco;
Group B: Bangu, Boavista, Botafogo, Flamengo, Friburguense, Macaé, Mesquita and Volta Redonda.

The tournament was divided in two stages:

- Taça Guanabara: teams from each group played in single round-robin format against the others in their group. The two top placed teams in each group advanced to semifinal and then, to the final, played in one single match at Maracanã Stadium. Botafogo won the title, defeating surprising Resende in the final.
- Taça Rio: teams from one group play against teams from the other group once. Top two teams in each group qualify to semifinal and final, to be played in one single match at Maracanã Stadium. Botafogo reached this final as well, however they were unable to clinch the title as Flamengo won 1-0 to force a championship aggregate to decide the state title.
- Finals: Taça Guanabara and Taça Rio winners play twice at Maracanã Stadium. If the same club wins both stages, it will be declared champions and the final will not be necessary. Botafogo and Flamengo played the finals, with Flamengo winning the title on penalties.

== Championship ==
=== Taça Guanabara ===
==== Group A ====
Pos	Team	Pld	W	D	L	GF	GA	GD	Pts	Qualification or relegation
1	Fluminense	7	3	2	2	12	7	+5	11	Qualified to Semifinals
2	Resende	7	3	1	3	12	12	0	10	Qualified to Semifinals
3	Cabofriense	7	2	3	2	12	10	+2	9	Taça Moisés Mathias de Andrade
4	Americano	7	2	3	2	9	7	+2	9	Taça Moisés Mathias de Andrade
5	Duque de Caxias	7	2	3	2	10	13	−3	9	
6	Vasco da Gama	7	4	2	1	13	4	+9	8 (Note: Vasco da Gama lost 6 points for fielding a ineligible player)	
7	Madureira	7	1	4	2	5	9	−4	7	
8	Tigres do Brasil	7	1	2	4	5	16	−11	5	

Updated to match(es) played on February 15, 2009. Source: RSSSF.com
Rules for classification: 1) points; 2) wins; 3) goal difference; 4) number of goals scored.

==== Group B ====
Pos	Team	Pld	W	D	L	GF	GA	GD	Pts	Qualification or relegation
1	Flamengo	7	5	1	1	16	6	+10	16	Qualified to Semifinals
2	Botafogo	7	5	2	0	13	6	+7	17	Qualified to Semifinals
3	Macaé	7	3	1	3	11	8	+3	10	Taça Moisés Mathias de Andrade
4	Mesquita	7	2	2	3	10	12	−2	8	Taça Moisés Mathias de Andrade
5	Bangu	7	2	1	4	10	13	−3	7	
6	Volta Redonda	7	2	1	4	7	11	−4	7	
7	Boavista	7	1	4	2	9	10	−1	7	
8	Friburguense	7	1	2	4	8	18	−10	5	

Updated to match(es) played on February 15, 2009. Source: RSSSF.com
Rules for classification: 1) points; 2) wins; 3) goal difference; 4) number of goals scored.

==== Taça Moisés Mathias de Andrade ====
===== Semifinals =====
Team 1	Score	Team 2
Macaé	0–0 (pen. 4-5)	Americano
Cabofriense	1–2	Mesquita

===== Finals =====
Team 1	Score	Team 2
Americano	1–0	Mesquita

==== Semifinals ====
Team 1	Score	Team 2
Flamengo	1–3	Resende
Fluminense	0–1	Botafogo

==== Finals ====
Team 1	Score	Team 2
Botafogo	3–0	Resende

=== Taça Rio ===
==== Group A ====
Pos	Team	Pld	W	D	L	GF	GA	GD	Pts	Qualification or relegation
1	Vasco da Gama	8	8	0	0	22	5	+17	24	Qualified to Semifinals
2	Fluminense	8	6	2	0	17	8	+9	20	Qualified to Semifinals
3	Tigres do Brasil	8	3	2	3	17	13	+4	11	Taça João Ellis Filho
4	Madureira	8	3	0	5	11	16	−5	9	Taça João Ellis Filho
5	Americano	8	2	2	4	11	15	−4	8	
6	Duque de Caxias	8	2	1	5	11	19	−8	7	
7	Resende	8	2	1	5	5	15	−10	7	
8	Cabofriense	8	2	0	6	7	17	−10	6	

Updated to match(es) played on April 5, 2009. Source: RSSSF.com
Rules for classification: 1) points; 2) wins; 3) goal difference; 4) number of goals scored.

==== Group B ====
Pos	Team	Pld	W	D	L	GF	GA	GD	Pts	Qualification or relegation
1	Flamengo	8	5	2	1	18	9	+9	17	Qualified to Semifinals
2	Botafogo	8	5	1	2	22	12	+10	16	Qualified to Semifinals
3	Friburguense	8	5	0	3	9	9	0	15	Taça João Ellis Filho
4	Boavista	8	4	1	3	14	13	+1	13	Taça João Ellis Filho
5	Bangu	8	4	1	3	11	14	−3	13	
6	Macaé	8	3	1	4	13	2	+11	10	
7	Volta Redonda	8	2	2	4	14	13	+1	8	
8	Mesquita	8	0	0	8	7	19	−12	0	

Updated to match(es) played on April 5, 2009. Source: RSSSF.com
Rules for classification: 1) points; 2) wins; 3) goal difference; 4) number of goals scored.

==== Taça João Ellis Filho ====
===== Semifinals =====
Team 1	Score	Team 2
Tigres do Brasil	2–1	Boavista
Friburguense	2–2 (pen. 5-4)	Madureira

===== Finals =====
Team 1	Score	Team 2
Tigres do Brasil	2–2 (pen. 7-8)	Friburguense

==== Semifinals ====
Team 1	Score	Team 2
Vasco da Gama	0–4	Botafogo
Flamengo	1–0	Fluminense

==== Finals ====
Team 1	Score	Team 2
Botafogo	0–1	Flamengo

=== Championship finals ===
Team 1	Agg.	Team 2	1st leg	2nd leg
Botafogo	4–4 (pen. 2-4)	Flamengo	2–2	2–2

== Aggregate table ==
Pos	Team	Pld	W	D	L	GF	GA	GD	Pts	Qualification or relegation
1	Flamengo	15	10	4	1	31	15	+16	34	2010 Copa do Brasil
2	Vasco da Gama	15	12	2	1	35	9	+26	32	2010 Copa do Brasil
3	Botafogo	15	10	2	3	42	22	+20	32	2010 Copa do Brasil
4	Fluminense	15	9	4	2	29	15	+14	31	
5	Macaé	15	6	2	7	24	20	+4	20	Série D
6	Bangu	15	6	2	7	21	27	−6	20	
7	Friburguense	15	6	2	7	17	27	−10	20	Série D
8	Boavista	15	5	5	5	23	23	0	20	
9	Resende	15	5	2	8	17	27	−10	17	
10	Americano	15	4	5	6	20	22	−2	17	
11	Tigres do Brasil	15	4	4	7	22	29	−7	16	
12	Madureira	15	4	4	7	16	25	−9	16	Série D
13	Duque de Caxias	15	4	4	7	21	32	−11	16	
14	Volta Redonda	15	4	3	8	21	24	−3	15	
15	Cabofriense	15	4	3	8	19	27	−8	15	Relegated
16	Mesquita	15	2	2	11	17	31	−14	8	Relegated

Updated to match(es) played on April 5, 2009. Source: RSSSF.com
Rules for classification: 1) points; 2) wins; 3) goal difference; 4) number of goals scored.
