= List of Brazilian football transfers 2008 =

This is a list of Brazilian football transfers for the 2008 season. Only moves featuring at least one Série A or Série B club are listed.

The Brazilian transfer window is open all year round. The only deadline in Brazilian football is at the end of September when domestic transfers between Brazilian Clubs are halted until 31 December. Players within those clubs however are still free to move or arrive from abroad between September and December.

Players listed who have transferred to their new club for "Free" in Brazil do so under the guidelines of the Pelé Law. This is not to be confused with a similar and equivalent sister law in European Football known as the Bosman ruling.

== Player transfers ==
KEY: F = Free; L = Loan; LR = Loan Return; R=Released; U = Undisclosed

Date	Name	moving from	moving to	Fee
2007-12-28	Marcinho Guerreiro	Arsenal Kyiv	Santos	L
2008-01-08	Betão	Corinthians	Santos	F
2008-04-29	Lima	Juventus-SP	Santos	L
2008-02-06	Douglas	Sertãozinho	Santos	U
2008-01-09	Evaldo	FC Tokyo	Santos	L
2008-01-16	Júnior	Santos	Rio Claro	L
2008-01-08	Danilo	Santos	Uberaba	L
2008-01-08	Roni	Santos	Uberaba	L
2008-04-20	Fahel	Beira-Mar	Atlético-PR	U
2008-03-25	Dejan Petković	Santos	Atlético Mineiro	F
2008-02-20	Jhon	Náutico	Internacional	L
2008-04-08	Almir	Cabofriense	Atlético Mineiro	L
2007-12-20	Ricardo Martinez	Libertad	Atlético Mineiro	L
2007-12-06	Márcio Araújo	Kashiwa Reysol	Atlético Mineiro	LR
2007-12-24	Agustín Viana	Nacional	Atlético Mineiro	L
2007-12-09	Marcelo Nicácio	Votoraty-SP	Atlético Mineiro	R$800,000
2007-12-29	Nêgo	ABC	Atlético Mineiro	U
2007-12-26	Marques	Yokohama Marinos	Atlético Mineiro	R$2,000,000
2007-12-22	Nicholas	Atlético Mineiro	CRB	L
2007-12-06	Rancharia	Atlético Mineiro	F Agent	R
2007-12-05	Coelho	Atlético Mineiro	Corinthians	LR
2008-02-15	Coelho	Corinthians	Atlético Mineiro	L
2008-05-06	Carlos Alberto	São Paulo	Botafogo	L
2008-02-14	Wellington Saci	Itumbiara	Corinthians	U
2008-03-08	Douglas	São Caetano	Corinthians	L
2007-12-06	Ricardinho	Atlético Mineiro	Coritiba	LR
2007-12-17	Marcinho	Atlético Mineiro	Flamengo	L
2007-12-20	Batista	Atlético Mineiro	CRB	L
2008-01-06	Lúcio	Atlético Mineiro	Fortaleza	U
2008-01-29	Galvão	Atlético Mineiro	São Caetano	U
2007-12-16	Leandro Carrijo	Atlético Mineiro	Portuguesa-SP	L
2007-12-28	Bilú	Atlético Mineiro	F Agent	R
2007-12-20	Galatto	Grêmio	Atlético-PR	U
2007-12-18	Leandro Bambu	Joinville	Atlético-PR	U
2007-12-12	Irênio	Veracruz	Atlético-PR	U
2008-01-02	Rodrigão	Palmeiras	Atlético-PR	U
2007-12-24	Lucas	Atlético-PR	Fortaleza	L
2007-12-24	Rogerinho	Atlético-PR	Fortaleza	L
2007-12-07	Alex Mineiro	Atlético-PR	Palmeiras	U
2007-12-26	Edno	Atlético-PR	Noroeste	L
2007-12-28	Marcelo	Atlético-PR	Ipatinga	L
2007-12-31	Erandir	Atlético-PR	Fortaleza	L
2008-01-04	Juan Castillo	Peñarol	Botafogo	U
2007-12-28	Luis Escalada	LDU Quito	Botafogo	L
2007-12-28	Fábio	Gama	Botafogo	L
2007-12-28	André Luís	Cruzeiro	Botafogo	U
2007-12-07	Alexis Ferrero	Tigre	Botafogo	U
2007-12-05	Triguinho	Anderlecht	Botafogo	L
2007-12-06	Zé Carlos	Cerezo Osaka	Botafogo	U
2007-12-13	Marcelinho	Vasco	Botafogo	L
2007-12-15	Wellington Paulista	Alavés	Botafogo	U
2008-01-04	Abedi	Hapoel Tel Aviv	Botafogo	L
2007-12-28	Túlio Souza	Coritiba	Botafogo	U
2008-01-02	Édson	Corinthians-AL	Botafogo	L
2008-01-07	Max	Botafogo	Vila Nova-GO	L
2007-11-19	Júlio César	Botafogo	F Agent	R
2007-12-07	Juninho	Botafogo	São Paulo	R$500,000
2007-11-13	Alex	Botafogo	São Paulo	LR
2007-12-19	Rafael Marques	Botafogo	F Agent	R
2008-01-31	Moreno	Botafogo	Udinese	U
2007-11-12	Joílson	Botafogo	São Paulo	L
2008-01-04	Zé Roberto	Botafogo	Schalke	€3,500,000
2007-12-21	Dodô	Botafogo	Fluminense	U
2008-01-04	Reinaldo	Botafogo	Grêmio	L
2008-01-10	Igor	Botafogo	Sport	U
2007-12-25	William	Grêmio	Corinthians	U
2007-12-12	Valença	Náutico	Corinthians	F
2007-12-10	Chicão	Figueirense	Corinthians	U
2007-12-14	Cristián Suárez	Unión San Felipe	Corinthians	U
2007-12-18	Beto Acosta	Náutico	Corinthians	F
2007-11-19	Lima	São Caetano	Corinthians	F
2008-01-01	Rafinha	São Bernardo-SP	Corinthians	L
2008-01-01	Germán Herrera	Gimnasia La Plata	Corinthians	F
2008-01-04	Marcel	Paulista	Corinthians	U
2008-01-08	Perdigão	Vasco	Corinthians	U
2008-01-09	Alessandro	Santos	Corinthians	F
2008-01-01	André Santos	Figueirense	Corinthians	U
2008-01-15	Ricardo Bóvio	Málaga CF	Corinthians	F
2008-01-21	Fabinho	Toulouse FC	Corinthians	€1,500,000
2008-01-12	Vampeta	Corinthians	Juventus-SP	F
2007-12-29	Gustavo Nery	Corinthians	Fluminense	U
2008-01-21	Eduardo Ratinho	Corinthians	Toulouse FC	L
2008-01-14	Fábio Braz	Corinthians	Boavista-RJ	U
2008-02-13	Júnior Negão	Corinthians	Madureira	U
2007-12-12	Juan Arce	Corinthians	Oriente Petrolero	LR
2007-12-24	Rafael Fefo	Corinthians	Marília	L
2008-01-16	Roger	Corinthians	Grêmio	L
2008-01-25	Zelão	Corinthians	Saturn	U
2008-01-11	Kadu	Corinthians	Bragantino	L
2008-01-13	Marcelo	Corinthians	Ituano	L
2008-01-23	Clodoaldo	Corinthians	Pohang Steelers	L
2008-01-17	Wilson	Corinthians	Genoa	U
2008-05-08	Elias	Ponte Preta	Corinthians	U
2008-05-08	Sandro	Anapolina	Portuguesa-SP	U
2008-05-08	Wilton Goiano	São Caetano	Portuguesa-SP	U
2008-05-07	Marcelo Nicácio	Atlético Mineiro	América-RN	L
2008-05-07	Leandrinho	Marília	Ponte Preta	U
2008-05-09	Leandro Amaral	Fluminense	Vasco	U
2008-05-07	Dedimar	Juventus-SP	Santo André	U
2008-01-08	Rubens Cardoso	Internacional	Coritiba	U
2008-01-11	Dick	Joinville	Coritiba	L
2008-01-11	Ânderson Lima	Coritiba	Ituano	F
2007-12-26	Paulo Almeida	Coritiba	Náutico	F
2007-12-27	Adriano	Coritiba	Oeste-SP	F
2008-01-11	Fabinho	Coritiba	Goiás	F
2007-12-27	Juninho	Coritiba	F Agent	R
2007-12-27	Caíco	Coritiba	F Agent	R
2007-12-27	Igor	Coritiba	F Agent	R
2008-01-14	Giovanny Espinoza	Vitesse Arnhem	Cruzeiro	L
2007-12-14	Andrey	Steaua Bucharest	Cruzeiro	U
2007-09-21	Apodi	Vitória	Cruzeiro	R$900,000
2007-12-20	Fabrício	Júbilo Iwata	Cruzeiro	U
2008-02-26	Elicarlos	Náutico	Cruzeiro	U
2008-01-09	Jadílson	São Paulo	Cruzeiro	L
2008-01-11	Marcel	Grêmio	Cruzeiro	L
2008-01-03	Alecsandro	Cruzeiro	Al-Wahda	R$7,000,000
2008-01-05	Marcelo Tavares	Cruzeiro	Al-Hilal	L
2008-01-08	Carlinhos Bala	Cruzeiro	Sport	L
2007-12-03	Gustavo	Sport	Figueirense	U
2007-12-12	Bruno	Paraná	Figueirense	F
2007-11-30	Elton	Alavés	Figueirense	U
2007-12-12	Wellington Amorim	Marília	Figueirense	F
2007-12-20	Edu Sales	Nacional	Figueirense	U
2007-12-20	Bruno Santos	IFK Norrköping	Figueirense	U
2008-01-11	Marquinho	Botafogo	Figueirense	F
2007-12-14	Rogerinho	Figueirense	Al-Wasl	U
2007-12-07	Jean Carlos	Figueirense	Levski Sofia	€600,000
2007-12-14	Peter	Figueirense	Grêmio	U
2007-09-26	Kléberson	Beşiktaş	Flamengo	F
2007-12-17	Rodrigo	Dynamo Kyiv	Flamengo	L
2007-12-21	Jônatas	Espanyol	Flamengo	L
2007-12-27	Diego Gavilán	Grêmio	Flamengo	F
2008-01-15	Diego Tardelli	São Paulo	Flamengo	$1,000,000
2008-01-03	Éder	Guarani	Flamengo	L
2007-12-01	Leonardo	Flamengo	Paraná	LR
2007-12-20	Hélder	Flamengo	Botafogo-RJ	U
2007-12-22	Bruno Mezenga	Flamengo	Macaé	L
2007-12-30	Darío Conca	Vasco	Fluminense	L
2007-12-21	Washington	Urawa Reds	Fluminense	U
2007-12-27	Leandro Amaral	Vasco	Fluminense	U
2008-01-04	Ygor Santiago	Start	Fluminense	L
2008-01-22	Alex Dias	Fluminense	Goiás	U
2007-11-14	Jean Carlos	Fluminense	Vasco	L
2007-12-22	Juliano	Fluminense	CRAC-GO	L
2007-11-19	Ivan	Fluminense	Gaziantepspor	L
2008-01-14	Lenny	Fluminense	Palmeiras	U
2007-12-30	Alex	Paraná	Goiás	L
2008-01-03	Fernando	São Paulo	Goiás	U
2008-01-07	Rafael Marques	F Agent	Goiás	F
2008-01-07	Anderson Aquino	Sport	Goiás	L
2008-01-06	Júlio César	Náutico	Goiás	L
2008-01-14	Alex Terra	Ponte Preta	Goiás	F
2007-12-19	Pedro Henrique	Goiás	CRAC-GO	L
2008-01-04	André Luís	Caxias	Grêmio	L
2008-01-04	Paulo Sérgio	Palmeiras	Grêmio	L
2007-12-18	Victor	Paulista	Grêmio	U
2007-12-07	Júnior	Flamengo	Grêmio	L
2007-12-18	Tadeu	Juventude	Grêmio	F
2007-12-28	Edixon Perea	Bordeaux	Grêmio	€885,000
2007-12-11	Sebastián Saja	Grêmio	San Lorenzo	LR
2007-12-07	Patrício	Grêmio	Portuguesa-SP	F
2007-12-03	Tcheco	Grêmio	Al-Ittihad	U
2007-12-17	Sandro Goiano	Grêmio	Sport	F
2007-12-19	Tuta	Grêmio	São Caetano	F
2008-01-11	Diego Souza	Grêmio	Palmeiras	€3,750,000
2008-01-02	Rubén Bustos	Grêmio	Internacional	F
2008-01-08	Andrezinho	Pohang Steelers	Internacional	L
2008-01-07	Élder Granja	Internacional	Palmeiras	F
2008-05-06	Odacir	Grêmio	Náutico	L
2007-12-15	Márcio Santos	Tianjin Teda	Náutico	U
2007-12-26	Jhonnes	NK Celje	Náutico	L
2007-12-16	Berg	América-RN	Náutico	L
2007-12-06	Rafael Carneiro	Fluminense-BA	Náutico	U
2007-12-21	Ricardo Laborde	Academia	Náutico	U
2007-12-14	Ticão	Sport	Náutico	L
2007-12-15	Marquinhos Paraná	Vila Nova-GO	Náutico	U
2007-12-14	Marcelinho	Atlético-PR	Náutico	L
2008-05-15	Felipe Santana	Figueirense	Borussia Dortmund	U
2007-12-26	Warley	Brasiliense	Náutico	F
2008-01-02	Kuki	Santa Cruz	Náutico	LR
2007-12-06	Sidny	Náutico	Livorno	R$600,000
2007-12-13	Daniel Paulista	Náutico	Sport	U
2008-01-14	Caio	Palmeiras	Eintracht Frankfurt	€4,000,000
2008-01-29	Edmundo	Palmeiras	Vasco	U
2007-11-23	Deola	Palmeiras	Sertãozinho	L
2007-12-11	Abu	Internacional	Vasco	U
2008-05-15	Uendel	Criciúma	Fluminense	U
2008-05-06	Viáfara	Atlético-PR	Vitória	L
2008-01-14	Thiago Gomes	Palmeiras	Guaratinguetá	L
2007-12-22	Júlio Santos	Vasco	Portuguesa-SP	F
2007-12-11	Carlos Alberto	Brasiliense	Portuguesa-SP	F
2007-12-20	Tiago	Portuguesa-SP	Vasco	U
2008-01-26	Leonardo	Portuguesa-SP	Olympiacos	€2,000,000
2007-12-07	Joãozinho	Portuguesa-SP	Levski Sofia	U
2008-01-03	Pedrinho	Santos	Al Ain FC	F
2008-01-07	Marcos Aurélio	Santos	Shimizu S-Pulse	U
2008-01-29	Claudio Maldonado	Santos	Fenerbahçe	U
2007-12-12	César	Sport	Figueirense	U
2008-01-15	Carlos Alberto	Werder Bremen	São Paulo	L
2007-12-29	Éder Luís	Atlético Mineiro	São Paulo	L
2007-12-20	Adriano	Inter	São Paulo	L
2007-12-29	Jorge Wagner	Betis	São Paulo	€2,500,000
2007-12-14	Breno	São Paulo	Bayern Munich	€9,000,000
2007-12-14	Ricardo	Caxias	Vasco	L
2007-11-22	Calisto	Rubin	Vasco	U
2007-12-20	Jonílson	Vegalta Sendai	Vasco	U
2007-12-10	Beto	Brasiliense	Vasco	F
2007-12-14	Madson	Duque de Caxias	Vasco	LR
2007-12-06	Villanueva	Ulsan Hyundai Horang-i	Vasco	L
2007-12-26	Marcus Vinícius	Boavista	Vasco	L
2008-01-03	Diego	Goiás	Vasco	LR
2008-01-02	Marquinho	Guarani	Vasco	L
2008-01-07	Bruno Reis	Alania Vladikavkaz	Vasco	F
2007-11-15	Silvio Luiz	Vasco	Itumbiara	F
2007-12-27	Cássio	Vasco	F Agent	R
2008-01-29	Emiliano Dudar	Vasco	FC Chiasso	U
2007-12-18	Thiago Maciel	Vasco	Ipatinga	L
2007-12-15	Claudemir	Vasco	Catanduvense-SP	L
2007-11-23	Rubens Júnior	Vasco	F Agent	R
2008-01-02	Guilherme	Vasco	UD Almería	U
2008-02-18	Martín Carvalho	Vasco	Palmeiras	U
2008-01-09	Enílton	Vasco	Sport	L
2007-12-21	Faioli	Vasco	Boavista-RJ	L
2008-01-03	Ernane	Vasco	Ipatinga	L
2008-01-05	Eduardo	Vasco	Duque de Caxias	L
2008-01-05	Madson	Vasco	Duque de Caxias	L
2007-12-26	Zé Maria	Sheffield United	Portuguesa	U
2008-03-18	Zé Antônio	Häcken	Atlético-PR	L
2008-04-30	Wellington	São Caetano	Náutico	L
2008-05-12	Valmir	Palmeiras	Vasco	U
2008-05-15	Vinícius	Ituano	Vasco	U
2008-05-15	Hugo	Ituano	Vasco	U
2008-01-07	Taílson	Atlético-PR	Fortaleza	L
2008-02-29	Marcos Tamandaré	Rapid Bucharest	Coritiba	L
2008-01-10	Thiago	Fluminense	Cruzeiro	F
2008-01-08	Thiago Gentil	Figueirense	Aris Saloniki	U
2008-05-07	Thiago Prado	Kyoto Sanga	Figueirense	U
2008-02-15	Thiago Silva	Atlético Mineiro	América-MG	L
2008-01-23	Tiago Bernardi	SCR Altach	Coritiba	U
2008-04-26	Toninho	Guaratinguetá	Ipatinga	L
2008-04-26	Jackson	Guaratinguetá	Ipatinga	L
2008-05-19	Marcel	Cruzeiro	Grêmio	L
2008-03-05	Sandro	Vitória	Treze	U
2008-04-22	Sandro Silva	Mirassol	Palmeiras	L
2008-04-22	Fabinho Capixaba	Mirassol	Palmeiras	L
2008-04-22	Jefferson	Guaratinguetá	Palmeiras	L
2008-05-05	João Paulo	Inter-SM	Náutico	U
2008-02-01	Serginho	São Paulo	Marília	U
2007-11-29	Sérvulo	América-RN	Atlético Mineiro	U
2008-04-29	Sidnei	Atlético Mineiro	Portuguesa-SP	L
2008-01-04	Silvinho	Albirex Niigata	Vitória	U
2008-01-04	Marcelo Silva	Náutico	Vitória	U
2008-02-09	Soares	Fluminense	Grêmio	U
2008-02-12	Souza	América-RN	Atlético Mineiro	U
2008-01-29	Souza	São Paulo	PSG	U
2008-01-18	Rafael Dias	Goiás	Sertãozinho	L
2008-01-22	Rafael Mineiro	Náutico	Treze	L
2008-01-30	Ramon	Atlético-PR	Vitória	F
2008-05-17	Reinaldo	Corinthians-AL	Cruzeiro	R$1,200,000
2008-04-30	Réver	Paulista	Grêmio	U
2008-04-22	Ricardinho	Villa Nova-MG	Ipatinga	L
2008-04-25	Ricardo Lopes	Sertãozinho	Internacional	L
2007-12-14	Roberto Lopes	Vasco	Boavista-RJ	L
2008-03-01	Róbston	Botafogo	Atlético-GO	U
2008-04-13	Rodrigão	Atlético-PR	Vitória	L
2008-05-12	Rodrigo	Dynamo Kyiv	São Paulo	U
2008-01-29	Rodrigo Fabri	Paulista	Figueirense	U
2008-01-16	Rodrigo Tiuí	Fluminense	Sporting	F
2008-04-22	Rodriguinho	Brasiliense	Ipatinga	L
2008-05-19	Dininho	Palmeiras	Flamengo	U
2008-03-07	Roger	Al-Nasr	Sport	L
2008-05-20	Ramón	Portuguesa	Figueirense	U
2008-04-28	Eduardo Ramos	Anapolina	Corinthians	U
2008-05-12	Jumar	Paraná	Palmeiras	L
2008-03-04	Sebastián Pinto	Santos	F Agent	R
2008-05-19	Sandro	Cruzeiro	Nacional	L
2008-05-19	Diego Renan	Cruzeiro	Nacional	L
2008-05-19	Maicon	Cruzeiro	Nacional	L
2008-05-19	Marcelo Moreno	Cruzeiro	Shakhtar	€7,000,000
2008-04-15	Tiago	Corinthians	Náutico	U
2008-04-26	Héverton	Corinthians	Vitória	L
2008-04-28	Edno	Noroeste	Portuguesa-SP	U
2008-05-16	Washington	Konyaspor	Portuguesa-SP	U
2008-04-24	Zé Maria	Portuguesa-SP	F Agent	R
2008-04-23	Osmar	Portuguesa-SP	Vila Nova	L
2008-04-23	Guilherme Cardoso	Cruzeiro	Vila Nova	L
2008-04-25	Juninho Goiano	Portuguesa-SP	F Agent	R
2008-04-10	Bruno Costa	Boavista-RJ	Botafogo	U
2008-04-18	Alexsandro	Resende	Botafogo	U
2008-05-01	Thiaguinho	Boavista-RJ	Botafogo	L
2008-03-19	Léo Medeiros	Flamengo	Atlético-PR	L
2008-04-14	Gustavo Nery	Fluminense	F Agent	R
2008-04-27	Landu	Itumbiara	Vasco	U
2008-04-18	Amaral	Vasco	Grêmio	L
2008-04-02	Andrade	Vasco	Cádiz	U
2008-05-06	Souza	Atlético Mineiro	F Agent	R
2008-02-17	Nenê	Cruzeiro	Ipatinga	L
2008-04-16	Javier Reina	América de Cali	Cruzeiro	$900,000
2008-05-03	Camilo	Marília	Cruzeiro	U
2008-04-14	Tiago	Bragantino	Ipatinga	F
2008-04-17	Ely Thadeu	Democrata-GV	Ipatinga	U
2008-05-05	Baroni	Ituiutaba	Ipatinga	F
2008-05-21	Pituca	Atlético-GO	Goiás	L
2008-05-04	Edimar	Tupi	Ipatinga	L
2008-05-01	Neto Baiano	Paulista	Ipatinga	L
2008-05-05	Renato	Guaratinguetá	Ipatinga	L
2008-05-21	Leandro Domingues	Cruzeiro	Vitória	L
2008-05-27	Weldon	Sporting Braga	Cruzeiro	LR
2008-05-05	Makelele	Cruzeiro	Grêmio	L
2008-04-26	Tcheco	Al-Ittihad	Grêmio	U
2008-04-08	Peter	Grêmio	Sport	L
2008-04-19	Leandrão	Chunnam Dragons	Internacional	U
2008-05-11	Hugo	Sertãozinho	Coritiba	LR
2008-04-16	Guaru	Toledo-PR	Coritiba	U
2008-05-06	Rodrigo Heffner	Santa Cruz-RS	Coritiba	U
2008-04-25	Willian	J. Malucelli	Coritiba	U
2008-04-11	Luisão	Juventus-SP	Náutico	U
2008-04-11	Assis	São Caetano	Náutico	U
2008-04-18	Alceu	Consadole Sapporo	Náutico	U
2008-05-09	Márcio Santos	Náutico	ABC	U
2008-04-24	Fumagalli	Al Rayyan	Sport	U
2008-05-06	Bruno	Ypiranga-PE	Sport	L
2008-05-06	Juninho	Sete de Septembro	Sport	U
2008-04-25	Cássio	Salgueiro	Sport	F
2008-05-19	Tadeu	Grêmio	Figueirense	L
2008-05-27	Evandro	Goiás	Palmeiras	L
2008-05-02	Muriqui	Madureira	Vitória	L
2008-05-02	Dinei	Guaratinguetá	Vitória	L
2008-05-02	Ticão	Náutico	Vitória	L
2008-05-27	Marcelo Cordeiro	Atlético Sorocaba	Vitória	U
2008-05-29	Nen	Palmeiras	Atlético Mineiro	U
2008-05-29	Denis	Santos	Corinthians	U
2008-05-29	Adriano Gabiru	Internacional	Goiás	L
2008-05-28	Abuda	Vasco	Avaí	L
2008-05-30	Márcio Goiano	Juventude	Sport	U
2008-05-19	Moraes	Santos	Ponte Preta	L
2008-05-25	Marcinho	Cruzeiro	Marília	L
2008-05-20	Anderson	Itumbiara	Vasco	U
2008-05-20	Roberto Júnior	Friburguense	Vasco	U
2008-05-19	Demerson	Cruzeiro	Ipatinga	L
2008-05-21	Abdullah Al Kamali	Al Wasl FC	Atlético-PR	U
2008-01-21	Paulinho	Maccabi Haifa	Ipatinga	U
2008-02-28	Gabriel	Hapoel Tel Aviv	Sport	L
2008-02-07	Du Lopes	Vitória	Mirassol	U
2008-01-16	Hugo Henrique	Vitória	Sergipe	F
2008-05-30	Rafael	Vasco	Bahia	U
2008-05-30	Robinho	Mogi Mirim	Santos	U
2008-05-30	Bruno Aguiar	Mirassol	Figueirense	U
2008-05-30	Leandro Eugênio	Noroeste	Figueirense	U
2008-01-09	Fábio Santos	Lyon	São Paulo	L
2008-01-24	Edson	Figueirense	F.C. Porto	€1,200,000
2008-06-02	Sérgio	Itumbiara	Portuguesa	F
2008-06-03	Gladstone	Cruzeiro	Palmeiras	L
2008-06-03	Márcio Azevedo	Juventude	Atlético-PR	L
2008-05-30	Rafael Lima	Ceará	Figueirense	LR
2008-07-10	Fábio Santos	São Paulo	Lyon	LR
2008-06-04	Marcus Vinícius	Vasco	Free Agent	R
2008-06-04	Xavier	Vasco	Maccabi Haifa	LR
2008-06-04	Vanderlei	Atlético Mineiro	Botafogo	L
2008-06-04	Lucas Silva	Dorados	Botafogo	L
2008-05-23	Alex Alves	Mirassol	Brasiliense	U
2008-05-02	Marcelinho	U.D. Leiria	Paraná	L
2008-05-09	Adriano Magrão	Atlético-GO	Gama	U
2008-05-08	Paulo Santos	Guarani	Náutico	U
2008-06-04	Beto	Criciúma	Atlético Mineiro	R$150,000
2008-06-03	Pedro Beda	Flamengo	Heerenveen	U
2008-06-05	Xaves	Atlético Mineiro	Ipatinga	U
2008-06-05	Diego Gavilán	Flamengo	Portuguesa	F
2008-06-04	Rafael Santos	Vitória	Atlético-PR	LR
2008-03-22	Castillo	Bolívar	Atlético-PR	L
2008-05-13	Calisto	Vasco	Atlético Mineiro	U
2008-05-16	Élton	América-RJ	Vasco	U
2008-05-27	Gerson	Atlético Mineiro	F Agent	R
2008-05-26	Ricardo Martinez	Atlético Mineiro	F Agent	R
2008-05-26	Sérvulo	Atlético Mineiro	F Agent	R
2008-05-26	Cláudio	Atlético Mineiro	F Agent	R
2008-05-26	Agustín Viana	Atlético Mineiro	F Agent	R
2008-04-09	Jajá	Guarani (MG)	Cruzeiro	LR
2008-05-23	João Victor	Cruzeiro	Marília	U
2008-05-23	Samuel	Cruzeiro	Marília	U
2008-06-05	Iarley	Internacional	Goiás	U
2008-05-28	Vítor	Goiás	Internacional	L
2008-05-06	Vítor Ramos	Vitória	Atlético-PR	U
2008-05-06	Gustavo	Vitória	Atlético-PR	U
2008-05-06	Willians Santana	Vitória	Atlético-PR	U
2008-05-06	Cleiton Domingues	Vitória	Atlético-PR	U
2008-05-06	Stefan	Vitória	Atlético-PR	U
2008-05-06	Lucas	Vitória	Atlético-PR	U
2008-05-13	Jean Carlo	Jataiense-GO	Atlético-PR	U
2008-05-13	Kaio	Guanabara	Atlético-PR	LR
2008-03-24	Léo Mineiro	Mirassol	Coritiba	U
2008-05-08	Ariel Nahuelpan	Nueva Chicago	Coritiba	U
2008-05-06	Michael	Guaratinguetá	Coritiba	U
2008-05-09	Alê	Guaratinguetá	Coritiba	U
2008-05-20	Alex Silva	Guaratinguetá	Coritiba	U
2008-05-30	Romerito	Sport	Goiás	LR
2008-05-05	Magal	Guaratinguetá	Figueirense	U
2008-05-13	Henrique Santos	Itumbiara	Goiás	U
2008-06-09	Thiago Gomes	Palmeiras	Vitória	L
2008-06-06	Gilmar	Yokohama Marinos	Náutico	U
2008-06-09	Frontini	CRB	Goiás	U
2008-06-10	Francis	Palmeiras	Atlético Mineiro	U
2008-06-10	Amaral	Palmeiras	Atlético Mineiro	U
2008-06-09	Ângelo	Paraná	Internacional	U
2008-06-12	João Henrique	Botafogo	Coritiba	U
2008-06-12	Carlinhos	Santos	Cruzeiro	L
2008-06-12	Apodi	Cruzeiro	Santos	L
2008-06-13	Moacir	Central-PE	Atlético-PR	L
2008-06-14	César Prates	Figueirense	Atlético Mineiro	U
2008-06-14	Elton	Figueirense	Atlético Mineiro	U
2008-06-14	Fernandão	Internacional	Al-Gharafa	R$3,500,000
2008-06-14	Ricardinho	Jeju United	Figueirense	U
2008-06-14	Matheus	Atlético-PR	Belenenses	U
2008-06-16	Roger	Botafogo	Retired	R
2008-06-17	Betão	Santos	Dynamo Kyiv	$2,500,000
2008-06-18	Danilo Portugal	Ipatinga	Vitória Setúbal	U
2008-06-19	Nenê	Ipatinga	Nacional	L
2008-06-19	Alex Dias	Goiás	Brasiliense	U
2008-06-18	Rodriguinho	Avaí	Atlético-PR	U
2008-06-18	Nádson	Samsung Bluewings	Vitória	F
2008-06-18	André Silva	Vitória	Gama	U
2008-06-19	Rafael Moura	Lorient	Atlético-PR	U
2008-06-18	Julio dos Santos	Grêmio	Atlético-PR	F
2008-06-24	Basílio	Tokyo Verdy	Ipatinga	U
2008-06-25	Peter	Sport	Criciúma	U
2008-06-23	Paulinho Dias	Cruzeiro	Ipatinga	L
2008-06-23	Júlio Santos	Portuguesa	Tours FC	U
2008-06-23	Michel Macedo	Flamengo	UD Almería	U
2008-06-25	Fabiano Eller	Atlético Madrid	Santos	U
2008-06-25	Maykon	Santo André	Santos	U
2008-06-26	Michael	Dynamo Kyiv	Santos	L
2008-06-27	Bolívar	AS Monaco	Internacional	L
2008-06-26	André Lima	Hertha Berlin	São Paulo	L
2008-06-24	Joélson	Porto-PE	Sport	U
2008-06-27	Lúcio Curió	CSP-PB	Sport	U
2008-01-01	Christian	Internacional	Portuguesa	F
2008-06-28	Christian	Portuguesa	Pachuca	F
2008-06-29	Henrique	Palmeiras	Barcelona	€10,000,000
2008-06-29	Douglas	Grêmio	Vitória Guimarães	U
2008-07-01	Eliézio	Cruzeiro	Nacional	L
2008-06-27	Marcinho	Cruzeiro	Kashima Antlers	L
2008-06-28	Luiz Fernando	Cruzeiro	Ipatinga	U
2008-06-30	Jeci	Coritiba	Palmeiras	U
2008-07-01	Leandro Carvalho	Itumbiara	Figueirense	U
2008-06-26	Roberto Brum	Braga	Santos	U
2008-07-01	Kelly	F Agent	Atlético-PR	U
2008-07-01	Coelho	Corinthians	Bologna	L
2008-07-02	Mariano	Ipatinga	Atlético Mineiro	U
2008-07-02	Marinho	Atlético Mineiro	Ipatinga	L
2008-07-02	Renato	Guaratinguetá	Figueirense	L
2008-07-02	Jackson	Guaratinguetá	Figueirense	L
2008-07-03	Abedi	Botafogo	Juventude	U
2008-07-03	Nelson Cuevas	Libertad	Santos	U
2008-06-14	Jardel	Cruzeiro	Estrela Amadora	U
2008-07-04	Rosinei	Murcia	Internacional	U
2008-07-04	Thiago Feltri	Atlético Mineiro	Goiás	L
2008-07-04	Ediglê	Marítimo	Portuguesa	U
2008-01-29	Eduardo	Botafogo	Náutico	U
2008-07-04	Roger	Grêmio	Qatar Sports	$5,000,000
2008-06-11	Kaio	Atlético-PR	Cerezo Osaka	L
2008-07-06	Leandro Zárate	Unión	Botafogo	U
2008-07-06	Gérson Magrão	Ipatinga	Cruzeiro	R$2,000,000
2008-07-07	Fabiano Gadelha	Pohang Steelers	Náutico	U
2008-02-29	César	Figueirense	Sport	U
2008-07-07	Rodrigo Arroz	Flamengo	Belenenses	U
2008-07-03	Edimar	Ipatinga	Braga	U
2008-07-03	Léo Silva	Cruzeiro	Ipatinga	L
2008-07-03	Sandro	Cruzeiro	Ipatinga	L
2008-07-07	Jonas	Grêmio	Portuguesa	L
2008-07-07	Fabiano	Itabaiana-SE	Santos	L
2008-07-08	Renato Augusto	Flamengo	Bayer Leverkusen	U
2008-07-07	Marcelo	Portuguesa	Belenenses	U
2008-07-09	Renatinho	Santos	Rentistas	F
2008-07-09	Souza	PSG	Grêmio	L
2008-07-09	Piauí	Atlético-PR	Náutico	L
2008-07-09	Diego	Vasco	Figueirense	F
2008-07-10	Vinícius Pacheco	Flamengo	Belenenses	L
2008-07-16	Anderson	Olympique Lyonnais	São Paulo	L
2008-07-16	Marcinho	Flamengo	Al-Jazira	U
2008-07-18	Danilinho	Atlético Mineiro	Jaguares	$4,000,000
2008-07-12	Lenílson	Jaguares	Atlético Mineiro	U
2008-07-11	Maicosuel	Cruzeiro	Palmeiras	F
2008-07-14	Cícero	Fluminense	Hertha Berlin	L
2008-07-14	Sergio Orteman	Racing Santander	Grêmio	U
2008-07-09	Gabriel	Fluminense	Panathinaikos	€1,300,000
2008-07-09	Gil	Internacional	Botafogo	L
2008-06-19	Léo Mineiro	Coritiba	Busan I'Park	F
2008-07-08	Evanildo	Pão de Açúcar-SP	Figueirense	L
2008-07-19	Andrés D'Alessandro	San Lorenzo	Internacional	U
2008-07-15	Danilo Silva	Guarani	Internacional	L
2008-07-20	Reasco	São Paulo	LDU	U
2008-07-22	Gustavo Nery	F Agent	Internacional	F
2008-07-22	Almir	Atlético Mineiro	F Agent	R
2008-07-21	João Paulo	Paraná	Goiás	L
2008-07-22	Fahel	Atlético-PR	Goiás	F
2008-07-22	Philippe Coutinho	Vasco	Internazionale	U
2008-07-23	Evaldo	Santos	Coritiba	F
2008-07-22	Rodrigo Tabata	Santos	Gaziantepspor	L
2008-07-21	Maurinho	Beira-Mar	Náutico	U
2008-07-18	Sidny	Livorno	Sport	L
2008-07-24	Pablo	Vasco	Real Zaragoza	€700,000
2008-07-19	Gerson	Atlético Mineiro	São Caetano	L
2008-07-24	Sidnei	Internacional	Benfica	€5,000,000
2008-07-24	Adaílton	Santos	F Agent	R
2008-07-24	Jael	Criciúma	Atlético Mineiro	U
2008-07-24	Elías Ricardo	Liverpool (URU)	Atlético Mineiro	U
2008-07-23	Renan	Atlético Mineiro	CA Osasuna	€1,500,000
2008-07-24	Everton Santos	PSG	Fluminense	U
2008-07-24	Marcinho Guerreiro	Santos	Real Murcia	U
2008-07-24	Daniel Carvalho	CSKA	Internacional	L
2008-07-23	Chiquinho	Internacional	Fortaleza	L
2008-07-24	Alvaro	Levante UD	Internacional	U
2008-07-24	Ricardo	Vasco	Internacional	U
2008-07-25	Deleu	Náutico	Ceará	U
2008-07-25	Fredson	Espanyol	Goiás	U
2008-07-25	Rodrigo Mendes	Grêmio	Al-Sharjah</ref>	$200,000
2008-07-24	Almir	F Agent	Ulsan Hyundai	F
2008-07-24	Jancarlos	São Paulo	Fluminense	U
2008-07-25	Eduardo Ratinho	Toulouse	Fluminense	U
2008-07-12	Anderson Aquino	Goiás	Atlético-PR	LR
2008-07-26	Souza	Flamengo	Panathinaikos	€3,000,000
2008-07-29	Wanderley	Ponte Preta	Cruzeiro	U
2008-07-29	Reinaldo	Nacional	Náutico	U
2008-07-29	William	Palmeiras	Náutico	U
2008-07-29	Vanderlei	Botafogo	Leiria	F
2008-07-28	Eltinho	Cruzeiro	Flamengo	U
2008-07-28	Vandinho	Avaí	Flamengo	U
2008-07-28	Everton	Paraná	Flamengo	U
2008-04-10	Luizão	Juventus-SP	Náutico	U
2008-07-30	Nunes	Grêmio	Guarani	U
2008-07-30	Bruno Teles	Grêmio	Portuguesa	L
2008-07-30	Jaílson	Braga	Coritiba	U
2008-07-30	Dori	Fluminense	GIF Sundsvall	L
2008-07-30	Caio	Fluminense	GIF Sundsvall	L
2008-08-01	Fellype Gabriel	Nacional	Portuguesa	U
2008-07-22	Ricardinho	Vasco	Zamalek	F
2008-06-30	Alemão	Santos	Udinese	U
2008-08-02	Patricio Urrutia	LDU Quito	Fluminense	U
2008-08-02	Anderson Gomes	Marítimo	Goiás	U
2008-08-05	Alex	Goiás	Juventude	L
2008-08-06	Luiz Carlos	Ceará	Internacional	U
2008-08-04	Marcelo Costa	Ipatinga	Juventude	U
2008-08-05	Ferreira	Ulsan Hyundai	Ipatinga	U
2008-08-05	Igor	Pontevedra	Ipatinga	U
2008-08-06	Osmar	Palmeiras	Vitória	U
2008-08-07	Ralf	Noroeste	Vasco	U
2008-08-07	Leandro Carrijo	Atlético Mineiro	Vitória Setúbal	U
2008-08-07	Wellington	Náutico	Hoffenheim	U
2008-08-07	Egídio	Flamengo	Juventude	L
2008-08-06	Gleguer	Bragantino	Vitória	L
2008-08-08	Júlio César	F Agent	Santos	F
2008-08-08	Wilson	Genoa	Sport	L
2008-08-08	Gomes	MLS (Colorado)	Figueirense	U
2008-08-09	Marcelinho Paraíba	Wolfsburg	Flamengo	F
2008-08-12	Wendel	Palmeiras	Santos	L
2008-08-11	Bida	Vitória	Santos	L
2008-08-12	Renan	Internacional	Valencia	£3,000,000
2008-08-12	Roger	Guarani	Figueirense	U
2008-08-12	Jairo	Palmeiras	Figueirense	U
2008-08-11	Gustavo	Sport	Vasco	U
2008-08-14	Rubens Sambueza	River Plate	Flamengo	L
2008-08-13	Fernando Santos	MSV Duisburg	Vasco	U
2008-08-13	André	Macaé	Vasco	L
2008-08-14	Serginho	Ituano	Vasco	L
2008-08-14	Allan	Sport	Vasco	U
2008-08-13	Morais	Vasco	Corinthians	L
2008-08-25	Márcio Careca	Grêmio Barueri	Vasco	R$400,000
2008-08-17	Jorge Valdivia	Palmeiras	Al Ain	U
2008-07-12	Vanderlei	Botafogo	Brasiliense	U
2008-08-19	Fernandinho	Mixto	Flamengo	L
2008-08-19	Josiel	Al-Wahda	Flamengo	R$2,000,000
2008-08-19	Fernandão	Maccabi Haifa	Flamengo	L
2008-08-21	Éverton	Paraná	Flamengo	L
2008-08-19	Danilo Rios	Vitória	Atlético Mineiro	L
2008-08-21	Dinélson	Corinthians	Coritiba	F
2008-08-21	Lima	Corinthians	Atlético-PR	U
2008-08-13	Wellington	Mainz	Náutico	U
2008-08-14	Valdeir	Criciúma	Náutico	U
2008-08-12	Hamílton	Ankaraspor	Náutico	U
2008-08-16	Eanes	Naval	Náutico	U
2008-08-16	Clodoaldo	Pohang Steelers	Náutico	U
2008-08-26	Gonzalo Fierro	Colo-Colo	Flamengo	U
2008-08-23	Mariano Trípodi	Santos	Vitória	L
2008-08-21	Lauro	Cruzeiro	Internacional	R$700,000
2008-08-21	Héverton	Vitória	Portuguesa	U
2008-08-29	Alex Silva	São Paulo	Hamburger SV	U
2008-08-28	Renan	Atlético Mineiro	Celta	L
2008-08-28	Caiuby	São Paulo	VfL Wolfsburg	U
2008-08-27	Paulo Almeida	Náutico	ABC	F
2008-08-29	Thiago Neves	Fluminense	Hamburger SV	€9,000,000
2008-08-31	Eduardo Costa	Grêmio	Lecce	U
2008-08-29	Charles	Cruzeiro	Lokomotiv Moscow	R$11,900,000
2008-09-01	Edcarlos	Benfica	Fluminense	L
2008-08-21	Léo	Internacional	Lecce	L
2008-08-29	Cadu	Coritiba	Marítimo	L
2008-08-28	Luizão	Vasco	FC Bunyodkor	U
2008-08-21	Dinei	Atlético-PR	Celta	L
2008-01-23	Darley	Atlético Mineiro	Feyenoord	U
2008-08-22	Diogo	Portuguesa	Olympiacos	€9,000,000
2008-08-19	Andrade	Cádiz CF	Sport	U
2008-08-30	Fábio Santos	AS Monaco	Santos	U
2008-08-30	Pará	Santo André	Santos	U
2008-08-30	Kerlon	Cruzeiro	Chievo	€1,300,000
2008-08-30	Jonathas	Cruzeiro	AZ Alkmaar	€600,000
2008-08-30	Juan Pablo Sorín	Hamburger SV	Cruzeiro	F
2008-09-01	Richard Morales	Nacional	Grêmio	L
2008-09-01	Marcelo	Santos	Wisła Kraków	F
2008-08-29	Aloísio	São Paulo	Al-Rayyan	$1,000,000
2008-08-29	Thiago Ribeiro	Al-Rayyan	Cruzeiro	U
2008-08-30	Pablo Escobar	The Strongest	Ipatinga	L
2008-08-27	Gledson	Santa Cruz	Náutico	U
2008-08-27	Anderson Santana	Linhares	Náutico	U
2008-08-21	Adriano Pimenta	Bragantino	Náutico	U
2008-08-20	Eduardo	Atlético Mineiro	Gaziantepspor	L
2008-06-11	Júnior	Vasco	Arsenal Kyiv	€4,000,000
2008-04-02	Luis Escalada	Botafogo	Gimnasia Jujuy	F
2008-08-15	Neto Baiano	Ipatinga	Ponte Preta	F
2008-07-08	Bolívia	Atlético-PR	Naval	F
2008-09-02	Bilú	F Agent	Coritiba	F
2008-09-02	Fausto	Linense	Goiás	F
2008-09-02	Cristian	Flamengo	Corinthians	U
2008-09-02	Pedrinho	Al Ain	Vasco	F
2008-09-02	Johnny	CRB	Vasco	U
2008-09-03	Schwenck	Goiás	Juventude	U
2008-08-26	Rodrigo Sá	Americano	Botafogo	U
2008-09-03	Piauí	Náutico	ABC	L
2008-09-05	Diogo	Sport	Corinthians	U
2008-09-04	Marco Túlio (footballer, born 1981)	Ethnikos	Atlético-PR	L
2008-09-04	Toninho	Ipatinga	Náutico	U
2008-09-05	Derley	Internacional	Náutico	L
2008-09-05	Titi	Internacional	Náutico	L
2008-09-08	João Leonardo	Atlético-PR	Juventude	U
2008-09-08	Jean Carlos	Vasco	Sharjah FC	R$18,000,000
2008-09-08	Vinícius	Figueirense	São Caetano	U
2008-09-08	Ciel	Ceará	Fluminense	U
2008-09-10	Athirson	Brasiliense	Portuguesa	U
2008-09-10	Gustavo	Sport	Atlético-PR	U
2008-09-09	Radamés	Náutico	Al-Jazira Club	U
2008-09-09	Leandro Soares	Figueirense	Criciúma	U
2008-09-08	Rafael Vaz	Palmeiras	Bahia	U
2008-09-11	Christian	C.F. Pachuca	Portuguesa	U
2008-09-12	Maurinho	São Paulo	Cruzeiro	U
2008-09-12	Wellington Monteiro	Internacional	Fluminense	U
2008-09-11	Paulo Rodrigues	Boavista	Atlético Mineiro	U
2008-09-11	Caju	Corinthians	Náutico	U
2008-09-11	Eliomar	Indios	Náutico	U
2008-09-11	Cristiano	Juventude	Náutico	U
2008-09-17	Roque Júnior	Al-Rayyan	Palmeiras	L
2008-09-16	Maurico Pinilla	Racing Santander	Vasco	U
2008-08-20	Daniel Henz	Internacional	Rio Ave	U
2008-09-14	Robert	Marília	Vitória	U
2008-09-16	Odvan	Ituano	Vasco	U
2008-09-17	Alex	São Paulo	Figueirense	L
2008-09-17	Baiano	Rubin Kazan	Vasco	F
2008-09-18	Apodi	Cruzeiro	São Caetano	F
2008-09-18	Patrick	Brasiliense	Fluminense	U
2008-09-18	Elias	Bahia	Fluminense	U
2008-09-18	Peter	Ituano	Figueirense	U
2008-09-18	Alex Cazumba	São Paulo	Figueirense	U
2008-09-18	Lima	Corinthians	Figueirense	U
2008-09-18	Júlio	Noroeste	Ipatinga	U
2008-09-18	Gilsinho	Noroeste	Ipatinga	U
2008-09-14	Sidnei	Portuguesa	Criciúma	U
2008-09-18	Rinaldo	Goiás	Fortaleza	U
2008-09-17	Cláudio	Palmeiras	Marília	F
2008-09-18	Reginaldo	Sport	Santos	U
2008-09-22	Fabrício Carvalho	Goiás	Portuguesa	L
2008-09-19	Éverton	Sport	ABC	U
2008-09-19	Leandro Viera	Portuguesa Santista	Goiás	L
2008-09-19	Raphael Luz	São Paulo	Goiás	L
2008-09-18	Basílio	Ipatinga	Grêmio Barueri</ref>	U
