= 2007 CR Vasco da Gama season =

Vasco da Gama
2007 season
- Chairman: Eurico Miranda
- Manager: Renato Gaúcho (until 13 April); Celso Roth (16 April–22 October); Valdir Espinosa (from 25 October)
- Stadium: São Januário; Maracanã
- Campeonato Brasileiro Série A: 10th
- Copa do Brasil: Round of 32
- Campeonato Carioca: 4th Guanabara Tournament: Semifinals; Rio de Janeiro Tournament: Semifinals
- Copa Sudamericana: Quarterfinals
- Top goalscorer: League: Leandro Amaral (14); All: Leandro Amaral (30)
Home colours	Away colours

The 2007 season was Club de Regatas Vasco da Gama's 109th year in existence, the club's 92nd season in existence of football, and the club's 39th season playing in the Campeonato Brasileiro Série A, the top flight of Brazilian football.

== Players ==
=== Squad information ===
As of 31 December 2007

No.	Name	Nationality	Position(s)	Date of birth (age)	Signed from
Goalkeepers
12	Cássio	(Brazil)	GK	12 August 1980 (aged 27)	(Brazil) America (RJ)
1	Silvio Luiz	(Brazil)	GK	1 March 1977 (aged 30)	(Brazil) Corinthians (on loan from São Caetano)
	Roberto	(Brazil)	GK	1 July 1979 (aged 28)	(Brazil) Criciúma
Defenders
2	Wagner Diniz	(Brazil)	RB / RW	21 September 1983 (aged 24)	(Brazil) Treze
13	Eduardo	(Brazil)	RB / RWM	20 November 1986 (aged 21)	(Brazil) CRB
	Thiago Maciel	(Brazil)	RB	7 August 1982 (aged 25)	(Russia) Alania Vladikavkaz (on loan)
3	Jorge Luiz	(Brazil)	CB	22 April 1982 (aged 25)	(Brazil) Internacional
4	Vilson	(Brazil)	CB / DMF	3 April 1989 (aged 18)	(Brazil) Madureira
5	Júlio Santos	(Brazil)	CB	12 December 1981 (aged 26)	(Brazil) Goiás
22	Luizão (on loan from Luzern)	(Brazil)	CB / RB	3 January 1987 (aged 20)	(Brazil) Cruzeiro
23	Emiliano Dudar	(Argentina)	CB	12 August 1981 (aged 26)	(Argentina) Tigre
	Gustavo Breda	(Brazil)	CB	2 May 1986 (aged 21)	Youth system
6	Rubens Júnior	(Brazil)	LB	8 January 1975 (aged 32)	(Brazil) Corinthians
14	Guilherme Santos	(Brazil)	LB	5 February 1988 (aged 19)	Youth system
Midfielders
9	Amaral	(Brazil)	DMF	24 November 1983 (aged 24)	(Brazil) Paulista
15	Perdigão	(Brazil)	CMF	28 June 1977 (aged 30)	(Brazil) Internacional
16	Andrade	(Brazil)	CMF / DMF	13 October 1981 (aged 26)	(Portugal) Braga
24	Xavier (on loan from Maccabi Haifa)	(Brazil)	CMF / DMF	22 January 1980 (aged 27)	(Israel) Maccabi Haifa
17	Roberto Lopes	(Brazil)	DMF	16 August 1983 (aged 24)	(Brazil) Madureira
	Thiaguinho (on loan from Boavista)	(Brazil)	CMF / RWM	14 June 1985 (aged 22)	(Brazil) Boavista
	Júnior	(Brazil)	DMF / CMF	28 February 1986 (aged 21)	(Portugal) Estrela da Amadora (on loan)
8	Darío Conca (on loan from River Plate)	(Argentina)	AMF	11 May 1983 (aged 24)	(Argentina) Rosario Central (on loan from River Plate)
25	Leandro Bonfim	(Brazil)	AMF / CMF / RWM	8 January 1984 (aged 23)	(Portugal) Nacional da Madeira (on loan from Porto)
18	Marcelinho (on loan from Confiança)	(Brazil)	AMF / SS / LW	9 March 1981 (aged 26)	(Brazil) Confiança
10	Morais	(Brazil)	AMF	17 July 1984 (aged 23)	(Brazil) Atlético Paranaense (on loan)
	Rafael	(Brazil)	CMF / DMF / AMF	21 May 1984 (aged 23)	(Brazil) Olaria
	Ernane	(Brazil)	AMF / SS	2 May 1985 (aged 22)	(Brazil) Bahia
Forwards
19	Leandro Amaral	(Brazil)	AT	6 August 1977 (aged 30)	(Brazil) Portuguesa
7	Alan Kardec	(Brazil)	ST	12 January 1989 (aged 18)	Youth system
11	Romário	(Brazil)	ST	29 January 1966 (aged 41)	(Australia) Adelaide United
21	Abuda	(Brazil)	SS / LW / RW	28 March 1986 (aged 21)	(Belgium) Beerschot
20	Enílton (on loan from Palmeiras)	(Brazil)	ST / SS	11 October 1977 (aged 30)	(Japan) Omiya Ardija (on loan from Palmeiras)
	Martín García	(Colombia)	ST	2 March 1981 (aged 26)	(Brazil) São Caetano

=== Transfers ===
==== In ====
Note: Flags indicate national team as defined under FIFA eligibility rules; some limited exceptions apply. Players may hold more than one non-FIFA nationality. Squad correct as of December 31, 2007.

No.	Pos.	Nation	Player
—	FW	BRA	Alessandro (loan transfer from Tombense in December 2006 at April)
—	MF	BRA	Elias (loan transfer from Bahia in December 2006 at April)
—	MF	ARG	Darío Conca (loan transfer from River Plate in December 2006 at December)
—	FW	BRA	André Dias (loan transfer from Iraty in December 2006 at June)
—	FW	BRA	Marcelo de Faria (loan transfer from AC Ajaccio in December 2006 at April)
—	DF	BRA	Eduardo (transfer from CRB in December 2006)
—	MF	BRA	Renato (loan transfer from Atlético Mineiro in January at July)
—	DF	BRA	Júlio Santos (transfer from Goiás in January)
—	FW	BRA	Romário (free transfer from Adelaide United in January)
—	MF	BRA	Fábio Neves (loan transfer from Villa Rio in February at August)
—	DF	BRA	Rubens Júnior (free transfer from Sport Club Corinthians Paulista in March)
—	DF	BRA	Breno (loan transfer from Náutico in April at July)
—	MF	BRA	Thiaguinho (loan transfer from Boavista in April at December)
—	FW	BRA	Anselmo (free transfer from Boavista in April)
—	GK	BRA	Silvio Luiz (free transfer from São Caetano in April)
—	FW	COL	Martín Edwin García (free transfer from São Caetano in May)
—	MF	BRA	Perdigão (free transfer from Internacional in June)
—	FW	BRA	Abuda (free transfer from Beerschot in June)
—	FW	BRA	Enílton (loan transfer from Palmeiras in July at December)
—	MF	BRA	Andrade (free transfer from S.C. Braga in July)
—	MF	BRA	Xavier (loan transfer from Maccabi Haifa in July at December)
—	DF	BRA	Luizão (loan transfer from FC Luzern in August at August 2008)
—	MF	BRA	Leandro Bonfim (free transfer from Nacional da Madeira in August)
—	MF	BRA	Júnior (loan return from Estrela da Amadora in August)

===== from Youth system =====
Note: Flags indicate national team as defined under FIFA eligibility rules; some limited exceptions apply. Players may hold more than one non-FIFA nationality. Squad correct as of December 31, 2007.

No.	Pos.	Nation	Player
—	DF	BRA	Gustavo Breda (promoted in January)
—	DF	BRA	Guilherme Santos (promoted in April)
—	FW	BRA	Alan Kardec (promoted in April)
—	DF	BRA	Vilson (promoted in June)

==== Out ====
Note: Flags indicate national team as defined under FIFA eligibility rules; some limited exceptions apply. Players may hold more than one non-FIFA nationality. Squad correct as of December 31, 2007.

No.	Pos.	Nation	Player
—	MF	BRA	Ramon (end of contract, free transfer to Al-Gharafa in December 2006)
—	FW	BRA	Jean (end of loan from Saturn Ramenskoye in December 2006)
—	DF	BRA	Claudemir (loan transfer to Madureira in January at May, loan transfer to Marília in May at December)
—	FW	BRA	Valdiram (loan transfer to Itumbiara in February at May, free transfer to Ituano in June)
—	MF	BRA	Ygor (transfer to IK Start in February)
—	DF	BRA	Diego (loan transfer to Goiás in March at December)
—	FW	BRA	Faioli (loan transfer to Madureira in March at May, loan transfer to Vitória in May at December)
—	MF	BRA	Ives (loan transfer to Náutico in April at June, loan transfer to Ituano in June at September, free transfer to Grande Rio Bréscia Clube in September)
—	DF	BRA	Anderson Luiz (free transfer to Duque de Caxias in April)
—	FW	BRA	Marcelo de Faria (end of loan from Ajaccio in April)
—	FW	BRA	Alessandro (end of loan from Tombense in April)
—	MF	BRA	Elias (end of loan from Bahia in April)
—	MF	BRA	Coutinho (loan transfer to Ipatinga in May at August, transfer to Tombense in August)
—	MF	BRA	Madson (loan transfer to Duque de Caxias in June at December)
—	FW	BRA	André Dias (end of loan from Iraty in June)
—	MF	BRA	Abedi (transfer to Hapoel Tel Aviv in June)
—	DF	BRA	Breno (end of loan from Náutico in July)
—	FW	BRA	Anselmo (free transfer to Avaí in July)
—	MF	BRA	Renato (end of loan from Atlético Mineiro in July)
—	DF	BRA	Sandro (end of loan from Vitória in August)
—	MF	BRA	Fábio Neves (end of loan from Villa Rio in August)
—	DF	BRA	Fábio Braz (free transfer to Corinthians in September)

== Competitions ==
=== Squad appearances and goals ===
Last updated on 2 December 2007.

No.	Pos	Nat	Player	Total		Campeonato Brasileiro Série A		Copa do Brasil		Campeonato Carioca		Other (Note: Includes appearances in Copa Sudamericana friendlies.)	
No.	Pos	Nat	Player	Apps	Goals	Apps	Goals	Apps	Goals	Apps	Goals	Apps	Goals
Goalkeepers
Defenders
Midfielders
Forwards
