= Breda (disambiguation) =

Breda is a city in the southern Netherlands.

Breda may also refer to the following:

== Places ==
- Breda, Spain, a village in Catalonia
- Breda, Iowa, a small city in the United States
- Breda di Piave, a commune in the Treviso province, Italy
- Breda, County Down, a townland in County Down, Northern Ireland
- Bréda, a small river in eastern France, tributary of the Isère

== People ==
- Breda (name), a list of people with the given name or surname
- Gustavo Breda (born 1986), Brazilian footballer sometimes known simply as Breda

== Other uses ==
- Breda (spider), a genus of jumping spiders
- Breda Academy, a secondary school in Belfast, Northern Ireland
- Breda machine gun (disambiguation), a number of machine guns
- Breda Royal Beer, generally known as simply Breda, a Dutch lager sold almost exclusively in the Channel Islands
- HMS Breda, various British warships
- NAC Breda, a football club based in Breda, Netherlands
- Società Italiana Ernesto Breda, aka Breda Costruzioni Ferroviarie or simply Breda, an Italian industrial manufacturer
- SS Breda, a Dutch cargo ship sunk in 1940

== See also ==
- Van Breda, a list of people with the surname
