= Alexsandro =

Male given name

Alexsandro, a form of Alexandro, is a male given name. It may refer to:

- Alex Fernandes (born 1973), Alexsandro Fernandes Xavier, Brazilian football striker
- Alex (footballer, born 1977), Alexsandro de Souza, Brazilian football attacking midfielder
- Alex Oliveira (footballer, born 1978) (born 1978), Alexsandro Marques de Oliveira, Brazilian football defender
- Alexsandro (footballer, born 1980), Alexsandro Ribeiro da Silva, Brazilian football forward
- Sandro (footballer, born 1981), Alexsandro Oliveira Duarte, Brazilian football attacking midfielder
- Alex Maranhão (born 1985), Alexsandro Carvalho Lopes, Brazilian football midfielder
- Alex Ferreira (footballer) (born 1986), Alexsandro Ferreira, Brazilian football right-back
- Alex Pereira (born 1987), Brazilian mixed martial artist and kickboxer
- Alexsandro Melo (born 1995), Brazilian long jumper
- Alexsandro (footballer, born 1997), Alexsandro dos Santos Ferreira, Brazilian football forward
- Alexsandro (footballer, born 1999), Alexsandro Victor de Souza Ribeiro, Brazilian football centre-back

== See also ==
- Alex Sandro (born 1991), Alex Sandro Lobo da Silva, Brazilian football left-back
- Alex Sandro (footballer, born 1995), Alex Sandro de Oliveira, Brazilian forward
