= Marcelo Oliveira (disambiguation) =

Marcelo Oliveira (born 1955) is a Brazilian footballer and manager.

Marcelo Oliveira may refer to:

- Marcelo Oliveira (footballer, born 1981), Brazilian football defender
- Marcelo Oliveira (footballer, born 1987), Brazilian football defender
- Marcelinho (footballer, born 1981), full name Marcelo Santos Oliveira, Brazilian footballer
