= Gadelha =

Gadelha is a Portuguese surname that may refer to the following people:

- Cláudia Gadelha (born 1988), Brazilian mixed martial artist
- Fabiano Gadelha (born 1979), Brazilian football midfielder
- Breno Silva (Breno Gadelha Silva, born 1986), Brazilian football midfielder
