= Antonio Pinto =

Antonio Pinto may refer to:

- António Pinto Soares (1780–1865), Costa Rican politician
- Antonio Pinto Durán (fl. 1910s), Chilean politician
- António Marinho e Pinto (born 1950), Portuguese lawyer and former journalist
- António Costa Pinto (born 1953), Portuguese professor of politics and history
- António Pinto (runner) (born 1966), Portuguese long-distance runner
- Antônio Pinto (composer) (born 1967), Brazilian composer of film music
- Antonio Augusto Ferreira Pinto Júnior (born 1986), Brazilian defensive midfielder

== See also ==
- Antonio Vico y Pintos (1840–1940), Spanish stage actor
- Pinto, a list of people whose given name or surname is Pinto
- Pinto (disambiguation)
