= Breda (name) =

- Pronunciation: English: /briːdə/ French: [bʁeda] Dutch: [breˈdaː] German: [ˈbʁeːda] Italian: [ˈbrɛːda] Czech: [ˈbrɛda]

Breda is a given name and a surname. Notable people with the name Breda or Bréda include:

== Surname ==
- Carl Frederik von Breda (1759–1818), Swedish painter
- David Breda (footballer, born 1971), Czech footballer
- David Breda (footballer, born 1996), Czech footballer
- François Bréda (1956–2018), Romanian essayist, poet and literary critic
- Giovanni Battista Breda (1931–1992), Italian fencer
- Lurdes Breda (born 1970), Portuguese writer
- Roberto Breda (born 1969), Italian football player and coach
- Toussaint Louverture (1743–1803), also known as Toussaint Bréda, leader of the Haitian Revolution
- William Breda (1927–2004), American baseball player

== Given name ==
- Breda Beban (1952–2012), Serbian filmmaker and artist
- Breda O'Brien (born 1962), Irish teacher and newspaper columnist
- Breda Pergar (1953-1989), Yugoslav distance runner
- Breda Smolnikar (born 1941), Slovene writer

== See also ==
- Van Breda, a surname
- Società Italiana Ernesto Breda, an Italian manufacturing company
