= Sérvulo =

Sérvulo is a given name. Notable people with the name include:

- Sérvulo Gutiérrez (1914–1961), Peruvian artist
- Sérvulo (footballer) (born 1985), Brazilian footballer
