= Nego =

Nego may refer to:

- Erica Nego (born 1984), Ghanaian beauty queen and model
- Loïc Négo (born 1991), Hungarian footballer
- Nego (historian), Romanian literary historian Ion Negoițescu (1921-1993)
- Nêgo (footballer), Brazilian footballer Lindenbergh Francisco da Silva (born 1985)
- Nego do Borel, Brazilian funk musician Leno Maycon Viana Gomes (born 1992)
