= Ricardo Martinez =

Ricardo Martinez may refer to:

- Ricardo Martínez de Hoyos (1918-2009), Mexican painter
- Ricardo Martínez (footballer, born 1947), Salvadoran football midfielder
- Ricardo S. Martinez (born 1951), U.S. federal judge
- Ricardo Martínez Menanteau (born 1960), Chilean army general
- Ricardo Martínez Matey (born 1964), Spanish cyclist
- Ricardo Martínez (footballer, born 1980), Mexican football midfielder
- Ricardo Martínez (footballer, born 1984), Paraguayan football centre-back
