= Alexandre Faioli =

Brazilian footballer (born 1983)

Personal information
- Date of birth: 22 November 1983 (age 42)
- Place of birth: Vila Velha, Brazil
- Height: 1.78 m (5 ft 10 in)
- Position: Winger

Youth career
- 2002: Desportiva (ES)

Senior career*
Years	Team	Apps	(Gls)
2002	Palmeiras B	0	(0)
2003–2005	Serra	6	(0)
2006	Americano	0	(0)
2006–2009	Vasco	23	(3)
2007	→ Madureira (loan)	0	(0)
2007	→ Vitória EC (loan)	14	(3)
2008	→ Boavista SC (loan)	0	(0)
2009–2010	Leixões	8	(0)
2010	Duque de Caxias	0	(0)
- * Club domestic league appearances and goals

Alexandre Faioli (born 22 November 1983) is a former Brazilian footballer.

== Biography ==
Born in Vila Velha, Espírito Santo state, Faioli started his career at Desportiva Capixaba. After a brief spells with Palmeiras B, he returned to Espírito Santo and winning the league of the state 3 times, with Serra FC. He also played in national level (Campeonato Brasileiro Série C) in 2005 season.

In November 2005, he was signed by Americano in 2-year contract.

=== Vasco ===
In April 2006, he was signed by club of Rio de Janeiro – Vasco in 3-year deal. After a handful appearances, he was loaned to Madureira, another team from the city of RJ in March 2007. In May, he left for Vitória of Bahia state. He left for Boavista SC along with Roberto Lopes to play at 2008 League of Rio de Janeiro state before returned to Vasco in 2008. He only played once for Vasco at Campeonato Brasileiro Série A that season, which Vasco relegated to Série B.

In the 2009 season, he played a few games for the team at 2009 League of Rio de Janeiro state and signed a new deal until end of season in May. but in July left for Portuguese Primeira Liga side Leixões.

=== Leixões & Duque de Caxias ===
With Leixões he played 8 league matches at 2009–10 Primeira Liga. After he played a Taça da Liga match in January 2010, he returned to Rio de Janeiro for Duque de Caxias in a 3-month contract.

== Career statistics ==
Club performance			League		Cup		League Cup		Continental		Total	
Season	Club	League	Apps	Goals	Apps	Goals	Apps	Goals	Apps	Goals	Apps	Goals
Brazil			League		Copa do Brasil		League Cup		South America		Total	
2002	Palmeiras B	Nil									?	?^{1}
2003	Serra	Nil									?	?^{2}
2004	Serra	Série C	0	0							?	?^{2}
2005	Serra	Série C	6	0	2	0					?	?^{2}
2006	Americano	Nil			2	0					?	?^{3}
2006	Vasco	Série A	22	3					1	0	23	0
2007	Madureira	Nil			Nil^{4}						?	?^{3}
2007	Vitória	Série B	14	3							14	3
2008	Boavista SC	Nil									?	?^{3}
2008	Vasco	Série A	1	0							1	0
2009	Vasco	Série B	0	0	2	0					9	2^{5}
Portugal			League		Taça de Portugal		Taça da Liga		Europe		Total	
2009–10	Leixões	Primeira Liga	8	0	1	0	1	0			10	0
Brazil			League		Copa do Brasil		League Cup		South America		Total	
2010	Duque de Caxias	Nil									9	1^{6}
Total	Brazil		43	6	6	0			1	0	?	?^{7}
Total	Portugal		8	0	1	0	1	0			10	0
Career total			51	6	7	0	1	0	1	0	?	?^{7}

^{1} No stats. available for Campeonato Paulista Série A3
^{2} No stats. available for Campeonato Capixaba
^{3} No stats. available for Campeonato Carioca
^{4} He joined the team after the team eliminated from 2007 Copa do Brasil
^{5} 9 games and 2 goals in 2009 Campeonato Carioca
^{6} 9 games and 1 goal in 2010 Campeonato Carioca
^{7} See note 1 to 6 (except 4)

== Honours ==
- Espírito Santo State League: 2003, 2004, 2005
