= Wagner Carioca =

Brazilian footballer

Personal information
- Full name: Wagner Corrêa Machado
- Date of birth: March 24, 1987 (age 39)
- Place of birth: Macaé, Brazil
- Height: 1.81 m (5 ft 11 in)
- Position: Midfielder

Team information
- Current team: Duque de Caxias

Senior career*
Years	Team	Apps	(Gls)
2006	Bangu	0	(0)
2007–2010	Madureira	3	(0)
2007	→ Figueirense (loan)	4	(0)
2010–2011	Cabofriense	12	(1)
2012	Macaé	33	(1)
2013	Mogi Mirim	21	(4)
2013	São Caetano	24	(4)
2014–2015	Tombense	1	(0)
2014	→ Atlético Goianiense (loan)	19	(0)
2015–2017	Macaé	19	(1)
2016	→ Port (loan)	0	(0)
2017	Atlético Itapemirim	10	(0)
2018	Resende	10	(1)
2018–2020	Macaé	25	(1)
2020	Audax Rio	15	(3)
2020	Carapebus	7	(1)
2021	Macaé	9	(2)
2021–	Duque de Caxias	4	(1)
- * Club domestic league appearances and goals

Wagner Corrêa Machado (born March 24, 1987, in Macaé), known as Wagner Carioca, is a Brazilian midfielder. He currently plays for Duque de Caxias.

== Honours ==
- Rio de Janeiro's Cup: 2006

== Contract ==
- Madureira 5 July 2005 to 5 July 2010
