= Jorge Luiz (footballer, born 1982) =

Brazilian footballer

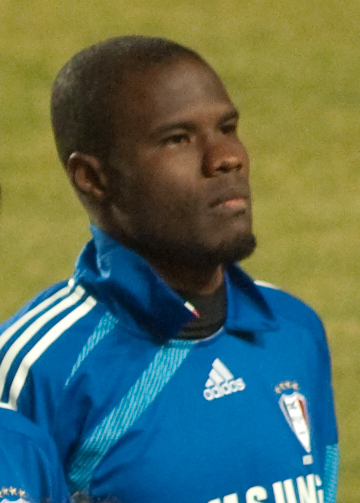

Personal information
- Full name: Jorge Luiz Alves Justino
- Date of birth: April 22, 1982 (age 44)
- Place of birth: Rio de Janeiro, Brazil
- Height: 1.85 m (6 ft 1 in)
- Position: Central defender

Team information
- Current team: Tombense

Youth career
- 2002: Friburguense
- 2002–2003: Rodoviario-RJ

Senior career*
Years	Team	Apps	(Gls)
2004	Confiança		
2005	América-RJ		
2005	Angra dos Reis		
2005	Internacional		
2006–2008	Vasco	117	(5)
2009–2011	Villa Rio		
2009	→ Suwon (Loan)	4	(0)
2009	→ Atlético Mineiro (Loan)	9	(0)
2010	→ Ceará (Loan)	2	(0)
2010–2011	→ Americana (Loan)	11	(0)
2011	Guaratinguetá	48	(0)
2012	São Caetano	14	(0)
2012–2013	Vitória Setúbal	33	(0)
2014	Guarani-SP	31	(0)
2014–2015	Mirassol	16	(0)
2015–2016	Linense	29	(1)
2016–	Tombense	0	(0)
- * Club domestic league appearances and goals as of 24 May 2016

Jorge Luiz Alves Justino or simply Jorge Luiz (born April 22, 1982 in Rio de Janeiro), is a Brazilian central defender who currently plays for Tombense.

== Career ==
On 23 January 2009 the defender left F.C. Paços de Ferreira in Portugal, signing for them just two days ago. The player has moved to South Korean team Suwon Samsung Bluewings and signed a one-year contract. The Portuguese team are likely to sue the player.
