= Alex Alcântara =

Brazilian footballer (born 1995)

Personal information
- Full name: Alex Augusto Pereira de Alcântara
- Date of birth: 28 April 1995 (age 31)
- Place of birth: São Paulo, Brazil
- Height: 1.82 m (6 ft 0 in)
- Position: Forward

Team information
- Current team: Duque de Caxias

Youth career
- –2013: Corinthians
- 2014: Flamengo
- 2014: Rio Branco-SP

Senior career*
Years	Team	Apps	(Gls)
2015	Vila Nova	0	(0)
2015–2017	Braga B	16	(0)
2017	Iporá	3	(0)
2017	Duque de Caxias	20	(7)
2018	São Paulo-RS	1	(0)
2018	Gurupi	0	(0)
2019	Rio Branco	3	(1)
2019	Operário-MT	5	(0)
2019	Rio São Paulo	13	(8)
2019	→ São Borja (loan)	4	(1)
2019–2020	Vila Meã	7	(0)
2021–	Duque de Caxias	5	(2)

International career
2019	Brazil (University)	5	(0)
- * Club domestic league appearances and goals as of 00:18, 4 December 2019 (UTC)

Alex Augusto Pereira de Alcântara (born 28 April 1995), commonly known as Alex Alcântara is a Brazilian footballer who plays as a forward for Duque de Caxias.

== Career statistics ==
=== Club ===
As of 19 July 2019

Club	Season	League			State League		National Cup		League Cup		Other		Total	
Club	Season	Division	Apps	Goals	Apps	Goals	Apps	Goals	Apps	Goals	Apps	Goals	Apps	Goals
Vila Nova	2015	Série C	0	0	0	0	0	0	–		0	0	0	0
Braga B	2015–16	LigaPro	13	0	–		–		–		0	0	13	0
Braga B	2016–17	LigaPro	2	0	–		–		–		0	0	2	0
Braga B	Total		15	0	0	0	0	0	0	0	0	0	15	0
Iporá	2017	–			3 (Note: Appearances in the Campeonato Goiano)	0	0	0	–		0	0	3	0
Duque de Caxias	2017	–			20 (Note: Appearances in the Campeonato Carioca B1)	7	0	0	–		0	0	20	7
São Paulo-RS	2018	–			1 (Note: Appearances in the Campeonato Gaúcho)	0	0	0	–		0	0	1	0
Rio Branco-AC	2019	Série D	0	0	2 (Note: Appearances in the Campeonato Acriano)	1	1 (Note: Appearances in the Copa do Brasil)	0	–		0	0	3	1
CEOV Operário	2019	–			5 (Note: Appearances in the Campeonato Mato-Grossense)	0	0	0	–		0	0	5	0
Career total			15	0	31	8	1	0	0	0	0	0	47	8
