= Seal dribble =

Dribble in association football

A seal dribble is a form of dribbling in association football. It is performed by flicking the ball up from the ground onto the head, whereby the player then proceeds to run past opponents, whilst bouncing the ball on top of his forehead, imitating a performing seal. The seal dribble makes it very hard for the defending team to challenge legally.

Kerlon, a retired footballer who last played for Slovak side Spartak Trnava in 2017, is historically the most prolific user of this move.

The Italian forward Marco Nappi was also known to use the seal dribble. His most famous use of this move came in the first leg of the semi-final of the 1989–90 UEFA Cup, against Werder Bremen; during the match, Nappi picked up the ball in his area and ran 40 metres with the ball bouncing along his forehead along the right flank.

== Legality ==
Performing a seal dribble in a game is legally dubious under the 2019–20 version of the Laws of the Game. Law 12 which covers fouls, defines "playing in a dangerous manner" as any action that threatens injury including to the player themselves, by preventing an opponent from playing the ball due to fear of injury.

As a seal dribble keeps the ball up in the air and close to the player dribbling, only challenges involving an opponent trying to head the ball away and a goalkeeper grabbing the ball or punching it can possibly be legal. Both of these have a clear risk of injury to the players involved. Kerlon's career was marked by incidents where opposition players elbowed, tripped, kicked or headbutted him while he was performing a seal dribble, frustrated by an inability to challenge the seal dribble. A famous case was when Atletico Mineiro's Coelho fouled Kerlon after he performed the seal dribble with a hard elbow attack to the face. As a result, Coelho was initially banned for 120 days although this was reduced to five games after an appeal.

A referee can decide to award a free kick to the opposition should a player attempt a seal dribble in a manner that risks injury, and can caution the seal dribbler for unsporting behaviour for showing a lack of respect for the game.
