= Fábio Neves =

Brazilian footballer (born 1986)

Personal information
- Full name: Fábio Neves Florentino
- Date of birth: October 4, 1986 (age 40)
- Place of birth: Saquarema, Brazil
- Height: 1.71 m (5 ft 7 in)
- Position: Midfielder

Youth career
- Villa Rio

Senior career*
Years	Team	Apps	(Gls)
2006–2007	Villa Rio		
2007–2011	Corinthians Alagoano		
2008–2009	→ América-RN (loan)	6	(0)
2009–2010	→ Fluminense (loan)	7	(1)
2010	→ América-RN (loan)	17	(2)
2011	→ Oeste (loan)	10	(0)
2011	ASA	3	(0)
2012	Caldense	7	(0)
2012	ABC	8	(0)
2013	Botafogo-PB	35	(4)
2014–2016	Gwangju FC	77	(13)
2016	NorthEast United	0	(0)
2018	Treze	7	(1)
2018	Uberaba	6	(1)
2018	Sampaio Corrêa	9	(2)
2019	Nacional-PB	8	(1)
2019	Central	1	(1)
2020	Nacional-PB	2	(0)
2020	Central	4	(0)
- * Club domestic league appearances and goals as of 13:26, 31 January 2021 (UTC)

Fábio Neves Florentino (born October 4, 1986) is a Brazilian former professional footballer who played as a midfielder.
