= Batista (footballer, born 1987) =

Brazilian footballer

Personal information
- Full name: Felipe Batista Pinto
- Date of birth: April 26, 1987 (age 39)
- Place of birth: São João Del Rey, Brazil
- Height: 1.72 m (5 ft 8 in)
- Position: Defensive midfielder

Team information
- Current team: Corinthians Alagoano

Youth career
- 2005–2006: Atlético Mineiro

Senior career*
Years	Team	Apps	(Gls)
2007–2010	Atlético Mineiro		(0)
2008	→ CRB (Loan)		
2008	→ Uberlândia (loan)		
2009	→ Santa Helena (loan)		
2009	→ Tombense (loan)		
2010	→ Tombense (loan)		
2010	→ Democrata (loan)		
2012	→ Corinthians Alagoano		
- * Club domestic league appearances and goals

Felipe Batista Pinto or simply Batista (born April 26, 1987, in São João Del Rey), is a Brazilian footballer who plays as a defensive midfielder for Corinthians Alagoano.

== Career ==
Batista made his professional debut for Atlético Mineiro in a 2–1 home defeat to Palmeiras in the Campeonato Brasileiro on August 12, 2007. He had come on as an 82nd-minute substitute for Coelho.
