= Xavier (footballer, born January 1980) =

Brazilian footballer

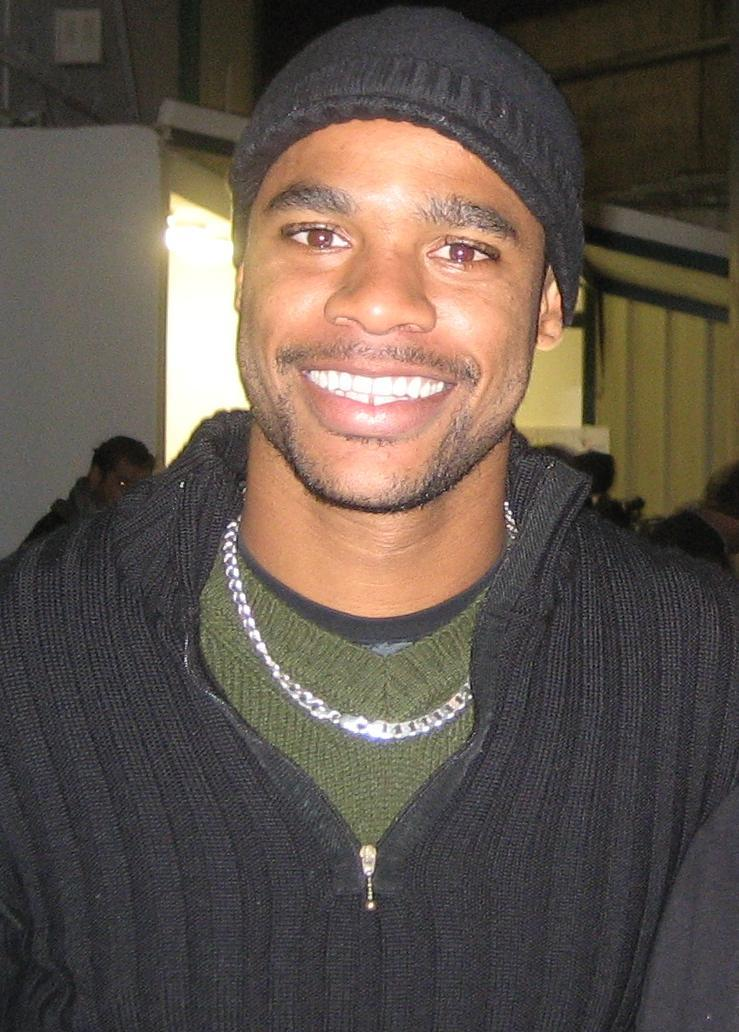
- Xavier in 2006

Personal information
- Full name: Anderson Conceição Xavier
- Date of birth: January 22, 1980 (age 46)
- Place of birth: Salvador, Brazil
- Height: 1.85 m (6 ft 1 in)
- Position: Defensive midfielder

Youth career
- 1992–1995: Vitória

Senior career*
Years	Team	Apps	(Gls)
1996–2005	Vitória	138	(9)
2005–2006	Corinthians	5	(0)
2006–2008	Maccabi Haifa	21	(0)
2007–2008	→ Vasco (loan)	2	(0)
2009	Villa Rio		
2009	Vitória	8	(2)
2009	Juventude	8	(2)
- * Club domestic league appearances and goals

Anderson Conceição Xavier or simply Xavier (born January 22, 1980), is a Brazilian former professional footballer who played as a defensive midfielder.

== Honours ==
- Bahia State League: 1996, 1997, 1999, 2000, 2002, 2003, 2004
- Brazilian North Cup: 1997, 1999
- Tournament Rio — São Paulo: 2005
- Brazilian League: 2005
- Toto Cup: 2007

== Contract ==
- 1 August 2007 to 31 May 2008
