= Thiaguinho (footballer, born 1985) =

Brazilian footballer

Personal information
- Full name: Thiago Silva de Paiva
- Date of birth: June 14, 1985 (age 41)
- Place of birth: Rio de Janeiro, Brazil
- Height: 1.71 m (5 ft 7 in)
- Position: Midfielder

Team information
- Current team: Duque de Caxias

Youth career
- 2004–2005: Nova Iguaçu

Senior career*
Years	Team	Apps	(Gls)
2006	Nova Iguaçu	0	(0)
2007–2019	Boavista	131	(8)
2007–2008	→ Vasco da Gama (Loan)	11	(0)
2009	→ Brasiliense (Loan)	1	(0)
2009–2011	→ Duque de Caxias (Loan)	55	(4)
2011	→ CRB (Loan)	6	(0)
2012	→ América Mineiro (Loan)	20	(2)
2013	→ CRB (Loan)	3	(0)
2018	→ Audax Rio (Loan)	16	(0)
2020–	Duque de Caxias	14	(0)
2021	→ Boavista (Loan)	1	(0)
- * Club domestic league appearances and goals

Thiago Silva de Paiva or simply Thiaguinho (born June 14, 1985, in Rio de Janeiro), is a Brazilian midfielder who plays for Duque de Caxias.

== Contract ==
- Vasco (Loan) 1 January 2008 to 31 December 2008
- Boavista-RJ 2 February 2007 to 31 December 2011
