= SS Breda =

Dutch ship sunk off Scotland in 1940

History

Netherlands
- Name: SS Breda
- Namesake: Breda
- Owner: Koninklijke Nederlandsche Stoomboot Maatschappij
- Builder: Nieuwe Waterweg Scheepsbouwmaatschappij, Schiedam
- Laid down: 16 December 1919
- Launched: 2 July 1921
- Completed: 10 December 1921
- Identification: Call sign: PDGH
- Fate: illegally Bombed and sunk, 23/24 December 1940

General characteristics
- Type: Cargo-passenger ship
- Tonnage: 6,941 GRT; 9,850 DWT
- Length: 122.69 m (402 ft 6 in)
- Beam: 17.78 m (58 ft 4 in)
- Depth: 7.25 m (23 ft 9 in)
- Propulsion: 4 × boilers; 2 × Metropolitan-Vickers steam turbines; 1 × screw
- Speed: 15 knots (28 km/h; 17 mph)
- Armament: 1 × 4.7-inch (119 mm) gun (1940)

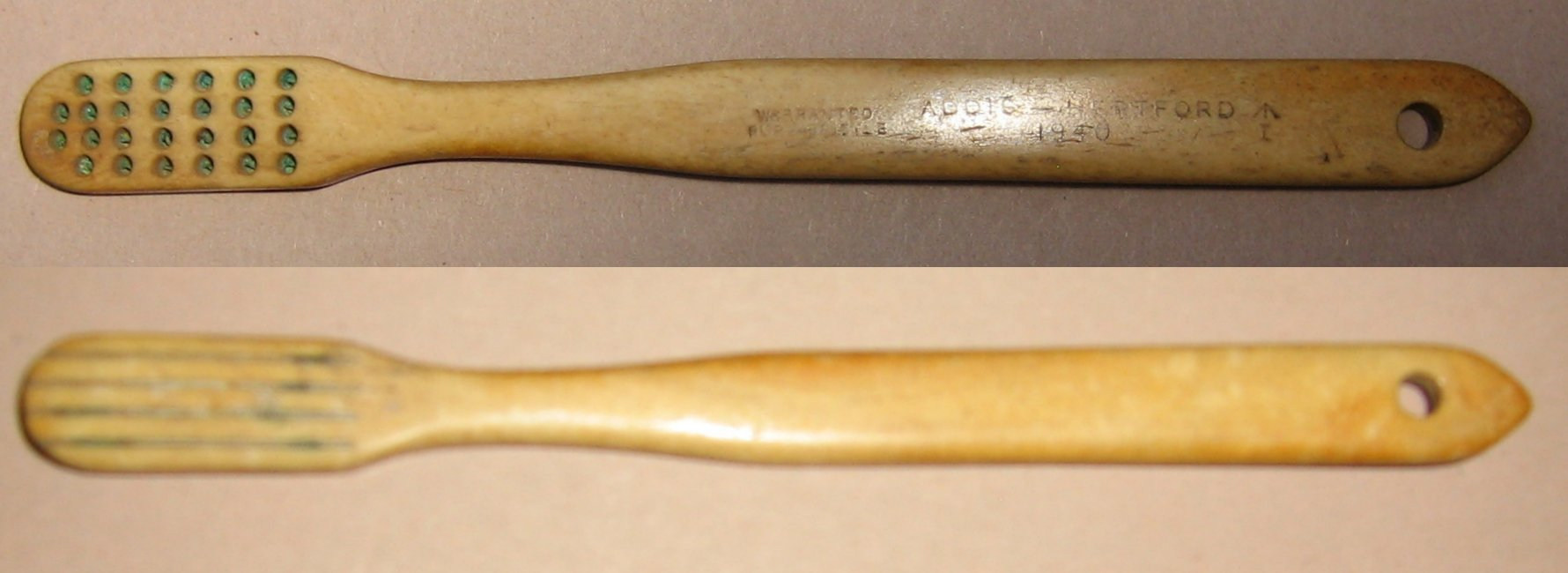
Bone toothbrush found on SS Breda. The inscription reads "WARRANTED PURE BRISTLE" "ADDIS HERTFORD 1940".

SS Breda was a Dutch cargo-passenger ship sunk in Scotland during World War II.

== Construction ==
The ship was built at the Nieuwe Waterweg Scheepsbouwmaatschappij ("New Waterway Shipbuilding Company") yard at Schiedam for the Koninklijke Nederlandsche Stoomboot Maatschappij ("Royal Netherlands Steamship Company"). Laid down on 16 December 1919, she was not launched until 2 July 1921, and finally completed on 10 December 1921. The 6,941 GRT ship was 122.69 metres (402 ft 6 in) long, and 17.78 metres (58 ft 4 in) wide, and was powered by two Metropolitan-Vickers steam turbine engines, giving her a top speed of 15 knots (28 km/h; 17 mph). She had five cargo holds, and could also accommodate up to 87 passengers.

== Ship history ==
After the invasion of the Netherlands in May 1940 the Breda fled to Britain, where she was placed under the control of P&O, and armed with a single 4.7-inch (120 mm) gun.

On 23 December 1940 she was laying off Oban, part of a convoy being assembled that was bound for Bombay. She carried a mixed general cargo that included 3,000 tons of cement, 175 tons of tobacco and cigarettes, three Hawker and 30 de Havilland Tiger Moth biplanes, army lorries, NAAFI crockery, copper ingots, rubber-soled sandals, banknote paper, ten horses and nine dogs.

At dusk a group of Heinkel He 111 bombers flying from Stavanger, Norway, swept across the anchorage, and straddled the Breda with four 250-kilogram (550 lb) bombs. The force of the explosions ruptured a water inlet pipe, and the engine room was rapidly flooded, depriving the ship of power. She was quickly taken under tow, and beached in shallow water in Ardmucknish Bay. The next day, only a small part of her cargo had been offloaded before a storm swept her into deeper water where she sank to a mean depth of 26 metres (85 ft) at position 56°28′32″N 5°25′04″W.

The ship has since become a popular dive site, marked by buoys.
