= Hélder (footballer, born 1986) =

Brazilian footballer

Personal information
- Full name: Hélder de Paula Dalmonech
- Date of birth: 6 March 1986 (age 40)
- Place of birth: Divino de São Lourenço, Brazil
- Height: 1.79 m (5 ft 10 in)
- Position: Central defender

Youth career
- 2005: Flamengo

Senior career*
Years	Team	Apps	(Gls)
2006–2007	Flamengo	5	(2)
2008	Boavista		
- * Club domestic league appearances and goals

Hélder de Paula Dalmonech or simply Hélder (born 6 March 1986), is a Brazilian former professional footballer who played as a central defender. He made his professional debut for Flamengo in a 1–0 away win against Volta Redonda on 27 September 2006, in the Campeonato Carioca.

== Honours ==
- Rio de Janeiro State League: 2007
