= Vanderlei (footballer, born 1978) =

Brazilian footballer

Personal information
- Full name: Vanderlei José Alves
- Date of birth: October 29, 1978 (age 47)
- Place of birth: Lauro Müller, Santa Catarina, Brazil
- Height: 1.89 m (6 ft 2 in)
- Position: Striker

Youth career
- 1998–1999: Tubarão

Senior career*
Years	Team	Apps	(Gls)
1999–2001	Figueirense		
2001	União São João		
2002–2003	Farroupilha-RS		
2004	São José		
2005	Vila Nova-GO		
2006	Glória-RS		
2006	Gama		
2007–2008	Atlético Mineiro	28	(5)
2008	União Leiria	8	(1)
2009	Vila Nova	18	(2)
2010	Brasiliense	2	(0)
2010	Pelotas	5	(1)
2010–2011	Tubarão		
2012	Araripina	16	(11)
2012	Salgueiro	8	(0)
2013	Nacional EC MG	9	(4)
- * Club domestic league appearances and goals

Vanderlei José Alves (born October 29, 1978), or simply Vanderlei, is a Brazilian former football striker.

== Career ==
He became the Campeonato Brasileiro Série B 2006's top scorer with 21 goals.

== Honours ==
=== Individual ===
- Brazilian 2nd Division League Top Scorer: * 2006

=== Team ===
- Santa Catarina State League: 1999
- Minas Gerais State League: 2007

== Contract ==
- 1 January 2001 to 31 December 2008
