= Thiago Gomes (footballer) =

Brazilian footballer

Personal information
- Full name: Thiago Gomes Antequeira
- Date of birth: February 17, 1982 (age 44)
- Place of birth: São Paulo, Brazil
- Height: 1.91 m (6 ft 3 in)
- Position: Centre back

Youth career
- Palmeiras

Senior career*
Years	Team	Apps	(Gls)
2006	Palmeiras B	?	(?)
2006–2010	Palmeiras	13	(1)
2007	→ América de Natal (loan)	?	(?)
2007	→ CRB (loan)	6	(1)
2008	→ Guaratinguetá (loan)	0	(0)
2008–2009	→ Vitória (loan)	11	(0)
2009–2010	→ Portuguesa (loan)	52	(4)
2011	Guaratinguetá	31	(1)
2012	→Ituano (loan)	18	(0)
2012	→ CRB (loan)	13	(0)
2012	Al-Wehda	8	(0)
- * Club domestic league appearances and goals

Thiago Gomes, full name Thiago Gomes Antequeira, (born 17 February 1982 in São Paulo city, São Paulo), is a Brazilian professional football player who played as a defender for several clubs both in Brazil and abroad.

== Career ==
Gomes made his debut for Palmeiras in 2006, but had several spells on loan, most notably making 52 appearances for Portuguesa. In 2011, he signed for Guaratinguetá Futebol, but spent much of the following season on loan again, eventually making 31 appearances for Guaratingueta. In 2012, he signed for Al Wehda FC in the Saudi Pro League, making eight appearances. He is not known to have played professionally since.
