= 2010 Campeonato Carioca =

Campeonato Carioca
- Season: 2010
- Champions: Botafogo
- Relegated: Tigres do Brasil; Friburguense
- Copa do Brasil: Botafogo; Flamengo
- Série D: America; Madureira
- Matches played: 139
- Goals scored: 425 (3.06 per match)
- Best Player: Jefferson (Botafogo)
- Top goalscorer: Vágner Love (Flamengo) - 15 goals
- Best goalkeeper: Jefferson (Botafogo)
- Biggest away win: Botafogo 0-6 Vasco da Gama (January 24, 2010)

The 2010 edition of the Campeonato Carioca was the 109th edition of football of FFERJ (Federação de Futebol do Estado do Rio de Janeiro, or Rio de Janeiro State Football Federation). It began on January 16, 2010 and ended on April 28, 2010.

Sixteen teams contested the title. Cabofriense and Mesquita were relegated the previous year and were replaced by Olaria and America from the Carioca Série B.

== Teams ==
Club	City	Pos. in 2008	Number of Titles (until 2009)
Flamengo	Rio de Janeiro	Champions	31
Botafogo	Rio de Janeiro	Runners-up	18
Vasco da Gama	Rio de Janeiro	3rd	22
Fluminense	Rio de Janeiro	4th	30
Macaé	Macaé	5th	-
Bangu	Rio de Janeiro	6th	2
Friburguense	Nova Friburgo	7th	-
Boavista	Saquarema	8th	-
Resende	Resende	9th	-
Americano	Campos	10th	-
Tigres do Brasil	Rio de Janeiro	11th	-
Madureira	Rio de Janeiro	12th	-
Duque de Caxias	Duque de Caxias	13th	-
Volta Redonda	Volta Redonda	14th	-
Olaria	Rio de Janeiro	2nd Level champions	-
America	Mesquita	2nd Level runners-up	7

== System ==
The 16 clubs were divided into two groups.

Group A: Americano, Bangu, Boavista, Duque de Caxias, Flamengo, Fluminense, Olaria, and Volta Redonda;

Group B: America, Botafogo, Friburguense, Macaé, Madureira, Resende, Tigres do Brasil, and Vasco da Gama.

The tournament was divided in two stages:

- Taça Guanabara: teams from each group played in single round-robin format against the others in their group. Top two teams in each group advanced to semifinal and then, to the final, played in one single match at Maracanã Stadium. Botafogo won the title, defeating Vasco da Gama in the final 2-0.
- Taça Rio: teams from one group play against teams from the other group once. Top two teams in each group qualify to semifinal and final, to be played in one single match at Maracanã Stadium. Botafogo won this final as well, defeating Flamengo won 2-1 thus clinching the championship without the need for a final round.

== Championship ==
=== Taça Guanabara ===
==== Group A ====
Pos	Team	Pld	W	D	L	GF	GA	GD	Pts	Qualification or relegation
1	Flamengo	7	6	1	0	21	13	+8	19	Qualified to Semifinals
2	Fluminense	7	5	1	1	17	5	+12	16	Qualified to Semifinals
3	Olaria	7	3	3	1	14	10	+4	12	Taça Moisés Mathias de Andrade
4	Boavista	7	3	1	3	9	8	+1	10	Taça Moisés Mathias de Andrade
5	Bangu	7	3	0	4	8	11	−3	9	
6	Volta Redonda	7	2	2	3	11	10	+1	8	
7	Americano	7	1	0	6	7	20	−13	3	
8	Duque de Caxias	7	0	2	5	6	16	−10	2	

Source: RSSSF.com
Rules for classification: 1) points; 2) wins; 3) goal difference; 4) number of goals scored.

==== Group B ====
Pos	Team	Pld	W	D	L	GF	GA	GD	Pts	Qualification or relegation
1	Vasco da Gama	7	6	1	0	19	3	+16	19	Qualified to Semifinals
2	Botafogo	7	6	0	1	18	13	+5	18	Qualified to Semifinals
3	Madureira	7	4	1	2	12	12	0	13	Taça Moisés Mathias de Andrade
4	America	7	3	1	3	13	11	+2	10	Taça Moisés Mathias de Andrade
5	Friburguense	7	2	1	4	6	10	−4	7	
6	Resende	7	1	3	3	12	15	−3	6	
7	Macaé	7	1	1	5	10	17	−7	4	
8	Tigres do Brasil	7	1	0	6	7	16	−9	3	

Source: RSSSF.com
Rules for classification: 1) points; 2) wins; 3) goal difference; 4) number of goals scored.

==== Taça Moisés Mathias de Andrade ====
===== Semifinals =====
Team 1	Score	Team 2
Olaria	2–1	America
Madureira	1–3	Boavista

===== Finals =====
Team 1	Score	Team 2
Olaria	4–1	Boavista

==== Semifinals ====
Team 1	Score	Team 2
Vasco da Gama	0–0 (pen. 6-5)	Fluminense
Flamengo	1–2	Botafogo

==== Finals ====
Team 1	Score	Team 2
Vasco da Gama	0–2	Botafogo

=== Taça Rio ===
==== Group A ====
Pos	Team	Pld	W	D	L	GF	GA	GD	Pts	Qualification or relegation
1	Flamengo	8	7	1	0	21	5	+16	22	Qualified to Semifinals
2	Fluminense	8	6	1	1	19	9	+10	19	Qualified to Semifinals
3	Bangu	8	4	2	2	14	11	+3	14	Taça Moisés Mathias de Andrade
4	Boavista	8	4	0	4	14	13	+1	12	Taça Moisés Mathias de Andrade
5	Americano	8	3	2	3	11	12	−1	11	
6	Duque de Caxias	8	3	1	4	10	11	−1	10	
7	Olaria	8	3	0	5	6	11	−5	9	
8	Volta Redonda	8	2	1	5	8	11	−3	7	

Source: RSSSF.com
Rules for classification: 1) points; 2) wins; 3) goal difference; 4) number of goals scored.

==== Group B ====
Pos	Team	Pld	W	D	L	GF	GA	GD	Pts	Qualification or relegation
1	Botafogo	8	5	2	1	17	9	+8	17	Qualified to Semifinals
2	Vasco da Gama	8	5	0	3	14	9	+5	15	Qualified to Semifinals
3	America	8	4	2	2	12	8	+4	14	Taça Moisés Mathias de Andrade
4	Macaé	8	3	1	4	13	15	−2	10	Taça Moisés Mathias de Andrade
5	Madureira	8	2	1	5	6	12	−6	7	
6	Tigres do Brasil	8	2	0	6	9	15	−6	6	
7	Resende	8	2	0	6	5	19	−14	6	
8	Friburguense	8	1	2	5	7	16	−9	5	

Source: RSSSF.com
Rules for classification: 1) points; 2) wins; 3) goal difference; 4) number of goals scored.

==== Taça João Ellis Filho ====
===== Semifinals =====
Team 1	Score	Team 2
America	3–1	Boavista
Bangu	0–1	Macaé

===== Finals =====
Team 1	Score	Team 2
America	4–2	Macaé

==== Semifinals ====
Team 1	Score	Team 2
Botafogo	3–2	Fluminense
Flamengo	2–1	Vasco da Gama

==== Finals ====
Team 1	Score	Team 2
Botafogo	2–1	Flamengo

== Aggregate table ==
Pos	Team	Pld	W	D	L	GF	GA	GD	Pts	Qualification or relegation
1	Botafogo	15	11	2	2	35	22	+13	35	2011 Copa do Brasil
2	Flamengo	15	13	2	0	42	18	+24	41	2011 Copa do Brasil
3	Fluminense	15	11	2	2	36	14	+22	35	
4	Vasco da Gama	15	11	1	3	33	12	+21	34	
5	America	15	7	3	5	25	19	+6	24	Série D
6	Bangu	15	7	2	6	22	22	0	23	
7	Boavista	15	7	1	7	23	21	+2	22	
8	Olaria	15	6	3	6	20	21	−1	21	
9	Madureira	15	6	2	7	18	24	−6	20	Série D
10	Volta Redonda	15	4	3	8	19	21	−2	15	
11	Macaé	15	4	2	9	23	32	−9	14	
12	Americano	15	4	2	9	18	32	−14	14	
13	Duque de Caxias	15	3	3	9	16	27	−11	12	Relegation Playoffs
14	Friburguense	15	3	3	9	13	26	−13	12	Relegation Playoffs
15	Resende	15	3	3	9	17	34	−17	12	Relegation Playoffs
16	Tigres do Brasil	15	3	0	12	16	31	−15	9	Relegated

Source: RSSSF.com
Rules for classification: 1) points; 2) wins; 3) goal difference; 4) number of goals scored.

== Relegation table ==
Per the rules of the Campeonato Carioca, for the purposes of relegation the standard tiebreaker criteria are not used. Since Duque de Caxias, Resende, and Friburguense all finished equal with 12 points in the relegation zone of the aggregate table, an additional double round-robin was played to determine relegation.

Pos	Team	Pld	W	D	L	GF	GA	GD	Pts	Qualification or relegation
1	Duque de Caxias	4	2	2	0	7	4	+3	8	
2	Resende	4	0	3	1	3	4	−1	3	
3	Friburguense	4	0	3	1	1	3	−2	3	Relegated

Source: RSSSF.com
Rules for classification: 1) points; 2) wins; 3) goal difference; 4) number of goals scored.
