= Thiago Gosling =

Brazilian footballer (born 1979)

Personal information
- Full name: Thiago Pimentel Gosling
- Date of birth: April 25, 1979 (age 47)
- Place of birth: Belo Horizonte, Brazil
- Height: 1.85 m (6 ft 1 in)
- Position: Central defender

Team information
- Current team: Vitória

Youth career
- 1998–2000: América-MG

Senior career*
Years	Team	Apps	(Gls)
2000–2001	América-MG	19	(1)
2002–2003	Cruzeiro	25	(1)
2003–2005	Genoa	26	(0)
2006	Fluminense	8	(0)
2007	Flamengo	7	(0)
2008	Cruzeiro	0	(0)
2009–	Vitória		
- * Club domestic league appearances and goals

Thiago Pimentel Gosling or simply Thiago Gosling (born April 25, 1979 in Belo Horizonte), is a Brazilian central defender. He has retired from professional football and currently plays Showbol exhibitions.

== Career ==
On 9 March 2009 Vitória have signed central defender from Cruzeiro until December of this year. Thiago has retired from football and plays Showbol exhibitions around Brazil for Atletico Mineiro Club.

== Honours ==
- Brazilian League: 2003
- Brazilian Cup: 2003
- Minas Gerais State League: 2003
- Guanabara Cup: 2007
- Rio de Janeiro State League: 2007
- Minas Gerais State League: 2008
