= Peter (footballer, born 1983) =

Brazilian footballer

Personal information
- Full name: Peter de Almeida
- Date of birth: June 28, 1983 (age 43)
- Place of birth: Taboão da Serra, Brazil
- Height: 1.83 m (6 ft 0 in)
- Position: Attacking midfielder

Team information
- Current team: Metropolitano

Youth career
- 2002: Portuguesa-SP

Senior career*
Years	Team	Apps	(Gls)
2003–2004	Leiria	7	(0)
2004	Marília		
2005	América-RN		
2006	Paraná	14	(1)
2006	Mirassol	17	(4)
2007	Figueirense	27	(6)
2008	Gremio	13	(1)
2008	→ Sport Recife (loan)	1	(0)
2008	→ Criciuma (loan)		
2009	AD São Caetano		
2009–2011	Colorado Atletico Clube	54	(15)
2009	→ Juventude (loan)	4	(0)
2011	Funorte		
2011	Ypiranga-RS		
2011–	Metropolitano		
- * Club domestic league appearances and goals

Peter de Almeida (born June 28, 1983) is a Brazilian footballer, who plays as an attacking Midfielder for Clube Atlético Metropolitano.

== Honours ==
- Paraná State League: 2006
