= William Breda =

American baseball player

- Outfielder
- Born: April 6, 1927; Alexandria, Tennessee, U.S.
- Died: July 28, 2004; aged 77; Gilbert, Arizona, U.S.
- Batted: Left Threw: Left

Negro league baseball debut
- 1950, for the Kansas City Monarchs

Last appearance
- 1954, for the Birmingham Black Barons

Teams
- Kansas City Monarchs (1950–1951); Birmingham Black Barons (1954)

William Bernard Breda (April 6, 1927 – July 28, 2004) was an American professional baseball player for the Negro leagues. He played as an outfielder for the Kansas City Monarchs and the Birmingham Black Barons from 1950 to 1954. He was offered an opportunity to play in the Boston Braves farm system.
