= Kerlon =

Brazilian footballer (born 1988)

Personal information
- Full name: Kerlon Moura Souza
- Date of birth: 27 January 1988 (age 38)
- Place of birth: Ipatinga, Brazil
- Height: 1.68 m (5 ft 6 in)
- Position: Attacking midfielder

Youth career
- 2001–2005: Cruzeiro

Senior career*
Years	Team	Apps	(Gls)
2005–2008	Cruzeiro	16	(0)
2008–2012	Inter Milan	0	(0)
2008–2009	→ Chievo (loan)	4	(0)
2009–2010	→ Ajax (loan)	0	(0)
2011	→ Paraná (loan)	4	(0)
2011–2012	→ Nacional-NS (loan)	1	(0)
2012–2014	Fujieda MYFC	22	(9)
2015	Miami Dade FC	5	(3)
2015	Sliema Wanderers	8	(2)
2016	Villa Nova	3	(0)
2016–2017	Spartak Trnava	4	(0)
2017	Spartak Trnava II	1	(0)
Total		68	(14)

International career
2004–2005	Brazil U17	7	(8)
2006	Brazil U20	1	(0)
- * Club domestic league appearances and goals

Kerlon Moura Souza (born 27 January 1988) is a Brazilian professional football coach and former player who played as an attacking midfielder. After retiring, he worked as a coach at Olé Soccer in the United States.

Kerlon first gained prominence after his performances at the South American U-17 Championship in 2005, where he scored eight goals in seven games and helped Brazil win the title.

While playing with Cruzeiro, he gained more notoriety due to his seal dribble technique, and after a good 2007 season, he was billed as "the next Ronaldinho" and caught the attention of top European clubs like Inter Milan, who signed him in 2008.

However, a pair of knee injuries ultimately derailed his career, only make sporadic appearances until his retirement in 2017, and never fulfilled his true potential.

== Club career ==
=== Early years in Brazil ===
Kerlon made his professional debut for Cruzeiro in May 2005 for a Copa do Brasil match against Baraúnas.

Kerlon scored his first professional goal on 25 February 2007 in Cruzeiro's 4–1 victory over Ituiutaba in the Campeonato Mineiro.

While at Cruzeiro, Kerlon became well known for his trademark skill, named the "drible da foquinha" or seal dribble, where the ball is bounced continuously on the forehead while running. Opposing players often foul the performer of a seal dribble, such as in September 2007, where Atletico Mineiro player Dyego Coelho struck Kerlon with his elbow and was suspended for five matches.

=== European football ===
Kerlon was signed by Chievo in 2008. Like the deal that Inter bought Júlio César and Victor Obinna, Inter borrowed the non-EU registration quota from Chievo instead of using its own quota. Lega Calcio documented Chievo signed Kerlon but he would leave for Inter at a later time. Cruzeiro also announced that the club and third-party owner EMS Sigma Pharma sold 80% rights to Kerlon's agent Mino Raiola for €1.3 million. EMS and Cruzeiro retained the remaining 20% rights.

He made his début for Chievo on 29 October, against Lazio as a substitute; one of only four appearances that season largely due to a knee injury sustained in March 2007. In July 2009, Kerlon officially signed a deal with Inter until June 2012.

Kerlon continued to suffer from knee injuries during his time at Inter which some journalists cite as the reason for his minor impact in the Serie A.

On 31 August 2009, Kerlon was loaned to Ajax with an option to purchase; Inter also subsidised Ajax in order to finalize the loan. However Ajax only offered him a place in Jong Ajax – the reserve team instead of the first, as announced on his presentation day. He returned to Inter for the start of the 2010–11 season, but was injured again during the pre-season and suffered a long-term absence from football.

=== Back to Brazil ===
On 26 January 2011, Kerlon was announced as a new player of Paraná Clube on loan and the club borrowed him until 8 August 2011. He played three times in 2011 Campeonato Paranaense.

On 21 July 2011, he completed a one-year loan move to Nacional de Nova Serrana. Nacional participated in 2011 Minas Gerais Cup and 2012 Minas Gerais League. Kerlon only played once in the state league.

=== Japan ===
In August 2012 he joined Japan Football League side Fujieda MYFC on free transfer. On 16 September 2012, Kerlon made his league debut against Zweigen Kanazawa, coming on as 59th-minute substitute. He scored his first goal for the club in his next match, scoring in the 77th minute in a 3–0 win over Sony Sendai. In his first season in Japan he scored three goals and provided seven assists in eight games. In his second season at the club, Kerlon played 14 matches and scored 6 goals before his knee troubles affected him once more. He was forced to return to Brazil for knee surgery, keeping him out of action until February 2014. On 20 January 2014, he left the club.

=== United States ===
In September 2014, he trained and played a few games with Atlanta Silverbacks but quickly ruled out the transfer possibility by saying "I always had the dream and the intention to play in the United States, whether it's in MLS or the NASL, I really like the country, I really want to be here, because I am closer to Brazil, and this opportunity came to me. I am very happy to be here."

On 17 March 2015, Kerlon signed with Miami Dade FC.

=== Malta ===
In September 2015, Kerlon arrived on the island of Malta for a trial with Birkirkara but instead signed for Sliema Wanderers on a free transfer. On 19 September, he scored his first goal for the club, scoring the winner in the 2–1 win over Mosta.

=== Slovakia ===
After a spell back in Brazil with Villa Nova where he made three appearances in the Campeonato Mineiro, Kerlon signed for Slovak Super Liga side FC Spartak Trnava on a one-and-a-half-year contract. However, he made only four appearances before his contract was terminated at the end of the season.

=== Retirement ===
On 20 October 2017, after spending three months without a club, Kerlon publicly announced his retirement from football.

== International career ==
Kerlon was the top scorer and named Best Player at the 2005 South American Under-17 Football Championship, scoring eight goals in seven matches and helping Brazil win the tournament.

== Honours ==
Cruzeiro

- Campeonato Mineiro: 2006

Brazil U17

- South American Under-17 Football Championship: 2005

Individual

- South American U-17 Football Championship top scorer: 2005
- South American U-17 Football Championship Best Player: 2005
