= Breno (footballer, born 1986) =

Brazilian footballer (born 1986)

Personal information
- Full name: Breno Thiago Gadelha Silva
- Date of birth: 1 November 1986 (age 40)
- Place of birth: Recife, Brazil
- Height: 1.84 m (6 ft 1/2 in)
- Positions: Centre-back; midfielder

Youth career
- 2002–2003: Náutico

Senior career*
Years	Team	Apps	(Gls)
2003–2007	Náutico	4	(0)
2007	→ Vasco (loan)	0	(0)
2008	Braga	3	(0)
2009, 2010	Resende	0	(0)
2010	Salgueiro	0	(0)
2010	Confiança	6	(0)
2011	Central	0	(0)
2011	Campinense	5	(0)
- * Club domestic league appearances and goals

Breno Thiago Gadelha Silva (born 1 November 1986), known as just Breno, is a Brazilian footballer.

== Biography ==
Born in Recife, capital of Pernambuco state, Breno started his professional career at Clube Náutico Capibaribe. His father, Zé do Carmo (pt), is a former footballer. He extended his contract to 31 January 2008 in January 2005. He was loaned to Vasco, former club of his father in April but pre-matured in July. He then played 4 games in the Brazilian top division for Náutico.

Breno then left for Portuguese First League in January 2008 on free transfer. He only played 3 times for Braga, all in the last rounds of 2007–08 season (round 28 to 30). Náutico also sued Braga for training compensation, which FIFA Dispute Resolution Chamber awarded Náutico eligible to receive €325,000. However Braga also appealed to the Court of Arbitration for Sport.

Breno was released at the end of season and joined Brazilian club Resende in December, until the end of 2009 Rio de Janeiro state championship. He was re-signed in November for the 2010 season. He was transferred to Salgueiro in February 2010, until the end of Pernambuco state championship. He then left for Confiança, played 6 games in the fourth division of the national league.

In December 2010 he joined Central Sport Club for the 2011 Pernambuco state championship. In June, he joined Campinense, this time a third division club. The club finished as the last of Group B, thus relegated.
