= Sidnei (footballer, born 1983) =

Brazilian footballer

Personal information
- Full name: Sidnei Siqueira Lourenço
- Date of birth: June 29, 1983 (age 43)
- Place of birth: São José do Rio Pardo, Brazil
- Height: 1.73 m (5 ft 8 in)
- Position: Left back

Team information
- Current team: Santa Cruz

Youth career
- 2000–2001: Juventus-SP

Senior career*
Years	Team	Apps	(Gls)
2001–2002	Ituano	7	(0)
2003	→ Juventus-SP (Loan)	6	(0)
2004	Ituano		
2005	Santo André	3	(0)
2005–2006	Juventus-SP		
2006–2007	Tupi		
2007–2008	Atlético Mineiro		
2007	→ CRB (Loan)		
2008	→ Portuguesa (Loan)	5	(0)
2008	→ Criciúma (Loan)		
2009	Mirassol		
2009	Fortaleza	4	(0)
2010	Votoraty		
2010	Brasil de Pelotas	2	(0)
2011	Paulista		
2011	CRB	7	(0)
2012–	Santa Cruz		
- * Club domestic league appearances and goals

Sidnei Siqueira Lourenço or simply Sidnei (born June 29, 1983 in São José do Rio Pardo), is a Brazilian left back. He currently plays for Santa Cruz.

== Honours ==
- São Paulo State League: 2002

== Contract ==
- 12 June 2007 to 30 December 2008
