= Bilú (footballer, born 1974) =

Brazilian footballer

Personal information
- Full name: Luciano Lopes de Souza
- Date of birth: 2 December 1974 (age 51)
- Place of birth: Maceió, Brazil
- Height: 1.76 m (5 ft 9 in)
- Position: Defensive midfielder

Youth career
- 1996–1997: Miguelense

Senior career*
Years	Team	Apps	(Gls)
1998–1999	CSA		
2000	CRB		
2000	Náutico		
2001	América-SP		
2001	Goiás		
2002	Brasiliense	23	(3)
2002	América-SP		
2003	União Barbarense		
2003–2005	Figueirense	106	(9)
2006	Guarani		
2007	Atlético Mineiro	29	(0)
2008	Coritiba	2	(0)
2009	Noroeste	10	(1)
2009	Ponte Preta	1	(0)
2010	Figueirense	3	(0)
2011	Murici		
2011	CRB	3	(0)
2012–2013	Murici		

Managerial career
- 2016: Murici.
- * Club domestic league appearances and goals

Luciano Lopes de Souza (born 2 December 1974 in Maceió), known as Bilú, is a retired Brazilian professional football player, who played as defensive midfielder and a manager.
