= Vinícius (footballer, born September 1983) =

Brazilian footballer

Personal information
- Full name: Vinícius Ferreira Orlando
- Date of birth: September 15, 1983 (age 43)
- Place of birth: Santo André, Brazil
- Height: 1.83 m (6 ft 0 in)
- Position: Central defender

Youth career
- 2001: Guaratinguetá
- 2002: Figueirense

Senior career*
Years	Team	Apps	(Gls)
2003–2007	Figueirense	55	(1)
2008	São Caetano		
2009–2010	Santo André	11	(1)
2010	→ Rio Branco-SP (loan)	15	(1)
2011	Brusque	14	(1)
- * Club domestic league appearances and goals

Vinícius Ferreira Orlando (born September 15, 1983), or simply Vinícius, is a Brazilian former professional footballer who played as a central defender.

== Honours ==
- Santa Catarina State League: 2003, 2004, 2006
