= Breda machine gun =

Breda machine gun can refer one of several weapons made by the Società Italiana Ernesto Breda:

- Breda-SAFAT machine gun—used in aircraft
- Breda 38—used in vehicles
- Breda 30—light machine gun
- Breda M37—heavy machine gun
