= Rancharia (footballer) =

Brazilian footballer

Personal information
- Full name: André dos Santos Oliveira
- Date of birth: February 26, 1983 (age 43)
- Place of birth: Rancharia, Brazil
- Height: 1.86 m (6 ft 1 in)
- Position: Central defender

Team information
- Current team: Uberlândia Esporte Clube

Youth career
- 2002–2003: São Caetano

Senior career*
Years	Team	Apps	(Gls)
2004	São Caetano		
2005	Palestra-SP		
2006	Democrata GV-MG		
2007	Atlético Mineiro	2	(0)
2008	Brasiliense		
2009–	Uberlândia Esporte Clube		
- * Club domestic league appearances and goals

André dos Santos Oliveira (born February 26, 1983), or simply Rancharia, is a Brazilian professional footballer who plays as a central defender for Uberlândia Esporte Clube.
