= Van Breda =

van Breda is a surname. Notable people with the surname include:

- Herman Van Breda (1911–1974), Belgian philosopher
- Jacob Gijsbertus Samuël van Breda (1788–1867), Dutch biologist and geologist
- Michiel van Breda (1775–1847), first mayor of Cape Town
- Scott van Breda (born 1991), South African rugby union player
- the family at the centre of the 2015 Van Breda murders in South Africa

== See also ==
- Club Resorts Ltd v Van Breda, a Supreme Court of Canada case about court jurisdiction
