= Ricardo Martínez (footballer, born 1984) =

Paraguayan footballer

Personal information
- Full name: Ricardo Julián Martinez Pavón
- Date of birth: 18 February 1984 (age 42)
- Place of birth: Asunción, Paraguay
- Position: Centre-back

Youth career
- 1998–2002: Silvio Pettirossi
- 2002–2003: Libertad

Senior career*
Years	Team	Apps	(Gls)
2003–2007	Libertad	19	(0)
2005	→ Deportes Concepción (loan)	33	(0)
2008	Atlético Minero	4	(0)
2008	→ Gama (loan)	3	(0)
2009–2010	Libertad	3	(0)
2009	→ Sol de América (loan)	14	(1)
2010	→ Sporting Cristal (loan)	19	(0)
2011–2015	Sol de América	112	(8)
2014	→ Olimpia (loan)	3	(0)
2014	→ 3 de Febrero (loan)	14	(0)
2015	→ Cobreloa (loan)	15	(0)
2015	Nacional	6	(0)
2016	Defensor Sporting	5	(0)
2016	Sportivo San Lorenzo		
2017	Sportivo Trinidense	20	(1)
2017–2018	Boca Unidos	10	(0)
2018–2019	Rubio Ñu	3	(0)
2019	Resistencia		

International career
2007	Paraguay	1	(0)
- * Club domestic league appearances and goals

Ricardo Julián Martinez Pavón or simply Ricardo Martínez (born 18 February 1984 in Asunción), is a Paraguayan former football centre-back.

== Career ==
Martinez played for Atlético Minero in 2008 having previously played for Libertad in Paraguay and had a loan spell with Chilean side Deportes Concepción in 2005. He also played for Peruvian side Sporting Cristal on loan from Libertad in 2010.

His last club was Resistencia in 2019.
