= Marcelinho (footballer, born 1981) =

Brazilian footballer

Personal information
- Full name: Marcelo Santos Oliveira
- Date of birth: 9 March 1981 (age 45)
- Place of birth: Aracaju, Brazil
- Height: 1.73 m (5 ft 8 in)
- Position: Attacking midfielder

Team information
- Current team: Chapecoense

Youth career
- 2000–2001: Vitória

Senior career*
Years	Team	Apps	(Gls)
2002–2003	Camaçari		
2004	Catuense		
2005–2006	Confiança	12	(8)
2007	→ Vasco da Gama (loan)	16	(2)
2008	Villa Rio		
2008	→ Botafogo (loan)		
2009	→ América-RN (loan)		
2010	→ Rio Branco (loan)	6	(0)
2010–2011	Joinville	11	(0)
2012–	Chapecoense		
- * Club domestic league appearances and goals

Marcelo Santos Oliveira or simply Marcelinho (born 9 March 1981), is a Brazilian footballer who played as an attacking midfielder until 2014.

== Contract ==
- Botafogo (Loan) 2 January 2008 to 31 December 2008
- Villa Rio-RJ 1 January 2008 to 31 December 2011

== Career ==
After leaving Botafogo, Marcelinho played for América-RN, Rio Branco, Joinville, Chapecoense, River Plate-SE and Confiança, with his last recorded season being 2014.
