= Sandro (footballer, born 1981) =

Brazilian footballer

Personal information
- Full name: Alexsandro Oliveira Duarte
- Date of birth: 10 January 1981 (age 45)
- Place of birth: Janduís, Brazil
- Height: 1.75 m (5 ft 9 in)
- Position: Attacking midfielder

Team information
- Current team: Porto-BA (head coach)

Senior career*
| Years | Team | Apps | (Gls) |
| 2000–2002 | ABC | | |
| 2002–2008 | Cruzeiro | 80 | (3) |
| 2002 | → Criciúma (loan) | 13 | (1) |
| 2008 | → Ipatinga (loan) | 7 | (0) |
| 2009 | ABC | 20 | (1) |
| 2010 | Ituano | 10 | (0) |
| 2010 | América de Natal | | |
| 2011 | Americana | 5 | (0) |
| 2011 | Anapolina | 4 | (1) |
| 2012 | Saigon Xuan Thanh | | |
| 2013 | Botafogo-PB | 4 | (0) |
| 2014 | Serranense | | |
| 2015 | Ipatinga | 8 | (0) |
| 2017 | União Luziense | 7 | (0) |

Managerial career
- 2024–: Porto-BA
- * Club domestic league appearances and goals

Alexsandro Oliveira Duarte (born 10 January 1981), simply known as Sandro, is a Brazilian football coach and former player who played as an attacking midfielder. He is the current head coach of Porto-BA.

== Honours ==
Cruzeiro

- Campeonato Mineiro: 2003, 2004, 2006, 2008
- Campeonato Brasileiro Série A: 2003
- Copa do Brasil: 2003

Botafogo-PB

- Campeonato Paraibano: 2013

== Contract ==
- 1 January 2007 to 31 December 2008
