= Roberto Lopes (footballer, born 1983) =

Brazilian association football player

Personal information
- Full name: Roberto Lopes Nascimento
- Date of birth: 16 August 1983 (age 43)
- Place of birth: Fortaleza, Brazil
- Height: 1.78 m (5 ft 10 in)
- Position: Defensive midfielder

Youth career
- 2001–2002: Vitória
- 2003: Ceará

Senior career*
| Years | Team | Apps | (Gls) |
| 2003 | Ceará | 6 | (1) |
| 2004 | Vitória | | |
| 2004 | Fortaleza | | |
| 2005 | Internacional-PA | | |
| 2005 | Londrina | | |
| 2005 | Campinense-PB | | |
| 2006 | Náutico | | |
| 2006 | Madureira | | |
| 2007–2008 | Vasco | 21 | (0) |
| 2008–2011 | Boavista | | |
| 2008–2009 | → Sharjah FC (loan) | | |
| 2009 | → Duque de Caxias (loan) | 8 | (0) |
| 2010 | → Duque de Caxias (loan) | 12 | (0) |
| 2011–2012 | CRB | 36 | (0) |
| 2013 | Novo Hamburgo | | |
| 2016–? | Serrano | | |
- * Club domestic league appearances and goals

Roberto Lopes Nascimento (born 16 August 1983), or simply Roberto Lopes, is a Brazilian former professional footballer who played as a defensive midfielder.
