= Alex Ferreira (footballer) =

Brazilian footballer (born 1986)

Personal information
- Full name: Alexsandro Ferreira
- Date of birth: January 10, 1986 (age 40)
- Place of birth: Curitiba, Brazil
- Height: 1.69 m (5 ft 7 in)
- Position: Right back

Team information
- Current team: Paraná

Youth career
- 2003–2004: Paraná

Senior career*
Years	Team	Apps	(Gls)
2005–2006	Paraná	7	(0)
- * Club domestic league appearances and goals

Alexsandro "Alex" Ferreira (born January 10, 1986), sometimes known as just Alex, is a Brazilian right back for Paraná in the Brazilian Série A.

== Contract ==
1 April 2007 to 1 April 2010
