= Dyego Coelho =

Brazilian footballer and manager (born 1983)

Personal information
- Full name: Dyego Rocha Coelho
- Date of birth: 22 March 1983 (age 43)
- Place of birth: São Paulo, Brazil
- Height: 1.79 m (5 ft 10 in)
- Position: Right-back

Team information
- Current team: Cuiabá U20 (head coach)

Youth career
- Corinthians

Senior career*
Years	Team	Apps	(Gls)
2003–2009	Corinthians	87	(12)
2007	→ Atlético Mineiro (loan)	28	(4)
2008	→ Atlético Mineiro (loan)	7	(3)
2008–2009	→ Bologna (loan)	14	(0)
2009–2010	Atlético Mineiro	10	(0)
2011	Karabükspor	10	(2)
2012	Bahia	0	(0)
2013	Guaratinguetá	12	(2)
2014	Atlético Sorocaba	3	(0)
Total		171	(23)

International career
2003	Brazil U20	2	(0)
2003	Brazil	1	(0)

Managerial career
- 2015–2016: Corinthians U20 (assistant)
- 2017–2018: Corinthians U20
- 2018: Corinthians (assistant)
- 2019: Guarani (assistant)
- 2019–2021: Corinthians U20
- 2019: Corinthians (interim)
- 2020: Corinthians (interim)
- 2021: Metropolitano
- 2021: Inter de Limeira
- 2022–2023: Portimonense U23
- 2025: São Bento
- 2025–: Cuiabá U20
- * Club domestic league appearances and goals

Dyego Rocha Coelho (born 22 March 1983) is a Brazilian professional football coach and former player who played as a right-back. He is the current head coach of Cuiabá's under-20 team.

== Playing career ==
Born in São Paulo, Coelho was a Corinthians youth graduate. He made his first team – and Série A – debut on 3 July 2003, in a 2–0 home loss against Atlético Mineiro.

Coelho became an important unit of the club during the 2005 Campeonato Brasileiro Série A winning campaign, but after scoring an own goal in the 2006 Copa Libertadores, he eventually lost his starting spot. He was loaned to Atlético Mineiro in the 2007 season, being an undisputed starter and scoring seven goals in all competitions. In September of that year, Coelho was banned for 120 days after he elbowed Kerlon while he was doing his seal trick. However, his ban was reduced to five matches on appeal.

Returning to Timão for the 2008 campaign, Coelho was rarely used and rejoined Atlético on loan on 16 February of that year. On 1 July, he moved abroad for the first time in his career and joined Bologna on a one-year loan deal.

On 20 August 2009, Coelho returned to Galo on a permanent deal. Rarely used, he was released by the club on 18 June of the following year, and subsequently represented Karabükspor, Bahia, Guaratinguetá and Atlético Sorocaba. He retired with the latter in 2014, aged 31.

Coelho received his first international cap for the Brazil national team as a 61st-minute substitute for Adriano in a 0–1 defeat to Mexico in the Gold Cup Final, as Brazil used an under-23 squad to compete in the tournament. He also represented the under-20s in the 2003 FIFA U-20 World Cup, and the under-23s in the 2003 Pan American Games.

== Managerial career ==
In 2015, shortly after retiring, Coelho returned to his first club, Corinthians, as the assistant of the under-20 squad. On 14 February 2017, as Osmar Loss was named Fábio Carille's assistant in the main squad, he took over the under-20s.

In November 2018, as Loss was named Guarani manager, Coelho was appointed assistant at the club. The following 15 April, he returned to Corinthians, again as manager of the under-20s.

On 3 November 2019, Coelho was appointed interim manager of Corinthians, as Carille was sacked. He was again an interim in September 2020, in the place of Tiago Nunes.

== Honours ==
Corinthians

- Campeonato Paulista: 2003
- Campeonato Brasileiro Série A: 2005

Atlético Mineiro

- Campeonato Mineiro: 2007, 2010

Bahia

- Campeonato Baiano: 2012

Brazil

- FIFA U-20 World Cup: 2003
