= Sérvulo (footballer) =

Brazilian footballer

Personal information
- Full name: Sérvulo Barbosa Bessa
- Date of birth: December 21, 1985 (age 40)
- Place of birth: Niterói, Brazil
- Height: 1.85 m (6 ft 1 in)
- Position: Goalkeeper

Youth career
- 2004–2005: São Gonçalo-RN

Senior career*
Years	Team	Apps	(Gls)
2006	São Gonçalo-RN		
2007	América-RN	13	(0)
2008	Atlético Mineiro		
2009	Bragantino	2	(0)
2010	Luverdense		
2010	Botafogo-PB		
2011	Central		
2011–?	Campinense		
- * Club domestic league appearances and goals

Sérvulo Barbosa Bessa, or simply Sérvulo (born December 21, 1985), is a Brazilian former professional footballer who played as a goalkeeper.
