= Nêgo (footballer) =

Brazilian footballer

Personal information
- Full name: Lindenbergh Francisco da Silva
- Date of birth: May 23, 1985 (age 41)
- Place of birth: Ceará-Mirim, Rio Grande do Norte, Brazil
- Height: 1.67 m (5 ft 6 in)
- Position: Right back

Team information
- Current team: Uberlândia

Youth career
- 2004–2005: ABC

Senior career*
Years	Team	Apps	(Gls)
2005–2007	ABC		
2006	→ América-MG (Loan)		
2007	→ Remo (Loan)		
2008–2010	Atlético Mineiro		
2008	→ Bragantino (Loan)		
2009	→ Ponte Preta (Loan)		
2009	→ São Caetano (Loan)	10	(0)
2010	→ Anapolina (Loan)		
2010–2011	Bragantino	23	(1)
2011–2012	ABC	20	(1)
2012	→ Vila Nova (Loan)	16	(0)
2012–	Uberlândia		
- * Club domestic league appearances and goals

Lindenbergh Francisco da Silva or simply Nêgo (born May 23, 1985 in Ceará Mirim-RN), is a Brazilian right back who currently plays for Uberlândia.

== Honours ==
- Rio Grande do Norte State League: 2005, 2007
- Pará State League: 2007
- Minas Gerais State League: 2007

== Contract ==
- Atlético Mineiro: 2 January 2008 to 31 December 2010
- ABC: 12 May 2011
