= Gustavo Breda =

Brazilian footballer (born 1986)

Personal information
- Full name: Gustavo Breda Rodrigues
- Date of birth: 2 May 1986 (age 40)
- Place of birth: Linhares, Brazil
- Height: 1.83 m (6 ft 0 in)
- Position: Central defender

Youth career
- 2004–2006: Vasco da Gama

Senior career*
Years	Team	Apps	(Gls)
2007–2008	Vasco da Gama		
2009	Linhares		
2009–2010	Rio Branco		
2010–2011	Icasa		
2011–2012	Americano		
2013	Jaguaré		
2014	Linhares		

Managerial career
- 2015: Linhares
- * Club domestic league appearances and goals

Gustavo Breda Rodrigues, sometimes known as just Breda (born 2 May 1986, in Linhares), is a Brazilian central defender.

He currently plays for Vasco after being promoted to the 1st team squad from the Under-20's for the 2007 season after signing 1st professional contract on 25 January 2006.

Breda made his 1st professional appearance for Vasco on 20 January 2007 in the 3–1 win over Portuguesa-RJ in the Rio State Championship.
