= Júnior (footballer, born 1986) =

Brazilian footballer

Personal information
- Full name: Antonio Augusto Ferreira Pinto Júnior
- Date of birth: February 28, 1986 (age 40)
- Place of birth: Rio de Janeiro, Brazil
- Height: 1.82 m (6 ft 0 in)
- Position: Defensive midfielder

Team information
- Current team: Bonsucesso

Youth career
- 2003–2004: Vasco da Gama

Senior career*
Years	Team	Apps	(Gls)
2004–2008	Vasco da Gama		
2006–2007	→ Estrela da Amadora (loan)		
2008	Arsenal Kyiv		
2008–2009	Grêmio Barueri		
2009–2010	America		
2010	Bonsucesso		
2010	Vila Nova		
2011	Moreirense		
2012	America		
2012–2013	Madureira		
2013	Al-Faisaly		
2016	Bangu		
2017	Sampaio Corrêa-RJ		
2018–	Bonsucesso		
- * Club domestic league appearances and goals

Antonio Augusto Ferreira Pinto Júnior or simply Júnior (born February 28, 1986), is a Brazilian defensive midfielder. He has played for Bonsucesso, and on June 11, 2008, he was announced to sign a contract with FC Arsenal Kyiv, which plays in the Ukrainian Premier League. However, he never paid for Arsenal and moved to Grêmio Recreativo Barueri in the same year.

On 16 July 2013 he moved to Al-Faisaly who played in Jordan Premier League.
