= Duque de Caxias Futebol Clube =

Duque de Caxias
- Full name: Duque de Caxias Futebol Clube
- Nicknames: Gigante Tricolor da Baixada; Tricolor; Duque
- Founded: March 8, 2005 (21 years ago)
- Ground: Marrentão
- Capacity: 3,334
- Chairman: Paulo César Sabino
- Head coach: Mário Junior
- League: Campeonato Carioca Série B1
- 2021: 9th of 12
Home colors	Away colors

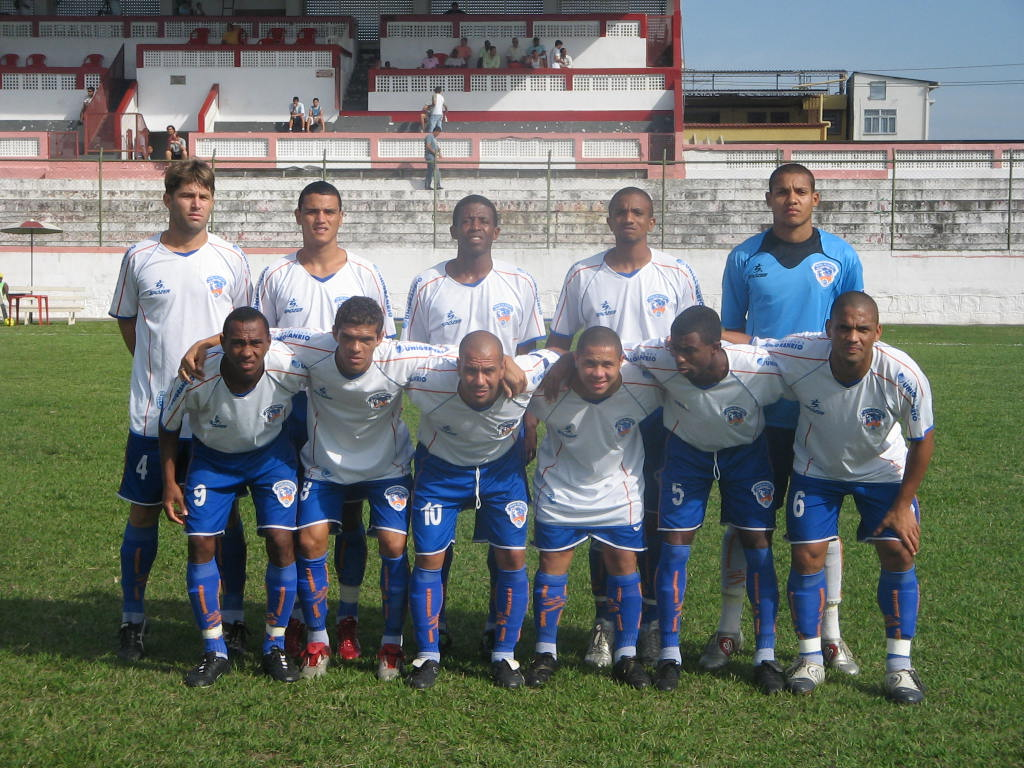
Team photo from the 2007 season

Duque de Caxias Futebol Clube, usually known simply as Duque de Caxias, is a Brazilian football team from the city of Duque de Caxias, Rio de Janeiro state. It currently plays in the Campeonato Carioca Série B1, the third tier of the Rio de Janeiro state league.

The club was founded on March 8, 2005.

== History ==
Tamoio Futebol Clube was founded on February 22, 1957, in Xerém, a district of Duque de Caxias, by local sportsmen.

On March 8, 2005, the mayor of Duque de Caxias, Washington Reis, refounded Tamoio Futebol Clube as Duque de Caxias Futebol Clube, with the purpose of increasing the club's visibility.

In 2008, Duque de Caxias finished in the 4th place in that season's Campeonato Brasileiro Série C, thus being promoted to the 2009 Campeonato Brasileiro Série B.

== Honours ==
=== Official tournaments ===
State
Competitions	Titles	Seasons
Copa Rio	1	2013
Campeonato Carioca Série B1	1	2023

=== Others tournaments ===
==== International ====
- BTV Cup (1): 2009

==== State ====
- Taça Corcovado (1): 2023

=== Runners-up ===
- Campeonato Carioca Série B1 (1): 1989

== Current squad ==
Note: Flags indicate national team as defined under FIFA eligibility rules; some limited exceptions apply. Players may hold more than one non-FIFA nationality.

No.	Pos.	Nation	Player
—	GK	BRA	Jaime
—	GK	BRA	Luciano
—	GK	BRA	Pedro
—	GK	BRA	Victor Hugo
—	DF	BRA	Dilsinho
—	DF	BRA	Emerson
—	DF	BRA	Matheus Guimarães
—	DF	BRA	Matheus Reis
—	DF	BRA	Rodrigo Lobão
—	DF	BRA	Zé Carlos
—	DF	BRA	Oziel
—	DF	BRA	Alan Pires
—	DF	BRA	Almir
—	DF	BRA	Magdiel
—	MF	BRA	Andrey Gradici
—	MF	BRA	Arthur Pelágio
—	MF	BRA	Igor Silva

No.	Pos.	Nation	Player
—	MF	BRA	Ronan
—	MF	BRA	Thiaguinho
—	MF	BRA	Wagner Carioca
—	MF	BRA	Alexandre Talento
—	MF	BRA	Alex Pixote
—	MF	BRA	Fábio Henrique
—	MF	BRA	Dilginton
—	FW	BRA	Alex Alcântara
—	FW	BRA	Bruno Veiga
—	FW	BRA	Felipe Augusto
—	FW	BRA	João Vitor
—	FW	BRA	Leandro Aguiar
—	FW	BRA	Marcos Vinícius
—	FW	BRA	Patrick
—	FW	BRA	Roger Fafá
—	FW	BRA	Tatá
—	FW	BRA	Victor Pantoja

== Stadium ==
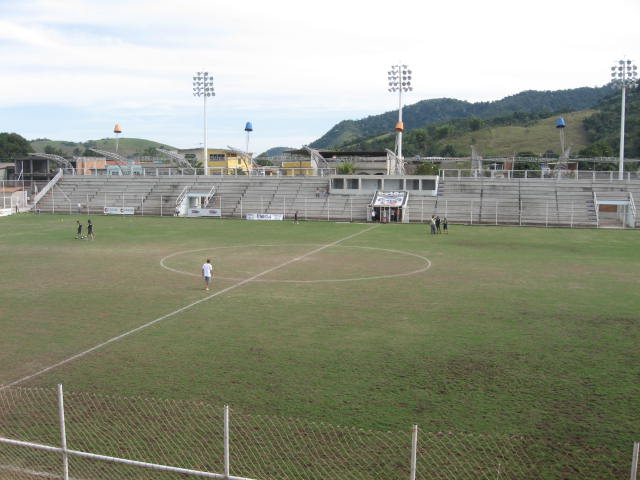
Estádio Romário de Souza Faria

Duque de Caxias plays its home games at Estádio Romário de Souza Faria, also known as Marrentão, which has a maximum capacity of 7,000 people. Marrentão replaced Estádio Mestre Telê Santana, also known as Maracanãzinho, as the club 's home ground.

== Colors ==
The official colors are orange, blue and white.
