= 2011 CR Flamengo season =

Flamengo
2011 season
- Chairwoman: Patrícia Amorim
- Manager: Vanderlei Luxemburgo
- Brazilian Série A: 4th
- Rio de Janeiro State League: Champions
- Copa do Brasil: Quarter-finals
- Copa Sudamericana: Round of 16
- Top goalscorer: League: Deivid (15 goals); All: Deivid, Ronaldinho, & Thiago Neves (21 each)
- Highest home attendance: 42,108 (vs. Nova Iguaçu in the Rio State League)
- Lowest home attendance: 4,266 (vs. Atlético Paranaense in the Copa Sudamericana)
Home colours	Away colours	Third colours

The 2011 season was the 116th year in the club's history, the 100th season in Clube de Regatas do Flamengo's football existence, and their 41st in the Campeonato Brasileiro Série A, having never been relegated from the top division.

== Club ==
=== First-team staff ===
Updated 23 May 2011.

Position	Name
Coach	Vanderlei Luxemburgo
Assistant coach	Antonio Lopes Junior
Goalkeeping coach	Cantarele
Fitness coaches	Antonio Mello
Fitness coaches	Diogo Linhares
Medical staff manager	José Luiz Runco
Doctors	Marcelo Soares
Doctors	Marcio Tannure
Doctors	Serafim Borges
Physiotherapists	Fabiano Bastos
Physiotherapists	Marcelo Martorelli
Physiologist	Paulo Figueiredo
Dietitian	Leonardo Acro
Psychologist	Paulo Ribeiro
Masseurs	Adenir Silva
Masseurs	Esmar Russo
Masseurs	Jorginho

=== Other information ===
Chairman	Patrícia Amorim
Ground (capacity and dimensions)	Engenhão (46,931 / 105x68 meters)

Source: CBF

=== First-team squad ===
As of 9 October 2011, according to combined sources on the official website.

Note: Flags indicate national team as defined under FIFA eligibility rules; some limited exceptions apply. Players may hold more than one non-FIFA nationality.

No.	Pos.	Nation	Player
1	GK	BRA	Felipe (on loan from Bragantino)
2	DF	BRA	Leonardo Moura (vice-captain)
3	DF	BRA	Welinton
4	DF	BRA	Ronaldo Angelim (vice-captain)
5	MF	CHI	Claudio Maldonado
6	DF	BRA	Júnior César
7	MF	BRA	Thiago Neves (on loan from Al-Hilal FC)
8	MF	BRA	Willians
9	FW	BRA	Deivid
10	MF	BRA	Ronaldinho (captain)
11	MF	BRA	Renato
14	DF	BRA	David Braz
15	FW	BRA	Diego Maurício
16	MF	CHI	Gonzalo Fierro
17	MF	BRA	Fernando
18	MF	ARG	Darío Bottinelli
19	FW	BRA	Guilherme Negueba
20	MF	BRA	Vander (on loan from Bahia)
21	DF	BRA	Rodrigo Alvim

No.	Pos.	Nation	Player
22	DF	BRA	Rafael Galhardo
23	MF	BRA	João Vitor
25	FW	BRA	Thomas
26	FW	BRA	Jael (on loan from Portuguesa)
27	GK	BRA	Paulo Victor
28	GK	BRA	Vinícius
29	FW	BRA	Rafinha
30	MF	BRA	Adryan
31	MF	BRA	Luiz Philipe
32	FW	BRA	Romário
34	DF	BRA	Digão
35	GK	BRA	César
37	DF	BRA	Gustavo
38	MF	BRA	Luiz Antônio
39	MF	BRA	Lorran
44	DF	BRA	Alex Silva
45	DF	BRA	Rodrigo Frauches
55	MF	BRA	Airton (on loan from S.L. Benfica)

Players with Dual Nationality

- (Brazil) (Portugal) Deivid
- (Brazil) (Spain) Ronaldinho
- (Argentina) (Italy) Darío Bottinelli
- (Brazil) (Italy) Thomas

=== Flamengo Youth Team ===
==== Professional players able to play in the youth team ====
Note: Flags indicate national team as defined under FIFA eligibility rules; some limited exceptions apply. Players may hold more than one non-FIFA nationality.

No.	Pos.	Nation	Player
15	FW	BRA	Diego Maurício
19	FW	BRA	Guilherme Negueba
22	DF	BRA	Rafael Galhardo
23	MF	BRA	João Vitor
25	FW	BRA	Thomas
29	FW	BRA	Rafinha
30	MF	BRA	Adryan
31	MF	BRA	Luiz Philipe Muralha

No.	Pos.	Nation	Player
32	FW	BRA	Romário
34	DF	BRA	Digão
35	GK	BRA	César
38	MF	BRA	Luiz Antônio
39	MF	BRA	Lorran
45	DF	BRA	Rodrigo Frauches
TBA	MF	BRA	Kaká (on loan from Tiradentes)

==== Youth players with first team experience ====
Note: Flags indicate national team as defined under FIFA eligibility rules; some limited exceptions apply. Players may hold more than one non-FIFA nationality.

No.	Pos.	Nation	Player
—	MF	BRA	Caio Quiroga
—	FW	BRA	Lucas Quintino

No.	Pos.	Nation	Player
—	FW	BRA	Yguinho

=== Out on loan ===
Note: Flags indicate national team as defined under FIFA eligibility rules; some limited exceptions apply. Players may hold more than one non-FIFA nationality.

No.	Pos.	Nation	Player
—	GK	BRA	Marcelo Lomba (loan to Bahia)
—	GK	BRA	Marcelo Carné (loan to Duque de Caxias)
—	GK	BRA	Diego Lima (loan to América (Teófilo Otoni))
—	DF	BRA	Marlon (loan to Náutico)
—	DF	BRA	Lucas Galdino (loan to Duque de Caxias)
—	DF	BRA	Christiano (loan to Avaí)
—	DF	BRA	Everton Silva (loan to Duque de Caxias)
—	DF	BRA	Vítor Saba (loan to Vitória)
—	DF	BRA	Jorbison (loan to Duque de Caxias)
—	DF	BRA	Egídio (loan to Ceará)
—	MF	BRA	Kléberson (loan to Atlético Paranaense)
—	MF	BRA	Rômulo (loan to Atlético Goianiense)

No.	Pos.	Nation	Player
—	MF	BRA	Antônio (loan to Duque de Caxias)
—	MF	BRA	Lenon (loan to Náutico)
—	MF	BRA	Vinícius Pacheco (loan to Red Star Belgrade)
—	MF	BRA	Willian Amendoim (loan to Ipatinga)
—	MF	BRA	Erick Flores (loan to Duque de Caxias)
—	MF	BRA	Guilherme Camacho (loan to Bahia)
—	MF	BRA	Eliabe (loan to Duque de Caxias)
—	MF	BRA	Carlyle (loan to CFZ de Brasília)
—	FW	BRA	Fabiano Oliveira (loan to Boluspor)
—	FW	BRA	Bruno Mezenga (loan to Red Star Belgrade)
—	FW	BRA	Paulo Sérgio (loan to Náutico)

== Transfers ==
=== In ===
Note: Flags indicate national team as defined under FIFA eligibility rules; some limited exceptions apply. Players may hold more than one non-FIFA nationality.

No.	Pos.	Nation	Player
—	DF	BRA	Egídio (loan return from Vitória)
—	GK	BRA	Felipe (loan from Bragantino until December 2011)
—	DF	BRA	Everton Silva (loan return from Ponte Preta)
—	MF	BRA	Lenon (loan return from Goiás)
—	MF	BRA	Rômulo (loan return from Atlético Goianiense)
—	MF	BRA	Guilherme Camacho (loan return from Goiás)
—	MF	BRA	Erick Flores (loan return from Náutico)
—	MF	BRA	Vinícius Pacheco (loan return from Figueirense)
—	MF	ARG	Darío Bottinelli (transfer from Atlas)
—	MF	BRA	Vander (loan from Bahia until December 2011)
—	FW	BRA	Wanderley (transfer from Cruzeiro)
—	MF	BRA	Ronaldinho (transfer from A.C. Milan)
—	MF	BRA	Vítor Saba (loan return from Macaé)

No.	Pos.	Nation	Player
—	DF	BRA	Gustavo (transfer from Boavista)
—	DF	BRA	Everton Silva (loan return from Boavista)
—	MF	BRA	Erick Flores (loan return from Boavista)
—	MF	BRA	Kaká (loan from Tiradentes until December 2011)
—	GK	BRA	Marcelo Carné (loan return from Boavista)
—	DF	BRA	Marlon (loan return from Duque de Caxias)
—	DF	BRA	Júnior César (transfer from São Paulo)
—	MF	BRA	Vinícius Pacheco (loan return from Grêmio)
—	MF	BRA	Airton (on loan from S.L. Benfica until June 2012)
—	FW	BRA	Paulo Sérgio (loan return from Estoril)
—	MF	BRA	Lenon (loan return from Duque de Caxias)
—	FW	BRA	Jael (on loan from Portuguesa until May 2012)
—	DF	BRA	Alex Silva (transfer from Hamburger SV)

=== Out ===
Note: Flags indicate national team as defined under FIFA eligibility rules; some limited exceptions apply. Players may hold more than one non-FIFA nationality.

No.	Pos.	Nation	Player
—	MF	BRA	Michael (loan return to Dynamo Kyiv)
—	MF	BRA	Léo Medeiros (end of contract)
—	DF	BRA	Juan (end of contract)
—	MF	BRA	Lenon (loan to Duque de Caxias until December 2011)
—	MF	BRA	Antônio (loan to Duque de Caxias until December 2011)
—	DF	BRA	Lucas Galdino (loan to Duque de Caxias until December 2011)
—	DF	BRA	Marlon (loan to Duque de Caxias until December 2011)
—	MF	BRA	Erick Flores (loan to Boavista until May 2011)
—	GK	BRA	Marcelo Carné (loan to Boavista until May 2011)
—	DF	BRA	Everton Silva (loan to Boavista)
—	MF	BRA	Rômulo (loan to Atlético Goianiense until December 2011)
—	MF	BRA	Guilherme Camacho (loan to Bahia until December 2011)
—	FW	BRA	Juninho (end of contract)
—	GK	BRA	Marcelo Valverde (end of contract)
—	MF	BRA	Wellington Pecka (end of contract)
—	MF	BRA	Talles (end of contract)
—	MF	BRA	Vander (end of contract)
—	MF	BRA	Rodrigo Broa (end of contract)
—	MF	BRA	Vítor Saba (loan to Macaé)
—	MF	BRA	Vinícius Pacheco (loan to Grêmio until December 2011)
—	FW	BRA	Diogo (loan return to Olympiacos F.C.)
—	DF	BRA	Christiano (loan to Avaí until December 2011)
—	MF	BRA	Carlyle (loan to CFZ de Brasília)
—	DF	BRA	Uendel (loan return to Grêmio)

No.	Pos.	Nation	Player
—	MF	BRA	Willian Amendoim (loan to Ipatinga)
—	GK	BRA	Diego Lima (loan to América (Teófilo Otoni) until May 2011)
—	DF	BRA	Everton Silva (loan to Boavista until May 2011)
—	MF	BRA	Kléberson (loan to Atlético Paranaense until December 2011)
—	MF	BRA	Vítor Saba (loan to Vitória until December 2011)
—	DF	BRA	Henrique (end of contract)
—	DF	BRA	Marllon (loan to Duque de Caxias until December 2011)
—	DF	BRA	Everton Silva (loan to Duque de Caxias until December 2011)
—	DF	BRA	Jorbison (loan to Duque de Caxias until December 2011)
—	MF	BRA	Erick Flores (loan to Duque de Caxias until December 2011)
—	MF	BRA	Eliabe (loan to Duque de Caxias until December 2011)
—	GK	BRA	Marcelo Carné (loan to Duque de Caxias until December 2011)
—	GK	BRA	Marcelo Lomba (loan to Bahia until May 2012)
—	DF	BRA	Marlon (loan to Náutico until December 2011)
—	MF	SRB	Dejan Petković (retired)
—	MF	BRA	Vinícius Pacheco (loan to Red Star Belgrade until May 2012)
—	MF	BRA	Marquinhos (on loan return to Desportivo Brasil)
—	FW	BRA	Paulo Sérgio (loan to Náutico until December 2011)
—	MF	BRA	Lenon (loan to Náutico until December 2011)
—	MF	BRA	Corrêa (on loan return to Dynamo Kyiv)
—	DF	BRA	Egídio (loan to Ceará until December 2011)
—	FW	BRA	Wanderley (transfer to Al-Arabi)
—	DF	BRA	Jean (Released)

== Statistics ==
=== Appearances and goals ===
Last updated on 5 December 2011.

- Players in italic have left the club during the season.

No.	Pos	Nat	Player	Total		Rio State League		Copa do Brasil		Copa Sudamericana		Série A	
No.	Pos	Nat	Player	Apps	Goals	Apps	Goals	Apps	Goals	Apps	Goals	Apps	Goals
1	GK	(Brazil) BRA	Felipe	63	0	19	0	6	0	3	0	35	0
2	DF	(Brazil) BRA	Leonardo Moura	58	1	17	1	4	0	1+1	0	35	0
3	DF	(Brazil) BRA	Welinton	56	1	17	0	6	0	1+1	0	31	1
4	DF	(Brazil) BRA	Ronaldo Angelim	29	0	4+3	0	3+1	0	3	0	14+1	0
5	MF	(Chile) CHI	Claudio Maldonado	25	0	12	0	3	0	1+1	0	5+3	0
6	DF	(Brazil) BRA	Egídio	17	1	10+1	0	1+2	0	0	0	3	1
6	DF	(Brazil) BRA	Júnior César	35	0	0	0	0	0	2	0	32+1	0
7	MF	(Brazil) BRA	Thiago Neves	57	21	15+1	7	6	2	1+1	0	33	12
8	MF	(Brazil) BRA	Willians	56	2	17	0	6	1	1+1	0	30+1	1
9	FW	(Brazil) BRA	Deivid	52	21	11+4	5	3	1	1	0	28+5	15
10	MF	(Brazil) BRA	Ronaldinho	52	21	13	4	5	1	1+2	2	31	14
11	MF	(Brazil) BRA	Renato	62	9	17	2	6	2	1+2	0	36	5
13	DF	(Brazil) BRA	Jean	7	1	2+2	1	0	0	0	0	0+3	0
14	DF	(Brazil) BRA	David Braz	41	1	17	1	5	0	3	0	12+4	0
15	FW	(Brazil) BRA	Diego Maurício	36	3	1+8	1	0+4	1	1+1	0	2+19	1
16	MF	(Chile) CHI	Gonzalo Fierro	30	0	2+10	0	0+5	0	2	0	2+9	0
17	MF	(Brazil) BRA	Fernando	11	0	6+3	0	0	0	0	0	0+2	0
18	MF	(Argentina) ARG	Darío Bottinelli	43	5	6+4	0	2+2	0	3	0	15+11	5
19	MF	(Brazil) BRA	Guilherme Negueba	30	2	2+5	1	1+2	1	2	0	1+17	0
20	MF	(Brazil) BRA	Vander	8	1	5	1	0	0	1	0	0+2	0
21	DF	(Brazil) BRA	Rodrigo Alvim	13	0	6	0	2+1	0	1	0	2+1	0
22	DF	(Brazil) BRA	Rafael Galhardo	12	1	3+1	0	2	1	0+1	0	3+2	0
23	MF	(Brazil) BRA	João Vitor	2	0	0+1	0	0	0	0	0	0+1	0
25	FW	(Brazil) BRA	Marquinhos	4	0	1+3	0	0	0	0	0	0	0
25	FW	(Brazil) BRA	Thomas	9	0	0	0	0	0	0	0	4+5	0
26	FW	(Brazil) BRA	Jael	20	4	0	0	0	0	3+1	0	4+12	4
27	GK	(Brazil) BRA	Paulo Victor	4	0	0	0	0	0	1	0	3	0
28	GK	(Brazil) BRA	Vinícius	0	0	0	0	0	0	0	0	0	0
29	GK	(Brazil) BRA	Marcelo Lomba	0	0	0	0	0	0	0	0	0	0
29	FW	(Brazil) BRA	Rafinha	0	0	0	0	0	0	0	0	0	0
30	MF	(Brazil) BRA	Adryan	0	0	0	0	0	0	0	0	0	0
31	MF	(Brazil) BRA	Luiz Philipe Muralha	15	0	0+1	0	0+1	0	0	0	3+10	0
32	FW	(Brazil) BRA	Romário	0	0	0	0	0	0	0	0	0	0
33	FW	(Brazil) BRA	Wanderley	23	7	4+8	4	5	3	0	0	5+1	0
34	DF	(Brazil) BRA	Digão	0	0	0	0	0	0	0	0	0	0
35	GK	(Brazil) BRA	César	0	0	0	0	0	0	0	0	0	0
36	DF	(Brazil) BRA	Marllon	0	0	0	0	0	0	0	0	0	0
37	DF	(Brazil) BRA	Gustavo	6	0	0	0	0	0	3	0	3	0
38	MF	(Brazil) BRA	Luiz Antônio	11	0	0	0	0	0	2	0	7+2	0
39	MF	(Brazil) BRA	Lorran	1	0	1	0	0	0	0	0	0	0
43	MF	(Serbia) SRB	Dejan Petković	1	0	0	0	0	0	0	0	1	0
44	DF	(Brazil) BRA	Alex Silva	18	0	0	0	0	0	1	0	17	0
55	MF	(Brazil) BRA	Airton	19	0	0	0	0	0	2	0	17	0
–	DF	(Brazil) BRA	Anderson	0	0	0	0	0	0	0	0	0	0
–	DF	(Brazil) BRA	Henrique	0	0	0	0	0	0	0	0	0	0

=== Top scorers ===
Includes all competitive matches

Position	Nation	Number	Name	Rio State League	Copa do Brasil	Copa Sudamericana	Série A	Total
1	(Brazil)	9	Deivid	5	1	0	15	21
1	(Brazil)	10	Ronaldinho	4	1	2	14	21
1	(Brazil)	7	Thiago Neves	7	2	0	12	21
2	(Brazil)	11	Renato	2	2	0	5	9
3	(Brazil)	33	Wanderley	4	3	0	0	7
4	(Argentina)	18	Darío Bottinelli	0	0	0	5	5
5	(Brazil)	26	Jael	0	0	0	4	4
6	(Brazil)	15	Diego Maurício	1	1	0	1	3
7	(Brazil)	8	Willians	0	1	0	1	2
7	(Brazil)	19	Guilherme Negueba	1	1	0	0	2
8	(Brazil)	3	Welinton	0	0	0	1	1
8	(Brazil)	6	Egídio	0	0	0	1	1
8	(Brazil)	22	Rafael Galhardo	0	1	0	0	1
8	(Brazil)	2	Leonardo Moura	1	0	0	0	1
8	(Brazil)	4	Ronaldo Angelim	1	0	0	0	1
8	(Brazil)	13	Jean	1	0	0	0	1
8	(Brazil)	14	David Braz	1	0	0	0	1
8	(Brazil)	20	Vander	1	0	0	0	1
			Own Goal	1	0	0	0	1
			Total	30	13	2	59	103

=== Clean sheets ===
Includes all competitive matches

Position	Nation	Number	Name	Rio State League	Copa do Brasil	Copa Sudamericana	Série A	Total
GK	(Brazil)	1	Felipe	10	3	2	12	27
GK	(Brazil)	27	Paulo Victor	0	0	0	1	1
GK	(Brazil)	28	Vinícius	0	0	0	0	0
GK	(Brazil)	29	Marcelo Lomba	0	0	0	0	0
GK	(Brazil)	35	César	0	0	0	0	0
			Total	10	3	2	13	28

=== Disciplinary record ===
Position	Nation	Number	Name	Rio State League		Copa do Brasil		Copa Sudamericana		Série A		Total	
Position	Nation	Number	Name	Booked	Sent off (straight red)	Booked	Sent off (straight red)	Booked	Sent off (straight red)	Booked	Sent off (straight red)	Booked	Sent off (straight red)
GK	(Brazil)	1	Felipe	2	0	1	0	0	0	2	0	5	0
DF	(Brazil)	2	Leonardo Moura	3	03333	0	0444	0	0444556	3	0896	6	0
DF	(Brazil)	3	Welinton	5	0	2	0	1	0	6	1	14	1
DF	(Brazil)	4	Ronaldo Angelim	0	0	1	1	1	0	5	0	7	1
MF	(Chile)	5	Claudio Maldonado	5	0	1	0	0	0	3	0	9	0
DF	(Brazil)	6	Egídio	1	0	3	0	0	0	1	0	5	0
DF	(Brazil)	6	Júnior César	0	0	0	0	0	0	6	0	6	0
MF	(Brazil)	7	Thiago Neves	5	0	1	0	0	0	6	0	12	0
MF	(Brazil)	8	Willians	7	1	2	0	1	0	11	1	21	2
FW	(Brazil)	9	Deivid	2	0	0	0	0	0	2	0	4	0
MF	(Brazil)	10	Ronaldinho	5	0	1	0	0	0	11	1	17	1
MF	(Brazil)	11	Renato	5	0	0	0	1	0	8	1	14	1
DF	(Brazil)	13	Jean	0	0	0	0	0	0	0	0	0	0
DF	(Brazil)	14	David Braz	4	1	2	0	2	0	1	0	9	1
FW	(Brazil)	15	Diego Maurício	0	0	0	0	0	0	0	0	0	0
MF	(Chile)	16	Gonzalo Fierro	1	0	0	0	0	0	1	0	2	0
MF	(Brazil)	17	Fernando	1	0	0	0	0	0	0	0	1	0
MF	(Argentina)	18	Darío Bottinelli	4	0	0	0	0	0	4	1	8	1
MF	(Brazil)	19	Guilherme Negueba	0	0	0	0	0	0	4	0	4	0
MF	(Brazil)	20	Vander	0	0	0	0	1	0	0	0	1	0
DF	(Brazil)	21	Rodrigo Alvim	2	0	0	0	0	0	1	0	3	0
DF	(Brazil)	22	Rafael Galhardo	2	0	1	0	0	0	0	0	3	0
MF	(Brazil)	23	João Vitor	0	0	0	0	0	0	0	0	0	0
MF	(Brazil)	25	Marquinhos	0	0	0	0	0	0	1	0	1	0
FW	(Brazil)	25	Thomas	0	0	0	0	0	0	0	0	0	0
FW	(Brazil)	26	Jael	0	0	0	0	0	0	1	0	1	0
GK	(Brazil)	27	Paulo Victor	0	0	0	0	0	0	1	0	1	0
GK	(Brazil)	28	Vinícius	0	0	0	0	0	0	0	0	0	0
GK	(Brazil)	29	Marcelo Lomba	0	0	0	0	0	0	0	0	0	0
FW	(Brazil)	29	Rafinha	0	0	0	0	0	0	0	0	0	0
MF	(Brazil)	30	Adryan	0	0	0	0	0	0	0	0	0	0
MF	(Brazil)	31	Luiz Philipe Muralha	0	0	0	0	0	0	3	0	3	0
FW	(Brazil)	32	Romário	0	0	0	0	0	0	0	0	0	0
FW	(Brazil)	33	Wanderley	0	0	0	0	0	0	0	0	0	0
DF	(Brazil)	34	Digão	0	0	0	0	0	0	0	0	0	0
GK	(Brazil)	35	César	0	0	0	0	0	0	0	0	0	0
DF	(Brazil)	36	Marllon	0	0	0	0	0	0	0	0	0	0
DF	(Brazil)	37	Gustavo	0	0	0	0	1	0	2	0	3	0
MF	(Brazil)	38	Luiz Antônio	0	0	0	0	0	0	0	0	0	0
MF	(Brazil)	39	Lorran	0	0	0	0	0	0	0	0	0	0
MF	(Serbia)	43	Dejan Petković	0	0	0	0	0	0	0	0	0	0
DF	(Brazil)	44	Alex Silva	0	0	0	0	0	0	8	0	8	0
MF	(Brazil)	55	Airton	0	0	0	0	0	1	6	0	6	1
DF	(Brazil)	–	Anderson	0	0	0	0	0	0	0	0	0	0
DF	(Brazil)	–	Henrique	0	0	0	0	0	0	0	0	0	0
			Total	55	2	15	1	8	1	97	5	174	9

=== Overview ===
Competition	First match	Last match	Starting round	Final position	Record							
Competition	First match	Last match	Starting round	Final position	Pld	W	D	L	GF	GA	GD	Win %
Série A	20 April 2011	7 December 2011	Matchday 1	4th	38	15	16	7	59	47	+12	39.47
Copa do Brasil	16 February 2011	11 May 2011	First round	Quarterfinals	6	3	2	1	13	5	+8	50.00
Campeonato Carioca	19 January 2011	1 May 2011	Matchday 1	Winners	19	12	7	0	29	12	+17	63.16
Copa Sudamericana	10 August 2011	26 October 2011	Second stage	Round of 16	4	2	0	2	2	5	−3	50.00
Total					67	32	25	10	103	69	+34	47.76

Source: Competitions

== Competitions ==
=== Pre-season friendlies ===
9 February	Flamengo	0–0	Londrina	Londrina
17:00 UTC−03:00		(Report)		Stadium: Estádio do Café; Attendance: N/A; Referee: N/A

16 February	Flamengo	2–1	América (MG)	Londrina
17:00 UTC−03:00	Vander 2'; Darío Bottinelli 83'	(Report)	Gabriel 16'; Gabriel (yellow card)	Stadium: Estádio do Café; Attendance: N/A; Referee: Antonio Denival de Moraes

=== Campeonato Carioca ===
==== Taça Guanabara ====
Pos	Team	Pld	W	D	L	GF	GA	GD	Pts	Qualification
1	Flamengo	7	7	0	0	14	4	+10	21	Advanced to the Semifinals
2	Boavista	7	4	1	2	15	11	+4	13	Advanced to the Semifinals
3	Resende	7	4	1	2	9	5	+4	13	Advanced to the Troféu Washington Rodrigues
4	Nova Iguaçu	7	3	2	2	12	11	+1	11	Advanced to the Troféu Washington Rodrigues
5	Vasco da Gama	7	2	1	4	16	9	+7	7	
6	Volta Redonda	7	1	2	4	4	7	−3	5	
7	Americano	7	1	2	4	7	14	−7	5	
8	America	7	1	1	5	6	22	−16	4	

Updated to match(es) played on 13 February. Source:
Rules for classification: 1 points; 2 wins; 3 goal difference; 4 goals scored; 5 red cards received; 6 yellow cards received; 7 draw

===== Matches =====
19 January 1	Flamengo	2–0	Volta Redonda	Rio de Janeiro
22:00 UTC−03:00	Vander 41'; Wanderley 60'	(Report)	Fabinho (yellow card) 83'	Stadium: Estádio Olímpico João Havelange (Engenhão); Attendance: 7,804; Referee: Pathrice Maia

22 January 2	America	1–3	Flamengo	Rio de Janeiro
17:00 UTC−03:00	Leandrinho 68'	(Report)	Renato 11'; David Braz 32'; Deivid 51'; Weliton (yellow card) 70'; David Braz (yellow card) 73'	Stadium: Estádio Giulite Coutinho; Attendance: 7,832; Referee: Gutemberg de Paula Fonseca

26 January 3	Flamengo	2–0	Americano	Macaé
19:30 UTC−03:00	Wanderley 68', 71'; Léo Moura (yellow card) 58'	(Report)	Elson (yellow card) 1'; Felipe (yellow card) 3' (yellow-red card) 19'; Diego Neves (yellow card) 61'	Stadium: Estádio Cláudio Moacyr; Attendance: 10,000; Referee: Rodrigo Carvalhaes de Miranda

30 January 4	Vasco da Gama	1–2	Flamengo	Rio de Janeiro
19:30 UTC−03:00	Rômulo 75'; Anderson Martins (yellow card) 39'; Fernando Prass (yellow card) 39'; Marcel (yellow card) 49'; Fagner (yellow card) 55'; Eduardo Costa (yellow card) 72'	(Report)	Deivid 22'; Thiago Neves 43'; Renato (yellow card) 34'; Claudio Maldonado (yellow card) 60'	Stadium: Estádio Olímpico João Havelange (Engenhão); Attendance: 15,356; Referee: Marcelo de Lima Henrique

2 February 5	Flamengo	1–0	Nova Iguaçu	Rio de Janeiro
22:00 UTC−03:00	Wanderley 85'; Thiago Neves (yellow card) 47'; Claudio Maldonado (yellow card) 56'; Welinton (yellow card) 62'	(Report)	Amaral (yellow card) 36'; Alex Moraes (yellow card) 42'; Diogo Silva (yellow card) 77'; Bruno Cortês (yellow card) 84'	Stadium: Estádio Olímpico João Havelange (Engenhão); Attendance: 42,108; Referee: Wagner dos Santos Magalhães

6 February 6	Boavista	2–3	Flamengo	Macaé
17:00 UTC−03:00	Frontini 51', 78'; Thiago (yellow card) 23'; Frontini (yellow card) 23'	(Report)	Ronaldinho 24' (pen.); Deivid 49'; Guilherme Negueba 83'; Claudio Maldonado (yellow card) 33'; Renato (yellow card) 54'; Ronaldinho (yellow card) 68'; Deivid (yellow card) 70'; Fernando (yellow card) 72'; Welinton (yellow card) 75'	Stadium: Estádio Cláudio Moacyr; Attendance: 10,000; Referee: Carlos Eduardo Nunes Braga

13 February 7	Flamengo	1–0	Resende	Macaé
17:00	Deivid 76'; Willians (yellow card) 12'	(Report)		Stadium: Estádio Cláudio Moacyr; Attendance: 6,684; Referee: Marcelo de Lima Henrique

=== Semifinal ===
20 February	Flamengo	1–1 (3–1 p)	Botafogo	Rio de Janeiro
16:00 UTC−03:00	Ronaldo Angelim 14'; Willians (yellow card) 10'; Deivid (yellow card) 19'; David Braz (yellow card) 30'; Thiago Neves (yellow card) 89'	(report)	Sebastián Abreu 48'; Germán Herrera (yellow card) 10'; Renato Cajá (yellow card) 71'; Rodrigo Mancha (yellow card) 80'	Stadium: Estádio Olímpico João Havelange (Engenhão); Attendance: 30.553; Referee: Luís Antonio Silva Santos
	Penalties
	(penalty scored) Leonardo Moura; (penalty scored) Renato; (penalty scored) Fernando		Márcio Rozário (penalty scored); Éverton (penalty missed); Somália (penalty missed); Renato Cajá (penalty missed)

=== Final ===
27 February	Flamengo	1–0	Boavista	Rio de Janeiro
16:00 UTC−03:00	Ronaldinho 71'; Renato (yellow card) 21'; Ronaldinho (yellow card) 56'	(report)	Leandro Chaves (yellow card) 7'; Júlio César (yellow card) 46'; Edu Pina (yellow card) 70'; Gustavo (yellow card) 74'; Frontini (red card); Santiago (yellow card) 83'	Stadium: Estádio Olímpico João Havelange (Engenhão); Attendance: 41.703; Referee: Marcelo de Lima Henrique

==== Taça Rio ====
Pos	Team	Pld	W	D	L	GF	GA	GD	Pts	Qualification
1	Vasco da Gama	8	5	2	1	19	10	+9	17	Advanced to the Semifinals
2	Flamengo	8	4	4	0	13	7	+6	16	Advanced to the Semifinals
3	Americano	8	4	2	2	10	14	−4	14	Advanced to the Troféu Carlos Alberto Torres
4	Boavista	8	4	1	3	13	8	+5	13	Advanced to the Troféu Carlos Alberto Torres
5	Volta Redonda	8	3	2	3	11	12	−1	11	
6	Resende	8	2	2	4	12	12	0	8	
7	Nova Iguaçu	8	2	1	5	7	12	−5	7	
8	America	8	1	1	6	7	15	−8	4	

Updated to match(es) played on 9 April. Source:
Rules for classification: 1 points; 2 wins; 3 goal difference; 4 goals scored; 5 red cards received; 6 yellow cards received; 7 draw

===== Matches =====
5 March 1	Flamengo	3–2	Olaria	Volta Redonda
16:20 UTC−03:00	Thiago Neves (yellow card) 36' (goal) 45+1', 70'; Ronaldinho 48'; David Braz (yellow card) 8' (yellow-red card) 66'	(Report)	Danilo Alves 5'; Rafael 86'; Henrique (yellow card) 16'	Stadium: Estádio Raulino de Oliveira; Attendance: 6,779; Referee: Rodrigo Cavalhães de Miranda

10 March 2	Bangu	1–2	Flamengo	Macaé
19:30 UTC−03:00	Pipico 26' (pen.); André Barreto (yellow card) 7'; Ricardinho (yellow card) 18'	(Report)	Ronaldinho 24' (pen.); Diego Maurício 90+5'; Léo Moura (yellow card) 18'; Willians (yellow card) 40'; Darío Bottinelli (yellow card) 52'; Ronaldinho (yellow card) 87'	Stadium: Estádio Cláudio Moacyr; Attendance: 6.958; Referee: Djalma Beltrami

13 March 3	Flamengo	0–0	Fluminense	Rio de Janeiro
18:30 UTC−03:00	Thiago Neves (yellow card) 4'; Ronaldinho (yellow card) 55'; Renato (yellow card) 65'	(Report)	Emerson (yellow card) 41'; Carlinhos (yellow card) 44'; Diguinho (yellow card) 58'	Stadium: Estádio Olímpico João Havelange (Engenhão); Attendance: 26.131; Referee: Pathrice Maia

20 March 4	Cabofriense	0–0	Flamengo	Macaé
16:00 UTC−03:00	Everton (yellow card) 36'; Assumpção (yellow card) 67'; Luciano Totó (yellow card) 72'; Allan (yellow card) 77'; Léo Itaperuna (yellow card) 83'	(Report)	Welinton (yellow card) 23'; David Braz (yellow card) 24'; Darío Bottinelli (yellow card) 45+1'; Egídio (yellow card) 68'; Léo Moura (yellow card) 76'; Willians (yellow card) 84'; Renato (yellow card) 86'	Stadium: Estádio Cláudio Moacyr; Attendance: 2.247; Referee: Rodrigo Nunes

27 March 5	Flamengo	3–3	Madureira	Macaé
16:00 UTC−03:00	Léo Moura 43'; Deivid 74'; Thiago Neves 82'; Darío Bottinelli (yellow card) 69'	(Report)	Welinton 34' (o.g.); Michel (yellow card) 54'; Baiano 63'; Abedi (yellow card) 55'	Stadium: Estádio Cláudio Moacyr; Attendance: 5.073 (only payers); Referee: Pathrice Maia

2 April 6	Duque de Caxias	0–2	Flamengo	Rio de Janeiro
18:30 UTC−03:00	Renato 73'; Hamilton 73' (o.g.); Willians (yellow card) 51'	(Report)	Lenílson (yellow card) 26'; Juninho (yellow card) 29'; Vítor (yellow card) 49'; Hamilton (yellow card) 87'	Stadium: Estádio Olímpico João Havelange (Engenhão); Attendance: 11.791; Referee: Lenilton Rodrigues Gomes Júnior

10 April 7	Botafogo	0–2	Flamengo	Rio de Janeiro
18:30 UTC−03:00	Germán Herrera (yellow card) 30'; Somália (yellow card) 50'; Éverton (yellow card) 72'; Arévalo Ríos (yellow card) 77'; João Filipe (yellow card) 87'; Antônio Carlos (yellow card) 89'; Sebastián Abreu (yellow card) 90'	(Report)	Thiago Neves 34', 88'; Willians (yellow card) 9'; Welinton (yellow card) 31'; Ronaldinho (yellow card) 39'; Claudio Maldonado (yellow card) 45'; David Braz (yellow card) 48'; Felipe (yellow card) 90+2'	Stadium: Estádio Olímpico João Havelange (Engenhão); Attendance: 21.422; Referee: Wagner do Nascimento

17 April 8	Flamengo	1–1	Macaé	Volta Redonda
16:00 UTC−03:00	Jean 55'; Claudio Maldonado (yellow card) 26'; Felipe (yellow card) 43'; Gonzalo Fierro (yellow card) 47'	(Report)	Hyantony 78'; Bruno Luiz (yellow card) 31'; Marcos (yellow card) 90+2'	Stadium: Estádio Raulino de Oliveira; Attendance: 5.330; Referee: Philip Georg Bennett

=== Semifinal ===
24 April	Fluminense	1–1 (4–5 p)	Flamengo	Rio de Janeiro
16:00	Rafael Moura 21'; Rafael Moura (yellow card) 7'; Mariano (yellow card) 25'; Fred (yellow card) 26'; Júlio César (yellow card) 52'; Marquinho (yellow card) 83'	(Report)	Thiago Neves 66'; Rafael Galhardo (yellow card) 21'; Thiago Neves (yellow card) 23'; Willians (yellow card) 25'; Rodrigo Alvim (yellow card) 74'	Stadium: Estádio Olímpico João Havelange (Engenhão); Attendance: 23.915; Referee: Péricles Bassols
	Penalties
	(penalty scored) Fred; (penalty missed) Souza; (penalty scored) Edinho; (penalty scored) Darío Conca; (penalty missed) Araújo; (penalty scored) Gum; (penalty missed) Tartá		Renato (penalty missed); Deivid (penalty scored); Rafael Galhardo (penalty scored); Darío Bottinelli (penalty scored); Thiago Neves (penalty missed); David Braz (penalty scored); Diego Maurício (penalty scored)

=== Final ===
1 May	Vasco da Gama	0–0 (1–3 p)	Flamengo	Rio de Janeiro
16:00	Fellipe Bastos (yellow card) 49'; Alecsandro (yellow card) 74'; Élton (yellow card) 87'; Bernardo (yellow card) 88'; Allan (red card)	(Report)	Darío Bottinelli (yellow card) 16'; Rodrigo Alvim (yellow card) 30'; Rafael Galhardo (yellow card) 64'; Willians (red card)	Stadium: Estádio Olímpico João Havelange (Engenhão); Attendance: 39.029; Referee: Luiz Antônio Silva dos Santos
	Penalties
	(penalty scored) Alecsandro; (penalty missed) Bernardo; (penalty missed) Fellipe Bastos; (penalty missed) Élton		Renato (penalty scored); Gonzalo Fierro (penalty missed); Fernando (penalty scored); Thiago Neves (penalty scored)

=== First round ===
16 February	Murici (Alagoas)	0–3	(Rio de Janeiro (state)) Flamengo	Maceió
21:50 (UTC−03:00)	Edvaldo (yellow card) 71'	Report	Ronaldinho 66'; Renato 72'; Guilherme Negueba 90'; Egídio (yellow card) 76'	Stadium: Estádio Rei Pelé; Attendance: 15,100; Referee: Jailson Macedo Freitas (Bahia)

=== Second round ===
16 March	Fortaleza (Ceará)	0–3	(Rio de Janeiro (state)) Flamengo	Fortaleza
21:50 (UTC−03:00)	Roniery (yellow card) 72'	Report	Renato 20'; Wanderley 70'; Diego Maurício 90+1'; David Braz (yellow card) 24'; Egídio (yellow card) 42'	Stadium: Estádio Plácido Aderaldo Castelo (Castelão); Attendance: N/A; Referee: Nielson Nogueira Dias

=== Round of 16 ===
20 April First leg	Flamengo (Rio de Janeiro (state))	1–1	(Ceará) Horizonte	Rio de Janeiro
21:50 (UTC−03:00)	Wanderley 17'; Claudio Maldonado (yellow card) 29'; Ronaldinho (yellow card) 31'; Willians (yellow card) 70'; Thiago Neves (yellow card) 72'; Welinton (yellow card) 84'	Report	Elanardo 38'; Valter (yellow card) 32'; Alex (yellow card) 80'; Carlinhos (yellow card) 89'; Régis (yellow card) 82' (yellow-red card) 90+4'	Stadium: Estádio Olímpico joão Havelange (Engenhão); Attendance: 9.029; Referee: Wagner Reway

27 April Second leg	Horizonte (Ceará)	0–3 (1–4 agg.)	(Rio de Janeiro (state)) Flamengo	Horizonte
21:50 (UTC−03:00)	Carlinhos (yellow card) 21'; Hércules (yellow card) 57' (yellow-red card) 74'; Siloé (yellow card) 63'	Report	Rafael Galhardo 8'; Deivid 48'; Willians 80'; David Braz (yellow card) 23'; Rafael Galhardo (yellow card) 86'	Stadium: Estádio José Domingos Neto (Domingão); Attendance: N/A; Referee: Heber Roberto Lopes

=== Quarterfinals ===
5 May First leg	Flamengo (Rio de Janeiro (state))	1–2	Ceará	Rio de Janeiro
21:50 (UTC−03:00)	Wanderley 75'	Report	Marcelo Nicácio 43'; Geraldo 65'; Geraldo (yellow card) 31'; Fernando Henrique (yellow card) 38'	Stadium: Estádio Olímpico joão Havelange (Engenhão); Attendance: 14.711 (only payers); Referee: Marcos André Gomes da Penha

11 May Second leg	Ceará	2–2 (4–3 agg.)	(Rio de Janeiro (state)) Flamengo	Fortaleza
21:50 (UTC−03:00)	Washington 36' 42'; Diego Macedo (yellow card) 48'; Michel (yellow card) 62'	Report	Thiago Neves 19' 28'; Ronaldo Angelim (yellow card) 24' (yellow-red card) 38'; Welinton (yellow card) 34'; Felipe (yellow card) 42'; Egídio (yellow card) 56'; Willians (yellow card) 58'	Stadium: Estádio Presidente Vargas; Attendance: 15.000; Referee: Sandro Meira Ricci

== Standings ==
Pos	Team	Pld	W	D	L	GF	GA	GD	Pts	Qualification or relegation
2	Vasco da Gama	38	19	12	7	57	40	+17	69	2012 Copa Libertadores Second Stage (Note: Vasco da Gama is qualified for the second stage of the 2012 Copa Libertadores as the 2011 Copa do Brasil champion.)
3	Fluminense	38	20	3	15	60	51	+9	63	2012 Copa Libertadores Second Stage
4	Flamengo	38	15	16	7	59	47	+12	61	2012 Copa Libertadores First Stage
5	Internacional	38	16	12	10	57	43	+14	60	2012 Copa Libertadores First Stage
6	São Paulo	38	16	11	11	57	46	+11	59	2012 Copa Sudamericana Second Stage

Rules for classification: 1st points; 2nd wins; 3rd goal difference; 4th goals scored; 5th head-to-head results; 6th least red cards received; 7th least yellow cards received; 8th draw

=== Results summary ===
Overall								Home						Away					
Pld	W	D	L	GF	GA	GD	Pts	W	D	L	GF	GA	GD	W	D	L	GF	GA	GD
38	15	16	7	59	47	+12	61	9	7	3	30	18	+12	6	9	4	29	29	0

Last updated: 2011-12-05.
Source: Série A 2011

Pld=Matches played; W=Matches won; D=Matches drawn; L=Matches lost;

==== Results by round ====
Round	1	2	3	4	5	6	7	8	9	10	11	12	13	14	15	16	17	18	19	20	21	22	23	24	25	26	27	28	29	30	31	32	33	34	35	36	37	38
Ground	H	A	H	A	H	H	A	H	A	A	H	A	H	A	H	A	H	A	H	A	H	A	H	H	A	H	A	A	H	A	H	A	H	A	H	A	H	A
Result	W	D	D	D	D	W	W	W	W	D	D	W	W	W	W	D	L	D	D	L	L	L	L	D	D	W	W	W	D	W	D	L	W	L	D	D	W	D
Position	1	5	9	11	10	7	6	2	2	3	3	3	2	2	2	2	2	2	2	4	5	5	6	6	6	6	6	4	5	4	4	5	5	5	6	6	4	4

Updated to match(es) played on 27 November. Source: Matches
A = Away; H = Home; W = Win; D = Draw; L = Loss

==== Matches ====
21 May 1	Flamengo	4–0	Avaí	Macaé
18:30 (UTC−03:00)	Darío Bottinelli 22'; Ronaldinho 63'; Thiago Neves 69'; Diego Maurício 87'; Willians (yellow card) 35'	Report	Jonathan Estrada (yellow card) 49'	Stadium: Estádio Cláudio Moacyr; Attendance: 5.973 (only payers); Referee: Andre Luiz Castro

29 May 2	Bahia	3–3	Flamengo	Salvador
16:00 (UTC−03:00)	Ronaldinho 30'; Darío Bottinelli 53'; Egídio 72'; Egídio (yellow card) 18'	(Report)	Lulinha 16'; Jóbson 36' 90'; Hélder (yellow card) 6' (yellow-red card) 77'; Marcone (yellow card) 37'; Ávine (yellow card) 49'	Stadium: Estádio de Pituaçu; Attendance: 32.157 (only payers); Referee: Cleber Wellington Abade

5 June 3	Flamengo	1–1	Corinthians	Rio de Janeiro
16:00 (UTC−03:00)	Renato 39'; Willians (yellow card) 50'; Guilherme Negueba (yellow card) 65'	(Report)	Willian 18'; Liédson (yellow card) 28'; Chicão (yellow card) 62'	Stadium: Estádio Olímpico João Havelange (Engenhão); Attendance: 42.000; Referee: Heber Roberto Lopes

12 June 4	Atlético Paranaense	1–1	Flamengo	Curitiba
18:30 (UTC−03:00)	Madson 59'; Joffre Guerrón (yellow card) 37'; Federico Nieto (yellow card) 45'	(Report)	Deivid 80'; Thiago Neves (yellow card) 12'	Stadium: Arena da Baixada; Attendance: 20.022; Referee: Elmo Alves Resende da Cunha

19 June 5	Flamengo	0–0	Botafogo	Rio de Janeiro
16:00 (UTC−03:00)	Darío Bottinelli (yellow card) 9' (yellow-red card) 23'; Willians (yellow card) 55'; Ronaldinho (yellow card) 57'	(Report)	Éverton (yellow card) 22'; Lucas Zen (yellow card) 29'; Bruno Tiago (yellow card) 57'	Stadium: Estádio Olímpico João Havelange (Engenhão); Attendance: 20.429; Referee: Felipe Gomes da Silva

25 June 6	Flamengo	4–1	Atlético Mineiro	Rio de Janeiro
18:30 (UTC−03:00)	Ronaldinho 66'; Thiago Neves (yellow card) 28' (goal) 75'; Deivid 86' 90'	(Report)	Dudu Cearense 52'; Guilherme (yellow card) 19'; Dudu Cearense (yellow card) 25'; Renan Ribeiro (yellow card) 71'	Stadium: Estádio Olímpico João Havelange (Engenhão); Attendance: 16.870; Referee: Wilson Luiz Seneme

29 June 7	América (MG)	2–3	Flamengo	Sete Lagoas
19:20 (UTC−03:00)	Alessandro 37'; Anderson 45'; Amaral (yellow card) 22'; Alessandro (yellow card) 39'; Flávio (yellow card) 41'; Leandro Ferreira (yellow card) 51' (yellow-red card) 72'	(Report)	Ronaldinho 10' 84'; Deivid 55'; Willians (yellow card) 44'; Ronaldinho (yellow card) 64'; Júnior César (yellow card) 82'; Darío Bottinelli (yellow card) 86'	Stadium: Arena do Jacaré; Attendance: 7.475 (only payers); Referee: Wagner Reway

6 July 8	Flamengo	1–0	São Paulo	Rio de Janeiro
21:50 (UTC−03:00)	Darío Bottinelli 71'; Aírton (yellow card) 49'; Ronaldo Angelim (yellow card) 67'	(Report)	Juan (yellow card) 46'; Xandão (yellow card) 55'; Rodrigo Souto (yellow card) 80'	Stadium: Estádio Olímpico João Havelange (Engenhão); Attendance: 18.418; Referee: Márcio Chagas da Silva

10 July 9	Fluminense	0–1	Flamengo	Rio de Janeiro
16:00 (UTC−03:00)	Carlinhos (yellow card) 41'; Diguinho (yellow card) 72'; Márcio Rozário (yellow card) 87'	(Report)	Willians 45'; Airton (yellow card) 56'	Stadium: Estádio Olímpico João Havelange (Engenhão); Attendance: 23.438; Referee: Rodrigo Nunes de Sá

21 July 10	Palmeiras	0–0	Flamengo	São Paulo
21:50 (UTC−03:00)	Luan (yellow card) 38'	(Report)	Ronaldo Angelim (yellow card) 31'; Thiago Neves (yellow card) 71'; Ronaldinho (yellow card) 85'	Stadium: Estádio do Pacaembu; Attendance: 33.575 (only payers); Referee: Leandro Vuaden

23 July 11	Flamengo	1–1	Ceará	Macaé
21:00 (UTC−03:00)	Renato 32'; Welinton (yellow card) 45'	(Report)	Felipe Azevedo 80'	Stadium: Estádio Cláudio Moacyr; Attendance: 6.154; Referee: Célio Amorim

27 July 12	Santos	4–5	Flamengo	Santos
21:50 (UTC−03:00)	Borges 5' 16'; Neymar 26' 51'; Léo (yellow card) 52'; Neymar (yellow card) 90'	(Report)	Ronaldinho 28' 68' 81'; Thiago Neves 32' (yellow card) 64'; Deivid 44'; Welinton (yellow card) 30'; Willians (yellow card) 41'; Renato (yellow card) 74'; Darío Bottinelli (yellow card) 79'	Stadium: Estádio Vila Belmiro; Attendance: 12.968 (only payers); Referee: André Luiz de Freitas Castro

30 July 13	Flamengo	2–0	Grêmio	Rio de Janeiro
18:30 (UTC−03:00)	Thiago Neves 28'; Ronaldinho 74'; Welinton (yellow card) 57'; Willians (yellow card) 80'	(Report)	Saimon (yellow card) 13'; Fábio Rochemback (yellow card) 31'	Stadium: Estádio Olímpico João Havelange (Engenhão); Attendance: 28.793; Referee: Sálvio Spinola Fagundes Filho

3 August 14	Cruzeiro	0–1	Flamengo	Sete Lagoas
21:50 (UTC−03:00)	Fabrício (yellow card) 25'; Everton (yellow card) 30'	(Report)	Deivid 45+1'; Ronaldo Angelim (yellow card) 27'; Airton (yellow card) 42'; Ronaldinho (yellow card) 83'; Renato (yellow card) 86'	Stadium: Arena do Jacaré; Attendance: 14.863; Referee: Paulo César de Oliveira

6 August 15	Flamengo	1–0	Coritiba	Rio de Janeiro
18:30 (UTC−03:00)	Jael 89'; Luiz Philipe Muralha (yellow card) 30'; Ronaldinho (yellow card) 70'	(Report)	Jonas (yellow card) 32'	Stadium: Estádio Olímpico João Havelange (Engenhão); Attendance: 28.930; Referee: Elmo Alves Resende Cunha

14 August 16	Figueirense	2–2	Flamengo	Florianópolis
16:00 (UTC−03:00)	Somália 54'; Édson Silva 70'	(Report)	Deivid 36' 51'; Willians (yellow card) 23'; Airton (yellow card) 71'; Ronaldinho (yellow card) 72'; Renato (yellow card) 78'; Welinton (yellow card) 86'	Stadium: Estádio Orlando Scarpelli; Attendance: 18.499; Referee: Heber Roberto Lopes

18 August 17	Flamengo	1–4	Atlético Goianiense	Rio de Janeiro
21:00 (UTC−03:00)	Jael 82'; Welinton (yellow card) 78'	(Report)	Pituca 13'; Juninho 37'; Anselmo 50'; Diogo Campos 81'; Joílson (yellow card) 72' (yellow-red card) 86'	Stadium: Estádio Olímpico João Havelange (Engenhão); Attendance: 10.278; Referee: Luiz Flávio de Oliveira

21 August 18	Internacional	2–2	Flamengo	Porto Alegre
16:00 (UTC−03:00)	Índio 50'; Leandro Damião 77'; Pablo Guiñazú (yellow card) 32' (yellow-red card) 45+2'; Andrés D'Alessandro (yellow card) 37'; Nei (yellow card) 84'; Andrezinho (yellow card) 88'	(Report)	Ronaldinho 25'; Jael 60'; Alex Silva (yellow card) 41'; Ronaldinho (yellow card) 45+1'; Willians (yellow card) 53'; Luiz Philipe Muralha (yellow card) 58'; Léo Moura (yellow card) 65'; Júnior César (yellow card) 87'	Stadium: Estádio Beira-Rio; Attendance: 26.752; Referee: Francisco Carlos Nascimento

28 August 19	Flamengo	0–0	Vasco da Gama	Rio de Janeiro
16:00 (UTC−03:00)	Willians (yellow card) 23'; Felipe (yellow card) 26'; Welinton (red card); Júnior César (yellow card) 78'	(Report)	Fagner (yellow card) 26'; Jumar (yellow card) 32'; Eduardo Costa (yellow card) 73'	Stadium: Estádio Olímpico João Havelange (Engenhão); Attendance: 33.206; Referee: Pericles Bassols

31 August 20	Avaí	3–2	Flamengo	Florianópolis
21:50 (UTC−03:00)	Robson 3'; Lincoln 69'; Rafael Coelho 72'; Bruno Silva (yellow card) 18'; William (yellow card) 75'; Fabiano (yellow card) 82'	(Report)	Ronaldinho 36' 89'; Gustavo (yellow card) 50'; Rodrigo Alvim (yellow card) 66'	Stadium: Estádio da Ressacada; Attendance: 13.192; Referee: Wilton Pereira Sampaio

4 September 21	Flamengo	1–3	Bahia	Rio de Janeiro
16:00 UTC−03:00	Renato 29' (yellow card) 74'; Ronaldo Angelim (yellow card) 79'; Gustavo (yellow card) 90+2'	(Report)	Titi 22'; Dodô 33'; Souza 45'; Carlos Alberto (yellow card) 20'; Fabinho (yellow card) 26'; Ricardinho (yellow card) 28'; Reinaldo (yellow card) 55'; Tiago (yellow card) 70'	Stadium: Estádio Olímpico João Havelange (Engenhão); Attendance: 9.755 (only payers); Referee: Alício Pena Junior

8 September 22	Corinthians	2–1	Flamengo	São Paulo
21:50 UTC−03:00	Liédson 62' 88'; Alex (yellow card) 75'; Liédson (yellow card) 84'; Emerson (yellow card) 89'	(Report)	Deivid 28'; Claudio Maldonado (yellow card) 31'; Thiago Neves (yellow card) 33'; Ronaldinho (yellow card) 64'; Darío Bottinelli (yellow card)	Stadium: Estádio do Pacaembu; Attendance: 35.392; Referee: Márcio Chagas da Silva

11 September 23	Flamengo	1–2	Atlético Paranaense	Macaé
18:00 UTC−03:00	Welinton 82'; Léo Moura (yellow card) 41'	(Report)	Heracles 39'; Joffre Guerrón 46'; Joffre Guerrón (yellow card) 50' (yellow-red card) 69'	Stadium: Estádio Cláudio Moacyr; Attendance: 5.924 (only payers); Referee: Ricardo Marques Ribeiro

18 September 24	Botafogo	1–1	Flamengo	Rio de Janeiro
16:00 UTC−03:00	Sebastian Abreu 25'; Renato (yellow card) 60'	(Report)	Jael 49'; Alex Silva (yellow card) 4'; Airton (yellow card) 30'; Renato (yellow card) 40'	Stadium: Estádio Olímpico João Havelange (Engenhão); Attendance: 20.805 (only payers); Referee: Pericles Bassols

21 September 25	Atlético Mineiro	1–1	Flamengo	Sete Lagoas
21:50 UTC−03:00	Daniel Carvalho 49'; (yellow card) 57'; Pierre (yellow card) 70'; Serginho (yellow card) 74' (yellow-red card) 88'	(Report)	Ronaldinho 61'; Alex Silva (yellow card) 47'; Ronaldinho (yellow card) 67'	Stadium: Arena do Jacaré; Referee: Paulo César Oliveira

24 September 26	Flamengo	2–1	América (MG)	Rio de Janeiro
18:00 UTC−03:00	Deivid; Thiago Neves; Léo Moura (yellow card) 43'	(Report)	Kempes (pen.); Otávio (yellow card) 51'	Stadium: Estádio Olímpico João Havelange (Engenhão); Attendance: Guilherme Cereta Lima; Referee: 9.445

2 October 27	São Paulo	1–2	Flamengo	São Paulo
16:00 UTC−03:00	Dagoberto 78'; Lucas (yellow card) 36' (yellow-red card) 54'; Wellington (yellow card) 42'; Dagoberto (yellow card) 79'; Denílson (yellow card) 85'	(Report)	Thiago Neves 64'; Renato 84'; Airton (yellow card) 28'; Willians (yellow card) 57' (yellow-red card) 69'	Stadium: Estádio do Morumbi; Attendance: 63.871; Referee: Fabrício Neves Correa

9 October 28	Flamengo	3–2	Fluminense	Rio de Janeiro
16:00 UTC−03:00	Thiago Neves 68'; Darío Bottinelli 86' 89'; Claudio Maldonado (yellow card) 49'; Jael (yellow card) 84'	(Report)	Rafael Sóbis 59'; Diguinho (yellow card) 18'; Manuel Lanzini (yellow card) 78'; Leandro Euzebio (yellow card) 84'; Souza (red card) 90+3'	Stadium: Estádio Olímpico João Havelange (Engenhão); Attendance: 21.052 (only payers); Referee: Felipe Gomes da Silva

12 October 29	Flamengo	1–1	Palmeiras	Rio de Janeiro
21:50 UTC−03:00	Thiago Neves 55'; Willians (yellow card) 34'; Alex Silva (yellow card) 77'; Guilherme Negueba (yellow card) 84'	(Report)	Maikon Leite 63'; Marcos Assunção (yellow card) 32'; Patrik (yellow card) 36'; Cicinho (yellow card) 40'; Thiago Heleno (yellow card) 60'	Stadium: Estádio Olímpico João Havelange (Engenhão); Attendance: 22.572; Referee: Emerson Ferreira de Almeida

15 October 30	Ceará	0–1	Flamengo	Fortaleza
18:00 UTC−03:00	Heleno (red card); Leandro Chaves (yellow card) 60'; Osvaldo (yellow card) 90+3' (yellow-red card) 90+3'	(Report)	Deivid 40'; Alex Silva (yellow card) 46'; Ronaldinho (red card); Júnior César (yellow card) 55'; Thiago Neves (yellow card) 76'	Stadium: Estádio Presidente Vargas; Attendance: 19.061; Referee: André Luis Castro

23 October 31	Flamengo	1–1	Santos	Rio de Janeiro
18:00 UTC−03:00	Deivid 77'; Guilherme Negueba (yellow card) 11'; Willians (yellow card) 51'; Claudio Maldonado (yellow card) 82'	(Report)	Neymar 48' (pen.)	Stadium: Estádio Olímpico João Havelange (Engenhão); Attendance: 13.853 (only payers); Referee: Paulo Henrique Godoy Bezerra

30 October 32	Grêmio	4–2	Flamengo	Porto Alegre
16:00 UTC−03:00	André Lima 41' 50'; Douglas 79'; Ezequiel Miralles 84'; Saimon (yellow card) 16'; Douglas (yellow card) 44'; Adílson (yellow card) 49'; Fernando (yellow card) 58'; Bruno Collaço (yellow card) 82'		Deivid 23'; Thiago Neves 34'; Júnior César (yellow card) 14'; Ronaldinho (yellow card) 80'; Renato (yellow card) 90'	Stadium: Estádio Olímpico; Attendance: 39.647; Referee: Evandro Rogério Román

6 November 33	Flamengo	5–1	Cruzeiro	Rio de Janeiro
17:00 UTC−03:00	Deivid 36' 48'; Thiago Neves 54' 58' 70'; Alex Silva (yellow card) 30'	(Report)	Anselmo Ramon 23'; Charles (yellow card) 44'; Emílson Cribari (yellow card) 56'; Anselmo Ramon (red card)	Stadium: Estádio Olímpico João Havelange (Engenhão); Attendance: 34.496 (only payers); Referee: Leandro Pedro Vuaden

13 November 34	Coritiba	2–0	Flamengo	Curitiba
17:00 UTC−03:00	Leonardo 29'; Maranhão 35'; Éverton Costa (yellow card) 74'; Leandro Donizete (yellow card) 87'; Lucas Mendes (yellow card) 90+2'		Ronaldo Angelim (yellow card) 17'; Renato (yellow card) 41'; Felipe (yellow card) 58'	Stadium: Estádio Couto Pereira; Attendance: N/A; Referee: Jaílson Macedo Freitas

16 November 35	Flamengo	0–0	Figueirense	Rio de Janeiro
21:45 UTC−03:00	Paulo Victor (yellow card) 60'; David Braz (yellow card) 75'		Ygor (yellow card) 82'	Stadium: Estádio Olímpico João Havelange (Engenhão); Attendance: 24.385; Referee: Evandro Rogério Román

20 November 36	Atlético Goianiense	0–0	Flamengo	Goiânia
17:00 UTC−03:00	Bida (yellow card) 28'; Pituca (yellow card) 64'		Júnior César (yellow card) 86'; Luiz Philipe Muralha (yellow card) 90'	Stadium: Estádio Serra Dourada; Attendance: N/A; Referee: Paulo César de Oliveira

27 November 37	Flamengo	1–0	Internacional	Macaé
17:00 UTC−03:00	Ronaldinho 45+1'; Gonzalo Fierro (yellow card) 8'; Thomas (yellow card) 35'; Ronaldinho (yellow card) 39'; Alex Silva (yellow card) 74'	(Report)	Rodrigo Moledo (yellow card) 2'; Kléber (yellow card) 80'	Stadium: Estádio Cláudio Moacyr; Attendance: 12.911; Referee: Marcelo de Lima Henrique

4 December 38	Vasco da Gama	1–1	Flamengo	Rio de Janeiro
17:00 UTC−03:00	Diego Souza 30'; Jumar (yellow card) 19' (yellow-red card) 70'; Eduardo Costa (yellow card) 87'; Fernando Prass (yellow card) 90+3'		Renato 55'; Alex Silva (yellow card) 32'; Guilherme Negueba (yellow card) 36'; Renato (yellow card) 82' (yellow-red card) 90'	Stadium: Estádio Olímpico João Havelange (Engenhão); Attendance: N/A; Referee: Pericles Bassols Pegado Cortez

== Copa Sudamericana ==
=== Second stage ===
10 August First leg	Flamengo (Brazil)	1–0	Atlético Paranaense	Rio de Janeiro
21:50 (UTC−03:00)	Ronaldinho 82'(pen.); David Braz (yellow card) 54'	Report	Wendel Santos (yellow card) 11'; Santos (yellow card) 81'	Stadium: Estádio Olímpico João Havelange (Engenhão); Attendance: 4.266; Referee: Ricardo Marques

24 August Second leg	Atlético Paranaense (Brazil)	0–1 (0–2 agg.)	Flamengo	Curitiba
21:50 (UTC−03:00)		Report	Ronaldinho 73'	Stadium: Arena da Baixada; Attendance: 12.224 (only payers); Referee: Sálvio Spínola Fagundes Filho

=== Round of 16 ===
19 October First leg	Flamengo (Brazil)	0–4	Universidad de Chile	Rio de Janeiro
21:50 (UTC−03:00)	Welinton (yellow card) 19'; Airton (red card); David Braz (yellow card) 61'; Renato (yellow card) 67'	[ Report]	José Manuel Rojas 13'; Eduardo Vargas 42' 42'; Gustavo Lorenzetti 71'; Marcelo Díaz (yellow card) 20'; Francisco Castro (red card); Marcos González (yellow card) 82'; Matías Rodríguez (yellow card) 90+1'	Stadium: Estádio Olímpico João Havelange (Engenhão); Attendance: 3.970 (only payers); Referee: Saul Laverni

26 October Second leg	Universidad de Chile	1–0 (5–0 agg.)	Flamengo	Santiago
21:50 (UTC−03:00)	Marcelo Díaz 22'; Matías Rodríguez (yellow card) 42'; Marcos González (yellow card) 55'; Gustavo Canales (yellow card) 64'	Report	Vander (yellow card) 29'; Willians (yellow card) 37'; Ronaldo Angelim (yellow card) 53'; Gustavo (yellow card) 63'	Stadium: Estadio Nacional; Referee: Carlos Amarilla

== Honors ==
=== Individuals ===
Name	Number	Country	Award
Felipe	1	(Brazil)	2011 Campeonato Carioca Best Goalkeeper
Leonardo Moura	2	(Brazil)	2011 Campeonato Carioca Best Right Back
Willians	8	(Brazil)	2011 Campeonato Carioca Best Defensive Midfielder
Thiago Neves	7	(Brazil)	2011 Campeonato Carioca Best Attacking Midfielder; 2011 Campeonato Carioca Best Player; 2011 Campeonato Carioca Best Player (People's choice)
Ronaldinho	10	(Brazil)	2011 Campeonato Carioca Best Second Striker; 2011 Bola de Prata Best Second Stricker; 2011 Série A Team of the Year
Renato	11	(Brazil)	2011 Campeonato Carioca Best Defensive Central Midfielder
Vanderlei Luxemburgo		(Brazil)	2011 Campeonato Carioca Best Manager

== IFFHS ranking ==
Flamengo position on the Club World Ranking during the 2011 season, according to IFFHS.

Month	Position	Points
January	62	147,0
February	81	133,0
March	99	119,0
April	150	96,0
May	246	78,0
June	197	88,0
July	153	98,0
August	81	128,0
September	97	120,0
October	105	120,0
November	91	126,0
December	93	126,0

Last updated: 2011-04-03.
Source: IFFHS
