= João Vitor (footballer, born 1991) =

Brazilian footballer

Personal information
- Full name: João Vitor Ribeiro Rodrigues
- Date of birth: December 1, 1991 (age 34)
- Place of birth: Caratinga, Brazil
- Height: 1.78 m (5 ft 10 in)
- Position: Centre midfielder

Team information
- Current team: Tupi

Youth career
- 2007: Artsul
- 2008–2011: Flamengo

Senior career*
Years	Team	Apps	(Gls)
2011–2012	Flamengo	1	(0)
2012	→ Londrina (loan)	0	(0)
2012–2013	Braga B	2	(0)
2014	Artsul		
2015	Barcelona-RJ		
2016	Olaria		
2017–2019	Goytacaz		
2018	→ Palmas (loan)		
2019–	Tupi	1	(0)

International career
2009	Brazil U-18		
- * Club domestic league appearances and goals as of 30 September 2017

João Vitor Ribeiro Rodrigues, better known as João Vitor (born December 1, 1991, in Caratinga), is a Brazilian centre midfielder who plays for Tupi.

== Career ==
=== Beginning in Minas ===
João is a native of Caratinga, belonging to the eastern city of Minas Gerais, with a population over 80,000 inhabitants, counting the nearby districts. From humble family, he started at school for Maguila, nicknamed Cláudio, famous in the region where he began making his first kicks. Maguila promised the young man that if he stood out, take him to try his luck in Rio de Janeiro.

The promise was fulfilled after João Vitor show stand out among other kids. The grit and determination allied technique to the centre midfielder won him a test in Artsul, time to contest the second division of professional soccer in Rio de Janeiro. A smaller club, but with good structure. From there came the boys Jorbison, today at Flamengo, and Geovane Maranhão, hired by Vasco da Gama.

=== Featured on the basis carioca ===
The team of Nova Iguaçu, João Victor stood out in Campeonato Carioca Juvenil de 2007, when the team went to the seventh stage, before the last final, and lost the group standings for the Vasco da Gama. At the time, the coach of Flamengo, Rogério Lourenço, who later would win the final in Vasco, invited the youth to go to the team, the Estádio da Gávea. For João, a former supporter of Palmeiras and without the family who lived in housing Artsul, going to a big team was undoubtedly a great achievement.

In 2009, Rogério Lourenço, responsible for his going to Flamengo Categories of Base, then also led to the selection. With the yellow jersey, he played an under-18 tournament in Spain. It was the ninth Copa do Mediterrâneo in that the selection was the vice-championship.

João Vitor who is an admirer of the World Cup winner Gilberto Silva. Today, he is absolute owner in the team led by Armênio Moura, in the Flamengo's youth team, but want to get the core team. This transition has come to be taken for granted at the end of last year, and despite major contributions from João during the Copa São Paulo de Juniores, has not yet materialized.

The centre midfielder João Vitor has the main characteristics of quality in the pass game and good vision.

Started to train in the first team of Flamengo in 2010.

=== Career statistics ===
(Correct as of February 1, 2012)

Club	Season	State League		Brazilian Série A		Copa do Brasil		Copa Libertadores		Copa Sudamericana		Total	
Club	Season	Apps	Goals	Apps	Goals	Apps	Goals	Apps	Goals	Apps	Goals	Apps	Goals
Flamengo	2011	1	0	1	0	-	-	-	-	-	-	2	0
Flamengo	2012	2	0	0	0	-	-	-	-	-	-	2	0
Total		3	0	1	0	-	-	-	-	-	-	4	0

according to combined sources on the Flamengo official website and Flaestatística.

== Honours ==
Flamengo

- Campeonato Carioca: 2011

Goytacaz

- Campeonato Carioca Série B1: 2017
