= Rafael Galhardo =

Brazilian footballer (born 1991)

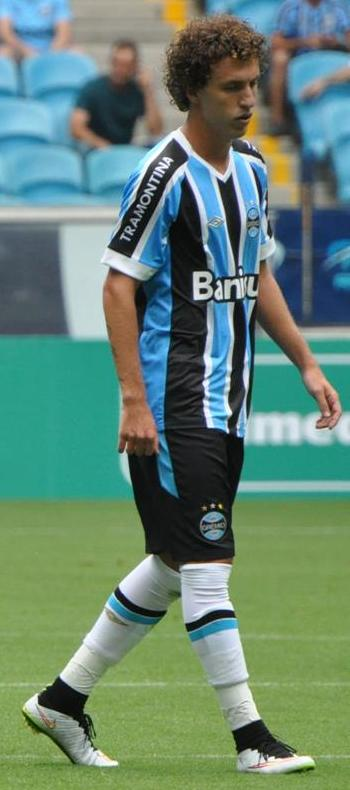
- Galhardo playing for Grêmio in 2015

Personal information
- Full name: Rafael Galhardo de Souza
- Date of birth: 30 October 1991 (age 35)
- Place of birth: Nova Friburgo, Brazil
- Height: 1.76 m (5 ft 9 1/2 in)
- Position: Right back

Team information
- Current team: Rayong
- Number: 42

Youth career
- 2007: Friburguense
- 2008–2010: Flamengo

Senior career*
Years	Team	Apps	(Gls)
2009–2012	Flamengo	32	(1)
2012–2015	Santos	28	(2)
2014	→ Bahia (loan)	7	(2)
2015	→ Grêmio (loan)	49	(2)
2016–2017	Anderlecht	1	(0)
2016	→ Atlético Paranaense (loan)	7	(0)
2017	Cruzeiro	2	(0)
2018–2020	Vasco da Gama	22	(0)
2019	→ Grêmio (loan)	20	(2)
2021–2022	Valour FC	22	(2)
2022–2023	Rayong	16	(8)
2023	Sukhothai	6	(0)
2024–	Rayong	10	(4)

International career
2011	Brazil U20	9	(0)
- * Club domestic league appearances and goals as of 10 March 2024

Rafael Galhardo de Souza (born 30 October 1991), known as Rafael Galhardo or simply Galhardo, is a Brazilian professional footballer who plays as a right back for Rayong in the Thai League 2.

== Club career ==
=== Flamengo ===
Born in Nova Friburgo, Rio de Janeiro, Galhardo was a Flamengo youth graduate. He made his first team – and Série A – debut on 20 August 2009, coming on as a second-half substitute for Jorbison in a 1–2 home loss against Cruzeiro.

Galhardo was definitely promoted to the main 2010, spending the following years mainly as a backup to Léo Moura. He scored his first senior goal on 27 April 2011, netting the first in a 3–0 away win against Horizonte, for the year's Copa do Brasil.

=== Santos ===
On 18 May 2012 Galhardo moved to Santos, along with Flamengo teammate David Braz, in an exchange for Ibson. He was mainly a second-choice to Bruno Peres during his first year.

==== Bahia (loan) ====
On 20 December 2013, after being demoted to third-choice after the arrival of Cicinho, Galhardo was loaned to fellow league team Bahia for a year. Rarely used during the first half of the campaign, he was only utilized in the last five league matches as a defensive midfielder.

==== Grêmio (loan) ====
On 10 January 2015 Galhardo moved to Grêmio in a season-long loan deal. He quickly established himself as an undisputed starter by appearing in 33 matches and scoring two goals, one of them against his former club Santos, and was also named the tournament's best right back by magazine Placar.

=== Anderlecht ===
On 7 January 2016 Belgian Pro League club Anderlecht signed Galhardo from Santos paying a €1 million transfer fee. In his period in Belgium he only played one match, against Sint-Truiden on 29 January 2016.

=== Cruzeiro ===
On 2017 Galhardo signed contract with Cruzeiro after recovering from a knee surgery. In six months at Cruzeiro he only managed to play in two matches and the club released him at the end of the season.

=== Vasco da Gama ===
On 14 January 2018 Vasco da Gama officially signed Galhardo.

==== Grêmio (second stint) ====
On 3 March 2019 Grêmio signed Galhardo on loan from Vasco da Gama until the end of 2019 season.

=== Valour FC ===
On 3 June 2021, Galhardo signed with Canadian Premier League side Valour FC.

== Career statistics ==
As of 27 November 2019.

Club	Season	League			Cup		Continental		Other		Total	
Club	Season	Division	Apps	Goals	Apps	Goals	Apps	Goals	Apps	Goals	Apps	Goals
Flamengo	2009	Série A	3	0	–		–		–		3	0
Flamengo	2010	Série A	5	0	–		–		2 (Note: Appearance(s) in Campeonato Carioca.)	0	7	0
Flamengo	2011	Série A	5	0	2	1	3 (Note: Appearance(s) in Copa Sudamericana.)	0	4	0	14	1
Flamengo	2012	Série A	0	0	–		1 (Note: Appearance(s) in Copa Libertadores.)	0	6	0	7	0
Flamengo	Total		13	0	2	1	4	0	10	0	31	1
Santos	2012	Série A	5	0	–		–		–		5	0
Santos	2013	Série A	12	0	6	1	–		3 (Note: Appearance(s) in Campeonato Paulista.)	0	21	1
Santos	Total		17	0	6	1	0	0	3	0	26	1
Bahia (loan)	2014	Série A	5	1	0	0	–		2 (Note: One Appearance in Campeonato Baiano, one appearance in Copa do Nordeste.)	0	7	1
Grêmio (loan)	2015	Série A	33	2	6	0	–		10 (Note: Appearance(s) in Campeonato Gaúcho.)	0	49	2
Anderlecht	2015–16	Pro League	1	0	–		–		–		1	0
Atlético Paranaense (loan)	2016	Série A	6	0	1	0	–		–		7	0
Cruzeiro	2017	Série A	2	0	–		–		–		2	0
Vasco da Gama	2018	Série A	11	0	1	0	2	0	8	0	22	0
Grêmio (loan)	2019	Série A	15	2	1	0	1	0	2	0	19	2
Career total			103	5	17	2	7	0	35	0	162	7

== Honours ==
=== Club ===
Flamengo

- Campeonato Brasileiro Série A: 2009
- Campeonato Carioca: 2011

Bahia

- Campeonato Baiano: 2014

Grêmio

- Copa do Brasil: 2016
- Campeonato Gaúcho: 2019

=== International ===
- South American Youth Championship: 2011
- FIFA U-20 World Cup: 2011

=== Individual ===
- Bola de Prata: 2015
- Campeonato Brasileiro Série A Team of the Year: 2015

== Personal life ==
Galhardo's older brother, Marquinhos was also a footballer. A midfielder, he represented Friburguense before dying from a car accident in April 2013.
