= Alexandre Melo =

Brazilian footballer (born 1999)

Personal information
- Full name: Alexandre Melo Ribeiro da Silva
- Date of birth: 11 February 1999 (age 27)
- Place of birth: Rio de Janeiro, Brazil
- Height: 1.80 m (5 ft 11 in)
- Position: Left back

Team information
- Current team: Metropolitano

Youth career
- –2013: Botafogo
- 2014: Artsul
- 2014–2019: Vasco da Gama

Senior career*
Years	Team	Apps	(Gls)
2019–2020	Vasco da Gama	5	(0)
2020–2023	Cuiabá	2	(0)
2021	→ CRB (loan)	6	(0)
2023	→ Joinville (loan)	4	(0)
2023–	Metropolitano	0	(0)
- * Club domestic league appearances and goals as of 11 March 2023

Alexandre Melo Ribeiro da Silva (born 11 February 1999), known as Alexandre Melo or simply Alexandre, is a Brazilian footballer who plays as a left back for Metropolitano.

== Career statistics ==
=== Club ===
As of 29 October 2021.

Club	Season	League			State league		Cup		Continental		Other		Total	
Club	Season	Division	Apps	Goals	Apps	Goals	Apps	Goals	Apps	Goals	Apps	Goals	Apps	Goals
Vasco da Gama	2019	Série A	1	0	0	0	0	0	—		—		1	0
Vasco da Gama	2020	Série A	0	0	4	0	0	0	1 (Note: Appearance(s) in Copa Sudamericana)	0	—		5	0
Vasco da Gama	Total		1	0	4	0	0	0	1	0	—		6	0
Cuiabá	2020	Série B	2	0	—		—		—		3 (Note: Appearance(s) in Copa Verde)	0	5	0
Cuiabá	2021	Série A	0	0	8	0	1	0	—		0	0	9	0
Cuiabá	Total		2	0	8	0	1	0	—		3	0	14	0
CRB (loan)	2021	Série B	6	0	—		—		—		1 (Note: Appearance(s) in Copa do Nordeste)	0	7	0
Career total			9	0	12	0	1	0	1	0	4	0	27	0
