= Lorran =

Lorran may refer to:

- Lorran (footballer, born 1993) (Michel Lorran Rodrigues Mota), Brazilian football midfielder
- Lorran (footballer, born 1995) (Lorran David Ferreira Costa), Brazilian football forward
- Breno Lorran (born 1995), Brazilian football left-back
- Lorran (footballer, born 1996) (Lorran de Oliveira Quintanilha), Brazilian football left-back
- Lorran (footballer, born 2006) (Lorran Lucas Pereira de Sousa), Brazilian football midfielder
