= Jairinho =

Brazilian footballer

Personal information
- Full name: Jairo Santos de Oliveira Filho
- Date of birth: 9 August 1990 (age 36)
- Place of birth: Rio de Janeiro, Brazil
- Height: 1.70 m (5 ft 7 in)
- Position: Forward

Team information
- Current team: Treze

Senior career*
Years	Team	Apps	(Gls)
2017	Campo Grande	7	(6)
2018–2019	Bangu	14	(0)
2019	→ Vasco da Gama (loan)	4	(0)
2019	→ Atlético Goianiense (loan)	9	(0)
2020	Bangu	7	(0)
2020	Artsul	3	(0)
2020	ABC	3	(1)
2021–	Treze	0	(0)
- * Club domestic league appearances and goals as of 10:19, 2 March 2021 (UTC)

Jairo Santos de Oliveira Filho, commonly known as Jairinho or Jairo, is a Brazilian footballer who plays as a forward for Treze. He played at the top level of Brazilian football for Vasco da Gama in 2019.

== Career ==
Born in Rio de Janeiro, Jairinho first appeared in senior football at the age of 26, playing for Campo Grande in the fourth level of the Campeonato Carioca, the Rio de Janeiro state championship. He scored 6 goals in the 7 games he played with the club. Later in 2018, he was spotted by Bangu whilst playing in a training game, and signed for the club for the start of the 2018 season. In 2019 he helped the club finish third in the Campeonato Carioca, qualifying them for national competition.

The 2019 Campeonato Carioca campaign ended for Bangu with semi-final defeat against Vasco da Gama, and a few days later Jairinho joined the Série A club. He made his top-flight debut for Vasco on 4 May 2019, as a substitute in a 1–1 draw against Corinthians, a game which took place in Arena da Amazônia.

After making four substitute appearances in the first three months of the season, Jairinho was loaned to Atlético-GO in Série B for the remainder of the 2019 season. Here he made his debut from the bench again, on 13 August 2019, in the 2–0 victory against Oeste.

At the end of 2019, Jairinho returned to Bangu to play with the club in the 2020 Campeonato Carioca and 2020 Copa do Brasil. He was released when the COVID-19 pandemic forced suspension of competition, and was a free agent until signing for Carioca third division side Artsul in October 2020. After only three games with the club, he agreed termination of his contract and signed for ABC who were active in the later stages of the 2020 Campeonato Brasileiro Série D. On 27 November 2020, in the final group game of the competition against Itabaiana, he scored his first national competition goal.

ABC ended their campaign at the first knockout stage in December, leaving Jairinho free to sign for Treze in January 2021.
