= Airton (footballer, born February 1990) =

Brazilian footballer

Personal information
- Full name: Airton Ribeiro Santos
- Date of birth: 21 February 1990 (age 36)
- Place of birth: Rio de Janeiro, Brazil
- Height: 1.81 m (5 ft 11 in)
- Position: Defensive midfielder

Team information
- Current team: Al-Kahrabaa
- Number: 14

Youth career
- 2003–2008: Nova Iguaçu
- 2007: → Mesquita (loan)
- 2008: → Flamengo (loan)

Senior career*
Years	Team	Apps	(Gls)
2007–2008	Nova Iguaçu	0	(0)
2007	→ Mesquita (loan)	0	(0)
2008	→ Flamengo (loan)	16	(0)
2009	Flamengo	30	(0)
2010–2015	Benfica	19	(0)
2011–2012	→ Flamengo (loan)	31	(1)
2013	→ Internacional (loan)	13	(0)
2014–2015	→ Botafogo (loan)	25	(0)
2015–2017	Botafogo	24	(0)
2018–2019	Fluminense	19	(0)
2020	Ermis Aradippou	2	(0)
2020–2021	Erbil SC		
2021–	Al-Kahrabaa		
- * Club domestic league appearances and goals

Airton Ribeiro Santos (born 21 February 1990), simply known as Airton, is a Brazilian professional footballer who plays as a defensive midfielder for Al-Kahrabaa FC.

== Career ==
=== Early career ===
Airton started his career at Nova Iguaçu at the age of 13. At the end of 2007, Flamengo's youth coach Adílio asked for his loan. Airton also spent four months on loan at Mesquita in 2007, playing on the youth team.

=== Flamengo ===
Airton arrived at Flamengo, on loan, on 7 January 2008 to play for the club's youth team. His rights belonged to, at the time, Nova Iguaçu, which had him under contract until 2010. He would play for Flamengo until the end of 2008, but in 2008, Flamengo officially signed him, acquiring part of his rights — Nova Iguaçu and Traffic, an investors group, shared the other parts of his rights.

His first match in the first-team was in a 1–1 draw against Vasco da Gama on 6 April 2008, and his debut in the Brazilian Série A was at Mineirão Stadium, coming off the bench in a 1–1 draw against Atlético Mineiro on 9 July.

=== Benfica ===
In December 2009, after much speculation, Benfica signed Airton to a five-year contract. Flamengo received a sum around €1.1 million for 15% of his rights. In Portugal, he acted mainly as a back-up for starter Javi García for the second part of the 2009-10 season. After struggling to perform on the same level in the following season, Airton was loaned to Flamengo.

=== Return to Brazil ===
Airton returned to Flamengo from Benfica almost a year and a half after his original loan deal to Flamengo ended, penning a season-long loan deal on 10 June 2011. In May 2012, it was extended until June 2013, but was eventually cut short as he moved teams. In February 2013, Internacional, signed Airton on loan until December 2013, for a reported €300,000 fee.

In January 2014, Airton moved to Botafogo until June 2014, with the loan deal being later extended until 30 June 2015, effectively meaning Airton will not return to Benfica. On 10 September 2014, Airton was sent off in a match against São Paulo after deliberately stepping on Alexandre Pato's head, and was suspended for two matches. He also faced a two-year suspension for refusing to take an anti-doping test, which he was later acquitted of.

On 10 September 2015, after his contract with Benfica ended, Airton signed a one-season deal with Botafogo.

== Career statistics ==
As of 24 December 2014

Appearances and goals by club, season and competition
Club	Season	League		Cup		Regional League		Continental		Other (Note: Includes Supertaça and Taça da Liga.)		Total	
Club	Season	Apps	Goals	Apps	Goals	Apps	Goals	Apps	Goals	Apps	Goals	Apps	Goals
Flamengo	2008	16	0	—		1	0	0	0	—		17	0
Flamengo	2009	30	0	6	0	14	0	2	0	—		52	0
Flamengo	Total	46	0	6	0	15	0	2	0	—		69	0
Benfica	2009–10	4	0	—		—		1	0	1	0	6	0
Benfica	2010–11	15	0	4	0	—		4	0	4	0	27	0
Benfica	Total	19	0	4	0	—		5	0	5	0	33	0
Flamengo (loan)	2011	18	0	—		—		2	0	—		20	0
Flamengo (loan)	2012	13	1	—		3	0	2	0	—		18	1
Flamengo (loan)	Total	31	1	—		3	0	4	0	—		38	1
Internacional (loan)	2013	13	0	5	0	9	1	—		—		27	1
Botafogo (loan)	2014	24	0	—		8	0	1	0	—		33	0
Career total		133	1	15	0	35	1	12	0	5	0	200	2

== Honours ==
Flamengo

- Campeonato Carioca: 2008, 2009
- Brazilian Série A: 2009

Benfica

- Primeira Liga: 2009–10
- Taça da Liga: 2009–10, 2010–11
- Supertaça Cândido de Oliveira runner-up: 2010

Internacional

- Campeonato Gaúcho: 2013

Individual

- Campeonato Carioca Team of the year: 2018
