= Jael (footballer) =

Brazilian footballer

Personal information
- Full name: Jael Ferreira Vieira
- Date of birth: 30 October 1988 (age 38)
- Place of birth: Várzea Grande, Brazil
- Height: 1.86 m (6 ft 1 in)
- Position: Striker

Team information
- Current team: Água Santa
- Number: 22

Youth career
- 2005: Cuiabá
- 2006–2007: Fluminense

Senior career*
Years	Team	Apps	(Gls)
2007–2008	Criciúma	36	(10)
2008	Atlético Mineiro	13	(2)
2009	Cruzeiro	0	(0)
2009	Goiás	7	(0)
2009	Bahia	20	(10)
2010–2011	Kalmar FF	2	(0)
2010–2011	→ Bahia (loan)	27	(14)
2011	Portuguesa	15	(7)
2011–2012	Flamengo	18	(6)
2012	Sport Recife	17	(4)
2012	Seongnam Ilhwa Chunma	15	(2)
2013–2015	São Caetano	35	(14)
2014–2015	→ Joinville (loan)	37	(17)
2015–2016	Chongqing Lifan	19	(3)
2016	Joinville	20	(7)
2017–2018	Grêmio	48	(11)
2019–2020	FC Tokyo	15	(1)
2019	FC Tokyo U-23	6	(3)
2020	→ Matsumoto Yamaga (loan)	14	(1)
2021–2022	Ceará	23	(2)
2023	Náutico	12	(3)
2023	Avaí	6	(0)
2024–	Água Santa	3	(0)
- * Club domestic league appearances and goals as of 15 October 2023

Jael Ferreira Vieira (born 30 October 1988), simply known as Jael, is a Brazilian footballer who plays as a striker for Água Santa.

== Career ==
Jael was born in Várzea Grande, Mato Grosso. Having previously played for Criciúma, Atlético Mineiro, Goiás and Bahia, he signed for Swedish Allsvenska club Kalmar FF on 25 January 2010. Jael's contract with Kalmar FF was terminated on 12 May 2010 following problems for Jael to adapt to Sweden, the club and the other players.

== Career statistics ==
As of 25 October 2021.

Club	Season	League			State League		Cup		Continental		Other		Total	
Club	Season	Division	Apps	Goals	Apps	Goals	Apps	Goals	Apps	Goals	Apps	Goals	Apps	Goals
Criciúma	2007	Série B	2	0	—		—		—		—		2	0
Criciúma	2008	Série B	11	2	23	8	5	2	—		—		39	12
Criciúma	Total		13	2	23	8	5	2	—		—		41	12
Atlético Mineiro	2008	Série A	13	2	—		—		2 (Note: Appearance(s) in Copa Sudamericana)	0	—		15	2
Cruzeiro	2009	Série A	0	0	0	0	—		0	0	—		0	0
Goiás	2009	Série A	3	0	4	0	2	1	—		—		9	1
Bahia	2009	Série B	20	10	—		—		—		—		20	10
Kalmar FF	2010	Allsvenskan	2	0	—		—		—		—		2	0
Bahia	2010	Série B	24	12	—		—		—		2 (Note: Appearance(s) in Copa do Nordeste)	1	26	13
Bahia	2011	Série A	0	0	3	2	0	0	—		—		3	2
Bahia	Total		24	12	3	2	0	0	—		2	1	29	15
Portuguesa	2011	Série B	3	1	12	6	2	0	—		—		17	7
Flamengo	2011	Série A	16	4	—		—		4	0	—		20	4
Flamengo	2012	Série A	0	0	2	2	—		0	0	—		2	2
Flamengo	Total		16	4	2	2	—		4	0	—		22	6
Sport Recife	2012	Série A	1	0	16	4	2	1	—		—		19	5
Seongnam Ilhwa Chunma	2012	K-League	15	2	—		0	0	0	0	—		15	2
São Caetano	2013	Série B	26	11	7	3	2	0	—		—		35	14
São Caetano	2014	Série B	0	0	2	0	0	0	—		—		2	0
São Caetano	Total		26	11	9	3	2	0	—		—		37	14
Joinville	2014	Série B	23	12	9	5	2	2	—		—		34	19
Joinville	2015	Série A	3	0	2	0	1	0	—		—		6	0
Joinville	Total		26	12	11	5	3	2	—		—		40	19
Chongqing Lifan	2015	Chinese Super League	10	1	—		—		—		—		10	1
Chongqing Lifan	2016	Chinese Super League	9	2	—		—		—		—		9	2
Chongqing Lifan	Total		19	3	—		—		—		—		19	3
Joinville	2016	Série B	20	7	—		—		—		—		20	7
Grêmio	2017	Série A	12	0	2	0	0	0	2 (Note: Appearance(s) in Copa Libertadores)	0	3 (Note: One appearance in Primeira Liga, two appearances in FIFA Club World Cup)	0	19	0
Grêmio	2018	Série A	20	6	11	3	3	0	9	3	2 (Note: Appearance(s) in Recopa Sudamericana)	0	45	12
Grêmio	2019	Série A	0	0	3	2	0	0	0	0	—		3	2
Grêmio	Total		32	6	16	5	3	0	11	3	5	0	67	14
FC Tokyo	2019	J1 League	15	1	—		0	0	—		5 (Note: Appearance(s) in J.League Cup)	0	20	1
FC Tokyo U-23	2019	J3 League	6	3	—		—		—		—		6	3
Montedio Yamagata (loan)	2020	J2 League	14	1	—		—		—		1	0	15	1
Ceará	2021	Série A	15	2	2	0	0	0	4	0	5	3	26	5
Career total			283	79	98	35	19	6	21	3	18	4	439	127

== Honours ==
Joinville

- Campeonato Brasileiro Série B: 2014
- Campeonato Catarinense: 2015

Grêmio

- Copa Libertadores: 2017
- Recopa Sudamericana: 2018
- Campeonato Gaúcho: 2018
