= Gustavo Geladeira =

Brazilian footballer (born 1986)

Personal information
- Full name: Gustavo Silva Conceição
- Date of birth: February 20, 1986 (age 40)
- Place of birth: Cachoeiro de Itapemirim, Brazil
- Height: 1.85 m (6 ft 1 in)
- Position: Centre-back

Team information
- Current team: Boavista

Senior career*
Years	Team	Apps	(Gls)
2007–2010	Tigres do Brasil	11	(0)
2008	→ Potiguar (loan)		
2008	→ CRB (loan)		
2009	→ Duque de Caxias (loan)	22	(1)
2010	Ipatinga	1	(0)
2010–2011	Boavista	6	(1)
2010	→ Duque de Caxias (loan)	9	(0)
2011–2014	Flamengo	10	(0)
2012	→ Atlético Goianiense (loan)	23	(0)
2013	→ Boavista (loan)	14	(0)
2013	→ Ceará (loan)	12	(0)
2014	→ Boavista (loan)	14	(1)
2014	Vila Nova	16	(1)
2015	Orlando City	0	(0)
2015–2016	Mohun Bagan		
2016–2017	Vila Nova	5	(0)
2017	Boavista	6	(0)
2017–	Londrina	2	(0)
- * Club domestic league appearances and goals as of 18 July 2017 (UTC)

Gustavo Silva Conceição, simply known as Gustavo (born February 20, 1986) or Gustavo Geladeira (Gustavo Fridge), is a Brazilian footballer who plays as a centre-back for Londrina.

== Career ==
Gustavo Geladeira began his career with Tigres do Brasil and made his first team debut with the club during the 2009 Campeonato Carioca. While with Tigres Gustavo went on two loan spells with Duque de Caxias and also played for Ipatinga. In 2010, he joined Boavista and his play during the 2011 Campeonato Carioca attracted the interest of Brazilian Série A club Flamengo, the club Gustavo had supported as a child. On May 10, 2011 Gustavo signed with Flamengo. While with Flamengo Gustavo played in the Copa Libertadores and Copa Sudamericana. In April 2012 Gustavo was sent on loan to Atlético Goianiense and was an important player for the club appearing in 25 matches and scoring 1 goal during the 2012 Copa Sudamericana.

In 2013 Gustavo Geladeira was sent on loan to his former club Boavista and featured regularly for the side. In June 2013 he joined Ceará in the Campeonato Brasileiro Série B. The following season, he returned to Boavista for the Carioca season and helped the club win the 2014 Taça Rio scoring the winning goal in the final against Friburguense. After a successful stay with Boavista, Gustavo joined Vila Nova for the remainder of the 2014 season and made 16 league appearances and scored 1 goal for the club.

On January 5, 2015, Gustavo Geladeira signed with Major League Soccer club Orlando City SC.

On February 12, 2015 Gustavo Geladeira was waived by Orlando City SC without ever appearing in a match.

In June 2015, Gustavo Geladeira signed a new deal of 6 months with the reigning I League champion side Mohun Bagan. But after 2 weeks he was released by mohun bagan due to sudden weight loss and poor fitness level

== Career statistics ==
As of January 5, 2015

Appearances and goals by club, season and competition
Club	Season	State League		League		Copa do Brasil		Copa Libertadores		Copa Sudamericana		Total	
Club	Season	Apps	Goals	Apps	Goals	Apps	Goals	Apps	Goals	Apps	Goals	Apps	Goals
Tigres do Brasil	2009	4	0									4	0
Tigres do Brasil	2010	7	0									7	0
Duque de Caxias (loan)	2009			22	1							22	1
Ipatinga	2010			1	0							1	0
Duque de Caxias (loan)	2010			9	0							9	0
Boavista	2011	6	1									6	1
Flamengo	2011			3	0					3	0	6	0
Flamengo	2012	3	0	0	0			1	0			4	0
Flamengo	Total	3	0	3	0	-	-	1	0	3	0	10	0
Atlético Goianiense (loan)	2012			23	0					2	1	25	1
Boavista (loan)	2013	14	0									14	0
Ceará (loan)	2013			12	0							12	0
Boavista (loan)	2014	14	0			2	1					16	1
Vila Nova	2014			16	1							16	1
Career total		48	2	86	2	2	1	1	0	5	1	142	6
