= Willians (footballer, born 1986) =

Brazilian footballer

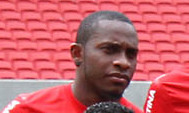
- Willians in 2014

Personal information
- Full name: Willians Domingos Fernandes
- Date of birth: 29 January 1986 (age 40)
- Place of birth: Praia Grande, Brazil
- Height: 1.75 m (5 ft 9 in)
- Position: Defensive midfielder

Youth career
- Santos
- Santo André

Senior career*
Years	Team	Apps	(Gls)
2007–2008	Santo André	57	(5)
2009–2012	Flamengo	91	(2)
2012–2013	Udinese	5	(0)
2013–2015	Internacional	59	(3)
2015–2018	Cruzeiro	29	(2)
2016	→ Corinthians (loan)	11	(0)
2017	→ Goiás (loan)	10	(0)
2018	CRB	2	(0)
2019	São Caetano	0	(0)
- * Club domestic league appearances and goals

Willians Domingos Fernandes (born 29 January 1986), known as Willians, is a Brazilian former professional footballer who played as a defensive midfielder.

== Career ==
=== Flamengo ===
Born in Praia Grande, São Paulo, Willians debuted for Flamengo playing in the first team in the season opener against Friburguense in the 2009 Rio de Janeiro State League.

On the 2009 Brazilian Série A Willians led the league in ball stealing. On 27 January 2010 Willians renewed his contract with Flamengo for another four years, until December 2014, with a release fee set for €10 million. In March 2011 Willians renewed his contract again. On 7 June 2012, Willians was confirmed by Udinese. On the website of the Italian side, he was nicknamed as "pitbull" and "bulldog".

=== Internacional ===
On 11 January 2012, Willians was bought by circa of €2.5 million and will defend, in 2013, Internacional, a Brazilian side. He will be a substitute for Guiñazú, who left the club and current is player of Paraguayan side Libertad.

== Career statistics ==
Appearances and goals by club, season and competition
Club	Season	League		Copa do Brasil		Copa Libertadores		Copa Sudamericana		State League		Total	
Club	Season	Apps	Goals	Apps	Goals	Apps	Goals	Apps	Goals	Apps	Goals	Apps	Goals
Santo André	2007	27	2	–		–		–		–		27	2
Santo André	2008	30	3	–		–		–		–		30	3
Santo André	Total	57	5	0	0	0	0	0	0	0	0	57	5
Flamengo	2009	31	1	6	1	–		2	0	17	1	56	3
Flamengo	2010	29	0	–		9	0	–		12	0	50	0
Flamengo	2011	31	1	6	1	–		3	0	17	0	57	2
Flamengo	2012	0	0	–		6	0	–		8	0	13	0
Flamengo	Total	91	2	12	2	15	0	5	0	54	1	176	5
Internacional	2013	31	3	8	0	–		–		8	1	47	4
Internacional	2014	28	0	4	0	–		1	0	10	0	43	0
Internacional	Total	59	3	12	0	0	0	1	0	18	1	121	4
Cruzeiro	2015	29	2	0	0	9	0	–		3	0	41	2
Corinthians	2016	5	0	1	0	4	0	0	0	9	0	19	0
Career total		241	12	25	2	28	0	6	0	84	2	414	16

- In 2007 and 2008 Willians played for Santo André in the Brazilian Série B.

== Honours ==
Flamengo

- Rio de Janeiro State League: 2009, 2011
- Brazilian Série A: 2009

Internacional

- Campeonato Gaúcho: 2013, 2014

Individual

- 2011 Campeonato Carioca Best Defensive Midfielder
