= Renato Abreu =

Brazilian footballer

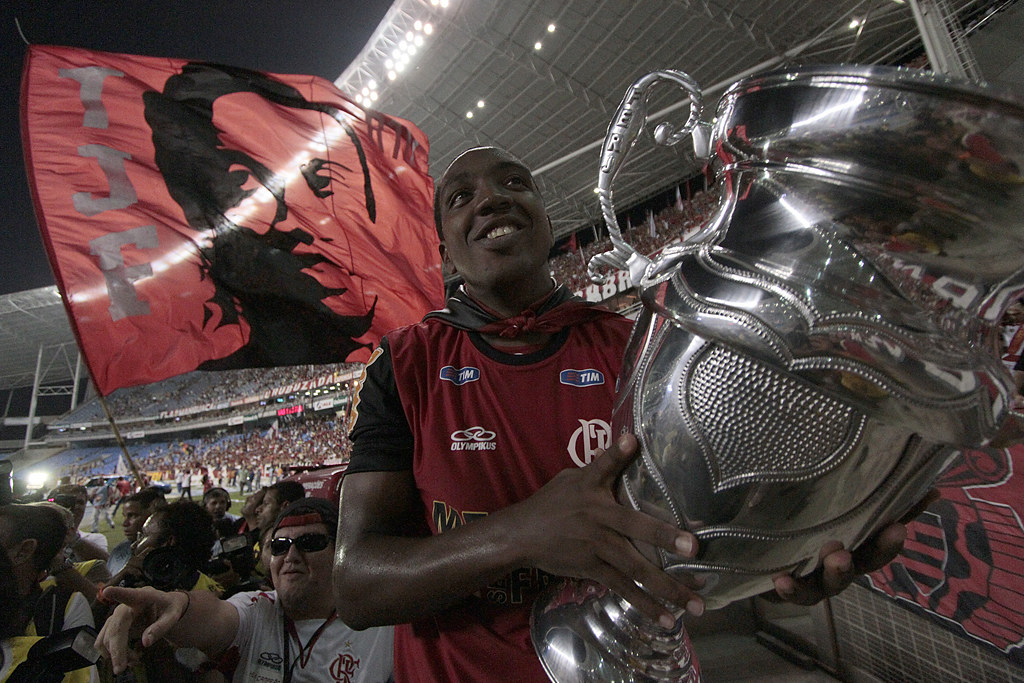

Personal information
- Full name: Carlos Renato de Abreu
- Date of birth: 9 June 1978 (age 48)
- Place of birth: São Paulo, Brazil
- Height: 1.83 m (6 ft 0 in)
- Position: Central midfielder

Youth career
- Barcelona-SP

Senior career*
| Years | Team | Apps | (Gls) |
| 1998 | Marcílio Dias | 0 | (0) |
| 1999 | Joinville | 0 | (0) |
| 2000 | União Barbarense | 0 | (0) |
| 2000–2001 | Guarani | 22 | (2) |
| 2001–2005 | Corinthians | 112 | (13) |
| 2005–2007 | Flamengo | 77 | (23) |
| 2007–2008 | Al-Nasr | 23 | (12) |
| 2008–2010 | Al-Shabab | 44 | (13) |
| 2010–2013 | Flamengo | 87 | (16) |
| 2013 | Santos | 9 | (1) |
| Total | | 374 | (78) |

International career
| 2011 | Brazil | 1 | (0) |
- * Club domestic league appearances and goals

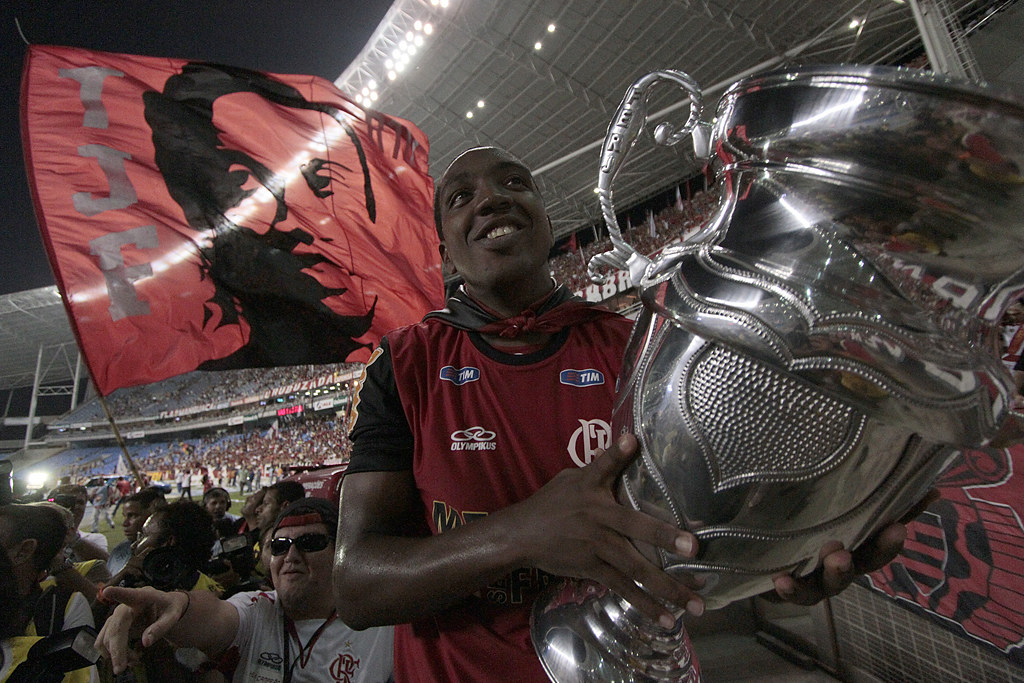
Image of Abreu in 2011

Carlos Renato de Abreu (born 9 June 1978), known as Renato or Renato Abreu, is a Brazilian former association football centre midfielder.

Specialising in free kicks and long shots, Renato was recognised by the press and fans as one of the most important players in Flamengo's triumph in the 2006 Copa do Brasil, and the Campeonato Brasileiro of the same year being named in the team of the year.

== Career ==
Renato starts his career in Santa Catarina playing at Marcílio Dias and Joinville. In 2000, he moved away to São Paulo and played for União Barbarense. A year later, Renato was transferred to Guarani.

Because of his great performances he was bought by Corinthians where he won some titles, such as Torneio Rio-São Paulo, Brazilian Cup and São Paulo State League.

In 2005, Renato arrived at Flamengo was considered one of the club's best players during his time, between 2005 and 2007. Renato has been the Flamengo's top scorer in two seasons (2005 and 2006), won the 2006 Copa do Brasil, against Vasco da Gama. During 2006 and 2007 he was the team's captain. In 2007, he continued playing well and winning championships such Taça Guanabara and Rio de Janeiro State League. But on 10 July 2007, Flamengo announced his transfer to Al-Nasr, a club in the UAE from where he moved to Al-Shabab.

In 2011, he was called up by coach Mano Menezes for the national team for the first leg of the Superclasico de las Américas against Argentina; Renato played 61 minutes and was replaced by Oscar, having a discrete participation in the eventual 0–0 draw. Brazil eventually won 2–0 on aggregate, and Renato did not play in the second leg.

=== Career statistics ===
(Correct as of March 12, 2013)

| Club | Season | Carioca League | | Brazilian Série A | | Copa do Brasil | | Copa Libertadores | | Copa Sudamericana | | Total | |
| Club | Season | Apps | Goals | Apps | Goals | Apps | Goals | Apps | Goals | Apps | Goals | Apps | Goals |
|---|---|---|---|---|---|---|---|---|---|---|---|---|---|
| Flamengo | 2005 | 6 | 2 | 38 | 12 | - | - | - | - | - | - | 44 | 14 |
| Flamengo | 2006 | 8 | 2 | 33 | 9 | 12 | 6 | - | - | - | - | 53 | 17 |
| Flamengo | 2007 | 13 | 4 | 6 | 2 | - | - | 8 | 5 | - | - | 27 | 11 |
| Flamengo | 2010 | - | - | 22 | 4 | - | - | - | - | - | - | 22 | 4 |
| Flamengo | 2011 | 17 | 2 | 36 | 5 | 6 | 2 | - | - | 3 | 0 | 62 | 8 |
| Flamengo | 2012 | 7 | 1 | 25 | 6 | - | - | 3 | 0 | - | - | 35 | 7 |
| Flamengo | 2013 | 9 | 4 | 4 | 1 | 4 | 2 | - | - | - | - | 17 | 7 |
| Total | | 60 | 15 | 164 | 39 | 22 | 10 | 11 | 5 | 3 | 0 | 250 | 68 |

according to combined sources on the Flamengo official website and Flestatística.

== Honours ==
Corinthians

- São Paulo State League: 2001, 2003
- Rio-São Paulo Tournament: 2002
- Copa do Brasil: 2002

Flamengo

- Copa do Brasil: 2006 2013
- Taça Guanabara: 2007, 2011
- Taça Rio: 2011
- Rio de Janeiro State League: 2007, 2011

=== Individual ===
- Campeonato Brasileiro Série A Team of the Year: 2006
- 2011 Campeonato Carioca Best Defensive Central Midfielder
