= Caio Quiroga =

Brazilian footballer (born 1994)

Personal information
- Full name: Caio Fábio Gabriel Quiroga
- Date of birth: 7 June 1994 (age 32)
- Place of birth: Rio de Janeiro, Brazil
- Height: 1.76 m (5 ft 9 in)
- Position: Midfielder

Youth career
- Olaria (Futsal)
- 2004–2016: Flamengo

Senior career*
Years	Team	Apps	(Gls)
2015–2016	Flamengo	0	(0)
2015	→ ASA (loan)	0	(0)
2015	→ Ituano (loan)		
2016–2017	Luverdense	3	(0)
2017–2018	Sobrado	28	(2)
2018–2019	Covilhã	14	(1)
2019	Votuporanguense		
- * Club domestic league appearances and goals as of 22:38, 7 January 2019 (UTC)

Caio Fábio Gabriel Quiroga (born 7 June 1994), commonly known as Caio Quiroga, is a Brazilian footballer who plays as a midfielder, most recently for Votuporanguense

== Career ==
Quiroga left Covilhã on 26 January 2019 by mutual consent.

== Career statistics ==
As of 7 January 2019

Club	Season	League			National Cup		League Cup		Other		Total	
Club	Season	Division	Apps	Goals	Apps	Goals	Apps	Goals	Apps	Goals	Apps	Goals
Flamengo	2015	Série A	0	0	0	0	–		0	0	0	0
ASA (loan)	2015	Série C	0	0	0	0	–		0	0	0	0
Luverdense	2016	Série B	3	0	0	0	–		2 (Note: Appearances in the Copa Verde)	0	5	0
Luverdense	2017	Série B	0	0	0	0	–		2	0	2	0
Luverdense	Total		3	0	0	0	0	0	4	0	7	0
Sobrado	2017–18	Elite Série 2 AF Porto	28	2	0	0	–		0	0	28	2
Covilhã	2018–19	LigaPro	14	1	1 (Note: Appearances in the Taça de Portugal)	0	1 (Note: Appearances in the Taça da Liga)	0	0	0	16	1
Career total			45	1	1	0	1	0	4	0	51	1
