= Lucas Zen =

Brazilian footballer (born 1991)

Personal information
- Full name: Lucas Lacerda Lima Gonçalves
- Date of birth: June 17, 1991 (age 35)
- Place of birth: Rio de Janeiro, Brazil
- Height: 1.81 m (5 ft 11 in)
- Position: Defensive midfielder

Team information
- Current team: America-RJ

Youth career
- 2005–2009: Botafogo

Senior career*
Years	Team	Apps	(Gls)
2010–2016	Botafogo	72	(0)
2014	→ Vitória (loan)	3	(0)
2016	→ Paysandu (loan)	0	(0)
2017	Brasiliense		
2018	AA Portuguesa	0	(0)
2019	Barra da Tijuca	0	(0)
2020–	America-RJ	0	(0)
- * Club domestic league appearances and goals

Lucas Zen (born June 17, 1991) is a Brazilian professional footballer who plays as a defensive midfielder for America-RJ.

== Career ==
Zen was born in Rio de Janeiro. He made his professional debut for Botafogo in 2010.

== Career statistics ==
(Correct as of October 16, 2010)

Club	Season	State League		Brazilian Série A		Copa do Brasil		Copa Libertadores		Copa Sudamericana		Total	
Club	Season	Apps	Goals	Apps	Goals	Apps	Goals	Apps	Goals	Apps	Goals	Apps	Goals
Botafogo	2010	-	-	0	0	-	-	-	-	-	-	0	0
Total		-	-	0	0	-	-	-	-	-	-	0	0
