= Marcelo Valverde =

Brazilian footballer (born 1989)

Personal information
- Full name: Marcelo dos Santos Farias Valverde
- Date of birth: 21 November 1989 (age 36)
- Place of birth: Rio de Janeiro, Brazil
- Height: 1.85 m (6 ft 1 in)
- Position: Goalkeeper

Youth career
- 2003–2009: Flamengo

Senior career*
Years	Team	Apps	(Gls)
2010–2011	Flamengo	0	(0)
2010	→ CFZ (loan)	0	(0)
2011	Angra dos Reis	0	(0)
2011–2012	Nacional	15	(0)
2012–2015	União Madeira	0	(0)
2014	→ SE Gama (loan)	2	(0)
2015	Anápolis	0	(0)
2015–2017	SE Gama	0	(0)
2016	Castanhal	0	(0)
2017	Nacional-AM	0	(0)
2018	Bragantino-PA	0	(0)
2018	Nacional-AM	7	(0)
2018–2019	Lusitanos	32	(0)
2020–2021	Torreense	32	(0)
2021–2023	Os Belenenses	28	(0)
2022–2023	→ União de Santarém (loan)	18	(0)
2023–2026	Lusitano de Évora	44	(0)
- * Club domestic league appearances and goals

Marcelo dos Santos Farias Valverde, better known as Marcelo Valverde (born 21 November 1989), is a Brazilian former football goalkeeper.

== Career ==
Marcelo Valverde, Marcelinho, began his career in a small school that was held in the condominium where he lives. However, at 10 years, driven by a friend of his father to the Estádio da Gávea, auditioned for the team of Flamengo, has been approved, and is there today, with much success in the youth ranks of red-black.

The young archer is currently the team's youth club, where he has won several titles. Among them, the tricampeonato state under-19 and the same state, however, the Under-17, and Copa OPG and Copa Belo Horizonte.

Next season, in 2008, the goalkeeper will have 19 years, and thus may continue to participate in disputes in the juniors, if not promoted to the professional team.

Marcelo had a defining moment in his career still in the year 2007. When the Brazilian team went to Rio de Janeiro to face Ecuador in a match valid for the 2010 FIFA World Cup qualification, the team trained at Gávea, and Marcelo was called to attend the training.

The year also marked the third place team of Flamengo in the Champions Youth Cup, mundial interclubes U-19 category, where Marcelo was the goalkeeper and one of the highlights of the campaign.

On 1 June 2011, Marcelo joined Primeira Liga side Nacional.

=== Career statistics ===
(Correct As of 16 October 2010)

Club	Season	State League		Brazilian Série A		Copa do Brasil		Copa Libertadores		Copa Sudamericana		Total	
Club	Season	Apps	Goals	Apps	Goals	Apps	Goals	Apps	Goals	Apps	Goals	Apps	Goals
Flamengo	2010	-	-	-	-	-	-	-	-	-	-	0	0
CFZ (loan)	2010	?	?	-	-	-	-	-	-	-	-	?	?
Total		?	?	-	-	-	-	-	-	-	-	?	?

according to combined sources on the Flamengo official website and Flaestatística.

== Honours ==
- Flamengo
  - Campeonato Carioca de Juniores: 2005, 2006, 2007
  - Campeonato Carioca de Juvenis: 2006
  - Copa Macaé de Juvenis: 2006
  - Taça OPG: 2006
  - Taça Belo Horizonte de Juniores: 2006, 2007
