= Lucão (footballer, born 1990) =

Brazilian footballer

Personal information
- Full name: Lucas Galdino de Paiva
- Date of birth: 28 June 1990 (age 36)
- Place of birth: Rio de Janeiro, Brazil
- Height: 1.85 m (6 ft 1 in)
- Position: Centre-back

Youth career
- Bangu
- Fluminense
- 2006–2009: Flamengo

Senior career*
Years	Team	Apps	(Gls)
2008–2012	Flamengo	0	(0)
2010	→ CFZ (loan)	0	(0)
2011	→ Duque de Caxias (loan)	8	(0)
2012	→ Macaé (loan)	0	(0)

International career
2007	Brazil U-17	0	(0)
- * Club domestic league appearances and goals

Lucas Galdino de Paiva, or simply Lucão, (born 28 June 1990) is a Brazilian former professional footballer who played as a centre-back.

== Career ==
=== Early life ===
Lucas Galdino was born in Rio de Janeiro in 1990. He played in the youth team of Flamengo in 2007. Grand Commander of the back four, the team captain is also part of the Brazil national team category, and participated in the 2007 Pan American Games, and the Campeonatos Mundial and the South American Under-17 Football Championship.

=== Youth career ===
He began his career at six years old, in Bangu, adjacent to the goalkeeper Marcelo Carné. From there, he was acting in futsal for Fluminense. But if it was signed in the field and at Flamengo youth team, where he plays alongside major players such as Vinícius Paquetá, Guilherme Camacho and Michael.

=== Flamengo ===
He made his first workout in first team in 2008 in a triangular organized by the then coach of the Flamengo Caio Júnior.

== Career statistics ==
(Correct as of 5 December 2011)

Appearances and goals by club, season and competition
Club	Season	State League		Brazilian Série A		Copa do Brasil		Copa Libertadores		Copa Sudamericana		Total	
Club	Season	Apps	Goals	Apps	Goals	Apps	Goals	Apps	Goals	Apps	Goals	Apps	Goals
Flamengo	2008	-	-	0	0	—		—		—		0	0
Flamengo	2009	-	—		—		—		—		-	0	0
Flamengo	2010	-	—		—		—		—		-	0	0
CFZ (loan)	2010	0	0	—		—		—		—		0	0
Duque de Caxias (loan)	2011	7	0	8	0	—		—		—		15	0
Total		7	0	8	0	-	-	-	-	-	-	15	0

according to combined sources on the Flamengo official website and Flaestatística.
