= Héracles =

Brazilian footballer (born 1992)

Personal information
- Full name: Héracles Paiva Aguiar
- Date of birth: September 18, 1992 (age 34)
- Place of birth: Caucaia, Brazil
- Height: 1.72 m (5 ft 7 1/2 in)
- Position: Left back

Youth career
- 2008–2010: Atlético Paranaense

Senior career*
Years	Team	Apps	(Gls)
2010–2014	Atlético Paranaense	26	(1)
2013–2014	→ Avaí (loan)	18	(2)
2015	Joinville	3	(0)
2016	J. Malucelli	0	(0)
2017	Ypiranga	7	(0)
- * Club domestic league appearances and goals as of 24 February 2018

Héracles Paiva Aguiar (born September 18, 1992), better known as Héracles, is a retired Brazilian footballer. He most recently played for Ypiranga as a left back.

== Career ==
He started his career at Atlético Paranaense in 2010, before moving to Avaí in 2013. He was signed by Ceará in 2015.

=== Career statistics ===
(Correct as of October 16, 2010)

Club	Season	State League		Brazilian Série A		Copa do Brasil		Copa Libertadores		Copa Sudamericana		Total	
Club	Season	Apps	Goals	Apps	Goals	Apps	Goals	Apps	Goals	Apps	Goals	Apps	Goals
Atlético Paranaense	2010	-	-	2	0	-	-	-	-	-	-	2	0
Total		-	-	2	0	-	-	-	-	-	-	2	0
