= Claudio Maldonado =

Chilean footballer (born 1980)

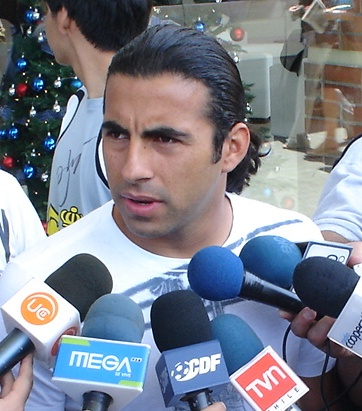
- Maldonado in 2006

Personal information
- Full name: Claudio Andrés del Tránsito; Maldonado Rivera
- Date of birth: 3 January 1980 (age 46)
- Place of birth: Curicó, Chile
- Height: 1.74 m (5 ft 8 1/2 in)
- Position: Defensive midfielder

Youth career
- Escuela Municipal Curicó
- 1997–1998: Colo-Colo

Senior career*
Years	Team	Apps	(Gls)
1998–2000	Colo-Colo	29	(2)
2000–2003	São Paulo	36	(0)
2003–2005	Cruzeiro	92	(4)
2006–2007	Santos	34	(0)
2008–2009	Fenerbahçe	17	(0)
2009–2012	Flamengo	38	(1)
2013	Corinthians	7	(0)
2014–2015	Colo-Colo	21	(0)
Total		274	(7)

International career
1997	Chile U17		
1998	Chile U20		
2000	Chile Olympic		
2000–2010	Chile	44	(1)

Managerial career
- 2018: Colo-Colo (assistant)
- 2019: Real Garcilaso (assistant)
- 2020: CSA (assistant)
- 2020–2022: Red Bull Bragantino (assistant)
- 2020: Red Bull Bragantino (caretaker)
- 2023: Vasco da Gama (assistant)
- 2024: Juárez (assistant)
- 2025: Athletico Paranaense (assistant)
Medal record
Representing Chile
Men's Football
Bronze medal – third place	2000 Sydney	Team competition
- * Club domestic league appearances and goals

Claudio Andrés del Tránsito Maldonado Rivera (born 3 January 1980) is a Chilean professional football coach and former player. Since 2020, he has been working as Maurício Barbieri's assistant coach.

He formerly played as a defensive midfielder for clubs as Colo-Colo, São Paulo, Cruzeiro, Santos, Fenerbahçe, Flamengo and Corinthians.

== Playing career ==
=== Early career ===
As a child, Maldonado was with Escuela de Fútbol Municipal de Curicó (Municipal Football Academy of Curicó), later named Juventud 2000, what was founded by the former professional footballer Luis Hernán Álvarez. Next, he moved to Colo-Colo youth ranks after being seen by Néstor Pékerman.

=== São Paulo ===
He spent three seasons with São Paulo making 36 Campeonato Brasileiro Série A appearances with the team.

=== Cruzeiro ===
In May 2003, Vanderlei Luxemburgo, then coach of Cruzeiro, bought the services of Maldonado. At the time of the purchase, Maldonado's then girlfriend was Luxemburgo's daughter. Nevertheless, while with Cruzeiro, Maldonado experienced the most success of his career. In 2003, he played for the first team in the history of Brazilian football to win the triple crown.

=== Santos ===
For the 2006 season, Maldonado was reunited with former Cruzeiro's coach Luxemburgo at Santos for a fee of $4.5 million. However at the end of the Brazilian season was scheduled to have ankle surgery which caused him to miss up to two months. After recuperating Maldonado continued playing for Santos reaching the semi-finals of the 2007 Copa Libertadores. Currently Santos has completed the 2007 Campeonato Brasileiro Série A in second place and are eligible to compete in the upcoming Copa Libertadores 2008. He was being tracked by Fenerbahçe, Milan, Real Madrid and Ajax but no firm offers better than Fenerbahçe have been made. At 28 he was at the peak of his potential and European teams wanted to capitalise on this, but they were probably put off by the 8 red cards that he had received in the previous 3 years at club level.

=== Fenerbahçe ===
On the beginning of 2008 Maldonado signed with Fenerbahçe in 1 1/2-year contract, at that time managed by Zico. The transaction was via C.A. Rentistas, which the proxy club paid Santos R$2,225,040. He struggled with injuries and spend a little more than a year in the Turkish club.

=== Flamengo ===
On August 27, 2009, Flamengo signed a 1-year contract with Maldonado. His debut for his new club was as a substitute in a 3–0 win against Santo André, but since his second match became a first team player. In his first ten matches Flamengo did not suffer any goals, nine of those playing along with Álvaro which signed with Flamengo at the same time, proving his was back at his high level. He scored his first goal for Flamengo after just few matches on November 8 against Atlético Mineiro. His good moment made Chile national team coach Marcelo Bielsa call him up to national team after a period absent. But his return to national team, on November 17 against Slovakia, wasn't as expected, Maldonado played well as a starter, although in the second half he suffered a serious injury in his left knee ligaments leaving out of the fields for four months. Maldonado signed a new 6-month contract in August 2010 and a 2-year contract in January 2011.

== Coaching career ==
In 2018, Maldonado started his coaching journey as an assistant coach to Héctor Tapia at Colo-Colo, the club where he began his professional career and retired from three years prior. He followed Tapia to Real Garcilaso in 2019. In 2020, he joined Maurício Barbieri as his assistant coach at CSA, continuing to work together at Red Bull Bragantino and later at Vasco da Gama. In 2024, he followed him to Mexican club Juárez and Athletico Paranaense.

== Career statistics ==
As of 6 September 2020.

Club	Season	League			Cup		Continental		Other		Total	
Club	Season	Division	Apps	Goals	Apps	Goals	Apps	Goals	Apps	Goals	Apps	Goals
São Paulo	2000	Série A	11	0	6	1	–		–		17	1
São Paulo	2001	Série A	10	0	2	0	–		–		12	0
São Paulo	2002	Série A	15	0	6	0	–		–		21	0
São Paulo	2003	Série A	–		2	0	–		–		2	0
São Paulo	Total		36	0	16	1	0	0	0	0	52	1
Cruzeiro	2003	Série A	28	0	–		1 (Note: Appearance(s) in Copa Sudamericana.)	0	–		29	0
Cruzeiro	2004	Série A	33	3	–		11 (Note: Seven appearances in Copa Libertadores, four appearances in Copa Sudamericana.)	0	13 (Note: Appearance(s) in Campeonato Mineiro.)	0	57	3
Cruzeiro	2005	Série A	31	1	7	0	–		11	0	49	1
Cruzeiro	Total		92	4	7	0	12	0	24	0	131	4
Santos	2006	Série A	19	0	3	0	–		18 (Note: Appearance(s) in Campeonato Paulista.)	0	40	0
Santos	2007	Série A	15	0	–		12 (Note: Appearance(s) in Copa Libertadores.)	1	17	0	44	1
Santos	Total		34	0	3	0	12	1	35	0	84	1
Fenerbahçe	2007-08	Süper Lig	8	0	0	0	2 (Note: Appearance(s) in Campeonato Carioca.)	0	–		10	0
Fenerbahçe	2008-09	Süper Lig	9	0	1	0	7	0	–		17	0
Fenerbahçe	Total		17	0	1	0	9	0	0	0	27	0
Flamengo	2009	Série A	13	1	–		–		–		13	1
Flamengo	2010	Série A	17	0	-	-	6	0	5 (Note: Appearance(s) in Campeonato Carioca.)	0	28	0
Flamengo	2011	Série A	8	0	3	0	2	0	12	0	25	0
Flamengo	2012	Série A	0	0	0	0	1	0	8	0	9	0
Flamengo	Total		38	1	3	0	9	0	25	0	75	1
Corinthians	2013	Série A	7	0	1	0	–		–		8	0
Colo-Colo	2014–15	Primera División	21	0	1	0	–		–		22	0
Career total			245	5	32	1	42	1	84	0	406	7

== International ==
Along with Chile U20, he won the L'Alcúdia Tournament in 1998.

Maldonado was selected to represent his country, Chile, at the 2000 Summer Olympics as a part of the Under-23 team that won the bronze medal. Maldonado made his international debut on February 12, 2000, in a match versus Bulgaria. Since then Maldonado has appeared in 41 games with the senior squad and has netted one goal. For 2006 FIFA World Cup qualification, Maldonado was a regular with the first team and has since gained the captaincy of the national team. As of recent Maldonado has been called up to serve on the Chile national team that is managed by Marcelo Bielsa.

=== International goals ===
#	Date	Venue	Opponent	Score	Result	Competition
1.	9 February 2005	Viña del Mar, Chile	Ecuador	3–0	Win	Friendly

== Honours ==
=== Player ===
Colo-Colo

- Primera División: 1998, 2014 Clausura

São Paulo

- Campeonato Paulista: 2000, 2002

Cruzeiro

- Campeonato Brasileiro Série A: 2003
- Campeonato Mineiro: 2004

Santos

- Campeonato Paulista: 2006, 2007

Fenerbahçe

- UEFA Champions League Quarter-Finals(1): 2008

Flamengo

- Campeonato Brasileiro Série A: 2009
- Campeonato Carioca: 2011

Corinthians

- Recopa Sudamericana: 2013

Chile U20

- L'Alcúdia International Tournament (1): 1998

Chile Olympic

- Sydney Olympic Games: Bronze medal (bronze)
