= Alex Silva (footballer, born 1985) =

Brazilian footballer

Personal information
- Full name: Alex Sandro da Silva
- Date of birth: 10 March 1985 (age 41)
- Place of birth: Amparo, Brazil
- Height: 1.93 m (6 ft 4 in)
- Position: Centre back

Youth career
- 2002–2003: Ponte Preta

Senior career*
Years	Team	Apps	(Gls)
2003–2005	Vitória	36	(0)
2005	→ Rennes (loan)	0	(0)
2006–2008	São Paulo	45	(5)
2008–2011	Hamburger SV	17	(0)
2010–2011	→ São Paulo (loan)	33	(0)
2011–2013	Flamengo	17	(0)
2012	→ Cruzeiro (loan)	18	(0)
2013–2014	Boa Esporte	5	(0)
2014–2015	São Bernardo	4	(0)
2015	Brasiliense	4	(0)
2016	Rio Claro	8	(0)
2016	Hercílio Luz	0	(0)
2017–2019	Wilstermann	80	(5)
Total		267	(10)

International career
2008	Brazil U23	6	(0)
2007	Brazil	2	(0)

Managerial career
- 2022: Brasília U20
- 2023: Brasília (interim)
- 2024: Poços de Caldas
Medal record
Men's football
Representing Brazil
Copa América
Winner	2007 Venezuela
Olympic Games
Bronze medal – third place	2008 Beijing	Team
- * Club domestic league appearances and goals

Alex Sandro da Silva or simply Alex Silva (born 10 March 1985) is a Brazilian professional football coach and former player who played as a central defender.

== Club career ==
Alex Silva was born in Amparo, São Paulo.

On 23 January 2010, Alex Silva returned to São Paulo on loan from Hamburger SV until July 2011.

Alex Silva retired in June 2019, aged 34.

== International career ==
Uncapped Alex Silva was chosen for the 2007 Copa América in Venezuela, for which Dunga rested several established players. He made his only tournament appearance for the eventual winners on 4 July, playing the final ten minutes of a 1–0 group win over Ecuador as a substitute for Dani Alves. On 22 August that year he played his only other game for Brazil, starting a 2–0 friendly win over Algeria in Montpellier, France.

Alex Silva was on Brazil's under-23 team that won the bronze medal at the 2008 Olympics in China.

== Personal life ==
Alex Silva is the younger brother of Luisão, a defender who spent most of his career with Portugal's S.L. Benfica and was an international teammate. In his late 20s, he became a born-again Christian, and expressed a desire to work as a pastor or missionary in his retirement.

== Career statistics ==
As of 25 January 2013

Appearances and goals by club, season and competition
Club	Season	League			State league		National cup (Note: Includes DFB-Pokal, Copa do Brasil)		Continental		Other		Total	
Club	Season	Division	Apps	Goals	Apps	Goals	Apps	Goals	Apps	Goals	Apps	Goals	Apps	Goals
Hamburger SV	2008–09	Bundesliga	17	0	—		—		6 (Note: Appearances in Europa League)	0	—		23	0
São Paulo (loan)	2010	Série A	21	0	9	0	—		10 (Note: Appearances in Copa Libertadores)	1	—		40	1
São Paulo (loan)	2011	Série A			13	0	6	0	—		—		19	0
São Paulo (loan)	Total		21	0	22	0	6	0	10	1	0	0	59	1
Flamengo	2012	Série A	17	0	—		—		1 (Note: Appearances in Copa Sudamericana)	0	—		18	0
Flamengo	2013	Série A	0	0	1	0	0	0	—		—		1	0
Flamengo	Total		17	0	1	0	0	0	1	0	0	0	19	0
Career total			55	0	23	0	6	0	17	1	0	0	101	1

== Honours ==
Vitória

- Campeonato Baiano: 2003, 2004

São Paulo

- Campeonato Brasileiro Série A: 2006, 2007, 2008

Brazil

- Copa América: 2007
- Summer Olympic Bronze medal: Beijing 2008
