= Hélder (footballer, born 1984) =

Brazilian footballer

Personal information
- Full name: Hélder de Paula Santos
- Date of birth: 20 June 1984 (age 42)
- Place of birth: Florianópolis, Brazil
- Height: 1.80 m (5 ft 11 in)
- Position: Defensive midfielder

Team information
- Current team: Guarani

Youth career
- –2009: Palmeiras

Senior career*
Years	Team	Apps	(Gls)
2003–2005	Porto	0	(0)
2005	→ Corinthians AL (loan)	0	(0)
2005	→ Sergipe (loan)	0	(0)
2006–2008	Palmeiras	0	(0)
2008	CRB	0	(0)
2009	Votoraty	15	(3)
2010–2014	Bahia	78	(4)
2014	→ Coritiba (loan)	21	(2)
2015–2016	Coritiba	10	(0)
2015	→ Paraná (loan)	5	(0)
2017	Figueirense	1	(0)
2018–	Guarani	0	(0)
- * Club domestic league appearances and goals as of 2 January 2018

Hélder de Paula Santos commonly known as Hélder (born 20 June 1984) is a Brazilian footballer who plays as a defensive midfielder for Guarani FC.
