= Lorran (footballer, born 1993) =

Brazilian footballer

Personal information
- Full name: Michel Lorran Rodrigues Mota
- Date of birth: 10 January 1993 (age 33)
- Place of birth: Belém, Brazil
- Position: Midfielder

Senior career*
Years	Team	Apps	(Gls)
-2014	Flamengo	2	(0)
2014	Audax→(loan)		
2014	Madureira	2	(0)
2015	Grêmio Anápolis	6	(0)
2015	Tupi	0	(0)
2016	Brasília		
2016	Rio Branco	0	(0)
2017	Bangu	4	(0)
2017	Al Tadhamon	0	(0)
2018	SC São Paulo	3	(0)
- * Club domestic league appearances and goals

Michel Lorran Rodrigues Mota (born 10 January 1993 in Brazil), known as just Lorran, is a Brazilian footballer.

== Career ==
Named after Lucien Laurent, the scorer of the first-ever World Cup goal, Lorran started his career with Flamengo, receiving praise from coach Vanderlei Luxemburgo and the team's star players, including Ronaldinho during his first professional training session. However, each time he tried to join the first team he was told it was too early and barely featured for the club. After Flamengo refused offers from Europe, he asked to leave for Madueira for game time despite his father's opposition, where he was injured immediately.

In 2018, Lorran was shot in the leg while in a car with drug trafficker Cesar Augusto Oliveira Ferreira, who was killed.
