= Maxwell (footballer, born 1989) =

Brazilian footballer

Personal information
- Full name: Maxwell Batista da Silva
- Date of birth: 23 October 1989 (age 37)
- Place of birth: Camacan, Brazil
- Height: 1.72 m (5 ft 8 in)
- Position: Left back

Youth career
- 2006–2011: Flamengo
- 2006: → Artsul (loan)

Senior career*
| Years | Team | Apps | (Gls) |
| 2009–2011 | Flamengo | 3 | (0) |
| 2011 | → Duque de Caxias (loan) | 4 | (0) |
| 2012 | Corinthians Alagoano | | |
| 2013 | Colorado-PR | | |
| 2014 | Guaratinguetá | | |
| 2015 | Desportiva Ferroviária | | |
| 2016 | Boca Júnior | | |
| 2016–2017 | Sergipe | | |
| 2017 | Murici | | |
| 2017–2018 | Jacuipense | | |
| 2018 | Sergipe | | |

International career
| 2009–? | Brazil U-20 | | |
- * Club domestic league appearances and goals

Maxwell Batista da Silva (born 23 October 1989), simply known as Maxwell, is a Brazilian footballer who plays as a left back. Early in his career he was known as Jorbison (alleged full name Jorbison Reis dos Santos, allegedly born 30 December 1991). He admitted his real age on 7 March 2012.

== Club career ==
At the start of his career, Maxwell played under the false name Jorbison Reis dos Santos and date of birth 30 December 1991. This allowed him to play at a lower age group than he should have. Jorbison was seen as a great promise in the youth ranks of Flamengo. He debuted for Flamengo coming off the bench on 12 July 2009 in the 2–2 draw against São Paulo on a 2009 Brazilian Série A match. After good performances in the youth category, he quickly passed through the youth team, where he played the Copa São Paulo de Futebol Júnior and youth Rio de Janeiro State League in 2008 and was promoted in 2009, after playing many good matches games for the youth team that year, conditioning the team to be professional the immediate booking of Juan at left back. The pair came to Flamengo in 2006, after defending the team's Artsul in mid-2006. He stood out and caught the interest of Flamengo, who took him to Gávea in 2007.

In 2009, he was called up to the Brazil under-20s squad. He played for Brazil against Mexico in 2010. In 2011, Jorbison was loaned to Duque de Caxias.

In January 2012, Flamengo terminated his contract. A few days later, he signed for Corinthians Alagoano under his real fullname, Maxwell Batista da Silva. In March 2012, Maxwell admitted to having used a fraudulent name and date of birth. He later played for Colorado-PR and Guaratinguetá. In 2015, he signed for Desportiva Ferroviária. Ahead of the 2017–18 season, he signed for Jacuipense.

== Honours ==
Flamengo

- Brazilian Série A: 2009
