= Univassouras Artsul Futebol Clube =

Brazilian football club

Univassouras Artsul FC
- Full name: Univassouras Artsul FC
- Founded: 26 August 2025
- Stadium: Estádio Nivaldo Pereira
- Capacity: 2184
- President: Nivaldo Pereira
- Head Coach: Cleimar Rocha
- League: Campeonato Carioca - Série B1; Copa Rio
Home colours	Away colours

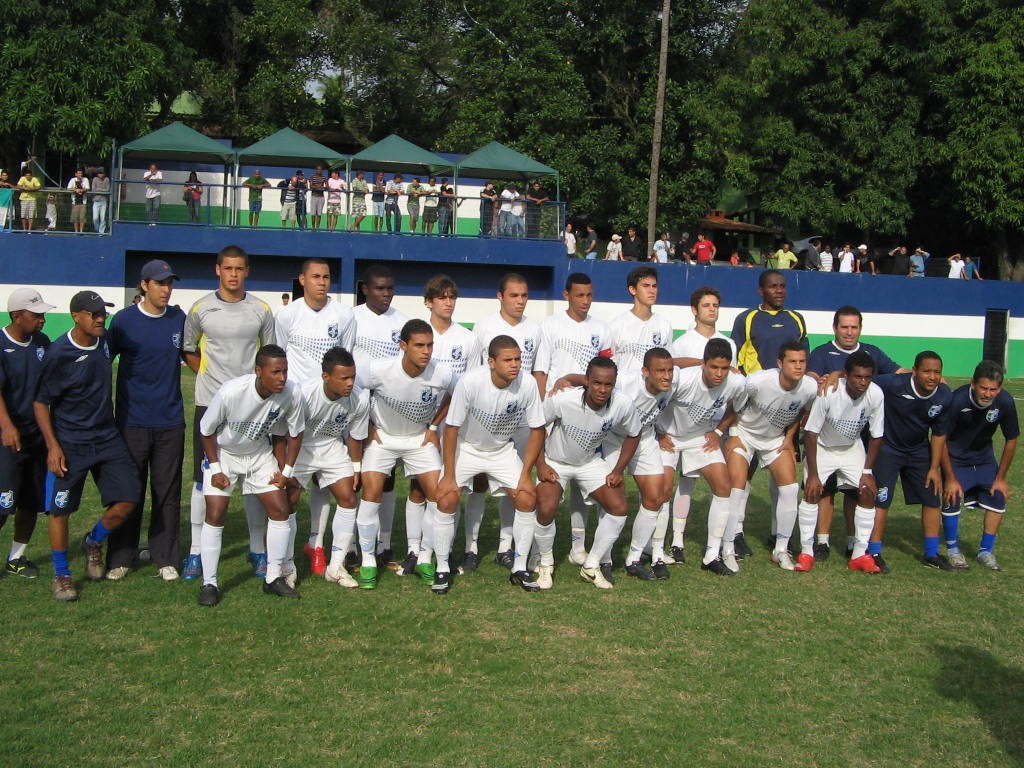
Team photo from the 2009 season

Univassouras Artsul FC, formally known as Artsul FC, is a Brazilian football team from the city of Nova Iguaçu in the state of Rio de Janeiro, founded on 26 August 2025.

== Artsul FC (2001-2025) ==
Artsul FC (founded on 19 June 2001) was part of the Grupo Artsul, a company specialising in concrete.

The club made its professional debut in 2002, when it competed in the Third Division of the Campeonato Carioca, finishing as runner-up in the competition.

Alemão, who played between 2004 and 2007 for the first division clubs Coritiba FC and SE Palmeiras as well as in Japan and Francisco Anderson Huaiquipán, are probably the best known players that came from the ranks of the club.

In 2024, Artsul FC competed in the Campeonato Carioca Série A2, in which it finished the competition being relegated, playing in the third division in the same year. Artsul became champion of the Taça Corcovado, the first round of the state Campeonato Carioca Série B1, by beating EC São Gonçalo in the last round by 1-0. The club were qualified for the semifinals of the state championship, aiming for the title and its promotion. In the semifinals, Artsul was eliminated by Pérolas Negras, finishing the competition as a semifinalist and remaining in the third division of the state.

== From Artsul FC to Univassouras Artsul FC ==
On 26th August 2025, Artsul FC officially partnered with University of Vassouras, a private university from Vassouras. The club goal is to unite sports and education.

== Stadium ==
The home stadium is Estádio Nivaldo Pereira named after the club founder.

== Colors ==
The official colors are blue, green and white until the re-branding. Now its colours are Burgundy and Grey, based on the colors of the university

== Honours ==
- Taça Corcovado
  - Winners (1): 2024
