= 2009 São Paulo FC season =

São Paulo
2009 season
- Chairman: Juvenal Juvêncio
- Manager: Muricy Ramalho (until 19 June); Milton Cruz (caretaker manager); Ricardo Gomes
- Série A: 3rd
- Campeonato Paulista: Semi-finals
- Copa Libertadores: Quarter-finals
- Top goalscorer: League: Washington (17 goals); All: Washington (32 goals)
- Highest home attendance: 53,204 ( v Vitória in the Série A)
- Lowest home attendance: 3,935 ( v Bragantino in the Paulistão)

The 2009 season was São Paulo's 80th season since club's existence. For the third year consecutive Tricolor fall in semifinals of Campeonato Paulista, this time losing to rival Corinthians. In Copa Libertadores was defeated in quarterfinals by Cruzeiro after two losses 1–2 (away), 0–2 (home). At the league, the club broke the triumph's sequence of the three previous titles. Ending in the 3rd position took a place in Copa Libertadores. After three and a half, the coach Muricy Ramalho was fired by the fourth consecutive elimination in Libertadores.

== Club ==
=== Coaching staff ===
| Position | Staff |
|---|---|
| Manager | (Brazil) Ricardo Gomes |
| Assistant managers | (Brazil) Milton Cruz |
| Goalkeeping coach | (Brazil) Haroldo Lamounier |
| First team fitness coach | (Brazil) Carlinhos Neves |
| Club doctor | (Brazil) José Sanches |

Last updated: 19 June
Source: São Paulo FC

=== Other information ===
| Chairman | (Brazil) Juvenal Juvêncio |
| Ground (capacity and dimensions) | Morumbi (73,501 / 108x72 meters) |

Updated to match played 13 December
Source: São Paulo FC

== Squad ==
As of 20 August 2009 Note: Flags indicate national team as defined under FIFA eligibility rules; some limited exceptions apply. Players may hold more than one non-FIFA nationality.

| No. | Pos. | Nation | Player |
|---|---|---|---|
| 01 | GK | BRA | Rogério Ceni (captain) |
| 2 | DF | BRA | Wagner Diniz |
| 3 | DF | BRA | André Dias (vice-captain) |
| 4 | DF | BRA | Rodrigo (on loan from Dynamo Kyiv) |
| 5 | DF | BRA | Miranda |
| 6 | DF | BRA | Júnior César |
| 7 | MF | BRA | Jorge Wagner |
| 8 | MF | BRA | Eduardo Costa |
| 9 | FW | BRA | Washington |
| 10 | MF | BRA | Hernanes |
| 11 | MF | BRA | Arouca |
| 12 | MF | BRA | Joílson |
| 12 | GK | BRA | Denis |
| 13 | DF | BRA | Jean Rolt |
| 14 | DF | BRA | Renato Silva |
| 15 | MF | BRA | Jean |
| 16 | MF | BRA | Marlos |
| 17 | FW | BRA | Borges |

| No. | Pos. | Nation | Player |
|---|---|---|---|
| 18 | MF | BRA | Hugo |
| 19 | FW | BRA | André Lima |
| 20 | MF | BRA | Richarlyson |
| 21 | DF | ARG | Adrián González |
| 22 | GK | BRA | Bosco |
| 23 | MF | BRA | Zé Luís |
| 25 | FW | BRA | Dagoberto |
| 26 | MF | BRA | Sergio Mota |
| 28 | MF | BRA | Wellington |
| 29 | FW | BRA | Henrique |
| 30 | MF | BRA | Oscar |
| 31 | DF | BRA | Aislan |
| 32 | DF | BRA | Diogo |
| 33 | DF | CHI | Nélson Saavedra (on loan from Palestino) |
| 37 | FW | BRA | Mazola |
| 40 | GK | BRA | Fabiano |
| 50 | GK | BRA | Leonardo |

== Transfers ==
=== Out on loan ===
Note: Flags indicate national team as defined under FIFA eligibility rules; some limited exceptions apply. Players may hold more than one non-FIFA nationality.

| No. | Pos. | Nation | Player |
|---|---|---|---|
| — | DF | BRA | Alex Bruno (to Atlético Mineiro) |
| — | FW | BRA | Roger (to Vitória) |
| — | MF | BRA | Renan (to Atlético Mineiro) |
| 2 | DF | BRA | Wagner Diniz (to Santos) |

=== In ===
Note: Flags indicate national team as defined under FIFA eligibility rules; some limited exceptions apply. Players may hold more than one non-FIFA nationality.

| No. | Pos. | Nation | Player |
|---|---|---|---|
| — | DF | BRA | André (return from São Caetano) |
| — | MF | BRA | Alê (return from Cerezo Osaka) |
| — | DF | BRA | Alex Cazumba (return from Figueirense) |
| — | MF | BRA | Francisco Alex (return from Sport Recife) |
| — | MF | BRA | Rafinha (return from São Caetano) |
| — | DF | BRA | Wagner Diniz (from Vasco da Gama) |
| — | MF | BRA | Eduardo Costa (from Espanyol) |
| — | DF | BRA | Renato Silva (from Botafogo) |
| — | FW | BRA | Washington (from Fluminense) |
| — | DF | BRA | Júnior César (from Fluminense) |
| — | DF | BRA | Arouca (from Fluminense) |
| — | GK | BRA | Denis (from Ponte Preta) |
| — | MF | BRA | Marlos (from Coritiba) |
| — | DF | BRA | Jean Rolt (from Ponte Preta) |
| — | DF | CHI | Nélson Saavedra (from Palestino) |
| — | DF | ARG | Adrián González (from San Lorenzo) |

=== Out ===
Note: Flags indicate national team as defined under FIFA eligibility rules; some limited exceptions apply. Players may hold more than one non-FIFA nationality.

| No. | Pos. | Nation | Player |
|---|---|---|---|
| 9 | FW | BRA | Éder Luís (return to Atlético Mineiro) |
| 6 | DF | BRA | Júnior (end of contract) |
| 16 | DF | BRA | Jancarlos (end of contract) |
| 2 | DF | BRA | Juninho (to Botafogo) |
| — | DF | BRA | Jadílson (to Grêmio) |
| 13 | DF | BRA | Anderson (to Cruzeiro) |
| 12 | DF | BRA | Joílson (to Grêmio) |
| 19 | FW | BRA | André Lima (return to Hertha Berlin) |
| 8 | MF | BRA | Eduardo Costa (to AS Monaco) |
| 13 | DF | BRA | Jean Rolt (return to Ponte Preta) |

== Statistics ==
=== Appearances and goals ===
| No. | Pos | Nat | Player | Total | | Campeonato Paulista | | Copa Libertadores | | Campeonato Brasileiro | |
| No. | Pos | Nat | Player | Apps | Goals | Apps | Goals | Apps | Goals | Apps | Goals |
|---|---|---|---|---|---|---|---|---|---|---|---|
| 1 | GK | (Brazil) BRA | Rogério Ceni | 35 | -36 | 16+0 | -15 | 3+0 | -2 | 16+0 | -19 |
| 2 | DF | (Brazil) BRA | Wagner Diniz | 7 | 1 | 3+2 | 0 | 1+0 | 0 | 0+1 | 1 |
| 3 | DF | (Brazil) BRA | André Dias | 50 | 3 | 16+0 | 2 | 5+0 | 0 | 29+0 | 1 |
| 4 | DF | (Brazil) BRA | Rodrigo | 28 | 2 | 14+2 | 2 | 3+0 | 0 | 8+1 | 0 |
| 5 | DF | (Brazil) BRA | Miranda | 49 | 1 | 15+0 | 1 | 6+0 | 0 | 28+0 | 0 |
| 6 | DF | (Brazil) BRA | Júnior César | 57 | 0 | 13+3 | 0 | 5+0 | 0 | 30+6 | 0 |
| 7 | MF | (Brazil) BRA | Jorge Wagner | 57 | 10 | 17+1 | 3 | 6+0 | 0 | 29+4 | 7 |
| 8 | MF | (Brazil) BRA | Eduardo Costa | 18 | 0 | 1+1 | 0 | 3+0 | 0 | 10+3 | 0 |
| 9 | FW | (Brazil) BRA | Washington | 58 | 32 | 18+0 | 12 | 7+0 | 3 | 28+5 | 17 |
| 10 | MF | (Brazil) BRA | Hernanes | 58 | 10 | 17+2 | 4 | 6+1 | 0 | 30+2 | 6 |
| 11 | MF | (Brazil) BRA | Arouca | 41 | 0 | 10+7 | 0 | 2+1 | 0 | 13+8 | 0 |
| 12 | GK | (Brazil) BRA | Denis | 20 | -21 | 0+1 | 0 | 2+0 | -4 | 15+2 | -17 |
| 12 | DF | (Brazil) BRA | Joílson | 5 | 0 | 3+2 | 0 | 0+0 | 0 | 0+0 | 0 |
| 13 | DF | (Brazil) BRA | Jean Rolt | 6 | 1 | 0+0 | 0 | 0+0 | 0 | 6+0 | 1 |
| 14 | DF | (Brazil) BRA | Renato Silva | 53 | 1 | 12+4 | 1 | 7+0 | 0 | 29+1 | 0 |
| 15 | MF | (Brazil) BRA | Jean | 58 | 2 | 20+0 | 0 | 8+0 | 0 | 30+0 | 2 |
| 16 | MF | (Brazil) BRA | Marlos | 28 | 1 | 0+0 | 0 | 1+0 | 0 | 14+13 | 1 |
| 17 | FW | (Brazil) BRA | Borges | 54 | 15 | 13+2 | 4 | 6+1 | 5 | 18+14 | 6 |
| 18 | MF | (Brazil) BRA | Hugo | 43 | 5 | 12+4 | 1 | 3+0 | 0 | 13+11 | 4 |
| 19 | FW | (Brazil) BRA | André Lima | 11 | 3 | 3+3 | 1 | 1+2 | 1 | 0+2 | 1 |
| 20 | MF | (Brazil) BRA | Richarlyson | 43 | 2 | 7+5 | 0 | 3+1 | 0 | 25+2 | 2 |
| 21 | DF | (Argentina) ARG | Adrián González | 7 | 0 | 0+0 | 0 | 0+0 | 0 | 6+1 | 0 |
| 22 | GK | (Brazil) BRA | Bosco | 17 | -17 | 6+1 | -6 | 3+0 | -4 | 7+0 | -7 |
| 23 | DF | (Brazil) BRA | Zé Luís | 39 | 0 | 13+2 | 0 | 5+0 | 0 | 10+9 | 0 |
| 25 | FW | (Brazil) BRA | Dagoberto | 55 | 10 | 11+6 | 1 | 3+4 | 2 | 27+4 | 7 |
| 26 | MF | (Brazil) BRA | Sergio Mota | 0 | 0 | 0+0 | 0 | 0+0 | 0 | 0+0 | 0 |
| 28 | MF | (Brazil) BRA | Wellington | 9 | 0 | 0+2 | 0 | 0+1 | 0 | 0+6 | 0 |
| 29 | FW | (Brazil) BRA | Henrique | 3 | 0 | 0+2 | 0 | 0+0 | 0 | 0+1 | 0 |
| 30 | MF | (Brazil) BRA | Oscar | 13 | 0 | 0+1 | 0 | 0+1 | 0 | 0+11 | 0 |
| 31 | DF | (Brazil) BRA | Aislan | 5 | 0 | 1+1 | 0 | 2+1 | 0 | 0+0 | 0 |
| 32 | DF | (Brazil) BRA | Diogo | 0 | 0 | 0+0 | 0 | 0+0 | 0 | 0+0 | 0 |
| 33 | DF | (Chile) CHI | Nélson Saavedra | 0 | 0 | 0+0 | 0 | 0+0 | 0 | 0+0 | 0 |
| 40 | GK | (Brazil) BRA | Fabiano | 0 | 0 | 0+0 | 0 | 0+0 | 0 | 0+0 | 0 |
| 50 | GK | (Brazil) BRA | Leonardo | 0 | 0 | 0+0 | 0 | 0+0 | 0 | 0+0 | 0 |

=== Top scorers ===
Includes all competitive matches

| Position | Nation | Number | Name | Campeonato Paulista | Copa Libertadores | Campeonato Brasileiro | Total |
|---|---|---|---|---|---|---|---|
| 1 | (Brazil) | 9 | Washington | 12 | 3 | 17 | 32 |
| 2 | (Brazil) | 17 | Borges | 4 | 5 | 6 | 15 |
| 3 | (Brazil) | 7 | Jorge Wagner | 3 | 0 | 7 | 10 |
| = | (Brazil) | 10 | Hernanes | 4 | 0 | 6 | 10 |
| = | (Brazil) | 25 | Dagoberto | 1 | 2 | 7 | 10 |
| 6 | (Brazil) | 18 | Hugo | 1 | 0 | 4 | 5 |
| 7 | (Brazil) | 3 | André Dias | 2 | 0 | 1 | 3 |
| = | (Brazil) | 19 | André Lima | 1 | 1 | 1 | 3 |
| 9 | (Brazil) | 1 | Rogério Ceni | 0 | 0 | 2 | 2 |
| = | (Brazil) | 9 | Rodrigo | 2 | 0 | 0 | 2 |
| = | (Brazil) | 15 | Jean | 0 | 0 | 2 | 2 |
| = | (Brazil) | 20 | Richarlyson | 0 | 0 | 2 | 2 |
| 13 | (Brazil) | 5 | Miranda | 1 | 0 | 0 | 1 |
| = | (Brazil) | 13 | Jean Rolt | 0 | 0 | 1 | 1 |
| = | (Brazil) | 14 | Renato Silva | 1 | 0 | 0 | 1 |
| = | (Brazil) | 16 | Marlos | 0 | 0 | 1 | 1 |
| | | | Total | 34 | 11 | 57 | 102 |

=== Disciplinary record ===
| Position | Nation | Number | Name | Campeonato Paulista | | Copa Libertadores | | Campeonato Brasileiro | | Total | |
| Position | Nation | Number | Name | Booked | Sent off (straight red) | Booked | Sent off (straight red) | Booked | Sent off (straight red) | Booked | Sent off (straight red) |
| GK | (Brazil) | 1 | Rogério Ceni | 0 | 0 | 1 | 0 | 1 | 1 | 2 | 1 |
| DF | (Brazil) | 2 | Wagner Diniz | 1 | 1 | 0 | 0 | 0 | 0 | 1 | 1 |
| DF | (Brazil) | 3 | André Dias | 8 | 0 | 3 | 1 | 9 | 1 | 20 | 2 |
| DF | (Brazil) | 4 | Rodrigo | 6 | 0 | 1 | 0 | 0 | 0 | 7 | 0 |
| DF | (Brazil) | 5 | Miranda | 3 | 1 | 2 | 0 | 9 | 1 | 14 | 2 |
| DF | (Brazil) | 6 | Júnior César | 5 | 0 | 1 | 0 | 5 | 1 | 11 | 1 |
| MF | (Brazil) | 7 | Jorge Wagner | 4 | 0 | 1 | 0 | 10 | 0 | 15 | 0 |
| MF | (Brazil) | 8 | Eduardo Costa | 0 | 0 | 2 | 1 | 3 | 0 | 5 | 1 |
| FW | (Brazil) | 9 | Washington | 6 | 0 | 3 | 0 | 4 | 2 | 13 | 2 |
| MF | (Brazil) | 10 | Hernanes | 4 | 1 | 0 | 0 | 3 | 0 | 7 | 1 |
| MF | (Brazil) | 11 | Arouca | 0 | 0 | 0 | 0 | 2 | 0 | 2 | 0 |
| DF | (Brazil) | 12 | Joílson | 1 | 0 | 0 | 0 | 0 | 0 | 1 | 0 |
| DF | (Brazil) | 13 | Jean Rolt | 0 | 0 | 0 | 0 | 1 | 0 | 1 | 0 |
| DF | (Brazil) | 14 | Renato Silva | 3 | 0 | 2 | 0 | 7 | 3 | 12 | 3 |
| MF | (Brazil) | 15 | Jean | 2 | 0 | 0 | 0 | 5 | 1 | 7 | 1 |
| MF | (Brazil) | 16 | Marlos | 0 | 0 | 0 | 0 | 2 | 0 | 2 | 0 |
| FW | (Brazil) | 17 | Borges | 3 | 0 | 2 | 0 | 6 | 1 | 11 | 1 |
| MF | (Brazil) | 18 | Hugo | 3 | 0 | 1 | 0 | 5 | 0 | 9 | 0 |
| FW | (Brazil) | 19 | André Lima | 2 | 0 | 0 | 0 | 0 | 0 | 2 | 0 |
| MF | (Brazil) | 20 | Richarlyson | 2 | 0 | 1 | 0 | 11 | 3 | 14 | 3 |
| DF | (Argentina) | 21 | Adrián González | 0 | 0 | 0 | 0 | 2 | 0 | 2 | 0 |
| GK | (Brazil) | 22 | Bosco | 0 | 0 | 0 | 0 | 1 | 0 | 1 | 0 |
| DF | (Brazil) | 23 | Zé Luís | 1 | 0 | 2 | 0 | 5 | 0 | 8 | 0 |
| FW | (Brazil) | 25 | Dagoberto | 7 | 1 | 3 | 0 | 10 | 1 | 20 | 2 |
| MF | (Brazil) | 28 | Wellington | 0 | 0 | 0 | 0 | 2 | 0 | 2 | 0 |
| | | | Total | 60 | 5 | 25 | 2 | 101 | 15 | 186 | 22 |

=== Managers performance ===
| Name | Nationality | From | To | P | W | D | L | GF | GA | Win% |
|---|---|---|---|---|---|---|---|---|---|---|
| Muricy Ramalho | Brazil | 21 January | 17 June | 35 | 17 | 9 | 9 | 51 | 35 | 57% |
| Milton Cruz | Brazil | 21 June | 21 June | 1 | 0 | 0 | 1 | 1 | 3 | 0% |
| Ricardo Gomes | Brazil | 28 June | 6 December | 31 | 17 | 7 | 7 | 50 | 34 | 62% |

=== Overall ===
| Games played | 67 (21 Campeonato Paulista, 8 Copa Libertadores, 38 Campeonato Brasileiro) |
| Games won | 34 (12 Campeonato Paulista, 4 Copa Libertadores, 18 Campeonato Brasileiro) |
| Games drawn | 16 (4 Campeonato Paulista, 1 Copa Libertadores, 11 Campeonato Brasileiro) |
| Games lost | 17 (5 Campeonato Paulista, 3 Copa Libertadores, 9 Campeonato Brasileiro) |
| Goals scored | 102 |
| Goals conceded | 72 |
| Goal difference | +30 |
| Yellow cards | 186 |
| Red cards | 22 |
| Worst discipline | Richarlyson (14 (yellow card) , 3 (red card) ) |
| Best result | 5–0 (H) v Mirassol – Paulistão – 2009.3.12 |
| Worst result | 3–1 (A) v Corinthians – Série A – 2009.6.21 |
| Most appearances | Hernanes, Jean, Washington (58 appearances) |
| Top scorer | Washington (32 goals) |

Last updated: 8 December
Source: São Paulo FC

== Official competitions ==
=== Campeonato Paulista ===
| 21 January Round 1 | São Paulo | 1–1 | Ituano | São Paulo |
| 19:30 UTC−03:00 | Hugo 12'; Borges (yellow card) 35' | (Report) | Miranda 36' (o.g.); Ricardo Xavier (yellow card) 35'; Érick (yellow card) 90+2' | Stadium: Morumbi; Attendance: 11,402; Referee: Robério Pereira Pires |

| 25 January Round 2 | Portuguesa | 0–2 | São Paulo | São Paulo |
| 17:00 UTC−03:00 | Ediglê (yellow card) 21'; Raí (yellow card) 37' | (Report) | Washington 1' 77'; André Dias (yellow card) 42'; Hugo (yellow card) 47' | Stadium: Canindé; Attendance: 7,562; Referee: Paulo César de Oliveira |

| 28 January Round 3 | Guarani | 0–2 | São Paulo | Campinas |
| 22:00 UTC−03:00 | | (Report) | Hernanes (yellow card) 25' (goal) 88'; Hugo (yellow card) 56'; Plínio 67' (o.g.); André Dias (yellow card) 88' | Stadium: Brinco de Ouro; Attendance: 15,712; Referee: Luiz Flávio de Oliveira |

| 1 February Round 4 | São Paulo | 0–2 | Santo André | São Paulo |
| 17:00 UTC−03:00 | Washington (yellow card) 12'; Dagoberto (yellow card) 18'; Miranda (yellow card) 52' (yellow-red card) 58' | (Report) | Osny 6'; Élvis (yellow card) 12'; Junior Dutra 54'; Marcelinho Carioca (yellow card) 77'; Marcel (yellow card) 87' | Stadium: Morumbi; Attendance: 14,253; Referee: Cléber Wellington Abade |

| 4 February Round 5 | São Paulo | 2–1 | Bragantino | São Paulo |
| 22:00 UTC−03:00 | Washington (yellow card) 14' (goal) 25'; André Dias 58'; Richarlyson (yellow card) 70'; Renato Silva (yellow card) 78'; Jorge Wagner (yellow card) 85' | (Report) | Cris (yellow card) 6'; Marcelo Godri 13'; Malaquias (yellow card) 32'; Nunes (yellow card) 35'; Gabriel (yellow card) 86' | Stadium: Morumbi; Attendance: 3,935; Referee: José Henrique de Carvalho |

| 8 February Round 6 | Botafogo | 1–2 | São Paulo | Ribeirão Preto |
| 17:00 UTC−03:00 | Éverton Luis (yellow card) 34'; Branquinho 52'; Jonílson (yellow card) 68' | (Report) | Hernanes 28' (yellow card) 79' (yellow-red card) 90+3'; André Dias (yellow card) 42'; Washington 60'; Jean (yellow card) 65' | Stadium: Santa Cruz; Referee: Paulo Roberto Ferreira |

| 12 February Round 7 | São Paulo | 2–1 | Ponte Preta | São Paulo |
| 21:45 UTC−03:00 | Hugo (yellow card) 16'; Rodrigo 33' (yellow card) 75'; Jean (yellow card) 62'; Jorge Wagner 63' | (Report) | Marcio Mixirica 85'; Leandro Costa (yellow card) 90+1' | Stadium: Morumbi; Attendance: 5,609; Referee: Phillipe Lombard |

| 15 February Round 8 | São Paulo | 1–1 | Corinthians | São Paulo |
| 16:00 UTC−03:00 | Borges (yellow card) 57' (goal) 75'; Wagner Diniz (yellow card) 59' (yellow-red card) 73'; Renato Silva (yellow card) 71'; Richarlyson (yellow card) 85'; Dagoberto (yellow card) 85'; Júnior César (yellow card) 45+2' | (Report) | Morais (yellow card) 37'; Túlio (red card) 38'; Jorge Henrique (yellow card) 39'; André Santos (yellow card) 47' (yellow-red card) 86' (goal) 81'; Escudero (yellow card) 62' | Stadium: Morumbi; Attendance: 33,991; Referee: José Henrique de Carvalho |

| 21 February Round 9 | Barueri | 1–3 | São Paulo | Barueri |
| 18:30 UTC−03:00 | Everton 49'; Flávio (yellow card) 21' | (Report) | Dagoberto (yellow card) 26'; Joílson (yellow card) 48'; Borges 59' 66'; Diego 64' (o.g.) | Stadium: Barueri; Attendance: 5,570; Referee: Paulo César de Oliveira |

| 26 February Round 10 | São Paulo | 3–0 | Oeste | São Paulo |
| 21:45 UTC−03:00 | Washington 36'; Borges (yellow card) 47'; André Dias 72'; Hernanes 88' | (Report) | Dedê (yellow card) 47'; Vander (yellow card) 70' | Stadium: Morumbi; Attendance: 4,791; Referee: Robério Pereira Pires |

| 1 March Round 11 | Santos | 1–0 | São Paulo | Santos |
| 16:00 UTC−03:00 | Fabiano Eller (yellow card) 18'; Molina (yellow card) 24' (goal) 40'; Domingos (yellow card) 32'; Fabão (yellow card) 46'; Roberto Brum (yellow card) 85' | (Report) | Dagoberto (yellow card) 11'; Washington (yellow card) 22' | Stadium: Vila Belmiro; Attendance: 9,929; Referee: Wilson Luiz Seneme |

| 8 March Round 12 | Mogi Mirim | 2–0 | São Paulo | Mogi Mirim |
| 19:10 UTC−03:00 | Marcelo Régis 16' 19'; Vela (yellow card) 32'; Joelson (yellow card) 39'; Willian Alves (yellow card) 50' | (Report) | Dagoberto (red card) 73'; André Lima (yellow card) 89' | Stadium: Papa João Paulo II; Attendance: 5,436; Referee: Milton Etsuo Ballerin |

| 12 March Round 13 | São Paulo | 5–0 | Mirassol | São Paulo |
| 21:45 UTC−03:00 | Borges 38'; Washington 43' 75' 80'; Júnior César (yellow card) 57'; Jorge Wagner 59' | (Report) | Rodriguinho (yellow card) 41'; Deleu (yellow card) 48' (yellow-red card) 52' | Stadium: Morumbi; Attendance: 5,037; Referee: Rodrigo Guarizo Ferreira do Amaral |

| 15 March Round 14 | São Paulo | 2–1 | Marília | São Paulo |
| 18:10 UTC−03:00 | Hernanes 24' (yellow card) 43'; Júnior César (yellow card) 37'; Washington 58' | (Report) | Flávio (yellow card) 69'; João Vítor 70'; Adílio 78' | Stadium: Morumbi; Attendance: 9,626; Referee: Carlos Roberto dos Santos Junior |

| 22 March Round 15 | Paulista | 1–1 | São Paulo | Jundiaí |
| 16:00 UTC−03:00 | Ramalho (yellow card) 50'; Zé Carlos 56'; Enílton (yellow card) 85' | (Report) | Miranda (yellow card) 23'; Rodrigo 51'; Renato Silva (yellow card) 64' | Stadium: Jayme Cintra; Attendance: 4,528; Referee: Marcelo Rogério |

| 25 March Round 16 | Noroeste | 1–2 | São Paulo | Bauru |
| 20:30 UTC−03:00 | Gilsinho (yellow card) 53'; Marcelinho 65'; Bilu (yellow card) 87' | (Report) | André Dias (yellow card) 23'; Washington 50' (yellow card) 67'; Jorge Wagner 63'; Rodrigo (yellow card) 74' | Stadium: Alfredo de Castilho; Referee: Leonardo Ferreira Lima |

| 28 March Round 17 | São Paulo | 1–0 | Palmeiras | São Paulo |
| 16:00 UTC−03:00 | Washington 2'; Júnior César (yellow card) 8'; Dagoberto (yellow card) 11'; André Dias (yellow card) 42'; Jorge Wagner (yellow card) 53' | (Report) | Marquinhos (yellow card) 5'; Cleiton Xavier (yellow card) 17'; Evandro (yellow card) 46' | Stadium: Morumbi; Attendance: 18,289; Referee: Wilson Luiz Seneme |

| 31 March Round 18 | São Paulo | 2–1 | Guaratinguetá | São Paulo |
| 20:30 UTC−03:00 | André Dias (yellow card) 33'; Dagoberto 42'; Washington (yellow card) 46' (goal) 53'; Jorge Wagner (yellow card) 56'; Rodrigo (yellow card) 63'; Hernanes (yellow card) 71' | (Report) | Renato (yellow card) 14'; Nenê 46' (pen.); Nino (yellow card) 77' | Stadium: Morumbi; Attendance: 12,995; Referee: Cléber Wellington Abade |

| 5 April Round 19 | São Caetano | 2–2 | São Paulo | São Caetano do Sul |
| 16:00 UTC−03:00 | Luan 37'; Everaldo (yellow card) 41'; Marcelo Batatais 90+4' | (Report) | André Lima 16'; Renato Silva 42'; Zé Luis (yellow card) 78' | Stadium: Anacleto Campanella; Referee: Flávio Rodrigues Guerra |

| 12 April Semifinals | Corinthians | 2–1 | São Paulo | São Paulo |
| 16:00 UTC−03:00 | Ronaldo (yellow card) 7'; Elias 29'; Dentinho (yellow card) 51'; William (yellow card) 73'; Cristian 90+3' | (Report) | Rodrigo (yellow card) 10'; Miranda 26' (yellow card) 49'; André Dias (yellow card) 36' (yellow-red card) 55'; Borges (yellow card) 81' | Stadium: Pacaembu; Attendance: 30,838; Referee: Salvio Spinola Fagundes Filho |

| 19 April Semifinals | São Paulo | 0–2 (1–4 agg.) | Corinthians | São Paulo |
| 16:00 UTC−03:00 | Rodrigo (yellow card) 14' (yellow-red card) 83'; Washington (yellow card) 20'; Dagoberto (yellow card) 65' | (Report) | André Santos (yellow card) 10'; Cristian (yellow card) 26'; Douglas 56'; Ronaldo 58'; Dentinho (yellow card) 61' | Stadium: Morumbi; Attendance: 45,710; Referee: Wilson Luiz Seneme |

==== Record ====
| Final position | Points | Matches | Wins | Draws | Losses | Goals for | Goals against | Win% |
|---|---|---|---|---|---|---|---|---|
| 4th | 40 | 21 | 12 | 4 | 5 | 34 | 21 | 63% |

=== Copa Libertadores ===
| 18 February Second Stage | São Paulo (Brazil) | 1–1 | (Colombia) Independiente Medellín | São Paulo |
| 21:50 UTC−03:00 | Renato Silva (yellow card) 59'; Borges (yellow card) 62' (goal) 90+3'; André Dias (yellow card) 77' | (Report) | Jackson Martínez (yellow card) 60'; Juan Ortiz (yellow card) 62'; Rafael Castillo (yellow card) 73'; Arias 79' | Stadium: Estádio Cícero Pompeu de Toledo (Morumbi); Attendance: 30,375; Referee: Sergio Pezzota (Argentina) |

| 5 March Second Stage | América de Cali (Colombia) | 1–3 | (Brazil) São Paulo | Cali |
| 21:30 UTC−05:00 | Mesa (yellow card) 29'; Viafara (yellow card) 29'; Cortés 84'; Velez (yellow card) 86' | (Report) | Washington 2' 27'; Miranda (yellow card) 15'; Borges 49'; Zé Luís (yellow card) 76'; Renato Silva (yellow card) 86' | Stadium: Estadio Olímpico Pascual Guerrero; Attendance: 15,116; Referee: Héctor Baldassi (Argentina) |

| 18 March Second Stage | Defensor Sporting (Uruguay) | 0–1 | (Brazil) São Paulo | Montevideo |
| 21:50 UTC−03:00 | Rodrigo Mora (yellow card) 35' | (Report) | Washington (yellow card) 2'; Borges 39'; Rodrigo (yellow card) 45'; Júnior César (yellow card) 65'; Jorge Wagner (yellow card) 76'; Rogério Ceni (yellow card) 90+1' | Stadium: Estadio Luis Franzini; Attendance: 19,339; Referee: Carlos Amarilla (Argentina) |

| 9 April Second Stage | São Paulo (Brazil) | 2–1 | (Uruguay) Defensor Sporting | São Paulo |
| 19:15 UTC−03:00 | Washington (yellow card) 45'; André Dias (yellow card) 61'; Borges 70' 75'; Dagoberto (yellow card) 76' | (Report) | Diego de Souza 38' (yellow card) 55' (yellow-red card) 90'; Jorge Curbelo (yellow card) 53' | Stadium: Estádio Cícero Pompeu de Toledo (Morumbi); Attendance: 47,205; Referee: Carlos Chandía (Chile) |

| 15 April Second Stage | Independiente Medellín (Colombia) | 2–1 | (Brazil) São Paulo | Medellín |
| 19:50 UTC−05:00 | Cañas (yellow card) 13'; Cabrera 15'; Castillo 27' (yellow card) 64'; Ortiz (yellow card) 35'; Restrepo (yellow card) 58'; Mosquera (yellow card) 67'; Vanegas (yellow card) 80' | (Report) | Dagoberto (yellow card) 36'; André Lima 39'; Hugo (yellow card) 46'; Eduardo Costa (yellow card) 76' | Stadium: Estadio Atanasio Girardot; Referee: Carlos Vera (Ecuador) |

| 22 April Second Stage | São Paulo (Brazil) | 2–1 | (Colombia) América de Cali | São Paulo |
| 21:50 UTC−03:00 | Washington (yellow card) 9'; Dagoberto 57' 67' | (Report) | Parra 8'; Valdés (yellow card) 9'; Banguero (yellow card) 35'; Arango (yellow card) 40' | Stadium: Estádio Cícero Pompeu de Toledo (Morumbi); Attendance: 23,221; Referee: Carlos Torres (Argentina) |

| 6 May Round of 16 | Guadalajara (Mexico) | (cancelled) | (Brazil) São Paulo | Mexico City |
| 01:10 | | | | Stadium: Estadio Jalisco |

| 13 May Round of 16 | São Paulo (Brazil) | (cancelled) | (Mexico) Guadalajara | São Paulo |
| 21:50 UTC−03:00 | | | | Stadium: Estádio Cícero Pompeu de Toledo (Morumbi) |

| 27 May Quarterfinals | Cruzeiro (Brazil) | 2–1 | (Brazil) São Paulo | Belo Horizonte |
| 21:50 UTC−03:00 | Kléber (yellow card) 20'; Leonardo Silva 45'; Zé Carlos 65' | (Report) | Dagoberto (yellow card) 30'; Richarlyson (yellow card) 31'; Washington 57'; Miranda (yellow card) 77'; Zé Luís (yellow card) 80' | Stadium: Estádio Governador Magalhães Pinto (Mineirão); Attendance: 52,906; Referee: Carlos Chandía (Chile) |

| 17 June Quarterfinals | São Paulo (Brazil) | 0–2 (1–4 agg.) | (Brazil) Cruzeiro | São Paulo |
| 21:50 UTC−03:00 | Eduardo Costa (yellow card) 30' (yellow-red card) 42'; André Dias (yellow card) 56' (yellow-red card) 79'; Borges (yellow card) 87' | (Report) | Fábio (yellow card) 39'; Wagner (yellow card) 47'; Kléber (yellow card) 59'; Jonathan (yellow card) 60'; Gérson Magrão (yellow card) 84' | Stadium: Estádio Cícero Pompeu de Toledo (Morumbi); Attendance: 52,809; Referee: Sérgio Pezzota (Argentina) |

==== Record ====
| Final position | Points | Matches | Wins | Draws | Losses | Goals for | Goals against | Win% |
|---|---|---|---|---|---|---|---|---|
| 7th | 13 | 8 | 4 | 1 | 3 | 11 | 10 | 54% |

=== Campeonato Brasileiro ===
| 10 May Round 1 | Fluminense | 1–0 | São Paulo | Rio de Janeiro |
| 16:00 UTC−03:00 | Maurício 2'; Luiz Alberto (yellow card) 10'; Fernando Henrique (yellow card) 57' | (Report) | Richarlyson (yellow card) 16'; Jorge Wagner (yellow card) 23'; Hugo (yellow card) 45'; Wellington (yellow card) 83' | Stadium: Maracanã; Attendance: 14,574; Referee: Sandro Meira Ricci |

| 17 May Round 2 | São Paulo | 2–2 | Atlético Paranaense | São Paulo |
| 16:00 UTC−03:00 | Borges 46'; Washington (yellow card) 53'; Eduardo Costa (yellow card) 60'; André Lima 89'; Júnior César (yellow card) 90' | (Report) | Rafael Santos (yellow card) 35' (goal) 45' 74'; Raul (yellow card) 43'; Marcinho (yellow card) 80' | Stadium: Morumbi; Attendance: 11,554; Referee: Wilton Pereira Sampaio |

| 24 May Round 3 | Palmeiras | 0–0 | São Paulo | São Paulo |
| 16:00 UTC−03:00 | Jumar (yellow card) 34'; Maurício Ramos (yellow card) 44' (yellow-red card) 75' | (Report) | Zé Luís (yellow card) 17'; Richarlyson (red card) 90+2' | Stadium: Palestra Itália; Attendance: 12,000; Referee: Rodrigo Braghetto |

| 31 May Round 4 | São Paulo | 3–0 | Cruzeiro | São Paulo |
| 16:00 UTC−03:00 | Washington 12'; Borges 31'; Miranda (yellow card) 48'; Zé Luís (yellow card) 67'; Dagoberto 78' (yellow card) 83' | (Report) | Wellington (yellow card) 45'; Henrique (yellow card) 72' | Stadium: Morumbi; Attendance: 51,800; Referee: Evandro Rogério Ronan |

| 6 June Round 5 | Avaí | 0–0 | São Paulo | Florianópolis |
| 16:00 UTC−03:00 | Ferdinando (yellow card) 66' | (Report) | Marlos (yellow card) 28'; Dagoberto (yellow card) 56'; Zé Luís (yellow card) 65'; André Dias (yellow card) 67' | Stadium: Ressacada; Referee: Leonardo Gaciba |

| 14 June Round 6 | São Paulo | 1–1 | Santo André | São Paulo |
| 16:00 UTC−03:00 | André Dias (yellow card) 45'; Borges (yellow card) 58' (goal) 83'; Wellington (yellow card) 90' | (Report) | Marcelinho Carioca 27' (yellow card) 59'; Élvis (yellow card) 32'; Pablo Escobar (yellow card) 51'; Cesinha (yellow card) 56'; Fernando (yellow card) 56' | Stadium: Morumbi; Attendance: 8,995; Referee: Guilherme Cereta de Lima |

| 21 June Round 7 | Corinthians | 3–1 | São Paulo | São Paulo |
| 16:00 UTC−03:00 | Diego (yellow card) 23'; Cristian 36'; Jorge Henrique (yellow card) 41'; William (yellow card) 44'; Chicão 58'; Jucilei 72' | (Report) | Marlos (yellow card) 10'; Hugo (yellow card) 41'; Jean Rolt (yellow card) 47'; Richarlyson 80'; André Dias (yellow card) 88' | Stadium: Pacaembu; Attendance: 15,371; Referee: Marcelo de Lima Henrique |

| 28 June Round 8 | São Paulo | 2–0 | Náutico | São Paulo |
| 16:00 UTC−03:00 | Renato Silva (yellow card) 41'; Jean Rolt 46'; Richarlyson (yellow card) 54'; Eduardo Costa (yellow card) 62'; Hernanes 85' | (Report) | Asprilla (yellow card) 50'; Juliano (yellow card) 50'; Galiardo (yellow card) 85'; Gladstone (yellow card) 90'; Derley (yellow card) 90' | Stadium: Morumbi; Attendance: 7,977; Referee: André Luiz de Freitas Castro |

| 5 July Round 9 | Coritiba | 2–0 | São Paulo | Curitiba |
| 16:00 UTC−03:00 | Marcos Aurélio 19' (yellow card) 58'; Ariel 46'; Demerson (yellow card) 47'; Marcelinho Paraíba (yellow card) 86' | (Report) | Borges (yellow card) 18'; Dagoberto (yellow card) 65' | Stadium: Couto Pereira; Referee: Leandro Pedro Vuaden |

| 12 July Round 10 | São Paulo | 2–2 | Flamengo | São Paulo |
| 16:00 UTC−03:00 | Borges 18'; Renato Silva (yellow card) 20' (yellow-red card) 43'; Jorge Wagner 64' (yellow card) 66' | (Report) | Fierro 3' (yellow card) 24'; Adriano 21' (yellow card) 37'; Welinton (yellow card) 31'; Everton Silva (yellow card) 37'; Bruno (yellow card) 37'; Léo Moura (yellow card) 49'; Éverton (yellow card) 76'; Fabrício (yellow card) 90+3' | Stadium: Morumbi; Attendance: 21,648; Referee: Ricardo Marques Ribeiro |

| 15 July Round 11 | Atlético Mineiro | 2–0 | São Paulo | Belo Horizonte |
| 16:00 UTC−03:00 | Diego Tardelli 1' (yellow card) 46'; Serginho Mineiro (yellow card) 52' | (Report) | Jorge Wagner (yellow card) 51'; Zé Luís (yellow card) 55'; Borges (yellow card) 59' | Stadium: Mineirão; Attendance: 54,214; Referee: Leonardo Gaciba |

| 19 July Round 12 | São Paulo | 2–1 | Santos | São Paulo |
| 16:00 UTC−03:00 | Júnior César (yellow card) 23'; Dagoberto (yellow card) 31'; Washington 44' 49'; Renato Silva (yellow card) 63' | (Report) | Germano (yellow card) 29'; Roni 46'; Astorga (yellow card) 75' | Stadium: Morumbi; Attendance: 10,913; Referee: José Henrique de Carvalho |

| 22 July Round 13 | Internacional | 2–2 | São Paulo | Porto Alegre |
| 16:00 UTC−03:00 | Alecsandro 29' 37' (yellow card) 62'; Sorondo (yellow card) 46'; Sandro (yellow card) 63'; Guiñazu (yellow card) 67'; Índio (yellow card) 68' | (Report) | Hernanes 48'; Richarlyson (yellow card) 57'; Jean 68'; Júnior César (yellow card) 79' | Stadium: Beira-Rio; Referee: Rodrigo Nunes de Sá |

| 26 July Round 14 | Barueri | 1–2 | São Paulo | São Paulo |
| 18:30 UTC−03:00 | Ralf 20' (yellow card) 90' | (Report) | Washington 13' (yellow card) 61' (yellow-red card) 61'; André Dias 24'; Miranda (yellow card) 41'; Hernanes (yellow card) 90+2' | Stadium: Arena Barueri; Referee: Rodrigo Martins Cintra |

| 29 July Round 15 | São Paulo | 2–1 | Grêmio | São Paulo |
| 16:00 UTC−03:00 | Dagoberto 21' 46'; Borges (yellow card) 29'; Jorge Wagner (yellow card) 31'; Miranda (yellow card) 77' | (Report) | Tcheco 77' (pen.) | Stadium: Morumbi; Attendance: 13,323; Referee: Héber Roberto Lopes |

| 2 August Round 16 | Vitória | 0–1 | São Paulo | Salvador |
| 16:00 UTC−03:00 | Itacaré (yellow card) 38'; Anderson Martins (yellow card) 45' | (Report) | Dagoberto 73' (yellow card) 90+2'; Eduardo Costa (yellow card) 17'; Richarlyson (yellow card) 30'; Jorge Wagner (yellow card) 62' | Stadium: Barradão; Referee: Francisco Nascimento |

| 5 August Round 17 | São Paulo | 3–1 | Botafogo | São Paulo |
| 16:00 UTC−03:00 | Hugo (yellow card) 31'; Jorge Wagner 36' (pen.); Washington 45'; Dagoberto 71'; Jean (yellow card) 74' | (Report) | Lúcio Flávio 19'; Castillo (yellow card) 35'; Juninho 43' | Stadium: Morumbi; Attendance: 19,182; Referee: Elmo Alves Resende Cunha |

| 9 August Round 18 | São Paulo | 3–1 | Goiás | São Paulo |
| 18:30 UTC−03:00 | Dagoberto (yellow card) 15'; Jean (yellow card) 25'; Washington 45+1'; Jorge Wagner 78' (yellow card) 90+1'; Borges 90+4' | (Report) | Fernando (yellow card) 18'; Júlio César (yellow card) 51'; Iarley (yellow card) 66'; Rafael Toloi (red card) 76'; Bruno 86' (yellow card) 89' | Stadium: Morumbi; Attendance: 28,200; Referee: Alicio Pena Junior |

| 16 August Round 19 | Sport Recife | 1–2 | São Paulo | Recife |
| 16:00 UTC−03:00 | Wilson (red card) 81'; Fabiano 84' | (Report) | Washington 25'; Renato Silva (yellow card) 27' (yellow-red card) 84'; Miranda (yellow card) 29' (yellow-red card) 70'; Adrián González (yellow card) 52'; Hugo 90+3' | Stadium: Ilha do Retiro; Referee: Sandro Meira Ricci |

| 19 August Round 20 | São Paulo | 1–0 | Fluminense | São Paulo |
| 16:00 UTC−03:00 | André Dias (yellow card) 12'; Richarlyson 22' (yellow card) 68'; Dagoberto (yellow card) 66'; Hernanes (yellow card) 71' | (Report) | Diogo (yellow card) 14'; Ruy (yellow card) 31'; Marquinho (yellow card) 65'; Fábio Santos (yellow card) 85' | Stadium: Morumbi; Attendance: 22,072; Referee: Arilson Bispo da Anunciação |

| 23 August Round 21 | Atlético Paranaense | 1–0 | São Paulo | Curitiba |
| 16:00 UTC−03:00 | Paulo Baier (yellow card) 8' (goal) 86'; Chico (yellow card) 27'; Valencia (yellow card) 37' | (Report) | André Dias (yellow card) 37'; Miranda (yellow card) 63'; Borges (yellow card) 72'; Dagoberto (yellow card) 76' | Stadium: Arena da Baixada; Attendance: 24,300; Referee: Marcelo de Lima Henrique |

| 30 August Round 22 | São Paulo | 0–0 | Palmeiras | São Paulo |
| 16:00 UTC−03:00 | Miranda (yellow card) 45'; Jorge Wagner (yellow card) 86' | (Report) | Diego Souza (yellow card) 14'; Obina (yellow card) 27' | Stadium: Morumbi; Attendance: 41,083; Referee: Héber Roberto Lopes |

| 5 September Round 23 | Cruzeiro | 1–2 | São Paulo | Belo Horizonte |
| 16:00 UTC−03:00 | Elicarlos (yellow card) 23'; Diego Renan 44' | (Report) | André Dias (yellow card) 10'; Richarlyson (yellow card) 26'; Marlos 65'; Borges 81'; Arouca (yellow card) 84' | Stadium: Mineirão; Referee: Luis Antônio Silva Santos |

| 13 September Round 24 | São Paulo | 2–0 | Avaí | São Paulo |
| 16:00 UTC−03:00 | Dagoberto 75'; Hugo 84' | (Report) | Luiz Ricardo (yellow card) 55' | Stadium: Morumbi; Attendance: 29,496; Referee: Leandro Vuaden |

| 20 September Round 25 | Santo André | 1–1 | São Paulo | Santo André |
| 16:00 UTC−03:00 | Cesinha (yellow card) 21'; Marcelinho Carioca (yellow card) 30'; Pablo Escobar 71' | (Report) | Jean 7'; Jorge Wagner (yellow card) 38'; Arouca (yellow card) 68' | Stadium: Bruno Daniel; Referee: Flávio Guerra |

| 27 September Round 26 | São Paulo | 1–1 | Corinthians | São Paulo |
| 16:00 UTC−03:00 | Dagoberto (yellow card) 28'; Richarlyson (yellow card) 45+1'; Washington 70' (yellow card) 70' (yellow-red card) 89' | (Report) | Defederico (yellow card) 3'; Ronaldo 20'; Jorge Henrique (yellow card) 32'; William (yellow card) 80' | Stadium: Morumbi; Attendance: 32,180; Referee: Ricardo Marques Ribeiro |

| 4 October Round 27 | Náutico | 1–2 | São Paulo | Recife |
| 16:00 UTC−03:00 | Vágner (yellow card) 7'; Bruno Mineiro 12'; Derley (yellow card) 50'; Cláudio Luiz (yellow card) 58' (yellow-red card) 85'; Elton (yellow card) 71'; Márcio (yellow card) 81'; Carlinhos Bala (yellow card) 87'; Michel (red card) 90+1' | (Report) | Júnior César (yellow card) 5' (yellow-red card) 32'; Richarlyson (yellow card) 32' (yellow-red card) 73'; Renato Silva (yellow card) 57'; Hernanes 59'; Hugo 88'; Miranda (yellow card) 90'; Jorge Wagner (yellow card) 90+3' | Stadium: Aflitos; Attendance: W Referee: Francisco Carlos Nascimento |

| 7 October Round 28 | São Paulo | 2–2 | Coritiba | São Paulo |
| 16:00 UTC−03:00 | Hernanes 23'; Washington 66'; Dagoberto (yellow card) 72'; González (yellow card) 86' | (Report) | Renatinho 37'; Marcelinho Paraíba 41'; Jéci (yellow card) 53'; Pereira (yellow card) 70'; Thiago Gentil (yellow card) 83'; Marcos Aurélio (yellow card) 90+1' | Stadium: Morumbi; Attendance: 16,602; Referee: Carlos Eugênio Simon |

| 10 October Round 29 | Flamengo | 2–1 | São Paulo | Rio de Janeiro |
| 16:00 UTC−03:00 | Álvaro (yellow card) 32'; Zé Roberto (yellow card) 43' (goal) 80'; Everton Silva (yellow card) 49'; Petković 65' (pen.); Bruno Mezenga (yellow card) 75' | (Report) | Hernanes 25' (yellow card) 42'; Júnior César (yellow card) 50'; Richarlyson (yellow card) 52'; Jorge Wagner (yellow card) 61'; Rogério Ceni (yellow card) 64'; Hugo (yellow card) 84' | Stadium: Maracanã; Referee: Wilton Pereira Sampaio |

| 18 October Round 30 | São Paulo | 0–1 | Atlético Mineiro | São Paulo |
| 16:00 UTC−03:00 | Richarlyson (yellow card) 78' | (Report) | Diego Tardelli 1'; Jonílson (yellow card) 8'; Jorge Luiz (yellow card) 55'; Carlos Alberto (yellow card) 63'; Ricardinho (yellow card) 70'; Corrêa (yellow card) 88' | Stadium: Morumbi; Attendance: 25,947; Referee: Héber Roberto Lopes |

| 25 October Round 31 | Santos | 3–4 | São Paulo | Santos |
| 16:00 UTC−03:00 | André 5'; Rodrigo Souto 25'; Germano (yellow card) 57'; Róbson 66'; Adaílton (yellow card) 80' | (Report) | Hernanes 11'; Washington 38'; André Dias (yellow card) 52'; Jorge Wagner 59'; Rogério Ceni 68' (red card) 78'; Jean (yellow card) 73'; Miranda (yellow card) 83' | Stadium: Vila Belmiro; Referee: Carlos Eugênio Simon |

| 28 October Round 32 | São Paulo | 1–0 | Internacional | São Paulo |
| 16:00 UTC−03:00 | Washington 45+2'; Bosco (yellow card) 63'; Jean (yellow card) 79' | (Report) | Giuliano (yellow card) 38' | Stadium: Morumbi; Attendance: 34,203; Referee: Sandro Meira Ricci |

| 1 November Round 33 | São Paulo | 1–0 | Barueri | São Paulo |
| 16:00 UTC−03:00 | Jorge Wagner 4'; Miranda (yellow card) 44' | (Report) | Leandro Castán (yellow card) 58'; André Luís (yellow card) 69' | Stadium: Morumbi; Attendance: 39,636; Referee: Wilson Luiz Seneme |

| 4 November Round 34 | Grêmio | 1–1 | São Paulo | Porto Alegre |
| 16:00 UTC−03:00 | Túlio (yellow card) 17'; Rafael Marques 24'; Maxi López (yellow card) 53'; Tcheco (yellow card) 65'; Souza (yellow card) 76' | (Report) | Dagoberto 31' (red card) 79'; Jean (yellow card) 69' (yellow-red card) 90+3'; Borges (yellow card) 70' (yellow-red card) 73'; André Dias (yellow card) 86' | Stadium: Olímpico; Referee: Jaílson Macedo de Freitas |

| 15 November Round 35 | São Paulo | 2–0 | Vitória | São Paulo |
| 19:30 UTC−03:00 | André Dias (yellow card) 16'; Hugo (yellow card) 16' (goal) 48'; Jorge Wagner 24' | (Report) | Carlos Alberto (yellow card) 17'; Vanderson (yellow card) 85' | Stadium: Morumbi; Attendance: 53,204; Referee: Leandro Pedro Vuaden |

| 22 November Round 36 | Botafogo | 3–2 | São Paulo | Rio de Janeiro |
| 17:00 UTC−03:00 | Jóbson 14' 89' (yellow card) 61' (yellow-red card) 89'; Renato (yellow card) 22' (goal) 58'; Juninho (yellow card) 83'; Rodrigo Dantas (yellow card) 90+3' | (Report) | Renato Silva (yellow card) 29'; Washington 40+5'; Jorge Wagner 56'; Richarlyson (yellow card) 61' (yellow-red card) 71'; Wellington (yellow card) 85' | Stadium: Engenhão; Referee: Sandro Meira Ricci |

| 29 November Round 37 | Goiás | 4–2 | São Paulo | Goiânia |
| 17:00 UTC−03:00 | Vítor 21'; Rithelly 37' (yellow card) 59'; Fernando (yellow card) 29'; Iarley (yellow card) 63'; Fernandão 66'; Léo Lima 72'; Júlio César (yellow card) 76' | (Report) | Washington 16' 70' | Stadium: Serra Dourada; Referee: Heber Roberto Lopes |

| 6 December Round 38 | São Paulo | 4–0 | Sport Recife | São Paulo |
| 17:00 UTC−03:00 | Renato Silva (yellow card) 26' (yellow-red card) 39'; Washington 34' 64' 88'; Rogério Ceni 52'; Zé Luís (yellow card) 81' | (Report) | Moacir (yellow card) 11' (yellow-red card) 31'; Vandinho (yellow card) 37'; Cesar (yellow card) 51' (yellow-red card) 73'; Dutra (yellow card) 69' | Stadium: Morumbi; Attendance: 30,937; Referee: Sandro Meira Ricci |

==== Record ====
| Final position | Points | Matches | Wins | Draws | Losses | Goals for | Goals against | Win% |
|---|---|---|---|---|---|---|---|---|
| 3rd | 65 | 38 | 18 | 11 | 9 | 57 | 42 | 57% |

== Honours ==
=== Individuals ===
| Name | Number | Country | Award |
|---|---|---|---|
| André Dias | 3 | Brazil | Paulista Team of the Year (2009), Série A Team of the Year (2009), Silver Ball (2009) |
| Miranda | 5 | Brazil | Série A Team of the Year (2009), Silver Ball (2009) |
| Washington | 9 | Brazil | Paulista Team of the Year (2009) |
| Hernanes | 10 | Brazil | Série A Team of the Year (2009) |
