= 2008 São Paulo FC season =

São Paulo
2008 season
- Chairman: Juvenal Juvêncio
- Manager: Muricy Ramalho
- Série A: Champions (6th title)
- Copa Libertadores: Quarter-finals
- Copa Sudamericana: First round
- Campeonato Paulista: Semi-finals
- Top goalscorer: League: Borges (16); All: Borges (26)
- Highest home attendance: 66,888 ( v Fluminense in the Campeonato Brasileiro)
- Lowest home attendance: 5,058 ( v Paulista in the Campeonato Paulista)

The 2008 season was São Paulo's 79th season since club's existence. In Campeonato Paulista was eliminated in semifinals by rival Palmeiras. The club participated in the Copa Libertadores for the fifth time being defeated by the Fluminense in the quarterfinals. However the consecration became for the third time in Série A with an unprecedented done of three nationals titles in a row, reaching 6 titles altogether becoming the greatest Brazilian champion in history of league (since 1971), the trophy came in the last round with a victory by 1–0 over Goiás in the Bezerrão stadium situated in city of Gama, in the Federal District. The single goal was scored by forward Borges along the 22 minutes of first half. For the Copa Sudamericana was eliminated in penalty shootout by Atlético Paranaense.

== Squad ==
- Final squad

Note: Flags indicate national team as defined under FIFA eligibility rules; some limited exceptions apply. Players may hold more than one non-FIFA nationality.

No.	Pos.	Nation	Player
1	GK	BRA	Rogério Ceni
22	GK	BRA	Bosco
24	GK	BRA	Fabiano
2	DF	BRA	Juninho
3	DF	BRA	André Dias
5	DF	BRA	Miranda
13	DF	BRA	Anderson
31	DF	BRA	Aislan
44	DF	BRA	Rodrigo
12	DF	BRA	Joílson
16	DF	BRA	Jancarlos
6	DF	BRA	Júnior
20	MF	BRA	Richarlyson

No.	Pos.	Nation	Player
7	MF	BRA	Jorge Wagner
15	MF	BRA	Hernanes
18	MF	BRA	Hugo
23	MF	BRA	Zé Luís
27	MF	BRA	Sérgio Mota
34	MF	BRA	Bruno
36	MF	BRA	Oscar
38	MF	BRA	Jean
9	FW	BRA	Éder Luís
17	FW	BRA	Borges
19	FW	BRA	André Lima
25	FW	BRA	Dagoberto

== Transfers ==
=== In ===
Note: Flags indicate national team as defined under FIFA eligibility rules; some limited exceptions apply. Players may hold more than one non-FIFA nationality.

No.	Pos.	Nation	Player
12	DF	BRA	Joílson (from Botafogo)
10	FW	BRA	Adriano (on loan from Internazionale)
2	DF	BRA	Juninho (from Botafogo)
8	MF	BRA	Fábio Santos (on loan from Lyon)
19	MF	BRA	Carlos Alberto (on loan from Werder Bremen)
21	DF	BRA	Éder (on loan from Noroeste)
9	FW	BRA	Éder Luís (on loan from Atlético Mineiro)
16	DF	BRA	Jancarlos (from Atlético-PR)
19	FW	BRA	André Lima (on loan from Hertha Berlin)
13	DF	BRA	Anderson (on loan from Lyon)
44	DF	BRA	Rodrigo (on loan from Dynamo Kyiv)

=== Out ===
Note: Flags indicate national team as defined under FIFA eligibility rules; some limited exceptions apply. Players may hold more than one non-FIFA nationality.

No.	Pos.	Nation	Player
—	DF	BRA	Breno (to Bayern Munich)
—	FW	BRA	Leandro (to Tokyo Verdy)
—	MF	BRA	Diego Tardelli (to Flamengo)
—	MF	BRA	Jadílson (on loan to Cruzeiro)
—	DF	BRA	Danilo Silva (return to Guarani)
—	MF	BRA	Fernando (to Goiás)
21	MF	BRA	Souza (to PSG)
19	MF	BRA	Carlos Alberto (return to Werder Bremen)
10	FW	BRA	Adriano (return to Internazionale)
8	MF	BRA	Fábio Santos (return to Lyon)
13	DF	ECU	Reasco (to LDU)
4	DF	BRA	Alex Silva (to Hamburger SV)
14	FW	BRA	Aloísio (to Al Rayyan)
26	DF	BRA	Alex Cazumba (on loan to Figueirense)
33	DF	BRA	Alex Bruno (on loan to Figueirense)
21	DF	BRA	Éder (return to Noroeste)

== Scorers ==
Position	Nation	Playing position	Name	Campeonato Paulista	Copa Libertadores	Campeonato Brasileiro	Copa Sulamericana	Total
1	(Brazil)	FW	Borges	10	0	16	0	26
2	(Brazil)	FW	Adriano	11	6	0	0	17
3	(Brazil)	MF	Hugo	0	0	14	0	14
4	(Brazil)	FW	Dagoberto	0	1	6	0	7
=	(Brazil)	MF	Hernanes	3	0	4	0	7
5	(Brazil)	FW	Éder Luís	0	0	5	0	5
=	(Brazil)	MF	Jorge Wagner	3	0	2	0	5
=	(Brazil)	GK	Rogério Ceni	1	0	4	0	5
6	(Brazil)	DF	André Dias	0	0	3	0	3
=	(Brazil)	FW	André Lima	0	0	3	0	3
=	(Brazil)	DF	Rodrigo	0	0	3	0	3
7	(Brazil)	FW	Aloísio	0	1	1	0	2
=	(Brazil)	DF	Jean	0	0	2	0	2
=	(Brazil)	MF	Souza	2	0	0	0	2
8	(Brazil)	DF	Alex Silva	0	1	0	0	1
=	(Brazil)	MF	Carlos Alberto	1	0	0	0	1
=	(Brazil)	MF	Fábio Santos	1	0	0	0	1
=	(Brazil)	DF	Jancarlos	0	0	1	0	1
=	(Brazil)	DF	Joílson	0	0	1	0	1
=	(Brazil)	DF	Juninho	1	0	0	0	1
=	(Brazil)	DF	Miranda	0	1	0	0	1
=	(Brazil)	DF	Zé Luís	0	0	1	0	1
			Total	33	10	66	0	109

== Overall ==
Games played	71 (21 Campeonato Paulista, 10 Copa Libertadores, 38 Campeonato Brasileiro, 2 Copa Sudamericana)
Games won	38 (12 Campeonato Paulista, 5 Copa Libertadores, 21 Campeonato Brasileiro, 0 Copa Sudamericana)
Games drawn	22 (5 Campeonato Paulista, 3 Copa Libertadores, 12 Campeonato Brasileiro, 2 Copa Sudamericana)
Games lost	11 (4 Campeonato Paulista, 2 Copa Libertadores, 5 Campeonato Brasileiro, 0 Copa Sudamericana)
Goals scored	109
Goals conceded	68
Goal difference	+41
Best result	5–1 (H) v Atlético Mineiro - Campeonato Brasileiro - 2008.6.7
Worst result	1–4 (A) v Palmeiras - Campeonato Paulista - 2008.3.16
Top scorer	Borges (26)

Source: São Paulo FC

== Official competitions ==
=== Campeonato Paulista ===
17 January Round 1	Guaratinguetá	1–2	São Paulo	Guaratinguetá
20:30 (UTC-3)	Renato 21'	(Report) (pt)	Adriano 46', 79'	Stadium: Estádio Dario Rodrigues Leite (Ninho da Garça); Referee: Luiz Flávio de Oliveira

20 January Round 2	São Paulo	1–0	Rio Preto	São Paulo
16:00 (UTC-3)	Souza 88'	(Report) (pt)		Stadium: Estádio Cícero Pompeu de Toledo (Morumbi); Attendance: 14,385; Referee: Claudinei Forati Silva

23 January Round 3	Ituano	1–1	São Paulo	Itu
21:45 (UTC-3)	Felipe 68'	(Report) (pt)	Souza 41'	Stadium: Estádio Municipal Dr. Novelli Júnior; Referee: Marcelo Rogério

27 January Round 4	São Paulo	0–0	Corinthians	São Paulo
16:00 (UTC-3)		(Report) (pt)		Stadium: Estádio Cícero Pompeu de Toledo (Morumbi); Attendance: 41,211; Referee: Salvio Spinola Fagundes Filho

30 January Round 5	São Paulo	3–1	Rio Claro	São Paulo
21:45 (UTC-3)	Adriano 59'; Jorge Wagner 83'; Hernanes 90+2'	(Report) (pt)	Vieira 72' (pen.)	Stadium: Estádio Cícero Pompeu de Toledo (Morumbi); Attendance: 6,035; Referee: Eduardo César Coronado Coelho

2 February Round 6	Ponte Preta	0–0	São Paulo	Campinas
16:00 (UTC-3)		(Report) (pt)		Stadium: Estádio Moisés Lucarelli; Referee: Flávio Rodrigues Guerra

7 February Round 7	São Paulo	1–1	São Caetano	São Paulo
19:30 (UTC-3)	Adriano 75'	(Report) (pt)	Douglas 82' (pen.)	Stadium: Estádio Cícero Pompeu de Toledo (Morumbi); Attendance: 6,146; Referee: Guilherme Cereta de Lima

10 February Round 8	São Paulo	3–2	Santos	São Paulo
16:00 (UTC-3)	Fábio Santos 19'; Juninho 48'; Carlos Alberto 86'	(Report) (pt)	Kléber Pereira 15'; Rodrigo Souto 56'	Stadium: Estádio Cícero Pompeu de Toledo (Morumbi); Attendance: 17.595; Referee: Antonio Rogério Batista do Prado

17 February Round 9	Marília	3–2	São Paulo	Marília
16:00 (UTC-3)	Camilo 24'; Júlio César 30' (pen.); Magno Ferreira 76'	(Report) (pt)	Hernanes 38'; Jorge Wagner 47'	Stadium: Estádio Municipal Bento de Abreu Sampaio Vidal; Referee: José Henrique de Carvalho

21 February Round 10	São Paulo	2–1	Paulista	São Paulo
19:30 (UTC-3)	Borges 8', 74'	(Report) (pt)	Diego Padilha 26'	Stadium: Estádio Cícero Pompeu de Toledo (Morumbi); Attendance: 5,058; Referee: Robério Pereira Pires

24 February Round 11	São Paulo	2–2	Noroeste	São Paulo
16:00 (UTC-3)	Hernanes 16'; Borges 25'	(Report) (pt)	Otacílio Neto 44'; Vandinho 70'	Stadium: Estádio Cícero Pompeu de Toledo (Morumbi); Attendance: 9,043; Referee: Leonardo Ferreira Lima

2 March Round 12	Mirassol	1–2	São Paulo	Mirassol
18:10 (UTC-3)	Fabinho Capixaba 90+1'	(Report) (pt)	Jorge Wagner 41'; Borges 54'	Stadium: Estádio Municipal José Maria de Campos Maia; Referee: Marcelo Aparecido Ribeiro de Souza

8 March Round 13	Portuguesa	2–0	São Paulo	Ribeirão Preto
18:10 (UTC-3)	Rogério 8'; Bruno Recife 52'	(Report) (pt)		Stadium: Estádio Santa Cruz; Referee: Milton Etsuo Ballerini

12 March Round 14	São Paulo	2–1	Barueri	São Paulo
19:30 (UTC-3)	Borges 24', 88'	(Report) (pt)	Pedrão 47'	Stadium: Estádio Cícero Pompeu de Toledo (Morumbi); Referee: Marcelo Rogério

16 March Round 15	Palmeiras	4–1	São Paulo	Ribeirão Preto
16:00 (UTC-3)	Kléber 43'; Denílson 77' (pen.); Valdivia 84' (pen.); Diego Souza 90+5' (pen.)	(Report) (pt)	Adriano 38'	Stadium: Estádio Santa Cruz; Referee: Flávio Rodrigues Guerra

23 March Round 16	Guarani	0–1	São Paulo	Campinas
16:00 (UTC-3)		(Report) (pt)	Borges 71'	Stadium: Estádio Brinco de Ouro da Princesa; Attendance: 11,412; Referee: Philippe Lombard

27 March Round 17	São Paulo	3–1	Sertãozinho	São Paulo
21:45 (UTC-3)	Borges 24', 63'; Adriano 69'	(Report) (pt)	Geílson 75'	Stadium: Estádio Cícero Pompeu de Toledo (Morumbi); Attendance: 8,400; Referee: Claudinei Forati Silva

30 March Round 18	Bragantino	0–2	São Paulo	Bragança Paulista
16:00 (UTC-3)		(Report) (pt)	Adriano 9', 20'	Stadium: Estádio Marcelo Stéfani; Referee: Wilson Luiz Seneme

6 April Round 19	São Paulo	3–1	Juventus	São Paulo
16:00 (UTC-3)	Adriano 40'; Rogério Ceni 45+4' (pen.); Borges 55'	(Report) (pt)	Lima 59'	Stadium: Estádio Cícero Pompeu de Toledo (Morumbi); Attendance: 24,476; Referee: Rodrigo Guarizo Ferreira do Amaral

13 April Semifinals	São Paulo	2–1	Palmeiras	São Paulo
16:00 (UTC-3)	Adriano 11', 47'	(Report) (pt)	Alex Mineiro 77' (pen.)	Stadium: Estádio Cícero Pompeu de Toledo (Morumbi); Attendance: 37,203; Referee: Paulo César de Oliveira

20 April Semifinals	Palmeiras	2–0	São Paulo	São Paulo
16:00 (UTC-3)	Léo Lima 22'; Valdivia 84'	(Report) (pt)		Stadium: Estádio Palestra Itália (Parque Antarctica); Attendance: 27,680; Referee: Wilson Luiz Seneme

==== Record ====
Final position	Points	Matches	Wins	Draws	Losses	Goals for	Goals against	Win%
3rd	41	21	12	5	4	33	25	65%

=== Copa Libertadores ===
27 February Group 7	Atlético Nacional (Colombia)	1–1	(Brazil) São Paulo	Medellín
19:50 (UTC-5)	Cordoba 8'	(Report)	Miranda 32'	Stadium: Estadio Atanasio Girardot; Attendance: 34,918; Referee: Víctor Hugo Rivera (PER)

5 March Group 7	São Paulo (Brazil)	2–1	(Chile) Audax Italiano	São Paulo
21:50 (UTC-3)	Adriano 74', 84'	(Report)	Villanueva 61'	Stadium: Estádio Cícero Pompeu de Toledo (Morumbi); Attendance: 29,047; Referee: Sergio Pezzotta (ARG)

20 March Group 7	Sportivo Luqueño (Paraguay)	1–1	(Brazil) São Paulo	Luque
17:40 (UTC-3)	Duarte 90+2'	(Report)	Aloísio 60'	Stadium: Estadio Feliciano Cáceres; Attendance: 10,111; Referee: Sergio Pezzotta (ARG)

2 April Group 7	São Paulo (Brazil)	1–0	(Paraguay) Sportivo Luqueño	São Paulo
21:50 (UTC-3)	Adriano 90+4'	(Report)		Stadium: Estádio Cícero Pompeu de Toledo (Morumbi); Referee: Martín Vázquez (URU)

10 April Group 7	Audax Italiano (Chile)	1–0	(Brazil) São Paulo	Santiago
21:30 (UTC-4)	Ramos 78'	(Report)		Stadium: Estadio Nacional Julio Martínez Prádanos (Nacional); Attendance: 2,454; Referee: Héctor Baldassi (ARG)

23 April Group 7	São Paulo (Brazil)	1–0	(Colombia) Atlético Nacional	São Paulo
21:50 (UTC-3)	Alex Silva 39'	(Report)		Stadium: Estádio Cícero Pompeu de Toledo (Morumbi); Referee: Carlos Torres (PAR)

30 April Round of 16	Nacional (Uruguay)	0–0	(Brazil) São Paulo	Montevideo
22:00 (UTC-3)		(Report)		Stadium: Estadio Gran Parque Central; Referee: Rubén Selman (CHI)

7 May Round of 16	São Paulo (Brazil)	2–0	(Uruguay) Nacional	São Paulo
21:50 (UTC-3)	Adriano 37'; Dagoberto 89'	(Report)		Stadium: Estádio Cícero Pompeu de Toledo (Morumbi); Attendance: 42,050; Referee: Héctor Baldassi (ARG)

14 May Quarterfinals	São Paulo (Brazil)	1–0	(Brazil) Fluminense	São Paulo
21:50 (UTC-3)	Adriano 19'	(Report)		Stadium: Estádio Cícero Pompeu de Toledo (Morumbi); Attendance: 61,593; Referee: Óscar Ruiz (COL)

21 May Quarterfinals	Fluminense (Brazil)	3–1	(Brazil) São Paulo	Rio de Janeiro
21:50 (UTC-3)	Washington 11', 90+1'; Dodô 71'	(Report)	Adriano 70'	Stadium: Estádio Jornalista Mário Filho (Maracanã); Attendance: 68,191; Referee: Carlos Amarilla (PAR)

==== Record ====
Final position	Points	Matches	Wins	Draws	Losses	Goals for	Goals against	Win%
7th	18	10	5	3	2	10	7	60%

=== Campeonato Brasileiro ===
10 May Round 1	São Paulo	0–1	Grêmio	São Paulo
18:10 (UTC-3)		(Report) (pt)	Pereira 49'	Stadium: Estádio Cícero Pompeu de Toledo (Morumbi); Attendance: 7,929; Referee: Luís Antônio Silva Santos

18 May Round 2	Atlético Paranaense	1–1	São Paulo	Curitiba
16:00 (UTC-3)	Danilo 14'	(Report) (pt)	Éder Luís 81'	Stadium: Estádio Joaquim Américo Guimarães (Arena da Baixada); Attendance: 19,844; Referee: Djalma José Beltrami

25 May Round 3	São Paulo	1–1	Coritiba	São Paulo
16:00 (UTC-3)	Borges 27'	(Report) (pt)	Rubens Cardoso 14'	Stadium: Estádio Cícero Pompeu de Toledo (Morumbi); Attendance: 5,027; Referee: Wagner Tardelli

1 June Round 4	Santos	0–0	São Paulo	Santos
16:00 (UTC-3)		(Report) (pt)		Stadium: Estádio Urbano Caldeira (Vila Belmiro); Attendance: 7,298; Referee: Leonardo Gaciba

7 June Round 5	São Paulo	5–1	Atlético Mineiro	São Paulo
18:10 (UTC-3)	Hernanes 9'; Joílson 12'; André Dias 15'; Hugo 39', 85'	(Report) (pt)	Coelho 70'	Stadium: Estádio Cícero Pompeu de Toledo (Morumbi); Attendance: 7,709; Referee: Péricles Bassols Cortez

14 June Round 6	Flamengo	2–4	São Paulo	Rio de Janeiro
16:10 (UTC-3)	Ibson 55' (pen.), 70' (pen.)	(Report) (pt)	Borges 22', 61'; Aloísio 65'; Éder Luís 90+2'	Stadium: Estádio Jornalista Mário Filho (Maracanã); Attendance: 55,228; Referee: Leonardo Gaciba

21 June Round 7	São Paulo	1–0	Sport	São Paulo
18:20 (UTC-3)	Hugo 90'	(Report) (pt)		Stadium: Estádio Cícero Pompeu de Toledo (Morumbi); Attendance: 11,560; Referee: Gutemberg de Paula Fonseca

29 June Round 8	Cruzeiro	1–1	São Paulo	Belo Horizonte
16:00 (UTC-3)	Guilherme 33'	(Report) (pt)	Borges 46'	Stadium: Estádio Governador Magalhães Pinto (Mineirão); Attendance: 37,115; Referee: Marcelo de Lima Henrique

6 July Round 9	São Paulo	1–1	Ipatinga	São Paulo
18:10 (UTC-3)	Borges 39'	(Report) (pt)	Luciano Mandí 88'	Stadium: Estádio Cícero Pompeu de Toledo (Morumbi); Attendance: 13,421; Referee: Leandro Pedro Vuaden

9 July Round 10	Náutico	2–1	São Paulo	Recife
21:45 (UTC-3)	Radamés 23'; Everaldo 57'	(Report) (pt)	Borges 20'	Stadium: Estádio Governador Magalhães Pinto (Aflitos); Attendance: 18,012; Referee: Wagner Tardelli

13 July Round 11	São Paulo	2–1	Palmeiras	São Paulo
16:00 (UTC-3)	André Dias 7'; Éder Luís 83'	(Report) (pt)	Jeci 90+2'	Stadium: Estádio Cícero Pompeu de Toledo (Morumbi); Attendance: 22,235; Referee: Carlos Eugênio Simon

16 July Round 12	Vitória	1–3	São Paulo	Salvador
21:45 (UTC-3)	Dinei 90'	(Report) (pt)	Hugo 12'; Dagoberto 74'; Éder Luís 80'	Stadium: Estádio Manoel Barradas (Barradão); Attendance: 35,000; Referee: Sérgio da Silva Carvalho

20 July Round 13	São Paulo	2–1	Botafogo	São Paulo
18:10 (UTC-3)	Rogério Ceni 34' (pen.); Dagoberto 88'	(Report) (pt)	Carlos Alberto 77'	Stadium: Estádio Cícero Pompeu de Toledo (Morumbi); Attendance: 17,598; Referee: Leandro Vuaden

23 July Round 14	Internacional	2–0	São Paulo	Porto Alegre
21:50 (UTC-3)	Nilmar 35', 62'	(Report) (pt)		Stadium: Estádio José Pinheiro Borda (Beira-Rio); Referee: Heber Roberto Lopes

27 July Round 15	São Paulo	3–1	Portuguesa	São Paulo
18:10 (UTC-3)	Hugo 62'; Dagoberto 70'; Éder Luís 85'	(Report) (pt)	Edno 48'	Stadium: Estádio Cícero Pompeu de Toledo (Morumbi); Referee: Leandro Vuaden

30 July Round 16	Figueirense	1–1	São Paulo	Florianópolis
21:50 (UTC-3)	Tadeu 9'	(Report) (pt)	Hugo 79'	Stadium: Estádio Orlando Scarpelli; Referee: Evandro Rogério Roman

3 August Round 17	São Paulo	4–0	Vasco da Gama	São Paulo
16:00 (UTC-3)	André Lima 21', 41'; Rogério Ceni 70', 88' (pen.)	(Report) (pt)		Stadium: Estádio Cícero Pompeu de Toledo (Morumbi); Attendance: 16,980; Referee: Sérgio da Silva Carvalho

6 August Round 18	Fluminense	3–1	São Paulo	Rio de Janeiro
21:50 (UTC-3)	Washington 55' (pen.), 63', 83'	(Report) (pt)	Hugo 49'	Stadium: Estádio Jornalista Mário Filho (Maracanã); Referee: Leonardo Gaciba

9 August Round 19	São Paulo	2–1	Goiás	São Paulo
18:20 (UTC-3)	Zé Luís 2'; Rodrigo 45'	(Report) (pt)	Iarley 17' (pen.)	Stadium: Estádio Cícero Pompeu de Toledo (Morumbi); Referee: Francisco de Assis Almeida Filho

17 August Round 20	Grêmio	1–0	São Paulo	Porto Alegre
16:00 (UTC-3)	Perea 8'	(Report) (pt)		Stadium: Estádio Olímpico Monumental; Attendance: 40,256; Referee: Alicio Pena Júnior

20 August Round 21	São Paulo	3–1	Atlético Paranaense	São Paulo
20:30 (UTC-3)	Hugo 46'; Borges 69'; André Lima 90'	(Report) (pt)	Pedro Oldoni 24'	Stadium: Estádio Cícero Pompeu de Toledo (Morumbi); Attendance: 6,006; Referee: Célio Amorim

24 August Round 22	Coritiba	2–2	São Paulo	Curitiba
16:00 (UTC-3)	Ricardinho 12'; Keirrison 49'	(Report) (pt)	Rodrigo 42'; Hugo 52'	Stadium: Estádio Major Antônio Couto Pereira; Referee: Marcelo de Lima Henrique

31 August Round 23	São Paulo	0–0	Santos	São Paulo
16:00 (UTC-3)		(Report) (pt)		Stadium: Estádio Cícero Pompeu de Toledo (Morumbi); Attendance: 14,547; Referee: Carlos Eugenio Simon

3 September Round 24	Atlético Mineiro	1–1	São Paulo	Belo Horizonte
22:00 (UTC-3)	Marcio Araújo 81'	(Report) (pt)	Borges 18'	Stadium: Estádio Governador Magalhães Pinto (Mineirão); Referee: Nielson Nogueira Dias

14 September Round 25	São Paulo	2–0	Flamengo	São Paulo
16:00 (UTC-3)	Dagoberto 44'; Hugo 59'	(Report) (pt)		Stadium: Estádio Cícero Pompeu de Toledo (Morumbi); Attendance: 29,325; Referee: Leandro Vuaden

21 September Round 26	Sport	0–0	São Paulo	Recife
16:00 (UTC-3)		(Report) (pt)		Stadium: Estádio Adelmar da Costa Carvalho (Ilha do Retiro); Referee: Djalma José Beltrami

28 September Round 27	São Paulo	2–0	Cruzeiro	São Paulo
16:00 (UTC-3)	André Dias 80'; Jancarlos 90+3'	(Report) (pt)		Stadium: Estádio Cícero Pompeu de Toledo (Morumbi); Attendance: 20,688; Referee: Leonardo Gaciba

4 October Round 28	Ipatinga	1–3	São Paulo	Ipatinga
16:00 (UTC-3)	Adeílson 17' (pen.)	(Report) (pt)	Jean 5'; Rodrigo 40'; Jorge Wagner 78' (pen.)	Stadium: Estádio Municipal Epaminondas Mendes Brito (Ipatingão); Referee: Evandro Rogério Roman

9 October Round 29	São Paulo	1–0	Náutico	São Paulo
20:30 (UTC-3)	Hernanes 83'	(Report) (pt)		Stadium: Estádio Cícero Pompeu de Toledo (Morumbi); Referee: Wagner Tardelli

19 October Round 30	Palmeiras	2–2	São Paulo	São Paulo
16:00 (UTC-3)	Kléber 78'; Leandro 80'	(Report) (pt)	Rogério Ceni 6' (pen.); Dagoberto 45'	Stadium: Estádio Palestra Itália (Parque Antarctica); Attendance: 26,676; Referee: Sálvio Spínola Fagundes

23 October Round 31	São Paulo	2–1	Vitória	São Paulo
20:30 (UTC-3)	Hernanes 28'; Hugo 53'	(Report) (pt)	Leonardo Silva 14'	Stadium: Estádio Cícero Pompeu de Toledo (Morumbi); Attendance: 17,173; Referee: Heber Roberto Lopes

29 October Round 32	Botafogo	1–2	São Paulo	Rio de Janeiro
21:50 (UTC-3)	Wellington Paulista 69'	(Report) (pt)	Jean 61'; Hernanes 74'	Stadium: Estádio Olímpico João Havelange (Engenhão); Attendance: 12,356; Referee: Sérgio da Silva Carvalho

2 November Round 33	São Paulo	3–0	Internacional	São Paulo
19:10 (UTC-3)	Borges 29'; Dagoberto 52'; Hugo 81'	(Report) (pt)		Stadium: Estádio Cícero Pompeu de Toledo (Morumbi); Attendance: 54,160; Referee: Elmo Resende Cunha

8 November Round 34	Portuguesa	2–3	São Paulo	São Paulo
18:10 (UTC-3)	Jonas 42', 72'	(Report) (pt)	Borges 8', 45', 88'	Stadium: Estádio Oswaldo Teixeira Duarte (Canindé); Attendance: 19,744; Referee: Wilson Luiz Seneme

16 November Round 35	São Paulo	3–1	Figueirense	São Paulo
17:00 (UTC-3)	Borges 8', 24'; Hugo 71'	(Report) (pt)	Cleiton Xavier 44'	Stadium: Estádio Cícero Pompeu de Toledo (Morumbi); Attendance: 54,648; Referee: Carlos Eugenio Simon

23 November Round 36	Vasco da Gama	1–2	São Paulo	Rio de Janeiro
17:00 (UTC-3)	Madson 30'	(Report) (pt)	Jorge Wagner 22'; Hugo 49'	Stadium: Estádio Vasco da Gama (São Januário); Attendance: 21,634; Referee: Leonardo Gaciba

30 November Round 37	São Paulo	1–1	Fluminense	São Paulo
17:00 (UTC-3)	Borges 57'	(Report) (pt)	Tartá 50'	Stadium: Estádio Cícero Pompeu de Toledo (Morumbi); Attendance: 66,888; Referee: Heber Roberto Lopes

7 December Round 38	Goiás	0–1	São Paulo	Gama
17:00 (UTC-3)		(Report) (pt)	Borges 22'	Stadium: Estádio Walmir Campelo Bezerra (Bezerrão); Referee: Jailson Macedo Freitas

==== Record ====
Final position	Points	Matches	Wins	Draws	Losses	Goals for	Goals against	Win%
1st	75	38	21	12	5	66	36	65%

=== Copa Sudamericana ===
12 August First round	Atlético Paranaense (Brazil)	0–0	(Brazil) São Paulo	Curitiba
20:10 (UTC-3)		(Report)		Stadium: Estádio Joaquim Américo Guimarães (Arena da Baixada); Attendance: 16,837; Referee: Alício Pena Júnior (BRA)

27 August First round	São Paulo (Brazil)	0–0 (3–4 p)	(Brazil) Atlético Paranaense	São Paulo
22:00 (UTC-3)		(Report)		Stadium: Estádio Cícero Pompeu de Toledo (Morumbi); Attendance: 3,252; Referee: Wagner Tardeli de Azevedo (BRA)
	Penalties
	Rogério Ceni (penalty scored); Juninho (penalty missed); Sergio Mota (penalty scored); Oscar (penalty missed); Bruno Formigoni (penalty scored)		(penalty missed) Alan Bahia; (penalty scored) Antonio Carlos; (penalty scored) Danilo; (penalty scored) Fernando; (penalty scored) Pedro Oldoni

==== Record ====
Final position	Points	Matches	Wins	Draws	Losses	Goals for	Goals against	Win%
25th	2	2	0	2	0	0	0	33%

== See also ==
- São Paulo FC
