= Bosco (footballer) =

Bosco may refer to:

- Bosco (footballer, born 1974), João Bosco de Freitas Chaves, Brazilian goalkeeper
- Bosco (footballer, born 1980), Ricardo Sales Alves do Santos, Brazilian defender
