= Formigoni =

Formigoni is a surname. Notable people with the surname include:

- Bruno Formigoni (born 1990), Brazilian footballer
- Roberto Formigoni (born 1947), Italian politician
