= Lela (footballer) =

Brazilian footballer (born 1962)

Personal information
- Full name: Reinaldo Felisbino
- Date of birth: 17 April 1962 (age 64)
- Place of birth: Bauru, Brazil
- Position: Midfielder

Senior career*
Years	Team	Apps	(Gls)
- Esporte Clube Noroeste
- Fluminense FC
- Inter de Limeira
- Coritiba Foot Ball Club
- Esporte Clube Noroeste
- * Club domestic league appearances and goals

Reinaldo Felisbino, a.k.a. Lela (born 17 April 1962) was a Brazilian football player.

Felisbino was born in Bauru, São Paulo, Brazil. He played as a right-winger, beginning and ending his career with Esporte Clube Noroeste in Bauru. He also wore the shirt of Fluminense Football Club, Inter de Limeira and Coritiba Foot Ball Club.

He won the Campeonato Brasileiro title in 1985 as captain of Coritiba, the greatest accomplishment in his playing career.

He is the father of players Alecsandro and Richarlyson.
