= Alecsandro =

Brazilian footballer (born 1981)

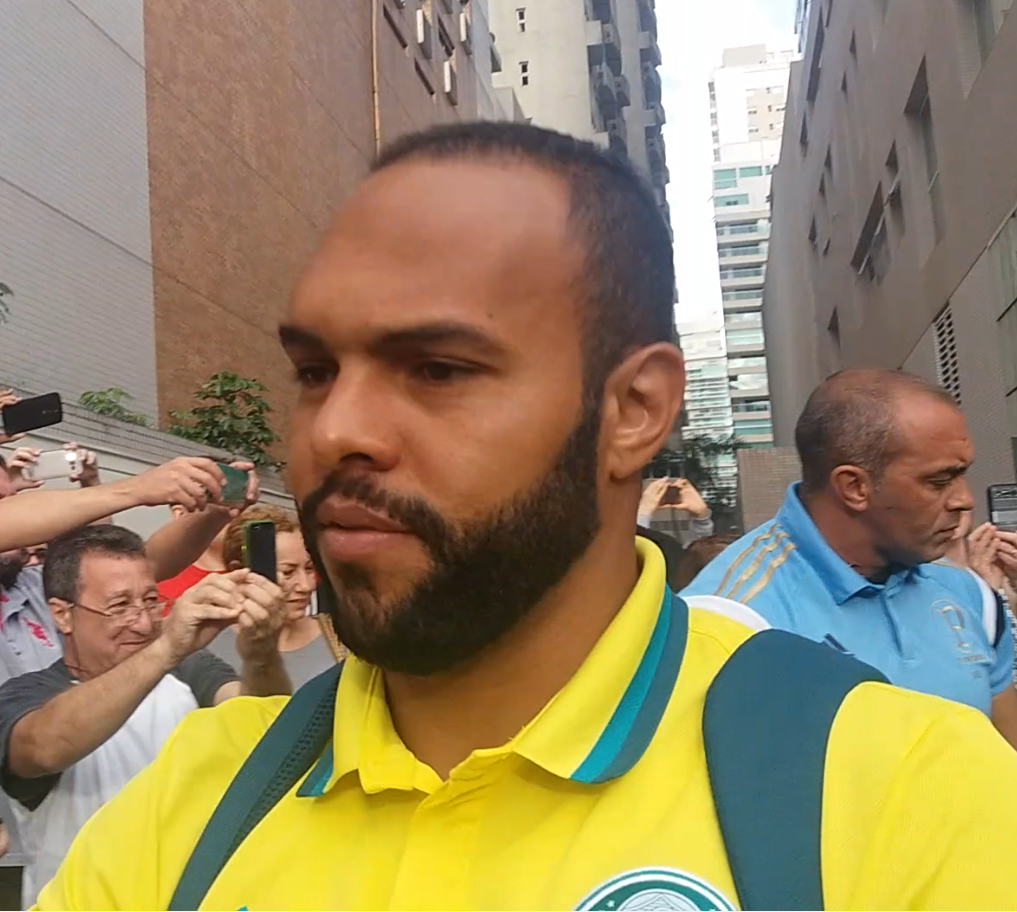
- Alecsandro with Palmeiras in 2016

Personal information
- Full name: Alecsandro Barbosa Felisbino
- Date of birth: 4 February 1981 (age 45)
- Place of birth: Bauru, Brazil
- Height: 1.83 m (6 ft 0 in)
- Position: Forward

Youth career
- 1999–2000: Vitória

Senior career*
Years	Team	Apps	(Gls)
2001–2005	Vitória	68	(31)
2004	→ Sport (loan)	17	(3)
2004	→ Ponte Preta (loan)	14	(6)
2004	→ Cruzeiro (loan)	18	(11)
2005–2007	Cruzeiro	33	(17)
2006–2007	→ Sporting CP (loan)	35	(8)
2007–2008	Al-Wahda	2	(4)
2009–2011	Internacional	120	(56)
2011–2012	Vasco da Gama	97	(39)
2013	Atlético Mineiro	50	(11)
2014–2015	Flamengo	73	(32)
2015–2017	Palmeiras	59	(14)
2017	→ Coritiba (loan)	15	(1)
2018	Coritiba	31	(6)
2019	São Bento	18	(2)
2019–2020	CSA	29	(3)
2020	Figueirense	13	(1)
2021–2022	Noroeste	15	(3)
2022	Primavera	15	(5)
- * Club domestic league appearances and goals

Alecsandro Barbosa Felisbino (born 4 February 1981), simply known as Alecsandro, is a Brazilian former professional footballer who played as a forward.

== Career ==
Alecsandro was born in Bauru. In the 2006–07 season, he played on loan for Portuguese club Sporting.

Alecsandro joined Sporting with a promising record with his club Cruzeiro, 10 goals in 18 games. He recorded his first Sporting goal against Desportivo Aves in a league match.

Alecsandro returned to Cruzeiro after his loan spell with Sporting ended.

However his agent Oldegard Filho has confirmed that Alecsandro will be leaving Cruzeiro in January 2008 with Paris Saint-Germain the only club showing a firm interest.

Despite the interest from Paris Saint-Germain, he later joined Al Wahda in January 2008. He signed for Internacional on 28 January 2009.

On 19 December 2012, in an exchange for Fillipe Soutto and Leonardo, Alecsandro signed with Atlético Mineiro, where he played with his sibling Richarlyson.

Alecsandro signed with Flamengo in January 2014. During a Copa do Brasil tie against América-RN, Alecsandro suffered a skull fracture in an aerial clash with a defender, which required surgery, making him miss the rest of the season.

On 11 January 2019, Alecsandro joined Campeonato Brasileiro Série B club São Bento.

== Personal life ==
Alecsandro is son of former footballer Lela, the elder brother of Richarlyson and brother-in-law to Deco.

== Career statistics ==
As of match played 22 April 2017

Appearances and goals by club, season and competition
Club	Season	League		Cup		Continental		State League		Other		Total	
Club	Season	Apps	Goals	Apps	Goals	Apps	Goals	Apps	Goals	Apps	Goals	Apps	Goals
Cruzeiro	2007	13	10	0	0	2	0	0	0	0	0	15	10
Sporting	2006–07	25	8	0	0	0	0	–	–	0	0	25	8
Internacional	2009	35	16	12	6	4	0	15	6	0	0	66	28
Internacional	2010	20	10	0	0	15	6	14	10	0	0	49	26
Internacional	2011	0	0	0	0	1	0	1	0	0	0	2	0
Internacional	Total	55	26	12	6	20	6	30	16	0	0	117	54
Vasco da Gama	2011	21	3	8	5	5	3	5	2	0	0	39	13
Vasco da Gama	2012	31	10	0	0	10	3	16	12	0	0	57	25
Vasco da Gama	Total	52	13	8	5	15	6	21	14	0	0	96	38
Atlético Mineiro	2013	26	8	1	0	10	1	13	2	0	0	50	11
Flamengo	2014	24	7	3	2	6	2	13	10	0	0	46	21
Flamengo	2015	0	0	2	1	0	0	11	8	0	0	13	9
Flamengo	Total	24	7	5	3	6	2	24	18	0	0	59	30
Palmeiras	2015	18	2	0	0	–		0	0	0	0	18	2
Palmeiras	2016	13	3	1	0	5	1	15	8	0	0	34	12
Palmeiras	2017	0	0	0	0	0	0	7	0	0	0	7	0
Palmeiras	Total	31	3	1	0	5	1	22	8	0	0	59	14
Career total		224	85	27	14	58	16	110	58	0	0	421	165

== Honours ==
Vitória

- Copa do Nordeste: 1999
- Campeonato Baiano: 2000, 2002, 2003, 2005

Cruzeiro

- Campeonato Mineiro: 2006

Sporting

- Taça de Portugal: 2006–07

Internacional

- Campeonato Gaúcho: 2009
- Suruga Bank Championship: 2009
- Copa Libertadores: 2010

Vasco da Gama

- Copa do Brasil: 2011

Atlético Mineiro

- Campeonato Mineiro: 2013
- Copa Libertadores: 2013

Flamengo

- Campeonato Carioca: 2014

Palmeiras

- Campeonato Brasileiro Série A: 2016
