= Joílson (footballer, born 1979) =

Brazilian footballer (born 1979)

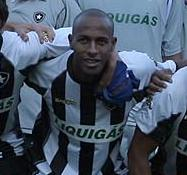

Personal information
- Full name: Joílson Rodrigues Macedo
- Date of birth: 7 July 1979 (age 47)
- Place of birth: Rio de Janeiro, Brazil
- Height: 1.68 m (5 ft 6 in)
- Position: Right back

Senior career*
Years	Team	Apps	(Gls)
1999−2002	América		
2003	Estrela do Norte		
2004	América	1	(0)
2004−2009	Tombense	0	(0)
2004−2005	→ Cruzeiro (Loan)	1	(0)
2005	→ Cabofriense (Loan)		
2005−2007	→ Botafogo (Loan)	58	(3)
2008−2009	→ São Paulo (Loan)	29	(1)
2009	→ Grêmio (Loan)	21	(0)
2010	Grêmio	3	(0)
2011−2012	Boavista	14	(0)
2011	→ Figueirense (Loan)	1	(0)
2011−2012	→ Atlético Goianiense (Loan)	53	(3)
2013−2016	Tombense	62	(9)
2013	→ Fortaleza (Loan)	14	(0)
2015	→ Metropolitano (loan)	3	(0)
2018	Angra dos Reis		
- * Club domestic league appearances and goals

Joílson Rodrigues Macedo (born 7 July 1979), or simply Joílson, is a Brazilian former football right back.

== Career ==
Since this announcement São Paulo have now stepped in and signed Joílson for the 2008 season and would be presented to the media on Monday November 19, 2007.

Joílson signed for Tombense in May 2004, his current contract run until 1 January 2013. On 6 May 2009 the 29-year-old defender, leaving the Brazilian soccer champion São Paulo FC and signed with Gremio Porto Alegre. His contract with Grêmio runs until December 2010.

Joílson moved to Boavista on 12 January 2011 after his contract with Grêmio expired. In May, he joined Figueirense on loan until the end of the 2011 season. After playing just one match for Figueirense, he moved to league rival Atlético Goianiense on 20 July 2011.

== Honours ==
Botafogo

- Campeonato Carioca: 1

2006

São Paulo

- Brazilian League: 1

2008

Tombense

- Brazilian League D: 1

2014
