= André Dias =

Brazilian footballer (born 1979)

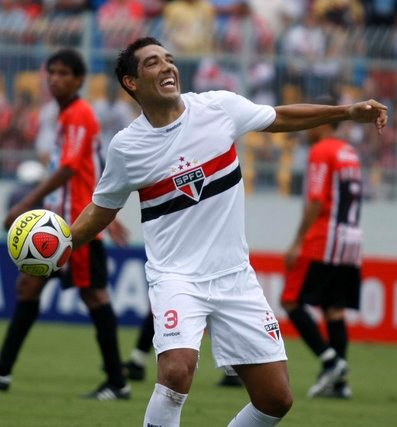

Personal information
- Full name: André Gonçalves Dias
- Date of birth: 15 May 1979 (age 47)
- Place of birth: São Bernardo do Campo, Brazil
- Height: 1.84 m (6 ft 1/2 in)
- Position: Centre back

Youth career
- Palestra de São Bernardo

Senior career*
| Years | Team | Apps | (Gls) |
| 1999–2000 | Paraná | 24 | (1) |
| 2001–2002 | Flamengo | 10 | (0) |
| 2003 | Paysandu | 26 | (1) |
| 2004–2006 | Goiás | 74 | (3) |
| 2006–2010 | São Paulo | 197 | (21) |
| 2010–2014 | Lazio | 125 | (6) |
| Total | | 456 | (32) |
- * Club domestic league appearances and goals as of 15 April 2012

André Gonçalves Dias, or simply André Dias (born 15 May 1979) is a retired Brazilian football central defender.

== Club career ==
Born in São Bernardo do Campo, André Dias first entered senior football in the 1999 Copa São Paulo de Juniores, when he played for Palestra de São Bernardo. In the same year, Dias was signed by Paraná, where he played for a year before moving to a bigger side, Flamengo. Dias stayed with Flamengo only for a short time, making ten appearances before moving again, this time to Paysandu Sport Club. Following a year at Paysandu, the defender moved to Goiás, where he established himself as a strong and talented defender.

In 2005, after two seasons at Goiás, Dias moved to play for São Paulo. He remained there until the end of the 2009 season.

=== Lazio ===
Dias secured a move to Europe on 1 February 2010, when he signed for Italian club Lazio for €2.63 million. He made 12 Serie A appearances with them in his first season and scored two quality goals.

2011–12 was the season that consolidated Dias as a pivotal part of the Lazio defence. The Brazilian centre back coupled with Biava and Diakite and guided Lazio's defence to good success and also scored 2 goals in this season.

The 2012–13 season has seen Dias play an integral role in Lazio's improvement to the top positions of the table. Under new Lazio coach Vladimir Petkovic, Dias has become important within the squad and together with Biava and Ciani, has formed a strong defence in Serie A.

In December 2013, after almost four years playing in Italy, Dias, under permission of Lazio, can accept proposals from Brazil. Thus, the defender, in some months – Besides of this, his contract with Italians also finishes in July 2014 – can come back to his country. Dias desires to play again in Brazil to staying close to his family, and said that he does not have a preferred club to continue his career, even having a great identification with his former team São Paulo FC.

== International career ==
In 2009, Dias was called up to the Brazilian national side by the manager Dunga, to face Chile in a 2010 World Cup qualifier. He did not make his debut, however.

== Career statistics ==
As of 26 June 2017

| Club | Season | League | | | National Cup | | Continental | | Other | | Total | |
| Club | Season | Division | Apps | Goals | Apps | Goals | Apps | Goals | Apps | Goals | Apps | Goals |
|---|---|---|---|---|---|---|---|---|---|---|---|---|
| Paraná | 2000 | Série A | 2 | 0 | — | | — | | — | | 2 | 0 |
| Paraná | 2001 | Série A | 22 | 1 | — | | — | | — | | 22 | 1 |
| Total | | | 24 | 1 | — | — | — | — | — | — | 24 | 1 |
| Flamengo | 2002 | Série A | 11 | 0 | — | | — | | — | | 11 | 0 |
| Total | | | 11 | 0 | — | — | — | — | — | — | 11 | 0 |
| Paysandu | 2003 | Série A | 26 | 1 | — | | — | | — | | 26 | 1 |
| Total | | | 26 | 1 | — | — | — | — | — | — | 26 | 1 |
| Goiás | 2004 | Série A | 42 | 1 | — | | 4 | 2 | — | | 46 | 3 |
| Goiás | 2005 | Série A | 32 | 2 | — | | 2 | 0 | — | | 34 | 2 |
| Total | | | 74 | 3 | — | — | 6 | 2 | — | — | 80 | 5 |
| São Paulo | 2006 | Série A | 18 | 1 | — | | 8 | 0 | 1 | 0 | 27 | 1 |
| São Paulo | 2007 | Série A | 30 | 1 | — | | 10 | 0 | — | | 40 | 1 |
| São Paulo | 2008 | Série A | 32 | 3 | — | | 6 | 0 | 3 | 0 | 41 | 3 |
| São Paulo | 2009 | Série A | 29 | 1 | — | | 5 | 0 | 15 | 2 | 49 | 3 |
| São Paulo | 2010 | Série A | 0 | 0 | — | | 0 | 0 | 3 | 1 | 3 | 1 |
| Total | | | 109 | 6 | — | — | 29 | 0 | 22 | 3 | 160 | 9 |
| Lazio | 2010–11 | Serie A | 33 | 2 | 1 | 0 | 0 | 0 | 0 | 0 | 34 | 2 |
| Lazio | 2011–12 | Serie A | 23 | 0 | 2 | 1 | 7 | 0 | — | | 32 | 1 |
| Lazio | 2012–13 | Serie A | 27 | 0 | 1 | 0 | 6 | 0 | — | | 34 | 0 |
| Lazio | 2013–14 | Serie A | 16 | 1 | 3 | 0 | — | | — | | 19 | 1 |
| Total | | | 99 | 3 | 7 | 1 | 13 | 0 | — | — | 119 | 4 |
| Career total | | | 343 | 14 | 7 | 1 | 48 | 2 | 22 | 3 | 420 | 20 |

== Honours ==
=== Club ===
São Paulo

- Brazilian League: 2006, 2007, 2008

Lazio

- Coppa Italia: 2012–13

=== Individual ===
- Bola de Prata: 2008, 2009
- Campeonato Brasileiro Série A Team of the Year: 2009
