= Adrián González (footballer, born 1976) =

Argentine footballer

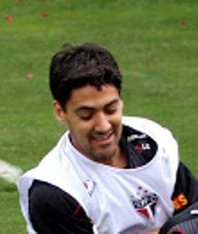
- González with São Paulo in 2009

Personal information
- Full name: Adrián Hernán González
- Date of birth: November 20, 1976 (age 49)
- Place of birth: Avellaneda, Argentina
- Height: 1.70 m (5 ft 7 in)
- Positions: Right-back; right winger

Senior career*
Years	Team	Apps	(Gls)
1995–1998	El Porvenir	77	(10)
1998–2001	San Lorenzo	39	(1)
2001–2003	Unión Santa Fe	60	(2)
2003–2004	Banfield	33	(3)
2004–2009	San Lorenzo	147	(18)
2009–2010	São Paulo	7	(0)
2010–2012	Arsenal de Sarandí	57	(4)
2012–2013	Platense	35	(1)

Managerial career
- 2014: Atlanta (assistant)
- 2016–2017: Godoy Cruz (assistant)
- 2017: Belgrano (assistant)
- 2018: Palestino (assistant)
- 2019: Cúcuta Deportivo (assistant)
- 2019–2020: Gimnasia La Plata (assistant)
- 2021: Godoy Cruz (assistant)
- 2021–2022: Tijuana (assistant)
- 2023: Unión Santa Fe (assistant)
- 2023: Vélez Sarsfield (assistant)
- 2024: Newell's Old Boys (assistant)
- * Club domestic league appearances and goals as of 01:29, 14 August 2011 (UTC)

Adrián Hernán González (born 20 November 1976 in Avellaneda) is an Argentine former footballer. He was noted as a free kick specialist who could play as either a right back or right midfielder.

== Career ==
González started his career at El Porvenir in the Regionalised 3rd Division of Argentine football in 1995.

In 1998 González joined San Lorenzo for the first time, during this spell with the club he helped the team to win the Clausura 2001 title.

After spells with Unión and Banfield González rejoined San Lorenzo in 2004.

In 2007 González helped San Lorenzo to win the Clausura tournament and was the club's captain for several seasons.

In 2009 González moved to Brazil to play for São Paulo FC.

== Honours ==
San Lorenzo

- Argentine Primera División (2): 2001 Clausura, 2007 Clausura

Arsenal

- Argentine Primera División (1): 2012 Clausura
