= Zé Luís (footballer, born 1979) =

Brazilian footballer

Personal information
- Full name: José Luís Santos da Visitação
- Date of birth: 23 March 1979 (age 47)
- Place of birth: Salvador, Brazil
- Height: 1.82 m (6 ft 0 in)
- Position: Defensive midfielder

Senior career*
Years	Team	Apps	(Gls)
1997–2002	Mogi Mirim		
1999	→ Cruzeiro (loan)		
2003	Marília	26	(4)
2004	Atlético Mineiro	7	(0)
2005–2007	São Caetano	40	(3)
2006–2007	→ Tokyo Verdy (loan)	36	(4)
2007	→ São Paulo (loan)	4	(0)
2008–2009	São Paulo	61	(2)
2010–2011	Atlético Mineiro	39	(2)
2011	Vitória	22	(1)
2012	Itumbiara	15	(3)
2012–2013	Paraná	29	(2)
- * Club domestic league appearances and goals

José Luís Santos da Visitação, or simply Zé Luís (born 23 March 1979), is a Brazilian former football defensive midfielder.

Mainly a defensive midfielder, he also played as a right back and central defender.

== Club statistics ==
Club performance			League		Cup		Total	
Season	Club	League	Apps	Goals	Apps	Goals	Apps	Goals
Japan			League		Emperor's Cup		Total	
2006	Tokyo Verdy	J2 League	15	3	0	0	15	3
2007	Tokyo Verdy	J2 League	21	1	0	0	21	1
Country	Japan		36	4	0	0	36	4
Total			36	4	0	0	36	4

== Honours ==
São Paulo

- Brazilian League: 2

2007, 2008
