= Júnior César =

Brazilian footballer

Personal information
- Full name: Júnior César Eduardo Machado
- Date of birth: April 9, 1982 (age 44)
- Place of birth: Magé, Brazil
- Height: 1.66 m (5 ft 5 in)
- Position: Left back

Youth career
- 1999–2001: Fluminense

Senior career*
| Years | Team | Apps | (Gls) |
| 2001–2004 | Fluminense | 62 | (2) |
| 2005–2006 | Santos Laguna | 31 | (2) |
| 2006 | Botafogo | 25 | (1) |
| 2007–2008 | Fluminense | 63 | (1) |
| 2009–2011 | São Paulo | 53 | (0) |
| 2011–2013 | Flamengo | 34 | (0) |
| 2012–2013 | → Atlético Mineiro (loan) | 32 | (0) |
| 2014 | Botafogo | 43 | (0) |
- * Club domestic league appearances and goals

Júnior César Eduardo Machado or simply Júnior César (born April 9, 1982, in Magé), is a Brazilian left back. He is currently a free agent.

== Career ==
Júnior César started his career at Fluminense, he subsequently played for Santos Laguna, Botafogo, São Paulo, Flamengo and Atlético Mineiro.

=== Career statistics ===
(Correct as of May 13, 2012)

| Club | Season | State League | | Brazilian Série A | | Copa do Brasil | | Copa Libertadores | | Copa Sudamericana | | Total | |
| Club | Season | Apps | Goals | Apps | Goals | Apps | Goals | Apps | Goals | Apps | Goals | Apps | Goals |
|---|---|---|---|---|---|---|---|---|---|---|---|---|---|
| Fluminense | 2001 | - | - | 3 | 0 | - | - | - | - | - | - | 3 | 0 |
| Fluminense | 2002 | - | - | - | - | 5 | 0 | - | - | - | - | 5 | 0 |
| Fluminense | 2003 | - | - | 22 | 1 | 4 | 0 | - | - | - | - | 26 | 1 |
| Fluminense | 2004 | - | - | 37 | 1 | 5 | 0 | - | - | - | - | 42 | 1 |
| Total | | 0 | 0 | 62 | 2 | 14 | 0 | 0 | 0 | 0 | 0 | 76 | 2 |
| Botafogo | 2006 | - | - | 25 | 1 | - | - | - | - | - | - | 25 | 1 |
| Total | | 0 | 0 | 25 | 1 | 0 | 0 | 0 | 0 | 0 | 0 | 25 | 1 |
| Fluminense | 2007 | - | - | 34 | 0 | 7 | 0 | - | - | - | - | 41 | 0 |
| Fluminense | 2008 | - | - | 29 | 1 | - | - | - | - | - | - | 29 | 1 |
| Total | | 0 | 0 | 63 | 1 | 7 | 0 | 0 | 0 | 0 | 0 | 70 | 1 |
| São Paulo | 2009 | 15 | 0 | 36 | 0 | - | - | 5 | 0 | - | - | 56 | 0 |
| São Paulo | 2010 | 13 | 1 | 17 | 0 | - | - | 9 | 0 | - | - | 39 | 1 |
| São Paulo | 2011 | 5 | 0 | 0 | 0 | 0 | 0 | - | - | - | - | 5 | 0 |
| Total | | 33 | 1 | 53 | 0 | 0 | 0 | 14 | 0 | 0 | 0 | 100 | 1 |
| Flamengo | 2011 | - | - | 34 | 0 | 0 | 0 | - | - | 2 | 0 | 36 | 0 |
| Flamengo | 2012 | 11 | 0 | 0 | 0 | - | - | 8 | 0 | - | - | 18 | 0 |
| Total | | 11 | 0 | 34 | 0 | 0 | 0 | 8 | 0 | 2 | 0 | 54 | 0 |

according to combined sources on the Flamengo official website and Flaestatística.

== Honours ==
Fluminense

- Rio de Janeiro State League: 2002, 2006
- Copa do Brasil: 2007

Atlético Mineiro

- Campeonato Mineiro: 2013
- Copa Libertadores: 2013
