= Rodrigo (footballer, born August 1980) =

Brazilian footballer

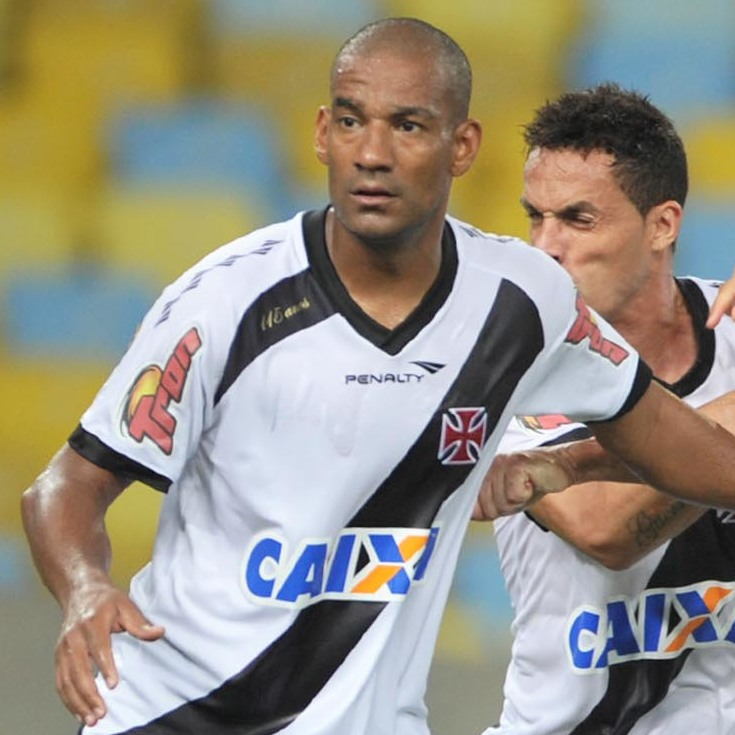

Personal information
- Full name: Rodrigo Baldasso da Costa
- Date of birth: 27 August 1980 (age 46)
- Place of birth: Lençóis Paulista, Brazil
- Height: 1.82 m (6 ft 0 in)
- Position: Centre back

Senior career*
Years	Team	Apps	(Gls)
2001–2003	Ponte Preta	61	(5)
2004–2005	São Paulo	34	(3)
2005–2010	Dynamo Kyiv	69	(16)
2008	→ Flamengo (loan)	0	(0)
2008–2009	→ São Paulo (loan)	33	(3)
2010	→ Grêmio (loan)	11	(1)
2010–2011	→ Internacional (loan)	18	(0)
2012	Vitória	15	(1)
2013	Goiás	33	(4)
2014–2017	Vasco da Gama	91	(11)
2017–2018	Ponte Preta	24	(0)
- * Club domestic league appearances and goals

Rodrigo Baldasso da Costa (born 27 August 1980), simply known Rodrigo, is a Brazilian former professional footballer who played as a central defender.

== Career ==
Rodrigo began his career in Brazil, playing for his local club Ponte Preta and after spending 3 seasons there, being 2005 Copa Libertadores champion for São Paulo.

In February 2005 he moved to Dynamo Kyiv, which he signed a new contract in August 2006. He transferred himself to Flamengo in December 2007. In his first game as a starter for Flamengo on 7 February 2008, Rodrigo fractured his arm, had a surgery and stayed out of the fields for few months. In July 2008, Rodrigo moved to São Paulo on a contract of loan until December 2008. In January 2009, the loan contract was extended to July 2009. On 11 February 2010 Dynamo Kiev confirmed that the 28-year-old center back would play on loan for one year at Gremio Porto Alegre. Later in 2010, however, Rodrigo left Grêmio for city rivals Internacional. On 11 January 2011, Rodrigo joined Esporte Clube Vitória on a free transfer. On 7 December 2012, Rodrigo joined Goiás Esporte Clube. On 27 November 2017, his team was leading 2–0 against Esporte Clube Vitória before he was sent off after made twice an invasive exploration of his opponent's buttocks. The match was abandoned with eight minutes remaining when Ponte fans invaded the pitch after Vitoria's third goal.

== Honours ==
=== Club ===
Dynamo Kyiv

- Ukrainian Premier League: 2006–07
- Ukrainian Cup: 2006–07

Flamengo

- Campeonato Carioca: 2008

São Paulo

- Campeonato Brasileiro Série A: 2008

Grêmio

- Campeonato Gaúcho: 2010

Internacional

- Campeonato Gaúcho: 2011

Vasco da Gama

- Campeonato Carioca: 2015, 2016

=== Individual ===
- Campeonato Carioca Team of the year: 2016

== Career statistics ==
As of 15 June 2009

Club performance			League		Cup		Continental		Total	
Season	Club	League	Apps	Goals	Apps	Goals	Apps	Goals	Apps	Goals
Brazil			League		Copa do Brasil		South America		Total	
2000	Ponte Preta	Copa João Havelange	1	0	2	0	–		3	0
2001	Ponte Preta	Série A	22	2	8	1	–		30	3
2002	Ponte Preta	Série A	21	1	3	0	–		24	1
2003	Ponte Preta	Série A	17	2	–		–			
2004	São Paulo	Série A	34	3	–		16	3	50	6
Ukraine			League		Ukrainian Cup		Europe		Total	
2004–05	Dynamo Kyiv	Premier League					0	0		
2005–06	Dynamo Kyiv	Premier League					1	0		
2006–07	Dynamo Kyiv	Premier League					7	0		
2007–08	Dynamo Kyiv	Premier League					0	0		
Brazil			League		Copa do Brasil		South America		Total	
2008	Flamengo	Série A	0	0	–		0	0	4^{*}	0^{*}
2008	São Paulo	Série A	20	3	–		0	0	20	3
2009	São Paulo	Série A	9	0	–		3	0	18^{**}	2^{**}
Total	Brazil		124	11	13	1	19	3	99^{***}	15^{***}
Total	Ukraine						8	0		
Career total							27	3		

^{*} Include 4 games and 0 goals in Campeonato Carioca 2008.
^{**} Include 15 games and 2 goals in 2009 Campeonato Paulista.
^{***} See * and **.
