= Sérgio Mota =

Brazilian footballer

Personal information
- Full name: Sérgio Mota Mello
- Date of birth: 16 November 1989 (age 36)
- Place of birth: São José dos Campos, Brazil
- Height: 1.75 m (5 ft 9 in)
- Position: Attacking midfielder

Youth career
- 2004–2007: São Paulo

Senior career*
Years	Team	Apps	(Gls)
2007–2012	São Paulo	13	(0)
2009	→ Toledo (loan)	11	(6)
2011	→ Ceará (loan)	12	(2)
2011	→ Icasa (loan)	1	(0)
2012	→ Santo André (loan)	1	(0)
2013	Santo André	8	(1)
2013–2015	Penapolense	22	(0)
2013	→ América-MG (loan)	2	(0)
2014	→ Botafogo-SP (loan)	2	(0)
2015	Seattle Sounders FC 2	15	(4)
2016	Luverdense	33	(3)
2017	CRB	6	(3)
2017	Luverdense	28	(4)
2018	Zhejiang Yiteng	28	(16)
2019–2021	Guizhou Hengfeng	31	(13)
2021	Vitória	0	(0)
2022–2023	Oeste	30	(0)
Total		247	(52)
- * Club domestic league appearances and goals

Sérgio Mota Mello (born 16 November 1989), is a Brazilian professional footballer who plays as an attacking midfielder.

== Career ==
Sérgio Mota would make his professional debut for top tier club São Paulo in a 2–0 away defeat to Juventude in the Campeonato Brasileiro on 8 November 2007. He would be part of the squad that won the 2007 and Campeonato Brasileiro Série A 2008 championships. To gain more playing opportunities he was loaned to Toledo, Ceará and Icasa.

On 1 February 2012, he was loaned to Santo André and he made his debut for the club 18 February 2012 in a Campeonato Paulista Série A2 game against Velo Clube in a 3–0 defeat. Despite the defeat he would make a permanent move to Santo André, however he only stayed for one season before joining Penapolense. With brief loan periods at América-MG and Botafogo-SP he would go abroad for the first time when he joined Seattle Sounders FC 2.

After only one season he returned to Brazil and joined Luverdense and quickly established himself as in integral member of the team before joining CRB.

== Career statistics ==
Appearances and goals by club, season and competition
Club	Season	League			State league		National cup		Continental		Other		Total	
Club	Season	Division	Apps	Goals	Apps	Goals	Apps	Goals	Apps	Goals	Apps	Goals	Apps	Goals
São Paulo	2007	Série A	1	0	0 (Note: Appearances in Campeonato Paulista)	0	0	0	0	0	—		1	0
São Paulo	2008	Série A	3	0	2	0	—		1	0	—		6	0
São Paulo	2009	Série A	0	0	—		—		0	0	—		0	0
São Paulo	2010	Série A	3	0	4	0	—		0	0	—		7	0
São Paulo	Total		7	0	6	0	0	0	1	0	—		14	0
Toledo (loan)	2009	—			11 (Note: Appearances in Campeonato Paranaense)	6	—		—		—		11	6
Ceará (loan)	2011	Série A	0	0	12 (Note: Appearances in Campeonato Cearense)	2	2	0	—		—		14	2
Icasa (loan)	2011	Série B	1	0	—		—		—		—		1	0
Santo André (loan)	2012	Série C	0	0	1 (Note: Appearances in Campeonato Paulista Série A2)	0	—		—		—		1	0
Santo André	2013	Série D	0	0	8	1	—		—		—		8	1
Penapolense	2013	Série D	2	0	7	0	—		—		—		9	0
Penapolense	2014	Série D	4	0	2	0	—		—		—		6	0
Penapolense	2015		—		11	0	—		—		—		11	0
Penapolense	Total		6	0	20	0	—		—		—		26	0
América-MG (loan)	2013	Série B	2	0	—		—		—		—		2	0
Botafogo-SP (loan)	2014	—			2	0	—		—		—		2	0
Seattle Sounders FC 2	2015	USL	15	4	—		2	0	—		—		17	4
Luverdense	2016	Série B	33	3	0 (Note: Appearances in Campeonato Mato-Grossense)	0	—		—		2 (Note: Appearances in Copa Verde)	0	35	5
CRB	2017	Série B	—		6 (Note: Appearances in Campeonato Alagoano)	3	—		—		5 (Note: Appearances in Copa do Nordeste)	1	11	4
Luverdense	2017	Série B	28	4	—		—		—		—		28	4
Zhejiang Yiteng	2018	China League One	28	16	—		0	0	—		—		28	16
Guizhou Hengfeng	2019	China League One	26	11	—		0	0	—		—		26	11
Guizhou Hengfeng	2020	China League One	5	2	—		0	0	—		—		5	2
Guizhou Hengfeng	Total		31	13	—		0	0	—		—		31	13
Vitória	2021	Série B	0	0	—		—		—		—		0	0
Oeste	2022	Série D	13	0	14	0	1	0	—		9 (Note: Appearances in Copa Paulista)	1	37	1
Oeste	2023	—			3	0	—		—		—		3	0
Oeste	Total		13	0	17	0	1	0	—		9	1	40	1
Career total			164	40	83	12	5	1	1	0	16	1	269	54

== Honours ==
São Paulo

- Campeonato Brasileiro Série A: 2007, 2008

Luverdense

- Campeonato Mato-Grossense: 2016

CRB

- Campeonato Alagoano: 2017
