= Jonílson =

Brazilian footballer

Personal information
- Full name: Jonílson Clovis Nascimento Breves
- Date of birth: 28 November 1978 (age 47)
- Place of birth: Pinheiral, Brazil
- Height: 1.75 m (5 ft 9 in)
- Position: Defensive midfielder

Youth career
- 1996–1997: Ceará

Senior career*
Years	Team	Apps	(Gls)
1998–2004	Volta Redonda		
2005	Botafogo	36	(0)
2006–2007	Cruzeiro	17	(1)
2007	→ Vegalta Sendai (loan)	42	(0)
2008	Vasco da Gama	27	(0)
2009	Botafogo (SP)	17	(0)
2009–2010	Atlético Mineiro	40	(1)
2010	Goiás	26	(1)
2011	Volta Redonda	21	(0)
2012	Comercial-SP	6	(0)
2013–2014	São José EC	8	(0)
2015–2016	Doze		
2017	Miguelense	16	(1)
2018	Barcelona-RO	6	(0)
2019	Barra Mansa		
2020	Barretos	4	(0)
- * Club domestic league appearances and goals

Jonilson Clovis Nascimento Breves or Jonilson (born 28 November 1978) is a Brazilian former association football player.

== Club statistics ==
Club performance			League	
Season	Club	League	Apps	Goals
Brazil			League	
2005	Botafogo	Série A	36	0
2006	Cruzeiro	Série A	17	0
Japan			League	
2007	Vegalta Sendai	J2 League	42	0
Brazil			League	
2008	Vasco da Gama	Série A	27	0
Country	Brazil		80	0
Country	Japan		42	0
Total			122	0

== Achievements ==
- Rio de Janeiro's Cup: 2000, 2002
- Rio de Janeiro State League (2nd division): 2004
- Guanabara Cup: 2005
- Minas Gerais State League: 2006
