= Wagner Diniz =

Brazilian footballer (born 1983)

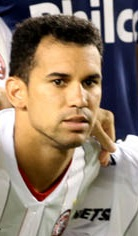

Personal information
- Full name: Wagner Diniz Gomes de Araújo
- Date of birth: 21 September 1983 (age 43)
- Place of birth: Maceió, Brazil
- Height: 1.70 m (5 ft 7 in)
- Position: Right back

Youth career
- 2000–2002: CRB

Senior career*
Years	Team	Apps	(Gls)
2003–2005	CRB		
2004–2005	→ Treze (loan)		
2005–2008	Vasco da Gama	106	(6)
2009–2011	São Paulo	1	(0)
2009	→ Santos (loan)	6	(0)
2010–2011	→ Atlético Paranaense (loan)	35	(3)
2012	Itumbiara		
2012	Avaí		
2013	São Bernardo		
2014	Marília		
2015–2016	America		
2017	Rio Negro		
2017	Fast Clube	6	(0)
2019–2020	America		
2022	Murici	6	(0)
- * Club domestic league appearances and goals as of 12 April 2022

Wagner Diniz Gomes de Araújo (born 21 September 1983), or simply Wagner Diniz, is a Brazilian football right back.

== Honours ==
Treze

- Campeonato Paraibano: 2005

América

- Campeonato Carioca Série B: 2015
