= Bosco (footballer, born 1980) =

Brazilian footballer

Personal information
- Full name: Ricardo Sales Alves do Santos
- Date of birth: 16 November 1980 (age 45)
- Height: 1.77 m (5 ft 10 in)
- Position: Defender

Senior career*
Years	Team	Apps	(Gls)
2002	Atlético Mineiro		
2003–2004	Örgryte		
2005	Ituano		
2006	Paulista		
2007	Grêmio Barueri		
2008	ABC		
2008–2009	Vitória		
2009	ABC		
2010	Mirassol		
2010	Paysandu		
2011	Novo Hamburgo		
2011	Ipatinga		
- * Club domestic league appearances and goals

Ricardo Sales Alves do Santos, known as Bosco (born 16 November 1980) is a retired Brazilian football defender.
