= Richarlyson =

Brazilian footballer (born 1982)

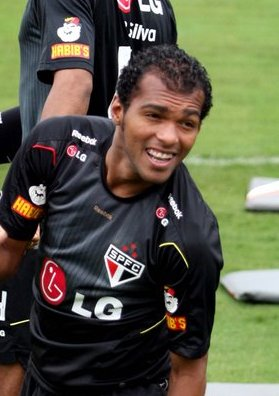
- Richarlyson with São Paulo FC in 2010

Personal information
- Full name: Richarlyson Barbosa Felisbino
- Date of birth: 27 December 1982 (age 43)
- Place of birth: Natal, Rio Grande do Norte, Brazil
- Height: 1.76 m (5 ft 9 in)
- Positions: Defensive midfielder; left-back

Youth career
- 1998–2001: Ituano

Senior career*
Years	Team	Apps	(Gls)
2002–2005	Santo André	33	(9)
2003	→ Fortaleza (loan)	16	(1)
2003–2005	→ Salzburg (loan)	27	(2)
2005–2010	São Paulo	147	(6)
2011–2013	Atlético Mineiro	101	(2)
2014	Vitória	24	(1)
2015	Chapecoense	13	(0)
2016	Novorizontino	5	(1)
2016	FC Goa	12	(1)
2017	Guarani	22	(1)
2018	Cianorte	9	(1)
2019	Noroeste	16	(1)
2019	Campinense	2	(0)
2020	Noroeste	11	(2)
2021	America-RJ	7	(1)
2021	Noroeste	11	(1)
Total		456	(30)

International career
2008	Brazil	2	(0)
- * Club domestic league appearances and goals as of 19:39, 27 July 2021 (UTC)

Richarlyson Barbosa Felisbino, known mononymously as Richarlyson (born 27 December 1982), is a Brazilian former professional footballer. Mainly a defensive midfielder, he could also play as a left back or central defender. He currently works as a pundit for SporTV.

== Career ==
Richarlyson began playing football for Ituano, where he won the Copa São Paulo de Juniores. Ricky then moved on to Santo André, a club from the ABC region in Greater São Paulo which his father, the former footballer Lela, has also defended during his playing career. Loaned to Fortaleza and Austrian top flight club Salzburg, the midfielder drew the attention of São Paulo city giants Palmeiras. Concerns about a possible change of his nickname – from his first name, Richarlyson, to his last name, Felisbino – due to the relatively complicated pronounce and spelling, upon Palmeiras' request, made Richarlyson uneasy about joining the club, which culminated in a last-minute decision to instead move to São Paulo, one of Palmeiras' rivals.

A court battle between São Paulo and Santo André delayed his debut for the Morumbi club, even after both clubs have reached a settlement. With few opportunities in the main squad, Richarlyson languished until the hiring of the coach Muricy Ramalho. Under the command of Ramalho, Richarlyson went on to have the best phase of his career as a footballer, being an integral part of São Paulo's three Campeonato Brasileiro championships in a row. At the peak of his career, Richarlyson was called by the Brazil national team's coach Dunga for their friendly against Republic of Ireland. The former captain of the Seleção greatly praised Richarlyson's versatility. Richarlyson, despite his success for the club, was a target of constant scrutiny and abuse over allegations of homosexuality, to the point where even São Paulo supporters would sing demeaning and homophobic chants against him.

After a long spell at São Paulo, however, his form seemed to worsen. Becoming increasingly reckless, Richarlyson was sent off in important matches, such as the Copa Libertadores fixture against Universitario, and a match against Fluminense, when he called the match referee a "son of a bitch", telling him to "go fuck himself", and then ending his rant by stating that the referee "besides it all, he's [also] a faggot" in a burst of anger when leaving the field. The constant sending-offs, alongside a lack of technical quality, have forced São Paulo to negotiate the midfielder.

Atlético Mineiro, from Belo Horizonte, looking for reinforcements, signed the player, as the year's "top signing" for the team. A constant presence in the starting eleven, Ricky achieved success with the Champions of the Ice, winning the 2012 Campeonato Mineiro and making a stellar campaign in the 2012 Campeonato Brasileiro Série A, taking the Galo to the 2013 Copa Libertadores after a 13-year absence from the competition. In 2013, Richarlyson was joined by his brother, the forward Alecsandro, being the first time the two brothers have played together for the same team.

In December 2014, Richarlyson confirmed his retirement from football. The decision was made after the relegation of his latest club, Vitória, for Campeonato Brasileiro Série B. On 27 January 2015, however, he stepped back from retirement and signed for Chapecoense.

== Personal life ==
In 2022, Richarlyson came out as bisexual in an interview with the podcast Nos Armários dos Vestiários. This made him the first openly LGBT player to have played for the Brazilian men's national team and in the Campeonato Brasileiro Série A.

In 2023, he cosplayed as a ceramic water filter in the reality singing competition The Masked Singer Brasil.

=== Defamation grounded on his sexuality ===
On 25 June 2007, the newspaper Agora São Paulo reported that a football player of a major team would come out of the closet as a homosexual in an exclusive interview for the weekly newsmagazine Fantástico. The following day, Brazilian sports commentator Milton Neves invited the director of Palmeiras football club José Cyrillo Júnior for his live TV show Debate Bola. During the show, Neves asked Cyrillo Jr. if the player who was coming out was from his team. Cyrillo Jr. answered that "Richarlyson was almost taken by Palmeiras". Despite the public and the press overall seeing this as a potential give-away, the player did not comment on the case. The fact that Richarlyson turned down an offer from Palmeiras in the last minute, just before signing for rival São Paulo, put him in loggerheads with former Palmeiras director of football Salvador Hugo Palaia, which raised speculations about the team being homophobic. The rumors proved to be false later.

Richarlyson's attorney, Renato Salge, filed a lawsuit against Cyrillo Jr. for damages and defamation. Judge Manoel Maximiano Junqueira Filho dismissed the lawsuit and justified his decision by stating that football is a "virile, masculine sport and not a homosexual one" and that, on those grounds, "Richarlyson should be forever banished by FIFA and never be allowed to play football again". He suggested that a homosexual player should leave the team or start one of his own. After this ruling, the judge was given fifteen days to explain himself to the Justice Council of São Paulo and was also taken to court by Salge.

== Career statistics ==
=== International ===
Appearances and goals by national team and year
National team	Year	Apps	Goals
Brazil	2008	2	0
Total		2	0

== Honours ==
Santo André

- Copa do Brasil: 2004

São Paulo

- Campeonato Brasileiro Série A: 2006, 2007, 2008
- FIFA Club World Cup: 2005

Atlético Mineiro

- Copa Libertadores: 2013
- Campeonato Mineiro: 2012, 2013

Individual

- Campeonato Brasileiro Série A Team of the Year: 2007
- Bola de Prata: 2007
