= Diogo Silvestre =

Brazilian footballer (born 1989)

Personal information
- Full name: Diogo Silvestre Bittencourt
- Date of birth: 30 December 1989 (age 36)
- Place of birth: Paranavaí, Brazil
- Height: 1.76 m (5 ft 9 in)
- Position: Left-back

Youth career
- 2004–2006: Marília
- 2006–2009: São Paulo

Senior career*
Years	Team	Apps	(Gls)
2009–2013	São Paulo	6	(0)
2009	→ Toledo (loan)	0	(0)
2010	→ Goiás (loan)	0	(0)
2011	→ Anderlecht (loan)	0	(0)
2013	Braga B	5	(0)
2013–2014	Feirense	27	(1)
2014–2016	Peñarol	40	(2)
2016–2017	Estudiantes	0	(0)
2017	Danubio	7	(0)
2018	CA Juventus	0	(0)
2018	Ferroviária		
2019	Vitória ES		
- * Club domestic league appearances and goals

Diogo Silvestre Bittencourt (born 30 December 1989) is a Brazilian former professional footballer who played as a left-back.
