= 2006 Campeonato Mineiro =

Campeonato Mineiro de Futebol do Módulo I
- Season: 2006
- Champions: Cruzeiro (32nd title)
- Relegated: Uberlândia; URT
- 2007 CB: Cruzeiro; Ipatinga
- 2006 Série C: América; Ipatinga; Ituiutaba
- Matches: 72
- Goals: 218 (3.03 per match)
- Top goalscorer: Marcelo Pelé (Democrata-SL) - 9 goals
- Biggest home win: Ipatinga 4-0 URT (February 25, 2006)
- Biggest away win: Uberlândia 1-4 Democrata-SL (February 8, 2006); Guarani 0-3 Cruzeiro (February 11, 2006)
- Highest scoring: Cruzeiro 5-2 Democrata-SL (February 1, 2006); Democrata-GV 4-3 Caldense (March 5, 2006); Democrata-GV 5-2 URT (March 8, 2006); Guarani 3-4 Ipatinga (March 12, 2006)

The 2006 Campeonato Mineiro de Futebol do Módulo I was the 92nd season of Minas Gerais's top-flight professional football league. The season began on January 22 and ended on April 2. Cruzeiro won the title for the 32nd time.

== Participating teams ==
Locations of the 2006 Módulo I teams

Club	Home city	Previous season
América	Belo Horizonte	7th
Atlético	Belo Horizonte	4th
Caldense	Poços de Caldas	9th
Cruzeiro	Belo Horizonte	2nd
Democrata	Governador Valadares	1st (Second level)
Democrata	Sete Lagoas	10th
Guarani	Divinópolis	8th
Ipatinga	Ipatinga	1st
Ituiutaba	Ituiutaba	6th
Uberlândia	Uberlândia	2nd (Second level)
URT	Patos de Minas	3rd
Villa Nova	Nova Lima	5th

== League table ==
Pos	Team	Pld	W	D	L	GF	GA	GD	Pts	Qualification or relegation
1	Ipatinga	11	7	4	0	20	8	+12	25	Qualified to the Semifinals
2	Cruzeiro	11	7	3	1	19	5	+14	24	Qualified to the Semifinals
3	Atlético	11	6	4	1	17	11	+6	22	Qualified to the Semifinals
4	América	11	5	4	2	20	12	+8	19	Qualified to the Semifinals
5	Ituiutaba	11	6	0	5	18	18	0	18	
6	Democrata-SL	11	5	2	4	23	19	+4	17	
7	Caldense	11	5	1	5	14	17	−3	16	
8	Democrata-GV	11	3	2	6	18	21	−3	11	
9	Villa Nova	11	3	2	6	15	18	−3	11	
10	Guarani	11	3	1	7	15	23	−8	10	
11	Uberlândia	11	2	1	8	9	23	−14	7	Relegated
12	URT	11	1	2	8	12	25	−13	5	Relegated

Updated to match(es) played on March 16, 2006. Source: RSSSF.com
Rules for classification: 1) points; 2) wins; 3) goal difference; 4) number of goals scored.

=== Final Tournament ===
Semi-finals
4th	América	2	1	3
1st	Ipatinga	3	3	6
3rd	Atlético	2	0	2
2nd	Cruzeiro	2	2	4

Finals
1st	Ipatinga	1	0	1
2nd	Cruzeiro	1	1	2

== Finals ==
=== First leg ===
2006-03-29
16:00 (UTC-3)

Cruzeiro	1 – 1	Ipatinga
Gil 39'	(Report) (pt)	Camanducaia 19'

Mineirão, Belo Horizonte
Attendance: 35,495
Referee: Alício Pena Júnior

=== Second leg ===
2006-04-02
16:00 (UTC-3)

Ipatinga	0 – 1	Cruzeiro
	(Report) (pt)	Wagner 46'

Ipatingão, Ipatinga
Attendance: 18,487
Referee: Álvaro Quelhas

Campeonato Mineiro
2006 champion

32th title
