= Bruno Formigoni =

Brazilian footballer (born 1990)

Personal information
- Full name: Bruno Leonardo Formigoni
- Date of birth: April 18, 1990 (age 36)
- Place of birth: Sorocaba, Brazil
- Height: 1.78 m (5 ft 10 in)
- Position: Defensive midfielder

Youth career
- –2008: São Paulo

Senior career*
Years	Team	Apps	(Gls)
2008–2012	São Paulo	1	(0)
2009	→ Cerezo Osaka (loan)	1	(0)
2010	→ Paulista (loan)	0	(0)
2010	→ Figueirense (loan)	1	(0)
2011–2012	→ Paulista (loan)	0	(0)
2012–2013	Guaratinguetá	47	(1)
2014	Red Bull Brasil	0	(0)
2015	URT	0	(0)
2015	São José		
2015	Bragantino	9	(0)
2016	Batatais	0	(0)
2016	América de Natal	5	(0)
2017–2018	XV de Piracicaba	5	(0)
2018	Linense	2	(1)
2018	Batatais		
2019	Rio Claro	16	(0)
2019–2021	Inter de Limeira	18	(0)
2021	→ Rio Claro (loan)	17	(0)
2021–2022	São Bento		
- * Club domestic league appearances and goals

Bruno Leonardo Formigoni (born April 18, 1990) is a Brazilian football manager and former player

== Career statistics ==
As of 10 September 2010

Club	Season	Domestic League		Domestic Cups		Continental Competitions		Other Tournaments		Total	
Club	Season	Apps	Goals	Apps	Goals	Apps	Goals	Apps	Goals	Apps	Goals
São Paulo	2008	0	0	-	-	0	0	0	0	0	0
São Paulo	Total	0	0	0	0	0	0	0	0	0	0
Career Total		0	0	0	0	0	0	0	0	0	0
