= Alex Bruno (footballer, born 1982) =

Brazilian footballer

Personal information
- Full name: Alex Bruno Costa Fernandes
- Date of birth: May 9, 1982 (age 44)
- Place of birth: São Paulo, Brazil
- Height: 1.89 m (6 ft 2 in)
- Position: Centre back

Youth career
- 2001–2002: Águas de Lindóia
- 2002: Inter Bebedouro

Senior career*
Years	Team	Apps	(Gls)
2002–2004	Santo André	20	(1)
2004–2009	São Paulo	27	(0)
2007	→ Botafogo (loan)	24	(0)
2008	→ Figueirense (loan)	10	(0)
2009	→ Portuguesa (loan)	0	(0)
2009	→ Atlético Mineiro (loan)	12	(0)
2010	Nacional	5	(0)
2011	Sport	5	(0)
2012–2013	Paraná Clube	7	(0)
2014–2015	Rio Claro	0	(0)
2015	Marília	0	(0)
2015	Internacional de Lages	0	(0)
2015	Operário-MT	4	(1)
2015	Botafogo-PB	3	(1)
2016	Independente de Limeira	0	(0)
2017	Camboriú		
- * Club domestic league appearances and goals as of July 5, 2010

Alex Bruno Costa Fernandes (born 9 May 1982 in São Paulo) is a Brazilian former footballer who played as a centre back.

== Honours ==
Santo André

- Brazilian Cup: 2004

São Paulo

- São Paulo State League: 2005
- Copa Libertadores: 2005
- FIFA Club World Cup: 2005
- Brazilian Série A: 2006

Botafogo

- Taça Rio: 2007
