= Hugo (footballer, born 1980) =

Brazilian footballer

Personal information
- Full name: Hugo Henrique Assis do Nascimento
- Date of birth: October 27, 1980 (age 46)
- Place of birth: Rio de Janeiro, Brazil
- Height: 1.81 m (5 ft 11 1/2 in)
- Position: Attacking midfielder

Team information
- Current team: Juventude

Youth career
- 1998: Campo Grande
- 1999: Fluminense

Senior career*
Years	Team	Apps	(Gls)
2000	Atlético Paranaense		
2000	São Paulo		
2001	Monterrey		
2001–2002	Friburguense		
2002	Flamengo		
2003	Juventude		
2004	Tokyo Verdy		
2005	Corinthians		
2006	Juventude		
2006	Grêmio		
2007–2009	São Paulo		
2010	Grêmio		
2010–2012	Al-Wahda		
2012–2013	Sport		
2013	Goiás		
2014	Vitória		
2015	Thespakusatsu Gunma		
2016	Juventude		
2016	Náutico		
2017–2019	Juventude		
- * Club domestic league appearances and goals as of 21:54, 13 September 2012 (UTC)

Hugo Henrique Assis do Nascimento or simply Hugo (born October 27, 1980, in Rio de Janeiro), is a retired Brazilian attacking midfielder.

== Career ==
On 14 September 2007, he was banned for 120 days from the Brazilian championship - the Campeonato Brasileiro Série A. The Brazilian football disciplinary tribunal imposed the ban after finding the player guilty of ungentlemanly conduct during the 6-0 win over Paraná, when he spat at defender Daniel Marques.

== Honours ==
Tokyo Verdy

- Emperor's Cup: 2004

Corinthians

- Brazilian League: 2005

Grêmio

- Campeonato Gaúcho: 2006, 2010

São Paulo

- Brazilian League: 2007, 2008

Al-Wahda

- UAE Super Cup: 2011
