= Everaldo (footballer, born 1974) =

Brazilian footballer

Everaldo Batista
Personal information
- Full name: Everaldo Batista Veveu
- Date of birth: 7 June 1974 (age 52)
- Place of birth: Camaçari, Brazil
- Height: 1.85 m (6 ft 1 in)
- Position: Central defender

Senior career*
Years	Team	Apps	(Gls)
1997–1998	União São João	9	(0)
1998–2001	Borussia Dortmund II	36	(3)
1998–1999	Atlético Mineiro	11	(0)
2001–2002	SpVgg Greuther Fürth	31	(1)
2002–2003	LR Ahlen	3	(0)
2003	Palmeiras		
2004	Sport		
2006	Atlético de Ibirama		
2007	Esporte Clube Metropol		
2007	Criciúma Esporte Clube		
2007–2008	Náutico	30	(2)
2009	São Caetano	4	(0)
2009	Fortaleza	11	(0)
2010	Novo Hamburgo		
2010–2011	Bragantino	27	(0)
2011–2012	Itumbiara		
- * Club domestic league appearances and goals

Everaldo Batista or simply Everaldo (born 7 June 1974) is a Brazilian former footballer.

== Club career ==
Everaldo has played for several clubs in Brazil, including União São João, Clube Atlético Mineiro, Sport Club do Recife and Náutico. He also had spells with SpVgg Greuther Fürth and LR Ahlen in the German 2. Bundesliga. He joined LR Ahlen on a two-year contract in July 2002, but left the club after appearing in only three league matches.
