= Bosco (footballer, born 1974) =

Brazilian footballer (born 1974)

Personal information
- Full name: João Bosco de Freitas Chaves
- Date of birth: November 14, 1974 (age 51)
- Place of birth: Escada-PE, Brazil
- Height: 1.84 m (6 ft 0 in)
- Position: Goalkeeper

Youth career
- 1993–1995: Sport

Senior career*
| Years | Team | Apps | (Gls) |
| 1993–2000 | Sport | 106 | (0) |
| 2001 | Cruzeiro | 10 | (0) |
| 2002 | Portuguesa | 23 | (0) |
| 2003–2004 | Sport | 77 | (0) |
| 2004–2005 | Fortaleza | 60 | (0) |
| 2005–2011 | São Paulo | 27 | (0) |
| Total | | 303 | (0) |
- * Club domestic league appearances and goals as of November 5, 2009

João Bosco de Freitas Chaves or simply Bosco (born November 14, 1974, in Escada-PE), is a retired Brazilian goalkeeper.

== Career ==
According to Brazilian football magazine Placar, Bosco played 149 times in Campeonato Brasileiro Série A, suffered 195 goals, received 11 yellow cards and 1 red card.

=== Sport Club do Recife ===
Bosco began his career in Sport, of the city of Recife, Pernambuco (the state where Bosco was born), in 1993. He stayed in the club until 2000, when he left for Cruzeiro. He came back to Sport in 2003.

=== Cruzeiro Esporte Clube ===
Bosco moved to Cruzeiro in 2001. He stayed until 2002, when he was transferred to Portuguesa. He capped only 10 times for Cruzeiro and suffered 19 goals.

=== Portuguesa ===
Bosco stayed for a very short time in Portuguesa, in 2002. He capped 23 times for the team, and suffered 33 goals.

=== Fortaleza ===
After playing again for Sport, Bosco was sold to Fortaleza. He was the first choice goalkeeper during the 2004 season, when Fortaleza finished Série B in second place. In 2005 Fortaleza went back to the first division. In 2005, Bosco capped 33 times for Fortaleza, suffering 50 goals. He was transferred to São Paulo at the end of the year.

=== São Paulo ===
At São Paulo, Bosco was the second goalkeeper, playing in 17 games. He played an important part in the championship-winning season of 2006, as first choice keeper Rogerio Ceni was injured for lengthy periods. His last game was on November 9, 2006, against Botafogo. He played all 94 minutes and did not concede any goal in a 3-0 São Paulo win.

=== After retirement ===
On 9 January 2015, Bosco was hired as goalkeeping coach of Santa Cruz.

== Honours ==
Sport

- Campeonato Pernambucano: 1996, 1997, 1998, 1999, 2000, 2003
- Copa do Nordeste: 2000

Cruzeiro

- Copa Sul-Minas: 2001

Fortaleza

- Campeonato Cearense: 2005

São Paulo

- FIFA Club World Championship: 2005
- Campeonato Brasileiro Série A: 2006, 2007, 2008
