= 2008 Campeonato Brasileiro Série A =

Campeonato Brasileiro Série A
- Season: 2008
- Champions: São Paulo
- Relegated: Figueirense; Vasco; Portuguesa; Ipatinga
- Copa Libertadores 2009: São Paulo; Grêmio; Cruzeiro; Sport (via Copa do Brasil); Palmeiras
- Copa Sudamericana 2009: Flamengo; Internacional (as holders); Botafogo; Goiás; Coritiba; Vitória; Atlético Mineiro; Atlético Paranaense; Fluminense
- Top goalscorer: Kléber Pereira (Santos); 21 goals

The 2008 Campeonato Brasileiro Série A was the 52nd edition of the Campeonato Brasileiro Série A. It began on May 8 and ended on December 7. For the first time, one club has won the championship three times in a row. Also, São Paulo has been crowned the biggest winner in the history of the competition, winning it six times since its establishment in 1971.

== Format ==
For the sixth season, the championship was contested in a double round-robin system. The team with most points has been declared champions. Also, the tournament was a qualifier to other South American competitions:

- Copa Libertadores 2009: Top three clubs qualified for the First Stage. Team finishing in 4th will play Preliminary Round.
- Copa Sudamericana 2009: Teams finishing from 5th to 12th qualified for the first stage.

By winning the Copa do Brasil, Sport already qualified for Copa Libertadores 2009 First Stage and cannot qualify for the Copa Sudamericana 2009. Also, Internacional qualified for the Copa Sudamericana 2009 by winning the 2008 edition.

== Teams ==
=== Stadiums and locations ===
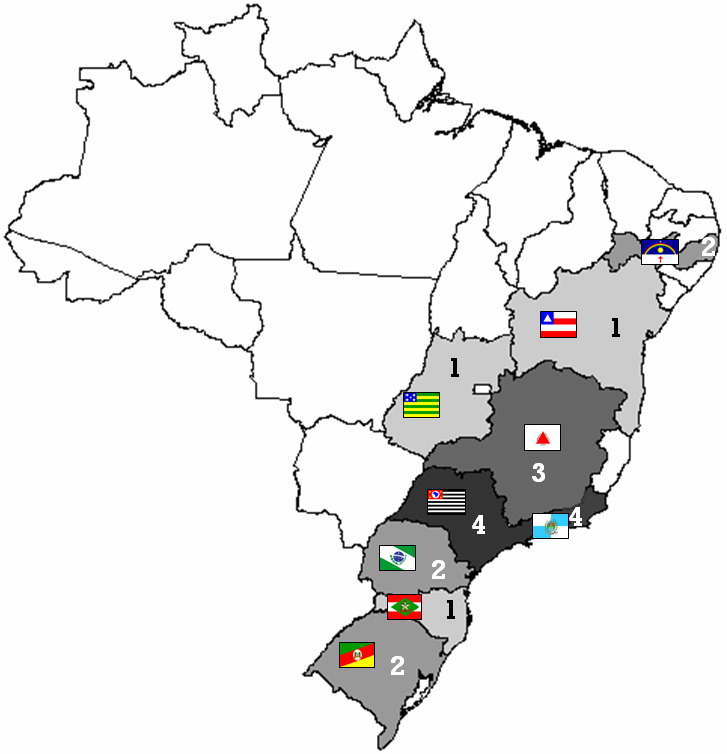
Teams that took part in the 2008 Brasileirão.

Club	City	State	2007 Season	Stadium	Titles
Atlético Mineiro	Belo Horizonte	Minas Gerais	8th	Mineirão	1971
Atlético Paranaense	Curitiba	Paraná	12th	Kyocera Arena	2001
Botafogo	Rio de Janeiro	Rio de Janeiro	9th	Engenhão	1995
Coritiba	Curitiba	Paraná	Série B Champions	Couto Pereira	1985
Cruzeiro	Belo Horizonte	Minas Gerais	5th	Mineirão	2003
Figueirense	Florianópolis	Santa Catarina	13th	Orlando Scarpelli	none
Flamengo	Rio de Janeiro	Rio de Janeiro	3rd	Maracanã	1980, 1982, 1983, 1992
Fluminense	Rio de Janeiro	Rio de Janeiro	4th	Maracanã	1984
Goiás	Goiânia	Goiás	16th	Serra Dourada	none
Grêmio	Porto Alegre	Rio Grande do Sul	6th	Olímpico	1981, 1996
Internacional	Porto Alegre	Rio Grande do Sul	11th	Beira-Rio	1975, 1976, 1979
Ipatinga	Ipatinga	Minas Gerais	Série B Runners-up	Ipatingão	none
Náutico	Recife	Pernambuco	15th	Aflitos	none
Palmeiras	São Paulo	São Paulo	7th	Palestra Itália	1972, 1973, 1993, 1994
Portuguesa	São Paulo	São Paulo	Série B 3rd place	Canindé	none
Santos	Santos	São Paulo	Runners-up	Vila Belmiro	2002, 2004
São Paulo	São Paulo	São Paulo	Champions	Morumbi	1977, 1986, 1991, 2006, 2007
Sport	Recife	Pernambuco	14th	Ilha do Retiro	1987
Vasco	Rio de Janeiro	Rio de Janeiro	10th	São Januário	1974, 1989, 1997, 2000
Vitória	Salvador	Bahia	Série B 4th place	Barradão	none

=== Personnel and kits ===
Team	Manager	Kit manufacturer	Main sponsor
Atlético Mineiro	Marcelo Oliveira	Lotto	Fiat
Atlético Paranaense	Geninho	Umbro	caparanaense.com
Botafogo	Ney Franco	Kappa	Liquigás
Coritiba	Dorival Júnior	Lotto	Computadores Positivo
Cruzeiro	Adilson Batista	Puma	Construtora Tenda
Figueirense	Mario Sérgio	Umbro	Taschibra
Flamengo	Caio Júnior	Nike	Lubrax
Fluminense	René Simões	Adidas	Unimed
Goiás	Hélio dos Anjos	Lotto	Neo Química Genéricos
Grêmio	Celso Roth	Puma	Banrisul
Internacional	Tite	Reebok	Banrisul
Ipatinga	Enderson Moreira	Topper	Usiminas
Náutico	Roberto Fernandes	Wilson	Rapidão Cometa
Palmeiras	Vanderlei Luxemburgo	Adidas	Fiat
Portuguesa	Estevam Soares	Champs / Penalty	Banif
Santos	Márcio Fernandes	Umbro	Semp Toshiba
São Paulo	Muricy Ramalho	Reebok	LG
Sport	Nelsinho Baptista	Lotto	Cimento Nassau
Vasco	Renato Gaúcho	Reebok	MRV Engenharia
Vitória	Vagner Mancini	Penalty	Fiat

== League table ==
Pos	Team	Pld	W	D	L	GF	GA	GD	Pts	Qualification or relegation
1	São Paulo	38	21	12	5	66	36	+30	75	Copa Libertadores 2009
2	Grêmio	38	21	9	8	59	35	+24	72	Copa Libertadores 2009
3	Cruzeiro	38	21	4	13	59	44	+15	67	Copa Libertadores 2009
4	Palmeiras	38	19	8	11	55	45	+10	65	Copa Libertadores 2009
5	Flamengo	38	18	10	10	67	48	+19	64	Copa Sudamericana 2009
6	Internacional	38	15	9	14	48	47	+1	54	Copa Sudamericana 2009
7	Botafogo	38	15	8	15	51	44	+7	53	Copa Sudamericana 2009
8	Goiás	38	14	11	13	57	47	+10	53	Copa Sudamericana 2009
9	Coritiba	38	14	11	13	55	48	+7	53	Copa Sudamericana 2009
10	Vitória	38	15	7	16	48	44	+4	52	Copa Sudamericana 2009
11	Sport	38	14	10	14	48	45	+3	52	Copa Libertadores 2009
12	Atlético Mineiro	38	12	12	14	50	61	−11	48	Copa Sudamericana 2009
13	Atlético Paranaense	38	12	9	17	45	54	−9	45	Copa Sudamericana 2009
14	Fluminense	38	11	12	15	49	48	+1	45	Copa Sudamericana 2009
15	Santos	38	11	12	15	44	53	−9	45	
16	Náutico	38	11	11	16	44	54	−10	44	
17	Figueirense	38	11	11	16	49	72	−23	44	Relegation to Série B
18	Vasco da Gama	38	11	7	20	56	72	−16	40	Relegation to Série B
19	Portuguesa	38	9	11	18	48	70	−22	38	Relegation to Série B
20	Ipatinga	38	9	8	21	37	66	−29	35	Relegation to Série B

Source: rsssfbrasil.com
Rules for classification: 1) points; 2) goal difference; 3) number of goals scored.

== Top scorers ==
#	Player	Team	Goals
1	Kléber Pereira	Santos	21
2	Keirrison	Coritiba	20
2	Washington	Fluminense	20
4	Alex Mineiro	Palmeiras	19
5	Guilherme	Cruzeiro	18
6	Borges	São Paulo	15
7	Paulo Baier	Goiás	14
7	Nilmar	Internacional	14
7	Hugo	São Paulo	14
10	Edmundo	Vasco	13
10	Felipe	Náutico	13
