= 2006 São Paulo FC season =

São Paulo
2006 season
- Chairman: Juvenal Juvêncio
- Manager: Muricy Ramalho
- Campeonato Brasileiro: Champions (4th title)
- Copa Libertadores: Runners-up
- Recopa Sudamericana: Runners-up
- Campeonato Paulista: Runners-up
- Top goalscorer: League: Lenílson; Rogério Ceni (8 each); All: Rogério Ceni (16 goals)
- Highest home attendance: 71,456 ( v Internacional in the Copa Libertadores)
- Lowest home attendance: 4,420 ( v Guarani in the Campeonato Paulista)

The 2006 season was São Paulo's 77th season in the club's existence. São Paulo finished in the second position in the Campeonato Paulista, only one point behind the winners Santos. A year after winning the Copa Libertadores, São Paulo once again challenged for the cup, being defeated by Internacional in a second final between Brazilian teams in a row, having beaten Atlético Paranaense in the previous edition. São Paulo lost by 2–1 in the Morumbi and drew in 2–2 on away second leg, thus coming in second place. As the current champions of Copa Libertadores, São Paulo played the Recopa Sudamericana versus Boca Juniors and was defeated by 4–3 on aggregate. Tricolor won the Campeonato Brasileiro fifteen years after their last title, in 1991 and became national champions for the fourth time, securing the title in 36th matchweek against Atlético Paranaense in the Morumbi with a 1–1 draw.

== Squad ==
- Final squad

Note: Flags indicate national team as defined under FIFA eligibility rules; some limited exceptions apply. Players may hold more than one non-FIFA nationality.

No.	Pos.	Nation	Player
1	GK	BRA	Rogério Ceni
22	GK	BRA	Bosco
24	GK	BRA	Mateus
3	DF	BRA	Fabão
5	DF	BRA	Miranda
4	DF	BRA	Edcarlos
31	DF	BRA	Alex Silva
25	DF	BRA	Alex Bruno
2	DF	BRA	André Dias
36	DF	BRA	Carlinhos
6	DF	BRA	Júnior
16	DF	BRA	Ilsinho
27	DF	ECU	Néicer Reasco
33	DF	BRA	Lúcio

No.	Pos.	Nation	Player
7	MF	BRA	Mineiro
8	MF	BRA	Josué
13	MF	BRA	Ramalho
20	MF	BRA	Richarlyson
10	MF	BRA	Danilo
18	MF	BRA	Rodrigo Fabri
21	MF	BRA	Souza
23	MF	BRA	Lenílson
9	FW	BRA	Leandro
11	FW	BRA	Alex Dias
14	FW	BRA	Aloísio
19	FW	BRA	Thiago Ribeiro
28	FW	BRA	Tadeu
29	FW	BRA	Edgar

=== Scorers ===
Position	Nation	Playing position	Name	Campeonato Paulista	Copa Libertadores	Campeonato Brasileiro	Recopa Sudamericana	Total
1	(Brazil)	GK	Rogério Ceni	5	3	8	0	16
2	(Brazil)	MF	Danilo	8	3	4	0	15
=	(Brazil)	FW	Thiago Ribeiro	10	1	3	1	15
3	(Brazil)	FW	Alex Dias	6	1	4	0	11
4	(Brazil)	FW	Aloísio	0	5	5	0	10
5	(Brazil)	MF	Lenílson	0	1	8	0	9
6	(Brazil)	DF	Fabão	2	2	4	0	8
=	(Brazil)	FW	Leandro	1	1	6	0	8
=	(Brazil)	MF	Mineiro	3	2	3	0	8
=	(Brazil)	MF	Souza	3	1	4	0	8
7	(Brazil)	FW	Ricardo Oliveira	0	1	5	0	6
8	(Brazil)	DF	Alex Silva	0	0	4	0	4
9	(Brazil)	DF	André Dias	2	0	1	0	3
=	(Brazil)	DF	Júnior	0	0	2	1	3
10	(Brazil)	DF	Edcarlos	0	2	0	0	2
=	(Brazil)	DF	Ilsinho	0	0	2	0	2
=	(Brazil)	MF	Richarlyson	1	0	1	0	2
=	(Brazil)	FW	Roger	2	0	0	0	2
11	(Brazil)	FW	Grafite	1	0	0	0	1
=	(Brazil)	MF	Josué	1	0	0	0	1
/	/	/	Own goals	0	0	2	1	3
			Total	45	23	66	3	138

=== Overall ===
Games played	73 (19 Campeonato Paulista, 14 Copa Libertadores, 38 Campeonato Brasileiro, 2 Recopa Sudamericana)
Games won	43 (13 Campeonato Paulista, 8 Copa Libertadores, 22 Campeonato Brasileiro, 0 Recopa Sudamericana)
Games drawn	18 (3 Campeonato Paulista, 2 Copa Libertadores, 12 Campeonato Brasileiro, 1 Recopa Sudamericana)
Games lost	12 (3 Campeonato Paulista, 4 Copa Libertadores, 4 Campeonato Brasileiro, 1 Recopa Sudamericana)
Goals scored	138
Goals conceded	70
Goal difference	+57
Best result	5–0 (A) v Portuguesa Santista – Campeonato Paulista – 2006.2.12; 5–0 (H) v Juventude – Campeonato Brasileiro – 2006.10.14
Worst result	0–4 (H) v Santos – Campeonato Brasileiro – 2006.7.30
Top scorer	Rogério Ceni (16 goals)

Source: São Paulo FC

== Official competitions ==
=== Campeonato Paulista ===
18 January Round 1	Santo André	1–0	São Paulo	Santo André
21:45 (UTC-3)	Túlio 53'	(Report) (pt)		Stadium: Bruno José Daniel; Attendance: 8,929; Referee: Otávio Corrêa da Silva

21 January Round 2	São Paulo	2–1	São Caetano	São Paulo
16:00 (UTC-3)	Grafite 6'; Mineiro 56'	(Report) (pt)	Dimba 7'	Stadium: Morumbi; Attendance: 8,307; Referee: José Henrique de Carvalho

25 January Round 3	São Paulo	0–1	Juventus	São Paulo
16:00 (UTC-3)		(Report) (pt)	Sérgio Lobo 73'	Stadium: Morumbi; Attendance: 15,477; Referee: Luiz Flávio de Oliveira

29 January Round 4	São Paulo	3–3	Guarani	São Paulo
18:10 (UTC-3)	Thiago 30'; Souza 46'; Roger 65'	(Report) (pt)	Bilu 20' (pen.); Rodrigo Sá 44'; Edmílson 84' (pen.)	Stadium: Morumbi; Attendance: 4,420; Referee: Marcelo Aparecido Ribeiro de Souza

1 February Round 5	Marília	0–2	São Paulo	Marília
21:45 (UTC-3)		(Report) (pt)	Júnior 28'; Roger 90'	Stadium: Bento de Abreu; Attendance: 13,257; Referee: Antônio Rogério Batista do Prado

5 February Round 6	São Paulo	4–2	Palmeiras	São Paulo
18:10 (UTC-3)	Danilo 45'; Thiago 69', 78'; Mineiro 90+1'	(Report) (pt)	Daniel 76'; Edmundo 89'	Stadium: Morumbi; Attendance: 30,570; Referee: Cléber Wellington Abade

9 February Round 7	São Paulo	3–1	Portuguesa	São Paulo
20:30 (UTC-3)	Alex Dias 1'; Danilo 13'; Josué 71'	(Report) (pt)	Cléber 60'	Stadium: Morumbi; Attendance: 10,877; Referee: Rodrigo Martins Cintra

12 February Round 8	Portuguesa Santista	0–5	São Paulo	Santos
16:00 (UTC-3)		(Report) (pt)	Thiago 19'; Danilo 34', 51'; Fabão 45'; Richarlyson 90+1'	Stadium: Vila Belmiro; Attendance: 9,349; Referee: Luís Marcelo Vicentin Cansian

15 February Round 9	Bragantino	3–3	São Paulo	Bragança Paulista
20:30 (UTC-3)	Dinélson 2'; Marcos Aurélio 46'; Adãozinho 79' (pen.)	(Report) (pt)	Danilo 17'; Thiago 69', 89'	Stadium: Marcelo Stéfani; Attendance: 6,375; Referee: Anselmo da Costa

18 February Round 10	São Paulo	5–1	Paulista	São Paulo
18:10 (UTC-3)	Danilo 12'; Souza 28'; Alex Dias 30', 73'; Rogério Ceni 69' (pen.)	(Report) (pt)	Nivaldo 26'	Stadium: Pacaembu; Attendance: 19,963; Referee: Élcio Paschoal Borborema

22 February Round 11	São Paulo	3–0	Mogi Mirim	São Caetano do Sul
20:30 (UTC-3)	Mineiro 52'; Souza 55'; Rogério Ceni 79' (pen.)	(Report) (pt)		Stadium: Anacleto Campanella; Attendance: 9,675; Referee: Paulo César de Oliveira

25 February Round 12	Ponte Preta	1–2	São Paulo	Campinas
18:10 (UTC-3)	Luiz Mário 64'	(Report) (pt)	Danilo 57'; André Dias 90+2'	Stadium: Moisés Lucarelli; Attendance: 7,331; Referee: Phillippe Lombard

5 March Round 13	São Bento	2–0	São Paulo	Sorocaba
18:10 (UTC-3)	André Leonel 20'; Celsinho 90+3'	(Report) (pt)		Stadium: Walter Ribeiro; Attendance: 12,797; Referee: José Henrique de Carvalho

12 March Round 14	Corinthians	1–2	São Paulo	São Paulo
16:00 (UTC-3)	Nilmar 76'	(Report) (pt)	Danilo 29'; André Dias 48'	Stadium: Morumbi; Attendance: 42,588; Referee: Sálvio Spinola Fagundes Filho

18 March Round 15	São Paulo	1–1	Noroeste	São Paulo
16:00 (UTC-3)	Thiago 55'	(Report) (pt)	Leandrinho 63'	Stadium: Morumbi; Attendance: 25,155; Referee: Luiz Flávio de Oliveira

26 March Round 16	Rio Branco	2–4	São Paulo	Americana
18:10 (UTC-3)	Fabiano Gadelha 31'; Nunes 42'	(Report) (pt)	Fabão 22'; Leandro 52'; Thiago 54'; Rogério Ceni 90+4' (pen.)	Stadium: Décio Vitta; Attendance: 8,431; Referee: Antônio Rogério Batista do Prado

29 March Round 17	São Paulo	2–0	América	São Paulo
20:30 (UTC-3)	Alex Dias 54', 69'	(Report) (pt)		Stadium: Morumbi; Attendance: 4,457; Referee: Luís Marcelo Vicentin Cansian

2 April Round 18	São Paulo	3–1	Santos	São Paulo
16:00 (UTC-3)	Rogério Ceni 45' (pen.); Thiago 72'; Alex Dias 90+2'	(Report) (pt)	Léo Lima 25' (pen.)	Stadium: Morumbi; Attendance: 51.520; Referee: Rodrigo Martins Cintra

9 April Round 19	Ituano	0–2	São Paulo	Mogi-Mirim
16:00 (UTC-3)		(Report) (pt)	Thiago 2'; Rogério Ceni 4'	Stadium: Papa João Paulo II; Attendance: 8,646; Referee: Élcio Paschoal Borborema

==== Record ====
Final Position	Points	Matches	Wins	Draws	Losses	Goals For	Goals Away	Win%
2nd	42	19	13	3	3	46	21	73%

=== Copa Libertadores ===
1 March Group 1	Caracas (Venezuela)	1–2	(Brazil) São Paulo	Caracas
21:00 (UTC-4:30)	Rey 83' (pen.)	(Report)	Danilo 36'; Aloísio 63'	Stadium: Estadio Brígido Iriarte; Attendance: 2,450; Referee: Albert Duarte (COL)

8 March Group 1	São Paulo (Brazil)	4–1	(Peru) Cienciano	São Paulo
(UTC-3)	Fabão 2'; Alex Dias 20'; Thiago 66'; Souza 76'	(Report)	Roberto Silva 30'	Stadium: Estádio do Morumbi; Referee: Martín Vázquez (URU)

21 March Group 1	Guadalajara (Mexico)	2–1	(Brazil) São Paulo	Guadalajara
20:30 (UTC-6)	Bautista 39'; Bravo 68'	(Report)	Danilo 25'	Stadium: Estadio Jalisco; Attendance: 21,512; Referee: Rubén Selman (CHI)

5 April Group 1	São Paulo (Brazil)	1–2	(Mexico) Guadalajara	São Paulo
21:45 (UTC-3)	Aloísio 32'	(Report)	Santana 44'; Martínez 79'	Stadium: Estádio do Morumbi; Attendance: 44,648; Referee: Daniel Gimenez (ARG)

12 April Group 1	Cienciano (Peru)	0–2	(Brazil) São Paulo	Cusco
19:45 (UTC-4)		(Report)	Aloísio 21'; Mineiro 42'	Stadium: Estadio Garcilaso; Referee: Carlos Torres (PAR)

20 April Group 1	São Paulo (Brazil)	2–0	(Venezuela) Caracas	São Paulo
22:00 (UTC-3)	Danilo 12'; Rogério Ceni 90+3'	(Report)		Stadium: Estádio do Morumbi; Attendance: 21,854; Referee: Jorge Larrionda (URU)

26 April Round of 16	Palmeiras (Brazil)	1–1	(Brazil) São Paulo	São Paulo
19:15 (UTC-3)	Edmundo 36' (pen.)	(Report)	Aloísio 23'	Stadium: Estádio Palestra Itália; Referee: Carlos Simon (BRA)

3 May Round of 16	São Paulo (Brazil)	2–1	(Brazil) Palmeiras	São Paulo
21:45 (UTC-3)	Aloísio 13'; Rogério Ceni 86' (pen.)	(Report)	Washington 58'	Stadium: Estádio do Morumbi; Attendance: 55,080; Referee: Wilson Mendonça (BRA)

10 May Quarterfinals	Estudiantes (Argentina)	1–0	(Brazil) São Paulo	Quilmes
21:45 (UTC-3)	Alayes 86'	(Report)		Stadium: Estadio Centenario; Attendance: 21,677; Referee: Rubén Selman (CHI)

19 July Quarterfinals	São Paulo (Brazil)	1–0 (4–3 p)	(Argentina) Estudiantes	São Paulo
21:45 (UTC-3)	Edcarlos 43'	(Report)		Stadium: Estádio do Morumbi; Attendance: 66,056; Referee: Carlos Chandía (CHI)
	Penalties
	Ricardo Oliveira (penalty scored); Rogério Ceni (penalty scored); Fabão (penalty scored); Danilo (penalty missed); Júnior (penalty scored)		(penalty scored) Calderón; (penalty scored) Cominges; (penalty scored) Lugüercio; (penalty missed) Alayes; (penalty missed) Carrusca

26 July Semifinals	Guadalajara (Mexico)	0–1	(Brazil) São Paulo	Guadalajara
20:00 (UTC-6)		(Report)	Rogério Ceni 84' (pen.)	Stadium: Estadio Jalisco; Attendance: 47,440; Referee: Jorge Larrionda (URU)

2 August Semifinals	São Paulo (Brazil)	3–0	(Mexico) Guadalajara	São Paulo
21:5 (UTC-3)	Leandro 32'; Mineiro 39'; Ricardo Oliveira 47'	(Report)		Stadium: Estádio do Morumbi; Attendance: 66,750; Referee: Daniel Giménez (ARG)

9 August Finals	São Paulo (Brazil)	1–2	(Brazil) Internacional	São Paulo
21:45 (UTC-3)	Edcarlos 75'	(Report)	Rafael Sóbis 53', 61'	Stadium: Estádio do Morumbi; Attendance: 71,456; Referee: Jorge Larrionda (URU)

16 August Finals	Internacional (Brazil)	2–2	(Brazil) São Paulo	Porto Alegre
22:00 (UTC-3)	Fernandão 29'; Tinga 66'	(Report)	Fabão 50'; Lenílson 85'	Stadium: Estádio Beira-Rio; Attendance: 55,000; Referee: Horacio Elizondo (ARG)

==== Record ====
Final Position	Points	Matches	Wins	Draws	Losses	Goals For	Goals Away	Win%
2nd	26	14	8	2	4	23	13	61%

=== Campeonato Brasileiro ===
16 April Round 1	São Paulo	1–0	Flamengo	São Paulo
16:00 (UTC-3)	Rogério Ceni 31' (pen.)	(Report) (pt)		Stadium: Morumbi; Attendance: 12,826; Referee: Paulo Henrique de Godoy Bezerra

23 April Round 2	Fortaleza	1–0	São Paulo	Fortaleza
18:10 (UTC-3)	Finazzi 19'	(Report) (pt)		Stadium: Castelão; Attendance: 19,751; Referee: Willian Marcelo Souza Neri

29 April Round 3	São Paulo	4–0	Santa Cruz	São Paulo
18:10 (UTC-3)	Danilo 48'; Mineiro 51'; Leandro 61'; Rogério Ceni 75'	(Report) (pt)		Stadium: Morumbi; Attendance: 9,561; Referee: Domingos de Jesus Viana Filho

7 May Round 4	Corinthians	1–3	São Paulo	São José do Rio Preto
16:00 (UTC-3)	Nilmar 21'	(Report) (pt)	Souza 39'; Alex Dias 69'; Lenílson 74'	Stadium: Teixeirão; Attendance: 20,857; Referee: Carlos Eugênio Simon

14 May Round 5	Internacional	3–1	São Paulo	Porto Alegre
16:00 (UTC-3)	Índio 13', 53'; Rafael Sóbis 60'	(Report) (pt)	Aloísio 47'	Stadium: Beira-Rio; Attendance: 28,474; Referee: Evandro Rogério Roman

20 May Round 6	São Paulo	1–0	São Caetano	São Paulo
18:10 (UTC-3)	Alex Dias 37'	(Report) (pt)		Stadium: Morumbi; Attendance: 12,602; Referee: Alício Pena Júnior

24 May Round 7	São Paulo	4–1	Palmeiras	São Paulo
20:30 (UTC-3)	Márcio Careca 5' (o.g.); Ricardo Oliveira 52', 56'; Alex Dias 82'	(Report) (pt)	Márcio Careca 39'	Stadium: Morumbi; Attendance: 7,861; Referee: Carlos Eugênio Simon

28 May Round 8	Vasco da Gama	1–1	São Paulo	Rio de Janeiro
18:10 (UTC-3)	Ygor 54'	(Report) (pt)	Alex Dias 11'	Stadium: São Januário; Attendance: 3,301; Referee: Heber Roberto Lopes

31 May Round 9	São Paulo	1–0	Fluminense	São Paulo
21:45 (UTC-3)	Souza 45'	(Report) (pt)		Stadium: Morumbi; Attendance: 10,186; Referee: Evandro Rogério Roman

4 June Round 10	Juventude	1–1	São Paulo	Caxias do Sul
18:10 (UTC-3)	Éder Ceccon 83'	(Report) (pt)	Júnior 89'	Stadium: Alfredo Jaconi; Attendance: 3,918; Referee: Lourival Dias Lima Filho

12 July Round 11	São Paulo	2–1	Grêmio	São Paulo
20:30 (UTC-3)	Ricardo Oliveira 18', 55'	(Report) (pt)	Alex 8' (o.g.)	Stadium: Morumbi; Attendance: 8,115; Referee: Alvaro Azeredo Quelhas

15 July Round 12	São Paulo	2–1	Figueirense	São Paulo
18:10 (UTC-3)	Ricardo Oliveira 2'; André Dias 90+1'	(Report) (pt)	Tiago Prado 59'	Stadium: Morumbi; Attendance: 13,947; Referee: Heber Roberto Lopes

23 July Round 13	Ponte Preta	1–3	São Paulo	Campinas
16:00 (UTC-3)	Tuto 12'	(Report) (pt)	Lenílson 41', 72'; Alex Silva 52'	Stadium: Moisés Lucarelli; Attendance: 6,147; Referee: Wagner Tardelli Azevedo

30 July Round 14	São Paulo	0–4	Santos	São Paulo
16:00 (UTC-3)		(Report) (pt)	Fabiano 41', 43'; Dênis 54'; Rodrigo Tiuí 72'	Stadium: Morumbi; Attendance: 10,855; Referee: Leonardo Gaciba da Silva

6 August Round 15	Botafogo	1–1	São Paulo	Volta Redonda
16:00 (UTC-3)	Felipe Adão 9'	(Report) (pt)	Thiago 50'	Stadium: Raulino de Oliveira; Attendance: 4,298; Referee: Carlos Eugênio Simon

13 August Round 16	São Paulo	2–1	Goiás	São Paulo
18:10 (UTC-3)	Lenílson 18', 73'	(Report) (pt)	Johnson 90'	Stadium: Morumbi; Attendance: 14,812; Referee: Luis Antônio Silva Santos

20 August Round 17	Cruzeiro	2–2	São Paulo	Belo Horizonte
16:00 (UTC-3)	Alex Silva 7' (o.g.); Michel 35'	(Report) (pt)	Rogério Ceni 42', 60' (pen.)	Stadium: Mineirão; Attendance: 12,557; Referee: Leonardo Gaciba da Silva

24 August Round 18	São Paulo	3–2	Paraná	São Paulo
20:30 (UTC-3)	Aloísio 6'; Leandro 67'; Alex Silva 76'	(Report) (pt)	Beto 5'; Leonardo 21'	Stadium: Morumbi; Attendance: 11,322; Referee: Clever Assunção Camilo

27 August Round 19	Flamengo	1–1	São Paulo	Rio de Janeiro
16:00 (UTC-3)	Juan 33'	(Report) (pt)	Lenílson 66'	Stadium: Maracanã; Attendance: 15,337; Referee: Carlos Eugênio Simon

31 August Round 20	São Paulo	1–1	Fortaleza	São Paulo
20:30 (UTC-3)	Lenílson 88'	(Report) (pt)	Rinaldo 87'	Stadium: Morumbi; Attendance: 9,605; Referee: Washington José Alves de Souza

3 September Round 21	Santa Cruz	1–3	São Paulo	Recife
18:10 (UTC-3)	Jorge Henrique 50'	(Report) (pt)	Rogério Ceni 25'; Thiago 79', 84'	Stadium: Arruda; Attendance: 16,730; Referee: Wagner Tardelli Azevedo

10 September Round 22	São Paulo	0–0	Corinthians	São Paulo
16:00 (UTC-3)		(Report) (pt)		Stadium: Morumbi; Attendance: 32,252; Referee: Heber Roberto Lopes

17 September Round 23	São Paulo	2–0	Internacional	São Paulo
16:00 (UTC-3)	Lenílson 53'; Júnior 71'	(Report) (pt)		Stadium: Morumbi; Attendance: 13,438; Referee: Evandro Rogério Roman

20 September Round 24	São Caetano	0–1	São Paulo	São Caetano do Sul
22:00 (UTC-3)		(Report) (pt)	Richarlyson 48'	Stadium: Anacleto Campanella; Attendance: 5,178; Referee: Sálvio Spinola Fagundes Filho

24 September Round 25	Palmeiras	3–1	São Paulo	Presidente Prudente
16:00 (UTC-3)	Nen 35'; Paulo Baier 83'; Marcinho 90+2'	(Report) (pt)	Souza 21'	Stadium: Prudentão; Attendance: 20,839; Referee: Cléber Welington Abade

30 September Round 26	Atlético Paranaense	0–0	São Paulo	Curitiba
16:00 (UTC-3)		(Report) (pt)		Stadium: Arena da Baixada; Attendance: 20,680; Referee: Clever Assunção Gonçalves

4 October Round 27	São Paulo	5–1	Vasco da Gama	São Paulo
22:00 (UTC-3)	Andrade 7' (o.g.); Danilo 15'; Fabão 33'; Miranda 48'; Rogério Ceni 63'	(Report) (pt)	Leandro Amaral 23'	Stadium: Morumbi; Attendance: 8,553; Referee: Sérgio da Silva Carvalho

7 October Round 28	Fluminense	1–2	São Paulo	Rio de Janeiro
18:10 (UTC-3)	Tuta 1'	(Report) (pt)	Aloísio 18'; Leandro 35'	Stadium: Maracanã; Attendance: 5,552; Referee: Heber Roberto Lopes

14 October Round 29	São Paulo	5–0	Juventude	São Paulo
18:10 (UTC-3)	Danilo 37'; Ilsinho 41'; Leandro 44'; Alex Silva 78'; Aloísio 87'	(Report) (pt)		Stadium: Morumbi; Attendance: 55,244; Referee: Evandro Rogério Roman

22 October Round 30	Grêmio	1–1	São Paulo	Porto Alegre
16:00 (UTC-3)	Hugo 49'	(Report) (pt)	Danilo 1'	Stadium: Olímpico; Attendance: 47,648; Referee: Heber Roberto Lopes

28 October Round 31	Figueirense	0–2	São Paulo	Florianópolis
16:00 (UTC-3)		(Report) (pt)	Aloísio 21'; Ilsinho 45+1'	Stadium: Orlando Scarpelli; Attendance: 16,365; Referee: Djalma José Beltrami Teixeira

2 November Round 32	São Paulo	1–1	Ponte Preta	São Paulo
20:30 (UTC-3)	Rogério Ceni 75' (pen.)	(Report) (pt)	Tuto 54'	Stadium: Morumbi; Attendance: 56,677; Referee: Rodrigo Martins Cintra

5 November Round 33	Santos	0–1	São Paulo	Santos
16:00 (UTC-3)		(Report) (pt)	Mineiro 29'	Stadium: Vila Belmiro; Attendance: 12,365; Referee: Paulo César Oliveira

9 November Round 34	São Paulo	3–0	Botafogo	São Paulo
20:30 (UTC-3)	Leandro 45+1', 90+3'; Souza 71'	(Report) (pt)		Stadium: Morumbi; Attendance: 33,917; Referee: Evandro Rogério Roman

12 November Round 35	Goiás	0–2	São Paulo	Goiânia
16:00 (UTC-3)		(Report) (pt)	Mineiro 9'; Fabão 17'	Stadium: Serra Dourada; Attendance: 41,745; Referee: Heber Roberto Lopes

19 November Round 36	São Paulo	1–1	Atlético Paranaense	São Paulo
16:00 (UTC-3)	Fabão 25'	(Report) (pt)	Cristian 79'	Stadium: Morumbi; Attendance: 68,237; Referee: Alicio Pena Júnior

26 November Round 37	São Paulo	2–0	Cruzeiro	São Paulo
16:00 (UTC-3)	Rogério Ceni 57'; Fabão 81'	(Report) (pt)		Stadium: Morumbi; Attendance: 45,154; Referee: Wagner Tardelli Azevedo

3 December Round 38	Paraná	0–0	São Paulo	Curitiba
16:00 (UTC-3)		(Report) (pt)		Stadium: Durival de Brito; Attendance: 14,862; Referee: Alicio Pena Júnior

==== Record ====
Final Position	Points	Matches	Wins	Draws	Losses	Goals For	Goals Away	Win%
1st	78	38	22	12	4	66	32	68%

=== Recopa Sudamericana ===
7 September Finals	Boca Juniors (Argentina)	2–1	(Brazil) São Paulo	Buenos Aires
22:00 (UTC-3)	Palacio 53', 63'	(Report)	Thiago 30'	Stadium: Estadio La Bombonera; Attendance: 35,426; Referee: Carlos Amarilla (PAR)

14 September Finals	São Paulo (Brazil)	2–2	(Argentina) Boca Juniors	São Paulo
22:00 (UTC-3)	Júnior 34'; Rodríguez 85' (o.g.)	(Report)	Palacio 40'; Palermo 75'	Stadium: Estádio do Morumbi; Attendance: 19,861; Referee: Óscar Ruiz (COL)

==== Record ====
Final Position	Points	Matches	Wins	Draws	Losses	Goals For	Goals Away	Win%
2nd	1	2	0	1	1	3	4	16%

== See also ==
- São Paulo Futebol Clube
