= 2006 Recopa Sudamericana =

- Event: Recopa Sudamericana
Boca Juniors	São Paulo
(Argentina)	(Brazil)
4	3
- (on aggregate)

First leg
Boca Juniors	São Paulo
2	1
- Date: September 7, 2006
- Venue: La Bombonera, Buenos Aires
- Referee: Carlos Amarilla (Paraguay)
- Attendance: 35,426

Second leg
São Paulo	Boca Juniors
2	2
- Date: September 14, 2006
- Venue: Estádio do Morumbi, São Paulo
- Referee: Óscar Julián Ruiz (Colombia)
- Attendance: 19,861

The 2006 Recopa Sudamericana (officially the 2006 Recopa Visa Sudamericana for sponsorship reasons) was the 14th Recopa Sudamericana, an annual football match between the winners of the previous season's Copa Libertadores and Copa Sudamericana competitions. This edition was played under a two-legged series after several editions played in neutral venues.

The match was contested by São Paulo, winners of the 2005 Copa Libertadores, and defending champions Boca Juniors, winners of the 2005 Copa Sudamericana and appearing in their third consecutive final. As both teams have won the competition twice before, this edition determined who will become the first tricampeón of the Recopa Sudamericana.

Boca Juniors successfully defend the title as they beat São Paulo 4–3 on aggregate to win their third Recopa trophy. The second leg was also the last match coached by Alfio Basile, who left the club. This victory also positioned Boca Juniors, momentarily, as the most lauded international club of the world.

== Qualified teams ==
Team	Previous finals app.
(Argentina) Boca Juniors	**1990**, 2004, **2005**
(Brazil) São Paulo	**1993**, **1994**

Bold indicates winning years

== Venues ==
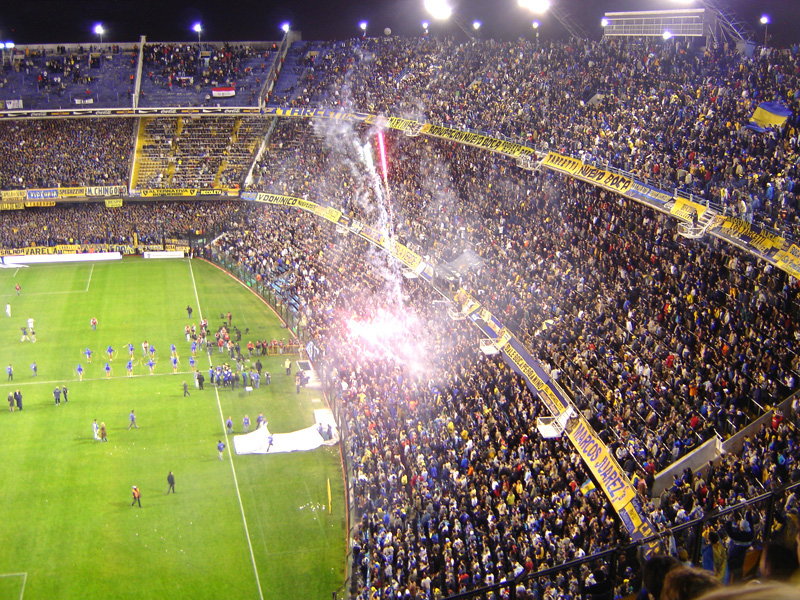
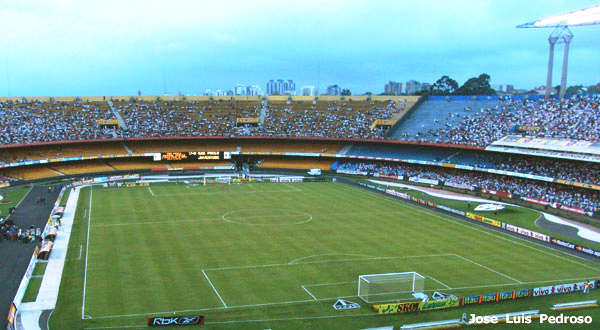
La Bombonera (left) and Estádio do Morumbi, venues of the series

== Matches ==
=== First leg ===
2006 Recopa Sudamericana
September 7, 2006
22:00 (UTC-3)
First leg

Boca Juniors (Argentina)	2–1	(Brazil) São Paulo
Palacio 53', 73'		Thiago 30'

Estadio Alberto J. Armando, Buenos Aires
Attendance: 35,426
Referee: Carlos Amarilla (Paraguay)

**Boca Juniors**	**São Paulo**

GK	1	(Paraguay) Aldo Bobadilla
DF	15	(Argentina) José María Calvo
DF	6	(Argentina) Daniel Díaz
DF	3	(Paraguay) Claudio Morel Rodríguez
DF	22	(Argentina) Juan Krupoviesa	(yellow card) 90'
MF	21	(Argentina) Sebastián Battaglia (C)		(substituted off) 46'
MF	5	(Argentina) Fernando Gago	(yellow card) 34'
MF	19	(Argentina) Neri Cardozo		(substituted off) 88'
MF	10	(Argentina) Guillermo Marino		(substituted off) 71'
FW	14	(Argentina) Rodrigo Palacio
FW	9	(Argentina) Martín Palermo
Substitutes:
MF	8	(Argentina) Pablo Ledesma	(yellow card) 62'	(substituted on) 46'
MF	23	(Argentina) Jesús Dátolo		(substituted on) 71'
FW	11	(Argentina) Andrés Franzoia		(substituted on) 88'
Manager:
(Argentina) Alfio Basile

GK	1	(Brazil) Rogério Ceni (C)
DF	2	(Brazil) Alex Silva
DF	3	(Brazil) Fabão
DF	4	(Brazil) Edcarlos	(yellow card) 44'
MF	7	(Brazil) Mineiro
MF	8	(Brazil) Josué		(substituted off) 85'
MF	10	(Brazil) Danilo
MF	23	(Brazil) Lenílson	(yellow card) 84'
MF	20	(Brazil) Richarlysson	(yellow card) 38'
FW	19	(Brazil) Thiago
FW	14	(Brazil) Aloísio		(substituted off) 34'
Substitutes:
FW	11	(Brazil) Alex Dias		(substituted on) 34'	(substituted off) 60'
MF	21	(Brazil) Souza		(substituted on) 60'
Manager:
(Brazil) Muricy Ramalho

Assistant referees:
(Paraguay) Amelio Andino
(Paraguay) Manuel Bernal

=== Second leg ===
September 14, 2006
22:00 (UTC-3)
Second leg

São Paulo (Brazil)	2–2	(Argentina) Boca Juniors
Júnior 34'; Morel Rodríguez 85' (o.g.)		Palacio 40'; Palermo 75'

Estádio do Morumbi, São Paulo
Attendance: 19,861
Referee: Óscar Ruiz (Colombia)

**São Paulo**	**Boca Juniors**

GK	1	(Brazil) Rogério Ceni (C)
DF	2	(Brazil) Alex Silva
DF	3	(Brazil) Fabão	(yellow card) 71'
DF	4	(Brazil) Edcarlos		(substituted off) 65'
MF	21	(Brazil) Souza		(substituted off) 84'
MF	7	(Brazil) Mineiro
MF	8	(Brazil) Josué
MF	10	(Brazil) Danilo
MF	6	(Brazil) Júnior
FW	19	(Brazil) Thiago	(yellow card) 22'
FW	23	(Brazil) Lenílson
Substitutes:
FW	11	(Brazil) Alex Dias		(substituted on) 65'
FW	16	(Brazil) Ilsinho		(substituted on) 84'
Manager:
(Brazil) Muricy Ramalho

GK	1	(Paraguay) Aldo Bobadilla
DF	4	(Argentina) Hugo Ibarra (C)
DF	6	(Argentina) Daniel Díaz	(yellow card) 20'
DF	3	(Paraguay) Claudio Morel Rodríguez
DF	22	(Argentina) Juan Krupoviesa
MF	8	(Argentina) Pablo Ledesma
MF	5	(Argentina) Fernando Gago
MF	19	(Argentina) Neri Cardozo	(yellow card) 50'	(substituted off) 81'
MF	10	(Argentina) Guillermo Marino		(substituted off) 46'
FW	14	(Argentina) Rodrigo Palacio		(substituted off) 91'
FW	9	(Argentina) Martín Palermo	(yellow card) 88'
Substitutes:
MF	23	(Argentina) Jesús Dátolo		(substituted on) 46'
MF	18	(Argentina) Jonathan Maidana		(substituted on) 81'
FW	11	(Argentina) Andrés Franzoia		(substituted on) 91'
Manager:
(Argentina) Alfio Basile

Assistant referees:
(Colombia) Eduardo Botero
(Colombia) José Navia
