= 2007 São Paulo FC season =

São Paulo
2007 season
- Chairman: Juvenal Juvêncio
- Manager: Muricy Ramalho
- Campeonato Brasileiro: Champions (5th title)
- Copa Libertadores: Round of 16
- Copa Sudamericana: Quarter-finals
- Campeonato Paulista: Semi-finals
- Top goalscorer: League: Borges, Dagoberto and Rogério Ceni (7); All: Borges (13)
- Highest home attendance: 69,989 ( v América-RN in the Campeonato Brasileiro)
- Lowest home attendance: 3,440 ( v Rio Branco in the Campeonato Paulista)
Home colours	Away colours

The 2007 season was São Paulo's 78th season of the club's existence. After being a national champions in the previous year, them team qualified to the Copa Libertadores and Copa Sudamericana. Tricolor took a place on the semifinals of Campeonato Paulista, but was eliminated by São Caetano with a rout in his home stadium in the second leg after drawing in 1–1 on away, was defeated by 4–1. In the Copa Libertadores for the fourth year's participation sequence, Tricolor was eliminated in Round of 16 losing to Grêmio in aggregated score. While played the Campeonato Brasileiro, São Paulo participated in Copa Sudamericana. With two draws against Figueirense the group advanced on away goal rule to Round 16 when eliminated the Argentine current champions of Copa Libertadores, Boca juniors, also in away goal rule, after scored one goal in La Bombonera in the loss by 2–1, Tricolor won in Morumbi with a single goal scored by Aloísio. However, in the quarterfinals was eliminated with two losses for Colombians Millonarios. Playing only the national league the club rising the fifth title in 31 October, on 34th round, behind the victory over América-RN for 3–0 in Morumbi. The team became a champions with a record of 23 wins, 8 draws, 7 losses and keeping the best defence of league, only 19 goals conceded in 38 matches.

== Undisputed champions ==
São Paulo FC reigned for the second time in the role as national champions, now with five titles. In the making of history São Paulo F.C. also broke many records, some of them set by São Paulo FC in the previous year.

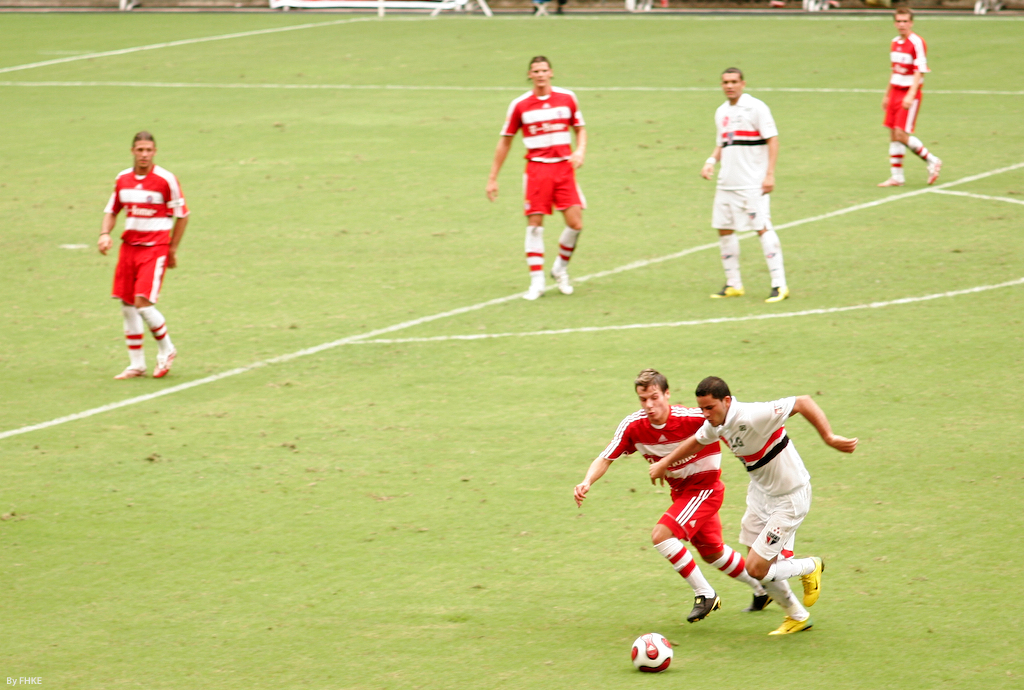
São Paulo playing a friendly match against Bayern Munich in Hong Kong

== Awards ==
CBF gave São Paulo F.C. a trophy created in the 70s, which was designed at the time for the team who reached five titles first or three consecutive titles. Since no team ever accomplished winning three titles consecutively, São Paulo was given the trophy for winning the tournament five times. The trophy, made out of silver soccer balls, was given to all the national champions in transition order until 1992, which was the season Flamengo FC celebrated their last national title. Due to the controversy of 1987, after 1992 CBF locked the most wanted trophy for all Brazilian teams and created a new trophy to be given to the national champions.

== Prestige ==
São Paulo FC was considered to be the best team in Brazil at this time by various soccer entities, and it was also considered the undisputed champion of 2007 by Placar (Brazilian monthly sports magazine), with four games left and 15 points in front of the second place team (Santos FC). São Paulo F.C. broke many records in 2007; the team went 13 games without losing in the tournament, São Paulo also didn't allow any goals for eleven games, having the best defense of the tournament. São Paulo F.C. finished the tournament with 19 goals scored against, another record set in the Brasileirao. The biggest record achieved that year, was that São Paulo broke its own record as a team to win the tournament before it was even over, the year before, São Paulo F.C. was mathematically crowned the champions with three games still left to play; in 2007 São Paulo F.C. won with four games left.

== Final squad ==
Note: Flags indicate national team as defined under FIFA eligibility rules; some limited exceptions apply. Players may hold more than one non-FIFA nationality.

No.	Pos.	Nation	Player
1	GK	BRA	Rogério Ceni (captain)
3	DF	BRA	André Dias
5	DF	BRA	Miranda
6	DF	BRA	Júnior
7	MF	BRA	Jorge Wagner
9	FW	BRA	Leandro
10	MF	BRA	Souza
11	MF	BRA	Hugo
12	DF	BRA	Danilo Silva
13	DF	ECU	Néicer Reasco
14	FW	BRA	Aloísio
15	DF	BRA	Alex Silva
16	DF	BRA	Jadílson

No.	Pos.	Nation	Player
17	FW	BRA	Borges
18	MF	BRA	Fernando
20	MF	BRA	Richarlyson
21	MF	BRA	Zé Luís
22	GK	BRA	Bosco
23	DF	BRA	Jackson
25	FW	BRA	Dagoberto
26	MF	BRA	Hernanes
29	MF	BRA	Sérgio Mota
30	MF	BRA	Francisco Alex
33	DF	BRA	Breno
34	FW	BRA	Diego Tardelli
40	GK	BRA	Fabiano

== Scorers ==
Position	Nation	Playing position	Name	Campeonato Paulista	Copa Libertadores	Campeonato Brasileiro	Copa Sudamericana	Others	Total
1	(Brazil)	FW	Borges	3	1	7	2	0	13
2	(Brazil)	FW	Aloísio	3	1	6	1	0	11
=	(Brazil)	MF	Hugo	7	1	3	0	0	11
3	(Brazil)	GK	Rogério Ceni	2	0	7	1	0	10
4	(Brazil)	FW	Leandro	3	1	4	0	0	8
5	(Brazil)	DF	Alex Silva	3	2	2	0	0	7
=	(Brazil)	FW	Dagoberto	0	0	7	0	0	7
6	(Brazil)	MF	Jorge Wagner	2	0	4	0	0	6
=	(Brazil)	MF	Richarlyson	3	1	2	0	0	6
=	(Brazil)	MF	Souza	3	1	2	0	0	6
7	(Brazil)	MF	Hernanes	1	0	3	1	0	5
=	(Brazil)	MF	Lenílson	5	0	0	0	0	5
8	(Brazil)	DF	Júnior	2	1	0	0	0	4
=	(Brazil)	DF	Miranda	0	2	2	0	0	4
9	(Brazil)	FW	Marcel	2	0	0	0	1	3
10	(Brazil)	DF	Breno	0	0	2	0	0	2
=	(Brazil)	DF	Ilsinho	2	0	0	0	0	2
=	(Brazil)	DF	Jadílson	1	1	0	0	0	2
11	(Brazil)	DF	André Dias	0	0	1	0	0	1
=	(Brazil)	FW	Diego Tardelli	0	0	1	0	0	1
=	(Brazil)	MF	Francisco Alex	0	0	1	0	0	1
=	(Brazil)	MF	Josué	1	0	0	0	0	1
/	/	/	Own goals	0	0	1	0	0	1
			Total	43	12	55	5	1	116

== Overall ==
Games played	74 (21 Campeonato Paulista, 8 Copa Libertadores, 38 Campeonato Brasileiro, 6 Copa Sudamericana, 1 Friendly match)
Games won	41 (13 Campeonato Paulista, 4 Copa Libertadores, 23 Campeonato Brasileiro, 1 Copa Sudamericana, 0 Friendly match)
Games drawn	18 (6 Campeonato Paulista, 2 Copa Libertadores, 8 Campeonato Brasileiro, 2 Copa Sudamericana, 0 Friendly match)
Games lost	15 (2 Campeonato Paulista, 2 Copa Libertadores, 7 Campeonato Brasileiro, 3 Copa Sudamericana, 1 Friendly match)
Goals scored	116
Goals conceded	52
Goal difference	+64
Best result	6–0 (H) v Paraná - Campeonato Brasileiro - 2007.9.1
Worst result	1–4 (A) v São Caetano - Campeonato Paulista - 2007.4.21
Top scorer	Borges (13 goals)

Source: São Paulo FC

== Friendlies ==
1 July International	Bayern Munich (Germany)	2–1	(Brazil) São Paulo	Hong Kong
	Klose 61'; Altıntop 76'	(Report) (pt)	Marcel 29'	Stadium: Hong Kong Stadium; Attendance: 13,906; Referee: Mike Riley (ENG)

=== Super Soccer Cup ===
27 January International	East Bengal FC (India)	0–3	(Brazil) São Paulo B	Siliguri
			Carlinhos; Jean; Paulo Matos	Stadium: Kanchenjunga Stadium

31 January International	Mohammedan SC (India)	0–6	(Brazil) São Paulo B	Jamshedpur
			Hernanes; Francisco Alex; Pablo; André	Stadium: JRD Tata Sports Complex

4 February International	Mohun Bagan (India)	0–2	(Brazil) São Paulo B	Kolkata
			Marco Antônio; Flávio Donizete	Stadium: Salt Lake Stadium

7 February International	Kerala XI (India)	0–3	(Brazil) São Paulo B	Kochi
			Marco Antônio; Hernanes; Chumbinho	Stadium: Jawaharlal Nehru Stadium

11 February International	JCT Mills FC (India)	0–3	(Brazil) São Paulo B	New Delhi
			Francisco Alex; Cazão	Stadium: Ambedkar Stadium

== Official competitions ==
=== Campeonato Paulista ===
18 January Round 1	Sertãozinho	1–3	São Paulo	Sertãozinho
20:30 (UTC-3)	Fabiano 75'	(Report) (pt)	Aloísio 29', 35'; Hugo 64'	Stadium: Estádio Frederico Dalmaso; Attendance: 13,906; Referee: José Henrique de Carvalho

21 January Round 2	São Paulo	1–0	Ituano	São Paulo
16:00 (UTC-3)	Júnior 59'	(Report) (pt)		Stadium: Estádio Cícero Pompeu de Toledo (Morumbi); Attendance: 10,298; Referee: Sálvio Spinola Fagundes Filho

24 January Round 3	Paulista	2–2	São Paulo	Jundiaí
21:45 (UTC-3)	Diogo 45'; Gláucio 90+4'	(Report) (pt)	Borges 45+1'; Hugo 54'	Stadium: Estádio Dr. Jayme Pinheiro de Ulhoa Cintra; Attendance: 9,616; Referee: Cléber Wellington Abade

28 January Round 4	Rio Claro	0–2	São Paulo	Rio Claro
16:00 (UTC-3)		(Report) (pt)	Aloísio 19'; Alex Silva 32'	Stadium: Estádio Augusto Schmidt Filho; Attendance: 9,419; Referee: Rodrigo Braghetto

1 February Round 5	São Paulo	1–1	Santo André	São Paulo
20:30 (UTC-3)	Alex Silva 85'	(Report) (pt)	Sandro Gaúcho 59'	Stadium: Estádio Cícero Pompeu de Toledo (Morumbi); Attendance: 9,665; Referee: Robério Pereira Pires

4 February Round 6	Noroeste	1–1	São Paulo	Bauru
18:10 (UTC-3)	Vandinho 77'	(Report) (pt)	Lenílson 56'	Stadium: Estádio Dr. Alfredo de Castilho; Attendance: 16,801; Referee: Paulo César de Oliveira

7 February Round 7	São Paulo	3–0	São Bento	São Paulo
21:45 (UTC-3)	Hugo 44'; Lenílson 56', 83'	(Report) (pt)		Stadium: Estádio Cícero Pompeu de Toledo (Morumbi); Attendance: 3,877; Referee: Marcelo Aparecido Ribeiro de Souza

11 February Round 8	São Paulo	3–1	Corinthians	São Paulo
16:00 (UTC-3)	Lenílson 30'; Rogério Ceni 44' (pen.); Leandro 58'	(Report) (pt)	Wilson 81'	Stadium: Estádio Cícero Pompeu de Toledo (Morumbi); Attendance: 32,653; Referee: Paulo César de Oliveira

17 February Round 9	América	2–4	São Paulo	São José do Rio Preto
18:10 (UTC-3)	Rafinha 68'; Adriano Peixe 90+2'	(Report) (pt)	Souza 20'; Hugo 35'; Josué 47'; Leandro 66'	Stadium: Estádio Benedito Teixeira (Teixeirão); Attendance: 9,616; Referee: Antônio Rogério Batista do Prado

25 February Round 10	São Paulo	1–0	Bragantino	São Paulo
18:10 (UTC-3)	Jadílson 30'	(Report) (pt)		Stadium: Estádio Cícero Pompeu de Toledo (Morumbi); Attendance: 8,996; Referee: Kléber José de Melo

3 March Round 11	Juventus	0–2	São Paulo	São Paulo
18:10 (UTC-3)		(Report) (pt)	Hugo 46'; Alex Silva 82'	Stadium: Estádio Municipal Paulo Machado de Carvalho (Pacaembu); Attendance: 12,950; Referee: Wilson Luiz Seneme

8 March Round 12	São Paulo	2–1	Guaratinguetá	São Paulo
20:30 (UTC-3)	Souza 63'; Marcel 84'	(Report) (pt)	Dinei 21'	Stadium: Estádio Cícero Pompeu de Toledo (Morumbi); Attendance: 6,491; Referee: Claudinei Forati Silva

11 March Round 13	Santos	1–1	São Paulo	Santos
16:00 (UTC-3)	Carlinhos 90+1'	(Report) (pt)	Ilsinho 30'	Stadium: Estádio Urbano Caldeira (Vila Belmiro); Attendance: 16,811; Referee: Antônio Rogério Batista do Prado

17 March Round 14	São Paulo	1–0	Ponte Preta	São Paulo
16:00 (UTC-3)	Hugo 25'	(Report) (pt)		Stadium: Estádio Cícero Pompeu de Toledo (Morumbi); Attendance: 10,998; Referee: José Henrique de Carvalho

25 March Round 15	São Caetano	1–0	São Paulo	São Caetano do Sul
16:00 (UTC-3)	Canindé 45'	(Report) (pt)		Stadium: Estádio Anacleto Campanella; Attendance: 9,067; Referee: Élcio Paschoal Borborema

28 March Round 16	São Paulo	4–0	Rio Branco	São Paulo
21:45 (UTC-3)	Leandro 6'; Marcel 30'; Souza 34'; Richarlyson 48'	(Report) (pt)		Stadium: Estádio Cícero Pompeu de Toledo (Morumbi); Attendance: 3,440; Referee: Christian Lopes de Oliveira

1 April Round 17	São Paulo	3–1	Palmeiras	São Paulo
16:00 (UTC-3)	Borges 5'; Rogério Ceni 44' (pen.); Richarlyson 67'	(Report) (pt)	Edmundo 29'	Stadium: Estádio Cícero Pompeu de Toledo (Morumbi); Attendance: 25,961; Referee: Wilson Luiz Seneme

8 April Round 18	Barueri	0–5	São Paulo	Sorocaba
18:10 (UTC-3)		(Report) (pt)	Richarlyson 3'; Lenílson 28'; Júnior 55'; Hernanes 58'; Jorge Wagner 75'	Stadium: Estádio Walter Ribeiro; Attendance: 5,503; Referee: Anselmo da Costa

11 April Round 19	São Paulo	2–2	Marília	Mogi Mirim
21:45 (UTC-3)	Borges 14'; Jorge Wagner 48'	(Report) (pt)	Wellington Amorim 22'; Wellington Silva 24'	Stadium: Estádio Papa João Paulo II; Attendance: 4,153; Referee: Leonardo Ferreira Lima

15 April Semifinals	São Caetano	1–1	São Paulo	São Paulo
16:00 (UTC-3)	Richarlyson 50' (o.g.)	(Report) (pt)	Hugo 29'	Stadium: Estádio Municipal Paulo Machado de Carvalho (Pacaembu); Attendance: 15,993; Referee: Paulo César de Oliveira

21 April Semifinals	São Paulo	1–4	São Caetano	São Paulo
18:10 (UTC-3)	Ilsinho 23'	(Report) (pt)	Luiz Henrique 37'; Thiago 53'; Glaydson 54'; Douglas 70'	Stadium: Estádio Cícero Pompeu de Toledo (Morumbi); Attendance: 44,554; Referee: José Henrique de Carvalho

==== Record ====
Final Position	Points	Matches	Wins	Draws	Losses	Goals For	Goals Away	Win%
3rd	45	21	13	6	2	43	19	71%

=== Copa Libertadores ===
14 February Group stage	Audax Italiano (Chile)	0–0	(Brazil) São Paulo	Santiago
20:45		(Report)		Stadium: Estadio San Carlos de Apoquindo; Attendance: 3,413; Referee: Roberto Silvera (URU)

28 February Group stage	São Paulo (Brazil)	4–0	(Peru) Alianza Lima	São Paulo
21:45 (UTC-3)	Alex Silva 14', 78'; Leandro 57'; Júnior 86'	(Report)		Stadium: Estádio Cícero Pompeu de Toledo (Morumbi); Attendance: 19,722; Referee: Sergio Pezzotta (ARG)

21 March Group stage	Necaxa (Mexico)	2–1	(Brazil) São Paulo	Aguascalientes
19:00	Kléber 62'; Salgueiro 69'	(Report)	Jadílson 42'	Stadium: Estadio Victoria; Attendance: 19,500; Referee: Sergio Pezzotta (ARG)

4 April Group stage	São Paulo (Brazil)	3–0	(Mexico) Necaxa	São Paulo
21:45 (UTC-3)	Souza 12'; Miranda 56'; Hugo 72'	(Report)		Stadium: Estádio Cícero Pompeu de Toledo (Morumbi); Attendance: 30,992; Referee: Héctor Baldassi (ARG)

18 April Group stage	Alianza Lima (Peru)	0–1	(Brazil) São Paulo	Lima
20:30		(Report)	Borges 45+1'	Stadium: Estadio Alejandro Villanueva; Attendance: 288; Referee: Alfredo Intriago (ECU)

25 April Group stage	São Paulo (Brazil)	2–2	(Chile) Audax Italiano	São Paulo
21:45 (UTC-3)	Richarlyson 7'; Aloísio 67'	(Report)	Di Santo 60'; Villanueva 72'	Stadium: Estádio Cícero Pompeu de Toledo (Morumbi); Attendance: 20,795; Referee: Carlos Amarilla (PAR)

2 May Round of 16	São Paulo (Brazil)	1–0	(Brazil) Grêmio	São Paulo
21:45 (UTC-3)	Miranda 56'	(Report)		Stadium: Estádio Cícero Pompeu de Toledo (Morumbi); Attendance: 33,387; Referee: Wagner Tardelli (BRA)

9 May Round of 16	Grêmio (Brazil)	2–0	(Brazil) São Paulo	Porto Alegre
21:45 (UTC-3)	Tcheco 17'; Diego Souza 74'	(Report)		Stadium: Estádio Olímpico Monumental; Attendance: 42,669; Referee: Carlos Chandía (CHI)

==== Record ====
Final Position	Points	Matches	Wins	Draws	Losses	Goals For	Goals Away	Win%
12th	14	8	4	2	2	12	6	58%

=== Campeonato Brasileiro ===
12 May Round 1	São Paulo	2–0	Goiás	São Paulo
18:10 (UTC-3)	Jorge Wagner 16'; Rogério Ceni 35' (pen.)	(Report) (pt)		Stadium: Estádio Cícero Pompeu de Toledo (Morumbi); Attendance: 0 Referee: Marcelo de Lima Henrique

20 May Round 2	Náutico	1–0	São Paulo	Recife
18:10 (UTC-3)	Acosta 78'	(Report) (pt)		Stadium: Estádio Eládio de Barros Carvalho (Aflitos); Attendance: 18,512; Referee: Washington Alves de Souza

27 May Round 3	São Paulo	0–0	Palmeiras	São Paulo
16:00 (UTC-3)		(Report) (pt)		Stadium: Estádio Cícero Pompeu de Toledo (Morumbi); Attendance: 20,873; Referee: Sálvio Spínola Fagundes Filho

3 June Round 4	Paraná	0–1	São Paulo	Curitiba
18:10 (UTC-3)		(Report) (pt)	Rogério Ceni 75' (pen.)	Stadium: Estádio Durival Britto e Silva (Vila Capanema); Attendance: 10,183; Referee: Leonardo Gaciba da Silva

10 June Round 5	São Paulo	0–1	Atlético Mineiro	São Paulo
18:10 (UTC-3)		(Report) (pt)	Paulo Henrique 82'	Stadium: Estádio Cícero Pompeu de Toledo (Morumbi); Attendance: 22,996; Referee: Sérgio da Silva Carvalho

17 June Round 6	São Paulo	2–0	Vasco da Gama	São Paulo
16:00 (UTC-3)	Borges 2', 23'	(Report) (pt)		Stadium: Estádio Cícero Pompeu de Toledo (Morumbi); Attendance: 9,065; Referee: Evandro Rogério Roman

24 June Round 7	Santos	0–2	São Paulo	Santos
16:00 (UTC-3)		(Report) (pt)	Aloísio 20'; Dagoberto 40'	Stadium: Estádio Urbano Caldeira (Vila Belmiro); Attendance: 8,073; Referee: Paulo César de Olivera

28 June Round 8	Figueirense	0–0	São Paulo	Florianópolis
20:30 (UTC-3)		(Report) (pt)		Stadium: Estádio Orlando Scarpelli; Attendance: 11,605; Referee: Luís Antônio Silva Santos

3 July Round 9	São Paulo	1–0	Internacional	São Paulo
20:30 (UTC-3)	Rogério Ceni 57' (pen.)	(Report) (pt)		Stadium: Estádio Cícero Pompeu de Toledo (Morumbi); Attendance: 11,423; Referee: Elvécio Zequetto

7 July Round 10	São Paulo	0–0	Flamengo	São Paulo
18:10 (UTC-3)		(Report) (pt)		Stadium: Estádio Cícero Pompeu de Toledo (Morumbi); Attendance: 17,027; Referee: Evandro Rogério Roman

14 July Round 11	Corinthians	1–1	São Paulo	São Paulo
20:30 (UTC-3)	Zelão 90+1'	(Report) (pt)	Dagoberto 82'	Stadium: Estádio Cícero Pompeu de Toledo (Morumbi); Attendance: 19,831; Referee: Paulo César de Oliveira

18 July Round 12	São Paulo	0–1	Fluminense	São Paulo
21:45 (UTC-3)		(Report) (pt)	Somália 53' (pen.)	Stadium: Estádio Cícero Pompeu de Toledo (Morumbi); Attendance: 5,072; Referee: Cléver Assunção Gonçalves

22 July Round 13	Cruzeiro	1–2	São Paulo	Belo Horizonte
16:00 (UTC-3)	Leandro Domingues 33'	(Report) (pt)	Breno 50'; Hernanes 70'	Stadium: Estádio Governador Magalhães Pinto (Mineirão); Attendance: 29,640; Referee: Evandro Rogério Roman

26 July Round 14	São Paulo	3–1	Sport	São Paulo
20:30 (UTC-3)	Leandro 48'; Souza 55'; Rogério Ceni 81'	(Report) (pt)	Weldon 30'	Stadium: Estádio Cícero Pompeu de Toledo (Morumbi); Attendance: 7,236; Referee: Leonardo Gaciba da Silva

29 July Round 15	América-RN	0–1	São Paulo	Natal
18:10 (UTC-3)		(Report) (pt)	Richarlyson 28'	Stadium: Estádio Dr. João Cláudio Vasconcelos Machado (Machadão); Attendance: 16,834; Referee: Luís Antônio Silva Santos

2 August Round 16	São Paulo	3–1	Juventude	São Paulo
20:30 (UTC-3)	Miranda 31'; Borges 76'; Hugo 82'	(Report) (pt)	Luciano 2'	Stadium: Estádio Cícero Pompeu de Toledo (Morumbi); Attendance: 7,177; Referee: Marcelo de Lima Henrique

5 August Round 17	Grêmio	0–2	São Paulo	Porto Alegre
18:10 (UTC-3)		(Report) (pt)	Borges 3'; Diego Tardelli 88'	Stadium: Estádio Olímpico Monumental; Attendance: 21,051; Referee: Héber Roberto Lopes

8 August Round 18	Botafogo	0–2	São Paulo	Rio de Janeiro
21:45 (UTC-3)		(Report) (pt)	Alex Silva 63'; Leandro 72'	Stadium: Estádio Jornalista Mário Filho (Maracanã); Attendance: 47,925; Referee: Carlos Eugênio Simon

11 August Round 19	São Paulo	2–0	Atlético Paranaense	São Paulo
18:10 (UTC-3)	Jorge Wagner 5'; Borges 54'	(Report) (pt)		Stadium: Estádio Cícero Pompeu de Toledo (Morumbi); Attendance: 36,520; Referee: Washington Alves de Souza

19 August Round 20	Goiás	0–0	São Paulo	Goiânia
18:10 (UTC-3)		(Report) (pt)		Stadium: Estádio do Governo do Estado de Goiás (Serra Dourada); Attendance: 30,110; Referee: Clever Assunção Gonçalves

26 August Round 21	São Paulo	5–0	Náutico	São Paulo
16:00 (UTC-3)	Dagoberto 56'; Rogério Ceni 64' (pen.); Hugo 72', 90'; Aloísio 74'	(Report) (pt)		Stadium: Estádio Cícero Pompeu de Toledo (Morumbi); Attendance: 40,029; Referee: Wagner Tardelli

29 August Round 22	Palmeiras	0–1	São Paulo	São Paulo
21:30 (UTC-3)		(Report) (pt)	Jorge Wagner 39'	Stadium: Estádio Palestra Itália (Parque Antarctica); Attendance: 16,124; Referee: Djalma José Beltrami

1 September Round 23	São Paulo	6–0	Paraná	São Paulo
18:10 (UTC-3)	Aloísio 27', 68'; Dagoberto 33', 62'; Souza 37'; Leandro 77'	(Report) (pt)		Stadium: Estádio Cícero Pompeu de Toledo (Morumbi); Attendance: 11,599; Referee: Elmo Resende Cunha

5 September Round 24	Atlético Mineiro	0–0	São Paulo	Belo Horizonte
21:45 (UTC-3)		(Report) (pt)		Stadium: Estádio Governador Magalhães Pinto (Mineirão); Attendance: 16,118; Referee: Paulo Henrique Bezerra

8 September Round 25	Vasco da Gama	0–2	São Paulo	Rio de Janeiro
16:00 (UTC-3)		(Report) (pt)	Dagoberto 61'; Hernanes 90+2'	Stadium: Estádio Vasco da Gama (São Januário); Attendance: 20,262; Referee: Carlos Eugênio Simon

15 September Round 26	São Paulo	2–1	Santos	São Paulo
18:10 (UTC-3)	Breno 49'; Borges 53'	(Report) (pt)	Rodrigo Tabata 90+2'	Stadium: Estádio Cícero Pompeu de Toledo (Morumbi); Attendance: 33,995; Referee: Sálvio Spínola Fagundes Filho

22 September Round 27	São Paulo	2–0	Figueirense	São Paulo
18:10 (UTC-3)	Alex Silva 14'; Leandro 29'	(Report) (pt)		Stadium: Estádio Cícero Pompeu de Toledo (Morumbi); Attendance: 43,847; Referee: Djalma José Beltrami

30 September Round 28	Internacional	1–2	São Paulo	Porto Alegre
16:00 (UTC-3)	Sorondo 21'	(Report) (pt)	Edinho 73' (o.g.); Borges 77'	Stadium: Estádio José Pinheiro Borda (Beira-Rio); Attendance: 33,105; Referee: Alício Pena Júnior

4 October Round 29	Flamengo	1–0	São Paulo	Rio de Janeiro
20:30 (UTC-3)	Ibson 49'	(Report) (pt)		Stadium: Estádio Jornalista Mário Filho (Maracanã); Attendance: 59,908; Referee: Sérgio da Silva Carvalho

7 October Round 30	São Paulo	0–1	Corinthians	São Paulo
16:00 (UTC-3)		(Report) (pt)	Betão 86'	Stadium: Estádio Cícero Pompeu de Toledo (Morumbi); Attendance: 38,325; Referee: Leonardo Gaciba da Silva

13 October Round 31	Fluminense	1–1	São Paulo	Rio de Janeiro
16:00 (UTC-3)	Thiago Neves 34' (pen.)	(Report) (pt)	André Dias 51'	Stadium: Estádio Jornalista Mário Filho (Maracanã); Attendance: 32,406; Referee: Ricardo Marques Ribeiro

21 October Round 32	São Paulo	1–0	Cruzeiro	São Paulo
16:00 (UTC-3)	Jorge Wagner 69'	(Report) (pt)		Stadium: Estádio Cícero Pompeu de Toledo (Morumbi); Attendance: 60,567; Referee: Sérgio da Silva Carvalho

28 October Round 33	Sport	1–2	São Paulo	Recife
16:00 (UTC-3)	Da Silva 64' (pen.)	(Report) (pt)	Rogério Ceni 25'; Aloísio 61'	Stadium: Estádio Adelmar da Costa Carvalho (Ilha do Retiro); Attendance: 35,259; Referee: Marcelo de Lima Henrique

31 October Round 34	São Paulo	3–0	América-RN	São Paulo
21:45 (UTC-3)	Hernanes 38'; Miranda 49'; Dagoberto 76'	(Report) (pt)		Stadium: Estádio Cícero Pompeu de Toledo (Morumbi); Attendance: 69,874; Referee: Lourival Lima Dias Filho

7 November Round 35	Juventude	2–0	São Paulo	Caxias do Sul
21:45 (UTC-3)	Renato Cajá 24'; Breno 66' (o.g.)	(Report) (pt)		Stadium: Estádio Alfredo Jaconi; Attendance: 11,244; Referee: Edílson Ramos da Mata

11 November Round 36	São Paulo	1–0	Grêmio	São Paulo
18:10 (UTC-3)	Rogério Ceni 51' (pen.)	(Report) (pt)		Stadium: Estádio Cícero Pompeu de Toledo (Morumbi); Attendance: 24,773; Referee: Wagner Tardelli

25 November Round 37	São Paulo	2–2	Botafogo	São Paulo
16:00 (UTC-3)	Aloísio 55'; Richarlyson 83'	(Report) (pt)	Lúcio Flávio 10'; Juninho 18'	Stadium: Estádio Cícero Pompeu de Toledo (Morumbi); Attendance: 30,530; Referee: Lourival Dias Lima Filho

2 December Round 38	Atlético Paranaense	2–1	São Paulo	Curitiba
16:00 (UTC-3)	Marcelo Ramos 11'; Antônio Carlos 90+3'	(Report) (pt)	Francisco Alex 82'	Stadium: Estádio Joaquim Américo Guimarães (Arena da Baixada); Attendance: 24,437; Referee: Leonardo Gaciba da Silva

==== Record ====
Final Position	Points	Matches	Wins	Draws	Losses	Goals For	Goals Away	Win%
1st	77	38	23	8	7	55	19	67%

=== Copa Sudamericana ===
15 August First stage	Figueirense (Brazil)	2–2	(Brazil) São Paulo	Florianópolis
(UTC-3)	Chicão 21' (pen.); Peter 39'		Rogério Ceni 25' (pen.); Hernanes 30'	Stadium: Estádio Orlando Scarpelli; Referee: Aristeu Tavares (BRA)

23 August First stage	São Paulo (Brazil)	1–1	(Brazil) Figueirense	São Paulo
(UTC-3)	Borges 80'		Jean Carlos 57'	Stadium: Estádio Cícero Pompeu de Toledo (Morumbi); Referee: Héber Roberto Lopes (BRA)

19 September Round of 16	Boca Juniors (Argentina)	2–1	(Brazil) São Paulo	Buenos Aires
21:45 (UTC-3)	Palermo 26', 83'		Borges 89'	Stadium: Estadio Alberto J. Armando (La Bombonera); Attendance: 24,790; Referee: Jorge Larrionda (URU)

26 September Round of 16	São Paulo (Brazil)	1–0	(Argentina) Boca Juniors	São Paulo
21:45 (UTC-3)	Aloísio 53'			Stadium: Estádio Cícero Pompeu de Toledo (Morumbi); Attendance: 45,906; Referee: Carlos Chandía (CHI)

10 October Quarterfinals	São Paulo (Brazil)	0–1	(Colombia) Millonarios	São Paulo
21:50 (UTC-3)			Zapata 84'	Stadium: Estádio Cícero Pompeu de Toledo (Morumbi); Attendance: 6,522; Referee: Sergio Pezzotta (ARG)

24 October Quarterfinals	Millonarios (Colombia)	2–0	(Brazil) São Paulo	Bogotá
18:50 (UTC-6)	Ciciliano 76', 85'			Stadium: Estadio Nemesio Camacho (El Campín); Attendance: 39,454; Referee: Martín Vásquez (URU)

==== Record ====
Final Position	Points	Matches	Wins	Draws	Losses	Goals For	Goals Away	Win%
7th	5	6	1	2	3	5	8	27%
