= Thiago Ribeiro =

Brazilian footballer

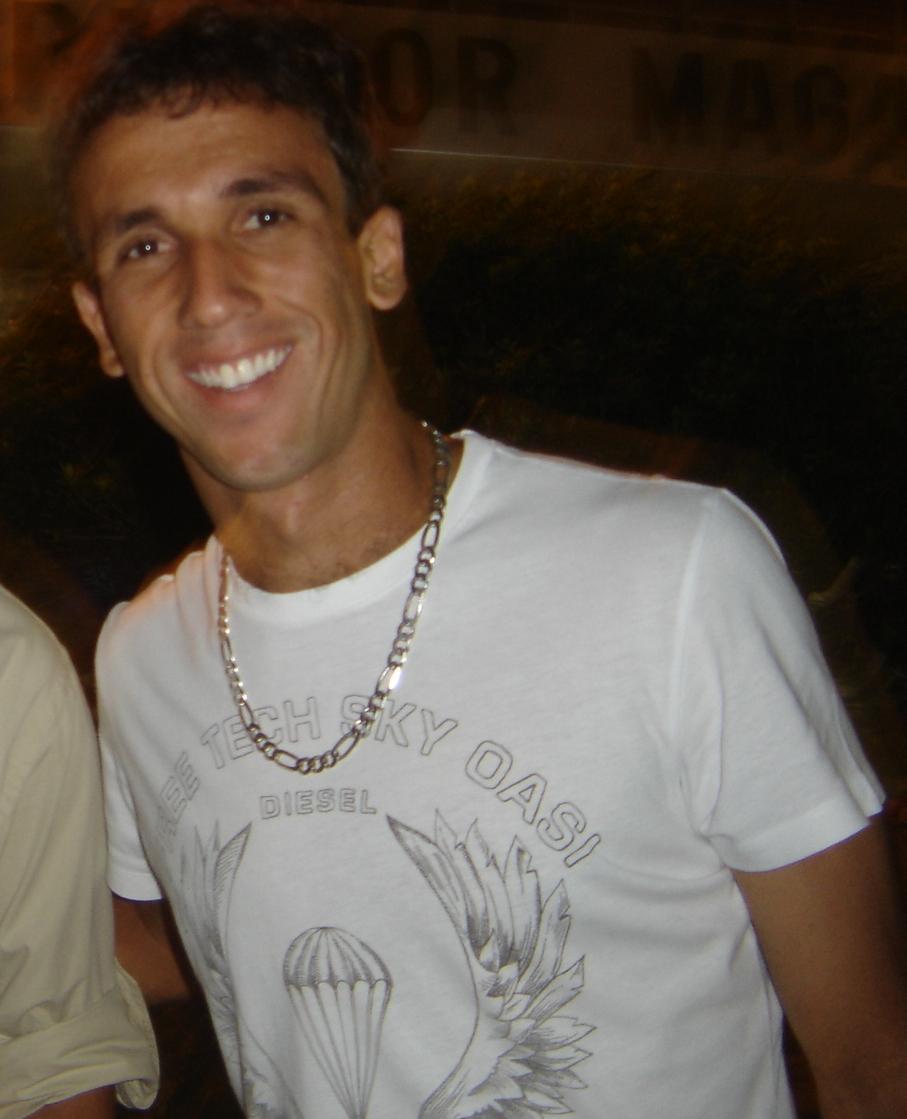

Personal information
- Full name: Thiago Ribeiro Cardoso
- Date of birth: 24 February 1986 (age 40)
- Place of birth: Pontes Gestal, Brazil
- Height: 1.84 m (6 ft 0 in)
- Position: Forward

Team information
- Current team: Catanduva

Youth career
- 2001–2003: Rio Branco-SP

Senior career*
Years	Team	Apps	(Gls)
2004–2005	Rio Branco-SP	5	(2)
2004–2005	→ Bordeaux (loan)	7	(0)
2005–2007	São Paulo	77	(19)
2007–2008	Rentistas	0	(0)
2007–2008	→ Al Rayyan (loan)	28	(8)
2008–2011	Cruzeiro	122	(32)
2011–2013	Cagliari	66	(10)
2013–2017	Santos	100	(22)
2015–2016	→ Atlético Mineiro (loan)	41	(10)
2016	→ Bahia (loan)	23	(2)
2018	Londrina	23	(3)
2019	Guarani	12	(2)
2019	Bragantino	20	(5)
2020	Novorizontino	5	(1)
2020–2021	Chapecoense	4	(0)
2022	Londrina	6	(0)
2023–	Catanduva	0	(0)
- * Club domestic league appearances and goals as of 00:12, 26 October 2023 (UTC)

Thiago Ribeiro Cardoso (born 24 February 1986), known as Thiago Ribeiro, is a Brazilian footballer who plays as a forward for Catanduva.

== Club career ==
=== Early career ===
Born in Pontes Gestal, São Paulo state, Thiago Ribeiro started his career at Rio Branco-SP. He played in five matches for the club during his debut year, notably scoring in a 2–1 Campeonato Paulista away loss against Corinthians on 24 January 2004.

Thiago Ribeiro was loaned to Ligue 1 side Bordeaux for 2004–05 season, along with Adonis Soares Pavani in June 2004. He made his debut in the category on 28 August, coming on as a late substitute for Juan Pablo Francia in a 2–0 home win against Sochaux.

=== São Paulo ===
On 29 July 2005 Thiago Ribeiro returned to his native state, signing for São Paulo. He made his debut for the club on 14 August, replacing Amoroso in a 3–2 home win against Fortaleza, and scored his first goal on 16 October in a 6–1 away routing of Flamengo.

On 19 November 2005, Thiago Ribeiro scored a hat-trick in a 4–2 home success over Figueirense. He was also included in the 2005 FIFA Club World Championship 23-man squad, but remained unused in both matches as his side was crowned champions.

Thiago Ribeiro was also Tricolor's top goalscorer in the 2006 Campeonato Paulista. However, he struggled to appear regularly during the following year and left the club.

=== Al Rayyan ===
Thiago Ribeiro was loaned to Al Rayyan in 2007 (the club also bought half of his rights), and scored a goal in 2007 AFC Champions League.

=== Cruzeiro ===
Thiago Ribeiro returned to Brazil on 29 August 2008, after agreeing to a five-year contract with Cruzeiro in the top tier. An investment group bought back the 50% economic rights for US$2 million for Cruzeiro.

Thiago Ribeiro made his debut for the club on 14 September 2008, starting in a 1–0 home loss against Palmeiras. His first goal came seven days later, in a 4–3 away win against Figueirense.

Thiago Ribeiro became top-scorer of 2010 Copa Libertadores with eight goals; highlights included a hat-trick in a 3–1 home win against Nacional on 30 April. On 24 October, he scored a brace in a 4–3 home loss against rivals Atlético Mineiro.

=== Cagliari ===
Thiago Ribeiro joined Cagliari from Rentistas for €3,353,500 with option to purchases. He made his Serie A debut on 11 September, starting in a 2–1 away win against Roma; his first goal came eight days later, in a home success over Novara for the same scoreline.

On 1 February 2012, Thiago Ribeiro scored a brace in a 4–3 home win against Roma. He ended the season as a starter, contributing with five goals in 35 matches as his side managed to avoid relegation.

On 3 July 2012 Cagliari bought Thiago Ribeiro outright for another €2,120,000. Cagliari had paid Rentistas a total of €5,473,500 for him.

=== Santos ===
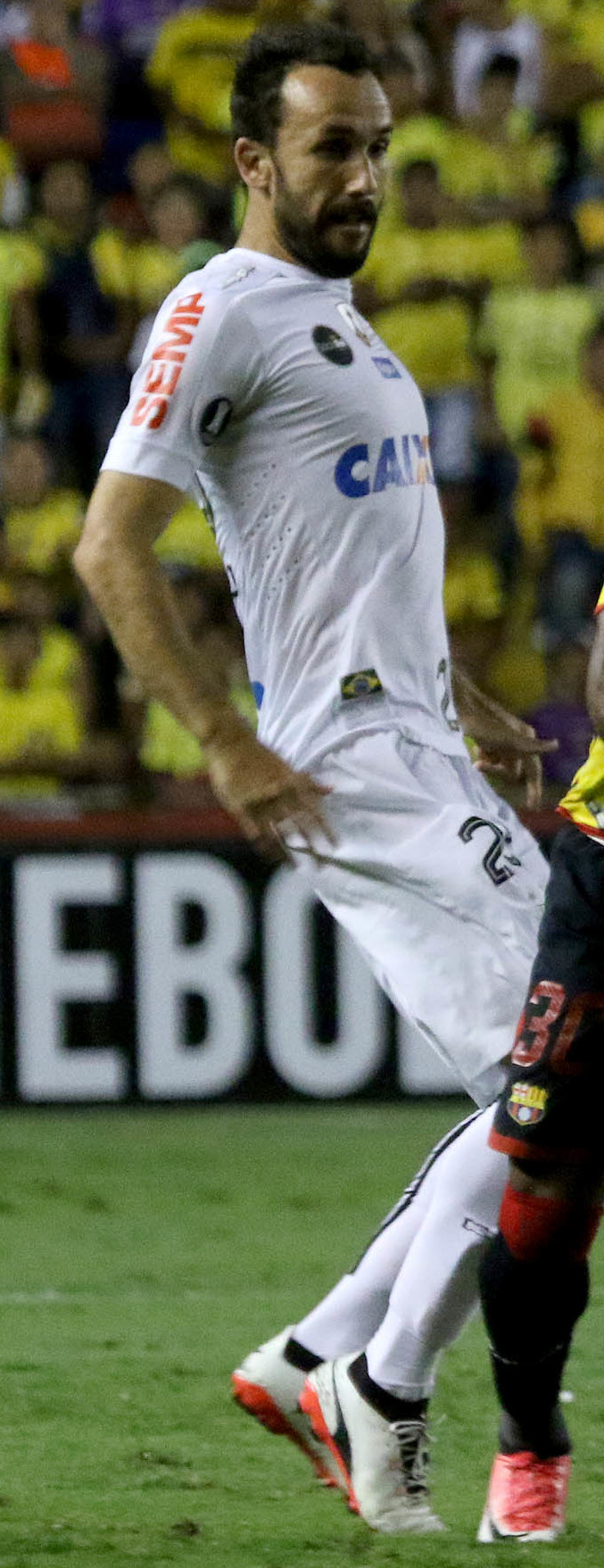
Thiago Ribeiro playing for Santos in 2017.

On 19 July 2013, Thiago Ribeiro returned to his country by signing a four-year deal with Santos, for a fee of €3,325,000 (R$ 10.814 million plus variables). He was assigned the number 11 jersey, previously held by Neymar, as the club was among a restructuration.

Thiago Ribeiro made his debut for the club on 11 August 2013, starting and scoring the first in a 2–1 away win against Internacional. A first-team regular, he ended the year with seven goals in 24 appearances.

Thiago Ribeiro remained as an undisputed starter the following campaign, scoring braces against Corinthians (5–1 home win) and Oeste (4–1 home win) and finishing the 2014 Campeonato Paulista with six goals. In May, however, struggled with several injuries during the year, being sidelined for more than three months.

Thiago Ribeiro was transfer listed by Peixe in February 2015, as the club was facing serious financial problems, mainly due to his high wages.

==== Atlético Mineiro (loan) ====
On 8 April 2015, Thiago Ribeiro was loaned to fellow league team Atlético Mineiro until May 2016. He quickly established himself as a starter, finishing the 2015 season with 36 appearances and nine goals, helping Atlético finish second in the year's Brasileirão.

In the 2016 pre-season, Thiago Ribeiro made two appearances in the Florida Cup, of which Atlético were crowned champions. He then picked up an injury and spent the next month recovering. In March, following the signings of Robinho and Hyuri, he fell down the pecking order and mutually terminated his loan contract with Atlético two months before its expiry.

==== Bahia (loan) ====
On 16 March 2016, Thiago Ribeiro was loaned to Série B club Bahia until the end of the year. He was separated from the squad in July, and later revealed that a depression issue had been affecting his performances since the end of 2014.

==== Return to Santos ====
Returning to Santos ahead of the 2017 campaign, Thiago Ribeiro played his first match on 3 February by replacing Jonathan Copete and scoring the last in a 6–2 home routing of Linense.

=== Guarani FC ===
Ribeiro signed with Guarani FC for the 2019 season.

=== Red Bull Bragantino ===
On 20 April 2019 Ribeiro signed for Red Bull Bragantino until December, for the 2019 Campeonato Brasileiro Série B season.

== Career statistics ==
As of 26 October 2023

Appearances and goals by club, season and competition
Club	Season	League			State League		Cup		Continental		Other		Total	
Club	Season	Division	Apps	Goals	Apps	Goals	Apps	Goals	Apps	Goals	Apps	Goals	Apps	Goals
Rio Branco-SP	2004	Série C	0	0	5	2	—		—		—		5	2
Bordeaux	2004–05	Ligue 1	7	0	—		0	0	—		—		7	0
São Paulo	2005	Série A	11	4	—		—		1 (Note: Appearance(s) in Copa Sudamericana)	0	—		12	4
São Paulo	2006	Série A	29	3	17	10	—		10 (Note: Appearance(s) in Copa Libertadores)	1	—		56	14
São Paulo	2007	Série A	0	0	6	0	—		0	0	—		6	0
São Paulo	Total		40	7	23	10	—		11	1	—		74	18
Al-Rayyan	2006–07	Qatar Stars League	8	1	—		—		6 (Note: Appearance(s) in AFC Champions League)	1	—		14	1
Al-Rayyan	2007–08	Qatar Stars League	20	7	—		—		—		—		20	7
Al-Rayyan	Total		28	8	—		—		6	1	—		34	9
Cruzeiro	2008	Série A	13	3	—		—		—		—		13	3
Cruzeiro	2009	Série A	30	8	6	0	—		9	1	—		45	9
Cruzeiro	2010	Série A	35	8	10	5	—		12	8	—		57	21
Cruzeiro	2011	Série A	7	1	12	8	—		6	4	—		25	13
Cruzeiro	Total		85	20	28	13	—		27	13	—		140	46
Cagliari	2011–12	Serie A	35	5	—		1	0	—		—		36	5
Cagliari	2012–13	Serie A	29	2	—		3	3	—		—		32	5
Cagliari	Total		64	7	—		4	3	—		—		68	10
Santos	2013	Série A	24	7	—		2	0	—		—		26	7
Santos	2014	Série A	21	4	17	6	4	1	—		—		42	11
Santos	2015	Série A	0	0	9	2	1	0	—		—		10	2
Santos	2017	Série A	10	0	7	2	2	0	3	0	—		22	2
Santos	Total		55	11	33	10	9	1	3	0	—		100	22
Atlético Mineiro (loan)	2015	Série A	33	9	3	1	—		2	0	—		38	10
Atlético Mineiro (loan)	2016	Série A	0	0	2	0	0	0	0	0	1 (Note: Appearance(s) in Primeira Liga)	0	3	0
Atlético Mineiro (loan)	Total		33	9	5	1	0	0	2	0	1	0	41	10
Bahia (loan)	2016	Série B	12	1	5	1	2	0	—		4 (Note: Appearance(s) in Copa do Nordeste)	0	23	2
Londrina	2018	Série B	23	3	—		—		—		—		23	3
Guarani	2019	Série B	—		11	2	1	0	—		—		12	2
Bragantino	2019	Série B	20	5	—		—		—		—		20	5
Novorizontino	2020	Série D	0	0	4	0	1	0	—		—		5	0
Chapecoense	2020	Série B	4	0	—		—		—		—		4	0
Chapecoense	2021	Série A	0	0	0	0	0	0	—		—		0	0
Chapecoense	Total		4	0	0	0	0	0	—		—		4	0
Londrina	2022	Série B	2	0	4	0	1	0	—		—		7	0
Democrata–SL	2023	Mineiro	—		6	0	—		—		—		6	0
Career total			373	71	122	39	18	4	49	15	5	0	567	129

== Honours ==
São Paulo

- FIFA Club World Cup: 2005
- Campeonato Brasileiro Série A: 2006

Cruzeiro

- Campeonato Mineiro: 2009, 2011

Atlético Mineiro

- Campeonato Mineiro: 2015

Bragantino

- Campeonato Brasileiro Série B: 2019

Individual

- Copa Libertadores top scorer: 2010
