= Fabão (footballer, born 1976) =

Brazilian footballer

Personal information
- Full name: José Fábio Alves Azevedo
- Date of birth: June 15, 1976 (age 50)
- Place of birth: Vera Cruz, Brazil
- Height: 1.87 m (6 ft 2 in)
- Position: Centre-back

Youth career
- 1994–1995: Paraná Clube

Senior career*
Years	Team	Apps	(Gls)
1996–1997	Bahia	19	(0)
1997–1999	Flamengo	24	(0)
2000–2001	Real Betis	16	(0)
2001	Córdoba CF	32	(1)
2001–2003	Goiás	57	(7)
2004–2006	São Paulo	90	(6)
2007	Kashima Antlers	12	(2)
2008–2009	Santos	40	(1)
2010	Guarani	26	(2)
2011	Henan Construction	29	(1)
2012	Comercial		
2013	Sobradinho		
- * Club domestic league appearances and goals

José Fábio Alves Azevedo (born June 15, 1976 in Vera Cruz), or simply Fabão, is a Brazilian centre back currently playing for Sobradinho.

== Club statistics ==
Club performance			League		Cup		League Cup		Total	
Season	Club	League	Apps	Goals	Apps	Goals	Apps	Goals	Apps	Goals
Brazil			League		Copa do Brasil		League Cup		Total	
1996	Bahia	Série A	0	0					0	0
1997	Bahia	Série A	18	0					18	0
1998	Bahia	Série B	0	0					0	0
1998	Flamengo	Série A	5	0					5	0
1999	Flamengo	Série A	17	0					17	0
2000	Flamengo	Série A	2	0					2	0
Spain			League		Copa del Rey		Copa de la Liga		Total	
2000/01	Real Betis	Segunda División	16	0					16	0
2001/02	Córdoba	Segunda División	32	1					32	1
Brazil			League		Copa do Brasil		League Cup		Total	
2002	Goiás	Série A	14	1					14	1
2003	Goiás	Série A	43	6					43	6
2004	São Paulo	Série A	38	1					38	1
2005	São Paulo	Série A	24	1					24	1
2006	São Paulo	Série A	28	4					28	4
Japan			League		Emperor's Cup		J.League Cup		Total	
2007	Kashima Antlers	J1 League	12	2	0	0	5	0	17	2
Brazil			League		Copa do Brasil		League Cup		Total	
2008	Santos	Série A	15	0					15	0
2009	Santos	Série A	25	1					25	1
2010	Guarani	Série A	26	2					26	2
Country	Brazil		204	13					204	13
Country	Spain		48	1					48	1
Country	Japan		12	2	0	0	5	0	17	2
Total			264	16	0	0	5	0	269	16

== Honors ==
=== Club ===
- FIFA Club World Cup: 2005
- Copa Libertadores: 2005
- Campeonato Brasileiro Série A: 2006
- J. League: 2007

=== Individual ===
- Campeonato Brasileiro Série A Team of the Year: 2006
