= Ilsinho =

Brazilian footballer (born 1985)

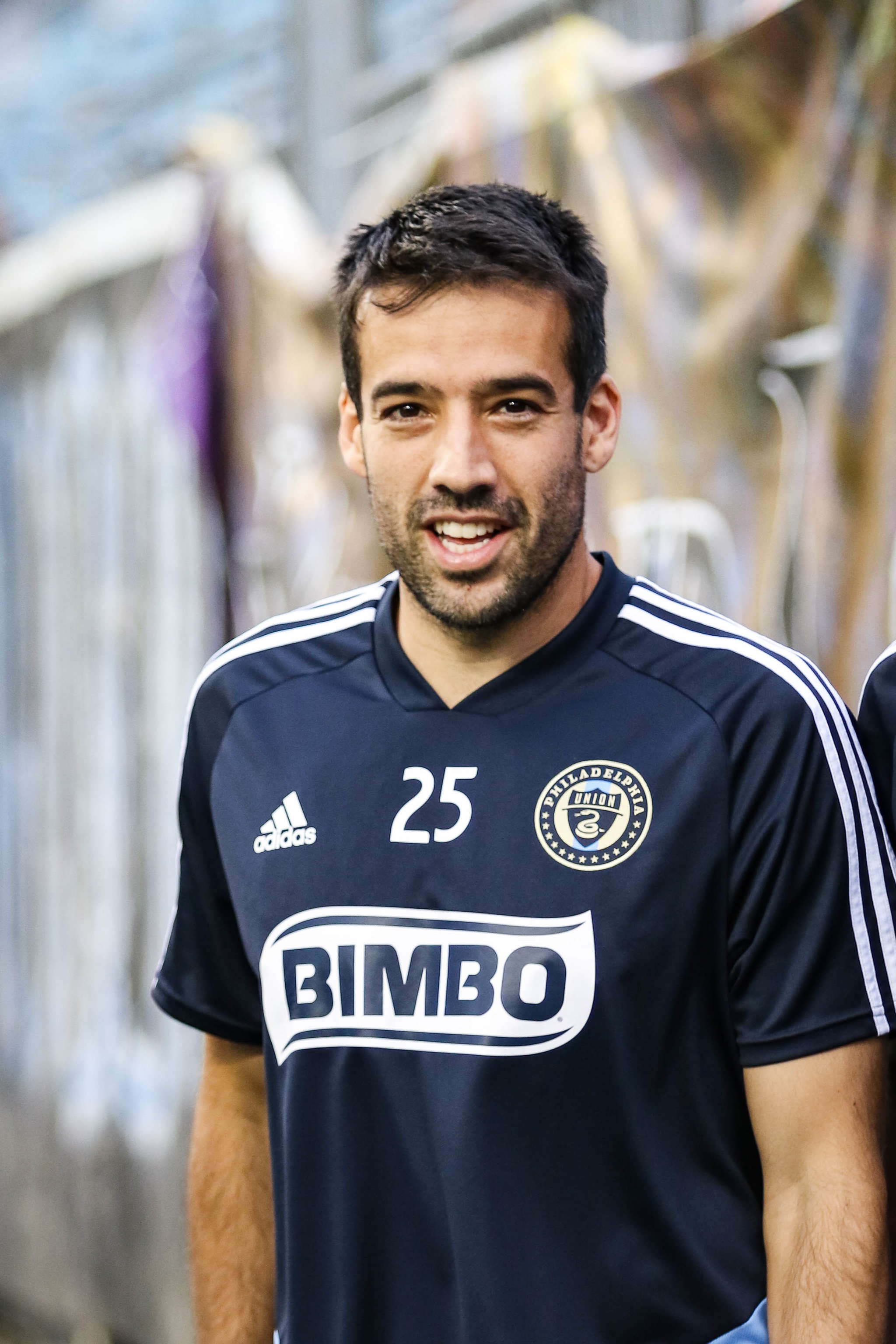
- Ilsinho with the Philadelphia Union in 2019

Personal information
- Full name: Ilson Pereira Dias Júnior
- Date of birth: 12 October 1985 (age 41)
- Place of birth: São Bernardo do Campo, Brazil
- Height: 1.78 m (5 ft 10 in)
- Positions: Right back; right midfielder

Youth career
- 2001–2005: Palmeiras

Senior career*
Years	Team	Apps	(Gls)
2006	Palmeiras	5	(0)
2006–2007	São Paulo	33	(2)
2007–2010	Shakhtar Donetsk	56	(10)
2010–2011	São Paulo	15	(2)
2011–2012	Internacional	11	(0)
2012–2015	Shakhtar Donetsk	53	(7)
2016–2021	Philadelphia Union	127	(21)
Total		300	(42)

International career
2008	Brazil U23	4	(0)
2007	Brazil	1	(0)
Medal record
Representing Brazil
Men's Football
Bronze medal – third place	2008 Beijing	Team competition
- * Club domestic league appearances and goals

Ilson Pereira Dias Júnior (born 12 October 1985), commonly known as Ilsinho (formerly Ilson, Jr.), is a Brazilian retired professional footballer who played as a right midfielder. He originally started his career as a right-back, but during his time at Shakhtar Donetsk, he was used as a winger, where he showed off his skill and speed.

Ilsinho began his career at Palmeiras in 2006 before signing for São Paulo later that year. He joined Shakhtar Donetsik in 2007, where he would notably win the UEFA Cup in the 2008–09 season. He returned to São Paulo in 2010 before joining Internacional the following year. In 2012, he returned to Shakhtar Donetsk. In 2016, Ilsinho signed for Philadelphia Union.

== Club career ==
=== Palmeiras and São Paulo ===
Ilsinho began his playing career in 2006 within his home state of São Paulo with Palmeiras playing right-back. Midway through the season, he signed for rivals São Paulo FC where he would spend the next two seasons, winning the 2006 and 2007 Brasileirões.

=== Shakhtar Donetsk ===
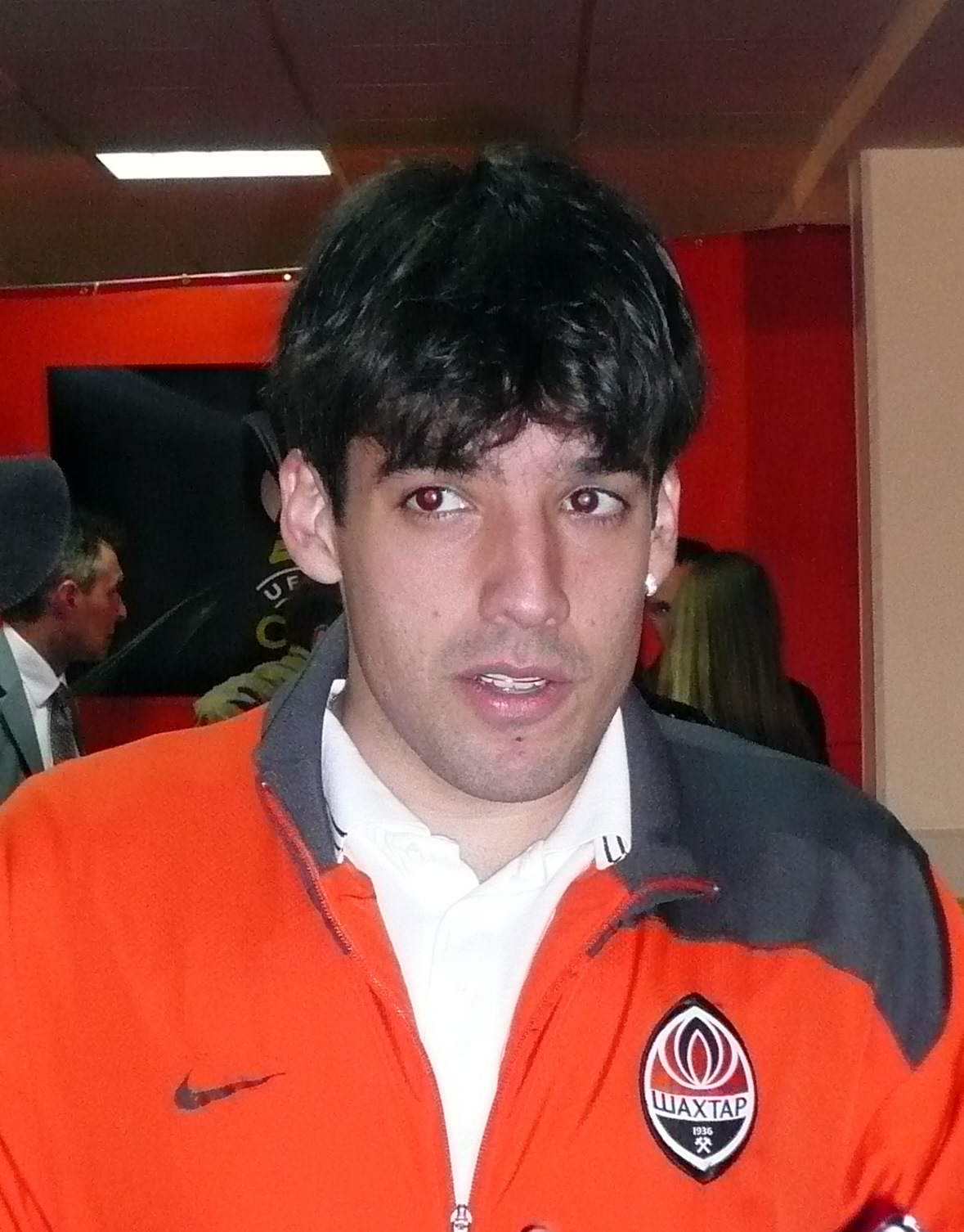
Ilsinho with FC Shakhtar Donetsk.

On 29 July 2007, it was announced that Ilsinho had completed a €10 million transfer to Ukrainian club Shakhtar Donetsk, signing a four-year contract with the club until 29 July 2011.

During his time in Donetsk, he became known for his dribbling skills and vision of the field. During the 2008–09 UEFA Champions League, he scored the opening goal in a group stage match against FC Barcelona; his first goal in the international club competition. Donetsk finished third in Group C standings resulting in a transfer to the final phase of the UEFA Cup.

Ilsinho was a key contributor to the UEFA Cup run when he scored a game-winning goal against Dynamo Kyiv, advancing Donetsk to the finals past their domestic rival. During the cup final, Ilsinho contributed 87 minutes to an ultimate extra victory against Werder Bremen, Donetsk's first European trophy.

=== Return to São Paulo ===
In August 2010, Ilsinho returned to his native Brazil, re-signing with his former club, São Paulo FC The return to São Paulo was held up initially due to Donetsk requiring a contract extension for an additional season, per the initial player contract agreement. The Court of Arbitration for Sport later awarded Donetsk eligible to receive compensation from Ilsinho for breach of contract for about €3.6 million.

=== Internacional ===
In August 2011, Ilsinho was released from São Paulo after being unable to resolve contract negotiations. Upon release, he signed with SC Internacional.

=== Return to Shakhtar Donetsk ===
Ilsinho rejoined Shakhtar in January 2012 on a three-and-a-half-year contract, accepting a much lower salary than his previous one with the club. He was assigned the number 77. His first appearance came in a 1–1 draw against Dnipro on 4 March 2012 coming on as a 64th-minute substitute for Alex Teixeira. His first start since returning to the club came in a 2–1 victory over Illichivets. He netted his first goal of his second spell with Shakhtar in a 4–0 win over Chornomorets Odesa He finished the season with 1 goal from 9 appearances, 7 of which came in the league.

The 2012–13 season started well with Ilsinho coming on as a substitute in the 2–0 Super Cup victory over Metalurh Donetsk. He scored a goal in his first two league matches, the first of which came in a 6–0 victory over Arsenal Kyiv, with the second coming against Hoverla in a 3–1 win. He scored a goal in a 2–0 win against Metalist Kharkiv on 7 October. On 19 October he netted the equalising goal in a 2–1 victory against Illichivets. He left Shakhtar Donetsk upon the completion of his contract on 30 June 2015.

=== Philadelphia Union ===
On 24 February 2016, the Philadelphia Union announced they had signed Ilsinho on a two-year deal. The first few seasons, Ilsinho struggled with fitness but found good offensive combinations with the Union's offense. Often deployed as a winger on the right flank, he would also spell as a central attacking midfielder as the Union were seeking at "volume #10" for their system.

During the 2019 season, Ilsinho was transitioned into a "super-sub" role and saw greater success with the Union Making only 7 starts from 28 appearances, the Union offensive performance was substantially different with Ilsinho on the field posting a +24 goal differential compared to a +7 with him on the bench. This offensive production, combined with a come-from-behind result against New York Red Bulls (dubbed "The Ilsinho Game", on 8 June 2019) earned Ilsinho the nickname "the cheatcode" in MLS circles. He finished the 2019 season with eight assists and five goals.

In January 2020, Ilsinho re-signed to a one-year contract with the Union. Following the 2021 season, Ilsinho's contract expired with Philadelphia. In March 2022, Ilsinho officially announced his retirement from professional football.

== International career ==
On 8 March 2007, Ilsinho was called up to the Brazil squad for the first time for two friendlies against Chile and Ghana. He made his international debut against Ghana on 27 March 2007 as the starting right-back. Brazilian legends Kaká, Ronaldinho, Robinho, and Júlio César were also in the starting lineup.

Ilsinho was also part of Brazil's squad for the 2008 Summer Olympics in which the team earned a Bronze medal after reaching third place. He made his debut as a substitute in Brazil 5–0 victory over New Zealand and later started in the 3–0 win over China.

== Personal life ==
Ilsinho holds a U.S. green card which qualifies him as a domestic player for MLS roster purposes.

== Career statistics ==
=== Club ===
Appearances and goals by club, season and competition
Club	Season	League		Cup		Continental		Other		Total	
Club	Season	Apps	Goals	Apps	Goals	Apps	Goals	Apps	Goals	Apps	Goals
Palmeiras	2006	5	0	—		—		—		5	0
São Paulo	2006	20	2	—		1	0	—		21	2
São Paulo	2007	13	0	—		6	0	8 (Note: Appearances in State League)	2	27	2
São Paulo	Total	33	2	0	0	7	0	8	2	48	4
Shakhtar Donetsk	2007–08	20	5	5	0	8	0	—		33	5
Shakhtar Donetsk	2008–09	13	1	2	1	11	2	1 (Note: Appearances in Super Cup)	0	27	4
Shakhtar Donetsk	2009–10	23	4	3	0	10	1	—		36	5
Shakhtar Donetsk	Total	56	10	10	1	29	3	1	0	96	14
São Paulo	2010	9	1	—		—		—		9	1
São Paulo	2011	6	1	5	1	—		14	2	25	4
São Paulo	Total	15	2	5	1	0	0	14	2	34	5
Internacional	2011	11	0	—		—		—		11	0
Shakhtar Donetsk	2011–12	7	1	2	0	—		—		9	1
Shakhtar Donetsk	2012–13	19	6	2	0	6	0	1	0	28	6
Shakhtar Donetsk	2013–14	13	0	4	1	4	0	0	0	21	1
Shakhtar Donetsk	2014–15	14	0	4	0	3	0	1	0	22	0
Shakhtar Donetsk	Total	53	7	12	1	13	0	2	0	80	8
Philadelphia Union	2016	25	2	3	0	—		1 (Note: Appearances in MLS play-offs)	0	29	2
Philadelphia Union	2017	27	6	0	0	—		—		27	6
Philadelphia Union	2018	23	6	1	0	—		1	0	25	6
Philadelphia Union	2019	28	5	1	0	—		2	0	31	5
Philadelphia Union	2020	19	2	—		—		1	0	20	2
Philadelphia Union	2021	5	0	—		1	0	—		6	0
Philadelphia Union	Total	127	21	5	0	1	0	5	0	138	21
Career total		300	42	32	3	50	3	30	4	412	52

== Honours ==
São Paulo

- Brazilian Série A: 2006

Shakhtar Donetsk

- UEFA Cup: 2008–09
- Ukrainian Premier League: 2007–08, 2009–10, 2011–12, 2012–13, 2013–14
- Ukrainian Cup: 2007–08, 2011–12, 2012–13
- Ukrainian Super Cup: 2008, 2012, 2014

Philadelphia Union

- Supporters' Shield: 2020

Brazil

- Summer Olympics Bronze medal winner: 2008

Individual

- Brazilian Bola de Prata (Placar): 2006
- Best XI Ukrainian Premier League: 2007–2008
