= Michel Gaúcho =

Brazilian footballer

Personal information
- Full name: Carlos Michel Lopes Vargas
- Date of birth: May 18, 1982 (age 44)
- Place of birth: Porto Alegre, Brazil
- Height: 1.75 m (5 ft 9 in)
- Position: Right back

Team information
- Current team: Cruzeiro

Youth career
- 1999–2002: São José

Senior career*
Years	Team	Apps	(Gls)
2002–2003	Internacional		
2003–2004	Ferro Carril Oeste		
2005	Cruzeiro	4	(0)
2005	Ipatinga (Loan)		
2006	América-MG (Loan)		
2006	Cruzeiro	15	(1)
2007	Juventude (Loan)	5	(0)
- * Club domestic league appearances and goals

Carlos Michel Lopes Vargas, or simply Michel Gaúcho (born May 18, 1982 in Porto Alegre) is a Brazilian right back currently playing for Juventude on loan from Cruzeiro.

== Honours ==
- Argentinian 3rd Division (2003/2004)

== Contract ==
- Juventude (Loan) 1 January 2007 to 31 December 2007
- Cruzeiro 1 January 2007 to 31 December 2007
