= Aloísio Chulapa =

Brazilian footballer (born 1975)

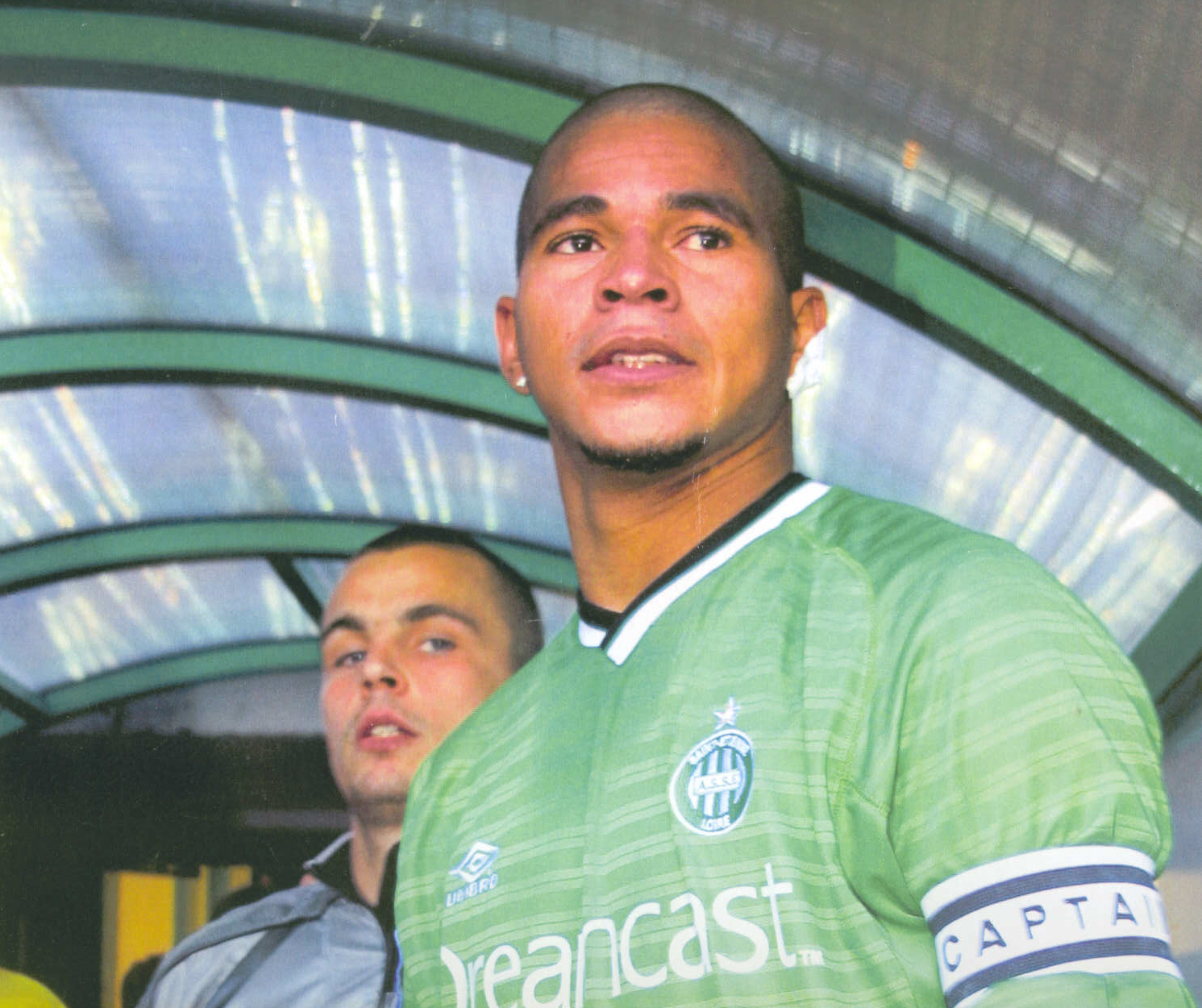
- Aloísio with Saint-Étienne

Personal information
- Full name: Aloísio José da Silva
- Date of birth: 27 January 1975 (age 51)
- Place of birth: Atalaia, Brazil
- Height: 1.88 m (6 ft 2 in)
- Position: Forward

Youth career
- 1992–1993: CRB

Senior career*
| Years | Team | Apps | (Gls) |
| 1994–1995 | Flamengo | 26 | (3) |
| 1996 | Guarani | 17 | (1) |
| 1997–1999 | Goiás | 36 | (6) |
| 1999–2001 | Saint-Étienne | 39 | (10) |
| 2001–2003 | Paris Saint-Germain | 54 | (14) |
| 2003–2005 | Rubin Kazan | 16 | (1) |
| 2005 | → Atlético Paranaense (loan) | 15 | (3) |
| 2005–2008 | São Paulo | 61 | (12) |
| 2008–2009 | Al-Rayyan | 25 | (8) |
| 2009 | Vasco da Gama | 12 | (0) |
| 2010 | Ceará | 3 | (0) |
| 2010 | Brasiliense | 25 | (6) |
| 2011 | Brusque | 14 | (3) |
| 2011–2012 | CRB | 29 | (4) |
| 2013 | Francana | 2 | (0) |
| 2013 | Gama | | |
| 2013 | Santa Rita | | |
| 2014 | União Barbarense | | |
| 2014 | Sport Atalaia | 1 | (0) |
| 2015 | Ipanema | | |
| 2015 | Grêmio Maringá | | |
| 2016 | Comercial-MS | 3 | (2) |
| 2016–2017 | Sete de Dourados | 1 | (0) |
- * Club domestic league appearances and goals

Aloísio José da Silva (born 27 January 1975), known as Aloísio Chulapa or just Aloísio, is a Brazilian former professional footballer who played as a forward, best known for his time at São Paulo.

== Career statistics ==
Appearances and goals by club, season and competition
| Club | Season | League | | | State League | | National cup (Note: Includes Coupe de France.) | | League cup (Note: Includes Coupe de la Ligue.) | | Total | |
| Club | Season | Division | Apps | Goals | Apps | Goals | Apps | Goals | Apps | Goals | Apps | Goals |
|---|---|---|---|---|---|---|---|---|---|---|---|---|
| Saint-Étienne | 1999–2000 | Ligue 1 | 29 | 8 | 2 | 0 | 1 | 0 | | | 32 | 8 |
| Saint-Étienne | 2000–2001 | Ligue 1 | 10 | 2 | 0 | 0 | 0 | 0 | | | 10 | 2 |
| Saint-Étienne | Total | | 39 | 10 | 2 | 0 | 1 | 0 | 0 | 0 | 42 | 10 |
| Vasco da Gama | 2009 | Série B | 12 | 0 | | | | | | | 12 | 0 |
| Ceará | 2010 | Série A | | | 2 (Note: Appearances in Campeonato Cearense) | 0 | | | | | | |
| Brasiliense | 2010 | Série B | 24 | 6 | | | | | | | 24 | 6 |
| Career total | | | 75 | 16 | 2 | 0 | 1 | 0 | 0 | 0 | 80 | 16 |

== Honours ==
Goiás

- Goiás State Championship: 1997, 1998, 1999

Paris Saint-Germain

- UEFA Intertoto Cup: 2001

Atlético Paranaense

- Paraná State Championship: 2005

São Paulo

- FIFA Club World Cup: 2005
- Campeonato Brasileiro Série A: 2006, 2007, 2008

Vasco da Gama

- Campeonato Brasileiro Série B: 2009

Individual

- Copa Libertadores top scorer: 2006
