= Júnior (footballer, born 1973) =

Brazilian footballer

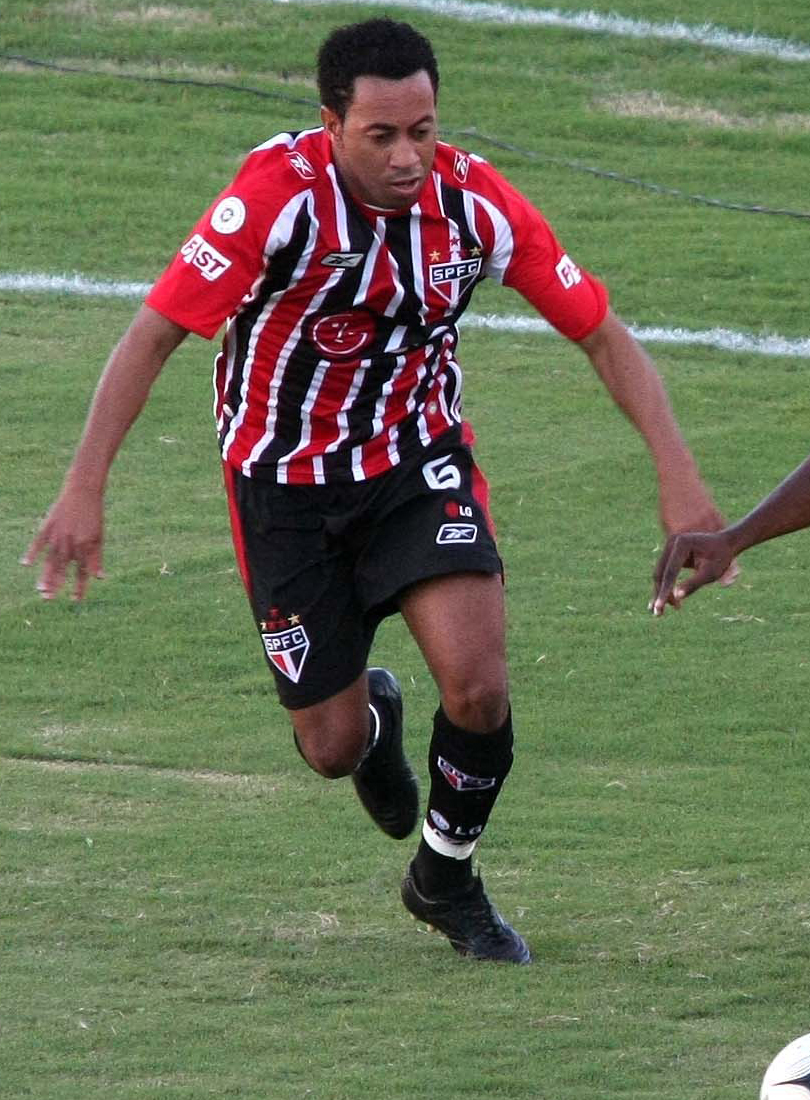
- Júnior playing for São Paulo in 2008

Personal information
- Full name: Jenílson Ângelo de Souza
- Date of birth: 20 June 1973 (age 53)
- Place of birth: Santo Antônio de Jesus, Brazil
- Height: 1.70 m (5 ft 7 in)
- Position: Left back

Youth career
- 1992–1994: Vitória

Senior career*
Years	Team	Apps	(Gls)
1994–1995	Vitória	18	(0)
1996–2000	Palmeiras	98	(3)
2000–2004	Parma	89	(3)
2003–2004	→ Siena (loan)	12	(0)
2004–2008	São Paulo	89	(4)
2009–2010	Atlético Minero	26	(3)
2010	Goiás	16	(1)
Total		348	(14)

International career
1996–2004	Brazil	19	(1)
Medal record
Men's Football
Representing Brazil
FIFA World Cup
Winner	2002 Korea/Japan
- * Club domestic league appearances and goals

Jenílson Ângelo de Souza (born 20 June 1973), usually known as Júnior, is a Brazilian former association footballer who played as a left back.

== Club career ==
Júnior spent his early years playing for Brazilian clubs Vitória and Palmeiras before moving to Italy and playing for Parma and Siena from 2000 to 2004. He spent his later career at Goiás, in the Brazilian Série A. During his time at Parma he won the 2001–02 Coppa Italia and scored the decisive goal in the second leg of the final which allowed Parma to defeat Juventus on away goals.

== International career ==
With the Brazil national football team, Júnior obtained nineteen international caps between 1996 and 2004, scoring one goal, which came against Costa Rica in the nation's victorious 2002 FIFA World Cup campaign. He was also previously a member of the Brazilian squads that took part at the 1998 CONCACAF Gold Cup and the 2001 Copa América.

== Career statistics ==
=== International ===
As of match played 19 November 2003.

Brazil national team
Year	Apps	Goals
1996	1	0
1998	5	0
2000	2	0
2001	3	0
2002	4	1
2003	4	0
Total	19	1

=== International goal ===
Júnior – goals for Brazil
#	Date	Venue	Opponent	Score	Result	Competition
1.	13 June 2002	Suwon World Cup Stadium, Suwon, South Korea	Costa Rica	2–5	2–5	2002 FIFA World Cup

== Honours ==
=== Club ===
Vitória

- Bahia State League: 1995

Palmeiras

- São Paulo State League: 1996
- Copa do Brasil: 1998
- Copa Mercosur: 1998
- Copa Libertadores: 1999
- Torneio Rio-São Paulo: 2000
- Brazilian Copa dos Campeões: 2000
- Intercontinental Cup runner-up: 1999

Parma

- Coppa Italia: 2001–02

São Paulo

- São Paulo State League: 2005
- Copa Libertadores: 2005
- FIFA Club World Cup: 2005
- Brazilian League: 2006, 2007, 2008

Atlético Mineiro

- Campeonato Mineiro: 2010

=== International ===
Brazil

- FIFA World Cup: 2002

=== Individual ===
- Brazilian Bola de Prata (Placar): 1998
