= Tiago Prado =

Brazilian footballer

Personal information
- Full name: Tiago Prado Nogueira
- Date of birth: 3 May 1984 (age 42)
- Place of birth: Rondonópolis, Brazil
- Height: 1.87 m (6 ft 2 in)
- Position: Defender

Youth career
- 2000–2004: Grêmio

Senior career*
Years	Team	Apps	(Gls)
2004–2005	Grêmio		
2006	Figueirense	29	(1)
2007	Kyoto Sanga FC	29	(3)
2008	Figueirense		
2009	→ Vila Nova-GO (loan)		
2009	Porto Alegre		
2010	Pelotas		
2010	Chengdu Blades	3	(0)
2011	Consadole Sapporo	7	(0)
- * Club domestic league appearances and goals as of 30 December 2010

Tiago Prado Nogueira (born 3 May 1984), or simply Tiago Prado, is a Brazilian football defender.

On 29 December 2010, Tiago signed a contract with Consadole Sapporo.

On 31 July 2011, Consadole Sapporo cancelled its contract.

== Club statistics ==
Club performance			League	
Season	Club	League	Apps	Goals
Brazil			League	
2004	Grêmio	Série A	20	1
2005	Grêmio	Série B		
2006	Figueirense	Série A	29	1
Japan			League	
2007	Kyoto Sanga FC	J2 League	29	3
2011	Consadole Sapporo	J2 League	7	0
Country	Brazil		49	2
Country	Japan		36	3
Total			85	5

== Honours ==
Grêmio

- Campeonato Brasileiro Série B: 2005

Figueirense

- Campeonato Catarinense: 2006

Porto Alegre

- Campeonato Gaúcho — Second Division: 2009
