= Mineiro (footballer, born 1975) =

Brazilian footballer

- Mineiro after a match for Hertha BSC in 2008

Personal information
- Full name: Carlos Luciano da Silva
- Date of birth: 2 August 1975 (age 51)
- Place of birth: Porto Alegre, Brazil
- Height: 1.70 m (5 ft 7 in)
- Position: Defensive midfielder

Youth career
- 1996–1997: Rio Branco

Senior career*
Years	Team	Apps	(Gls)
1997–1998	Guarani	24	(0)
1998–2003	Ponte Preta	104	(5)
2003–2004	São Caetano	80	(3)
2005–2007	São Paulo	57	(7)
2007–2008	Hertha BSC	36	(2)
2008–2009	Chelsea	1	(0)
2009–2010	Schalke 04	7	(0)
2011–2012	TuS Koblenz	30	(1)
Total		342	(18)

International career
2001–2008	Brazil	24	(0)
- * Club domestic league appearances and goals

Carlos Luciano da Silva (born 2 August 1975), nicknamed Mineiro, is a Brazilian former professional footballer who played as a defensive midfielder.

He began his career with Guarani, Ponte Preta and São Caetano, winning the Campeonato Paulista with the last of those clubs in 2004. He then moved to São Paulo, where he won the Campeonato Paulista, Copa Libertadores and FIFA Club World Championship in 2005, scoring the only goal of the latter final against Liverpool. He moved to Europe in 2007, playing for Hertha BSC and Schalke 04 in the Bundesliga, and making one appearance in the Premier League for Chelsea.

Mineiro played 24 games for Brazil between 2001 and 2008. He was part of the squads at the 2006 FIFA World Cup and 2007 Copa América, winning the latter.

== Club career ==
=== Early career ===
Mineiro was born in Porto Alegre, Rio Grande do Sul. Having not been taken on by Grêmio or Internacional, the two major teams of his home city, his agent Jorge Machado took him to the interior of São Paulo state to the youth team of Rio Branco in 1996. A year later, he began his professional career at Guarani.

In 1998, Mineiro joined Guarani's rivals Ponte Preta. With the team, he reached the knockout stages of the Campeonato Brasileiro Série A in 1999 and 2000; in the latter year, Placar magazine named him in the Bola de Prata team of the season. In 2001, the club reached the semi-finals of the Campeonato Paulista and Copa do Brasil.

Mineiro signed for São Caetano in 2003. He was part of the squad that won the 2004 Campeonato Paulista, the club's first state title, and scored in the 2–0 win over Paulista Futebol Clube in the second leg of the final (5–1 aggregate).

=== São Paulo ===
At the start of 2005, Mineiro signed for São Paulo on a two-year contract under Émerson Leão, who had given him his international debut. He won the Campeonato Paulista, as well as the Copa Libertadores and the FIFA Club World Championship in the same year. On 18 December 2005, he scored the only goal in the latter's final at International Stadium Yokohama in Japan, against European champions Liverpool. The team also won the 2006 Campeonato Brasileiro Série A.

=== Hertha BSC ===
Mineiro's contract at São Paulo expired at the start of 2007, and the club offered him a four-year deal with a salary of 150,000 Brazilian reais a week, as well as a career plan after he finished playing. On 31 January, transfer deadline day, he moved abroad for the first time and signed an 18-month deal with Hertha BSC of the German Bundesliga, where international teammate Gilberto was already playing.

On 3 February 2007, Mineiro made his Hertha debut against Hamburger SV. He was brought on for the last 20 minutes in place of Malik Fathi and scored the winning goal from over 25 yards in the last seconds of injury time, to win the game 2–1.

=== Chelsea ===
On 24 September 2008, it was announced that Mineiro had signed for Chelsea as a backup for the injured Michael Essien until the end of the 2008–09 season. He was signed by compatriot manager Luiz Felipe Scolari, who likened him to former Chelsea defensive midfielder Claude Makélélé. He made his Chelsea debut on 1 November against Sunderland, playing the last 15 minutes as a substitute for Nicolas Anelka who had already scored a hat-trick in a 5–0 victory.

Despite already having played for Chelsea he was not formally revealed to the press until 7 November during a press conference at Chelsea's training ground in Cobham, Surrey. During the press conference it was confirmed that Mineiro was on a contract to play as Chelsea's third-choice defensive midfielder, behind Essien and Mikel John Obi. Mineiro played just twice for Chelsea, and his only start was against Burnley in the League Cup fourth round on 12 November, a 1–1 draw and defeat on penalties.

=== Schalke 04 ===
On 11 August 2009, Mineiro returned to Germany for the medical check and later signed with Schalke 04. He made his Schalke debut on 16 August 2009 in their first home game of the 2009–10 Bundesliga season, a 3–0 win against VfL Bochum, playing the entire match. At the end of the season, he left Schalke.

On 6 September 2011, TuS Koblenz, playing in the fourth tier of German football, surprisingly announced his signing, giving him a contract until the end of the season.

== International career ==
Mineiro made his international debut on 25 April 2001 in a 1–1 draw with Peru at São Paulo's Estádio do Morumbi, in 2002 FIFA World Cup qualification. He was one of five debutants under manager Émerson Leão.

Mineiro was a late call-up for Brazil's 2006 FIFA World Cup squad. A knee injury sustained by Barcelona midfielder Edmílson in the run-up to the tournament forced him to withdraw, resulting in a call-up for Mineiro, but he did not receive any playing time in Germany.

Mineiro was selected to participate in Copa América 2007, and started every match as Brazil went on to win the tournament in Venezuela.

== Honours ==
=== Club ===
São Caetano

- Campeonato Paulista: 2004

São Paulo

- Campeonato Paulista: 2005
- Copa Libertadores: 2005
- FIFA Club World Cup: 2005
- Campeonato Brasileiro Série A: 2006

=== International ===
Brazil

- Copa América: 2007

=== Individual ===
- Campeonato Brasileiro Série A Team of the Year: 2006
- Troféu Mesa Redonda best player: 2006
