= Andrés Franzoia =

Argentine footballer

Personal information
- Full name: Andrés Franzoia
- Date of birth: 21 October 1985 (age 41)
- Place of birth: San Pedro, Argentina
- Height: 1.79 m (5 ft 10 in)
- Positions: Attacking midfielder; striker

Team information
- Current team: Defensores Unidos

Youth career
- Boca Juniors

Senior career*
Years	Team	Apps	(Gls)
2005–2008	Boca Juniors	12	(1)
2007–2008	→ Huracán (loan)	25	(9)
2008–2010	Rosario Central	37	(2)
2010	→ Huracán (loan)	16	(1)
2010–2011	Arsenal de Sarandí	24	(0)
2011–2012	Olimpo	30	(8)
2012–2013	Unión	26	(9)
2013–2015	Barcelona SC	13	(1)
2015	Argentinos Juniors	8	(2)
2016	Sarmiento	4	(0)
2018–	Defensores Unidos	?	(?)
- * Club domestic league appearances and goals as of 8 April 2018

Andrés Franzoia (born 21 October 1985 in San Pedro, Buenos Aires) is an Argentine football forward or second striker. He currently plays for Defensores Unidos.

== Career ==
Franzoia is a product of the Boca Juniors youth system, he made his professional debut on 29 May 2005 in a 0–0 draw with Estudiantes de La Plata. In his second game for the club he scored a goal in a remarkable 7–1 win over San Lorenzo.

Franzoia had a number of opportunities to play in the first team with Chino Benítez and Ricardo Lavolpe as managers, but only played one game since Miguel Ángel Russo took over.

In 2007, he joined Huracán on a year long loan. He performed well in his new club, scoring 9 goals in 25 games to help the team to finish well clear of the relegation zone following their promotion to the Argentine Primera.

In 2008, Franzoia was bought from Boca by Rosario Central. After one and a half season in Central, he returned on a six-month loan to Huracán in January 2010. After finishing the loan, he returned to a recently relegated Rosario Central and agreed the termination of his contract earlier. Subsequently, he joined Arsenal de Sarandí.

On 12 July 2013, he became the new reinforcement of Barcelona Sporting Club to face the second stage of their tournament and the Copa Sudamericana. The striker will occupy the spot left open after Ariel Nahuelpan was transferred to Club Universidad Nacional A.C., more commonly known as Pumas de la UNAM.

== Honours ==
Season	Club	Title
2005	Boca Juniors	Recopa Sudamericana
2005	Boca Juniors	Copa Sudamericana
Clausura 2006	Boca Juniors	Primera División Argentina
2006	Boca Juniors	Copa Sudamericana
2007	Boca Juniors	Copa Libertadores
