= Francisco Alex =

Brazilian footballer (born 1983)

Personal information
- Full name: Francisco Alex Souza da Silva
- Date of birth: 23 December 1983 (age 42)
- Place of birth: Vitorino Freire, Brazil
- Height: 1.78 m (5 ft 10 in)
- Position: Attacking midfielder

Team information
- Current team: São Caetano

Youth career
- 2001–2002: Rio Preto

Senior career*
Years	Team	Apps	(Gls)
2003	Rio Preto		
2004	Inter de Limeira		
2005	Flamengo-SP		
2005	Grêmio Barueri		
2006	Oswaldo Cruz		
2006	Ferroviária		
2006–2010	São Paulo	1	(1)
2008	→ Sport (loan)	7	(1)
2009–2010	→ Paulista (loan)	5	(0)
2010	→ Rio Branco-SP (loan)	5	(0)
2010	→ Mogi Mirim (loan)		
2011	Itapirense	2	(0)
2011	São Bernardo		
2012	São José-RS	16	(1)
2012	Juventude	8	(0)
2013	Botafogo-SP	2	(0)
2013	Catanduvense	13	(0)
2014	Marília	5	(0)
2014–2015	Água Santa	41	(8)
2015	Treze	7	(0)
2015	Portuguesa	6	(0)
2015	Taboão da Serra		
2015–2016	Água Santa	14	(0)
2016	Oeste	2	(0)
2016–	São Caetano	0	(0)
- * Club domestic league appearances and goals as of 16 Dec 2016

Francisco Alex Souza da Silva or simply Francisco Alex (born 23 December 1983 in Vitorino Freire, Maranhão), is a Brazilian footballer who played the 2016 season as an attacking midfielder for Oeste. He just signed in for São Caetano for the 2017 A2 Campeonato Paulista.

== Honours ==
Rio Preto

- Campeonato Paulista Série A2: 2004

São Paulo

- Série A: 2007
