= Alex Dias =

Brazilian footballer (born 1972)

Personal information
- Full name: Alex Dias de Almeida
- Date of birth: May 26, 1972 (age 54)
- Place of birth: Rio Brilhante, Brazil
- Height: 1.75 m (5 ft 9 in)
- Position: Striker

Youth career
- 1990–1992: Remo

Senior career*
Years	Team	Apps	(Gls)
1993–1994	Remo	21	(1)
1995	Boavista	16	(1)
1996–1998	Goiás	73	(18)
1999–2001	Saint-Étienne	54	(28)
2001–2002	Paris Saint-Germain	17	(3)
2002–2003	Saint-Étienne	29	(6)
2003–2004	Cruzeiro	8	(0)
2004	Goiás	41	(22)
2005–2006	Vasco da Gama	58	(31)
2006	São Paulo	24	(19)
2007	Fluminense	42	(13)
2008	Goiás	10	(1)
2008	Brasiliense	100	(10)
2009	CRAC	17	(6)
2009	Mixto	4	(1)
2009	Vila Nova	15	(2)
2010	Pelotas	10	(0)
2010	América	1 4	(1)
2012	Aparecidense	54	(12)
2015	Fernandópolis	63	(13)
- * Club domestic league appearances and goals

Alex Dias de Almeida (born May 26, 1972) is a Brazilian former professional footballer who played as a striker.

== Honours ==
- Winner of Pará State championship in 1993 and 1994 with Clube do Remo
- Winner of Goiás State championship in 1997, 1998 and 1999 with Goiás Esporte Clube
- Winner of Brazilian championship in 2003 with Cruzeiro Esporte Clube
- Winner of Brazilian championship in 2006 with São Paulo Futebol Clube
- Winner of Valdir Pereira Trophy (Taça Valdir Pereira) in 2007 with Fluminense for scoring the first goal in the Estádio Olímpico João Havelange
- Winner of Brazilian's cup with Fluminense in 2007
