= Carlinhos (footballer, born January 1986) =

Brazilian footballer

Personal information
- Full name: Carlos Henrique de Oliveira
- Date of birth: January 18, 1986 (age 40)
- Place of birth: Matão, São Paulo, Brazil
- Height: 1.78 m (5 ft 10 in)
- Position: Central defender

Youth career
- 2003–2005: São Paulo

Senior career*
Years	Team	Apps	(Gls)
2006	São Paulo	2	(0)
2007	América-SP (Loan)		
2008	São Paulo		
- * Club domestic league appearances and goals

Carlos Henrique de Oliveira or simply Carlinhos (born January 18, 1986) is a central-defender player from Brazil.

Made his professional debut on August 6, 2006 against Botafogo in a 1-1 draw, after a swift rise through the Under-20 team. He was loaned to América-SP for the 2007 season.

== Honours ==
- Brazilian League: 2006

== Contract ==
16 August 2006 to 16 August 2008
