= Lenílson Batista =

Brazilian footballer

Lenílson
Personal information
- Full name: Lenílson Batista de Jesús
- Date of birth: May 1, 1981 (age 45)
- Place of birth: Salvador, Brazil
- Height: 1.84 m (6 ft 1/2 in)
- Positions: Left midfielder; attacking midfielder

Team information
- Current team: Botafogo-PB

Youth career
- 1999–2000: Galícia
- 2001–2002: Atlético Mineiro

Senior career*
Years	Team	Apps	(Gls)
2003	Atlético Mineiro	2	(0)
2004	Marília		
2005	XV Piracicaba		
2005	Ituiutaba		
2006	Noroeste		
2006–2007	São Paulo	30	(8)
2007–2009	Jaguares	29	(5)
2008	→ Atlético Mineiro (loan)	8	(1)
2009	→ Paraná (loan)		
2010	Vitória		
2010–2011	Duque de Caxias	13	(1)
2012	Linense		
2012	Guaratinguetá	30	(3)
2013	Linense		
2013–	Botafogo-PB		
- * Club domestic league appearances and goals as of August 24, 2008

Lenilson Batista de Jesús (born May 1, 1981 in Salvador), also known as Lenilson Batista de Souza, Lenilson Batista, or simply Lenílson, is a Brazilian left midfielder.
