= 2005 FIFA Club World Championship =

2005 FIFA Club World Championship Toyota Cup
FIFA Club World Championship Toyota Cup Japan 2005 FIFAクラブワールドチャンピオンシップトヨタカップジャパン2005
- FIFA CWCTC 2005 official logo

Tournament details
- Host country: Japan
- Dates: 11–18 December
- Teams: 6 (from 6 confederations)
- Venues: 3 (in 3 host cities)

Final positions
- Champions: (Brazil) São Paulo (1st title)
- Runners-up: (England) Liverpool
- Third place: (Costa Rica) Saprissa
- Fourth place: (Saudi Arabia) Al-Ittihad

Tournament statistics
- Matches played: 7
- Goals scored: 19 (2.71 per match)
- Attendance: 261,456 (37,351 per match)
- Top scorer(s): Amoroso (São Paulo); Mohammed Noor (Al-Ittihad); Peter Crouch (Liverpool); Álvaro Saborío (Saprissa); 2 goals each
- Best player: Rogério Ceni (São Paulo)
- Fair play award: (England) Liverpool

The 2005 FIFA Club World Championship (officially known as the FIFA Club World Championship Toyota Cup Japan 2005 for sponsorship reasons) was the second FIFA Club World Championship, a football competition organised by FIFA for the champion clubs of the six continental confederations. It was the first to be held after by the merger between the Intercontinental Cup and the FIFA Club World Championship (which had been played in a first edition in 2000).

The tournament was held in Japan from 11 to 18 December 2005 and won by Brazilian club São Paulo, who defeated English side Liverpool 1–0 in the final.

This would be the only edition of the tournament until the 2022 edition where the CONCACAF representative didn't come from Mexico.

== Background ==
The 2005 tournament was created as a merger between the Intercontinental Cup and the earlier FIFA Club World Championships. The previous of these had been running as an annual tournament between the champions of Europe and South America since 1960; the latter had undergone just one tournament, the 2000 FIFA Club World Championship. The 2001 tournament had been cancelled when FIFA's marketing partner ISL went bankrupt. To celebrate the marriage between the two competitions, a new trophy was introduced by FIFA.

As a result of this merger, the tournament was conceived as being smaller than the original Club World Championship, which had lasted two weeks, yet building on the one game format of the Intercontinental Cup. Six clubs were invited to take part in the tournament, one representing each regional football confederation. The competition's name, which was the simple union between the name of the two previous merging competitions, was evidently too long, and was going to be reduced the following year, becoming the FIFA Club World Cup.

== Format ==
The competition was a knockout tournament so each team played two or three matches. The champions of the four "weaker" confederations played in the quarter-finals; the losers played in a fifth place play-off. The winners were then joined by the European and South American champions in the semi-finals; the losers played in a third place play-off.

The matches were held in Tokyo's National (Olympic) Stadium, Toyota Stadium in Toyota, Aichi, near Nagoya and the International Stadium in Yokohama, where the final was played. For marketing purposes it was known as the FIFA Club World Championship Toyota Cup.

== Qualified teams ==
It was all six clubs' first appearance in the FIFA Club World Championship.

Location of teams of the 2005 FIFA Club World Championship

Team	Confederation	Qualification	Participation
Entering in the semi-finals
(England) Liverpool	UEFA	2004–05 UEFA Champions League winners	Debut
(Brazil) São Paulo	CONMEBOL	2005 Copa Libertadores winners	Debut
Entering in the quarter-finals
(Egypt) Al Ahly	CAF	2005 CAF Champions League winners	Debut
(Saudi Arabia) Al-Ittihad	AFC	2005 AFC Champions League winners	Debut
(Costa Rica) Saprissa	CONCACAF	2005 CONCACAF Champions' Cup winners	Debut
(Australia) Sydney FC	OFC	2005 Oceania Club Championship winners	Debut

== Venues ==
Tokyo, Yokohama and Toyota were the three cities to serve as venues for the 2005 FIFA Club World Cup.

Yokohama	Tokyo	Toyota
International Stadium Yokohama	National Stadium	Toyota Stadium
35°30′36.16″N 139°36′22.49″E	35°40′41.00″N 139°42′53.00″E	35°05′04.02″N 137°10′14.02″E
Capacity: 72,327	Capacity: 57,363	Capacity: 45,000
2005 FIFA Club World Championship (Japan)

== Match officials ==
Confederation	Referee	Assistant referees
AFC	(Japan) Toru Kamikawa	(Japan) Yoshikazu Hiroshima (South Korea) Kim Dae-Young
CAF	(Morocco) Mohamed Guezzaz	(Cameroon) Jean Marie Endeng Zogo
CONCACAF	(Mexico) Benito Archundia	(Mexico) Arturo Velázquez (Canada) Héctor Vergara
CONMEBOL	(Brazil) Carlos Eugênio Simon (Chile) Carlos Chandia	(Chile) Cristian Julio (Chile) Mario Vargas
UEFA	(England) Graham Poll	(England) Glenn Turner (England) Philip Sharp
UEFA	(France) Alain Sars	(France) Frédéric Arnault (France) Vincent Texier

== Matches ==
Quarter-finals
11 December – Tokyo
(Saudi Arabia) Al-Ittihad	1
(Egypt) Al Ahly	0
12 December – Toyota
(Australia) Sydney FC	0
(Costa Rica) Saprissa	1

Semi-finals
14 December – Tokyo
(Saudi Arabia) Al-Ittihad	2
(Brazil) São Paulo	3
15 December – Yokohama
(Costa Rica) Saprissa	0
(England) Liverpool	3
Match for fifth place
16 December – Tokyo
(Egypt) Al Ahly	1
(Australia) Sydney FC	2

Final
18 December – Yokohama
(Brazil) São Paulo	1
(England) Liverpool	0
Match for third place
18 December – Yokohama
(Saudi Arabia) Al-Ittihad	2
(Costa Rica) Saprissa	3

=== Quarter-finals ===
11 December 2005
19:20

Al-Ittihad (Saudi Arabia)	1–0	(Egypt) Al Ahly
Noor 78'	Report

Olympic Stadium, Tokyo
Attendance: 28,281
Referee: Graham Poll (England)

12 December 2005
19:20

Sydney FC (Australia)	0–1	(Costa Rica) Saprissa
	Report	Bolaños 47'

Toyota Stadium, Toyota
Attendance: 28,538
Referee: Toru Kamikawa (Japan)

=== Semi-finals ===
14 December 2005
19:20

Al-Ittihad (Saudi Arabia)	2–3	(Brazil) São Paulo
Noor 33'; Al-Montashari 68'	Report	Amoroso 16', 47'; Ceni 57' (pen.)

Olympic Stadium, Tokyo
Attendance: 31,510
Referee: Alain Sars (France)

15 December 2005
19:20

Saprissa (Costa Rica)	0–3	(England) Liverpool
	Report	Crouch 3', 58'; Gerrard 32'

International Stadium Yokohama, Yokohama
Attendance: 43,902
Referee: Carlos Chandia (Chile)

=== Match for fifth place ===
16 December 2005
19:20

Al Ahly (Egypt)	1–2	(Australia) Sydney FC
Moteab 45'	Report	Yorke 35'; Carney 66'

Olympic Stadium, Tokyo
Attendance: 15,951
Referee: Toru Kamikawa (Japan)

=== Match for third place ===
18 December 2005
16:20

Al-Ittihad (Saudi Arabia)	2–3	(Costa Rica) Saprissa
Kallon 28'; Job 53' (pen.)	Report	Saborío 13', 85' (pen.); Gómez 89'

International Stadium Yokohama, Yokohama
Attendance: 46,453
Referee: Mohamed Guezzaz (Morocco)

=== Final ===
18 December 2005
19:20

São Paulo (Brazil)	1–0	(England) Liverpool
Mineiro 27'	Report

International Stadium Yokohama, Yokohama
Attendance: 66,821
Referee: Benito Archundia (Mexico)

== Goalscorers ==
Rank	Player	Team	Goals
1	(Brazil) Amoroso	(Brazil) São Paulo	2
1	(England) Peter Crouch	(England) Liverpool	2
1	(Saudi Arabia) Mohammed Noor	(Saudi Arabia) Al-Ittihad	2
1	(Costa Rica) Álvaro Saborío	(Costa Rica) Saprissa	2
5	(Saudi Arabia) Hamad Al-Montashari	(Saudi Arabia) Al-Ittihad	1
5	(Costa Rica) Christian Bolaños	(Costa Rica) Saprissa	1
5	(Australia) David Carney	(Australia) Sydney FC	1
5	(England) Steven Gerrard	(England) Liverpool	1
5	(Costa Rica) Rónald Gómez	(Costa Rica) Saprissa	1
5	(Cameroon) Joseph-Désiré Job	(Saudi Arabia) Al-Ittihad	1
5	(Sierra Leone) Mohammed Kallon	(Saudi Arabia) Al-Ittihad	1
5	(Brazil) Mineiro	(Brazil) São Paulo	1
5	(Egypt) Emad Moteab	(Egypt) Al Ahly	1
5	(Brazil) Rogério Ceni	(Brazil) São Paulo	1
5	(Trinidad and Tobago) Dwight Yorke	(Australia) Sydney FC	1

== Reaction ==
The tournament was quite well received, although some commentators have stated that, excluding São Paulo and Liverpool, the quality of football was quite poor leading to a view that it might have been better retaining the two continent format of the European/South American Cup.

== Awards ==
Adidas Golden Ball Toyota Award	Adidas Silver Ball	Adidas Bronze Ball
(Brazil) Rogério Ceni (São Paulo)	(England) Steven Gerrard (Liverpool)	(Costa Rica) Christian Bolaños (Saprissa)
FIFA Fair Play Award
(England) Liverpool
