= 2006 Campeonato Brasileiro Série A =

50th edition of the official championship of brazilian soccer

Campeonato Brasileiro Série A
- Season: 2006
- Champions: São Paulo; 4th Campeonato Brasileiro title 4th Brazilian title
- Relegated: Ponte Preta; Fortaleza; São Caetano; Santa Cruz
- Copa Libertadores: São Paulo; Internacional; Grêmio; Santos; Paraná; Flamengo (2006 Copa do Brasil winners)
- Copa Sudamericana: São Paulo; Vasco da Gama; Figueirense; Goiás; Corinthians; Cruzeiro; Botafogo; Atlético Paranaense
- Matches: 380
- Goals: 1,030 (2.71 per match)
- Top goalscorer: Souza (17 goals)
- Biggest home win: Figueirense 6 – 1 Palmeiras
- Biggest away win: Atlético-PR 0 - 5 Botafogo
- Highest scoring: Atlético-PR 6 - 4 Vasco da Gama
- Average attendance: 16,151

The 2006 Campeonato Brasileiro Série A was the 50th edition of the Campeonato Brasileiro Série A, a Brazilian professional league for men's football clubs. It began on April 15, 2006, and reached its end on December 3, 2006.

== Format ==
The format was similar to the 2005 edition, though fielding two fewer teams. 20 teams competed, each team playing the other in a home-and-away format. At the season finale, the team with the most accumulated points (3 for each win, 1 for a draw, none for a loss) was declared champion.

== Calendar ==
From April 15 through June 4, 10 rounds were played. From June 9 until July 9, the tournament was suspended for the FIFA World Cup 2006. Play resumed on July 12 and continued until December 3.

Several teams had their attentions divided between other tournaments over the same duration:

- Copa do Brasil - Flamengo defeated Vasco da Gama
- Copa Libertadores - Internacional defeated São Paulo
- Copa Sudamericana - Atlético-PR was the best Brazilian team, losing in the semifinals.

== Final standings ==
Pos	Team	Pld	W	D	L	GF	GA	GD	Pts	Qualification or relegation
1	São Paulo	38	22	12	4	66	32	+34	78	Qualified for the 2007 Copa Libertadores and 2007 Copa Sudamericana
2	Internacional	38	20	9	9	52	36	+16	69	Qualified for the 2007 Copa Libertadores
3	Grêmio	38	20	7	11	64	45	+19	67	Qualified for the 2007 Copa Libertadores
4	Santos	38	18	10	10	57	36	+21	64	Qualified for the 2007 Copa Libertadores
5	Paraná	38	18	6	14	56	49	+7	60	Qualified for the 2007 Copa Libertadores
6	Vasco	38	15	14	9	57	50	+7	59	Qualified for the 2007 Copa Sudamericana
7	Figueirense	38	15	12	11	57	44	+13	57	Qualified for the 2007 Copa Sudamericana
8	Goiás	38	15	10	13	63	49	+14	55	Qualified for the 2007 Copa Sudamericana
9	Corinthians	38	15	8	15	41	46	−5	53	Qualified for the 2007 Copa Sudamericana
10	Cruzeiro	38	14	11	13	52	45	+7	53	Qualified for the 2007 Copa Sudamericana
11	Flamengo	38	15	7	16	44	48	−4	52	Qualified for the 2007 Copa Libertadores by winning the 2006 Copa do Brasil
12	Botafogo	38	13	12	13	52	50	+2	51	Qualified for the 2007 Copa Sudamericana
13	Atlético-PR	38	13	9	16	61	62	−1	48	Qualified for the 2007 Copa Sudamericana
14	Juventude	38	13	8	17	44	54	−10	47	
15	Fluminense	38	11	12	15	48	58	−10	45	
16	Palmeiras	38	12	8	18	58	70	−12	44	
17	Ponte Preta	38	10	9	19	45	65	−20	39	Relegated to Série B 2007
18	Fortaleza	38	8	14	16	39	62	−23	38	Relegated to Série B 2007
19	São Caetano	38	9	9	20	37	53	−16	36	Relegated to Série B 2007
20	Santa Cruz	38	7	7	24	41	75	−34	28	Relegated to Série B 2007

== Top goal scorers ==
Scorer	Goals	Team
Souza	17	Goiás
Schwenck	14	Figueirense
Soares	13	Figueirense
Cícero	13	Figueirense
Tuta	13	Fluminense

== Fixtures and results ==
Home \ Away	CAP	BOT	COR	CRU	FIG	FLA	FLU	FOR	GOI	GRE	INT	JUV	PAL	PAR	PON	STA	SAN	SCA	SPO	VAS
Atlético-PR		0–5	1–2	1–1	1–4	1–0	1–2	0–0	2–3	2–3	1–2	1–0	2–0	4–0	3–0	2–1	2–1	3–1	0–0	6–4
Botafogo	0–4		0–0	1–0	2–3	0–2	2–1	1–0	2–2	2–2	0–1	2–1	1–3	4–0	4–1	1–0	4–3	2–1	1–1	4–1
Corinthians	2–1	1–0		1–0	1–3	0–2	1–1	2–2	0–1	0–2	0–1	5–3	1–0	1–0	1–0	1–0	0–3	3–0	1–3	1–1
Cruzeiro	1–1	3–1	2–0		2–2	2–1	2–3	0–0	0–0	3–1	2–1	2–0	1–0	2–2	5–1	3–3	1–1	3–0	2–2	2–1
Figueirense	3–3	1–0	0–0	0–2		1–1	1–0	0–0	2–2	2–0	1–0	1–0	6–1	0–1	2–1	2–0	2–1	1–1	0–2	0–0
Flamengo	1–0	1–0	3–0	1–0	0–2		4–1	0–0	1–0	1–0	1–2	3–1	2–1	1–4	0–0	1–1	2–2	4–1	1–1	0–1
Fluminense	1–2	1–1	1–2	1–0	2–0	1–0		1–3	1–0	1–2	2–3	3–2	1–1	2–1	0–0	1–1	1–0	2–2	1–2	1–1
Fortaleza	3–4	2–3	0–4	0–2	1–1	3–4	2–5		0–3	1–0	1–2	4–1	0–0	1–1	1–0	1–4	1–1	2–1	1–0	1–1
Goiás	2–2	2–2	3–1	2–3	2–1	0–1	3–1	1–1		4–0	2–2	2–0	1–3	1–2	3–0	5–3	0–0	2–1	0–2	2–0
Grêmio	2–0	4–0	2–0	2–1	1–2	3–0	4–4	4–1	2–0		0–1	1–0	2–1	2–1	4–0	3–1	1–0	1–1	1–1	1–2
Internacional	2–0	0–0	1–1	1–1	2–4	1–0	2–0	3–0	1–4	0–0		1–0	1–1	3–2	2–0	1–0	0–0	1–0	3–1	1–2
Juventude	3–2	1–0	0–0	2–0	1–0	1–0	1–1	2–2	1–1	1–2	2–0		3–2	1–0	0–1	4–1	3–2	1–0	1–1	0–0
Palmeiras	2–2	2–1	1–0	1–1	1–1	3–1	3–0	3–0	1–3	0–1	1–4	1–1		4–2	2–3	2–1	1–2	3–1	3–1	4–2
Paraná	2–1	0–0	1–2	1–0	0–0	0–2	1–0	2–0	1–0	5–2	1–0	0–1	4–2		2–1	3–0	1–1	1–0	0–0	2–1
Ponte Preta	1–1	1–2	3–2	0–1	3–0	3–0	3–0	1–3	3–2	1–1	0–2	3–1	1–1	2–5		2–0	1–0	1–2	1–3	1–2
Santa Cruz	1–2	1–1	1–0	4–1	0–0	3–0	1–2	0–1	2–1	2–4	0–2	1–0	3–2	1–3	1–1		1–1	0–3	1–3	0–4
Santos	2–0	0–0	2–0	2–0	2–1	3–0	1–1	2–0	2–1	1–0	2–1	3–2	5–1	1–0	3–1	2–1		1–0	0–1	0–2
São Caetano	2–1	1–1	0–1	2–1	3–1	2–2	1–1	0–0	1–2	0–2	1–1	0–2	2–0	0–2	1–1	2–0	2–0		0–1	0–1
São Paulo	1–1	3–0	0–0	2–0	2–1	1–0	1–0	1–1	2–1	2–1	2–0	5–0	4–1	3–2	1–1	4–0	0–4	1–0		5–1
Vasco	2–1	0–0	2–4	1–0	3–1	3–1	1–1	2–0	0–0	1–1	1–1	1–1	3–0	3–1	2–2	2–1	1–1	1–2	1–1	

Legend: Blue = home team win; Yellow = draw; Red = away team win.
