= 2019 UEFA Super Cup =

44th edition of the annual football match organised by UEFA

- Match programme cover
Liverpool	Chelsea
(England)	(England)
2	2
- After extra time Liverpool won 5–4 on penalties
- Date: 14 August 2019
- Venue: Vodafone Park, Istanbul
- Man of the Match: Sadio Mané (Liverpool)
- Referee: Stéphanie Frappart (France)
- Attendance: 38,434
- Weather: Cloudy night 26 °C (79 °F); 73% humidity

The 2019 UEFA Super Cup was the 44th edition of the UEFA Super Cup, an annual football match organised by UEFA and contested by the reigning champions of the two main European club competitions, the UEFA Champions League and the UEFA Europa League. The match featured two English sides, Liverpool, the winners of the 2018–19 UEFA Champions League, and Chelsea, the winners of the 2018–19 UEFA Europa League. The match was played at Vodafone Park in Istanbul, Turkey on 14 August 2019. The match was the first all-English UEFA Super Cup, and the eighth overall Super Cup to feature two teams from the same country. For the first time, the video assistant referee (VAR) system was used in the competition.

Liverpool won the match 5–4 on penalties following a 2–2 draw after extra time for their fourth UEFA Super Cup title. As winners, Liverpool were rewarded £4 million in prize money.

== Teams ==
Team	Qualification	Previous participations (bold indicates winners)
(England) Liverpool	Winners of the 2018–19 UEFA Champions League	5 (**1977**, 1978, 1984, **2001**, **2005**)
(England) Chelsea	Winners of the 2018–19 UEFA Europa League	3 (**1998**, 2012, 2013)

== Venue ==
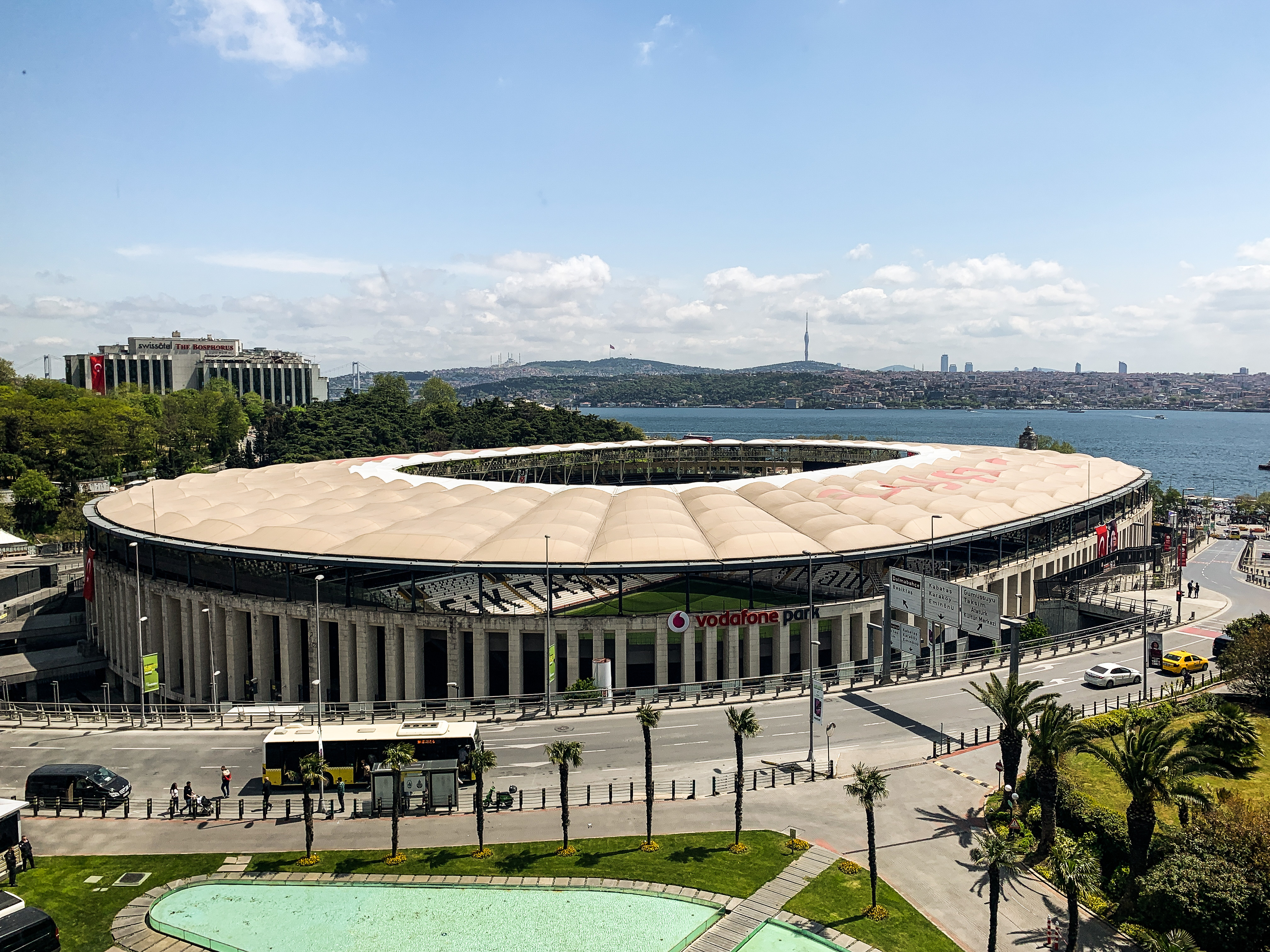
The Vodafone Park in Istanbul hosted the match.

This was the first UEFA Super Cup held in Turkey, and the third time a UEFA club competition final was held in the country, after the 2005 UEFA Champions League Final at the Atatürk Olympic Stadium and the 2009 UEFA Cup Final at the Şükrü Saracoğlu Stadium, both also in Istanbul.

The stadium is the home ground of Turkish club Beşiktaş. UEFA regulations regarding naming rights of non-tournament sponsors required that the stadium be referred to as Beşiktaş Park in all UEFA materials.

=== Host selection ===
For the first time ever, an open bidding process was launched on 9 December 2016 by UEFA to select the venues of the club competition finals (UEFA Champions League, UEFA Europa League, UEFA Women's Champions League, and UEFA Super Cup). Associations had until 27 January 2017 to express interest, and bid dossiers had to be submitted by 6 June 2017.

UEFA announced on 3 February 2017 that nine associations expressed interest in hosting, and confirmed on 7 June 2017 that seven associations submitted bids for the 2019 UEFA Super Cup:

Bidding associations for 2019 UEFA Super Cup
Country	Stadium	City	Capacity	Notes
Albania	Arena Kombëtare	Tirana	22,500	
France	Stadium Municipal	Toulouse	33,150	
Israel	Sammy Ofer Stadium	Haifa	30,870	
Kazakhstan	Astana Arena	Astana	30,244	Also bid for 2019 UEFA Women's Champions League Final
Northern Ireland	Windsor Park	Belfast	18,434	
Poland	Stadion Energa Gdańsk	Gdańsk	41,160	Preferred over National Stadium, Warsaw
Turkey	Vodafone Park	Istanbul	41,188	Also bid for 2019 UEFA Europa League Final

The following associations expressed interest in hosting but eventually did not submit bids:

- Hungary: Groupama Arena, Budapest
- Scotland: Hampden Park, Glasgow

The bid evaluation report was published by UEFA on 14 September 2017. Vodafone Park was selected as the venue by the UEFA Executive Committee on 20 September 2017.

== Background ==
The match was the first UEFA Super Cup to feature two English teams, after all-English finals in both of UEFA's seasonal tournaments; Liverpool beat Tottenham Hotspur in the Champions League and Chelsea beat Arsenal in the Europa League. The match was the eighth overall Super Cup to feature two teams from the same country, previously achieved five times by Spanish teams (2006, 2014, 2015, 2016 and 2018) and twice by Italian teams (1990 and 1993). This also ensured that it would be the first Super Cup to be won by an English team since Liverpool in 2005.

This was the eleventh meeting between both clubs in UEFA competition. Liverpool and Chelsea were drawn against each other in five successive Champions League seasons between 2004–05 and 2008–09. Chelsea had won three of these meetings (including one after extra time) to Liverpool's two, with the other five ending in draws (including one decided on penalties in Liverpool's favour). Each side had advanced against the other two times apiece, with the other tie coming in the 2005–06 UEFA Champions League group stage as Liverpool's unique qualifying situation that season did not grant them association protection.

The teams have met twice previously in domestic cup finals, which Chelsea have triumphed on both occasions. First was in the 2005 Football League Cup Final, played outside England at the Millennium Stadium in Wales while Wembley Stadium was being rebuilt, where they won 3–2 after extra time, and more recently in the 2012 FA Cup Final at Wembley, winning 2–1. They both also contested the English super cup, the FA Community Shield, in 2006 and Liverpool won 2–1 on that occasion at Cardiff's Millennium Stadium.

=== Officials ===
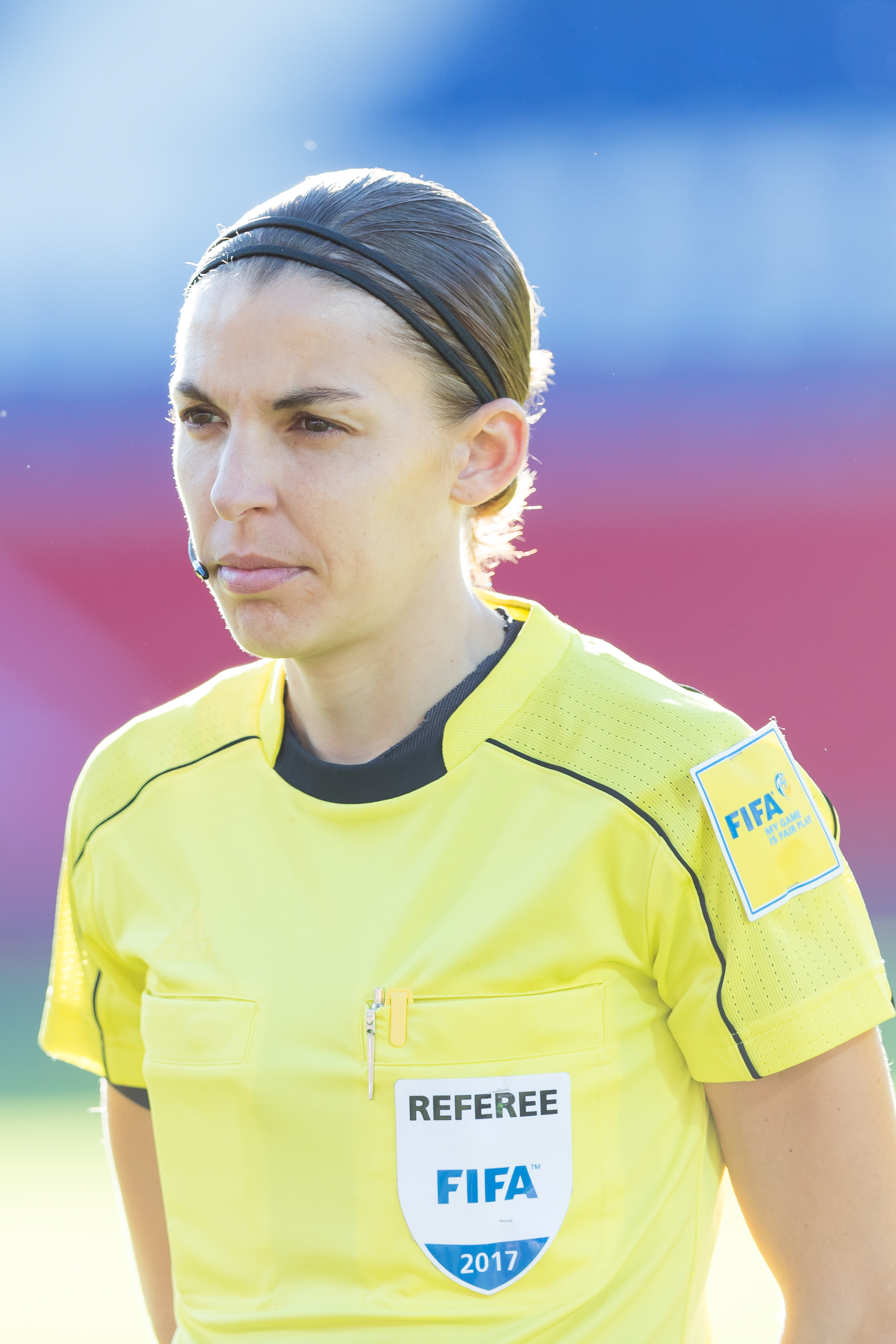
Stéphanie Frappart, the referee for the match.

On 2 August 2019, UEFA named French official Stéphanie Frappart as the referee for the match, marking the first time in history a woman would referee the final of a UEFA men's competition. Frappart has been a FIFA referee since 2009, and had officiated at the 2019 FIFA Women's World Cup in the month prior, where she was appointed as the referee for the final. She also previously officiated at the 2015 FIFA Women's World Cup, 2016 Summer Olympics and UEFA Women's Euro 2017, and became the first woman to referee in Ligue 1 in April 2019. Her compatriot Manuela Nicolosi was chosen as one of the assistant referees, along with Irish official Michelle O'Neill, while Cüneyt Çakır of Turkey was chosen as the fourth official. French referee Clément Turpin was named the video assistant referee, presiding over the first use of the technology in the UEFA Super Cup. His fellow countryman François Letexier was named as one of the assistant video assistant referees for the match, along with Massimiliano Irrati of Italy, while Mark Borsch of Germany offside VAR.

== Match ==
=== Summary ===
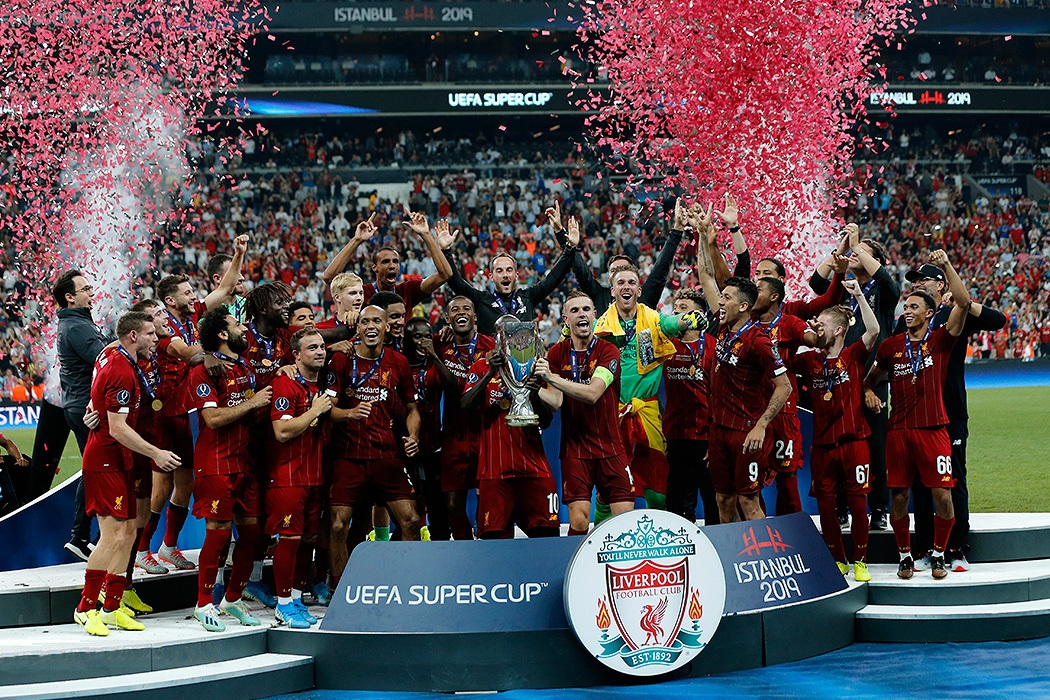
Liverpool winger Sadio Mané lifting the UEFA Super Cup after scoring twice against Chelsea in the final.

Chelsea took the lead after 36 minutes when a pass from Christian Pulisic played in Olivier Giroud on the left and his first-time left-foot shot found the right corner of the net. Pulisic had a second goal ruled out shortly after for offside after confirmation from VAR. Sadio Mané made it 1–1 after 48 minutes when he scored from close range at the second attempt after a flick past the goalkeeper from substitute Roberto Firmino. The match went to extra time and Sadio Mané got his second goal of the match in the 95th minute with a side-foot into the top right-hand corner of the net after Roberto Firmino found him with a cut-back from the left.

Chelsea were awarded a penalty six minutes later when Adrián was adjudged to have brought down Tammy Abraham when he ran onto a pass in the penalty area. Jorginho scored to make it 2–2 with a low shot to the right corner. The match went to a penalty shoot-out and with the score at 5–4 Tammy Abraham saw his low shot saved by Adrián with his right leg to win the game for Liverpool.

=== Details ===
The Champions League winners were designated as the "home" team for administrative purposes.

14 August 2019
22:00 UTC+3

Liverpool (England)	2–2 (a.e.t.)	(England) Chelsea
Mané 48', 95'	Report	Giroud 36'; Jorginho 101' (pen.)
Penalties
Firmino (penalty scored); Fabinho (penalty scored); Origi (penalty scored); Alexander-Arnold (penalty scored); Salah (penalty scored)	5–4	(penalty scored) Jorginho; (penalty scored) Barkley; (penalty scored) Mount; (penalty scored) Emerson; (penalty missed) Abraham

Vodafone Park, Istanbul
Attendance: 38,434
Referee: Stéphanie Frappart (France)

**Liverpool**	**Chelsea**

GK	13	(Spain) Adrián
RB	12	(England) Joe Gomez
CB	32	(Cameroon) Joël Matip
CB	4	(Netherlands) Virgil van Dijk
LB	26	(Scotland) Andy Robertson		(substituted off) 91'
CM	7	(England) James Milner		(substituted off) 64'
CM	3	(Brazil) Fabinho
CM	14	(England) Jordan Henderson (c)	(yellow card) 85'
RF	15	(England) Alex Oxlade-Chamberlain		(substituted off) 46'
CF	11	(Egypt) Mohamed Salah
LF	10	(Senegal) Sadio Mané		(substituted off) 103'
Substitutes:
GK	22	(England) Andy Lonergan
GK	62	(Republic of Ireland) Caoimhín Kelleher
DF	51	(Netherlands) Ki-Jana Hoever
DF	66	(England) Trent Alexander-Arnold	(yellow card) 107'	(substituted on) 91'
MF	5	(Netherlands) Georginio Wijnaldum		(substituted on) 64'
MF	20	(England) Adam Lallana
MF	23	(Switzerland) Xherdan Shaqiri
MF	67	(England) Harvey Elliott
FW	9	(Brazil) Roberto Firmino		(substituted on) 46'
FW	24	(England) Rhian Brewster
FW	27	(Belgium) Divock Origi		(substituted on) 103'
Manager:
(Germany) Jürgen Klopp

GK	1	(Spain) Kepa Arrizabalaga
RB	28	(Spain) César Azpilicueta (c)	(yellow card) 79'
CB	15	(France) Kurt Zouma
CB	4	(Denmark) Andreas Christensen		(substituted off) 85'
LB	33	(Italy) Emerson Palmieri
DM	5	(Italy) Jorginho
CM	7	(France) N'Golo Kanté
CM	17	(Croatia) Mateo Kovačić		(substituted off) 101'
RF	22	(United States) Christian Pulisic		(substituted off) 74'
CF	18	(France) Olivier Giroud		(substituted off) 74'
LF	11	(Spain) Pedro
Substitutes:
GK	13	(Argentina) Willy Caballero
DF	2	(Germany) Antonio Rüdiger
DF	3	(Spain) Marcos Alonso
DF	21	(Italy) Davide Zappacosta
DF	29	(England) Fikayo Tomori		(substituted on) 85'
MF	8	(England) Ross Barkley		(substituted on) 101'
MF	19	(England) Mason Mount		(substituted on) 74'
MF	47	(Scotland) Billy Gilmour
FW	9	(England) Tammy Abraham		(substituted on) 74'
FW	10	(Brazil) Willian
FW	16	(Brazil) Kenedy
FW	23	(Belgium) Michy Batshuayi
Manager:
(England) Frank Lampard

Man of the Match:
Sadio Mané (Liverpool)

Assistant referees:
Manuela Nicolosi (France)
Michelle O'Neill (Republic of Ireland)
Fourth official:
Cüneyt Çakır (Turkey)
Video assistant referee:
Clément Turpin (France)
Assistant video assistant referees:
François Letexier (France)
Massimiliano Irrati (Italy)
Offside video assistant referee:
Mark Borsch (Germany)

**Match rules**

- 90 minutes
- 30 minutes of extra time if necessary
- Penalty shoot-out if scores still level
- Twelve named substitutes
- Maximum of three substitutions, with a fourth allowed in extra time

=== Statistics ===
First half
Statistic	Liverpool	Chelsea
Goals scored	0	1
Total shots	9	7
Shots on target	4	2
Saves	1	4
Ball possession	51%	49%
Corner kicks	4	2
Fouls committed	1	4
Offsides	1	3
Yellow cards	0	0
Red cards	0	0

Second half
Statistic	Liverpool	Chelsea
Goals scored	1	0
Total shots	9	6
Shots on target	5	0
Saves	0	4
Ball possession	53%	47%
Corner kicks	3	4
Fouls committed	4	5
Offsides	1	6
Yellow cards	1	1
Red cards	0	0

Extra time
Statistic	Liverpool	Chelsea
Goals scored	1	1
Total shots	2	7
Shots on target	2	4
Saves	3	1
Ball possession	51%	49%
Corner kicks	1	1
Fouls committed	5	3
Offsides	0	2
Yellow cards	1	0
Red cards	0	0

Overall
Statistic	Liverpool	Chelsea
Goals scored	2	2
Total shots	20	20
Shots on target	11	6
Saves	4	9
Ball possession	52%	48%
Corner kicks	8	7
Fouls committed	10	12
Offsides	2	11
Yellow cards	2	1
Red cards	0	0

== See also ==
- 2019 UEFA Champions League final
- 2019 UEFA Europa League final
- 2019–20 UEFA Champions League
- 2019–20 UEFA Europa League
- 2019–20 Chelsea F.C. season
- 2019–20 Liverpool F.C. season
- Chelsea F.C. in international football
- English football clubs in international competitions
- List of football matches between British clubs in UEFA competitions
- Liverpool F.C. in international football
