= 2019 FIFA Club World Cup final =

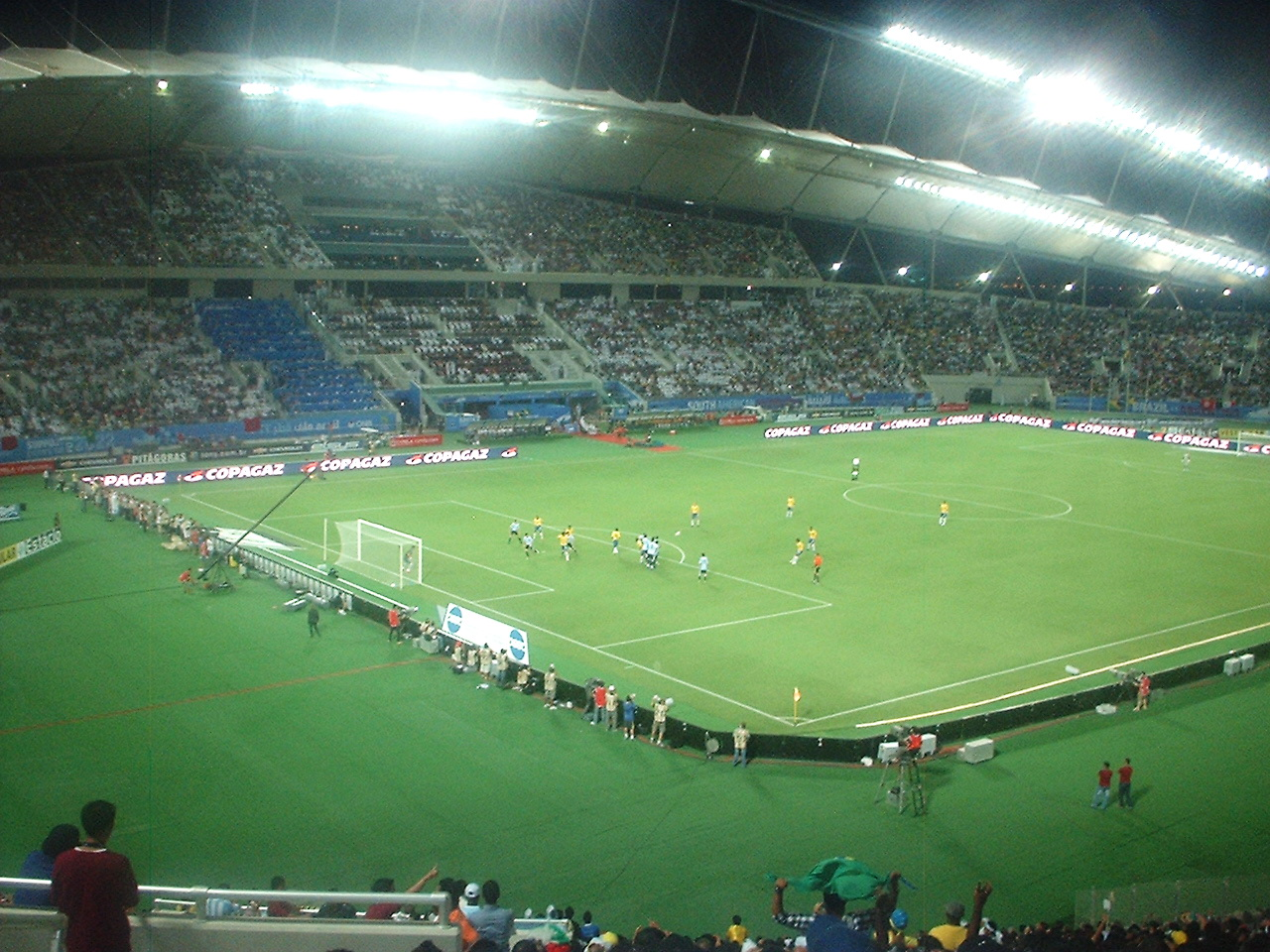
- The Khalifa International Stadium in Al Rayyan hosted the final.
- Event: 2019 FIFA Club World Cup
Liverpool	Flamengo
(England)	(Brazil)
1	0
- After extra time
- Date: 21 December 2019
- Venue: Khalifa International Stadium, Al Rayyan
- Man of the Match: Roberto Firmino (Liverpool)
- Referee: Abdulrahman Al-Jassim (Qatar)
- Attendance: 45,416
- Weather: Clear night 20 °C (68 °F); 66% humidity

The 2019 FIFA Club World Cup final was the final match of the 2019 FIFA Club World Cup, an international club association football tournament hosted by Qatar. It was the 16th final of the FIFA Club World Cup, a FIFA-organised tournament between the club champions from each of the six continental confederations, as well as the host nation's league champions.

The final was contested between English club Liverpool, representing UEFA as the reigning champions of the UEFA Champions League, and Brazilian club Flamengo, representing CONMEBOL as the reigning champions of the Copa Libertadores. The match was played at the Khalifa International Stadium in Al Rayyan on 21 December 2019.

Liverpool won the match 1–0 after extra time for their first FIFA Club World Cup title, having finished as runners-up on in 2005. As winners, Liverpool were rewarded with £4 million in prize money.

== Teams ==
In the following table, finals until 2005 were in the FIFA Club World Championship era, since 2006 were in the FIFA Club World Cup era.

Team	Confederation	Qualification for tournament	Previous club world championship finals
(England) Liverpool	UEFA	Winners of the 2018–19 UEFA Champions League	IC: 2 (1981, 1984); FCWC: 1 (2005)
(Brazil) Flamengo	CONMEBOL	Winners of the 2019 Copa Libertadores	IC: 1 (1981)

== Venue ==
The final took place at the Khalifa International Stadium in Al Rayyan, Qatar. The venue previously hosted matches at the 2011 AFC Asian Cup, including the final, and was chosen as a venue for the 2022 FIFA World Cup. Originally, the final (along with the second semi-final and third place match) was to be played at the Education City Stadium, also located in Al Rayyan. However, the matches were moved after the opening of the Education City Stadium was postponed to early 2020.

== Background ==
The final was a rematch of the 1981 Intercontinental Cup, recognised by FIFA as a club world championship. Flamengo won the match 3–0 for their only club world title. Flamengo hadn't reached the final since while Liverpool had participated in two world championship matches in 1984 and 2005, also losing both to Independiente and São Paulo respectively.

== Route to the final ==
(England) Liverpool		Team	(Brazil) Flamengo	
Opponent	Result	2019 FIFA Club World Cup	Opponent	Result
(Mexico) Monterrey	2–1	Semi-finals	(Saudi Arabia) Al-Hilal	3–1

=== Liverpool ===
Liverpool qualified for the Club World Cup as champions of the UEFA Champions League, having defeated Tottenham Hotspur in the final. The club had previously played in the 2005 Club World Championship, finishing as runners-up to São Paulo. Due to their participation in the tournament, Liverpool were forced to field a squad of youth players for an EFL Cup tie against Aston Villa due to the proximity of the two games, with the senior squad heading to Qatar to prepare while the reserves played in the cup game managed by U-23's manager Neil Critchley. As a result, they were beaten 5–0, the club's heaviest ever defeat in the competition

Liverpool entered with a bye to the semi-finals, where they faced North American champions Monterrey of Mexico. The Reds went ahead in the 12th minute with a strike by Naby Keïta, who collected a pass from Mohamed Salah at the right side of the box. Monterrey equalised two minutes later as Rogelio Funes Mori, who collected a rebound off Alisson's save of a volley taken by Jesús Gallardo. Liverpool had several chances to retake the lead and switched to a new formation after half-time, but were unable to score and left themselves open to counter-attacks. Substitute Roberto Firmino scored the winning goal for Liverpool in the first minute of stoppage time, tapping in a pass from Trent Alexander-Arnold within the six-yard box.

=== Flamengo ===
Flamengo qualified for the Club World Cup as winners of the Copa Libertadores, defeating River Plate with two last-minute goals by Gabriel Barbosa in the final, which was played a month before the Club World Cup.

Flamengo entered with a bye to their semi-final match against AFC Champions League winners Al Hilal of Saudi Arabia. Flamengo started poorly and nearly conceded to Bafétimbi Gomis in the 16th minute after a big rebound from goalkeeper Diego Alves. Two minutes later, Mohammed Al-Breik crossed low to Salem Al-Dawsari in the box who scored the opening goal. Flamengo did little to create good chances in the first half but returned with a different posture and higher defensive line in the second half. Within three minutes, Flamengo's attacking trio leveled the score: Gabriel Barbosa found Bruno Henrique open inside the box, who rolled the ball across to Giorgian De Arrascaeta for the equalizer. Diego came on in substitute for Gerson and initiated the play in the 78th minute that resulted in Rafinha's cross to Bruno Henrique for the go-ahead header. Three minutes later, Diego found Bruno Henrique in the box whose cross was deflected in by Ali Al-Bulaihi for an own-goal. Moments later, André Carrillo of Al-Hilal was sent off after hitting De Arrascaeta. Flamengo advanced with the 3–1 victory.

== Match ==
=== Summary ===
Roberto Firmino nearly scored for Liverpool in the first minute of the match, as the ball was lifted to him past the defense but his shot sailed high. Shortly after, Jordan Henderson and Trent Alexander-Arnold of Liverpool took shots of their own. Both teams continued equally matched, with Flamengo having a spell of possession after a rocky start and maintaining nearly sixty percent possession in the half. At the other end, Bruno Henrique had several sights of goal, though none quite as dangerous as Liverpool's.

Two minutes into the second half, Firmino nearly scored again, this time hitting the inside of the left post. In the 53rd minute, Flamengo's Gabriel Barbosa shot high, and later forced a diving save from goalkeeper Alisson with a shot from inside the 18-yard box. In the 73rd minute, Alex Oxlade-Chamberlain was injured and came off for Adam Lallana. Flamengo brought on Vitinho and Diego in place of Giorgian de Arrascaeta and Éverton Ribeiro. In the 83rd minute, Liverpool had their first dangerous shot on goal: a shot from Henderson fed by Mohamed Salah that was tipped over the frame by goalkeeper Diego Alves. Moments into stoppage time, Liverpool was awarded a penalty after Rafinha clipped the trailing foot of Sadio Mané free on goal on the edge of the penalty area. The decision was taken to video review where it appeared that the foul occurred outside the box and would result in a free kick, however the foul was waved off completely and play resumed with Flamengo. Regulation time ended with the match still scoreless.

In the 99th minute, Liverpool scored the breakthrough goal. Henderson played a long ball forward to Mané which Rodrigo Caio could not deflect. One-on-one with Rafinha, Mané played to an approaching Firmino on his left who hesitated and scored around Diego Alves. For Liverpool, James Milner came on for Naby Keïta, and for Flamengo Lincoln came on for midfielder Gerson. In the second period of extra time, Flamengo found one dangerous opportunity to equalize in the 119th minute when a Vitinho cross rebounded back to him off a defender and he picked out Lincoln whose shot sailed high from ten yards out. Minutes later, the match ended and Liverpool were victors by a score of 1–0.

=== Details ===
21 December 2019
20:30 AST

Liverpool (England)	1–0 (a.e.t.)	(Brazil) Flamengo
Firmino 99'	Report

Khalifa International Stadium, Al Rayyan
Attendance: 45,416
Referee: Abdulrahman Al-Jassim (Qatar)

Liverpool	Flamengo

GK	1	(Brazil) Alisson
RB	66	(England) Trent Alexander-Arnold
CB	12	(England) Joe Gomez
CB	4	(Netherlands) Virgil van Dijk
LB	26	(Scotland) Andy Robertson
CM	8	(Guinea) Naby Keïta		(substituted off) 100'
CM	14	(England) Jordan Henderson (c)
CM	15	(England) Alex Oxlade-Chamberlain		(substituted off) 75'
RF	11	(Egypt) Mohamed Salah	(yellow card) 81'	(substituted off) 120+1'
CF	9	(Brazil) Roberto Firmino	(yellow card) 100'	(substituted off) 106'
LF	10	(Senegal) Sadio Mané	(yellow card) 45+1'
Substitutes:
GK	13	(Spain) Adrián
GK	22	(England) Andy Lonergan
DF	51	(Netherlands) Ki-Jana Hoever
DF	72	(Netherlands) Sepp van den Berg
DF	76	(Wales) Neco Williams
MF	5	(Netherlands) Georginio Wijnaldum
MF	7	(England) James Milner	(yellow card) 105'	(substituted on) 100'
MF	20	(England) Adam Lallana		(substituted on) 75'
MF	48	(England) Curtis Jones
FW	23	(Switzerland) Xherdan Shaqiri		(substituted on) 120+1'
FW	27	(Belgium) Divock Origi		(substituted on) 106'
FW	67	(England) Harvey Elliott
Manager:
(Germany) Jürgen Klopp

GK	1	(Brazil) Diego Alves
RB	13	(Brazil) Rafinha
CB	3	(Brazil) Rodrigo Caio
CB	4	(Spain) Pablo Marí
LB	16	(Brazil) Filipe Luís
CM	5	(Brazil) Willian Arão		(substituted off) 120'
CM	8	(Brazil) Gerson		(substituted off) 102'
RW	7	(Brazil) Éverton Ribeiro (c)		(substituted off) 82'
AM	14	(Uruguay) Giorgian de Arrascaeta		(substituted off) 77'
LW	27	(Brazil) Bruno Henrique
CF	9	(Brazil) Gabriel Barbosa
Substitutes:
GK	22	(Brazil) Gabriel Batista
GK	37	(Brazil) César
DF	2	(Brazil) Rodinei
DF	6	(Brazil) Renê
DF	26	(Brazil) Matheus Thuler
DF	44	(Brazil) Rhodolfo
MF	10	(Brazil) Diego	(yellow card) 112'	(substituted on) 82'
MF	19	(Brazil) Reinier
MF	25	(Paraguay) Robert Piris Da Motta
MF	28	(Colombia) Orlando Berrío		(substituted on) 120'
FW	11	(Brazil) Vitinho	(yellow card) 90'	(substituted on) 77'
FW	29	(Brazil) Lincoln		(substituted on) 102'
Manager:
(Portugal) Jorge Jesus

Man of the Match:
Roberto Firmino (Liverpool)

Assistant referees:
Taleb Al-Marri (Qatar)
Saoud Al-Maqaleh (Qatar)
Fourth official:
Mustapha Ghorbal (Algeria)
Reserve assistant referee:
Mokrane Gourari (Algeria)
Video assistant referees:
Juan Martínez Munuera (Spain)
Assistant video assistant referees:
Esteban Ostojich (Uruguay)
Kyle Atkins (United States)
Bakary Gassama (Gambia)

Match rules

- 90 minutes.
- 30 minutes of extra time if necessary.
- Penalty shoot-out if scores still level.
- Maximum of twelve named substitutes.
- Maximum of three substitutions, with a fourth allowed in extra time.

=== Statistics ===
Overall
Statistic	Liverpool	Flamengo
Goals scored	1	0
Total shots	18	14
Shots on target	6	2
Saves	2	5
Ball possession	48%	52%
Corner kicks	5	7
Fouls committed	22	16
Offsides	3	6
Yellow cards	4	2
Red cards	0	0

== Post-match ==
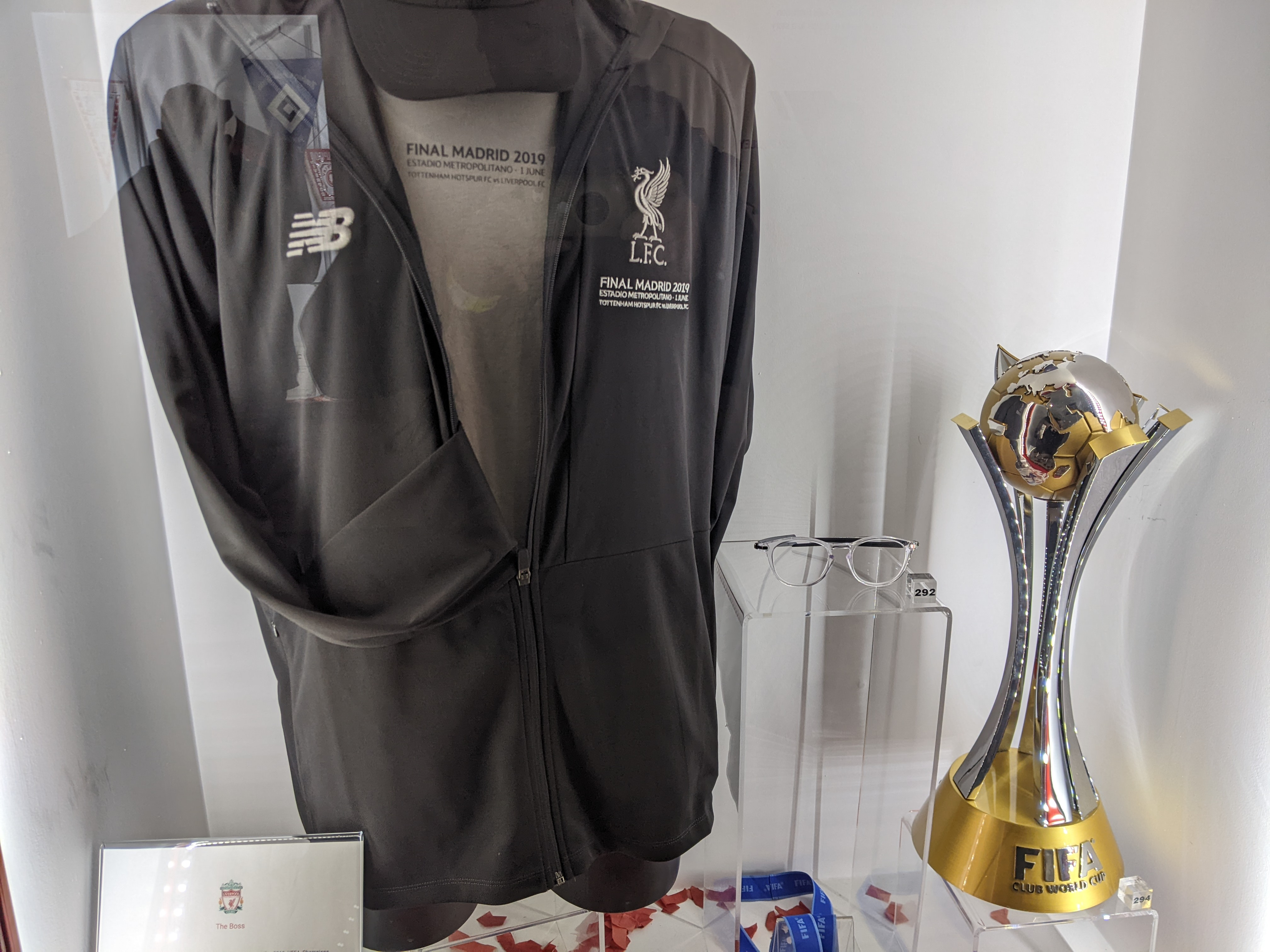
The FIFA Club World Cup trophy next to Jürgen Klopp's tracksuit top (from the 2019 Champions League final) in the Liverpool F.C. museum

With the win, Liverpool secured their first Club World Cup title, becoming the second English club to win the competition after Manchester United in 2008. Liverpool's Roberto Firmino was given the man of the match award, while teammate Mohamed Salah was awarded the Golden Ball by FIFA's Technical Study Group, which was jointly awarded with the Alibaba Cloud Player of the Tournament award. Flamengo's Bruno Henrique won the tournament's Silver Ball award.

== See also ==
- Liverpool F.C. in international football
- 1981 Intercontinental Cup — contested between same teams
