= Liverpool F.C. in international football =

English club in international football

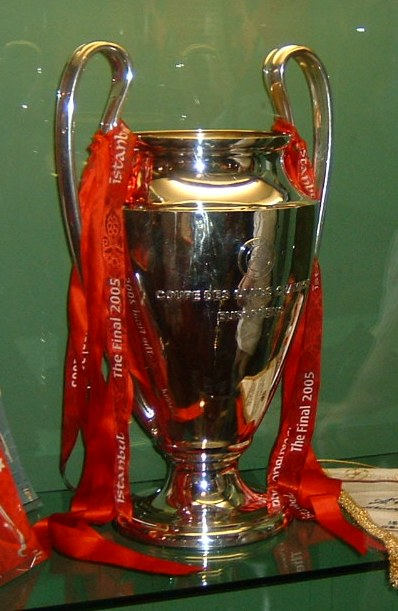
- The European Champion Clubs' Cup trophy won by Liverpool for a fifth time in 2005
- Club: Liverpool F.C.
- Seasons played: 51
- Most appearances: Jamie Carragher (150)
- Top scorer: Mohamed Salah (53)
- First entry: 1964–65 European Cup
- Latest entry: 2026–27 UEFA Champions League

Titles
- Champions League: 6: 1977; 1978; 1981; 1984; 2005; 2019
- Europa League: 3: 1973; 1976; 2001
- Super Cup: 4: 1977; 2001; 2005; 2019
- FIFA Club World Cup: 1: 2019

Liverpool Football Club is a professional association football club in Union of European Football Associations (UEFA) competitions. Since 1964, they have won fourteen European and Worldwide trophies, more than any other British club. These consist of the UEFA Champions League (formerly known as the European Cup) six times, the UEFA Europa League (formerly the UEFA Cup) three times, the UEFA Super Cup four times and the FIFA Club World Cup once.

Qualification for European competitions is determined by a team's success in its domestic league and cup competitions from the previous season. Liverpool competed in European competitions for 21 consecutive seasons until the 1985 European Cup final, the occasion of the Heysel Stadium disaster, following which the club was banned from European competitions for six seasons. Since being readmitted in 1991, they have qualified for the UEFA Champions League (the successor to the European Cup) fifteen times, the UEFA Europa League (the successor to the UEFA Cup) twelve times, and the (now-defunct) UEFA Cup Winners' Cup twice.

As a result of their victory in the 2005 Champions League final, Liverpool won the European Champion Clubs' Cup trophy outright and were awarded a multiple winner badge. Only two teams have won more Champions League titles than Liverpool: Real Madrid and AC Milan with fifteen and seven, respectively. Liverpool's total of three UEFA Cup wins has been bettered only by Sevilla, who have won the competition seven times. They have also won the UEFA Super Cup on four occasions; only Barcelona, Milan and Real Madrid (five each) have won the competition more. Liverpool won the FIFA Club World Cup for the first time in 2019.

Bob Paisley is the club's most successful manager in Europe, with five trophies. Liverpool's biggest-margin win in Europe is an 11–0 victory over Strømsgodset in the 1974–75 European Cup Winners' Cup. In European competitions, Jamie Carragher holds the club record for the most appearances, with 150, and Mohamed Salah is the club's record goalscorer, with 50 goals.

== Background ==
Club competitions between teams from different European countries can trace their origins as far back as 1897 when the Challenge Cup was created for clubs in the Austro-Hungarian Empire, who did not meet under normal circumstances. The Sir Thomas Lipton Trophy, named after entrepreneur and sportsman Thomas Lipton, was established in 1909 and was contested between clubs from Italy, Great Britain, Germany and Switzerland; the competition lasted for two years. The earliest attempt to create a cup for national champion clubs of Europe was made by Swiss club FC Servette. Founded in 1930, the Coupe des Nations featured clubs of ten major European football leagues and was deemed a success. Due to financial reasons, the competition was abandoned.

The first continental competition organised by UEFA was the European Cup in 1955. Conceived by Gabriel Hanot, the editor of L'Équipe, as a competition for winners of the European national football leagues, it is considered the most prestigious European football competition. When the European Cup was first played, Liverpool were in the Second Division, following relegation from the First Division after the 1953–54 season, and thus were ineligible for the competition. During their time in the Second Division, two further competitions were created: the Inter-Cities Fairs Cup and UEFA Cup Winners' Cup. The UEFA Cup Winners' Cup was inaugurated in 1960 for the winners of domestic cup competitions.

In 1962, Liverpool were promoted to the First Division. Two years later, they won the Football League championship, thus making their European debut in the 1964–65 European Cup. In the following years, further European competitions were inaugurated. The first, the UEFA Super Cup, was originally a match played between the winners of the European Cup and the Cup Winners' Cup. First established in 1973, it changed formats in 2000; since then, it has been contested between the winners of the Champions League (formerly the European Cup) and the Europa League (formerly the UEFA Cup), following the Cup Winners' Cup amalgamation into the latter. The Intercontinental Cup was a competition for the winners of the European Cup (later, the UEFA Champions League) and the South American equivalent, the Copa Libertadores. Established in 1960, the Intercontinental Cup was jointly organised by UEFA and the Confederación Sudamericana de Fútbol (CONMEBOL). It ran until 2004, when the FIFA Club World Cup, which includes the winners of all six confederations' regional championships replaced it.

== History ==
=== First steps in Europe – the Shankly years (1965–74) ===
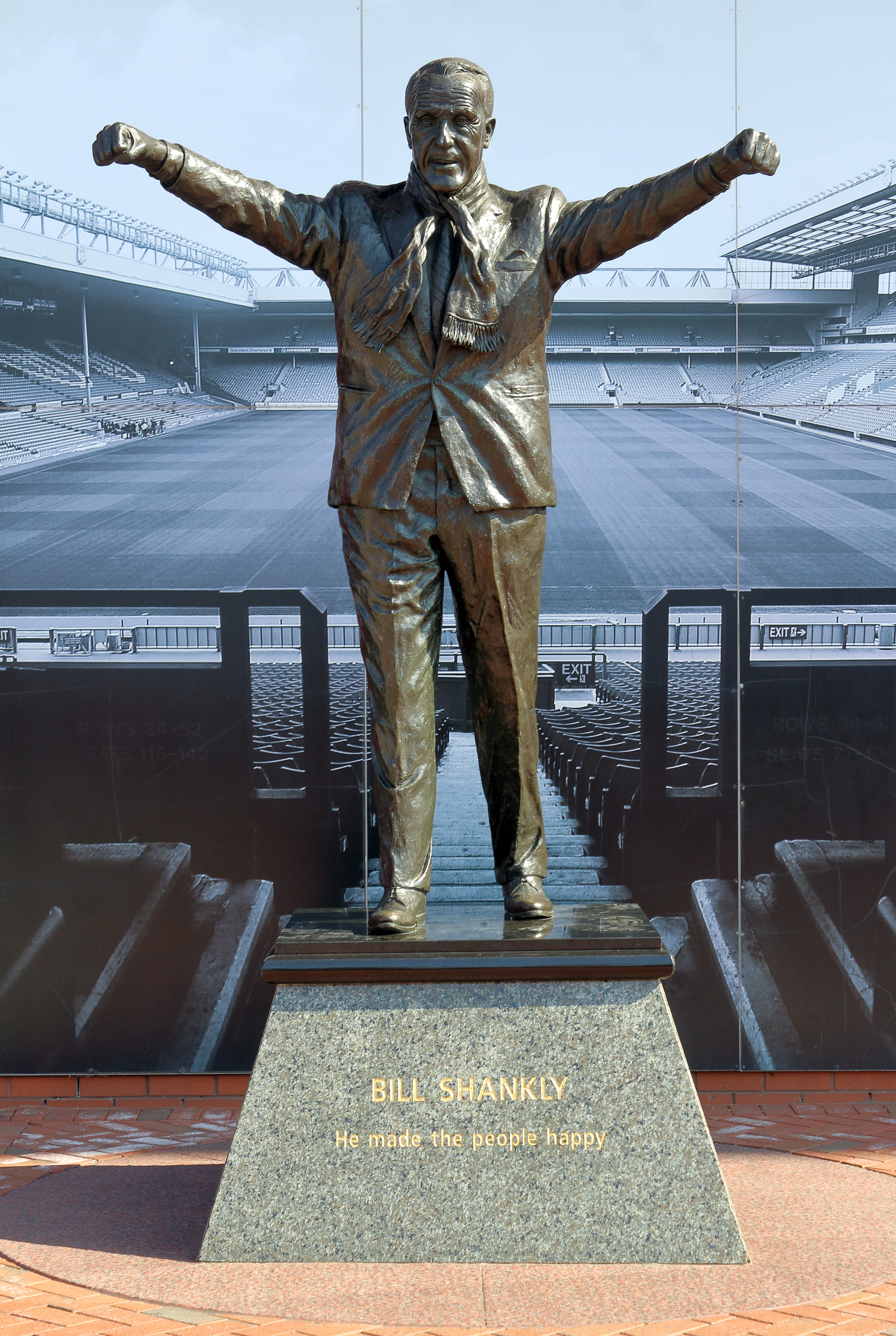
Statue of Bill Shankly outside Anfield. Shankly was the first Liverpool manager to win a European trophy.

Bill Shankly began managing Liverpool in 1959, and it was under him that the team first competed in European competition in 1964–65, qualifying for the European Cup by winning the First Division championship the previous season. The club's first opponents were KR Reykjavík of Iceland, who they played in the preliminary round. Liverpool won 11–1 on aggregate. The next round, against Belgian club Anderlecht, was the first time in Liverpool's history that they wore their now common all-red strip. The decision was made to change from red shirts, white shorts and socks by Shankly, who wanted his players to make more of a psychological impact on opponents. They beat Anderlecht and progressed to the semi-finals, where they met Italian team Inter Milan. Before the first leg at Anfield, Shankly asked two injured players to parade the FA Cup, which Liverpool had won the previous week, to intimidate the Italians. The team won the match 3–1, but Inter won the second leg 3–0, securing a 4–3 aggregate victory. The second leg was controversial; Shankly described it as "a war". He felt that the referee, José María Ortiz de Mendíbil, had shown bias towards Inter, and the Liverpool players felt cheated by his decisions. The club's 1964–65 FA Cup victory ensured qualification for the UEFA Cup Winners' Cup the following season, and in that competition, they reached their first European final. Borussia Dortmund, Liverpool's opponents, employed counter-attacking tactics that had paid dividends in previous rounds and did so again, with the West Germans beating Liverpool 2–1 after extra time. Striker, Roger Hunt, described the defeat as "an off night" and said, "it was probably the most disappointing defeat over the years because we just didn't play.

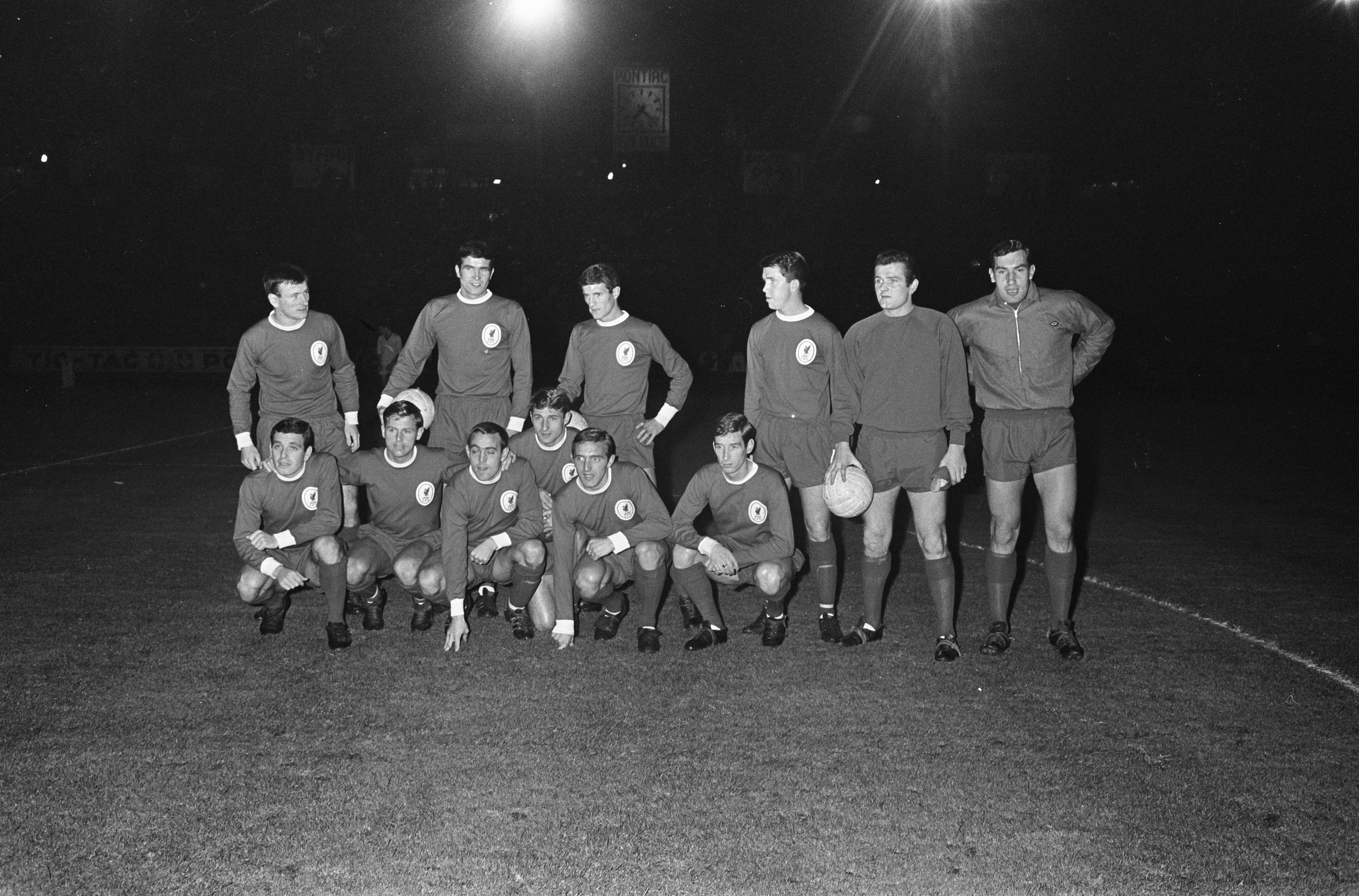
Liverpool face Petrolul in the first round of the 1966–67 European Cup.

In the next four seasons, they competed in the European Cup and Inter-Cities Fairs Cup, but failed to progress past the third round in either competition. A tie against Dutch team Ajax during the 1966–67 European Cup was to prove pivotal in the history of Liverpool in European competition. Ajax beat Liverpool 7–3 on aggregate. However, the style of football that Ajax played – a patient passing game, inspired by Johann Cruyff – convinced Shankly that Liverpool had to replicate this style to be successful in Europe. Liverpool reached the semi-finals of the 1970–71 Inter-Cities Fairs Cup, losing 1–0 on aggregate to Leeds United. They competed in the 1971–72 European Cup Winners' Cup, despite losing the 1971 FA Cup Final, as the FA Cup winners, Arsenal, had also qualified for the European Cup by winning the league championship. Liverpool were eliminated in the second round by Bayern Munich of Germany, losing 3–1 on aggregate.

The changes made to Liverpool's tactics came to fruition during the 1972–73 UEFA Cup. The club reached their second European final, where they faced Borussia Mönchengladbach of Germany. Liverpool won the first leg 3–0 as a result of two goals from Kevin Keegan and one from Larry Lloyd. Victory in this first leg meant Liverpool only needed to avoid losing by three or more goals in order to win the final. This influenced their tactics – The Times reported that Liverpool employed a "holding action" against the "attacking Germans". The tactics worked, allowing Mönchengladbach only two goals, granting Liverpool a 3–2 aggregate victory. Liverpool also won the First Division championship that season, and as a result, qualified for the 1973–74 European Cup, where they were eliminated in the second round by Red Star Belgrade of Yugoslavia. The defeat marked a shift in emphasis in the style of Liverpool's play to a more patient approach. At the end of that season, Shankly retired.

=== European domination – the Paisley years (1974–83) ===
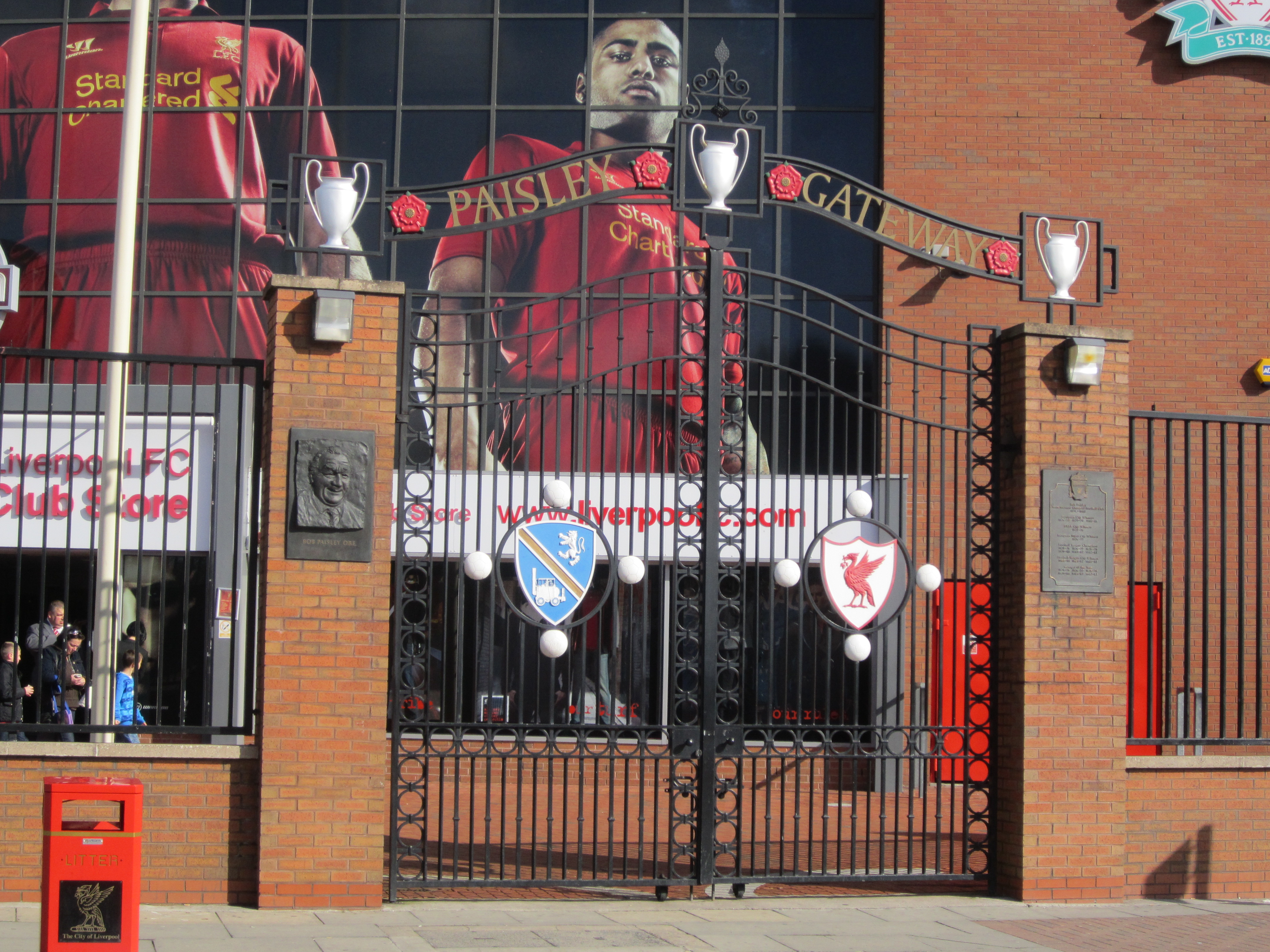
The Paisley Gateway is a tribute to former manager Bob Paisley, who won a record three European Cups—and three European trophies in successive seasons—as Liverpool manager.

Shankly was succeeded by his assistant, Bob Paisley, in 1974. Liverpool competed in the Cup Winners' Cup during Paisley's first season and defeated Strømsgodset of Norway 11–0 at Anfield. This remains the club's largest margin of victory in all matches. They lost in the next round to Hungarian side Ferencváros on the away goals rule. In 1975–76, the club entered the UEFA Cup after a second-place finish in the First Division. Victories over Hibernian (Scotland), Real Sociedad (Spain), Śląsk Wrocław (Poland), Dynamo Dresden (East Germany) and Barcelona (Spain) took Liverpool to their third European final. Crucial to their progress was goalkeeper Ray Clemence, who made two important penalty saves against Hibernian and Dresden, saving Liverpool from elimination on the away goals rule on both occasions. Their opponents in the final were Club Brugge of Belgium. Liverpool recovered from a two-goal deficit to win the first leg at Anfield 3–2, with Ray Kennedy, Jimmy Case, and Keegan scoring a goal each in a span of six minutes. A 1–1 draw at the Jan Breydel Stadion in Bruges meant Liverpool won 4–3 on aggregate, earning their second UEFA Cup.

As the 1975–76 league champions, the club entered the 1976–77 European Cup. They defeated Crusaders of Northern Ireland and Trabzonspor of Turkey to reach the quarter-finals, where they faced the runners-up from the previous season, Saint-Étienne. The French team won the first leg 1–0. The second leg at Anfield began well for Liverpool when Keegan scored in the first two minutes. Saint-Étienne equalised to make the score 2–1 on aggregate in their favour. Kennedy scored for Liverpool, but the away goals rule meant they still needed another goal to win the tie. With six minutes remaining, David Fairclough was brought on to replace John Toshack; he immediately scored in front of the Kop, ensuring a 3–2 aggregate victory for Liverpool. In the semi-finals, they defeated FC Zürich of Switzerland 6–1 on aggregate to reach the final, where they met their opponents from the 1973 UEFA Cup Final, Borussia Mönchengladbach. The final was held in Rome, four days after the club had lost the 1977 FA Cup Final to Manchester United. Before the match, Paisley announced that striker Toshack would be fit to start. However, he was not named in the matchday squad. This change upset the Germans' game plan and allowed Keegan to torment his marker, Berti Vogts. Liverpool won 3–1 to become European champions for the first time.

By winning the European Cup, they qualified for the European Super Cup and played the winners of the Cup Winners' Cup, German team Hamburg SV, who had just signed Keegan. Liverpool won the tie 7–1 on aggregate. Liverpool entered the 1977–78 European Cup as champions and received a bye in the first round. They defeated Dynamo Dresden and Portuguese team Benfica in the second round and quarter-finals, respectively. In the semi-final, the club again met Borussia Mönchengladbach, who won the first leg 2–1. Liverpool won the second leg 3–0, progressing to a second successive European Cup final, this time against Club Brugge at Wembley Stadium in London. In the final Kenny Dalglish, who had been signed to replace Keegan, scored the winning goal after receiving the ball from a Graeme Souness pass. The 1–0 victory meant Liverpool became the first British team to retain the European Cup. They faced Anderlecht in the 1978 European Super Cup, but failed to retain the trophy, losing 4–3 on aggregate against the Belgian side. Liverpool were eliminated in the first round of the 1978–79 European Cup by English champions Nottingham Forest. Nottingham Forest won the tie 2–0 on aggregate and went on to win the competition. Liverpool entered the 1979–80 European Cup as English champions but were again eliminated in the first round, this time beaten 4–2 on aggregate by Dinamo Tbilisi of the Soviet Union.

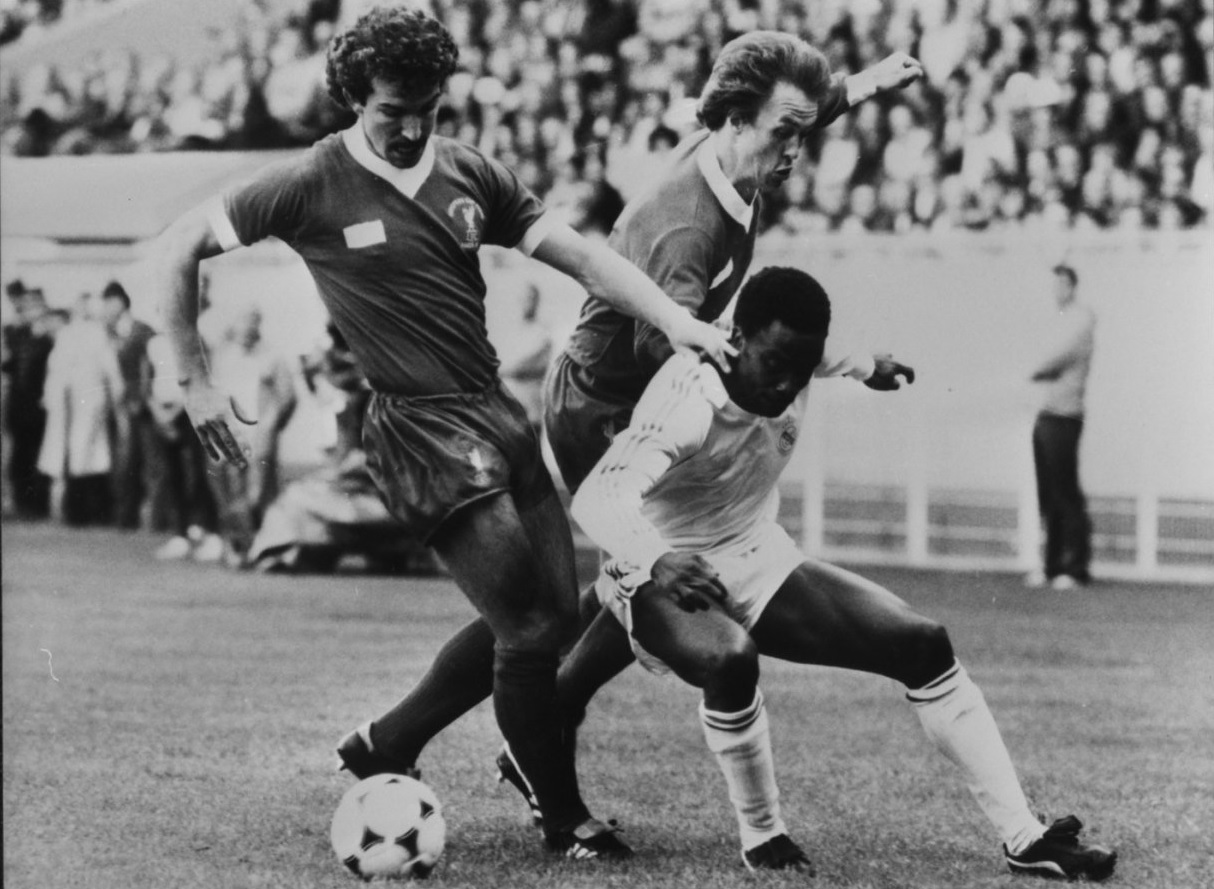
Liverpool beat Real Madrid 1–0 in 1981 to win their third European Cup

Liverpool participated in the 1980–81 European Cup as English league champions, defeating Finnish champions Oulun Palloseura, Scottish club Aberdeen and CSKA Sofia of Bulgaria to qualify for the semi-finals, where they faced three-time champions Bayern Munich. The first leg at Anfield finished goalless. In the second leg at the Olympiastadion in Munich, Ray Kennedy scored in the 83rd minute and, although the German side equalised, Liverpool went through to the final on the away goals rule. They faced Spanish side Real Madrid in the final, held at the Parc des Princes in Paris. Alan Kennedy scored the only goal to give Liverpool a 1–0 victory, which secured the club's—and Paisley's—third European Cup. As champions of Europe, Liverpool competed in the Intercontinental Cup against South American champions Flamengo of Brazil. Liverpool lost the match 3–0. The club's defence of the European Cup in 1981–82 was ended by CSKA Sofia in the quarter-finals. Another quarter-final exit occurred in the 1982–83 European Cup when Polish club Widzew Łódź eliminated Liverpool 4–3 on aggregate. Paisley retired as manager at the end of the season and was succeeded by his assistant, Joe Fagan.

=== Triumph and tragedy – the Fagan years (1983–85) ===
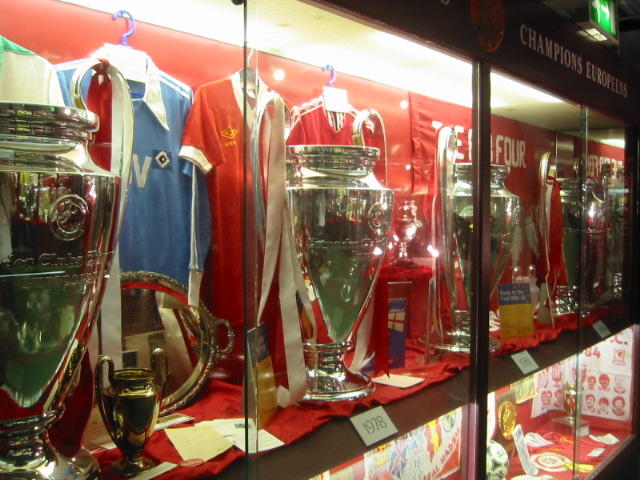
Replicas of the four European Cups Liverpool won from 1977 to 1984 on display in the club's museum

Liverpool entered the 1983–84 European Cup as league champions for the fourth time in five seasons. Victories over Odense of Denmark and Spanish champions Athletic Bilbao brought Liverpool to face Portuguese champions Benfica in the quarter-finals. Liverpool won the first leg at Anfield 1–0. In the second leg, their tactic of withdrawing Dalglish into midfield put Benfica's game plan into disarray, leading to a 4–1 match victory and a 5–1 aggregate victory. Their opponents in the semi-finals were Dinamo București of Romania. The tie proved a brutal encounter, characterised by Souness breaking the jaw of the Bucharest captain Lică Movilă, and was won 3–1 on aggregate by Liverpool.

Fagan's first season in charge of Liverpool had been a successful one. When they reached their fourth European Cup final, they had already won the Football League Cup and the league championship; victory in the European final against Italian side AS Roma would complete an unprecedented treble. The final was played at Rome's Stadio Olimpico, and Liverpool went ahead in the 13th minute when Phil Neal scored, though Roma equalised towards the end of the first half. The score remained the same throughout full and extra time; Liverpool won the subsequent penalty shoot-out, with Alan Kennedy scoring the winning penalty after goalkeeper Bruce Grobbelaar had put off Francesco Graziani, causing him to place his penalty over the crossbar. After the game, gangs of Roma fans assaulted Liverpool supporters travelling back to their hotels. Success in the European Cup entitled Liverpool to compete in the 1984 Intercontinental Cup. However, they were unable to beat the winners of the Copa Libertadores, Independiente of Argentina, who claimed a 1–0 victory.

Liverpool entered the 1984–85 European Cup as champions, and once again progressed to the final, where their opponents were Juventus of Italy. They aimed to win their fifth European Cup and keep the trophy. The 1985 European Cup Final was held at the Heysel Stadium in Brussels. The choice of venue had been criticised due to the dilapidated state of the stadium, and the club tried to persuade UEFA to change the venue. Before the kick-off, Liverpool fans breached a fence separating the two groups of supporters and charged the Juventus fans. The resulting weight of people caused a retaining wall to collapse, killing 39 people and injuring hundreds more. Despite calls for an abandonment, the match was played, as it was felt that further trouble would be caused otherwise.

Juventus won the match 1–0; Michel Platini scored from the penalty spot to give Juventus their first European Cup. UEFA laid the blame for the incident solely on the Liverpool fans: the official UEFA observer stated, "Only the English fans were responsible. Of that there is no doubt". Three days after the final, UEFA banned all English clubs from European competition for an indefinite period. Liverpool were initially given an additional three-year ban. Fagan retired after the 1984–85 season and was succeeded by Dalglish, who took over as player-manager.

The ban on English clubs in European competitions ultimately lasted for five years, and even when the ban was lifted in 1990, Liverpool were not re-admitted; they had to serve an extra year. The ban prevented them qualifying for the European Cup in 1986, 1988 and 1990 (as league champions), the UEFA Cup in 1987 (as league runners-up), and the European Cup Winners' Cup in 1989 (as FA Cup winners). The only international matches of a somewhat competitive nature played in that time were in the Dubai Champions Cup against the champions of Scotland; Liverpool defeated Celtic on penalties in December 1986, then lost to the same opposition by the same method in April 1989, nine days prior to the Hillsborough disaster.

=== Return to Europe (1991–2004) ===
Liverpool were allowed to return to European competition in the 1991–92 season, a year later than other English clubs. They qualified for the UEFA Cup as runners-up in the English league. Their manager by this stage was Graeme Souness, who had taken over towards the end of the previous season following Dalglish's resignation. Their first match, in the UEFA Cup, was against Finnish side Kuusyi Lahti, which they won 6–1. A 6–2 aggregate victory set up a tie against Auxerre of France in the second round who they beat 3–2 on aggregate. The club defeated Swarovski Tirol of Austria in the third round 6–0 on aggregate before losing to Genoa (Italy) 4–1 over two legs in the quarter-finals.

Liverpool's victory over Sunderland in the 1992 FA Cup Final qualified them for the 1992–93 European Cup Winners' Cup, but this campaign was short-lived, as they were eliminated in the second round by Russian side Spartak Moscow. Liverpool finished no higher than sixth in the Premier League during the next two seasons, thus failing to qualify for European competition. In the 1995–96 season, they entered the UEFA Cup, but again progressed no further than the second round, this time losing to Brøndby of Denmark.

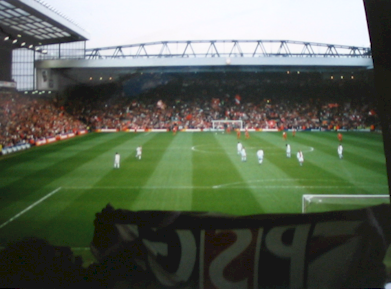
Paris SG halted Liverpool's progress at the semi-final stage of the 1996–97 UEFA Cup Winners' Cup.

As runners-up to League champions Manchester United in the 1996 FA Cup Final, Liverpool were able to compete in the 1996–97 UEFA Cup Winners' Cup. This proved the club's most successful campaign since their return to European competition, as they reached the semi-finals, where they were eliminated 3–2 on aggregate by Paris Saint–Germain. In the next two seasons, Liverpool played in the UEFA Cup but were eliminated at an early stage of the competition, by Strasbourg and Celta Vigo, respectively. A seventh-place finish in the 1998–99 FA Premier League meant the club did not qualify for Europe in 1999–2000.

Having finished fourth in the 1999–2000 FA Premier League, Liverpool qualified for the 2000–01 UEFA Cup. Their victory in this competition marked a third win for a club. The entire season was the club's most successful since the 1983–84 season, as they won a cup treble consisting of the UEFA Cup, the FA Cup and the League Cup. Their opponents in the final in Dortmund were Alavés of Spain. The match was tied at 4–4 in extra time when Alavés defender Delfí Geli scored an own goal to give Liverpool victory on the golden goal rule. The performance of Gary McAllister, whose free-kick resulted in the winning goal, was praised as "outstanding" by Trevor Brooking. This was the club's first European trophy since their European Cup victory in 1984. As UEFA Cup winners, Liverpool played in the 2001 UEFA Super Cup against Champions League winners Bayern Munich and won 3–2.

In the 2001–02 season, Liverpool returned to the European Cup, now called the UEFA Champions League, for the first time since the Heysel disaster. A 2–0 victory over AS Roma in the second group stage meant they progressed to the quarter-finals. They faced German club Bayer Leverkusen and won the first leg 1–0. The outlook for the second leg appeared to be to Liverpool's advantage, as their counter-attacking style of play had served them well during away matches throughout the season; however, they lost the second leg 4–2 and were eliminated 4–3 on aggregate.

A second-place finish in the 2001–02 FA Premier League entitled Liverpool to participate in the Champions League for a second successive season, but they only finished third in their group and were eliminated from the competition. The third-place finish meant they entered the 2002–03 UEFA Cup. Liverpool beat Dutch team Vitesse Arnhem and Auxerre to set up an all-British tie with Scottish team Celtic. A 1–1 draw in the first leg meant Liverpool would progress to the semi-finals if they did not concede a goal in the second leg at Anfield. However, Celtic scored before half-time and again in the second half to win 3–1 on aggregate.

Liverpool entered the UEFA Cup for the 2003–04 season, after Chelsea beat them on the final day of the previous league season to claim the fourth place needed to qualify for the Champions League. Liverpool were eliminated in the fourth round by eventual runners-up Marseille of France. At the end of the season, manager Gérard Houllier was replaced by Rafael Benítez.

=== Renewed European success – the Benítez years (2004–10) ===
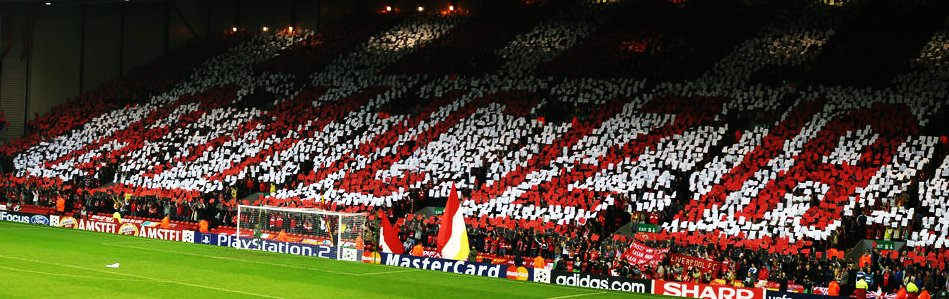
Fans in the Kop hold a mosaic during the match with Juventus, 6 April 2005. Amicizia means "friendship" in Italian.

Liverpool had finished fourth in the 2003–04 season, which qualified them to compete in the Champions League in the 2004–05 season. A poor start in the group stages, with two losses in their first five games, had the club facing elimination. A 3–1 victory over Greek side Olympiakos, however, eventually ensured their passage to the knock-out rounds. Liverpool beat Bayer Leverkusen and Juventus to reach the semi-finals, and progressed to the final after they beat Chelsea 1–0 on aggregate; the goal scored by Luis García was referred to as a "ghost goal" by Chelsea manager José Mourinho, as it was unclear whether the ball crossed the goal line. Liverpool's performances in Europe contrasted strongly with their league form, where they struggled to finish in the top-four and thus ensure qualification for the next Champions League season.

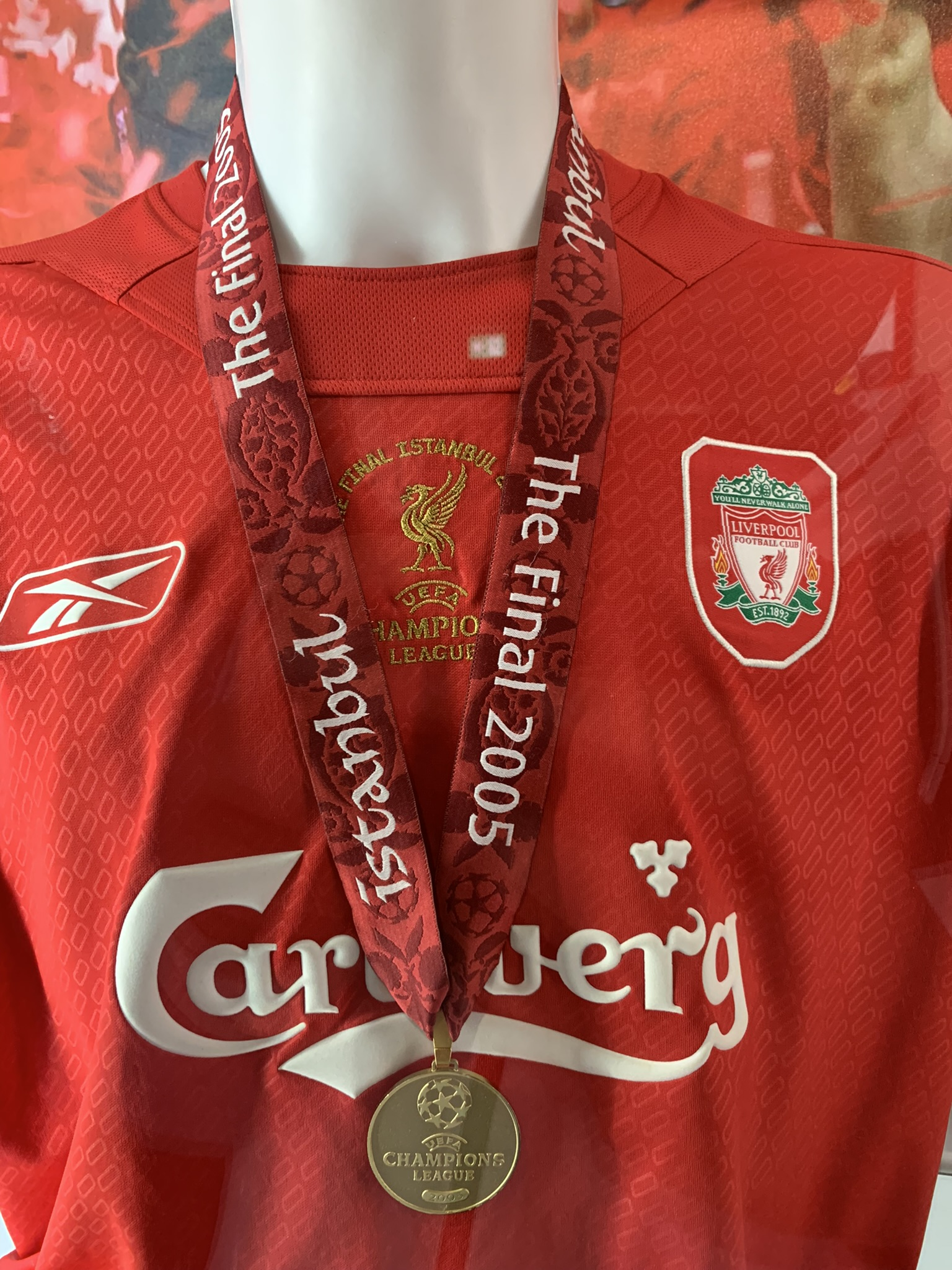
Liverpool shirt and winners medal from the 2005 UEFA Champions League final in the club's museum

Liverpool faced six-time European champions AC Milan in the final at the Atatürk Stadium in Istanbul on 25 May 2005. Trailing 3–0 at half-time, they scored three goals in a six-minute spell in the second half to level the score at 3–3. There were no goals during extra time, so the match was decided by a penalty shoot-out. With the shoot-out score at 3–2, Liverpool goalkeeper Jerzy Dudek saved Andriy Shevchenko's penalty to give Liverpool victory. The nature of Liverpool's comeback victory has led to the match being referred to as the "miracle of Istanbul." As this was the club's fifth European Cup victory, Liverpool were allowed to keep the European Champion Clubs' Cup permanently, and a new trophy was commissioned for the following year's competition. The victory also entitled Liverpool to compete in the 2005 UEFA Super Cup at Stade Louis II, Monaco in August. They defeated UEFA Cup winners CSKA Moscow of Russia 3–1 (a.e.t.) to win their third Super Cup. Their success in the Champions League meant Liverpool also qualified for the 2005 FIFA Club World Championship, where they lost 1–0 in the final to Brazilian team São Paulo.

A fifth-place finish in the Premier League in 2004–05 meant Liverpool were not guaranteed entry into the Champions League, and faced the prospect of not being able to defend their European title. UEFA eventually ruled that they were allowed to defend their title but have to start in the first qualifying round, with no country protection, meaning they could face any team from England in any round. This turned out to be the case — Liverpool advanced through three qualifying rounds and were drawn with Chelsea in the group stages. They progressed from their group as winners but were beaten by Benfica in the first knock-out round.

In the 2006–07 Champions League, Liverpool progressed from the group stages and beat holders Barcelona, PSV and Chelsea to face Milan in a rematch of the 2005 final. The Liverpool team, which contained only five players from the 2005 final, enjoyed more possession than in 2005, but two goals from Filippo Inzaghi gave Milan their seventh European Cup in a 2–1 win.

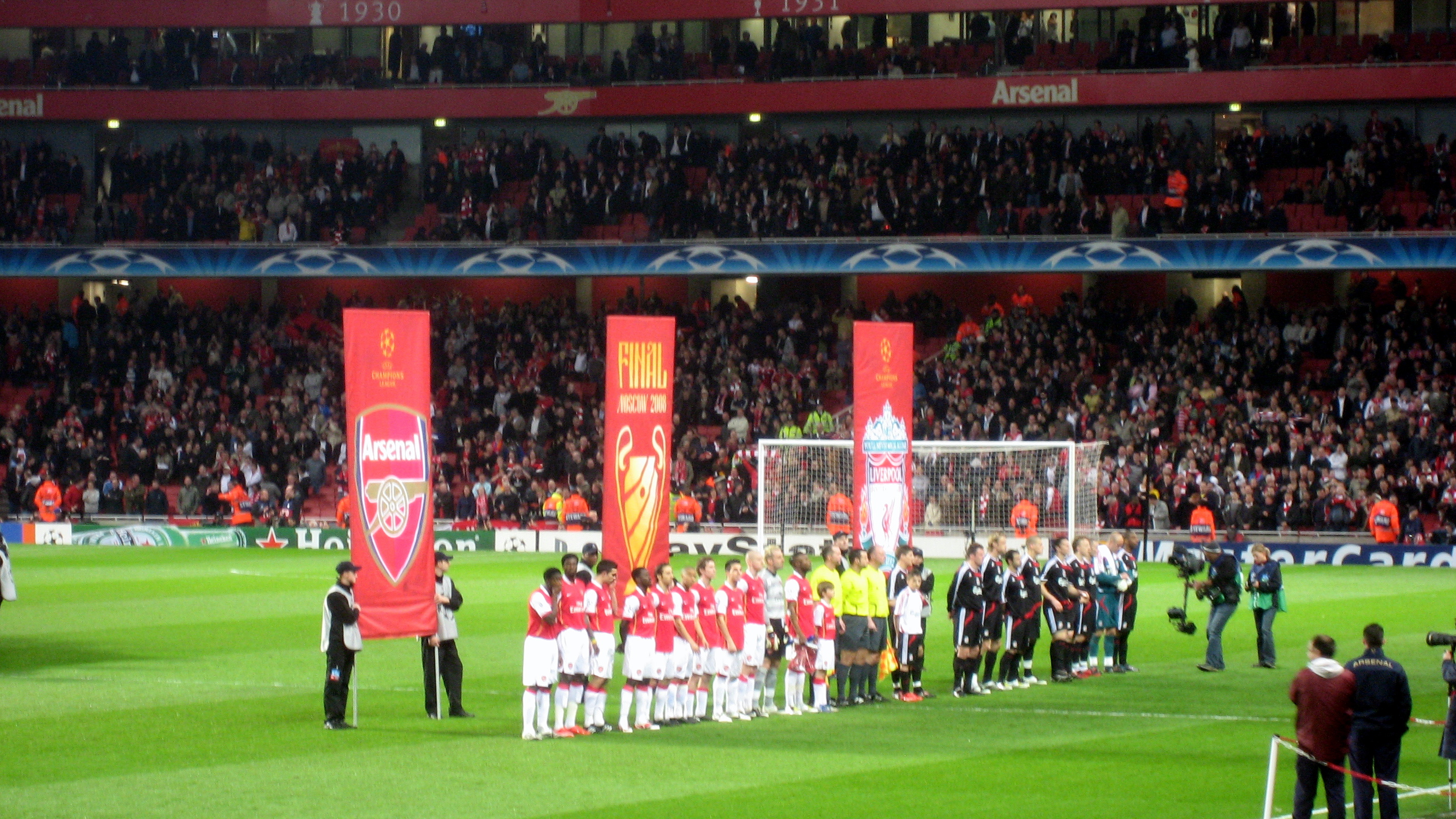
Liverpool lining up at Arsenal in the quarter-finals of the 2007–08 UEFA Champions League

Liverpool were eliminated from the 2007–08 Champions League in the semi-finals by Chelsea, who they had beaten in the semi-finals in 2005 and 2007. A fourth-place finish in the 2007–08 Premier League secured their entry into the 2008–09 Champions League. Liverpool reached the quarter-finals and again faced Chelsea, but lost 7–5 on aggregate.

A second-place finish in the 2008–09 Premier League entitled Liverpool to compete in the 2009–10 UEFA Champions League, but their campaign was short-lived; they finished third in their group, and were eliminated from the competition. They entered the 2009–10 UEFA Europa League, progressing to the semi-finals, where they were eliminated by eventual winners Atlético Madrid of Spain on the away goals rule after the tie finished 2–2 on aggregate.

=== Decline (2010–15) ===
Rafael Benítez left the club at the end of the 2009–10 season and was replaced by Roy Hodgson. A seventh-place finish in the 2009–10 Premier League meant Liverpool would be competing in the 2010–11 Europa League. They beat Rabotnički of Macedonia and Trabzonspor of Turkey to progress to the group stage, where Liverpool were drawn alongside Napoli, FC Utrecht and Steaua București. They won two games and drew four to finish top of their group with ten points and progress to the round of 32. They were drawn against Sparta Prague in the next round. Before the tie was played, however, Hodgson was replaced by former manager Kenny Dalglish, who initially served as a caretaker manager. A 1–0 aggregate victory ensured progression to the round of 16, in which Liverpool lost 1–0 on aggregate to eventual runners-up Braga. A sixth-place finish in the 2010–11 Premier League meant the club failed to qualify for European competition for the first time since 1999. On the following season, victory in the League Cup final ensured Liverpool a place in the 2012–13 Europa League.

Liverpool qualified for the knockout phase of the 2012–13 Europa League after winning their group at the group stage, but were eliminated from the competition at the round of 32 by Zenit Saint Petersburg on the away goals rule after a 0–2 loss away and a 3–1 win at home. A seventh-place finish in the 2012–13 Premier League and a failure to secure qualification via domestic cups meant Liverpool failed to qualify for any European competition in the 2013–14 season. A second-placed finish in the 2013–14 Premier League, ensured Liverpool qualified for the group stage of the 2014–15 Champions League. One win out of six in the group stage meant they were eliminated and demoted to the knockout phase of the 2014–15 Europa League. The campaign was short-lived, as Liverpool were eliminated by Beşiktaş in the round of 32.

=== Resurgence – the Klopp years (2015–2024) ===
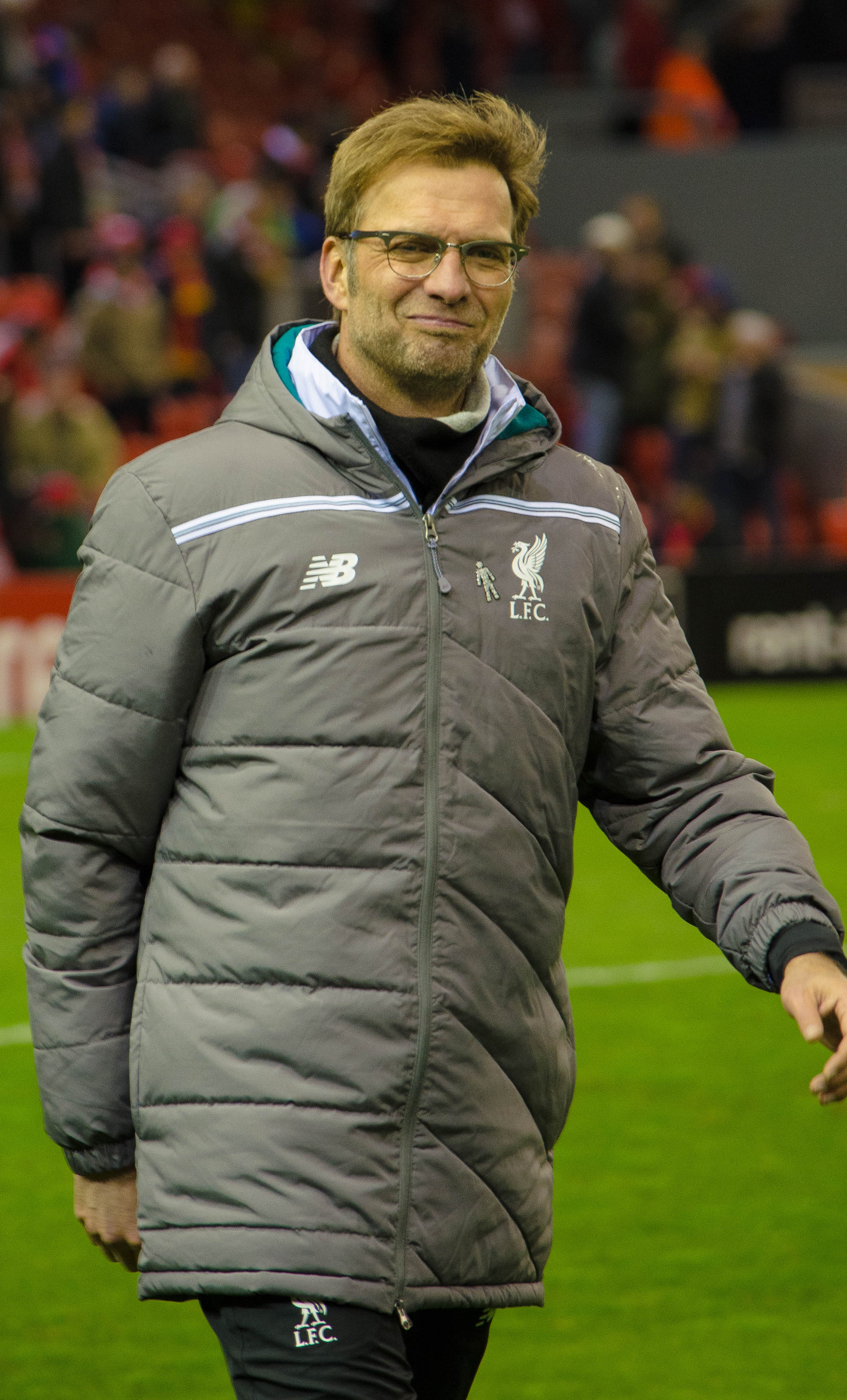
Jürgen Klopp managing Liverpool in a 2015–16 UEFA Europa League match against FC Augsburg.

Finishing sixth in the 2014–15 Premier League qualified Liverpool directly to the group stage of the 2015–16 Europa League, where they faced Sion, Bordeaux and for the first time, Russian side Rubin Kazan. During the group stage, manager Brendan Rodgers was replaced by Jürgen Klopp. After winning the group, Liverpool qualified for the knockout phase, beating FC Augsburg in the round of 32 before facing bitter rivals Manchester United in the round of 16, the two clubs' first meeting in Europe. Liverpool defeated them 3–1 on aggregate and victory led to a quarter-final tie with Klopp's former team Borussia Dortmund. After a 1–1 draw in the first leg at Signal Iduna Park, Dortmund went 3–1 up in the return leg at Anfield with 33 minutes remaining, requiring Liverpool to score three goals due to the away goals rule. Philippe Coutinho, Mamadou Sakho and Dejan Lovren (with a last minute winner) provided the necessary goals, as Liverpool completed the comeback and qualified for their first European semi-final since 2010. There they faced Villarreal, completing a second comeback after overturning a 1–0 defeat in the first leg at El Madrigal to qualify for the final with a 3–1 aggregate win. Liverpool played Sevilla in the final at St. Jakob-Park, Basel, on 18 May, losing 3–1. A 4th-place finish in the 2016–17 Premier League qualified Liverpool for the 2017–18 UEFA Champions League and saw them return to Europe's premier club tournament for only the second time in 8 years during the 2010s.

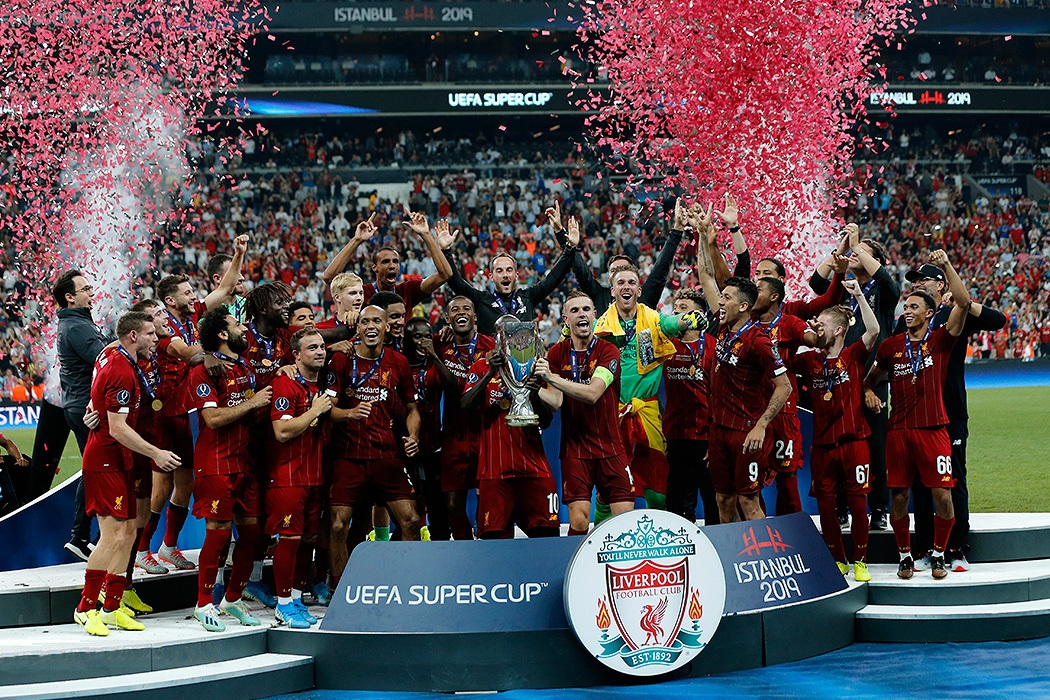
Liverpool winger Sadio Mané lifting the 2019 UEFA Super Cup after scoring twice against Chelsea in the final.

Liverpool 7–0 win away to Maribor in the third round of matches of the group stage of the 2017–18 UEFA Champions League was the club's record away win in European competitions and also the biggest away win by an English team in the competition's history. They also defeated Spartak Moscow at home by the same scoreline on the last matchday to qualify top of their group, proceeding to defeat Porto 5–0 at the Estadio de Dragao in the round of 16, before holding them to a 0–0 draw on the return leg. Liverpool then defeated domestic rivals Manchester City 3–0 and 2–1, and in the semi-finals, defeated AS Roma 5–2 at Anfield, before a 4–2 away loss led to a 7–6 aggregate win, taking them to the final, against holders Real Madrid. Liverpool lost the final 3–1 but finished 4th in the 2017–18 Premier League to qualify for the next year's edition. Liverpool reached the Champions League final for the second consecutive year in 2018–19 after overcoming a 3–0 deficit in the first leg of their semi-final against Barcelona to win 4–0 in the second leg at Anfield, with the match being considered one of the greatest Champions League comebacks of all time. Liverpool beating fellow English side Tottenham Hotspur, 2–0 in the final, securing the club's sixth European title and first European trophy since 2005. Victory qualified Liverpool for the 2019 UEFA Super Cup, which they won for the fourth time after extra time on penalties against Chelsea.

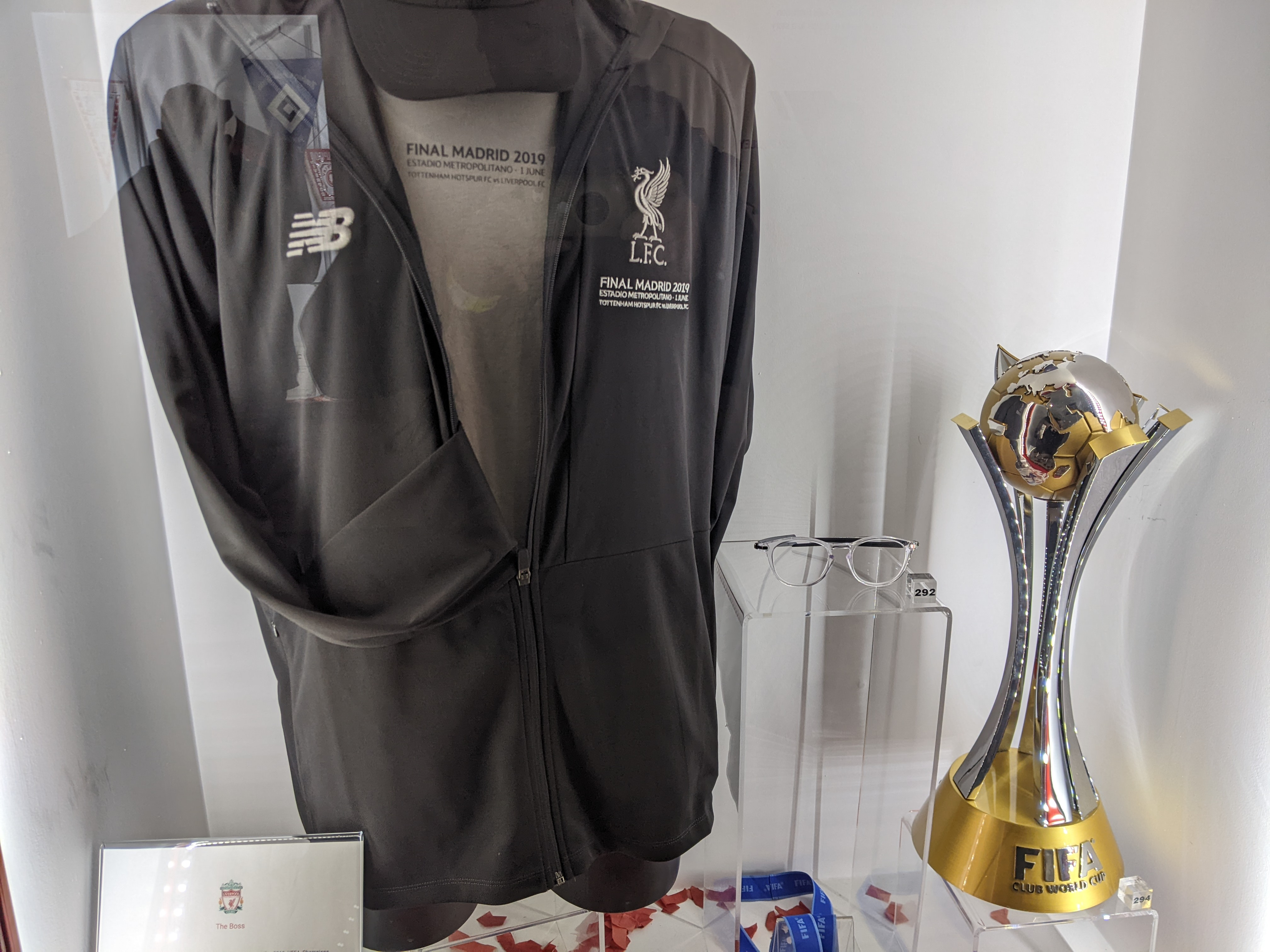
The FIFA Club World Cup trophy next to Klopp's tracksuit top (from the 2019 UEFA Champions League final) in the Liverpool F.C. museum

In December 2019, Liverpool won the FIFA Club World Cup for the first time. After defeating Mexican club Monterrey 2–1 in the semi-final, Liverpool defeated Brazilian club Flamengo 1–0 in the final, with Roberto Firmino scoring the winning goal in both games.

The following season, Liverpool were eliminated in the round of 16 by Atlético Madrid after a 4–2 defeat across two legs after extra time. Liverpool qualified for the 2020–21 edition group stage by winning the Premier League. The club reached the quarter-finals where they were eliminated 3–1 on aggregate by Real Madrid. Liverpool finished third in the 2020–21 Premier League, meaning the team qualified for the premier European competition for the fifth consecutive year. Mohamed Salah became the club's record goalscorer in Europe after he scored twice in a 3–2 away win versus Atlético Madrid on 19 October 2021. He surpassed the previous record of 30 goals by Steven Gerrard. Liverpool's 2–1 victory against AC Milan at the San Siro in their final group game meant they became the first English club to win all six Champions League group games in the competition's history. The club reached a 10th European Cup final after a 5–2 aggregate win over Villarreal in the semi-finals. Liverpool lost the final 1–0 to Real Madrid, which was overshadowed by the club's fans experiencing difficulties entering the stadium in Paris.

The club qualified for the 2022–23 UEFA Champions League after finishing second in the league. A 4–1 defeat by Napoli in their opening match of the group stage was followed by five wins, to ensure they finished as runners-up in their group. Liverpool were drawn against defending champions Real Madrid in the round of 16, in a rematch of the 2022 final. Despite taking an early two-goal lead in the first leg at Anfield, after goals from Salah and new signing Darwin Núñez, they lost 5–2. A 1–0 defeat in the reverse fixture saw Liverpool lose 6–2 on aggregate and was the third time in successions they had been knocked out of the competition by Real Madrid.

A 5th place in the Premier League meant Liverpool would be competing in the Europa League the following season for the first time since the 2015-16 season. They reached the quarter-finals where they were eliminated 3–1 on aggregate by Atalanta. A third place finish in the Premier League qualified Liverpool for the Champions League in 2024–25. At the end of the season, Klopp resigned as manager and was replaced by Arne Slot. Liverpool finished top of the new league phase, winning seven out of eight matches and were drawn against Paris Saint-Germain in the round of 16. A Harvey Elliott goal in the last minute gave Liverpool a 1–0 victory in the first leg. However, they lost the tie 4–1 in a penalty shootout in the second leg at Anfield.

== Records ==
As of 6 November 2026

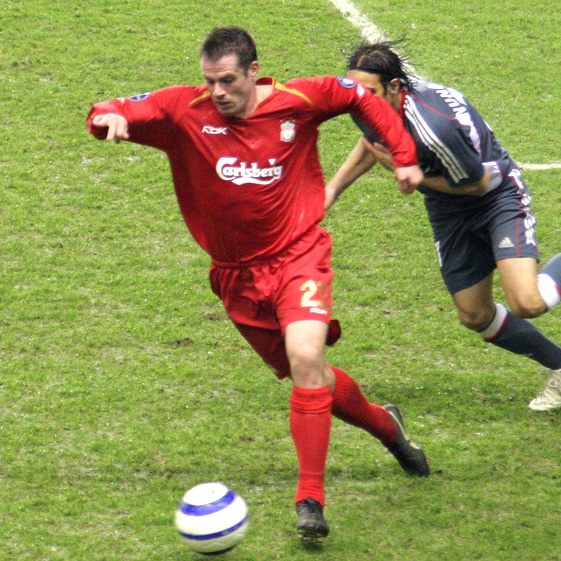
Jamie Carragher's 150 European appearances (including the pictured 2006 clash with Benfica) is a club record.

- Most appearances in European competition: Jamie Carragher, 150
- Most goals in European competition: Mohamed Salah, 53
- Most continental goals in a season: Mohamed Salah and Roberto Firmino, 11 (during the 2017–18 season)
- Youngest player to play in international competition: Rio Ngumoha, 17 years and 19 days (against Atlético Madrid, 17 September 2025)
- First European match: Liverpool 6–0 KR Reykjavík, European Cup, first round, 17 August 1964
- First goal scored in Europe: Gordon Wallace, v KR Reykjavik
- Youngest goalscorer in international competition: Michael Owen, 17 years and 276 days (against Celtic, 16 September 1997)
- Biggest win: Liverpool 11–0 Strømsgodset, in the UEFA Cup Winners' Cup, 17 September 1974
- Biggest defeat: Liverpool 1–5 Ajax, in the European Cup, 7 December 1966
- Highest European home attendance: 59,816 v Bologna, UEFA Champions League league phase, 2 October 2024
- Lowest European home attendance: 12,021 v Dundalk, in the 1982–83 European Cup
- Longest run without conceding a goal in European competition: 599 minutes (during the 2024–25 season)
- Most games in international competition as Liverpool manager: 91, Jürgen Klopp

=== By season ===
Key

- Pld = Matches played
- W = Matches won
- D = Matches drawn
- L = Matches lost
- GF = Goals for
- GA = Goals against
- GD = Goal difference
- Grp = Group stage
- Lge = League phase
- R1 = First round
- R2 = Second round
- R3 = Third round
- R4 = Fourth round
- R16 = Round of 16
- R32 = Round of 32
- QF = Quarter-final
- SF = Semi-final

Key to colours:

Gold	Winners
Silver	Runners-up

Liverpool F.C. record in international football by season
Season	Competition	Pld	W	D	L	GF	GA	Round
1964–65	European Cup	9	5	3	1	18	5	SF
1965–66	European Cup Winners' Cup	9	5	1	3	12	6	Runners-up
1966–67	European Cup	4	1	1	2	6	8	R2
1967–68	Inter-Cities Fairs Cup	6	3	0	3	13	5	R3
1968–69	Inter-Cities Fairs Cup	2	1	0	1	3	3	R1
1969–70	Inter-Cities Fairs Cup	4	3	0	1	17	3	R2
1970–71	Inter-Cities Fairs Cup	10	5	4	1	13	4	SF
1971–72	European Cup Winners' Cup	4	1	1	2	4	5	R2
1972–73	UEFA Cup	12	8	2	2	17	6	Winners
1973–74	European Cup	4	1	1	2	5	5	R2
1974–75	European Cup Winners' Cup	4	2	2	0	12	1	R2
1975–76	UEFA Cup	12	8	3	1	25	8	Winners
1976–77	European Cup	9	7	0	2	22	5	Winners
1977	European Super Cup	2	1	1	0	7	1	Winners
1977–78	European Cup	7	5	0	2	17	7	Winners
1978	European Super Cup	2	1	0	1	3	4	Runners-up
1978–79	European Cup	2	0	1	1	0	2	R1
1979–80	European Cup	2	1	0	1	2	4	R1
1980–81	European Cup	9	6	3	0	24	4	Winners
1981	Intercontinental Cup	1	0	0	1	0	3	Runners-up
1981–82	European Cup	6	4	1	1	14	6	QF
1982–83	European Cup	6	4	0	2	13	6	QF
1983–84	European Cup	9	7	2	0	16	3	Winners
1984	European Super Cup	1	0	0	1	0	2	Runners-up
1984	Intercontinental Cup	1	0	0	1	0	1	Runners-up
1984–85	European Cup	9	6	1	2	18	5	Runners-up
1991–92	UEFA Cup	8	4	0	4	16	8	QF
1992–93	UEFA Cup Winners' Cup	4	2	0	2	10	8	R2
1995–96	UEFA Cup	4	1	2	1	2	2	R2
1996–97	UEFA Cup Winners' Cup	8	6	1	1	18	9	SF
1997–98	UEFA Cup	4	1	2	1	4	5	R2
1998–99	UEFA Cup	6	2	2	2	11	5	R3
2000–01	UEFA Cup	13	8	4	1	19	9	Winners
2001	UEFA Super Cup	1	1	0	0	3	2	Winners
2001–02	UEFA Champions League	14	5	7	2	14	11	QF
2002–03	UEFA Champions League	6	2	2	2	12	8	Grp
2002–03	UEFA Cup	6	4	1	1	6	3	QF
2003–04	UEFA Cup	8	4	3	1	14	7	R4
2004–05	UEFA Champions League	15	8	4	3	20	10	Winners
2005	UEFA Super Cup	1	1	0	0	3	1	Winners
2005	FIFA Club World Cup	2	1	0	1	3	1	Runners-up
2005–06	UEFA Champions League	14	8	3	3	20	7	R16
2006–07	UEFA Champions League	15	9	2	4	23	12	Runners-up
2007–08	UEFA Champions League	14	8	4	2	34	12	SF
2008–09	UEFA Champions League	12	6	5	1	22	12	QF
2009–10	UEFA Champions League	6	2	1	3	5	7	Grp
2009–10	UEFA Europa League	8	5	0	3	14	8	SF
2010–11	UEFA Europa League	14	7	6	1	16	5	R16
2012–13	UEFA Europa League	12	7	2	3	20	13	R32
2014–15	UEFA Champions League	6	1	2	3	5	9	Grp
2014–15	UEFA Europa League	2	1	0	1	1	1	R32
2015–16	UEFA Europa League	15	6	7	2	19	13	Runners-up
2017–18	UEFA Champions League	15	9	4	2	47	19	Runners-up
2018–19	UEFA Champions League	13	8	1	4	24	12	Winners
2019	UEFA Super Cup	1	0	1	0	2	2	Winners
2019	FIFA Club World Cup	2	2	0	0	3	1	Winners
2019–20	UEFA Champions League	8	5	1	2	15	12	R16
2020–21	UEFA Champions League	10	6	2	2	15	6	QF
2021–22	UEFA Champions League	13	10	1	2	30	14	Runners-up
2022–23	UEFA Champions League	8	5	0	3	19	12	R16
2023–24	UEFA Europa League	10	7	0	3	29	12	QF
2024–25	UEFA Champions League	10	8	0	2	18	6	R16
2025–26	UEFA Champions League	12	7	0	5	24	13	QF
2026–27	UEFA Champions League	4	3	0	1	14	10	Lge

=== By competition ===
Liverpool F.C. record in international football by competition
Competition	Pld	W	D	L	GF	GA	Win%
European Cup/UEFA Champions League	274	160	50	64	528	257	58.39
UEFA Cup Winners' Cup	29	16	5	8	57	29	55.17
UEFA Cup/UEFA Europa League	134	73	34	27	215	106	54.48
Inter-Cities Fairs Cup	22	12	4	6	46	15	54.55
UEFA Super Cup	8	4	2	2	18	12	50.00
Intercontinental Cup	2	0	0	2	0	4	0.00
FIFA Club World Cup	4	3	0	1	6	2	75.00
Total	473	268	95	110	870	425	56.66

=== By country ===
Liverpool F.C. record in international football by country
Country (Note: The table excludes former nations such as East Germany and the Soviet Union.)	Pld	W	D	L	GF	GA	GD	Win%
Argentina	1	0	0	1	0	1	−1	0.00
Austria	11	9	1	1	32	10	+22	81.82
Azerbaijan	1	1	0	0	6	0	+6	100.00
Belarus	2	2	0	0	4	0	+4	100.00
Belgium	17	13	2	2	31	13	+18	76.47
Brazil	3	1	0	2	1	4	−3	33.33
Bulgaria	10	7	1	2	20	10	+10	70.00
Costa Rica	1	1	0	0	3	0	+3	100.00
Cyprus	2	2	0	0	8	2	+6	100.00
Czech Republic	6	5	1	0	16	4	+12	83.33
Denmark	6	3	2	1	9	2	+7	50.00
England	24	8	10	6	29	23	+6	33.33
Finland	12	9	2	1	43	7	+36	75.00
France	36	20	2	14	55	34	+21	55.56
Georgia	2	1	0	1	2	4	−2	50.00
Germany	49	27	15	7	93	39	+54	55.10
Greece	8	6	1	1	18	5	+13	75.00
Hungary	10	4	4	2	7	4	+3	40.00
Iceland	2	2	0	0	11	1	+10	100.00
Israel	2	1	1	0	3	2	+1	50.00
Italy	44	20	8	16	58	52	+6	45.45
Lithuania	2	2	0	0	5	1	+4	100.00
Luxembourg	2	1	1	0	3	1	+2	50.00
Macedonia	2	2	0	0	4	0	+4	100.00
Mexico	1	1	0	0	2	1	+1	100.00
Netherlands	20	12	5	3	32	20	+12	60.00
Northern Ireland	2	2	0	0	7	0	+7	100.00
Norway	4	3	1	0	16	1	+15	75.00
Poland	6	5	0	1	13	5	+8	83.33
Portugal	28	15	7	6	53	25	+28	53.57
Republic of Ireland	4	4	0	0	19	1	+18	100.00
Romania	15	10	4	1	24	9	+15	66.67
Russia	13	7	2	4	27	14	+13	53.85
Scotland	16	9	4	3	27	10	+17	56.25
Serbia	4	1	0	3	6	6	+0	25.00
Slovakia	2	2	0	0	8	0	+8	100.00
Slovenia	4	3	1	0	14	1	+13	75.00
Spain	59	26	13	20	82	71	+11	44.07
Sweden	2	2	0	0	4	1	+3	100.00
Switzerland	13	6	5	2	29	18	+11	46.15
Turkey	16	7	2	7	28	16	+12	43.75
Ukraine	2	2	0	0	3	1	+2	100.00
Wales	2	2	0	0	6	0	+6	100.00

== Honours ==
Liverpool F.C. honours in international competitions
Honour	No.	Years
European Cup/UEFA Champions League	6	1977, 1978, 1981, 1984, 2005, 2019
UEFA Cup/UEFA Europa League	3	1973, 1976, 2001
European Super Cup/UEFA Super Cup	4	1977, 2001, 2005, 2019
FIFA Club World Cup	1	2019

== Bibliography ==
- Graham, Matthew (1985). Liverpool. Twickenham: Hamlyn Publishing Group Ltd. ISBN 978-0-600-50254-8.
- Hale, Steve; Ponting, Ivan (1992). Liverpool in Europe. Enfield: Guinness. ISBN 978-0-85112-569-5.
- Kelly, Stephen F. (1988). The Official Illustrated History of Liverpool FC: You'll Never Walk Alone. London: Queen Anne Press. ISBN 978-0-356-19594-0.
- Liversedge, Stan (1991). Liverpool: The Official Centenary History. London: Hamlyn Publishing Group Ltd. ISBN 978-0-600-57308-1.
- Moore, Glenn (2000). The Concise Encyclopedia of World Football. London: Parragon. ISBN 978-0-7525-4466-3.
- Wilson, Jonathan; Murray, Scott (2013). The Anatomy of Liverpool: A History in Ten Matches. London: Orion. ISBN 978-1-4091-2692-8.
