= 2001 UEFA Super Cup =

- Match programme cover
- Event: UEFA Super Cup
| Bayern Munich | Liverpool |
| (Germany) | (England) |
| 2 | 3 |
- Date: 24 August 2001
- Venue: Stade Louis II, Monaco
- Man of the Match: Michael Owen (Liverpool)
- Referee: Vítor Melo Pereira (Portugal)
- Attendance: 13,824

The 2001 UEFA Super Cup was a football match between German team Bayern Munich and English team Liverpool on 24 August 2001 at Stade Louis II, the annual UEFA Super Cup contested between the winners of the UEFA Champions League and UEFA Cup. Bayern were appearing in the Super Cup for the third time, their two previous appearances in 1975 and 1976 had ended in defeat. Liverpool were appearing in their fourth Super Cup, they won the competition in 1977, and lost twice in 1978 and 1984.

The teams had qualified for the competition by winning the two seasonal European competitions. Both Bayern and Liverpool beat Spanish teams in the finals of the competitions. Bayern won the 2000–01 UEFA Champions League, defeating Valencia 5–4 in a penalty shoot-out after the match had finished 1–1. Liverpool won the 2000–01 UEFA Cup, beating Alavés 5–4.

Watched by a crowd of 13,824, Liverpool took the lead in the first half when John Arne Riise scored. Liverpool extended their lead before half-time when Emile Heskey scored. Liverpool scored immediately after the start of the second half to lead the match 3–0 after Michael Owen scored. Hasan Salihamidžić and Carsten Jancker scored in the second half, but Liverpool held out until the end of the match to win 3–2, their second Super Cup win.

== Match ==
=== Background ===
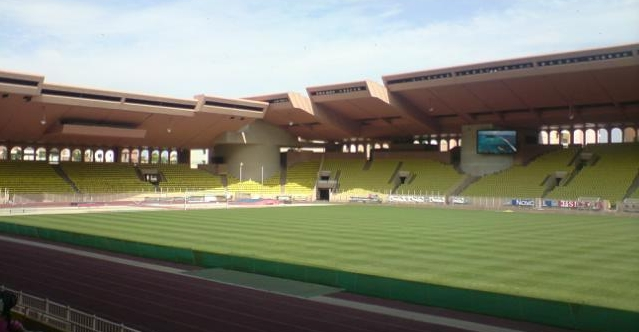
The Stade Louis II, which was the venue for the UEFA Super Cup from 1998 to 2012

Bayern Munich qualified for the Super Cup as the reigning UEFA Champions League winners. They had won the 2000–01 UEFA Champions League beating Valencia 5–4 in a penalty shoot-out after the match had finished 1–1. It would be Bayern's third appearance in the Super Cup. Their two previous appearances in 1975 and 1976 against Dynamo Kiev and Anderlecht respectively had both ended in defeat.

Liverpool had qualified for the Super Cup as a result of winning the 2000–01 UEFA Cup. They had beaten Alavés 5–4 to win their third UEFA Cup. Liverpool were appearing in their fourth Super Cup. They had previously won the competition in 1977 beating Hamburger SV. The two other appearances in 1978 and 1984 had resulted in losses to Anderlecht and Juventus respectively.

Both sides had played several matches already, Bayern had already played four matches in the 2001–02 Bundesliga and were fifth. They had won two matches, drew one and lost one. Liverpool had played two legs in the third qualifying round of the 2001–02 UEFA Champions League. They beat Finnish team FC Haka 9–1 on aggregate. As winners of the 2000–01 FA Cup, Liverpool faced Manchester United in the 2001 FA Charity Shield, which they won 2–1. Liverpool had also played one match in the 2001–02 FA Premier League; a 2–1 win over West Ham United.

Bayern and Liverpool had injury concerns ahead of the match. Four members of Bayern's Champions League winning side were missing through injury. Mehmet Scholl, Stefan Effenberg, Paulo Sérgio and Jens Jeremies were all unavailable for selection for the German side. Liverpool were without Patrik Berger after he had undergone surgery on his knee. Despite being injured for Liverpool's previous matches, Steven Gerrard was expected to feature.

=== Summary ===
Bayern kicked off, but Liverpool had the first chance of the match. Michael Owen crossed the ball into the penalty area from the right side of the pitch towards Emile Heskey, whose shot was deflected out for a corner. Bayern responded immediately, although Owen Hargreaves' shot went high over the Liverpool goal. Nine minutes after the start of the match, Liverpool were awarded a free kick after a foul by Robert Kovač on Owen. The free-kick taken by Gary McAllister was met by Markus Babbel, but he headed over the goal. With more fouls starting to occur, the first booking was awarded in the 14th minute. Liverpool midfielder Dietmar Hamann was shown a yellow card after he tackled Hasan Salihamidžić from behind. Bayern started to control the match midway through the first-half, however it was Liverpool who scored the first goal of the match. Liverpool defender John Arne Riise dispossessed Hargreaves, McAllister took control of the loose ball and passed to Steven Gerrard. Gerrard's pass to Owen meant he was in space down the right side of the pitch, Owen put a low-cross into the penalty area, which by-passed Heksey but found Riise who scored to give Liverpool the lead.

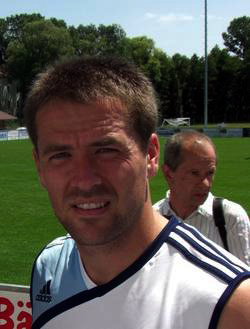
Michael Owen scored Liverpool's third goal.

Bayern were immediately on the attack following Liverpool's goal. A foul on Bayern defender Bixente Lizarazu by Gerrard resulted in a free-kick for Bayern. The subsequent free-kick taken by Ciriaco Sforza was headed over the Liverpool goal by Pablo Thiam. Liverpool regrouped and their next attack almost resulted in another goal. Heskey's pass to Owen put him clear of the Bayern defence and one-on-one with Oliver Kahn. Owen attempted to chip the ball over Kahn, however the Bayern goalkeeper was able to save the shot. Immediately afterwards Bayern were on the attack. Bayern defender Willy Sagnol held off Riise and the crossed the ball into the penalty area, the cross was met by Giovane Élber whose header went wide of the Liverpool goal. With the first half coming to an end, Liverpool had another attack. Hamann passed the ball to Heskey on the edge of the Bayern penalty area, Heskey subsequently moved past Bayern defender's Thomas Linke and Kovač, and shot low beyond Kahn to give Liverpool a 2–0 lead.

Liverpool kicked off the second half, and within 13 seconds they had scored to lead the match 3–0. Liverpool defender Jamie Carragher kicked the ball into the Bayern half, defender Thiam missed his header, which meant the ball dropped to Owen, who controlled the ball with his right foot and then put the ball into the Bayern goal with his left foot. Bayern reduced the deficit in the 57th minute when Salihamidžić scored. He headed the ball into the Liverpool goal from Bayern's first corner of the match to reduce the deficit to two goals. Midway through the half both teams made substitutions. Bayern replaced Sforza, Claudio Pizarro and Salihamidžić for Niko Kovač, Carsten Jancker and Roque Santa Cruz respectively. Liverpool substituted Gerrard and Riise for Igor Bišćan and Danny Murphy respectively. Liverpool started to pass the ball around their midfield and defence in an attempt to waste time, however in the 82nd minute Bayern scored again. Substitute Jancker headed into the Liverpool goal from a cross by Elber. Immediately afterwards Bayern had an opportunity to equalise, however Lizarazu's shot was straight at Liverpool goalkeeper Sander Westerveld. No further goals were scored and the referee blew for full-time with the final score 3–2 to Liverpool.

=== Details ===
24 August 2001
20:45 CEST

| Bayern Munich (Germany) | 2–3 | (England) Liverpool |
|---|---|---|
| Salihamidžić 57'; Jancker 82' | Report | Riise 23'; Heskey 45'; Owen 46' |

Stade Louis II, Monaco
Attendance: 13,824
Referee: Vítor Melo Pereira (Portugal)

| Bayern Munich | Liverpool |

| GK | 1 | (Germany) Oliver Kahn (c) |
| CB | 12 | (Croatia) Robert Kovač |
| CB | 6 | (Guinea) Pablo Thiam |
| CB | 25 | (Germany) Thomas Linke |
| RM | 2 | (France) Willy Sagnol |
| CM | 10 | (Switzerland) Ciriaco Sforza | (substituted off) 66' |
| CM | 23 | (England) Owen Hargreaves |
| LM | 3 | (France) Bixente Lizarazu |
| RF | 14 | (Peru) Claudio Pizarro | (substituted off) 66' |
| CF | 9 | (Brazil) Giovane Élber |
| LF | 20 | (Bosnia and Herzegovina) Hasan Salihamidžić | (substituted off) 72' |
Substitutes:
| GK | 22 | (Germany) Bernd Dreher |
| DF | 4 | (Ghana) Samuel Kuffour |
| MF | 8 | (Croatia) Niko Kovač | (substituted on) 66' |
| MF | 17 | (Germany) Thorsten Fink |
| FW | 19 | (Germany) Carsten Jancker | (substituted on) 66' |
| FW | 21 | (Germany) Alexander Zickler |
| FW | 24 | (Paraguay) Roque Santa Cruz | (substituted on) 72' |
Manager:
(Germany) Ottmar Hitzfeld

| GK | 1 | (Netherlands) Sander Westerveld |
| RB | 6 | (Germany) Markus Babbel |
| CB | 4 | (Finland) Sami Hyypiä (c) |
| CB | 2 | (Switzerland) Stéphane Henchoz |
| LB | 23 | (England) Jamie Carragher |
| RM | 21 | (Scotland) Gary McAllister |
| CM | 17 | (England) Steven Gerrard | | (substituted off) 66' |
| CM | 16 | (Germany) Dietmar Hamann | (yellow card) 14' |
| LM | 18 | (Norway) John Arne Riise | | (substituted off) 70' |
| CF | 8 | (England) Emile Heskey |
| CF | 10 | (England) Michael Owen | | (substituted off) 83' |
Substitutes:
| GK | 19 | (France) Pegguy Arphexad |
| DF | 27 | (France) Grégory Vignal |
| MF | 11 | (England) Jamie Redknapp |
| MF | 13 | (England) Danny Murphy | | (substituted on) 70' |
| MF | 25 | (Croatia) Igor Bišćan | | (substituted on) 66' |
| FW | 9 | (England) Robbie Fowler | | (substituted on) 83' |
| FW | 37 | (Finland) Jari Litmanen |
Manager:
(France) Gérard Houllier

Man of the Match:
Michael Owen (Liverpool)

Assistant referees:
Carlos Manuel Ferreira Matos (Portugal)
José Manuel Silva Cardinal (Portugal)
Fourth official:
Antonio Manuel Almeida Costa (Portugal)

Match rules

- 90 minutes
- 30 minutes of golden goal extra time if necessary.
- Penalty shoot-out if scores still level.
- Seven named substitutes.
- Maximum of three substitutions.

== Post-match ==
Liverpool's victory meant that they had won five competitions in five months, after winning the FA Cup, Football League Cup and UEFA Cup during the 2000–01 season and the FA Charity Shield at the start of the current season. Manager Gérard Houllier congratulated his players on their achievements: "I must congratulate the players for what they achieved in these six months. We know we are not perfect and we will continue to improve. But the team have shown they possess the winning edge, and this is what we have tried to develop." Man of the match Owen received a £10,000 cheque from match sponsors Carlsberg to be forwarded to a charity of his choice.

Bayern's loss in the Super Cup extended German clubs' winless streak in the competition to seven editions. Manager Ottmar Hitzfeld admitted that his team needed time to co-ordinate their defence: "It took us time to get into top gear and to organise ourselves. And when you are too slow playing a team like Liverpool, then you expect to get punished." Hitzfeld was critical of his players, stating that "individual mistakes cost us the match" and praised man of the match Michael Owen, stating that Bayern "could not counter his threat."

== See also ==
- 2001–02 UEFA Champions League
- 2001–02 UEFA Cup
- 2001–02 FC Bayern Munich season
- 2001–02 Liverpool F.C. season
- FC Bayern Munich in international football
- Liverpool F.C. in international football
