= 2005 FIFA Club World Championship final =

Association football match

- Official programme of the tournament
- Event: 2005 FIFA Club World Championship
São Paulo	Liverpool
(Brazil)	(England)
1	0
- Date: 18 December 2005
- Venue: International Stadium, Yokohama
- Referee: Benito Archundia (Mexico)
- Attendance: 66,821

The 2005 FIFA Club World Championship final was an association football match played between São Paulo of Brazil, the CONMEBOL club champions, and Liverpool of England, the UEFA club champions, on 18 December 2005 at the International Stadium Yokohama, Japan. It was the final match of the 2005 FIFA Club World Championship, a competition for the winners of the primary cup competitions of FIFA's continental members. The Club World Championship replaced the Intercontinental Cup, which both teams had competed in before. São Paulo had won the Intercontinental Cup twice in 1992 and 1993, while Liverpool had lost twice in 1981 and 1984.

The teams qualified for the championship by winning their continent's primary cup competition. São Paulo won the 2005 Copa Libertadores, defeating Brazilian team Atlético Paranaense 5–1. Liverpool won the 2004–05 UEFA Champions League, defeating Italian team Milan 3–2 in a penalty shootout after the match had finished 3–3. Both teams played one match in the championship en route to the final. São Paulo beat 2005 AFC Champions League winners Al-Ittihad 3–2, while Liverpool beat 2005 CONCACAF Champions' Cup winners Deportivo Saprissa 3–0.

Watched by a crowd of 66,821, São Paulo took the lead in the first half when Mineiro scored. Liverpool missed a number of chances to equalise in the first half. In the second half they had the majority of the possession and also had three goals disallowed. Despite all their chances they were unable to score against São Paulo who held on to win the match 1–0.

== Route to the final ==
São Paulo qualified for the FIFA Club World Championship as the reigning Copa Libertadores winners. They had won the 2005 Copa Libertadores beating Atlético Paranaense 5–1 over two-legs in the final. It would be São Paulo's first appearance in the competition, although they had won the forerunner to the competition, the Intercontinental Cup twice, in 1992 and 1993.

Liverpool had qualified for the Club World Championship as a result of winning the 2004–05 UEFA Champions League. They beat Italian team Milan 3–2 in a penalty shootout after the match had finished 3–3. Like São Paulo, Liverpool were competing in the competition for the first time, although they had appeared twice in the Intercontinental Cup, losing in 1981 and 1984.

Both teams entered the competition in the semi-finals. São Paulo's opponents were the winners of the 2005 AFC Champions League, Al-Ittihad. A 3–2 victory with two goals from Amoroso and a penalty from goalkeeper Rogério Ceni ensured São Paulo's progression to the final. Liverpool faced 2005 CONCACAF Champions' Cup winners Deportivo Saprissa. They won the match 3–0, Peter Crouch scored twice and Steven Gerrard also scored as Liverpool reached the final.

== Match ==
=== Background ===
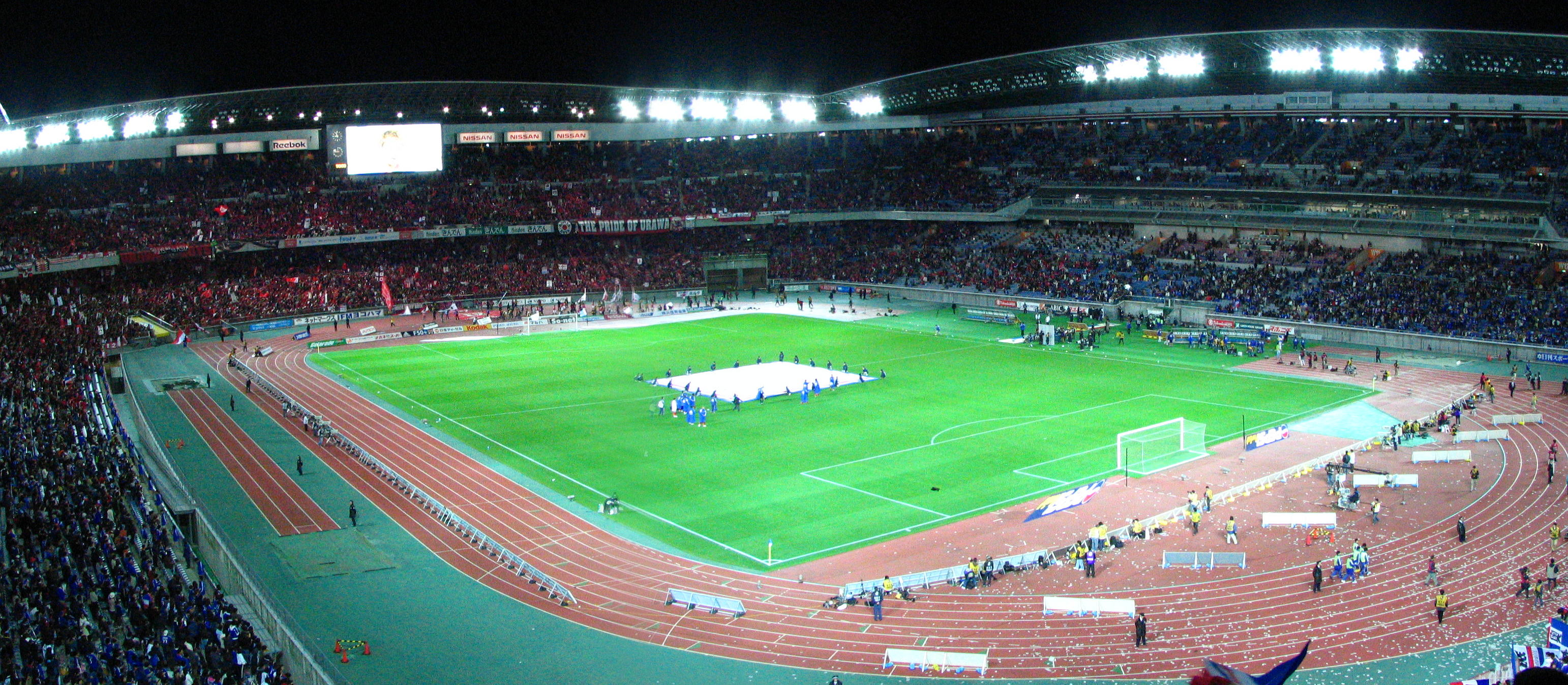
The International Stadium in Yokohama was the venue for the final

Both teams were well into their respective domestic competitions. São Paulo's domestic season had finished two weeks before the final. They finished the 2005 Campeonato Brasileiro Série A in 11th position after 42 games, they won and lost 16 games each and drew 10. Liverpool were in the middle of their domestic season, they were competing in the 2005–06 Premier League. They were second in the table and won their last match before the competition 2–0, against Middlesbrough. The victory meant Liverpool had gone 10 matches without conceding a goal, which equalled a club record.

São Paulo manager Paulo Autuori was adamant that his team would have to improve on their performance in the semi-final if they were to win the match: "We're going to have to improve certain aspects of our play if we want to win the final." Autuori was not worried about Liverpool's aerial threat, but was expecting them to keep the ball during the match: "English teams are well known for their aerial excellence, But Liverpool are a side that can keep the ball very well too as they proved when winning the Champions League."

Liverpool manager Rafael Benítez would take control of the team for the final, despite the death of his father earlier in the week. Benitez was confident that his Liverpool team would be capable of beating São Paulo: "We are playing with confidence and strength. I think we can beat anyone." Peter Crouch, who scored twice in the semi-finals, was as adamant as his manager about winning the competition. Adding that "We've not travelled all the way to Japan to go sightseeing."

=== First half ===
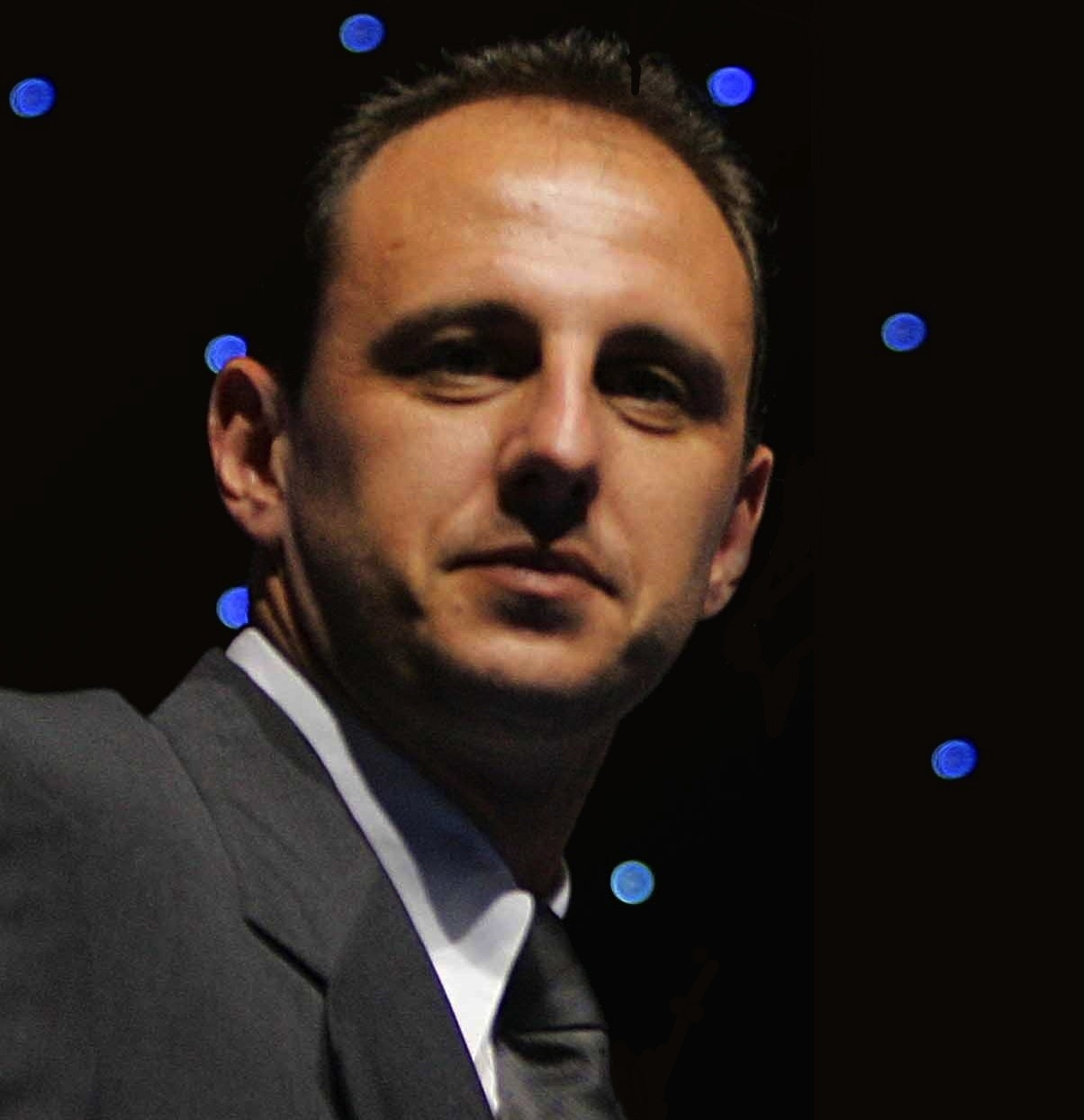
Rogério Ceni captained São Paulo in the final.

Before the start of the match, a minute's silence was held in memory of Rafa Benítez's father Francisco, who died of heart failure on the Wednesday before the final. Both teams took the pitch wearing black armbands as a mark of respect. The match was delayed further when a fan of Corinthians invaded the pitch and gave São Paulo goalkeeper Rogério Ceni a Bambi toy, referencing the Bambis nickname that city rivals associate São Paulo with. São Paulo lined up in a 3–5–2 formation, while Liverpool opted for a 4–4–1–1. Liverpool had the first chance of the match inside the opening 79 seconds, when captain Steven Gerrard's cross into the penalty area was met by Fernando Morientes, but the Spaniard headed wide. The Reds created more chances with Luis García missing twice from headers. São Paulo had only created one chance, a shot from striker Amoroso, but they began to grow in confidence. They pressed forward after Amoroso's shot and right-back Cicinho nearly scored with a lob from the halfway line which just went over the crossbar.

São Paulo's pressure resulted in them taking the lead in the 27th minute, when a chipped pass from Aloísio found Mineiro, who put the ball beyond Liverpool goalkeeper Pepe Reina to give the Brazilians a 1–0 lead. It was the first goal Liverpool had conceded in over 1,041 minutes of play. Immediately afterwards, from a corner, Xabi Alonso almost assisted García if not for the woodwork. Liverpool had another chance 30 minutes into the match, but again he failed to score with a header. Gerrard had a chance to equalise five minutes later, but he put his shot wide after Harry Kewell had passed him the ball. Liverpool continued to create chances and in the 39th minute, García saw his header into the far corner saved by Ceni. From the resulting corner, Liverpool defender Sami Hyypiä shot straight at Ceni, who also saved a header from the Finn late in the first half.

=== Second half ===
Liverpool had the first scoring opportunity of the half, six minutes into the second half. Liverpool were awarded a free kick 25 yards from the goal. Gerrard's subsequent shot was saved by Ceni. Ceni made another save soon afterwards when he tipped a cross from Kewell onto the crossbar. Liverpool did score on the hour mark, but the goal was disallowed. García's headed goal was ruled out for offside. Soon afterwards Morientes had another chance to score, but his overhead kick went over the crossbar. Liverpool had another goal disallowed soon afterwards. Alonso's corner from which Hyypiä was adjudged to have drifted out of play before the defender scored.

São Paulo made the first substitution in the 75th minute when Grafite replaced Aloísio. Liverpool made two substitutions four minutes later in an attempt to equalise. John Arne Riise and Sinama Pongolle replaced Stephen Warnock and Mohamed Sissoko. They made their final substitution in the 85th minute when Peter Crouch replaced Morientes. Liverpool had a third goal disallowed in the 89th minute; substitute Sinama Pongolle's goal was disallowed after the assistant referee had flagged García as being offside in the build-up to the goal. Liverpool had a final chance before the end of the match, but García put his shot wide. No further goals were scored and the referee blew for full-time with the final score 1–0 to São Paulo.

=== Details ===
18 December 2005
19:20 JST

São Paulo (Brazil)	1–0	(England) Liverpool
Mineiro 27'	Report

International Stadium, Yokohama
Attendance: 66,821
Referee: Benito Archundia (Mexico)

São Paulo	Liverpool

GK	1	(Brazil) Rogério Ceni (c)	(yellow card) 90'
CB	3	(Brazil) Fabão
CB	5	(Uruguay) Diego Lugano	(yellow card) 57'
CB	4	(Brazil) Edcarlos
RM	2	(Brazil) Cicinho
CM	7	(Brazil) Mineiro
CM	8	(Brazil) Josué
LM	6	(Brazil) Júnior
AM	10	(Brazil) Danilo
CF	14	(Brazil) Aloísio		(substituted off) 75'
CF	11	(Brazil) Amoroso
Substitutes:
FW	9	(Brazil) Grafite		(substituted on) 75'
Manager:
(Brazil) Paulo Autuori

GK	12	(Spain) Pepe Reina
RB	3	(Republic of Ireland) Steve Finnan
CB	23	(England) Jamie Carragher
CB	4	(Finland) Sami Hyypiä
LB	2	(England) Stephen Warnock	(substituted off) 79'
DM	14	(Spain) Xabi Alonso
DM	22	(Mali) Mohamed Sissoko	(substituted off) 79'
CM	8	(England) Steven Gerrard (c)
RF	10	(Spain) Luis García
CF	19	(Spain) Fernando Morientes	(substituted off) 85'
LF	7	(Australia) Harry Kewell
Substitutes:
DF	6	(Norway) John Arne Riise	(substituted on) 79'
FW	11	(France) Sinama Pongolle	(substituted on) 79'
FW	15	(England) Peter Crouch	(substituted on) 85'
Manager:
(Spain) Rafael Benítez

Assistant referees:
Héctor Vergara (Canada)
Arturo Velázquez (Mexico)
Fourth official:
Toru Kamikawa (Japan)

Match rules

- 90 minutes
- 30 minutes of extra time if necessary
- Penalty shoot-out if scores still level
- Twelve named substitutes, of which three may be used

=== Statistics ===
Overall
Statistic	São Paulo	Liverpool
Goals scored	1	0
Total shots	4	21
Shots on target	2	8
Ball possession	47%	53%
Corner kicks	0	17
Fouls committed	15	17
Offsides	2	7
Yellow cards	2	0
Red cards	0	0

== Post-match ==
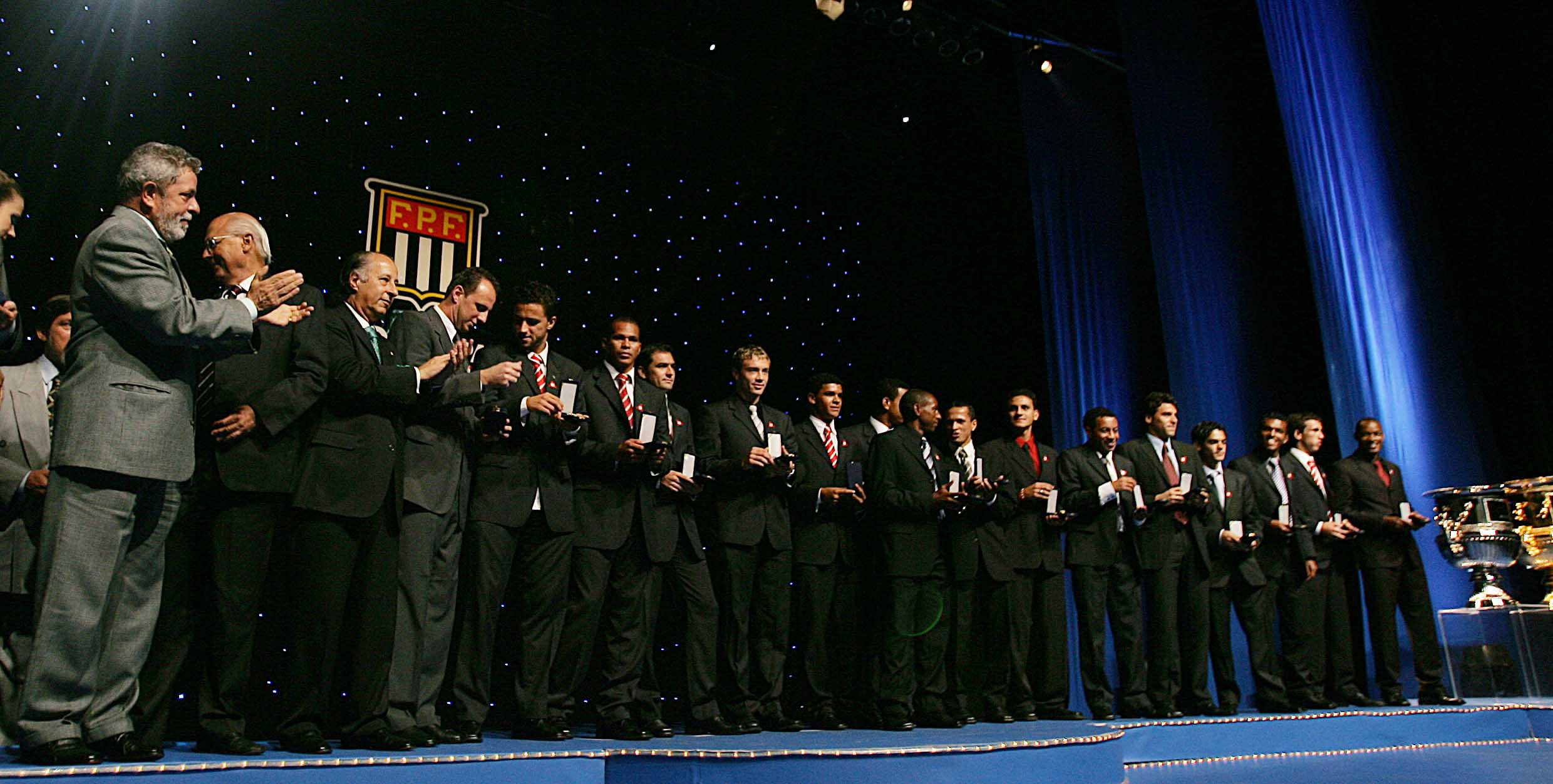
Tribute received by São Paulo from the Paulista Football Federation and President Lula (far left) for winning the Cup.

Much of the talk after the match centred on Liverpool's three disallowed goals. Rafael Benítez was incensed by the referee's decisions and remonstrated with the officials after the final whistle. Benítez was clear that at least one of those goals should not have been disallowed: "We knew that one of the goals was a goal, clear." He also questioned the competency of the officials stating: "You wouldn't get a Mexican referee and a Canadian linesman in the final of the World Cup." Luis García, who had a goal disallowed, summed up the feeling in the Liverpool dressing room: "We feel cheated."

Rogério Ceni was named as man of the match and also won the Golden Ball as the best player of the competition. Ceni was gracious in receiving the awards stating: "The awards are nice to have but the win was not just about me" Ceni dedicated the awards to those at the club saying: "When I look in these awards I see the faces of my team-mates, the coach and everyone involved at the club." São Paulo manager was delighted with his team after the victory and agreed with Ceni that the victory was a team effort: "It was a collective victory" he also said that it was "a great achievement for the club." Goalscorer Mineiro was equally overjoyed with the victory stating: "It is the happiest moment in my career."

== See also ==
- Liverpool F.C. in international football
