= 2008 Fluminense FC season =

Fluminense
2008 season
- Chairman: Roberto Horcades
- Manager: Renato Gaúcho
- Série A: 14th
- Campeonato Carioca: 3rd
- Copa Libertadores: Runners up
- Top goalscorer: League: Washington (21); All: Washington (36)
Home colours	Away colours

The 2008 Fluminense Football Club season was the 94th season in Fluminense's existence, and their 92nd in Brazil's first division. They spent 1 season in Brazil's second division in 1998 & another season in Brazil's third division in 1999.

== Squad ==
=== Transfers ===
For previous transfers, see Brazilian Football Transfers 2008

=== Statistics ===
Last updated on 2008-07-07

No.	Pos.	Name	Brasileiro Série A		Copa do Brasil		Campeonato Carioca		Copa Libertadores		Total	
No.	Pos.	Name	Apps	Goals	Apps	Goals	Apps	Goals	Apps	Goals	Apps	Goals
23	FW	(Brazil) Alan	7	1	0	0	2	3	1	0	10	4
25	DF	(Brazil) Anderson	6	0	0	0	3	0	0	0	9	0
8	MF	(Brazil) Arouca	5	0	0	0	12	0	13	0	30	0
20	DF	(Brazil) Carlinhos	6	0	0	0	2	0	1	0	9	0
17	MF	(Brazil) Cícero	3	0	0	0	16	5	13	3	32	8
7	MF	(Argentina) Conca	3	0	0	0	11	2	14	3	28	5
21	MF	(Brazil) David	6	0	0	0	10	0	1	0	17	0
12	GK	(Brazil) Diego	0	0	0	0	5	-7	0	0	5	-7
--	DF	(Brazil) Dieguinho	4	0	0	0	0	0	0	0	4	0
11	FW	(Brazil) Dodô	6	2	0	0	8	3	7	4	21	9
--	FW	(Brazil) Dori	1	0	0	0	0	0	0	0	1	0
14	MF	(Brazil) Fabinho	5	0	0	0	5	0	0	0	10	0
--	MF	(Brazil) Felipe	2	0	0	0	0	0	0	0	2	0
--	DF	(Brazil) Fernando	1	0	0	0	0	0	0	0	1	0
1	GK	(Brazil) Fernando Henrique	9	-12	0	0	12	-17	14	-14	35	-43
2	DF	(Brazil) Gabriel	2	0	0	0	14	1	14	1	30	2
--	DF	(Brazil) Gustavo Nery	0	0	0	0	7	0	0	0	7	0
6	DF	(Brazil) Júnior César	2	0	0	0	14	1	14	0	30	1
--	FW	(Brazil) Leandro Amaral	0	0	0	0	7	4	1	0	8	4
--	MF	(Brazil) Léo	1	0	0	0	0	0	0	0	1	0
--	FW	(Brazil) Léo Itaperuna	4	0	0	0	0	0	0	0	4	0
4	DF	(Brazil) Luiz Alberto	3	0	0	0	12	2	14	0	29	2
27	FW	(Brazil) Maicon	1	0	0	0	2	0	0	0	3	0
--	MF	(Brazil) Marinho	6	0	0	0	1	0	0	0	7	0
15	MF	(Brazil) Maurício	7	0	0	0	9	1	9	0	25	1
19	DF	(Brazil) Rafael	2	0	0	0	9	0	0	0	11	0
22	GK	(Brazil) Ricardo Berna	0	0	0	0	1	0	0	0	1	0
13	DF	(Brazil) Roger	5	0	0	0	9	3	8	1	22	4
16	MF	(Brazil) Romeu	6	0	0	0	4	0	1	0	11	0
--	DF	(Brazil) Sandro	4	0	0	0	0	0	0	0	4	0
18	FW	(Brazil) Somália	1	0	0	0	0	0	0	0	1	0
24	MF	(Brazil) Tartá	6	0	0	0	8	1	2	0	16	1
10	MF	(Brazil) Thiago Neves	2	0	0	0	14	8	13	7	29	15
3	DF	(Brazil) Thiago Silva	2	0	0	0	14	3	12	2	28	5
26	DF	(Brazil) Uendel	2	0	0	0	0	0	0	0	2	0
9	FW	(Brazil) Washington	2	1	0	0	16	9	12	6	30	16
5	MF	(Brazil) Ygor	3	0	0	0	14	0	12	0	29	0

=== Goalscorers ===
Place	Position	Nationality	Number	Name	Campeonato Carioca	Libertadores	Série A	Total
1	FW	(Brazil)	9	Washington	9	6	21	36
2	MF	(Brazil)	10	Thiago Neves	8	7	1	16
3	FW	(Brazil)	11	Dodô	3	4	5	12
4	MF	(Brazil)	17	Cícero	5	3	0	8
=	MF	(Argentina)	7	Darío Conca	2	2	4	8
5	DF	(Brazil)	3	Thiago Silva	3	2	1	6
6	FW	(Brazil)	23	Alan	4	0	1	5
=	MF	(Brazil)	24	Tartá	1	0	4	5
7	FW	(Brazil)	7	Leandro Amaral	4	0	0	4
=	DF	(Brazil)	13	Roger	3	1	0	4
8	MF	(Brazil)	16	Romeu	0	0	3	3
9	DF	(Brazil)	2	Gabriel	1	1	0	2
=	DF	(Brazil)	6	Júnior César	1	0	1	2
=	DF	(Brazil)	4	Luiz Alberto	2	0	0	2
=	MF	(Brazil)	15	Maurício	1	0	1	2
=	FW	(Brazil)	18	Somália	0	0	2	2
10	MF	(Brazil)	8	Arouca	0	0	1	1
=	DF	(Brazil)	20	Carlinhos	0	0	1	1
=	DF	(Brazil)	3	Edcarlos	0	0	1	1
=	DF	(Brazil)	19	Rafael	0	0	1	1
				Own goals	1	1	1	3
				Total	47	27	49	123

== Competitions ==
=== Taça Guanabara ===
==== Matches ====
19 January 2008 1	Fluminense	2–0	Cardoso Moreira	Rio de Janeiro
18:10 (UTC-3)	Thiago Neves 68'; Cícero 81'	Report		Stadium: Maracanã; Attendance: 24.811; Referee: Rodrigo Nunes de Sá

23 January 2008 2	Fluminense	3–2	Duque de Caxias	Rio de Janeiro
19:30 (UTC-3)	Thiago Silva 48'; Leandro Amaral 54'; Washington 72'	Report	Edivaldo 7'; Viola 25'	Stadium: Maracanã; Attendance: 15.102; Referee: Leandro Laranja

26 January 2008 3	Fluminense	2–2	Macaé	Rio de Janeiro
20:30 (UTC-3)	Thiago Neves 21'; Cícero 62'	Report	Steve 26'; Jones 41'	Stadium: Maracanã; Attendance: 13.643; Referee: Ubiraci Damásio

29 January 2008 4	Fluminense	5–1	Volta Redonda	Rio de Janeiro
19:30 (UTC-3)	Washington 8', 21'; Leandro Amaral 11'; Luiz Alberto 28'; Dodô 81'	Report	Hamilton 31'	Stadium: Maracanã; Attendance: 8.126; Referee: Antônio Frederico de Carvalho Schneider

1 February 2008 5	Fluminense	1–1	Boavista	Rio de Janeiro
19:30 (UTC-3)	Washington 38'	Report	Anselmo 31'	Stadium: Maracanã; Attendance: 11.720; Referee: Luis Antonio Silva dos Santos

6 February 2008 6	Fluminense	6–1	América	Rio de Janeiro
21:45 (UTC-3)	Leandro Amaral 16', 43'; Roger 18'; Washington 26', 70'; Dodô 55'	Report	Bruno Carvalho 86'	Stadium: Maracanã; Attendance: n/a Referee: Wagner Magalhães

10 February 2008 7	Flamengo	1–4	Fluminense	Rio de Janeiro
18:10 (UTC-3)	Kléberson 5'	Report	Thiago Neves 7', 28', 79'; Maurício 87'	Stadium: Maracanã; Attendance: 39.056; Referee: José Batista de Arruda

==== Semi-Final ====
16 February 2008	Botafogo	2–0	Fluminense	Rio de Janeiro
18:10 (UTC-3)	Wellington Paulista 29'; Lúcio Flávio 90+1'	Report		Stadium: Maracanã; Attendance: 51.657; Referee: Luis Antonio Silva Santos

==== League table ====
Final Standing
Team		Pts	G	W	D	L	GF	GA	GD
1	Flamengo	18	7	6	0	1	19	7	12
2	Fluminense	17	7	5	2	0	23	8	15
3	Macaé	11	7	3	2	2	9	5	4
4	Boavista	11	7	3	2	2	11	10	1
5	Volta Redonda	7	7	2	1	4	13	14	-1
6	Duque de Caxias	7	7	2	1	4	12	16	-4
7	Cardoso Moreira	7	7	2	1	4	9	19	-10
8	América	1	7	0	1	6	8	25	-17
Pts – points earned; G – games played; W - wins; D - draws; L - losses; GF – goals for; GA – goals against; GD – goal differential

Teams qualified to the semifinals

=== Taça Rio ===
==== Matches ====
1 March 2008 1	Fluminense	3–1	Cabofriense	Rio de Janeiro
18:10 (UTC-3)	Conca 11'; Washington 36'; Dodô 62'	Report	Leandro Amaro 86'	Stadium: Maracanã; Attendance: 10.433; Referee: William de Souza Nery

8 March 2008 2	Fluminense	5–2	Friburguense	Rio de Janeiro
18:10 (UTC-3)	Thiago Neves 45+1'; Gabriel 75'; Washington 79'; Thiago Silva 84'; Conca 90+1'	Report	Léo Andrade 10'; Éverton 46'	Stadium: Maracanã; Attendance: 14.792; Referee: José Alexandre Barbosa Lima

12 March 2008 3	Fluminense	2–2	Resende	Rio de Janeiro
21:45 (UTC-3)	Luiz Alberto 4'; Cícero 62'	Report	Alexandro 6', 69'	Stadium: Maracanã; Attendance: 10.605; Referee: Eduardo José Rodrigues

15 March 2008 4	Fluminense	2–0	Americano	Rio de Janeiro
18:10 (UTC-3)	Thiago Neves 5'; Cícero 57'	Report		Stadium: Maracanã; Attendance: 5.570; Referee: Robson Soares Mangefesti

23 March 2008 5	Fluminense	2–1	Vasco da Gama	Rio de Janeiro
18:10 (UTC-3)	Thiago Neves 23'; Washington 69'	Report	Edmundo 90+3'	Stadium: Maracanã; Attendance: 36.881; Referee: Djalma José Beltrami

26 March 2008 6	Fluminense	4–1	Mesquita	Rio de Janeiro
19:30 (UTC-3)	Vinícius o.g 18'; Júnior César 23'; Cícero 31'; Tartá 84'	Report	Leandro Netto 46'	Stadium: Maracanã; Attendance: n/a Referee: Agnaldo Xavier Farias

30 March 2008 7	Botafogo	3–1	Fluminense	Rio de Janeiro
18:10 (UTC-3)	Wellington Paulista 47'; Lúcio Flávio 64'; Jorge Henrique 90+1'	Report	Alan 69'	Stadium: Maracanã; Attendance: 14.649; Referee: William de Souza Nery

6 April 2008 8	Fluminense	4–0	Madureira	Mesquita
16:00 (UTC-3)	Roger 19', 70'; Alan 44', 62'	Report		Stadium: Édson Passos; Attendance: 1.324; Referee: Felipe Gomes da Silva

==== Semi-Final ====
12 April 2008	Fluminense	1–1 (5–4 p)	Vasco da Gama	Rio de Janeiro
18:30 (UTC-3)	Thiago Silva 62'	Report	Jean 58'	Stadium: Maracanã; Attendance: 49.802; Referee: Gutemberg de Paula Fonseca

==== Final ====
20 April 2008	Botafogo	1–0	Fluminense	Rio de Janeiro
16:00 (UTC-3)	Renato Silva 84'	Report		Stadium: Maracanã; Attendance: 64.785; Referee: William de Souza Nery

==== League table ====
Final Standing
Team		Pts	G	W	D	L	GF	GA	GD
1	Fluminense	19	8	6	1	1	23	10	13
2	Flamengo	17	8	5	2	1	19	9	10
3	Boavista	11	8	3	2	3	15	16	-1
4	Volta Redonda	10	8	3	1	4	12	16	-4
5	Macaé	10	8	3	1	4	11	16	-5
6	Duque de Caxias	9	8	3	0	5	9	15	-6
7	América	9	8	2	3	3	9	9	0
8	Cardoso Moreira	2	8	0	2	6	6	14	-8
Pts – points earned; G – games played; W - wins; D - draws; L - losses; GF – goals for; GA – goals against; GD – goal differential

Teams qualified to the semifinals

=== Copa Libertadores ===
==== Group stage ====
20 February 2008 1	LDU Quito (Ecuador)	0–0	(Brazil) Fluminense	Quito
19:50 (UTC-5)		Report		Stadium: Estadio Casa Blanca; Attendance: 12,144; Referee: Albert Duarte (Colombia)

5 March 2008 2	Fluminense (Brazil)	6–0	(Argentina) Arsenal	Rio de Janeiro
21:50 (UTC-3)	Thiago Neves 14'; Dodô 25', 50'; Gabriel 45'; Washington 72'; Cícero 86'	Report		Stadium: Estádio do Maracanã; Attendance: 32,614; Referee: Carlos Torres (Paraguay)

19 March 2008 3	Libertad (Paraguay)	1–2	(Brazil) Fluminense	Asunción
18:30 (UTC-3)	Samudio 30'	Report	Washington 40', 50'	Stadium: Estadio Defensores del Chaco; Referee: Héctor Baldassi (Argentina)

2 April 2008 4	Fluminense (Brazil)	2–0	(Paraguay) Libertad	Rio de Janeiro
21:50 (UTC-3)	Cícero 30'; Thiago Silva 51'	Report		Stadium: Estádio do Maracanã; Attendance: 33,551; Referee: Rubén Selman (Chile)

8 April 2008 5	Arsenal (Argentina)	2–0	(Brazil) Fluminense	Sarandí
21:10 (UTC-3)	Biagini 59'; Bottaro 65'	Report		Stadium: Estadio Julio H. Grondona; Referee: Víctor Hugo Rivera (Peru)

17 April 2008 6	Fluminense (Brazil)	1–0	(Ecuador) LDU Quito	Rio de Janeiro
19:10 (UTC-3)	Cícero 30'	Report		Stadium: Estádio do Maracanã; Attendance: 19,269; Referee: Roberto Silvera (Uruguay)

==== Round of 16 ====
30 April 2008 1st leg	Atlético Nacional (Colombia)	1–2	(Brazil) Fluminense	Medellín
20:00 (UTC-5)	Arrué 53'	Report	Thiago Neves 22' (pen.); Conca 72'	Stadium: Estadio Atanasio Girardot; Referee: Martín Vázquez (Uruguay)

6 May 2008 2nd leg	Fluminense (Brazil)	1–0	(Colombia) Atlético Nacional	Rio de Janeiro
18:30 (UTC-3)	Roger 53'	Report		Stadium: Estádio do Maracanã; Attendance: 31,700; Referee: Víctor Hugo Rivera (Peru)

==== Quarter-finals ====
14 May 2008 1st leg	São Paulo (Brazil)	1–0	(Brazil) Fluminense	São Paulo
21:50 (UTC-3)	Adriano 19'	Report		Stadium: Estádio do Morumbi; Attendance: 61,593; Referee: Óscar Ruiz (COL)

21 May 2008 2nd leg	Fluminense (Brazil)	3–1	(Brazil) São Paulo	Rio de Janeiro
21:50 (UTC-3)	Washington 11', 90+1'; Dodô 71'	Report	Adriano 70'	Stadium: Estádio do Maracanã; Attendance: 68,191; Referee: Carlos Amarilla (PAR)

==== Semi-finals ====
28 May 2008 1st leg	Boca Juniors (Argentina)	2–2	(Brazil) Fluminense	Avellaneda
21:50 (UTC-3)	Riquelme 12', 65'	Report	Thiago Silva 16'; Thiago Neves 77'	Stadium: El Cilindro; Referee: Roberto Silvera (Uruguay)

June 4, 2008 2nd leg	Fluminense (Brazil)	3–1	(Argentina) Boca Juniors	Rio de Janeiro
21:50 (UTC-3)	Washington 63'; Ibarra 71' (o.g.); Dodô 90+3'	Report	Palermo 58'	Stadium: Estádio do Maracanã; Attendance: 78,856; Referee: Carlos Torres (Paraguay)

==== Finals ====
25 June 2008 1st leg	LDU Quito (Ecuador)	4–2	(Brazil) Fluminense	Quito
19:50 UTC−05:00	Bieler 2'; Guerrón 29'; Campos 34'; Urrutia 45'	Report	Conca 12'; Thiago Neves 52'	Stadium: Estadio Casa Blanca; Attendance: 55,359; Referee: Carlos Chandía (Chile)

2 July 2008 2nd leg	Fluminense (Brazil)	3–1 (a.e.t.) (1–3 p)	(Ecuador) LDU Quito	Rio de Janeiro
21:50 UTC−03:00	Thiago Neves 12', 28', 56'	Report	Bolaños 6'	Stadium: Estádio do Maracanã; Attendance: 86,027; Referee: Héctor Baldassi (Argentina)
	Penalties
	Conca (penalty missed); Thiago Neves (penalty missed); Cícero (penalty scored); Washington (penalty missed)		(penalty scored) Urrutia; (penalty missed) Campos; (penalty scored) Salas; (penalty scored) Guerrón

=== Campeonato Brasileiro Série A ===
==== Matches ====
11 May 2008 1	Atlético Mineiro	0–0	Fluminense	Belo Horizonte
18:10 (UTC-3)		Report		Stadium: Mineirão; Attendance: 10.619; Referee: Wallace Nascimento Valente

18 May 2008 2	Fluminense	0–2	Náutico	Rio de Janeiro
16:00 (UTC-3)		Report	Wellington 71'; Warley 90+4'	Stadium: Maracanã; Attendance: 8.555; Referee: Luiz Alberto Sardinha Bites

25 May 2008 3	Sport	2–1	Fluminense	Recife
16:00 (UTC-3)	Júnior Maranhão 23'; Leandro Machado 81'	Report	Dodô 88'	Stadium: Ilha do Retiro; Attendance: 16.933; Referee: Leandro Pedro Vuaden

1 June 2008 4	Fluminense	0–1	Flamengo	Rio de Janeiro
18:10 (UTC-3)		Report	Leo Moura 87'	Stadium: Maracanã; Attendance: 19.441; Referee: Pericles Bassols Pegado Cortez

8 June 2008 5	Grêmio	2–1	Fluminense	Porto Alegre
16:00 (UTC-3)	Perea 23', 54'	Report	Dodô 78'	Stadium: Olímpico; Attendance: 23.176; Referee: Evandro Rogerio Roman

12 June 2008 6	Fluminense	1–1	Santos	Rio de Janeiro
20:30 (UTC-3)	Washington 6'	Report	Tiago Luís 90+1'	Stadium: Maracanã; Attendance: 6.539; Referee: Carlos Eugenio Simon

21 June 2008 7	Coritiba	2–1	Fluminense	Curitiba
18:20 (UTC-3)	Hugo 19'; Marlos 85'	Report	Alan 79'	Stadium: Couto Pereira; Attendance: 15.323; Referee: Alicio Pena Junior

29 June 2008 8	Fluminense	0–0	Botafogo	Rio de Janeiro
18:20 (UTC-3)		Report		Stadium: Maracanã; Attendance: 9.324; Referee: Leonardo Gaciba da Silva

6 July 2008 9	Goiás	1–0	Fluminense	Goiânia
18:10 (UTC-3)	Iarley 26'	Report		Stadium: Serra Dourada; Attendance: 6.529; Referee: Célio Amorim

12 July 2008 10	Fluminense	3–0	Atlético Paranaense	Rio de Janeiro
18:20 (UTC-3)	Dodô 13'; Conca 84'; Somália 90+1'	Report		Stadium: Maracanã; Attendance: 11.466; Referee: Sálvio Spinola

9 July 2008 11	Fluminense	2–1	Vitória	Rio de Janeiro
20:30 (UTC-3)	Rafael 71'; Dodô 81'	Report	Marquinhos 57'	Stadium: Maracanã; Attendance: 13.860; Referee: Leonardo Gaciba da Silva

16 July 2008 12	Palmeiras	3–1	Fluminense	São Paulo
21:45 (UTC-3)	Kléber 32', 48'; Maicosuel 77'	Report	Washington 34'	Stadium: Palestra Itália; Referee: Leandro Pedro Vuaden

19 July 2008 13	Fluminense	1–0	Figueirense	Rio de Janeiro
18:20 (UTC-3)	Thiago Neves 85'	Report		Stadium: Maracanã; Referee: Ricardo Marques Ribeiro

23 July 2008 14	Vasco da Gama	3–3	Fluminense	Rio de Janeiro
21:45 (UTC-3)	Edmundo 18', 58'; Leandro Amaral 53'	Report	Washington 54', 79'; Tartá 81'	Stadium: Maracanã; Referee: Marcelo de Lima Henrique

26 July 2008 15	Fluminense	1–3	Cruzeiro	Rio de Janeiro
18:20 (UTC-3)	Washington 10'	Report	Guilherme 36', 79'; Fabrício 39'; Wagner 86'	Stadium: Maracanã; Referee: Wilson Luiz Seneme

30 July 2008 16	Portuguesa	3–1	Fluminense	São Paulo
20:30(UTC-3)	Jonas 27', 86'; Preto 56'		Conca 19'	Stadium: Estádio do Canindé; Attendance: 2,701; Referee: Alicio Pena Júnior

2 August 2008 17	Fluminense	1–2	Internacional	Rio de Janeiro
18:10 (UTC-3)	Somália 72'		Nilmar 5' 27'	Stadium: Estádio do Maracanã

6 August 2008 18	Fluminense	3–1	São Paulo	Rio de Janeiro
21:50 (UTC-3)	Washington 55' (pen.), 63', 83'	Report	Hugo 49'	Stadium: Estádio do Maracanã; Referee: Leonardo Gaciba

10 August 2008 19	Ipatinga	2–1	Fluminense	Ipatinga
18:10(UTC-3)	Adeílson 81'; Kempes 84'		Tartá 41'	Stadium: Ipatingão; Attendance: 3,788; Referee: Evandro Rogério Roman

17 August 2008 20	Fluminense	1–0	Atlético Mineiro	Rio de Janeiro
18:10(UTC-3)	Dodô 61'			Stadium: Maracanã; Attendance: 12,666; Referee: Luiz Flávio de Oliveira

20 August 2008 21	Náutico	1–3	Fluminense	Recife
22:00(UTC-3)	Kuki 7'		Washington 6', 60', 86'	Stadium: Estádio dos Aflitos; Referee: Antônio Hora Filho

23 August 2008 22	Fluminense	1–1	Sport	Rio de Janeiro
18:20 (UTC-3)	Washington 84' (pen.)	Report	Roger 14'	Stadium: Estádio do Maracanã; Referee: Elmo Resende Cunha

31 August 2008 23	Flamengo	2–2	Fluminense	Rio de Janeiro
18:10(UTC-3)	Marcelinho Paraíba 25'; Kléberson 88'		Conca 10'; Maurício 66'	Stadium: Maracanã; Attendance: 56,074; Referee: Leonardo Gaciba

6 September 2008 24	Fluminense	0–0	Grêmio	Rio de Janeiro
18:20(UTC-3)				Stadium: Maracanã; Attendance: 18,852; Referee: Heber Roberto Lopes

14 September 2008 25	Santos	2–1	Fluminense	Santos
18:10 UTC−03:00	Kléber Pereira 45+1'; Bida 79'	Report	90' Romeu	Stadium: Vila Belmiro; Attendance: 11,085; Referee: Carlos Eugênio Simon

20 September 2008 26	Fluminense	2–3	Coritiba	Rio de Janeiro
18:20 (UTC-3)	Washington 31', 45+1'		Carlinhos Paraíba 10'; Keirrison 57', 72'	Stadium: Maracanã; Referee: Jailson Freitas

28 September 2008 27	Botafogo	1–1	Fluminense	Rio de Janeiro
18:10 (UTC-3)	Carlos Alberto 28'		Edcarlos 90+1'	Stadium: Engenhão; Referee: Péricles Pegado Cortez

1 October 2008 28	Fluminense	1–1	Goiás	Rio de Janeiro
20:h30 (UTC-3)	Conca 36'		Vítor 18'	Stadium: Maracanã; Referee: Wilson Luiz Seneme

11 October 2008 29	Atlético Paranaense	1–3	Fluminense	Curitiba
18:20(UTC-3)	Antônio Carlos 16'		Washington 21', 24', 76'	Stadium: Kyocera Arena; Referee: Carlos Eugênio Simon

19 October 2008 30	Vitória	2–2	Fluminense	Salvador
16:00(UTC-3)	Rafael 15'; Marquinhos 65'		Thiago Silva 36'; Washington 46'	Stadium: Barradão; Attendance: 12,059; Referee: Leandro Vuaden

25 October 2008 31	Fluminense	3–0	Palmeiras	Rio de Janeiro
16:00 (UTC-3)	Carlinhos 14'; Maurício 38' (o.g.); Júnior César 42'			Stadium: Maracanã; Attendance: 31,683; Referee: Sérgio da Silva Carvalho

2 November 2008 33	Fluminense	0–1	Vasco da Gama	Rio de Janeiro
19:10 (UTC-3)			Wagner Diniz 72'	Stadium: Maracanã; Attendance: 37,388; Referee: Carlos Eugenio Simon

5 November 2008 32*	Figueirense	0–1	Fluminense	Florianópolis
20:30(UTC-3)			Arouca 12'	Stadium: Estádio Orlando Scarpelli; Referee: Wilson Luiz Seneme

9 November 2008 34	Cruzeiro	1–0	Fluminense	Belo Horizonte
17:00(UTC-3)	Ramires 65'			Stadium: Estádio do Mineirão; Attendance: 16,345; Referee: Leonardo Gaciba

15 November 2008 35	Fluminense	3–1	Portuguesa	Rio de Janeiro
18:30(UTC-3)	Washington 51'; Tartá 74'; Romeu 84'		Edno 24'	Stadium: Estádio do Maracanã; Attendance: 42,023; Referee: Antônio Hora Filho

23 November 2008 36	Internacional	0–2	Fluminense	Porto Alegre
16:00 (UTC-3)			Romeu 15'; Washington 67' (pen.)	Stadium: Estádio Beira-Rio; Attendance: 7,481; Referee: Sérgio da Silva Carvalho

30 November 2008 37	São Paulo	1–1	Fluminense	São Paulo
17:00 (UTC-3)	Borges 57'	Report	Tartá 50'	Stadium: Estádio do Morumbi; Attendance: 66,888; Referee: Heber Roberto Lopes

7 December 2008 38	Fluminense	1–1	Ipatinga	Rio de Janeiro
17:00 (UTC-3)	Washington 75'		Adeílson 60'	Stadium: Estádio do Maracanã; Attendance: 49,178; Referee: Carlos Eugenio Simon

== League table ==
Pos	Team	Pld	W	D	L	GF	GA	GD	Pts	Qualification or relegation
1	São Paulo	38	21	12	5	66	36	+30	75	Copa Libertadores 2009
2	Grêmio	38	21	9	8	59	35	+24	72	Copa Libertadores 2009
3	Cruzeiro	38	21	4	13	59	44	+15	67	Copa Libertadores 2009
4	Palmeiras	38	19	8	11	55	45	+10	65	Copa Libertadores 2009
5	Flamengo	38	18	10	10	67	48	+19	64	Copa Sudamericana 2009
6	Internacional	38	15	9	14	48	47	+1	54	Copa Sudamericana 2009
7	Botafogo	38	15	8	15	51	44	+7	53	Copa Sudamericana 2009
8	Goiás	38	14	11	13	57	47	+10	53	Copa Sudamericana 2009
9	Coritiba	38	14	11	13	55	48	+7	53	Copa Sudamericana 2009
10	Vitória	38	15	7	16	48	44	+4	52	Copa Sudamericana 2009
11	Sport	38	14	10	14	48	45	+3	52	Copa Libertadores 2009
12	Atlético Mineiro	38	12	12	14	50	61	−11	48	Copa Sudamericana 2009
13	Atlético Paranaense	38	12	9	17	45	54	−9	45	Copa Sudamericana 2009
14	Fluminense	38	11	12	15	49	48	+1	45	Copa Sudamericana 2009
15	Santos	38	11	12	15	44	53	−9	45	
16	Náutico	38	11	11	16	44	54	−10	44	
17	Figueirense	38	11	11	16	49	72	−23	44	Relegation to Série B
18	Vasco da Gama	38	11	7	20	56	72	−16	40	Relegation to Série B
19	Portuguesa	38	9	11	18	48	70	−22	38	Relegation to Série B
20	Ipatinga	38	9	8	21	37	66	−29	35	Relegation to Série B

Source: rsssfbrasil.com
Rules for classification: 1) points; 2) goal difference; 3) number of goals scored.
