= Alina Paim =

Brazilian writer (1919–2011)

- Born: Alina de Andrade Leite; 10 October 1919; Estância, Sergipe, Brazil
- Died: 1 March 2011 (aged 91)
- Education: Colégio Nossa Senhora da Soledade
- Occupations: Educator, writer
- Spouse: Isaias Paim (m. 1943)
- Writing career
- Genres: Adult fiction, children's literature
- Subjects: Social life, feminism

Alina Paim (10 October 1919 – 1 March 2011) was a Brazilian novelist, author of children's literature and teacher. She was a communist and women's rights activist who translated Lenin's works into Portuguese. A re-evaluation of her contributions to Brazilian literature has emerged since 2007, when Paim was discovered to still be living in Mato Grosso do Sul. Her works were honored by the Antonio de Almeida Prize in 1961 and the Walmap Prize in 1965, both given by the Brazilian Academy of Letters.

== Biography ==
Alina de Andrade Leite was born in Estância, Sergipe, Brazil to Manuel Vieira Leite and Maria Portela de Andrade Leite. When she was three months old, her family moved to Salvador de Bahia, Brazil. Her mother began teaching her to read and do math when she was around four years old. When Leite was six years old, her mother died and she went to live with her mother's sister, Laurinha, in Simão Dias, where she attended primary school at Escola Menino Jesus. She remained with her aunt for almost four years, but Laurinha died when Leite was about to turn ten. Leite was then sent to the boarding school, Grupo Escolar Fasuto Cardoso, where she studied anthropology, arithmetic, botany, Brazilian history, geography, geology, Portuguese language, and science.

1932, she returned to Salvador de Bahia to study at the Colégio Nossa Senhora da Soledade (College of Our Lady of Solitude), wrote her first pieces in the school paper, and graduated as a teacher. She taught until her marriage, to the medical doctor Isaias Paim on 8 January 1943 in Salvador de Bahia. Immediately after their wedding, the couple moved to Rio de Janeiro, where she could not work as a teacher because they refused to recognize her diploma.

The following year, she published her debut novel, A Estrada da Liberdade (The Road of Liberty). The story addresses a young teacher's first job and how she is paid less than the men with the same job; how her employment options are limited to maintain her "respectability" but to increase her education she reads "subversive" literature. As with many of Paim's writings, the book relays her thoughts on the status of women from various perspectives. She did not consider her writing to be feminist, but rather "social realism". Paim analyzed the problematic situations of women's lives and the consequences of social and psychological contexts within which they lived.

Beginning in 1945, and for the next 16 years, Paim began to write for a children's program for the Ministry of Education and Culture. The program, No Reino da Alegria (In the Realm of Joy), was directed by Geni Marcondes and aired on MEC radio under the direction of Fernando Souza. During this time, she was also writing novels for adults, exploring social situations. Simão Dias was published in 1949 and her third book, A sombra do patriarca (In the Shadow of the Patriarch) was published in 1950. The book, about a young woman who leaves the city and goes to a farm in the north to recuperate from malaria, explores class differences, generational differences, social identity, and how patriarchy effects the various women (and men) in the novel.

Her publication in 1955 of A Hora Próxima caused an arrest warrant to be issued for her. The book was about the workers' strike on the largest railroad in the country. The government's case against her collapsed when the public group supposed to weigh her recompense for the book's sedition, praised her for accurately telling of their experiences. The communist party had the book translated into both Chinese and Russian. O Sol do Meio-Dia (1961) won the Antonio de Almeida Prize of the Brazilian Academy of Letters (ABL) in 1961 and was translated into German and Bulgarian. Her Trilogia de Catarina (1964) won a Premio Walmap (Walmap Prize) in 1965 from the (ABL).

In 1962, she began publishing children's literature. O lenço encantado, A casa da coruja verde and Luzbela vestida de cigana were followed in 1966 by Flocos de algodão. The first three volumes share the same characters, and the illustrator, Percy Deane whose work on all three volumes further tied them together. The stories use fantasy and magic to discuss themes of transformation, change and the importance of imagination. Her last children's book was different from the others, but it was written for the Agricultural Clubs of the Ministry of Education. It disseminates information about cotton, but still reiterates the theme of imagination and intellectual curiosity. While the volumes reinforce cultural beliefs, behaviors, and values, Paim did not treat her child characters as subservient to adults, but rather as peers, which was extremely unusual for the era.

When the 1964 Brazilian coup d'état occurred, Paim escaped exile because she went into hiding. Rumors were that she was in Cruzeiro, São Paulo, but she had escaped from there three weeks before. For 23 days communist sympathizers hid her. She did not escape the persecution; because of her ties to the Partido Comunista Brasileiro (PCB) (Brazilian Communist Party) and defense of feminist causes, she was unable to publish any books until the 1979 Amnesty Law was passed. During the Brazilian military government (1964–1985) she translated texts of Vladimir Lenin and published articles in periodicals including O Momento, from Bahia; Época, from Sergipe; and Leitura, in Rio de Janeiro.

In 1979, A Correnteza was published and in 1994, she published A Sétima Vez. In 2007, a group of writers, who were preparing feminist studies on writers from Sergipe, were surprised to learn that Paim had been living for many years in Campo Grande in the state of Mato Grosso do Sul. Her rediscovery resulted in a re-evaluation of her literary contributions.

== Selected works ==
=== Fiction ===
- A Estrada da Liberdade Rio de Janeiro, Brazil. (1944) (in Portuguese)
- Simão Dias Livraria Editôra da Casa: Rio de Janeiro, Brazil. (1949) (in Portuguese)
- À Sombra do Patriarca Editôra Globo: Porto Alegre, Brazil. (1950) (in Portuguese)
- A Hora Próxima Editorial Vitória: Rio de Janeiro, Brazil. (1955) (in Portuguese)
- Čas blizok (translation of A Hora Próxima) Izd. inostrannoj lit: Moscow, Russia. (1957) (in Russian)
- 时候就要到了 (Shi hou jiu yao dao le: translation of A Hora Próxima) Ren min wen xue chu ban she: Beijing, China. (1959) (in Chinese)
- Sol do Meio-Dia Associação Brasileira do Livro: Rio de Janeiro, Brazil. (1961) (in Portuguese)
- Trilogia de Catarina ("O Sino e a Rosa", "A Chave do Mundo" and "O Círculo") Lidador: Rio de Janeiro. (1964) (in Portuguese)
- Mittagssonne (translation of Sol do Meio-Dia) Verl. Volk u. Welt: Berlin. (1968) (in German)
- A Correnteza Editora Record: Rio de Janeiro. (1979) (in Portuguese)
- A Sétima Vez Governo de Sergipe, Secretaria Especial da Cultura, Fundação Estadual de Cultura: Aracaju, Brazil. (1994) (in Portuguese)

=== Children's stories ===
- O Lenço Encantado Conquista: Rio de Janeiro. (1962) (in Portuguese)
- A Casa da Coruja Verde Conquista: Rio de Janeiro. (1962) (in Portuguese)
- Luzbela Vestida de Cigana Conquista: Rio de Janeiro. (1963) (in Portuguese)
- Flocos de Algodão Serviço de Informação Agricola: Rio de Janeiro, Brazil. (1966) (in Portuguese)
