= Thiago Silva =

Brazilian footballer (born 1984)

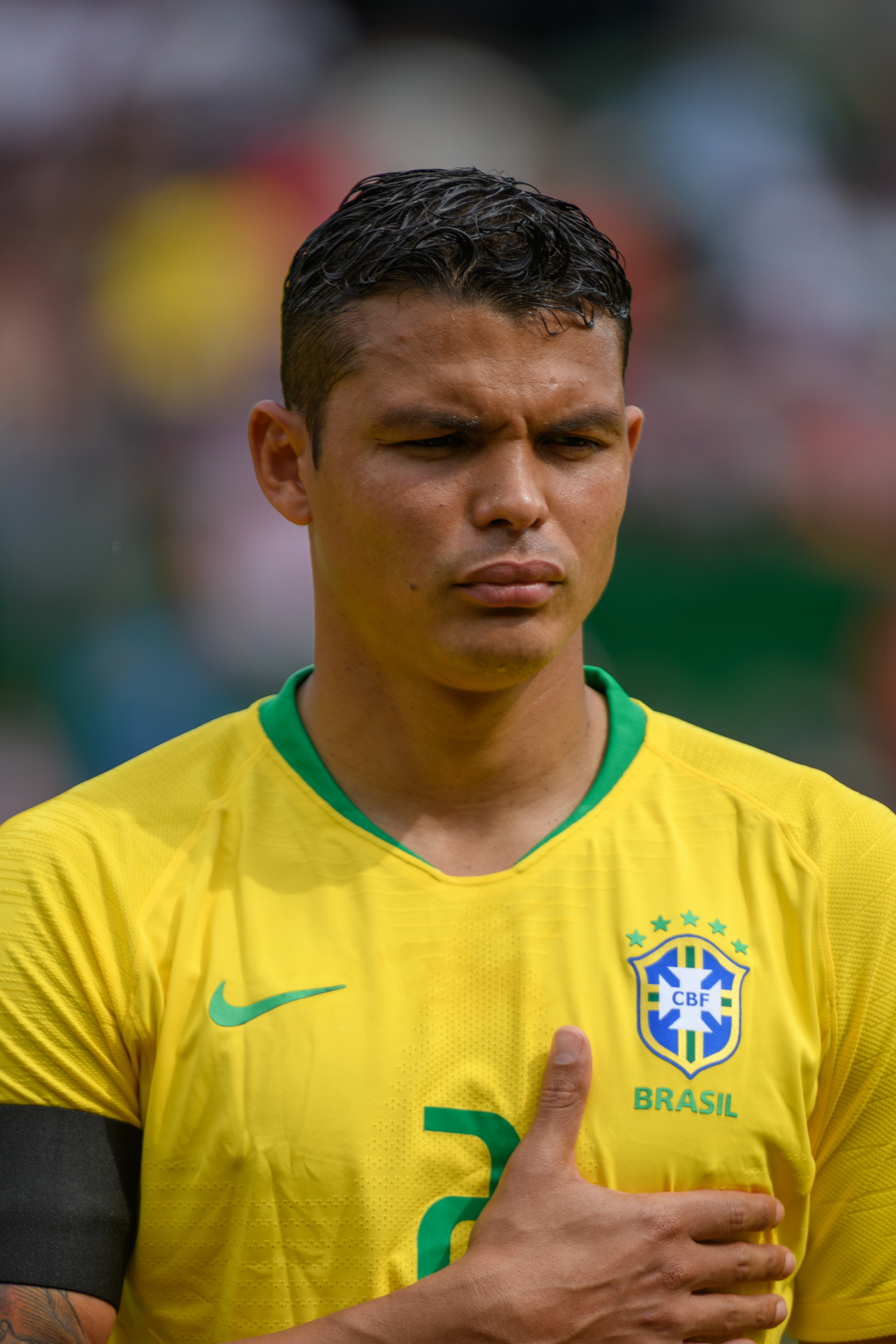
- Silva in 2018

Personal information
- Full name: Thiago Emiliano da Silva
- Date of birth: 22 September 1984 (age 42)
- Place of birth: Rio de Janeiro, Brazil
- Height: 1.81 m (5 ft 11 in)
- Position: Centre-back

Team information
- Current team: Fluminense
- Number: 3

Youth career
- 1998–2000: Fluminense
- 2000–2001: Barcelona-RJ
- 2001–2002: RS Futebol

Senior career*
Years	Team	Apps	(Gls)
2002–2003	RS Futebol	25	(2)
2004	Juventude	35	(3)
2004–2005	Porto B	14	(0)
2005–2006	Dynamo Moscow	0	(0)
2006–2008	Fluminense	108	(9)
2009–2012	Milan	93	(5)
2012–2020	Paris Saint-Germain	204	(9)
2020–2024	Chelsea	113	(8)
2024–2025	Fluminense	47	(3)
2026	Porto	8	(0)
2026–	Fluminense	8	(0)

International career
2008–2012	Brazil Olympic (O.P.)	11	(0)
2008–2022	Brazil	113	(7)
Medal record
Men's football
Representing Brazil
Copa América
Winner	2019 Brazil
Runner-up	2021 Brazil
FIFA Confederations Cup
Winner	2013 Brazil
Summer Olympics
Silver medal – second place	2012 London	Team
Bronze medal – third place	2008 Beijing	Team
- * Club domestic league appearances and goals as of 23:23, 19 November 2026 (UTC)

Thiago Emiliano da Silva (Brazilian Portuguese: [tʃiˈaɡu ˈsiwvɐ]; born 22 September 1984) is a Brazilian professional footballer who plays as a centre-back for Campeonato Brasileiro Série A club Fluminense. Widely regarded as one of the best defenders of his generation, he is one of a select number of players who have amassed over 1,000 career appearances.

Silva began his senior club career in 2002 playing as a midfielder for RS Futebol, and transitioned to a defensive position while at Juventude; he then signed with Porto in 2004, at age 19, and moved to Dynamo Moscow on loan, where he was hospitalized with a near fatal bout of tuberculosis. After recovering, he joined Fluminense and won a Copa do Brasil in 2007. In 2009, Silva moved to Italian side Milan for a reported fee of €8 million and won the 2010–11 Serie A title with the latter.

In 2012, Silva was the subject of a then-record football deal when he signed for Paris Saint-Germain in a transfer worth up to €42 million, becoming the most expensive defender ever at the time. There, he would become the club's longest serving captain, winning seven Ligue 1 titles, six Coupes de la Ligue, five Coupes de France, and playing in the final of the UEFA Champions League, which served as his last PSG appearance. He currently ranks eighth in all-time appearances for the club. In 2020, the 36-year-old Silva joined Chelsea on a free transfer, winning the Champions League in his first season, and both the UEFA Super Cup and FIFA Club World Cup in his second.

Silva made his senior international debut for Brazil in 2008 at age 23, and has since received over 110 caps, including appearances in eight major tournaments. He earned a bronze medal at the Summer Olympics in 2008 and a silver in 2012, before serving as captain for Brazil on home soil as they won the 2013 FIFA Confederations Cup and finished fourth at the 2014 FIFA World Cup. Silva was also a member of the team that won the Copa América in 2019 and finished runners-up in 2021. He has not been called up to the Brazilian national football team since December 2022, but has not officially announced his retirement.

== Club career ==
=== Early career ===
When he was younger, Silva was admitted into a school in the Campo Grande neighborhood of Rio – coincidentally a feeder school for Fluminense. At the age of 14, Silva impressed Fluminense coach Maurinho during a friendly in Xerém. He was given a short trial, where he was given the role of a defensive midfielder. Silva's playing opportunities were few, prompting him to trial for other clubs. In 1999, at the age of 15, Silva auditioned at Madureira, Olaria, and Flamengo; he was rejected at each club, the trial at Flamengo being the most difficult for him as he was not even observed by coaches.

After another unsuccessful trial at Botafogo, Silva was taken on by his hometown side Barcelona, a small Brazilian club in the lower divisions. The following year, Silva played at a showcase tournament in São Paulo in the hope of attracting the attention of bigger clubs. It is there where he was spotted by Paulo César Carpegiani, who invited him to join RS Futebol in the south of Brazil. Joining the club in the end of 2001, Silva became a professional in 2002 and competed in the third division of the Campeonato Gaúcho, finishing second and achieving promotion to the state's second division. In a tournament played in Ancona, Italy, Silva was spotted by Bruno Conti, a coach with Roma. Conti wanted him to play for Roma, but Silva did not accept the offer. Strong performances in his last season as a defensive midfielder led to Silva's move to Juventude.

Silva moved to Juventude in 2004, where he played for six months. At 20 years old, Silva transitioned from midfield to defence under the tutelage of Ivo Wortmann. In his only season at Juventude, Silva was regarded as the revelation of the season. He was rated by the sports magazine Placar as the third-best defender in Brazil and was included in the team of the season. Juventude had made a huge leap in league placement during Silva's time at the club – from finishing 18th with 53 points in 2003, to finishing 7th with 70 points in 2004. Silva had caught the eye of many clubs with his outstanding performances, and he was sold to Porto.

Silva was bought by Porto for €2.5 million in 2004, but played only for the reserve team. After a year in Portugal, he joined Dynamo Moscow, where he was diagnosed with tuberculosis and was hospitalised for six months. He is quoted as saying, "Every now and then a doctor would come in and give me an injection, three or four times a day, plus 10-15 pills." His illness became much worse over time and his doctors told him that if he had been hospitalized two weeks later, he could have died. During his recovery, Silva decided to retire from football but was persuaded to reconsider by his mother.

=== Fluminense ===
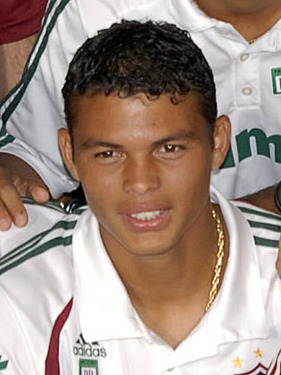
Silva with Fluminense in 2007

Silva returned to football with the help of his former coach, Ivo Wortmann. In 2006, Wortmann was signed as a coach by Fluminense and requested to bring Silva with him, despite Silva's health issues. On 14 January, Fluminense announced the signing of Silva from Dynamo Moscow. Fluminense struggled in the 2006 Brasileirão, finishing 15th out of 20 teams; however, Silva was described as one of the best players in the season. It is during this time where Silva developed the nickname of "O Monstro" — Portuguese for "The Monster".

2007 was a much better year for both Fluminense and for Silva. The club finished in fourth place in the 2007 Brasileirão, conceding only 39 goals in 38 matches, enough for the second-best defence in Brazil. More importantly, Fluminense managed a historic victory in the 2007 Copa do Brasil, winning the prestigious trophy for the first time. Silva played a decisive part in the victory; he started in every match, and scored the opening goal in the quarter-final, as well as the equalising goal in the semi-final. Silva's form through the season led him to be selected into Brazil national team manager Dunga's preliminary squad for the 2007 Copa América. After winning the Copa do Brasil, Silva was recognised by fans as the best defender in Brazil. At the end of the season, he was one of three nominees for the Best Central Defender award, alongside Breno and Fábio Luciano. The voting results were unveiled on 4 December, where Silva finished second, behind Breno.

"Silva is a phenomenon."

— Dunga, 2008

2008 was a bad year for Fluminense, but Silva's best on an individual level. Having devoted much of their efforts towards the 2008 Copa Libertadores, the club's league form suffered, finishing in 14th place. On 18 January, Silva was rewarded by Fluminense's board of directors for his 100th match in the tricolor: He was awarded a shirt with the number "100" and a plaque in honour of his achievements. Silva became an idol for young Fluminense supporters with his level of performances — the white wristband that Silva would wear during matches became a trend amongst teenagers in Rio de Janeiro who supported the tricolor. In May 2008, four fans painted a flag of Silva to honour what they deemed "the best central defender in Brazil". It was first shown in the Copa Libertadores semi-final against Boca Juniors — Silva scored a crucial equaliser in the same match.

Silva was included in the 2008 Brasileirão Team of the Season and was selected as the Fans' Player of the Season. Silva was widely regarded as one of Fluminense's most important performers in the 2008 Copa Libertadores, reaching the finals only to lose on penalties to LDU Quito. Silva's form for Fluminense earned him a call-up to the Seleção to take part in the 2008 Summer Olympics. Silva was linked with many clubs in 2008, including the likes of Inter Milan, Chelsea and Villarreal, though ultimately he opted to join the Brazilian contingent already at Milan. The transfer was confirmed on 12 December. In his final match for Fluminense, Silva was cheered by 50000 supporters who were witnessing what appeared to be his last performance at the Maracanã.

=== Milan ===
After a five-month rundown and a confusing four-hour negotiation period, Silva agreed to a move to Milan for a €10 million fee, with net wages of €2.5 million on a four-year contract. Although Silva could not play competitive matches, he was able to train with the first team. In his first month at Milan, he was taught new defending techniques from Paolo Maldini and manager Carlo Ancelotti. Silva played his first match for the Rossoneri in a friendly match against Hannover 96 on 21 January 2009; he played well, making ten tackles. His performance drew praise from Milan executive Adriano Galliani and teammate Clarence Seedorf. Silva was officially registered as a Milan player for the 2009–10 season.

==== 2009–10: Debut season ====
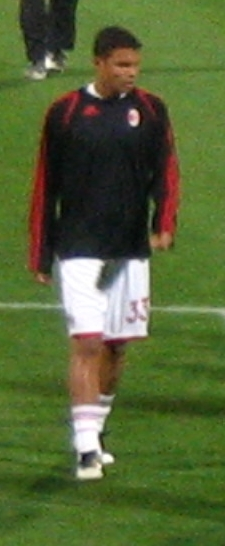
Silva warming up for Milan in May 2010

Silva played his first competitive match of the season against Siena on 22 August 2009. After the match, he was praised for a strong individual performance alongside teammate Alessandro Nesta. Milan legend Paolo Maldini claimed that Silva had the "physical and technical characteristics of a champion", while Nesta said that Silva would "extend my life as a central defender". On 23 September, Silva left training with a muscle strain; he was inactive for the next four matches. In October, Silva followed a poor performance against Roma with two great displays against Real Madrid; Silva also had a wrongly disallowed goal in Milan's away victory.

"Thiago Silva will extend my life as a central defender."

— Alessandro Nesta, 2009

On 8 November, Silva scored a goal – as well as an own-goal – in a 2–1 victory over Lazio. His quick transition to European football was met with a lot of interest from Italian media — the investment of €10 million to acquire Silva was regarded as a good decision; the La Gazzetta dello Sport, the largest daily newspaper in Italy, claimed that Silva's value had doubled at that point. On 25 November, Silva put in a man of the match performance against Marseille to secure passage into the knockout stages of the UEFA Champions League. In a match against Zürich on 8 December, Silva was substituted after 20 minutes with a muscle injury. It was suspected that Silva tore a muscle, and would miss up to two months, though after clinical examinations, the injury was found to be a strain rather than a tear. On 30 December, Silva was pronounced to be fully fit by club doctor Massimo Manara.

On 10 January 2010, Milan defeated Juventus by a score of 3–0; Silva was rated as one of the best performers on the day, and La Gazzetta dello Sport compared the understanding of Silva and Nesta to the legendary duo of Franco Baresi and Alessandro Costacurta. On 15 January, Silva's teammate Alexandre Pato claimed that Silva would become the best defender in the world. In a match against Udinese on 12 February, Silva picked up a muscle injury, leaving him in doubt for Milan's upcoming Champions League match against Manchester United. On 6 March, Silva was selected as man of the match in a 0–0 draw with fellow Scudetto challengers Roma. At the end of the season, Silva was rated as the third-best central defender in the 2009–10 Serie A by La Gazzetta dello Sport.

==== 2010–11: Serie A win ====
Silva's season began with a goal against Lecce in the first match of the 2010–11 Serie A season. In a 3–1 victory over Chievo on 16 October, Silva was forced to leave the match with a sprained left ankle. The injury forced Silva to miss a Champions League group stage match against Real Madrid — Milan CEO Adriano Galliani jokingly said after the match that he would give Silva his healthy foot in order to see him play at the Santiago Bernabéu Stadium. Silva was inactive for four matches due to his injury. After returning from his injury, he was to play in the Derby della Madonnina against city rivals and treble winners Inter Milan. Matched against UEFA Club Footballer of the Year winner Diego Milito, Silva nullified his efforts and played a key role in Milan's 1–0 victory. In a 0–2 group stage loss to Ajax in the Champions League, Silva suffered a right knee injury that required arthroscopic surgery. Initially feared to be a serious injury, it only kept Silva away for one month. At the midpoint of the season, Silva was regarded as the best defender in the Serie A, and the best in Europe.

"I think that Thiago Silva is the best defender in the world. It is incredible how good he really is. Thiago Silva is part of a new generation of phenomenal players who are perhaps born once every 100 years."

— Filippo Inzaghi, 2011

Forced to play as an emergency defensive midfielder due to an injury crisis, Silva played extraordinarily well against Cesena, a match which Milan won 2–0. Silva's performance brought comparisons to legendary Milan midfielder Marcel Desailly. In his next match, Silva was rated as the best player in Milan's 2–1 victory over Sampdoria in the Coppa Italia quarter-final. The midfield "experiment" continued in a 0–0 draw against Lazio, though this time, Silva was compared to another legendary Milan midfielder, Frank Rijkaard. Silva was lauded by Italian media for his display against Napoli, marking-out star striker Edinson Cavani. Milan won 3–0. One publication claimed that Silva and Nesta "made a ghost" of Cavani, whereas another claimed that Cavani had a "nightmare".

In the match that sealed the Scudetto for Milan, Silva anchored the Rossoneri to a 3–0 victory in the Derby della Madonnina against city rivals Inter. At the end of the season, Silva extended his contract to June 2016. Silva managed to complete the entire 2010–11 Serie A having earned only one yellow card, and having committed 26 fouls in 33 total matches. Silva's individual season was met with praise from all across Europe. In a fan vote, Silva was selected as Milan Player of the Season with 66.6% of the vote. La Gazzetta dello Sport rated him as the Player of the Season. Silva was selected as Goal's Serie A Player of the Season, and was also voted as the best defender in the league by Italian media and his fellow professionals.

==== 2011–12: Final campaign in Italy ====
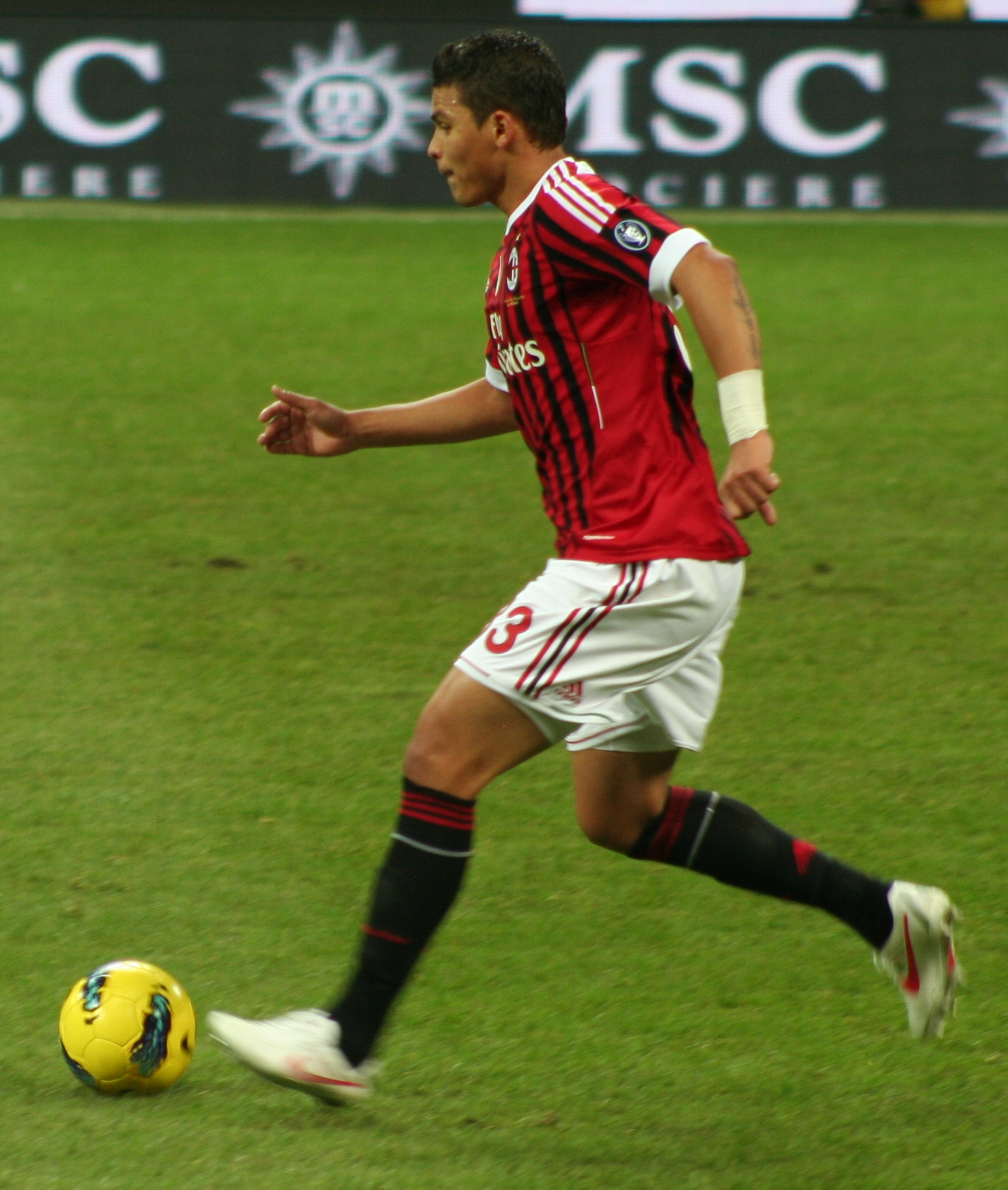
Silva playing for Milan against Siena in December 2011

Milan's season began with a 2–1 victory over Inter in the 2011 Supercoppa Italiana; Silva was the best defender in the match and one of the best overall performers, making a decisive last-man tackle on Samuel Eto'o to deny a clear chance in the first half. Milan began the 2011–12 Serie A in poor form, winning only two points in the first three matches, though Silva was one of the better players in the draws against Lazio and Udinese. In a Champions League group stage match against Barcelona, Silva and Alessandro Nesta were crucial in the 2–2 result; both defenders were regarded as two of the best performers by Italian and Catalan media. In the match, Silva scored the 90th-minute equaliser — his former coach Carlo Ancelotti predicted that Silva would score that goal.

A knee contusion in a 3–0 victory over Palermo on 15 October kept Silva out for two matches. In Silva's 75th Serie A match for Milan, played on 19 November, he was vital in maintaining a clean sheet against Fiorentina. The next week, Silva was named captain against Chievo, in the process becoming the first foreign captain in 50 years for Milan. In the 4–0 demolition at the San Siro, Silva scored his first goal as captain, while teammate Zlatan Ibrahimović also scored his 100th Serie A goal in the same match. On 1 December, Silva was shortlisted for the FIFPro World XI. 1994 World Cup-winning coach Carlos Alberto Parreira regarded Silva as the best Brazilian footballer in Europe.

On 9 January, Silva was compared to Milan's greatest player, Franco Baresi, by his teammate Gennaro Gattuso. On 13 January, Zlatan Ibrahimović claimed that Silva was the best defender he had ever played with. Silva was voted into the 2011 UEFA Team of the Year on 18 January. Silva was selected as man of the match in a 0–0 draw against Napoli in February. In Milan's 4–0 win over Arsenal in the Champions League Round of 16, Silva successfully marked-out Robin van Persie, who was in a great run of form. Silva played his last full league match for Milan on 17 March against Parma, playing an important role in the 2–0 victory. Manchester United captain Nemanja Vidić said that Silva was the best defender in the world in an interview on 22 March.

"It's difficult to identify where he can still improve. He has already proven to have everything."

— Franco Baresi, 2012

On 24 March, Silva was forced out of a match against Roma after ten minutes due to a serious injury. Although Milan originally claimed Silva would be out just four weeks, instead he missed seven weeks, including the Champions League quarter-finals against Barcelona, where Milan fell 1–3 on aggregate. Without Silva, Milan stuttered in the league and lost the Scudetto to rivals Juventus. It was argued that Silva's injury was the turning point in the title race: with Silva, Milan won 2.37 out of a possible 3 points per match, while without him Milan won 2.09 out of a possible 3 points. Silva's strong season finished in another nomination to the Serie A Team of the Year, being joint-best central defender alongside Juve stalwart Andrea Barzagli. He was also regarded as one of the best defenders in Italy by multiple independent publications.

=== Paris Saint-Germain ===
The negotiations to bring Silva to Paris Saint-Germain took place at the end of the 2011–12 season. The saga took over a month to complete. On 11 June 2012, it was reported that Milan legend Paolo Maldini would convince Silva to join PSG in the summer. Major French newspaper L'Équipe claimed that a transfer would be completed by 15 June. The same day, PSG sporting director — and former Milan coach — Leonardo officially declared interest in acquiring Silva. The next day, however, Milan general director Ariedo Braida claimed that Silva was not for sale. On 13 June, Maldini refuted claims that he would play a part in Silva's transfer, asserting the fact that he would never convince Silva to leave. Milan chairman Silvio Berlusconi mentioned a potential transfer on 13 June, saying that Silva needed to be sold for €46 million in order to balance the club's accounts. The next day, however, Berlusconi confirmed that Silva would be staying at Milan. Transfer news slowed down, and on 2 July, Milan extended Silva's contract to 2017, yet just 12 days later, Silva's transfer to PSG was confirmed. The transfer fee was rumoured to be around €42 million, which would have made Silva the most expensive defender in football history. Silva had repeatedly stressed the fact that he never pushed for a transfer, and that he was happy at Milan. Silva even mentioned that he would like to return to Milan later in his career.

==== 2012–13: Record transfer ====
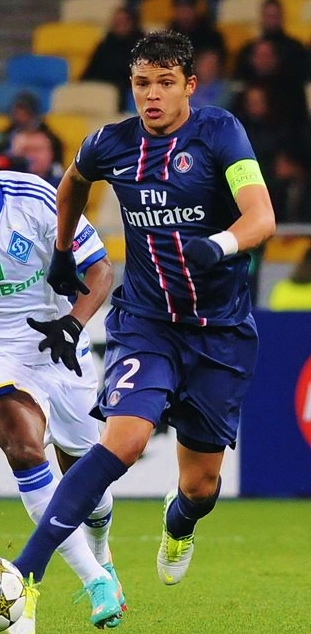
Silva playing for Paris Saint-Germain in 2013

At his arrival, Silva was presented to the media as the "best defender in the world" by PSG president Nasser Al-Khelaifi. Then PSG coach, and his former coach with Milan, Carlo Ancelotti, admitted to French media that Silva came to the club injured, and would not be able to participate immediately in matches. Thirteen days later, Silva was declared fit to play, in time for a Champions League group stage match against Dynamo Kyiv. On his debut, Silva scored the second goal in PSG's 4–1 victory. He played his first Ligue 1 match against Bastia, which PSG dominated, winning 4–0. On 20 October, Silva was played as a central midfielder in PSG's 1–0 win over Reims; Silva was commended for his display by teammate Salvatore Sirigu. Silva scored his second goal for the club in Le Classique — the derby between PSG and Marseille. He was praised for his defensive display in the match. On 16 December, Silva was praised for shackling Lyon forward Lisandro López in PSG's 1–0 win. For the 2012 football year, Silva was inducted into the UEFA Team of the Year for the second consecutive season.

In Silva's first match after the winter break, he was injured in a 0–0 draw against Ajaccio; the MRI confirmed damage to his left bicep, and Silva's recovery time was listed at three weeks. It was found that Silva's injury was more serious than initially diagnosed, and as a result Silva was actually inactive for almost two months. Silva made his return in the second leg of the Champions League Round of 16 against Valencia. Silva was outstanding in this match, being lauded heavily in France for an "extraterrestrial effort" against the Spanish side. In PSG's 1–0 victory over reigning champions Montpellier, Silva was regarded as the man of the match with a flawless defensive display. Silva received the Ligue 1 Player of the Month award for March, with 71% of the vote, after several fantastic performances. This was followed by a unanimously exalted performance against Barcelona, where Silva was described as "a wall" by French and Catalan media. Carlo Ancelotti claimed after the match that Silva was the best defender in the world, saying that Silva had all the ability to win the Ballon d'Or. PSG legend Ricardo Gomes claimed that Silva was one of Brazil's best-ever defenders, as well as saying that Silva was the best defender in the history of the club. In the return leg, Silva was again praised by Catalan media for a world-class performance.

"He is the Messi of defenders. The question is no longer if he is the best defender in the world, because he is quite simply one of the best players in the world — better than Cannavaro when he won the Ballon d'Or."

— Alain Roche, 2013

Silva continued his run of great performances in PSG's tight 1–0 victory against Troyes. Silva's season came to an end on 5 May when he received a straight red-card in a match against Valenciennes. He motioned to the referee, and put his hands on the referee's shoulder, which the referee deemed as a red-card offence. It was deemed to be a very harsh decision, with former referee Alain Sars claiming the expulsion was severe. Sporting director Leonardo said that the expulsion was "unacceptable", and Ancelotti said that he did not understand the reason for the expulsion. Nevertheless, at the end of the season Silva was voted into the 2012–13 Ligue 1 Team of the Year for his level of play throughout the season. Silva was also shortlisted for the Ligue 1 Player of the Year award, alongside teammates Blaise Matuidi and Zlatan Ibrahimović. Over the course of the season, Silva committed an extremely-low 14 fouls, which was mentioned as an excellent total for a defender in Le Parisien. Silva was considered the best defender in Ligue 1 by France Football.

==== 2013–14: Individual success and domestic treble ====
Silva's season began with a 2–1 victory in the Trophée des Champions against Bordeaux; Silva was voted as man of the match for his display. It was the first time Paris Saint-Germain had won the trophy since 1998. On 22 August 2013, it was announced that Silva had signed a one-year extension to his contract, keeping him at the club until 2018. In the rematch with Bordeaux at the Stade Chaban-Delmas, Silva put in another good performance as PSG won 2–0. Silva was forced off the field in the 16th minute against Monaco due to a left hamstring injury, which ultimately kept him out for six weeks. Coming back from his injury, Silva played extremely well against Nice, out-dueling the league's second top-scorer, Darío Cvitanich. Silva had an unusual run of scoring form, netting three times in seven matches. Silva scored in PSG's 4–0 victory over Lyon, 5–0 victory over Sochaux, and 4–0 victory over Nantes. France Football rated Silva as the best central defender in Ligue 1 at the half-way point of the season. At the end of the 2013 football year, Silva was inducted into the 2013 UEFA Team of the Year for the third consecutive year, making him joint-fifth in all-time appearances. Silva was also voted by his fellow professionals in the 2013 FIFPro Team of the Year for the first time in his career.

On 15 January 2014, Manchester United central defender Rio Ferdinand claimed that Silva was, by a distance, the best defender in the world. Silva was imperious in PSG's 2–0 win against Bordeaux at the Parc des Princes, where he covered for the errors of teammate Gregory van der Wiel and was even close to scoring himself. This performance was followed by another strong performance against Monaco; despite scoring an unlucky own-goal, Silva made crucial interventions throughout the match, including a last-man block against striker Emmanuel Rivière. In PSG's comprehensive 4–0 win in the Champions League over Bayer Leverkusen, Silva was regarded by Le Parisien as having "dominated" then Bundesliga leading-scorer Stefan Kießling. Marseille defender Lucas Mendes said that Silva was the best defender in the world, and that Silva was his role model as a footballer. On 16 February, Ronaldo, the three-time FIFA World Player of the Year, compared the qualities of Silva to legendary German sweeper Franz Beckenbauer. Silva managed another accomplished display in Le Classique, marshaling the club's defence to a clean sheet and helping extend its lead to eight points at the top of the Ligue 1 table.

"Thiago Silva is without doubt the best central defender in the world. He has incredible qualities. He is a symbol of elegance like Franz Beckenbauer was. Silva follows in his footsteps."

— Ronaldo, 2014

In the Champions League quarter-finals against Chelsea, Silva conceded his first penalty in over three years, but recovered well in the 3–1 first leg victory — Silva's overall defensive effort was well-recognised by both English and French media. In the second-leg, however, Chelsea prevailed on away goals after a late goal from substitute Demba Ba. On 19 April, Silva captained PSG to a 2–1 victory in the 2014 Coupe de la Ligue Final, the first time the club had won the competition since 1998. Despite losing 1–2 to Rennes, PSG clinched the league title; Silva had captained the club to their second consecutive league title, and their first double. Silva again was shortlisted for Ligue 1 Player of the Year, and named in the Ligue 1 Team of the Year for the second consecutive season. Silva was rated by France Football as the league's fifth-best player, as well as the best defender in Ligue 1.

==== 2014–15: Domestic quadruple ====
Silva's season began poorly in PSG's 2–2 draw with Reims; he was rated as one of PSG's worst players in his first match back from the 2014 World Cup. In his post-match interview, Silva mentioned how he was not fully fit and that he was finding it difficult to forget Brazil's embarrassing loss to Germany, where Brazil capitulated without him. Only three days after the match against Reims, Silva's rush to get back to full fitness was halted as he suffered a serious thigh injury in a friendly against Napoli on 11 August; he only lasted 13 minutes before being carried off the pitch. After nine weeks, Silva was finally pronounced fit on 16 October by manager Laurent Blanc, who also said that Silva would be able to start the next league match against Bordeaux. In his return, he had an excellent display alongside fellow countryman David Luiz as PSG dominated Bordeaux, winning 3–0. A third of the way into the season, it was observed that Silva's performances were marked with inconsistency, especially throughout November and December. After PSG's 1–3 loss to Barcelona in December, he was criticised by former PSG player Pierre Ducrocq, who argued that Silva did not have any physical or technical problems, but instead a mentality issue. Despite his struggles, Silva was recognised by his peers as being one of the two best central defenders in the world, as he was voted into the 2015 FIFPro World XI for the second consecutive year.

The 2015 calendar year began extremely well for Silva, with a man of the match display against Saint-Étienne in a 1–0 victory. It was followed by another man of the match performance, this time in a 1–0 win against Rennes. After the match, Rennes captain Sylvain Armand had nothing but praise for Silva, saying "he [Silva] is a monster and a phenomenon". Four days later, Silva was voted as man of the match in PSG's 1–0 Coupe de la Ligue win against Lille. Silva's return to form was evident and it met praise from across the country — Pierre Ménès of L'Équipe offered his praise, while Alain Roche of Le Parisien stated that he was back to his best. After PSG's 1–1 draw with Chelsea in the first leg of the 2014–15 Champions League Round of 16, Silva was unanimously praised by the French press for his outstanding defensive showing as he marked-out striker Diego Costa. Three days later, he was voted man of the match as he scored his first goal of the season in a 3–1 victory over Toulouse.

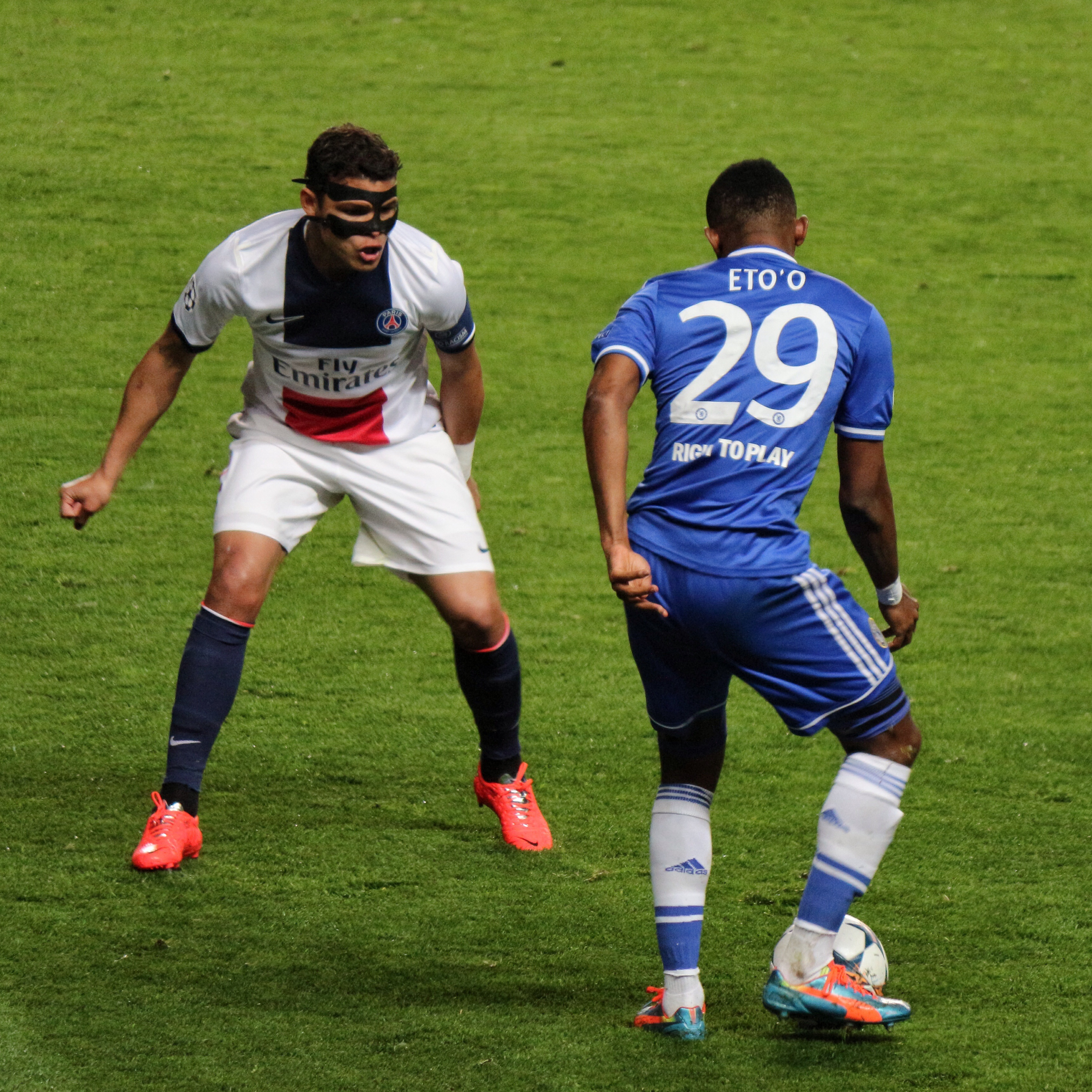
Silva (left) in action for Paris Saint-Germain in 2014

L'Équipe recognised Silva's incredible performances in January and February with a detailed analysis of his performances — in 2015, Silva was winning 89% of his duels, best in Ligue 1; Silva had 2.9 interceptions, 3.4 tackles, and 7.6 clearances per match, best in Ligue 1; lastly, Silva had committed a remarkable 0 fouls in 630 minutes of play. In a 2–0 win against Monaco in the Coupe de France quarterfinal, Silva was praised for his dominance: one publication noted, "if you thought Dimitar Berbatov [of Monaco] was silent and invisible throughout the match, it was only due to the work of the Monster". In the second leg of the 2014–15 Champions League Round of 16, Silva conceded a controversial penalty in the 96th minute. PSG were poised to be eliminated from the Champions League but in the 114th minute, Silva atoned for his error with a towering header to beat Thibaut Courtois to help PSG advance to the next stage. Silva was voted by several media sources as the best player in the match as he produced an extraordinary performance.

PSG finally took pole position in the league after their 2–3 win over Marseille; Silva was dominant in his duels and played a crucial role in the victory. Three days later, he was voted man of the match in a 4–1 victory against Saint-Étienne in the Coupe de France semi-final. On 11 April, Silva captained the club to a 4–0 win in the Coupe de la Ligue final against Bastia. Four days later, Silva suffered an injury in the 20th minute of PSG's quarterfinal against Barcelona. He was ruled out for two weeks as PSG were comprehensively beaten 1–5 on aggregate by Barça. Upon his return in a 3–1 win against Metz, Silva had a comfortable performance as PSG moved closer to the title. After an incredible 6–0 win against Guingamp which edged the club closer to the first possible French domestic treble, Silva claimed that this PSG side was the best he had ever played in. One week later, PSG clinched the Ligue 1 title in a hard-fought 2–1 away win at Montpellier; Silva was voted man of the match and he was hailed for marking out Lucas Barrios. In the final match of the season, Silva was rated as the best player on the pitch in PSG's 3–2 win against Reims. For the third consecutive season, Silva was voted by his peers into the Ligue 1 Team of the Year. Silva was also selected in Opta's Ligue 1 Team of the Season based on statistical merit.

==== 2015–2020: Sustained domestic success, European final ====
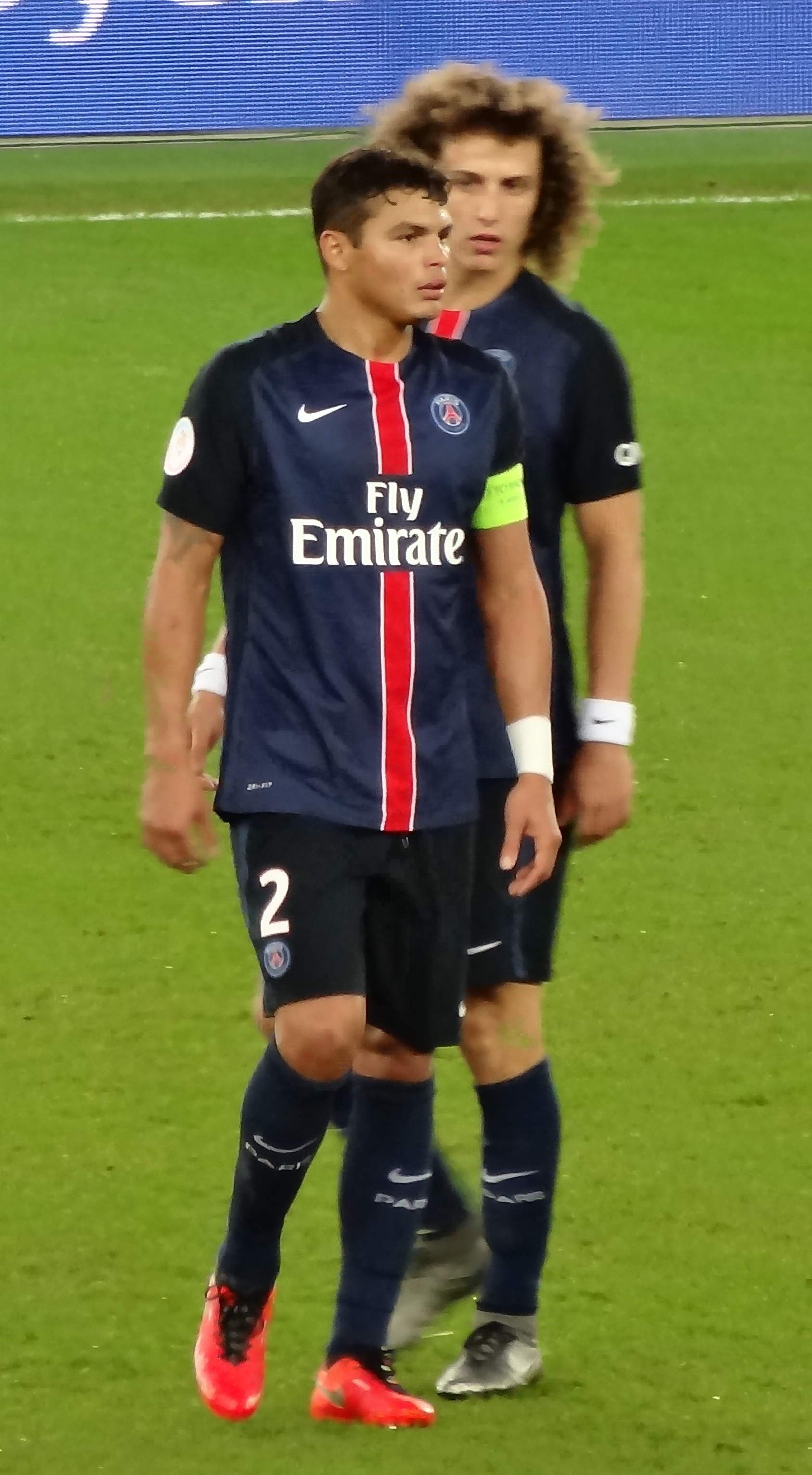
Silva and David Luiz playing for Paris Saint-Germain in 2016

After playing in the 2015 Copa América, Silva finally returned to club training on 20 July in New Jersey. The first pre-season match that Silva played in was the final match of the 2015 International Champions Cup against Manchester United, where PSG won 2–0 to win the trophy; Silva was rated as the best player in the match. Two days later, Silva captained PSG to a 2–0 victory in the 2015 Trophée des Champions against Lyon. Silva had a good match with little to do defensively, as Lyon's star striker Alexandre Lacazette played an insignificant role in the match.

PSG began their league campaign with a 1–0 victory against Lille, playing with ten-men for two-thirds of the match. Silva had a superb display, leading the defence to a hard-fought clean sheet. His performance was described as dominant, showcasing his intelligence and athleticism throughout the match. On 8 May 2018, he played as PSG won 2–0 against Les Herbiers VF to clinch the 2017–18 Coupe de France.

In April 2020, PSG were awarded the 2019–20 Ligue 1 title after the season was ended prematurely due to the outbreak of the COVID-19 pandemic; at the time of the League's suspension, PSG were in first place, with a twelve–point lead over second–placed Marseille. This was Silva's record seventh Ligue 1 title with the club, which saw him equal the all–time individual record of most Ligue 1 title victories, along with his club teammate Marco Verratti, which was jointly held by Hervé Revelli and Jean-Michel Larqué of Saint-Étienne, as well as Grégory Coupet, Juninho and Sidney Govou of Lyon. On 13 June, PSG's sporting director Leonardo revealed that Thiago Silva would be leaving the club at the end of the Champions League campaign in August, alongside his teammate Edinson Cavani. PSG completed a domestic treble, while his last competitive match for PSG was the 2020 UEFA Champions League Final on 23 August, which PSG lost 1–0 to Bayern Munich. However, Silva became the first Brazilian to start a Champions League Final as a captain.

=== Chelsea ===
==== 2020–21: Debut season and European glory ====
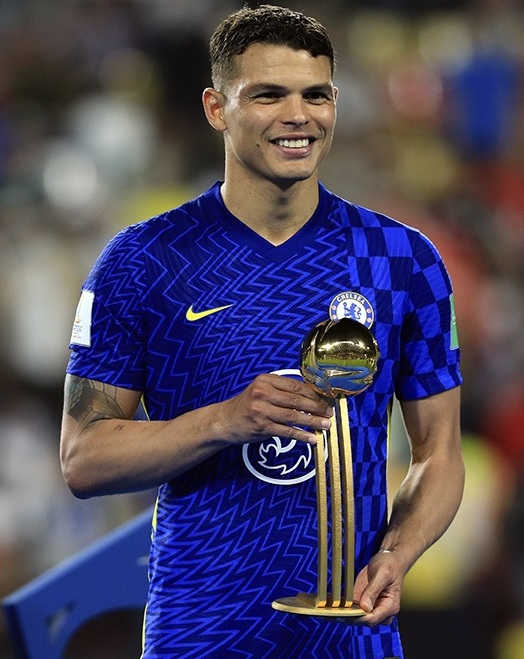
Silva celebrating Chelsea winning the 2021 FIFA Club World Cup

On 28 August 2020, Silva joined Premier League club Chelsea on a one-year deal with an option for a second. He made his debut for the club on 23 September, in a 6–0 home win over Barnsley in the third round of the EFL Cup. Three days later on 26 September, Silva made his Premier League debut in a 3–3 draw against West Bromwich Albion at The Hawthorns as captain. On 7 November, Silva scored his first goal for Chelsea in a 4–1 home league win over Sheffield United. On 21 December, Silva scored his second goal for Chelsea in a 3–0 victory over West Ham.

On 3 April 2021, Silva received a second yellow card and got sent off in the 29th minute in Chelsea's 5–2 home defeat to West Bromwich Albion. Silva led the defence as Chelsea reached its third Champions League final, defeating Real Madrid in the semi-finals. On 29 May, Silva went off injured in the 39th minute while he won his first Champions League trophy after Chelsea's 1–0 victory against Manchester City in the 2021 UEFA Champions League Final at the Estádio do Dragão.

On 4 June 2021, Chelsea announced the extension of his contract for another year, keeping him at the club until June 2022.

==== 2021–24: 100 Champions League appearances and departure ====
Life is hard for those who are soft. If it's up to me, I'll get up every time I fall.

— Silva, reflecting on a turbulent 2022–23 season for Chelsea.

On 4 December 2021, Silva scored in a 3–2 league loss to West Ham, becoming, at the age of 37 years and 73 days, the club's oldest ever goalscorer in the Premier League, surpassing the previous record set by Didier Drogba in 2015. The following month, on 3 January 2022, he extended his contract again, this time until the end of the 2022–23 season. Later that month, on 23 January, he score against Tottenham to seal a 2–0 league win, becoming, at the age of 37 years and 123 days, the oldest player to score in the Premier League since the 39-year-old Ryan Giggs in February 2013. In the first leg of the UCL Round of 16 against Lille on 22 February, Silva won possession 12 times, a personal best in a UCL match. During a 2–4 league loss to Arsenal on 20 April 2022, he became Chelsea's oldest outfield player in the Premier League (37y and 210d), breaking Graham Rix's record from 1995 by seven days.

On 11 October 2022, Silva made his 100th Champions League appearance in a 2–0 away win against his former club Milan. On 10 February 2023, he extended his contract by another year, taking his contract to the end of the 2023–24 season. On 28 February 2023, the club announced he would be out of action for an unspecified time after suffering ligament damage in a game against Tottenham. In April, Silva was in the starting lineup for the two-legged Quarter Final tie against Real Madrid, which Chelsea lost 4–0 on aggregate. In a post-match interview, Silva hinted that he might have played his last game in the Champions League.

On 28 May 2023, before Chelsea played their final game of the season against Newcastle, Thiago Silva was named Chelsea's Player of the Year, becoming the first defender to win the award since John Terry in 2006. On 12 November 2023, Silva scored against Manchester City in a 4–4 draw, becoming, at the age of 39 years and 51 days, the oldest goalscorer in Chelsea's history, breaking a 76-year-old record set by Dick Spence in 1947. Two weeks later, on 25 November, he became the club's oldest-ever outfield player, surpassing Spence again. On 7 April 2024, he opened the scoring in a 2–2 league draw with Sheffield United, becoming, at the age of 39 years and 198 days, the third-oldest player to score away from home in the Premier League, as well as the third-oldest overall, only behind Dean Windass and Teddy Sheringham. He also became only the second 39-year-old player to score three or more goals in a single league season, after Sheringham in 2005–06.

On 29 April 2024, Chelsea announced that Silva would depart the club at the end of the season, after spending four years at the club.

=== Return to Fluminense ===
On 7 May 2024, Silva agreed to join Fluminense as a free agent in July 2024 on a two-year deal, returning to his home club fifteen and a half years later. The defender helped Fluminense escape near-guaranteed relegation - the club was 20th when he joined before embarking on a 10-game streak without conceding a single league goal, largely due to the defender's influence.

On 18 December 2025, Silva departed Fluminense to pursue a return to European football, with the aim of securing a place at the World Cup the following summer.

=== Return to Porto ===
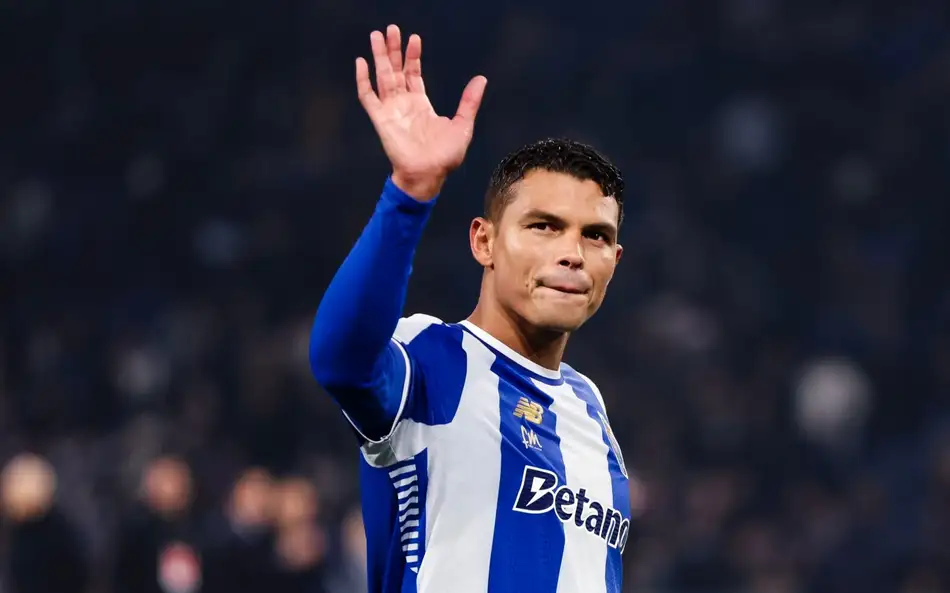
Thiago Silva playing for Porto

On 25 December 2025, Silva returned to Porto, this time as part of the main team, signing a contract until the end of the 2025–26 season, with an option for a further year. He made his debut on 14 January 2026, starting in a 1–0 victory over rivals Benfica in the quarter-finals of the Taça de Portugal, overtaking Pepe as the oldest player to ever represent Porto. He ultimately won the Primeira Liga title with the club.

=== Third stint at Fluminense ===
On 22 June 2026, Fluminense confirmed Silva's return to the club, with the player signing a contract valid until December 2026.

== International career ==
=== Early career and 2008 Olympics ===
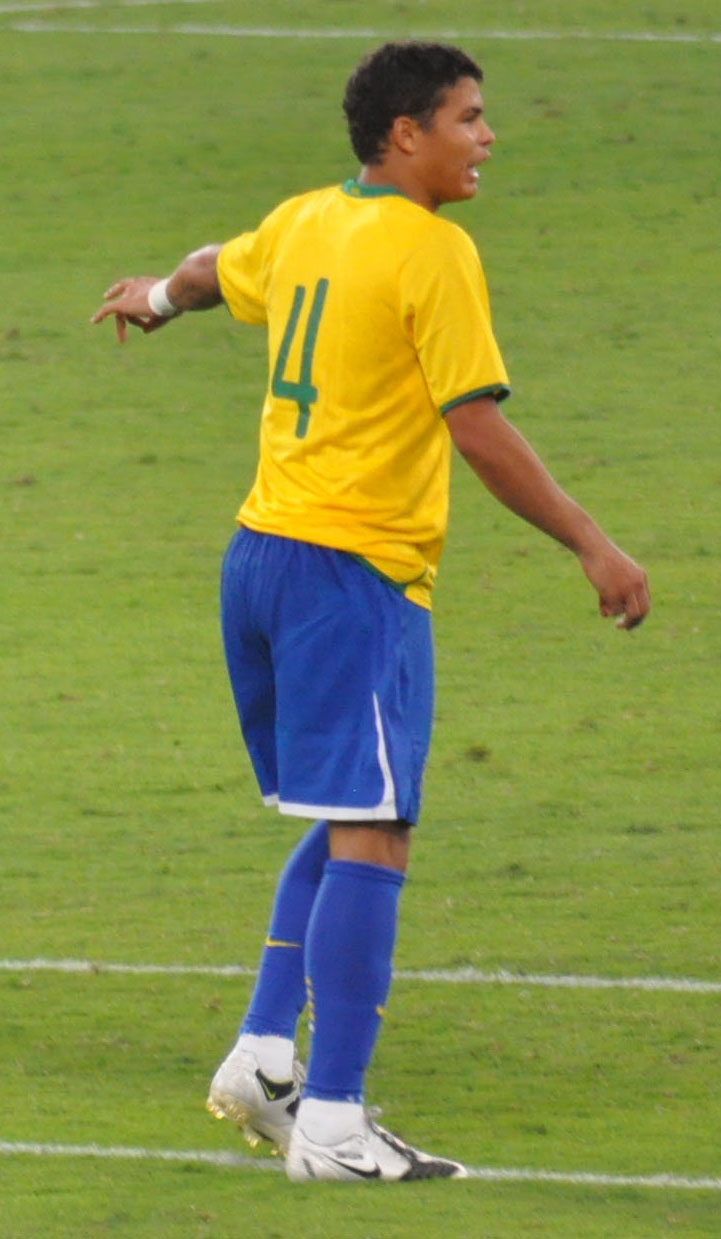
Silva playing for Brazil in a friendly against England in November 2009

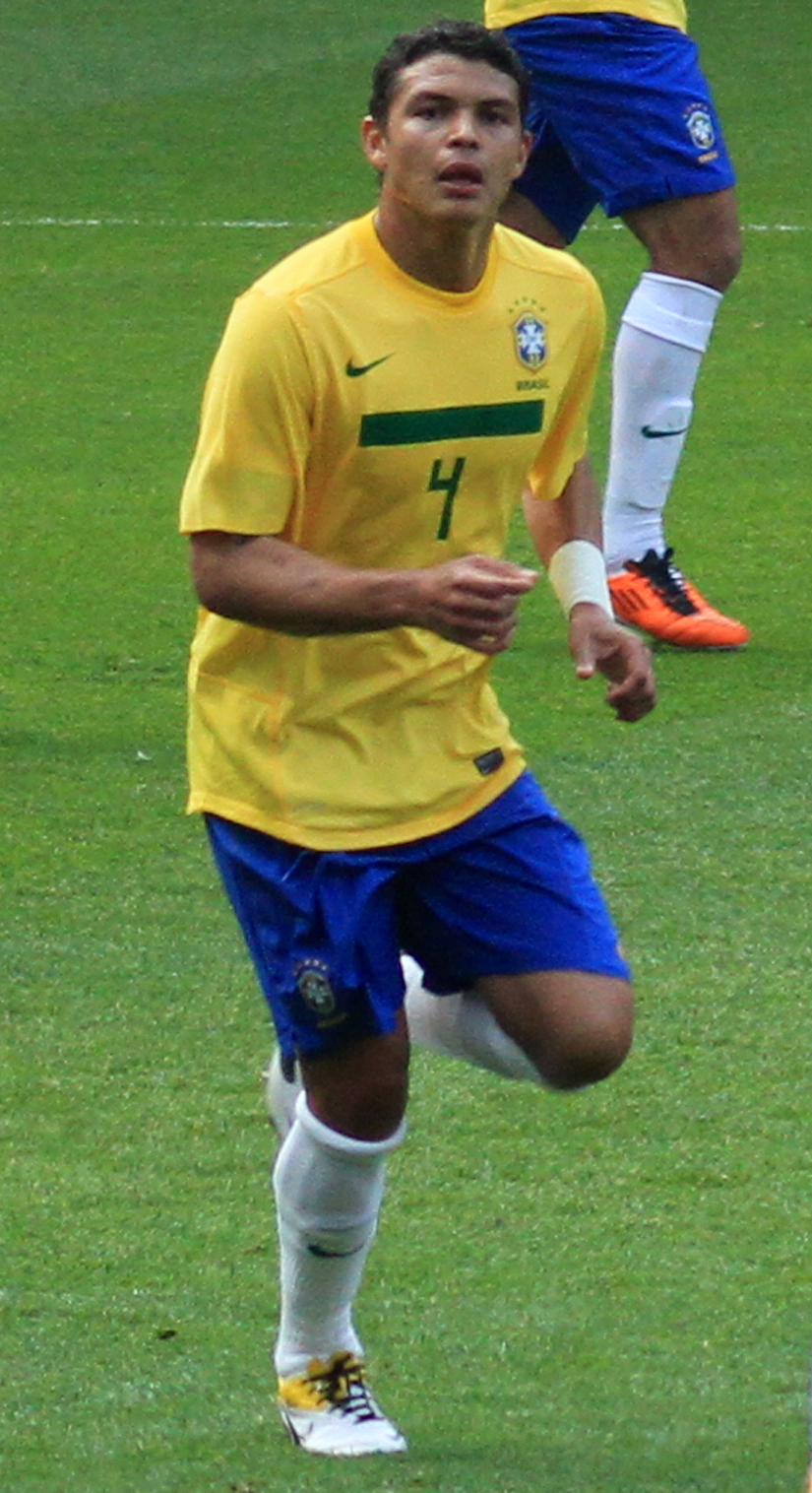
Silva in a friendly against Scotland in March 2011

After a strong season with Fluminense, Silva was called up to the Brazil preliminary squad for the 2007 Copa América, though he was not a part of the main team which ultimately won the tournament. Silva was then called up for a friendly against Algeria on 15 August, failing to leave the bench, as Brazil won 2–0. Silva was then selected by Dunga to play in the 2008 Summer Olympics, one of two overage players, alongside Ronaldinho. Silva won his first two caps for Brazil in pre-Olympic friendlies against Singapore and Vietnam, though he suffered a right calf injury against Vietnam that kept him out of Brazil's first Olympic match. He was finally pronounced fit for the third group match, where Silva started and Brazil won 3–0 against China. He did not start any other matches, only coming on in the 71st minute against Belgium in the third-place match, which sealed the bronze medal for Brazil.

Silva's next cap came in an international friendly against Portugal on 20 November 2008; Brazil won by a convincing 6–2 scoreline, and Silva was praised for having "dominated" the reigning FIFA World Player of the Year, Cristiano Ronaldo. Silva was praised by his teammates for his performance. He was not a starter during the 2010 World Cup qualifications for Brazil, despite his high level of club performances for Milan. He was still playing in friendly matches, and in a November 2009 friendly against England, Silva put in a man of the match display in Doha.

=== 2010 World Cup, 2011 Copa América, and 2012 Olympics ===
Silva was an unused substitute in all matches at the 2010 FIFA World Cup, where Brazil were defeated in the quarter-finals by the eventual finalists, the Netherlands. Silva was selected as captain by new Brazil coach Mano Menezes ahead of the 2014 World Cup qualifying cycle, replacing Lúcio. At the 2011 Copa América, Brazil lost in a penalty shootout to Paraguay in the quarter-finals. Silva scored his first goal for Brazil in a friendly match against the United States. At the 2012 Summer Olympics, Mexico surprised Brazil in the final to win 2–1.

=== 2013 Confederations Cup title ===
Silva's first international trophy came at the 2013 FIFA Confederations Cup, held in Brazil. As a warm-up tournament to the 2014 World Cup, Brazil won the tournament while scoring 14 goals and conceding 3. Silva was rated as the tenth-best player at the end of the group stages, and by the end of the tournament, he was rated as the fifth-best player of the tournament by the Castrol Performance Index. Silva was also voted into the Confederations Cup Dream Team by FIFA.com users.

=== 2014 World Cup ===
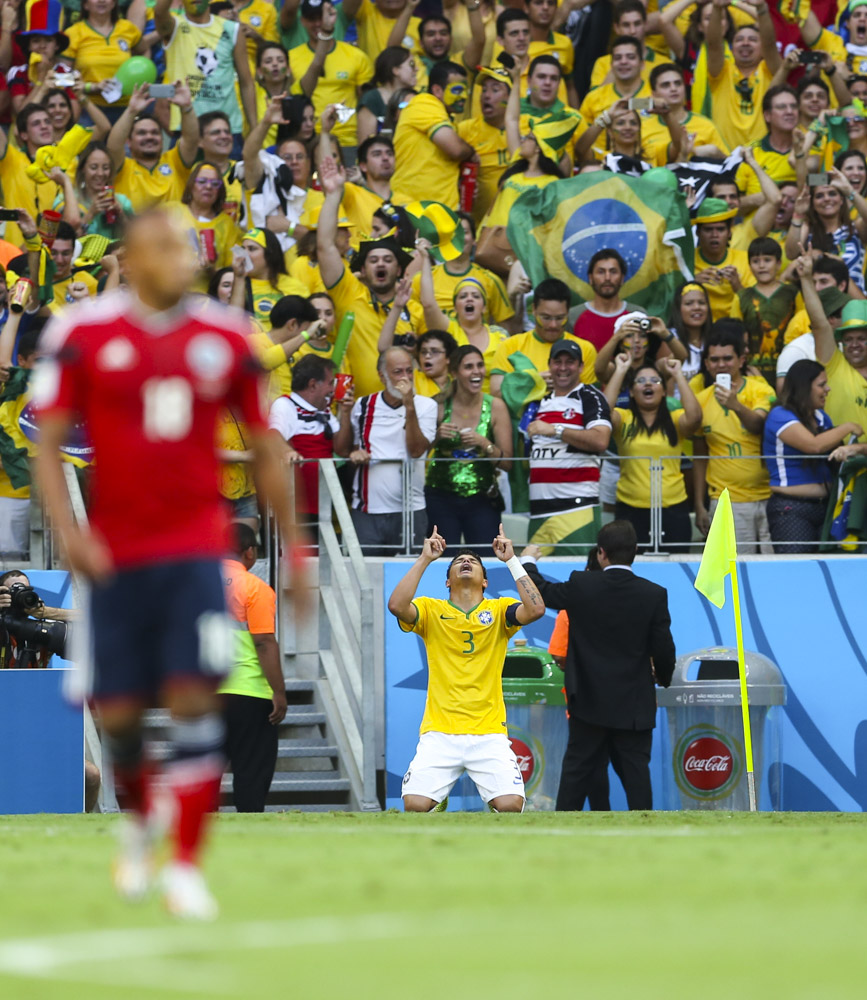
Silva celebrating Brazil's victory against Colombia at the 2014 World Cup

With Silva playing for the first time at a World Cup, hosts Brazil won 3–1 against Croatia in their first match at the 2014 World Cup, held on home soil. Silva was regarded as Brazil's best player in their second match, a 0–0 draw against Mexico, making several crucial interventions and getting involved offensively. In the final group match against Cameroon, Silva was praised by pundits for a 4–1 win. At the end of the group stage, FIFA rated Silva as the third-best defender of the tournament, and the ninth-best player overall.

In Brazil's victory over Chile in the round of 16, Silva assisted the opening goal scored by David Luiz. Chile equalised, and after no goals were scored in extra-time, the match went to a penalty shootout. Silva faced severe criticism for his behaviour, as he was pictured in tears before and during the shootout. 1970 World Cup-winning captain Carlos Alberto asserted that Silva was a weak captain, while Brazilian legend Zico insisted that Silva should have volunteered to take a penalty, instead of refusing to take one. After the Round of 16, Silva was still regarded as one of the best defenders of the tournament by multiple media sources.

Silva scored the opening goal in the quarterfinal against Colombia, and was seen as a top performer in the match; however, he picked up his second yellow card of the tournament for obstructing goalkeeper David Ospina, which ruled him out of the semi-final. Brazil tried to appeal his yellow card, but it was immediately rejected. Nevertheless, at the end of the quarter-final stage, Silva was rated by FIFA as the second-best defender of the tournament, and the fourth-best player overall. Silva's suspension brought apprehension to the team; José Mourinho even claimed that Silva was Brazil's most important player, praising the stability Silva offers to the defence.

Silva was replaced by Bayern Munich defender Dante. Without Silva as captain, Brazil lost by a record 1–7 scoreline to Germany. Numerous outlets claimed that Silva's absence played a crucial part in the result.

In the third-place match, Silva returned in a 3–0 loss to the Netherlands. In the second minute of the game, Silva pulled down Arjen Robben, as he ran into Júlio César's box with the ball for a clear goal-scoring opportunity. Under FIFA rules Silva ought to have been shown a red card, but he was shown a yellow card instead by the Algerian referee Djamel Haimoudi. The referee called for a penalty, while the foul happened outside the box, which was successfully scored by Robin van Persie.

At the conclusion of the tournament, Silva was rated by FIFA as the third-best central defender, and the eighth-best player overall. Silva was selected into the FIFA World Cup Dream Team voted by FIFA.com users, and the Castrol World Cup Top XI based on statistical merit.

=== 2015 Copa América ===
Brazil, under Dunga's second stint as manager, went to the 2015 Copa América in Chile with Neymar as the captain. After his suspension for the remainder of the tournament in their second game, however, the armband did not go back to Silva, but rather to his defensive partner, Miranda. In Brazil's final group match against Venezuela at the Estadio Monumental David Arellano in Santiago, Silva opened the scoring in the ninth minute, volleying in a corner from Robinho. The eventual 2–1 victory sent Brazil into the quarter-finals as group winners. In the 70th minute of the quarter-final, Silva's handball gave Paraguay the penalty kick from which they equalised for a 1–1 draw; Brazil lost in the subsequent penalty shoot-out.

=== 2018 World Cup and 2019 Copa América title ===
On 14 May 2018, Silva was named by Tite to captain the squad for the 2018 World Cup in Russia. He would play the full 90 minutes of all five of Brazil's matches at the tournament, before they were eliminated by Belgium in the quarter-finals. Silva managed to score during Brazil's final group stage match on 27 June, getting the second goal in his side's 2–0 win against Serbia.

In May 2019, Silva was included in Brazil's 23-man squad for the 2019 Copa América on home soil. He would go on to play every minute for Brazil as they won the tournament, concluding with a 3–1 final victory against Peru on 7 July at the Maracanã.

=== 2021 Copa América runner-up and appearance milestones ===
In June 2021, Silva was included in Brazil's squad for the 2021 Copa América, again held on home soil. He played the full 90 minutes for Brazil in two of their group stage games and all three of their knockout stage fixtures, including their 1–0 defeat to rivals Argentina in the final on 10 July.

On 10 October 2021, Silva made his 100th appearance for Brazil in a goalless 2022 World Cup qualification draw against Colombia. In September 2022, he became the most-capped centre-back in the history of the Brazil national team, surpassing Lúcio.

=== 2022 World Cup ===
On 7 November 2022, Silva was named to Brazil's 26-man squad for the 2022 World Cup in Qatar.

Silva started and played the full 90 minutes of Brazil's first two group matches against Serbia and Switzerland. He then assisted Richarlison's goal in a 4–1 round of 16 victory against South Korea on 5 December. Four days later, Silva played the full 120 minutes of Brazil's quarter-final elimination by Croatia, losing on penalties after extra time.

=== 2026 World Cup ===
Having not been called up since Qatar, he was included in the preliminary squad of 55 players for Brazil in the 2026 World Cup announced by Carlo Ancelotti on 12 May 2026, but did not make the final cut.

== Style of play ==
Silva has been recognised as a complete defender by his peers and critics. He has been described as a consistent defender, without any flaws, and someone who can lead any defence. A leader from the back, Silva's play has led him to be compared to legendary Italian defender Franco Baresi. Baresi, regarded as one of the greatest defenders in football history, has gone on record to state that Silva is the defender who most resembles him, and said in June 2012 that Silva was his "heir". Although he has been criticised at times in the media over his mentality, his leadership skills are also apparent through his success in captaining both Brazil and Paris Saint-Germain.

Silva is noted for his pace, strength, and aerial ability. He combines his physical attributes with positional awareness and tactical discipline, making him effective in one-on-one defending, anticipating plays, and regaining possession. Known for his technical skill and composure on the ball, he is capable of creating chances in attack from the back with his passing. During his prime, Silva was widely regarded as one of the top central defenders in world football. He was voted among the top two central defenders in Europe for three consecutive years, and both Rio Ferdinand and Ronaldo described him as the best defender in the world in 2014. While predominantly a centre-back, he has occasionally played as a central or defensive midfielder. Although his career has been impacted by injuries throughout, he has received praise for his longevity.

== Personal life ==
Silva and his wife Isabele have two sons, Isago and Iago, who are part of the Chelsea F.C. Development Squad and Academy. Iago is also a youth international for England. Silva is a Christian. On 15 March 2019 after playing almost seven years in France with Paris Saint-Germain, Thiago announced that he, his wife and children had also become French citizens. Thiago speaks Italian, English, French, Spanish and Portuguese.

Produced by Fulwell 73, FIFA released Captains in 2022, an eight-part sports docuseries following six national team captains in their respective 2022 FIFA World Cup qualification campaigns. Silva, representing Brazil, starred alongside Luka Modrić (Croatia), Pierre-Emerick Aubameyang (Gabon), Andre Blake (Jamaica), Hassan Maatouk (Lebanon) and Brian Kaltak (Vanuatu). It was released by Netflix and also shown on FIFA's own streaming platform, FIFA+.

== Career statistics ==
=== Club ===
As of match played 19 November 2026

Appearances and goals by club, season and competition
Club	Season	League			State league (Note: Includes Campeonato Gaúcho, Campeonato Carioca)		National cup (Note: Includes Copa do Brasil, Coppa Italia, Coupe de France, FA Cup, Taça de Portugal)		League cup (Note: Includes Coupe de la Ligue, EFL Cup)		Continental		Other		Total	
Club	Season	Division	Apps	Goals	Apps	Goals	Apps	Goals	Apps	Goals	Apps	Goals	Apps	Goals	Apps	Goals
RS Futebol	2002	Gaúcho Série B	—		8	2	—		—		—		—		8	2
RS Futebol	2003	Gaúcho Série A2	—		17	0	—		—		—		—		17	0
RS Futebol	Total		—		25	2	—		—		—		—		25	2
Juventude	2004	Série A	28	3	7	0	1	0	—		—		—		36	3
Porto B	2004–05	Segunda Divisão B	14	0	—		—		—		—		—		14	0
Dynamo Moscow	2005	Russian Premier League	0	0	—		0	0	—		0	0	—		0	0
Fluminense (loan)	2006	Série A	31	0	4	0	7	0	—		4 (Note: Appearances in Copa Sudamericana)	0	—		46	0
Fluminense	2007	Série A	30	5	9	0	12	3	—		—		—		51	8
Fluminense	2008	Série A	20	1	14	3	—		—		12 (Note: Appearances in Copa Libertadores)	2	—		46	6
Fluminense	Total		81	6	27	3	19	3	—		16	2	—		143	14
Milan	2009–10	Serie A	33	2	—		0	0	—		7 (Note: Appearances in UEFA Champions League)	0	—		40	2
Milan	2010–11	Serie A	33	1	—		3	0	—		6	0	—		42	1
Milan	2011–12	Serie A	27	2	—		2	0	—		7	1	1 (Note: Appearance in Supercoppa Italiana)	0	37	3
Milan	Total		93	5	—		5	0	—		20	1	1	0	119	6
Paris Saint-Germain	2012–13	Ligue 1	22	0	—		1	0	2	1	9	2	—		34	3
Paris Saint-Germain	2013–14	Ligue 1	28	3	—		2	0	4	0	7	0	1 (Note: Appearance in Trophée des Champions)	0	42	3
Paris Saint-Germain	2014–15	Ligue 1	26	1	—		5	0	3	0	6	1	0	0	40	2
Paris Saint-Germain	2015–16	Ligue 1	30	1	—		4	0	2	0	9	0	1	0	46	1
Paris Saint-Germain	2016–17	Ligue 1	27	3	—		3	1	3	2	7	0	0	0	40	6
Paris Saint-Germain	2017–18	Ligue 1	25	1	—		5	0	2	0	6	0	1	0	39	1
Paris Saint-Germain	2018–19	Ligue 1	25	0	—		4	0	2	0	7	0	1	0	39	0
Paris Saint-Germain	2019–20	Ligue 1	21	0	—		3	1	1	0	9	0	1	0	35	1
Paris Saint-Germain	Total		204	9	—		27	2	19	3	60	3	5	0	315	17
Chelsea	2020–21	Premier League	23	2	—		2	0	1	0	8	0	—		34	2
Chelsea	2021–22	Premier League	32	3	—		3	0	2	0	9	0	2 (Note: Appearances in FIFA Club World Cup)	0	48	3
Chelsea	2022–23	Premier League	27	0	—		0	0	0	0	8	0	—		35	0
Chelsea	2023–24	Premier League	31	3	—		4	1	3	0	—		—		38	4
Chelsea	Total		113	8	—		9	1	6	0	25	0	2	0	155	9
Fluminense	2024	Série A	15	0	—		1	0	—		4	1	—		20	1
Fluminense	2025	Série A	25	2	7	1	5	1	—		4	0	5	0	46	4
Fluminense	Total		40	2	7	1	6	1	—		8	1	5	0	66	5
Porto	2025–26	Primeira Liga	8	0	—		2	0	—		4 (Note: Appearances in UEFA Europa League)	0	—		14	0
Fluminense	2026	Série A	8	0	—		0	0	—		6	0	—		14	0
Career total			589	33	66	6	69	7	25	3	139	7	13	0	901	56

=== International ===
Appearances and goals by national team and year
National team	Year	Apps	Goals
Brazil	2008	3	0
Brazil	2009	3	0
Brazil	2010	5	0
Brazil	2011	13	0
Brazil	2012	8	1
Brazil	2013	12	1
Brazil	2014	9	1
Brazil	2015	6	1
Brazil	2016	1	0
Brazil	2017	7	1
Brazil	2018	10	1
Brazil	2019	12	1
Brazil	2020	4	0
Brazil	2021	9	0
Brazil	2022	11	0
Total		113	7

As of match played 9 December 2022
Scores and results list Brazil's goal tally first

List of international goals scored by Thiago Silva
No.	Date	Venue	Opponent	Score	Result	Competition
1	30 May 2012	FedExField, Landover, United States	United States	2–0	4–1	Friendly
2	10 September 2013	Gillette Stadium, Foxborough, United States	Portugal	1–1	3–1	Friendly
3	4 July 2014	Castelão, Fortaleza, Brazil	Colombia	1–0	2–1	2014 FIFA World Cup
4	21 June 2015	Estadio Monumental David Arellano, Santiago, Chile	Venezuela	1–0	2–1	2015 Copa América
5	13 June 2017	Melbourne Cricket Ground, Melbourne, Australia	Australia	2–0	4–0	Friendly
6	27 June 2018	Otkritie Arena, Moscow, Russia	Serbia	2–0	2–0	2018 FIFA World Cup
7	9 June 2019	Estádio Beira-Rio, Porto Alegre, Brazil	Honduras	2–0	7–0	Friendly

== Honours ==
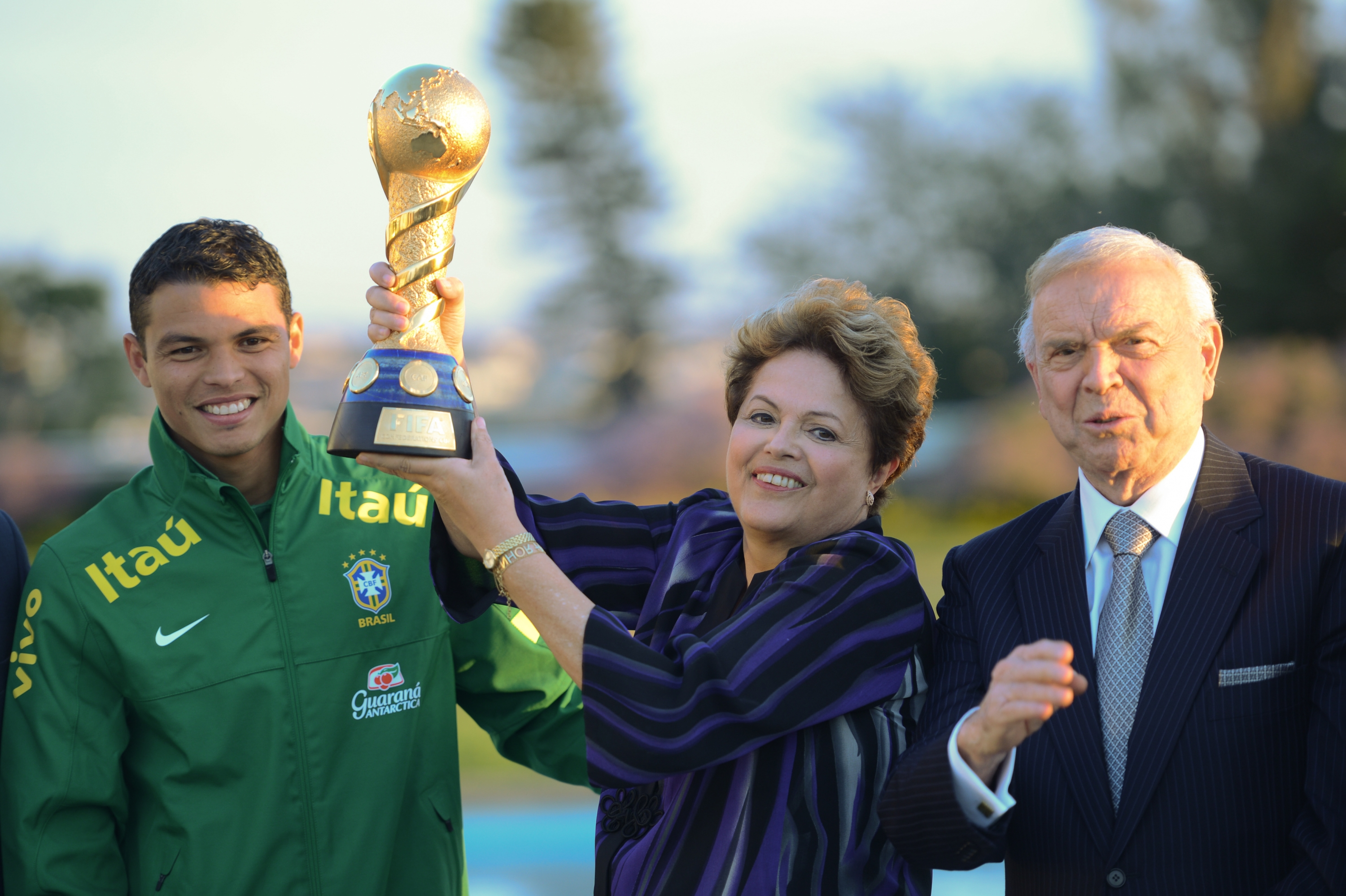
Thiago Silva and Brazil president Dilma Rousseff with the 2013 Confederations Cup trophy

Fluminense

- Copa do Brasil: 2007

Milan

- Serie A: 2010–11
- Supercoppa Italiana: 2011

Paris Saint-Germain

- Ligue 1: 2012–13, 2013–14, 2014–15, 2015–16, 2017–18, 2018–19, 2019–20
- Coupe de France: 2014–15, 2015–16, 2016–17, 2017–18, 2019–20
- Coupe de la Ligue: 2013–14, 2014–15, 2015–16, 2016–17, 2017–18, 2019–20
- Trophée des Champions: 2013, 2015, 2017, 2018, 2019

Chelsea

- UEFA Champions League: 2020–21
- UEFA Super Cup: 2021
- FIFA Club World Cup: 2021
- EFL Cup runner-up: 2021–22

Porto

- Primeira Liga: 2025–26

Brazil U23

- Olympics Bronze Medal: 2008
- Olympics Silver Medal: 2012

Brazil

- Copa América: 2019; runner-up: 2021
- FIFA Confederations Cup: 2013

Individual

- Bola de Prata: 2007
- Campeonato Brasileiro Série A Best Fan's Player: 2008
- Campeonato Brasileiro Série A Team of the Year: 2008
- CONMEBOL South American Team of the Year: 2008
- Samba Gold: 2011, 2012, 2013
- Serie A Team of the Year: 2010–11, 2011–12
- UNFP Ligue 1 Team of the Year: 2012–13, 2013–14, 2014–15, 2015–16, 2016–17, 2017–18, 2018–19
- UNFP Ligue 1 Player of the Month: March 2013, October 2019
- UEFA Team of the Year: 2011, 2012, 2013
- UEFA Champions League Team of the Group Stage: 2015
- FIFPRO World 11: 2013, 2014, 2015
- FIFA Confederations Cup Dream Team: 2013
- FIFA Confederations Cup Castrol Index Top XI: 2013
- FIFA World Cup All-Star Team: 2014, 2018
- FIFA World Cup Dream Team: 2014, 2018
- UEFA Champions League Squad of the Season: 2015–16
- Copa América Team of the Tournament: 2019
- IFFHS CONMEBOL Team of the Decade: 2011–2020
- FIFA Club World Cup Golden Ball: 2021
- IFFHS CONMEBOL Team of the Year: 2020, 2022
- Chelsea Player of the Season: 2022–23
- Chelsea Players' Player of the Season: 2022–23

== See also ==
- List of men's footballers with 1,000 or more official appearances
- List of men's footballers with 100 or more international caps
