= Carlinhos (footballer, born 1983) =

Brazilian footballer

Personal information
- Full name: Carlos Henrique Carneiro Marinho
- Date of birth: 23 June 1983 (age 43)
- Place of birth: Maceió, Brazil
- Height: 1.82 m (6 ft 0 in)
- Position: Right-back

Youth career
- 2001–2002: Vitória

Senior career*
Years	Team	Apps	(Gls)
2003–2004	Vitória	11	(0)
2005–2006	Avaí (Loan)		
2007–2009	Villa Rio	0	(0)
2007–2008	→ Fluminense (Loan)	30	(1)
2009	→ Náutico (loan)		
2010	Juventude		
2011	Americana		
- * Club domestic league appearances and goals

Carlos Henrique Carneiro Marinho or simply Carlinhos (born 23 June 1983), is a Brazilian former professional footballer who played as a right-back.

== Career ==
Carlinhos was signed by Villa Rio in January 2007 on a four-year deal. He was immediately loaned to Fluminense for two years. Since January 2009 he plays for Náutico and turned back to Villa Rio on 27 April 2009.

== Honours ==
Vitória

- Bahia State League: 2003, 2004

Fluminense

- Brazilian Cup: 2007
