= Tartá =

Brazilian footballer

Personal information
- Full name: Vinícius Silva Soares
- Date of birth: April 13, 1989 (age 37)
- Place of birth: Rio de Janeiro, Brazil
- Height: 1.71 m (5 ft 7 in)
- Position: Midfielder

Senior career*
Years	Team	Apps	(Gls)
2007–2013	Fluminense	46	(6)
2010	→ Atlético Paranaense (loan)	4	(0)
2011	→ Kashima Antlers (loan)	7	(0)
2012	→ Vitória (loan)	33	(3)
2013	→ Criciúma (loan)	4	(0)
2013	→ Goiás (loan)	15	(0)
2014	Joinville	8	(0)
2014–2015	Ulsan Hyundai	35	(3)
2016	Bragantino	15	(0)
2017	BEC Tero Sasana	9	(0)
2017–2018	Boavista	8	(1)
2018	Brasiliense	7	(1)
2018–2019	Foolad	9	(0)

International career
2007	Brazil U-17	3	(2)
- * Club domestic league appearances and goals as of 19 July 2018

Vinícius Silva Soares, usually known simply as Tartá (Rio de Janeiro, April 13, 1989) is a Brazilian footballer.

== Career statistics ==
As of match played 27 June 2015

Appearances and goals by club, season and competition
Club	Season	League			State League		Cup		League Cup		Continental		Total	
Club	Season	Division	Apps	Goals	Apps	Goals	Apps	Goals	Apps	Goals	Apps	Goals	Apps	Goals
Fluminense	2008	Série A	27	4	0	0	0	0	—		—		27	4
Fluminense	2009	Série A	12	0	0	0	0	0	—		—		12	0
Fluminense	2010	Série A	6	2	0	0	0	0	—		—		6	2
Fluminense	2011	Série A	1	0	8	0	0	0	—		3	0	12	0
Fluminense	Total		46	6	8	0	0	0	—		3	0	57	6
Atlético Paranaense (loan)	2010	Série A	4	0	0	0	4	0	—		—		8	0
Kashima Antlers (loan)	2011	J.League Division 1	7	0	—		2	0	2	0	—		11	0
Vitória (loan)	2012	Série B	33	3	6	0	5	1	—		—		44	4
Criciúma (loan)	2013	Série A	4	0	14	1	3	0	—		—		21	1
Goiás (loan)	2013	Série A	15	0	0	0	0	0	—		—		15	0
Joinville	2014	Série B	8	0	15	0	1	0	—		—		24	0
Ulsan Hyundai	2014	K League Classic	20	3	—		0	0	—		—		20	3
Ulsan Hyundai	2015	K League Classic	15	0	—		1	0	—		—		16	0
Ulsan Hyundai	Total		35	3	—		1	0	—		—		36	3
Career Total			152	12	43	1	16	1	2	0	3	0	216	14
