= Romeu (footballer) =

Brazilian footballer

Personal information
- Full name: Romeu Pereira dos Santos
- Date of birth: 13 February 1985 (age 41)
- Place of birth: Bahia, Brazil
- Height: 1.79 m (5 ft 10 in)
- Position: Defensive midfielder

Youth career
- 2002–2004: Democrata

Senior career*
Years	Team	Apps	(Gls)
2005–2009	Fluminense	92	(5)
2009–2012	AEL	48	(7)
2012–2013	Levadiakos	19	(0)
2013–2015	Panthrakikos	46	(4)
2015–2016	Levadiakos	8	(0)
- * Club domestic league appearances and goals

Romeu Pereira dos Santos (born 13 February 1985), known as Romeu, is a Brazilian former professional footballer who played as a defensive midfielder.

== Career statistics ==
(correct as of 1 October 2013)

Season	Club	League	Apps	Goals
2005	Fluminense FC	Série A	11	0
2006	Fluminense FC	Série A	30	2
2007	Fluminense FC	Série A	27	0
2008	Fluminense FC	Série A	23	3
2009	Fluminense FC	Série A	1	0
2009–2010	AEL	Super League	26	4
2010–2011	AEL	Super League	22	3
2011–2012	AEL	Football League	0	0
2012–2013	Levadiakos	Super League	19	0
2013-2014	Panthrakikos	Super League	28	4
2014-2015	Panthrakikos	Super League	18	0
2015–2016	Levadiakos	Super League	8	0

== Honours ==
Fluminense

- Copa do Brasil: 2007
