= Fernando Souza =

Brazilian footballer (born 1987)

Personal information
- Full name: Fernando de Souza Nascimento
- Date of birth: April 19, 1987 (age 39)
- Place of birth: Piabetá-RJ, Brazil
- Height: 1.83 m (6 ft 0 in)
- Position: Central defender

Youth career
- –2004: Fluminense

Senior career*
Years	Team	Apps	(Gls)
2005–2007	Fluminense	2	(0)
2008	Sergipe		
2009–2011	Porto Alegre Futebol Clube		
2012–2014	Club Aurora	24	(2)
- * Club domestic league appearances and goals

Fernando de Souza Nascimento or simply Fernando Souza (born April 19, 1987), is a Brazilian former professional footballer who played as a central defender.
