= Gomes =

Gomes is a common Portuguese and Old Galician surname.

Notable people with the surname include:

== A ==
- Al Gomes (born 1960), American music producer, music industry strategist, and songwriter
- Albert Gomes (1911–1978), Trinidad and Tobago politician, labour leader and author
- Albino Gomes (born 1994), Indian footballer
- Aline Gomes (born 2005), Brazilian footballer
- Ana Gomes (born 1954), Portuguese politician
- André Gomes (born 1993), Portuguese footballer
- Angel Gomes (born 2000), English footballer
- Antônio Carlos Gomes (1836–1896), Brazilian composer
- António Gomes (born 2000), Portuguese soccer player
- António Gomes Leal (1848–1921), Portuguese poet
- Anthony Gomes (born 1970), Canadian musician
- Arthur Gomes (footballer) (born 1998), Brazilian footballer
- Arthur Gomes (rugby union) (born 1969), Portuguese-born French rugby union player

== B ==
- Bruno Gomes (footballer, born 1996), Brazilian footballer
- Bruno Gomes (footballer, born 2001), Brazilian footballer

== C ==
- Carlos Gomes (disambiguation)
- Chandima Gomes (born 1966), Sri Lankan Sinhala Malaysian engineer, physicist and writer
- Chico (footballer, born 1988), full name Francisco Miguel Franco Antunes Gomes, Portuguese footballer
- Chiquinho Baiano (born 1980), full name Francisco Gomes de Andrade Junior (born 1980), Brazilian footballer.
- Ciro Gomes (born 1957), Brazilian politician, lawyer and academic

== D ==
- Denise Gomes (born 1999), Brazilian mixed martial artist
- Diogo Gomes (c. 1420–1500), Portuguese navigator and explorer
- Douglas Gomes (born 1990), Brazilian politician

== E ==
- Ed Gomes (1936–2020), American politician
- Eduardo Gomes (1896–1981), Brazilian soldier and politician
- Édson Gomes Bonifácio, known as Gomes (footballer, born 1956), Brazilian footballer
- Egas Gomes de Sousa (1035–?), Portuguese noble, lord of the house of Felgueiras and Sousa
- Érica Gomes (born 1994), Portuguese Paralympic athlete
- Érica Gomes (footballer) (born 1997), Brazilian footballer
- Estêvão Gomes (c. 1483–1538), Portuguese explorer

== F ==
- Fernão Gomes, 15th century Portuguese explorer and merchant
- Fernando Gomes (disambiguation)
- Francis Anthony Gomes (1931–2011), Bangladeshi Roman Catholic bishop
- Francisco Gomes (disambiguation)

== H ==
- Harold Gomes (born 1933), American boxer
- Heurelho Gomes (born 1981), Brazilian footballer

== I ==
- Ida Gomes (1923–2009), Polish-born Brazilian actress

== J ==
- Jessica Gomes (born 1984), Australian model
- João Gomes (disambiguation)
- John Gomes (disambiguation)
- Jonny Gomes (born 1980), American baseball coach and former Major League Baseball player
- Jorge Gomes (footballer) (born 1954), Brazilian football striker
- Jorge Gomes (politician) (born 1951), Portuguese politician and businessman
- José Alencar Gomes da Silva (1931–2011), Brazilian politician
- Júlio César Gomes Moreira (born 1972), Brazilian Roman Catholic bishop

== K ==
- Keven Gomes (born 1995), Cape Verdean basketball player
- Kevin Gomes (born 1998), Indonesian footballer

== L ==
- Larry Gomes (born 1953), Trinidad and Tobago and West Indian former cricketer
- Luiz Flávio Gomes (1957–2020), Brazilian jurist and politician

== M ==
- Manoel Gomes (born 1969), Brazilian singer and composer
- Manuel Gomes (disambiguation)
- Manuel Gómez (disambiguation)
- Marcelo Gomes (dancer) (born 1979), Brazilian ballet dancer
- Marcelo Gomes (director) (born 1963), Brazilian film director
- Marcelo Gomes (footballer) (born 1981), Brazilian footballer
- Marlon Gomes (born 2003), Brazilian footballer
- Mauricio Gomes (born 1955), practitioner of Jiu-Jitsu
- Miguel Gomes (director) (born 1972), Portuguese film director
- Miguel Gomes (fencer) (born 1972), Portuguese fencer
- Miguel Gomes (racing driver), Portuguese stock car racing driver

=== N ===
- Nácia Gomes (1925–2011), Cape Verdean singer
- Nádia Gomes (born 1996), Portuguese footballer
- Nito Gomes (born 2002), Bissau-Guinean footballer
- Nuno Gomes (born 1976), Portuguese footballer
- Nuno Gomes (diver) (20th/21st century), Portuguese-born South African scuba diver

== P ==
- Paulo Victor Gomes (born 1988), Brazilian football coach
- Peter J. Gomes (1942–2011), American clergyman
- Pedro Gomes (triathlete) (born 1983), Portuguese triathlete

== R ==
- Ralph Gomes (1937–2020), Guyanese middle distance runner
- Ronaldinho Gomes (born 1979), Santomean footballer
- Rowan Gomes (1962–2023), Antiguan basketball player
- Ryan Gomes (born 1982), American basketball player

== S ==
- Soeiro Pereira Gomes (1909–1949), Portuguese writer
- Steve Anthony (born 1959 as Stephen Anthony Gomes), Canadian broadcaster
- Sumana Gomes (born 1968), Sri Lankan cinema actress

== T ==
- Toti Gomes (born 1999), footballer from Guinea-Bissau

== V ==
- Venceslau Brás Pereira Gomes (1868–1966), Brazilian politician and president of Brazil

== W ==
- Weasley Gomes de Olivera (born 1962), Brazilian footballer

== Y ==
- Yan Gomes (born 1987), Brazilian American baseball player

== See also ==
- Gómez, a common Spanish surname
- Gomez (disambiguation)
- Gomis, a variant spelling
