= Gómez =

Gómez (frequently anglicized as Gomez) is a common Spanish patronymic surname of Germanic origin meaning "son of Gome". The Portuguese and Old Galician version is Gomes, while the Catalan form is Gomis. The given name Gome is derived from the Visigothic word guma, "man", with multiple Germanic cognates with the same meaning (Old English guma, Middle English gome/gomo, High Old German gomo, Middle High German gome), which are related to Latin homo, "man".

== People ==
Notable people with the surname include:

=== A–E ===
- Alejandro "Papu" Gómez (born 1988), Argentine footballer
- Amaranta Gómez Regalado (born 1977), Mexican anthropologist
- Ana Sofía Gómez (born 1995), Guatemalan artistic gymnast
- Andrés Gómez (born 1960), Ecuadorian tennis player
- Arthur Gómez (born 1984), Gambian footballer
- Basil Gomez (born 1955), Anglo-American geomorphologist
- Beatrice Luigi Gomez (born 1995), Miss Universe Philippines 2021
- Begoña Gómez Martín (born 1964), Olympic judoka
- Bolívar Gómez (born 1977), Ecuadorian footballer
- Camilo Gómez (born 1984), Colombian road cyclist
- Camilo R. Gomez (born 1960), American physician
- Carlos Gómez (born 1985), Dominican baseball
- Chief Gómez (fl. 1840–1850), a Mescalero Apache chieftain
- Eleazar Gómez (born 1986) Mexican actor and model
- Emmanuel Gómez (born 1990), Gambian footballer

=== F–M ===
- Francis Gómez (born 1968), Venezuelan judoka
- Francisco Javier Gómez Noya, Spanish triathlete
- George Gomez (born 1955), Cuban-American industrial designer
- Gabriel Gomez (born 2006), Brazilian racing driver
- Haydee Gómez Cascante (1926–2024), Costa Rican obstetrician nurse and educator
- Homar Gomez, American politician
- Ignacio Gómez (born 1962), Colombian journalist
- Ignacio Gómez Aristizábal (1929–2026), Colombian Roman Catholic archbishop
- Isabella Gomez (born 1998), Colombian-American actress
- Jaime Luis Gomez, better known as Taboo, (born 1975), American rapper and actor
- Jaime P. Gomez, American film and television actor
- Jeronimo Gomez (born 1976), American musician
- Joe Gomez (born 1997), English footballer
- John Paul Gomez (born 1986): Filipino chess grandmaster
- Jordi Gómez (born 1985), Spanish footballer
- Jorge Gómez (born 1968), Chilean footballer
- José Dorángel Vargas Gómez (born 1957), Venezuelan serial killer and cannibal
- Joshua Gomez (born 1975), American actor
- Juan Gualberto Gómez (1854–1933), Cuban revolutionary leader
- Juan Vicente Gómez (1857–1935), ruler of Venezuela in 1908–35
- Laureano Gómez Colombian president 1950–1951
- Lefty Gomez (1908–1989), American baseball player
- Lloyd Gomez (1922–1953), American serial killer
- Luis Humberto Gómez Gallo (1962−2013), Colombian industrial engineer
- María Cristina Gómez (1938–1989), Salvadoran murder victim
- Mariano Gomez (1799–1872), Filipino priest and martyr
- Mario Gómez (born 1985), German footballer
- Mauro Gómez (born 1984), Dominican baseball player
- Máximo Gómez (1836–1905), Dominican soldier in the Cuban War of Independence
- Melissa Castrillón Gómez (born 1995), Colombian chess player
- Michelle Gomez (born 1966), Scottish actress
- Michelle Gómez (born 1992), Colombian pageant titleholder and model
- Miguel Gómez (born 1974), Colombian/American photographer

=== N–Z ===
- Pablo Gomez Sarino, Filipino politician
- Pat Gomez (born 1960), American artist
- Patricia Gómez (born 1971), Bolivian politician
- Patricio Gómez (born 1981), Argentine footballer
- Raúl Gómez González (born 1954), Mexican Roman Catholic archbishop
- Rebecca Marie Gomez, better known as Becky G, (born 1997), American singer and actress
- Richard Gomez (born 1966), Filipino actor and politician
- Rick Gomez (born 1972), American actor
- Roberto Gómez Bolaños (1929–2014) Mexican screenwriter, actor and comedian
- Scott Gomez (born 1979), American hockey player
- Selena Gomez (born 1992), American singer, songwriter and actress
- Sofía Gómez (born 1992), Colombian freediver
- Sylvana Gómez, Guatemalan beach volleyball player
- Tamara Gómez Garrido (born 1991), Spanish triathlete
- Teodoro Gómez (1963–2026), Honduran Roman Catholic bishop
- Trifón Gómez (1889–1955), Spanish socialist politician
- Ulysses Gomez (born 1983),
- Victoriano Gómez Urrutia (1943–1971), Salvadoran murderer, last person to be executed by El Salvador
- Xochitl Gomez (born 2006), American actress
- Yoendrys Gómez (born 1999), Venezuelan baseball player
- Yolanda Gómez (1962–2012), Mexican astronomer
- Yorman Gómez (born 2002), Venezuelan baseball player
- Zoraida Gómez (born 1985), Mexican actress, singer and model

== Fictional ==
- Felipe Gómez, a character on the American television sitcom Three's Company

== See also ==
- Francisco Gómez (disambiguation)
- Gomez (band), British indie rock band
- Gomez Addams, patriarch of the fictional Addams Family
