= Gomis =

Gomis (Catalan: [ˈɡomis], spelling variant: Gomiz) is a Catalan surname, equivalent to Gomes in Portuguese and Galician, and Gómez in Spanish. It is also a Senegalese and Bissau Guinean surname, borrowed from Portuguese, sharing the same spelling (French: [ɡɔmis]).

Gomis may refer to:

- Adelaida Ferré Gomis (1881–1955), Catalan lace-maker
- Adon Gomis (born 1992), French footballer of Senegalese and Bissau-Guinea descent
- Alain Gomis (born 1972), French-Senegalese film director and screenwriter
- Alfred Gomis (born 1993), Senegalese–Italian footballer, brother of Lys and Maurice
- Alphonse Gomis (born 1965), Senegalese alpine skier
- Anna Gomis (born 1973), French wrestler
- Antoine Gomis (born 1989), French basketball player
- Antonio Gomis (born 2003), Spanish footballer
- Bafétimbi Gomis (born 1985), French footballer of Senegalese descent
- Bedsenté Gomis (born 1988), semi-professional French footballer
- Charles Gomis (1941–2021), Ivorian politician and diplomat
- Christian Gomis (born 1998), Senegalese footballer
- Christine Gomis (born 1968), French basketball player
- David Gomis (born 1992), French footballer of Senegalese and Bissau-Guinea descent
- Donatien Gomis (born 1994), Senegalese footballer
- Émilie Gomis (born 1983), Senegalese-French basketball player
- Grégory Gomis (born 1990), French footballer
- Héctor Suárez Gomís (born 1968), Mexican actor and singer
- Honore Gomis (born 1996), Senegalese footballer
- Iron Gomis (born 1999), French footballer
- Joaquín Gomis Cornet (1869–1957), Spanish entrepreneur and politician
- Joaquim Gomis (1902–1991), Spanish photographer, collector and entrepreneur
- Johanne Gomis (born 1985), French basketball player
- José Melchor Gomis (1791–1836), Spanish composer
- Joseph Gomis (born 1978), French basketball player
- Julie Gomis (born 1952), Senegalese hurdler
- Kafétien Gomis (born 1980), French long jumper
- Kévin Gomis (born 1989), French footballer
- Louis Gomis, multiple people
- Lys Gomis (born 1989), Italian footballer of Senegalese and Bissau-Guinea descent, brother of Alfred and Maurice
- Marcel Gomis (born 1987), Senegalese footballer
- Maurice Gomis (born 1997), Italian footballer of Senegalese and Bissau-Guinea descent, brother of Alfred and Lys
- Morgaro Gomis (born 1985), Senegalese footballer
- Nicksoen Gomis (born 2002), French footballer
- Oswald Gomis (1932–2023), 10th Archbishop of Colombo
- Rémi Gomis (born 1984), French-Senegalese footballer
- Robert Gomis (born 1973), French karate competitor
- Roger Gomis (born 1994), Senegalese footballer
- Sandra Gomis (born 1983), French hurdler
- Tidiam Gomis (born 2006), French footballer
- Víctor Gomis (born 1982), Spanish footballer
- Virgil Gomis (born 1999), French footballer
- Yannick Gomis (born 1992), Senegalese footballer

== See also ==
- Gomes, equivalent Portuguese surname
- Gómez, equivalent Spanish surname
- Gomiz
