= Francisco Gomes =

Francisco Gomes is a Portuguese name which may refer to:

- Chico (footballer, born 1988), full name Francisco Miguel Franco Antunes Gomes, Portuguese footballer
- Chiquinho Baiano (born 1980), full name Francisco Gomes de Andrade Junior (born 1980), Brazilian footballer
- Francisco Gomes (governor) (1576-1656), governor of Santa Fe de Nuevo Mexico between 1641 and 1642
- Francisco Gomes da Rocha (1745–1808), Brazilian composer
- Francisco Gomes de Amorim (1827–1891), Portuguese poet and dramatist
- Francisco da Costa Gomes (1914–2001), Portuguese military officer and politician, the 15th President of the Portuguese Republic
- Francisco Dias Gomes (1745–1795), Portuguese poet and literary critic
- Francisco Luís Gomes (1829–1869), Portuguese physician, writer, historian, economist, politician
- Gomes da Costa (footballer) (born 1919), former Portuguese footballer
- Francisco Gomes (footballer) (born 2004), Portuguese footballer

== Other ==
- Dr Francisco Luis Gomes District Library, the major library in the district of South Goa, Goa, India

== See also ==
- Francisco (disambiguation)
- Gomes
- Francisco Gómez (disambiguation)
