= Ashanti Johnson =

American geochemist and chemical oceanographer

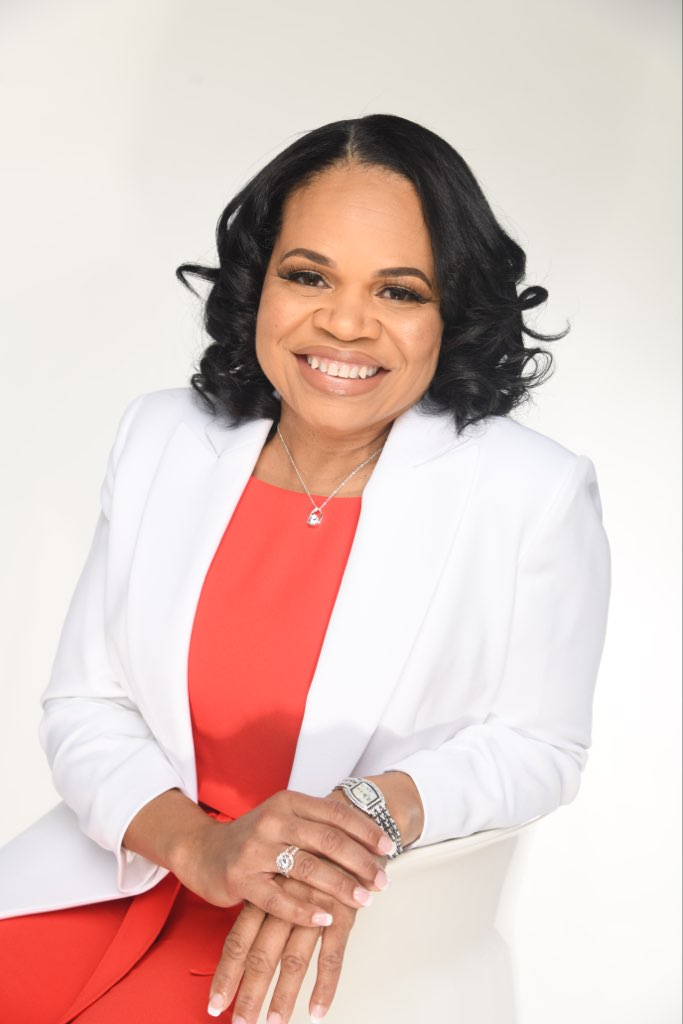
- Education: Texas A&M University
- Occupations: geochemist chemical oceanographer
- Employer: University of Texas at Arlington
- Known for: Aquatic radiochemistry
- Awards: 2010 Presidential Award for Excellence in Science Mathematics and Engineering Mentoring, AGU Ambassador Award (2016); John P. McGovern Award (2019)

Ashanti Johnson (previously Ashanti Johnson-Pyrtle) is an American geochemist and chemical oceanographer. She is the first African American to earn a doctoral degree in oceanography from Texas A&M University.

Johnson received the Presidential Award for Excellence in Science, Mathematics, and Engineering Mentoring in 2008.

Johnson served as an associate professor of history at Fort Valley State University, an associate professor of environmental science and assistant vice provost at the University of Texas at Arlington. She also held faculty positions at the Georgia Institute of Technology School of Earth and Atmospheric Sciences, the Savannah State University Marine Science Program, the University of South Florida College of Marine Science, and the Mercer University Department of Education. Currently, Johnson is a professional speaker on topics of diversity and inclusion in higher education, Youth STEM advocacy, and workplace equity.

== Education ==
Johnson received her B.S. in 1993 in marine science from Texas A&M University-Galveston, where she became the first African-American student body president. She received her Ph.D. in oceanography from Texas A&M University in 1999.

In her "Women Exploring Oceans" interview, Johnson said that she first became interested in the oceans as a third grade student by watching Jacques Cousteau. Her interest was strengthened in fifth grade when she spent a day discussing the oceans with a female marine biology graduate student.

== Career and research ==
Johnson's areas of research specialization include aquatic radiogeochemistry, professional development of students, and science and engineering diversity-focused initiatives. Her aquatic radiogeochemistry research activities focus on the utilization of various biogeochemical indicators to interpret past events that have impacted the marine, estuarine, and freshwater environments in the Arctic, as well as in coastal regions of Georgia, Florida, and Puerto Rico.

=== Diversity-focused initiatives in academia ===
Johnson served as executive director for a national non-profit organization entitled the Institute for Broadening Participation. She also served as the director of one of four NASA One Stop Shopping Initiative (OSSI) Broker-Facilitator Corps, as well as the director for the NASA and NSF-funded Minorities Striving and Pursuing Higher Degrees of Success in Earth System Science Initiative. She was also the PI of the NSF-funded Pathways to Ocean Science Project and Co-PI of the NSF-funded Pathways to Engineering Project. While an assistant professor at the University of South Florida, Johnson served as the PI and director of the NSF-funded Florida-Georgia Louis Stokes Alliance for Minority Participation USF Bridge to the Doctorate Program and the Alfred P. Sloan Foundation's Minority Ph.D. Program in the College of Marine Science. She also co-directed the NSF-funded USF College of Marine Science OCEANS Graduate STEM Fellows in K-12 Education (OCEANS GK-12) Fellowship Program and facilitated the establishment of the National Ocean Sciences Bowl's Spoonbill Bowl Regional Competition at USF College of Marine Science.

Johnson is a certified teacher in 8th-12th grade Earth and Space Sciences, K-12 Mild and Moderate Special Education, and K-12 Severe and Profound Special Education. She has taught K-12 students in public and private schools, including as a guest lecturer.

== Organizational involvement ==
Johnson served on the US Defense Science Board, a Federal Advisory Committee established to provide independent advice to the US Secretary of Defense. She has also represented the US Department of State at STEM events in Cambodia, Samoa, Fiji and the Cook Islands, where she spoke at US embassies, science and engineering festivals, conferences, universities and schools.

Johnson has served as vice president of The STEM Future Foundation, a nonprofit that provides technology resources and STEM education to children in under-resourced urban and rural communities. Johnson has also served on the NSF's Advisory Committee on Environmental Research and Education, the American Geophysical Union Committee on Education and Human Resources as well as their Subcommittee on Diversity, Association for the Sciences of Limnology and Oceanography Education Committee, International Safe Water Conference Steering Committee, Digital Library for Earth System Education Annual Planning Committee, Savannah River Environmental Sciences Field Station Advisory Board, University of Maine's ADVANCE Rising Tide Center Advisory Board, COSEE: Ocean Systems Advisory Board, Maine Physical Sciences Partnership Advisory Board, MentorNet Geosciences Advisory Board and the Howard University Science, Engineering, and Mathematics Program External Advisory Board. Her additional service activities include serving on the steering committee for the American Academy of Microbiology's "Training the Microbiologist of the Future Colloquium", the executive committee of "CHANGES - the Coalition of Hispanic, African and Native Americans for the Next Generation of Engineers and Scientists", and participating in the White House Workshop on STEM Minority Inclusion, as well as the White House Forum on Minorities in Energy. She was also Chief of Research and Science Practice for the Black Girls Dive Foundation, an organization that encourages girls from groups underrepresented in STEM to pursue careers in the aquatic sciences.

== Awards ==
Johnson received the 2019 John P. McGovern Science and Society Award from Sigma Xi, the Scientific Research Honor Society. In 2016 she received the American Geophysical Union (AGU) Excellence in Geophysical Education Award and an AGU Ambassador Award, and was named an AGU Fellow. In January 2010 she received a Presidential Award for Excellence in Science, Mathematics and Engineering Mentoring (PAESMEM) at the White House in recognition of her professional development and diversity-related activities.

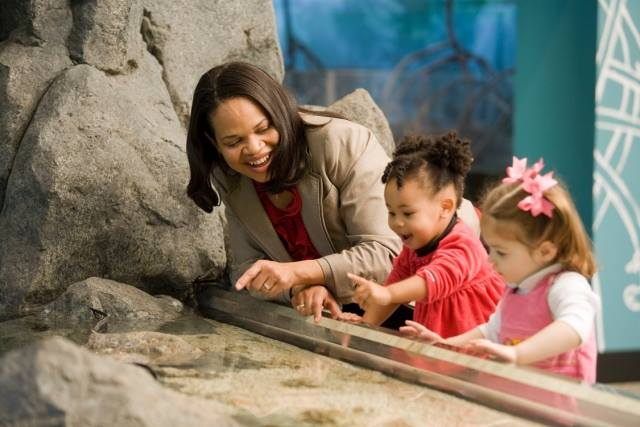
Johnson photographed in 2011
