= Haydee Gómez Cascante =

Costa Rican obstetrician nurse and educator (1926–1947)

Haydee Gómez Cascante (6 July 1926 – 12 January 2024) was a Costa Rican obstetrician nurse and educator who worked in the Ministry of Public Health for 37 years. While there, she consulted for the World Health Organization, and became the regional field director for the International Confederation of Obstetricians. For several years she was an external professor of the maternal-child program at the School of Nursing at the University of Costa Rica. She was also the director of the Nursing School of Costa Rica. Throughout her career, she advocated for the availability of family planning options to improve the quality of life of women and their families and she was inducted into the country's Gallery of Women for her public health work.

== Biography ==
Gómez was born in San José on 6 July 1926. She graduated at 19 from the School of Nursing of the College of Physicians and Surgeons of Costa Rica on 17 December 1947 having specialized in obstetrics, thus qualifying as both an obstetrician and nurse. In 1952, she attended classes at the School of Medicine, Syracuse University, for post-basic studies in Public Health completing her studies there in 1953.

=== Career ===
Gomez worked from 1947 to 1948 with Dr. Carlos Sáenz Herrera, assisting in his private practice. The following year, she worked at the Hospital of the Compañía Bananera de Costa Rica in Quepos while also working in the operating room of the Hospital Calderón Guardia.

Beginning in 1950, she found her life's work as a public health employee of the country's Ministry of Public Health, and she remained there for the next 37 years until she retired in July 1987. While working in that capacity her responsibilities included assuming positions that included supervisor, administrator, educator, researcher and consultant in maternal and child health.

Because of her expertise, she became involved with the work of many national and international organizations including: Ninth Conference of the Pan American Health Organization (Guatemala), Traveling Seminar to Observe Maternal and Child Care Programs (United States and Puerto Rico), International Conference on Midwifery Training and Practice (Italy), International Course on Family Planning (Colombia), International Congress of Obstetricians (United States), the International Congress of Obstetricians (Switzerland) and the World Health Organization (Switzerland).

As an educator, she helped organize the postgraduate course in obstetrics, and she became a director of the Nursing School of Costa Rica. Gómez was known for promoting the standards of care of mothers and children and improving the care for women who were pregnant. A political advocate, she actively promoted the right of women to family planning practices as a means to improve the quality of life of women and their families.

Gómez was president of the College of Nurses from 1967 to 1969 as well as the national coordinator of the Traditional Midwives Program to educate community leaders and establish standards for obstetric work to reduce maternal and infant mortality. She was an author or co-author of public health research that included, Evaluation of the training courses of the empirical midwives of Costa Rica, Procedures and activities carried out by obstetric nurses in the labor and delivery rooms, The implications of the General Health Law for the education and practice of nursing in Costa Rica, Guidelines for the practice and teaching of Nursing in Costa Rica: Situation of women's health in Costa Rica, and Evaluation of the Decade of Women.

She died on 12 January 2024 at 97.

=== Distinctions ===
- 1966: received the Meritorious Medal of Honor from the Association of Midwives of Uruguay in recognition of her work as a consultant
- 1980s: received the Dedication of the First Congress of the Association of Professionals in Nursing
- 2002: received the Estelia Marín Murillo Award from the College of Nurses to outstanding professionals who have contributed to the development of nursing in the country
- 2002: included in Women's Gallery of the National Women's Institute of Costa Rica
- 2014: received the Ministry of Health's Tribute to Health Nurses
- 2017: awarded a medal by the School of Nursing of the University of Costa Rica on the celebration of the centenary of its foundation

=== Memberships ===
- Association of Retired Nurses
- Electoral Tribunal of the College of Nurses
- Center Association of Family Orientation
- Health Board of the Women's Hospital (2004)
