= João Gomes =

João Gomes may refer to:

== Sports ==
=== Association football (soccer) ===
- César Pereira (João César Gomes Pereira, born 1975), Portuguese football goalkeeper
- João Paulo Gomes da Costa (born 1986), Brazilian football left back
- João Diogo (footballer, born 1988) (João Diogo Gomes de Freitas, born 1988), Portuguese football player
- João Amorim (footballer, born July 1992) (João Filipe Amorim Gomes, born 1992), Portuguese football player
- João Pedro Gomes Camacho (born 1994), Portuguese football player
- João Gomes (footballer, born 1996), Portuguese football defender
- João Gomes (footballer, born 2001), Brazilian football midfielder

=== Other sports ===
- João Gomes (fencer) (born 1975) Portuguese fencer
- João Santos (basketball) (João Pedro Gomes Santos, born 1979), Portuguese basketball player
- João Gomes (basketball) (born 1985), Portuguese basketball player, a.k.a. Betinho
- João Gomes Júnior (born 1986), Brazilian swimmer

== Others ==
- João Florêncio Gomes (1886–1919), Brazilian herpetologist
- João Cravinho (João Cardona Gomes Cravinho), born 1936), Portuguese politician
- João Gomes (singer) (born 2002), Brazilian singer

== Other uses ==
- João Gomes Bridge, bridge on the island of Madeira
