= Manuel Gómez =

Manuel Gómez may refer to:

- Manuel Gómez Morín (1897–1972), Mexican politician; founder of the National Action Party (PAN)
- Manuel Gómez Pedraza (1789–1851), Mexican politician; former president of Mexico
- Manuel Gómez Pereira (born 1958), Spanish screenwriter and film director
- Manuel Gómez Rodríguez (born 1940), Puerto Rican theoretical physicist
- Manuel José Gómez Rufino (1820–1882), Argentine politician; governor of San Juan
- Manuel Octavio Gómez (1934–1988), Cuban film director
- Manuel Z. Gómez (1813–1871), Mexican politician and former governor of Nuevo León
- Manuel Gomez (clarinettist) (1859–1922), Spanish clarinettist and founding member of the London Symphony Orchestra
- Manuel Gómez Mora (born 1990), Mexican footballer

== See also ==
- Manuel Gómez-Moreno Martínez (1870–1970), Spanish archaeologist
- Manuel Gomes (disambiguation)
