= Manuel Gómez Rodríguez =

Puerto Rican physicist

Prof. Manuel Gómez Rodríguez
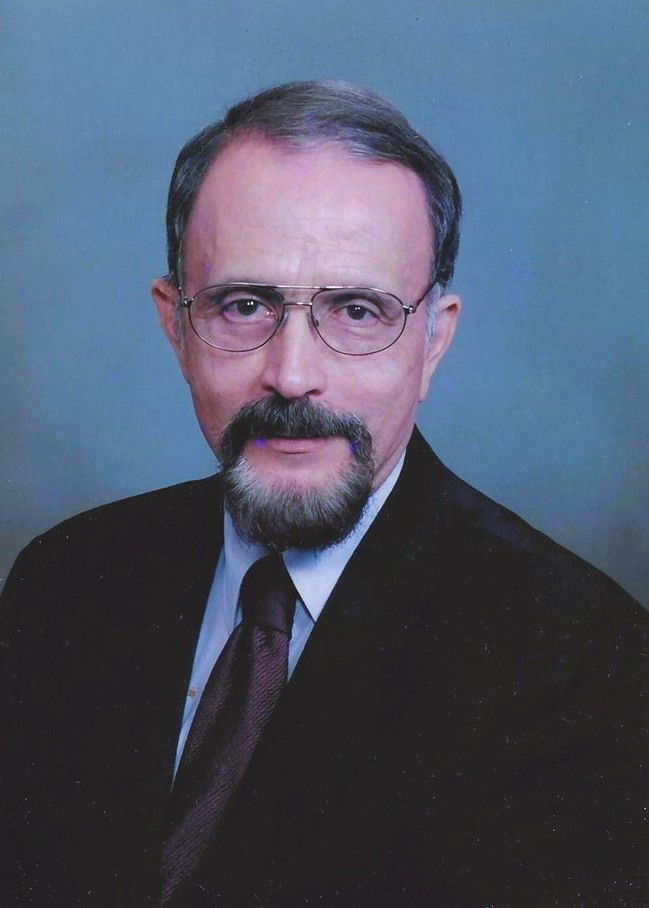
- Born: October 1940 (age 85); Ponce, Puerto Rico
- Education: Cornell University (Ph.D., Theoretical Physics, 1967)
- Known for: Founding Director of RCSE, Education and Research Reform in Puerto Rico
- Scientific career
- Fields: Theoretical Physics, Research Infrastructure Development, Science and Technology Policy, Education Reform
- Workplaces: University of Puerto Rico System

Prof. Manuel Gómez Rodríguez is a Puerto Rican physicist and academic leader who served for decades at the University of Puerto Rico (UPR), where he was instrumental in strengthening research infrastructure and expanding graduate education in science and engineering. He is best known as the founding director of the Resource Center for Science and Engineering (RCSE) at UPR and for his decades-long leadership in transforming the UPR system into a research-oriented university.

== Biography ==
Prof. Manuel Gómez Rodríguez (born October 1940) is a Puerto Rican theoretical physicist, academic reformer, and science policy leader. He is best known for founding the RCSE at the UPR and for guiding the university's transition into a modern research-focused institution. Over more than four decades at UPR, Gómez held major leadership roles including Dean of the College of Natural Sciences from 1974 to 1986, and Vice President for Research and Academic Affairs from 1997 to 2003.

According to the National Academies of Sciences, Engineering, and Medicine, Gómez served as Vice President for Research and Academic Affairs at UPR, where he led the implementation of an assessment plan that reformed undergraduate science, technology, engineering, and mathematics (STEM) education across the university’s multicampus system.

The same publication notes that earlier, in his career, he served as professor and chair of physics, dean of the College of Natural Sciences, and founding director of the RCSE. He also directed the Puerto Rico Experimental Program to Stimulate Competitive Research (EPSCoR) program beginning in 1986 and contributed to the island’s science and technology policy frameworks. His leadership in higher education and research development eventually led to his appointment to the White House Initiative on Educational Excellence for Hispanics.

According to The Chronicle of Higher Education, few academic or political leaders in Puerto Rico have reshaped the island’s educational system as profoundly as Dr. Gómez, who, as director of the RCSE, oversaw wide-ranging reforms after its establishment in 1980 to expand the university’s research capacity.

Dr. Gómez’s career combined research in theoretical physics with institution-building and education reform, earning recognition from the American Association for the Advancement of Science (AAAS), which named him a Fellow in 2006, and from the National Science Board for his role in systemic STEM education reform.

== Early life and education ==
Professor Gómez was born in Ponce, Puerto Rico, and raised in a multicultural household with a strong emphasis on learning and the arts. His paternal grandfather, was a self-taught architect whose works, including the López Residence., are listed on the National Register of Historic Places. His grandaunt, Carmen Gómez Tejera, was a pioneer in Puerto Rican education.

He studied physics and mathematics at UPR and earned a Ph.D. in theoretical physics from Cornell University in 1967. While at Cornell, he published in the journal Physical Review Letters and completed a postdoctoral fellowship at the Naval Research Laboratory in Washington, D.C.

== Academic career ==
Dr. Gómez began his academic career at UPR in 1969, joining the Department of Physics at the Mayagüez campus before transferring to the Río Piedras campus. He chaired the Department of Physics from 1974 to 1975 and that same year was appointed Dean of the College of Natural Sciences.

As dean, Dr. Gómez strengthened the university’s research capacity by expanding doctoral programs, increasing external funding, and promoting collaboration between UPR, government agencies, and private industry. In 1980 he established RCSE, a multi-campus institute created to support research development and interdisciplinary training in science and engineering.

Through the RCSE, Dr. Gómez coordinated large-scale programs supported by the National Science Foundation (NSF), including the Experimental Program to Stimulate Competitive Research (EPSCoR), the Louis Stokes Alliances for Minority Participation (LSAMP), and the Institutional Minority Graduate Education Program (IMGEP). These initiatives expanded graduate education opportunities and broadened participation in STEM fields across Puerto Rico.

He also played a leading role in education reform through the Puerto Rico Statewide Systemic Initiative in Science and Mathematics Education, a cooperative effort between UPR and the Puerto Rico Department of Education funded by the NSF.

In 1997, Dr. Gómez was appointed Vice President for Research and Academic Affairs of the UPR system, where he expanded doctoral offerings, created the Office of Institutional Research.

Dr. Gómez retired from teaching in 2013 after more than four decades of service to UPR, leaving a lasting influence on the island's scientific and academic infrastructure.

== Research infrastructure development and the Institute for Functional Nanomaterials ==
During his tenure as Vice President for Research and Technology at UPR, Dr. Manuel Gómez played a pivotal role in establishing the framework for multidisciplinary and multi-campus research institutes that transformed the island’s research and innovation ecosystem. One early effort was the Partnerships for Innovation (PFI) – From Ideation to Economic Development program (2001–2003), funded by the U.S. National Science Foundation (NSF) for US$1.0 million.

Building on this foundation, Dr. Gómez led the planning and launch of the Institute for Functional Nanomaterials (IFN) under the NSF EPSCoR RII Track‑1 Award #1002410 (2010–2015), which provided US$20 million in federal funding and US$4 million in matching support. The IFN united researchers across the UPR System and partner institutions to advance nanotechnology, condensed matter physics, energy materials, and nanoscale biomedical applications. Media coverage described the IFN as a major scientific milestone for Puerto Rico’s research capacity.

Earlier press reports had also highlighted Dr. Gómez’s leadership in securing major institutional investments toward biotechnology and nanoscience research centers designed to support Puerto Rico’s pharmaceutical and high‑technology industries.

== Legacy ==
Dr. Manuel Gómez's career at UPR spanned more than four decades, during which he played a central role in transforming the university’s research and graduate education landscape. His efforts were instrumental in securing major federal initiatives that advanced research infrastructure across the UPR System. Following Dr. Gómez’s retirement in 2013, UPR continued to expand its research and graduate education infrastructure, showing sustained levels of research activity, doctoral training, and national visibility in science and engineering education. This progress built upon the institutional foundations and research capacity that Dr. Gómez had established over several decades through initiatives such as the RCSE and the development of system-wide research institutes.

Under the institutional framework he helped to establish, UPR–Río Piedras and UPR–Mayagüez achieved national classification as “Research 2” (High Research Activity and Doctorate Production) universities, maintained robust levels of R&D expenditures, and increased the production of doctoral degrees in science and engineering fields.

== Recognitions ==
Prof. Gómez's recognitions include:

- Fellow of the American Association for the Advancement of Science (AAAS), 2006
- Recognition by the National Science Board for systemic science education reform (1998)
- Appointment by President Barack Obama in 2008 to the President's White House Initiative on Educational Excellence for Hispanics.

== Selected Publications ==
- M Gomez, SP Bowen, Physical properties of an off-center impurity in the tunneling approximation, I. Statics, JA Krumhansl, Physical Review, 1967•APS
- M. Gómez, Theory for the Interaction of Phonons with Nonharmonic Impurities and Their Effect on the Polarizability, Phys. Rev. 2B, 4262 (1970).
- M. Gómez, et al. Corrections to the Optical Properties of Cermets. I. Quantum Size Effects. Ferroelectric Letters, (5 EMF Conference) Vol. 54, 223-226 (1983).
- M. Gómez, et al. Multiple Scattering Theories Including Correlation Effects to Obtain the Effective Dielectric Constant of Non-Homogeneous Thin Films. Phys. Rev. B, Vol. 32, No. 6, 3429-3441 (1985).
- M. Gómez, L. Fonseca, and L. Cruz. T-Matrix Approach for the Calculation of Local Fields in a Neighborhood of Small Clusters in the Electrodynamic Regime. The Physical Review, B40, 7491 (1989).
- L. Fonseca, L. Cruz, M. Gómez, and J.A. Gonzalo. Determination of Sizes of Potassium Colloids in KCL:O2 Using Light Scattering Techniques. App. Phys. Comm., Vol. 12, 153-162 (1993).
- L. Fonseca, L. Cruz, W. Vargas, and M. Gómez. Theoretical Calculation of the Optical Absorption of Fractal Colloidal Aggregates Using a Multiple Scattering Formalism. Condensed Matter Theories, Vol. 8, 561-571, Plenum Co. (1993).
- L.F. Fonseca, M. Gómez, and L. Cruz. Calculation of the Aggregation and Electrodynamic Effects in Granular Systems. Physica A: 123-130 (1994).
