= Caneta Azul =

Studio album by Manoel Gomes
- Released: August 2020
- Language: Portuguese
- Label: QÉS

Caneta Azul (lit. 'Blue Pen') is the debut album by Brazilian singer-songwriter Manoel Gomes, released in August 2020.

== Background ==
Manoel Gomes gained notoriety in the second half of 2019 with the song Caneta Azul, which he wrote himself. He wrote the song based on a personal experience of frequently losing his pens at school. The song went viral and was covered by several artists, including Wesley Safadão and Simone Mendes. Manoel only registered the song after its success.

After its immediate success, Manoel left his job as a security guard and began traveling around Brazil, performing in different states. At this time, the singer even stated that he intended to record his first album, with an entirely original repertoire of 14 tracks. Before its success, Manoel had already recorded another album, which was never widely released.

== Recording ==
The album was recorded at Studio Quem É Sabe in São Paulo, with musical production by percussionist Laércio da Costa. In an interview, Costa said the idea was to bring a bachata version of Caneta Azul, with a "more Gusttavo Lima" feel. While not limited to brega, the producer stated that Manoel Gomes' style is closer to that of singer Amado Batista.

At the time, Laércio also spoke about the singer's performance in the studio:

"It's in tune. Impressive. He has rhythm issues, which I, as a producer, have to understand. I follow him; I can't take away his originality. But he's good. Everything I ask, he does perfectly, in that half-crying way. He sings half-crying."

== Release ==
Caneta Azul was released on August 21, 2020, by the independent label QÉS Music. The repertoire included songs such as Ela É Muito É Vagabunda, Me Mande uma Carta, and Parabéns. Two songs from the project received music videos. The first, Eu Vou Deixar de Ser Besta, was released in 2020, and received over 100,000 views in less than a week. Maura was the second song to receive an audiovisual version, released on December 31, 2022, and received over 700,000 views in about a week.

In 2022, the album was re-released on digital platforms under the Manoel Gomes Music label. This edition is distinguished by the absence of producer Laércio da Costa's logo on the cover.

== Songs ==
All songs composed by Manoel Gomes:

- "Parabéns"
- "Maura"
- "Me Estremeci Foi Todo"
- "Ela Não Deixa"
- "Caneta Azul"
- "Passarinho"
- "Eu Vou Pra São Luís"
- "Ela Perdeu a Cabeça"
- "Ai Ai Ai"
- "Aniversário"
- "Garimpo"
- "Me Mande Uma Carta"
- "Eu Vou Deixar de Ser Besta"
- "Hospital"
- "Ela É Muito Vagabunda"
- "Por Onde Que Você Passa"
- "Não Me Despreze"
- "Caneta Azul (Axé)"

== Technical sheet ==
The following are the musicians and technicians involved in the production of Caneta Azul:

- Manoel Gomes – vocals
- Laércio da Costa – music production, arrangements, programming, percussion
- Cleriston Alves – keyboards, arrangements, programming
- Jordão Mota (Bolinha) – accordion
- Claudio Picinin – guitar, editing, mixing, and mastering
