= Manuel Gomes =

Manuel Gomes may refer to:

- Manuel Teixeira Gomes (1860–1941), Portuguese politician and writer, President of Portugal
- Manuel Gomes (boxer) (born 1966), Angolan Olympic boxer
- Manuel Gomes (football coach) (born 1951), Portuguese football manager
- Manuel António Gomes (1868–1933), Portuguese physicist
- Manuel Pedro Gomes (born 1941), former Portuguese footballer
- Manel Kape (born 1993), born Manuel Pedro Gomes, Angolan mixed martial artist

== See also ==
- Manuel Gómez (disambiguation)
- Manoel Gomes, Brazilian singer and composer
