= Francisco Dias Gomes =

Francisco Dias Gomes (1745 – 30 September 1795) was a Portuguese poet and literary critic.

== Biography ==
Francisco Dias Gomes was born in Lisbon, the son of Fructuoso Dias, a local tradesman, and his wife Vivência Gomes. His work was little known to contemporary men of letters and his career was spent primarily writing poetry in elegiac meter and studying the progress of Portugal's language and literature.

He died of an epidemic fever in 1795.

== Works ==
- Analise e Combinações Filosóficas sobre a Elocução e Estilo de Sá de Miranda, Ferreira, Bernardes, Caminha, e Camões (1792).
- Ifigenia: Tragédia Tirada da História Grega (1798).
- Obras Poeticas de Francisco Dias Gomes (1799).
- Electra (1799).
- Elegia à Morte de hum Homem Honrado e Virtuoso (1799).
