= John Gomes =

John Gomes or Gomez may refer to:

- John Gomes (businessman) (fl. 2000s–2020s), American real estate broker
- John Gomes (general) (fl. 1980s–2010s), Bangladesh Army officer and diplomat
- John Jairo Gomez (born 1975), Colombian-American prelate of the Roman Catholic Church
- John Gomez (fl. 2000s–2020s), American musician, guitarist in The Summer Set
