= College of Physicians and Surgeons of Costa Rica =

Costa Rican professional body

- Colegio de Médicos y Cirujanos de Costa Rica
- Headquarters: Sabana Sur, San José de Costa Rica
- Website: https://medicos.cr
- Formerly called: Facultad de Medicina, Cirugía y Farmacia de Costa Rica (1895–1940)

The College of Physicians and Surgeons of Costa Rica is a professional body responsible for the audit of medicine and surgery in the Republic of Costa Rica. All doctors in the country must be affiliated with it in order to practice the profession legally in Costa Rica. In addition, technicians in different medical fields are incorporated into the institution.

Their offices are located in Sabana Sur, San José de Costa Rica. As of 2025, Elliott Garita Jiménez is the chair of the governing committee.

== Views ==
The college holds the view that under Costa Rica's laws, any physician or surgeon is allowed to perform liposuction and other aesthetic procedures.

They support vaccination against influenza for healthcare workers and their families. They have opposed anti-vaccination physicians.
