= Pat Gomez (artist) =

Chicana visual artist

Patricia "Pat" Gomez (born 1960) is a Chicana visual artist based in Los Angeles best known for incorporating text within her art. She is currently the Civic Art Project Manager at Los Angeles County Department of Arts and Culture.

== Biography ==
Pat Gomez earned Bachelor's and Master's degrees in visual arts at California State University, Fullerton. Gomez worked with Self Help Graphics, a community nonprofit arts organization in East Los Angeles with roots in the Chicano Movement.

During her tenure as the City of Los Angeles Murals Manager, Gomez spearheaded significant restoration efforts for murals by several iconic muralists, including David Botello, Kent Twitchell and Wayne Healy, a co-founder of East Los Streetscapers.

Gomez also managed conservation of the 1984 Olympic Freeway Murals.

== Art ==
Several works by Gomez have been acquired by museums and cultural institutions. Her prints are included in the permanent collections of the Los Angeles County Museum of Art (LACMA) and the Jack and Shanaz Langson Institute and Museum of California Art (Langson IMCA) at the University of California- Irvine. Langson IMCA’s holdings currently include over 4,500 works representing a wide array of genres and mediums that span late 19th century California Impressionism and plein air painting to Post-War and contemporary art.

=== War Stories ===
In 1991, Gomez created her first silkscreen print at Self Help Graphics titled War Stories. In this print, Gomez included printed personal accounts of her uncle and her cousin's respective experiences in the Vietnam War and the Gulf War. War Stories was specifically created in response to the first Gulf War and was Gomez's attempts at “tearing off the fabric of a million people’s stories”. Within the text, Gomez explains how her uncle could not pursue college or a white collar career because of social and economic reasons and he eventually joined his local gang. Upon being caught and tried for a crime, Gomez's uncle was given a choice of either being imprisoned or joining the war effort in Vietnam. Six months after enlisting in the army, her uncle was killed in action. The second story inscribed in War Stories is a story about Gomez's cousin who grew up in a similar environment as her uncle and how he aspired to be the first one in his family to go to college and the only way he could financially accomplish this was through enlisting in the army.

=== The Trappings of Sor Juana ===
Created as part of an art gallery exhibition about Juana Inés de la Cruz in 1999, The Trappings of Sor Juana was meant to reflect the story of the nun's life. Sor Juana was a writer in colonial Mexico that was eventually silenced and unable to publish her work because she was critical of patriarchy, the church and the political establishment. Included in this piece is text from an excerpt from Sor Juana's poem, Disillusionment.

=== Stay Tuned ===
Pat Gomez created the 1992 art piece Stay Tuned as a response to her experience in the 1992 Los Angeles Riots. In her art piece, Gomez displays rows of televisions providing a glimpse into the destruction she witnessed during the riots. On the right side of the art piece, a personal account of the riots are written from Pat Gomez's perspective.
