= Víctor Gomis =

Spanish footballer (born 1982)

Personal information
- Full name: Víctor Manuel Gomis Pastor
- Date of birth: 1 November 1982 (age 44)
- Place of birth: Crevillent, Spain
- Height: 1.81 m (5 ft 11 1/2 in)
- Position: Left back

Youth career
- 1995–2000: Elche

Senior career*
Years	Team	Apps	(Gls)
2000–2003	Elche B		
2003–2008	Elche	45	(1)
2003–2004	→ Villajoyosa (loan)	26	(0)
2004–2005	→ Rayo Vallecano (loan)	18	(2)
2008–2009	Poli Ejido	24	(1)
2009	Crevillente	18	(4)
2009–2010	Zamora	20	(1)
2010–2011	Castellón	21	(0)
2011–2012	Dénia	32	(0)
2012–2015	Huracán	87	(0)
2016	Orihuela	15	(0)
2016–2024	Crevillente		
- * Club domestic league appearances and goals

Víctor Manuel Gomis Pastor (born 1 November 1982) is a Spanish former footballer who played as a left back.
