= Ronaldinho Gomes =

São Tomé and Príncipe footballer

Personal information
- Date of birth: 22 January 1979 (age 47)
- Place of birth: São Tomé and Príncipe
- Position: Defender

International career
Years	Team	Apps	(Gls)
2003	São Tomé and Príncipe	1	(0)

Ronaldinho Gomes (born 22 January 1979) is a Santomean footballer.

== International career ==
After Gomes was only on the bench in the qualifying match for the 2006 World Cup against Libya (0-1) on 11 October 2003 and made his debut for the Falcões e Papagaios a month later on 16 November 2003.

Gomes played for the São Tomé and Príncipe national football team on November 16, 2003 in a World Cup 2006 qualifying match against Libya in Benghazi. The squad lost 0-8.
