= Francisco Gómez =

Francisco Gómez is a Spanish name which may refer to:

== Academics ==
- Francisco Gómez Escobar, (1867–1938), writer and intellectual from Medellín, Colombia
- Frank Ray (born 1987), born Francisco Gomez, American singer

== Politicians ==
- Francisco Gómez de Sandoval, 1st Duke of Lerma (1552/1553–1625), favourite of Philip III of Spain
- Francisco Gomez (governor) (1576-1656), governor of New Mexico between 1641 and 1642
- Francisco Gómez de la Rocha (d. 1650), corregidor of Potosí, executed for mining fraud
- Francisco Gómez de Quevedo y Santibáñez Villegas (1580–1645), Spanish nobleman, politician and writer of the Baroque era
- Francisco Esteban Gómez (1783–1853), Venezuelan military officer
- Francisco Gómez Palacio y Bravo (1824–1886), Mexican writer, educator, jurist and Liberal politician
- Francisco Gómez (acting president) (died 1854), acting President of Honduras, 1852
- Francisco Gómez-Jordana, 1st Count of Jordana (1876–1944), Spanish soldier and politician
- Francisco Gómez (Salvadoran politician) (1796–1838), president of the state of El Salvador

== Sportspeople ==
- Francisco Gómez (athlete) (born 1957), Cuban Olympic sprinter
- Francisco Gomez (soccer, born 1979) (born 1979), retired American soccer player
- Francisco Gómez Kodela (born 1985), Argentine rugby union footballer
- Francisco Javier Gómez Noya (born 1983), Spanish triathlete
- Jesús Francisco Gómez (born 1992), Mexican-American professional boxer

== See also ==
- Francisco Gomes (disambiguation)
