= João Gomes (footballer, born 1996) =

Portuguese footballer

Personal information
- Full name: João Costa Gomes
- Date of birth: 29 July 1996 (age 30)
- Place of birth: Lisbon, Portugal
- Height: 1.85 m (6 ft 1 in)
- Position: Centre back

Team information
- Current team: União de Coimbra
- Number: 3

Youth career
- 2007–2009: FC Despertar
- 2009–2011: Montelavarenses
- 2011–2014: Casa Pia
- 2014–2015: Belenenses

Senior career*
Years	Team	Apps	(Gls)
2015–2017	Pêro Pinheiro		
2017–2018	Mafra	27	(3)
2018–2019	Estoril Praia	7	(1)
2019–2020	Leiria	4	(0)
2020	Águeda	1	(0)
2020	Torreense	4	(1)
2021	Olhanense	14	(1)
2021–2022	Cova da Piedade	21	(1)
2022–2023	Oriental Dragon	22	(1)
2024	Sintrense	8	(1)
2024	Moncarapachense	5	(0)
2025–	União de Coimbra	12	(0)
- * Club domestic league appearances and goals as of 13 April 2025

João Costa Gomes (born 29 July 1996) is a Portuguese footballer who plays for União de Coimbra as a defender.

== Football career ==
On 29 July 2018, Gomes made his professional debut with Estoril Praia in a 2018–19 Taça da Liga match against Farense.
