= Dr Francisco Luis Gomes District Library =

Coordinates: 15.25906°N 73.96829°E

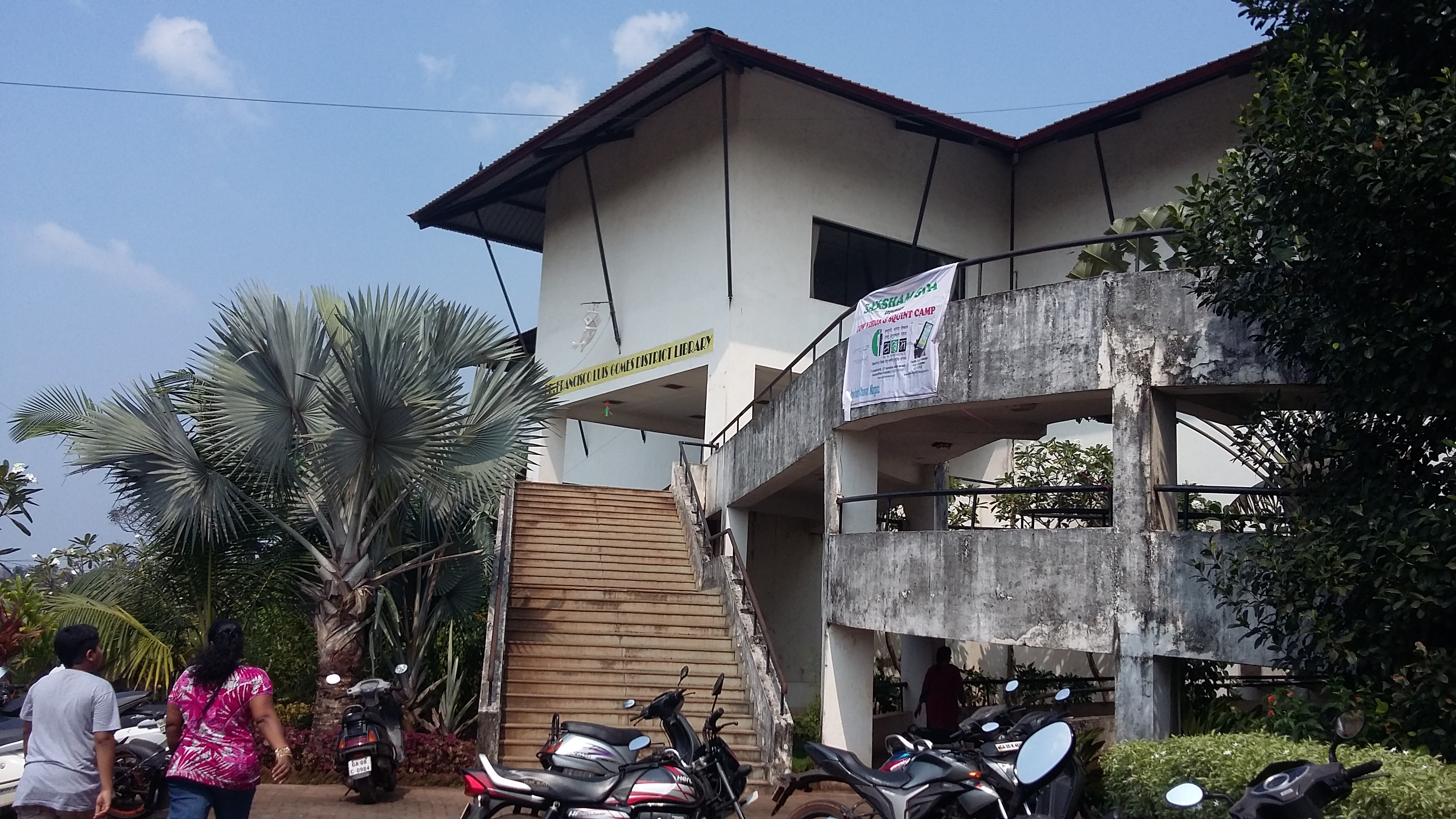
Entrance to the library.

The Dr Francisco Luis Gomes District Library is the major library in the district of South Goa, Goa, India. It is run and funded by the Government of Goa and was set up on 21 November 2010. The Library covers area of above 8000 square metres, comprising five floors, providing various services to the users. It is the second-largest library in Goa, after the Krishnadas Shama Goa State Central Library at Panjim, the state headquarters. This library is located just outside the city of Margao, which is also the headquarters of the South Goa district.

== Books ==
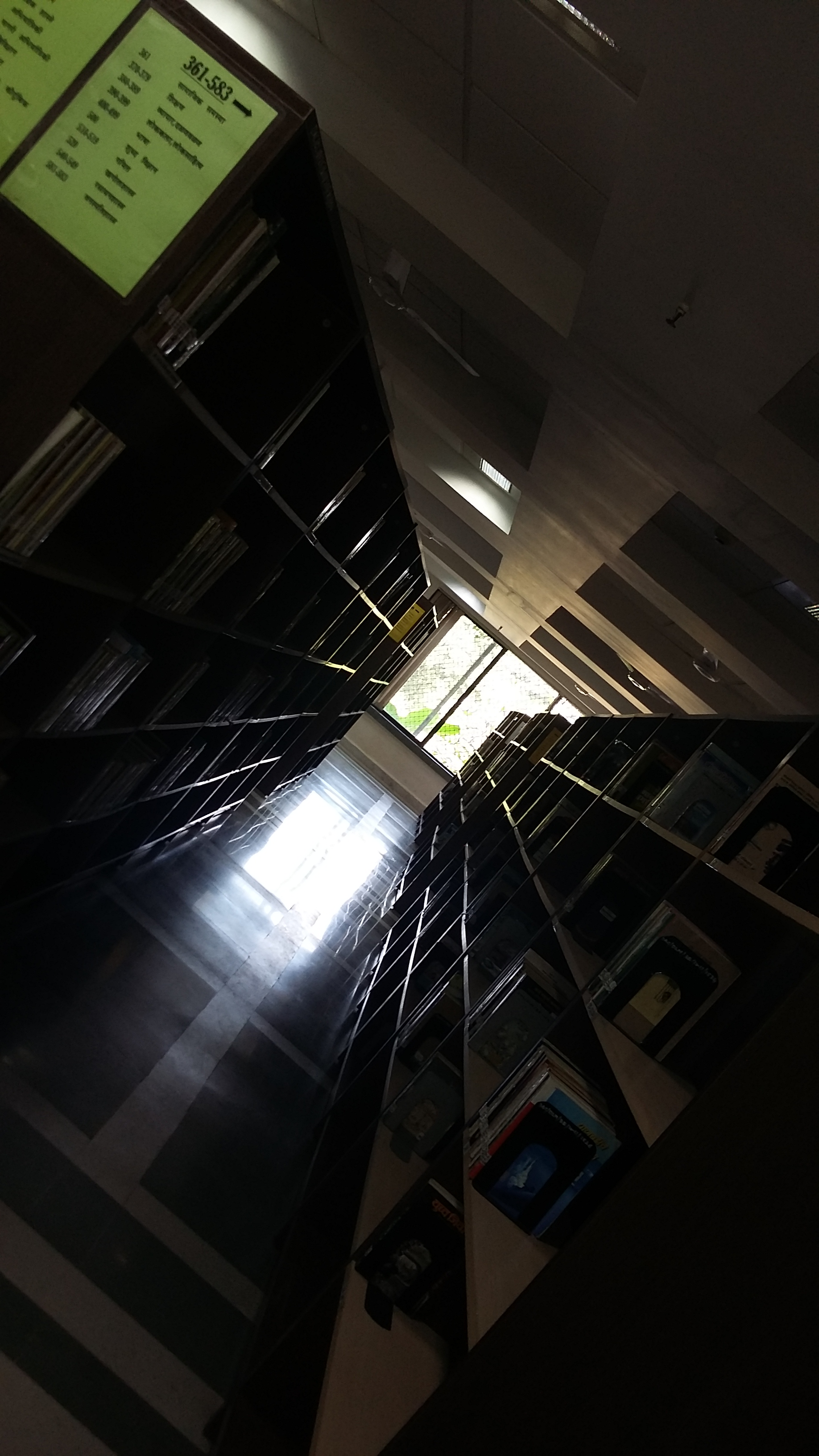
Literature section. Francisco Luis Gomes District Library, Navelim.

An estimated 40,000 books in diverse languages—English, Marathi, Hindi, Konkani and Sanskrit—besides newspapers and periodicals, are homed in this library.

Newspapers and periodicals are also available at the library, which has sections for children, Goa, records, a conference and lecture room, cafetaria, braille section and multi-purpose hall. Internet browsing is available too, and the library is kept open on Saturdays and Sundays.

As of December 2011, the library claimed a membership of 2300. The library has two buses to transport students, and a mobile library.

== History ==
The District Library located at Navelim, Salcete, Goa—just outside the South Goa headquarters city of Margao—is named after the intellectual and former Parliamentarian from Navelim, Dr. Francisco Luis Gomes, who was born on May 31, 1829. Dr. Francisco Luis Gomes came to be known as a great Goan Parliamentarian, a linguist, thinker, master of several European and Indian languages, medical doctor, writer, orator, economist, campaigner for rights and social worker. The foundation stone for the District Library was laid on February 5, 2007.

== Objectives ==
The Dr. Francisco Luis Gomes District Library started with the objective of providing a free public library and information service to the people of South Goa. The library also acts as community centre for informal education. It serves the needs of all members of community without any distinction of class, creed, occupation, race, sex and specially those of neo-literates and children.

== Stacks and Sections ==
The Stacks Section is on the ground floor. It spreads over 7,308 square feet (678.9 m^{2}). It has over 15,000 books which cover all subject areas. This section has a collection of books in four languages viz. English, Hindi, Marathi and Konkani. Books are issued for a maximum period of one month.

== Reference Section ==
The Reference Section is located on the second floor. It spreads over 4100 sq.fts. It has over 9,000 books which covers all subject areas. This section has a very good collection of encyclopedias, handbooks and other useful reference sources. This section houses materials which are geared to the needs of students and research scholars.

== Periodicals Section ==
The Periodicals section is located on the first floor. Newspapers, magazines and journals are kept in this section. All leading newspapers and magazine are available in this section for readers. At present the library subscribes to 21 leading dailies in different languages and 174 magazines in all categories to serve user needs.

== Braille Section ==
The Braille section is on first floor adjacent to Periodical Section. Special care is taken to facilitate visually handicapped readers in this section. This section has 14 Braille books, sculptures, Braille equipments and appliances, biological charts and geographical maps.

== Own Book Reading Section ==
The Own Books Section is on the first floor adjacent to the periodical section. Readers and users are being permitted to carry their personal study books, laptops and notebooks. Students are known to take the maximum benefit of this section.

== Computer Section ==
This section is located on the second floor of the library, adjacent to Reference Section. The library users can browse the internet. They can also download the information or take printouts.

== Goa Section ==
The Goa Section is on the fourth floor of the library. It has over 3864 collection of rare books among which the Goa section includes 2253 books and the law section includes 1611 books. This section has a good collection of books specifically on Goan history. This section provides reference services, photocopying of documents and information services. It also includes physical and political maps on Indian States.

== Children's Section ==
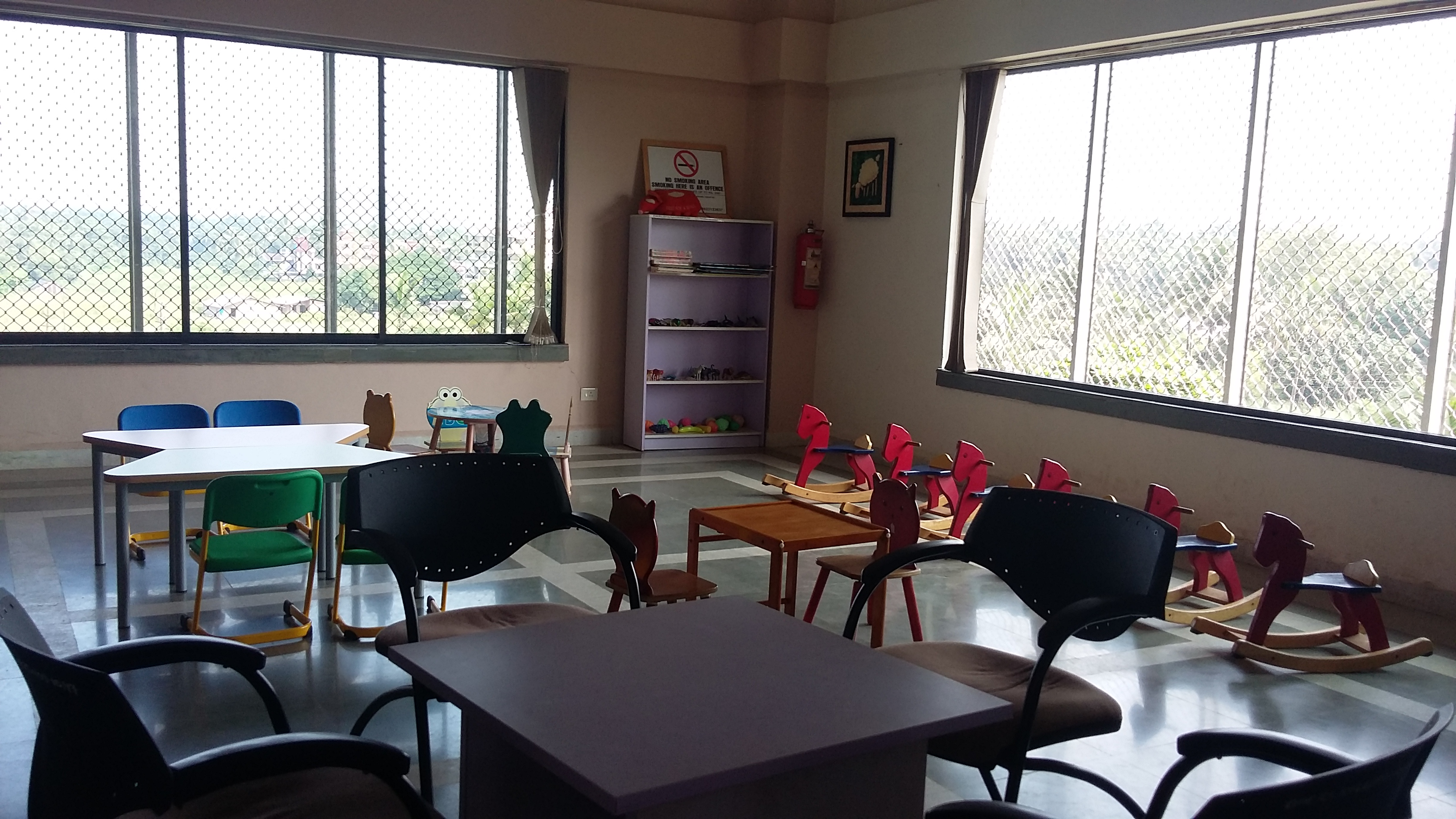
Children's play section. 2017.

The children’s section is on the third floor and consists of 5000 books and 274 CD/DVD materials, in addition to toys and games. This section comprises Reference Section, Audio-Visual Section, Toys and Games Section, Children’s Periodical Section and Children-Computer Section. Members can borrow books and magazines for a period of one month, after availing of membership.

== Other facilities ==
The regional office of Indian Council for Cultural Relations (ICCR) in Goa is also located at this venue. This was launched here in late November 2010.

Conference hall:

Lecture Hall:

Multipurpose Hall:

== Photo gallery ==
Dr Francisco Luis Gomes District Library

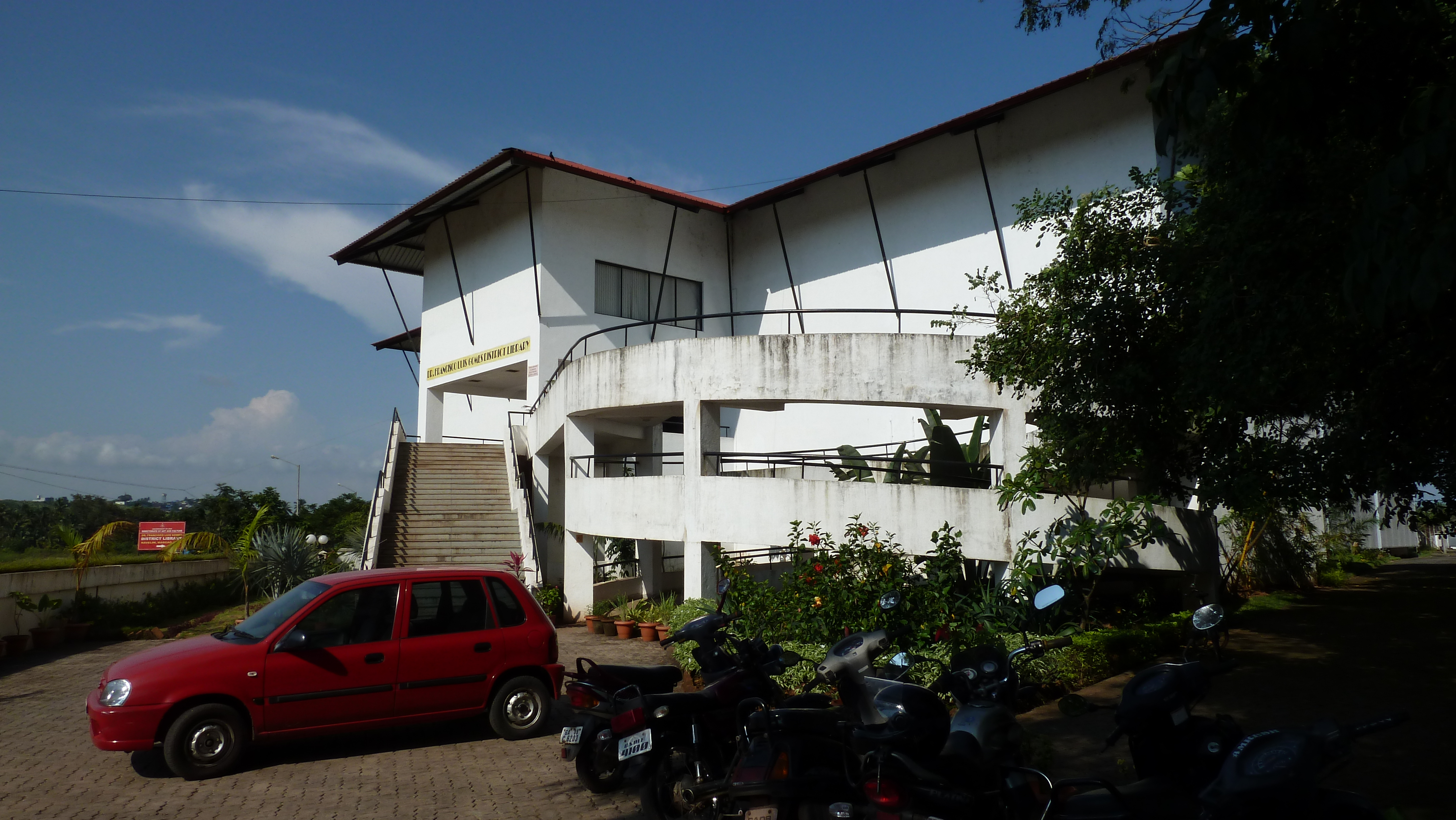
The library, from outside.

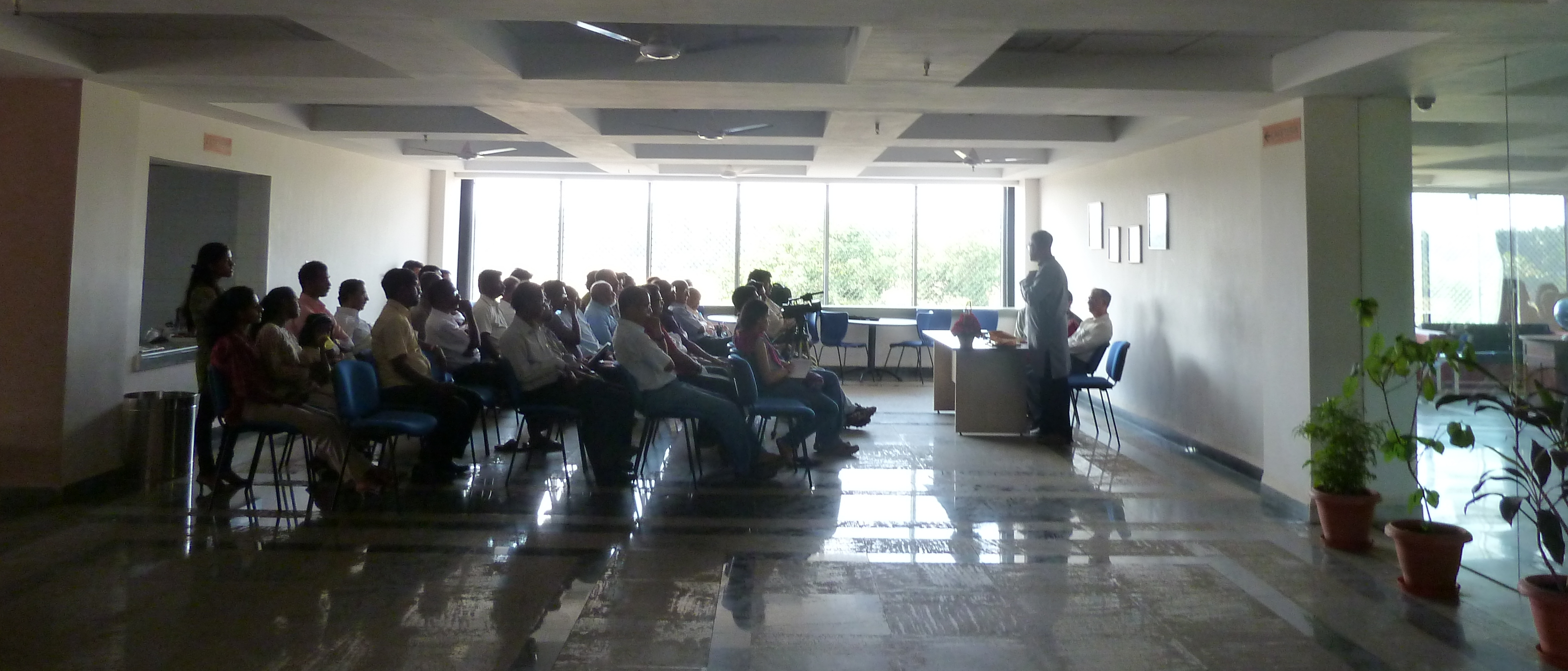
The spacious premises.

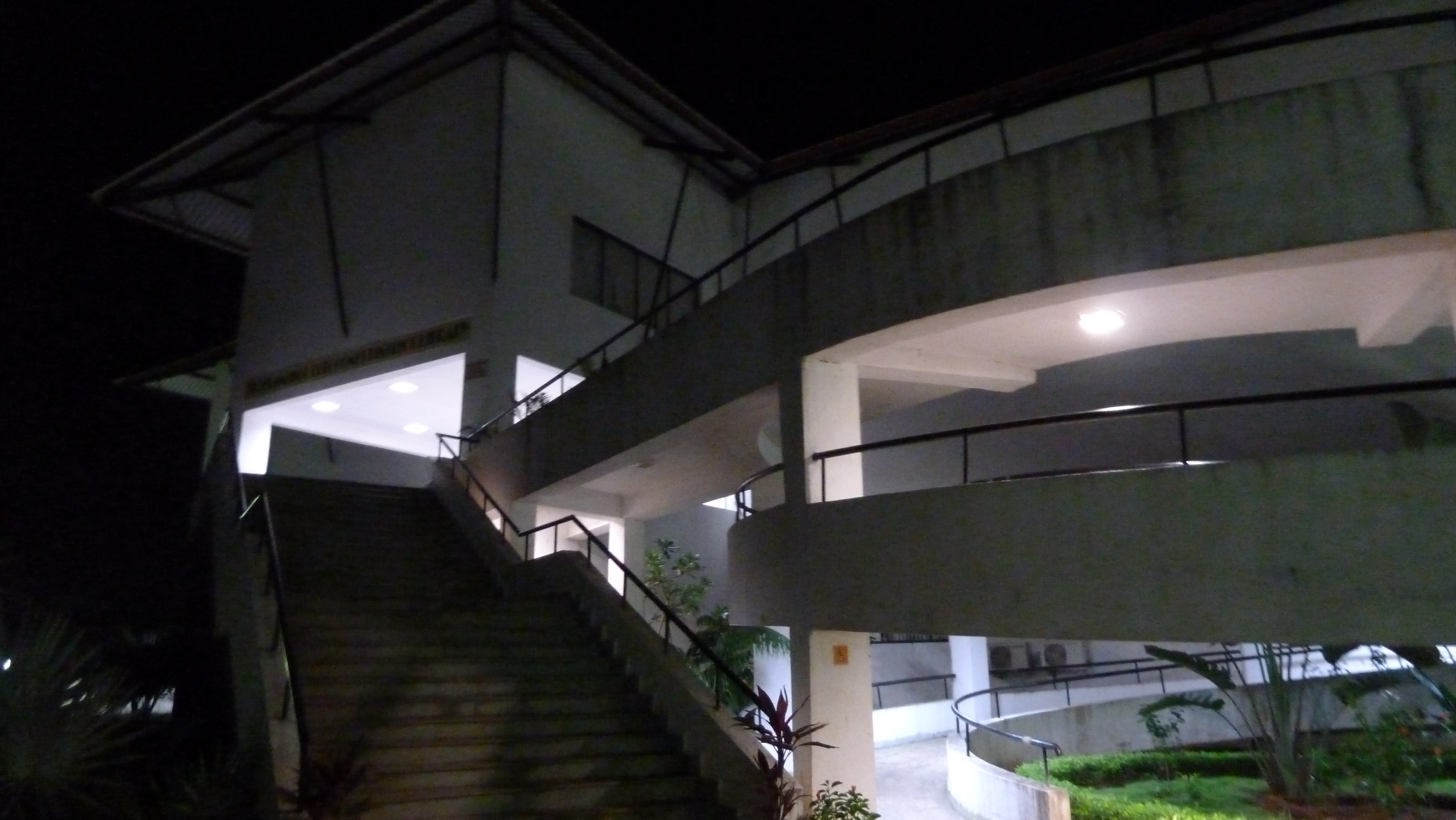
Library by night.

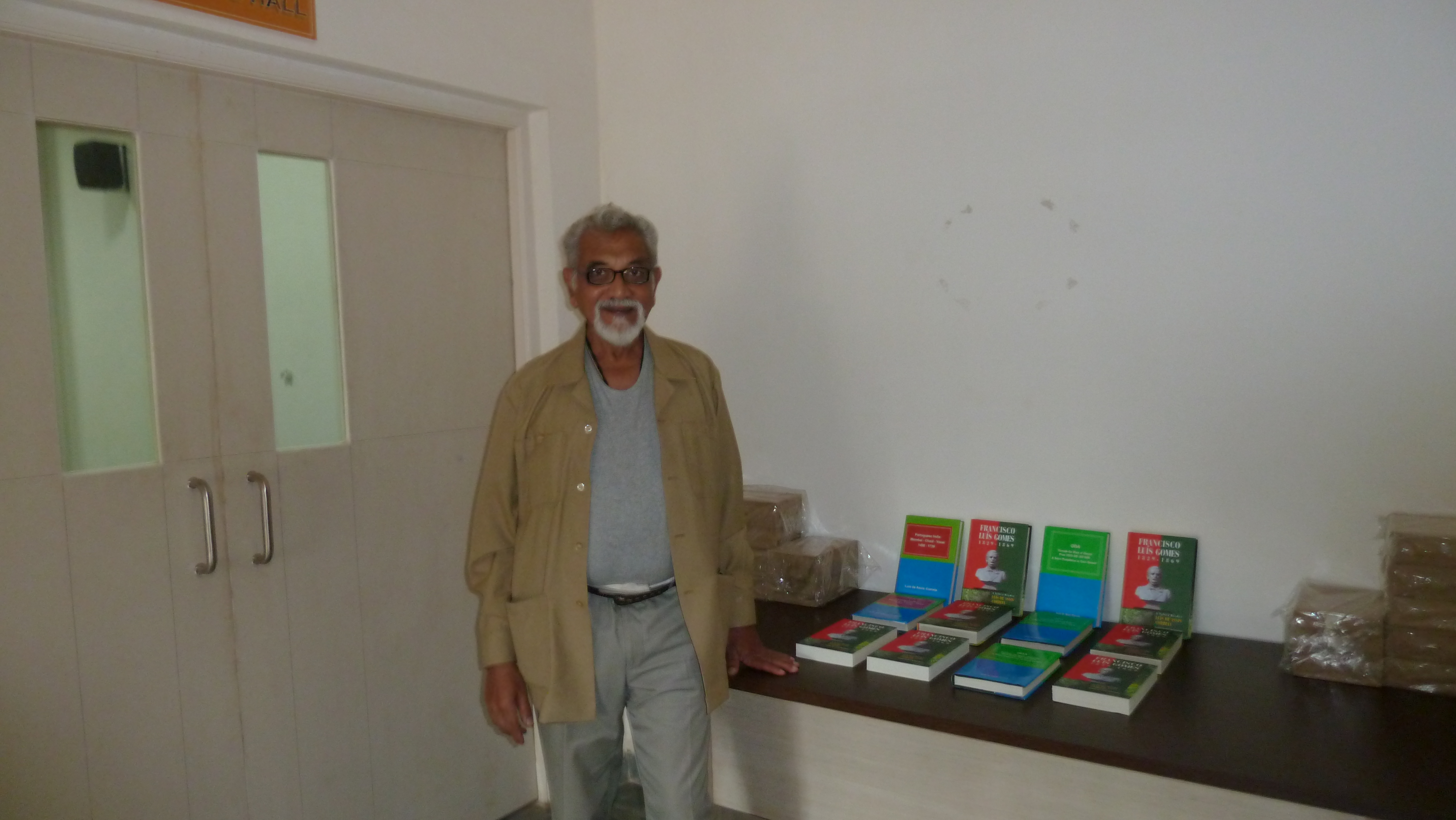
An author at a book release (Luis Assis Correia).

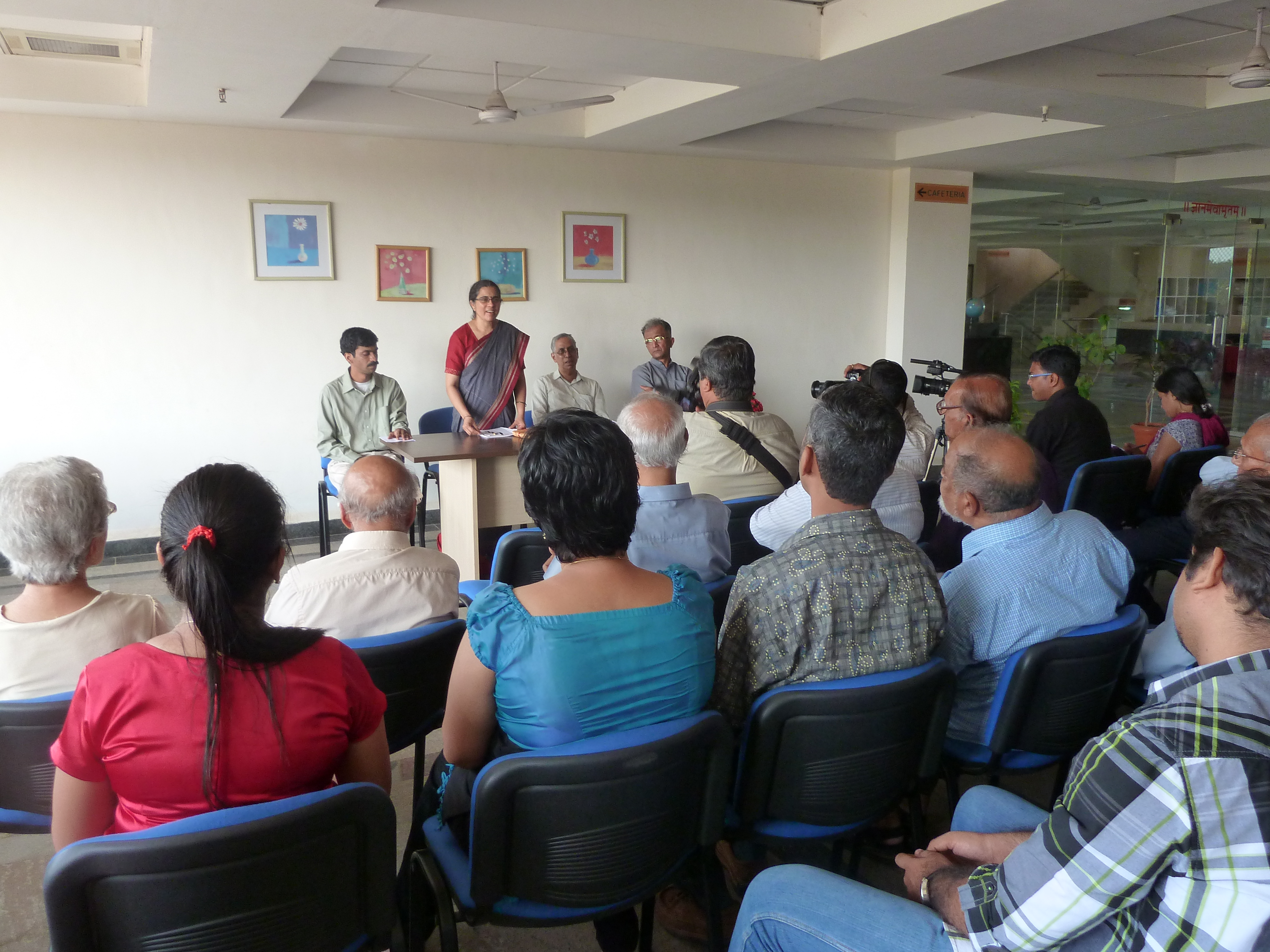
A book release in progress.

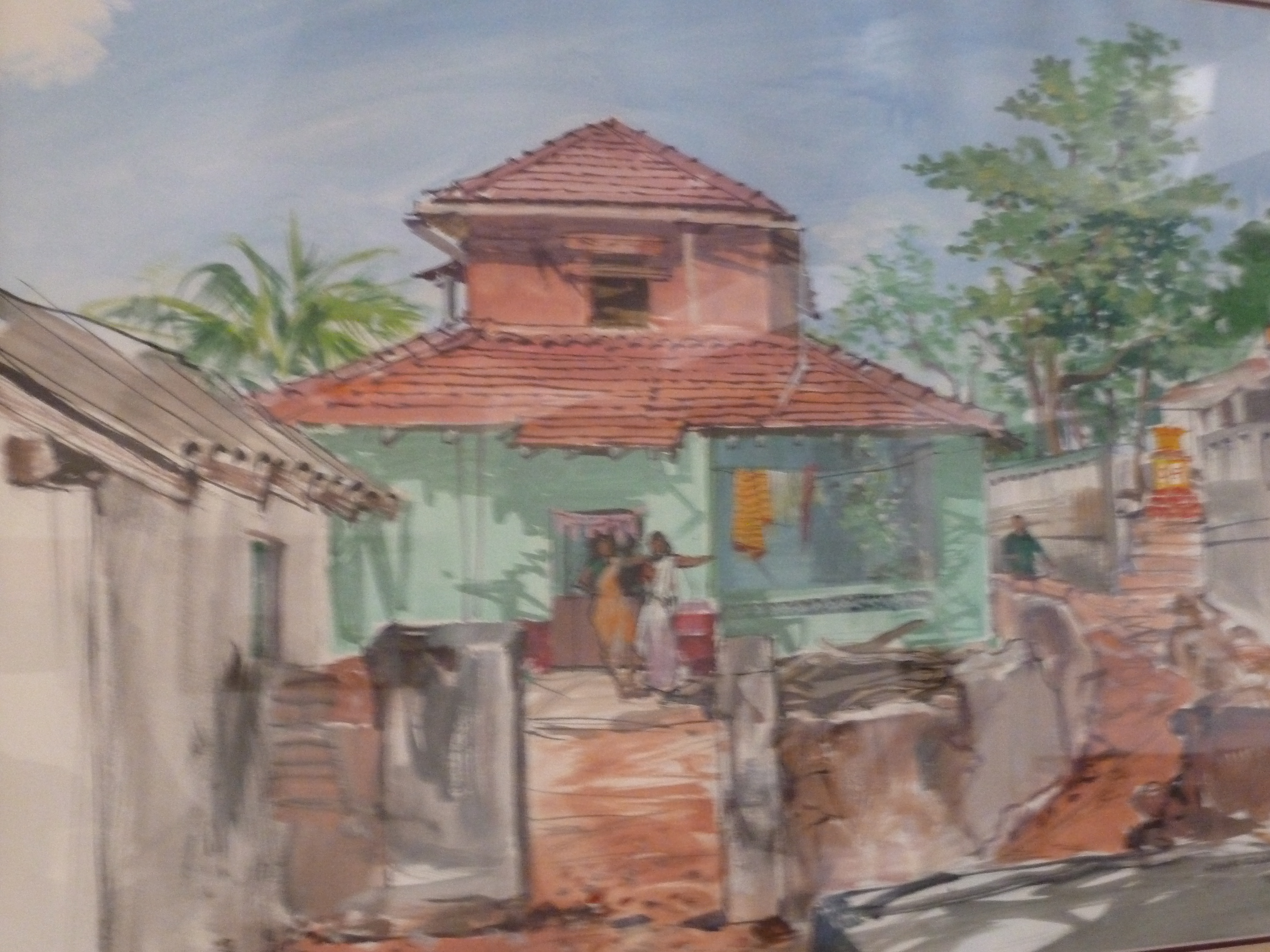
Painting at the library.

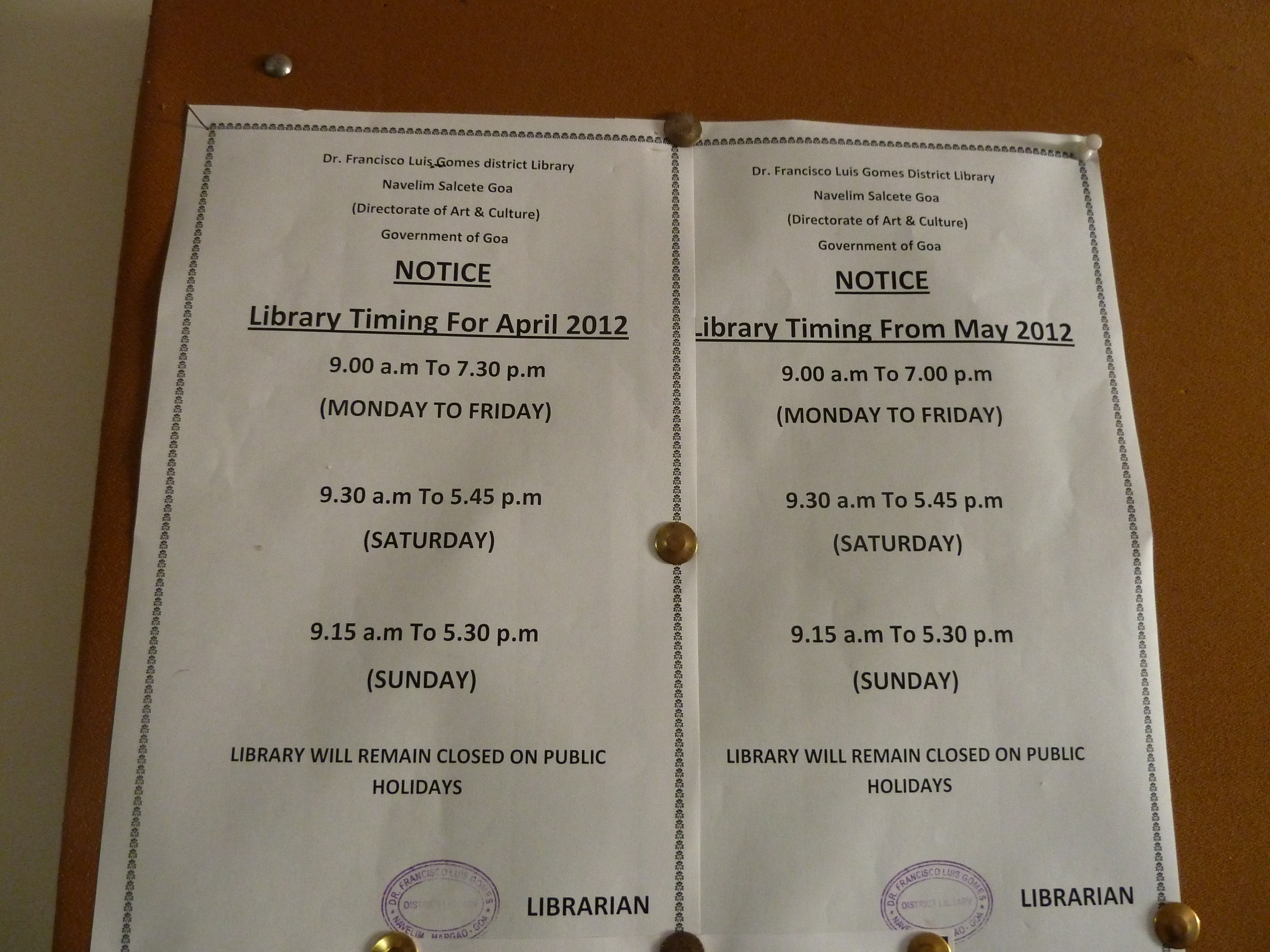
Library timings.

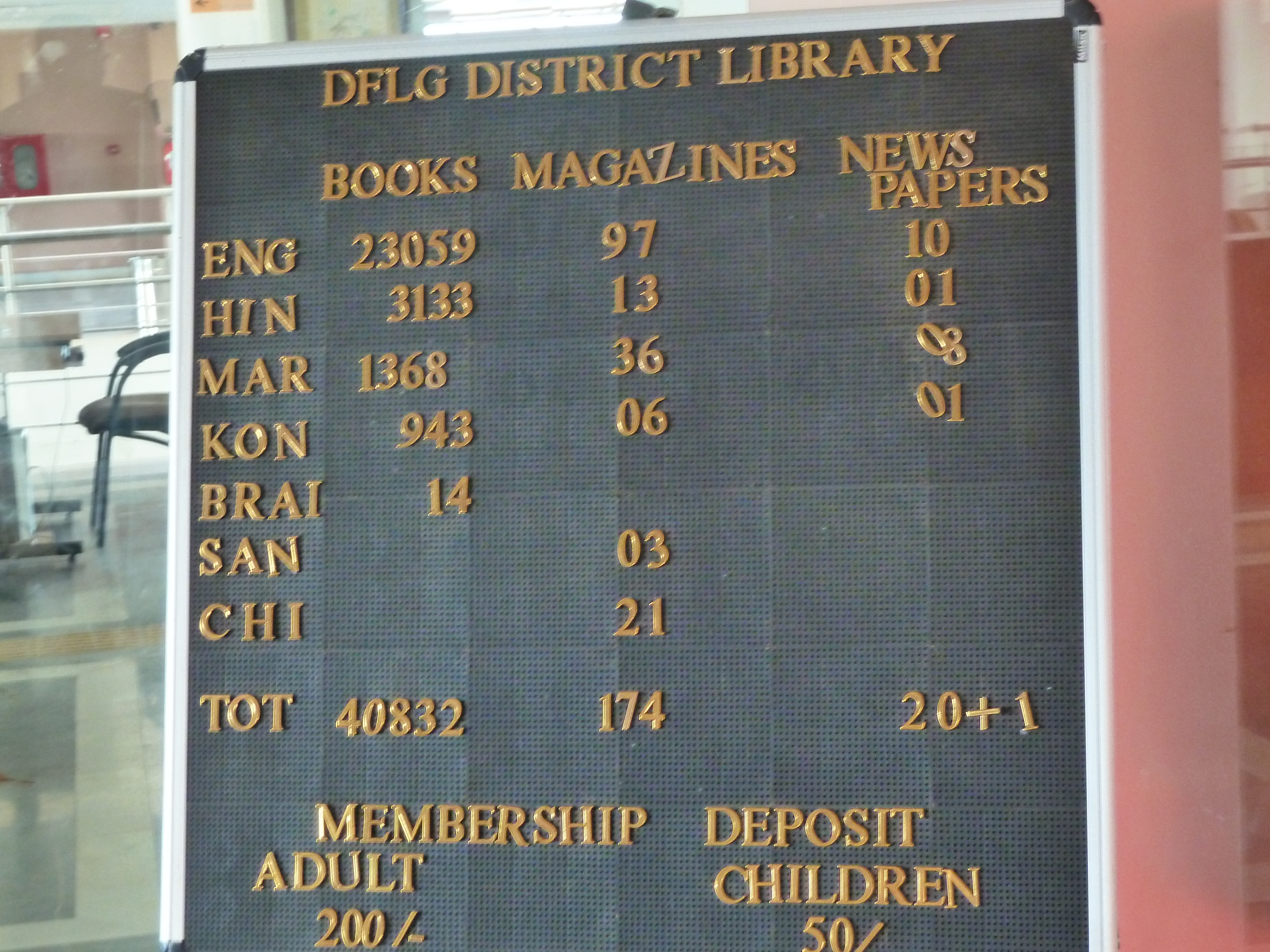
Details of books.

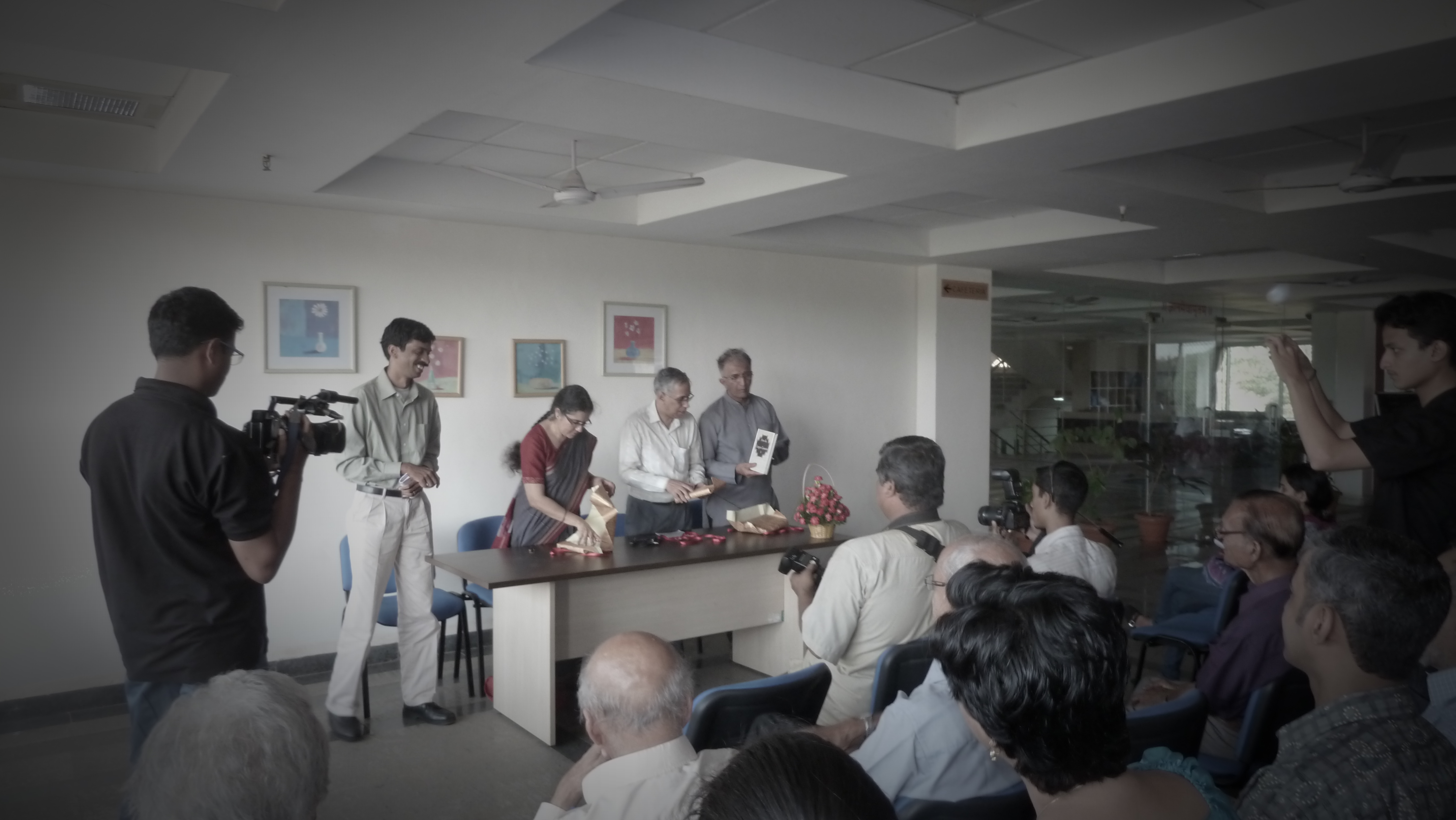
Release of Arte de Lingoa Canara.

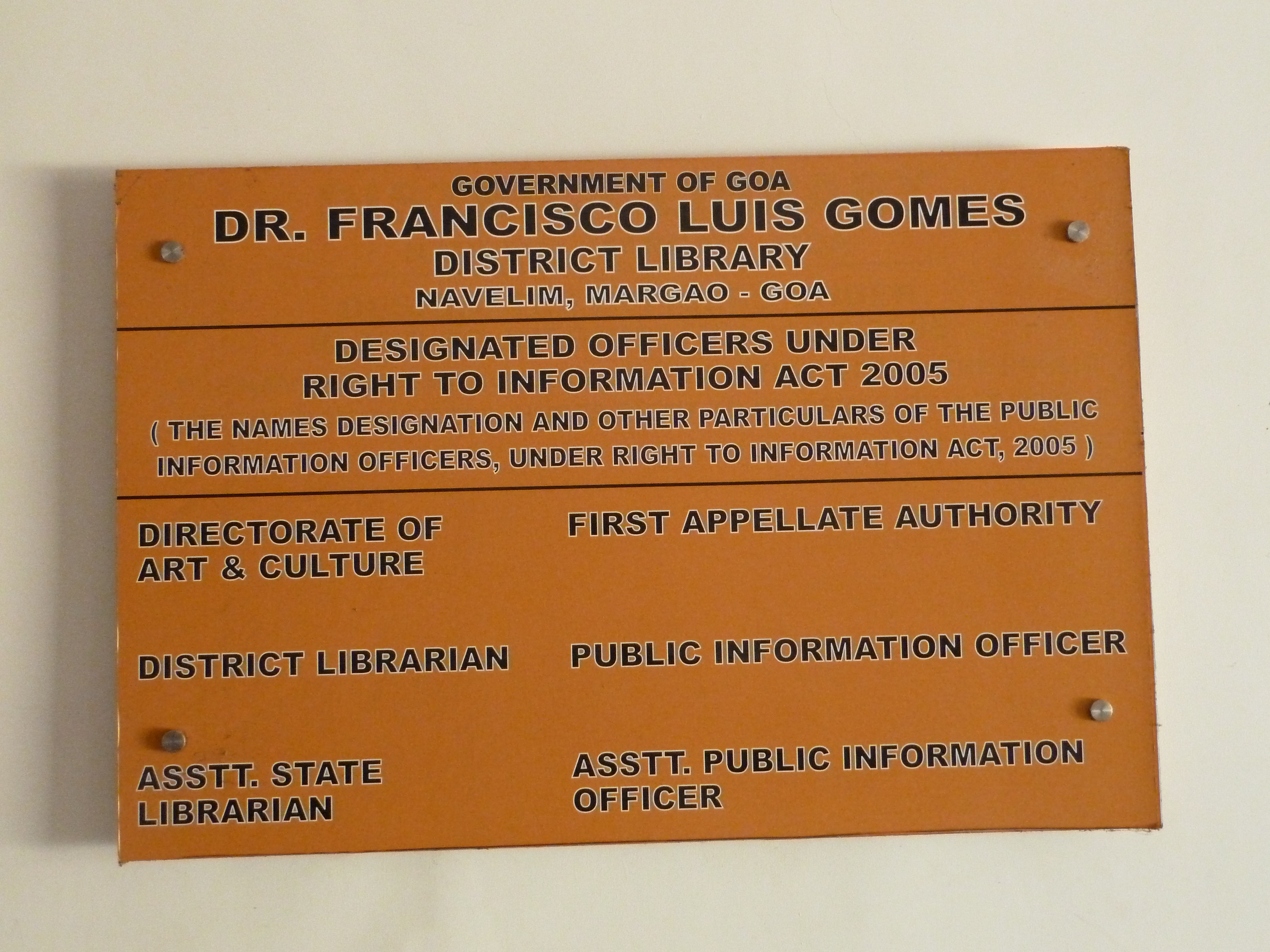
Details of the library.

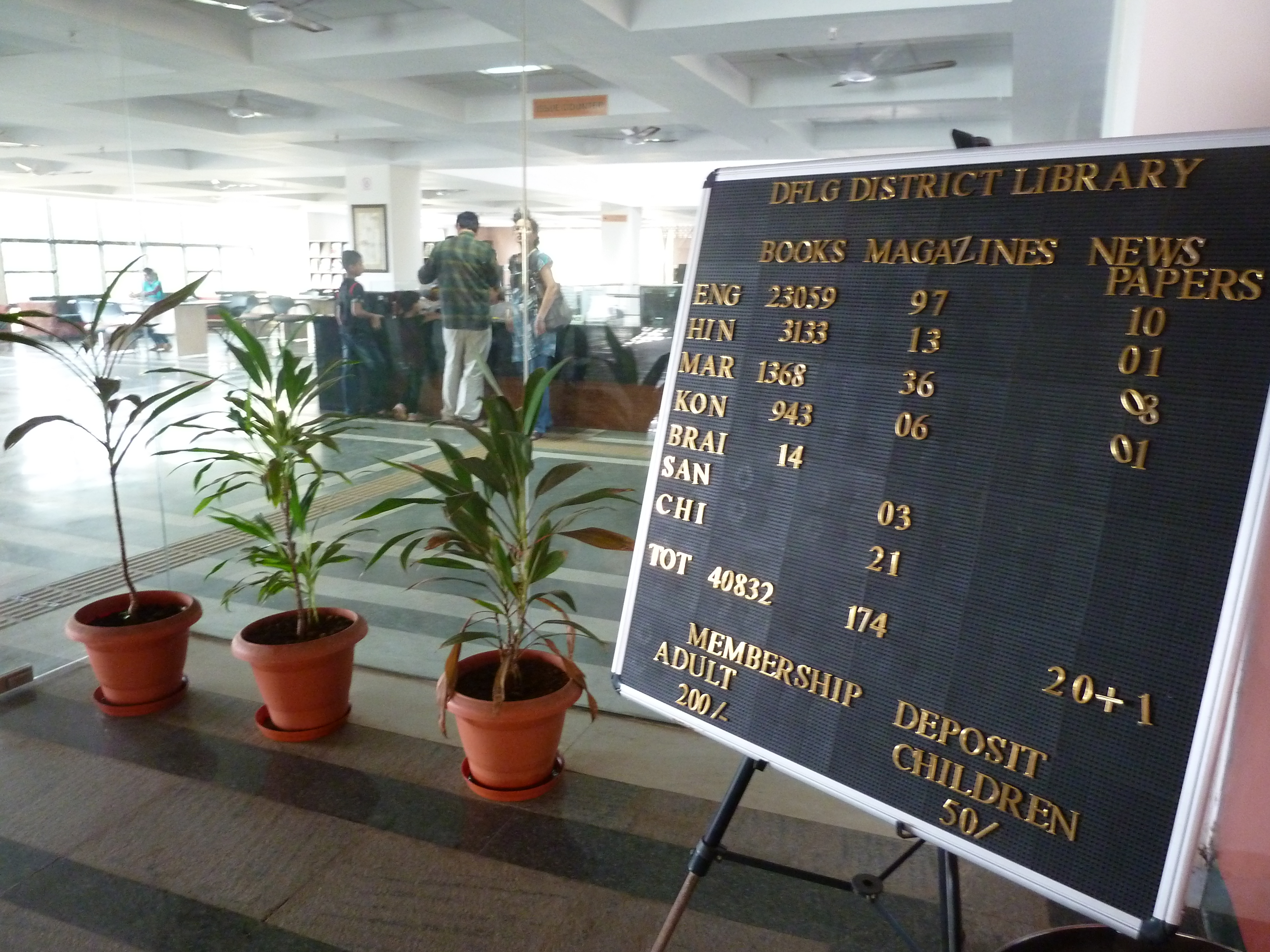
Books available.

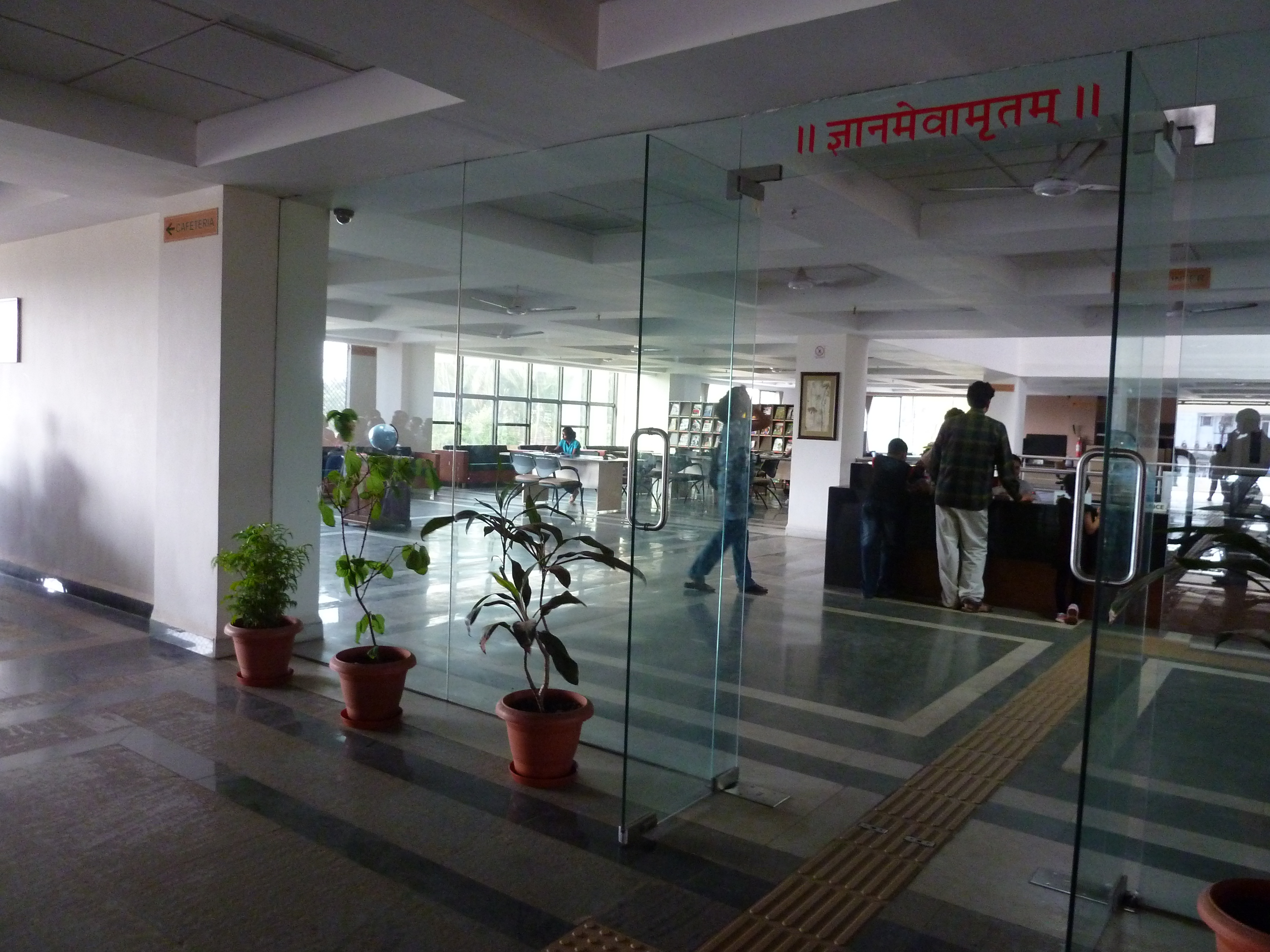
Lending section.

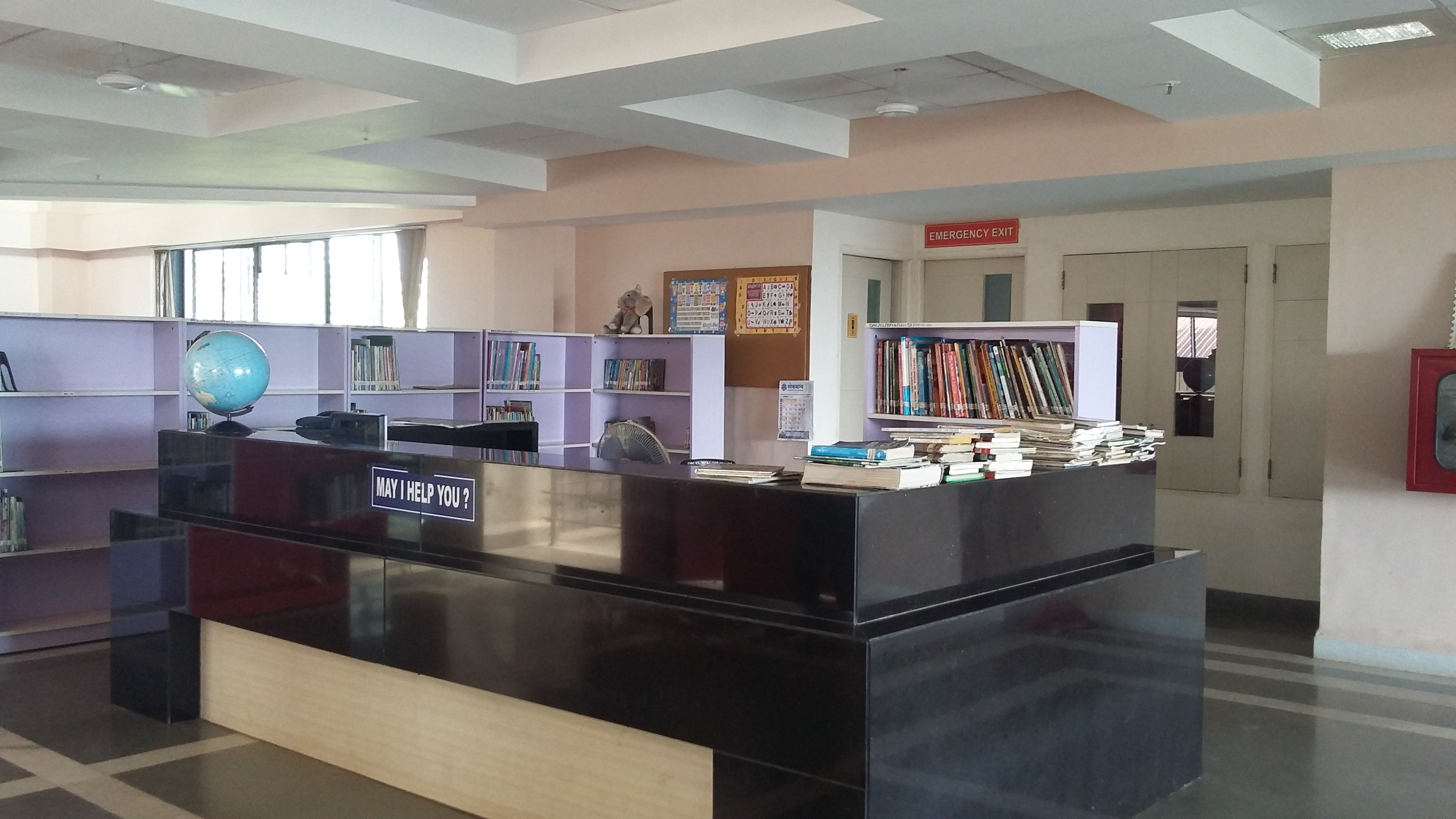
View of the children's section.

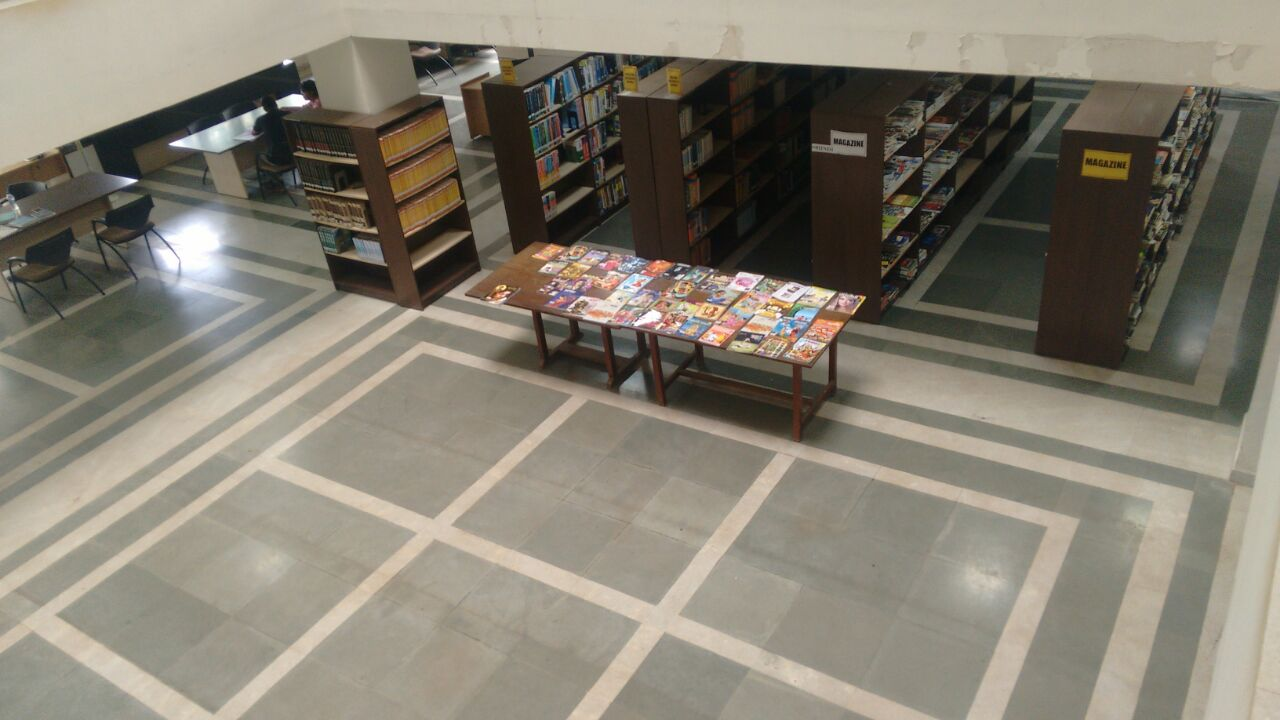
The ground floor.

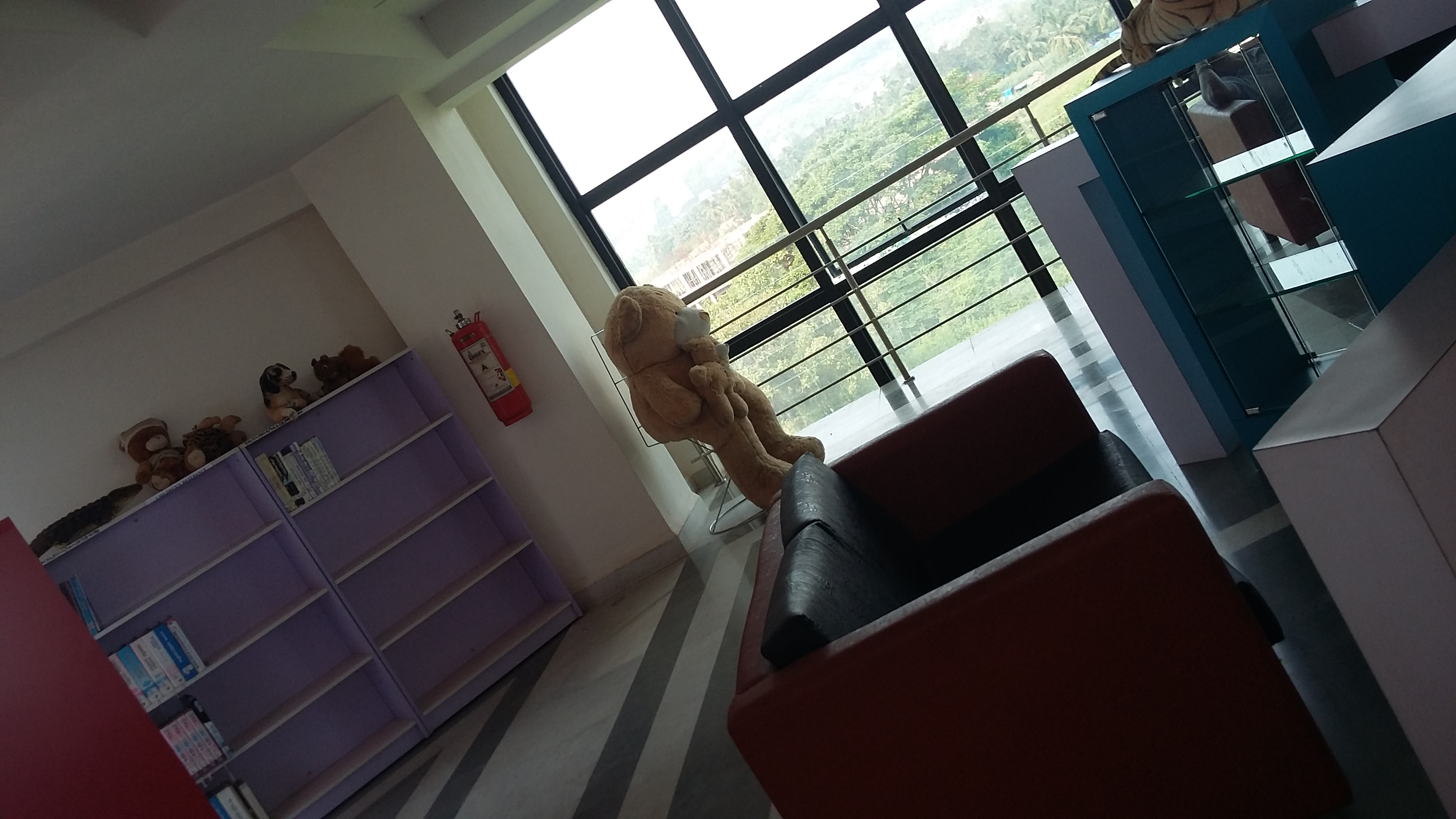
The children's section.

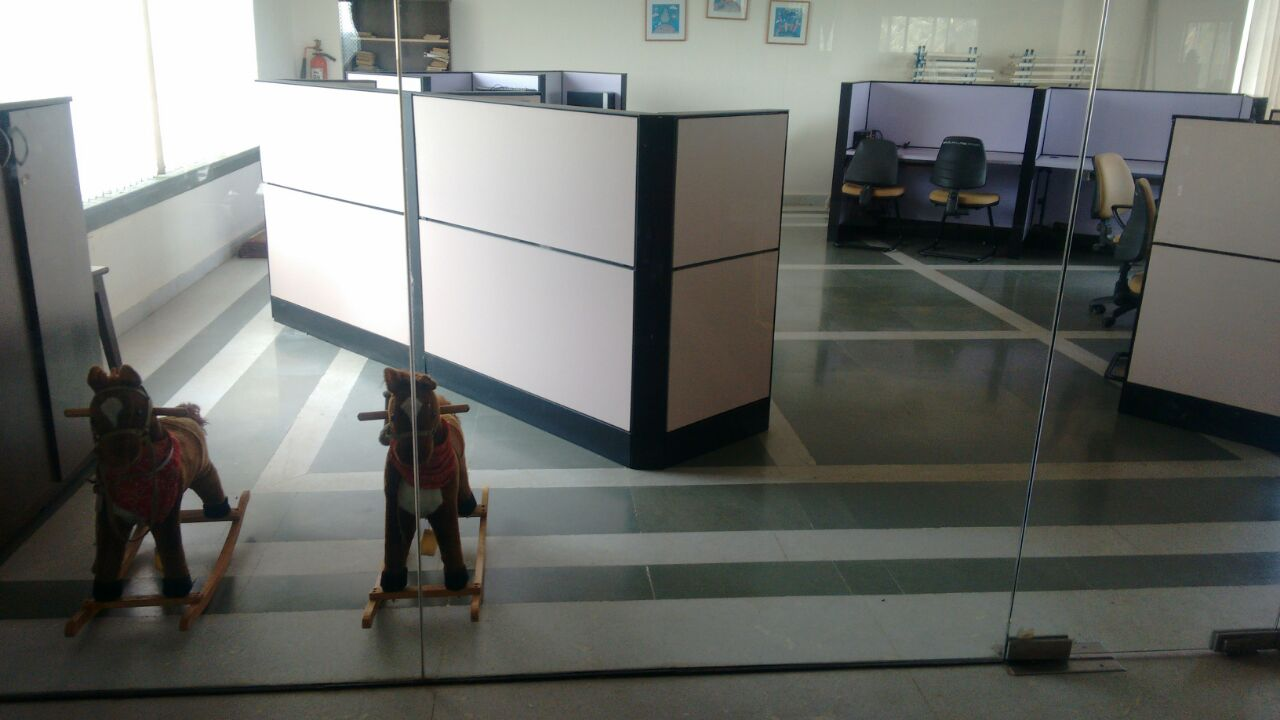
Computer lab.

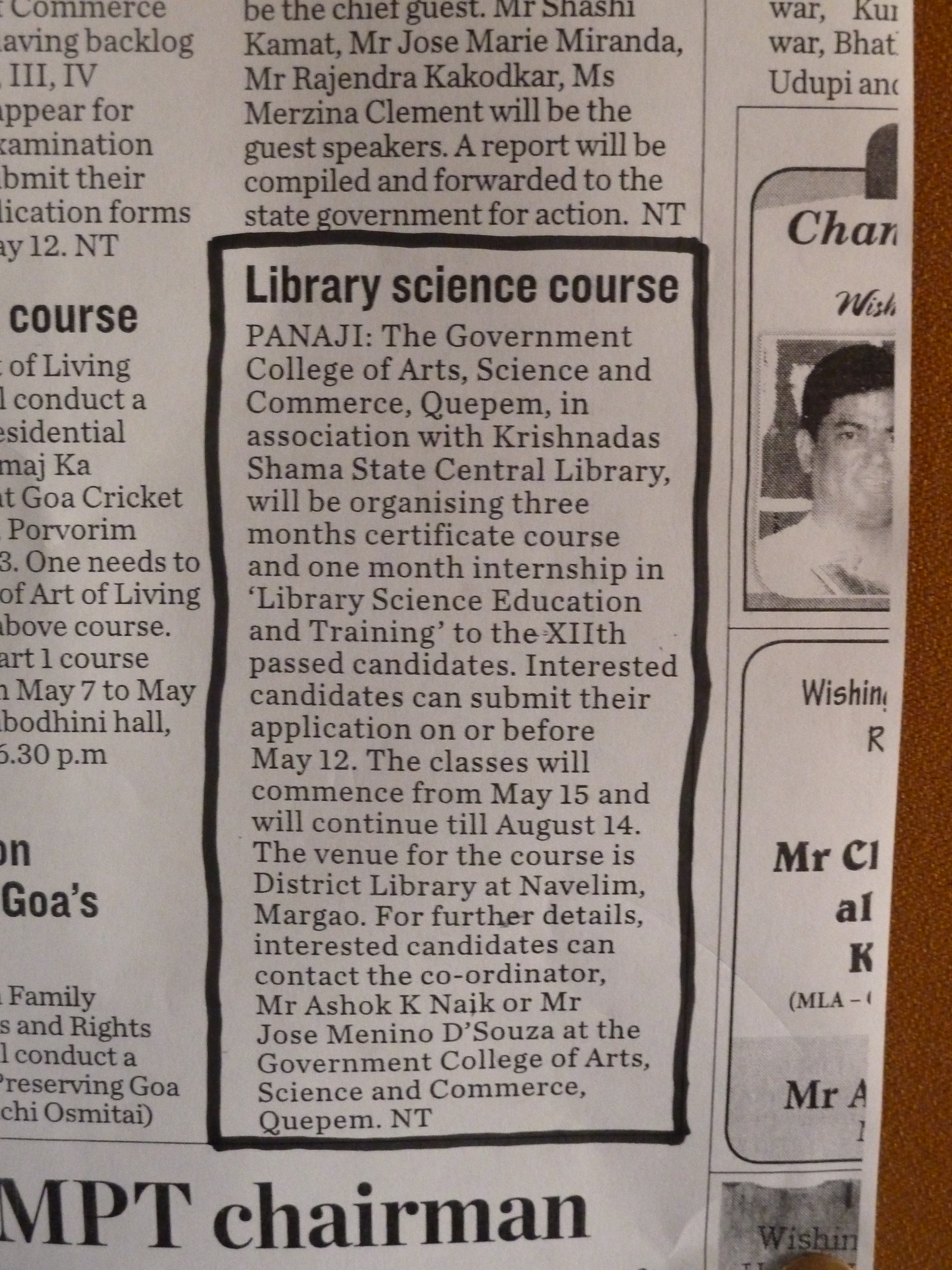
On the notice board.

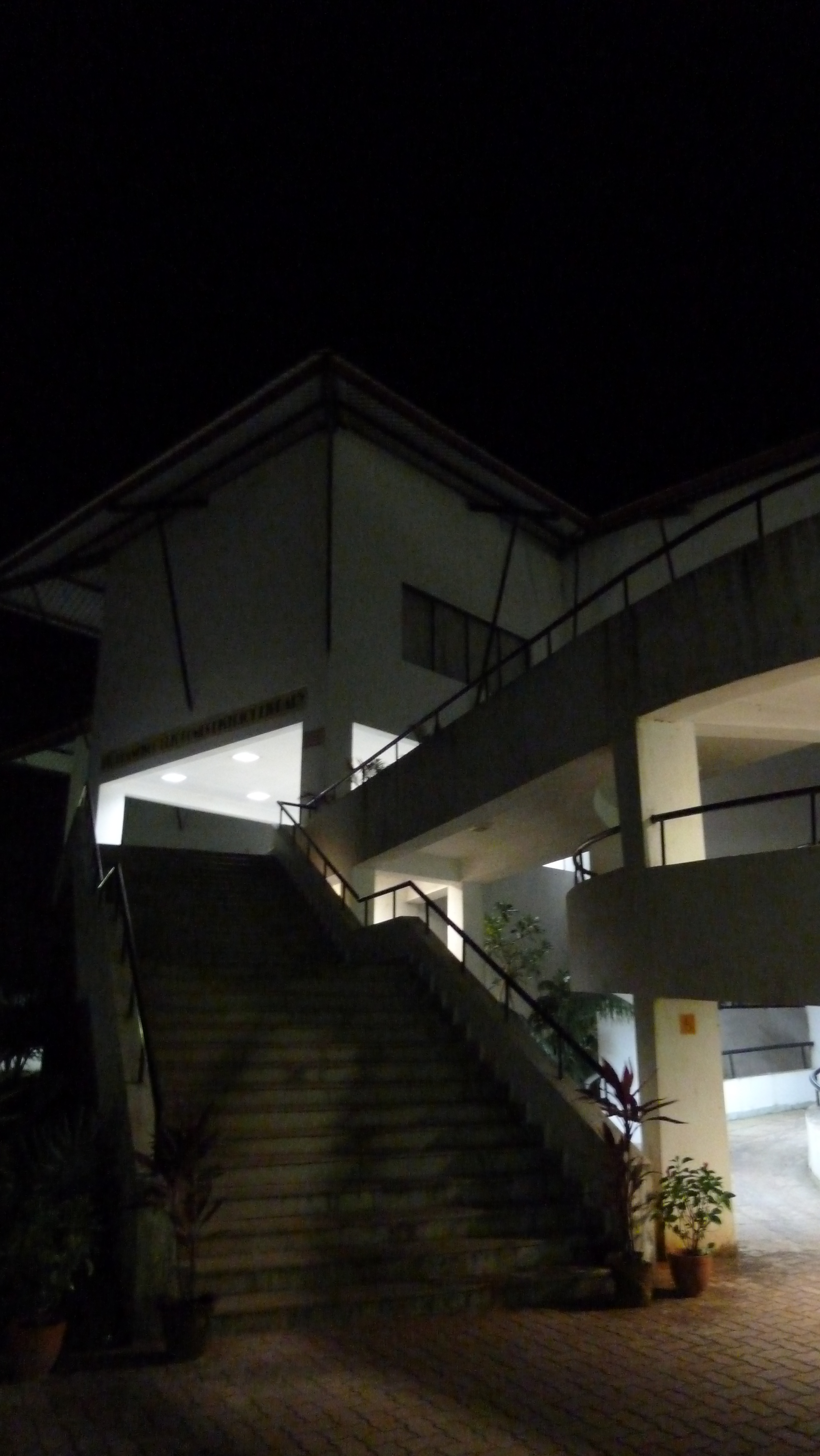
Library at night, another view.
