= Miguel Gomes (fencer) =

Portuguese fencing master

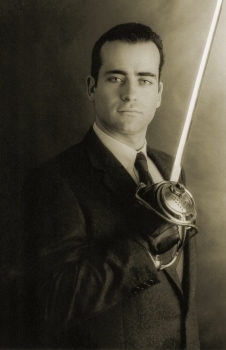
Miguel Gomes (2000)

Miguel Gomes (Portuguese pronunciation: [miˈɣɛl ˈɣomɨʃ]; born Miguel Barata de Andrade Gomes in 1972 in Lisbon) is a Portuguese fencing master.

He graduated in History at the University of Lisbon, and trained and qualified as Maître d'armes at the Centre National de Formation à l'Escrime in France.

Specialized in Stage combat with the French Master François Rostain (Comédie-Française and Conservatoire National Supérieur d'Art Dramatique) and fencing for cinema with the Master Claude Carliez.

In 2000, won the World Championship of Artistic Fencing in Vichy (as a Choreographer) and in 2002 obtained the title of Portuguese National Champion (as an Athlete - Teams). From 1998 to 2003 represented Portugal in various World Cups and European Clubs Champions Cups and was ranked worldwide with the International Fencing Federation (FIE).

Lived in Paris, where frequented the most prestigious Fencing Clubs. Taught fencing at École Polytechnique as well as at the Centre for High Sporting Performance in Fencing (CREPS d’Île-de-France).

Is a historical-military consultant at various institutions. Member of the Lisbon Geographical Society, Portuguese League of Combatants, Historical Society of Portuguese Independence, Lisbon Royal Association, Portuguese Association of Arms Collectors and the Portuguese Napoleonic Association. Was Director of the Portuguese Fencing Association until 2006 (for two mandates) and of the Portuguese Academy of Arms up till 2001.

Participated as a fencer in the film "Lagardère" directed by Henry Helman and has directed and choreographed duels and fights for more than twenty plays and TV shows.

== Honours ==
- National Fencing Champion (2002, Portugal)
- World Artistic Fencing Champion (Vichy 2000, France)
