= Marcel Gomis =

Senegalese footballer

Personal information
- Full name: Marcel Malie Gomis
- Date of birth: 20 August 1987 (age 39)
- Place of birth: Dakar, Senegal
- Height: 1.80 m (5 ft 11 in)
- Position: Winger

Youth career
- Stade Mbour

Senior career*
Years	Team	Apps	(Gls)
2006–2007	Famalicão	1	(0)
2007–2008	Olhanense	30	(2)
2008–2009	Shinnik	4	(0)
2009–2011	Olhanense	0	(0)
2010–2011	→ Vizela (loan)	37	(5)
2011–2012	Famalicão	27	(4)
2012–2013	Trofense	35	(1)
2013–2014	Famalicão	18	(1)
2014–2016	Pedras Salgadas	56	(9)
2016–2017	Pedras Rubras	28	(6)
2017	Sousense	3	(0)
2017–2018	Rebordosa	7	(1)
2018–2020	GD Joane		
- * Club domestic league appearances and goals

Marcel Malie Gomis (born 20 August 1987) is a Senegalese former professional footballer who played as a right winger.

== Football career ==
Born in Dakar, Gomis arrived in Portugal at the age of 19 as he signed for F.C. Famalicão in the third division. In the following transfer window he moved to S.C. Olhanense, proceeding to appear regularly over the course of one-and-a-half second level seasons, but mostly as a substitute.

In 2008, Gomis joined FC Shinnik Yaroslavl in Russia, appearing rarely during his spell and also suffering relegation from the Premier League. He subsequently returned to the Algarve with Olhanense but, in January 2010, after only 76 minutes of official play in the first half of his first season – against F.C. Paços de Ferreira in the Portuguese League Cup– he was loaned to F.C. Vizela from division three for one-and-a-half seasons.

In summer 2011, Gomis was released by Olhanense and returned to Famalicão, still in the third tier. He continued to compete mainly in that level in the following years.
