= Louis Gomis =

Louis Gomis may refer to:

- Louis Gomis (boxer), French boxer who participated in the 1984 Olympics
- Louis Gomis (footballer born 1971), French-Senegalese footballer who played for OGC Nice
- Louis Gomis (footballer born 1974), Senegalese footballer who played for 1. FC Nuremberg
