= Sumana Gomes =

Sri Lankan actress

Sumana Gomes සුමනා ගෝමස්
- Born: 23 May 1962 (age 64); Dehiwala-Mount Lavinia, Sri Lanka
- Other name: හෙළ සිනමාවේ කාම රැජිණ
- Citizenship: American
- Education: University of Colombo
- Occupation: Actress
- Years active: 1978–2008
- Notable work: Kamasutra (2002); Ragaye Unusuma (1997); Unusum Rathriya (1999); Ege Vairaya II (1997); Ege Vairaya III (1998); Ege Vairaya IV (2000)
- Height: 5 ft 5 in (1.65 m)
- Spouse: Gregory Torotolio (m. 2012)
- Awards: Best Actress

Sumana Gomes (born 23 May 1962: Sinhala: සුමනා ගෝමස්), is a Sri Lankan cinema actress. Often regarded as the "sexiest actress in Sri Lankan film history", Gomes is credited as the premiere sex symbol and pioneer of blue film subculture in Sri Lankan cinema. She began her acting career at a young age, starring in the 1978 blockbuster Kundala Keshi directed by Wimalanath Dissanayaka. During a career that spanned 30 years, Gomes starred in close to 35 movies which also included biographical dramas, mainstream comedies and Erotic thrillers.

== Early life ==
Gomes was born on 23 May 1962 in Dehiwala-Mount Lavinia. When she was a child she aspired to become a nurse or a policewoman. She graduated from the University of Colombo Faculty of Arts and enjoyed dancing which paved the way for her first movie role in Kundala Keshi.

== Career ==
After a 6-year hiatus from her debut, Gomes played several minor roles in Sasara Chethana, Maubima Nathnam Maranaya, Raja Wedakarayo and Salambak Handai all as dancers. Her supporting roles with dialogues included Obata Divura Kiyannam where she portrayed Dilu's friend, Aragalaya which was her first challenging role and Hitha Hoda Surayoo where she starred opposite Vijaya Kumaratunga in 1995. However, her rise to mainstream limelight started when she collaborated with Louie Vanderstraeten and Sunil T. Fernando in the Erotic thriller genre.

=== Rise to fame and stardom ===
Gomes's first breakthrough role was 'Appa Soma' in the 1997 erotic blockbuster Ege Vairaya II directed by Louie Vanderstraeten and produced by Sunil T. Fernando. The movie portrayed an LGBTQIA+ theme and also featured Chandi Rasika who played the main role 'Indira' in Ege Vairaya I. In the same year Gomes starred in Karu Disanayaka's detective thriller Ragaye Unusuma where she portrayed 'Saroja', a journalist who went undercover to assist police raid a brothel and apprehend the perpetrators. Both movies made it to the podium at the 26th Sarasaviya Awards in 1998 winning 2nd and 3rd places in the 'Famous Film' award category, making Gomes a star.

In 1998, Gomes continued as the main actress in mainstream erotic blockbusters Akkai Nangi as 'Sachitra Gamage' and Ege Vairaya III as 'Ragika Subha Gurusinghe'. By this time her movies had escalated to box office hits. In 1999, Gomes starred in the 900th film in Sri Lankan cinema Unusum Rathriya as 'Renu', a painter who entangles herself in an extramarital affair opposite Suresh Gamage and Sando Harris. In 2000, Gomes starred in Ege Vairaya IV as 'Kumari', ending the Ege Vairaya franchise.

In 2002, Gomes's stardom reached its peak with the box office record breaker Kamasutra where she portrayed 'Madam Sarojini' a nymphomaniac who could not control her desires opposite Shamal Atapattu, Kapila Sigera and Roshan Pilapitiya.

== Legacy ==
During 80s and 90s, Gomes was featured as the cover girl in magazines including Sarasaviya, Aaradhana, Sarasi, Tharunaya, Thiratharu, Malsara and Vikasitha. She was nicknamed the 'Red flame of Sinhala cinema' by investigative journalist Rohana Kumara. She was also widely acclaimed as හෙළ සිනමාවේ කාම රැජිණ or කාම ධේනුව (translated: the sex queen of Sri Lankan cinema). Voters of 'Top Ten list' global ranking website voted Sumana Gomes as No. 1 in its Greatest Sri Lankan Actresses list.

== Personal life ==
Gomes married Gregory Torotolio, an Italian head chef on 31 January 2012. They live in New York City, United States.

== Selected filmography ==
- No. denotes the Number of Sri Lankan film in the Sri Lankan cinema.
- In bold text are movies she starred as the 'main actress'.

Year	No.	Film	Role
1978	384	Kundala Keshi	Dancer
1984	600	Maubima Nathnam Maranaya	Cabaret dancer
1985	611	Obata Divura Kiyannam	Dilu's friend
1986	626	Peralikarayo	herself as Sumana
1987	650	Raja Wedakarayo	Club dancer
1988	655	Rasa Rahasak	Dancer
1991	712	Salambak Handai	Go-go dancer
1992	727	Bajar Eke Chandiya	Dancer
1997	847	**Ege Vairaya II**	Appa Soma
1997	856	**Ragaye Unusuma**	Journalist Saroja
1998	869	Gini Avi Saha Gini Keli	Sergeant Nallathambi's lover
1998	877	**Akkai Nangi**	Sachitra Gamage
1998	882	**Ege Vairaya III**	Ragika Subha Gurusinghe
1999	900	**Unusum Rathriya**	Renu
2000	918	**Ege Vairaya IV**	Kumari
2002	960	**Kamasutra**	Sarojini/ Madam
