= Nácia Gomes =

Cape Verdean singer

- Born: Maria Inácia Gomes Correia; 18 July 1925; Santiago Island, Cape Verde
- Died: 4 February 2011 (aged 85); Praia, Cape Verde
- Occupation: Singer
- Spouse: Paulino Correia De Oliviera (died)
- Children: 4

Maria Inácia Gomes Correia (18 July 1925 – 4 February 2011) was a Cape Verdean traditional singer of finaçon. She began singing at age 17, and recorded three albums and multiple singles throughout her career, either as a solo artist or as part of a duo. Gomes also performed at festivals in Cape Verde and abroad. A book about her was published in 1985. Gomes was illiterate and could not write her own songs, which were improvised and recorded on Compact Discs.

== Biography ==
Gomes was born Maria Inácia Gomes Correia on 18 July 1925, in the municipality of São Miguel on the Cape Verdean island of Santiago Island. She was one of 12 children and was raised as a strict follower of the Roman Catholic faith in an area with poor living conditions. Although Gomes did not receive a formal education and was illiterate, she started to sing a genre of Cape Verdean music called finaçon based on the traditions of Africa. She began to sing at weddings, baptisms, parties and other community events in the local town of Tarrafal from age 17. Gomes also performed at secular regional folk festivals and at municipal events.

The resulting performances made her famous on Santiago Island, and her finaçon frequently talked about the economic and social conditions of her surroundings. Gomes' lyrics criticised the sub-par living standards ignored by the Portuguese colonial government and then the national Cape Verdean government following independence. One of her finaçon topics praised independence as she reminded its leaders that without food or shelter the population would die. Other topics she sang about were young people's social responsibilities and love. Since Gomes was illiterate, she did not write her own songs, which were improvised and recorded on Compact Discs (CD). She also recited poetry and philosophy, told stories and taught Cape Verdean history. The Cape Verdean writer and cultural scholar, Tomè Varela da Silva, published a Crioulo-language book called Finasons Di Nha Nasia on Gomes in 1985.

She performed at Seville Expo '92, a festival held at the Smithsonian Museum in the United States in 1995, and at Expo '98 in Portugal. In 1999, Gomes travelled to the United States to record Rei di Tabanka alongside Ferro Gaita, and recorded an eight-track CD called Nha Nácia Gomi Cu Sê Mocinhos the following year. Her final album, Finkadu na Raiz, was recorded in partnership with drummer and signer Ntoni Denti d' Oro in 2005. In all, Gomes recorded three albums during her lifetime. She recorded the singles Fernandi Sosa, Pensa Mundo, Busca Meio, Bota cana, Parida, Balança côxa, Santa Catarina and S. Simon d'Ajuda either as a solo artist or as part of a duo, and was featured in multiple films such as Guenny K. Pires' The Journey of Cape Verde: In Search of Cape Verdianity.

== Personal life ==
She was married to the contracted worker and immigrant in São Tomé and Príncipe Paulino Correia De Oliviera and had four children with him. Gomes was admitted to the intensive care unit of the Hospital Agostinho Neto, Praia on the evening of 1 February with hypertension and a stroke. She died three days later on 4 February. The Cape Verdean government declared a national day of mourning and all flags at all public institutions across the country were lowered to half-mast in Gomes' honour.

== Legacy ==
She was nicknamed the "Queen of Finaçón", and was also known by the name "Nha Nácia Gomi (English: Mrs. Nácia Gomes). A Cabo Verde Airlines plane was named after her to celebrate her career. In May 2017, the Gamboa Festival paid tribute to Gomes' life and career.
