= Alliance for Minority Participation =

The Alliance for Minority Participation (also Louis Stokes Alliances for Minority Participation of LSAMP) is a fellowship program funded by the National Science Foundation. It is a multilevel academic program intended to help diversify the STEM workforce by starting at the university level. Students participated early in their career, as early as high school until they reach a post-doctoral degree. LSAMP's goal is to significantly increase student participation in Science, Technology, Engineering and Mathematics. Special emphasis is on supporting underrepresented groups in academia. Among them are African-Americans, Alaskan Natives, American Indians, Hispanic Americans, Native Hawaiians, and Native Pacific Islanders. Activities focus on recruitment, retention and enrichment of the student, in this way attempting to reform education practices.
