= Manoel Gomes =

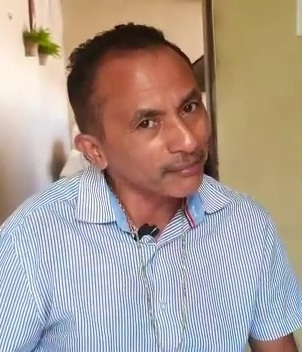
- Born: Manoel Jardim Gomes; December 2, 1969 (age 56); Balsas, Maranhão, Brazil
- Years active: 2019–present
- Musical career
- Genre: Brega
- Instrument: Vocals

Manoel Jardim Gomes (born 2 December 1969), better known as Manoel Gomes, is a Brazilian singer and composer. He's known for creating the song "Caneta Azul" ("Blue Pen"), which became a meme.

== Biography ==
Manoel Gomes was born in Balsas, Maranhão, on December 2, 1969. He has had an interest in music since his youth and started songwriting at 15 years old. He studied until high school and worked as a security guard until 2019.

== Career ==
He gained notoriety in the second half of 2019 due to the release of his song "Caneta Azul", based on his personal experience of frequently losing his pens at school. The song achieved viral popularity and was reinterpreted by various musical artists, such as Wesley Safadão and Simone Mendes. He only formally released the song after its viral success.

After his song went viral, Gomes began traveling across Brazil and visiting different states. It was at this time that Gomes announced that he was intending to release his first album of completely original songs. Despite being delayed by the COVID-19 pandemic in Brazil, the singer released his debut album Caneta Azul on August 21, 2020. In addition to the title track, which was produced in two version: bachata and axé, the album included songs such as "Maura", "Ela É Muito É Vagabunda" and "Parabéns".

=== Politics ===
Gomes was able to leverage the prior virality and success of his song "Caneta Azul" to revive his popularity in 2022 through the usage of social media platforms like TikTok and Instagram. Gomes then ran in the 2022 Maranhão gubernatorial election under the Liberal Party for the State Deputy title in his home state of Maranhão but lost after only receiving 7,543 votes.

== Discography ==
=== Studio albums ===
Title	Details
Caneta Azul	Released: September 17, 2019; Label: QES Laércio da Costa; Format: digital download, streaming
Coletânea Manoel Gomes (Blue Pen) - 27 Sucessos	Released: February 24, 2023; Label: Tiehit Records; Format: digital download, streaming

=== Singles ===
Year	Title	Peak chart positions	Album
Year	Title	BRA	Album
2019	Caneta Azul, Azul Caneta	—	
2021	Aula de Sentada	—	
2023	Lá Ele	—	
2023	Olha, Se Você Não Me Ama	—	
2023	Márcia Ferreira	—	
"—" denotes a recording that did not chart or was not released in that territory.

==== "Olha, se Você não Me Ama" ====
"Olha, se Você não Me Ama" (lit. 'Look, if You Don't Love Me') is a song by Brazilian singer-songwriters Gomes and Tierry, released as a single in February 2023. During his stay in Salvador, Manoel Gomes met singer and composer Tierry and participated in one of his shows singing songs such as "Caneta Azul". Tierry, in turn, invited him to record "Lá Ele", composed by the singer, and also to record Olha, se Você não Me Ama, which had not received an official recording. At the time, Tierry stated that the partnership with Manoel Gomes was also intended to help him organize his musical catalog after problems that Gomes faced with his former manager.

"Olha, se Você não Me Ama" is a composition by Manoel Gomes in partnership with Tierry. The track originally consisted only of Manoel's chorus. He sang the song in interviews and videos, which helped it become viral even before any official release. Later, Tierry created the other verses of the song. Like "Lá Ele", the musical production of the track is by keyboardist and arranger Cássio Henrique.

"Olha, se Você não Me Ama" was released on February 10, 2023 by the independent label Tiehit Records. The official music video for the track was released on the same day, on Manoel Gomes' channel, and had a script created by Tierry.
