= 2013 CR Flamengo season =

Flamengo
2013 season
- Chairman: Eduardo Bandeira de Mello
- Manager: Dorival Júnior (until 16 March); Jorginho (18 March – 14 June); Mano Menezes (14 June – 19 September); Jayme de Almeida (from 25 September)
- Brazilian Série A: 16th
- Rio de Janeiro State League: Runners-up
- Copa do Brasil: Champions
- Top goalscorer: League: Hernane (16 goals); All: Hernane (36 goals)
- Highest home attendance: 68,857 (vs. Atlético Paranaense in the Copa do Brasil)
- Lowest home attendance: 1,764 (vs. Resende in the Rio de Janeiro State League)
Home colours	Away colours	Third colours

The 2013 season is the 118th year in the club's history, the 102nd season in Clube de Regatas do Flamengo's football existence, and their 43rd in the Brazilian Série A, having never been relegated from the top division.

== Kits ==
This season marks the return of Adidas as Flamengo's supplier after 21 years.

Supplier: Adidas / Sponsor: Caixa / Back of the shirt: Peugeot / Numbers: TIM

Home	Home alternate	Away	Away alternate	Away alternate 2	Third	Third alternate

Goalkeeper	Goalkeeper alternate	Goalkeeper alternate 2	Goalkeeper alternate 3	Goalkeeper alternate 4	Goalkeeper alternate 5

== Club ==
=== First-team staff ===
As of July 9, 2014.

Position	Name
Coach	Jayme de Almeida
Assistant coach	Cantarele
Assistant coach	Lucas Silvestre
Assistant coach	Ivan Izzo
Assistant coach	Paulo Henrique
Goalkeeping coach	Cantarele
Fitness coaches	Marcelo Martorelli
Fitness coaches	Daniel Guimarães
Fitness coaches	Marcos Lima
Fitness coaches	Celso de Rezende
Medical staff manager	José Luiz Runco
Doctors	Marcelo Soares
Doctors	Luiz Claudio Baldi
Doctors	Marcio Tannure
Doctors	Serafim Borges
Physiotherapists	Fabiano Bastos
Physiotherapists	Mario Peixoto
Physiologist	Claudio Pavanelli
Dietitian	Leonardo Acro
Dietitian	Sílvia Ferreira
Psychologist	Paulo Ribeiro
Masseurs	Adenir Silva
Masseurs	Esmar Russo
Masseurs	Jorginho

=== Other information ===
Chairman	Eduardo Bandeira de Mello
Ground (capacity and dimensions)	Engenhão (46,931 / 105x68 meters)
Ground (capacity and dimensions)	Estádio do Maracanã (78,838 / 105×68 meters)

Source: CBF

=== First-team squad ===
As of 9 July 2014, according to combined sources on the official website.

Note: Flags indicate national team as defined under FIFA eligibility rules; some limited exceptions apply. Players may hold more than one non-FIFA nationality.

No.	Pos.	Nation	Player
1	GK	BRA	Felipe
2	DF	BRA	Leonardo Moura (captain)
3	DF	BRA	Chicão
4	DF	CHI	Marcos González
5	MF	PAR	Víctor Cáceres
7	FW	BRA	Rafinha
8	MF	BRA	Elias (on loan from Sporting CP)
9	FW	BRA	Hernane
10	MF	BRA	Gabriel
14	DF	BRA	Wallace
15	MF	BRA	Luiz Antônio
16	DF	BRA	João Paulo (on loan from Mogi Mirim)
17	MF	BRA	Adryan
18	FW	BRA	Lucas Quintino
19	FW	BOL	Marcelo Moreno (on loan from Grêmio)
20	MF	BRA	Carlos Eduardo (on loan from Rubin Kazan)
26	FW	BRA	Paulinho (on loan from XV de Piracicaba)
27	DF	BRA	André Santos

No.	Pos.	Nation	Player
28	MF	BRA	Bruninho
29	FW	BRA	Nixon
30	MF	BRA	Val
33	DF	BRA	Samir
34	DF	BRA	Digão
35	MF	BRA	Diego Silva (on loan from XV de Piracicaba)
36	DF	BRA	Rodrigo Frauches
37	GK	BRA	César
38	DF	BRA	Welinton
40	MF	BRA	Amaral
43	MF	BRA	Mattheus
48	GK	BRA	Paulo Victor
-	DF	BRA	João Felipe
-	DF	BRA	Felipe Dias
-	MF	BRA	Recife
-	MF	BRA	Rodolfo
-	FW	BRA	Igor Sartori

Players with Dual Nationality

- (Chile) (Brazil) Marcos González
- (Bolivia) (Brazil) Marcelo Moreno

=== Out on loan ===
Note: Flags indicate national team as defined under FIFA eligibility rules; some limited exceptions apply. Players may hold more than one non-FIFA nationality.

No.	Pos.	Nation	Player
—	GK	BRA	Marcelo Carné (loan to Boavista)
—	DF	BRA	Welinton (loan to Alania Vladikavkaz)
—	DF	BRA	Júnior César (loan to Atlético Mineiro)
—	DF	BRA	Thiago Medeiros (loan to Avaí)
—	DF	BRA	Everton Silva (loan to Boavista)
—	DF	BRA	Marllon (loan to Boavista)
—	DF	BRA	Gustavo (loan to Boavista)

No.	Pos.	Nation	Player
—	MF	BRA	Vinicius Pacheco (loan to Náutico)
—	MF	BRA	Erick Flores (loan to Boavista)
—	MF	BRA	Lenon (loan to Macaé)
—	FW	BRA	Guilherme Negueba (loan to São Paulo)
—	FW	POR	Liédson (loan to Porto)
—	MF	BRA	Luiz Philipe Muralha (loan to Portuguesa)

== Transfers ==
=== In ===
Note: Flags indicate national team as defined under FIFA eligibility rules; some limited exceptions apply. Players may hold more than one non-FIFA nationality.

No.	Pos.	Nation	Player
—	MF	BRA	Amaral (transfer from Nova Iguaçu)
—	DF	BRA	Alex Silva (loan return from Cruzeiro)
—	MF	BRA	Elias (loan from Sporting CP)
—	MF	BRA	Gabriel (transfer from Bahia)
—	MF	BRA	João Paulo (loan from Mogi Mirim)
—	DF	BRA	Wallace (transfer from Corinthians)
—	MF	BRA	Carlos Eduardo (loan from Rubin Kazan)
—	FW	BOL	Marcelo Moreno (loan from Grêmio)

No.	Pos.	Nation	Player
—	MF	BRA	Val (transfer from Mogi Mirim)
—	FW	BRA	Paulinho (loan from XV de Piracicaba)
—	MF	BRA	Diego Silva (loan from XV de Piracicaba)
—	MF	BRA	Val (transfer from Mogi Mirim)
—	MF	BRA	Bruninho (transfer from Atlético Sorocaba)
—	DF	BRA	André Santos (transfer from Grêmio)
—	DF	BRA	Chicão (transfer from Corinthians)
—	DF	BRA	Welinton (loan return from FC Alania Vladikavkaz)

=== Out ===
Note: Flags indicate national team as defined under FIFA eligibility rules; some limited exceptions apply. Players may hold more than one non-FIFA nationality.

No.	Pos.	Nation	Player
—	MF	CHI	Claudio Maldonado (released)
—	DF	BRA	Arthur Sanches (released)
—	DF	BRA	Welinton (loan to Alania Vladikavkaz)
—	FW	BRA	Vágner Love (transfer to CSKA Moscow)
—	MF	ARG	Darío Bottinelli (end of contract)
—	DF	BRA	Wellington Silva (loan return to Resende)
—	MF	BRA	Rômulo (transfer to Boavista)
—	MF	BRA	Wellington Bruno (loan return to Ipatinga)
—	MF	BRA	Guilherme Negueba (loan to São Paulo)
—	DF	BRA	Magal (released)
—	DF	BRA	Egídio (released)
—	MF	BRA	Lenon (loan to Macaé)
—	MF	BRA	Vinícius Pacheco (loan to Náutico)
—	DF	BRA	Everton Silva (loan to Boavista)

No.	Pos.	Nation	Player
—	DF	BRA	Gustavo (loan to Boavista)
—	DF	BRA	Erick Flores (loan to Boavista)
—	DF	BRA	Marcelo Carné (loan to Boavista)
—	FW	POR	Liédson (loan to Porto)
—	MF	BRA	Airton (loan return to S.L. Benfica)
—	DF	BRA	Alex Silva (released)
—	DF	BRA	Ibson (released)
—	DF	BRA	Renato Santos (loan to Vitória)
—	MF	BRA	Renato (released)
—	MF	BRA	Cléber Santana (released)
—	FW	BRA	Thomas (loan to A.C. Siena)
—	MF	BRA	Luiz Philipe Muralha (loan to Portuguesa)
—	DF	BRA	Ramon (loan return to Corinthians)

== Statistics ==
=== Appearances and goals ===
Last updated on July 9, 2014.

- Players in italic have left the club during the season.

No.	Pos	Nat	Player	Total		Rio State League		Copa do Brasil		Série A	
No.	Pos	Nat	Player	Apps	Goals	Apps	Goals	Apps	Goals	Apps	Goals
1	GK	(Brazil) BRA	Felipe	52	0	15	0	12	0	25	0
2	DF	(Brazil) BRA	Leonardo Moura	50	3	13	0	11	1	26	2
3	DF	(Brazil) BRA	Chicão	20	2	0	0	6	1	12+2	1
4	DF	(Chile) CHI	Marcos González	36	0	9	0	6+2	0	18+1	0
5	MF	(Paraguay) PAR	Víctor Cáceres	27	1	9	0	5	0	10+3	1
6	DF	(Brazil) BRA	Ramon	7	0	2	0	3	0	2	0
7	FW	(Brazil) BRA	Rafinha	43	3	15	2	5+2	1	8+13	0
8	MF	(Brazil) BRA	Elias	55	10	12	1	13	5	30	4
9	FW	(Brazil) BRA	Hernane	58	36	15+1	12	10+1	8	27+4	16
10	MF	(Brazil) BRA	Gabriel	44	3	4+4	1	5+2	0	22+7	2
11	MF	(Brazil) BRA	Renato Abreu	17	7	3+6	4	3+1	2	3+1	1
13	DF	(Brazil) BRA	Renato Santos	19	0	8	0	4	0	6+1	0
14	DF	(Brazil) BRA	Wallace	49	3	9	0	10	0	30	3
15	MF	(Brazil) BRA	Luiz Antônio	49	1	1+5	0	8+3	0	24+8	1
16	DF	(Brazil) BRA	João Paulo	52	3	13+1	1	5+4	0	27+2	2
17	MF	(Brazil) BRA	Adryan	22	0	1+3	0	1+3	0	3+11	0
18	MF	(Brazil) BRA	Lucas Quintino	1	0	0+1	0	0	0	0	0
19	FW	(Bolivia) BOL	Marcelo Moreno	20	4	0	0	4	2	11+5	2
20	MF	(Brazil) BRA	Carlos Eduardo	41	1	4+3	0	7+3	1	21+3	0
26	FW	(Brazil) BRA	Paulinho	44	5	0	0	8+3	1	25+8	4
27	DF	(Brazil) BRA	André Santos	28	3	0	0	8	1	20	2
28	MF	(Brazil) BRA	Bruninho	14	0	0	0	2+2	0	3+7	0
29	FW	(Brazil) BRA	Nixon	30	4	8+2	2	1+4	1	7+8	1
30	MF	(Brazil) BRA	Val	15	0	0	0	2	0	3+10	0
33	DF	(Brazil) BRA	Samir	17	0	0	0	3+1	0	11+2	0
34	DF	(Brazil) BRA	Digão	9	0	1	0	1	0	7	0
35	MF	(Brazil) BRA	Diego Silva	20	0	0	0	0+6	0	5+9	0
36	DF	(Brazil) BRA	Rodrigo Frauches	6	0	2	0	0	0	4	0
37	GK	(Brazil) BRA	César	1	0	0	0	0	0	1	0
38	DF	(Brazil) BRA	Welinton	1	0	0	0	0	0	1	0
40	MF	(Brazil) BRA	Amaral	31	1	6	0	10	1	15	0
43	MF	(Brazil) BRA	Mattheus	0	0	0	0	0	0	0	0
48	GK	(Brazil) BRA	Paulo Victor	16	0	1	0	2	0	13	0
	MF	(Brazil) BRA	Lorran	0	0	0	0	0	0	0	0
	DF	(Brazil) BRA	Felipe Dias	2	0	1+1	0	0	0	0	0
	FW	(Brazil) BRA	Romário	1	0	0+1	0	0	0	0	0
	FW	(Brazil) BRA	Igor Sartori	3	0	0+3	0	0	0	0	0
	MF	(Brazil) BRA	Rodolfo	14	1	6+4	1	1+3	0	0	0
	DF	(Brazil) BRA	Alex Silva	5	0	4+1	0	0	0	0	0
	MF	(Brazil) BRA	Ibson	13	1	11+2	1	0	0	0	0
	FW	(Brazil) BRA	Paulo Sérgio	0	0	0	0	0	0	0	0
	FW	(Brazil) BRA	Thomas	3	0	0+3	0	0	0	0	0
	MF	(Brazil) BRA	Cléber Santana	11	3	2+8	3	0+1	0	0	0

=== Top scorers ===
Includes all competitive matches

Position	Nation	Number	Name	Rio State League	Copa do Brasil	Série A	Total
1	(Brazil)	9	Hernane	12	8	16	36
2	(Brazil)	8	Elias	1	5	4	10
3	(Brazil)	11	Renato Abreu	4	2	1	7
4	(Brazil)	26	Paulinho	0	1	4	5
5	(Bolivia)	19	Marcelo Moreno	0	2	2	4
5	(Brazil)	29	Nixon	2	1	1	4
6	(Brazil)	14	Wallace	0	0	3	3
6	(Brazil)	2	Leonardo Moura	0	1	2	3
6	(Brazil)	27	André Santos	0	1	2	3
6	(Brazil)	10	Gabriel	1	0	2	3
6	(Brazil)	16	João Paulo	1	0	2	3
6	(Brazil)		Cléber Santana	3	0	0	3
7	(Brazil)	3	Chicão	0	1	1	2
8	(Paraguay)	5	Víctor Cáceres	0	0	1	1
8	(Brazil)	15	Luiz Antônio	0	0	1	1
8	(Brazil)	20	Carlos Eduardo	0	1	0	1
8	(Brazil)	40	Amaral	0	1	0	1
8	(Brazil)		Ibson	1	0	0	1
8	(Brazil)		Rodolfo	1	0	0	1
			Own Goal	0	0	0	0
			Total	35	24	41	101

=== Clean sheets ===
Includes all competitive matches

Position	Nation	Number	Name	Rio State League	Copa do Brasil	Série A	Total
GK	(Brazil)	1	Felipe	7	6	7	20
GK	(Brazil)	37	César	0	0	0	0
GK	(Brazil)	48	Paulo Victor	0	0	3	3
			Total	7	6	10	23

=== Disciplinary record ===
Position	Nation	Number	Name	Rio State League		Copa do Brasil		Série A		Total	
Position	Nation	Number	Name	Yellow card	Red card	Yellow card	Red card	Yellow card	Red card	Yellow card	Red card
GK	(Brazil)	1	Felipe	0	0	0	0	1	1	1	1
DF	(Brazil)	2	Leonardo Moura	1	0	2	0	3	0	6	0
DF	(Brazil)	3	Chicão	0	0	2	0	3	0	5	0
DF	(Chile)	4	Marcos González	1	0	1	0	1	0	3	0
MF	(Paraguay)	5	Víctor Cáceres	3	0	1	0	5	0	9	0
DF	(Brazil)	6	Ramon	2	1	0	0	0	0	2	1
FW	(Brazil)	7	Rafinha	2	0	0	0	2	0	4	0
MF	(Brazil)	8	Elias	2	0	0	0	2	0	4	0
FW	(Brazil)	9	Hernane	2	0	1	0	5	0	8	0
MF	(Brazil)	10	Gabriel	1	0	0	0	1	0	2	0
MF	(Brazil)	11	Renato Abreu	3	0	0	0	3	1	6	1
DF	(Brazil)	13	Renato Santos	1	0	2	0	1	0	4	0
DF	(Brazil)	14	Wallace	0	0	0	0	6	0	6	0
MF	(Brazil)	15	Luiz Antônio	1	0	2	0	7	0	10	0
MF	(Brazil)	16	João Paulo	1	0	0	0	2	0	3	0
MF	(Brazil)	17	Adryan	1	0	1	0	1	0	3	0
MF	(Brazil)	18	Lucas Quintino	0	0	0	0	0	0	0	0
FW	(Bolivia)	19	Marcelo Moreno	0	0	0	0	1	0	1	0
MF	(Brazil)	20	Carlos Eduardo	0	0	1	0	3	0	4	0
FW	(Brazil)	26	Paulinho	0	0	0	0	0	0	0	0
DF	(Brazil)	27	André Santos	0	0	2	0	5	0	7	0
MF	(Brazil)	28	Bruninho	0	0	0	0	1	0	1	0
DF	(Brazil)	29	Nixon	0	0	0	0	1	0	1	0
MF	(Brazil)	30	Val	0	0	1	0	0	0	0	0
DF	(Brazil)	33	Samir	0	0	1	0	3	0	4	0
MF	(Brazil)	34	Digão	0	0	1	0	0	0	1	0
MF	(Brazil)	35	Diego Silva	0	0	0	0	1	0	1	0
MF	(Brazil)	36	Rodrigo Frauches	0	0	0	0	1	0	1	0
GK	(Brazil)	37	César	0	0	0	0	0	0	0	0
DF	(Brazil)	38	Welinton	1	0	0	0	0	0	1	0
MF	(Brazil)	40	Amaral	0	0	0	0	4	0	4	0
MF	(Brazil)	43	Mattheus	0	0	0	0	0	0	0	0
GK	(Brazil)	48	Paulo Victor	0	0	0	0	1	0	1	0
DF	(Brazil)		Felipe Dias	1	0	0	0	0	0	1	0
FW	(Brazil)		Romário	0	0	0	0	0	0	0	0
FW	(Brazil)		Igor Sartori	0	0	0	0	0	0	0	0
MF	(Brazil)		Rodolfo	4	0	1	0	0	0	4	0
DF	(Brazil)		Alex Silva	3	0	0	0	0	0	3	0
MF	(Brazil)		Ibson	2	0	0	0	0	0	2	0
MF	(Brazil)		Thomas	1	0	0	0	0	0	1	0
MF	(Brazil)		Cléber Santana	2	0	0	0	0	0	2	0
			Total	35	1	19	0	64	2	118	3

=== Overview ===
Competition	First match	Last match	Starting round	Final position	Record							
Competition	First match	Last match	Starting round	Final position	Pld	W	D	L	GF	GA	GD	Win %
Série A	26 May 2013	7 December 2013	Matchday 1	16th	38	12	13	13	43	46	−3	31.58
Copa do Brasil	3 April 2013	27 November 2013	Round of 16	Winners	14	11	2	1	26	14	+12	78.57
Campeonato Carioca	26 January 2013	13 April 2013	Matchday 1	Runners-up	16	10	3	3	28	14	+14	62.50
Total					68	33	18	17	97	74	+23	48.53

Source: Competitions

== Competitions ==
=== Campeonato Carioca ===
==== Taça Guanabara ====
Group B
Pos	Team	Pld	W	D	L	GF	GA	GD	Pts	Qualification or relegation
1	Flamengo	8	7	1	0	16	3	+13	22	Advanced to the Semifinals
2	Fluminense	8	4	4	0	17	8	+9	16	Advanced to the Semifinals
3	Bangu	8	4	2	2	9	5	+4	14	
4	Boavista	8	4	2	2	8	8	0	14	
5	Audax Rio	8	3	3	2	7	10	−3	12	
6	Macaé	8	2	2	4	11	15	−4	8	
7	Resende	8	1	5	2	13	15	−2	8	
8	Duque de Caxias	8	1	2	5	6	13	−7	5	

Updated to match(es) played on 24 February 2013. Source: www.socerway.com
Rules for classification: 1st points; 2nd wins; 3rd goal difference; 4th goals scored; 5th red cards received; 6th yellow cards received; 7th draw.

===== Matches =====
19 January 1	Flamengo	2–0	Quissamã	Rio de Janeiro
17:00 UTC−03:00	Hernane 4' 85'; Ramon (yellow card) 17' (yellow-red card) 89'			Stadium: Estádio Olímpico João Havelange (Engenhão); Attendance: 9.839; Referee: Leonardo De Castro Moreira

23 January 2	Madureira	1–1	Flamengo	Rio de Janeiro
16:30 UTC−03:00	Rodrigo 52' (pen.); Diego Renan (yellow card) 22'		44' Ibson; (yellow card) 52' Felipe Dias; (yellow card) 86' Rafinha	Stadium: Estádio Conselheiro Galvão; Attendance: 2.680; Referee: Marcelo de Lima Henrique

27 January 3	Flamengo	1–0	Volta Redonda	Rio de Janeiro
17:00 UTC−03:00	Hernane 90+3'; Renato Santos (yellow card) 30'		(yellow card) 11' Dudu; (yellow card) 42' Frontini; (yellow card) 53' Jancarlos	Stadium: Estádio Moça Bonita; Attendance: 3.743; Referee: Rodrigo Nunes de Sá

31 January 4	Vasco da Gama	2–4	Flamengo	Rio de Janeiro
19:30 UTC−03:00	Pedro Ken 32'; Dakson 72'; Éder Luís (yellow card) 18'; Jhon Cley (yellow card) 19'		24' Hernane; 30' Nixon; 48' Cléber Santana; 64' Rafinha; (yellow card) 18' Elias; (yellow card) 45+1' Hernane; (yellow card) 56' Leonardo Moura; (yellow card) 87' Thomas	Stadium: Estádio Olímpico João Havelange (Engenhão); Attendance: 15.669; Referee: Wagner do Nascimento Magalhães

3 February 5	Flamengo	1–0	Nova Iguaçu	Rio de Janeiro
17:00 UTC−03:00	Hernane 67'; João Paulo (yellow card) 80'		(yellow card) 23' Uallace	Stadium: Estádio Olímpico João Havelange (Engenhão); Attendance: 8.155; Referee: João Ennio Sobral

6 February 6	Friburguense	0–4	Flamengo	Macaé
22:00 UTC−03:00	Sérgio Gomes (yellow card) 59'		6' 12' Hernane; 53' Rafinha; 61' Cléber Santana; (yellow card) 37' Hernane; (yellow card) 82' Rafinha	Stadium: Estádio Cláudio Moacyr; Attendance: 9.236; Referee: Rodrigo Carvalhaes de Miranda

17 February 7	Flamengo	1–0	Botafogo	Rio de Janeiro
18:30 UTC−03:00	Hernane 3'; Ibson (yellow card) 65'; Cáceres (yellow card) 81'; Elias (yellow card) 82'	Report	(yellow card) 18' Lodeiro; (yellow card) 82' Cidinho	Stadium: Estádio Olímpico João Havelange (Engenhão); Attendance: 25.359; Referee: Rodrigo Nunes de Sá

23 February 8	Olaria	0–2	Flamengo	Volta Redonda
16:00 UTC−03:00	Rafael (yellow card) 59'; Leandão (yellow card) 65'; Waldir (yellow card) 68'; Assis (yellow card) 78'	Report	21', 24', (yellow card) 87' Renato Abreu; (yellow card) 75' Alex Silva; (yellow card) 85' Cáceres	Stadium: Estádio Raulino de Oliveira; Attendance: 6.653; Referee: Philip George Bennett

===== Knockout stage =====
3 March Semifinal	Flamengo	0–2	Botafogo	Rio de Janeiro
16:00 UTC−03:00	González (yellow card) 19'; Renato Abreu (yellow card) 57'; Ibson (yellow card) 59'; Gabriel (yellow card) 90+1'	Report	1' Júlio César; 90+3' Vitinho; (yellow card) 8' Dória; (yellow card) 49' Lucas; (yellow card) 54' Lodeiro; (yellow card) 83' Jefferson; (yellow card) 88' Gabriel; (yellow card) 90' André Bahia	Stadium: Estádio Olímpico João Havelange (Engenhão); Attendance: 21.545; Referee: Graziani Maciel Rocha

==== Taça Rio ====
Group B
Pos	Team	Pld	W	D	L	GF	GA	GD	Pts	Qualification or relegation
1	Fluminense	7	5	1	1	11	4	+7	16	Advanced to the Semifinals
2	Resende	7	5	0	2	13	10	+3	15	Advanced to the Semifinals
3	Flamengo	7	3	2	2	12	9	+3	11	
4	Audax Rio	7	3	1	3	7	7	0	10	
5	Duque de Caxias	7	2	3	2	9	9	0	9	
6	Boavista	7	2	2	3	9	11	−2	8	
7	Macaé	7	2	0	5	8	14	−6	6	
8	Bangu	7	0	3	4	5	10	−5	3	

Updated to match(es) played on 21 April 2013. Source: www.socerway.com
Rules for classification: 1st points; 2 wins; 3 goal difference; 4 goals scored; 5 red cards received; 6 yellow cards received; 7 draw.

===== Matches =====
13 March 1	Flamengo	2–3	Resende	Rio de Janeiro
22:00 UTC−03:00	Hernane 23'; Elias 30'; Rodolfo (yellow card) 58'; Cáceres (yellow card) 73'	Report	49' Robert; 60' Elias; 67', (yellow card) 84' Dudu; (yellow card) 27' Denilson; (yellow card) 79' Filipi Souza; (yellow card) 89' Mauro	Stadium: Estádio Olímpico João Havelange (Engenhão); Attendance: 1.764; Referee: Maurício Machado Coelho Júnior

23 March 2	Boavista	0–0	Flamengo	Rio de Janeiro
18:30 UTC−03:00	Léo Faria (yellow card) 28'; Tony (yellow card) 44'	Report	(yellow card) 81' Alex Silva	Stadium: Estádio Olímpico João Havelange (Engenhão); Attendance: 6.203; Referee: Péricles Bassols

27 March 3	Bangu	1–2	Flamengo	Volta Redonda
22:00 UTC−03:00	Sergio Júnior 3'; Celsinho (yellow card) 76'; Getúlio Vargas (yellow card) 88'; Ives (yellow card) 90'	Report	66', (yellow card) 81' Rodolfo; 85' João Paulo; (yellow card) 36' Luiz Antônio; (yellow card) 63' Renato Abreu	Stadium: Estádio Raulino de Oliveira; Attendance: 1.666; Referee: Wagner do Nascimento Magalhães

31 March 4	Flamengo	1–2	Audax Rio	Volta Redonda
16:00 UTC−03:00	Gabriel 53'; Rodolfo (yellow card) 55'; Alex Silva (yellow card) 70'	Report	3', (yellow card) 80' André Castro; 90' Hyuri; (yellow card) 84' Romário	Stadium: Estádio Raulino de Oliveira; Attendance: 3.120; Referee: Eduardo Cordeiro Guimarães

6 April 5	Flamengo	1–1	Duque de Caxias	Macaé
16:00 UTC−03:00	Cléber Santana 90+1'; Elias (yellow card) 29'	Report	30', (yellow card) 84' Charles Chad; (yellow card) 33' Leandro Cruz; (yellow card) 84' Sagaz	Stadium: Estádio Cláudio Moacyr; Attendance: 1.756; Referee: Pathrice Maia

14 April 6	Flamengo	3–1	Fluminense	Volta Redonda
18:30 UTC−03:00	Hernane 8'; Renato Abreu 44' 47'; Elias (yellow card) 55'	Report	Rafael Sóbis 66'; Gum (yellow card) 40'; Carlinhos (yellow card) 43'; Digão (yellow card) 84'; Rhayner (yellow card) 45'	Stadium: Estádio Raulino de Oliveira; Attendance: 5.973; Referee: Marcelo de Lima Henrique

21 April 7	Macaé	1–3	Flamengo	Macaé
16:00 UTC−03:00	Marcos Goiano 7'; Edson (yellow card) 27'; Diego Macedo (yellow card) 45'; Rodrigo Fernandes (yellow card) 76'	Report	Hernane 47' 61'; Nixon 59'; Adryan (yellow card) 20'; Rodolfo (yellow card) 57'	Stadium: Estádio Cláudio Moacyr; Attendance: 2.926; Referee: Joao Batista de Arruda

=== Copa do Brasil ===
==== First round ====
3 April First leg	Remo (Pará)	0–1	(Rio de Janeiro (state)) Flamengo	Belém
22:00 (UTC−03:00)	Zé Antônio (yellow card) 52'; Val Barreto (yellow card) 64'	(Report)	54' Rafinha; (yellow card) 32' Rodolfo; (yellow card) 73' Renato Santos	Stadium: Estádio Olímpico do Pará (Mangueirão); Referee: Raphael Claus

17 April Second leg	Flamengo (Rio de Janeiro (state))	3–0 (4–0 agg.)	(Pará) Remo	Volta Redonda
22:00 (UTC−03:00)	Hernane 36' 50' 71'	Report	Carlinho Rech (yellow card) 14'; Nata (yellow card) 32' (yellow-red card) 81'; Henrique (yellow card) 81'	Stadium: Estádio Raulino de Oliveira; Attendance: 3.614; Referee: Wagner Reway

==== Second round ====
1 May First leg	Campinense (Paraíba)	1–2	(Rio de Janeiro (state)) Flamengo	Campina Grande
21:50 (UTC−03:00)	Jeferson Maranhense 8'; Bismarck (yellow card) 53'; Edvanio (yellow card) 58'; Rodrigo César (yellow card) 72'	Report	Renato Abreu 28' 60'; Elias (yellow card) 50'	Stadium: Amigão; Attendance: 16.580; Referee: Dewson Fernando Freitas da Silva

15 May Second leg	Flamengo (Rio de Janeiro (state))	2–1 (4–1 agg.)	(Paraíba) Campinense	Volta Redonda
22:00 (UTC−03:00)	Roberto 6' (o.g.); Elias 78'; Renato Santos (yellow card) 38'	Report	Bismarck 6'; Danilo Portugal (yellow card) 27'; Alberto (yellow card) 67'; Jeferson Maranhense (yellow card) 73'	Stadium: Estádio Raulino de Oliveira; Attendance: 19.286; Referee: Cleisson Veloso Pereira

==== Third round ====
11 July First leg	ASA (Alagoas)	0–2	(Rio de Janeiro (state)) Flamengo	Arapiraca
21:50 (UTC−03:00)	Edson Veneno (yellow card) 24'; Léo Gamalho (yellow card) 59'; Osmar (yellow card) 68'; Chiquinho (yellow card) 77'		Marcelo Moreno 63'; Nixon 73'; Adryan (yellow card) 29'; Marcos Gonzalez (yellow card) 59'	Stadium: Estádio Fumeirão; Attendance: 3.648; Referee: Leandro Bizzio

18 July Second leg	Flamengo (Rio de Janeiro (state))	2–1 (4–1 agg.)	(Alagoas) ASA	Volta Redonda
22:00 (UTC−03:00)	Elias 43'; Marcelo Moreno 81'; Val (yellow card) 38'; Digão (yellow card) 62'		Osmar 57'; Chiquinho (yellow card) 33'; Fabiano (yellow card) 53'	Stadium: Estádio Raulino de Oliveira; Attendance: 3.116; Referee: Anderson Daronco

==== Round of 16 ====
21 August First leg	Cruzeiro (Minas Gerais)	2–1	(Rio de Janeiro (state)) Flamengo	Belo Horizonte
21:50 UTC−03:00	Willian 28'; Everton Ribeiro 57'	Report	Carlos Eduardo 69'; Víctor Cáceres (yellow card) 77'; Elias (yellow card) 85'	Stadium: Mineirão; Attendance: 33.645; Referee: Marcelo Aparecido de Souza

28 August Second leg	Flamengo (Rio de Janeiro (state))	1–0 (2a–2 agg.)	(Minas Gerais) Cruzeiro	Rio de Janeiro
21:50 UTC−03:00	Elias 88'; Elias (yellow card) 39'; André Santos (yellow card) 64'; Chicão (yellow card) 89'	Report	Nilton (yellow card) 39'; Everton Ribeiro (yellow card) 45+1'; Willian (yellow card) 78'; Dedé (yellow card) 89'	Stadium: Estádio do Maracanã; Attendance: 53.538; Referee: Jaílson Macedo Freitas

==== Quarterfinals ====
25 September First leg	Botafogo (Rio de Janeiro (state))	1–1	(Rio de Janeiro (state)) Flamengo	Rio de Janeiro
21:50 UTC−03:00	Edílson 58'; Júlio César (yellow card) 41'; Edílson (yellow card) 60'	Report	André Santos 13'; André Santos (yellow card) 30'	Stadium: Estádio do Maracanã; Attendance: 34.319; Referee: Wagner do Nascimento Magalhães

23 October Second leg	Flamengo (Rio de Janeiro (state))	4–0 (5–1 agg.)	(Rio de Janeiro (state)) Botafogo	Rio de Janeiro
21:50 UTC−02:00	Hernane 20', 33', 58'; Léo Moura 72' (pen.); Hernane (yellow card) 41'; Elias (yellow card) 54'	Report	Dória (yellow card) 35' (yellow-red card) 70'	Stadium: Estádio do Maracanã; Attendance: 59.848; Referee: Paulo César de Oliveira

==== Semifinals ====
30 October First leg	Goiás	1–2	(Rio de Janeiro (state)) Flamengo	Goiânia
21:50 UTC−02:00	Vítor 39'; Hugo (yellow card) 70'	Report	Paulinho 26'; Chicão 42'; Chicão (yellow card) 70'	Stadium: Estádio Serra Dourada; Attendance: 35.112; Referee: Wilson Seneme

6 November Second leg	Flamengo (Rio de Janeiro (state))	2–1 (4–2 agg.)	Goiás	Rio de Janeiro
21:50 UTC−02:00	Hernane 14'; Elias 24'; Carlos Eduardo (yellow card) 56'; Léo Moura (yellow card) 68'; Luiz Antônio (yellow card) 71'	Report	Eduardo Sasha 5'	Stadium: Estádio do Maracanã; Attendance: 56.224; Referee: Leandro Vuaden

==== Final ====
20 November First leg	Atlético Paranaense (Paraná (state))	1–1	(Rio de Janeiro (state)) Flamengo	Curitiba
21:50 UTC−02:00	Marcelo 18'; Pedro Botelho (yellow card) 24'; Éverton (yellow card) 74'	Report	Amaral 31'; Léo Moura (yellow card) 17'; Elias (yellow card) 80'	Stadium: Estádio Vila Capanema; Attendance: 15.484; Referee: Paulo César de Oliveira

27 November Second leg	Flamengo (Rio de Janeiro (state))	2–0 (3–1 agg.)	(Paraná (state)) Atlético Paranaense	Rio de Janeiro
21:50 UTC−02:00	Elias 88'; Hernane 90+5'; Samir (yellow card) 76'; André Santos (red card) 89'	Report	Delatorre (yellow card) 76'; Ciro (red card) 89'	Stadium: Estádio do Maracanã; Attendance: 68.857; Referee: Leandro Vuaden

=== Série A ===
==== League table ====
Pos	Team	Pld	W	D	L	GF	GA	GD	Pts	Qualification or relegation
14	Criciúma	38	13	7	18	49	63	−14	46	
15	Fluminense	38	12	10	16	43	47	−4	46	
16	Flamengo	38	12	13	13	43	46	−3	45 (Note: Flamengo and Portuguesa were punished for selecting suspended players in Round 38. Each club lost 4 points.)	2014 Copa Libertadores Second Stage (Note: Atlético Mineiro is qualified for the second stage of the 2014 Copa Libertadores as the 2013 Copa Libertadores champion. Flamengo is qualified for the second stage of the 2014 Copa Libertadores as the 2013 Copa do Brasil champion.)
17	Portuguesa (R)	38	12	12	14	50	46	+4	44	Relegation to Série B
18	Vasco da Gama (R)	38	11	11	16	50	61	−11	44	Relegation to Série B

Updated to match(es) played on unknown. Source: Soccerway.com
Rules for classification: 1st points; 2nd wins; 3rd goal difference; 4th goals scored; 5th head-to-head results; 6th least red cards received; 7th least yellow cards received; 8th draw.
(R) Relegated

==== Matches ====
26 May 1	Santos	0–0	Flamengo	Brasília
16:00 UTC−03:00	Henrique (yellow card) 37'	Report	Luiz Antônio (yellow card) 62'	Stadium: Estádio Nacional de Brasília; Attendance: 63.501; Referee: Wilton Pereira Sampaio

29 May 2	Flamengo	0–2	Ponte Preta	Juiz de Fora
21:00 UTC−03:00		Report	William 26'; Cicinho 74'; Roger Gaúcho (yellow card) 73'	Stadium: Estádio Municipal Radialista Mário Helênio; Attendance: 8.932; Referee: Jean Pierre Goncalves Lima

1 June 3	Atlético Paranaense	2–2	Flamengo	Joinville
16:20 UTC−03:00	Éderson 32' 72'; Jonas (yellow card) 48'	Report	Moreno 78'; Renato Abreu 81' (yellow card) 81'; João Paulo (yellow card) 35'; Moura (yellow card) 43'; Luiz Antônio (yellow card) 60'	Stadium: Arena Joinville; Attendance: 8.986; Referee: Leandro Pedro Vuaden

5 June 4	Flamengo	0–1	Náutico	Florianópolis
22:00 UTC−03:00	Renato Abreu (yellow card) 80' (yellow-red card) 86'	Report	Rogério 82'; Josa (yellow card) 45+1'; Luiz Eduardo (yellow card) 85'	Stadium: Estádio Orlando Scarpelli; Referee: André Luiz de Freitas Castro

8 June 5	Criciúma	0–3	Flamengo	Criciúma
16:00 UTC−03:00	Fabinho (red card) 18'	Report	Hernane 38'; Gabriel 53' 79'; Diego Silva (yellow card) 51'; Adryan (yellow card) 76'	Stadium: Estádio Heriberto Hülse; Attendance: 17.785; Referee: Jailson Macêdo Freitas

6 July 6	Flamengo	2–2	Coritiba	Brasília
18:30 UTC−03:00	Marcelo Moreno 9'; Víctor Cáceres 48' (yellow card) 54'		Chico 53'; Alex 60'; Leandro Almeida (yellow card) 34'; Darío Bottinelli (yellow card) 51'; Diogo Goiano (yellow card) 71'	Stadium: Estádio Nacional de Brasília; Referee: Paulo César de Oliveira

14 July 7	Vasco da Gama	0–1	Flamengo	Brasília
16:00 UTC−03:00	Sandro Silva (yellow card) 21'; Wendel (yellow card) 37'; Nei (yellow card) 61'; Rafael Vaz (yellow card) 90+1'		Paulinho 30'; Víctor Cáceres (yellow card) 36'	Stadium: Estádio Nacional de Brasília; Attendance: 61.767; Referee: Paulo César de Oliveira

21 July 8	Internacional	1–0	Flamengo	Caxias do Sul
16:00 UTC−03:00	Juan 90'		Léo Moura (yellow card) 84'	Stadium: Estádio Centenário; Referee: Guilherme Cereta Lima

15 July 9	Flamengo	1–1	Botafogo	Rio de Janeiro
16:00 UTC−03:00	Elias 90+5' (yellow card) 90+5'		Rafael Marques 22'; Gabriel (yellow card) 48'; Gilberto Júnior (yellow card) 70'	Stadium: Estádio do Maracanã; Attendance: 38.853; Referee: Pericles Bassols Pegado Cortez

1 August 10	Bahia	3–0	Flamengo	Salvador
21:50 UTC−03:00	Fernandão 29'; Wallyson 45+2'; Marquinhos Gabriel 77'		Felipe (yellow card) 45+3'	Stadium: Arena Fonte Nova; Referee: Héber Roberto Lopes

4 August 11	Flamengo	3–0	Atlético Mineiro	Brasília
16:00 UTC−03:00	Nixon 8'; Elias 14'; Paulinho 75'		Alecsandro (yellow card) 90+2'	Stadium: Estádio Nacional de Brasília; Referee: Leandro Pedro Vuaden

8 August 12	Flamengo	1–1	Portuguesa	Brasília
19:30 UTC−03:00	João Paulo 68' (pen.); Víctor Cáceres (yellow card) 60'		Lauro 90+2'; Gilberto (yellow card) 19'; Rogério (yellow card) 47'; Bruno Henrique (yellow card) 49'; Ferdinando (yellow card) 66' (yellow-red card) 87'	Stadium: Estádio Nacional de Brasília; Referee: Cleisson Veloso Pereira

11 August 13	Fluminense	2–3	Flamengo	Rio de Janeiro
18:30 UTC−03:00	Rafael Sóbis 17' 90+3'; Carlinhos (yellow card) 5'; Leandro Euzébio (yellow card) 37'; Fred (yellow card) 82'		Hernane 32' 80'; Elias 26'; Marcos González (yellow card) 37'; Elias (yellow card) 45'	Stadium: Estádio do Maracanã; Attendance: 38.715; Referee: Luiz Flávio de Oliveira

15 August 14	Goiás	1–1	Flamengo	Goiânia
21:50 UTC−03:00	Walter 15'; David (yellow card) 82'		Chicão 15'; Hernane (yellow card) 81'	Stadium: Estádio Serra Dourada; Attendance: 32.049; Referee: Jaílson Macedo Freitas

8 August 15	Flamengo	0–0	São Paulo	Brasília
16:00 UTC−03:00	Nixon (yellow card) 45'; Luiz Antônio (yellow card) 87'		Jádson (yellow card) 24'; Aloísio (yellow card) 32'; Douglas (yellow card) 89'	Stadium: Estádio Nacional de Brasília; Attendance: 44.164; Referee: Ricardo Marques Ribeiro

24 August 16	Flamengo	0–1	Grêmio	Brasília
18:30 UTC−03:00	Marcelo Moreno (yellow card) 46'; Hernane (yellow card) 90+1'		Pará 8'; Alex Telles (yellow card) 42'; Kleber (yellow card) 61'	Stadium: Estádio Nacional de Brasília; Referee: Paulo Henrique de Godoy Bezerra

1 September 17	Corinthians	4–0	Flamengo	São Paulo
16:00 UTC−03:00	Alexandre Pato 25' 35'; Romarinho 75' (yellow card) 75'; Paolo Guerrero 84' (pen.); Ralf (yellow card) 27'; Felipe (yellow card) 66'		Rafinha (yellow card) 36'; João Paulo (yellow card) 83'	Stadium: Estádio do Pacaembu; Referee: Wilton Pereira Sampaio

4 September 18	Flamengo	2–1	Vitória	Rio de Janeiro
19:30 UTC−03:00	Hernane 23' 44' (yellow card) 90+1'; André Santos (yellow card) 85'		Juan 90+2' (yellow card) 90+3'; Maxi Biancucchi (yellow card) 72'; Victor Ramos (yellow card) 90+3'	Stadium: Estádio do MAracanã; Referee: Luiz Flávio de Oliveira

8 September 19	Cruzeiro	1–0	Flamengo	Belo Horizonte
16:00 UTC−03:00	Ricardo Goulart 54' (yellow card) 48'; Egídio (yellow card) 36'; Lucas Silva (yellow card) 76'		Víctor Cáceres (yellow card) 50'; Bruninho (yellow card) 82'	Stadium: Estádio do Mineirão; Attendance: 35.628; Referee: Anderson Daronco

12 September 20	Flamengo	2–1	Santos	Rio de Janeiro
21:00 UTC−03:00	Léo Moura 19'; Hernane 55'; Samir (yellow card) 56'; Carlos Eduardo (yellow card) 37'; Elias (yellow card) 90'		Cícero 57' (pen.); Gabriel (yellow card) 70'; Willian José (yellow card) 90+2'; Cicinho (yellow card) 90+3'	Stadium: Estádio do Maracanã; Referee: Sandro Meira Ricci

15 September 21	Ponte Preta	1–1	Flamengo	Campinas
16:00 UTC−03:00	Artur 68'; Fellipe Bastos (yellow card) 38'; Chiquinho (yellow card) 88'; César (red card)		André Santos 87'; Samir (yellow card) 36' (yellow-red card) 65'	Stadium: Estádio Moisés Lucarelli; Attendance: 10.346; Referee: Paulo Henrique de Godoy Bezerra

19 September 22	Flamengo	2–4	Atlético Paranaense	Rio de Janeiro
19:30 UTC−03:00				Stadium: Estádio do Maracanã

22 September 23	Náutico	0–0	Flamengo	Recife
16:00 UTC−03:00				Stadium: Arena Pernambuco

29 September 24	Flamengo	4–1	Criciúma	Rio de Janeiro
16:00 UTC−03:00				Stadium: Estádio do Maracanã

2 October 25	Coritiba	0–2	Flamengo	Curitiba
21:50 UTC−03:00	Germano (yellow card) 13' (yellow-red card) 83'; Bill (yellow card) 38'		André Santos 45+2'; Wallace 50'; Chicão (yellow card) 54'	Stadium: Estádio Couto Pereira; Referee: Paulo César de Oliveira

6 October 26	Flamengo	1–1	Vasco da Gama	Brasília
16:00 UTC−03:00	Hernane 33'; Wallace (yellow card) 16'; André Santos (yellow card) 50'		Willie 53'; Juninho Pernambucano (yellow card) 28'; Jhon Cley (yellow card) 66'; Yoshimar Yotun (yellow card) 86'	Stadium: Estádio Nacional de Brasília; Referee: Ricardo Marques Ribeiro

10 October 27	Flamengo	2–1	Internacional	Rio de Janeiro
21:00 UTC−03:00	Léo Moura 29'; Hernane 72'; Chicão (yellow card) 54'		Rafael Moura 82'; Willians (yellow card) 53'; Jackson Souza (yellow card) 67'	Stadium: Estádio do Maracanã; Referee: Raphael Claus

13 October 28	Botafogo	2–1	Flamengo	Rio de Janeiro
18:30 UTC−03:00	Gegê 42'; Rafael Marques 63'; Edilson (yellow card) 45+1'; Júlio César (yellow card) 89'		Hernane 13'; Amaral (yellow card) 80'	Stadium: Estádio do Maracanã; Referee: Grazianni Maciel Rocha

16 October 29	Flamengo	2–1	Bahia	Rio de Janeiro
21:50 UTC−03:00	Paulinho 61'; Hernane 85'; André Santos (yellow card) 21'; Chicão (yellow card) 44'; Gabriel (yellow card) 48'		Fernandão 79'; Lucas Fonseca (yellow card) 22'; Rafael Miranda (yellow card) 45+1'; Souza (yellow card) 88'	Stadium: Estádio do Maracanã; Referee: Wilton Pereira Sampaio

20 October 30	Atlético Mineiro	1–0	Flamengo	Belo Horizonte
16:00 UTC−03:00	Lucas Cândido 57'; Leonardo Silva (yellow card) 8'; Neto Berola (yellow card) 22'; Emerson (yellow card) 81'		Carlos Eduardo (yellow card) 86'	Stadium: Estádio Independência; Referee: Leandro Pedro Vuaden

27 October 31	Portuguesa	0–0	Flamengo	Fortaleza
16:00 UTC−03:00	Lima (yellow card) 49'; Souza (yellow card) 72'; Bryan Garcia (yellow card) 76'; Héverton (yellow card) 90+3'		Luiz Antônio (yellow card) 57'	Stadium: Estádio do Castelão; Referee: Anderson Daronco

3 November 32	Flamengo	1–0	Fluminense	Rio de Janeiro
18:30 UTC−03:00	Gum 71' (o.g.); Rafinha (yellow card) 38'		Edinho (yellow card) 28'	Stadium: Estádio do Maracanã; Referee: Leandro Pedro Vuaden

9 November 33	Flamengo	1–1	Goiás	Rio de Janeiro
18:00 UTC−03:00	Hernane 51'; Amaral (yellow card) 30'; André Santos (yellow card) 90+3'		Rodrigo 63'; Amaral (yellow card) 22'; Hugo (yellow card) 27' (yellow-red card) 33'	Stadium: Estádio do Maracanã; Referee: Jaílson Macedo Freitas

13 November 34	São Paulo	2–0	Flamengo	Itu
21:50 UTC−03:00	Rogério Ceni 49' (pen.); Ademilson 63'; Ademilson (yellow card) 42'; Antônio Carlos (yellow card) 45+3'; Luís Fabiano (yellow card) 78'; Paulo Miranda (yellow card) 84'; Denilson (yellow card) 87'		Amaral (yellow card) 29'; André Santos (yellow card) 40'; Elias (yellow card) 48'	Stadium: Estádio Novelli Júnior; Referee: Alicio Pena Júnior

17 November 35	Grêmio	2–1	Flamengo	Porto Alegre
18:30 UTC−03:00	Maxi Rodríguez 61' 88'; Kléber (yellow card) 66'; Maxi Rodríguez (yellow card) 89'		João Paulo 86'; Rodrigo Frauches (yellow card) 74'; Luiz Antônio (yellow card) 84'	Stadium: Arena do Grêmio; Referee: Héber Roberto Lopes

24 November 36	Flamengo	1–0	Corinthians	Rio de Janeiro
16:00 UTC−03:00	Paulinho 19'; Wallace (yellow card) 35'; Elias (yellow card) 38'			Stadium: Estádio do Maracanã; Referee: Fabrício Neves Corrêa

1 December 37	Vitória	4–2	Flamengo	Salvador
16:00 UTC−03:00	Dinei 34' 34'; Maxi Biancucchi 47'; Marquinhos 80'; Damián Escudero (yellow card) 58'; Victor Ramos (yellow card) 58'		Wallace 45+1'; Hernane 60'; Paulo Victor (yellow card) 11'; Wallace (yellow card) 36' (yellow-red card) 89'; Amaral (yellow card) 50'	Stadium: Barradão; Referee: Paulo César de Oliveira

7 December 38	Flamengo	1–1	Cruzeiro	Rio de Janeiro
16:00 UTC−03:00	Hernane 14'; Léo Moura (yellow card) 24'; Luiz Antônio (yellow card) 38'; Carlos Eduardo (red card)		Souza 64'; Vinícius Araújo (yellow card) 19'; Luan (yellow card) 38'; Everton (red card); Bruno Rodrigo (yellow card) 44'; Júlio Baptista (yellow card) 87'	Stadium: Estádio do Maracanã; Referee: Paulo Henrique de Godoy Bezerra

== Honors ==
=== Individuals ===
Name	Number	Country	Award
Hernane	9	(Brazil)	Rio State League Top Scorer
Hernane	9	(Brazil)	Copa do Brasil Top Scorer
Hernane	9	(Brazil)	Golden Boot Revista Placar
Elias	8	(Brazil)	Bola de Prata Midfielder
