= Paulinho (footballer, born June 1988) =

Brazilian footballer

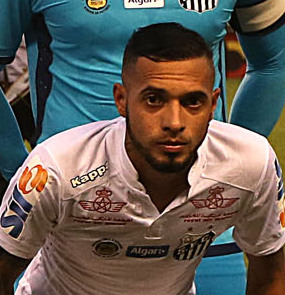
- Paulinho with Santos in 2016

Personal information
- Full name: Paulo Luiz Beraldo Santos
- Date of birth: 14 June 1988 (age 38)
- Place of birth: Guarulhos, Brazil
- Height: 1.77 m (5 ft 9 1/2 in)
- Position: Forward

Team information
- Current team: Anápolis

Youth career
- 1996–2006: Vasco da Vila Galvão
- 2006: Flamengo-SP

Senior career*
Years	Team	Apps	(Gls)
2007–2009	Flamengo-SP	44	(21)
2009–2014	XV de Piracicaba	70	(16)
2013–2014	→ Flamengo (loan)	33	(4)
2014–2017	Flamengo	38	(5)
2016	→ Santos (loan)	11	(2)
2017	→ Vitória (loan)	8	(0)
2017	→ Guarani (loan)	7	(0)
2018	Gyeongnam	23	(2)
2019	Náutico	2	(0)
2020–	Anápolis	0	(0)
- * Club domestic league appearances and goals as of 20:51, 23 July 2020 (UTC)

Paulo Luiz Beraldo Santos (born 14 June 1988), commonly known as Paulinho, is a Brazilian footballer who plays for Anápolis. Mainly a forward, he can also appear as a winger or an attacking midfielder.

== Club career ==
=== Early career ===
Born in Guarulhos, São Paulo, Paulinho joined hometown club Flamengo's youth setup in 2006, after starting it out at amateurs Vasco da Gama de Vila Galvão. In 2008, after impressing with the first team, he was linked to a move to São Paulo, but it did not materialize.

In 2009, Paulinho kept performing well for Flamengo de Guarulhos and scored 4 goals in Campeonato Paulista Série A2. After failed trials at Corinthians, Paulinho moved to XV de Piracicaba. With the club he experienced two promotions, and was also the top scorer of 2011 Copa Paulista.

On 13 July 2012, Paulinho was loaned to PFC Ludogorets Razgrad for six months. Four days later, however, he left the club after alleging 'personal reasons'.

=== Flamengo ===
On 7 May 2013, after impressing in the year's Campeonato Paulista, Paulinho signed for Série A side Flamengo along with XV teammate Diego Silva. He made his Série A debut on 26 May, coming on as a late substitute for Gabriel in a 0–0 away draw against Santos.

Paulinho scored his first top flight goal on 14 July 2013, netting the game's only in an away success at fierce rivals Vasco da Gama. He finished the season with 33 appearances and four goals, overtaking Marcelo Moreno as a first-choice along with Hernane.

On 7 April 2014, Paulinho signed a new four-year deal with Fla, who paid R$1 million fee for 60% of his federative rights. He continued to appear regularly until September, when he suffered a knee injury which took him out of action for six months.

On 13 September 2015, during his 100th match for Flamengo, Paulinho scored the first goal through a spectacular volley in a 3–1 away success over Chapecoense.

==== Santos (loan) ====
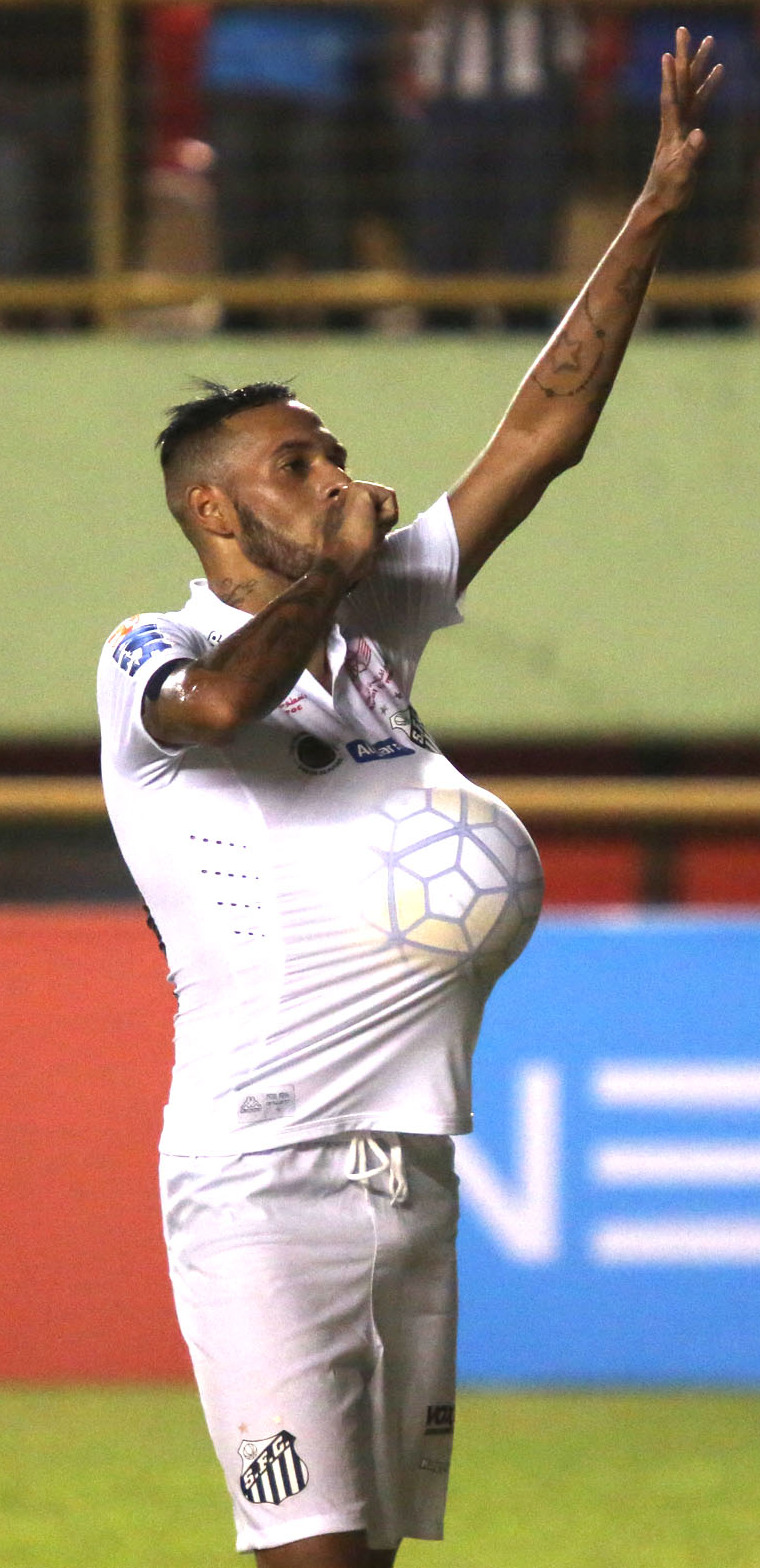
Paulinho in action for Santos in 2016

On 4 January 2016 Paulinho moved to Santos, in a one-year loan deal. He made his debut for the club late in the month, starting in a 1–1 home draw against São Bernardo.

Paulinho scored his first goals for Peixe on 31 March 2016, netting a brace in a 4–1 home routing of Ferroviária. However, after the arrivals of Jean Mota, Jonathan Copete and Emiliano Vecchio, he fell through the pecking order and only appeared rarely.

==== Vitória (loan) ====
On 18 January 2017 Paulinho signed on loan with Vitória until the end of the season, but was released in July, after appearing rarely.

==== Guarani (loan) ====
On 16 August 2017 Paulinho signed on loan with Guarani until the end of the season.

== Career statistics ==
As of 31 October 2023

Club	Season	League			Cup		Continental		State League		Other		Total	
Club	Season	Division	Apps	Goals	Apps	Goals	Apps	Goals	Apps	Goals	Apps	Goals	Apps	Goals
Flamengo-SP	2007	Paulista A3	—		—		—		—		11	7	11	7
Flamengo-SP	2008	Paulista A3	—		—		—		21	10	21 (Note: Appearance(s) in Copa Paulista)	9	42	19
Flamengo-SP	2009	Paulista A2	—		—		—		12	4	—		12	4
Flamengo-SP	Total		—		—		—		44	21	21	9	65	30
XV de Piracicaba	2009	Paulista A3	—		—		—		—		16	1	16	1
XV de Piracicaba	2010	Paulista A3	—		—		—		21	8	18	8	39	16
XV de Piracicaba	2011	Paulista A2	—		—		—		21	3	17	4	38	7
XV de Piracicaba	2012	Paulista	—		—		—		11	1	15	11	26	12
XV de Piracicaba	2013	Paulista	—		—		—		17	4	—		17	4
XV de Piracicaba	Total		—		—		—		70	16	66	24	136	40
Flamengo	2013	Série A	33	4	11	1	—		—		—		44	5
Flamengo	2014	Série A	13	2	2	0	5 (Note: Appearance(s) in Copa Libertadores)	1	10	3	—		30	6
Flamengo	2015	Série A	25	3	3	1	—		4	1	—		32	5
Flamengo	Total		71	9	16	2	5	1	14	4	—		106	16
Santos (loan)	2016	Série A	11	2	6	1	—		13	2	—		30	5
Vitória (loan)	2017	Série A	8	0	5	0	—		14	3	9 (Note: Appearance(s) in Copa do Nordeste)	0	36	3
Guarani (loan)	2017	Série B	7	0	—		—		—		—		7	0
Gyeongnam	2018	K League 1	23	2	—		—		—		—		23	2
Náutico	2019	Série C	2	0	—		—		—		—		2	0
Anápolis	2020	Goiano	—		—		—		9	2	—		9	2
Rio Branco–ES	2020	Capixaba	—		—		—		6	1	—		6	1
Rio Branco–ES	2021	Série D	4	0	2	0	—		11	1	—		17	1
Rio Branco–ES	Total		4	0	2	0	—		17	2	—		23	2
Desportiva Ferroviária	2022	Capixaba	—		—		—		8	3	—		8	3
Americano	2022	Carioca A2	—		—		—		—		3 (Note: Appearance(s) in Copa Rio)	0	3	0
Americano	2023	Carioca A2	—		—		—		9	0	4	0	13	0
Americano	Total		—		—		—		9	0	7	0	16	0
Coxim	2023	Sul-Mato-Grossense	—		—		—		2	0	—		2	0
União Cacoalense	2023	Rondoniense	—		—		—		5	1	—		5	1
Career total			126	13	29	3	5	1	205	54	103	33	468	104

== Honours ==
=== Club ===
Flamengo-SP

- Campeonato Paulista Série A3: 2008

Flamengo

- Copa do Brasil: 2013
- Campeonato Carioca: 2014

Santos

- Campeonato Paulista: 2016

Vitória

- Campeonato Baiano: 2017

=== Individual ===
- Copa Paulista Top Scorer: 2011
