= César (footballer, born 1992) =

Brazilian footballer

Personal information
- Full name: César Bernardo Dutra
- Date of birth: 27 January 1992 (age 34)
- Place of birth: Rio de Janeiro, Brazil
- Height: 1.94 m (6 ft 4 in)
- Position: Goalkeeper

Team information
- Current team: Deportes Limache (on loan from Deportes Concepción)
- Number: 23

Youth career
- 2009–2010: Audax Rio
- 2010: → Flamengo (loan)
- 2011: Flamengo

Senior career*
Years	Team	Apps	(Gls)
2011–2021	Flamengo	55	(0)
2016	→ Ponte Preta (loan)	0	(0)
2017	→ Ferroviária (loan)	0	(0)
2022	Bahia	0	(0)
2022–2025	Boavista	21	(0)
2026–	Deportes Concepción	11	(0)
2026–	→ Deportes Limache (loan)	0	(0)

International career
2011	Brazil U20	3	(0)
- * Club domestic league appearances and goals as of 10 September 2026

César Bernardo Dutra (born 27 January 1992), simply known as César, is a Brazilian professional footballer who plays as a goalkeeper for Chilean Liga de Primera club Deportes Limache on loan from Deportes Concepción.

== Career ==
=== Flamengo ===
César debuted for Flamengo on 7 December 2013 in the last match of the 2013 Brazilian Série A against Cruzeiro at Maracanã Stadium, the match ended 1-1. On 18 May 2018 César extended his contract with Flamengo until April 2022.

==== Ponte Preta (loan) ====
In February 2016 César moved to Ponte Preta on loan hoping to gain more experience, although he did not play a single match during the 2016 season.

==== Ferroviária (loan) ====
On 29 December 2016, César moved again on loan, this time to Ferroviária to play in the 2017 São Paulo State League. Shortly after he returned to Flamengo.

=== Bahia ===
On 30 March 2022, César left Flamengo permanently, joining Série B club Bahia, where he also failed to make an appearance.

=== Boavista ===
On 20 July 2022, César moved to Portugal, signing a two-year contract with Primeira Liga club Boavista. After making six appearances during his first season, in August 2023 he suffered an ACL tear in his right knee which kept him sidelined for most of the season, until he left the club in June 2024. However, just three months later, due to a goalkeeper injury crisis, César was resigned by Boavista, signing a two-year contract.

=== Deportes Concepción ===
On 26 December 2025, César moved to Chile, joining Liga de Primera club Deportes Concepción.

On 10 September 2026, César joined Deportes Limache until the end of the year.

== Career statistics ==
As of match played 18 November 2022

Appearances and goals by club, season and competition
Club	Season	League			State league		National cup		League cup		Continental		Total	
Club	Season	Division	Apps	Goals	Apps	Goals	Apps	Goals	Apps	Goals	Apps	Goals	Apps	Goals
Flamengo	2011	Série A	0	0	0	0	0	0	—		0	0	0	0
Flamengo	2012	Série A	0	0	0	0	0	0	—		0	0	0	0
Flamengo	2013	Série A	1	0	0	0	0	0	—		—		1	0
Flamengo	2014	Série A	1	0	0	0	0	0	—		0	0	1	0
Flamengo	2015	Série A	14	0	2 (Note: Appearance(s) in Campeonato Carioca)	0	2	0	—		—		18	0
Flamengo	2017	Série A	1	0	0	0	0	0	—		3 (Note: Appearance(s) in Copa Sudamericana)	0	4	0
Flamengo	2018	Série A	14	0	4	0	0	0	—		0	0	18	0
Flamengo	2019	Série A	6	0	4	0	0	0	—		2 (Note: Appearance(s) in Copa Libertadores)	0	12	0
Flamengo	2020	Série A	5	0	3	0	0	0	—		3	0	11	0
Flamengo	2021	Série A	0	0	0	0	0	0	—		0	0	0	0
Flamengo	Total		42	0	13	0	2	0	—		8	0	65	0
Ponte Preta (loan)	2016	Série A	0	0	0	0	0	0	—		—		0	0
Ferroviária (loan)	2017	Campeonato Paulista	—		0	0	0	0	—		—		0	0
Bahia	2022	Série B	0	0	0	0	0	0	—		—		0	0
Boavista	2022–23	Primeira Liga	5	0	—		0	0	1	0	—		6	0
Boavista	2023–24	Primeira Liga	0	0	—		0	0	0	0	—		0	0
Boavista	Total		5	0	—		0	0	1	0	—		6	0
Career total			47	0	13	0	2	0	1	0	8	0	71	0

== Honours ==
Flamengo

- Copa Libertadores: 2019
- Recopa Sudamericana: 2020
- Campeonato Brasileiro Série A: 2019, 2020
- Supercopa do Brasil: 2020, 2021
- Copa do Brasil: 2013
- Campeonato Carioca: 2014, 2019, 2020, 2021

=== International ===
Brazil U-20

- FIFA U-20 World Cup: 2011
