= Gabriel (footballer, born 1990) =

Brazilian footballer

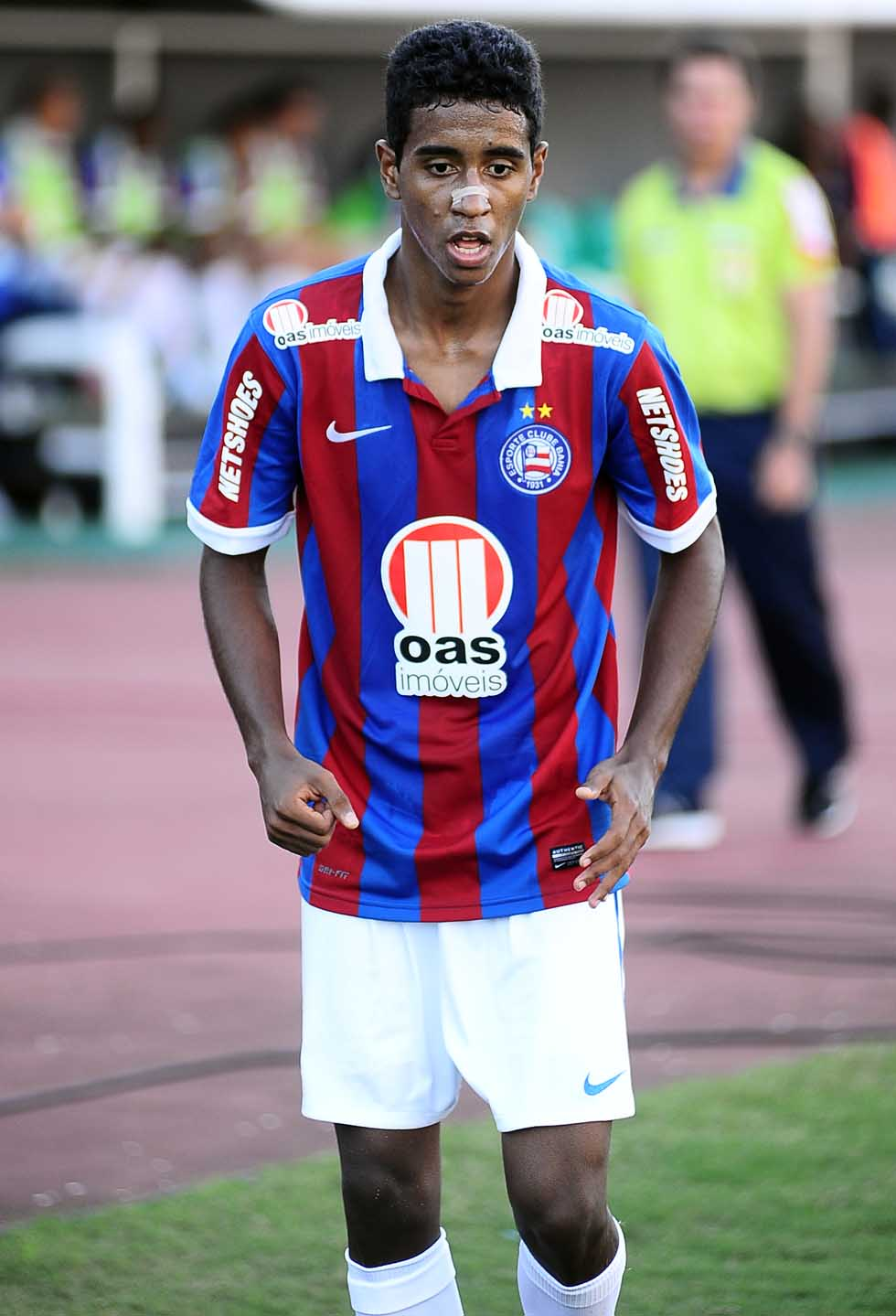

Personal information
- Full name: Gabriel Santana Pinto
- Date of birth: 6 January 1990 (age 36)
- Place of birth: Salvador, Brazil
- Height: 1.78 m (5 ft 10 in)
- Position: Attacking midfielder

Team information
- Current team: Sporting Cristal
- Number: 27

Youth career
- 2009–2010: Bahia

Senior career*
Years	Team	Apps	(Gls)
2011–2012	Bahia	83	(13)
2013–2019	Flamengo	205	(22)
2018	→ Sport (loan)	47	(6)
2019	→ Kashiwa Reysol (loan)	22	(1)
2020	Coritiba	18	(1)
2020–2022	CSA	95	(6)
2023–2025	Mirassol	132	(20)
2026–	Sporting Cristal	2	(0)
- * Club domestic league appearances and goals as of 13 December 2025

Gabriel Santana Pinto or simply Gabriel (born 6 January 1990) is a Brazilian footballer who plays as an attacking midfielder for Sporting Cristal.

== Career ==
=== Flamengo ===
On 10 January 2013 Flamengo signed Gabriel from Bahia, acquiring 50% of his economic rights for R$6.7 million.

==== Sport (loan) ====
Since the end of the 2017 season Gabriel began to lose space in the Flamengo's first team. As result of that he was loaned to Sport on 15 January 2018 to play at the club until the end of the 2018 season.

== Career statistics ==
As of 11 April 2021.

Club	Season	League			Cup		Continental		Other		Total	
Club	Season	Division	Apps	Goals	Apps	Goals	Apps	Goals	Apps	Goals	Apps	Goals
Bahia	2011	Série A	18	0	2	0	0	0	7	0	27	0
Bahia	2012	Série A	25	6	7	1	1 (Note: Appearance(s) in Copa Sudamericana.)	0	22	6	55	13
Bahia	Total		43	6	9	1	1	0	29	6	82	13
Flamengo	2013	Série A	29	2	7	0	0	0	8 (Note: Appearance(s) in Campeonato Carioca.)	1	44	3
Flamengo	2014	Série A	20	3	5	2	5 (Note: Appearance(s) in Copa Libertadores.)	0	16	4	46	9
Flamengo	2015	Série A	24	4	2	0	0	0	14	0	40	4
Flamengo	2016	Série A	22	3	3	0	1	0	18 (Note: 14 appearances and one goal in Campeonato Carioca and four appearances in Primeira Liga.)	1	44	4
Flamengo	2017	Série A	6	0	3	0	7 (Note: Six appearances and one goal in Copa Libertadores, one appearance in Copa Sudamericana.)	1	14 (Note: Ten appearances in Campeonato Carioca, four appearances and one goal in Primeira Liga.)	1	30	2
Flamengo	Total		101	12	20	2	13	1	70	7	204	22
Sport (loan)	2018	Série A	33	5	2	0	0	0	12 (Note: Appearance(s) in Campeonato Pernambucano.)	1	47	6
Kashiwa Reysol (loan)	2019	J2 League	16	1	4	0	–		–		20	1
Coritiba	2020	Série A	8	0	0	0	–		10 (Note: Appearance(s) in Campeonato Paranaense.)	1	18	1
CSA	2020	Série B	15	0	0	0	–		–		15	0
CSA	2021	Série B	0	0	1	0	–		12 (Note: Four appearances and one goal in Campeonato Alagoano, eight appearances in Copa do Nordeste.)	1	13	1
CSA	Total		15	0	1	0	0	0	12	1	28	1
Career total			216	24	36	3	14	1	133	16	399	44

== Honours ==
Bahia

- Campeonato Baiano: 2012

Flamengo

- Copa do Brasil: 2013
- Campeonato Carioca: 2014, 2017

Kashiwa Reysol

- J2 League: 2019

CSA

- Campeonato Alagoano: 2021
