= Luiz Antônio (footballer, born 1991) =

Brazilian footballer (born 1991)

Personal information
- Full name: Luiz Antônio de Souza Soares
- Date of birth: 11 March 1991 (age 35)
- Place of birth: Rio de Janeiro, Brazil
- Height: 1.81 m (5 ft 11 1/2 in)
- Positions: Defensive midfielder; right-back

Team information
- Current team: Hong Linh Ha Tinh
- Number: 88

Youth career
- 2003–2011: Flamengo

Senior career*
Years	Team	Apps	(Gls)
2011–2017	Flamengo	168	(8)
2016	→ Sport (loan)	28	(2)
2016	→ Bahia (loan)	21	(3)
2017	→ Chapecoense (loan)	58	(7)
2018	Chapecoense	11	(0)
2018–2019	Al-Shabab	29	(3)
2019–2020	Baniyas	24	(4)
2021	Ajman	12	(2)
2022–2023	Brusque	16	(0)
2023	Lamphun Warriors	13	(1)
2023–2025	Dong A Thanh Hoa	48	(13)
2025–2026	Haiphong	26	(7)
2026–	Hong Linh Ha Tinh	1	(0)
- * Club domestic league appearances and goals as of 6 September 2026

Luiz Antônio de Souza Soares (born 11 March 1991) is a Brazilian professional footballer who currently plays for V.League 1 club Hong Linh Ha Tinh. Mainly a defensive midfielder, he can also play as a right-back.

== Club career ==
=== Flamengo ===
Born on 11 March 1991, in Rio de Janeiro, Luiz Antônio joined Flamengo's youth setup in 2003, aged 11. He made his first team – and Série A – debut on 19 June 2011, in a 0–0 home draw against Botafogo.

On 26 August 2011, Luiz Antônio renewed his contract until 2016, but subsequently suffered a shoulder injury which kept him out for the remainder of the campaign. He scored his first professional goal on 25 January of the following year, but in a 1–2 Copa Libertadores away loss against Real Potosí.

==== Sport (loan) ====
On 29 December 2015, Luiz Antônio agreed to a one-year loan deal with fellow top tier club Sport. A starter during the 2016 Campeonato Pernambucano, he was rarely used in the year's Brasileirão, and rescinded his contract.

==== Bahia (loan) ====
Immediately after rescinding with Sport, Luiz Antônio joined Bahia on loan until the end of the year. He was a regular starter for the club, achieving promotion to the main category after contributing with three goals in 21 appearances.

==== Chapecoense (loan) ====
On 16 January 2017, Chapecoense signed Luiz Antônio, on loan from Flamengo, until the 2017 season. He also scored the winning goal for the side in their Libertadores debut on 7 March, a 2–1 away win against Zulia.

=== Al-Shabab ===
On 24 July 2018, Antônio joined Saudi club Al-Shabab.

=== Baniyas ===
On 7 July 2019, Baniyas has signed Antônio for one seasons from Al-Shabab.

== Career statistics ==
(Correct As of 6 April 2021)

Appearances and goals by club, season and competition
Club	Season	League			Cup		Continental		Other		Total	
Club	Season	Division	Apps	Goals	Apps	Goals	Apps	Goals	Apps	Goals	Apps	Goals
Flamengo	2011	Série A	9	0	—		2	0	—		11	0
Flamengo	2012	Série A	26	1	—		8	3	12	0	46	4
Flamengo	2013	Série A	32	1	11	0	—		5	0	48	1
Flamengo	2014	Série A	27	1	5	0	—		5	1	37	2
Flamengo	2015	Série A	14	1	2	0	—		10	0	26	1
Flamengo	Total		108	4	18	0	10	3	32	1	168	8
Sport (loan)	2016	Série A	4	0	—		—		24	2	28	2
Bahia (loan)	2016	Série B	21	3	—		—		—		21	3
Chapecoense (loan)	2017	Série A	30	3	1	0	9 (Note: Six appearances and one goal in Copa Libertadores, three appearances in Copa Sudamericana.)	1	19 (Note: Fourteen appearances and three goals in Campeonato Catarinense, two appearances in Primeira Liga, two appearances in Recopa Sudamericana, one appearance in J.League Cup / Copa Sudamericana Championship.)	3	59	7
Chapecoense	2018	Série A	5	0	1	0	0	0	5 (Note: Appearance(s) in Campeonato Catarinense.)	0	11	0
Al Shabab FC	2018–19	Saudi Pro League	29	3	1	0	—		—		30	3
Baniyas	2019–20	UAE Pro League	16	4	5	0	—		—		21	4
Ajman	2020–21	UAE Pro League	10	1	—		—		—		10	1
Career total			223	18	26	0	19	4	80	6	348	28

== Honours ==
Flamengo

- Copa do Brasil: 2013
- Campeonato Carioca: 2014

Chapecoense

- Campeonato Catarinense: 2017

Thanh Hóa

- Vietnamese Cup: 2023–24
