= Jayme de Almeida =

Brazilian footballer

Personal information
- Full name: Jayme de Almeida Filho
- Date of birth: 17 March 1953 (age 73)
- Place of birth: Rio de Janeiro, Brazil
- Position: Centre-back

Senior career*
Years	Team	Apps	(Gls)
1973–1977	Flamengo	198	(23)
1977–1980	São Paulo	59	(0)
1982	Guarani		

International career
1976	Brazil		

Managerial career
- 1992: Desportiva Ferroviaria
- 2009: Iraty
- 2010–2013: Flamengo (assistant)
- 2012–2013: Flamengo (caretaker)
- 2013–2014: Flamengo
- 2015–2018: Flamengo (assistant)
- 2015: Flamengo (caretaker)
- 2015: Flamengo (caretaker)
- 2017: Flamengo (caretaker)
- * Club domestic league appearances and goals

Jayme de Almeida Filho (born 17 March 1953) is a Brazilian professional football coach and former player. A retired centre-back, as a player he spent almost his entire club career with Flamengo.

== Playing career ==
Jayme de Almeida was born in Rio de Janeiro, son of Flamengo ex-player and coach Jaime de Almeida. He played as a defender at Flamengo, his father's former club, between 1973 and 1977, in 198 games, scoring three goals during that time. He then joined São Paulo, where he played 59 matches between 1977 and 1980, the team winning the Campeonato Paulista in 1980. In 1980, he had a stint at Sport, arriving during the Campeonato Pernambucano, which they won that year. He later played for Guarani. He served in the Brazil national football team in 1976.

== Post-playing career ==
He debuted as a coach for Desportiva Ferroviaria in 1992; that year they won the Championship Capixaba. He was head coach for Iraty in 2009.

He assumed the post of technical assistant at Vanderlei Luxemburgo in October 2010. and with the fall of the then coach, commanded interim time in games of has assumed interim time in games of Taça Guanabara that year.

With the unexpected exit Mano Menezes upturn command, again as interim and months after being hired. where in that year was Copa do Brasil.

== Honours ==
=== Player ===
Flamengo

- Campeonato Carioca: 1974

São Paulo

- Campeonato Paulista: 1980

=== Coach ===
Desportiva Ferroviária

- Campeonato Capixaba: 1992

CFZ

- Campeonato Carioca Série C: 1997

Flamengo

- Copa do Brasil: 2013
- Campeonato Carioca: 2014
