= Nixon (footballer) =

Brazilian footballer

Personal information
- Full name: Nixon Darlanio Reis Cardoso
- Date of birth: 20 June 1992 (age 34)
- Place of birth: Juazeiro, Brazil
- Height: 1.76 m (5 ft 9 1/2 in)
- Position: Forward

Team information
- Current team: Juazeirense

Youth career
- 2009: Porto-PE
- 2009–2012: Flamengo

Senior career*
Years	Team	Apps	(Gls)
2012–2018	Flamengo	61	(13)
2016	→ América Mineiro (loan)	11	(0)
2017	→ Red Bull Brasil (loan)	10	(1)
2017	→ ABC (loan)	4	(0)
2018	→ Kalmar (loan)	7	(0)
2020	Portuguesa-RJ	2	(0)
2020–2021	Mosta	2	(0)
2021	Alashkert	2	(0)
2022–	Juazeirense	3	(1)
- * Club domestic league appearances and goals as of 18:22, 29 May 2022 (UTC)

Nixon Darlanio Reis Cardoso (born 20 June 1992), simply known as Nixon, is a Brazilian footballer who plays as a forward who plays for Juazeirense.

== Career ==
=== Flamengo ===
Nixon made his professional debut for Flamengo against Ponte Preta in round 20 of the 2012 Campeonato Brasileiro. He scored his first goal in the final match of the season against Botafogo. At the start of 2015, Nixon's contract with Flamengo was renewed through 2018. In March he underwent surgery to correct the patellar tendon in his left knee. In July he ruptured the same tendon, ruling him out for the remainder of the season.

==== América (MG) (loan) ====
On 19 July 2016 Nixon signed with América (MG) on loan until the end of the season after spending more than 18 months on the sidelines due to serious injuries. Nixon did not score for the club, who were relegated at the end of the 2016 Série A season.

==== Red Bull Brasil (loan) ====
On 11 January 2017 Nixon signed on loan with Red Bull Brasil for the 2017 São Paulo State League.

==== ABC (loan) ====
On 25 July 2017, Nixon moved to ABC on loan for the club's Série B season.

==== Kalmar (loan) ====
On 5 January 2018, Nixon transferred on loan from Flamengo to the Swedish club Kalmar FF. At the end of 2018, Flamengo did not renew his contract and Nixon was released as a free agent.

=== Mosta ===
After a spell at Portuguesa-RJ back in Brazil, Nixon joined Maltese Premier League club Mosta on 22 August 2020.

== Career statistics ==
(Correct As of 30 August 2019)

Club	Season	League			Cup		Continental		State League		Total	
Club	Season	Division	Apps	Goals	Apps	Goals	Apps	Goals	Apps	Goals	Apps	Goals
Flamengo	2012	Série A	7	1	–		–		–		7	1
Flamengo	2013	Série A	15	1	5	1	–		10	2	30	4
Flamengo	2014	Série A	16	6	4	0	1	0	8	3	29	9
Flamengo	2015	Série A	0	0	0	0	–		5	0	5	0
Flamengo	Total		38	8	9	1	1	0	23	5	71	14
América (MG) (loan)	2016	Série A	11	0	1	0	–		–		12	0
América (MG) (loan)	Total		11	0	1	0	–		–		12	0
Red Bull Brasil (loan)
Red Bull Brasil (loan)	2017	Série D	1	0	–		–		9	1	10	1
Red Bull Brasil (loan)	Total		1	0	0	0	0	0	9	1	10	1
ABC (loan)
ABC (loan)	2017	Série B	4	0	–		–		–		4	0
ABC (loan)	Total		4	0	0	0	0	0	0	0	4	0
Kalmar (loan)
Kalmar (loan)	2018	Allsvenskan	7	0	0	0	–		–		7	0
Kalmar (loan)	Total		7	0	0	0	0	0	0	0	7	0
Career total			61	8	10	1	1	0	32	6	104	15

== Honours ==
Flamengo

- Copa do Brasil: 2013
- Campeonato Carioca: 2014
