= Rodrigo Frauches =

Brazilian footballer

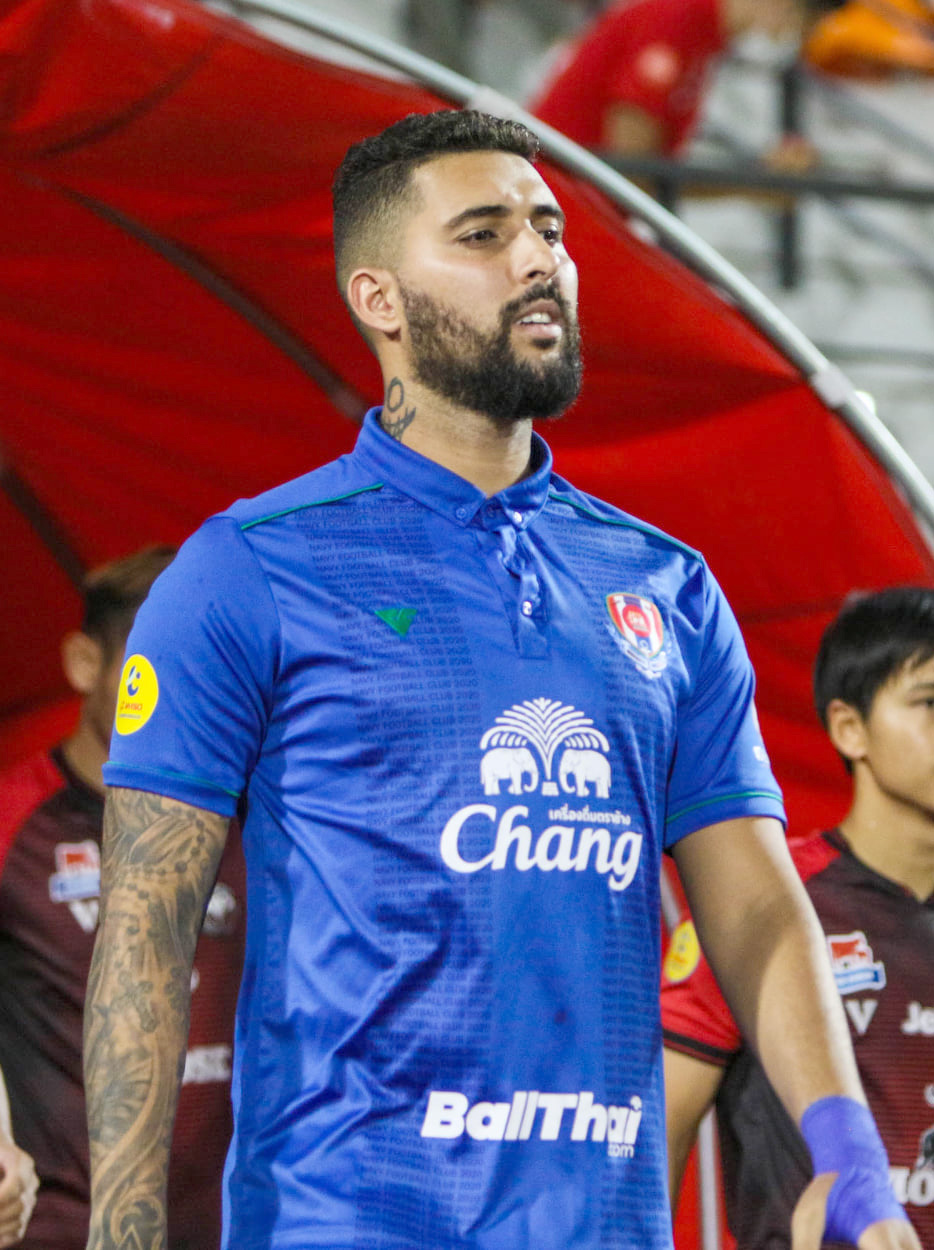

Personal information
- Full name: Rodrigo Frauches de Souza Santos
- Date of birth: September 28, 1992 (age 34)
- Place of birth: São João de Meriti, Brazil
- Height: 1.85 m (6 ft 1 in)
- Position: Centre back

Youth career
- 2006–2012: Flamengo

Senior career*
Years	Team	Apps	(Gls)
2012–2016	Flamengo	14	(0)
2015	→ Macaé (loan)	10	(0)
2016	→ Boavista (loan)	1	(0)
2016–2019	Army United	49	(2)
2019–2021	Navy	11	(2)

International career^{‡}
2011	Brazil U-18	3	(0)
- * Club domestic league appearances and goals as of August 27, 2019 ‡ National team caps and goals as of July 14, 2014

Rodrigo Frauches de Souza Santos (born September 28, 1992 in São João de Meriti), known as just Rodrigo Frauches or Frauches, is a Brazilian football centre back.

== Career ==
=== Career statistics ===
(Correct as of September 5, 2014)

Club	Season	Brazilian Série A		Copa do Brasil		Copa Libertadores		Copa Sudamericana		State League		Total	
Club	Season	Apps	Goals	Apps	Goals	Apps	Goals	Apps	Goals	Apps	Goals	Apps	Goals
Flamengo
Flamengo	2012	9	0	-	-	-	-	-	-	1	0	10	0
Flamengo	2013	4	0	0	0	-	-	-	-	2	0	6	0
Flamengo	2014	0	0	0	0	-	-	-	-	5	0	5	0
Total		13	0	0	0	0	0	0	0	8	0	21	0

according to combined sources on the Flamengo official website and Flaestatística.

== Honours ==
=== Club ===
Flamengo

- Copa do Brasil: 2013
- Campeonato Carioca: 2014

=== National team ===
Brazil U-18

- Copa Internacional do Mediterrâneo: 2011

Brazil U-20

- FIFA U-20 World Cup: 2011
