= Víctor Cáceres =

Paraguayan footballer (born 1985)

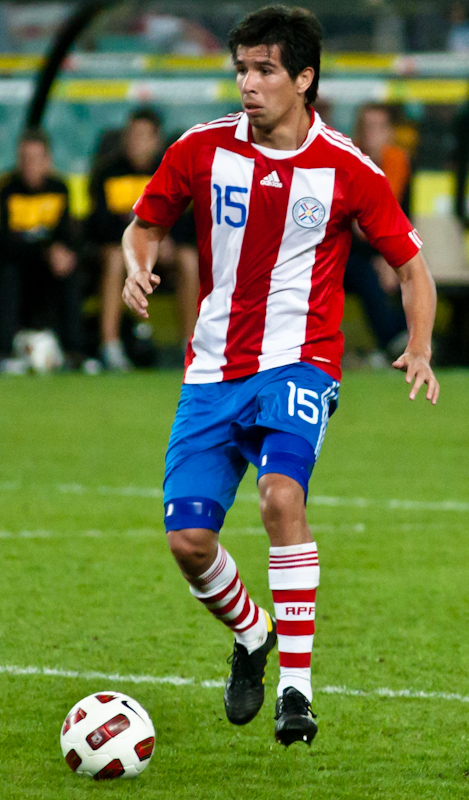
- Cáceres in a friendly against Australia in 2010

Personal information
- Full name: Víctor Javier Cáceres Centurión
- Date of birth: 25 March 1985 (age 41)
- Place of birth: Asunción, Paraguay
- Height: 1.86 m (6 ft 1 in)
- Position: Defensive midfielder

Youth career
- 2000–2003: Atlántida
- 2003–2004: Libertad

Senior career*
Years	Team	Apps	(Gls)
2004–2012	Libertad	75	(10)
2012–2015	Flamengo	48	(1)
2015–2017	Al Rayyan	30	(6)
2017–2020	Cerro Porteño	35	(2)
2020	Nacional Asunción	7	(0)
2021	12 de Octubre	13	(2)
2021–2022	Guaraní	10	(0)
2022	12 de Octubre	2	(1)

International career
2007–2017	Paraguay	73	(2)
Medal record
Representing Paraguay
Copa América
Runner-up	2011 Argentina	Team
- * Club domestic league appearances and goals

Víctor Javier Cáceres Centurión (born 25 March 1985) is a retired Paraguayan footballer.

== Club career ==
Víctor Cáceres begins his career at the age of 13 in the Escuela de fútbol de la Asociación Mutual del Personal de la Administración Nacional de Electricidad (Ampande), located in the Santísima Trinidad neighborhood of the capital of the country, Asunción.

Cáceres debuted for Atlántida Asunción in 2002 in Paraguay's 3rd division. Cáceres continued his career in the youth divisions of Atlántida SC where he played until the age of 18, moving to the youth divisions of Libertad and making his professional debut with the team at the age of 21. Slowly, he settled in the first team and eventually became a key player, helping the team win the league and becoming part of the Paraguay national team.

=== Flamengo ===
In July 2012 at the end of his contract with Libertad Víctor signed with Brazilian Série A club Flamengo on a free transfer. He took almost a month to be able to play due to contractual problems with his former club. Víctor debuted for Flamengo on 9 August 2012 in a 2x0 win against Figueirense at Orlando Scarpelli Stadium.

=== 12 de Octubre ===
At 12 de Octubre, Caceres summoned 1, 706 minutes in 21 games for the club. 19 of the games were in the starting 11.

=== Guaraní ===
In July 2021, Caceres joined Club Guaraní on a free-transfer. He joined the club with his brother, Marcos Caceres.

== Career statistics ==
(Correct As of 22 August 2019)

Club	Season	League			Cup		Continental		Other		Total	
Club	Season	Division	Apps	Goals	Apps	Goals	Apps	Goals	Apps	Goals	Apps	Goals
Libertad	2010	Primera División	29	3	-	-	12 (Note: Appearance(s) in Copa Libertadores.)	1	-	-	41	4
Libertad	2011	Primera División	33	4	-	-	15 (Note: Ten appearances in Copa Libertadores, five appearances in Copa Sudamericana.)	0	-	-	39	4
Libertad	2012	Primera División	13	3	-	-	12	3	-	-	25	6
Libertad	Total		75	10	0	0	39	4	0	0	105	14
Flamengo	2012	Série A	10	0	-	-	-	-	-	-	10	0
Flamengo	2013	Série A	13	1	5	0	-	-	9 (Note: Appearance(s) in Rio State League.)	0	24	1
Flamengo	2014	Série A	20	0	4	1	3	1	7	0	34	2
Flamengo	2015	Série A	5	0	3	0	-	-	5	0	13	0
Flamengo	Total		48	1	12	1	3	1	21	0	84	3
Al-Rayyan SC	2015–16	Stars League	22	6	-	-	-	-	-	-	22	6
Al-Rayyan SC	2016–17	Stars League	8	0	-	-	5 (Note: Appearance(s) in AFC Champions League.)	1	-	-	13	1
Al-Rayyan SC	Total		30	6	0	0	5	1	0	0	35	7
Cerro Porteño	2017	Primera División	5	0	-	-	-	-	-	-	5	0
Cerro Porteño	2018	Primera División	10	2	-	-	1	0	-	-	11	2
Cerro Porteño	2019	Primera División	8	1	-	-	2	2	-	-	10	3
Cerro Porteño	Total		23	3	0	0	3	2	0	0	27	5
Career total			176	20	12	1	50	8	21	0	259	29

== International career ==
=== International goals ===
Scores and results list Paraguay's goal tally first.

#	Date	Venue	Opponent	Score	Result	Competition
1.	1 June 2014	Allianz Riviera, Nice, France	France	1–1	1–1	Friendly
2.	31 August 2017	Estadio Monumental David Arellano, Santiago, Chile	Chile	2–0	3–0	2018 FIFA World Cup qualification

== Honours ==
Libertad

- Paraguayan Primera División: 2006, 2007, 2008 Apertura, 2008 Clausura

Flamengo

- Copa do Brasil: 2013
- Campeonato Carioca: 2014
