= Amaral (footballer, born 1988) =

Brazilian footballer

Personal information
- Full name: Mauricio Azevedo Alves
- Date of birth: 1 May 1988 (age 38)
- Place of birth: Rio das Ostras, Brazil
- Height: 1.74 m (5 ft 9 in)
- Position: Defensive midfielder

Team information
- Current team: Moto Club

Youth career
- 2006: Vasco da Gama

Senior career*
Years	Team	Apps	(Gls)
2007–2010	Quissamã	0	(0)
2011–2012	Nova Iguaçu	31	(0)
2012	→ Flamengo (loan)	18	(0)
2013–2015	Flamengo	45	(0)
2015	→ Vitória (loan)	38	(0)
2016	Vitória	32	(3)
2018	Boa Esporte	21	(1)
2019	CSA	2	(0)
2020–	Moto Club	7	(0)
- * Club domestic league appearances and goals as of 19:36, 27 October 2020 (UTC)

Mauricio Azevedo Alves (born May 1, 1988), better known as Amaral, is a Brazilian football defensive midfielder who currently plays for Moto Club.

== Career ==
=== Career statistics ===
(Correct as of November 19, 2014)

Appearances and goals by club, season and competition
Club	Season	Brazilian Série A		Copa do Brasil		Copa Libertadores		Copa Sudamericana		State League		Total	
Club	Season	Apps	Goals	Apps	Goals	Apps	Goals	Apps	Goals	Apps	Goals	Apps	Goals
Flamengo
Flamengo	2012	16	0	—		—		—		—		16	0
Flamengo	2013	15	0	10	1	—		—		6	0	31	1
Flamengo	2014	13	0	2	0	4	0	—		10	0	29	0
Total		44	0	12	1	4	0	0	0	16	0	76	1

according to combined sources on the Flamengo official website and Flaestatística.

== Honours ==
Flamengo

- Copa do Brasil: 2013
- Campeonato Carioca: 2014

Vitória

- Campeonato Baiano: 2016
