= Wallace (footballer, born 1987) =

Brazilian footballer

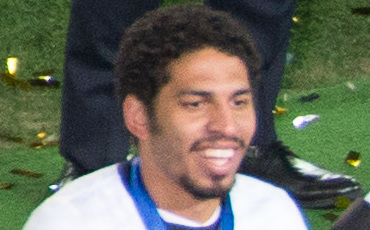
- Wallace with Corinthians in 2012

Personal information
- Full name: Wallace Reis da Silva
- Date of birth: 26 December 1987 (age 38)
- Place of birth: Conceição do Coité, Brazil
- Height: 1.83 m (6 ft 0 in)
- Position: Centre-back

Team information
- Current team: Londrina
- Number: 4

Youth career
- 2003–2007: Vitória

Senior career*
Years	Team	Apps	(Gls)
2008–2010	Vitória	147	(11)
2011–2012	Corinthians	57	(1)
2013–2016	Flamengo	168	(7)
2016–2018	Grêmio	18	(0)
2017	→ Gaziantepspor (loan)	14	(0)
2017–2018	→ Vitória (loan)	24	(2)
2018–2020	Göztepe	54	(2)
2020–2022	Vitória	80	(1)
2022	→ Brusque (loan)	45	(4)
2023–2024	Brusque	91	(2)
2025–	Londrina	73	(1)
- * Club domestic league appearances and goals as of 18 November 2026

Wallace Reis da Silva, known simply as Wallace (born 26 December 1987), is a Brazilian professional footballer who plays as a centre-back for Londrina.

== Career statistics ==
As of 18 July 2016

Appearances and goals by club, season and competition
Club	Season	League			National cup (Note: Includes Copa do Brasil.)		Continental		State League		Other		Total	
Club	Season	Division	Apps	Goals	Apps	Goals	Apps	Goals	Apps	Goals	Apps	Goals	Apps	Goals
Vitória	2008	Série A	15	0	0	0	–		4	0	–		19	0
Vitória	2009	Série A	28	1	6	0	4 (Note: Appearances in Copa Sudamericana)	1	19	1	–		57	3
Vitória	2010	Série A	27	2	11	1	2	1	20	4	–		64	8
Vitória	Total		70	3	17	1	6	2	43	5	0	0	136	11
Corinthians	2011	Série A	16	0	0	0	–		9	0	–		25	0
Corinthians	2012	Série A	21	1	0	0	3 (Note: Appearances in Copa Libertadores)	0	7	0	1 (Note: Appearance in FIFA Club World Cup)	0	32	1
Corinthians	Total		37	1	0	0	3	0	16	0	1	0	57	1
Flamengo	2013	Série A	30	3	10	0	–		9	0	–		49	3
Flamengo	2014	Série A	29	1	1	0	6	0	12	0	–		48	1
Flamengo	2015	Série A	28	1	6	1	–		14	0	–		48	2
Flamengo	2016	0	0	0	0	–		18	1	–		18	1	
Flamengo	Total		87	5	17	1	6	0	53	1	0	0	163	7
Grêmio	2016	Série A	4	0	0	0	–		–		–		4	0
Career total			198	9	34	2	15	2	112	6	1	0	360	19

== Honours ==
Vitória

- Campeonato Baiano: 2008, 2009, 2010

Corinthians

- Campeonato Brasileiro Série A: 2011
- Copa Libertadores: 2012
- FIFA Club World Cup: 2012

Flamengo

- Copa do Brasil: 2013
- Campeonato Carioca: 2014
