= Chiquinho Baiano =

Brazilian footballer (born 1980)

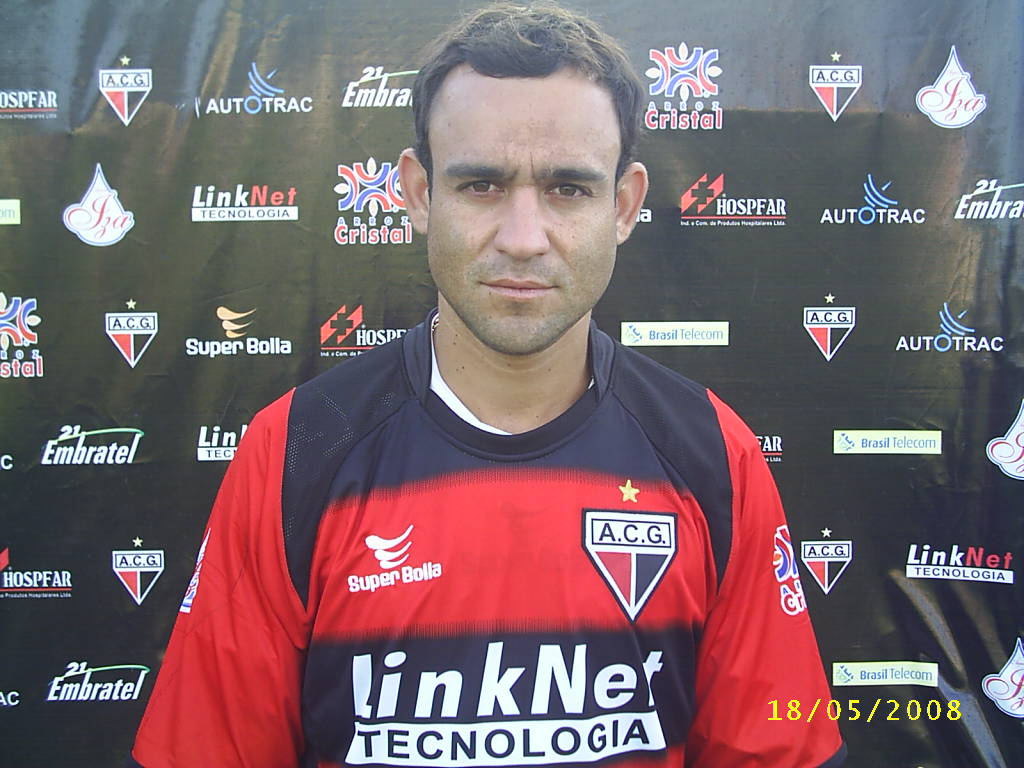

Personal information
- Full name: Francisco Gomes Andrade Júnior
- Date of birth: 13 March 1980 (age 46)
- Place of birth: Feira de Santana, Brazil
- Height: 1.78 m (5 ft 10 in)
- Position: Left-back

Team information
- Current team: Treze

Youth career
- 2000: Bahia

Senior career*
Years	Team	Apps	(Gls)
2000–2005	Bahia		
2005	Ceará		
2005–2006	Avaí		
2006	Santa Cruz		
2007	Skoda Xanthi	19	(0)
2007	→ Niki Volos (loan)		
2007	Avaí		
2008	Santa Cruz		
2008–2010	Atlético Goianiense	40	(0)
2011	Brasiliense	0	(0)
2011	ASA	25	(2)
2011	Veranópolis		
2012	Itumbiara	11	(0)
2012–2013	ASA	59	(8)
2014–	Treze		
- * Club domestic league appearances and goals as of 22:59, 10 October 2012 (UTC)

Francisco Gomes Andrade Júnior, better known as Chiquinho or Chiquinho Baiano (born 13 March 1980) is a Brazilian professional footballer who plays as a left-back for Treze.

== Career statistics ==
(Correct as of 16 October 2010)

Club	Season	State League		Brazilian Série A		Copa do Brasil		Copa Libertadores		Copa Sudamericana		Total	
Club	Season	Apps	Goals	Apps	Goals	Apps	Goals	Apps	Goals	Apps	Goals	Apps	Goals
Atlético Goianiense	2010	-	-	14	0	1	0	-	-	-	-	15	0
Total		-	-	14	0	1	0	-	-	-	-	15	0
