= João Paulo (footballer, born 1986) =

Brazilian footballer (born 1986)

Personal information
- Full name: João Paulo Gomes da Costa
- Date of birth: 1 July 1986 (age 40)
- Place of birth: Rio de Janeiro, Brazil
- Height: 1.73 m (5 ft 8 in)
- Position: Left back

Youth career
- 2000–2001: Tombense
- 2001: Vitória
- 2002–2003: Atlético Mineiro
- 2004: Internacional

Senior career*
Years	Team	Apps	(Gls)
2005–2007	Avaí	29	(0)
2008	Rio Claro	1	(0)
2009	Novo Hamburgo	15	(2)
2009	Gama	3	(0)
2010	Treze	20	(1)
2011–2012	Mogi Mirim	26	(1)
2011	→ Guarani (loan)	25	(2)
2012	→ Ponte Preta (loan)	25	(1)
2013–2016	Desportivo Brasil	0	(0)
2013–2014	→ Flamengo (loan)	80	(4)
2015	→ Palmeiras (loan)	12	(0)
2016	→ Bahia (loan)	21	(0)
2017–2018	Figueirense	43	(5)
2019–2022	América Mineiro	117	(6)
- * Club domestic league appearances and goals as of 18 September 2022

João Paulo Gomes da Costa (born 1 July 1986), known as João Paulo, is a Brazilian footballer who plays as a left back.

== Club career ==
=== Flamengo ===
On 10 January 2013 Flamengo signed João Paulo on a two-year loan from Mogi Mirim.

=== Palmeiras ===
On 6 January 2015, João Paulo was signed by Palmeiras on a one-year loan deal from Desportivo Brasil.

== Career statistics ==
As of 13 October 2021

Club	Season	League			State League		Cup		Continental		Other		Total	
Club	Season	Division	Apps	Goals	Apps	Goals	Apps	Goals	Apps	Goals	Apps	Goals	Apps	Goals
Avaí	2005	Série B	0	0	0	0	—		—		—		0	0
Avaí	2006	Série B	2	0	9	0	—		—		—		11	0
Avaí	2007	Série B	13	0	5	0	3	0	—		—		21	0
Avaí	Subtotal		15	0	14	0	3	0	—		—		32	0
Rio Claro	2008	Paulista	—		1	0	—		—		—		1	0
Novo Hamburgo	2009	Gaúcho	—		15	2	—		—		—		15	2
Gama	2009	Série D	3	0	—		—		—		—		3	0
Treze	2010	Série C	4	0	16	1	2	0	—		8 (Note: Appearance(s) in Copa do Nordeste)	0	30	1
Mogi Mirim	2011	Paulista	—		10	0	—		—		—		10	0
Mogi Mirim	2012	Paulista	—		16	1	—		—		—		16	1
Mogi Mirim	Subtotal		—		26	1	—		—		—		26	1
Guarani (loan)	2011	Série B	25	2	—		—		—		—		25	2
Ponte Preta (loan)	2012	Série B	25	1	—		—		—		—		25	1
Flamengo	2013	Série A	29	2	14	1	9	0	—		—		52	3
Flamengo	2014	Série A	28	0	9	1	5	0	2 (Note: Appearance(s) in Copa Libertadores)	0	—		44	1
Flamengo	Subtotal		57	2	23	2	14	0	2	0	—		96	4
Palmeiras	2015	Série A	6	0	6	0	2	0	—		—		14	0
Bahia	2016	Série B	19	0	2	0	2	0	—		4	0	27	0
Figueirense	2017	Série B	7	1	2	0	1	0	—		—		10	1
Figueirense	2018	Série B	24	2	10	2	2	0	—		—		36	4
Figueirense	Subtotal		31	3	12	2	3	0	—		—		46	5
América Mineiro	2019	Série B	31	1	14	2	2	0	—		—		47	3
América Mineiro	2020	Série B	25	1	7	0	7	0	—		—		39	1
América Mineiro	2021	Série A	12	1	10	1	3	0	—		—		25	2
América Mineiro	Total		68	3	31	3	12	0	—		—		111	6
Career total			253	11	146	11	38	0	2	0	12	0	451	22

== Honours ==
Avaí

- Campeonato Catarinense: 2005

Treze

- Campeonato Paraibano: 2010

Flamengo

- Copa do Brasil: 2013
- Campeonato Carioca: 2014

Palmeiras

- Copa do Brasil: 2015
