= Hernane =

Brazilian footballer (born 1986)

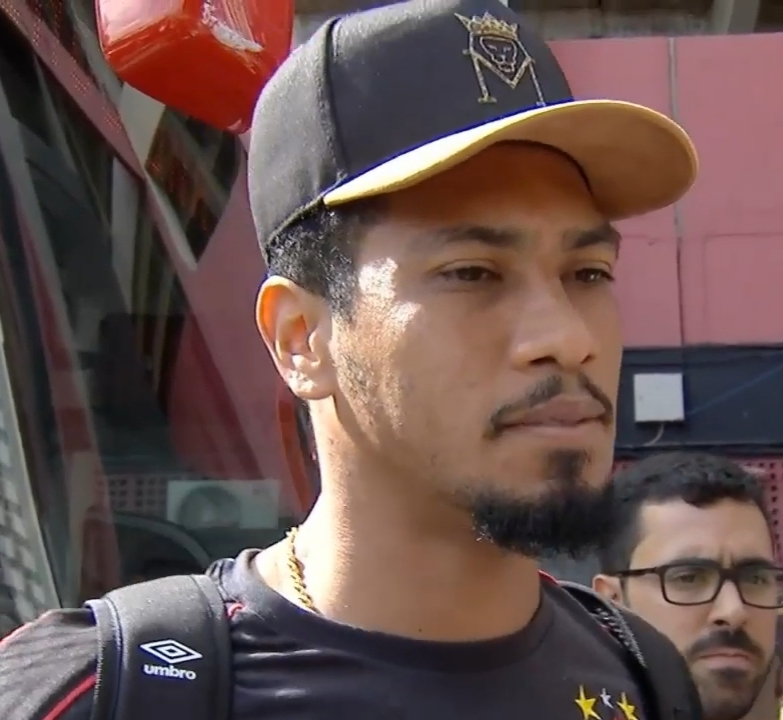

Personal information
- Full name: Hernane Vidal de Souza
- Date of birth: 4 August 1986 (age 40)
- Place of birth: Bom Jesus da Lapa, Brazil
- Height: 1.83 m (6 ft 0 in)
- Position: Striker

Team information
- Current team: Portuguesa-RJ

Youth career
- SC Atibaia
- 2007: São Paulo

Senior career*
Years	Team	Apps	(Gls)
2007–2011	São Paulo	0	(0)
2008	→ Rio Preto (loan)	21	(14)
2009	→ Toledo (loan)	11	(7)
2010	→ Catanduvense (loan)	4	(0)
2011	→ Paulista (loan)	30	(18)
2011	Paraná	17	(2)
2012	Mogi Mirim	22	(16)
2012	→ Flamengo (loan)	14	(3)
2013–2014	Flamengo	72	(42)
2014–2015	Al Nassr	9	(1)
2015	Sport	17	(4)
2016–2019	Bahia	71	(31)
2018	→ Grêmio (loan)	5	(0)
2018–	→ Sport (loan)	16	(2)
2019–2021	Sport	83	(30)
2021–2022	Confiança	15	(2)
2022	CA Lemense	8	(2)
2022–2023	Brasiliense FC	33	(9)
2024–	Portuguesa-RJ	0	(0)
- * Club domestic league appearances and goals as of 12 November 2023

Hernane Vidal de Souza (born 4 August 1986), simply known as Hernane, is a Brazilian footballer who plays as a striker for Portuguesa-RJ.

== Career ==
Born in Bom Jesus da Lapa, Hernane began his career in SC Atibaia's youth categories, but later moved to São Paulo FC. However, he failed to make his breakthrough in first team, and was subsequently loaned to smaller clubs. In June 2010 he went on a trial at Swedish club Malmö FF.

In August 2011, Hernane left São Paulo and joined Paraná Clube. He scored against Salgueiro AC and AD São Caetano. In November, he agreed to join Mogi Mirim EC in January 2012. In 2012 Campeonato Paulista, he scored sixteen goals in twenty-two games, being the club's topscorer, and being the championship second topscorer, only behind Neymar. He was also selected in the top XI of the competition.

=== Flamengo ===
In June 2012, Hernane joined Flamengo, which bought 10% of his rights from Mogi Mirim, with an option to buy more 40%. He made his debut on 9 June, against Coritiba, getting on the scoresheet.

== Career statistics ==
As of 2 August 2020.

Club	Season	League	League		Cup		Continental		Other		Total	
Club	Season	League	Apps	Goals	Apps	Goals	Apps	Goals	Apps	Goals	Apps	Goals
Paraná	2011	Série B	17	2	—		—		—		17	2
Mogi Mirim	2012	Série D	—		—		—		22	16	22	16
Flamengo (loan)	2012	Série A	14	3	—		—		—		14	3
Flamengo	2013	Série A	31	16	11	8	—		16	12	58	36
Flamengo	2014	Série A	1	0	0	0	4	1	9	5	14	6
Flamengo	Total		32	16	11	8	4	1	25	17	72	42
Al Nassr	2014–15	Professional League	7	1	2	0	—		—		9	1
Sport	2015	Série A	14	2	—		3	2	—		17	4
Bahia	2016	Série B	34	11	2	0	—		12	10	48	21
Bahia	2017	Série A	5	0	2	0	—		15	7	22	7
Bahia	2018	Série A	—		—		—		3	3	3	3
Bahia	Total		39	11	4	0	0	0	30	20	73	31
Grêmio (loan)	2018	Série A	1	0	0	0	0	0	4	0	5	0
Sport (loan)	2018	Série A	16	2	0	0	—		—		16	2
Sport (loan)	2019	Série B	32	14	1	0	—		18	10	51	24
Sport (loan)	2020	Série A	0	0	1	0	—		14	5	15	5
Sport (loan)	Total		48	16	2	0	0	0	32	15	82	41
Career total			172	51	19	8	7	3	113	62	311	130

== Honours ==
Mogi Mirim

- Campeonato Paulista do Interior: 2012

Flamengo

- Copa do Brasil: 2013
- Campeonato Carioca: 2014

Bahia

- Copa do Nordeste: 2017

Grêmio

- Campeonato Gaúcho: 2018

=== Individual ===
- Best Forward of Campeonato Paulista: 2012
