= Alexandre Barroso =

Brazilian association football player (born 1963)

Personal information
- Full name: Alexandre Barroso de Oliveira
- Date of birth: 2 February 1963 (age 63)
- Place of birth: Belo Horizonte, Brazil

Team information
- Current team: Tupi

Managerial career
- Years: Team
- 1997–2001: Cruzeiro (youth)
- 2003: Mamoré
- 2003: Democrata-GV
- 2003–2005: Atlético (youth)
- 2005: Villa Nova
- 2005–2006: Al-Hilal
- 2006–2007: Ipatinga
- 2007: CRB
- 2012: Juventude
- 2013: Villa Nova
- 2014: Cabofriense
- 2015: Mamoré
- 2015: CRB
- 2016: Uberlândia
- 2018–: Tupi

Alexandre Barroso de Oliveira (born 2 February 1963 in Belo Horizonte), known as Alexandre Barroso, is a Brazilian football manager.

== Career ==
Degree in Physical Education from the Federal University of Minas Gerais (UFMG) in 1987, Alexandre Barroso joined the football two years later, assuming the physical preparation of Professional Cruise team, a position he held until 1996. In Fox, was champion of the Cup Brazil, three-time champion of the State Championship and Super Cup champion.

In 1990, experienced a period of experience in Ichirara Midori High School in Japan, returning to its function in mining team in the same year. In 1997, Barroso took the junior team of Cruzeiro, having won eight trophies with the team, two international.

Since 2003 he coached the Mamoré (MG), Democrata (MG), Atlético U20, Villa Nova (MG), Al-Hilal FC, Ipatinga, CRB, Juventude, Cabofriense.

== Honours ==
CRB

- Campeonato Alagoano: 2015
