= Cantarele =

Brazilian footballer (born 1953)

Personal information
- Full name: Antônio Luiz Cantarele
- Date of birth: September 26, 1953 (age 73)
- Place of birth: Além Paraíba, Brazil
- Height: 1.78 m (5 ft 10 in)
- Position: Goalkeeper

Senior career*
Years	Team	Apps	(Gls)
1973–1983	Flamengo	422	(0)
1983	Náutico		
1984–1989	Flamengo	135	(0)
Total		557	(0)
- * Club domestic league appearances and goals

Antônio Luiz Cantarele, usually known as Cantarele (born September 26, 1953 in Além Paraíba, Minas Gerais state), is a retired professional Brazilian footballer who played as a goalkeeper for Campeonato Brasileiro Série A clubs Flamengo and Náutico.

== Career ==
Cantarele started his career playing for Flamengo, where he spent most of his career. Between 1973 and 1983, he won several titles, such as the Campeonato Carioca in 1974, 1978, the two 1979 championships, and 1981, the Campeonato Brasileiro Série A in 1980, 1982 and 1983, Copa Libertadores in 1981, and the Intercontinental Cup in 1981. He briefly played for Náutico of Recife, Pernambuco state in 1983, returning to Flamengo in 1984, where he played until his retirement in 1989, winning the Campeonato Carioca again in 1986 and the Campeonato Brasileiro Série A (Copa União) in 1987.

== Goalkeeper coach career ==
After his retirement, he started working as a goalkeeper coach. He worked for Flamengo, Corinthians, with Vanderlei Luxemburgo, the Japan national team during the 2006 FIFA World Cup, and Fenerbahçe, of Turkey. For Japan and Fenerbahçe, he worked with former Flamengo player Zico.

== Honors ==
Cantarele won the following honors during his playing career:

Club	Competition	Seasons
Flamengo	Campeonato Brasileiro Série A	1980, 1982, 1983, 1987 (Copa União)
Flamengo	Campeonato Carioca	1974, 1978, 1979, 1979 (special competition), 1981, 1986
Flamengo	Copa Libertadores	1981
Flamengo	Intercontinental Cup	1981
