= Danilo Portugal =

Brazilian footballer (born 1983)

Personal information
- Full name: Danilo Portugal Bueno Ferreira
- Date of birth: May 10, 1983 (age 43)
- Place of birth: Goiânia (GO - Brazil)
- Height: 1.78 m (5 ft 10 in)
- Position: Defensive midfielder

Senior career*
Years	Team	Apps	(Gls)
2002–2008	Goiás		
2004	→ Murici (loan)		
2008–2009	Vitória Setúbal		
2009–2010	Ponte Preta		
2010	Fortaleza		
2010	Brasiliense		
2011	CRAC		
2011	Botafogo-SP		
2012	Pelotas		
2012	Goiânia		
2013	Campinense		
2014	Mineiros		
2015	Aparecidense		

Managerial career
- 2016-2018: Atlético Goianiense (U-17)
- 2019: Joinville
- * Club domestic league appearances and goals

Danilo Portugal Bueno Ferreira (born 10 May 1983) is a Brazilian professional football manager and former player.

== Honours ==
Goiás

- Goiás State League: 2003, 2006

Campinense

- Copa do Nordeste: 2013
