= Rafinha (footballer, born April 1993) =

Brazilian footballer

Personal information
- Full name: Rafael Lima Pereira
- Date of birth: 1 April 1993 (age 33)
- Place of birth: Porto Franco, Brazil
- Height: 1.64 m (5 ft 5 in)
- Position: Winger

Team information
- Current team: club The Strongest

Youth career
- Flamengo

Senior career*
Years	Team	Apps	(Gls)
2013–2018	Flamengo	21	(0)
2014	→ Bahia (loan)	19	(0)
2015	→ Atlético Goianiense (loan)	7	(0)
2015	→ Daejeon Citizen (loan)	7	(0)
2016	→ Metropolitano (loan)	15	(1)
2017	→ Thai Honda (loan)	26	(5)
2018	Avaí	0	(0)
2019–	Cafetaleros	0	(0)
- * Club domestic league appearances and goals as of 09:21, 25 December 2018 (UTC)

Rafael Lima Pereira (born 1 April 1993), commonly known as Rafinha is a Brazilian footballer who plays for Mexican club Cafetaleros as a winger.

After graduating from the youth team of Flamengo, Rafinha broke into the first team in 2013. After a series of loan deals, he left the club and joined Avaí in 2018.

== Club career ==
Born in Porto Franco, Rafinha represented CFZ, CFZ Brasília and Flamengo as a youth. After winning the 2011 Copa São Paulo de Futebol Júnior, he was given the nickname "Neymar da Gávea" (Neymar of Gávea). On 27 February 2013, he was promoted to the main team, signing a deal which would keep him at the club till 2018. His contract termination fee was set at R$130 million (approx £26 million at January 2018) for foreign clubs and R$23 million (approx £5m) for Brazilian clubs. He also thanked Zico, saying that he was grateful to him not only as a player but also as a person. Rafinha's monthly salary was increased from R$3,000 (£660) to R$20,000 (£4,400), a salary hike of 566%.

Rafinha scored his first goal for Fla in a 4–2 victory against Vasco da Gama. He played 44 matches in the season with his side winning the 2013 Copa do Brasil.

On 7 January 2014, Rafinha joined Bahia on a year long loan deal, which saw Feijão moving to the opposite side. In the following January he was loaned to Atlético Goianiense after becoming surplus to Flamengo's requirements. He made his Goiano debut against Anapolina, scoring a goal in the 1–0 victory. However, his form dipped since then and he failed to cement his position in the first team; resulting in the club releasing him on 1 July.

On 4 July 2015, Rafinha was loaned to South Korean club Daejon Citizen. On 23 January 2016, he was loaned to Metropolitano. In 2017, he was loaned off again, this time on a six-month deal to Thai club Thai Honda. On 3 January 2018, Rafinha moved to Avaí.

On 24 December 2018, Rafinha moved abroad and joined Mexican club Cafetaleros.

== Career statistics ==
As of match played on 1 April 2018

Club	Season	National League			State League		Cup		Continental		Total	
Club	Season	Division	Apps	Goals	Apps	Goals	Apps	Goals	Apps	Goals	Apps	Goals
Flamengo	2013	Série A	21	0	15	2	7	1	—		43	3
Bahia (loan)	2014	Série A	19	0	6	0	11	3	4 (Note: Appearances in Copa Sudamericana)	0	34	3
Atlético Goianiense (loan)	2015	Série A	7	0	14	3	4	0	—		25	3
Daejeon Citizen (loan)	2015	K League Classic	7	0	—		0	0	—		7	0
Metropolitano (loan)	2016	Catarinense A1	—		15	1	0	0	—		15	1
Thai Honda (loan)	2017	Thai League T1	26	5	—		0	0	—		26	5
Avaí	2018	Série B	0	0	8	0	0	0	—		8	0
Career total			80	5	58	6	22	4	4	0	164	15

== Honours ==
Flamengo

- Copa do Brasil: 2013
