= Diego Silva (footballer, born 1989) =

Brazilian footballer

Personal information
- Full name: Diego Francolino da Silva
- Date of birth: May 9, 1989 (age 37)
- Place of birth: Valparaíso, São Paulo, Brazil
- Height: 1.78 m (5 ft 10 in)
- Position: Defensive midfielder

Team information
- Current team: Marcílio Dias

Senior career*
Years	Team	Apps	(Gls)
2008	Genus		
2008	Operário Ltda.		
2009–2015	XV de Piracicaba	43	(3)
2012	→ Grêmio Barueri (loan)	5	(0)
2013	→ Flamengo (loan)	14	(0)
2014	→ Portuguesa (loan)	14	(0)
2015–2016	Guarani	17	(0)
2016	América RN	5	(0)
2017	Cabofriense	10	(0)
2017	Sampaio Corrêa	22	(2)
2018	Atlético Goianiense	11	(0)
2018–2019	Sampaio Corrêa	13	(0)
2019	Linense	12	(0)
2019	Treze	7	(0)
2020–	Marcílio Dias	37	(1)
- * Club domestic league appearances and goals as of 04:56, 24 March 2022 (UTC)

Diego Francolino da Silva, known as Diego Silva (born 9 May 1989), is a Brazilian footballer who plays for Marcílio Dias as a defensive midfielder.

== Career ==
Born in Bento de Abreu, São Paulo, Diego Silva began his senior career with Genus, but later moved to Operário Ltda. A year later he signed with XV de Piracicaba.

In August 2012 Diego Silva joined Grêmio Barueri on loan until the end of the season. He made his professional debut on 14 August, playing the last 14 minutes of a 2–0 home win over Goiás.

On 2 May 2013 Diego Silva signed with Flamengo, also on loan; he made his Série A debut on 8 June, starting in a 3–0 away success over Criciúma. Diego Silva also appeared in the 2013 Copa do Brasil finals, as a second-half substitute in each leg.

On 8 January 2014 Diego Silva signed on loan with Portuguesa.

== Honours ==
Club

- Campeonato Paulista Série A2: 2011
- Copa do Brasil: 2013
