= 2014 Campeonato Carioca =

Campeonato Carioca
- Season: 2014
- Dates: January 18 – April 13, 2014
- Champions: Flamengo
- Relegated: Audax Rio; Duque de Caxias
- Copa do Brasil: Boavista; Cabofriense; Flamengo; Vasco da Gama
- Série D: Cabofriense
- Matches: 120
- Goals: 326 (2.72 per match)
- Top goalscorer: Edmilson (11 goals)

The 2014 Campeonato Carioca (officially the 2014 Cariocão Guaraviton for sponsorship reasons) was the 113th edition of the top tier of the Campeonato Carioca, organized by FFERJ (Federação de Futebol do Estado do Rio de Janeiro, or Rio de Janeiro State Football Federation). The top four teams not otherwise qualified through national and international tournaments qualified for the 2015 Copa do Brasil. The highest-placed team not otherwise playing in the Campeonato Brasileiro Série A, Série B or Série C qualified for the 2014 Campeonato Brasileiro Série D. This edition of the Campeonato Carioca was played as a single round-robin called the Taça Guanabara followed by two-legged semifinals and a two-legged final. Two teams would be relegated: if there were no other teams with the same number of points as the last- and penultimate-placed teams in the Taça Guanabara, then the last- and penultimate-placed teams would be relegated; if more than two teams tied for fewest or second-fewest points in the Taça Guanabara, then a relegation playoff would be played.

== Participating teams ==
Location of teams in the 2014 Campeonato Carioca
Location of teams in the 2014 Campeonato Carioca – city of Rio de Janeiro

Club	Home city	Manager	2013 Result
Audax Rio de Janeiro Esporte Clube	Rio de Janeiro (Bangu) (Note: Although Audax Rio de Janeiro EC was headquartered in São João de Meriti, it played most home games at Moça Bonita Stadium)	Válber and Júnior Lopes	7th
Bangu Atlético Clube	Rio de Janeiro (Bangu)	Mazolinha and Mário Marques	11th
Boavista Sport Club	Saquarema	Américo Faria	6th
Bonsucesso Futebol Clube	Rio de Janeiro (Bonsucesso)	Ricardo Barreto and Alfredo Sampaio	2nd (Série B)
Botafogo de Futebol e Regatas	Rio de Janeiro (Engenho de Dentro) (Note: Although Botafogo FR is headquartered in Botafogo, it plays home games at Engenhão Stadium)	Eduardo Hungaro	1st
Associação Desportiva Cabofriense	Cabo Frio	Alexandre Barroso	1st (Série B)
Duque de Caxias Futebol Clube	Duque de Caxias	Cesar Diniz, Mário Júnior and Sérgio Farias	13th
Clube de Regatas do Flamengo	Rio de Janeiro (Maracanã) (Note: Although CR Flamengo is headquartered in Lagoa, it plays home games at Maracanã Stadium)	Jaime de Almeida	2nd
Fluminense Football Club	Rio de Janeiro (Maracanã) (Note: Although Fluminense FC is headquartered in Laranjeiras, it plays home games at Maracanã Stadium)	Renato Gaúcho	3rd
Friburguense Atlético Clube	Nova Friburgo	Gérson Andreotti	9th
Macaé Esporte Futebol Clube	Macaé	Paulo Henrique Filho and Josué Teixeira	12th
Madureira Esporte Clube	Rio de Janeiro (Madureira)	Antônio Carlos Roy	8th
Nova Iguaçu Futebol Clube	Nova Iguaçu	Édson Souza	14th
Resende Futebol Clube	Resende	Paulo Campos and Aílton Ferraz	5th
Club de Regatas Vasco da Gama	Rio de Janeiro (Vasco da Gama)	Adílson Batista	4th
Volta Redonda Futebol Clube	Volta Redonda	Tarcísio Pugliese and Toninho Andrade	10th

== First phase (Taça Guanabara) ==
Pos	Team	Pld	W	D	L	GF	GA	GD	Pts	Qualification or relegation
1	Flamengo	15	12	2	1	36	16	+20	38	Advanced to the Semifinals
2	Fluminense	15	9	4	2	31	16	+15	31	Advanced to the Semifinals
3	Vasco da Gama	15	8	5	2	31	11	+20	29	Advanced to the Semifinals
4	Cabofriense	15	7	4	4	21	20	+1	25	Advanced to the Semifinals
5	Boavista	15	7	4	4	20	21	−1	25	
6	Friburguense	15	6	4	5	18	24	−6	22	
7	Macaé	15	5	4	6	22	20	+2	19	
8	Nova Iguaçu	15	4	7	4	20	19	+1	19	
9	Botafogo	15	4	5	6	16	17	−1	17	
10	Bangu	15	4	5	6	15	19	−4	17	
11	Volta Redonda	15	4	5	6	15	19	−4	17	
12	Madureira	15	4	3	8	19	24	−5	15	
13	Bonsucesso	15	3	6	6	15	18	−3	15	
14	Resende	15	3	6	6	20	24	−4	15	
15	Audax Rio	15	2	5	8	13	27	−14	11	Relegation to Série B
16	Duque de Caxias	15	2	3	10	14	31	−17	9	Relegation to Série B

Updated to match(es) played on March 23, 2014. Source: GloboEsporte.com
Rules for classification: 1st points; 2nd wins; 3rd goal difference; 4th goals scored; 5th head-to-head results; 6th least red cards received; 7th least yellow cards received; 8th draw.

== Final Stage ==
Semi-finals
Flamengo	3	3	6
Cabofriense	0	1	1
Fluminense	1	0	1
Vasco da Gama	1	1	2

Finals
Flamengo	1	1	2
Vasco da Gama	1	1	2

=== Semi-finals ===
==== First leg ====
26 March
22:00 UTC-03:00

Cabofriense	0 – 3	Flamengo
	Report	Éverton 17'; Paulinho 50'; Alecsandro 73'

Maracanã, Rio de Janeiro
Attendance: 3,625
Referee: Grazianni Maciel Rocha

27 March
21:00 UTC-03:00

Vasco da Gama	1 – 1	Fluminense
Thalles 66'	Report	Fred 55'

Maracanã, Rio de Janeiro
Attendance: 9,976
Referee: Wagner do Nascimento Magalhães

==== Second leg ====
29 March
18:30 UTC-03:00

Flamengo	3 – 1	Cabofriense
Mugni 8', 18'; João Paulo 64'	Report	Éberson 75'

Maracanã, Rio de Janeiro
Attendance: 5,977
Referee: Rodrigo Carvalhaes de Miranda

30 March
16:00 UTC-03:00

Fluminense	0 – 1	Vasco da Gama
	Report	Edmilson 44'

Maracanã, Rio de Janeiro
Attendance: 15,925
Referee: Marcelo de Lima Henrique

=== Finals ===
6 April
16:00 UTC-03:00

Vasco da Gama	1 – 1	Flamengo
Rodrigo 11'	Report	Paulinho 60'

Maracanã, Rio de Janeiro
Attendance: 20,844
Referee: Rodrigo Nunes de Sá

Vasco	Flamengo

13 April
16:00 UTC-03:00

Flamengo	1 – 1	Vasco da Gama
Márcio Araújo 90+1'	Report	Douglas 75' (pen.)

Maracanã, Rio de Janeiro
Attendance: 42,697
Referee: Marcelo de Lima Henrique

Flamengo	Vasco
