= 2014 CR Flamengo season =

Flamengo
2014 season
- Chairman: Eduardo Bandeira de Mello
- Manager: Jayme de Almeida (until 12 May); Ney Franco (13 May – 23 July); Vanderlei Luxemburgo (from 24 July)
- Brazilian Série A: 10th
- Rio de Janeiro State League: Champions
- Copa do Brasil: Semifinals
- Copa Libertadores: Group Stage
- Top goalscorer: League: Eduardo da Silva (8 goals); All: Alecsandro (21 goals)
- Highest home attendance: 60,451 (vs. León in the Copa Libertadores)
- Lowest home attendance: 997 (vs. Bangu in the Rio de Janeiro State League)
Home colours	Away colours	Third colours

The 2014 season is the 119th year in the club's history, the 103rd season in Clube de Regatas do Flamengo's football existence, and their 44th in the Brazilian Série A, having never been relegated from the top division.

== Club ==
=== First-team staff ===
As of August 12, 2014.

Position	Name
Coach	Vanderlei Luxemburgo
Executive Director	Felipe Ximenes
Assistant coach	Deivid de Souza
Goalkeeping coach	Wagner Miranda
Fitness coaches	Antônio Mello
Fitness coaches	Marcelo Martorelli
Fitness coaches	Daniel Félix
Fitness coaches	Marcos Lima
Medical staff manager	José Luiz Runco
Doctors	Marcelo Soares
Doctors	Luiz Claudio Baldi
Doctors	Marcio Tannure
Physiotherapists	Fabiano Bastos
Physiotherapists	Mario Peixoto
Physiologist	Claudio Pavanelli

=== Other information ===
Chairman	Eduardo Bandeira de Mello
Ground (capacity and dimensions)	Estádio do Maracanã (78,838 / 105×68 meters)

Source: CBF

=== First-team squad ===
As of October 12, 2014

Note: Flags indicate national team as defined under FIFA eligibility rules; some limited exceptions apply. Players may hold more than one non-FIFA nationality.

No.	Pos.	Nation	Player
1	GK	BRA	Felipe
2	DF	BRA	Leonardo Moura (captain)
3	DF	BRA	Chicão
4	DF	BRA	Samir
5	MF	PAR	Víctor Cáceres
6	DF	ECU	Frickson Erazo
8	MF	BRA	Márcio Araújo
9	FW	BRA	Élton (on loan from Corinthians)
10	MF	ARG	Lucas Mugni
11	FW	BRA	Negueba
13	DF	BRA	Marcelo
14	DF	BRA	Wallace (vice-captain)
15	MF	BRA	Muralha
16	DF	BRA	João Paulo (on loan from Mogi Mirim)
17	MF	BRA	Gabriel
18	FW	BRA	Igor Sartori
19	FW	BRA	Alecsandro

No.	Pos.	Nation	Player
20	MF	ARG	Héctor Canteros
21	DF	BRA	Léo
22	MF	BRA	Éverton
23	FW	CRO	Eduardo da Silva
25	MF	BRA	Luiz Antônio
26	FW	BRA	Paulinho
29	FW	BRA	Nixon
30	MF	BRA	Recife
31	MF	BRA	Mattheus
33	DF	BRA	Rodrigo Frauches
35	DF	BRA	Fernando
36	DF	BRA	Anderson Pico
37	GK	BRA	César
39	FW	BRA	Arthur (on loan from Londrina)
40	MF	BRA	Amaral
48	GK	BRA	Paulo Victor
50	GK	BRA	João Paulo Kuspiosz

Players with Dual Nationality

- (Argentina) (Spain) Lucas Mugni
- (Croatia) (Brazil) Eduardo da Silva
- (Brazil) (Portugal) Mattheus
- (Brazil) (Italy) Paulo Victor

=== Out on loan ===
Note: Flags indicate national team as defined under FIFA eligibility rules; some limited exceptions apply. Players may hold more than one non-FIFA nationality.

No.	Pos.	Nation	Player
—	DF	BRA	Digão (loan to América-RN)
—	DF	BRA	Renato Santos (loan to América-MG)
—	DF	BRA	Welinton (loan to Coritiba)
—	MF	BRA	Val (loan to América-RN)
—	MF	BRA	Adryan (loan to Leeds United)
—	FW	BRA	Bruninho (loan to América-MG)

No.	Pos.	Nation	Player
—	MF	BRA	Guilherme Camacho (loan to Guaratinguetá)
—	MF	BRA	Rodolfo (loan to Ponte Preta)
—	FW	BRA	Rafinha (loan to Bahia)
—	FW	BRA	Lucas Quintino (loan to Nacional-PR)
—	FW	BRA	Thomás (loan to Ponte Preta)

== Transfers ==
=== In ===
Note: Flags indicate national team as defined under FIFA eligibility rules; some limited exceptions apply. Players may hold more than one non-FIFA nationality.

No.	Pos.	Nation	Player
—	FW	BRA	Guilherme Negueba (loan return from São Paulo)
—	MF	BRA	Muralha (loan return from Portuguesa)
—	DF	BRA	Léo (transfer from Vitória)
—	MF	BRA	Éverton (transfer from Tigres UANL)
—	FW	BRA	Alecsandro (free transfer)
—	MF	BRA	Elano (loan from Grêmio)
—	DF	ECU	Frickson Erazo (transfer from Barcelona SC)
—	MF	ARG	Lucas Mugni (transfer from Colón)

No.	Pos.	Nation	Player
—	MF	BRA	Márcio Araújo (free transfer)
—	DF	BRA	Marcelo (transfer from Volta Redonda)
—	FW	BRA	Arthur (loan from Londrina)
—	MF	ARG	Héctor Canteros (transfer from Vélez Sarsfield)
—	FW	CRO	Eduardo da Silva (free transfer)
—	FW	BRA	Thomás (loan return from A.C. Siena)
—	FW	BRA	Élton (loan from Corinthians)
—	DF	BRA	Anderson Pico (free transfer)

=== Out ===
Note: Flags indicate national team as defined under FIFA eligibility rules; some limited exceptions apply. Players may hold more than one non-FIFA nationality.

No.	Pos.	Nation	Player
—	DF	CHI	Marcos González (released)
—	DF	BRA	Welinton (loan to Coritiba)
—	FW	BRA	Hernane (transfer to Al Nassr FC)
—	MF	BRA	Elano (loan return to Grêmio)

No.	Pos.	Nation	Player
—	DF	BRA	André Santos (released)
—	GK	BRA	Luan (transfer to Figueirense)
—	FW	BRA	Thomás (loan to Ponte Preta)

== Statistics ==
=== Appearances and goals ===
Last updated on January 5, 2015.

- Players in italic have left the club during the season.

No.	Pos	Nat	Player	Total		Rio State League		Copa do Brasil		Copa Libertadores		Série A	
No.	Pos	Nat	Player	Apps	Goals	Apps	Goals	Apps	Goals	Apps	Goals	Apps	Goals
1	GK	(Brazil) BRA	Felipe	29	0	15	0	0	0	6	0	8	0
2	DF	(Brazil) BRA	Leonardo Moura	50	1	9	0	3+1	0	4	0	33	1
3	DF	(Brazil) BRA	Chicão	27	1	5	0	3	1	0+1	0	14+4	0
4	DF	(Brazil) BRA	Samir	39	2	10+1	1	5	0	6	0	17	1
5	MF	(Paraguay) PAR	Víctor Cáceres	34	2	7	0	4	1	3	1	20	0
6	DF	(Ecuador) ECU	Frickson Erazo	7	0	4+1	0	0	0	0	0	1+1	0
7	MF	(Brazil) BRA	Elano	15	3	7	2	0	0	4	1	3+1	0
8	MF	(Brazil) BRA	Márcio Araújo	47	3	7+2	1	6	0	0	0	31+1	2
9	FW	(Brazil) BRA	Hernane	14	6	9	5	0	0	4	1	1	0
9	FW	(Brazil) BRA	Élton	13	2	0	0	0+1	0	0	0	4+8	2
10	MF	(Argentina) ARG	Lucas Mugni	39	5	7+2	3	1+1	0	2+1	0	10+15	2
11	FW	(Brazil) BRA	Guilherme Negueba	23	2	4+6	2	0	0	0+2	0	3+8	0
13	DF	(Brazil) BRA	Welinton	3	2	2	2	0	0	1	0	0	0
13	DF	(Brazil) BRA	Marcelo	20	1	0	0	3	0	0	0	16+1	1
14	DF	(Brazil) BRA	Wallace	50	1	12	0	1	0	6	0	31	1
15	MF	(Brazil) BRA	Muralha	27	0	9+3	0	0+1	0	5+1	0	3+5	0
16	DF	(Brazil) BRA	João Paulo	44	1	8+1	1	5	0	2	0	24+4	0
17	MF	(Brazil) BRA	Gabriel	47	9	8+8	4	3+2	2	3+2	0	10+11	3
18	FW	(Brazil) BRA	Igor Sartori	8	0	1+2	0	0	0	0	0	0+5	0
19	FW	(Brazil) BRA	Alecsandro	46	21	7+6	10	3	2	2+4	2	24	7
20	MF	(Brazil) BRA	Carlos Eduardo	7	0	3+2	0	0	0	1+1	0	0	0
20	MF	(Argentina) ARG	Héctor Canteros	30	3	0	0	5+1	1	0	0	23+1	2
21	DF	(Brazil) BRA	Léo	11	2	4+2	2	1	0	1	0	2+1	0
22	MF	(Brazil) BRA	Éverton	49	10	8+1	2	4+2	1	6	3	28	4
23	MF	(Brazil) BRA	Feijão	6	0	3+2	0	0	0	0+1	0	0	0
23	FW	(Croatia) CRO	Eduardo da Silva	24	9	0	0	4+2	1	0	0	10+8	8
25	MF	(Brazil) BRA	Luiz Antônio	37	2	4+1	1	2+3	0	0	0	20+7	1
26	FW	(Brazil) BRA	Paulinho	30	6	9+1	3	1+1	0	2+3	1	13	2
27	DF	(Brazil) BRA	André Santos	21	1	9	0	0	0	4	1	8	0
28	MF	(Brazil) BRA	Rodolfo	5	0	3+2	0	0	0	0	0	0	0
29	FW	(Brazil) BRA	Nixon	29	9	3+5	3	2+2	0	0+1	0	10+6	6
30	MF	(Brazil) BRA	Recife	9	0	1+1	0	0	0	0+1	0	5+1	0
31	MF	(Brazil) BRA	Mattheus	8	0	2+3	0	0+1	0	0	0	0+2	0
32	DF	(Brazil) BRA	Digão	5	0	5	0	0	0	0	0	0	0
33	DF	(Brazil) BRA	Rodrigo Frauches	5	0	4+1	0	0	0	0	0	0	0
35	DF	(Brazil) BRA	Fernando	2	0	1	0	0	0	0	0	0+1	0
36	MF	(Brazil) BRA	Bruninho	1	0	0+1	0	0	0	0	0	0	0
36	DF	(Brazil) BRA	Anderson Pico	9	1	0	0	0	0	0	0	8+1	1
37	GK	(Brazil) BRA	César	1	0	0	0	0	0	0	0	1	0
38	GK	(Brazil) BRA	Luan	1	0	1	0	0	0	0	0	0	0
39	FW	(Brazil) BRA	Arthur	12	0	0	0	0	0	0	0	4+8	0
40	MF	(Brazil) BRA	Amaral	30	0	10	0	1+1	0	4	0	8+6	0
48	GK	(Brazil) BRA	Paulo Victor	38	0	3	0	6	0	0	0	29	0
50	GK	(Brazil) BRA	João Paulo Kuspiosz	0	0	0	0	0	0	0	0	0	0
53	GK	(Brazil) BRA	Daniel	1	0	0	0	0	0	0	0	0+1	0
	DF	(Chile) CHI	Marcos González	1	0	1	0	0	0	0	0	0	0
	MF	(Brazil) BRA	Val	2	0	2	0	0	0	0	0	0	0
	FW	(Brazil) BRA	Douglas Baggio	1	0	0+1	0	0	0	0	0	0	0

=== Top scorers ===
Includes all competitive matches

Rank	Nation	Number	Name	Rio State League	Copa do Brasil	Copa Libertadores	Série A	Total
1	(Brazil)	19	Alecsandro	10	2	2	7	21
2	(Brazil)	17	Gabriel	4	2	0	4	10
2	(Brazil)	22	Éverton	2	1	3	4	10
3	(Croatia)	23	Eduardo da Silva	0	1	0	8	9
3	(Brazil)	29	Nixon	3	0	0	6	9
4	(Brazil)	26	Paulinho	3	0	1	2	6
4	(Brazil)	9	Hernane	5	0	1	0	6
5	(Argentina)	10	Lucas Mugni	3	0	0	2	5
6	(Brazil)	8	Márcio Araújo	1	0	0	2	3
6	(Brazil)	7	Elano	2	0	1	0	3
7	(Argentina)	20	Héctor Canteros	0	0	0	2	2
7	(Brazil)	9	Élton	0	0	0	2	2
7	(Brazil)	4	Samir	1	0	0	1	2
7	(Brazil)	25	Luiz Antônio	1	0	0	1	2
7	(Paraguay)	5	Víctor Cáceres	0	1	1	0	2
7	(Brazil)	11	Guilherme Negueba	2	0	0	0	2
7	(Brazil)	21	Léo	2	0	0	0	2
7	(Brazil)	13	Welinton	2	0	0	0	2
8	(Brazil)	2	Leonardo Moura	0	0	0	1	1
8	(Brazil)	36	Anderson Pico	0	0	0	1	1
8	(Brazil)	13	Marcelo	0	0	0	1	1
8	(Brazil)	14	Wallace	0	0	0	1	1
8	(Brazil)	3	Chicão	0	1	0	0	1
8	(Brazil)	27	André Santos	0	0	1	0	1
8	(Brazil)	16	João Paulo	1	0	0	0	1
			Own Goal	2	0	0	2	3
			Total	44	8	10	46	108

=== Clean sheets ===
Includes all competitive matches

Position	Nation	Number	Name	Rio State League	Copa do Brasil	Copa Libertadores	Série A	Total
GK	(Brazil)	1	Felipe	4	0	0	1	5
GK	(Brazil)	37	César	0	0	0	0	0
GK	(Brazil)	38	Luan	0	0	0	0	0
GK	(Brazil)	48	Paulo Victor	3	4	0	10	17
GK	(Brazil)	50	João Paulo Kuspiosz	0	0	0	0	0
			Total	7	4	0	11	22

=== Disciplinary record ===
Position	Nation	Number	Name	Rio State League		Copa do Brasil		Copa Libertadores		Série A		Total	
Position	Nation	Number	Name	Booked	Sent off (straight red)	Booked	Sent off (straight red)	Booked	Sent off (straight red)	Booked	Sent off (straight red)	Booked	Sent off (straight red)
GK	(Brazil)	1	Felipe	2	0	0	0	1	0	0	0	3	0
DF	(Brazil)	2	Leonardo Moura	2	0	0	0	1	0	5	1	8	1
DF	(Brazil)	3	Chicão	1	1	2	0	0	0	3	1	7	2
DF	(Brazil)	4	Samir	1	0	1	0	1	0	2	0	5	0
MF	(Paraguay)	5	Víctor Cáceres	1	0	2	0	1	0	10	1	14	1
DF	(Ecuador)	6	Frickson Erazo	2	1	0	0	0	0	0	0	2	1
MF	(Brazil)	7	Elano	1	0	0	0	0	0	2	0	3	0
MF	(Brazil)	8	Márcio Araújo	0	0	1	0	0	0	2	0	3	0
FW	(Brazil)	9	Hernane	0	0	1	0	0	0	0	0	1	0
MF	(Argentina)	10	Lucas Mugni	0	0	0	0	1	0	2	0	3	0
MF	(Brazil)	11	Guilherme Negueba	1	0	0	0	1	0	1	0	3	0
DF	(Brazil)	13	Welinton	1	0	1	1	0	0	0	0	2	1
DF	(Brazil)	13	Marcelo	0	0	1	0	0	0	2	0	3	0
DF	(Brazil)	14	Wallace	1	0	1	0	2	0	4	0	8	0
MF	(Brazil)	15	Muralha	3	0	0	0	1	0	1	0	5	0
MF	(Brazil)	16	João Paulo	0	0	0	0	0	0	3	0	3	0
MF	(Brazil)	17	Gabriel	3	0	0	0	0	0	1	0	4	0
MF	(Brazil)	18	Igor Sartori	0	0	0	0	0	0	0	0	0	0
FW	(Brazil)	19	Alecsandro	1	0	1	0	0	0	6	0	8	0
MF	(Brazil)	20	Carlos Eduardo	0	0	0	0	0	0	0	0	0	0
MF	(Argentina)	20	Héctor Canteros	0	0	1	0	0	0	6	0	7	0
DF	(Brazil)	21	Léo	1	0	0	0	0	0	3	0	4	0
MF	(Brazil)	22	Éverton	3	0	3	0	1	0	5	0	12	0
MF	(Brazil)	23	Feijão	1	0	0	0	1	0	0	0	2	0
FW	(Croatia)	23	Eduardo da Silva	0	0	0	0	0	0	0	0	0	0
MF	(Brazil)	25	Luiz Antônio	1	0	0	0	0	0	2	0	3	0
FW	(Brazil)	26	Paulinho	0	0	0	0	0	0	1	0	1	0
DF	(Brazil)	27	André Santos	4	0	0	0	3	0	2	0	9	0
MF	(Brazil)	28	Rodolfo	0	0	0	0	0	0	0	0	0	0
DF	(Brazil)	29	Nixon	0	0	0	0	0	0	0	0	0	0
MF	(Brazil)	30	Recife	0	0	0	0	0	0	0	0	0	0
MF	(Brazil)	31	Mattheus	0	0	0	0	0	0	0	0	0	0
DF	(Brazil)	32	Digão	1	0	0	0	0	0	0	0	1	0
DF	(Brazil)	33	Rodrigo Frauches	1	0	0	0	0	0	0	0	1	0
DF	(Brazil)	35	Fernando	0	0	0	0	0	0	0	0	0	0
MF	(Brazil)	36	Bruninho	0	0	0	0	0	0	0	0	0	0
DF	(Brazil)	36	Anderson Pico	0	0	0	0	0	0	0	0	0	0
GK	(Brazil)	37	César	0	0	0	0	0	0	0	1	0	1
GK	(Brazil)	38	Luan	0	0	0	0	0	0	0	0	0	0
FW	(Brazil)	39	Arthur	0	0	0	0	0	0	0	0	0	0
MF	(Brazil)	40	Amaral	0	0	1	0	1	1	5	0	7	1
GK	(Brazil)	48	Paulo Victor	0	0	0	0	0	0	1	0	1	0
GK	(Brazil)	50	João Paulo Kuspiosz	0	0	0	0	0	0	0	0	0	0
DF	(Chile)		Marcos González	0	0	0	0	0	0	0	0	0	0
MF	(Brazil)		Val	0	0	0	0	0	0	0	0	0	0
FW	(Brazil)		Douglas Baggio	0	0	0	0	0	0	0	0	0	0
			Total	32	2	16	1	15	1	69	4	133	8

=== Overview ===
Competition	First match	Last match	Starting round	Final position	Record							
Competition	First match	Last match	Starting round	Final position	Pld	W	D	L	GF	GA	GD	Win %
Série A	20 April 2014	7 December 2014	Matchday 1	10th	38	14	10	14	46	47	−1	36.84
Copa do Brasil	27 August 2014	5 November 2014	Round of 16	Semifinals	6	4	0	2	8	6	+2	66.67
Campeonato Carioca	19 January 2014	13 April 2014	Matchday 1	Winners	19	14	4	1	44	19	+25	73.68
Copa Libertadores	12 February 2014	9 April 2014	Group stage	Groupe stage	6	2	1	3	10	10	+0	33.33
Total					69	34	15	20	108	82	+26	49.28

Source: Competitions

== Competitions ==
=== Campeonato Carioca ===
==== First phase (Taça Guanabara) ====
Pos	Team	Pld	W	D	L	GF	GA	GD	Pts	Qualification or relegation
1	Flamengo	15	12	2	1	36	16	+20	38	Advanced to the Semifinals
2	Fluminense	15	9	4	2	31	16	+15	31	Advanced to the Semifinals
3	Vasco da Gama	15	8	5	2	31	11	+20	29	Advanced to the Semifinals
4	Cabofriense	15	7	4	4	21	20	+1	25	Advanced to the Semifinals
5	Boavista	15	7	4	4	20	21	−1	25	

Updated to match(es) played on March 23, 2014. Source: GloboEsporte.com
Rules for classification: 1st points; 2nd wins; 3rd goal difference; 4th goals scored; 5th head-to-head results; 6th least red cards received; 7th least yellow cards received; 8th draw.

==== Matches ====
19 January 1	Flamengo	1–0	Audax Rio	Rio de Janeiro
17:00 UTC−03:00	Welinton 5'			Stadium: Estádio do Maracanã; Attendance: 12.829; Referee: Philip Georg Bennett

23 January 2	Volta Redonda	0–1	Flamengo	Volta Redonda
22:00 UTC−03:00			Welinton 85'	Stadium: Estádio Raulino de Oliveira; Attendance: 3.413; Referee: Philip Georg Bennett

25 January 3	Flamengo	2–2	Duque de Caxias	Rio de Janeiro
19:30 UTC−03:00	Rodrigues 27'; Alex Terra 47'		Alecsandro 69'; Gabriel 72'	Stadium: Estádio do Maracanã; Attendance: 13.528; Referee: Carlos Eduardo Nunes Braga

29 January 4	Friburguense	0–2	Flamengo	Nova Friburgo
17:00 UTC−03:00			Samir 37'; Elano 68'	Stadium: Estádio Eduardo Guinle; Attendance: 3.975; Referee: Grazianni Maciel Rocha

2 February 5	Flamengo	5–2	Macaé	Volta Redonda
17:00 UTC−03:00	Hernane 14', 25', 44', 52'; Negueba 89'		Marquinho 39'; Waldir 86'	Stadium: Estádio Raulino de Oliveira; Attendance: 3.359; Referee: Eduardo Cordeiro Guimarães

5 February 6	Boavista	2–5	Flamengo	Rio de Janeiro
17:00 UTC−03:00	André Luis 14'; Thiago Silva 18'		Alecsandro 26', 55' (pen.), 59'; Gabriel 28'; Léo 68'	Stadium: Estádio Moça Bonita; Attendance: 1.286; Referee: João Batista de Arruda

8 February 7	Flamengo	0–3	Fluminense	Rio de Janeiro
19:30 UTC−03:00			Michael 28'; Elivelton 48'; Walter 48'	Stadium: Estádio do Maracanã; Attendance: 18.109; Referee: Philip Georg Bennett

16 February 8	Vasco da Gama	2–1	Flamengo	Rio de Janeiro
17:00 UTC−03:00			Michael 28'; Elivelton 48'; Walter 48'	Stadium: Estádio do Maracanã; Attendance: 16.972; Referee: Eduardo Cordeiro Guimarães

20 February 9	Flamengo	2–0	Madureira	Rio de Janeiro
22:00 UTC−03:00			Leozão 11' (o.g.); Negueba 39'	Stadium: Estádio do Maracanã; Attendance: 3.376; Referee: Rodrigo Nubnes de Sá

22 February 10	Resende	0–3	Flamengo	Volta Redonda
19:30 UTC−03:00			Alecsandro 22', 34'; Éverton 69'	Stadium: Estádio Raulino de Oliveira; Attendance: 2.792; Referee: Pathrice Wallace Correa Maia

1 March 11	Flamengo	2–1	Nova Iguaçu	Rio de Janeiro
19:30 UTC−03:00	Erick Foca 66'		Jorge Fellipe 18' (o.g.); Hernane 55'	Stadium: Estádio do Maracanã; Attendance: 13.845; Referee: Rodrigo Nubnes de Sá

6 March 12	Bonsucesso	0–2	Flamengo	Volta Redonda
22:00 UTC−03:00			Alecsandro 71'; Nixon 75'	Stadium: Estádio Raulino de Oliveira; Attendance: 450; Referee: Raphael Silvano Ferreira Silva

9 March 13	Botafogo	0–2	Flamengo	Rio de Janeiro
19:30 UTC-03:00			Gabriel 10'; Léo 90'	Stadium: Estádio do Maracanã; Attendance: 12.648; Referee: Daniel de Sousa Macedo

16 March 14	Flamengo	2–2	Bangu	Volta Redonda
22:00 UTC−03:00	Nixon 59', 65'		Willen 44'; Christiano 48'	Stadium: Estádio Raulino de Oliveira; Attendance: 997; Referee: João Ennio Sobral

23 March 15	Flamengo	5–3	Cabofriense	Rio de Janeiro
17:00 UTC-03:00	Alecsandro 16', 74'; Paulinho 23'; Mugni 45+1'; Luiz Antônio 46'		Éberson 58', 62'; Fabrício Carvalho 87'	Stadium: Estádio do Maracanã; Attendance: 6.598; Referee: Wagner dos Santos Rosa

=== Semifinals ===
26 March First leg	Cabofriense	0–3	Flamengo	Rio de Janeiro
22:00 UTC-03:00		Report	Éverton 17'; Paulinho 50'; Alecsandro 73'	Stadium: Estádio do Maracanã; Attendance: 3.625; Referee: Grazianni Maciel Rocha

29 March Second leg	Flamengo	3–1 (6–1 agg.)	Cabofriense	Rio de Janeiro
18:30 UTC-03:00	Mugni 8', 18'; João Paulo 64'	Report	Éberson 75'	Stadium: Estádio do Maracanã; Attendance: 5.977; Referee: Rodrigo Carvalhaes de Miranda

=== Final ===
6 April First leg	Vasco da Gama	1–1	Flamengo	Rio de Janeiro
16:00 UTC-03:00	Rodrigo 11'	Report	Paulinho 60'	Stadium: Estádio do Maracanã; Attendance: 20.844; Referee: Rodrigo Nunes de Sá

13 April Second leg	Flamengo	1–1 (2–2 agg.)	Vasco da Gama	Rio de Janeiro
16:00 UTC-03:00	Márcio Araújo 90+1'	Report	Douglas 75' (pen.)	Stadium: Estádio do Maracanã; Attendance: 42.697; Referee: Marcelo de Lima Henrique

=== Copa do Brasil ===
==== Round of 16 ====
27 August First leg	Coritiba	3–0	Flamengo	Curitiba
21:50 UTC−03:00	Leandro Almeida 61'; Luiz Antônio 61' (o.g.); Zé Eduardo 90' (pen.)			Stadium: Estádio Couto Pereira; Attendance: 10.798; Referee: Marcelo Aparecido Ribeiro De Souza

3 September Second leg	Flamengo	3–0 (3–3 agg.) (3–2 p)	Coritiba	Rio de Janeiro
21:50 UTC−03:00	Alecsandro 45+3' (pen.), 56' (pen.); Eduardo 80'			Stadium: Estádio do Maracanã; Attendance: 20.450; Referee: Wagner Reway
	Penalties
	Alecsandro (penalty missed); Chicão (penalty scored); João Paulo (penalty missed); Eduardo (penalty scored); Léo Moura (penalty missed); Canteros (penalty scored)		(penalty missed) Zé Eduardo; (penalty missed) Helder; (penalty scored) Robinho; (penalty scored) Leandro Almeida; (penalty missed) Dudu; (penalty missed) Carlinhos

==== Quarterfinals ====
1 October First leg	América (RN)	0–1	Flamengo	Natal
21:50 UTC−03:00			Gabriel 46'	Stadium: Arena das Dunas; Attendance: 30.575; Referee: Héber Lopes

15 October Second leg	Flamengo	1–0 (2–0 agg.)	América (RN)	Rio de Janeiro
21:50 UTC−03:00	Gabriel 63'			Stadium: Estádio do Maracanã; Attendance: 42.406; Referee: Elmo Alves Resende Cunha

==== Semifinals ====
29 October First leg	Flamengo	2–0	Atlético Mineiro	Rio de Janeiro
21:50 UTC−03:00	Cáceres 60'; Chicão 78' (pen.)			Stadium: Estádio do Maracanã; Attendance: 45.642; Referee: Luiz Flávio de Oliveira

5 November Second leg	Atlético Mineiro	4–1 (4–3 agg.)	Flamengo	Belo Horizonte
21:50 UTC−03:00	Carlos 42'; Maicosuel 57'; Dátolo 81'; Luan 85'		Éverton 34'	Stadium: Estádio Mineirão; Attendance: 41.352; Referee: Anderson Daronco

==== Average attendances ====
Includes all home matches in the 2014 Copa do Brasil.

Stadium	Matches	Average	Highest attendance	Lowest attendance
Estádio do Maracanã	3	36.166	45.642	20.450
Total	3	36.166	45.642	20.450

=== Série A ===
==== League table ====
Pos	Team	Pld	W	D	L	GF	GA	GD	Pts	Qualification or relegation
8	Atlético Paranaense	38	15	9	14	43	42	+1	54	2015 Copa Sudamericana second stage (Note: Teams that will entry in 2015 Copa Sudamericana if they do not reach 2015 Copa do Brasil round of 16. Also the 2014 Copa Verde champion (Brasília FC) and the 2015 Copa do Nordeste champion (Ceará) have a berth guaranteed.)
9	Santos	38	15	8	15	42	35	+7	53	2015 Copa Sudamericana second stage
10	Flamengo	38	14	10	14	46	47	−1	52	2015 Copa Sudamericana second stage
11	Sport	38	14	10	14	36	46	−10	52	2015 Copa Sudamericana second stage
12	Goiás	38	13	8	17	38	40	−2	47	2015 Copa Sudamericana second stage

Updated to match(es) played on unknown. Source: Soccerway.com
Rules for classification: 1) points; 2) wins; 3) goal difference; 4) goals scored; 5) head-to-head results; 6) least red cards received; 7) least yellow cards received; 8) draw.

==== Results summary ====
Overall								Home						Away					
Pld	W	D	L	GF	GA	GD	Pts	W	D	L	GF	GA	GD	W	D	L	GF	GA	GD
38	14	10	14	46	47	−1	52	10	5	4	29	15	+14	4	5	10	17	32	−15

Last updated: 5 January 2015.
Source: 2014 Série A

Pld=Matches played; W=Matches won; D=Matches drawn; L=Matches lost;

==== Results by round ====
Round	1	2	3	4	5	6	7	8	9	10	11	12	13	14	15	16	17	18	19	20	21	22	23	24	25	26	27	28	29	30	31	32	33	34	35	36	37	38
Ground	H	A	H	A	H	H	A	H	A	H	A	H	A	H	A	H	A	A	H	A	H	A	H	A	A	H	A	H	A	H	A	H	A	H	A	H	H	A
Result	D	L	W	L	L	D	D	D	L	L	L	W	L	W	W	W	W	W	L	L	W	D	D	D	L	L	W	W	L	W	L	W	D	W	L	D	W	D
Position	9	17	9	16	16	16	16	17	19	20	20	18	20	19	14	13	11	9	10	12	10	10	11	10	12	13	11	10	11	10	11	10	11	8	10	9	9	10

Source: Matches
A = Away; H = Home; W = Win; D = Draw; L = Loss

==== Average attendances ====
Includes all home matches in the 2014 Série A.

Stadium	Matches	Average	Highest attendance	Lowest attendance
Estádio do Maracanã	13	37.562	59.680	21.082
Estádio Cláudio Moacyr	2	8.808	10.924	6.692
Estádio Nacional Mané Garrincha	1	19.012	19.012	19.012
Estádio do Morumbi	1	4.579	4.579	4.579
Estádio Castelão	1	27.753	27.753	27.753
Arena da Amazônia	1	17.860	17.860	17.860
Total	19	30.270	575,126	

==== Matches ====
20 April 1	Flamengo	0–0	Goiás	Brasília
18:30 UTC−03:00				Stadium: Estádio Nacional Mané Garrincha; Attendance: 19.012; Referee: Anderson Daronco

27 April 2	Corinthians	2–0	Flamengo	São Paulo
16:00 UTC−03:00	Guilherme 9'; Gil 80'			Stadium: Estádio do Pacaembú; Attendance: 39.168; Referee: Leandro Pedro Vuaden

4 May 3	Flamengo	4–2	Palmeiras	Rio de Janeiro
18:30 UTC−03:00	Paulinho 14'; Araújo 50'; Alecsandro 60', 73'		Wesley 11'; Henrique 31'	Stadium: Estádio do Maracanã; Attendance: 21.082; Referee: Paulo Henrique de Godoy Bezerra

11 May 4	Fluminense	2–0	Flamengo	Rio de Janeiro
16:00 UTC−03:00	Fred 11'; Chiquinho 87'			Stadium: Estádio do Maracanã; Attendance: 30.766; Referee: Wagner Nascimento Magalhães

18 May 5	Flamengo	0–2	São Paulo	Rio de Janeiro
16:00 UTC−03:00			Ganso 23', 90+1'	Stadium: Estádio do Maracanã; Attendance: 25.118; Referee: Ricardo Marques Ribeiro

22 May 6	Flamengo	1–1	Bahia	Macaé
19:30 UTC−03:00	Paulinho 11'		Talisca 90+2'	Stadium: Estádio Cláudio Moacyr; Attendance: 10.924; Referee: Gilberto Rodrigues Castro Junior

25 May 7	Santos	0–0	Flamengo	São Paulo
19:30 UTC−03:00				Stadium: Estádio do Morumbi; Attendance: 7.182; Referee: Jaílson Macedo Freitas

30 May 8	Flamengo	1–1	Figueirense	São Paulo
19:30 UTC−03:00	Alecsandro 20'		Everaldo 22'	Stadium: Estádio do Morumbi; Attendance: 4.579; Referee: Thiago Duarte Peixoto

1 June 9	Cruzeiro	3–0	Flamengo	Uberlândia
16:00 UTC−03:00	Ricardo Goulart 16'; Éverton Ribeiro 18'; Borges 45+1'			Stadium: Parque do Sabiá; Attendance: 10.283; Referee: Luiz Flávio de Oliveira

17 July 10	Flamengo	1–2	Atlético Paranaense	Macaé
19:30 UTC−03:00	Samir 33'		Douglas Coutinho 20'; Cleberson 61'	Stadium: Estádio Cláudio Moacyr; Attendance: 6.692; Referee: Paulo Henrique de Godoy Bezerra

20 July 11	Internacional	4–0	Flamengo	Porto Alegre
16:00 UTC−03:00	Rafael Moura 16'; D'Alessandro 45+3' (pen.); Fabrício 58'; Alex 78'			Stadium: Estádio Beira Rio; Attendance: 27.633; Referee: Sandro Meira Ricci

27 July 12	Flamengo	1–0	Botafogo	Rio de Janeiro
18:30 UTC−03:00	Alecsandro 33'			Stadium: Estádio do Maracanã; Attendance: 52.378; Referee: Wilton Sampaio

3 August 13	Chapecoense	1–0	Flamengo	Chapecó
16:00 UTC−03:00	Neném 7'			Stadium: Arena Condá; Attendance: 13.107; Referee: Raphael Claus

10 August 14	Flamengo	1–0	Sport	Rio de Janeiro
18:30 UTC−03:00	Eduardo 85'			Stadium: Estádio do Maracanã; Attendance: 42.071; Referee: Emerson de Almeida Ferreira

17 August 15	Coritiba	0–1	Flamengo	Curitiba
16:00 UTC−03:00			Éverton 17'	Stadium: Estádio Couto Pereira; Attendance: 16.455; Referee: Ricardo Marques Ribeiro

20 August 16	Flamengo	2–1	Atlético Mineiro	Rio de Janeiro
21:50 UTC−03:00	Léo Moura 65' (pen.); Eduardo 71'		Maicosuel 10'	Stadium: Estádio do Maracanã; Attendance: 40.892; Referee: Sandro Meira Ricci

24 August 17	Criciúma	0–2	Flamengo	Criciúma
16:00 UTC−03:00			Mugni 78' (pen.); Eduardo 82'	Stadium: Heriberto Hülse; Attendance: 14.864; Referee: Leandro Pedro Vuaden

31 August 18	Vitória	1–2	Flamengo	Salvador
18:30 UTC−03:00	Caio 40'		Marcelo 33'; Alecsandro 71' (pen.)	Stadium: Barradão; Attendance: 14.477; Referee: Anderson Daronco

6 September 19	Flamengo	0–1	Grêmio	Rio de Janeiro
18:30 UTC−03:00			Luan 90+1'	Stadium: Estádio do Maracanã; Attendance: 59.680; Referee: André Luiz de Freitas Castro

10 September 20	Goiás	1–0	Flamengo	Cuiabá
21:50 UTC−03:00	Samuel 70'			Stadium: Arena Pantanal; Attendance: 33.278; Referee: Ricardo Marques Ribeiro

14 September 21	Flamengo	1–0	Corinthians	Rio de Janeiro
16:00 UTC−03:00	Wallace 65'			Stadium: Estádio do Maracanã; Attendance: 36.905; Referee: Sandro Meira Ricci

17 September 22	Palmeiras	2–2	Flamengo	São Paulo
21:50 UTC−03:00	Diogo 48'; Victor Luis 69'		Canteros 13'; Alecsandro 32'	Stadium: Estádio do Pacaembú; Attendance: 20.587; Referee: Anderson Daronco

21 September 23	Flamengo	1–1	Fluminense	Rio de Janeiro
16:00 UTC−03:00	Eduardo 27'		Fred 45'	Stadium: Estádio do Maracanã; Attendance: 41.666; Referee: Dewson Freitas

24 September 24	São Paulo	2–2	Flamengo	São Paulo
21:50 UTC−03:00	Rogério Ceni 18' (pen.); Luís Fabiano 90'		Éverton 35'; Alecsandro 87'	Stadium: Estádio do Morumbi; Attendance: 16.598; Referee: André Luiz de Freitas Castro

28 September 25	Bahia	2–1	Flamengo	Salvador
16:00 UTC−03:00	E. Biancucchi 18', 49' (pen.)		Eduardo 62'	Stadium: Itaipava Arena Fonte Nova; Attendance: 37.393; Referee: Leandro Pedro Vuaden

4 October 26	Flamengo	0–1	Santos	Rio de Janeiro
16:20 UTC−03:00			Robinho 25'	Stadium: Estádio do Maracanã; Attendance: 43.790; Referee: Marielson Alves da Silva

8 October 27	Figueirense	1–2	Flamengo	Florianópolis
22:00 UTC−03:00	Mazola 57'		Eduardo 5'; Nixon 90+3'	Stadium: Estádio Orlando Scarpelli; Attendance: 16.330; Referee: Flávio Rodrigues Guerra

12 October 28	Flamengo	3–0	Cruzeiro	Rio de Janeiro
16:00 UTC−03:00	Dedé 15' (o.g.); Canteros 57'; Gabriel 62'			Stadium: Estádio do Maracanã; Attendance: 42.171; Referee: Francisco Carlos do Nascimento

19 October 29	Atlético Paranaense	2–1	Flamengo	Curitiba
16:00 UTC−03:00	Cléo 17', 45' (pen.)		Eduardo 8'	Stadium: Arena da Baixada; Attendance: 20.573; Referee: Jean Pierre Gonçalves Lima

22 October 30	Flamengo	2–0	Internacional	Rio de Janeiro
19:30 UTC−03:00	Gabriel 69', 90+1'			Stadium: Estádio do Maracanã; Attendance: 21.855; Referee: Thiago Duarte Peixoto

26 October 31	Botafogo	2–1	Flamengo	Manaus
18:30 UTC−03:00	Rogério 34'; Wallyson 67'		Eduardo 75'	Stadium: Arena da Amazônia; Attendance: 42.391; Referee: Ricardo Marques Ribeiro

2 November 32	Flamengo	3–0	Chapecoense	Rio de Janeiro
19:30 UTC−03:00	Anderson Pico 56'; Nixon 61', 70'			Stadium: Estádio do Maracanã; Attendance: 31.984; Referee: Wilton Sampaio

9 November 33	Sport	2–2	Flamengo	Recife
17:00 UTC−03:00	Danilo 89'; Mike 90+2'		Araújo 9'; Nixon 24'	Stadium: Itaipava Arena Pernambuco; Attendance: 37.615; Referee: Elmo Alves Resende Cunha

16 November 34	Flamengo	3–2	Coritiba	Rio de Janeiro
17:00 UTC−03:00	Mugni 18'; Éverton 58'; Gabriel 81'		Joel 67', 84'	Stadium: Estádio do Maracanã; Attendance: 28.250; Referee: Leandro Pedro Vuaden

19 November 35	Atlético Mineiro	4–0	Flamengo	Belo Horizonte
22:00 UTC−03:00	Luan 25', 63'; Tardelli 45' (pen.); Dodô 72'			Stadium: Estádio Independência; Attendance: 10.123; Referee: Flavio Rodrigues de Souza

23 November 36	Flamengo	1–1	Criciúma	São Luís
17:00 UTC−03:00	Élton 38'		Cléber Santana 65'	Stadium: Estádio Castelão; Attendance: 27.753; Referee: Francisco Carlos do Nascimento

30 November 37	Flamengo	4–0	Vitória	Manaus
21:00 UTC−03:00	Kadu 28' (o.g.); Élton 69'; Éverton 80'; Nixon 86'			Stadium: Arena da Amazônia; Attendance: 17.860; Referee: Elmo Alves Resende Cunha

7 December 38	Grêmio	1–1	Flamengo	Porto Alegre
17:00 UTC−03:00	Luan 58'		Luiz Antônio 32'	Stadium: Arena do Grêmio; Attendance: 13.713; Referee: Luiz Flávio de Oliveira

=== Copa Libertadores ===
==== Standings ====
Pos	Team	Pld	W	D	L	GF	GA	GD	Pts	BOL	LEO	FLA	EME
1	(Bolivia) Bolívar	6	3	2	1	8	6	+2	11		1–1	1–0	2–1
2	(Mexico) León	6	3	1	2	10	7	+3	10	0–1		2–1	3–0
3	(Brazil) Flamengo	6	2	1	3	10	10	0	7	2–2	2–3		3–1
4	(Ecuador) Emelec	6	2	0	4	7	12	−5	6	2–1	2–1	1–2	

Legend: Blue = home team win; Yellow = draw; Red = away team win.

==== Average attendances ====
Includes all home matches in the 2014 Copa Libertadores.

Stadium	Matches	Average	Highest attendance	Lowest attendance
Estádio do Maracanã	3	47.537	60.451	39.188
Total	3	47.537	60.451	39.188

==== Matches ====
12 February 2014 1	León (Mexico)	2–1	(Brazil) Flamengo	León
18:00 UTC−6	Boselli 31' (pen.); Arizala 67'	Report	Víctor Cáceres 42'	Stadium: Estadio León; Referee: Hernando Buitrago (Colombia)

26 February 2014 2	Flamengo (Brazil)	3–1	(Ecuador) Emelec	Rio de Janeiro
22:00 UTC−3	Elano 10'; Hernane 54'; Éverton 81'	Report	Escalada 87'	Stadium: Estádio do Maracanã; Attendance: 39.188; Referee: Néstor Pitana (Argentina)

12 March 2014 3	Flamengo (Brazil)	2–2	(Bolivia) Bolívar	Rio de Janeiro
22:00 UTC−3	Éverton 54', 65'	Report	Capdevila 52'; Pedriel 72'	Stadium: Estádio do Maracanã; Attendance: 42.971; Referee: Enrique Osses (Chile)

19 March 2014 4	Bolívar (Bolivia)	1–0	(Brazil) Flamengo	La Paz
21:00 UTC−4	Arce 4' (pen.)	Report		Stadium: Estadio Hernando Siles; Referee: Mario Díaz de Vivar (Paraguay)

2 April 2014 5	Emelec (Ecuador)	1–2	(Brazil) Flamengo	Guayaquil
20:00 UTC−5	Stracqualursi 65' (pen.)	Report	Alecsandro 8' (pen.); Paulinho 90+2'	Stadium: Estadio George Capwell; Referee: Julio Bascuñán (Chile)

9 April 2014 6	Flamengo (Brazil)	2–3	(Mexico) León	Rio de Janeiro
19:45 UTC−3	André Santos 29'; Alecsandro 34'	Report	Arizala 20'; Boselli 30'; Peña 83'	Stadium: Estádio do Maracanã; Attendance: 60.451; Referee: Diego Abal (Argentina)
