= Marcelo (footballer, born 1991) =

Brazilian footballer (1991–2016)

Personal information
- Full name: Marcelo Augusto Mathias da Silva
- Date of birth: 26 August 1991
- Place of birth: Juiz de Fora, Brazil
- Date of death: 28 November 2016 (aged 25)
- Place of death: La Unión, Colombia
- Height: 1.86 m (6 ft 1 in)
- Position: Centre back

Youth career
- Tupi
- 2011: Macaé

Senior career*
Years	Team	Apps	(Gls)
2012–2014	Volta Redonda	24	(1)
2014–2016	Cianorte	0	(0)
2014–2015	→ Flamengo (loan)	32	(1)
2016	→ Chapecoense (loan)	22	(0)
Total		78	(2)
- * Club domestic league appearances and goals

Marcelo Augusto Mathias da Silva (26 August 1991 – 28 November 2016), simply known as Marcelo, was a Brazilian footballer who last played as a central defender for Chapecoense.

Marcelo was one of the victims when LaMia Airlines Flight 2933 crashed on 28 November 2016.

== Club career ==
=== Volta Redonda ===
Marcelo was born in Juiz de Fora, Minas Gerais, but represented Macaé as a youth. After being released, he joined Volta Redonda in 2012.

Marcelo made his senior debut on 20 April 2012, starting in a 2–0 away win against Resende for the Campeonato Carioca championship. Regularly used during the club's run in Série D, he managed to appear in only one match during the following year's state championship, but returned to feature regularly in the following campaign.

=== Flamengo ===
On 23 April 2014, shortly after having his federative rights acquired by Cianorte, Marcelo was loaned to Série A club Flamengo until the end of 2015. He made his division debut on 27 July, starting in a 1–0 derby home win against Botafogo.

Marcelo scored his first goal in the main category of Brazilian football on 31 August 2014, netting the first in a 2–1 away win against Vitória. Ending the season as a starter, he fell down the pecking order in the following year, after the emergence of Samir and the arrival of César Martins.

=== Chapecoense ===
On 8 January 2016, Marcelo signed for fellow top tier club Chapecoense. He spent four months nursing an injury before returning to action on 27 November, in a 0–1 away loss against Palmeiras, which would be his last match.

== Death ==
On 28 November 2016, whilst at the service of Chapecoense, Marcelo was among the fatalities of the LaMia Airlines Flight 2933 accident in the Colombian village of Cerro Gordo, La Unión, Antioquia.

== Career statistics ==
As of 27 November 2016

Club	Season	League			State League		Cup		Continental		Other		Total	
Club	Season	Division	Apps	Goals	Apps	Goals	Apps	Goals	Apps	Goals	Apps	Goals	Apps	Goals
Volta Redonda	2012	Série D	7	0	2	0	0	0	—		—		9	0
Volta Redonda	2013	Carioca	—		1	0	0	0	—		11 (Note: Appearance(s) in Copa Rio)	0	12	0
Volta Redonda	2014	Carioca	—		14	1	—		—		—		14	1
Volta Redonda	Subtotal		7	0	17	1	0	0	—		11	0	35	1
Flamengo	2014	Série A	17	1	—		3	0	—		—		20	1
Flamengo	2015	Série A	11	0	4	0	2	0	—		—		17	0
Flamengo	Subtotal		28	1	4	0	5	0	—		—		37	1
Chapecoense	2016	Série A	13	0	9	0	1	0	0	0	—		23	0
Career total			48	1	30	1	6	0	0	0	11	0	95	2

== Honours ==
Chapecoense

- Copa Sudamericana: 2016 (posthumously)
