= Luan Polli =

Brazilian footballer

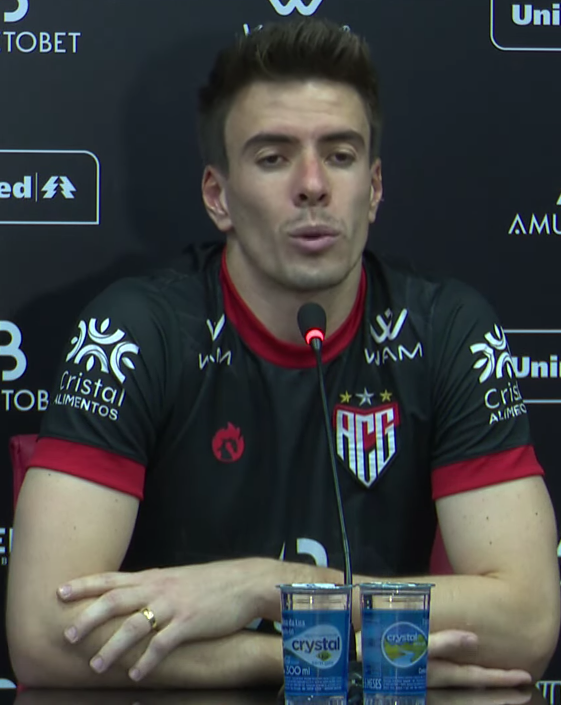
- Polli in 2022

Personal information
- Full name: Luan Polli Gomes
- Date of birth: 6 April 1993 (age 33)
- Place of birth: Meleiro, Brazil
- Height: 1.89 m (6 ft 2 1/2 in)
- Position: Goalkeeper

Team information
- Current team: Athletic (MG)
- Number: 1

Youth career
- 2009–2013: Figueirense
- 2013: → Flamengo (loan)

Senior career*
Years	Team	Apps	(Gls)
2012–2017	Figueirense	7	(0)
2013–2014	→ Flamengo (loan)	1	(0)
2016–2017	→ Boa Esporte (loan)	23	(0)
2018	Naxxar Lions	3	(0)
2018–2021	Sport Recife	59	(0)
2021–2022	Atlético Goianiense	21	(0)
2022–2023	Fortaleza	0	(0)
2023–2024	Coritiba	5	(0)
2024–2025	Nassaji Mazandaran	39	(0)
2025	Cuiabá	14	(0)
2026–	Athletic (MG)	35	(0)
- * Club domestic league appearances and goals as of 18 November 2026

Luan Polli Gomes (born 6 April 1993) is a Brazilian footballer who plays for Athletic (MG) as a goalkeeper.

== Club career ==
Born in Meleiro, Santa Catarina, Luan joined Figueirense's youth setup in 2009, aged 15. On 2 September 2012 he was loaned to Flamengo, until June 2013.

Luan was promoted to the main squad in 2013, and subsequently renewed his loan deal for a further year. He made his senior debut for the club on 16 March 2014, starting in a 2–2 home draw against Bangu.

Luan returned to Figueira in the 2014 summer, and made his first team – and Série A – debut on 10 September, playing the full 90 minutes in a 1–1 home draw against Fluminense.

== Honours ==
Flamengo

- Copa do Brasil: 2013
- Campeonato Carioca: 2014

Atlético Goianiense

- Campeonato Goiano: 2022
