= 2014 Campeonato Brasileiro Série A =

Campeonato Brasileiro Série A
- Official logo.
- Season: 2014
- Champions: Cruzeiro; 4th Campeonato Brasileiro title
- Relegated: Vitória; Bahia; Botafogo; Criciúma
- Copa Libertadores: Cruzeiro; São Paulo; Internacional; Corinthians; Atlético Mineiro
- Matches: 380
- Goals: 860 (2.26 per match)
- Top goalscorer: Fred (18 goals)
- Biggest home win: Botafogo 6−0 Criciúma (10 May); Goiás 6−0 Palmeiras (21 September)
- Biggest away win: Sport 1−4 Corinthians (25 May); Atlético Paranaense 0−3 Fluminense (27 July)
- Highest scoring: Fluminense 5−2 São Paulo (21 May); Corinthians 5−2 Goiás (21 August); Fluminense 5−2 Corinthians (30 November)
- Longest winning run: 5 matches: Internacional (20 June−18 August); Flamengo (10 August−31 August)
- Longest unbeaten run: 12 matches: Cruzeiro (1 June−12 September)
- Longest winless run: 10 matches: Bahia (11 May−03 August); Palmeiras (25 May−21 August); Criciúma (20 July−11 September)
- Longest losing run: 6 matches: Botafogo (2 November-30 November)
- Highest attendance: 58,627; São Paulo 2−0 Cruzeiro (14 September 2014)
- Lowest attendance: 766; Atlético-PR 1−1 Chapecoense (18 May 2014, Willie Davids, Maringá)

The 2014 Campeonato Brasileiro Série A was the 58th edition of the Campeonato Brasileiro Série A, the top-level of professional football in Brazil. Cruzeiro, the defending champions, won the title for the second time in a row and the fourth time overall. The championship had a break between the ninth and tenth rounds due to the 2014 FIFA World Cup, which was held between June and July in Brazil. Cruzeiro took the lead in round 6 and from then on, stayed in that position, winning the title after a 2–1 victory over Goiás in the Mineirão stadium, in round 36.

On the other side of the table, Criciúma, that had been in the relegation zone since round 17, and held the last place since round 30, was relegated after a 1–1 draw against Flamengo, also in round 36. In the following round, Botafogo was relegated after losing to Santos by 2–0. In the last round, Palmeiras, despite only obtaining a draw in its last match, against Atlético Paranaense, guaranteed its survival in the first division after defeats of its competitors, Vitória and Bahia.

== Format ==
Twenty teams competed in the league – for the twelfth consecutive season, the tournament was played in a double round-robin system. The team with the most points at the end of the season is declared champion, while the bottom four teams are relegated and play in the Campeonato Brasileiro Série B in the 2015 season.

=== International qualification ===
The Série A serves as a qualifier to CONMEBOL's 2015 Copa Libertadores. The top-three teams in the standings qualify to the Second Stage of the competition, while the fourth place in the standings qualify to the First Stage.

== Teams and location ==
Location of teams in 2014 Série A

Team	Home city	Stadium	Capacity
Atlético Mineiro	Belo Horizonte	Independência; Ipatingão (2 matches); Parque do Sabiá (one match)	23,018; 16,000; 53,350
Atlético Paranaense	Curitiba	Arena da Baixada; Willie Davids (2 matches); Mané Garrincha (one match); Parque do Sabiá (one match); Orlando Scarpelli (one match)	42,372; 21,600; 72,788; 53,350; 19,584
Bahia	Salvador	Arena Fonte Nova; Joia da Princesa (2 matches); Arena Barueri (one match)	47,907; 16,274; 31,452
Botafogo	Rio de Janeiro	Maracanã; Mané Garrincha (3 matches); Raulino de Oliveira (3 matches); Arena da Amazônia (2 matches); São Januário (one match); Moacyrzão (one match)	78,838; 72,788; 19,183; 44,300; 24,584; 15,000
Chapecoense	Chapecó	Arena Condá	19,325
Corinthians	São Paulo	Arena Corinthians; Canindé (2 matches); Arena Pantanal (one match); Pacaembu (one match)	48,234; 21,004; 44,097; 37,730
Coritiba	Curitiba	Couto Pereira; Vila Capanema (one match)	40,502; 17,140
Criciúma	Criciúma	Heriberto Hülse	19,900
Cruzeiro	Belo Horizonte	Mineirão; Parque do Sabiá (2 matches)	61,846; 53,350
Figueirense	Florianópolis	Orlando Scarpelli; Arena Barueri (one match); Estádio do Café (one match)	19,584; 31,452; 30,300
Flamengo	Rio de Janeiro	Maracanã; Moacyrzão (2 matches); Mané Garrincha (one match); Morumbi (one match); Arena da Amazônia (one match); Castelão (one match)	78,838; 15,000; 72,788; 67,428; 44,300; 40,149
Fluminense	Rio de Janeiro	Maracanã; Mané Garrincha (one match); Raulino de Oliveira (one match); Moacyrzão (one match)	78,838; 72,788; 19,183; 15,000
Goiás	Goiânia	Serra Dourada; Mangueirão (one match); Arena Pantanal (one match); Mário Helênio (one match); JK (one match)	41,574; 45,007; 44,097; 31,863; 14,455
Grêmio	Porto Alegre	Arena do Grêmio; Alfredo Jaconi (2 matches)	55,662; 19,924
Internacional	Porto Alegre	Beira-Rio; Centenário (2 matches)	50,128; 22,132
Palmeiras	São Paulo	Pacaembu; Allianz Parque (2 matches); Prudentão (one match); Fonte Luminosa (one match)	37,730; 43,713; 45,954; 21,441
Santos	Santos	Vila Belmiro; Arena Pantanal (2 matches); Pacaembu (2 matches); Morumbi (one match); Primeiro de Maio (one match)	16,068; 44,097; 37,730; 67,428; 15,759
São Paulo	São Paulo	Morumbi; Pacaembu (one match); Arena Barueri (one match)	67,428; 37,730; 31,452
Sport	Recife	Ilha do Retiro; Arena Pernambuco (7 matches)	32,983; 44,300
Vitória	Salvador	Barradão; Pituaçu (2 matches); Joia da Princesa (2 matches); Arena Fonte Nova (one match)	35,632; 32,157; 16,274; 47,907

=== Number of teams by state ===
Number of teams	State	Team(s)
4	São Paulo	Corinthians, Palmeiras, Santos, São Paulo
3	Rio de Janeiro	Botafogo, Flamengo, Fluminense
3	Santa Catarina	Chapecoense, Criciúma, Figueirense
2	Bahia	Bahia, Vitória
2	Minas Gerais	Atlético Mineiro, Cruzeiro
2	Paraná	Atlético Paranaense, Coritiba
2	Rio Grande do Sul	Grêmio, Internacional
1	Goiás	Goiás
1	Pernambuco	Sport

=== Average attendance ===
Club	Average attendance
Cruzeiro	30,015
Corinthians	29,195
São Paulo FC	28,611
Flamengo	28,221
Internacional	23,532
Grêmio	22,564
Palmeiras	19,947
Fluminense	19,448
Sport	18,749
Atlético Mineiro	14,200
Bahia	13,313
Botafogo	12,457
Coritiba	12,401
Vitória	10,635
Atlético Paranaense	10,463
Chapecoense	10,283
Santos FC	9,407
Criciúma EC	9,321
Figueirense	8,527
Goiás EC	6,958

=== Foreign players ===
The clubs can have a maximum of five foreign players in their Campeonato Brasileiro squads per match

Club	Player 1	Player 2	Player 3	Player 4	Player 5	Player 6	Player 7	Player 8	Dual Nationality Players	Former Players
Atlético Mineiro	(Argentina) Jesús Dátolo									(Argentina) Nicolás Otamendi
Atlético Paranaense	(Uruguay) Lucas Olaza	(Uruguay) Matías Mirabaje								
Bahia	(Argentina) Emanuel Biancucchi									(Paraguay) Wilson Pittoni
Botafogo	(Argentina) Juan Carlos Ferreyra	(Argentina) Mario Bolatti	(Paraguay) Pablo Zeballos	(Peru) Luis Ramírez					(Qatar) Emerson Sheik	(Uruguay) Nicolás Lodeiro
Chapecoense	(Paraguay) Enrique Meza									
Corinthians	(Paraguay) Ángel Romero	(Peru) Paolo Guerrero								
Coritiba	(Angola) Geraldo	(Argentina) Alejandro Martinuccio	(Cameroon) Joel Tagueu							
Criciúma										
Cruzeiro	(Bolivia) Marcelo Moreno	(Paraguay) Miguel Samudio								(Argentina) Alejandro Martinuccio
Figueirense	(Chile) Roberto Cereceda	(Uruguay) Bruno Fornaroli								
Flamengo	(Argentina) Héctor Canteros	(Argentina) Lucas Mugni	(Ecuador) Frickson Erazo	(Paraguay) Víctor Cáceres		(Croatia) Eduardo				
Fluminense	(Argentina) Darío Conca	(Colombia) Edwin Valencia								
Goiás										
Grêmio	(Argentina) Alan Ruiz	(Argentina) Hernán Barcos	(Argentina) Matías Rodríguez	(Paraguay) Cristian Riveros						(Uruguay) Maxi Rodríguez
Internacional	(Argentina) Andrés D'Alessandro	(Argentina) Carlos Luque	(Chile) Charles Aránguiz							(Portugal) Otávio
Palmeiras	(Argentina) Agustín Allione	(Argentina) Fernando Tobio	(Argentina) Jonatan Cristaldo	(Argentina) Pablo Mouche	(Chile) Jorge Valdivia	(Paraguay) William Mendieta	(Uruguay) Mauricio Victorino	(Uruguay) Sebastián Eguren		
Santos	(Chile) Eugenio Mena									
São Paulo	(Uruguay) Álvaro Pereira									(Colombia) Dorlan Pabón
Sport Recife										
Vitória	(Argentina) Damián Escudero	(Paraguay) Luis Cáceres	(Paraguay) Guillermo Beltrán	(Paraguay) Roberto Fernandez						(Uruguay) Luis Aguiar

== Personnel and kits ==
Team	Manager	Captain	Kit manufacturer	Shirt sponsor
Atlético Mineiro	(Brazil) Levir Culpi	(Brazil) Réver	Puma	Banco BMG
Atlético Paranaense	(Brazil) Claudinei Oliveira	(Brazil) Wéverton	Umbro	Caixa
Bahia	(Brazil) Gilson Kleina	(Brazil) Marcelo Lomba	Nike	Grupo OAS
Botafogo	(Brazil) Vágner Mancini	(Brazil) Jefferson	Puma	Guaraviton
Chapecoense	(Brazil) Celso Rodrigues	(Brazil) Bruno Rangel	Umbro	Caixa
Corinthians	(Brazil) Mano Menezes	(Brazil) Ralf	Nike	Caixa
Coritiba	(Brazil) Marquinhos Santos	(Brazil) Alex	Nike	Caixa
Criciúma	(Brazil) Gilmar Dal Pozzo	(Brazil) Paulo Baier	Kanxa	Dotz/Ar Condicionado Springer
Cruzeiro	(Brazil) Marcelo Oliveira	(Brazil) Fábio	Olympikus	Banco BMG
Figueirense	(Brazil) Argel Fucks	(Brazil) Tiago Volpi	Penalty	Caixa
Flamengo	(Brazil) Vanderlei Luxemburgo	(Brazil) Léo Moura	Adidas	Caixa
Fluminense	(Brazil) Cristóvão Borges	(Brazil) Fred	Adidas	Unimed
Goiás	(Brazil) Ricardo Drubscky	(Brazil) Amaral	Puma	None
Grêmio	(Brazil) Luiz Felipe Scolari	(Argentina) Hernán Barcos	Topper	Banrisul
Internacional	(Brazil) Abel Braga	(Argentina) Andrés D'Alessandro	Nike	Banrisul
Palmeiras	(Brazil) Dorival Júnior	(Chile) Jorge Valdivia	Adidas	None
Santos	(Brazil) Enderson Moreira	(Brazil) Edu Dracena	Nike	None
São Paulo	(Brazil) Muricy Ramalho	(Brazil) Rogério Ceni	Penalty	Semp
Sport	(Brazil) Eduardo Baptista	(Brazil) Durval	Adidas	Caixa
Vitória	(Brazil) Ney Franco	(Brazil) Wilson	Puma	Caixa

== League table ==
Pos	Team	Pld	W	D	L	GF	GA	GD	Pts	Qualification or relegation
1	Cruzeiro (C)	38	24	8	6	67	38	+29	80	2015 Copa Libertadores group stage
2	São Paulo	38	20	10	8	59	40	+19	70	2015 Copa Libertadores group stage
3	Internacional	38	21	6	11	53	41	+12	69	2015 Copa Libertadores group stage
4	Corinthians	38	19	12	7	49	31	+18	69	2015 Copa Libertadores first stage
5	Atlético Mineiro	38	17	11	10	51	38	+13	62	2015 Copa Libertadores group stage (Note: Atlético Mineiro has a berth guaranteed to the second stage as the 2014 Copa do Brasil champions.)
6	Fluminense	38	17	10	11	61	42	+19	61	2015 Copa do Brasil round of 16 (Note: Because neither of Brazilian teams won the 2014 Copa Libertadores, an additionally berth to the 2015 Copa do Brasil round of 16 was given to the best non-qualified to 2015 Copa Libertadores, the sixth-placed Fluminense.)
7	Grêmio	38	17	10	11	36	24	+12	61	2015 Copa Sudamericana second stage (Note: Teams that will entry in 2015 Copa Sudamericana if they do not reach 2015 Copa do Brasil round of 16. Also the 2014 Copa Verde champion (Brasília FC) and the 2015 Copa do Nordeste champion (Ceará) have a berth guaranteed.)
8	Atlético Paranaense	38	15	9	14	43	42	+1	54	2015 Copa Sudamericana second stage
9	Santos	38	15	8	15	42	35	+7	53	2015 Copa Sudamericana second stage
10	Flamengo	38	14	10	14	46	47	−1	52	2015 Copa Sudamericana second stage
11	Sport	38	14	10	14	36	46	−10	52	2015 Copa Sudamericana second stage
12	Goiás	38	13	8	17	38	40	−2	47	2015 Copa Sudamericana second stage
13	Figueirense	38	13	8	17	37	47	−10	47	
14	Coritiba	38	12	11	15	42	45	−3	47	
15	Chapecoense	38	11	10	17	39	44	−5	43	
16	Palmeiras	38	11	7	20	34	59	−25	40	
17	Vitória (R)	38	10	8	20	37	54	−17	38	Relegation to 2015 Campeonato Brasileiro Série B
18	Bahia (R)	38	9	10	19	31	43	−12	37	Relegation to 2015 Campeonato Brasileiro Série B
19	Botafogo (R)	38	9	7	22	31	48	−17	34	Relegation to 2015 Campeonato Brasileiro Série B
20	Criciúma (R)	38	7	11	20	28	56	−28	32	Relegation to 2015 Campeonato Brasileiro Série B

Updated to match(es) played on unknown. Source: Soccerway.com
Rules for classification: 1) points; 2) wins; 3) goal difference; 4) goals scored; 5) head-to-head results; 6) least red cards received; 7) least yellow cards received; 8) draw.
(C) Champions; (R) Relegated

== Positions by round ==
Team ╲ Round	1	2	3	4	5	6	7	8	9	10	11	12	13	14	15	16	17	18	19	20	21	22	23	24	25	26	27	28	29	30	31	32	33	34	35	36	37	38
Atlético Mineiro	9	15	17	15	11	7	9	6	8	11	11	11	9	6	6	8	6	8	7	8	8	7	6	4	4	4	6	4	4	4	3	5	4	6	4	5	6	5
Atlético Paranaense	5	4	8	14	13	14	10	12	11	7	4	9	10	7	7	9	9	10	11	13	11	11	12	13	11	12	15	14	10	10	10	9	9	10	9	8	8	8
Bahia	15	9	6	4	10	10	11	14	15	16	16	19	19	18	19	18	18	19	19	20	19	16	18	16	14	14	16	17	17	18	19	19	19	19	18	18	18	18
Botafogo	20	18	19	13	15	17	17	13	14	14	14	14	16	17	12	16	14	13	14	14	15	17	16	15	16	19	20	19	17	19	17	18	18	18	19	19	19	19
Chapecoense	9	15	17	19	20	20	18	18	16	15	15	15	12	13	13	12	15	15	15	16	14	14	15	14	15	16	14	13	15	15	15	15	16	17	15	14	15	15
Corinthians	9	3	1	3	8	9	6	3	3	2	2	2	4	3	3	3	4	4	4	3	4	4	4	6	7	6	5	6	5	3	5	7	5	5	3	3	4	4
Coritiba	9	13	15	18	19	18	19	20	17	18	19	17	17	20	20	17	19	18	18	17	18	15	17	19	20	20	17	20	20	16	18	17	15	16	17	15	14	14
Criciúma	15	19	13	17	17	12	12	10	13	12	12	12	13	12	15	15	17	17	17	19	17	19	19	20	19	18	19	18	19	20	20	20	20	20	20	20	20	20
Cruzeiro	3	4	2	5	2	1	1	1	1	1	1	1	1	1	1	1	1	1	1	1	1	1	1	1	1	1	1	1	1	1	1	1	1	1	1	1	1	1
Figueirense	20	20	20	20	18	19	20	19	20	17	18	20	18	16	18	14	12	14	12	11	13	13	13	12	10	11	12	15	13	13	13	14	13	13	13	12	12	13
Flamengo	9	17	9	16	16	16	16	17	19	20	20	18	20	19	14	13	11	9	10	12	10	10	11	10	12	13	11	10	11	11	11	10	11	8	10	9	9	10
Fluminense	1	1	5	2	5	3	2	2	2	6	3	3	2	4	4	5	5	5	5	6	5	6	7	7	6	7	8	8	8	7	6	4	7	7	7	7	5	6
Goiás	9	8	4	8	4	6	3	5	7	10	10	7	8	10	11	11	13	12	13	9	12	12	10	11	13	10	10	9	9	9	9	11	10	11	12	13	13	12
Grêmio	17	10	12	7	3	2	4	7	6	9	7	10	11	11	8	10	7	6	6	5	6	5	5	5	5	5	4	5	6	6	7	6	3	4	6	6	7	7
Internacional	5	4	3	1	1	5	8	4	5	8	5	4	3	2	2	2	5	2	3	4	3	3	3	2	2	2	3	2	3	5	4	3	6	3	5	4	3	3
Palmeiras	3	10	14	9	6	4	5	9	10	13	13	13	14	14	17	20	16	16	16	15	16	18	20	17	17	15	13	12	14	14	14	13	14	14	14	16	16	16
Santos	7	12	16	11	12	13	13	11	9	5	9	6	6	9	10	7	10	11	9	10	9	9	9	9	8	8	7	7	7	8	8	8	8	9	8	11	10	9
São Paulo	1	2	7	10	7	8	7	8	4	3	6	8	7	5	5	4	2	3	2	2	2	2	2	3	3	3	2	3	2	2	2	2	2	2	2	2	2	2
Sport	7	4	9	6	6	11	14	15	12	4	8	5	5	8	9	6	8	7	8	7	7	8	8	8	9	9	9	11	12	12	12	12	12	12	11	10	11	11
Vitória	17	14	9	12	14	15	15	16	18	19	17	16	15	15	16	19	20	20	20	18	20	20	14	18	18	17	18	16	16	17	16	16	17	15	16	17	17	17

Source: globoesporte.com

== Results ==
Home \ Away	CAM	CAP	BAH	BOT	CHA	COR	CTB	CRI	CRU	FIG	FLA	FLU	GOI	GRE	INT	PAL	SAN	SPA	SPT	VIT
Atlético Mineiro		3–1	1–1	1–0	1–0	0–0	1–2	1–1	2–1	1–1	4–0	2–0	0–1	0–0	1–0	2–1	3–2	1–0	3–2	2–0
Atlético Paranaense	1–0		0–0	2–0	1–1	1–0	2–0	2–0	2–3	3–0	2–1	0–3	1–0	1–0	0–1	1–1	1–1	2–2	0–1	2–0
Bahia	1–1	1–2		1–0	0–1	1–2	0–0	0–0	1–2	3–0	2–1	0–1	1–0	1–0	0–1	0–1	0–2	0–2	1–0	1–1
Botafogo	0–0	0–2	2–3		1–0	1–0	1–0	6–0	1–1	0–1	2–1	2–0	1–0	0–2	2–2	0–1	1–0	2–4	1–1	1–1
Chapecoense	1–1	3–0	2–1	2–0		0–1	0–0	1–1	1–1	0–1	1–0	1–0	0–0	1–2	5–0	2–0	1–1	0–0	3–1	0–1
Corinthians	1–0	1–1	1–1	1–1	1–1		2–2	2–1	1–0	0–1	2–0	1–1	5–2	1–0	2–1	2–0	1–0	3–2	3–0	2–1
Coritiba	0–0	1–0	3–2	2–0	3–0	0–0		1–0	1–2	0–2	0–1	1–0	3–0	1–1	1–1	2–0	0–0	3–1	0–1	2–0
Criciúma	3–1	0–1	0–1	1–1	1–0	0–0	1–0		0–0	1–0	0–2	3–2	1–0	0–3	0–0	1–2	3–0	1–2	2–2	1–3
Cruzeiro	2–3	2–0	2–1	2–1	4–2	0–1	3–2	3–1		5–0	3–0	2–1	2–1	1–0	2–1	1–1	3–0	1–1	2–0	3–1
Figueirense	2–2	1–3	0–2	1–0	1–0	1–0	4–0	1–1	1–1		1–2	1–1	0–1	0–1	1–2	3–1	0–2	1–1	3–0	2–0
Flamengo	2–1	1–2	1–1	1–0	3–0	1–0	3–2	1–1	3–0	1–1		1–1	0–0	0–1	2–0	4–2	0–1	0–2	1–0	4–0
Fluminense	0–0	2–1	1–1	1–0	1–4	5–2	1–1	4–2	3–3	3–0	2–0		2–0	0–0	1–1	3–0	1–0	5–2	4–0	1–2
Goiás	2–3	3–1	3–0	2–0	4–2	0–1	3–0	1–0	0–1	1–0	1–0	0–2		0–0	0–1	6–0	2–2	2–1	0–0	0–0
Grêmio	2–1	1–0	1–0	2–1	1–0	2–1	2–3	2–0	1–2	1–0	1–1	1–0	0–0		4–1	1–1	0–0	0–1	2–0	1–0
Internacional	2–1	2–1	2–0	2–0	2–0	1–2	4–2	3–0	1–3	2–3	4–0	2–1	1–0	2–0		3–1	1–0	0–1	2–1	1–0
Palmeiras	0–2	1–1	1–1	0–2	4–2	1–1	1–0	1–0	1–2	1–0	2–2	0–1	2–0	2–1	0–1		1–3	1–2	0–2	2–0
Santos	1–2	2–0	1–0	2–0	3–0	0–1	2–1	2–0	0–1	3–1	0–0	0–1	2–0	0–0	1–2	2–0		0–1	1–1	3–1
São Paulo	2–1	1–0	2–1	3–0	0–1	1–1	2–2	1–1	2–0	1–1	2–2	1–3	3–0	1–0	1–1	2–0	2–1		2–0	3–1
Sport	2–1	1–1	1–0	1–0	2–1	1–4	1–0	2–0	0–0	1–0	2–2	2–2	0–1	0–0	0–0	2–1	3–1	1–0		1–2
Vitória	2–3	2–2	2–1	2–1	0–0	0–0	1–1	3–1	0–1	0–1	1–2	3–1	2–2	2–1	2–0	0–1	0–1	1–2	0–1	

Updated to match(es) played on 1 December 2014. Source: CBF
Legend: Blue = home team win; Yellow = draw; Red = away team win.

== Season statistics ==
=== Scoring ===
==== Top scorers ====
As of 7 December 2014

Rank	Player	Club	Goals
1	(Brazil) Fred	Fluminense	18
2	(Brazil) Henrique	Palmeiras	16
4	(Brazil) Ricardo Goulart	Cruzeiro	15
4	(Bolivia) Marcelo Moreno	Cruzeiro	15
5	(Argentina) Hernán Barcos	Grêmio	14
6	(Peru) Paolo Guerrero	Corinthians	12
6	(Brazil) Erik Lima	Goiás	12
7	(Brazil) Diego Tardelli	Atlético Mineiro	10
7	(Brazil) Leandro	Chapecoense	10
10	(Brazil) Cléo	Atlético Paranaense	9
10	(Argentina) Darío Conca	Fluminense	9
10	(Brazil) Luís Fabiano	São Paulo	9
10	(Brazil) Alexandre Pato	São Paulo	9

==== Hat-tricks ====
Player	For	Against	Result	Date
(Brazil) Daniel Correa	Botafogo	Criciúma	6–0	10 May 2014
(Brazil) Douglas Coutinho	Atlético Paranaense	Figueirense	3–1	1 June 2014
(Brazil) Luciano	Corinthians	Goiás	5–2	21 August 2014
(Brazil) Erik	Goiás	Atlético Paranaense	3–1	31 August 2014
(Brazil) Patric	Sport	Santos	3–1	10 September 2014
(Brazil) Henrique	Palmeiras	Chapecoense	4-2	2 October 2014

=== Clean sheets ===
- Most clean sheets: 14
  - Grêmio
- Fewest clean sheets: 4
  - Vitória
