= Feijão (footballer) =

Brazilian footballer

Personal information
- Full name: Antonio Filipe Gonzaga de Aquino
- Date of birth: 8 April 1994 (age 32)
- Place of birth: Salvador, Brazil
- Position: Midfielder

Team information
- Current team: Anapolina

Youth career
- Bahia

Senior career*
| Years | Team | Apps | (Gls) |
| 2013–2018 | Bahia | 77 | (3) |
| 2014 | → Flamengo (loan) | 5 | (0) |
| 2015 | → Atlético Goianense (loan) | 19 | (0) |
| 2018 | → CRB (loan) | 14 | (0) |
| 2019 | São Bento | 2 | (0) |
| 2019 | Kazma SC | | |
| 2020– | Anapolina | 5 | (0) |
- * Club domestic league appearances and goals as of 12:49, 7 February 2021 (UTC)

Antonio Filipe Gonzaga de Aquino (born 8 April 1992), commonly known as Feijão is a Brazilian footballer who plays for Anapolina as a midfielder.

== Club career ==
A product of the youth setup of Esporte Clube Bahia, Feijão was promoted to the senior squad in 2013 following the Copa São Paulo de Futebol Júnior. On 19 September 2013, he scored his first goal for the club in a 2–0 victory over Sport Club Internacional.

On 14 January 2014, Feijão joined Clube de Regatas do Flamengo on a year long loan deal. However, after being sparingly used, he returned to his parent club on 16 April.

Feijão was loaned to Atlético Goianense on a one-year deal on 7 July 2015. On 23 November, the loan deal was prematurely terminated by Atlético Goianense.

On 19 January 2018, Feijão joined Clube de Regatas Brasil on a loan deal till the end of the season.

After a spell at Kazma SC in Kuwait, Feijão returned to Brazil in January 2020 and joined Anapolina.
