= Lucas Mugni =

Argentine footballer

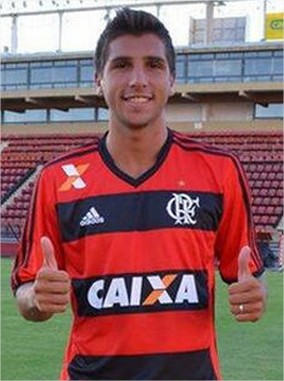
- Mugni with Flamengo in 2014

Personal information
- Full name: Lucas Andrés Mugni
- Date of birth: 12 January 1992 (age 34)
- Place of birth: Santa Fe, Argentina
- Height: 1.82 m (6 ft 0 in)
- Position: Midfielder

Team information
- Current team: Ceará
- Number: 10

Youth career
- 2001–2010: Colón

Senior career*
| Years | Team | Apps | (Gls) |
| 2010–2013 | Colón | 68 | (3) |
| 2014–2016 | Flamengo | 40 | (5) |
| 2015–2016 | → Newell's Old Boys (loan) | 19 | (0) |
| 2017 | Rayo Majadahonda | 0 | (0) |
| 2017–2018 | Everton Viña del Mar | 27 | (2) |
| 2018 | Lanús | 0 | (0) |
| 2019 | Oriente Petrolero | 44 | (9) |
| 2020 | Sport Recife | 30 | (1) |
| 2021 | Gençlerbirliği | 10 | (0) |
| 2021–2023 | Bahia | 61 | (6) |
| 2024–2025 | Ceará | 79 | (7) |
| 2026 | Mirassol | 8 | (1) |
| 2026– | Ceará | 15 | (0) |

International career
| 2008 | Argentina U17 | 2 | (0) |
| 2011–2012 | Argentina U20 | 1 | (1) |
- * Club domestic league appearances and goals as of 18 November 2026

Lucas Andrés Mugni (born 12 January 1992) is an Argentine professional footballer who plays as a midfielder for Campeonato Brasileiro Série B club Ceará.

== Club career ==
=== Colón ===
Mugni began his career at Gimnasia y Esgrima de Ciudadela at the age of 5. He went on to play for Club Atlético Colón at age 9 playing with the youth categories up to the first division.

He made his debut in the First Division on 2 May 2010 for Colón in a goalless draw against Atletico Tucuman at age 18. With the arrival of Roberto Sensini who gave him continuity in the starting lineup, due to his strong performances he took hold of the team and was given the number 10 jersey. On 25 March 2012, he scored his first goal in the first division in Colon's victory against Independiente by 3–0. He scored his first international goal in a Copa Sudamericana match against Racing Club.

=== Flamengo ===
In January 2014, Mugni moved to Flamengo for the amount of U$1.25 million. Mugni debuted for Flamengo on 5 February 2014, against Boavista-RJ, his team won 5–2 in the 2014 Campeonato Carioca. On 23 March 2014, he scored his first goal for Flamengo against Cabofriense. On 24 August 2014, Mugni scored his first Série A goal. He came to the match as a substitute on a 2–0 win against Criciúma in Heriberto Hülse Stadium. He scored on a penalty kick which he also suffered.

In 2015, Mugni was loaned to Newell's Old Boys, returning to Fla in the following year. On 11 January 2017, Mugni and Flamengo agreed in a mutual contract termination, closing his period of little success in the Brazilian club.

=== Gaziantepspor ===
After resigning his contract with Flamengo Mugni signed in January 2017 with Turkish club Gaziantepspor until the end of 2017-18 season. The transfer got cancelled before the contract officially got signed.

=== Rayo Majadahonda ===
On 17 March 2017, Mugni signed for Spanish club Rayo Majadahonda.

=== Later career ===
Mugni subsequently represented Everton de Viña del Mar, Lanús, Oriente Petrolero, Sport Recife, Gençlerbirliği and Bahia.

== International career ==
Mugni has represented Argentina at the U-17 and U-20 level. In September 2012, Alejandro Sabella selected Mugni to the full national team for the first leg match against Brazil in the 2012 Superclásico de las Américas, although he did not feature in the match.

== Career statistics ==
As of 10 March 2023.

Appearances and goals by club, season and competition
| Club | Season | League | | | Cup | | Continental | | State League | | Other | | Total | |
| Club | Season | Division | Apps | Goals | Apps | Goals | Apps | Goals | Apps | Goals | Apps | Goals | Apps | Goals |
|---|---|---|---|---|---|---|---|---|---|---|---|---|---|---|
| Colón | 2010–11 | Argentine Primera División | 5 | 0 | — | | — | | — | | — | | 5 | 0 |
| Colón | 2011–12 | Argentine Primera División | 16 | 1 | — | | 4 (Note: Appearance(s) in Copa Sudamericana.) | 2 | — | | — | | 20 | 3 |
| Colón | 2012–13 | Argentine Primera División | 32 | 2 | — | | — | | — | | — | | 32 | 2 |
| Colón | 2013–14 | Argentine Primera División | 15 | 0 | — | | — | | — | | — | | 15 | 0 |
| Colón | Total | | 68 | 3 | — | | 4 | 2 | — | | — | | 72 | 5 |
| Flamengo | 2014 | Série A | 25 | 2 | 2 | 0 | 3 (Note: Appearance(s) in Copa Libertadores.) | 0 | 9 (Note: Appearance(s) in Campeonato Carioca.) | 3 | — | | 39 | 5 |
| Flamengo | 2015 | Série A | 1 | 0 | 1 | 0 | — | | 5 | 0 | — | | 7 | 0 |
| Flamengo | Total | | 26 | 2 | 3 | 0 | 3 | 0 | 14 | 3 | — | | 46 | 5 |
| Newell's Old Boys (loan) | 2015 | Argentine Primera División | 13 | 0 | — | | — | | — | | — | | 13 | 0 |
| Newell's Old Boys (loan) | 2016 | Argentine Primera División | 6 | 0 | — | | — | | — | | — | | 6 | 0 |
| Newell's Old Boys (loan) | Total | | 19 | 0 | — | | — | | — | | — | | 19 | 0 |
| Everton Viña del Mar | 2017 | Chilean Primera División | 15 | 1 | 2 | 1 | — | | — | | — | | 17 | 2 |
| Everton Viña del Mar | 2018 | Chilean Primera División | 12 | 1 | 0 | 0 | 2 | 0 | — | | — | | 14 | 1 |
| Everton Viña del Mar | Total | | 27 | 2 | 2 | 1 | 2 | 0 | — | | — | | 31 | 3 |
| Lanús | 2018–19 | Argentine Primera División | 0 | 0 | 2 | 0 | — | | — | | — | | 2 | 0 |
| Oriente Petrolero | 2019 | Bolivian Primera División | 44 | 9 | — | | 2 | 1 | — | | — | | 46 | 10 |
| Sport Recife | 2020 | Série A | 23 | 1 | 1 | 0 | — | | 7 (Note: Appearance(s) in Campeonato Pernambucano.) | 0 | 7 (Note: Appearance(s) in Copa do Nordeste.) | 1 | 37 | 2 |
| Gençlerbirliği | 2020–21 | Süper Lig | 10 | 0 | 0 | 0 | — | | — | | — | | 10 | 0 |
| Bahia | 2021 | Série A | 20 | 0 | 1 | 0 | — | | — | | — | | 21 | 0 |
| Bahia | 2022 | Série B | 29 | 6 | 2 | 1 | — | | 5 (Note: Appearance(s) in Campeonato Baiano.) | 0 | 6 | 0 | 42 | 7 |
| Bahia | 2023 | Série A | 0 | 0 | 0 | 0 | — | | 7 | 0 | 6 | 1 | 13 | 1 |
| Bahia | Total | | 49 | 6 | 3 | 1 | — | | 12 | 0 | 12 | 0 | 76 | 8 |
| Career total | | | 266 | 23 | 10 | 2 | 11 | 3 | 33 | 3 | 19 | 1 | 339 | 32 |

== Honours ==
Flamengo

- Campeonato Carioca: 2014

Bahia

- Campeonato Baiano: 2023

Ceará

- Campeonato Cearense: 2024
