= Anderson Pico =

Brazilian footballer (born 1988)

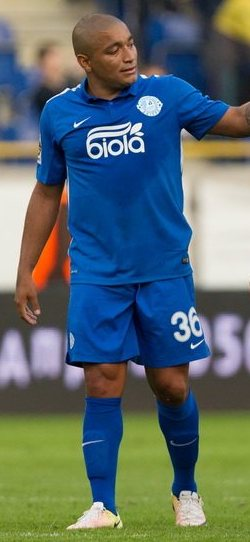

Personal information
- Full name: Anderson da Silveira Ribeiro
- Date of birth: 4 November 1988 (age 38)
- Place of birth: Porto Alegre, Brazil
- Height: 1.70 m (5 ft 7 in)
- Position: Full-back

Team information
- Current team: Metalist Kharkiv
- Number: 36

Youth career
- 2002–2007: Grêmio

Senior career*
Years	Team	Apps	(Gls)
2007–2013	Grêmio	57	(3)
2009	→ Figueirense (loan)	11	(0)
2010	→ Brasiliense (loan)	2	(1)
2011	→ Juventude (loan)	8	(0)
2013	Chapecoense	10	(0)
2014–2016	Flamengo	13	(1)
2015–2016	→ Dnipro Dnipropetrovsk (loan)	12	(2)
2016–2017	Dnipro Dnipropetrovsk	6	(0)
2018	São Paulo	10	(0)
2018–2020	Kisvárda	13	(0)
2020–2021	Metal Kharkiv	2	(1)
2021	São José	1	(0)
2022–	Metalist Kharkiv	1	(0)
- * Club domestic league appearances and goals as of 11 May 2023

Anderson da Silveira Ribeiro (born 4 November 1988), commonly known as Anderson Pico, is a Brazilian professional footballer who plays as a full back for Metalist Kharkiv in the Ukrainian Premier League.

== Career ==
On 28 February 2009, Pico left Grêmio on loan, signing with Figueirense until 31 December.

On 12 July 2010, he was loaned to Brasiliense to help the team's struggle to return to the top tier of Brazilian football.

=== Flamengo ===
Pico signed with Flamengo on 5 September 2014.

=== Dnipro Dnipropetrovsk ===
In August 2015, he went on loan to Ukrainian club Dnipro Dnipropetrovsk until the end of the season.

== Career statistics ==
(Correct as of 29 June 2023)

Appearances and goals by club, season and competition
Club	Season	League			National cup		Continental		State League		Total	
Club	Season	Division	Apps	Goals	Apps	Goals	Apps	Goals	Apps	Goals	Apps	Goals
Grêmio	2007	Série A	18	1	—		—		—		18	1
Grêmio	2008	Série A	18	1	—		—		—		18	1
Grêmio	2012	Série A	21	1	—		5	0	—		26	0
Grêmio	Total		57	3	0	0	5	0	0	0	62	3
Figueirense (loan)	2009	Série B	11	0	—		—		—		11	0
Brasiliense (loan)	2010	Série B	2	1	—		—		—		2	1
Juventude (loan)	2011	Série D	8	0	—		—		16	0	24	0
Chapecoense	2013	Série B	10	0	—		—		—		10	0
Flamengo	2014	Série A	9	1	—		—		—		9	1
Flamengo	2015	Série A	4	0	2	0	—		13	1	19	1
Flamengo	Total		13	1	2	0	0	0	13	1	28	2
FC Dnipro (loan)	2015–16	Ukrainian Premier League	12	2	3	0	3	0	—		18	2
FC Dnipro	2016–17	Ukrainian Premier League	6	0	1	0	—		—		7	0
São Paulo	2018	Série A	10	0	—		—		—		10	0
Kisvárda	2018–19	NB I	12	0	2	0	—		—		14	0
Kisvárda	2019–20	NB I	1	0	—		—		—		1	0
Kisvárda	Total		13	0	2	0	0	0	0	0	13	0
Metal Kharkiv	2020–21	Ukrainian Second League	2	1	—		—		—		2	1
São José	2021	Série C	1	0	—		—		—		1	0
Metalist Kharkiv	2022–23	Ukrainian Premier League	1	0	—		—		—		1	0
Career total			146	8	8	0	8	0	29	1	191	9

== Honours ==
Grêmio

- Rio Grande do Sul State League: 2007
