= Héctor Canteros =

Argentine footballer

Personal information
- Full name: Héctor Miguel Canteros
- Date of birth: 15 March 1989 (age 37)
- Place of birth: Buenos Aires, Argentina
- Height: 1.76 m (5 ft 9 in)
- Position: Midfielder

Youth career
- 1999–2008: Vélez Sarsfield

Senior career*
Years	Team	Apps	(Gls)
2008–2014	Vélez Sarsfield	83	(3)
2012–2013	→ Villarreal (loan)	12	(2)
2014–2018	Flamengo	60	(4)
2016–2017	→ Vélez Sarsfield (loan)	14	(0)
2017–2018	→ Chapecoense (loan)	25	(3)
2018–2019	Chapecoense	22	(0)
2019–2020	Ankaragücü	26	(2)
2021	Patronato	29	(1)
2022	Platense	9	(2)
2022	→ CSA (loan)	8	(1)

International career
2011	Argentina	2	(0)
- * Club domestic league appearances and goals as of 7 October 2022

Héctor Miguel Canteros (born 15 March 1989) is an Argentine football midfielder. He previously played for Vélez Sarsfield, Villarreal, Flamengo, Chapecoense and Ankaragücü.

== Early life ==
Canteros was born and raised in Villa Pirelli, a shanty town of the City of Buenos Aires. He started playing youth football in Vélez Sársfield at the age of 10.

== Career ==
=== Vélez Sarsfield ===
Canteros started his professional career for Vélez Sársfield on 8 February 2009, coming on as a substitute in his team's 0–0 draw with Independiente for the first fixture of the 2009 Clausura. He played only one more game in that tournament, the 8th fixture against Banfield, that his team went on to win.

During the 2011 Clausura, and due to Leandro Somoza's departure from Vélez, Canteros started playing more regularly for the first team. He scored his first professional goal in a 2–3 defeat to Quilmes.

In the beginning of 2014 Canteros' name was linked with Flamengo as a possible substitute for Elias, who was returning to Sporting CP as his loan finished. However, Canteros continued to play for Vélez Sarsfield, as Flamengo wanted a loan and the Argentine club was only willing to a permanent move.

=== Flamengo ===
On 3 July 3, 2014 Flamengo paid a fee of US$2.2 million for Canteros, and the player signed a 3-year contract. His debut for the new club came on 27 July in a 1–0 derby win against Botafogo at the Maracanã, as he came from the bench and played 27 minutes. Few days later, on 3 August, Héctor played his first match as a starter against Chapecoense at Arena Condá, which Flamengo lost 0–1.

==== Chapecoense (loan) ====
On 10 August 2017 Chapecoense sign Canteros on loan from Flamengo until May 31, 2018, to replace Andrei Girotto recently transferred to Nantes.

=== Chapecoense ===
As his contract with Flamengo and the loan to Chapecoense finished, on 31 May 2018 Canteros signed a six-month contract with Chapecoense until the end of the 2018 season.

=== Ankaragücü ===
On 31 January 2019, Canteros joined Süper Lig side Ankaragücü on a one-and-a-half-year deal.

== Career statistics ==
(Correct As of 28 August 2021.)

Club	Season	League			Cup		Continental		Other		Total	
Club	Season	Division	Apps	Goals	Apps	Goals	Apps	Goals	Apps	Goals	Apps	Goals
Vélez Sarsfield
Vélez Sarsfield	2008–09	Primera División	2	0	–		–		–		2	0
Vélez Sarsfield	2009–11	Primera División	4	0	–		–		–		4	0
Vélez Sarsfield	2010–11	Primera División	19	1	–		7 (Note: Appearance(s) in Copa Libertadores)	0	–		26	1
Vélez Sarsfield	2011–12	Primera División	28	1	1	1	13 (Note: Five appearances in Copa Libertadores, eight appearances and one goal in Copa Sudamericana)	1	–		42	3
Vélez Sarsfield	2013–14	Primera División	17	0	–		6 (Note: Appearance(s) in Copa Sudamericana)	0	1 (Note: Appearance(s) in Supercopa Argentina)	0	24	0
Vélez Sarsfield	2014	Primera División	13	1	–		6	2	–		19	3
Vélez Sarsfield	Total		83	3	1	1	32	3	1	0	117	7
Villarreal (loan)	2012–13	Segunda División	12	2	–		–		–		12	2
Flamengo
Flamengo	2014	Série A	24	2	6	0	–		–		30	2
Flamengo	2015	Série A	34	2	6	0	–		13 (Note: Appearance(s) in Campeonato Carioca)	1	53	3
Flamengo	2016	Série A	2	0	0	0	–		3 (Note: Two appearances in Campeonato Carioca, one appearance in Primeira Liga)	0	5	0
Flamengo	Total		60	4	12	0	0	0	16	1	88	5
Vélez Sarsfield (loan)	2016–17	Primera División	14	0	–		–		–		14	0
Chapecoense (loan)
Chapecoense (loan)	2017	Série A	13	1	–		1	0	–		14	1
Chapecoense (loan)	2018	Série A	12	2	2	0	0	0	7 (Note: Appearance(s) in Campeonato Catarinense)	0	21	2
Chapecoense		Série A										
Chapecoense	2018	Série A	22	0	2	0	–		–		24	0
Chapecoense	Total		47	3	4	0	1	0	7	0	59	3
Ankaragücü	2018–19	Süper Lig	12	1	0	0	–		–		12	1
Ankaragücü	2019–20	Süper Lig	14	1	1	0	–		–		15	1
Ankaragücü	Total		26	2	1	0	0	0	0	0	27	2
Patronato	2019–20	Primera División	11	0	2	0	–		–		13	0
Patronato	2021	Primera División	7	0	–		–		–		7	0
Patronato	Total		18	0	2	0	0	0	0	0	20	0
Career total			260	14	20	1	33	3	24	1	312	20

=== International appearances and goals ===
#	Date	Venue	Opponent	Final score	Goal	Result	Competition
1.	September 14, 2011	Córdoba, Argentina	Brazil	0–0	0	Draw	2011 Superclásico de las Américas.
2.	September 28, 2011	Belém, Brazil	Brazil	2–0	0	Lost	2011 Superclásico de las Américas.

== Honours ==
Vélez Sársfield

- Argentine Primera División (2): 2009 Clausura, 2011 Clausura
- Supercopa Argentina (1): 2013
