= Léo Morais =

Brazilian footballer (born 1991)

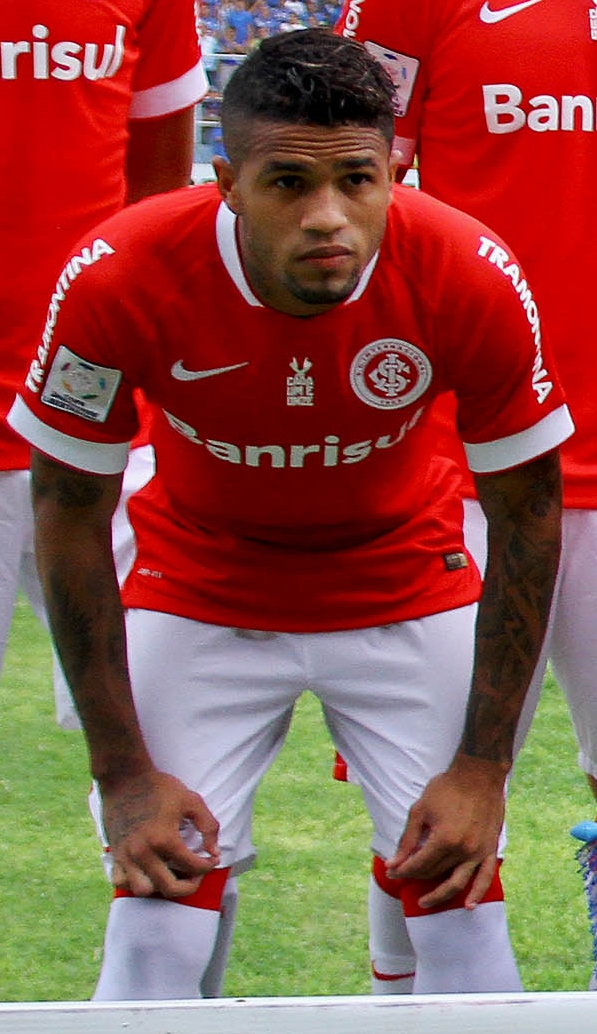
- Léo in a 2015 Copa Libertadores match with Internacional.

Personal information
- Full name: Leonardo Moreira Morais
- Date of birth: 3 October 1991 (age 35)
- Place of birth: Salvador, Brazil
- Height: 1.71 m (5 ft 7 1/2 in)
- Position: Right back

Team information
- Current team: Londrina

Youth career
- 2008–2011: Vitória

Senior career*
Years	Team	Apps	(Gls)
2010–2013	Vitória	21	(1)
2013	→ Atlético Paranaense (loan)	30	(2)
2014–2018	Flamengo	9	(2)
2015	→ Internacional (loan)	13	(0)
2016–2017	→ Atlético Paranaense (loan)	46	(1)
2017	→ Coritiba (loan)	23	(0)
2018	→ Fluminense (loan)	18	(0)
2019	Avaí	18	(0)
2020–2021	Vitória	14	(0)
2022	Botafogo-PA	0	(0)
2023–	Londrina	17	(0)
- * Club domestic league appearances and goals as of 24 July 2023

Leonardo Moreira Morais (born 3 October 1991 in Salvador), commonly known as Léo is a Brazilian professional footballer who plays as a right back for Londrina.

== Career ==
=== Vitória ===
Léo Morais spent a significant portion of his career at Esporte Clube Vitória, where he was developed in the youth system from 2008 to 2011 before making his senior debut. His time with the senior squad was split into two main periods in 2010–2013 and 2020–2021.

During his first senior spell from 2010 to 2013, Léo Morais served the club in both the top flight Série A and the Série B, as well as the regional Campeonato Baiano and the Copa do Brasil. In the league competitions Série A and Série B, he made approximately 21 appearances and scored 1 goal. He was a more frequent feature in the Campeonato Baiano, where he made around 19 appearances and found the net twice. A key achievement during this initial phase was winning the Campeonato Baiano title in 2012.

He later returned to Vitória for a second spell for the 2020–2021 seasons, primarily competing in the Série B,

=== Atlético Paranaense ===
On 8 February 2013 Atlético Paranaense signed Léo Morais on loan from Vitória until the end of the 2013 season. He quickly became a first team starter and was one of the most important players in the 2013 Copa do Brasil campaign, in which Atlético reached the finals only losing to Flamengo in two matches.

=== Flamengo ===
After a great 2013 season with Atlético Paranaense Flamengo signed Léo Morais on 2 2 January 2014, from Vitória, to play as back-up right back for Léo Moura. Léo struggled with a series of injuries and never stablished himself as a regular player on Flamengo's roster.

==== Internacional (loan) ====
Léo Morais moved to Internacional on loan from Flamengo for the 2015 season. This was a title-winning loan period for him in Porto Alegre. He was an active part of the squad that competed in the Campeonato Brasileiro Série A, where he made 8 appearances. Furthermore, he contributed to the club's success in the Copa Libertadores, making 4 appearances in the continental tournament. Most importantly, he played 5 times in the Campeonato Gaúcho which Internacional went on to win in 2015. In his total of approximately 17 appearances for Internacional, he did not score a goal.

==== Second loan to Atlético Paranaense ====
On 17 January 2017 Atlético Paranaense extended Léo Morais until the end of 2017 season. Although, the player was released from the club in May 2017 due to problems with the club officers.

==== Coritiba (loan) ====
After having his loan contract cancelled with Atlético Paranaense, rivals Coritiba signed Léo Morais on loan from Flamengo on 9 May 2017 until the end of 2017 season.

==== Fluminense (loan) ====
As Léo Morais would not have space in Flamengo's first team on 23 January 2018 Fluminense signed him on loan until 31 December 2018.

== Career statistics ==
(Correct As of 24 November 2019)

Club	Season	League			State League		Cup		Continental		Other		Total	
Club	Season	Division	Apps	Goals	Apps	Goals	Apps	Goals	Apps	Goals	Apps	Goals	Apps	Goals
Vitória	2010	Série A	2	0	0	0	0	0	—		—		2	0
Vitória	2011	Série B	7	0	0	0	2	0	—		—		9	0
Vitória	2012	Série B	12	1	17	2	6	0	—		—		35	3
Vitória	2013	Série A	0	0	2	0	0	0	—		—		2	0
Vitória	Total		21	1	19	2	8	0	—		—		48	3
Atlético Paranaense (loan)	2013	Série A	30	2	11	0	—		—		—		41	2
Flamengo	2014	Série A	3	0	6	2	1	0	1 (Note: Appearance(s) in Copa Libertadores)	0	—		11	2
Internacional (loan)	2015	Série A	8	0	5	0	0	0	4	0	—		17	0
Atlético Paranaense (loan)	2016	Série A	30	1	8	0	5	0	—		1 (Note: Appearance(s) in Primeira Liga)	0	44	1
Atlético Paranaense (loan)	2017	Série A	0	0	8	0	0	0	1	0	—		9	0
Atlético Paranaense (loan)	Total		30	1	16	0	5	0	1	0	1	0	53	1
Coritiba (loan)	2017	Série A	23	0	—		—		—		—		23	0
Fluminense (loan)	2018	Série A	15	0	3	0	0	0	5 (Note: Appearance(s) in Copa Sudamericana)	0	—		23	0
Avaí	2019	Série A	15	0	0	0	0	0	—		—		15	0
Career total			145	4	60	4	14	0	11	0	1	0	231	8

== Honours ==
Vitória

- Campeonato Baiano: 2010

Flamengo

- Campeonato Carioca: 2014

Internacional

- Campeonato Gaúcho: 2015

Atlético Paranaense

- Campeonato Paranaense: 2016, 2017
