= Nenén =

Brazilian footballer (born 1982)

Neném
Personal information
- Full name: Odair Souza
- Date of birth: 4 February 1982 (age 44)
- Place of birth: Urubici, Brazil
- Height: 1.73 m (5 ft 8 in)
- Position: Midfielder

Youth career
- 1994–1998: Guarani Palhoça

Senior career*
Years	Team	Apps	(Gls)
1998–1999	Guarani Palhoça		
2000–2002	Atlético Paranaense		
2001	→ Figueirense (loan)		
2003	Goiás		
2003	Guarani Palhoça		
2004	Londrina		
2005	Guarani Palhoça		
2005–2008	Criciúma	30	(0)
2006	→ Caxias (loan)		
2008	→ Veranópolis (loan)	13	(0)
2009–2018	Chapecoense	221	(15)
2010	→ Joinville (loan)	9	(1)
2020	Concórdia	4	(0)
- * Club domestic league appearances and goals as of 12:40, 23 September 2020 (UTC)

Odair Souza (born 4 February 1982), commonly known as Neném, is a Brazilian retired footballer who played as a midfielder.

== Club career ==
Born in Urubici, Santa Catarina, Neném made his senior debuts with lowly locals Guarani Palhoça. After spells at Atlético Paranaense, Figueirense, Goiás, Londrina, Criciúma, Caxias and Veranópolis, all unsuccessful, he joined Chapecoense in 2009.

On 15 July 2010 Neném moved to Joinville in Série D, on loan until the end of the year. He returned to Chape in 2011, and after achieving promotion to Série B in 2012, made his professional debut on 31 August 2013, coming on as a second-half substitute in a 1–2 home loss against Icasa.

Neném appeared in 14 matches during the campaign, with his side being promoted to Série A for the first time ever. He made his top level debut on 11 May 2014, again from the bench in a 1–2 home loss against Grêmio.

Neném also established a record, being the first player to play in all Brazilian four divisions for the same club. He also renewed his link with the club in December 2014, being also the second player with most appearances for Chape in its history.

Neném did not board LaMia Airlines Flight 2933 for the 2016 Copa Sudamericana Finals, which crashed and killed 19 of his teammates.

== Career statistics ==
As of 16 November 2016

Club	Season	League			State League		Cup		Continental		Other		Total	
Club	Season	Division	Apps	Goals	Apps	Goals	Apps	Goals	Apps	Goals	Apps	Goals	Apps	Goals
Criciúma	2005	Série B	7	0	—		—		—		—		7	0
Criciúma	2006	Série B	0	0	4	0	—		—		—		4	0
Criciúma	2007	Série B	9	0	10	0	—		—		—		19	0
Criciúma	Subtotal		16	0	14	0	0	0	0	0	0	0	30	0
Chapecoense	2009	Série D	13	0	26	3	2	0	—		—		41	3
Chapecoense	2010	Série C	0	0	18	3	2	0	—		10 (Note: Appearance(s) in Copa Santa Catarina)	0	30	3
Chapecoense	2011	Série C	14	4	22	2	—		—		—		36	6
Chapecoense	2012	Série C	20	1	19	1	4	0	—		—		43	2
Chapecoense	2013	Série B	14	0	20	1	—		—		—		34	1
Chapecoense	2014	Série A	15	0	13	0	2	0	—		—		30	0
Chapecoense	2015	Série A	11	0	12	0	1	0	3 (Note: Appearance(s) in Copa Sudamericana)	0	—		27	0
Chapecoense	2016	Série A	1	0	4	0	3	0	1	0	—		9	0
Chapecoense	Subtotal		88	5	133	10	14	0	4	0	10	0	249	15
Joinville (loan)	2010	Série D	9	1	—		—		—		—		9	1
Career total			113	6	147	10	14	0	4	0	10	0	288	16

== Honours ==
Chapecoense

- Campeonato Catarinense: 2016, 2017
- Copa Sudamericana: 2016
