= Leozão =

Brazilian footballer

Personal information
- Full name: Leandro dos Santos Candido
- Date of birth: 6 June 1991 (age 35)
- Place of birth: Rio de Janeiro, Brazil
- Height: 1.87 m (6 ft 1 1/2 in)
- Position: Defender

Team information
- Current team: UD Oliveirense
- Number: 3

Youth career
- 2008: Vasco da Gama
- 2008–2012: Internacional

Senior career*
| Years | Team | Apps | (Gls) |
| 2013–2016 | Madureira | 54 | (1) |
| 2014–2015 | → Sintrense (loan) | 14 | (0) |
| 2016– | UD Oliveirense | 15 | (0) |
- * Club domestic league appearances and goals as of 2 April 2017

Leandro dos Santos Candido, known as Leozão (born 6 June 1991) is a Brazilian football player who plays for UD Oliveirense.

== Club career ==
He made his professional debut in the Campeonato Carioca for Madureira on 23 January 2013 in a game against Flamengo.
