= Meleiro =

Coordinates: 28°50′S 49°38′W

- Municipality
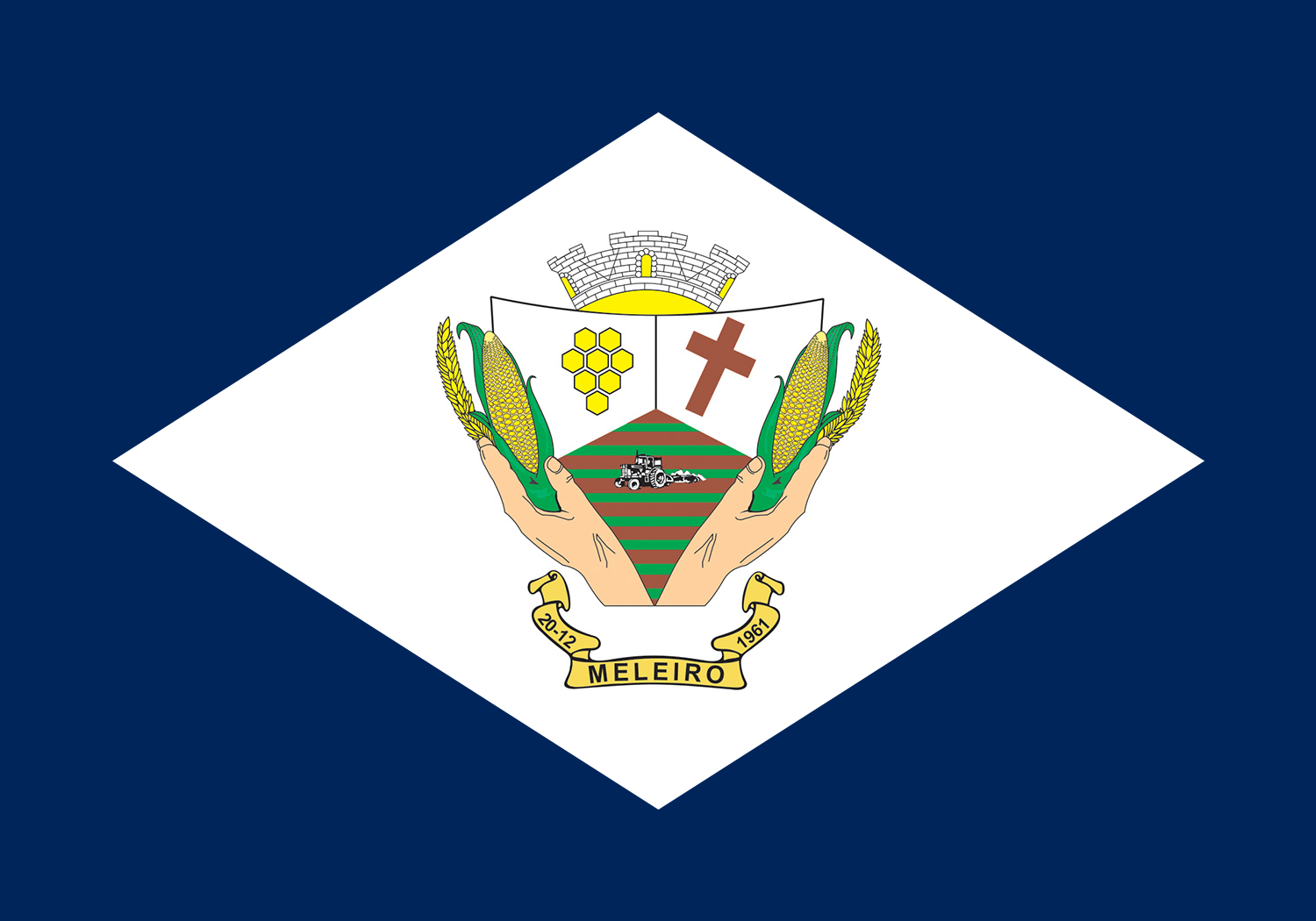
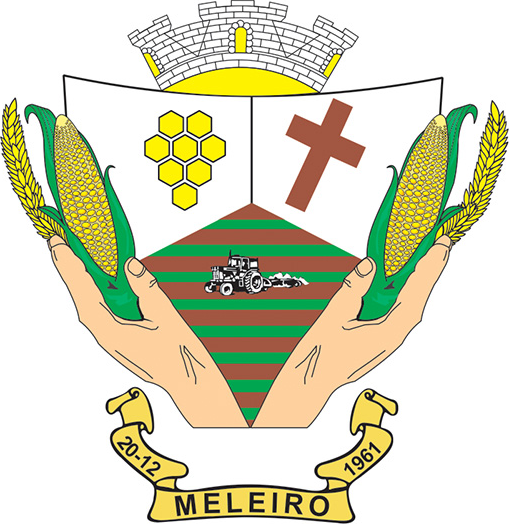
- Flag Coat of arms
- Interactive map of Meleiro
- Country: Brazil
- Region: South
- State: Santa Catarina
- Mesoregion: Sul Catarinense

Population (2020)
  - Total: 7,001
- Time zone: UTC -3
- Website: www.meleiro.sc.gov.br

Meleiro is a municipality in the state of Santa Catarina in the South region of Brazil.

== See also ==
- List of municipalities in Santa Catarina
