= Recife (footballer) =

Brazilian footballer

Personal information
- Full name: Wheidson Roberto dos Santos
- Date of birth: 14 October 1994 (age 32)
- Place of birth: Recife, Brazil
- Height: 1.82 m (6 ft 0 in)
- Position: Defensive midfielder

Team information
- Current team: Sergipe

Youth career
- 2007: Volta Redonda
- 2008–2011: Madureira
- 2011–2014: Flamengo

Senior career*
Years	Team	Apps	(Gls)
2013–2017	Flamengo	6	(0)
2015	→ Atlético Goianiense (loan)	2	(0)
2016	→ Tupi (loan)	23	(1)
2017	Boa Esporte	0	(0)
2018	Rio Branco	0	(0)
2018	Madureira	5	(1)
2019	Iporá	0	(0)
2019	Umuarama	0	(0)
2020–	Sergipe	0	(0)
- * Club domestic league appearances and goals as of 14:02, 19 April 2019 (UTC)

Wheidson Roberto dos Santos (born 14 October 1994) - known as Recife - is a Brazilian footballer who plays as a defensive midfielder for Sergipe.

== Career ==
Recife began his football career with Flamengo, appearing for the club in the 2014 Copa Libertadores. Recife made his Série A debut at 17 July 2014 against Clube Atlético Paranaense in a 1–0 home win. However, he struggled to integrate into Flamengo's first team and was sent out of successive loans to Atlético-GO and Tupi.
