= 2012 CR Flamengo season =

Flamengo
2012 season
- Chairwoman: Patrícia Amorim
- Manager: Vanderlei Luxemburgo (until 3 February); Joel Santana (from 4 February to 23 July); Dorival Júnior (from 26 July)
- Série A: 11th
- Campeonato Carioca: 3rd
- Copa Libertadores: Group Stage
- Top goalscorer: League: Vágner Love (13 goals); All: Vágner Love (21 goals)
- Highest home attendance: 39,060 (vs. Atlético Mineiro in the Série A)
- Lowest home attendance: 3,131 (vs. Olaria in the Rio de Janeiro State League)
Home colours	Away colours	Third colours

The 2012 season is the 117th year in the club's history, the 101st season in Clube de Regatas do Flamengo's football existence, and their 42nd in the Brazilian Série A, having never been relegated from the top division.

== Club ==
=== First-team staff ===
Updated 25 July 2012.

Position	Name
Coach	Dorival Júnior
Assistant coach	Jaime de Almeida
Goalkeeping coach	Cantarele
Fitness coaches	Marcelo Martorelli
Fitness coaches	Daniel Guimarães
Medical staff manager	José Luiz Runco
Doctors	Marcelo Soares
Doctors	Luiz Claudio Baldi
Doctors	Marcio Tannure
Doctors	Serafim Borges
Physiotherapists	Fabiano Bastos
Physiotherapists	Mario Peixoto
Physiologist	Claudio Pavanelli
Dietitian	Leonardo Acro
Dietitian	Sílvia Ferreira
Psychologist	Paulo Ribeiro
Masseurs	Adenir Silva
Masseurs	Esmar Russo
Masseurs	Jorginho

=== Other information ===
Chairman	Patrícia Amorim
Ground (capacity and dimensions)	Engenhão (46,931 / 105x68 meters)

Source: CBF

=== First-team squad ===
As of 9 December 2012, according to combined sources on the official website.

Note: Flags indicate national team as defined under FIFA eligibility rules; some limited exceptions apply. Players may hold more than one non-FIFA nationality.

No.	Pos.	Nation	Player
1	GK	BRA	Felipe
2	DF	BRA	Leonardo Moura (captain)
3	DF	BRA	Welinton
4	DF	CHI	Marcos González
5	MF	BRA	Airton (on loan from S.L. Benfica)
6	DF	BRA	Ramon (on loan from Corinthians)
7	MF	BRA	Ibson
8	MF	BRA	Luiz Antônio
9	MF	BRA	Wellington Bruno (on loan from Ipatinga)
11	MF	BRA	Renato (vice-captain)
13	MF	CHI	Claudio Maldonado
14	MF	PAR	Víctor Cáceres
15	MF	BRA	Luiz Philipe Muralha
16	FW	BRA	Lucas Quintino
18	MF	ARG	Darío Bottinelli
19	FW	BRA	Guilherme Negueba
20	FW	BRA	Thomas
21	DF	BRA	Magal
22	FW	BRA	Hernane (on loan from Mogi Mirim)
23	MF	BRA	Guilherme Camacho
25	DF	BRA	Wellington Silva
26	DF	BRA	Marllon
27	GK	BRA	Paulo Victor

No.	Pos.	Nation	Player
28	GK	BRA	César
29	DF	BRA	Rodrigo Frauches
30	FW	BRA	Nixon
31	FW	POR	Liédson
32	DF	BRA	Digão
33	MF	BRA	Rômulo
34	DF	BRA	João Felipe
35	GK	BRA	Marcelo Carné
36	MF	BRA	Lorran
37	MF	BRA	Adryan
38	DF	BRA	Arthur Sanches
39	FW	BRA	Paulo Sérgio
40	MF	BRA	Amaral (on loan from Nova Iguaçu)
43	MF	BRA	Mattheus
45	DF	BRA	Felipe Dias
61	FW	BRA	Fabiano Oliveira
83	DF	BRA	Renato Santos
88	MF	BRA	Cléber Santana
99	FW	BRA	Vágner Love (vice-captain)
TBA	MF	BRA	Antônio
TBA	FW	BRA	Romário
TBA	FW	BRA	Rafinha

Players with Dual Nationality

- (Argentina) (Italy) Darío Bottinelli
- (Brazil) (Italy) Thomas
- (Chile) (Brazil) Marcos González
- (Portugal) (Brazil) Liédson

=== Flamengo Youth Team ===
==== Professional players able to play in the youth team ====
Note: Flags indicate national team as defined under FIFA eligibility rules; some limited exceptions apply. Players may hold more than one non-FIFA nationality.

No.	Pos.	Nation	Player
15	MF	BRA	Luiz Philipe Muralha
19	FW	BRA	Guilherme Negueba
20	FW	BRA	Thomas
28	GK	BRA	César
29	DF	BRA	Rodrigo Frauches
30	FW	BRA	Nixon
32	DF	BRA	Digão

No.	Pos.	Nation	Player
34	DF	BRA	João Felipe
36	MF	BRA	Lorran
37	MF	BRA	Adryan
43	MF	BRA	Mattheus
TBA	FW	BRA	Rafinha
TBA	FW	BRA	Romário

==== Youth players with first team experience ====
Note: Flags indicate national team as defined under FIFA eligibility rules; some limited exceptions apply. Players may hold more than one non-FIFA nationality.

No. / Pos. / Nation / Player; — / MF / BRA / Caio Quiroga	No. / Pos. / Nation / Player; — / FW / BRA / Yguinho

=== Out on loan ===
Note: Flags indicate national team as defined under FIFA eligibility rules; some limited exceptions apply. Players may hold more than one non-FIFA nationality.

No.	Pos.	Nation	Player
—	DF	BRA	Lucas Galdino (loan to Macaé)
—	DF	BRA	Everton Silva (loan to Atlético Goianiense)
—	DF	BRA	Egídio (loan to Goiás)
—	DF	BRA	Alex Silva (loan to Cruzeiro)
—	DF	BRA	Gustavo (loan to Atlético Goianiense)

No.	Pos.	Nation	Player
—	DF	BRA	Júnior César (loan to Atlético Mineiro)
—	MF	BRA	Erick Flores (loan to Avaí)
—	MF	BRA	João Vitor (loan to Londrina)
—	DF	BRA	Thiago Medeiros (loan to Avaí)

== Transfers ==
=== In ===
Note: Flags indicate national team as defined under FIFA eligibility rules; some limited exceptions apply. Players may hold more than one non-FIFA nationality.

No.	Pos.	Nation	Player
—	DF	BRA	Magal (transfer from Americana)
—	DF	BRA	Everton Silva (loan return from Duque de Caxias)
—	DF	BRA	Egídio (loan return from Ceará)
—	MF	BRA	Kléberson (loan return from Atlético Paranaense)
—	MF	BRA	Erick Flores (loan return from Duque de Caxias)
—	MF	BRA	Guilherme Camacho (loan return from Bahia)
—	GK	BRA	Marcelo Carné (loan return from Duque de Caxias)
—	DF	BRA	Marllon (loan return from Duque de Caxias)
—	FW	BRA	Fabiano Oliveira (loan return from Boluspor)
—	FW	BRA	Itamar (signed as a free agent)
—	DF	CHI	Marcos González (transfer from Universidad de Chile)
—	FW	BRA	Vágner Love (transfer from CSKA Moscow)

No.	Pos.	Nation	Player
—	DF	BRA	Wellington Silva (transfer from Resende)
—	MF	BRA	Amaral (loan from Nova Iguaçu until December 2012)
—	MF	BRA	Jorge Luiz (loan from Friburguense until December 2012)
—	MF	BRA	Ibson (transfer from Santos)
—	DF	BRA	Thiago Medeiros (loan from Madureira until December 2012)
—	MF	PAR	Víctor Cáceres (signed as a free agent)
—	DF	BRA	Ramon (loan from Corinthians until December 2013)
—	FW	POR	Liédson (signed as a free agent)
—	MF	BRA	Cléber Santana (transfer from São Paulo)
—	MF	BRA	Wellington Bruno (loan from Ipatinga until December 2012)
—	DF	BRA	Renato Santos (transfer from Avaí)

=== Out ===
Note: Flags indicate national team as defined under FIFA eligibility rules; some limited exceptions apply. Players may hold more than one non-FIFA nationality.

No.	Pos.	Nation	Player
—	DF	BRA	Ronaldo Angelim (Retired)
—	MF	BRA	Fernando (End of contract)
—	DF	BRA	Everton Silva (loan to Atlético Goianiense until December 2012)
—	MF	BRA	Erick Flores (loan to Itumbiara until December 2012)
—	MF	BRA	Vander (loan return to Bahia)
—	FW	BRA	Paulo Sérgio (loan return from Náutico)
—	DF	BRA	Marlon (transfer to Náutico)
—	MF	CHI	Gonzalo Fierro (transfer to Colo-Colo)
—	MF	BRA	Thiago Neves (loan return to Al-Hilal)
—	DF	BRA	Egídio (loan to Goiás until December 2012)
—	FW	BRA	Jael (transfer to Sport Club Recife)
—	MF	BRA	João Vitor (loan to Londrina until July 2012)
—	DF	BRA	Alex Silva (loan to Cruzeiro until December 2012)
—	FW	BRA	Itamar (Released)

No.	Pos.	Nation	Player
—	DF	BRA	Gustavo (loan to Atlético Goianiense until December 2012)
—	MF	BRA	Willians (transfer to Udinese)
—	DF	BRA	David Braz (transfer to Santos)
—	DF	BRA	Rafael Galhardo (transfer to Santos)
—	DF	BRA	Júnior César (loan to Atlético Mineiro until December 2012)
—	MF	BRA	Ronaldinho (contract terminated)
—	GK	BRA	Marcelo Lomba (transfer to Bahia)
—	DF	BRA	Rodrigo Alvim (Released)
—	FW	BRA	Diego Maurício (transfer to Alania Vladikavkaz)
—	MF	BRA	Vítor Saba (transfer to Brescia)
—	FW	BRA	Deivid (Released)
—	DF	BRA	Thiago Medeiros (loan to Avaí until December 2012)
—	MF	BRA	Jorge Luiz (loan return to Friburguense)
—	FW	BRA	Adriano (Released)

== Statistics ==
=== Appearances and goals ===
Last updated on 9 December 2012.

- Players in italic have left the club during the season.

No.	Pos	Nat	Player	Total		Rio State League		Copa Libertadores		Série A	
No.	Pos	Nat	Player	Apps	Goals	Apps	Goals	Apps	Goals	Apps	Goals
1	GK	(Brazil) BRA	Felipe	38	0	12	0	6	0	20	0
2	DF	(Brazil) BRA	Leonardo Moura	39	3	9	1	7	2	23	0
3	DF	(Brazil) BRA	Welinton	34	1	10	0	6+1	1	16+1	0
4	DF	(Brazil) BRA	David Braz	15	1	9	1	6	0	0	0
4	DF	(Chile) CHI	Marcos González	35	2	5	0	5	0	25	2
5	MF	(Brazil) BRA	Airton	18	1	3	0	2	0	13	1
6	DF	(Brazil) BRA	Júnior César	19	0	11	0	8	0	0	0
6	DF	(Brazil) BRA	Ramon	25	1	0	0	0	0	25	1
7	MF	(Brazil) BRA	Ibson	32	1	0	0	0	0	28+4	1
8	MF	(Brazil) BRA	Willians	14	0	8	0	6	0	0	0
8	MF	(Brazil) BRA	Luiz Antônio	45	4	11+1	0	6+2	3	23+2	1
9	FW	(Brazil) BRA	Deivid	24	6	10+1	4	5+2	2	2+4	0
9	MF	(Brazil) BRA	Wellington Bruno	11	0	0	0	0	0	2+9	0
10	MF	(Brazil) BRA	Ronaldinho	19	6	9	3	8	2	2	1
11	MF	(Brazil) BRA	Renato	35	7	5+2	1	3	0	22+3	6
13	DF	(Brazil) BRA	Gustavo	4	0	3	0	0+1	0	0	0
13	MF	(Chile) CHI	Claudio Maldonado	9	0	4+4	0	1	0	0	0
14	MF	(Paraguay) PAR	Víctor Cáceres	10	0	0	0	0	0	10	0
15	MF	(Brazil) BRA	Luiz Philipe Muralha	21	0	7+2	0	4+2	0	1+5	0
16	MF	(Brazil) BRA	Lucas Quintino	4	0	2+2	0	0	0	0	0
17	FW	(Brazil) BRA	Diego Maurício	12	0	3+4	0	0	0	4+1	0
18	MF	(Argentina) ARG	Darío Bottinelli	41	3	8+5	0	6+2	2	3+17	1
19	MF	(Brazil) BRA	Guilherme Negueba	29	1	1+11	1	0+5	0	7+5	0
20	FW	(Brazil) BRA	Thomas	17	0	5+1	0	1+1	0	7+2	0
21	DF	(Brazil) BRA	Magal	20	0	5+1	0	0+1	0	11+2	0
22	DF	(Brazil) BRA	Rafael Galhardo	7	0	5+1	0	1	0	0	0
22	FW	(Brazil) BRA	Hernane	14	3	0	0	0	0	7+7	3
23	MF	(Brazil) BRA	Guilherme Camacho	9	1	3+1	1	0+3	0	1+1	0
25	DF	(Brazil) BRA	Wellington Silva	19	0	0	0	0	0	18+1	0
26	FW	(Brazil) BRA	Jael	2	2	2	2	0	0	0	0
26	DF	(Brazil) BRA	Marllon	16	0	4	0	0	0	11+1	0
27	GK	(Brazil) BRA	Paulo Victor	25	0	4+1	0	2	0	17+1	0
28	GK	(Brazil) BRA	César	0	0	0	0	0	0	0	0
29	DF	(Brazil) BRA	Rodrigo Frauches	10	0	1	0	0	0	9	0
30	MF	(Brazil) BRA	Kleberson	9	4	4+2	4	0	0	3	0
30	FW	(Brazil) BRA	Nixon	7	1	0	0	0	0	1+6	1
31	DF	(Brazil) BRA	Rodrigo Alvim	0	0	0	0	0	0	0	0
31	FW	(Portugal) POR	Liédson	16	4	0	0	0	0	10+6	4
32	DF	(Brazil) BRA	Digão	1	0	0+1	0	0	0	0	0
33	MF	(Brazil) BRA	Rômulo	3	0	0+2	0	0	0	1	0
34	DF	(Brazil) BRA	João Felipe	3	0	3	0	0	0	0	0
35	GK	(Brazil) BRA	Marcelo Carné	0	0	0	0	0	0	0	0
36	MF	(Brazil) BRA	Lorran	1	0	1	0	0	0	0	0
37	MF	(Brazil) BRA	Adryan	24	3	1+1	1	0	0	7+15	2
38	DF	(Brazil) BRA	Arthur Sanches	3	0	0	0	0	0	2+1	0
39	FW	(Brazil) BRA	Paulo Sérgio	4	0	0+1	0	0	0	0+3	0
40	FW	(Brazil) BRA	Itamar	0	0	0	0	0	0	0	0
40	MF	(Brazil) BRA	Amaral	16	0	0	0	0	0	11+5	0
41	MF	(Brazil) BRA	Jorge Luiz	0	0	0	0	0	0	0	0
42	MF	(Brazil) BRA	Vítor Saba	0	0	0	0	0	0	0	0
42	MF	(Brazil) BRA	Fernandinho	1	0	0	0	0	0	0+1	0
43	MF	(Brazil) BRA	Mattheus	12	0	0+1	0	0	0	3+8	0
44	DF	(Brazil) BRA	Thiago Medeiros	2	0	0	0	0	0	1+1	0
45	DF	(Brazil) BRA	Felipe Dias	1	0	0	0	0	0	1	0
83	DF	(Brazil) BRA	Renato Santos	10	1	0	0	0	0	10	1
88	MF	(Brazil) BRA	Cléber Santana	12	1	0	0	0	0	12	1
99	FW	(Brazil) BRA	Vagner Love	50	21	9	7	5	2	36	12
-	DF	(Brazil) BRA	Alex Silva	0	0	0	0	0	0	0	0
TBA	MF	(Brazil) BRA	João Vitor	2	0	2	0	0	0	0	0
TBA	FW	(Brazil) BRA	Rafinha	0	0	0	0	0	0	0	0
TBA	FW	(Brazil) BRA	Romário	0	0	0	0	0	0	0	0
TBA	MF	(Brazil) BRA	Vítor Hugo	1	0	0+1	0	0	0	0	0
TBA	FW	(Brazil) BRA	Yguinho	1	0	0+1	0	0	0	0	0

=== Top scorers ===
Includes all competitive matches

Position	Nation	Number	Name	Rio State League	Copa Libertadores	Série A	Total
1	(Brazil)	99	Vágner Love	7	2	13	22
2	(Brazil)	11	Renato Abreu	1	0	6	7
2	(Brazil)	10	Ronaldinho	4	2	1	7
3	(Brazil)	9	Deivid	4	2	0	6
4	(Portugal)	31	Liédson	0	0	4	4
4	(Brazil)	8	Luiz Antônio	0	3	1	4
4	(Brazil)	30	Kleberson	4	0	0	4
5	(Brazil)	22	Hernane	0	0	3	3
5	(Brazil)	37	Adryan	1	0	2	3
5	(Argentina)	18	Darío Bottinelli	0	2	1	3
5	(Brazil)	2	Leonardo Moura	1	2	0	3
6	(Chile)	4	Marcos González	0	0	2	2
6	(Brazil)	26	Jael	2	0	0	2
7	(Brazil)	5	Airton	0	0	1	1
7	(Brazil)	6	Ramon	0	0	1	1
7	(Brazil)	7	Ibson	0	0	1	1
7	(Brazil)	30	Nixon	0	0	1	1
7	(Brazil)	88	Cléber Santana	0	0	1	1
7	(Brazil)	83	Renato Santos	0	0	1	1
7	(Brazil)	3	Welinton	0	1	0	1
7	(Brazil)	4	David Braz	1	0	0	1
7	(Brazil)	23	Guilherme Camacho	1	0	0	1
7	(Brazil)	19	Guilherme Negueba	1	0	0	1
			Own Goal	1	1	0	2
			Total	28	15	39	81

=== Clean sheets ===
Includes all competitive matches

Position	Nation	Number	Name	Rio State League	Copa Libertadores	Série A	Total
GK	(Brazil)	1	Felipe	4	2	7	13
GK	(Brazil)	27	Paulo Victor	4	1	4	9
GK	(Brazil)	28	César	0	0	0	0
GK	(Brazil)	35	Marcelo Carné	0	0	0	0
			Total	8	3	11	22

=== Disciplinary record ===
Position	Nation	Number	Name	Rio State League		Copa Libertadores		Série A		Total	
Position	Nation	Number	Name	Booked	Sent off (straight red)	Booked	Sent off (straight red)	Booked	Sent off (straight red)	Booked	Sent off (straight red)
GK	(Brazil)	1	Felipe	3	0	0	0	0	0	3	0
DF	(Brazil)	2	Leonardo Moura	1	0	2	0	3	1	6	1
DF	(Brazil)	3	Welinton	2	0	2	0	3	0	7	0
DF	(Brazil)	4	David Braz	5	0	1	0	0	0	6	0
DF	(Chile)	4	Marcos González	2	0	0	0	8	0	10	0
MF	(Brazil)	5	Airton	1	0	0	0	5	0	6	0
DF	(Brazil)	6	Júnior César	0	0	1	0	0	0	1	0
DF	(Brazil)	6	Ramon	0	0	0	0	7	1	7	1
MF	(Brazil)	7	Ibson	0	0	0	0	4	1	4	1
MF	(Brazil)	8	Willians	1	1	3	0	0	0	4	1
MF	(Brazil)	8	Luiz Antônio	1	1	1	0	4	1	6	2
FW	(Brazil)	9	Deivid	1	0	0	0	1	0	2	0
FW	(Brazil)	9	Wellington Bruno	0	0	0	0	1	0	1	0
MF	(Brazil)	10	Ronaldinho	2	1	1	0	0	0	3	1
MF	(Brazil)	11	Renato	0	1	2	0	4	0	6	1
DF	(Brazil)	13	Gustavo	1	0	1	0	0	0	2	0
MF	(Chile)	13	Claudio Maldonado	1	0	0	0	0	0	1	0
MF	(Paraguay)	14	Víctor Cáceres	0	0	0	0	3	0	3	0
MF	(Brazil)	15	Luiz Philipe Muralha	3	0	0	0	0	0	3	0
FW	(Brazil)	16	Lucas	0	0	0	0	0	0	0	0
FW	(Brazil)	17	Diego Maurício	3	0	0	0	0	0	3	0
MF	(Argentina)	18	Darío Bottinelli	5	1	4	0	2	0	11	1
MF	(Brazil)	19	Guilherme Negueba	3	0	1	0	2	0	6	0
FW	(Brazil)	20	Thomas	2	0	0	0	1	0	3	0
DF	(Brazil)	21	Magal	0	0	0	0	0	0	0	0
DF	(Brazil)	22	Rafael Galhardo	2	0	0	0	0	0	2	0
DF	(Brazil)	22	Hernane	0	0	0	0	1	0	1	0
MF	(Brazil)	23	Guilherme Camacho	0	0	0	0	0	0	0	0
DF	(Brazil)	25	Wellington Silva	0	0	0	0	5	1	5	1
FW	(Brazil)	26	Jael	0	0	0	0	1	0	1	0
DF	(Brazil)	26	Marllon	1	0	0	0	2	0	3	0
GK	(Brazil)	27	Paulo Victor	0	0	0	0	0	0	0	0
GK	(Brazil)	28	César	0	0	0	0	0	0	0	0
DF	(Brazil)	29	Rodrigo Frauches	1	0	0	0	1	0	2	0
MF	(Brazil)	30	Kléberson	1	0	0	0	1	0	2	0
DF	(Brazil)	31	Rodrigo Alvim	0	0	0	0	0	0	0	0
FW	(Portugal)	31	Liédson	0	0	0	0	0	0	0	0
DF	(Brazil)	32	Digão	0	0	0	0	0	0	0	0
MF	(Brazil)	33	Rômulo	0	0	0	0	0	0	0	0
MF	(Brazil)	34	João Felipe	1	0	0	0	0	0	1	0
GK	(Brazil)	35	Marcelo Carné	0	0	0	0	0	0	0	0
MF	(Brazil)	36	Lorran	0	0	0	0	0	0	0	0
MF	(Brazil)	37	Adryan	0	0	0	0	4	0	4	0
DF	(Brazil)	38	Arthur Sanches	0	0	0	0	0	0	0	0
FW	(Brazil)	39	Paulo Sérgio	0	0	0	0	0	1	0	1
FW	(Brazil)	40	Itamar	0	0	0	0	3	0	3	0
MF	(Brazil)	40	Amaral	0	0	0	0	3	0	3	0
MF	(Brazil)	41	Jorge Luiz	0	0	0	0	0	0	0	0
MF	(Brazil)	42	Vítor Saba	0	0	0	0	0	0	0	0
MF	(Brazil)	43	Mattheus	0	0	0	0	1	0	1	0
DF	(Brazil)	44	Thiago Medeiros	0	0	0	0	2	0	2	0
DF	(Brazil)	45	Felipe Dias	0	0	0	0	1	0	1	0
DF	(Brazil)	83	Renato Santos	0	0	0	0	1	0	1	0
MF	(Brazil)	88	Cleber Santana	0	0	0	0	1	0	1	0
FW	(Brazil)	99	Vágner Love	1	0	0	0	6	0	7	0
DF	(Brazil)		Alex Silva	0	0	0	0	0	0	0	0
FW	(Brazil)		Romário	0	0	0	0	0	0	0	0
MF	(Brazil)		João Vitor	0	0	0	0	0	0	0	0
FW	(Brazil)		Rafinha	0	0	0	0	0	0	0	0
			Total	44	5	20	0	80	6	145	11

=== Overview ===
Competition	First match	Last match	Starting round	Final position	Record							
Competition	First match	Last match	Starting round	Final position	Pld	W	D	L	GF	GA	GD	Win %
Série A	19 May 2012	1 December 2012	Matchday 1	11th	38	12	14	12	38	45	−7	31.58
Copa Libertadores	25 January 2012	12 April 2012	First stage	Group stage	8	3	2	3	15	12	+3	37.50
Campeonato Carioca	21 January 2012	22 April 2012	Matchday 1	Semifinal	17	11	3	3	30	14	+16	64.71
Total					63	26	19	18	83	71	+12	41.27

Source: Competitions

== Competitions ==
=== Pre-season friendlies ===
12 February	Flamengo	1–0	Londrina	Londrina
19:00 UTC−03:00	Darío Bottinelli 76'; Júnior César (yellow card) 9'; Luiz Philipe Muralha (yellow card) 90+1'	[ (Report)]	(yellow card) 30' Rogério	Stadium: Estádio do Café; Attendance: 4.414

15 February	Flamengo	2–2	Corinthians	Londrina
17:00 UTC−03:00	Darío Bottinelli 68'; Guilherme Negueba 80'; João Felipe (yellow card) 20'; Gustavo (yellow card) 69'; Luiz Philipe Muralha (yellow card) 87'	[ (Report)]	25' Alex; 45' Liédson; (yellow card) 36' Paulo André	Stadium: Estádio do Café

=== Campeonato Carioca ===
==== Taça Guanabara ====
Group A
Pos	Team	Pld	W	D	L	GF	GA	GD	Pts	Qualification or relegation
1	Botafogo	7	4	3	0	17	4	+13	15	Advanced to the Semifinals
2	Flamengo	7	4	3	0	10	1	+9	15	Advanced to the Semifinals
3	Resende	7	4	0	3	11	13	−2	12	Advanced to the Troféu Edilson Silva
4	Nova Iguaçu	7	2	3	2	6	7	−1	9	Advanced to the Troféu Edilson Silva
5	Macaé	7	2	2	3	6	8	−2	8	
6	Bonsucesso	7	1	3	3	7	13	−6	6	
7	Madureira	7	1	2	4	8	12	−4	5	
8	Olaria	7	1	2	4	5	12	−7	5	

Updated to match(es) played on 18 February 2012. Source:
Rules for classification: 1 points; 2 wins; 3 goal difference; 4 goals scored; 5 red cards received; 6 yellow cards received; 7 draw

===== Matches =====
21 January 1	Flamengo	4–0	Bonsucesso	Rio de Janeiro
17:00 UTC−03:00	Jael 27' 30'; Guilherme Camacho 72'; Adryan 88'; Claudio Maldonado (yellow card) 10'; Lucas Quintino (yellow card) 47'; Rodrigo Frauches (yellow card) 60'; Darío Bottinelli (yellow card) 83'; Adryan (yellow card) 89'		(yellow card) 33' Rafael Gomes; (yellow card) 67' Admilton; (yellow card) 81' Diogo	Stadium: Estádio Olímpico João Havelange (Engenhão); Attendance: 6.079; Referee: Wagner do Nascimento Magalhães

28 January 2	Macaé	0–0	Flamengo	Macaé
17:00 UTC−03:00	Douglas Assis (yellow card) 43'; André Gomes (yellow card) 54' (yellow-red card) 83'; Thiago Santos (yellow card) 90'		(yellow card) 32' Gustavo; (yellow card) 45' Guilherme Negueba; (yellow card) 52' Darío Bottinelli	Stadium: Estádio Cláudio Moacyr; Attendance: 5.643; Referee: Antonio Frederico de Carvalho Schneider

3 February 3	Flamengo	0–0	Olaria	Rio de Janeiro
17:00 UTC−03:00	João Felipe (yellow card) 12'; Thomas (yellow card) 52'		(yellow card) 5' Juninho; (yellow card) 35' Amarildo; (yellow card) 73' Vanilson; (yellow card) 76' Diego Santos; (yellow card) 79' Thiago Eleutério	Stadium: Estádio Olímpico João Havelange (Engenhão); Attendance: 3.131; Referee: Eduardo Cordeiro Guimarães

5 February 4	Botafogo	0–0	Flamengo	Rio de Janeiro
19:30 UTC−03:00	Marcelo Mattos (yellow card) 22'; Antônio Carlos (yellow card) 28'; Márcio Azevedo (yellow card) 45'; Maicosuel (yellow card) 77'		Luiz Antônio (yellow card) 32'; David Braz (yellow card) 39'; Willians (yellow card) 78' (yellow-red card) 78'; Guilherme Negueba (yellow card) 80'	Stadium: Estádio Olímpico João Havelange (Engenhão); Attendance: 12.439; Referee: Pathrice Wallace Corrêa Maia

9 February 5	Flamengo	1–0	Madureira	Rio de Janeiro
19:30 UTC−03:00	Thiago Medeiros 52' (o.g.); Welinton (yellow card) 31'; Felipe Ventura dos Santos (yellow card) 84'; David Braz (yellow card) 85'; Diego Maurício (yellow card) 90+1'		(yellow card) 26' Dinei; (yellow card) 81' Caio Cézar; (yellow card) 84' Leandro Cruz	Stadium: Estádio Olímpico João Havelange (Engenhão); Attendance: N/A; Referee: Lenilton Rodrigues Gomes Junior

12 February 6	Flamengo	2–0	Nova Iguaçu	Macaé
17:00 UTC−03:00	Deivid; Renato; Willians (yellow card)		(yellow card) Vagner Eugênio; (yellow card) Filipe Alves; (yellow card) Amaral	Stadium: Estádio Cláudio Moacyr

18 February 7	Resende	1–3	Flamengo	Volta Redonda
17:00 UTC−03:00	Marcelo Regis 47'; Filipe Machado (yellow card); Marcel (yellow card)		58' Ronaldinho; 62' Vágner Love; 82' Guilherme Negueba; (yellow card) Airton; (yellow card) David Braz; (yellow card) Vágner Love	Stadium: Estádio Raulino de Oliveira; Attendance: N/A; Referee: Marcelo de Lima Henrique

=== Semifinal ===
23 February	Vasco da Gama	2–1	Flamengo	Rio de Janeiro
22:00 UTC−03:00	Alecsandro 14'; Diego Souza 77'; Thiago Feltri (yellow card) 82'; Fellipe Bastos (yellow card) 90'		3' Vágner Love; (yellow card) 55' Ronaldinho; (yellow card) 82' Guilherme Negueba	Stadium: Estádio Olímpico João Havelange (Engenhão)

==== Taça Rio ====
Group A
Pos	Team	Pld	W	D	L	GF	GA	GD	Pts	Qualification or relegation
1	Flamengo	8	7	0	1	17	8	+9	21	Advanced to the Semifinals
2	Botafogo	8	5	3	0	18	8	+10	18	Advanced to the Semifinals
3	Resende	8	3	4	1	9	8	+1	13	Advanced to the Troféu Luiz Penido
4	Macaé	8	4	0	4	13	14	−1	12	Advanced to the Troféu Luiz Penido
5	Madureira	8	3	1	4	11	13	−2	10	
6	Olaria	8	2	3	3	8	12	−4	9	
7	Nova Iguaçu	8	2	2	4	8	13	−5	8	
8	Bonsucesso	8	1	4	3	10	13	−3	7	

Updated to match(es) played on 15 April. Source:
Rules for classification: 1 points; 2 wins; 3 goal difference; 4 goals scored; 5 red cards received; 6 yellow cards received; 7 draw

===== Matches =====
29 February 1	Flamengo	1–2	Boavista	Macaé
16:00 UTC−03:00	5' Vágner Love; (yellow card) 20' Darío Bottinelli; (yellow card) 58' Felipe; (yellow card) 69' Deivid; (red card) Renato		Somália 45+2'(p.k.); Paulo Rodrigues 56'; Thiaguinho (yellow card) 23'; Tony (yellow card) 34'; Paulo Rodrigues (yellow card) 63'; Júlio César (yellow card) 67'; Bruno Costa (yellow card) 70'; Thiago Schmidt (red card)	Stadium: Estádio Cláudio Moacyr

4 March 2	Duque de Caxias	1–2	Flamengo	Macaé
18:30 UTC−03:00	60' Rodrigues; (yellow card) 61' Rafinha; (yellow card) 78' Jorge Fellipe; (yellow card) 80' Romário		Vágner Love 9'; Ronaldinho 82'(p.k.); Marcos González (yellow card) 14'; Muralha (yellow card) 67'; Darío Bottinelli (red card)	Stadium: Estádio Cláudio Moacyr; Attendance: 5.596; Referee: Pericles Bassols Pegado Cortez

11 March 3	Flamengo	2–0	Fluminense	Rio de Janeiro
18:30 UTC−03:00	22' (p.k.) Ronaldinho; Kleberson; (yellow card) 6' Rafael Galhardo; (yellow card) 7' (yellow-red card) 41' Ronaldinho; (yellow card) 82' Marcos González; (yellow card) 70' Muralha; (yellow card) 60' Thomas		Thiago Carleto (yellow card) 6'; Diguinho (yellow card) 33'; Anderson (yellow card) 89'	Stadium: Estádio Olímpico João Havelange (Engenhão)

18 March 4	Friburguense	0–1	Flamengo	Macaé
16:00 UTC−03:00	(yellow card) 32' Zé Vitor		Kléberson 80'; Marcos González (yellow card) 71'	Stadium: Estádio Cláudio Moacyr; Attendance: 2.267

24 March 5	Volta Redonda	2–4	Flamengo	Volta Redonda
18:30 UTC−03:00	16' Rafael Cruz; 63' Leílton; (yellow card) 11' Leílton; (yellow card) 22' (yellow-red card) 84' Robson; (yellow card) 31' Douglas; (yellow card) 71' Rafael Cruz; (red card) João Paulo		David Braz 33'; Vágner Love 48' 75'; Léo Moura 90+2'; (red card) Luiz Antônio; Diego Maurício (yellow card) 55'; David Braz (yellow card) 59'	Stadium: Estádio Raulino de Oliveira; Attendance: 10.301; Referee: Luís Antônio Silva Santos

1 April 6	Flamengo	2–1	Bangu	Macaé
16:00 UTC−03:00	Vágner Love 17' 35'; (yellow card) 47' Marcos González		Sérgio Júnior 74'; Josivaldo Oliveira (yellow card) 21'; Fernando Lopes (yellow card) 72'; Raphael (yellow card) 81'	Stadium: Estádio Cláudio Moacyr; Attendance: 5.127; Referee: Grazianni Maciel Rocha

7 April 7	Vasco da Gama	1–2	Flamengo	Rio de Janeiro
18:30 UTC−03:00	51' Diego Souza; (yellow card) 14' Renato Silva; (yellow card) 55' Fagner; (yellow card) 78' Thiago Feltri; (yellow card) 83' Eduardo Costa; (yellow card) 90' Alecsandro		Deivid 51'; Ronaldinho 90+2'(p.k.); Léo Moura (yellow card) 36'; Diego Maurício (yellow card) 90+4'	Stadium: Estádio Olímpico João Havelange (Engenhão); Referee: Wagner dos Santos Rosa

15 April 8	Flamengo	3–1	Americano	Rio de Janeiro
16:00 UTC−03:00	9' (p.k.) 86' Deivid; 76' Kleberson; (yellow card) 40' Marllon; (yellow card) 42' Darío Bottinelli; (yellow card) 44' Rafael Galhardo		Diego Neves 70'; Jader (yellow card) 65'; Marconi (yellow card) 75'	Stadium: Estádio Olímpico João Havelange (Engenhão); Attendance: 4.104; Referee: Carlos Eduardo Nunes Braga

=== Semifinal ===
22 April	Vasco da Gama	3–2	Flamengo	Rio de Janeiro
16:00 UTC−03:00	51' Diego Souza; (yellow card) 14' Renato Silva; (yellow card) 55' Fagner; (yellow card) 78' Thiago Feltri; (yellow card) 83' Eduardo Costa; (yellow card) 90' Alecsandro		Vágner Love 2'; Kléberson 52'; Muralha (yellow card) 31'; Felipe (yellow card) 47' kléberson (yellow card) 66'; Darío Bottinelli (yellow card) 75'; Welinton (yellow card) 90+1'	Stadium: Estádio Olímpico João Havelange (Engenhão); Attendance: 20.067; Referee: Marcelo de Lima Henrique

=== Standings ===
Pos	Team	Pld	W	D	L	GF	GA	GD	Pts
9	Cruzeiro	38	15	7	16	47	51	−4	52
10	Internacional	38	13	13	12	44	40	+4	52
11	Flamengo	38	12	14	12	38	45	−7	50
12	Náutico	38	14	7	17	44	51	−7	49
13	Coritiba	38	14	6	18	53	60	−7	48

Updated to match(es) played on unknown. Source: UOL.com.br
Rules for classification: 1st points; 2nd wins; 3rd goal difference; 4th goals scored; 5th head-to-head results; 6th least red cards received; 7th least yellow cards received; 8th draw

=== Results summary ===
Overall								Home						Away					
Pld	W	D	L	GF	GA	GD	Pts	W	D	L	GF	GA	GD	W	D	L	GF	GA	GD
38	12	14	12	39	46	−7	50	8	8	3	23	18	+5	4	6	9	16	28	−12

Last updated: 9 December 2012.
Source: Série A 2012

Pld=Matches played; W=Matches won; D=Matches drawn; L=Matches lost;

==== Results by round ====
Round	1	2	3	4	5	6	7	8	9	10	11	12	13	14	15	16	17	18	19	20	21	22	23	24	25	26	27	28	29	30	31	32	33	34	35	36	37	38
Ground	A	H	A	H	H	A	H	A	A	H	A	H	A	H	A	H	A	H	A	H	A	H	A	A	H	A	H	H	A	H	A	H	A	H	A	H	A	H
Result	D	D	D	W	W	L	W	L	W	L	L	D	L	W	W	W	L	W	D	D	L	L	L	L	D	W	L	L	D	D	D	W	D	W	W	D	D	D
Position	7	9	12	8	7	9	9	10	9	10	10	10	11	10	9	8	9	7	7	8	9	10	11	11	10	10	11	13	15	15	15	14	14	12	9	11	11	11

Updated to match(es) played on 9 December 2012. Source: Matches
A = Away; H = Home; W = Win; D = Draw; L = Loss

==== Matches ====
19 May 1	Sport	1–1	Flamengo	Recife
18:30 UTC−03:00	Marquinhos Gabriel 58'; Edcarlos (yellow card) 29'; Naldinho (yellow card) 48'		74' Vágner Love; (yellow card) 48' Darío Bottinelli; (yellow card) 53' Welinton	Stadium: Estádio Ilha do Retiro; Attendance: 28.636; Referee: Paulo César de Oliveira

26 May 2	Flamengo	3–3	Internacional	Rio de Janeiro
18:30 UTC−03:00	Airton 9'; Ronaldinho 17'(pen.); Vágner Love 48'; Vágner Love (yellow card) 44'; Airton (yellow card) 57'; Kleberson (yellow card) 65'		34' Gilberto; 67' Fabrício; 70' Jesús Dátolo; (yellow card) 58' Elton; (yellow card) 65' Jesús Dátolo; (yellow card) 68' Pablo Guiñazú	Stadium: Estádio Olímpico João Havelange (Engenhão); Attendance: 19.274; Referee: André Luiz de Freitas Castro

6 June 3	Ponte Preta	2–2	Flamengo	Campinas
21:50 UTC−03:00	Renê Junior 15'; Nikão 50'; Tiago Alves (yellow card) 27'; João Paulo Silva (yellow card) 43'; Édson Bastos (yellow card) 76'; Renê Junior (yellow card) 84'; Caio (yellow card) 90+1'; Roger (red card)		28' Renato Abreu; 90+3' Vágner Love; (yellow card) 61' Deivid; (yellow card) 67' Ibson; (yellow card) 72' Wellington Silva; (yellow card) 85' Vágner Love	Stadium: Estádio Moisés Lucarelli; Attendance: 5.365; Referee: Wagner Reway

9 June 4	Flamengo	3–1	Coritiba	Rio de Janeiro
18:30 UTC−03:00	Vágner Love 5'; Luiz Antônio 12'; Hernane 90+1'; Airton (yellow card) 57'; Hernane (yellow card) 90+2'		24' Émerson; (yellow card) 54' Roberto; (yellow card) 69' Willian; (yellow card) 90+3' Tcheco	Stadium: Estádio Olímpico João Havelange (Engenhão); Attendance: 6.142; Referee: Rodrigo Braghetto

17 June 5	Flamengo	1–0	Santos	Rio de Janeiro
16:00 UTC−03:00	Darío Bottinelli 87'(pen.); Darío Bottinelli (yellow card) 67'		(yellow card) 47' Éwerton Pascoa; (yellow card) 65' Geuvânio; (yellow card) 66' Anderson Carvalho; (yellow card) 84' Gérson Magrão	Stadium: Estádio Olímpico João Havelange (Engenhão); Attendance: 17.373; Referee: Francisco Carlos do Nascimento

24 June 6	Grêmio	2–0	Flamengo	Porto Alegre
16:00 UTC−03:00	Marcelo Moreno 33'; Werley 49'; Fernando (yellow card) 45+2'		(yellow card) 67' Marcos González; (yellow card) 77' Airton; (yellow card) 90' Marllon	Stadium: Estádio Olímpico; Attendance: 18.601; Referee: Wilson Luíz Seneme

1 July 7	Flamengo	3–2	Atlético Goianiense	Rio de Janeiro
18:30 UTC−03:00	Renato 35' 61'; Adryan 57'		28' 80' Felipe; (yellow card) 40' Gilson; (yellow card) 53' Marcos; (yellow card) 60' Gabriel	Stadium: Estádio Olímpico João Havelange (Engenhão); Attendance: 6.645; Referee: Héber Roberto Lopes

8 July 8	Fluminense	1–0	Flamengo	Rio de Janeiro
16:00 UTC−03:00	Fred 11'; Fred (yellow card) 6'; Deco (yellow card) 24'; Bruno Vieira (yellow card) 79'; Carlinhos (yellow card) 82'		(yellow card) 10' Marcos González; (yellow card) 70' Ibson	Stadium: Estádio Olímpico João Havelange (Engenhão); Attendance: 38.862; Referee: Wagner do Nascimento Magalhães

15 July 9	Bahia	1–2	Flamengo	Salvador
16:00 UTC−03:00	Kleberson 38'; Fahel (yellow card) 15'; Mancini (yellow card) 71'; Júnior (yellow card) 90+2'		31' Hernane; 72'(pen.) Renato; (yellow card) 19' (yellow-red card) 44' Luiz Antônio; (yellow card) 73' Renato	Stadium: Estádio de Pituaçu; Attendance: 29.206; Referee: Francisco Carlos do Nascimento

18 July 10	Flamengo	0–3	Corinthians	Rio de Janeiro
21:50 UTC−03:00	Airton (yellow card) 72'; Adryan (yellow card) 89'		28' 40' Douglas; 55' Danilo; (yellow card) 31' Chicão	Stadium: Estádio Olímpico João Havelange (Engenhão); Attendance: 14.897; Referee: Sandro Meira Ricci

22 July 11	Cruzeiro	0–1	Flamengo	Belo Horizonte
16:00 UTC−03:00	Borges 45'; Charles (yellow card) 50'; Marcelo Oliveira (yellow card) 56'		(yellow card) 52' Airton; (yellow card) 82' Marllon	Stadium: Estádio Independência; Attendance: 16.277; Referee: Héber Roberto Lopes

26 July 12	Flamengo	0–0	Portuguesa	Rio de Janeiro
21:00 UTC−03:00			(yellow card) 79' Valdomiro	Stadium: Estádio Olímpico João Havelange (Engenhão); Attendance: 8.184; Referee: Ricardo Marques Ribeiro

29 July 13	São Paulo	4–1	Flamengo	São Paulo
16:00 UTC−03:00	Maicon 42'; Luís Fabiano 45+2' 60'; Jádson 90+3'; Luís Fabiano (yellow card) 45+3'; Rodrigo Caio (yellow card) 77'		67' Ramon; (yellow card) 90' Ramon	Stadium: Estádio do Morumbi; Attendance: 35.049; Referee: Jaílson Macedo Freitas

8 August 15	Figueirense	0–2	Flamengo	Florianópolis
19:30 UTC−03:00	Anderson Conceição (yellow card) 28' (yellow-red card) 34'; Jackson (yellow card) 57'; Sebastián Abreu (yellow card) 90'		62' 86' Vágner Love; (yellow card) 13' Thiago Medeiros; (red card) Léo Moura; (yellow card) 55' Luiz Antônio; (yellow card) 70' Vágner Love	Stadium: Estádio Orlando Scarpelli; Attendance: 11.587; Referee: Leandro Vuaden

11 August 16	Flamengo	2–0	Náutico	Volta Redonda
21:00 UTC−03:00	Vágner Love 14' 44'; Wellington Silva (yellow card) 80'; Guilherme Negueba (yellow card) 70'; Marcos González (yellow card) 80'		(yellow card) 22' Rhayner; (yellow card) 31' Marlon; (yellow card) 87' Souza	Stadium: Estádio Raulino de Oliveira; Attendance: 7.073; Referee: Jean Pierre Gonçalves Lima

15 August 17	Palmeiras	1–0	Flamengo	Barueri
21:50 UTC−03:00	Hernán Barcos 33'; Patrik (yellow card) 6'; Maurício Ramos (yellow card) 29'; Artur (yellow card) 38'; Thiago Heleno (yellow card) 46'; Henrique (yellow card) 67'; Juninho (yellow card) 74'; Hernán Barcos (yellow card) 76'; Obina (yellow card) 88'		(yellow card) 8' (yellow-red card) 29' Ibson; (yellow card) 39' Marllon; (yellow card) 40' Thomas; (yellow card) 71' Renato; (yellow card) 90+4' Mattheus	Stadium: Arena Barueri; Attendance: 7.500; Referee: Célio Amorim

19 August 18	Flamengo	1–0	Vasco da Gama	Rio de Janeiro
18:30 UTC−03:00	Vágner Love 38'; Marcos González (yellow card) 19'; Guilherme Negueba (yellow card) 29'; Adryan (yellow card) 82'; Léo Moura (yellow card) 88'		(yellow card) 21' Felipe; (yellow card) 30' Nílton; (yellow card) 47' Carlos Alberto	Stadium: Estádio Olímpico João Havelange (Engenhão); Attendance: 19.469; Referee: Marcelo de Lima Henrique

26 August 19	Botafogo	0–0	Flamengo	Rio de Janeiro
16:00 UTC−03:00	Brinner (yellow card) 12'; Lucas (yellow card) 40'; Márcio Azevedo (yellow card) 85'; Cidinho (yellow card) 87'		Víctor Cáceres (yellow card) 22'; Marcos González (yellow card) 60'	Stadium: Estádio Olímpico João Havelange (Engenhão); Attendance: 19.471; Referee: Pericles Bassols Pegado Cortez

30 August 20	Flamengo	1–1	Sport	Rio de Janeiro
21:00 UTC−03:00	Ibson 13'; Vágner Love (yellow card) 83'		Felipe Azevedo 20'; Henrique (yellow card) 72'; Rithely (yellow card) 74'; Willian Rocha (red card) 90'; Hugo (yellow card) 90+1'	Stadium: Estádio Olímpico João Havelange (Engenhão); Attendance: 8.142; Referee: Ricardo Marques Ribeiro

2 September 21	Internacional	4–1	Flamengo	Porto Alegre
16:00 UTC−03:00	Forlán 29', 66'; Josimar 40'; Leandro Damião 75'; Fred (yellow card) 68'; Leandro Damião (yellow card) 74' (goal) 75'; Guiñazú (yellow card) 83'; Josimar (yellow card) 90+1'		Vágner Love 14'; Víctor Cáceres (yellow card) 56'; Marcos González (yellow card) 87'	Stadium: Estádio Beira-Rio; Attendance: 12.115; Referee: Wilson Luiz Seneme

5 September 22	Flamengo	0–1	Ponte Preta	Volta Redonda
19:30 UTC−03:00	Ramon (yellow card) 73'; Thiago Medeiros (yellow card) 86'		Uendel 20'; Ferron (yellow card) 22'; Édson Bastos (yellow card) 46'; Cicinho (yellow card) 64'; André Luís (yellow card) 90+4'	Stadium: Estádio Raulino de Oliveira; Attendance: 4.087; Referee: Elmo Alves Resende Cunha

8 September 23	Coritiba	3–0	Flamengo	Curitiba
18:30 UTC−03:00	Lincoln 17'; Rafinha 57'; Éverton Ribeiro 72'; Lincoln (yellow card) 26'; Gil (yellow card) 27'; Deivid (yellow card) 29'; Raúl Ruidíaz (yellow card) 81'		Magal (yellow card) 30'	Stadium: Estádio Couto Pereira; Attendance: 13.680; Referee: Sandro Meira Ricci

12 September 24	Santos	2–0	Flamengo	Santos
22:00 UTC−03:00	Victor Andrade 85' (yellow card) 86'; Neymar 87'; Durval (yellow card) 40'; Adriano (yellow card) 45+2'; Felipe Anderson (yellow card) 69'		Welinton (yellow card) 18'; Leonardo Moura (yellow card) 25'; Luiz Antônio (yellow card) 34'	Stadium: Estádio Vila Belmiro; Attendance: 8.015; Referee: Márcio Chagas da Silva

16 September 25	Flamengo	1–1	Grêmio	Rio de Janeiro
18:30 UTC−03:00	Leonardo Moura (yellow card) 38'; Adryan 62'; González (yellow card) 90'		Moreno 18'; Gilberto Silva (yellow card) 70'; Vilson (yellow card) 86'	Stadium: Estádio Olímpico João Havelange (Engenhão); Attendance: 15.625; Referee: Ricardo Marques Ribeiro

23 September 26	Atlético Goianiense	1–2	Flamengo	Goiânia
16:00 UTC−03:00	Joílson 10'; Diogo Campos (yellow card) 42'; Eron (yellow card) 72'; Dodô (yellow card) 83'		36' Cléber Santana; 66' Liédson	Stadium: Estádio Serra Dourada; Attendance: 23.887; Referee: Paulo Cesar de Oliveira

26 September 14	Flamengo	2–1	Atlético Mineiro	Rio de Janeiro
21:50 UTC−03:00	Vágner Love 21'; Liédson 56'; Víctor Cáceres (yellow card) 73'		50' Jô; (yellow card) 39' Carlos César; (yellow card) 73' Jô; (red card) Réver; (yellow card) 77' Richarlyson	Stadium: Estádio Olímpico João Havelange (Engenhão); Attendance: 39.060; Referee: Jaílson Macedo Freitas

30 September 27	Flamengo	0–1	Fluminense	Rio de Janeiro
16:00 UTC−03:00	Vágner Love (yellow card) 9'; Amaral (yellow card) 54'; Ramon (yellow card) 68' (yellow-red card) 90+2'		18' Fred; (yellow card) 30' Thiago Neves; (yellow card) 40' Digão; (yellow card) 74' Edinho; (yellow card) 77' Fred; (yellow card) 90+1'	Stadium: Estádio Olímpico João Havelange (Engenhão); Attendance: 25.313; Referee: Marcelo de Lima Henrique

4 October 28	Flamengo	0–0	Bahia	Rio de Janeiro
21:00 UTC−03:00			(yellow card) 77' Fahel; (yellow card) 86' Kleberson; (yellow card) 89' Hélder	Stadium: Estádio Olímpico João Havelange (Engenhão); Attendance: 25.777; Referee: Wagner Reway

10 October 29	Corinthians	3–2	Flamengo	São Paulo
22:00 UTC−03:00	Edenílson 61'; Paulo André 75'; Emerson 90'; Fábio Santos (yellow card) 43'; Emerson (yellow card) 70'		30' Renato Santos; 90+3' Liédson; (yellow card) 26' Amaral; (yellow card) 50' Welinton; (yellow card) 73' Renato Abreu	Stadium: Estádio do Pacaembu; Attendance: 26.862; Referee: Fabrício Neves Corrêa

13 October 30	Flamengo	1–1	Cruzeiro	Rio de Janeiro
18:30 UTC−03:00	Liédson 11'; Adryan (yellow card) 66'; Vágner Love (yellow card) 69'; Ramon (yellow card) 76'; Cléber Santana (yellow card) 79'; Wellington Silva (yellow card) 87'		19' Everton; (yellow card) 23' Leandro Guerreiro; (yellow card) 38' Marcelo Oliveira; (yellow card) 65' Charles	Stadium: Estádio Olímpico João Havelange (Engenhão); Attendance: 20.833; Referee: Anderson Daronco

17 October 31	Portuguesa	0–0	Flamengo	São Paulo
22:00 UTC−03:00	Bruno Mineiro (yellow card) 61'; Rogério (yellow card) 82'		(yellow card) 45' Airton; (yellow card) 77' Luiz Antônio; (yellow card) 90+1' Ramon	Stadium: Estádio do Canindé; Attendance: 5.892 (payers only); Referee: André Luiz de Freitas Castro

21 October 32	Flamengo	1–0	São Paulo	Rio de Janeiro
16:00 UTC−03:00	Marcos González 71'; Amaral (yellow card) 81'		(yellow card) 51' Jádson; (yellow card) 71' Wellington	Stadium: Estádio Olímpico João Havelange (Engenhão); Attendance: 21.631; Referee: Leandro Pedro Vuaden

31 October 33	Atlético Mineiro	1–1	Flamengo	Belo Horizonte
21:50 UTC−03:00	Leonardo 58'; Leonardo Silva (yellow card) 44'; Pierre 61'; Carlos César (red card) 65'		28' Renato; (yellow card) 19' (yellow-red card) 43' Wellington Silva; (yellow card) 45+3' Ibson; (yellow card) 54' Renato; (yellow card) 79' Amaral	Stadium: Estádio Independência; Attendance: 19.945 (payers only); Referee: Sandro Meira Ricci

3 November 34	Flamengo	1–0	Figueirense	Volta Redonda
21:00 UTC−03:00	Hernane 72'; Ramon (yellow card) 37'; Renato Santos (yellow card) 41'; Adryan (yellow card) 76'		(yellow card) 4' Raphael Botti; (yellow card) 8' Túlio; (yellow card) 62' Guti	Stadium: Estádio Raulino de Oliveira; Attendance: 6.776; Referee: Emerson Almeida Ferreira

11 November 35	Náutico	0–1	Flamengo	Recife
19:30 UTC−03:00	Dadá (yellow card) 38'; Kieza (yellow card) 83'		82'(pen.) Renato; (yellow card) 44' Felipe Dias	Stadium: Estádio dos Aflitos; Attendance: 19.252; Referee: Guilherme Cereta de Lima

18 November 36	Flamengo	1–1	Palmeiras	Volta Redonda
17:00 UTC−03:00	Vágner Love 89'; Amaral (yellow card) 79'; Paulo Sérgio (red card)		63' Vinícius; (yellow card) 61' Corrêa; (yellow card) 72' Hernán Barcos; (yellow card) 86' Adalberto Román	Stadium: Estádio Raulino de Oliveira; Attendance: 10.623; Referee: André Luiz de Freitas Castro

24 November 37	Vasco da Gama	1–1	Flamengo	Rio de Janeiro
19:30 UTC−03:00	Nilton 34'; Nilton (yellow card) 9'; Jonas (yellow card) 48'; Abuda (yellow card) 58'; Fellipe Bastos (yellow card) 77'; Fernando Prass (yellow card) 83'; Douglas (yellow card) 85'		87' Marcos González; (yellow card) 19' Ramon; (yellow card) 24' Wellington Silva	Stadium: Estádio Olímpico João Havelange (Engenhão); Attendance: 9.416; Referee: Wagner Nascimento Magalhães

1 December 38	Flamengo	2–2	Botafogo	Rio de Janeiro
19:30 UTC−03:00	Nixon 33'; Vágner Love 56'; Amaral (yellow card) 22'; Marcos González (yellow card) 64'; Wellington Bruno (yellow card) 71'		5' Sassá; 48' Vitor Júnior; (yellow card) 24'Jadson; (yellow card) 30' Renato; (yellow card) 54' Nicolás Lodeiro; (yellow card) 83' Vitor Júnior	Stadium: Estádio Olímpico João Havelange (Engenhão); Attendance: 9.380; Referee: Felipe Gomes da Silva

=== Copa Libertadores ===
==== Copa Libertadores squad ====
As of 13 February 2012, according to combined sources on the official website.
In Conmebol competitions players must be assigned numbers between 1 and 25.

Note: Flags indicate national team as defined under FIFA eligibility rules; some limited exceptions apply. Players may hold more than one non-FIFA nationality.

No.	Pos.	Nation	Player
1	GK	BRA	Felipe
2	DF	BRA	Leonardo Moura
3	DF	BRA	Welinton
4	DF	BRA	David Braz
5	MF	BRA	Airton
6	DF	BRA	Júnior César
7	MF	BRA	Luiz Antônio
8	MF	BRA	Willians
9	FW	BRA	Deivid
10	MF	BRA	Ronaldinho
11	MF	BRA	Renato
12	GK	BRA	Paulo Victor
13	DF	BRA	Gustavo
14	DF	BRA	Marllon (Replaced)

No.	Pos.	Nation	Player
14	DF	CHI	Marcos González
15	MF	BRA	Luiz Philipe Muralha
16	FW	BRA	Lucas
17	FW	BRA	Jael (Replaced)
17	FW	BRA	Vágner Love
18	MF	ARG	Darío Bottinelli
19	FW	BRA	Guilherme Negueba
20	FW	BRA	Thomas
21	DF	BRA	Magal
22	DF	BRA	Guilherme Camacho
23	DF	BRA	João Felipe (Replaced)
23	DF	BRA	Rafael Galhardo
24	GK	BRA	César
25	MF	CHI	Claudio Maldonado

=== First stage ===
25 January First leg	Real Potosí (Bolivia)	2–1	(Brazil) Flamengo	Potosí
21:50 (UTC−03:00)	Claudio Centurión 31'; Edgardo Britez 57'; Rony Jiménez (yellow card) 53'; Alberto Alarcón (yellow card) 59'	(Report)	29' Luiz Antônio; (yellow card) 30' Léo Moura; (yellow card) 64' Darío Bottinelli; (yellow card) 75' Willians	Stadium: Estadio Víctor Agustín Ugarte; Attendance: N/A; Referee: Liber Prudente

1 February Second leg	Flamengo (Brazil)	2–0 (3–2 agg.)	(Bolivia) Real Potosí	Rio de Janeiro
21:50 (UTC−03:00)	Léo Moura 39'; Ronaldinho 90+2'; Léo Moura (yellow card) 20'; Renato Abreu (yellow card) 24'; Willians (yellow card) 85'	(Report)	(yellow card) 43' (yellow-red card) 78' Claudio Centurion; (yellow card) 46' Alberto Alarcón; (yellow card) 59' Gerardo Yecerotte; (yellow card) 89' Edgardo Brittes	Stadium: Estádio Olímpico João Havelange (Engenhão); Attendance: 36.000; Referee: Víctor Rivera

==== Second stage ====
The Second Stage, played in home-and-away round-robin format, began on 7 February and will end on 19 April. The top two teams from each group will advance to the Round of 16.

===== Group 2 =====
Pos	Team	Pld	W	D	L	GF	GA	GD	Pts	LAN	EME	FLA	OLI
1	(Argentina) Lanús	6	3	1	2	11	6	+5	10		1–0	1–1	6–0
2	(Ecuador) Emelec	6	3	0	3	7	8	−1	9	0–2		3–2	1–0
3	(Brazil) Flamengo	6	2	2	2	12	10	+2	8	3–0	1–0		3–3
4	(Paraguay) Olimpia	6	2	1	3	10	16	−6	7	2–1	2–3	3–2	

Legend: Blue = home team win; Yellow = draw; Red = away team win.

===== Matches =====
15 February 1	Lanús (Argentina)	1–1	Flamengo	Lanús
22:00 UTC−03:00	César Carranza 74'; Matías Fritzler (yellow card) 83'	Report	45' Léo Moura; (yellow card) 29' Renato; (yellow card) 61' Welinton; (yellow card) 89' Darío Bottinelli	Stadium: Estadio Ciudad de Lanús; Attendance: 20.000; Referee: Roberto Silvera (Uruguay)

8 March 2	Flamengo (Brazil)	1–0	(Ecuador) Emelec	Rio de Janeiro
19:30 UTC−03:00	Vágner Love 48'; Darío Bottinelli (yellow card) 80'	Report	(yellow card) 36' Pedro Quiñónez; (red card) Marlon de Jesús; (yellow card) 74' Carlos Quiñónez	Stadium: Estádio Olímpico João Havelange (Engenhão); Attendance: 31.859; Referee: Darío Ubriaco (Uruguay)

15 March 3	Flamengo (Brazil)	3–3	(Paraguay) Olimpia	Rio de Janeiro
22:00 UTC−03:00	Darío Bottinelli 37'; Ronaldinho 56' (pen.); Luiz Antônio 63'; Rafael Galhardo (yellow card) 27'; Guilherme Negueba (yellow card) 85'	Report	76' Pablo Zeballos; 84' Luis Caballero; 88' Vladimir Marín; (yellow card) 21' Fabio Caballero; (yellow card) 22' Eduardo Aranda; (yellow card) 24' Sergio Orteman; (yellow card) 45+2' Adrián Romero; (yellow card) 55' Martín Silva; (yellow card) 77' Vladimir Marín	Stadium: Estádio Olímpico João Havelange (Engenhão); Attendance: 30.755; Referee: José Buitrago (Colombia)

28 March 4	Olimpia (Paraguay)	3–2	Flamengo	Asunción
22:00 UTC−03:00	Sergio Orteman 6'; Pablo Zeballos 52'; Eduardo Aranda 70'; Eduardo Aranda (yellow card) 14'; Francisco Nájera (yellow card) 35'; Enrique Gabriel Meza (yellow card) 62'; Martín Silva (yellow card) 90+2'	Report	48' Vágner Love; 77' Darío Bottinelli; (yellow card) 53' David Braz	Stadium: Estadio Defensores del Chaco; Attendance: N/A; Referee: Enrique Osses (Chile)

4 April 5	Emelec (Ecuador)	3–2	Flamengo	Guayaquil
19:50 UTC−05:00	Luciano Figueroa 33' 37'; Fernando Gaibor 90' (pen.); Fernando Gaibor (yellow card) 21'; Gabriel Achilier (yellow card) 69'	Report	8'(o.g.) Óscar Bagüí; 42' Deivid; (yellow card) 76' Gustavo; (yellow card) 90+2' Júnior César	Stadium: Estadio George Capwell; Attendance: N/A; Referee: Martín Vázquez (Uruguay)

12 April 6	Flamengo (Brazil)	3–0	(Argentina) Lanús	Rio de Janeiro
19:30 UTC−03:00	Welinton 17'; Deivid 41'; Luiz Antônio 49'; Welinton (yellow card) 75'	Report	(yellow card) 68' Diego González	Stadium: Estádio Olímpico João Havelange (Engenhão); Attendance: N/A; Referee: Wilmar Roldán (Colombia)

== Honors ==
=== Individuals ===
Name	Number	Country	Award
Kleberson	30	(Brazil)	2012 Campeonato Carioca best central midfielder
Vágner Love	99	(Brazil)	2012 Campeonato Carioca best central striker

== IFFHS ranking ==
Flamengo position on the Club World Ranking during the 2012 season, according to IFFHS.

Month	Position	Points
January	92	126
February	79	133
March	72	140
April	65	149
May	52	161
June	55	157
July	59	147
August	90	123
September	77	129
October	77	125
November	95	125
December	97	125

Last updated: 2013-01-10.
Source: IFFHS
