= Thiago Duchatsch =

Brazilian footballer

Personal information
- Full name: Thiago Duchatsch Moreira
- Date of birth: 16 April 1997 (age 29)
- Place of birth: Bauru, Brazil
- Height: 1.90 m (6 ft 3 in)
- Position: Centre back

Team information
- Current team: Chiangmai United
- Number: 33

Youth career
- PSTC
- 2014: Atlético Paranaense
- 2015–2016: Desportivo Brasil
- 2016–2018: Corinthians

Senior career*
Years	Team	Apps	(Gls)
2018–2019	Santos	0	(0)
2019	→ Tupi (loan)	5	(0)
2019	→ Sampaio Corrêa (loan)	0	(0)
2020	Sampaio Corrêa	1	(0)
2020	Juventus-SP	5	(0)
2020–2022	Nacional de Muriaé	3	(0)
2022–2023	Ayutthaya United	32	(5)
2023	North Bangkok University	9	(0)
2024	Esporte Clube Noroeste	?	(?)
2024	Costa Rica Esporte Clube	4	(0)
2024	Police Tero	9	(0)
2025–	Samut Sakhon City	0	(0)
- * Club domestic league appearances and goals as of 6 July 2025 (UTC)

Thiago Duchatsch Moreira (born 16 April 1997) is a Brazilian footballer who plays as a central defender for Thai League 2 club Chiangmai United.

== Club career ==
Born in Bauru, São Paulo, Duchatsch joined Corinthians' youth setup in April 2016, from Desportivo Brasil. On 29 May 2018, he moved to Santos and was assigned to the B-team.

On 4 January 2019, Duchatsch joined Tupi on loan for the season. He made his professional debut late in the month, coming on as a first-half substitute for injured Arthur Sanches in a 1–1 Campeonato Mineiro home draw against Villa Nova.

On 29 July 2019, after being rarely used, Duchatsch moved to Série C side Sampaio Corrêa, also in a temporary deal.

In August 2022 Duchatsch joined Ayutthaya United F.C.

== Career statistics ==
As of 2 November 2020

Club	Season	League			State League		Cup		Continental		Other		Total	
Club	Season	Division	Apps	Goals	Apps	Goals	Apps	Goals	Apps	Goals	Apps	Goals	Apps	Goals
Santos	2018	Série A	0	0	—		0	0	—		7 (Note: Appearance(s) in Copa Paulista)	0	7	0
Tupi (loan)	2019	Série D	0	0	5	0	1	0	—		—		6	0
Sampaio Corrêa (loan)	2019	Série C	0	0	—		—		—		—		0	0
Sampaio Corrêa	2020	Série C	0	0	1	0	0	0	—		—		1	0
Juventus-SP	2020	Paulista A2	—		5	0	—		—		—		5	0
Nacional de Muriaé	2020	Mineiro Módulo II	—		3	0	—		—		—		3	0
Career total			0	0	14	0	1	0	0	0	7	0	22	0
