= Rodrigo Pereira =

Rodrigo Pereira may refer to:

- Rodrigo Possebon (Rodrigo Pereira Possebon, born 1989), Brazilian footballer
- Rodrigo Pereira (Chilean footballer) (born 1982), Chilean footballer
- Rodrigo José Pereira (born 1988), Brazilian footballer
