= Adryan =

Brazilian footballer (born 1994)

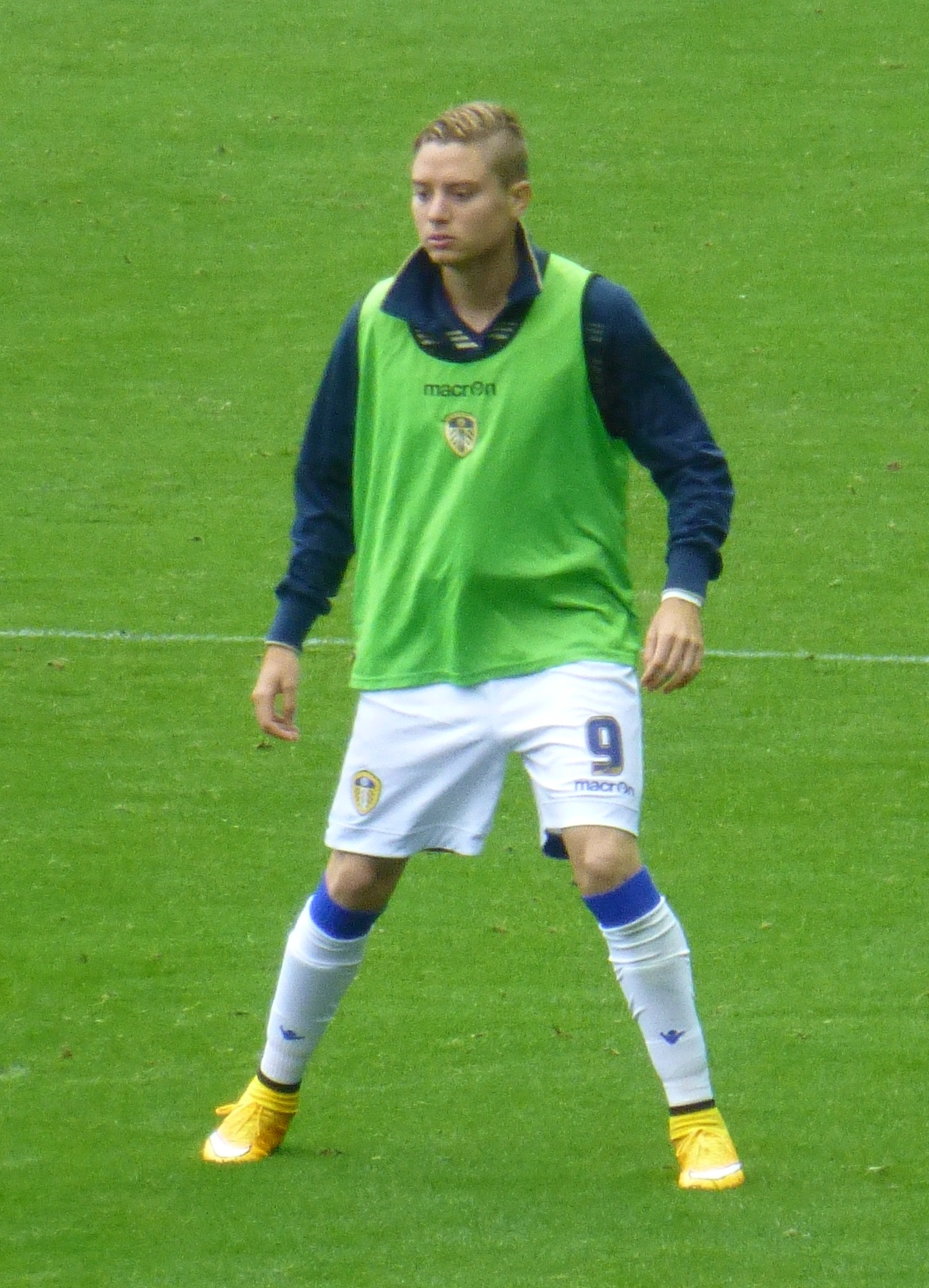
- Adryan warming up for Leeds United in 2014

Personal information
- Full name: Adryan Oliveira Tavares
- Date of birth: 10 August 1994 (age 32)
- Place of birth: Rio de Janeiro, Brazil
- Height: 1.75 m (5 ft 9 in)
- Position: Attacking midfielder

Youth career
- 2007–2012: Flamengo

Senior career*
Years	Team	Apps	(Gls)
2011–2017	Flamengo	40	(2)
2014	→ Cagliari (loan)	5	(0)
2014–2015	→ Leeds United (loan)	12	(0)
2015–2016	→ Nantes (loan)	20	(3)
2017–2023	Sion	46	(14)
2019	→ Kayserispor (loan)	3	(0)
2020–2021	→ Avaí (loan)	7	(0)
2023	Brescia	9	(1)
2024	ABC	2	(0)
2024	Portuguesa-RJ	6	(0)

International career
2009	Brazil U15		
2010	Brazil U16		
2011	Brazil U17	14	(8)
2013–2014	Brazil U20	3	(0)
- * Club domestic league appearances and goals as of 09:03, 23 July 2024 (UTC)

Adryan Oliveira Tavares (born 10 August 1994), or simply Adryan, is a Brazilian professional footballer who plays as an attacking midfielder.

Adryan began his career with Flamengo, with loan spells at Cagliari, Leeds United and Nantes. Other clubs he has played for include Sion, Kayserispor, Avai and Brescia.

He has also represented Brazil at various age groups up to under-20.

== Club career ==
=== Flamengo ===
Champion for Flamengo at youth level in 2010, the midfielder was selected, at that time aged 16, to play in the 2011 Copa São Paulo de Futebol Júnior (which allowed players under 18 years of age), was one of the top players in the tournament and finished as champion.

After the good campaign in the Copa São Paulo de Futebol Júnior coach Vanderlei Luxemburgo gave him a chance to train in the pre-season preparation with the professional team to fill the void left by Ronaldinho. He debuted in a friendly match against Londrina at Estádio do Café on 9 February 2011. He spent little time training with the professional team as he was selected to play with the Brazil U-17 team in the 2011 South American Under-17 Football Championship, being champion.

A few months later he was again selected to play in the Brazil U-17 team, but this at a higher level in the 2011 FIFA U-17 World Cup. During the competition he was linked with Manchester United. On 1 July 2012, Adryan played his first game for the Brazilian Série A, against Atlético Goianiense, and he scored in the 3–2 Flamengo victory. On 16 September 2012, he scored a freekick at the age of 16 for the Flamengo first team to help earn Flamengo a draw against Grêmio.

=== Cagliari ===
On 22 January 2014, it was announced that Adryan would go on loan to Cagliari Calcio for one and a half seasons. He played as Cagliari's no. 32. He made his debut for Cagliari on 1 February in Serie A against Fiorentina. Adryan played in the following four fixtures after making his debut, however he picked up a thigh injury against Inter Milan on 23 February and had to be replaced by Sebastian Eriksson, after recovering from injury he played against Udinese on 2 March 2014,

Under new owners and new management, Adryan was given the no. 10 shirt for the upcoming 2014–15 season.

=== Leeds United ===
On 30 August 2014, after speaking highly of Adryan, Leeds United president and former Cagliari owner Massimo Cellino negotiated a deal with his former club to terminate Adryan's loan deal, taking him to the Elland Road club on a season-long loan with the option of a permanent move, with an agreed transfer price of around £3 million. Adryan was given the number 9 shirt for the 2014–15 season.

Adryan made his Leeds debut as a substitute against Rotherham United in a 2–1 loss on 17 October. He made his first Leeds start in the following game, in a 1–1 draw against Norwich City, providing an assist for teammate Souleymane Doukara's equaliser. He followed this up against Blackpool with four key passes, two key dribbles and an assist.

On 29 November of the same year, Adryan had perhaps his most memorable act: a spectacular dive after he was tackled by Johnny Russell in the match between Leeds and Derby County, which Leeds won 2–0 at Elland Road.

=== Nantes ===
On 26 June 2015, it was announced that Adryan had joined French Ligue 1 side FC Nantes in a season-long loan move.

=== Sion ===
Adryan moved to Swiss club FC Sion in July 2017 having agreed a contract until 2020.

Following loans to Turkish club Kayserispor and Brazilian side Avaí, Adryan agreed a contract extension with Sion in August 2021. He signed until the end of the 2021–22 season with the option of a further year.

=== Brescia ===
On 2 February 2023, Adryan joined Brescia in the Italian Serie B.

== International career ==
Adryan was a key player for Brazil U-17 team in the 2011 South American Under-17 Football Championship victorious campaign. He played eight matches and scored three goals in the tournament and finished as champion.

The young player has been called up by coach Émerson Ávila alongside Lucas Piazón as the biggest stars of Brazil U-17 team in the 2011 FIFA U-17 World Cup. On 23 June 2011, Adryan scored the winning goal against Australia U-17 with a fine free-kick. On 26 June 2011, he scored the equaliser in the 90th minute to level Brazil U-17 with Ivory Coast U-17.

In 2012, Adryan was called up to the Brazil U-20 where he impressed, this time in the Mediterranean International Cup, where the Brazil team were eliminated in the semi-final, but Adryan was named Mediterranean International Cup Player of the tournament.

== Style of play ==
In 2012, he was included in the list of the 101 best players born after 1991 compiled by Don Balón.

In his homeland, Adryan is nicknamed herdeiro de Zico meaning 'heir of Zico' and il nuovo Zico (the new Zico).

Adryan's style of play has been compared to that of Brazilian compatriot Kaká, due to his skill and playmaker ability whilst playing in the 'number 10' role. Adryan can also play as a central midfielder and as a second striker. He is also renowned for being a free kick specialist.

== Career statistics ==
As of 31 August 2023

Appearances and goals by club, season and competition
Club	Season	League			Cup		Continental		Other		Total	
Club	Season	Division	Apps	Goals	Apps	Goals	Apps	Goals	Apps	Goals	Apps	Goals
Flamengo	2012	Série A	23	2	0	0	0	0	2 (Note: Appearances in Campeonato Carioca)	1	25	3
Flamengo	2013	Série A	14	0	4	0	–		4	0	22	0
Flamengo	2016	Série A	3	0	0	0	1	0	0	0	4	0
Flamengo	2017	Série A	0	0	0	0	0	0	4 (Note: Two appearances in Campeonato Carioca, two appearances in Primeira Liga (Brazil))	0	4	0
Flamengo	Total		40	2	4	0	1	0	10	1	55	3
Cagliari (loan)	2013–14	Serie A	5	0	0	0	–		–		5	0
Leeds United (loan)	2014–15	Championship	12	0	1	0	–		–		13	0
Nantes (loan)	2015–16	Ligue 1	20	3	4	4	–		–		24	7
Sion	2017–18	Swiss Super League	18	7	0	0	2	0	0	0	20	7
Sion	2018–19	Swiss Super League	20	7	1	0	0	0	0	0	21	7
Sion	2021–22	Swiss Super League	8	0	0	0	0	0	0	0	8	0
Sion	2022–23	Swiss Super League	0	0	0	0	0	0	0	0	0	0
Sion	Total		46	14	1	0	2	0	0	0	49	14
Kayserispor (loan)	2019–20	Süper Lig	3	0	1	0	–		–		4	0
Avaí (loan)	2020	Série B	0	0	0	0	–		2 (Note: Appearances in Campeonato Catarinense)	0	2	0
Avaí (loan)	2020	Série B	5	0	0	0	–		0	0	5	0
Avaí (loan)	Total		5	0	0	0	0	0	2	0	5	0
Brescia	2022–23	Serie B	9	1	0	0	–		–		9	1
Career total			140	20	11	4	3	0	12	1	166	25

== Honours ==
Flamengo

- Rio de Janeiro State League: 2011, 2017
- Copa do Brasil: 2013

Brazil U-17

- South American Under-17 Football Championship: 2011

Individual

- Fallon d'Floor: 2014
- FIFA U-17 World Cup Bronze Boot: 2011
