= Felipe Dias =

Brazilian footballer (born 1986)

Personal information
- Full name: Felipe Dias da Silva
- Date of birth: January 11, 1986 (age 40)
- Place of birth: São Paulo, Brazil
- Height: 1.80 m (5 ft 11 in)
- Position: Right back

Youth career
- 2001: Grêmio
- 2002: Cruzeiro
- 2003: Juventus-SP

Senior career*
Years	Team	Apps	(Gls)
2004–2006	Flamengo	6	(0)
2007	→ Náutico (loan)	1	(0)
2008	Marilia		
2009	Cabofriense		
2009–2010	Ferrovário		
- * Club domestic league appearances and goals

Felipe Dias da Silva or simply Felipe Dias (born January 11, 1986), is a Brazilian right back.

== Honours ==
- Brazilian Cup: 2006
