= Magal (footballer, born 1987) =

Brazilian footballer

Personal information
- Full name: Magno Aparecido de Andrade
- Date of birth: 28 June 1987 (age 39)
- Place of birth: Lavras, Brazil
- Height: 1.72 m (5 ft 7 1/2 in)
- Position: Left back

Senior career*
Years	Team	Apps	(Gls)
2007	Guarani-MG		
2007	→ Uberlândia (loan)		
2008–2009	Villa Nova		
2010	Democrata-GV	0	(0)
2010	ASA	28	(3)
2011	Americana	35	(1)
2012	Flamengo	14	(0)
2013	Bahia	0	(0)
2013	Portuguesa	0	(0)
2014	Ponte Preta	2	(0)
2014	Bragantino	4	(0)
2015–2016	São Bernardo	29	(1)
2016–2018	FC Juárez	65	(3)
2020	Tupynambás	0	(0)
2021	Democrata		
- * Club domestic league appearances and goals

Magno Aparecido de Andrade (born 28 June 1987), commonly known as Magal, is a Brazilian former footballer who played as a left back.

== Career ==
Magal plays both left back and right back. He began in Guarani-MG, followed by Uberlândia, Villa Nova (MG) and Democrata-GV, all of Minas Gerais, state where born. In 2010, he arrived to ASA of Alagoas, and, in the following year, he went to Americana, where he made 49 matches and one goal.

He arrived in Flamengo in the season of 2012. In an interview with Radio Brasil, a religious broadcaster, the first reinforcement of Flamengo to the season 2012, slipped in the vocabulary when asked about what changes in your life. Called attention of the technical commission red-black for the fact of be an athlete disciplined and have led only one yellow-card in the dispute of the Serie B. He made 35 games in championship. In his first press conference as a football player of Flamengo, the left back, he declared himself a fan of Thierry Henry, including revealed that the name of his son, Therry Daniel, was in honor of the French striker. Premiered in victory of 4 to 0 over the Bonsucesso, in match valid for the 2012 Campeonato Carioca.

=== Career statistics ===
(Correct as of October 10, 2012)

Club	Season	State League		Brazilian Série A		Copa do Brasil		Copa Libertadores		Copa Sudamericana		Total	
Club	Season	Apps	Goals	Apps	Goals	Apps	Goals	Apps	Goals	Apps	Goals	Apps	Goals
Flamengo
Flamengo	2012	6	0	14	0	0	0	1	0	-	-	21	0
Total		6	0	14	0	0	0	1	0	0	0	21	0

according to combined sources on the Flamengo official website and Flaestatística.
