= Edgardo Brittes =

Argentine footballer

Personal information
- Full name: Edgardo Miguel Brittes
- Date of birth: September 30, 1982 (age 44)
- Place of birth: Paraná, Entre Ríos, Argentina
- Height: 1.80 m (5 ft 11 in)
- Position: Forward

Youth career
- Patronato

Senior career*
| Years | Team | Apps | (Gls) |
| 2005–2010 | Patronato | 130 | (45) |
| 2010–2011 | Santamarina | 31 | (12) |
| 2011 | Libertad | 17 | (3) |
| 2012 | Real Potosí | 15 | (3) |
| 2012 | Patronato | 1 | (0) |
| 2013 | Santamarina | 19 | (5) |
| 2013–2015 | Patronato | | |
| 2015 | Almagro | 3 | (0) |
| 2015 | Central Norte | 24 | (11) |
| 2016 | Juventud Unida | 14 | (3) |
- * Club domestic league appearances and goals

Edgardo Brittes (born September 30, 1982, in Paraná (Entre Ríos), Argentina) is an Argentine former professional footballer who played as a forward.

== Career ==
Brittes (also known as Indio) began his football career with local side Patronato, helping the club win the 2008 Torneo Argentino B and the 2010 Torneo Argentino A. Brittes moved abroad to play in Bolivia for a brief spell in 2012.

He returned to Patronato in July 2012, where he would compete in the 2012–13 Primera B Nacional.

Brittes retired in 2017, last playing for Juventud Unida de Río Cuarto (in the Torneo Federal B).

== Teams ==
- Patronato 2005–2010
- Santamarina 2010–2011
- Libertad 2011
- Real Potosí 2012
- Patronato 2012
- Deportivo Santamarina 2012–2013
- Patronato 2013–2015
- Almagro 2015
- Central Norte 2015
- Juventud Unida 2016
