= Alberto Alarcón =

Argentine footballer

Personal information
- Date of birth: August 31, 1986 (age 40)
- Place of birth: San Fernando, Buenos Aires, Argentina
- Height: 1.85 m (6 ft 1 in)
- Position: Defender

Team information
- Current team: Ferro Carril Sud

Senior career*
Years	Team	Apps	(Gls)
2006–2007	Tigre	0	(0)
2007–2008	Defensores de Belgrano	23	(1)
2008–2010	Tigre	1	(0)
2010–2011	Colegiales	27	(0)
2011	Racing de Olavarría	4	(0)
2012	Real Potosí	10	(1)
2012–2013	Racing de Olavarría	22	(1)
2013–2014	UAI Urquiza	2	(0)
2014–2015	Club Atlético Alvarado	4	(0)
2015–2017	Ferro Carril Sud	16	(1)
- * Club domestic league appearances and goals

Alberto Alarcón (born August 31, 1986) is an Argentine footballer currently playing for Alvarado of the Torneo Federal A.

He was born in San Fernando, Buenos Aires.
