= Fabio Caballero =

Paraguayan footballer (born 1992)

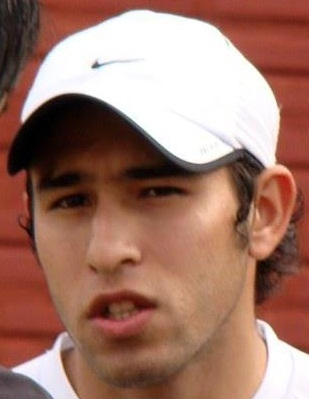

Personal information
- Full name: Fabio Caballero
- Date of birth: October 1, 1992 (age 34)
- Place of birth: Paraguay
- Position: Midfielder

Senior career*
Years	Team	Apps	(Gls)
2011–2014	Olimpia	38	(1)
2014	América Futebol Clube (MG)	0	(0)
2015	Rubio Ñu	10	(0)
2015	Tombense	0	(0)
2016–2017	River Plate	14	(2)
2017	3 de Febrero	0	(0)
Total		62	(3)

International career^{‡}
2012	Paraguay	1	(0)
- * Club domestic league appearances and goals as of January 24, 2019 ‡ National team caps and goals as of August 14, 2012

Fabio Caballero, better known as Caballero (born 1 October 1992), is a Paraguayan professional footballer who last played for 3 de Febrero.
