= Renato Santos (footballer, born 1987) =

Brazilian footballer

Personal information
- Full name: Renato dos Santos
- Date of birth: 30 January 1987 (age 39)
- Place of birth: São Bernardo do Campo, Brazil
- Height: 1.87 m (6 ft 2 in)
- Position: Central defender

Team information
- Current team: Itabaiana

Senior career*
Years	Team	Apps	(Gls)
2007–2008	Corinthians	0	(0)
2007	→ Juventus-SP (loan)	5	(1)
2008	→ Grêmio Barueri (loan)	2	(0)
2008–2009	Grêmio Barueri	0	(0)
2008–2009	→ Boavista (loan)	11	(1)
2009	→ Marília (loan)	5	(1)
2009	Penafiel	0	(0)
2010–2011	Joinville	21	(1)
2012	Avaí	17	(1)
2012–2015	Flamengo	14	(1)
2013	→ Vitória (loan)	3	(0)
2014	→ América-MG (loan)	11	(0)
2015	→ Bragantino (loan)	0	(0)
2015	→ Macaé (loan)	7	(0)
2016	Mogi Mirim	0	(0)
2017	Democrata	0	(0)
2019	Altos	0	(0)
2019–	Itabaiana	7	(0)
- * Club domestic league appearances and goals as of 22:25, 25 June 2019 (UTC)

Renato dos Santos (born 30 January 1987) is a Brazilian footballer who plays for Itabaiana.

== Biography ==
In February 2007, he signed a 2-year contract with Corinthians Paulista. In June 2007 he was loaned to Juventus-SP for Campeonato Brasileiro Série C 2007, but the team exited in the first stage in August.

In December 2007 he was loaned to Grêmio Barueri for the whole 2008 year. He played the first 2 matches of Campeonato Brasileiro Série B 2008 but then dropped from the squad.

In August 2008 he was loaned to Boavista F.C. of Portuguese Liga de Honra, along with teammate Michel and Fuska. In May 2009, he was loaned to Marília for 2009 Campeonato Brasileiro Série C. After Marília exited the Série C ion the first stage, in August 2009, Penafiel of Liga de Honra signed him outright, but in January 2010 returned to Brazil for Joinville for 2010 Campeonato Catarinense and thus qualified 2010 Campeonato Brasileiro Série D as the best team in Santa Catarina which willing to play in national league.

On September 21, 2012, Santos, after shining in Série B, was, with his former Avaí partner Cléber Santana, presented at Flamengo. Without playing conditions, he must wait at least 15 days to debut for club.

=== Flamengo statistics ===
(Correct as of February 228, 2015)

Club	Season	State League		Brazilian Série A		Copa do Brasil		Copa Libertadores		Copa Sudamericana		Total	
Club	Season	Apps	Goals	Apps	Goals	Apps	Goals	Apps	Goals	Apps	Goals	Apps	Goals
Flamengo
Flamengo	2012	-	-	10	1	-	-	-	-	-	-	10	1
Flamengo	2013	4	0	4	0	0	0	-	-	-	-	8	0
Total		4	0	14	1	0	0	0	0	0	0	18	1

according to combined sources on the Flamengo official website and Flaestatística.

== Honours ==
- Copa Paulista de Futebol: 2007
- Campeonato Paulista do Interior: 2008
- Santa Catarina State League: 2012
