= Darío Bottinelli =

Argentine footballer (born 1986)

Personal information
- Full name: Darío Bottinelli
- Date of birth: December 26, 1986 (age 39)
- Place of birth: Buenos Aires, Argentina
- Height: 1.67 m (5 ft 6 in)
- Position: Attacking midfielder

Youth career
- San Lorenzo

Senior career*
Years	Team	Apps	(Gls)
2005–2007	San Lorenzo	32	(2)
2007	Racing Club	1	(0)
2008	Universidad Católica	14	(7)
2008–2010	Atlas	51	(11)
2010	→ Universidad Católica (loan)	16	(3)
2011–2012	Flamengo	47	(6)
2013	Coritiba	18	(0)
2014–2015	Universidad Católica	41	(9)
2015–2017	Toluca	31	(2)
2016–2017	→ Gimnasia y Esgrima (loan)	5	(0)
2017–2018	→ América de Cali (loan)	24	(3)
2018	Audax Italiano	11	(2)
2019	Unión de Santa Fe	0	(0)
2020	Almagro	3	(0)
- * Club domestic league appearances and goals as of 16 August 2020 (UTC)

Darío Bottinelli (born December 26, 1986) is an Argentine footballer who plays as an attacking midfielder. He is the younger brother of defender Jonathan Bottinelli.

== Career ==
=== San Lorenzo ===
Considered a good prospect for the future, Bottinelli managed to establish himself in the San Lorenzo first team during the 2006–07 season.

=== Racing ===
For the start of the 2007–08 season he was transferred to Racing.

=== Universidad Católica ===
In early 2008, Bottinelli was transferred to Universidad Católica to compete in the Chilean apertura and the Copa Libertadores.

=== Atlas ===
Atlas of Mexico's Primera Division, signed Darío for the Apertura 2008 season, beating powerhouse Club América in the bid for his rights.

=== Return to Universidad Católica ===
In the middle of 2010 Darío returned to Universidad Católica, this time on a one-year loan. But he only spent six months in Chile as Atlas negotiated his transfer to Flamengo.

=== Flamengo ===
On December 22, 2010, four days before his 24th birthday, Darío signed with Brazilian club Flamengo following the great success of Argentinian players in the Brazilian Série A such as Andrés D'Alessandro and Walter Montillo.

=== Coritiba ===
In early 2013, Darío signed with Coritiba after ending his contract with Flamengo

== Career statistics ==
(Correct as of July 30, 2014)

Club	Season	League		Cup		Continental		Other		Total	
Club	Season	Apps	Goals	Apps	Goals	Apps	Goals	Apps	Goals	Apps	Goals
San Lorenzo	2005-06	18	2	–		–		–		18	2
San Lorenzo	2006-07	14	0	–		–		–		14	0
San Lorenzo	Total	32	2	0	0	0	0	0	0	32	2
Racing	2007-08	1	0	-	-	-	-	-	-	1	0
Universidad Católica	2008	12	5	0	0	6	3	-	-	18	8
Atlas	2008-09	30	7	3	0	–		–		33	7
Atlas	2009-10	21	4	–		–		3	0	24	4
Atlas	Total	51	11	3	0	0	0	3	0	57	11
Universidad Católica (loan)	2010	16	3	1	0	–		–		17	3
Flamengo	2011	26	5	4	0	3	0	10	0	43	5
Flamengo	2012	21	1	0	0	8	2	13	0	42	3
Flamengo	Total	47	6	4	0	11	2	22	0	85	8
Coritiba	2013	18	0	0	0	2	0	0	0	20	0
Career total		177	27	8	0	17	5	25	0	232	32

according to combined sources on the Flamengo official website, Flaestatística, soccerway and espn.

== Honours ==
San Lorenzo

- Primera Division Argentina: Clausura 2007

Universidad Católica

- Primera División de Chile: 2010

Flamengo

- Campeonato Carioca: 2011
