= Leandro Cruz =

Brazilian footballer

Personal information
- Full name: Leandro Cruz de Oliveira
- Date of birth: 21 November 1982 (age 43)
- Place of birth: Rio de Janeiro, Brazil
- Height: 1.73 m (5 ft 8 in)
- Position: Midfielder

Team information
- Current team: Goytacaz

Youth career
- 1998–2001: CFZ

Senior career*
Years	Team	Apps	(Gls)
2002	Friburguense		
2004–2006	Democrata-SL		
2006	CFZ Brasília		
2007	Americana		
2007–2008	Corinthians		
2008	Juventude		
2009–2010	Boavista		
2009	→ Duque de Caxias (loan)		
2010	→ Vila Nova (loan)		
2010–2011	Navibank Saigon		
2012	Madureira		
2013–2014	Duque de Caxias		
2015	América de Três Rios		
2015–2016	Real Estelí		
2016	América de Três Rios		
2017–	Goytacaz		
- * Club domestic league appearances and goals

Leandro Cruz de Oliveira (born 21 November 1982) is a Brazilian footballer who currently plays as a midfielder for Goytacaz.

== Honours ==
Goytacaz

- Campeonato Carioca Série B1: 2017
