= Ramon Motta =

Brazilian footballer

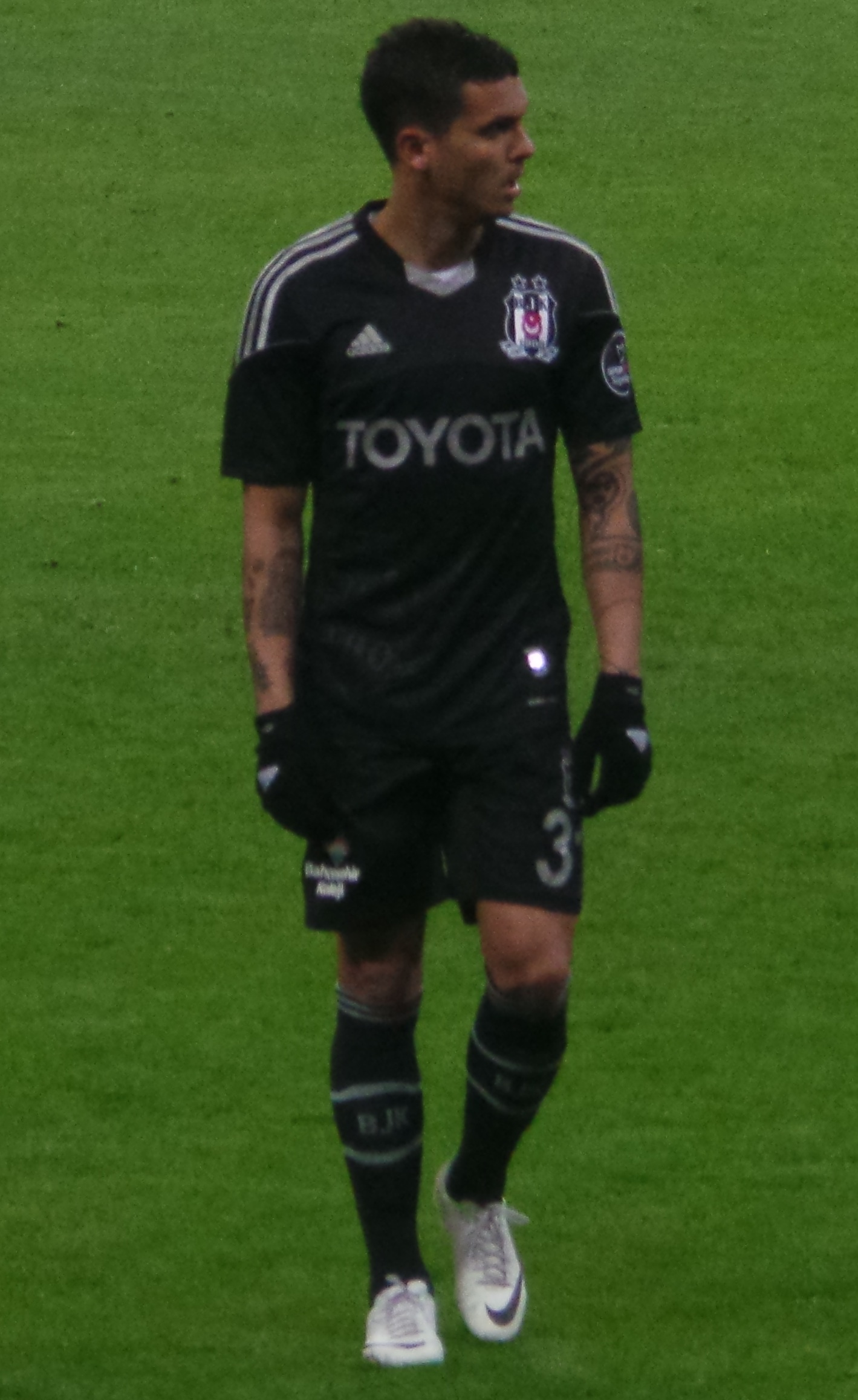

Personal information
- Full name: Ramon de Moraes Motta
- Date of birth: May 6, 1988 (age 38)
- Place of birth: Cachoeiro do Itapemirim, Brazil
- Height: 1.73 m (5 ft 8 in)
- Position: Left-back

Youth career
- 2002–2004: Real Salvador
- 2004–2006: Internacional

Senior career*
Years	Team	Apps	(Gls)
2007–2010	Internacional	28	(0)
2009	→ Vasco da Gama (loan)	55	(3)
2010–2011	Vasco da Gama	42	(5)
2011–2014	Corinthians	16	(1)
2012–2013	→ Flamengo (loan)	27	(1)
2013–2014	→ Beşiktaş (loan)	26	(1)
2014–2016	Beşiktaş	27	(2)
2016–2017	Antalyaspor	35	(3)
2017–2020	Vasco da Gama	36	(2)
- * Club domestic league appearances and goals

Ramon de Moraes Motta (born May 6, 1988) is a Brazilian former professional footballer who played as a left-back.

== Career statistics ==
Club performance
Club	Season	Brasileirão Série A		Brasileirão Série B		Copa do Brasil		Libertadores		Copa Sudamericana		State League		Friendly		Total
Club	Season	App	Goals	App	Goals	App	Goals	App	Goals	App	Goals	App	Goals	App	Goals	App	Goals
Internacional	2006	0	0	0	0	0	0	0	0	0	0	0	0	0	0	0	0
	2007	2	0	0	0	0	0	0	0	0	0	0	0	0	0	2	0
	2008	16	0	0	0	0	0	0	0	0	0	0	0	0	0	0	0
Vasco da Gama	2009	0	0	30	3	0	0	0	0	0	0	4	0	0	0	30	3
	2010	9	2	0	0	0	0	0	0	0	0	0	0	0	0	9	2
	2011	3	0	0	0	6	0	0	0	0	0	14	2	0	0	23	3
Corinthians	2011	10	1	0	0	0	0	0	0	0	0	0	0	0	0	15	2
	2012	6	0	0	0	0	0	0	0	0	0	6	1	2	0	14	1
Flamengo	2012	25	1	0	0	0	0	0	0	0	0	0	0	0	0	25	1
	2013	2	0	0	0	3	0	0	0	0	0	2	0	0	0	7	0
Total		73	4	30	3	9	0	2	0	0	0	26	3	2	0	141	12

== Honours ==
Vasco da Gama

- Campeonato Brasileiro Série B: 2009
- Copa do Brasil: 2011

Corinthians

- Campeonato Brasileiro Série A: 2011
- Copa Libertadores: 2012
