= Claudio Centurión =

Paraguayan footballer (born 1983)

Personal information
- Full name: Claudio Rubén Centurión
- Date of birth: 21 July 1983 (age 43)
- Place of birth: Concepción, Paraguay
- Height: 1.80 m (5 ft 11 in)
- Position: Defender

Senior career*
Years	Team	Apps	(Gls)
2006	Argentino de Quilmes	1	(0)
2006–2008	Sacachispas	4	(0)
2009	Nacional Potosí	10	(0)
2010	Guabirá	35	(2)
2011–2012	Real Potosí	36	(1)
2012–2013	Nacional Potosí	18	(1)
2013–2014	San José	14	(0)
2014–2015	Nacional Potosí	18	(1)
2015–2017	Real Potosí	72	(3)
2018	Sportivo Trinidense	4	(0)
Total		212	(9)
- * Club domestic league appearances and goals

Claudio Rubén Centurión (born 21 July 1983) is a Paraguayan former professional footballer who played as a defender, spending most of his career in Bolivia with clubs including Real Potosí, Nacional Potosí and San José.

== Teams ==
- (Argentina) Argentino de Quilmes 2006
- (Argentina) Sacachispas 2006–2008
- (Bolivia) Nacional Potosí 2009
- (Bolivia) Guabirá 2010
- (Bolivia) Real Potosí 2011–2012
- (Bolivia) Nacional Potosí 2012–2013
- (Bolivia) San José 2013–2014
- (Bolivia) Nacional Potosí 2014–2015
- (Bolivia) Real Potosí 2015–2017
- (Paraguay) Sportivo Trinidense 2018
