= João Felipe Antunes =

Brazilian footballer (born 1992)

Personal information
- Date of birth: 11 March 1992 (age 34)
- Place of birth: Porto Alegre, Brazil
- Height: 1.82 m (6 ft 0 in)
- Positions: Right back; right midfielder

Youth career
- 2003–2010: Internacional Porto Alegre
- 2010–2012: Flamengo

Senior career*
Years	Team	Apps	(Gls)
2012	Flamengo	3	(0)
2013–2014	Oțelul Galați	14	(0)
2015	Maringá	0	(0)
2015–2016	Flamengo Piaui	5	(0)
2016	→ Tiradentes CE (loan)	5	(0)
2017	Interporto	0	(0)
Total		27	(0)
- * Club domestic league appearances and goals as of 00:23, 15 February 2024

João Felipe Antunes (born 11 March 1992) is a Brazilian former footballer who played as a right defender. In 2013 he went with fellow Brazilian player, Marquinhos Carioca to play in Romania for Liga I club Oțelul Galați.
