= Rodrigo Fuska =

Brazilian footballer (born 1988)

Personal information
- Full name: Rodrigo José Pereira
- Date of birth: 11 January 1988 (age 38)
- Place of birth: São Paulo, Brazil
- Height: 1.81 m (5 ft 11 1/2 in)
- Position: Midfielder

Team information
- Current team: São José-PA

Senior career*
Years	Team	Apps	(Gls)
2007–2009	Grêmio Barueri	3	(0)
2008–2009	→ Boavista F.C. (loan)	6	(0)
2009	Botafogo	0	(0)
2010	SC Barueri	0	(0)
2011	Ceará	0	(0)
2012	Luverdense	5	(0)
2013–	São José-PA		
- * Club domestic league appearances and goals

Rodrigo José Pereira (born 11 January 1988), known as Rodrigo Fuska, is a Brazilian footballer who currently plays for São José.

== Biography ==
Fuska started his career at Grêmio Barueri, which he played 3 times in Campeonato Brasileiro Série B 2007. In August 2008 he was loaned to Boavista F.C. of Portuguese Liga de Honra, along with teammate Michel and Renato Santos.

In September 2009, he joined Botafogo-RJ of Campeonato Brasileiro Série A, but did not play.

In February 2010, he returned to Barueri, but for SC Barueri (ex-Campinas) as Grêmio Barueri was relocated to Presidente Prudente. He signed a contract until the end of Campeonato Paulista Série A3.

On 10 January 2011, he joined the Brazilian Série A side Ceará.
