= Wellington Silva (footballer, born 1988) =

Brazilian footballer

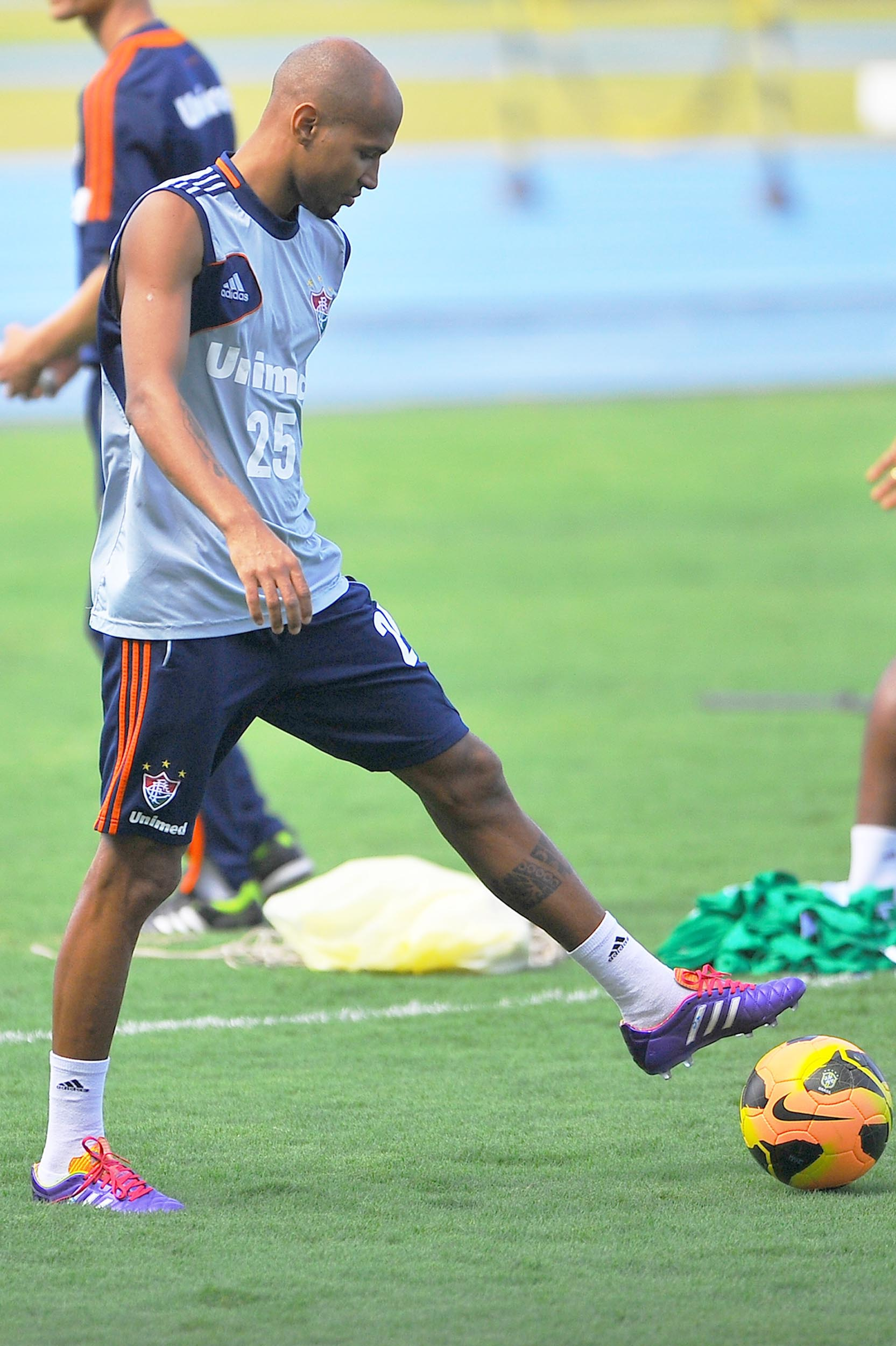
- Silva training with Fluminense in 2013

Personal information
- Full name: Wellington Nascimento Silva
- Date of birth: 6 March 1988 (age 38)
- Place of birth: Rio de Janeiro, Brazil
- Height: 1.77 m (5 ft 10 in)
- Position: Right back

Team information
- Current team: Volta Redonda
- Number: 2

Youth career
- 2007: Pão de Açúcar
- 2007–2008: Grêmio

Senior career*
Years	Team	Apps	(Gls)
2009	Grêmio	4	(0)
2010	Olaria	2	(0)
2011–2012	Resende	16	(1)
2011	→ Madureira (loan)	4	(0)
2012	→ Flamengo (loan)	19	(0)
2013–2017	Fluminense	68	(2)
2014	→ Internacional (loan)	14	(2)
2017	→ Bahia (loan)	3	(0)
2018	CSA	3	(0)
2019–2020	Boavista	25	(0)
2020	Juventude	6	(0)
2021	Remo	15	(0)
2022	Boavista	11	(0)
2022–	Volta Redonda	130	(1)
- * Club domestic league appearances and goals as of 11 November 2026

Wellington Nascimento Silva (born 6 March 1988), known as Wellington Silva, is a Brazilian footballer who plays as a right back for Volta Redonda.

After mild prominence in the Flamengo, the player notified and left the team, unilaterally.

== Career ==
=== Flamengo career statistics ===
(Correct as of December 9, 2012)

Club	Season	Carioca League		Brazilian Série A		Copa do Brasil		Copa Libertadores		Copa Sudamericana		Total	
Club	Season	Apps	Goals	Apps	Goals	Apps	Goals	Apps	Goals	Apps	Goals	Apps	Goals
Flamengo	2012	-	-	19	0	-	-	-	-	-	-	19	0
Total		0	0	19	0	0	0	0	0	0	0	19	0

according to combined sources on the Flamengo official website.

== Honours ==
Fluminense

- Primeira Liga: 2016

Bahia

- Copa do Nordeste: 2017

Remo

- Copa Verde: 2021
