= Arthur Sanches =

Brazilian footballer (born 1988)

Personal information
- Full name: José Arthur Sanches Filho
- Date of birth: March 28, 1988 (age 38)
- Place of birth: Aperibé, Rio de Janeiro, Brazil
- Height: 1.88 m (6 ft 2 in)
- Position: Center back

Team information
- Current team: Bangu

Senior career*
Years	Team	Apps	(Gls)
2000–2001	Palmeiras		
2001–2002	Portuguesa		
2002–2007	Avaí		
2004–2007	→ Al-Hilal (loan)		
2007–2008	Cruzeiro		
2007–2008	→ Al-Hilal (loan)		
2008–2010	Al-Rayyan		
2010–2012	Al-Shabab Riyadh	22	(1)
2012–2012	Lekhwiya		
2013–	Al-Sailiya		
- * Club domestic league appearances and goals

José Arthur Sanches Filho (born March 28, 1988), known as just Arthur Sanches, is a Brazilian football (soccer) defender who is playing for Al-Sailiya in Qatar.
